= Abstracting electricity =

British statutory ruling

Abstracting electricity is a statutory offence of dishonestly using, wasting, or diverting electricity, covered by different legislation in England and Wales, Northern Ireland and the Republic of Ireland. The law applies, for instance, in cases of bypassing an electricity meter, reconnecting a disconnected meter, plugging an electronic device into a socket without permission, or unlawfully obtaining a free telephone call.

In Low v Blease [1975] Crim LR 513, it was held that electricity could not be stolen as it is not property within the meaning of section 4 of the Theft Act 1968. Before the Computer Misuse Act 1990 those who misused computers ("hackers") were charged with abstracting electricity, as no other law applied.

== England and Wales ==
This offence is created by section 13 of the Theft Act 1968:

A person who dishonestly uses without due authority, or dishonestly causes to be wasted or diverted, any electricity shall on conviction on indictment be liable to imprisonment for a term not exceeding five years.

This section replaces section 10 of the Larceny Act 1916.

The following cases are relevant:

- Low v Blease – The Queen's Bench Divisional Court held that making telephone calls without payment did not constitute theft under the Theft Act 1968, because the electricity could not be described as "property" within the meaning of section 4 of that Act. Use of the electricity in this case did not amount to "appropriation".
- R v Hoar and Hoar
- Collins and Fox v Chief Constable of Merseyside
- R v McCreadie and Tume
- Boggeln v Williams

The applicable mens rea is dishonesty, as interpreted objectively following Ivey v Genting Casinos.

=== Visiting forces ===
This offence is an offence against property for the purposes of section 3 of the Visiting Forces Act 1952.

=== Mode of trial and sentence ===
This offence is triable either way. A person guilty of this offence is liable, on conviction on indictment, to imprisonment for a term not exceeding five years, or on summary conviction to imprisonment for a term not exceeding six months, or to a fine not exceeding the prescribed sum, or to both.

=== History ===
Section 10 of the Larceny Act 1916 provided:

Every person who maliciously or fraudulently abstracts, causes to be wasted or diverted, consumes or uses any electricity shall be guilty of felony, and on conviction thereof liable to be punished as in the case of simple larceny.

In one reported case in London in 2015, a man was arrested for abstracting electricity (to the value of £0.00052) by charging his mobile telephone on a London Overground train, but he was ultimately not charged. In 2018, London Overground introduced mobile charging sockets on its trains for public use.

=== Similar offences ===
Section 125 of the Communications Act 2003 contains a similar offence for "dishonestly obtaining electronic communications services" which applies to services such as telephony and internet access, while section 297 of the Copyright, Designs and Patents Act 1988 creates a summary offence of avoiding payment for a broadcast or cable television services.

== Northern Ireland ==
This offence is created by section 13 of the Theft Act (Northern Ireland) 1969, which is identical to section 13 of the Theft Act 1968. It replaces section 10 of the Larceny Act 1916.

Visiting forces

This offence is an offence against property for the purposes of section 3 of the Visiting Forces Act 1952.

=== Mode of trial ===
This offence is an indictable offence which may be tried summarily upon consent of the accused. See hybrid offence.

=== Sentence ===
A person guilty of this offence is liable, on conviction on indictment, to imprisonment for a term not exceeding five years, or on summary conviction to imprisonment for a term not exceeding twelve months, or to a fine not exceeding the prescribed sum, or to both.

== Republic of Ireland ==
This offence is created by section 15(2)(a) of the Energy (Miscellaneous Provisions) Act, 1995. That section replaces section 10 of the Larceny Act 1916, which was repealed by section 28 of, and the Schedule to, that Act.
