= Kempton Bunton =

English pensioner accused of art theft (1904–1976)

- Born: Kempton Cannon Bunton; 14 June 1904; Newcastle upon Tyne, England
- Died: April 1976 (aged 71); Newcastle upon Tyne, England
- Spouse: Dorothy Donnelly (m. 1925; died 1974)
- Children: 5
- Criminal charges: Offence contrary to Section 2 of the Larceny Act 1916 [unlawfully taking property of the Trustees of the National Gallery by stealing the frame of the portrait of the Duke of Wellington]
- Penalty: 3 mos. imprisonment

Details
- Imprisoned at: HM Prison Ford

Kempton Cannon Bunton (14 June 1904 – April 1976) was an English man who confessed to taking Francisco Goya's painting Portrait of the Duke of Wellington from the National Gallery in London in 1961. The story of Bunton and the painting was the subject of the October 2015 BBC Radio 4 drama Kempton and the Duke, and the 2020 film The Duke.

A National Archives file, released in 2012, revealed that Bunton's son John had confessed to the theft in 1969.

== The National Gallery burglary ==
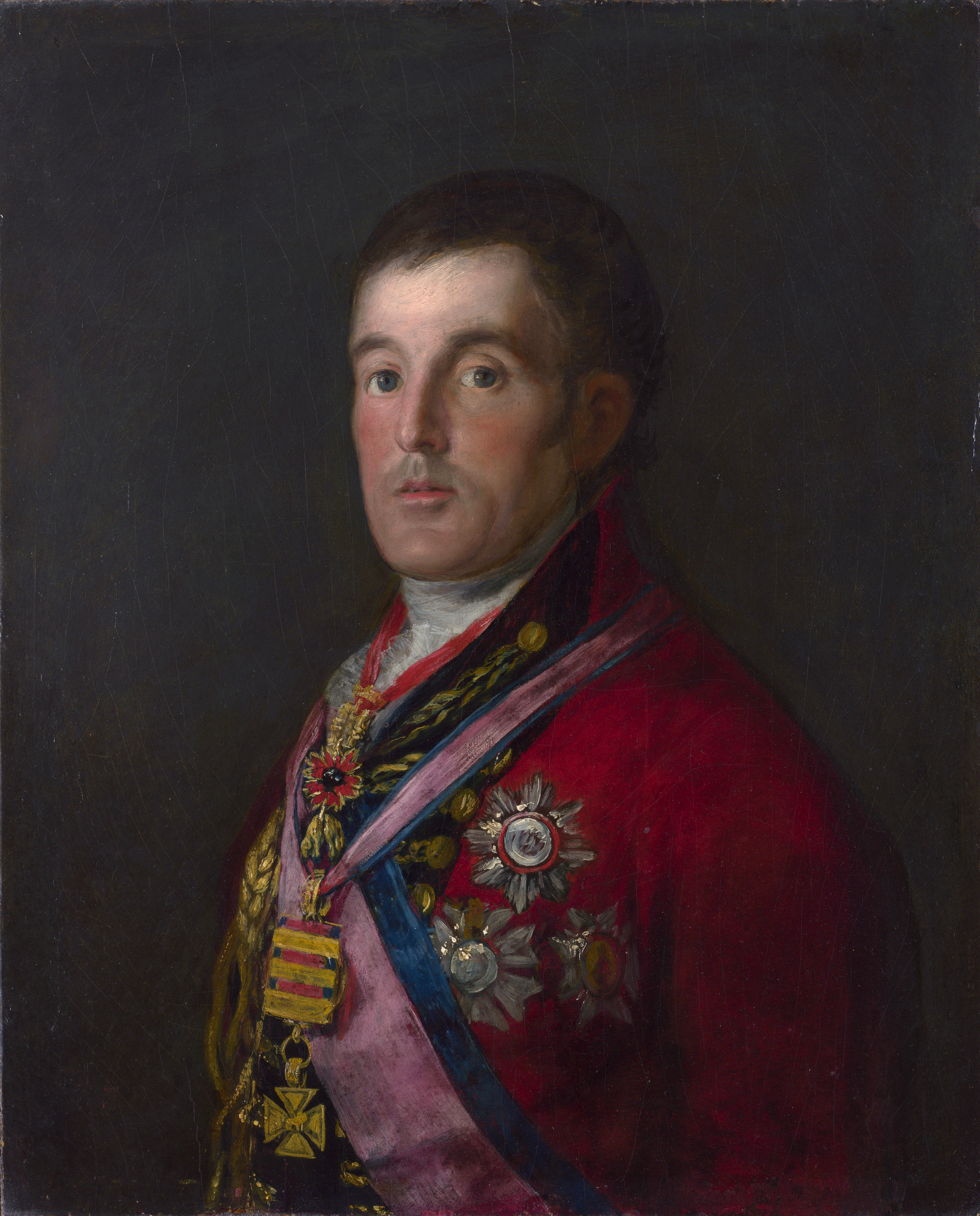
Portrait of the Duke of Wellington, by Goya (1812–1814), allegedly stolen by Bunton

=== Motive ===
Bunton was a disabled, retired bus driver who earned £8 a week in 1961 (equivalent to £155 in 2025). In that year, Charles Bierer Wrightsman, a rich American art collector, who made his money in the oil business, purchased Goya's painting Portrait of the Duke of Wellington from John Osborne, 11th Duke of Leeds for the sum of £140,000 ($390,000) (equivalent to £2,718,428 in 2025). He had plans to take it to the United States. The British Government decided to buy the painting, for the same sum, to prevent the painting leaving Britain. The move was reported to have enraged Bunton, however, who objected to the television licence fee, considering that television should be made available to everybody who needed it. He had campaigned for free television licences for pensioners and had been imprisoned several times for refusing to pay for a licence.

=== Theft ===
According to his own account, Bunton learnt from conversations with guards at the National Gallery that the elaborate electronic security system of infrared sensors and alarms was deactivated in the early morning to allow for cleaning. Bunton claimed that on the early morning of 21 August 1961 he had loosened a window in a toilet and entered the gallery. He further claimed that he had then prised the framed painting from the display and escaped via the window.

The police initially assumed that an expert art thief was responsible. A letter was received by the Reuters news agency, however, requesting a donation of £140,000 to charity to pay for television licences for poorer people, and demanding an amnesty for the thief, after which the painting would be returned. The request was declined.

=== Return and prosecution ===
In 1965, four years after the theft, Bunton contacted a newspaper and, through a left-luggage office at Birmingham New Street railway station, returned the painting voluntarily. Six weeks later, he also surrendered to the police, who initially discounted him as a suspect, considering it unlikely that a 61-year-old retiree, weighing 17 stone (240 lb; 110 kg), could have carried out the theft.

During the subsequent trial, the jury convicted Bunton only of the theft of the frame, which had not been returned. Bunton's defence team, led by Jeremy Hutchinson QC, successfully claimed that Bunton never wanted to keep the painting, which meant he could not be convicted of stealing it. Bunton was sentenced to and served three months in prison.

=== Subsequent confession, actions and legacy ===
In 1996, documents released by the National Gallery implied that another person may have carried out the theft, and then passed the painting to Bunton. Bunton's son John was mentioned. In 2012, following a Freedom of Information request by Richard Voyce, and with the assistance of Sarah Teather MP, the National Archives released a confidential file from the Director of Public Prosecutions in which it was revealed that Bunton's son, John, had confessed to the theft following his arrest in 1969 for an unrelated minor offence. John Bunton said that his father had intended to use the painting as part of his campaign and that it would ultimately have been returned to the National Gallery. He said that both he and his brother, Kenneth, had been ordered by their father not to come forward despite the trial. Sir Norman Skelhorn, the Director of Public Prosecutions, reviewed the case and concluded that prosecutions either against John Bunton or against his father would be unlikely to succeed and no further action was taken against either.

In a direct response to the case, Section 11 of the Theft Act 1968 was enacted, making it an offence to remove without authority any object displayed or kept for display to the public in a building to which the public have access.

Bunton's wife Dorothy Clasper Bunton (née Donnelly) died in 1974. Bunton himself died in Newcastle upon Tyne in April 1976, aged 71. His death went largely unreported and there were no obituaries in the major newspapers.

== In popular culture ==
Bunton's purported theft and the disappearance of the Goya work entered popular culture. In the 1962 James Bond film Dr. No, the painting is displayed in Dr. No's lair, with lead actor Sean Connery pausing before it. In The Goodies, episode 6 of series 2, "Culture for the Masses", refers to aspects of the case. In 2015, the comedy drama Kempton and the Duke by David Spicer was broadcast on BBC Radio 4.

The story of the theft and the subsequent trial of Bunton was dramatised in the film The Duke, starring Jim Broadbent and Helen Mirren, which premiered in UK cinemas on 25 February 2022. Coinciding with the release of the film, Christopher Bunton revealed previously unknown details about his grandfather's theft, including the family's side of the story.

== See also ==
- Vincenzo Peruggia (who stole the Mona Lisa)
