= Burglary in English law =

Criminal offence in English law

Burglary is a statutory offence in England and Wales.

In the three years to 2018 burglary reports in England and Wales rose by 6% while criminal charges for burglary fell by 33%. The number of police officers available to investigate burglary and other crimes also fell during that time.

== Statute ==
The offence of burglary is now defined by section 9 of the Theft Act 1968 which now reads:

- (1) A person is guilty of burglary if—
  - (a) he or she enters any building or part of a building as a trespasser and with intent to commit any such offence as is mentioned in subsection (2) below; or
  - (b) having entered any building or part of a building as a trespasser he steals or attempts to steal anything in the building or that part of it or inflicts or attempts to inflict on any person therein any grievous bodily harm.
- (2) The offences referred to in subsection (1)(a) above are offences of stealing anything in the building or part of a building in question, of inflicting on any person therein any grievous bodily harm ... therein, and of doing unlawful damage to the building or anything therein.
- (3) A person guilty of burglary shall on conviction on indictment be liable to imprisonment for a term not exceeding—
  - (a) where the offence was committed in respect of a building or part of a building which is a dwelling, fourteen years;
  - (b) in any other case, ten years.
- (4) References in subsections (1) and (2) above to a building, and the reference in subsection (3) above to a building which is a dwelling, shall apply also to an inhabited vehicle or vessel, and shall apply to any such vehicle or vessel at times when the person having a habitation in it is not there as well as at times when he is.

=== Burglary with intent to rape ===
Section 9(2) originally referred to the offence of raping any woman in the building or part of the building in question. The words "raping any person" were substituted for the words "raping any woman" on 3 November 1994. This was consequential on the changes to the definition of rape made by the Criminal Justice and Public Order Act 1994. The words "or raping any person" were in turn repealed on 1 May 2004. The offence of burglary with intent to rape was replaced by the offence of trespassing with intent to commit a sexual offence, contrary to section 63 of the Sexual Offences Act 2003.

=== Amendments to ss 9(3) and (4) ===
Sections 9(3) and (4) were substituted by the Criminal Justice Act 1991 on 1 October 1992.

== Elements of the offence ==
=== "Enters" ===
Although physical evidence of entry is not normally difficult to obtain, it can be difficult on occasions to decide whether an entry has occurred in law. In R v Collins [1973] QB 100, it was held that entry had to be "substantial" and "effective". The issue arose in R v Brown (1985) 71 Cr App R 15 in which the defendant had been found on the pavement outside a shop with the top half of his body through the broken window, sorting through property on display for sale; this was held by the Court of Appeal to constitute an effective entry, while regarding the use of the word "substantial" as unnecessarily wide. It was ruled that the jury had been entitled to conclude that the entry had been effective. Furthermore, in R v Ryan (1996) 160 JP 610, the defendant had been found partially within a building, having been trapped by a window, and argued that this was not a sufficient entry. However, he was convicted as it was held that a partial entry was sufficient and that it was irrelevant that he was due to circumstances incapable of stealing anything.

=== "Building or part of a building" ===
The Theft Act 1968 does not define a building, so this must be a matter of fact for the jury, however, Section 9(4) specifically states that the term includes an "inhabited vehicle or vessel"; hence motor homes, caravans and houseboats are protected by the section even when temporarily unoccupied. Burglary can also be committed in "part of a building" and in R v Walkington 1979 1 WLR 1169 the defendant had entered a large shop during trading hours but went behind a counter and put his hand in an empty till. The court held that he had entered that part of the building normally reserved for staff as a trespasser with intention to steal money and was therefore guilty of burglary.

=== "As a trespasser" ===
The essence of trespass is entering or remaining in another's property without authority; a person having permission to enter property for one purpose who in fact enters for another purpose may become a trespasser, and in R v Jones & Smith, a defendant who had a general permission to enter his father's home became a trespasser when he did so in order to steal a television set, because doing so was inconsistent with the general permission. In R v Collins [1973] QB 100 it was held that, since the trespass is part of a criminal act rather than a civil tort, it must be intentional or at least reckless; in particular, if permission to enter was predicated on the occupier's mistake, it was not burglary.

In recent years, the terms "distraction burglary", "artifice burglary" and "burglary by trick" have been used in crime prevention circles when access to premises is granted as a result of some deception on the occupier, usually by a pretence that the burglar represents somebody who might reasonably request access such as a water, gas or electricity supplier. There is no separate legal definition of this variant.

=== "With intent" ===
The intention to commit an offence (theft, grievous bodily harm or, for s9(1)(a), criminal damage), being an essential element of burglary, requires proof beyond reasonable doubt. For example, if entry is made to regain property which the defendant honestly believes he has a legal right to take, there is no intention to steal and the defendant is entitled to be acquitted. However, it has been held that a conditional intent to steal anything found to be of value is enough to satisfy this requirement.

=== Mens rea ===
R v Collins is authority for the proposition that the defendant must at least be reckless as to whether his entry is a trespass. For the section 9(1)(a) offence, proof beyond reasonable doubt is required that the defendant intended to commit the offence specified as part of the burglary. In the section 9(1)(b) offence, the mens rea is that of the offence committed, such that, for example, if grievous bodily harm is inflicted, recklessness will be sufficient to establish liability.

== Mode of trial and sentence ==
=== Mode of trial ===
Subject to the following exceptions, the offence of burglary is triable either way.

Burglary comprising the commission of, or an intention to commit, an offence which is triable only on indictment is triable only on indictment.

Burglary in a dwelling is triable only on indictment if any person in the dwelling was subjected to violence or the threat of violence.

If the charge would be the defendant's third qualifying domestic burglary under section 314(4) of the Sentencing Act 2020, the charge is triable only on indictment.

=== Sentence ===
==== Maximum ====
Section 9(3) of the Theft Act 1968, as substituted by section 26(2) of the Criminal Justice Act 1991, provides that:

A person guilty of burglary shall on conviction on indictment be liable to imprisonment for a term not exceeding –

- (a) where the offence was committed in respect of a building or part of a building which is a dwelling, fourteen years;
- (b) in any other case, ten years.

The reference in that section to a building which is a dwelling applies also to an inhabited vehicle or vessel, and applies to any such vehicle or vessel at times when the person having a habitation in it is not there as well as at times when he is.

A person guilty of burglary is liable on summary conviction to imprisonment for a term not exceeding six months, or to a fine not exceeding the prescribed sum, or to both.

==== Minimum ====
Section 314 of the Sentencing Act 2020 imposes a minimum sentence for a third domestic burglary. If a person over the age of 18 is convicted of a domestic burglary committed on or after 1 December 1999 and has two previous relevant convictions for domestic burglary, one of which was committed after conviction of the other, the court must impose a minimum sentence of 3 years' custodial sentence. Relevant domestic burglary convictions are defined by section 314(3) of the Act.

The ability of the court not to impose such a sentence differs slightly depending on when the offence was committed.

If the offence was committed before section 124 of the Police, Crime, Sentencing and Courts Act 2022 came into force (28 June 2022) the court must impose the minimum sentence unless there are particular circumstances which:

- (a) relate to any of the offences or to the offender, and
- (b) would make it unjust to do so in all the circumstances.

If the offence was committed on or after section 124 of the Police, Crime, Sentencing and Courts Act 2022 came into force (28 June 2022) the court must impose the minimum sentence unless there are exceptional circumstances which:

- (a) relate to any of the offences or to the offender, and
- (b) justify not doing so.

The "exceptional circumstances" of the latter conditions is held to be more stringent than "particular circumstances", having been found to mean more than "unusual".

The correct application of the minimum sentence is to first apply the sentencing guidelines as normal, and then adjust upwards if necessary.

==== Sentencing guidelines ====
The offence is one for which sentencing guidelines have been provided by the Sentencing Council. For domestic burglaries, the sentence ranges from a low level community order to a 6 year custodial sentence.

===== Authorities =====
Higher courts have consistently upheld lengthy custodial sentences for burglaries of dwellings; see, for example R v Brewster 1998 1 Cr App R (S) 181.

== Aggravated burglary ==
Under section 10, aggravated burglary is committed when a burglar enters and at the time has with him:

- a firearm, which includes an air gun;
- an imitation firearm, which means anything which has the appearance of being a firearm, whether capable of being discharged or not;
- a weapon of offence, meaning any article made or adapted for causing injury to or incapacitating a person, or intended by the person having it with him for such use; or
- any explosive, meaning any article manufactured for the purpose of producing a practical effect by explosion, or intended by the person having it with him for that purpose.

=== "Has with him" ===
In R v Kelt [1977] 65 Cr App R 74 it was held that this phrase will normally mean "carrying", and in R v Klass 162 JP 105, The Times, 17 December 1997 (CA) others had entered a building for criminal purposes while the defendant remained outside, but in possession of a scaffolding pole which had been used to break a window. This did not, in law, constitute an entry for the purposes of burglary. It was held that since Klass had not himself entered the building, he was guilty of burglary and not aggravated burglary.

=== "At the time" ===
- In R v O'Leary (1986) 82 Cr App R 337, the defendant entered a house unarmed but picked up a kitchen knife once inside; he then used it to force the occupier to hand over property. It was held that this constituted aggravated burglary because the offence which was part of the enterprise had been committed while in possession of the weapon.
- In R v Kelly, (1992) The Times, 2 December, the defendant had used a screwdriver to gain entry; once inside the premises, he was confronted by the occupiers and used the screwdriver as a weapon to force them to hand over a video recorder. It was held that the screwdriver became an offensive weapon when he formed an intention to use it for causing injury to the occupier at the time of the theft, and therefore he was guilty of aggravated burglary.

=== Mens rea ===
A plea that the defendant did not intend to use the weapon is not a defence to this charge (R v Stones [1989] 1 WLR).

=== Allocation and Sentence ===
Aggravated burglary is an indictable-only offence. It is punishable with imprisonment for life or for any shorter term.

== History ==
Sections 9 and 10 of the Theft Act 1968 replace sections 24 to 27 and 28(4) of the Larceny Act 1916. In the 1916 Act:

- Section 24 created the offence of sacrilege (defined the same way as burglary but relating to a "place of divine worship" rather than a dwelling and could be committed at any time).
- Section 25 created the offence of burglary (which could be committed only at night in respect of a dwelling-house).
- Section 26 created an offence described by its marginal note as "housebreaking and committing felony" (it could be committed in respect of certain types of building, but not only dwelling-houses).
- Section 27 created an offence described by its marginal note as "housebreaking with intent to commit felony".
- Section 28(4) created the offence of being found by night in any building with intent to commit any felony therein.

The offences all required either breaking and entering, or (except section 27) breaking out having committed the predicate felony. At the time of its repeal "felony" (a legal concept abolished in 1967) had been replaced with "arrestable offence".

Sections 51 and 52 of the Larceny Act 1861 related to burglary.
