= Removing article from place open to the public =

Law relating to theft in England, Wales, and Northern Ireland

Removing article from place open to the public is a statutory offence in England and Wales and Northern Ireland.

== England and Wales ==
This offence is created by section 11(1) of the Theft Act 1968. Sections 11(1) to (3) of that Act read:

(1) Subject to subsections (2) and (3) below, where the public have access to a building in order to view the building or part of it, or a collection or part of a collection housed in it, any person who without lawful authority removes from the building or its grounds the whole or part of any article displayed or kept for display to the public in the building or that part of it or in its grounds shall be guilty of an offence.

For this purpose "collection" includes a collection got together for a temporary purpose, but references in this section to a collection do not apply to a collection made or exhibited for the purpose of effecting sales or other commercial dealings.

(2) It is immaterial for purposes of subsection (1) above, that the public's access to a building is limited to a particular period or particular occasion; but where anything removed from a building or its grounds is there otherwise than as forming part of, or being on loan for exhibition with, a collection intended for permanent exhibition to the public, the person removing it does not thereby commit an offence under this section unless he removes it on a day when the public have access to the building as mentioned in subsection (1) above.

(3) A person does not commit an offence under this section if he believes that he has lawful authority for the removal of the thing in question or that he would have it if the person entitled to give it knew of the removal and the circumstances of it.

The following cases are relevant:

- R v Durkin [1973] 1 QB 786, 57 Cr App R 637, [1973] 2 All ER 872, [1973] Crim LR 372, CA
- R v Barr [1978] Crim LR 244

=== Section 11(3) ===
Edward Griew said that section 11(3) corresponds to sections 2(1)(a) and (b) (as to which, see dishonesty).

=== Visiting forces ===
This offence is an offence against property for the purposes of section 3 of the Visiting Forces Act 1952.

=== Mode of trial and sentence ===
This offence is triable either way. A person guilty of this offence is liable, on conviction on indictment, to imprisonment for a term not exceeding five years, or on summary conviction to imprisonment for a term not exceeding six months, or to a fine not exceeding the prescribed sum, or to both.

=== The "Goya clause" ===
The clause of the Theft Bill that became section 11 was popularly known as the "Goya clause". The name referred to the unauthorised removal of Goya's portrait of the Duke of Wellington from the National Gallery.

=== Criticism ===
Edward Griew said that the complexity of this offence is disproportionate to its importance.

== Northern Ireland ==
This offence is created by section 11(1) of the Theft Act (Northern Ireland) 1969. Section 11 of that Act is derived from section 11 of the Theft Act 1968.

=== Visiting forces ===
This offence is an offence against property for the purposes of section 3 of the Visiting Forces Act 1952.

=== Mode of trial ===
This offence is an indictable offence which may be tried summarily upon consent of the accused. See hybrid offence.

=== Sentence ===
A person guilty of this offence is liable, on conviction on indictment, to imprisonment for a term not exceeding five years, or on summary conviction to imprisonment for a term not exceeding twelve months, or to a fine not exceeding the prescribed sum, or to both.
