= R v Jones & Smith =

1976 case in English criminal law

- Court: Court of Appeal
- Decided: 9 March 1976
- Citation: [1976] 1 WLR 672, [1976] 3 All ER 54, (1976) 63 Cr App R 47, (1976) 120 SJ 299

Court membership
- Judges sitting: Lord Justice Lane, Lord Justice James, Mr Justice Cobb

Keywords
- burglary, trespass

R v Jones & Smith [1976] 1 WLR 672 (or R v Jones (John)) is a notable case in English criminal law. It clarified that for the purposes of burglary under the Theft Act 1968 s.9(1)(b), a person with general permission to enter a building may nonetheless be a trespasser when they act knowingly or recklessly in excess of that permission. Trespass is predominantly a feature of tort law and had not been an element of burglary under the previous Larceny Act 1916.

== Facts ==
On 10 May 1975, John Jones and Christopher Smith were arrested in the early hours of the morning, having drawn the attention of police by driving with a television set protruding from the back of their car. Around the same time, the father of Smith had reported two television sets missing from his home, fearing burglars may have gained access through a window that was already broken. Both television sets were found in the car driven by Smith.

The All England Law Reports recording of the case contains the most complete version of the judgment, including a substantial summary of the evidence at trial, omitted in the Weekly Law Reports account. This evidence made apparent that the two defendants not only contradicted each other at police interview, but subsequently contradicted themselves at trial. Of great significance to the appeal is that Smith's father was treated as a hostile witness by the Crown as he testified in favour of Smith's claim that he had taken the television sets for safekeeping. Additionally, Smith's father is quoted as saying:

Christopher would not be a trespasser in the house at any time.

Both Jones and Smith were convicted of burglary on 22 September 1975 and sentenced to 12 months imprisonment. They appealed on four grounds, including that the jury had been misdirected. The most significant of these was the first ground, the point of law that Smith's father had given him permission to come and go as he pleased, and a person that has general permission to enter the premises cannot be a trespasser.

== Judgment ==
Lord Justice James delivering the judgment noted the novelty of trespass in criminal law and that analogies in existing criminal cases were of little assistance. The leading case was taken to be R v Collins, four years earlier. This case made reference to the civil case of Hillen and Pettigrew v ICI (Alkali) Ltd, in particular the quote:

When you invite a person into your house to use the staircase you do not invite him to slide down the banisters.

Building on this, the judges expressed that:

[A] person is a trespasser for the purpose of s 9(1)(b) of the Theft Act 1968 if he enters premises of another knowing that he is in excess of the permission that has been given to him, providing facts are known to the accused which enable him to realise that he is acting in excess of the permission given or that he is acting recklessly as to whether he exceeds that permission, then that is sufficient for the jury to decide that he is in fact a trespasser.

The appeals were dismissed on the basis that a person with permission to enter may become a trespasser by knowingly or recklessly exceeding that permission, and that whether he did so is a matter of fact for the jury.

In concluding, the judges approved of the recorder's comments at trial that entering intending to steal is burglarious as no one gave permission to steal. Given the definition of stealing in the Theft Act includes dishonesty, it would be impossible to 'steal' with permission. This circular reasoning would make the words 'as a trespasser' in the Act redundant because a person with criminal intent in a building could never be anything but a trespasser, for example all shoplifting would become burglary rather than theft. The impact of this is mitigated by R v Walkington, as proof of this intent at the time of entry is still required.

== Significance ==
This case remains a leading authority on trespass in the law of burglary, even being considered by The Australian High Court. Despite it being a case most notable for importing a concept of tort into criminal law, it has since been cited in the judgment of tort law cases such as Jockey Club Racecourses Ltd v Persons Unknown.

The case was considered wrongly decided by some academics for being too wide a rule, arguing that burglary is a 'special offence' intended to address intruders in buildings and not the crimes of those lawfully permitted to be there.
