= Chelsea and Kilmainham Hospitals Act 1826 =

Act of the Parliament of the United Kingdom

Chelsea and Kilmainham Hospitals Act 1826 (Note: The citation of this act by this short title was authorised by section 1 of, and the first schedule to, the Short Titles Act 1896. Due to the repeal of those provisions it is now authorised by section 19(2) of the Interpretation Act 1978.)
- Act of Parliament
- Parliament of the United Kingdom
- Long title: An Act to consolidate and amend several Acts relating to the Royal Hospitals for Soldiers at Chelsea and Kilmainham.
- Citation: 7 Geo. 4. c. 16
- Territorial extent: United Kingdom

Dates
- Royal assent: 11 April 1826
- Commencement: 11 April 1826 (Note: The Acts of Parliament (Commencement) Act 1793.)
Other legislation
Amends	See § Repealed enactments
Repeals/revokes	See § Repealed enactments
Amended by	Army Pensions Act 1830; Post Office (Repeal of Laws) Act 1837; Chelsea Hospital Out-pensioners Act 1842; Out-pensioners Payment Act 1846; Statute Law Revision Act 1873; Statute Law Revision (No. 2) Act 1888; Statute Law Revision Act 1890; Statute Law Revision Act 1893; Perjury Act 1911; Forgery Act 1913; Indictments Act 1915; Statute Law Revision Act 1948; Mental Health Act 1959; Charities Act 1960; Administration of Justice Act 1965; Theft Act 1968; Theft Act (Northern Ireland) 1969; Finance Act 1970; Finance Act (Northern Ireland) 1970; Statute Law (Repeals) Act 1976; Statute Law (Repeals) Act 1977; Perjury (Northern Ireland) Order 1979; Statute Law Revision (Northern Ireland) Act 1980; Administration of Justice Act 1982; Mental Health Act 1983; Constitutional Reform Act 2005; Statute Law (Repeals) Act 2008

Status: Amended

Text of statute as originally enacted

Revised text of statute as amended

Text of the Chelsea and Kilmainham Hospitals Act 1826 as in force today (including any amendments) within the United Kingdom, from legislation.gov.uk.

The Chelsea and Kilmainham Hospitals Act 1826 (7 Geo. 4. c. 16) is an act of the Parliament of the United Kingdom that consolidated enactments related to the Royal Hospital Chelsea and the Royal Hospital Kilmainham.

As of 2025, the act remains in force in the United Kingdom.

== Provisions ==
Section 1 of the act repealed nine enactments, listed in that section.

Citation	Short title	Description	Extent of repeal
46 Geo. 3 . c. 69	Pensions to Soldiers Act 1806	An Act passed in the Forty-sixth Year of the Reign of His late Majesty, intituled An Act for making better Provision for Soldiers.	The whole act.
47 Geo. 3 Sess. 2. c. 5	Kilmainham Hospital Pensions Act 1807	An Act passed in the Forty-seventh Year of the Reign of His said late Majesty, intituled An Act for empowering the Commissioners of Kilmainham Hospital to make Rules and Regulations for the Payment of Pensions to Soldiers on the Establishment of that Hospital.	The whole act.
52 Geo. 3. c. 109	Chelsea Hospital Act 1812	An Act passed in the Fifty-second Year of the Reign of His said late Majesty, intituled An Act to empower the Commissioners of Chelsea Hospital to commute Pensions for a Sum of Money in certain Cases.	The whole act.
58 Geo. 3. c. 74	Chelsea etc., Hospitals Act 1818	An Act passed in the Fifty-eighth Year of the Reign of His said late Majesty, intituled An Act for the further Regulation of Payments of Pensions to Soldiers upon the Establishments of Chelsea and Kilmainham.	The whole act.
3 Geo. 4. c. 57	Kilmainham and Chelsea Hospitals Act 1822	Act passed in the Third Year of the Reign of His present Majesty, intituled An Act for transferring such of the Duties of the Commissioners or Governors of Kilmainham Hospital, as relate to the Management and Payment of out-pensions, to the Commissioners of Chelsea Hospital.	The whole act.
28 Geo. 2. c. 1	Chelsea Hospital Act 1755	An Act passed in the Twenty-eighth "Year of the Reign of His Majesty King George the Second, intituled An Act for the Relief of the Out-pensioners of the Royal Hospital at Chelsea.	Except so much thereof as enacts, that the Treasurer of Chelsea Hospital shall and may withhold and deduct One Shilling in the Pound from and out of all Monies which shall, from and after the Twenty-fifth Day of December One thousand seven hundred and fifty-five, be applicable to the Payment of Out-pensions, as well as from and out of all Monies which shall be directed to be issued in advance to the Out-pensioners of Chelsea Hospital, from and after the said Twenty-fifth Day of December One thousand seven hundred and fifty-four, which Monies so deducted shall be applied in the Manner which His Majesty, His Heirs and Successors, shall, by Warrant under His Royal Sign Manual, direct.
55 Geo. 3. c. 133	Chelsea and Greenwich Hospitals Act 1815	An Act passed in the Fifty-fifth Year of the Reign of His said late Majesty, intituled An Act to grant further Powers to the Commissioners of Chelsea and Greenwich Hospitals, with respect to Pensions on those Establishments.	Except so much thereof as enacts, that it shall and may be lawful for the Commissioners and Governors of the Royal Hospital for Seamen at Greenwich, upon all Applications to be hereafter made to them by any Person or Persons claiming Pensions on account of their Services in His Majesty's Navy, to apportion the Pensions which shall be granted to such Person or Persons in their Discretion, according to their Length of Service, allowing in the Apportionment of such Pensions all such Time as the said Person or Persons shall have served previously to his entering into the Navy or Marines, either as a Non-commissioned Officer or Private Marine, or as a Non-commissioned Officer or Private Soldier in any of His Majesty's Land Forces.
57 Geo. 3. c. 77	Army Prize Money, etc. Act 1817	An Act, passed in the Fifty-seventh Year of the Reign of His said late Majesty, intituled An Act for extending the Provisions of an Act of the Fifty-fourth Year of His present Majesty, for regulating the Payment of Army Prize Money, and for authorizing the Commissioners of Chelsea Hospital to suspend the Pensions of such Persons as shall be guilty of Frauds in respect of Prize Money or Pensions.	As enacts, that it shall and may be lawful for the Commissioners of the said Royal Hospital at Chelsea, upon Complaint and Proof being made to them of any Fraud, either with respect to the Receipt of Prize Money or Pension, or any other Money in the Nature of Allowance or Bounty Money, or of other gross Misconduct attempted or practised by any Person being a Pensioner of the said Royal Hospital, to suspend or entirely to take away the Pension of the Person so offending, and "to" issue to the Paymaster of Out-pensions of the said Royal Hospital a Certificate under the Hands of the said Commissioners, or any Three or more of them, of any Pension being so suspended or taken away; and upon the said Certificate being issued to the said Paymaster of Pensions, that he shall suspend the Payment of the Pension therein mentioned, according to the Tenor of the said Certificate ; any thing in any other Act contained to the contrary thereof in anywise notwithstanding.
5 Geo. 4. c. 107	Chelsea Hospital Act 1824	An Act passed in the Fifth Year of the Reign of His present Majesty, intituled An Act to prevent the illegal pawning of Clothes and Stores belonging to Chelsea Hospital; to give further Powers to the Treasurer and Deputy Treasurer of Chelsea and Greenwich Hospitals to punish Persons fraudulently receiving Prize Money or Pensions; and to enable the Commissioners of Chelsea Hospital to hold Land purchased under the Will of Colonel Drouly.	As enacts, that the Commissioners of the said Royal Hospital, and their Successors, shall and may cause the Clothes, Linen, Stores, and other Articles belonging to the said Hospital, capable of being marked, to be from Time to Time marked, stamped, or branded with the Words "Chelsea " Hospital ;" and that if any Pensioner, or other Person or Persons, shall pawn, sell, or illegally dispose of, or that if any Pawnbroker or other Person or Persons shall take in pawn, buy, exchange, or receive any Clothes, Linen, or other Goods, marked, stamped, or branded as aforesaid, upon any Account or Pretence whatever, such Mark, Stamp, or Brand thereon to be considered and taken as sufficient, without further Proof, that the Articles so marked, stamped, or branded are the Property of the said Commissioners ; or that if any Pensioner, or other Person or Persons, shall cause such Mark or Stamp, Marks or Stamps, to be taken out, obliterated, or defaced, from any of the Articles belonging to the said Royal Hospital, the Person or Persons so offending shall forfeit for every such Offence the Sum of Ten Pounds, upon Conviction thereof by the Oath of One or more credible Witness or Witnesses, before any One or more of His Majesty's Justices of the Peace of the County wherein the said Offence or Offences shall be committed; and that such Penalty shall be levied by Warrant under the Hand and Seal or Hands and Seals of the said Justice or Justices of the Peace, by Distress and Sale of the Goods and Chattels of the said Offender or Offenders; and that One Moiety of the said Penalty or Penalties shall be paid to the Informer or Informers, and the other Moiety shall go and be paid to the Use of the said Hospital; and that in case any Offender, who shall be convicted of having pawned, sold, or illegally disposed of, or bought, exchanged, received, or taken in pawn, any such Clothes, Linen, or other Goods as aforesaid, or of having caused such Mark or Stamp, Marks or Stamps as aforesaid, to be taken out or defaced, shall not have (or shall at the Time of Conviction declare that he or she has not) sufficient Goods and Chattels whereon Distress may be made to the Value of the said Penalty or Penalties recovered against him or her for such Offence or Offences, or that in case it shall be considered by the Justice or Justices before whom such Offender shall be convicted, that the Offender so convicted is likely to abscond before the said Penalty or Penalties can be levied by Distress, that then and in every such Case such Justice or Justices of the Peace shall and may, by Warrant under his or their Hand and Seal or Hands and Seals, commit the Offender to .the Common Gaol of the County where such Offence or Offences shall be committed, there to remain without Bail or Mainprize for the Space of Three Calendar Months, or until the said Penalty or Penalties shall be paid; and that all Actions or Suits to be brought or commenced by or on behalf of the Commissioners of the said Royal Hospital for Soldiers at Chelsea, shall be brought, commenced, and prosecuted in the Name of the Treasurer or Deputy Treasurer of the said Royal Hospital for the Time being; and that upon the Trial or Hearing of any such Action or Suit, it shall not be necessary to produce the Commission appointing the Commissioners of the said Royal Hospital, nor the Warrant or Authority appointing the said Treasurer or Deputy Treasurer to their respective Offices, but that the general acting of, the said Treasurer or Deputy Treasurer in their said respective Offices of Treasurer or Deputy Treasurer shall be deemed sufficient Proof of the due Appointment of them respectively to their said respective Offices; and that in all Indictments, Informations, arid other Proceedings against any Person or Persons, for feloniously stealing or taking away, or pawning or unlawfully disposing of, or buying, exchanging, receiving, or taking in pawn, any Goods or Property belonging to the said Royal Hospital, or the Commissioners of the same, it shall be sufficient to charge the same as being the Property of the Commissioners of the Royal Hospital for Soldiers at Chelsea.

== Subsequent developments ==
Sections 4, 6, 7, 8 and 9, in section 10, the words "or Kilmainham", section 12, in section 13, the words "or through the commissioners or governors of Kilmainham Hospital", section 22, in section 24, the words "or Kilmainham" and the words, wherever occurring, "of either of the said hospitals", "into either of the said hospitals", and "either of the said hospitals", section 26, in section 27, the words "either" and "or Kilmainham", and section 33 of the act were repealed by section 1(1) of, and part IV of schedule 1 to, the Statute Law (Repeals) Act 1976, which came into force on 27 May 1976.

Sections 42 and 43 of, and the schedule to, the act were repealed by section 1(1) of, and part XVI of schedule 1 to, the Statute Law (Repeals) Act 1977, which came into force on 16 June 1977.
