= Commonwealth v. Mitchneck =

Criminal case in Pennsylvania, United States

- Court: Superior Court of Pennsylvania
- Decided: March 7, 1938
- Citations: 130 Pa. Super. 433; 198 A. 463

Case opinions
- Decision by: William H. Keller

Keywords
- Theft; Fraudulent conversion

Commonwealth v. Mitchneck, 130 Pa. Super. 433, 198 A. 463 (1938), is a criminal case involving the meaning of theft and ownership. Mitchneck operated a coal mine. Mitchneck's employees signed orders directing Mitchneck to deduct amounts from their wages to pay their bills at a store. Mitchneck did not pay their bills. Mitchneck was convicted of fraudulent conversion of the employee's money.

The Superior Court of Pennsylvania reversed the conviction and ordered acquittal. The court found that although Mitchneck owed money to the employees, any money held by Mitchneck (if it ever existed) did not yet belong to the employees, since it never entered into their hands in order to transfer ownership. The court held that criminal court cannot be used as a substitute for civil court to collect a debt.

The court wrote:

The defendant ... had not received, nor did he have in his possession, any money belonging to his employees. True, he owed them money, but that did not transfer to them the title and ownership of the money ... The money, if Mitchneck actually had it, of which there was no proof, was still his own, but, after he accepted the assignments, he owed the money to [the store] instead of to [the employees] ... Failure to pay the amount due to the new creditor was not fraudulent conversion ... Defendant's liability for the unpaid wages due to his employees was, and remained, civil, not criminal. His liability for the amount due [to the store] after his agreement ... was likewise civil and not criminal.
