= Criminal conversion =

Unauthorized criminal repossession of property

Criminal conversion is a crime, limited to parts of common law systems outside England and Wales, of exerting unauthorized use or control of someone else's property, at a minimum personal property, but in some jurisdictions also applying to types of real property, such as land (to squatting or holding over) or to patents, design rights and trademarks. It differs from theft in that it does not include the element of intending to deprive the owner of permanent possession of that property. As such, it is a lesser offense than the crime of theft. Criminal conversion specifies a type of conversion in that it involves criminal law, not civil law.

An example might be tapping someone's secured wireless LAN or public utility line (which could also amount to theft of services). Another example might be taking a joy ride in a car, never intending to keep it from the owner. Some have redefined such conduct as a specific type of theft, or another offence such as taking without owner's consent.

Note that the "unauthorized" use may begin after a period of authorized use, where, for example, a person rents a car then keeps it for an extra week without permission from the rental company. Another common example occurs when a person fails to report finding lost goods (including animals), intending only to keep them until someone asks for their return. When the intent becomes one of keeping the property, it is a theft.

== Fraudulent conversion ==
The two-pronged definition of fraudulent conversion is "conversion (Note: "The wrongful possession or disposition or another's property as if it were one's own; an act or series of acts of wilful interference, without lawful justification, with any chattel in a manner inconsistent with another's right, whereby that other person is deprived of the use and possession of that chattel.") that is committed by the use of fraud, either by obtaining the property, or in withholding it".

In England and Wales, the term fraudulent conversion was superseded by the identically named offences under the Larceny Act 1901 and sections 20 and 21 of the Larceny Act 1916.

The former offence of fraudulent conversion was replaced by an offence of theft, contrary to section 1(1) of the Theft Act 1968, from which it slightly differs.

== See also ==
- Conversion (law)
- Embezzlement
- Taking without owner's consent

== Notes and references ==
Notes
