= The Duke (2020 film) =

2020 British comedy-drama film

- Theatrical release poster with original release year
- Directed by: Roger Michell
- Written by: Richard Bean; Clive Coleman
- Produced by: Nicky Bentham
- Starring: Jim Broadbent; Helen Mirren; Fionn Whitehead; Charlotte Spencer
- Cinematography: Mike Eley
- Edited by: Kristina Hetherington
- Music by: George Fenton
- Production companies: Pathé; Ingenious Media; Neon Films; Screen Yorkshire
- Distributed by: Warner Bros. Entertainment UK
- Release dates: 4 September 2020 (Venice); 25 February 2022 (United Kingdom)
- Running time: 96 minutes
- Country: United Kingdom
- Language: English
- Box office: $14.2 million

The Duke is a 2020 British comedy drama film directed by Roger Michell, with a screenplay by Richard Bean and Clive Coleman. It is based on the true story of the 1961 theft of the Portrait of the Duke of Wellington by Kempton Bunton. The film stars Jim Broadbent, Helen Mirren, Fionn Whitehead, Anna Maxwell Martin, and Matthew Goode. It was Michell's penultimate film before his death on 22 September 2021.

The film was released in cinemas in the UK on 25 February 2022 to generally good reviews.

== Plot ==
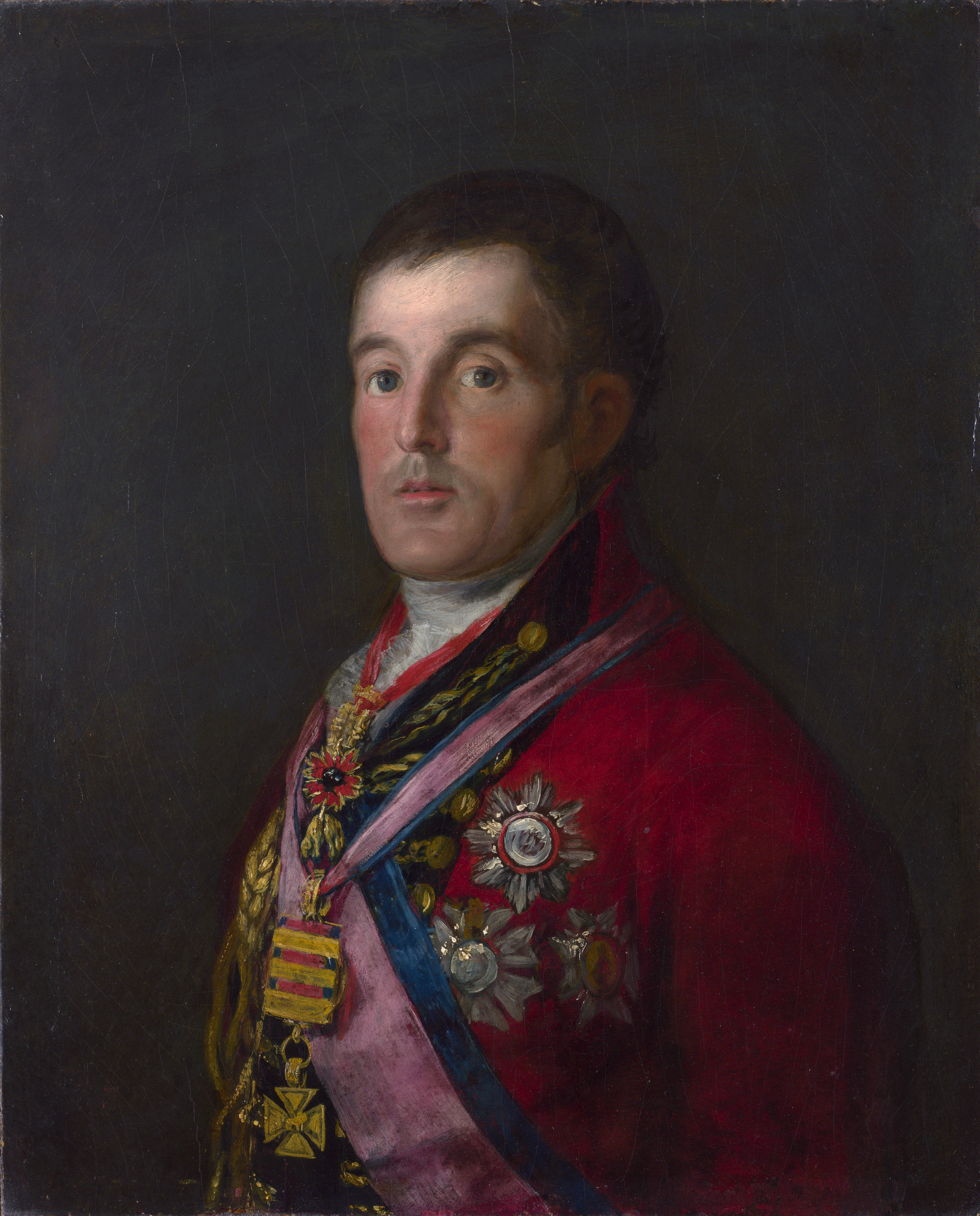
Portrait of the Duke of Wellington by Francisco de Goya

Sixty-year-old self-educated working-class Kempton Bunton appears in Court Number 1 at the Old Bailey, pleading not guilty to charges of stealing Goya's Portrait of the Duke of Wellington and its frame from the National Gallery in London.

Six months earlier, in spring 1961, Kempton had sent a script to the BBC from his native Newcastle upon Tyne. Soon afterwards he is jailed at Durham for 13 days for watching TV without a licence. Although Kempton can afford one, he refuses to do so as he is campaigning against pensioners having to pay it, part of his wider strong beliefs about supporting the common man.

Kempton's son Jackie meets him on his release and on their way home they visit the grave of Marion, Jackie's sister, who had been killed at age 18 in a bicycle accident. Kempton's wife Dorothy works as a housekeeper and babysitter for a local councillor and his wife; Jackie aims to become a boatbuilder and move away; and his elder brother Kenny lives in Leeds, working in construction but involved in low-level crime.

Kempton himself is sacked from his job as a taxi driver due to being over-talkative to passengers and giving a free ride to an impoverished disabled First World War veteran. He gets Dorothy to allow him a two-day trip to London to drum up press and parliamentary attention for his campaign and BBC interest in his scripts.

His wife lets him, on condition that if he does not get that attention he will give up writing and campaigning and get a job. An unseen man with a north-east English accent steals the painting, and after Kempton's return to Newcastle, he and Jackie make a false back to a wardrobe to hide it.

Kempton sends a series of ransom notes to the government, saying he will return the painting on condition the elderly be exempted from paying for a TV licence. Kenny and his married-but-separated lover Pammy come to visit his parents and she spots the painting in the wardrobe, revealing this to Kempton in hopes of getting half the £5,000 reward offered.

Panicked, Kempton abandons a suggested Daily Mirror plan to raise money for his campaign via an exhibition of the painting, He instead walks into the National Gallery to return it and confess to the theft. Though the case seems hopeless, his barrister Jeremy Hutchinson defends him on the grounds that he had no intent to deprive the Gallery of it permanently, but instead simply "borrowed" it to further his campaign, an impression Kempton bolsters by voluble testimony when questioned by Hutchinson.

Back in Newcastle during the early stages of the trial, Jackie reveals to his mother that it had in fact been he who stole the painting for his father to use in his campaign. So Kempton subsequently covered for him by taking the blame.

The jury acquits Kempton of all charges except the theft of the £80 picture frame, which Jackie had removed from the painting at his London lodgings and then lost. After his three-month sentence, Kempton and Dorothy forgive each other over how they had mishandled their grief at Marion's death. Their reconciliation is evident when they are sitting together in a cinema watching the 1962 James Bond film Dr. No, and chuckle when watching the scene that shows Sean Connery spotting the "stolen" Goya painting of the Duke of Wellington.

Four years later, Jackie admits his guilt to the police, but they and the Director of Public Prosecutions fear that a new trial could lead to Kempton being called as a witness and again becoming an embarrassing cause célèbre. They therefore agree that if Jackie does not go public, they will not prosecute.

Text at the end of the film states the frame was never recovered and that no plays by Bunton were ever produced, but that, in 2000, TV licences were made free to those over age 75. By August 2020, just before the film was first released, the policy of free TV licences for the over 75s had ended.

== Cast ==
- Jim Broadbent as Kempton Bunton
- Helen Mirren as Dorothy Bunton
- Fionn Whitehead as Jackie Bunton
- Matthew Goode as Jeremy Hutchinson
- Anna Maxwell Martin as Mrs Gowling
- Jack Bandeira as Kenny Bunton
- Aimée Kelly as Irene
- Joshua McGuire as Eric Crowther, Hutchinson's junior
- Charlotte Spencer as Pammy
- John Heffernan as Neddie Cussen, prosecuting barrister
- Andrew Havill as Sir Philip Hendy, Director of the National Gallery
- James Wilby as Carl Aarvold, judge in Kempton's case
- Heather Craney as Debbie, clerk of the court in Kempton's case
- Richard McCabe as Rab Butler, Home Secretary
- Charles Edwards as Sir Joseph Simpson, Commissioner of the Metropolitan Police
- Sian Clifford as Dr Unsworth, handwriting expert
- Austin Haynes as Scruffy Little Boy

== Production ==
It was announced in October 2019 that a film about the 1961 theft was in development, with Broadbent as Bunton and Mirren as his wife and Roger Michell set to direct. Fionn Whitehead was added the following month.

Filming began in November 2019, with Goode joining the cast. Location shooting took place in Bradford and Leeds, and the production team also used Prime Studios in Leeds.

== Release ==
The film had its world premiere at the Venice Film Festival on 4 September 2020. It was also selected to screen at the Telluride Film Festival in September 2020, prior to its cancellation due to the COVID-19 pandemic. Shortly after, Sony Pictures Classics acquired distribution rights to the film in the U.S., Latin America, Scandinavia, Eastern Europe (excluding Poland, the Czech Republic and former Yugoslavia), the CIS, Greece, Turkey, Portugal, South Africa, Southeast Asia (excluding Japan and China), and India. Pathé's distribution arm released the film in France and Switzerland.

The film was originally scheduled to be released in the United Kingdom by 20th Century Fox on 6 November 2020, but Pathé later delayed it to 2021 due to the COVID-19 pandemic. On 7 June 2021, it was announced that Pathé would release the film on 3 September 2021, after announcing a new distribution deal with Warner Bros. Pictures. On 23 July, Pathé announced that the film release would be again delayed, this time to 25 February 2022.

The Duke was released as a rental home premiere and is available on iTunes, Curzon, Amazon Prime Video, Sky Store, Google Play, and Microsoft Store.

It was then available on Blu-ray and DVD on June 13, 2022, by Pathé through Warner Bros. Home Entertainment.

== Reception ==
On the review aggregator website Rotten Tomatoes, 97% of 129 reviews are positive, with an average rating of 7.5/10. The website's critical consensus reads, "A sweet swan song for director Roger Michell, The Duke offers a well-acted and engaging dramatization of an entertainingly improbable true story." Metacritic, which uses a weighted average, assigned a score of 74 out of 100 based on 35 critics, indicating "generally favorable reviews".

The film was awarded 5 stars from The Guardian and The Daily Telegraph following its world premiere at the 77th Venice International Film Festival. It was released in cinemas in the UK on 25 February 2022.

== See also ==
- Vincenzo Peruggia (who stole the Mona Lisa in 1911)
- The Art of the Steal (2013 film)
