= Commonwealth of Pennsylvania v. Tluchak =

Commonwealth v. Tluchak, 166 Pa. Super. 16, 70 A.2d 657 (1950), was a case before the Superior Court of Pennsylvania involving the appeal of a larceny conviction.

In Tluchak the defendants had sold a farm to another couple. Between the time of sale and the time the purchasers moved in, the defendants took several items that were on the property. In that period, the defendant-sellers were not the legal owners of the property, but they were the legal possessors of it. The court held that the defendants could not be convicted of larceny because they never interfered with the purchasers' possessory interest.

== Background ==
=== Procedural posture ===
A jury convicted a husband and wife of larceny. The husband's sentence was restitution and a fine of $50; the wife's sentence was suspended. The couple appealed their convictions to the Superior Court of Pennsylvania.

=== Facts ===
The appellants agreed in writing to sell their farm to another couple. When the purchasers moved in they found several things missing that had been on the property at the time of purchase: a commode, washstand, hay carriage, electric stove cord, and 30-35 peach trees. The sale agreement did not cover personal property, but did cover: "All buildings, plumbing, heating, lighting fixtures, screens, storm sash, shades, blinds, awnings, shrubbery and plants." The purchasers also claimed there was an oral agreement that included the missing items not covered by the written sale agreement, though the appellants denied this. The Commonwealth charged larceny for all the missing items.

== Issue and holding ==
1. Are sellers who refuse or fail to deliver goods the goods they sold to another guilty of larceny?
2. No, larceny cannot occur until another person takes legal possession of a good.

== Analysis ==
Though the appellants argued that there was insufficient evidence to support a conviction because the contract did not cover the items listed in the indictment, the court assumed a sale had occurred.

=== Rule ===
Larceny is a crime of criminal trespass on the possessory rights of another. A person lawfully possessing another's property who converts the property to his own use, or otherwise deprives the owner of its use cannot be guilty of larceny because he lawfully received the property; the possessor, however, could be guilty of fraudulent conversion.

=== Application ===
Even if the appellants had sold the property when they sold the farm, they would still have been in legal possession of the property until the purchasers had taken lawful possession—i.e. moved into the farm. Therefore, they could not be guilty of larceny, because they legally possessed the property. While they might be guilty of fraudulent conversion or larceny by bailee, the prosecution did not charge those crimes.

== Disposition ==
The court reversed the judgments and sentences below and discharged the defendants.
