= Taking without owner's consent =

Unauthorised use of a motor vehicle

In England, Wales and Northern Ireland, taking without owner's consent (TWOC), also referred to as unauthorised taking of a motor vehicle (UTMV), describes any unauthorised use of a car or other conveyance that does not constitute theft. A similar offence, known as taking and driving away, exists in Scotland.

In police slang usage, twoc became a verb, with twocking and twockers (also spelled twoccing and twoccers) used respectively to describe car theft and those who perpetrate it: these usages subsequently filtered into general British slang.

== England and Wales ==
=== Discussion ===
Any unauthorised taking of a car is likely to cause distress and can cause significant inconvenience to the owner and his or her family, so this is an offence covering an everyday crime, yet one that often involves genuine emotions of personal invasion. Nevertheless, it is a summary offence defined under section 12(1) of the Theft Act 1968:

a person shall be guilty of an offence if, without having the consent of the owner or other lawful authority, he takes any conveyance for his own or another's use, or knowing that any conveyance has been taken without such authority, drives it or allows himself to be carried in or on it.

Adopting the standard section 1 definition of theft would require a dishonest appropriation of the conveyance with the intention of permanently depriving the owner. There will therefore be little difficulty in prosecuting as theft situations where the stolen car is later sold (sometimes through a process of 'ringing' i.e. its identity is changed and forged documents of title produced) or broken for spare parts, because the evidence of an intent permanently to deprive is clear. But the twoccing situation usually describes joyriding where all that is intended is an unauthorised use for a short period of time. Alternatively, it covers situations where a vehicle is taken for the purposes of another offence, e.g. it is to be used to escape after a bank robbery and then abandoned. This offence is an alternative verdict under section 12(4) which provides:

If on the trial of an indictment for theft the jury are not satisfied that the accused committed theft, but it is proved that the accused committed an offence under subsection (1), the jury may find him guilty of the offence under subsection (1).

=== Elements of the offence ===
==== Taking ====
There must be some positive movement of the vehicle. Simply rolling it forwards or backwards a few metres is not sufficient (if someone parks their car so close to yours that they make it impossible to drive your vehicle, it is permissible to move their vehicle a few feet to extricate yours) but, equally, it is not necessary that the engine be started. Releasing the brake and allowing the vehicle to run down a hill would be sufficient, as would driving the vehicle for a short distance. The taking may also be a material unauthorised use. For example, if a person hires a car to drive from London to Birmingham, but actually drives it to Liverpool, that will be a taking. The conveyance need not have anyone in it at the time of the taking; merely being a conveyance is sufficient.

==== A conveyance ====
To be a conveyance, the vehicle must have been constructed or adapted to carry a driver (and others, depending on the design) whether by land, water or air (so it includes hovercraft, boats and aircraft in addition to motorised land vehicles). Pedal cycles are excluded from section 12(1), but are covered by section 12(5) with reduced penalties, except for one constructed or adapted only for use under the control of a person not carried in or on it.

==== Without the consent of the owner ====
If the vehicle is taken with the owner's knowledge, the owner has consented. But apparent consent can be ignored if obtained by a deception, e.g. giving a false identity when hiring a car. This overlaps with the offence of fraud under the Fraud Act 2006. Taking by force may be robbery when the defendant did not intend the victim to recover the vehicle at all or so seriously damaged it that such conduct amounts to a theft (see section 6). If the evidence is insufficient for theft, the alternative charges are aggravated vehicle taking or blackmail under section 21. Note that section 12(7) protects the interests of people hiring or buying under a hire purchase agreement by deeming them to be the owner for the purposes of section 12.

==== Mens rea ====
The defendant must know that the vehicle has been taken without the owner's consent, and that the accused has either driven the vehicle or been a passenger.

==== Statutory defence ====
This is a statutory version of the so-called claim of right defence which represents an exception to the general rule that ignorantia juris non excusat, i.e. a limited mistake of law defence. Thus, section 12(6) allows a defence where the defendant believes that he has the lawful authority to do it or that he would have the owner's consent if the owner knew of his doing it and the circumstances of it. So, for example, if a vehicle was moved a short distance because it was causing an obstruction, those moving it might reasonably believe that they have lawful authority to remove the obstruction.

=== Attempt ===
Because section 12 is a summary only offence, there can be no attempt, so anticipatory acts are an offence of vehicle interference contrary to section 9 of the Criminal Attempts Act 1981. The defendant must interfere with the vehicle or a trailer or anything in or on it. Merely touching the vehicle would not be enough. There must be some positive effort made to enter or affect it, and an intention to take or steal it.

=== Aggravated vehicle taking ===
The offence of aggravated vehicle-taking was created by the Aggravated Vehicle-Taking Act 1992, which amended the Theft Act 1968 to address the issue of joyriding. AVT is an either-way offence. It is committed if a person commits an offence under section 12(1) of the Theft Act 1968 in relation to a mechanically propelled vehicle and it is proved that at any time after the vehicle was unlawfully taken (whether by that person or another) and before it was recovered, the vehicle was driven, or death, injury or damage was caused, in one or more the circumstances listed in section 12A(2):

- (a) that the vehicle was driven dangerously on a road or other public place;
- (b) that, owing to the driving of the vehicle, an accident occurred by which injury was caused to any person;
- (c) that, owing to the driving of the vehicle, an accident occurred by which damage was caused to any property, other than the vehicle;
- (d) that damage was caused to the vehicle.

There are two offences: under section 12A(2)(b) where an accident results in the death of another (maximum 14-year sentence), and the less serious version under the other three headings (maximum two years sentence). In R v Marcus Leon Ashley Forbes, the defendant was convicted of aggravated taking and driving while disqualified. He was seen to take a car and then engaged in a high-speed car chase with the police. The judge imposed the maximum consecutive sentences for these offences, reduced on appeal to 22 months' detention in a young offender institution as the defendant should have been given credit for a guilty plea.

== Northern Ireland ==
The offence of taking without consent exists in Northern Ireland under article 172 of the Road Traffic (Northern Ireland) Order 1981.

== Scotland ==
A similar offence known as taking and driving away exists in Scotland. It is an offence under section 178 of the Road Traffic Act 1988 to take and drive away a motor vehicle without the consent of the owner or, knowing the vehicle has been taken, to drive it or be carried in it.

The offence is intended to be used where a motor vehicle is taken, driven away and later abandoned. Where the vehicle is abandoned in a place where it is unlikely to be found the common law offence of theft is the more appropriate charge. Where police trace the vehicle and it is still in the possession of the person who took the vehicle is would also be more appropriate to charge the person with theft.

== See also ==
- Carjacking
- Motor vehicle theft
