= Emily Loizeau =

French author, composer, and singer (born 1975)

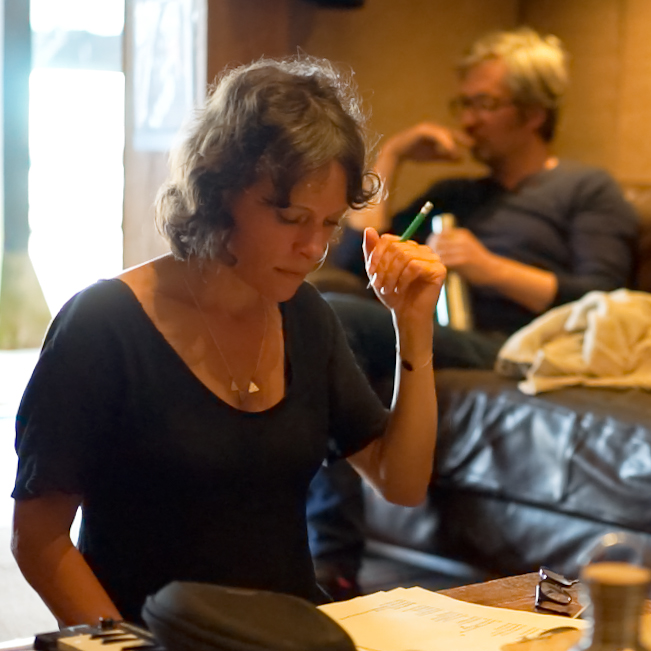
- Emily Loizeau in 2020

Background information
- Born: 7 February 1975 (age 51)
- Origin: Neuilly-sur-Seine, France
- Years active: 2001–present
- Website: (in French) Emily Loizeau

Emily Loizeau (born 7 February 1975) is a French author, composer, and singer. Her debut album, released in 2006, was titled L'autre bout du monde ("The Other Side of the World").

== Biography ==
Loizeau was born in Neuilly-sur-Seine, near Paris, France. Her father, Pierre Loizeau, was French, and her mother, Eliza Hutchinson, was British. Her maternal grandparents were actress Peggy Ashcroft and barrister Jeremy Hutchinson.

Around 1980, when she was five years old, Loizeau began to learn piano. After studying classical music for many years, she turned to studying philosophy and then theatre in London, then worked assisting composer and stage manager Georges Aperghis.

Loizeau cites Georges Brassens, Bob Dylan and The Beatles as her primary influences. Besides Bach and Franz Schubert, she also loves Renaud. She has also been influenced by Tom Waits, Nina Simone and Randy Newman.

At the end of 2001, at the age of 26, Loizeau began to perform at a small Parisian cabaret, which became for her a one-person cottage industry, printing flyers, doing publicity. She then began to collaborate with like-minded artists such as Vincent Segal, Franck Monnet, Nils Tavernier, Jean-Louis Foulquier. She signed with Fargo Records at the age of 31 (their first French artist) and released her first album L'autre bout du monde. She later performed at the Comedia, where she sold out for three weeks straight.

== Discography ==
- Folie en tête (mini-album, 2005)
- L'autre bout du monde (2006)
- Live au Grand Rex (2007)
- King Guillaume (2009)
- Pays sauvage (2009)
- Mothers & Tygers (2012)
- Revisited: Piano Cello Sessions (2014), with Olivier Koundouno on violincello
- Mona (2016)
- Origami (2017)
- Run Run Run (Hommage à Lou Reed) (2020)
- Icare (2021)
- La Souterraine (2024), produced by John Parish
