= Standard scale =

Scale maximum fines are set against in Commonwealth law

The standard scale is a system in Commonwealth law whereby financial criminal penalties (fines) in legislation have maximum levels set against a standard scale. Then, when inflation makes it necessary to increase the levels of the fines the legislators need to modify only the scale rather than every individual piece of legislation.

In English law, the reference in legislation will typically appear as:

... liable on summary conviction to imprisonment for a term not exceeding three months or a fine not exceeding level 4 on the standard scale, or both.

— Criminal Justice and Public Order Act 1994 (defining criminal trespass), section 61(4)

== Legislation and level of fines ==
=== Australia ===
In Australia, the monetary fines for a breach of law is determined by however many penalty units the offence is worth, times the value of that jurisdiction's penalty unit. All states and territories set their own penalty unit values, which is supplemented by the federal penalty unit for federal offences.

==== South Australia ====
Offences in South Australia use the following standard scale of fines:

South Australia standard scale
Division	Maximum fine
12	$75
11	$125
10	$250
9	$750
8	$1,250
7	$2,500
6	$5,000
5	$10,000
4	$20,000
3	$35,000
2	$50,000
1	$75,000

=== Channel Islands ===
==== Guernsey ====
Guernsey uses the UK standard scale for adopted UK legislation, and its own scale (called the uniform scale) for legislation originating in the States of Guernsey.

Guernsey's dependencies of Alderney and Sark have their own distinct scales, although these are generally in line with the Guernsey scale.

- The Uniform Scale of Fines (Bailiwick of Guernsey) Law 1989
- Criminal Justice Act 1982 (Guernsey) Order 1992

==== Alderney ====
- The Uniform Scale of Fines (Alderney) Law 1989 as amended by The Uniform Scale of Fines (Alderney) (Amendment) Ordinance 2007.

Alderney uniform scale of fines
Level on the scale	Maximum fine
1	£500
2	£1,000
3	£2,000
4	£5,000
5	£10,000

==== Sark ====
Sark has its own standard scale, which is normally maintained at the same levels as Guernsey's.

- The Uniform Scale of Fines (Sark) Law, 1989 as amended by the Uniform Scale of Fines (Sark) (Amendment) Ordinance, 1992, the Uniform Scale of Fines (Sark) (Amendment) Ordinance, 2004, and the Uniform Scale of Fines (Sark) (Amendment) Ordinance, 2006.

Sark uniform scale of fines
Level on the scale	Maximum fine
1	£500
2	£1,000
3	£2,000
4	£5,000
5	£10,000

=== Isle of Man ===
Since 1 January 2018, for Acts of Tynwald the Isle of Man uses a standard scale introduced by Section 55 of the Interpretation Act 2015. It replaced specified amounts specified within each piece of legislation.

Manx standard scale
Level on the scale	Maximum fine
1	£500
2	£1,000
3	£2,000
4	£5,000
5	£10,000

Above amounts as of 2019.

In respect of Acts of Parliament that extend to the Isle of Man the UK standard scale is used.

- Interpretation Act 2015 (An Act of Tynwald)
- Criminal Justice Act 1982 (An Act of Parliament) as extended to the Island by the Criminal Justice Act 1982 (Isle of Man) Order 1983, and amended by the Criminal Justice Act 1982 (Isle of Man) Order 1992.

=== Jersey ===
- Criminal Justice (Standard Scale of Fines) (Jersey) Law 1993
- Criminal Justice (Miscellaneous Provisions) (Jersey) Law 2016

Jersey standard scale
Level on the scale	Maximum fine
1	£200
2	£1,000
3	£10,000

Above amounts as of 2019.

==== Historic ====
Jersey standard scale 1993-2016
Level on the scale	Maximum fine
1	£50
2	£500
3	£2,000
4	£5,500

=== United Kingdom ===
Schedule 1 to the Interpretation Act 1978 defines "the standard scale" for each United Kingdom jurisdiction with reference to the following statutes.

The "statutory maximum", which is the maximum fine which can be imposed by a summary court for a triable either way statutory offence, is similarly defined by the Interpretation Act 1978 so as to correspond to the "prescribed sum" (in effect to the maximum (level 5) fine on the standard scale, except in Scotland).

==== England and Wales ====
Schedule 1 of the Interpretation Act 1978 defines "the standard scale", in relation to offences triable only summarily, to have the meaning given in:

- Section 122 of the Sentencing Code, defined by section 1 of the Sentencing Act 2020 to mean Parts 2 to 13 of that Act (the relevant section is in Part 7);
- for offences for which the defendant was convicted before 1 December 2020 (when the Sentencing Code entered into force): section 37 of the Criminal Justice Act 1982 (as amended by section 17(1) of the Criminal Justice Act 1991)

==== Scotland ====
The setting of the levels of the standard scale of fines in Scotland is a matter devolved to the Scottish Government.

- Criminal Procedure (Scotland) Act 1995, section 225

With effect from 10 December 2007, the Criminal Proceedings etc. Reform (Scotland) Act 2007 increased the "prescribed sum", and with it the "statutory maximum" from £5,000 to £10,000. The level of fines on the standard scale was unaltered.

==== Northern Ireland ====
- Fines and Penalties (Northern Ireland) Order 1984, article 5 (as amended by Criminal Justice (Northern Ireland) Order 1994, article 3(2))

==== Scale ====
UK standard scale
Scale level	Maximum fine
1	£200
2	£500
3	£1,000
4	£2,500
5	Unlimited

The above amounts apply with respect to offences committed on or after the following dates:

- in England and Wales and in Scotland, 1 October 1992
- in Northern Ireland, 9 January 1995

The United Kingdom standard scale was extended in respect of certain offences to two Crown dependencies:

- the Isle of Man, with effect from 1 December 1992 (by virtue of Criminal Justice Act 1982 (Isle of Man) Order 1992).
- Guernsey, with effect from 1 February 1993.

===== Historical limits =====
Before March 2015, the level 5 limit was £5,000. This limit was removed by section 85 of the Legal Aid, Sentencing and Punishment of Offenders Act 2012. The level 1–4 limits were unaffected.

Between 1984 and 1992, the standard scale in England and Wales was as follows:

Scale between 1984 and 1992
Level on the scale	Maximum fine
1	£50
2	£100
3	£400
4	£1,000
5	£2,000

=== Hong Kong ===
- Chapter 221 Criminal Procedure Ordinance, section 113B – Levels of fines for offences
- Chapter 221 Criminal Procedure Ordinance, schedule 8 – Level of fines for offences

Fines specified in prior legislation were converted to points on the standard scale by section 113C.

Hong Kong standard scale
Level on the scale	Maximum fine
1	HK$2,000
2	$5,000
3	$10,000
4	$25,000
5	$50,000
6	$100,000

Above amounts as of 2019.

=== Zimbabwe ===
- Criminal Penalties Amendment Act 2001, took effect from 20 May 2002

== See also ==
- Penalty unit
