= Larceny Act 1901 =

Act of the Parliament of the United Kingdom

Larceny Act 1901 (Note: Section 2(4).)
- Act of Parliament
- Parliament of the United Kingdom
- Long title: An Act to amend the Larceny Act, 1861.
- Citation: 1 Edw. 7. c. 10
- Territorial extent: United Kingdom

Dates
- Royal assent: 9 August 1901
- Commencement: 1 January 1902 (Note: Section 2(3).)
- Repealed: 1 January 1917
Other legislation
| Amends | Larceny Act 1861 |
| Repealed by | Larceny Act 1916 |

Status: Repealed

Text of statute as originally enacted

The Larceny Act 1901 (1 Edw. 7. c. 10) was an act of the Parliament of the United Kingdom. It created offences of fraudulent conversion.

This act amended sections 75 and 76 of the Larceny Act 1861 (24 & 25 Vict. c. 96). It made the offence of fraudulently misappropriating property entrusted to a person by another, or received by him on behalf of another a misdemeanour punishable by penal servitude for a term not exceeding seven years, or by imprisonment, with or without hard labour, for a term not exceeding two years.

== Section 1 ==
Form of indictment

The following specimen counts were formerly contained in paragraph 26 of the second schedule to the Indictments Act 1915 (5 & 6 Geo. 5. c. 90) before it was repealed.

STATEMENT OF OFFENCE.

First Count.

Fraudulent conversion of property, contrary to section 1(1)(a) of Larceny Act, 1901.

PARTICULARS OF OFFENCE.

A.B., on the day of , in the county of , fraudulently converted to his own use and benefit certain property, that is to say, 100 l. entrusted to him by H.S. in order that he, the said A.B., might retain the same in safe custody.

STATEMENT OF OFFENCE.

Second Count.

Fraudulent conversion of property, contrary to section 1(1)(b) of Larceny Act, 1901.

PARTICULARS OF OFFENCE.

A.B., on the day of , in the county of , fraudulently converted to his own use and benefit certain property, that is to say, the sum of 200 l. received by him for and on account of L.M.

== Subsequent developments ==
The whole act was repealed by section 48(1) of, and the schedule to, the Larceny Act 1916 (6 & 7 Geo. 5. c. 50), which came into force on 1 January 1917.

== See also ==
- Larceny Act
