= Larceny Act =

Stock short title used for legislation

Larceny Act (with its variations) is a stock short title which was formerly used for legislation in the United Kingdom and in the Republic of Ireland relating to larceny and other offences against property.

The Bill for an Act with this short title will have been known as a Larceny Bill during its passage through Parliament.

Larceny Acts may be a generic name either for legislation bearing that short title or for all legislation on that subject.

== United Kingdom ==
The Larceny Act 1827 (7 & 8 Geo. 4. c. 29)
The Larceny (Ireland) Act 1828 (9 Geo. 4. c. 55)
The Larceny Act 1861 (24 & 25 Vict. c. 96)
The Larceny Act 1868 (31 & 32 Vict. c. 116) (section 1 repealed by the Larceny Act 1916, s. 48(1) & Sch.)
The Larceny (Advertisements) Act 1870 (33 & 34 Vict. c. 65)
The Larceny Act 1896 (59 & 60 Vict. c. 52) (repealed by the Larceny Act 1916, s. 48(1) & Sch.)
The Larceny Act 1901 (1 Edw. 7. c. 10)
The Larceny Act 1916 (6 & 7 Geo. 5. c. 50)

=== The Larceny Acts ===
The Larceny Acts 1861 and 1870 means the Larceny Act 1861 and the Larceny (Advertisements) Act 1870.

== Republic of Ireland ==
The Larceny Act 1990 (No.9)

== See also ==
- Theft Act
- List of short titles
