= Theft Act =

Stock short title used for UK legislation

Theft Act (with its variations) is a stock short title used for legislation in the United Kingdom which relates to theft and other offences against property.

The Bill for an Act with this short title will have been known as a Theft Bill during its passage through Parliament.

Theft Acts may be a generic name either for legislation bearing that short title or for all legislation on that subject.

See also Larceny Act.

== List ==
=== United Kingdom ===
England and Wales

The Theft Act 1730 (4 Geo. 2. c. 32) (Repealed by the Statute Law Revision Act 1963)
The Theft Act 1968 (c. 60)
The Theft Act 1978 (c. 31)
The Theft (Amendment) Act 1996 (c. 62)

Scotland

The Theft Act 1607 (c. 6 (S))

Northern Ireland

The Theft Act (Northern Ireland) 1969 (c. 16 (N.I.))
The Theft (Northern Ireland) Order 1978 (SI 1978/1407)
The Theft (Amendment) (Northern Ireland) Order 1997 (SI 1997/277)

== See also ==
- List of short titles
