= Aggravated Vehicle-Taking Act 1992 =

Act of the Parliament of the United Kingdom

Aggravated Vehicle-Taking Act 1992 (Note: Section 4(1).)
- Act of Parliament
- Parliament of the United Kingdom
- Long title: An Act to make provision with respect to persons who commit offences under section 12(1) of the Theft Act 1968 in relation to a mechanically propelled vehicle where additional circumstances are present relating to the driving of or damage to the vehicle.
- Citation: 1992 c. 11
- Introduced by: Kenneth Baker
- Territorial extent: England and Wales (Note: Section 4(3).)

Dates
- Royal assent: 6 March 1992
- Commencement: 1 April 1992 (Note: Section 4(2). The Aggravated Vehicle-Taking Act 1992 (Commencement) Order 1992.)

Other legislation
- Amends: Theft Act 1968; Magistrates' Courts Act 1980; Road Traffic Offenders Act 1988
- Amended by: Sentencing Act 2020
- Relates to: Road Traffic Offenders Act 1988

Status: Amended

Text of statute as originally enacted

Text of the Aggravated Vehicle-Taking Act 1992 as in force today (including any amendments) within the United Kingdom, from legislation.gov.uk.

The Aggravated Vehicle-Taking Act 1992 (c. 11) is an act of the Parliament of the United Kingdom. It amends the Theft Act 1968 by creating the specific offence of aggravated vehicle-taking, which combines the taking of a vehicle without the owner's consent with driving it dangerously, causing injury, or causing damage to the vehicle or other property. It carries a mandatory disqualification from driving.

The act was brought in to tackle the problem of joyriding, which was at the time a widespread problem in the UK. It was subject to a fast-track passage through Parliament.
