= Offences within the Court Act 1541 =

Act of the Parliament of England

Offences within the Court Act 1541 (Note: The citation of this act by this short title was authorised by section 1 of, and the first schedule to, the Short Titles Act 1896. Due to the repeal of those provisions it is now authorised by section 19(2) of the Interpretation Act 1978.)
- Act of Parliament
- Parliament of England
- Long title: An Acte for Murther and malicious Bloudshed within the Courte. (Note: These words are printed against this act in the second column of the second schedule to the Statute Law Revision Act 1948, which is headed "Title".)
- Citation: 33 Hen. 8. c. 12
- Territorial extent: England and Wales

Dates
- Royal assent: 1 April 1542
- Commencement: 1 November 1542 (Note: Section 1. The Feast of All Saints)
- Repealed: 1 January 1968

Other legislation
- Amended by: Offences Against the Person Act 1828; Criminal Law (India) Act 1828; Coroners Act 1887; Statute Law Revision Act 1888; Larceny Act 1916; Criminal Justice Act 1948; Murder (Abolition of Death Penalty) Act 1965
- Repealed by: Criminal Law Act 1967

Status: Repealed

Text of statute as originally enacted

The Offences within the Court Act 1541 (33 Hen. 8. c. 12) was an act of the Parliament of England.

== Subsequent developments ==
Section 13 of the act was repealed by section 48(1) of, and the schedule to, the Larceny Act 1916 (6 & 7 Geo. 5. c. 50), which came into force on 1 January 1917.

The whole act was repealed by section 10(2) of, and part I of schedule 3 to, the Criminal Law Act 1967, which came into force on 1 January 1968.
