= Portrait of the Duke of Wellington (Goya) =

Painting by Francisco de Goya

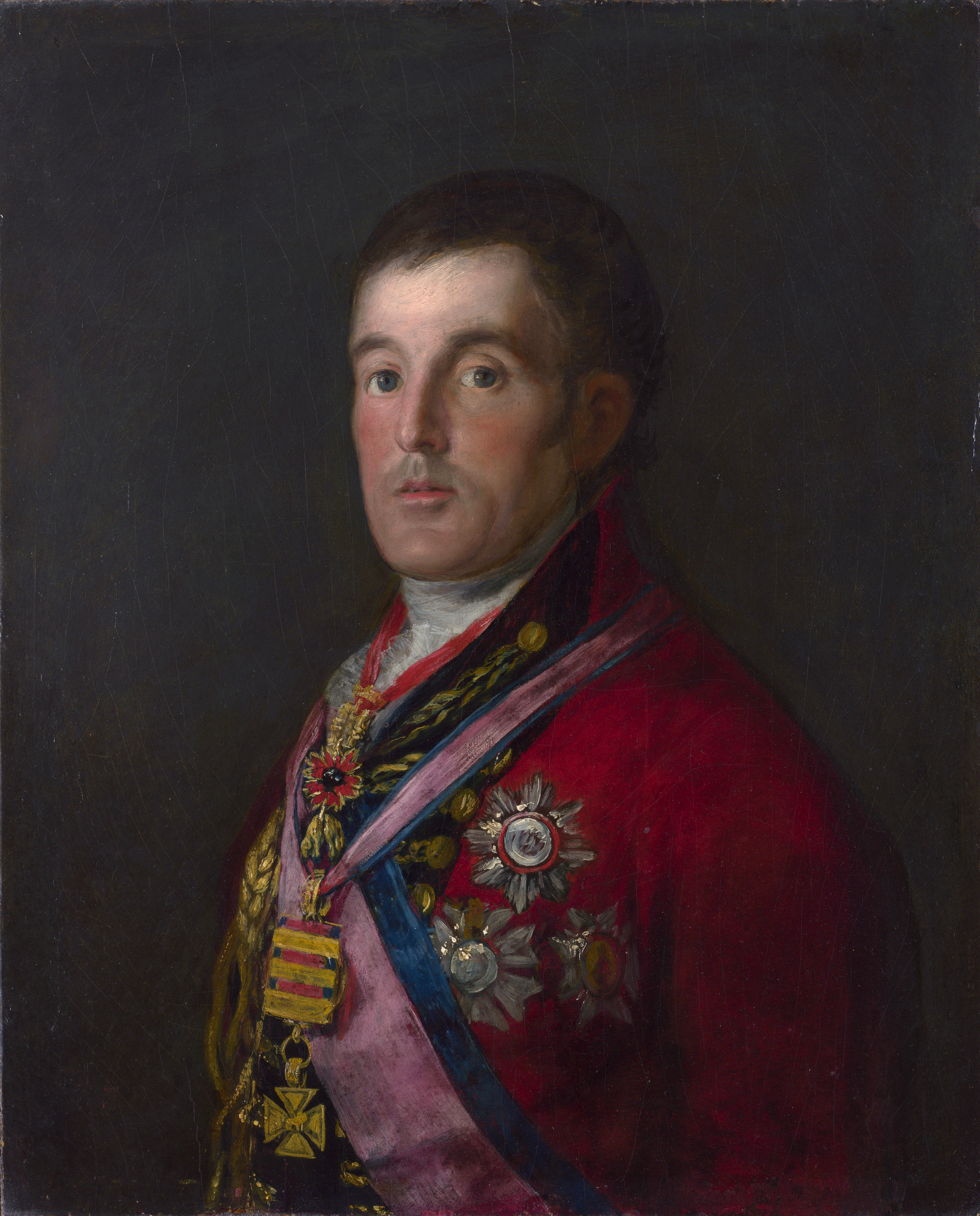
- Artist: Francisco de Goya
- Year: 1812–1814
- Medium: Oil on mahogany panel
- Dimensions: 64.3 cm × 52.4 cm (25.3 in × 20.6 in)
- Location: National Gallery, London

The Portrait of the Duke of Wellington is an oil on panel painting by the Spanish artist Francisco de Goya of the British general Arthur Wellesley, 1st Duke of Wellington, during the latter's service in the Peninsular War.

Goya painted three portraits of Wellington. This one was begun in August 1812 after Wellington's entry into Madrid. It shows the Duke in a bright red or scarlet uniform, wearing the Peninsular Medal. The artist modified the panel in 1814 to show him in full dress uniform with black gold–braided lapels and added the Order of the Golden Fleece and Military Gold Cross with three clasps—both of which Wellington had been awarded in the interim.

== Description ==
The painting was probably made from life, at sittings in Madrid, and painted in oils on a mahogany panel. Although a successful general, the Wellington depicted by Goya is tired from the long campaigning, having won a victory at the Battle of Salamanca on 22 July 1812 before triumphantly entering Madrid on 12 August 1812. The half-length portrait shows the subject in a three-quarter profile, facing to his right, with the head turned slightly to the left, towards the viewer. He is standing upright, with his head held high, perhaps to combat his relatively modest stature.

The face is carefully painted, but much of the painting was done quickly, with great energy, with the military orders outlined with a few brushstrokes. In some areas, such as the eyes and mouth, the brown priming remains visible to create a stronger contrast between light and dark areas of paint.

His uniform bears the insignia of several military orders. His left breast bears three stars: the British Order of the Bath (top, awarded in 1804), the Portuguese Order of the Tower and Sword (lower left, awarded in 1811) and the Spanish Order of San Fernando (lower right, awarded in 1812). He wears two broad sashes over his right shoulder: the pink sash of the Order of Bath over the blue sash of the Order of the Tower and Sword. Around his neck hangs the Order of the Golden Fleece (awarded in August 1812) on a red ribbon, the Military Gold Cross lying lower on longer crimson and blue ribbons. Wellington was entitled to all nine gold clasps to the Military Gold Cross, but only three are shown, perhaps signifying the battles fought before the painting was started in the summer of 1812.

In 1812, Goya also completed a chalk drawing of Wellington, now held by the British Museum, and a large contemporary oil-on-canvas Equestrian portrait of the Duke of Wellington, now at Apsley House.

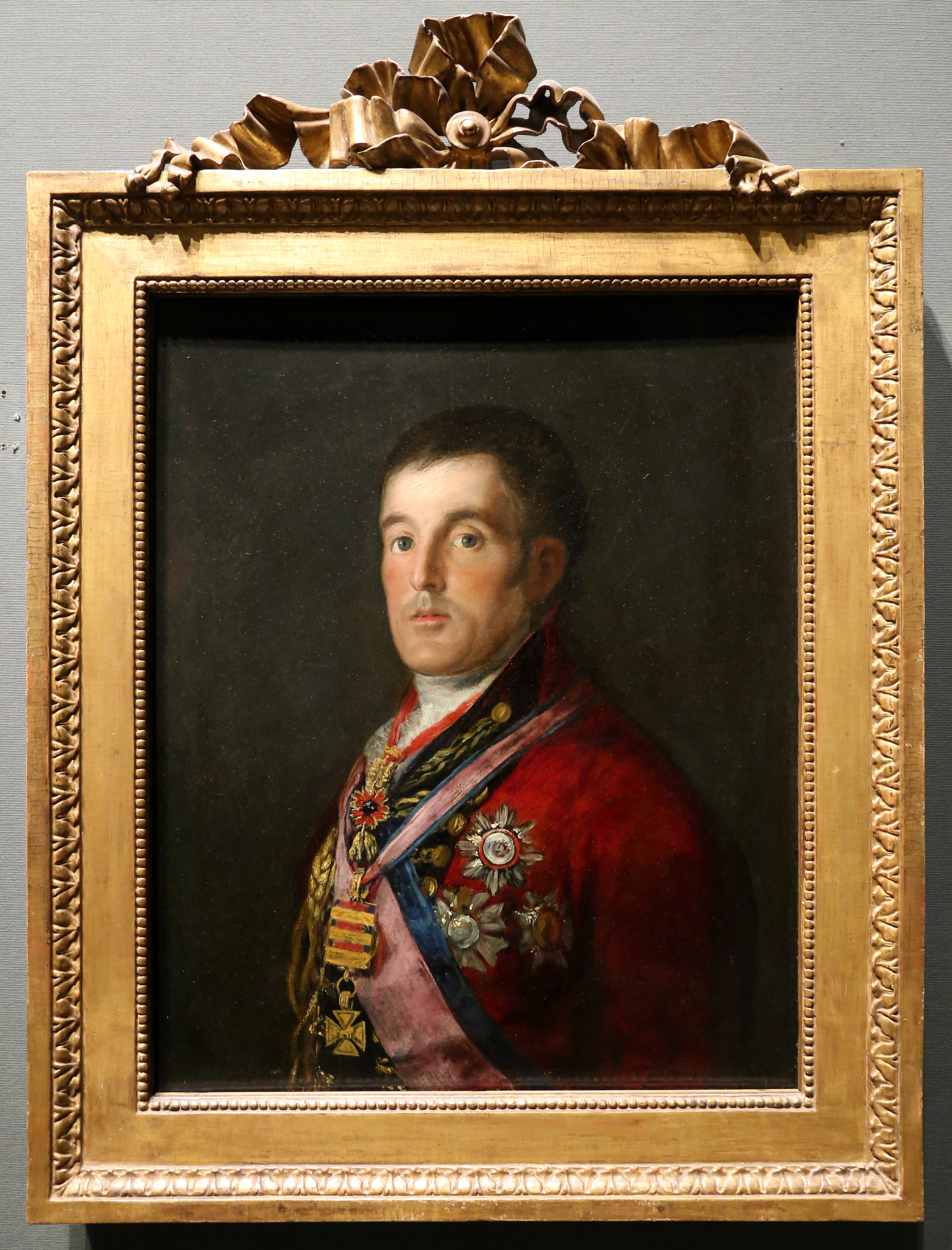
Framed painting

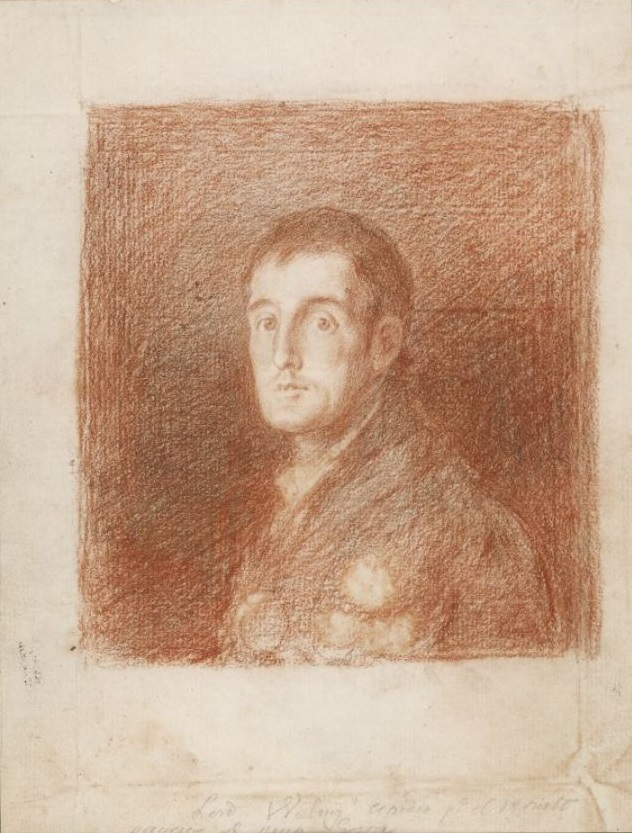
Goya's chalk drawing of Wellington, 1812, British Museum

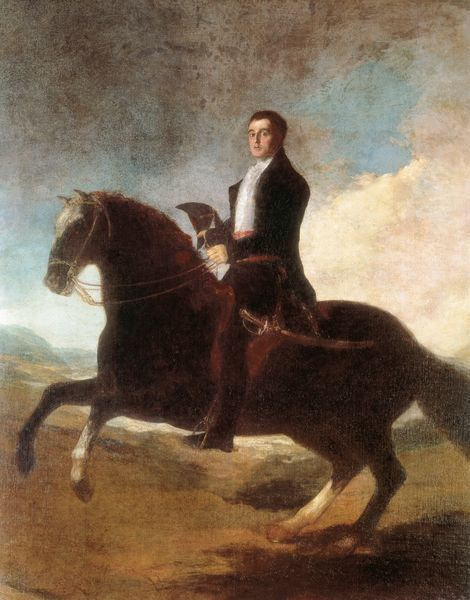
Goya's Equestrian Portrait of the 1st Duke of Wellington, 1812, Apsley House

== Provenance ==
The painting was acquired by the Duke of Wellington, and came into the possession of Louisa Catherine Caton—wife of Francis D'Arcy-Osborne, 7th Duke of Leeds, and sister-in-law of Wellington's older brother Richard Wellesley, 1st Marquess Wellesley. Her first husband, Felton Hervey-Bathurst, fought with Wellington in the Iberian Peninsula, commanding the 14th Light Dragoons from 1811 to 1814, and then on Wellington's staff in the Waterloo Campaign and Wellington's representative at the signing of the Convention of St. Cloud on 3 July 1815.

It had descended to John Osborne, 11th Duke of Leeds, by the time it was put up for auction at Sotheby's in 1961. The New York collector Charles Wrightsman bid £140,000 (equivalent to £2,718,428 in 2025), but the Wolfson Foundation offered £100,000 and the government added a special Treasury grant of £40,000, matching Wrightsman's bid and obtaining the painting for the National Gallery in London, where it was first put on display on 2 August 1961.

== Theft ==
On 21 August 1961, nineteen days after it was put on display at the National Gallery, the portrait was stolen by John Bunton, son of bus driver Kempton Bunton. Four years after the theft, Kempton Bunton contacted a newspaper, and through a left-luggage office at Birmingham New Street railway station returned the painting voluntarily. Kempton confessed in July 1965 that he took the painting and its frame. Following a high-profile trial in which he was defended by Jeremy Hutchinson, QC, Kempton Bunton was found not guilty of stealing the painting, but guilty of stealing the frame which had not been returned.

The incident entered popular culture when referenced in the 1962 James Bond film Dr. No. In the film, the painting is on display in Dr. Julius No's lair, suggesting the first Bond villain was involved. The prop painted by Ken Adam used in the film's promotion was later itself stolen. The theft was the subject of the October 2015 BBC Radio 4 drama Kempton and the Duke. The story of the theft and the following trial of Bunton was dramatised in the film The Duke, directed by Roger Michell and starring Jim Broadbent and Helen Mirren, which was released in cinemas in the UK on 25 February 2022.
