= Jeremy Hutchinson, Baron Hutchinson of Lullington =

British barrister (1915-2017)

The Right Honourable The Lord Hutchinson of Lullington QC

Member of the House of Lords
- Lord Temporal
- Life peerage 16 May 1978 – 3 October 2011

Personal details
- Born: 28 March 1915
- Died: 13 November 2017 (aged 102)
- Party: Liberal Democrats (from 1988)
- Other political affiliations: Labour (1945–1978); Liberal (1979–1981); SDP (1981–1988)
- Spouse: Peggy Ashcroft (m. 1940; div. 1966) June Osborn (m. 1966; died 2006)
- Children: 2
- Parents: St John Hutchinson (father); Mary Barnes (mother)
- Relatives: Emily Loizeau (granddaughter)
- Education: Magdalen College, Oxford (BA)
- Profession: Barrister

Jeremy Nicolas Hutchinson, Baron Hutchinson of Lullington, QC (28 March 1915 – 13 November 2017) was an English barrister. Standing as a Labour candidate in the 1945 general election, he finally entered Parliament as a life peer in 1978, eventually voting with the Liberal Democrats.

== Early life and education ==
Hutchinson was born on 28 March 1915 in Chelsea, London, England. He was the oldest son of St John Hutchinson, KC, a barrister, and his wife, Mary Barnes, a writer and fringe member of the Bloomsbury Group. and was descended from a regicide of Charles I, Colonel John Hutchinson of Owthorpe. He was educated at Stowe School. He studied Modern Greats (now called Philosophy, Politics and Economics) at Magdalen College, Oxford, graduating with a Bachelor of Arts (BA) degree; as per tradition, his BA was later promoted to a Master of Arts (MA Oxon) degree.

== Career ==
Hutchinson was called to the Bar in the Middle Temple in 1939. However, he soon joined the Royal Naval Volunteer Reserve to serve during the Second World War. He survived the sinking of the destroyer HMS Kelly during the Battle of Crete in 1941, due to being on deck when it was attacked. In 1944, he was posted to Caserta, Italy, and there he prosecuted his first case as a barrister: the capital murder trial of soldier who was duly convicted of a gang-related murder. He was demobilised in 1946.

He was the Labour Party candidate for the constituency of Westminster Abbey at the 1945 general election; he canvassed 10 Downing Street and when informed that the "tenant" (Prime Minister Winston Churchill) was out of the country, he addressed the staff.

He worked on the defence team in the Lady Chatterley trial in 1960 and became a Queen's Counsel in 1961. He was a Bencher, Recorder of Bath and of the Crown Court between 1963 and 1988. He also led the defence of Kempton Bunton, charged with the theft of the Goya portrait of the Duke of Wellington in 1965 but who was acquitted of all charges save for the theft of the frame.

He led the defence of director Michael Bogdanov in 1982 against a charge of gross indecency in the play The Romans in Britain by Howard Brenton. The private prosecution by Christian morality campaigner Mary Whitehouse was defeated when the chief witness against Bogdanov, Whitehouse's solicitor, Graham Ross-Cornes, revealed under cross-examination that he had been sitting at the back of the theatre when he saw what was claimed to be a penis. The prosecution withdrew after Hutchinson demonstrated that Ross-Cornes could have witnessed the actor's thumb protruding from his fist and the case was ended after the Attorney-General entered a nolle prosequi.

Hutchinson was a member of the Committee on Immigration Appeals and of the Committee on Identification Procedures. Hutchinson was vice-chairman of the Arts Council of Great Britain and a professor of law at the Royal Academy of Arts. At the Tate Gallery, he was first a trustee and then chairman (1980–84) and was also chairman of London Historic House Museum Trust (1988–93).

=== House of Lords ===
On 16 May 1978, Hutchinson was created a life peer with the title Baron Hutchinson of Lullington, of Lullington in the County of East Sussex. He initially sat in the House of Lords as a Labour peer. However, he crossed the floor and joined the Liberal Party in 1979, and he then joined the Social Democratic Party (SDP) in 1981. The Liberal Party and the SDP merged in 1988 to create the Social and Liberal Democrats, later renamed as the Liberal Democrats, and he would then sit in the Lords with this party until his retirement.

He later took leave of absence from the House of Lords. On 3 October 2011, he became one of the first two peers to retire from membership under a newly instituted procedure. Following the death of Edward Short, Baron Glenamara, in May 2012, Hutchinson became the oldest living life peer. Hutchinson was four years older than Lord Carrington, who was the oldest sitting member of the House of Lords.

== Personal life and death ==
In 1940, Hutchinson married his first wife, actress Peggy Ashcroft, with whom he had two children:

- Hon Eliza Hutchinson (born 1941)
- Hon Nicholas St John Hutchinson (born 1946)

He had six grandchildren including Emily Loizeau.

Hutchinson and Ashcroft divorced in early 1966 and he married June Osborn (née Capel) on 7 May 1966. She was the posthumous daughter of Boy Capel. His second wife died on 26 September 2006.

In October 2013, Hutchinson appeared as a guest on BBC Radio 4's Desert Island Discs. His musical choices were: "Don't Have any More Missus Moore," by Lily Morris, "Dance of the Miller's Wife" from The Three-Cornered Hat by de Falla, "Tea for Two" by Teddy Wilson, "Ah Dite alla giovine" by Giuseppe Verdi, "The Rumble" from West Side Story, the Andante from Piano concerto in C major by Mozart, "L'autre bout du Monde" by Emily Loizeau and the Sonata Opus 110 by Beethoven.

Hutchinson lived in Sussex and London. He died on 13 November 2017, aged 102.
