= R v Collins =

English court case involving trespass

- Court: Court of Appeal – Criminal Division
- Decided: 5 May 1972
- Citation: [1973] QB 100; [1972] 3 WLR 243; 2 All ER 1105; 56 Cr App R 554
- Cases cited: None
- Legislation cited: Theft Act 1968, Section 9(1)(a)

Case history
- Prior action: Trial at Essex Assizes (Crown Court at Colchester)
- Subsequent action: None

Court membership
- Judges sitting: Edmund Davies and Stephenson L.JJ. and Boreham J.

Keywords
- Burglary with intent to rape; Trespass

R v Collins [1973] QB 100 was an English Court of Appeal of England and Wales case which examined the meaning of "enters as a trespasser" in the definition of burglary.

Collins was a 19-year-old workman with access to a ladder that he used after a late-night drinking session to climb into an 18-year-old woman's bedroom in order to have sex. In the Crown Court he was convicted of burglary with intent to commit rape. This was overturned on appeal.

== Facts ==
The victim had seen her boyfriend a few hours before the relevant intercourse in question, who was blond and of a similar build to the defendant. She was somewhat inebriated when they parted and she went to bed; she slept naked that July night in her room, the location of which the defendant knew having done some work in the house. At 02:00 the defendant climbed the ladder, caught sight of the sleeping woman, stripped to his socks, and rested kneeling on the sill – he "was just pulling [him]self in" to ask for sex when the victim awoke, and immediately believed she was greeting her boyfriend. The two had sex in bed. In conversation afterwards the victim realised her mistake (making a mistake of identity) and struck and bit her unintended partner; no charges were placed for this reaction. He left the house. His account that he would not have entered were it not for the invitation was rejected by the jury. He had stated in evidence that it was his firm intention to "have his way with a girl" that night.

== Trial and appeal ==
The defence barrister submitted during the trial that because she had invited him into her bedroom, even under a mistake of fact, Collins had not "entered as a trespasser". The judge rejected this. The judge made mistakes. He should have listed all issues very relevant to make out the offence under the statute. At least two were not put to the jury:

- as to where exactly Collins had been at the time of her mistaken invitation—outside the window on the outer sill or already inside the bedroom—and the evidence was inconclusive on that point;
- as to whether it was reckless entry to assume the embrace was intended for him which the victim intended towards her boyfriend entering the room. If so it should be stated that reckless entry, believing or having good reason to think he was not invited, would amount to trespass.

== Decision ==
The point in issue had never been adjudicated one so there was no authority on which the court could rely; instead, three completing analyses of the most distinguished textbooks were weighed up.

Having examined these, the court ruled that the person entering

must do so knowing that he is a trespasser and nevertheless deliberately enters, or, at the very least, is reckless as to whether or not he is entering the premises of another without the other party's consent.

— Lord Justice Edmund-Davies

The court considered that on the facts, the judge had misdirected the jury on this test. It was also considered, obiter, that civil law concepts such as trespass ab initio and her occupancy status were irrelevant to the criminal law.

The court allowed the appeal on the basis that the jury had never been invited to consider

- whether Collins was a trespasser
  - when he rested on the sill; and then
  - when he fully entered X's bedroom.
- even if he were not on the ordinary basis a trespasser, whether he was reckless as to his entry on the basis of consent not intended for him and should have realised himself to be a trespasser.

The conviction was duly quashed.
