= Theft Act 1968 =

Act of the Parliament of the United Kingdom

Theft Act 1968 (Note: Section 36(1).)
- Act of Parliament
- Parliament of the United Kingdom
- Long title: An Act to revise the law of England and Wales as to theft and similar or associated offences, and in connection therewith to make provision as to criminal proceedings by one party to a marriage against the other, and to make certain amendments extending beyond England and Wales in the Post Office Act 1953 and other enactments; and for other purposes connected therewith.
- Citation: 1968 c. 60
- Territorial extent: England and Wales (Note: Section 36(3).)

Dates
- Royal assent: 26 July 1968
- Commencement: 1 January 1969 (Note: Section 35(1).)

Other legislation
- Amends: See § Repealed enactments
- Repeals/revokes: See § Repealed enactments
- Amended by: Courts Act 1971; Road Traffic Act 1972; Criminal Justice Act 1972; Northern Ireland Constitution Act 1973; Consumer Credit Act 1974; Criminal Jurisdiction Act 1975; Theft Act 1978; Prosecution of Offences Act 1979; Magistrates’ Courts Act 1980; Deer Act 1980; British Telecommunications Act 1981; Criminal Justice Act 1982; Nuclear Material (Offences) Act 1983; Police and Criminal Evidence Act 1984; Insolvency Act 1985; Criminal Justice Act 1988; Extradition Act 1989; Criminal Justice Act 1991; Aggravated Vehicle-Taking Act 1992; Youth Justice and Criminal Evidence Act 1999; Powers of Criminal Courts (Sentencing) Act 2000; Vehicles (Crime) Act 2001; Criminal Justice and Police Act 2001; Postal Services Act 2000 (Consequential Modifications No. 1) Order 2001; Sexual Offences Act 2003; Criminal Justice Act 2003; Postal Services Act 2000 (Consequential Modifications) Order 2003; Civil Partnership Act 2004; Gambling Act 2005; Fraud Act 2006; Serious Crime Act 2007; Marine and Coastal Access Act 2009; Financial Services Act 2012; Automated Vehicles Act 2024
- Relates to: Theft Act (Northern Ireland) 1969

Status: Amended

Text of statute as originally enacted

Revised text of statute as amended

Text of the Theft Act 1968 as in force today (including any amendments) within the United Kingdom, from legislation.gov.uk.

The Theft Act 1968 (c. 60) is an act of the Parliament of the United Kingdom. It creates a number of offences against property in England and Wales.

On 15 January 2007 the Fraud Act 2006 came into force, redefining most of the offences of deception.

== History ==
The act resulted from the efforts of the Criminal Law Revision Committee to reform the English law of theft. The Larceny Act 1916 (6 & 7 Geo. 5. c. 50) had codified the common law, including larceny itself, but it remained a complex web of offences. The intention of the Theft Act 1968 was to replace the existing law of larceny and other deception-related offences, by a single enactment, creating a more coherent body of principles that would allow the law to evolve to meet new situations.

== Provisions ==
A number of greatly simplified – or at least less complicated – offences were created.

=== Section 1 – Basic definition of "theft" ===
This section creates the offence of theft. This definition is supplemented by sections 2 to 6. The definition of theft under the Theft Act 1968 is:

A person is guilty of theft if he dishonestly appropriates property belonging to another with the intention of permanently depriving the other of it; and "thief" and "steal" shall be construed accordingly.

=== Section 2 – "Dishonestly" ===
Subsection (1) states situations in which appropriation will not be dishonest.

Subsection (2) specifies that appropriation may be dishonest even if the accused is willing to pay.

The definition itself is a common law one.

=== Section 3 – "Appropriation" ===
Appropriation is defined as "Any assumption by a person of the rights of an owner".

The courts have interpreted the assumption "of the rights of an owner" to mean that a person assumes at least one of a set of rights rather than having to assume all of the rights of the owners. This interpretation of the legislation was originally given in the case of R v Morris; Anderton v Burnside [1984] UKHL 1, and it has been endorsed by the decision in R v Gomez [1993] AC 442.

=== Section 4 – "Property" ===
The definition of property is:

any property including money and all other property, real or personal, including things in action and other intangible property

=== Section 5 – "Belonging to another" ===
The definition of belonging to another is

Property shall be regarded as belonging to any person having possession or control of it, or having in it any proprietary right or interest (not being an equitable interest arising only from an agreement to transfer or grant an interest).

It is possible to have a proprietary right or interest over property that in the ordinary sense belongs to someone else. In the case of R v Turner (No. 2) [1971] 1 WLR 901, the Court of Appeal found that a man had committed theft by driving away his car without having paid for repairs made on the car. The garage that repaired his car had a proprietary right over it.

One can have a controlling interest in a piece of property even after selling it. In R v Marshall [1998] 2 Cr App R 282, a group of defendants resold used tickets for the London Underground. The Court of Appeal dismissed their appeal in part because the tickets said they were the property of London Underground, a condition of sale agreed to by the original buyer of the ticket.

Section 5 includes subsections that deal with possession that has conditions. Section 5(3) deals with situations where a person has given property to another for a particular purpose: the person receiving the property is said to be engaging in theft if they use the property for some purpose it was not intended. If A gives B money to purchase a particular good for A and B buys something else with it without A's consent, even though the property is not in A's hands, A still has a controlling interest in it under Section 5(3).

If one is placed under a duty to use property in a particular way, that obligation must be legal under civil law according to the Court of Appeal in R v Breaks and Huggan (1998).

There are limits to the legal obligations one is liable for under Section 5(3). In R v Hall (1972), a customer paid a deposit to a travel agent. The deposit was paid into the company's bank account but the travel agent went out of business. This was not an instance of theft as the money was legitimately paid as a deposit against cancellation and there was no specific obligation to spend the money in a particular way.

Section 5(4) requires that if property is received by mistake it must be returned and failure to do so counts as appropriation. This was seen in action in Attorney-General's Reference (No. 1 of 1983) where a police officer was given £74 extra in her wages but failed to return it or alert her superiors to it. The Court of Appeal held it to be theft.

=== Section 6 – "Intention to permanently deprive" ===
This section provides that a person in order to be guilty of theft had the intention of permanently depriving the other of the property. In certain cases, the intention to deprive may be construed, even when the person may not have meant to deprive another of their property permanently, for example if the intention is to treat another's property as one's own to dispose of regardless of the other's rights.

=== Section 7 – Theft ===
This section provides that a person convicted of theft on indictment is liable to imprisonment to a term not exceeding seven years.

=== Section 8 – Robbery ===
Section 8(1) creates the offence of robbery (theft by force or threat of force). Section 8(2) provides that a person convicted on indictment of robbery or assault with intent to rob is liable to imprisonment for life. Common assault itself is defined at common law.

=== Section 9 – Burglary ===
This section codifies the offence of burglary and provides for penalties for that offence on conviction on indictment. The offence consists of entering a building (including an "inhabited vehicle or vessel", such as a caravan or ship, and regardless of whether any inhabitant is there at the time) as a trespasser, either with intent to commit (section 9(1)(a)), or actually committing or attempting to commit (section 9(1)(b)), an offence of theft, grievous bodily harm, or criminal damage. "Theft" for this purpose includes taking a conveyance without consent contrary to section 12(1). The maximum sentence is ten years' imprisonment, or fourteen years if the building is a dwelling.

The inclusion of the civil concept of trespass was a significant departure from the definition under the Larceny Act 1916, which not only required the act to occur at night but also to involve breaking and entering. The cases of R v Collins and R v Jones & Smith settled the meaning of trespass in criminal law.

The entry may be by entry of the full body, entry of part of the body or entry by an instrument.

Originally, rape was one of the offences that could lead to a charge of burglary. This very narrow definition was replaced with the more general offence of trespass with intent to commit a sexual offence by section 63 of the Sexual Offences Act 2003. Trespass is usually a civil matter in English law.

=== Section 10 – Aggravated burglary ===
Section 10(1) creates the offence of aggravated burglary, which involves the use of weapons or explosives. Section 10(2) provides that a person guilty of that offence is liable, on conviction on indictment, to imprisonment for life.

=== Section 11 – Removal of articles from places open to the public ===
This section creates the offence of removing an article from a place open to the public and provides that a person guilty of that offence is liable, on conviction on indictment, to imprisonment for a term not exceeding five years.

=== Section 12 – Taking motor vehicle or other conveyance without authority ===
Section 12(1) creates an offence of taking a conveyance without authority (referred to in police jargon as "taking without consent" or TWOC), which falls short of theft in that there is no intent to permanently deprive the owner of possession. "Conveyance" includes a land, water or air vehicle, but not an unmanned or remote-controlled vehicle, nor a pedal cycle. It is a summary offence with a maximum sentence of a level 5 fine on the standard scale (i.e. an unlimited fine) or six months' imprisonment, or both.

Section 12(4) allows a jury to return a verdict of TWOC on an indictment for theft of a vehicle.

Section 12(5) creates a separate offence of taking a pedal cycle.

=== Section 12A – Aggravated vehicle-taking ===
This section, which was added by the Aggravated Vehicle-Taking Act 1992, creates an offence of aggravated vehicle taking, which involves either dangerous driving or causing injury or damage. It can only be committed in respect of a motor vehicle. It is an indictable offence carrying a maximum sentence of two years, or fourteen if it causes a person's death.

=== Section 13 – Abstracting of electricity ===
This section creates the offence of abstracting electricity. It replaces section 10 of the Larceny Act 1916. It is an indictable offence with a maximum sentence of five years.

=== Section 14 – Thefts from mails outside England and Wales ===
This section provides that theft of or from mail bags being transported between jurisdictions in Britain (including the Isle of Man and the Channel Islands), and robbery etc. during such a theft, can be prosecuted as though it was committed in England and Wales, even if the offence was committed elsewhere. This removes the burden on the prosecution to prove, for example, exactly where a train was when a theft took place on it.

=== Section 15 – Obtaining property by deception ===
This section created the offence of obtaining property by deception, a statutory version of the common law offence of cheating, and provided a definition of deception for the purpose of that offence and the offences under sections 15A, 16 and 20(2) of the act and sections 1 and 2 of the Theft Act 1978. It was repealed and replaced by the more general offence of fraud under the Fraud Act 2006.

=== Sections 15A and 15B – Obtaining a money transfer by deception ===
Section 15A created the offence of obtaining a money transfer by deception. Section 15B made supplementary provision. They were repealed and replaced by the more general offence of fraud under the Fraud Act 2006.

=== Section 16 – Obtaining pecuniary advantage by deception ===
This section created the offence of obtaining pecuniary advantage by deception. It was repealed and replaced by the more general offence of fraud under the Fraud Act 2006.

=== Section 17 – False accounting ===
This section creates an offence of false accounting. It is an indictable offence with a maximum sentence of seven years.

=== Section 18 – Liability of company officers for certain offences by company ===
This section makes officers of corporations liable for offences under section 17 committed by the company where the offence was committed with the "consent or connivance" of that officer. Originally this also applied to offences under sections 15 and 16, but this was replaced by the offence of participating in a fraudulent business under section 9 of the Fraud Act 2006.

=== Section 19 – False statements by company directors etc ===
This section adds liability for any officer of a corporation or unincorporated association who publishes false accounts with intent to deceive members or creditors of the body corporate or association about its affairs. It is an indictable offence with a maximum sentence of seven years.

=== Section 20 – Suppression, etc, of documents ===
Section 20(1) creates the offence of dishonestly destroying, defacing or concealing certain documents with intent to make a gain for oneself or loss for another. It is an indictable offence with a maximum sentence of seven years.

Section 20(2) created the offence of procuring the execution of a valuable security by deception. This was replaced by fraud under the Fraud Act 2006.

=== Section 21 – Blackmail ===
This section creates the offence of blackmail. It is an indictable offence with a maximum sentence of fourteen years.

=== Section 22 – Handling stolen goods ===
This section creates the offence of handling stolen goods. It is an indictable offence with a maximum sentence of fourteen years.

=== Section 23 – Advertising rewards for return of goods stolen or lost ===
This section replaces section 102 of the Larceny Act 1861. The offence is made out only if an advertisement offers a reward for the return of the goods, and uses words to the effect that "no questions will be asked" or claims to ensure that the person "will be safe from apprehension or inquiry". The printer or publisher is liable as well as the advertiser.

A person guilty of an offence under this section is liable, on summary conviction, to a fine not exceeding level 3 on the standard scale.

=== Section 24 – Scope of offences relating to stolen goods ===
This section defines "stolen goods" for the purpose of relevant offences. In particular, goods stolen outside England and Wales (by way of a criminal offence in the relevant jurisdiction), and goods obtained by blackmail or fraud (within the meaning of the Fraud Act 2006), though not the object of an offence of theft under the act, nonetheless qualify as stolen.

=== Section 24A – Dishonestly retaining a wrongful credit ===
This section, added by the Theft (Amendment) Act 1996 and amended by the Fraud Act 2006, prohibits receiving a transfer of money to one's account that one knows or believes derives from theft, blackmail, fraud, or stolen goods, and dishonestly not trying to cancel the transfer. It is an indictable offence with a maximum sentence of ten years.

=== Section 25 – Going equipped ===
This section creates an offence of "going equipped" for burglary or theft. It is described by the marginal note to that section as "going equipped for stealing, etc", and by the preceding crossheading as "possession of housebreaking implements, etc". It includes any item that is designed to be used to carry out a theft or burglary, as well as any items made specifically by a thief for use in committing a burglary, etc. It is an indictable offence with a maximum sentence of three years.

The offence originally applied also to the offence under section 15 of the act, as a statutory version of the common law offence of going equipped to cheat (obtain property by deception). This application was replaced by section 6 of the Fraud Act 2006.

=== Repealed enactments ===
Section 33(3) of the act repealed 116 enactments, listed in parts I, II and III of the schedule 3 to the act.

Part I – Penal enactments superseded by this act
Citation	Short title	Extent of repeal
3 Edw. 1	Statute of Westminster the First	Chapters 26 and 31.
15 Geo. 2. c. 33	Starr and Bent Act 1741	The whole act.
22 Geo. 2. c. 27	Frauds by Workmen Act 1748	The whole act.
17 Geo. 3. c. 11	Worsted Act 1776	In section 12 the words from 'or shall conceal' to 'other purposes'.
17 Geo. 3. c. 56	Frauds by Workmen Act 1777	The whole act.
50 Geo. 3. c. 59	Embezzlement by Collectors Act 1810	The whole act, so far as unrepealed.
55 Geo. 3. c. 50	Gaol Fees Abolition Act 1815	The whole act.
5 Geo. 4. c. 83	Vagrancy Act 1824	In section 4 the words from 'having in his or her custody' to 'outbuilding, or,' together with the words 'and every such picklock key, crow, jack, bit, and other implement'.
7 Geo. 4. c. 16	Chelsea and Kilmainham Hospitals Act 1826	Sections 25, 34 (partial), 38.
2 & 3 Vict. c. 47	Metropolitan Police Act 1839	Sections 26, 27, 28, 30 and 31.
2 & 3 Vict. c. 71	Metropolitan Police Courts Act 1839	Section 26.
3 & 4 Vict. c. 50	Canals (Offences) Act 1840	Sections 7 and 8.
3 & 4 Vict. c. 84	Metropolitan Police Courts Act 1840	Section 11.
6 & 7 Vict. c. 40	Hosiery Act 1843	The whole act, except sections 18 to 20.
10 & 11 Vict. c. 16	Commissioners Clauses Act 1847	In section 67 the words 'exact or'.
24 & 25 Vict. c. 96	Larceny Act 1861	The whole act.
24 & 25 Vict. c. 98	Forgery Act 1861	Section 3.
26 & 27 Vict. c. 103	Misappropriation by Servants Act 1863	The whole act.
28 & 29 Vict. c. 124	Admiralty Powers, &c. Act 1865	Sections 6 to 9, together with the words 'of all offences specified in this Act, and' in section 5.
32 & 33 Vict. c. 62	Debtors Act 1869	In section 13, paragraph (1).
33 & 34 Vict. c. 58	Forgery Act 1870	The whole act, so far as unrepealed.
34 & 35 Vict. c. 41	Gas Works Clauses Act 1871	In section 38, as incorporated in the Electric Lighting Act 1882, the words 'or fraudulently abstracts, consumes or uses gas of the undertakers', the words 'or for abstracting, consuming or using gas of undertakers' and the words 'abstraction or consumption'.
37 & 38 Vict. c. 36	False Personation Act 1874	The whole act.
38 & 39 Vict. c. 24	Falsification of Accounts Act 1875	The whole act.
38 & 39 Vict. c. 89	Public Works Loans Act 1875	Section 44.
47 & 48 Vict. c. 55	Pensions and Yeomanry Pay Act 1884	Section 3.
50 & 51 Vict. c. 55	Sheriffs Act 1887	In section 29, subsection (2)(b) and in subsection (6) the words from 'or demands' to 'office'.
50 & 51 Vict. c. 71	Coroners Act 1887	In section 8(2) the words 'of extortion or'.
54 & 55 Vict. c. 36	Consular Salaries and Fees Act 1891	Section 2(3).
57 & 58 Vict. c. 60	Merchant Shipping Act 1894	In section 154 paragraph (d), and in paragraph (e) the words 'or representation' and the words 'or made.' In section 180 paragraph (d), and in paragraph (e) the words 'or representation' and the words 'or made.' In section 197(8) paragraph (d). Section 248. Section 388(5) from 'and if' onwards. In section 724(4) the words 'demands or'.
61 & 62 Vict. c. 57	Elementary School Teachers (Superannuation) Act 1898	Section 10.
62 & 63 Vict. c. 19	Electric Lighting (Clauses) Act 1899	In the Schedule, in section 38 of the Gas Works Clauses Act 1871 as set out in the Appendix, the words 'or fraudulently abstracts, consumes or uses gas of the undertakers', the words 'or for abstracting, consuming or using gas of undertakers' and the words 'abstraction or consumption'.
6 Edw. 7. c. 48	Merchant Shipping Act 1906	Section 28(10) from 'and if' onwards.
4 & 5 Geo. 5. c. 59	Bankruptcy Act 1914	In section 154(1), paragraphs (13) and (14). In section 156, paragraph (a). Section 160.
5 & 6 Geo. 5. c. 83	Naval and Military War Pensions, &c. Act 1915	Section 5.
6 & 7 Geo. 5. c. 50	Larceny Act 1916	The whole act (but the repeal of section 39(2) and (3) shall not extend to Scotland).
9 & 10 Geo. 5. c. 75	Ferries (Acquisition by Local Authorities) Act 1919	Section 4 from 'If any' onwards.
10 & 11 Geo. 5. c. 36	Pensions (Increase) Act 1920	Section 5.
11 & 12 Geo. 5. c. 39	Admiralty Pensions Act 1921	Section 1(2).
11 & 12 Geo. 5. c. 49	War Pensions Act 1921	Section 7(2).
19 & 20 Geo. 5. c. 29	Government Annuities Act 1929	Sections 34, 61(2), 64.
23 & 24 Geo. 5. c. 51	Local Government Act 1933	In section 123, in subsection (2), the words 'exact or' and, in subsection (3), the words 'any of'.
2 & 3 Geo. 6. c. 82	Personal Injuries (Emergency Provisions) Act 1939	Section 6.
2 & 3 Geo. 6. c. 83	Pensions (Navy, Army, Air Force and Mercantile Marine) Act 1939	Section 8.
5 & 6 Geo. 6. c. 28	War Damage (Amendment) Act 1942	Section 3.
6 & 7 Geo. 6. c. 21	War Damage Act 1943	Section 112.
7 & 8 Geo. 6. c. 21	Pensions (Increase) Act 1944	Sections 6 and 7.
8 & 9 Geo. 6. c. 42	Water Act 1945	In Schedule 3, section 65(2): in section 66(1) the words 'or fraudulently abstracts or uses water of the undertakers': in section 66(2) the words 'or for enabling him fraudulently to abstract or use water' and the words from 'or as' onwards.
10 & 11 Geo. 6. c. 41	Fire Services Act 1947	In section 26(4) the words from 'by means of' to 'infirmity or', where next occurring, and the words 'or by any other fraudulent conduct'.
11 & 12 Geo. 6. c. 24	Police Pensions Act 1948	In section 7(2) the words from 'by means of' to 'infirmity or', where next occurring, and the words 'or by any other fraudulent conduct'.
11 & 12 Geo. 6. c. 38	Companies Act 1948	Section 84. In section 328(1), paragraphs (m) and (n) and any reference to either of those paragraphs. Section 330(a).
11 & 12 Geo. 6. c. 67	Gas Act 1948	In Schedule 3, in paragraph 29(1), the words 'or fraudulently abstracts, consumes or uses gas of the Board,' and in paragraph 29(3) the words 'or for abstracting, consuming or using gas of the Board' and the words 'abstraction or consumption'.
14 Geo. 6. c. 36	Diseases of Animals Act 1950	Section 78(2)(x).
15 & 16 Geo. 6 & 1 Eliz. 2. c. 10	Income Tax Act 1952	Section 505 (but this repeal shall not extend to Scotland).
15 & 16 Geo. 6 & 1 Eliz. 2. c. 25	National Health Service Act 1952	In section 6 the words from 'he shall' to 'section'.
15 & 16 Geo. 6 & 1 Eliz. 2. c. 43	Disposal of Uncollected Goods Act 1952	In section 3(3) the words from 'or who' to 'particular'.
1 & 2 Eliz. 2. c. 36	Post Office Act 1953	Sections 52 and 54 and in section 57 the words 'steals, or for any purpose whatever embezzles' (but these repeals shall not extend to Scotland).
1 & 2 Eliz. 2. c. 50	Auxiliary Forces Act 1953	Section 29(2).
4 & 5 Eliz. 2. c. 16	Food and Drugs Act 1955	Section 60, so far as unrepealed.
7 & 8 Eliz. 2. c. 28	Income Tax (Repayment of Post-War Credits) Act 1959	Section 1(6) (but this repeal shall not extend to Scotland).
8 & 9 Eliz. 2. c. 16	Road Traffic Act 1960	Section 217 (but this repeal shall not extend to Scotland).
1964 c. 28	Agriculture and Horticulture Act 1964	In the Schedule, paragraph 3 from the words 'or on conviction on indictment' onwards.
1966 c. 32	Selective Employment Payments Act 1966	Section 8(2)(a), (b) and (d) and (ii).
1966 c. 34	Industrial Development Act 1966	Section 9.
1967 c. 1	Land Commission Act 1967	Section 81(5)(a). Section 93.
1967 c. 9	General Rate Act 1967	Section 49(8).
1967 c. 12	Teachers' Superannuation Act 1967	Section 14.
1967 c. 22	Agriculture Act 1967	Section 69(1)(ii).
1967 c. 29	Housing Subsidies Act 1967	Section 31.
1967 c. 34	Industrial Injuries and Diseases (Old Cases) Act 1967	Section 11(1). In section 12(2) the words 'section 11(1) of this Act and'.
1967 c. 85	Vessels Protection Act 1967	The whole act.

Part II – Obsolete and redundant enactments
Citation	Short title	Extent of repeal
34 & 35 Hen. 8. c. 26	Laws in Wales Act 1542	Section 47 from 'Item, that no person' onwards.
36 Geo. 3. c. 88	Hay and Straw Act 1796	The whole act.
5 Geo. 4. c. 83	Vagrancy Act 1824	Sections 16 and 21.
4 & 5 Will. 4. c. 21	Hay and Straw Act 1834	The whole act.
3 & 4 Vict. c. 50	Canals (Offences) Act 1840	Sections 13, 15, 17 and 19.
14 & 15 Vict. c. 19	Prevention of Offences Act 1851	Sections 12 and 13.
18 & 19 Vict. c. 126	Criminal Justice Act 1855	The whole act, so far as unrepealed.
19 & 20 Vict. c. 114	Hay and Straw Act 1856	The whole act.
32 & 33 Vict. c. 57	Seamen's Clothing Act 1869	The whole act.
33 & 34 Vict. c. 65	Larceny (Advertisements) Act 1870	The whole act.
34 & 35 Vict. c. 112	Prevention of Crimes Act 1871	Sections 10 and 11.
39 & 40 Vict. c. 20	Statute Law Revision (Substituted Enactments) Act 1876	Section 4.
59 & 60 Vict. c. 25	Friendly Societies Act 1896	Section 87(2).
61 & 62 Vict. c. 36	Criminal Evidence Act 1898	In the Schedule, the entries for the Vagrancy Act 1824 and for the Prevention of Cruelty to Children Act 1894.
4 & 5 Geo. 5. c. 14	Currency and Bank Notes Act 1914	The whole act.

Part III – Consequential repeals
Citation	Short title	Extent of repeal
2 & 3 Vict. c. 47	Metropolitan Police Act 1839	Section 66 from 'and any person' onwards.
2 & 3 Vict. c. 71	Metropolitan Police Courts Act 1839	Section 25.
3 & 4 Vict. c. 50	Canals (Offences) Act 1840	Section 11 from the beginning to 'law; and'. Section 12.
33 & 34 Vict. c. 52	Extradition Act 1870	In Schedule 1 the entries relating to embezzlement and larceny, to obtaining money or goods by false pretences, to fraud by bailees and others, to burglary and housebreaking, to robbery with violence and to threats by letter or otherwise with intent to extort.
35 & 36 Vict. c. 93	Pawnbrokers Act 1872	In section 30, paragraph (2) (but this repeal shall not extend to Scotland).
38 & 39 Vict. c. 83	Local Loans Act 1875	Section 32.
40 & 41 Vict. c. 59	Colonial Stock Act 1877	Section 21.
45 & 46 Vict. c. 75	Married Women's Property Act 1882	Sections 12 and 16, so far as unrepealed.
47 & 48 Vict. c. 14	Married Women's Property Act 1884	The whole act.
47 & 48 Vict. c. 44	Naval Pensions Act 1884	In section 2 the words 'or the Admiralty (Powers, etc.) Act 1865'.
56 & 57 Vict. c. 71	Sale of Goods Act 1893	Section 24.
60 & 61 Vict. c. 30	Police (Property) Act 1897	In section 1(1) the words 'section 103 of the Larceny Act 1861'.
61 & 62 Vict. c. 36	Criminal Evidence Act 1898	In the Schedule the entry for the Married Women's Property Act 1882.
16 & 17 Geo. 5. c. 7	Bankruptcy (Amendment) Act 1926	In section 5 the words '(13), (14) and' wherever occurring.
25 & 26 Geo. 5. c. 30	Law Reform (Married Women and Tortfeasors) Act 1935	In Schedule 1 the entries amending section 12 of the Married Women's Property Act 1882 and the Larceny Act 1916.
11 & 12 Geo. 6. c. 58	Criminal Justice Act 1948	In section 41, subsection (3), in subsection (4) the words 'or statutory declaration', and in subsection (5) the words 'or statutory declaration' and the words from 'or the person' onwards.
12, 13 & 14 Geo. 6. c. 36	War Damage (Public Utility Undertakings, &c.) Act 1949	Section 10(9)(e).
14 & 15 Geo. 6. c. 39	Common Informers Act 1951	In the Schedule the entry relating to the Larceny Act 1861 section 102.
15 & 16 Geo. 6 & 1 Eliz. 2. c. 45	Pensions (Increase) Act 1952	In Schedule 3 the entries for sections 6 and 7 of 7 & 8 Geo. 6. c. 21.
15 & 16 Geo. 6 & 1 Eliz. 2. c. 55	Magistrates' Courts Act 1952	Section 33. In Schedule 1, entries Nos. 1, 5 and 6.
15 & 16 Geo. 6 & 1 Eliz. 2. c. 67	Visiting Forces Act 1952	In the Schedule, paragraph 1(b)(v) and paragraph 3(a), (d) and (e).
1 & 2 Eliz. 2. c. 36	Post Office Act 1953	In section 23(1), the words 'and of the Larceny Act 1916'.
8 & 9 Eliz. 2. c. 44	Finance Act 1960	Section 55 (but this repeal shall not extend to Scotland).
10 & 11 Eliz. 2. c. 15	Criminal Justice Administration Act 1962	In Schedule 3, paragraphs 4, 5, 6 and 8.
10 & 11 Eliz. 2. c. 46	Transport Act 1962	In Part I of Schedule 2 the entry for the Criminal Justice Act 1948.
10 & 11 Eliz. 2. c. 59	Road Traffic Act 1962	Section 44 (but this repeal shall not extend to Scotland).
1964 c. 26	Licensing Act 1964	Section 100(4)(d).
1967 c. 58	Criminal Law Act 1967	Section 4(7). In Schedule 1, in List A, item 1 in Division II, and, in List B, item 13. In Schedule 2, paragraph 2(1)(a); in paragraph 4 the word 'embezzlement'; paragraph 12, except in sub-paragraph (2) the words from 'in the Bankruptcy Act' onwards and except sub-paragraph (6); and paragraph 13(1)(b).
1968 c. 19	Criminal Appeal Act 1968	In section 30, in subsection (1) the words from 'and the operation' to 'on conviction', in subsection (2) the words 'or of section 24(1) of the Sale of Goods Act 1893' and the words 'or that subsection, as the case may be', and in subsection (3) the words 'or of the said section 24(1)'. Section 42(4).
1968 c. 27	Firearms Act 1968	In section 17, subsection (3) and in subsection (5) the words from 'and' onwards.

=== Commencement, short title and extent ===
Section 35(1) of the act provided that the act would come into force on 1 January 1969.

Section 36(1) of the act provided that the act may be cited as the "Theft Act 1968".

Section 36(3) of the act provided that the act would not extend to Scotland or Northern Ireland except for the repeals of acts by section 33 of the act.

== Key Cases ==
- Ivey v Genting Casinos [2017] UKSC 67 - established current test of dishonesty
- R v Barton and Booth [2020] EWCA Crim 575 - affirmed current test of dishonesty
- R v Collins [1973] QB 100 - trespass, mistaken identity
- R v Ghosh [1982] QB 1053 - previous test of dishonesty
- R v Jones & Smith [1976] 1 WLR 672 - meaning of 'as a trespasser'
- R v Walkington [1979] 1 WLR 1169 - meaning of 'part of a building'

== See also ==
- Theft Act

== Bibliography ==
- Allen, Michael. Textbook on Criminal Law. Oxford: Oxford University Press. (2005) ISBN 0-19-927918-7.
- Criminal Law Revision Committee. 8th Report. Theft and Related Offences. Cmnd. 2977
- Griew, Edward. Theft Acts 1968 & 1978, Sweet & Maxwell. ISBN 0-421-19960-1
- Martin, Jacqueline. Criminal Law for A2, Hodder Arnold (2006). ISBN 978-0-340-91452-6
- Ormerod, David. Smith and Hogan Criminal Law, 11th Ed., Oxford: Oxford University Press. (2005) ISBN 0-406-97730-5
- Smith, J. C. Law of Theft, LexisNexis: London. (1997) ISBN 0-406-89545-7
