= Theft Act (Northern Ireland) 1969 =

Act of the Parliament of Northern Ireland

Theft Act (Northern Ireland) 1969 (Note: Section 34.)
- Act of Parliament
- Parliament of Northern Ireland
- Long title: An Act to revise the law of Northern Ireland as to theft and similar or associated offences; and for purposes connected therewith.
- Citation: 1969 c. 16 (N.I.)
- Territorial extent: Northern Ireland

Dates
- Royal assent: 10 July 1969
- Commencement: 1 August 1969 (Note: Section 33(1).)

Other legislation
- Amends: Larceny Act 1916; Government Annuities Act 1929
- Amended by: Consumer Credit Act 1974; Criminal Appeal (Northern Ireland) Act 1980
- Relates to: Theft Act 1968

Status: Amended

Text of statute as originally enacted

Revised text of statute as amended

Text of the Theft Act (Northern Ireland) 1969 as in force today (including any amendments) within the United Kingdom, from legislation.gov.uk.

The Theft Act (Northern Ireland) 1969 (c. 16 (N.I.)) is an act of the Parliament of Northern Ireland. It makes criminal law provisions for Northern Ireland similar to those made in England and Wales by the Theft Act 1968.

== Provisions ==
The act prohibits the theft of property, including pets. The act prohibits blackmail. The act prohibits the furnishing of false information in certain circumstances.

== Amendment ==
=== Theft (Northern Ireland) Order 1978 ===
The Theft (Northern Ireland) Order 1978 replaced 16(2)(a) of the 1969 concerning "obtaining pecuniary advantage by deception in certain cases" with other measures relating to "fraudulent conduct".

== See also ==
- Theft Act
