= Prescribed sum =

The prescribed sum is the maximum fine that may be imposed on summary conviction of certain offences in the United Kingdom. In England and Wales and Northern Ireland, it is now equivalent to level 5 on the standard scale, which it predates; since 2012 this has meant an unlimited fine. In Scotland, it is now equal to twice level 5 on the standard scale, which is likewise an unlimited fine.

== England and Wales ==
The prescribed sum is defined by section 32(9) of the Magistrates' Courts Act 1980. It can be altered under section 143(1) of that Act.

It was previously defined by section 28(7) of the Criminal Law Act 1977. It could be altered under section 61(1) of that Act.

The prescribed sum, within the meaning of the said section 32, may be referred to in legislation as the "statutory maximum".

== Scotland ==
The prescribed sum is defined by section 225(8) of the Criminal Procedure (Scotland) Act 1995.

The prescribed sum was defined by section 289B(6) of the Criminal Procedure (Scotland) Act 1975.

The prescribed sum, within the meaning of the said section 225(8), may be referred to in legislation as the "statutory maximum".

== Northern Ireland ==
The prescribed sum is defined by article 4(8) of the Fines and Penalties (Northern Ireland) Order 1984 (S.I. 1984/703 (N.I. 3)). It can be altered under article 17 of that Order.

The prescribed sum, within the meaning of the said article 4, may be referred to in legislation as the "statutory maximum".
