= Larceny Act 1916 =

Act of the Parliament of the United Kingdom

Larceny Act 1916 (Note: Section 50.)
- Act of Parliament
- Parliament of the United Kingdom
- Long title: An Act to consolidate and simplify the Law relating to Larceny triable on Indictment and Kindred Offences.
- Citation: 6 & 7 Geo. 5. c. 50
- Territorial extent: United Kingdom

Dates
- Royal assent: 31 October 1916
- Commencement: 1 January 1917 (Note: Section 50.)
- Repealed: England and Wales: 1 January 1969; Northern Ireland: 1 August 1969; Scotland: 16 May 1975
Other legislation
Amends	Libel Act 1843; Criminal Procedure Act 1851
Amended by	Firearms and Imitation Firearms (Criminal Use) Act 1933; Law Reform (Married Women and Tortfeasors) Act 1935; Administration of Justice (Miscellaneous Provisions) Act 1938; Criminal Justice Act 1948; Police Act 1964; Criminal Law Act 1967; Theft Act 1968; Justices of the Peace Act 1968
Repealed by	England and Wales: Theft Act 1968; Northern Ireland: Theft Act (Northern Ireland) 1969; Scotland: Criminal Procedure (Scotland) Act 1975

Status: Repealed

Text of statute as originally enacted

The Larceny Act 1916 (6 & 7 Geo. 5. c. 50) was an act of the Parliament of the United Kingdom. Its purpose was to consolidate and simplify the law relating to larceny triable on indictment and to kindred offences.

The definition of larceny for the purposes of the act was "a person steals who, without the consent of the owner, fraudulently and without a claim of right made in good faith; takes and carries away anything capable of being stolen, with the intent at the time of such taking, permanently to deprive the owner thereof. Provided that a person may be guilty of stealing any such thing notwithstanding that he has lawful possession thereof, if, being a bailee or part owner thereof, he fraudulently converts the same to his own use or the use of any person other than the owner".

== Provisions ==
Section 23 provided maximum penalties for a number of offences of robbery and aggravated robbery.

Section 24 created the offence of sacrilege.

Section 25 created the offence of burglary.

Sections 29 to 31 related to blackmail.

Section 32 related to false pretences.

=== Repealed enactments ===
Section 48(1) of the act repealed 16 enactments, listed in the schedule to the act.

Citation	Short title	Description	Extent of repeal
33 Hen. 8. c.12	Offences within the Court Act 1541	—	Section thirteen.
6 & 7 Vict. c. 96	Libel Act 1843	The Libel Act, 1843.	Section three.
14 & 15 Vict. c. 100	Criminal Procedure Act 1851	The Criminal Procedure Act, 1851.	In section five, so far as it relates to Ireland, the words " stealing, " embezzling," and the words " or for obtaining by false pretences."
14 & 15 Vict. c. 100	Criminal Procedure Act 1851	The Criminal Procedure Act, 1851.	Section eighteen, from the words " and in cases " to the end of the section.
17 & 18 Vict. c. 112	Literary and Scientific Institutions Act 1854	The Literary and Scientific Institutions Act, 1854.	In section twenty-six, from "steal" to "chattels of the " institution, or."
23 & 24 Vict. c. 16	Municipal Corporation Mortgages, &c. Act 1860	The Municipal Corporation Mortgages, &c. Act, 1860.	Section seven.
24 & 25 Vict. c. 96	Larceny Act 1861	The Larceny Act, 1861.	In section one, from " the term " 'trustee'" to "bankruptcy " or insolvency " ; and from " for the purposes of this Act, " the night" to " succeeding " day."
24 & 25 Vict. c. 96	Larceny Act 1861	The Larceny Act, 1861.	Sections two to eleven, both inclusive.
24 & 25 Vict. c. 96	Larceny Act 1861	The Larceny Act, 1861.	In section eighteen, from " and " whosoever" to the end of the section.
24 & 25 Vict. c. 96	Larceny Act 1861	The Larceny Act, 1861.	In section nineteen, from "and " whosoever " to the end of the section.
24 & 25 Vict. c. 96	Larceny Act 1861	The Larceny Act, 1861.	Section twenty.
24 & 25 Vict. c. 96	Larceny Act 1861	The Larceny Act, 1861.	In section twenty-six, from the beginning of the section to " simple larceny and."
24 & 25 Vict. c. 96	Larceny Act 1861	The Larceny Act, 1861.	In section twenty - seven, the words " shall steal, or."
24 & 25 Vict. c. 96	Larceny Act 1861	The Larceny Act, 1861.	In section twenty - eight, the words " shall steal, or."
24 & 25 Vict. c. 96	Larceny Act 1861	The Larceny Act, 1861.	In section twenty-nine, the words, " steal or."
24 & 25 Vict. c. 96	Larceny Act 1861	The Larceny Act, 1861.	In section thirty, the words " shall steal or."
24 & 25 Vict. c. 96	Larceny Act 1861	The Larceny Act, 1861.	Sections thirty-one and thirty-two.
24 & 25 Vict. c. 96	Larceny Act 1861	The Larceny Act, 1861.	In section thirty - three, from " and whosoever having been " twice convicted " to the end of the section.
24 & 25 Vict. c. 96	Larceny Act 1861	The Larceny Act, 1861.	In section thirty-six, from " and " whosoever " to the end of the section.
24 & 25 Vict. c. 96	Larceny Act 1861	The Larceny Act, 1861.	Section thirty-eight.
24 & 25 Vict. c. 96	Larceny Act 1861	The Larceny Act, 1861.	Sections forty to sixty-four, both inclusive.
24 & 25 Vict. c. 96	Larceny Act 1861	The Larceny Act, 1861.	Sections sixty-seven to seventy-four, both inclusive.
24 & 25 Vict. c. 96	Larceny Act 1861	The Larceny Act, 1861.	Sections seventy-seven to eighty-one, both inclusive.
24 & 25 Vict. c. 96	Larceny Act 1861	The Larceny Act, 1861.	Sections eighty-eight to ninety-six, both inclusive.
24 & 25 Vict. c. 96	Larceny Act 1861	The Larceny Act, 1861.	In section ninety-eight, the words " except only a receiver of stolen " property."
24 & 25 Vict. c. 96	Larceny Act 1861	The Larceny Act, 1861.	Sections one hundred and One hundred and one.
24 & 25 Vict. c. 96	Larceny Act 1861	The Larceny Act, 1861.	Section one hundred and fourteen.
30 & 31 Vict. c. 35	Criminal Law Amendment Act 1867	The Criminal Law Amendment Act, 1867.	In section nine, the words "either" and the words "or " otherwise."
31 & 32 Vict. c. 116	Larceny Act 1868	The Larceny Act, 1868.	Section one.
34 & 35 Vict. c. 112	Prevention of Crimes Act 1871	The Prevention of Crimes Act, 1871.	Sections sixteen and nineteen.
39 & 40 Vict. c. 20	Statute Law Revision (Substituted Enactments) Act 1876	The Statute Law Revision (Substituted Enactments) Act, 1876.	Section three.
45 & 46 Vict. c. 50	Municipal Corporations Act 1882	The Municipal Corporations Act. 1882.	Section one hundred and seventeen.
45 & 46 Vict. c. 56	Electric Lighting Act 1882	The Electric Lighting Act, 1882.	Section twenty-three.
59 & 60 Vict. c. 52	Larceny Act 1896	The Larceny Act, 1896.	The whole act.
59 & 60 Vict. c. 57	Burglary Act 1896	The Burglary Act, 1896.	The whole act.
1 Edw. 7. c. 10	Larceny Act 1901	The Larceny Act, 1901.	The whole act.
4 & 5 Geo. 5. c. 58	Criminal Justice Administration Act 1914	The Criminal Justice Administration Act, 1914.	Section thirty-five.
4 & 5 Geo. 5. c. 58	Criminal Justice Administration Act 1914	The Criminal Justice Administration Act, 1914.	Section thirty-nine, subsection two.
4 & 5 Geo. 5. c. 58	Criminal Justice Administration Act 1914	The Criminal Justice Administration Act, 1914.	The Third Schedule.

== Subsequent developments ==
Section 38(1) of the act was repealed for England and Wales by section 10(2) of, and part II of schedule 3 to, the Criminal Law Act 1967, which came into force on 1 January 1968.

The whole act was repealed in respect of offences committed after 1 January 1969 by section 32(1)(a) of the Theft Act 1968 and the whole act was repealed for England and Wales by section 33(3) of, and part I of schedule 3 to, the Theft Act 1968, which came into force on 1 January 1969.

Section 37(5) of the act was repealed for England and Wales by section 8(2) of, and part II of schedule 5 to, the Justices of the Peace Act 1968, which came into force on 1 February 1969.

The whole act was repealed for Northern Ireland by section 32(1) of, and part I of schedule 3 to, the Theft Act (Northern Ireland) 1969.

The whole act was repealed for Scotland by section 461(2) of, and part I of schedule 10 to, the Criminal Procedure (Scotland) Act 1975, which came into force on 16 May 1975.

Larceny has been replaced by the broader offence of theft under section 1(1) of the Theft Act 1968. This offence did incorporate some of the terminology and substance of larceny.

== See also ==
- Larceny Act
