= Hybrid offence =

Class of offence in common law jurisdictions

A hybrid offence, dual offence, Crown option offence, dual procedure offence, offence triable either way, or wobbler is one of the special class offences in the common law jurisdictions where the case may be prosecuted either summarily or on indictment. In the United States, an alternative misdemeanor/felony offense (colloquially known as a wobbler) lists both county jail (misdemeanor sentence) and state prison (felony sentence) as possible punishment, for example, for theft.

== Canada ==
The power to choose under which class a hybrid offence will be tried rests with the crown counsel. Hybrid offences can either be summary offences (minor crimes) or indictable offences (major crimes). For most indictable offences, a person has the right to trial by jury.

A hybrid offence is the most common type of charge in Canada. There are three types of charges and each will affect when one can apply for a Record Suspension.

Under the Criminal Records Act, Section 2.1, the Parole Board of Canada is the administrative tribunal that has the exclusive authority to make decisions regarding Record Suspensions. A Record Suspension is a formal means to remove the disadvantages associated with having a Criminal Record for people that have been convicted of a criminal offence. In order to apply for a Record Suspension an individual must complete an application that is later reviewed by the Board and a decision to grant, or deny the application is made by an officer. Under Section 7, the Parole Board of Canada also has the ability to revoke granted Record Suspensions if there is a breach in good conduct on the part of the applicant or if a person reoffends and commits an indictable offence and even in some cases a summary offence.

== England and Wales ==
When an enactment in the United Kingdom creates an offence, it generally specifies what penalties apply on summary conviction or on conviction on indictment. In relation to England and Wales, the first expression refers to a trial in a magistrates' court without a jury before a district judge or a panel of magistrates, while the latter refers to a trial in the Crown Court by jury. Some offences allow either mode of trial, and as such the Interpretation Act 1978 defines the expression triable either way to describe an offence which, if committed by an adult, is triable either on indictment or summarily. By contrast a summary offence is one that is not defined as triable on indictment (cannot normally be tried in the Crown Court), whereas indictable offence includes an either way offence.

In some cases an offence may be triable only summarily because the amount of money at issue is small (section 22 of the Magistrates' Courts Act 1980), or an offence that can normally be tried only summarily may nonetheless be tried on indictment along with other offences that are themselves indictable (Part V of the Criminal Justice Act 1988); these circumstances do not affect whether an offence is described as summary, indictable, or either way. Offences committed by offenders under 18 are usually tried in the Youth Court, which has different procedures.

When a person is charged with an either-way offence, the decision as to which court will hear the case is determined at a Mode of Trial hearing before a magistrates' court. The court decides if the case is suitable to be heard in a magistrates' court. If they decide that the case is either too serious or too complex, or another offence is being charged which is triable only on indictment, they can send the case to the Crown Court, in which case the defendant has no say in the matter. If the magistrates decide that the case is suitable to be heard by the magistrates, then the defendant is asked for consent to do so. The defendant can then either consent to be tried summarily (though likely in a different hearing on a later date) or opt for trial by jury at the Crown Court, provided that they have pleaded not guilty. If they have pleaded guilty then they have no say in the matter – thus there is no way for a defendant to agree to plead guilty in exchange for having a case dealt with by magistrates. A defendant can, however, ask for an indication as to whether the magistrates would be minded to impose a custodial sentence were they to plead guilty at that point.

Magistrates' courts have limited powers of sentencing; for example, they may not impose a sentence of imprisonment longer than twelve months. If the defendant is tried summarily in a magistrates' court and is convicted, there may still be a committal to the Crown Court for sentencing if the magistrates think that their sentencing powers are inadequate. Thus it is not possible for a defendant to avoid the harsher sentences available in the Crown Court simply by accepting a summary trial.

A number of either-way offences have special treatment; these include:

- Shoplifting contrary to section 1 of the Theft Act 1968, where the goods stolen were valued less than £200 – the Magistrates' Court cannot send the defendant for trial to the Crown Court of its own volition, but must do so if the defendant so elects.
- Burglary contrary to section 9 of the Theft Act 1968, except where:
  - an indictable-only offence was committed, or intended to be committed during the burglary;
  - the burglary was at a dwelling and a person in the dwelling was subjected to violence or the threat of violence; or
  - the defendant has two or more previous convictions for domestic burglary.

=== History ===
The expression "hybrid offence" was applicable to an offence triable either on indictment or summarily. It was applicable to offences to which section 18 of the Magistrates' Courts Act 1952 applied.

See sections 14(c) and 64 of the Criminal Law Act 1977.

== Scotland ==
In Scots law, all common law offences other than those within the exclusive jurisdiction of the High Court of Justiciary (i.e. murder, treason, rape and breach of duty by magistrates) can be tried either summarily in the justice of the peace courts or sheriff courts, or on indictment (also referred to as solemn procedure) in the sheriff courts or the High Court of Justiciary. For statutory offences, the statute will provide whether the offence is triable summarily, on indictment, or both.

The choice of forum is a matter for the Lord Advocate and procurator fiscal, and is determined in a process known as marking.

== United States ==
In U.S. states in which these offenses occur, the prosecuting attorney has discretion in deciding which category to charge the defendant. Prosecutors may strategically file such offenses as felonies, agreeing to refile the charge as a misdemeanor should the defendant consent to a guilty plea.

After hearing evidence at a preliminary hearing, the judge or magistrate has discretion to reduce a felony wobbler to a misdemeanor charge; the opposite is not permitted.

In juvenile court, after a minor is declared to be delinquent following a bench trial or open plea, the judge may classify a wobbler felony as a misdemeanor instead.

=== California ===
In California, one example of a wobbler offense is grand theft (PC487). In this case, the judge has the power to reduce a felony charge of this type to a misdemeanor during various stages of the proceeding, including the preliminary hearing all the way until after a defendant completes probation.
