= Malicious Damage Act 1861 =

Act of the Parliament of the United Kingdom

Malicious Damage Act 1861 (Note: The citation of this act by this short title was authorised by section 1 of, and the first schedule to, the Short Titles Act 1896. Due to the repeal of those provisions it is now authorised by section 19(2) of the Interpretation Act 1978.)
- Act of Parliament
- Parliament of the United Kingdom
- Long title: An Act to consolidate and amend the Statute Law of England and Ireland relating to Malicious Injuries to Property.
- Citation: 24 & 25 Vict. c. 97
- Territorial extent: England and Wales; Ireland; (Note: Section 78.)

Dates
- Royal assent: 6 August 1861
- Commencement: 1 November 1861 (Note: Section 79.)
Other legislation
Amends	Prevention of Offences Act 1851
Amended by	Summary Jurisdiction Act 1884; Public Authorities Protection Act 1893; Costs in Criminal Cases Act 1908; Indictments Act 1915; Criminal Justice Act 1948; Criminal Law Act 1967; Justices of the Peace Act 1968; Criminal Damage Act 1971; Courts Act 1971; Statute Law (Repeals) Act 1976; Merchant Shipping (Registration, etc.) Act 1993
Relates to	Offences Against the Person Act 1861

Status: Partially repealed

Text of statute as originally enacted

Text of the Malicious Damage Act 1861 as in force today (including any amendments) within the United Kingdom, from legislation.gov.uk.

The Malicious Damage Act 1861 (24 & 25 Vict. c. 97) is an act of the Parliament of the United Kingdom that consolidated provisions related to malicious damage from a number of earlier statutes into a single act. For the most part these provisions were, according to the draftsman of the act, incorporated with little or no variation in their phraseology. It is one of a group of acts sometimes referred to as the Criminal Law Consolidation Acts 1861. It was passed with the object of simplifying the law. It is essentially a revised version of an earlier consolidation act, the Malicious Injuries to Property Act 1827 (7 & 8 Geo 4 c 30) (and the equivalent Irish Act), incorporating subsequent statutes.

The act applied in the Republic of Ireland until 1991 and still applies in some Commonwealth countries which were parts of the British Empire in 1861, such as Sierra Leone.

== Injuries by fire to buildings, and goods therein ==
The following words were repealed for England and Wales by section 83(3) of, and Part I of Schedule 10 to, the Criminal Justice Act 1948:

- In sections 1 to 10, 14 to 21, 23, 26 to 33, 42 to 48 and 50, the words "and, if a male under the age of sixteen years, with or without whipping" wherever those words occurred
- In sections 22 and 54, the words from "with or without hard labour" to the end
- In section 39, the words from "with or without hard labour" to "whipping"

Sections 1 to 7 were repealed for England and Wales by section 11(8) of, and Part I of the Schedule to, the Criminal Damage Act 1971. They were repealed for Northern Ireland by the Criminal Damage (Northern Ireland) Order 1977 (S.I. 1977/426) (N.I. 4)

- Section 1: Setting fire to a church or chapel
- Section 2: Setting fire to a dwelling house, any person being therein
- Section 3: Setting fire to a house, outhouse, manufactory, farm building, etc.

=== Indictments of ss. 2 & 3 ===
The following specimen counts were formerly contained in paragraph 14 of the Second Schedule to the Indictments Act 1915 before it was repealed.

STATEMENT OF OFFENCE.

First Count.

Arson, contrary to section 2 of the Malicious Damage Act, 1861.

PARTICULARS OF OFFENCE.

A.B., on the day of , in the county of , maliciously set fire to a dwelling-house, one F.G. being therein.

STATEMENT OF OFFENCE.

Second Count.

Arson, contrary to section 3 of the Malicious Damage Act, 1861.

PARTICULARS OF OFFENCE.

A.B., on the day of , in the county of , maliciously set fire to a house with intent to injure or defraud.

The following specimen count was formerly contained in paragraph 15 of the Second Schedule to the Indictments Act 1915 before it was repealed.

STATEMENT OF OFFENCES.

A.B., arson, contrary to section 3 of the Malicious Damage Act, 1861;

C.D., accessory before the fact to same offence.

PARTICULARS OF OFFENCES.

A.B., on the day of , in the county of , set fire to a house with intent to injure or defraud.

C.D., on the same day, in the county of , did counsel, procure, and command the said A.B. to commit the said offence.

- Section 4: Setting fire to any Railway Station
- Section 5: Setting fire to any Public Building
- Section 6: Setting fire to other Buildings
- Section 7: Setting fire to Goods in any Building the setting fire to which is Felony

Section 8: Attempting to set fire to Buildings

This section was repealed for England and Wales by section 10(2) of and Part III of Schedule 3 to, the Criminal Law Act 1967. It was repealed for Northern Ireland by the Criminal Damage (Northern Ireland) Order 1977

== Injuries by explosive substances to buildings and goods therein ==
Sections 9 to 26 were repealed for England and Wales by section 11(8) of, and Part I of the Schedule to, the Criminal Damage Act 1971. They were repealed for Northern Ireland by the Criminal Damage (Northern Ireland) Order 1977 (S.I. 1977/426) (N.I. 4)

- Section 9: Destroying or damaging a House with Gunpowder, any Person being therein
- Section 10: Attempting to destroy Buildings with Gunpowder

== Injuries to buildings by rioters, etc. ==
- Section 11: Rioters demolishing Church, Building, &c.

Section 12: Rioters injuring Building, Machinery, &c.

The proviso to this section was repealed for England and Wales by section 10(2) of and Part III of Schedule 3 to, the Criminal Law Act 1967.

== Injuries to buildings by tenants ==
- Section 13: Tenants of Houses, &c. maliciously injuring them

== Injuries to manufactures, machinery, etc. ==
- Section 14: Destroying Goods in Process of Manufacture, certain Machinery, &c.
- Section 15: Destroying Machines in, other Manufactures, Threshing Machines, &c.

== Injuries to corn, trees and vegetable productions ==
- Section 16: Setting fire to Crops of Corn, &c.
- Section 17: Setting fire to Stacks of Corn, &c.
- Section 18: Attempting to set fire to any Crops of Corn, &c. or to any Stack or Steer
- Section 19: Destroying Hopbinds
- Section 20: Destroying or damaging Trees, Shrubs, &c. to the Value of more than 1l. growing in a Pleasure Ground, &c.
- Section 21: Destroying or damaging Trees, Shrubs, &c. to the Value of more than 5l. growing elsewhere than in a Pleasure Ground, &c.

=== Section 22: Damaging Trees, wheresoever growing, to the Amount of 1s ===
This section has been repealed for England and Wales and Northern Ireland. As originally enacted this section read:

Whosoever shall unlawfully and maliciously cut, break, bark, root up, or otherwise destroy or damage the whole or any Part of any Tree, Sapling, or Shrub, or any Underwood, wheresoever the same may be growing, the Injury done being to the Amount of One Shilling at the least, shall, on Conviction thereof before a Justice of the Peace, at the Discretion of the Justice, either be committed to the Common Gaol or House of Correction, there to be imprisoned only, or to be imprisoned and kept to Hard Labour for any Term not exceeding Three Months, or else shall forfeit and pay, over and above the Amount of the Injury done, such Sum of Money, not exceeding Five Pounds, as to the Justice shall seem meet; and whosoever, having been convicted of any such Offence, either against this or any former Act of Parliament, shall afterwards commit any of the said Offences in this Section before mentioned, and shall be convicted thereof in like Manner, shall for such Second Offence be committed to the Common Gaol or House of Correction, there to be kept to Hard Labour for such Term, not exceeding Twelve Months, as the convicting Justice shall think fit; and whosoever, having been twice convicted of any such Offence (whether both or either of such Convictions shall have taken place before or after the passing of this Act), shall afterwards commit any of the said Offences in this Section before mentioned, shall be guilty of a Misdemeanor, and being convicted thereof shall be liable, at the Discretion of the Court, to be imprisoned for any Term not exceeding Two Years, with or without Hard Labour, and with or without Solitary Confinement, and, if a Male Age of Sixteen Years or younger, with or without hard work

Indictment

The following specimen count was formerly contained in paragraph 17 of the Second Schedule to the Indictments Act 1915 before it was repealed.

STATEMENT OF OFFENCE.

Damaging trees, contrary to section 22 of the Malicious Damage Act, 1861.

PARTICULARS OF OFFENCE.

A.B., on the day of , in the county of , maliciously damaged an oak tree there growing.

A.B. has been twice previously convicted of an offence under section 22 of the Malicious Damage Act, 1861, namely, at , on the day of , and at , on the day of .

- Section 23: Destroying any Fruit or vegetable Production in a Garden
- Section 24: Destroying &c. vegetable Productions not growing in Gardens, &c.

== Injuries to fences ==
- Section 25: Destroying, &c. any Fence, Wall, Stile, or Gate

== Injuries to mines ==
- Section 26: Setting fire to a Coal Mine

Section 27: Attempting to set fire to a Mine

This section was repealed for England and Wales by section 10(2) of and Part III of Schedule 3 to, the Criminal Law Act 1967. It was repealed for Northern Ireland by the Criminal Damage (Northern Ireland) Order 1977

Sections 28 and 29 were repealed for England and Wales by sections 11(3) and (8) of, and Part I of the Schedule to, the Criminal Damage Act 1971. They were repealed for Northern Ireland by the Criminal Damage (Northern Ireland) Order 1977 (S.I. 1977/426) (N.I. 4)

- Section 28: Conveying Water into a Mine, obstructing the Shaft, &c.
- Section 29: Damaging Steam Engines, Staiths, Waggon ways, &c. for working Mines

== Injuries to sea and river banks, and to works on rivers, canals, etc. ==
Sections 30 to 34 were repealed for England and Wales by section 11(8) of, and Part I of the Schedule to, the Criminal Damage Act 1971. They were repealed for Northern Ireland by the Criminal Damage (Northern Ireland) Order 1977 (S.I. 1977/426) (N.I. 4)

- Section 30: Destroy any Sea Bank, or Wall on any Canal
- Section 31: Removing the Piles of any Sea Bank, &c., or doing any Damage to obstruct the Navigation of a River or Canal

== Injuries to ponds ==
- Section 32: Breaking down the Dam of a Fishery, &c. or Milldam, or poisoning Fish

== Injuries to bridges, viaducts and toll bars ==
- Section 33: Injury to a public Bridge
- Section 34: Destroying a Turnpike Gate, Toll House, &c.

== Injuries to railway carriages and telegraphs ==
=== Section 35 - Placing wood, &c. on railway, with intent to obstruct or overthrow any engine, &c. ===
This section creates an offence in England and Wales and Northern Ireland. It has been repealed for the Republic of Ireland.

It replaces section 6 of the Prevention of Offences Act 1851 (14 & 15 Vict. c.19) in so far as that section related to malicious injuries to property.

It has the following form in England and Wales:

Whosoever shall unlawfully and maliciously cut, place, cast, or throw upon or across any railway any wood, stone, or other matter or thing, or shall unlawfully and maliciously take up, remove, or displace any rail, sleeper, or other matter or thing belonging to any railway, or shall unlawfully and maliciously turn, move, or divert any points or other machinery belonging to any railway, or shall unlawfully and maliciously make or show, hide or remove, any signal or light upon or near to any railway, or shall unlawfully and maliciously do or cause to be done any other matter or thing, with intent, in any of the cases aforesaid, to obstruct, upset, overthrow, injure, or destroy any engine, tender, carriage, or truck using such railway, shall be guilty of felony, and being convicted thereof shall be liable, at the discretion of the court, to be kept in penal servitude for life . . . or to be imprisoned . . .

The words in the first place were repealed by the Statute Law Revision Act 1892. The words "and, if a male under the age of sixteen years, with or without whipping" at the end were repealed by section 83(3) of, and Part I of Schedule 10 to, the Criminal Justice Act 1948.

This section was repealed in part for Northern Ireland by the Statute Law Revision Act (Northern Ireland) 1954.

"Maliciously"

See section 58.

"Felony"

See the Criminal Law Act 1967, the Criminal Law Act (Northern Ireland) 1967 and the Criminal Law Act, 1997.

"Penal servitude"

See the Criminal Justice Act 1948, section 1(1) and the Criminal Justice Act (Northern Ireland) 1953, section 1(1)

Mode of trial

In England and Wales, the offence under section 35 is an indictable-only offence.

Sentence

In England and Wales, an offence under section 35 is punishable with imprisonment for life or for any shorter term.

See the Crown Prosecution Service Sentencing Manual.

In Northern Ireland, an offence under section 35 is punishable with imprisonment for life or for any shorter term.

Early release of prisoners

An offence under this section is an excluded offence for the purposes of section 32 of the Criminal Justice Act 1982.

Jurisdiction in Northern Ireland over offences committed in the Republic of Ireland

An offence under this section is an extraterritorial offence for the purposes of the Criminal Jurisdiction Act 1975.

Former jurisdiction in the Republic of Ireland over offences committed in the Northern Ireland

Offences under this section were specified for the purposes of section 2(1) of the Criminal Law (Jurisdiction) Act, 1976

Visiting Forces

In England and Wales and Northern Ireland, an offence under this section is an offence against property for the purposes of section 3 of the Visiting Forces Act 1952.

Terrorism

An offence under this section is a scheduled offence for the purposes of Part VII of the Terrorism Act 2000.

=== Section 36 - Obstructing engines or carriages on railways ===
This section creates an offence in England and Wales, Northern Ireland and the Republic of Ireland.

It replaces section 15 of the Railway Regulation Act 1840 (3 & 4 Vict c 97) in so far as that section related to malicious injuries to property.

This section is similar to section 35, but requires no proof of specific intent. The maximum penalty is two years imprisonment. The main difference between these two provisions is the mens rea, a specific intent being regarded as more culpable than recklessness or negligence.

Whosoever, by any unlawful act, or by any wilful omission or neglect, shall obstruct or cause to be obstructed any engine or carriage using any railway, or shall aid or assist therein, shall be guilty of a misdemeanor, and being convicted thereof shall be liable, at the discretion of the court, to be imprisoned for any term not exceeding two years, . . .

"Maliciously"

See section 58.

"Misdemeanour"

See the Criminal Law Act 1967, the Criminal Law Act (Northern Ireland) 1967 and the Criminal Law Act, 1997

Mode of trial

In England and Wales, this offence is triable either way.

Sentence

In England and Wales, a person guilty of an offence under section 36 is liable, on conviction on indictment, to imprisonment for a term not exceeding two years, or on summary conviction to imprisonment for a term not exceeding six months, or to a fine not exceeding the prescribed sum, or to both.

See the Crown Prosecution Service Sentencing Manual.

In Northern Ireland, a person guilty of an offence under section 36 is liable, on conviction on indictment, to imprisonment for a term not exceeding two years, or on summary conviction to imprisonment for a term not exceeding twelve months, or to a fine not exceeding the prescribed sum, or to both.

Visiting Forces

In England and Wales and Northern Ireland, an offence under this section is an offence against property for the purposes of section 3 of the Visiting Forces Act 1952.

=== Indictments of ss. 35 & 36 ===
The following specimen counts were formerly contained in paragraph 16 of the Second Schedule to the Indictments Act 1915 before it was repealed.

STATEMENT OF OFFENCE.

First Count.

Offence under section 35 of the Malicious Damage Act, 1861.

PARTICULARS OF OFFENCE.

A.B., on the day of , in the county of , displaced a sleeper belonging to the Great Western Railway with intent to obstruct, upset, overthrow, injure, or destroy any engine, tender, carriage or truck using the said railway.

STATEMENT OF OFFENCE.

Second Count.

Obstructing railway, contrary to section 36 of the Malicious Damage Act, 1861.

PARTICULARS OF OFFENCE.

A.B., on the day of , in the county of , by unlawfully displacing a sleeper belonging to the Great Western Railway did obstruct or cause to be obstructed an engine or carriage using the said railway.

A book has suggested that these forms could safely be used as precedents despite their repeal. (Note: It is not necessary to specify the place where the offence allegedly took place unless it is material to the charge.)

Sections 37 to 42 were repealed for England and Wales by section 11(8) of, and Part I of the Schedule to, the Criminal Damage Act 1971. They were repealed for Northern Ireland by the Criminal Damage (Northern Ireland) Order 1977 (S.I. 1977/426) (N.I. 4)

- Section 37: Injuries to Electric or Magnetic Telegraphs
- Section 38: Attempt to Injure such Telegraphs

== Injuries to works of art ==
Section 39: Destroying or damaging Works of Art in Museums, Churches, &c., or in Public Places

== Injuries to cattle and other animals ==
- Section 40: Killing or maiming Cattle
- Section 41: Killing or maiming other Animals

== Injuries to ships ==
The heading "injuries to ships" was included in the Bill, but omitted from the Act as printed. It is thought that this was a mistake.

- Section 42: Setting fire to a Ship

Section 43: Setting fire to Ships to prejudice the Owner or Underwriters

Section 43 of the act was repealed for England and Wales by section 10(2) of, and part I of schedule 3 to, the Criminal Law Act 1967, which came into force on 1 January 1968.

Section 43 of the act was repealed for Northern Ireland by the Criminal Damage (Northern Ireland) Order 1977.

Section 44: Attempting to set fire to a Vessel

This section was repealed for England and Wales by section 10(2) of and Part III of Schedule 3 to, the Criminal Law Act 1967. It was repealed for Northern Ireland by the Criminal Damage (Northern Ireland) Order 1977.

Sections 45 and 46 were repealed for England and Wales by section 11(8) of, and Part I of the Schedule to, the Criminal Damage Act 1971. They were repealed for Northern Ireland by the Criminal Damage (Northern Ireland) Order 1977 (S.I. 1977/426) (N.I. 4)

- Section 45: Placing Gunpowder near a Vessel with Intent to damage it
- Section 46: Damaging Ships otherwise than by Fire

Sections 47 and 48 were repealed by sections 8(3) and (4) of, and paragraph 35 of Schedule 4 to, and Part II of Schedule 5 to, the Merchant Shipping (Registration, etc) Act 1993

- Section 47: Exhibiting false Signals, &c.
- Section 48: Removing or concealing Buoys and other Sea Marks

Sections 49 to 51 were repealed for England and Wales by section 11(8) of, and Part I of the Schedule to, the Criminal Damage Act 1971. They were repealed for Northern Ireland by the Criminal Damage (Northern Ireland) Order 1977 (S.I. 1977/426) (N.I. 4)

- Section 49: Destroying Wrecks or any Articles belonging thereto

== Sending letters threatening to burn or destroy ==
- Section 50: Sending Letters threatening to burn or destroy Houses, Buildings, Ships, &c.

== Injuries not before provided for ==
- Section 51: Person committing malicious Injuries not before provided for exceeding the Amount of 5l

Sections 52 and 53 were repealed for by section 44 of, and Schedule 4 to, the Criminal Justice Administration Act 1914. They were repealed for Northern Ireland by the Criminal Damage (Northern Ireland) Order 1977 (S.I. 1977/426) (N.I. 4)

- Section 52: Persons committing Damage to any Property, in any Case not previously provided for, may be committed or fined and compelled by a Justice to pay Compensation not exceeding 5l
- Section 53: Preceding Section to extend to Trees

== Making gunpowder to commit offences, and searching for the same ==
Sections 54 and 55 were repealed for England and Wales by section 11(8) of, and Part I of the Schedule to, the Criminal Damage Act 1971. They were repealed for Northern Ireland by the Criminal Damage (Northern Ireland) Order 1977 (S.I. 1977/426) (N.I. 4).

- Section 54: Making or having Gunpowder, &c. with Intent to commit any Felony against this Act
- Section 55: Justices may issue Warrants for searching Houses, &c. for such Gunpowder, &c.

== Other matters ==
Sections 56 and 57 were repealed for England and Wales by section 10(2) of and Part III of Schedule 3 to, the Criminal Law Act 1967. They were repealed for Northern Ireland by the Criminal Damage (Northern Ireland) Order 1977.

- Section 56: Principals in the Second Degree and Accessories
- Section 57: A Person loitering at Night and suspected of any Felony against this Act may be apprehended

Section 58 – Malice against owner of property unnecessary

This section provides that it is not necessary to prove malice against the owner of the damaged property.

Sections 59 to 61 were repealed for England and Wales by section 11(8) of, and Part I of the Schedule to, the Criminal Damage Act 1971. They were repealed for Northern Ireland by the Criminal Damage (Northern Ireland) Order 1977 (S.I. 1977/426) (N.I. 4).

- Section 59: Provisions of this Act shall apply to Persons in possession of the Property injured
- Section 60: Intent to injure or defraud particular Persons need not be stated in any Indictment
- Section 61: Persons in the Act of committing any Offence may be apprehended without a Warrant

Section 62: Mode of compelling the Appearance of Persons punishable on summary Conviction

This section was repealed by section 4 of, and the Schedule to, the Summary Jurisdiction Act 1884. It was repealed for Northern Ireland by the Criminal Damage (Northern Ireland) Order 1977.

Sections 63 to 65 were repealed for England and Wales by section 11(8) of, and Part I of the Schedule to, the Criminal Damage Act 1971. They were repealed for Northern Ireland by the Criminal Damage (Northern Ireland) Order 1977 (S.I. 1977/426) (N.I. 4).

- Section 63: Abettors in Offences punishable on summary Conviction
- Section 64: Application of Forfeitures and Penalties upon summary Convictions
- Section 65: If a Person summarily convicted shall not pay, &c., the Justice may commit him

Section 66: The Justice may discharge the Offender in certain Cases

This section was repealed for England and Wales by section 83(3) of, and Part I of Schedule 10 to, the Criminal Justice Act 1948. It was repealed for Northern Ireland by the Criminal Damage (Northern Ireland) Order 1977.

Section 67: A summary Conviction shall be a Bar to any other Proceeding for the same Cause

This section were repealed for England and Wales by section 11(8) of, and Part I of the Schedule to, the Criminal Damage Act 1971. It was repealed for Northern Ireland by the Criminal Damage (Northern Ireland) Order 1977 (S.I. 1977/426) (N.I. 4).

Section 68: Appeal

This section was repealed by section 56(4) of, and Part IV of Schedule 11 to, the Courts Act 1971. It was repealed for Northern Ireland by the Criminal Damage (Northern Ireland) Order 1977.

Section 69: No Certiorari, &c. It was repealed for Northern Ireland by the Criminal Damage (Northern Ireland) Order 1977.

Section 70: Convictions to be returned to the Quarter Sessions

This section was repealed by section 4 of, and the Schedule to, the Summary Jurisdiction Act 1884. It was repealed for Northern Ireland by the Criminal Damage (Northern Ireland) Order 1977.

Section 71: Venue in Proceedings against Persons acting under this Act

It was repealed for Northern Ireland by the Criminal Damage (Northern Ireland) Order 1977.

Section 72 - Offences committed within the jurisdiction of the Admiralty

This section deals with jurisdiction and essentially duplicates the Offences at Sea Act 1799, and although still in force, is obsolete. The provision dealt mainly with piracy and extended the jurisdiction of British courts to crimes committed by British subjects on the high seas.

The words " deemed to be offences of the same nature and", and the words from " and may be dealt with " to the end, were repealed for England and Wales by section 10(2) of and Part III of Schedule 3 to, the Criminal Law Act 1967.

Section 73: Fine and Sureties for keeping the Peace; in what Cases

The words " fine the offender, and," and the words from "and in case of any felony " to " authorized ", where next occurring, were repealed for England and Wales by section 10(2) of and Part III of Schedule 3 to, the Criminal Law Act 1967.

Section 73 of the act was repealed for England and Wales by section 8(2) of, and part II of schedule 5 to, the Justices of the Peace Act 1968, which came into force on 1 February 1969.

It was repealed for Northern Ireland by the Criminal Damage (Northern Ireland) Order 1977.

Section 74: Hard Labour

This section was repealed by the Statute Law Revision Act 1892. It was repealed for Northern Ireland by the Criminal Damage (Northern Ireland) Order 1977.

Section 75: Solitary Confinement and Whipping

This section was repealed for England and Wales by section 83(3) of, and Part I of Schedule 10 to, the Criminal Justice Act 1948. It was repealed for Northern Ireland by the Criminal Damage (Northern Ireland) Order 1977.

Section 76: Summary Proceedings in England may be under the 11 & 12 Vict. c. 43., and in Ireland under the 14 & 15 Vict. c. 93

This section was repealed for England and Wales by section 11(8) of, and Part I of the Schedule to, the Criminal Damage Act 1971. It was repealed for Northern Ireland by the Criminal Damage (Northern Ireland) Order 1977 (S.I. 1977/426) (N.I. 4).

Section 77: The Costs of the Prosecution of Misdemeanors against this Act may be allowed

This section was repealed by section 10(1) of, and the Schedule to, the Costs in Criminal Cases Act 1908. It was repealed for Northern Ireland by the Criminal Damage (Northern Ireland) Order 1977.

Section 78: Act not to extend to Scotland

This section was repealed for England and Wales by section 11(8) of, and Part I of the Schedule to, the Criminal Damage Act 1971. It was repealed for Northern Ireland by the Criminal Damage (Northern Ireland) Order 1977 (S.I. 1977/426) (N.I. 4).

Section 79: Commencement of Act

This section was repealed by the Statute Law Revision Act 1892. It was repealed for Northern Ireland by the Criminal Damage (Northern Ireland) Order 1977.

== Subsequent developments ==
Section 71 of the act was repealed by section 2 of, and the schedule to, the Public Authorities Protection Act 1893 (56 & 57 Vict. c. 61), which came into force on 1 January 1894.

Section 69 of the act was repealed by section 1(1) of, and part XIX of schedule 1 to, the Statute Law (Repeals) Act 1976, which came into force on 27 May 1976.

== See also ==
- Criminal damage in English law

== Bibliography ==
- James Edward Davis, The Criminal Law Consolidation Statutes of the 24 & 25 of Victoria, Chapters 94 to 100: Edited with Notes, Critical and Explanatory, Butterworths, 1861, pp. v - xviii (introduction) The Criminal Law Consolidation Statutes of the 24 & 25 of Victoria: Chapters 94 to 100 and pp. 118 to 170 (complete annotated text of the Act) The Criminal Law Consolidation Statutes of the 24 & 25 of Victoria: Chapters 94 to 100 (from Google Books).
