= Offences Against the Person Act 1861 =

Act of the Parliament of the United Kingdom

Offences against the Person Act 1861 (Note: The citation of this act by this short title was authorised by section 1 of, and the first schedule to, the Short Titles Act 1896. Due to the repeal of those provisions it is now authorised by section 19(2) of the Interpretation Act 1978. It is written as it appears in the text of that act published in the Public General Acts 1896, HMSO, notwithstanding that the "a" in "against" is sometimes capitalised in other sources.)
- Act of Parliament
- Parliament of the United Kingdom
- Long title: An Act to consolidate and amend the Statute Law of England and Ireland relating to Offences against the Person.
- Citation: 24 & 25 Vict. c. 100
- Territorial extent: England and Wales; Ireland; (Note: Section 78.)

Dates
- Royal assent: 6 August 1861
- Commencement: 1 November 1861 (Note: Section 79.)
Other legislation
| Amends | Prevention of Offences Act 1851 |
| Amended by | Criminal Law Amendment Act 1871; Offences Against the Person Act 1875; Criminal Law Amendment Act 1885; Costs in Criminal Cases Act 1908; Indictments Act 1915; Infant Life (Preservation) Act 1929; National Assistance Act 1948; Criminal Justice Act 1948; Statute Law Revision Act 1953; Sexual Offences Act 1956; Police Act 1964; Murder (Abolition of Death Penalty) Act 1965; Homicide Act 1957; Criminal Law Act 1967; Justices of the Peace Act 1968; Northern Ireland (Emergency Provisions) Act 1973; Statute Law (Repeals) Act 1976; Child Abduction Act 1984; Statute Law (Repeals) Act 1989; Criminal Procedure and Investigations Act 1996; Courts Act 2003; Sexual Offences Act 2003; Criminal Justice (No. 2) (Northern Ireland) Order 2004; Sexual Offences (Northern Ireland) Order 2008; Justice Act (Northern Ireland) 2011; Northern Ireland (Executive Formation etc) Act 2019; Crime and Policing Act 2026 |

Status: Amended

Text of statute as originally enacted

Revised text of statute as amended

Text of the Offences Against the Person Act 1861 as in force today (including any amendments) within the United Kingdom, from legislation.gov.uk.

The Offences Against the Person Act 1861 (24 & 25 Vict. c. 100) is an act of the Parliament of the United Kingdom that consolidated provisions related to offences against the person (an expression which, in particular, includes offences of violence) from a number of earlier statutes into a single act. In its original form, it addressed homicide (Note: Sections 1 through 10.), attempted murder (Note: Sections 11 through 15.), threats to commit murder (Note: Section 16.), bodily injury (Note: Sections 17 through 35.), assaults (Note: Sections 36 through 47.), sexual offences and abduction (Note: Sections 48 through 56), bigamy (Note: Section 57), abortion and concealment of childbirths (Note: Sections 58 through 60), the criminalization of homosexuality and bestiality (Note: Sections 61 through 63), and ancillary provisions (Note: Sections 64 through 79). It did not extend to Scotland. (Note: Section 78)

For the most part these provisions were, according to the draftsman of the act, incorporated with little or no variation in their phraseology. It is one of a group of acts sometimes referred to as the Criminal Law Consolidation Acts 1861. It was passed with the object of simplifying the law. It is essentially a revised version of an earlier consolidation act, the Offences Against the Person Act 1828 (9 Geo. 4. c. 31) (and the equivalent Irish Act), incorporating subsequent statutes. It also abolished the death penalty for many offences.

Although it has been substantially amended, it continues to be the foundation for prosecuting personal injury, short of murder, in the courts of England and Wales. The act was also adopted in British possessions and across colonial territories. For example, New Zealand adopted the act in 1866, while Hong Kong incorporated the act as an ordinance in 1865. It additionally continues to remain partly in force in the Republic of Ireland. Derivative legislation based on its provisions continues to exist in numerous parts of the world.

In England and Wales, and in Northern Ireland, the sexual offences under the act have all been repealed. For legislation referring to sexual offences, see the Sexual Offences Act 1956, the Sexual Offences Act 2003 and the Sexual Offences (Northern Ireland) Order 2008. In Northern Ireland, the 1861 act was the basis for a ban on abortion until 2019 when it was amended by the Northern Ireland (Executive Formation etc) Act 2019.

In June 2025, the UK Parliament voted to end prosecution for women who self-manage abortions. The amendment, led by the Labour MP Tonia Antoniazzi, removed criminal penalties under the act, ensuring women would no longer face legal action. Those provisions were later implemented in the Crime and Policing Act 2026.

== Commentary ==
The act as originally drafted listed specific methods whereby harm might be caused. For example, section 18 of the act originally included an offence of shooting which could be committed with any of the specified intents. Sections 11 to 15 of the act specified various means by which a person might attempt to commit murder.

In some cases, these reflected political issues then of great significance. For example, the Fenians were promoting their political case by leaving barrels of explosives in public places. Hence, sections 28 to 30 and 64 of the act specifically address the problem, whether injury results or not. Similarly, children were throwing stones at passing railway trains, and these provisions remain in force.

As originally enacted, the act had 79 sections.

In England and Wales, 37 sections remain in force, namely sections 4, 5, 9, 10, 16 to 18, 20 to 38, 44, 45, 47, 57 to 60, 64, 65, 68 and 78. Of those, only sections 25, 34 to 36 and 78 have not been either partially repealed or otherwise amended. Different subsets of its provisions remain in force in Northern Ireland.

In Ireland, as of 12 December 2023, sections 4, 5, 9, 10, 48, 57, 60 to 63, and 68 remain in force, of which only section 63 is unamended. Many repeals were under the Non-Fatal Offences Against the Person Act 1997 (a consolidation act) or the Criminal Law Act 1997 (which abolished penal servitude and the felony–misdemeanour distinction).

== Dangerous offenders ==
See the Criminal Justice Act 2003 for further provisions about sentencing for manslaughter and for offences under sections 4 and 16 to 47 of this act.

== Homicide ==
=== Sections 1 to 3 – Murder ===
Sections 1 to 3 dealt with the death penalty for murder and have been repealed. Section 1 was repealed by the Murder (Abolition of Death Penalty) Act 1965, while sections 2 and 3 were repealed by the Homicide Act 1957.

In the Republic of Ireland, the references to murder in these sections were changed to references to capital murder by section 15 of the Criminal Justice Act 1964. They were repealed by section 9(1) of, and the second schedule to, the Criminal Justice Act 1990. But the repeal of section 1 did not affect the operation of sections 64 to 68.(s.9(2))

==== Section 1 – Penalty for murder ====
Section 1 of the act replaced the corresponding provision in section 3 of the Offences Against the Person Act 1828 (9 Geo. 4. c. 31) and section 4 of the corresponding Irish act, the Offences Against the Person (Ireland) Act 1829 (10 Geo. 4. c. 34).

==== Section 3 – Disposal of body ====
This section provided that the body of every person executed for murder was to be buried within the precincts of the last prison in which he had been confined, and that his sentence was to direct that this should happen. It replaced the corresponding provision in section 16 of the Anatomy Act 1832 (2 & 3 Will. 4. c. 75) (as amended by section 1 of the next mentioned act) and replaced section 2 of the Hanging in Chains Act 1834 (4 & 5 Will. 4. c. 26).

=== Section 4 ===
The penalty for offences under this section was increased by article 5(1) of the Criminal Law (Amendment) (Northern Ireland) Order 1977 (SI 1977/1249) but not in relation to offences "committed before the commencement" of that order (art.5(3)).

==== Soliciting to murder ====
Section 4 of the act creates the offence of soliciting to murder.

==== Conspiracy to murder ====
Section 4 of the act creates the offence of conspiracy to murder in Northern Ireland.

The repeal of as much of this section as related to the offence of conspiracy to murder for England and Wales was consequential on the codification of conspiracy by part I of the Criminal Law Act 1977. The effect of this section, in relation to conspiracy to commit murder abroad, was preserved by section 1(4) of that act.

The repeal of as much of this section as related to the offence of conspiracy to murder for Northern Ireland was consequential on the codification of conspiracy by part IV of the Criminal Attempts and Conspiracy (Northern Ireland) Order 1983 (SI 1983/1120).

=== Section 5 – Manslaughter ===
Section 5 of the act now provides that a person convicted of manslaughter in English law is liable to imprisonment for life or for any shorter term.

In England and Wales it now reads:

Whosoever shall be convicted of manslaughter shall be liable, at the discretion of the court, to be kept in penal servitude for life ...

==== Repeals ====
The words "or to pay" to the end were repealed by Part I of Tenth Schedule to the Criminal Justice Act 1948. The other words were repealed by the Statute Law Revision Act 1892.

==== "Penal servitude for life" ====
This means imprisonment for life: See section 1(2) of the Criminal Justice Act 1948 and section 1(2) of the Criminal Justice Act (Northern Ireland) 1953 and section 11(2) of the Criminal Law Act 1997.

=== Other matters ===
Sections 6 to 8 have been repealed. They respectively dealt with the form of the indictment for murder and manslaughter, with excusable homicide and with petty treason. Section 6 was repealed by the Indictments Act 1915, while sections 7 and 8 were repealed by the Criminal Law Act 1967.

Section 6 replaced section 4 of the Criminal Procedure Act 1851 (14 & 15 Vict. c. 100). This section was repealed for the Republic of Ireland on 22 August 1924.

Section 7 replaced section 10 of the Offences Against the Person Act 1828 (9 Geo. 4. c. 31).

Section 8 replaced section 2 of the Offences Against the Person Act 1828 (9 Geo. 4. c. 31).

Sections 7 and 8 of the act act were repealed for England and Wales by section 10(2) of, and part I of schedule 3 to, the Criminal Law Act 1967, which came into force on 1 January 1968.

=== Sections 9 and 10: Jurisdiction over murder or manslaughter abroad ===
Section 9 gives the courts in England, Wales and Ireland extra-territorial jurisdiction over homicides committed by British subjects overseas. At the time of passing this was a more expansive definition, including the Dominions, but was restricted to just British subjects linked to the United Kingdom and its colonies by section 3 of the British Nationality Act 1948.) Section 10 gives these courts jurisdiction over fatal acts committed by British subjects overseas where the death occurs in England, Wales or Ireland, and jurisdiction over fatal acts committed in England, Wales or Ireland by anyone, including aliens, where the death occurs abroad. (The word "criminally" in that section has been held to exclude fatal acts done by aliens overseas although the death occurs in England, Wales or Ireland, since such acts are not punishable under the criminal law.)

9. Where any murder or manslaughter shall be committed on land out of the United Kingdom, whether within the Queen's dominions or without, and whether the person killed were a subject of Her Majesty or not, every offence committed by any subject of Her Majesty in respect of any such case, whether the same shall amount to the offence of murder or of manslaughter, ... may be dealt with, inquired of, tried, determined, and punished ... in England or Ireland; Provided, that nothing herein contained shall prevent any person from being tried in any place out of England or Ireland for any murder or manslaughter committed out of England or Ireland in the same manner as such person might have been tried before the passing of this Act. 10. Where any person being [criminally] stricken, poisoned, or otherwise hurt upon the sea, or at any place out of England or Ireland, shall die of such stroke, poisoning, or hurt in England or Ireland, or, being [criminally] stricken, poisoned, or otherwise hurt in any place in England or Ireland, shall die of such stroke, poisoning, or hurt upon the sea, or at any place out of England or Ireland, every offence committed in respect of any such case, whether the same shall amount to the offence of murder or of manslaughter, may be tried ... in England.

Sections 9 and 10 respectively replace sections 7 and 8 of the Offences Against the Person Act 1828 (9 Geo. 4. c. 31). Section 10 was first enacted in 1728/29 by the Murder Act 1728 (2 Geo. 2. c. 21).

See also section 72 of the Domestic Abuse Act 2021.

== Attempts to murder ==
Sections 11 to 15 of the act dealt with attempts to murder and have been repealed. See now the Criminal Attempts Act 1981.

Section 11 – Administering poison or wounding or causing grievous bodily harm with intent to murder

Section 11 of the act replaced section 2 of the Offences Against the Person Act 1837 (7 Will. 4 & 1 Vict. c. 85).

Section 12 – Destroying or damaging a building with gunpowder with intent to murder

Section 12 of the act replaced section 2 of the Arson Act 1846 (9 & 10 Vict. c. 25) (Malicious injuries by fire)

Section 13 – Setting fire to or casting away a ship with intent to murder

Section 14 – Attempting to administer poison, or shooting or attempting to shoot, or attempting to drown, suffocate or strangle with intent to murder

Section 14 of the act replaced section 3 of the Offences Against the Person Act 1837 (7 Will. 4 & 1 Vict. c. 85).

Section 15 – Attempting to commit murder by any other means

== Threats to kill ==
Section 16

The making of a threat to kill is an offence wherein the defendant intends the victim to fear it will be carried out. It is immaterial whether it is premeditated or said in anger.

Although the normal maximum sentence is ten years, offenders deemed to present a "significant risk" of "serious harm" to the public can now receive a life sentence under the Criminal Justice Act 2003.

Other threats of violence may be prosecuted summarily under section 4 of the Public Order Act 1986.

This section, as originally enacted, replaced the offence of sending, delivering or uttering a letter or writing threatening to kill or murder under section 1 of 10 & 11 Vict. c. 66 (1847); the other offences under that section being consolidated elsewhere.

In Northern Ireland, this section was substituted by article 4 of the Criminal Law (Amendment) (Northern Ireland) Order 1977 (SI 1977/1249).

In the Republic of Ireland, this section has been repealed and replaced by section 5 of the Non-Fatal Offences Against the Person Act 1997.

== Bodily harm ==
In the Republic of Ireland, sections 16 to 26 and 28 to 34 of the act were repealed by section 31 of, and the Schedule to, the Non-Fatal Offences Against the Person Act 1997

Section 17 – Impeding a person endeavouring to save himself or another from shipwreck

Shipping was the lifeblood of the Empire, thus, specific offences to protect seamen were common.

Wounding and grievous bodily harm

The offences under sections 18 and 20 of the act are discussed in detail in the article grievous bodily harm.

=== Section 18 ===
Section 18 of the act creates the offences of wounding and causing grievous bodily harm, with intent to cause grievous bodily harm, or to resist arrest. It is punishable with life imprisonment.

18. Whosoever shall unlawfully and maliciously by any means whatsoever wound or cause any grievous bodily harm to any person ... with intent ... to do some ... grievous bodily harm to any person, or with intent to resist or prevent the lawful apprehension or detainer of any person, shall be guilty of felony, and being convicted thereof shall be liable ... to be kept in penal servitude for life ...

Section 18 of the act replaces section 4 of the Offences Against the Person Act 1837 (7 Will. 4 & 1 Vict. c. 85).

Charges under this section are, under CPS guidance, reserved for crimes with very high intent which cause serious (potentially life-threatening) harm or showed malicious intent and caused really serious life-threatening or life-altering harm. The former offences under this section of shooting and attempting to shoot with intent have been repealed. It is also no longer possible to charge the remaining offences of wounding and causing grievous bodily harm as having been committed with intent to maim, disfigure or disable as the relevant words have been repealed.

=== Section 19 ===
Section 19 of the act defined the expression "loaded arms". The repeal of this section was consequential on the repeal of the offences of shooting and attempting to shoot with intent under sections 14 and 18 above.

=== Section 20 ===
Section 20 of the act creates the offences of wounding and inflicting grievous bodily harm. The CPS guidance prefers this section to be used instead of section 18 when the harm done was more consequential rather than intentional, and/or the wounding was less serious. These are therefore less serious than the offences created by section 18 and carry a maximum prison sentence of 5 years.

Inflicting bodily injury, with or without weapon

20. Whosoever shall unlawfully and maliciously wound or inflict any grievous bodily harm upon any other person, either with or without any weapon or instrument, shall be guilty of a misdemeanor, and, being convicted thereof shall be liable ... to be kept in penal servitude ...

This section replaces section 4 of the Prevention of Offences Act 1851 (14 & 15 Vict. c. 19). The offence of wounding either with or without a weapon or instrument under this section replaces the offence of stabbing, cutting or wounding under that section.

=== Garrotting, etc. – Administering chloroform, etc. ===
Sections 21 and 22: Attempting to choke, &c., to commit or assist in the committing of any indictable offence. Certain forms of attack have always been viewed with particular horror and the use of strangulation or drugs to render someone unconscious with a view to committing a crime require special treatment. Contemporary crime including date rape following the use of hypnotic drugs such as Flunitrazepam show that little has changed save that where the intended offence is of a sexual nature, separate legislation applies (see Sexual Offences Act 2003).

Section 22 replaces section 3 of the Prevention of Offences Act 1851.

=== Sections 23 and 24: Poisoning ===
Sections 23 and 24 of the act cover the insidious forms of attack based on administering poisons or other dangerous chemicals and substances intending to injure another. Although rarely used today, the offences remain available should the specific circumstances arise, e.g. sending a package containing a dangerous substance to an embassy.

Section 25 of the act permits a jury to find a person charged with an offence under section 23 guilty of an offence under 24.

Sections 23 to 25 of the act respectively replace sections 1 to 3 of 23 & 24 Vict. c. 8 (1860) (unlawful administering of poison).

=== Section 26 – Neglecting or causing bodily harm to servants ===
Section 26 of the act deals with the problem of neglect by an employer who failed to provide adequate food, clothing and accommodation for staff and servants. It is punishable on conviction on indictment with imprisonment for a term not exceeding five years.

Section 26 of the act replaces section 1 of the Poor Law (Apprentices, &c.) Act 1851 (14 & 15 Vict. c. 11).

The offence of assault under that section has been replaced by one of doing or causing bodily harm.

See also the summary offence under section 6 of the Conspiracy and Protection of Property Act 1875 which could be committed by neglecting to provide medical aid.

=== Section 27 – Abandoning or exposing a child under the age of two ===
The offence is in practice obsolete, as it has been superseded by the offence of cruelty to persons under sixteen under section 1 of the Children and Young Persons Act 1933 (23 & 24 Geo. 5. c. 12). The exception to this is that it can be committed by a person who does not have responsibility for the child within the meaning of the 1933 act(assuming that such a person can unlawfully abandon or expose a child), and also by a person who is under sixteen.

=== Explosives, etc. ===
Sections 28, 29, 30, and 64 created a range of criminal offences supplementing the Explosive Substances Act 1883 (46 & 47 Vict. c. 3) and the Explosives Act 1875 (38 & 39 Vict. c. 17). These remain in force, although the Criminal Damage Act 1971 covers all aspects of the resulting damage to property and the Terrorism Act 2000 deals with possession for terrorist purposes.

Section 28 of the act replaces section 3 of the Malicious Injuries by Fire, etc. Act 1846 (9 & 10 Vict. c. 25) (malicious injuries by fire).

Section 29 of the act replaces section 4 of the Malicious Injuries by Fire, etc. Act 1846 (9 & 10 Vict. c. 25).

Section 30 of the act replaces the corresponding offence under section 6 of that act; the other offences under that section being consolidated elsewhere.

=== Section 31 – Setting spring guns with intent to inflict grievous bodily harm ===
Section 31 of the act addresses the problem of those who wish to protect their property with hidden traps.

This section replaces sections 1 to 4 of the Spring Guns Act 1827 7 & 8 Geo. 4. c. 18 (1827) (An Act to prohibit the setting of spring guns, mantraps and other engines calculated to destroy human life or inflict grievous bodily harm).

=== Causing danger on railways ===
Sections 32 to 34 of the act protect the railways from those who place obstructions on the line, throw stones at the passing trains, and generally endanger the passengers.

Section 32 of the act replaced the offence of attempting to endanger the safety of passengers under section 6 of the Prevention of Offences Act 1851 (14 & 15 Vict. c. 19); the other offence being consolidated elsewhere.

Section 33 of the act replaced section 7 of that act.

=== Section 35 – Drivers of carriages injuring persons by furious driving ===
In England and Wales and Northern Ireland this section creates the offence of causing bodily harm by wanton or furious driving. It is repealed in the Republic of Ireland.

== Assaults ==
In 1993, the Law Commission recommended that sections 36 and 37 and 39 and 40 be repealed. In 1980, the Criminal Law Revision Committee recommended that sections 42 to 45 be repealed.

=== Section 36 – Assaulting or obstructing a clergyman in the execution of his duties ===
In England and Wales and Northern Ireland, this section reads:

Whosoever shall, by threats or force, obstruct or prevent or endeavour to obstruct or prevent, any clergyman or other minister in or from celebrating divine service or otherwise officiating in any church, chapel, meeting house, or other place of divine worship, or in or from the performance of his duty in the lawful burial of the dead in any churchyard or other burial place, or shall strike or offer any violence to, or shall, upon any civil process, or under the pretence of executing any civil process, arrest any clergyman or other minister who is engaged in, or to the knowledge of the offender is about to engage in, any of the rites or duties in this section aforesaid, or who to the knowledge of the offender shall be going to perform the same or returning from the performance thereof, shall be guilty of a misdemeanor, and being convicted thereof shall be liable, at the discretion of the court, to be imprisoned for any term not exceeding two years, ...

Repeals

The words omitted at the end were repealed by section 1(2) of the Criminal Justice Act 1948 (11 & 12 Geo. 6. c. 58) and the Criminal Justice Act (Northern Ireland) 1953.

This section was repealed in the Republic of Ireland by section 31 of, and the Schedule to, the Non-Fatal Offences Against the Person Act 1997.

"Divine service"

See Matthews v King [1934] 1 KB 505, 50 TLR 62, 30 Cox 27

"Misdemeanor"

See the Criminal Law Act 1967 and the Criminal Law Act (Northern Ireland) 1967.

Proposal for repeal

In 1985, the Law Commission said that this offence was no longer used and recommended that it be repealed.

=== Section 37 – Assault on any person authorised to preserve any shipwrecked vessel or goods ===
This offence is triable only on indictment and punishable with imprisonment for a term not exceeding seven years.

This section was repealed in the Republic of Ireland by section 31 of, and the Schedule to, the Non-Fatal Offences Against the Person Act 1997.

=== Section 38 ===
The marginal note to this section reads "Assault with intent to commit felony, or on peace officers, &c." It is unreliable.

This section was repealed for Northern Ireland by section 7(3) of the Criminal Justice (Miscellaneous Provisions) Act (Northern Ireland) 1968 (c. 28 (N.I.)). The offences of assault with intent to resist arrest and assaulting, etc. a peace officer under this section were replaced by section 7(1) of that act.

Assault with intent to resist arrest

In England and Wales, this section creates the offence of assault with intent to resist arrest and provides the penalty to which a person is liable on conviction of that offence on indictment.

Assaulting, resisting or wifully obstructing a peace officer in the execution of his duty

This offence was repealed and replaced by section 51 of the Police Act 1964. An assault on a constable in the execution of his duty can now be prosecuted summarily under section 89(1) of the Police Act 1996.

Assault with intent to commit felony

The repeal of this offence was consequential on the abolition of the distinction between felony and misdemeanour.

=== Section 39 – Assaults with intent to obstruct the sale of grain, or its free passage ===
Immediately before its repeal, in England and Wales, this section read:

Whosoever shall beat, or use any violence [or threat of violence] to any person, with intent to deter or hinder him from buying, selling, [or otherwise disposing of, or to compel him to buy, sell, or otherwise dispose of,] any wheat or other grain, flour, meal, malt, or potatoes, in any market or other place, or shall beat or use any such violence [or threat] to any person having the care or charge of any wheat or other grain, flour, meal, malt, or potatoes, whilst on the way to or from any city, market town, or other place, with intent to stop the conveyance of the same, shall on conviction thereof before two justices of the peace be liable to be imprisoned . . . in the common gaol or house of correction for any term not exceeding three months: Provided, that no person who shall be punished for any such offence by virtue of this section shall be punished for the same offence by virtue of any other law whatsoever.

Repeals

The words "and kept to hard labour" were repealed for England and Wales by section 1(2) of the Criminal Justice Act 1948 and for Northern Ireland by section 1(2) of the Criminal Justice Act (Northern Ireland) 1953.

This section was repealed as it applied to England and Wales by section 1(1) of, and Group 5 of Part I of Schedule 1 to, the Statute Law (Repeals) Act 1989. It has not been replaced.

This section was repealed for the Republic of Ireland by section 31 of, and the Schedule to, the Non-Fatal Offences Against the Person Act 1997.

Derivation

This section was derived from the corresponding provision in section 26 of the Offences Against the Person Act 1828, and replaced both that provision and section 2 of 14 & 15 Vict. c. 92 (which applied to Ireland). The words in square brackets in the text of section 39 above are different from those in section 26 of the Offences Against the Person Act 1828.

This offence was previously created by the Corn Trade Act 1737.

Mode of trial

This offence could be tried at quarter sessions.

Proposals for repeal

In 1980, the Criminal Law Revision Committee recommended that sections 39 and 40 be repealed.

In a joint report dated 7 April 1989, the Law Commission and the Scottish Law Commission said that, between them, the offences of common assault, battery and affray, and the offences under the Criminal Damage Act 1971, made adequate provision for the punishment of any conduct that amounted to an offence under either section 39 or section 40. They said that the Home Office agreed that sections 39 and 40 served no further useful purpose. They recommended that both sections be repealed.

=== Section 40 – Assaults on seamen, etc ===
Immediately before its repeal, in England and Wales, this section read:

Whosoever shall unlawfully and with force hinder or prevent any seaman, keelman, or caster from working at or exercising his lawful trade, business, or occupation, or shall beat or use any violence to any such person with intent to hinder or prevent him from working at or exercising the same, shall on conviction thereof before two justices of the peace be liable to be imprisoned…in the common gaol or house of correction for any term not exceeding three months: Provided, that no person who shall be punished for any such offence by reason of this section shall be punished for the same offence by virtue of any other law whatsoever.

Repeals

Words replaced with "..." were repealed in England and Wales by s. 1(2) of the Criminal Justice Act 1948 and in Northern Ireland by the same section of the Criminal Justice Act (Northern Ireland) 1953.

The section was repealed in the first jurisdiction by section 1(1) (enacting Group 5 of Part I of Schedule 1) to the Statute Law (Repeals) Act 1989. It has not been replaced.

This section was repealed in the Republic of Ireland by section 31 of, and the Schedule to, the Non-Fatal Offences Against the Person Act 1997.

Derivation

This section lately replaced the essentially identical section 26 of the Offences Against the Person Act 1828. This in turn replaced section 2 of the Shipping Offences Act 1793.

Appeal

The act 20 & 21 Vict. c. 43 said either party could appeal to one of the superior courts of common law if they were dissatisfied with the determination of the justices as being erroneous in point of law.

Proposals for repeal

As to the recommendations of the Criminal Law Revision Committee, Law Commission, and Scottish Law Commission, see the preceding section's summary above.

=== Section 41 – Assault arising from combination ===
The repeal of this section was consequential on the decriminalisation of trade unions by the Trade Union Act 1871 (34 & 35 Vict. c. 31). Section 41 of the act was repealed by section 7 of, and the schedule to, the Criminal Law Amendment Act 1871 (34 & 35 Vict. c. 32).

=== Section 42 – Common assault and battery ===
In England and Wales, this section has been repealed and has been replaced by section 39 of the Criminal Justice Act 1988. The Criminal Law Act 1977, Schedule 6, increased the maximum fine to £200. (Entries relating to Offences Against the Person Act 1861 repealed by Criminal Justice Act 1988 (c. 33, SIF 39:1), s. 170, Sch. 8 para. 16, Sch. 16).

Section 39 of the Criminal Justice Act 1988 made the offence a summary only offences, and a person guilty of either assault or battery liable to a fine not exceeding level 5 (£5,000) on the standard scale and to imprisonment for a term not exceeding six months, or to both.

In Northern Ireland, this section was substituted by section 23(1) of the Criminal Justice Act (Northern Ireland) 1953 (c.14) (N.I.). Section 23(2) of that act provides that any reference to this section in section 46 of the Summary Jurisdiction Act (Northern Ireland) 1953, or in any other enactment, is to be construed as a reference to this section as amended by that Act. This provision is said to be for the removal of doubt.

This section was repealed in the Republic of Ireland by section 31 of, and the Schedule to, the Non-Fatal Offences Against the Person Act 1997.

=== Section 43 – Aggravated assault and battery ===
This section replaces section 1 of the Criminal Procedure Act 1853 (16 & 17 Vict. c. 30) (aggravated assaults upon women and children)

In England and Wales, this section has been repealed and has not been replaced. The Criminal Law Act 1977, Schedule 6, increased the maximum fine to £500.

In Northern Ireland, this section makes provision for the summary prosecution of aggravated assaults on women and children. The maximum fine for this offence was increased by section 60(2) of the Summary Jurisdiction and Criminal Justice Act (Northern Ireland) 1935 (c. 13) (N.I.)

In the Republic of Ireland, this section was repealed by section 26 of, and the second schedule to, the Criminal Justice Act 1951 (No.2)

Section 44 and 45

In the Republic of Ireland, these sections was repealed by section 26 of, and the second schedule to, the Criminal Justice Act 1951 (No.2)

Section 46

This section was repealed in the Republic of Ireland by section 31 of, and the Schedule to, the Non-Fatal Offences Against the Person Act 1997.

=== Section 47 ===
In Queen's Printer copies of this act, the marginal notes to this section read "assault occasioning bodily harm" and "common assault".

This section was repealed in the Republic of Ireland by section 31 of, and the Schedule to, the Non-Fatal Offences Against the Person Act 1997.

Assault occasioning actual bodily harm

In England and Wales, and in Northern Ireland, this section creates the offence of assault occasioning actual bodily harm and provides the penalty to which a person is liable on conviction of that offence on indictment.

In the Republic of Ireland this offence has been replaced by the offence of assault causing harm under section 3 of the Non-Fatal Offences Against the Person Act 1997.

Common assault

In England and Wales, the provision in this section relating to common assault has been repealed.

This is an either way offence. In Northern Ireland, it is written that a person who is convicted on indictment (before a Crown Court thus for more serious instances) of common assault is liable to imprisonment for a term not exceeding two years. This amounts to a doubling (of the maximum) by article 4(2)(b) of the Criminal Justice (No.2) (Northern Ireland) Order 2004.

== Rape, abduction and defilement of women ==
=== Section 48 – Rape ===
Section 48 of the act provided that a person guilty of rape was liable to be kept in penal servitude for life or for any term not less than three years or to be imprisoned (with or without hard labour) for any term not exceeding two years.

It was a revised version of section 16 of the Offences Against the Person Act 1828 (9 Geo. 4. c. 31), incorporating the non-textual amendments made to that section by section 3 of the Substitution of Punishments of Death Act 1841 (4 & 5 Vict. c. 56) and section 2 of the Penal Servitude Act 1857 (20 & 21 Vict. c. 3). It replaced section 16 of the 1828 act and the corresponding provision in section 3 of the 1841 act, which were repealed.

Section 48 of the act was repealed for England and Wales by section 51 of, and the fourth schedule to, the Sexual Offences Act 1956 (4 & 5 Eliz. 2. c. 69), which came into force on 1 January 1957. It was replaced by section 1(1) of the 1956 act.

In Northern Ireland, repeal of this section was consequential upon the codification of the law relating to sexual offences by the Sexual Offences (Northern Ireland) Order 2008.

=== Section 49 – Procuring, by false pretences, false representations or other fraud, a girl under 21 to have illicit carnal connexion with any man ===
The expression 'illicit carnal connexion' means extramarital sexual intercourse.

This section replaced section 1 of 12 & 13 Vict. c. 76 (1849) (procuring the defilement of women).

Section 49 of the act was repealed by section 19 of, and the schedule to, the Criminal Law Amendment Act 1885 (48 & 49 Vict. c. 69), which came into force on 14 August 1885. It was replaced by section 2(1) of the 1885 act.

=== Section 50 – Carnal knowledge of girls under 12 ===
Section 50 of the act replaced section 17 of the Offences Against the Person Act 1828 (9 Geo. 4. c. 31) and the corresponding provision in section 3 of the Substitution of Punishments of Death Act 1841 (4 & 5 Vict. c. 56) and incorporated the non-textual amendment made by section 2 of the Penal Servitude Act 1857 (20 & 21 Vict. c. 3).

Sections 50 and 51 of the act were repealed by section 2 of the Offences Against the Person Act 1875 (38 & 39 Vict. c. 94). They were replaced by sections 3 and 4 of the 1875 act, which had a broader scope.

=== Section 52 – Indecent assault upon a female ===
Section 52 of the act was repealed for England and Wales by section 51 of, and the fourth schedule to, the Sexual Offences Act 1956 (4 & 5 Eliz. 2. c. 69), which came into force on 1 January 1957. It was replaced by section 14(1) of the 1956 act.

In Northern Ireland, repeal of this section was consequential upon the codification of the law relating to sexual offences.

=== Section 53 & 54 – Abduction ===
Sections 53 to 56 were repealed for the Republic of Ireland by section 31 of, and the schedule to, the Non-Fatal Offences Against the Person Act 1997.

Sections 53 and 54 created various offences of abduction, including:

Forcible abduction of any woman with intent to marry or carnally know her. This would be charged as the common law offences of kidnapping and false imprisonment, or rape, and/or human trafficking under the Sexual Offences Act 2003.

Section 53 and 54 of the act were repealed for England and Wales by section 51 of, and the fourth schedule to, the Sexual Offences Act 1956 (4 & 5 Eliz. 2. c. 69), which came into force on 1 January 1957. They were replaced by sections 17 and 18, and 17(1), of the 1956 act, respectively.

In Northern Ireland, repeal of these sections was consequential upon the codification of the law relating to sexual offences.

=== Section 55 – Abduction of a girl under 16 ===
Section 55 of the act was repealed for England and Wales by section 51 of, and the fourth schedule to, the Sexual Offences Act 1956 (4 & 5 Eliz. 2. c. 69), which came into force on 1 January 1957. It was replaced by section 20 of the 1956 act..

In Northern Ireland, repeal of this section was consequential upon the codification of the law relating to sexual offences.

== Child stealing ==
Section 56 created the offence of child stealing. In England and Wales, it has been repealed and replaced by the Child Abduction Act 1984.

== Bigamy ==
Section 57 – Bigamy

This section creates the offence of bigamy. It replaces section 22 of the Offences Against the Person Act 1828.

== Abortion ==
Section 58, creating the offence of administering drugs or using instruments to procure abortion, replaced section 6 of the Offences Against the Person Act 1837, and provides:

58. Every woman, being with child, who, with intent to procure her own miscarriage, shall unlawfully administer to herself any poison or other noxious thing, or shall unlawfully use any instrument or other means whatsoever with the like intent, and whosoever, with intent to procure the miscarriage of any woman whether she be or be not with child, shall unlawfully administer to her or cause to be taken by her any poison or other noxious thing, or unlawfully use any instrument or other means whatsoever with the like intent, shall be guilty of felony, and being convicted thereof shall be liable ... to be kept in penal servitude for life ...

An offence under section 58 is punishable with imprisonment for life or for any shorter term.

Section 59 created an offence of procuring drugs to cause abortion, and provides:

59. Whosoever shall unlawfully supply or procure any poison or other noxious thing, or any instrument or thing whatsoever, knowing that the same is intended to be unlawfully used or employed with intent to procure the miscarriage of any woman, whether she be or be not with child, shall be guilty of a misdemeanor, and being convicted thereof shall be liable ... to be kept in penal servitude ...

An offence under section 59 is punishable with imprisonment for a term not exceeding five years.

=== England & Wales ===
Guidance from the Crown Prosecution Service describes procuring an abortion unlawfully as a child abuse offence and indicates that section 58 and 59 offences may include:

- honour-based crimes committed to punish women for alleged or perceived breaches of the family and/or community's code of behaviour;
- repeated or continued controlling or coercive behaviour;
- domestic abuse incidents triggered by a pregnancy.

With the increasing availability of medicines for abortion, the Medicines and Healthcare products Regulatory Agency has stated that medicines are not ordinary consumer goods and have the potential to cause harm, and selling medication with no medical qualifications is illegal and can be extremely dangerous.

Sections 58 and 59 continue to apply in England and Wales, alongside the Infant Life (Preservation) Act 1929 (19 & 20 Geo. 5. c. 34) which created a separate legal protection after 28 weeks of gestation, through the creation of the offence of child destruction:

(1) ... no person shall be found guilty of an offence under this section unless it is proved that the act which caused the death of the child was not done in good faith for the purpose only of preserving the life of the mother.

(2) For the purposes of this Act, evidence that a woman had at any material time been pregnant for a period of twenty-eight weeks or more shall be primâ facie proof that she was at that time pregnant of a child capable of being born alive.

The Abortion Act 1967 recognises "the law relating to abortion" as sections 58 and 59 of the Offences Against the Person Act 1861 in England and Wales. The 1967 act initially had the following effect, within the 28-week term limit provided through the 1929 act:

(1) Subject to the provisions of this section, a person shall not be guilty of an offence under the law relating to abortion when a pregnancy is terminated by a registered medical practitioner if two registered medical practitioners are of the opinion, formed in good faith—

(a) that the continuance of the pregnancy would involve risk to the life of the pregnant woman, or of injury to the physical or mental health of the pregnant woman or any existing children of her family, greater than if the pregnancy were terminated;

(b) that there is a substantial risk that if the child were born it would suffer from such physical or mental abnormalities as to be seriously handicapped.

As amended (by the Human Fertilisation and Embryology Act 1990), the 1967 act continues to provide that any act to procure abortion, and anything done with intent to procure a woman's miscarriage, is unlawful unless authorised as follows, including a reduced term limit to 24 weeks to recognise improved fetal viability:

(1) Subject to the provisions of this section, a person shall not be guilty of an offence under the law relating to abortion when a pregnancy is terminated by a registered medical practitioner if two registered medical practitioners are of the opinion, formed in good faith—

(a) that the pregnancy has not exceeded its twenty-fourth week and that the continuance of the pregnancy would involve risk, greater than if the pregnancy were terminated, of injury to the physical or mental health of the pregnant woman or any existing children of her family; or

(b) that the termination is necessary to prevent grave permanent injury to the physical or mental health of the pregnant woman; or

(c) that the continuance of the pregnancy would involve risk to the life of the pregnant woman, greater than if the pregnancy were terminated; or

(d) that there is a substantial risk that if the child were born it would suffer from such physical or mental abnormalities as to be seriously handicapped.

Home Office statistics for England and Wales recorded 224 offences in total for procuring an illegal abortion in 1900–1909, which increased to 527 in the subsequent decade, 651 in the 1920s, and 1,028 in the 1930s (although figures for 1939 are unavailable). The number of offences increased significantly from 1942 onwards, at the same time as the arrival of American military personnel during the Second World War, rising to 649 in 1944, and totalling 3,088 throughout the 1940s.

The trend decreased but remained significant with 2,040 offences from 1950 to 1959 inclusive and 2,592 in the 1960s. However, there was a decrease from 212 offences in 1970 to three in 1979, alongside the implementation of the 1967 act, and offences remained at single figures over the rest of the 20th Century. From 1931 to 2002, there were also 109 recorded cases of child destruction in the jurisdiction, as defined by the Infant Life (Preservation) Act 1929.

From 2002–2003 to 2008–2009, there were 30 cases of child destruction and 46 cases of illegal abortion in England and Wales followed by 61 cases of illegal abortion and 80 cases of child destruction in the subsequent decade (between 2009–2010 and 2019–2020 inclusive).

=== Northern Ireland ===
In addition to sections 58 and 59, the Northern Ireland Parliament introduced the offence of child destruction through section 25 of the Criminal Justice Act (Northern Ireland) 1945, which replicated the Infant Life (Preservation) Act 1929:

... any person who, with intent to destroy the life of a child then capable of being born alive, by any wilful act causes a child to die before it has an existence independent of its mother, shall be guilty of felony, to wit, of child destruction, and shall be liable on conviction thereof on indictment to penal servitude for life:Provided that no person shall be found guilty of an offence under this section unless it is proved that the act which caused the death of the child was not done in good faith for the purpose only of preserving the life of the mother.

Abortion and child destruction offences have historically only occasionally been recorded in Northern Ireland – a possible effect of the deterrent provided in law and the policing of a smaller jurisdiction. Between 1998 and 2018, the Royal Ulster Constabulary and the Police Service of Northern Ireland recorded 17 cases of procuring an illegal abortion and three cases of child destruction. In several years within that timeframe, no offences of this type were recorded.

In Northern Ireland, sections 58 and 59 were repealed by the Northern Ireland (Executive Formation etc) Act 2019 and replaced by regulation 11 of the Abortion (Northern Ireland) (No. 2) Regulations 2020:

11.—(1) A person who, by any means, intentionally terminates or procures the termination of the pregnancy of a woman otherwise than in accordance with regulations 3 to 8 of these Regulations commits an offence.

(2) But paragraph (1) does not apply—

(a) to the woman herself; or

(b) where the act which caused the termination was done in good faith for the purpose only of saving the woman’s life or preventing grave permanent injury to the woman’s physical or mental health.

(3) A person guilty of an offence under paragraph (1) is liable on summary conviction to a fine not exceeding level 5 on the standard scale.

(4) Proceedings in respect of an offence under paragraph (1) may be brought only by, or with the consent of, the Director of Public Prosecutions for Northern Ireland.

Both statutes were enacted by the United Kingdom Parliament when the Northern Ireland Assembly was not in operation. Regulations 3 to 7 permit abortion on the following grounds:

- the pregnancy has not exceeded its twelfth week (regulation 3);
- the pregnancy has not exceeded its twenty-fourth week, and the continuance of the pregnancy would involve risk of injury to the physical or mental health of the pregnant woman which is greater than if the pregnancy were terminated (regulation 4);
- the termination is immediately necessary to save the life, or to prevent grave permanent injury to the physical or mental health, of the pregnant woman (regulation 5);
- the termination is necessary to prevent grave permanent injury to the physical or mental health of the pregnant woman (regulation 6(a));
- the continuance of the pregnancy would involve risk to the life of the pregnant woman which is greater than if the pregnancy were terminated (regulation 6(b));
- the death of the unborn child is likely before, during or shortly after birth (regulation 7(a));
- if the child were born, it would suffer from such physical or mental impairment as to be seriously disabled (regulation 7(b)).

Regulation 8 specifies the places where any treatment for the termination of pregnancy must be carried out:

- in a Health and Social Care hospital;
- at a clinic provided by an Health and Social Care trust for the purpose of carrying out terminations;
- at premises used to provide primary medical services;
- in the home of the pregnant woman (following a prescription of Mifepristone and Misoprostol made to her at one of the above places, having taken Mifepristone at that place, and where the pregnancy has not exceeded its tenth week; or
- at another place approved by the Department of Health in Northern Ireland.

=== Republic of Ireland ===
Legislative changes on abortion in Ireland have been framed by the context of two amendments to the Constitution of Ireland, approved by referendum. Sections 58 and 59 continued, without amendment, in Irish law following the creation of the Irish Free State and the approval of the Constitution in 1937. Article 40.3 of the Constitution, on personal rights, originally read:

The State guarantees in its laws to respect, and, as far as practicable, by its laws to defend and vindicate the personal rights of the citizen. The State shall, in particular, by its laws protect as best it may from unjust attack and, in the case of injustice done, vindicate the life, person, good name, and property rights of every citizen.

The Eighth Amendment, in effect from 1983 to 2018, with amendment from 1992, added:

The State acknowledges the right to life of the unborn and, with due regard to the equal right to life of the mother, guarantees in its laws to respect, and, as far as practicable, by its laws to defend and vindicate that right.

This subsection shall not limit freedom to travel between the State and another state.

This subsection shall not limit freedom to obtain or make available, in the State, subject to such conditions as may be laid down by law, information relating to services lawfully available in another state.

This was repealed and replaced by the Thirty-Sixth Amendment, as follows:

Provision may be made by law for the regulation of termination of pregnancy.

Sections 58 and 59 were repealed in Irish law, while the Eighth Amendment was in effect, by section 5 of the Protection of Life During Pregnancy Act 2013 and replaced with an offence of destruction of unborn human life under section 22 of the act:

22. (1) It shall be an offence to intentionally destroy unborn human life.

(2) A person who is guilty of an offence under this section shall be liable on indictment to a fine or imprisonment for a term not exceeding 14 years, or both.

(3) A prosecution for an offence under this section may be brought only by or with the consent of the Director of Public Prosecutions.

The 2013 Act was repealed by the Health (Regulation of Termination of Pregnancy) Act 2018, revising the law on abortion following the approval of the Thirty-sixth Amendment, which stated:

23. (1) It shall be an offence for a person, by any means whatsoever, to intentionally end the life of a foetus otherwise than in accordance with the provisions of this Act.

(2) It shall be an offence for a person to prescribe, administer, supply or procure any drug, substance, instrument, apparatus or other thing knowing that it is intended to be used or employed with intent to end the life of a foetus, or being reckless as to whether it is intended to be so used or employed, otherwise than in accordance with the provisions of this Act.

(3) Subsections (1) and (2) shall not apply to a pregnant woman in respect of her own pregnancy.

(4) It shall be an offence for a person to aid, abet, counsel or procure a pregnant woman to intentionally end, or attempt to end, the life of the foetus of that pregnant woman otherwise than in accordance with the provisions of this Act.

(5) A person who is guilty of an offence under this section shall be liable on conviction on indictment to a fine or imprisonment for a term not exceeding 14 years, or both.

(6) A prosecution for an offence under this section may be brought only by or with the consent of the Director of Public Prosecutions.

(7) Nothing in subsection (4) shall operate to prevent or restrict access to services lawfully carried out in a place outside the State.

== Concealing the birth of a child ==
Section 60 – Concealing the birth of a child

This section creates the offence of concealing the birth of a child. It replaces section 14 of the Offences Against the Person Act 1828.

== Sexual activities ==
Section 61 – Buggery

This section abolished the nominal death penalty for buggery, and provided instead that a person convicted of this was liable to be kept in penal servitude for life or for any term not less than ten years. Latterly, non-military, domestic courts had always commuted the sentence. As contemporary legal commenters noted, the prior sentence of death recorded was a guarantee that death would not actually be inflicted. The new formula provided a clear, direct, by-judge sentencing band.

The sentencing band was reduced by section 1 of the Penal Servitude Act 1891 then by section 1 of the Criminal Justice Act 1948.

The section replaced section 15 of the Offences Against the Person Act 1828.

In England and Wales the section was replaced by section 12(1) of the Sexual Offences Act 1956.

Section 62 – attempted buggery – assault with intent to commit buggery – indecent assault upon a male

In England and Wales this section was replaced by sections 15(1) and 16(1) of the Sexual Offences Act 1956.

In Northern Ireland this section as worded was proven to be incompatible with contemporary jurisprudence as to right to freedom from discrimination under the European Convention on Human Rights so was repealed by the Sexual Offences Act 2003.

In the Republic of Ireland, sections 61 and 62 were repealed as regards buggery between persons by the Criminal Law (Sexual Offences) Act 1993; they remain in force as regards buggery with animals.

== Carnal knowledge ==
Section 63 defined the expression "carnal knowledge". In England and Wales, this section was repealed and replaced by section 44 of the Sexual Offences Act 1956.

== Other matters ==
Section 64: This section was repealed in the Republic of Ireland by section 31 of, and the Schedule to, the Non-Fatal Offences Against the Person Act 1997.

Section 65: search warrants for weapons, explosives and other articles intended for use in committing offences. This section was repealed in the Republic of Ireland by section 31 of, and the Schedule to, the Non-Fatal Offences Against the Person Act 1997.

Sections 66 to 79 dealt with supplemental matters.

Section 68 provides that indictable offences under the act committed within the jurisdiction of the Admiralty are subject to the punishments to which they would be subject if they had been committed in England. If this provision was not redundant in 1861, it is now.

Section 73: This section was repealed in the Republic of Ireland by section 31 of, and the Schedule to, the Non-Fatal Offences Against the Person Act 1997.

== Subsequent developments ==
The repeal of sections replaced by the act was effected by the Criminal Statutes Repeal Act 1861 (24 & 25 Vict. c. 95).

In section 72, the words from " and no warrant " to the end of the section, except in so far as they extend to Northern Ireland, were repealed by section 1 of, and the first schedule to, the Statute Law Revision Act 1953 (2 & 3 Eliz. 2. c. 5), which came into force on 18 December 1953.

Section 71 of the act was repealed for England and Wales by section 8(2) of, and part II of schedule 5 to, the Justices of the Peace Act 1968, which came into force on 1 February 1969.

Section 72 of the act was repealed by section 1(1) of, and part XIX of schedule 1 to, the Statute Law (Repeals) Act 1976, which came into force on 27 May 1976.

Sections 39, 40 and 76 of the act were repealed for England and Wales by section 1(1) of, and group 5 of part I of schedule 1 to, the Statute Law (Repeals) Act 1989, which came into force on 16 November 1989.

== See also ==
- Offences Against the Person Act
- Abortion in Sierra Leone

== Bibliography ==
- James Edward Davis, The Criminal Law Consolidation Statutes of the 24 & 25 of Victoria, Chapters 94 to 100: Edited with Notes, Critical and Explanatory, Butterworths, 1861, pp. v – xviii (introduction) Criminal Law Consolidation Statutes of the 24 and 25 of Victoria, Chapters 94 to 100 and pp. 243 to 289 (complete annotated text of the act) Criminal Law Consolidation Statutes of the 24 and 25 of Victoria, Chapters 94 to 100 (from Google Books).
