= Minister for Justice, Equality and Law Reform v Dolny =

Irish Supreme Court case

Minister for Justice, Equality and Law Reform-v-Dolny
- Coat of arms of Ireland
- Court: Supreme Court of Ireland
- Full case name: Minister for Justice, Equality and Law Reform v Dolny
- Decided: 18 June 2009
- Citations: Minister for Justice, Equality and Law Reform v Dolny

Case history
- Appealed from: Irish High Court
- Appealed to: Irish Supreme Court

Court membership
- Judge sitting: Denham J

Case opinions
- Beating the named person by hitting him on the face and head with fists, thereby causing injury to his body, are ordinary words which describe acts which would constitute an offence if committed in this jurisdiction. I would affirm the finding of the learned High Court judge on this issue also.-Denham J.
- Decision by: Denham J.

Keywords
- EU Law; Extradition; Supreme Court; Constitution; Assault

Minister for Justice, Equality and Law Reform v Dolny [2009] IESC 48 (18 June 2009), was an Irish Supreme Court case. The court found that a European extradition can be applied if the offense is very similar to an offense in Irish statute.

== Background ==
Mr. Damian Dolny of Wielkopolska, Poland was arrested and charged under the Polish penal code articles 156 § 1, 157 § 1 and 158 § 1 following a violent assault he carried out against Mr. Andrzej Lnka on June 20, 2004. Mr Rafal Berger and Mr Tomasz Wyrwa assisted in this assault. Mr. Dolny was sentenced to a four year suspended sentence. He committed a similar offense during this probation period on May 6, 2006. The District Court in Trzcianka sentenced him to ten months for this breach of probation order on August 11, 2006. However, Mr. Dolny promptly fled the jurisdiction and travelled to Ireland. The suspension of his sentence was lifted by Poznan District Court and a European arrest warrant was issued on March 17, 2007 which was endorsed by the Irish High Court on February 27, 2008. This led to Mr. Dolny's arrest on April 23, 2008. Mr. Dolny appealed the extradition order, and was brought before the High Court. There, the order was successfully upheld. The Counsel for the Minister of Justice Equality and Law Reform stated that the offense Mr. Dolny committed corresponded to s.3(1) of the Non-Fatal Offences Against the Person Act, 1997.

However, the Counsel for Mr. Dolny rejected this. He submitted that Mr. Dolny's offense corresponded to s.2(1) of the Act of 1997. Furthermore, he claimed that the description of the offense did not ''contain all the necessary ingredients'' to constitute a criminal offense under Irish law. Mr. Dolny appealed the court's decision.

== Holding of the Supreme Court ==
Mr. Dolny (the appellant) appealed on two grounds: Firstly, he argued that there were ''insufficient particulars'' stated on the European arrest warrant. Secondly, he disputed that there was a corresponding offense under Irish law, similar to the details of his own offense, he said, did not match s.3(1) of the Non-Fatal Offences Against the Person Act, 1997, the Irish statute under which he had been charged. Micheál P. O'Higgins, S.C., counsel for the appellant, submitted

''that the learned High Court judge had erred in holding that the offenses of assault in s.2 of the Act of 1997 and of assault causing harm in s.3 of the Act are separate and distinct offenses and that it is not the case that s.2 is intended to define the concept of assault for all purposes of the Act''.

Furthermore, counsel for the appellant held that the European arrest warrant held insufficient detail to charge Mr. Dolny under s.3 of the 1997 Act.

Robert Barron S.C., counsel for the Minister for Justice, Equality and Law Reform rejected the appellant's two arguments. In response to the appellant's claim that the European arrest warrant lacked particulars, counsel for the Minister referred ''to the natural and ordinary meaning of the words in the warrant, and submitted that the learned High Court judge had been correct''. As well as this, the counsel for the Minister noted that the arrest warrant was approved under s.5 of the European Arrest Warrant Act 2003, which states:

''For the purposes of this Act, an offense specified in a European arrest warrant corresponds to an offense under the law of the State, where the act or omission that constitutes the offense so specified would, if committed in the State on the date on which the European arrest warrant is issued, constitute an offense under the law of the State''.

The court held that the statute that would be applied to Mr. Dolny's offense would be s.3 of the 1997 Act, and that the appellant's submission that s.2 of the 1997 act covered all aspects of assault was incorrect. On the issue of the arrest warrant, the court agreed that s.5 of the European Arrest Warrant Act applied in this case. They agreed with the counsel for the Minister that the content was clear if read ''naturally'' and could hence be used effectively as the original charge against Mr. Dolny.

The court concluded that it upheld the decision of the High Court in its sentencing of Mr. Dolny.
