= Assault occasioning actual bodily harm =

Crime

Assault occasioning actual bodily harm (often abbreviated to Assault OABH, AOABH or simply ABH) is a statutory offence of aggravated assault in England and Wales, Northern Ireland, the Australian Capital Territory, New South Wales, Hong Kong and the Solomon Islands. It has been abolished in Ireland and South Australia, but replaced with a similar offence.

== Australia ==
Anything interfering with the health or comfort of victim which is more than merely transient or trifling has been held by Australian courts to be "actual bodily harm".

=== Australian Capital Territory ===
The offence is created by section 24(1) of the Crimes Act 1900.

=== New South Wales ===
The offence is created by section 59(1) of the Crimes Act 1900 (a different statute of the same name).

=== South Australia ===
Assault occasioning actual bodily harm was formerly an offence under section 40 of the Criminal Law Consolidation Act 1935, but has been abolished and replaced with a similar offence (see below).

== Hong Kong ==
The offence is created by section 39 of the Offences against the Person Ordinance. It is triable on indictment and a person guilty of it is liable to imprisonment for three years.

== Ireland ==
The common law offence of assault occasioning actual bodily harm was abolished, and section 47 of the Offences against the Person Act 1861 was repealed, on a date three months after 19 May 1997. The modern offences of assault, assault causing harm, and causing serious harm were created by that Act.

== Solomon Islands ==
The offence is created by section 245 of the Penal Code (Ch.26).

== United Kingdom ==
=== The offence ===
In England and Wales, and in Northern Ireland, the offence is created by section 47 of the Offences against the Person Act 1861:

47. Whosoever shall be convicted upon an indictment of any assault occasioning actual bodily harm shall be liable ... to be kept in penal servitude ...; ... ...

The words "at the discretion of the court" omitted in the first place, and the words "for the term of three years, or to be imprisoned for any term not exceeding two years, with or without hard labour" omitted in the second place, were repealed by the Statute Law Revision Act 1892.

The words from "and" to the end, omitted in the third place, were repealed for England and Wales by section 170(2) of, and Schedule 16 to, the Criminal Justice Act 1988 (subject to section 123(6) of, and paragraph 16 of Schedule 8 to, that Act).

The words "with or without hard labour" at the end were repealed for England and Wales by section 1(2) of the Criminal Justice Act 1948.

The text of this section is slightly different in Northern Ireland.

==== Assault ====
The expression assault includes "battery".

Fagan v Metropolitan Police Commissioner was decided under section 51 of the Police Act 1964, which also used the word "assault" without further explanation and without any explicit reference to battery. James J. said:

An assault is any act which intentionally—or possibly recklessly—causes another person to apprehend immediate and unlawful personal violence. Although "assault" is an independent crime and is to be treated as such, for practical purposes today "assault" is generally synonymous with the term "battery" and is a term used to mean the actual intended use of unlawful force to another person without his consent. On the facts of the present case the "assault" alleged involved a "battery."

In R v Williams (Gladstone), the defendant was prosecuted for this offence. Lord Lane said:

"Assault" in the context of this case, that is to say using the word as a convenient abbreviation for assault and battery, is an act by which the defendant, intentionally or recklessly, applies unlawful force to the complainant.

In R v Burstow, R v Ireland, one of the defendants was prosecuted for this offence. Lord Steyn said:

The starting point must be that an assault is an ingredient of the offence under section 47. It is necessary to consider the two forms which an assault may take. The first is battery, which involves the unlawful application of force by the defendant upon the victim. Usually, section 47 is used to prosecute in cases of this kind. The second form of assault is an act causing the victim to apprehend an imminent application of force upon her: see Fagan v. Metropolitan Police Commissioner [1969] 1 Q.B. 439, 444D-E.

The second form of assault referred to is the offence described as common assault in section 39 of the Criminal Justice Act 1988, which is also known as psychic assault or simply assault.

==== Occasioning ====
Blackstone's Criminal Practice, 2001, says that "occasioning" is equivalent to causing (para B2.21 at p. 172) and has a specimen form of indictment that uses the word "caused" (para B2.18 at p. 171).

In R v Roberts, the defendant gave a lift in his car, late at night, to a woman.

The woman said that while travelling in the defendant's car he sought to make advances towards her and then tried to take her coat off. She said that this was the last straw, and although the car was travelling at some speed, she jumped out and sustained injuries. The defendant said that he had not touched the woman. He said that he had had an argument with her and that in the course of that argument she suddenly opened the door and jumped out.

Stephenson LJ said that the test for determining whether the defendant had "occasioned" the injuries that the girl had suffered as a result of jumping out of the car was this:

Was it [the action of the victim which resulted in actual bodily harm] the natural result of what the alleged assailant said and did, in the sense that it was something that could reasonably have been foreseen as the consequence of what he was saying or doing? As it was put in one of the old cases, it had got to be shown to be his act, and if of course the victim does something so "daft" in the words of the appellant in this case, or so unexpected, not that this particular assailant did not actually foresee it but that no reasonable man could be expected to foresee it, then it is only in a very remote and unreal sense a consequence of his assault, it is really occasioned by a voluntary act on the part of the victim which could not reasonably be foreseen and which breaks the chain of causation between the assault and the harm or injury.

This passage was set out in R v Savage, DPP v Parmenter at page 14.

The book "Archbold" says that this test applies to any case where the injury was not the direct result of the defendant's act.

In R v Savage, DPP v Parmenter, Savage threw beer over the victim and, in the struggle, the glass broke and cut the victim. It was held that section 47 did not require proof of recklessness in relation to the "occasioning". The throwing of the beer was an assault, and that "assault" had occasioned the actual bodily harm which occurred in the continuing struggle. Parmenter injured his baby by tossing him about too roughly. Even though the baby was too young to apprehend the physical contact, there was voluntary contact that caused injury, so Parmenter was liable under section 47 because the injury resulted from his intention to play with his son.

==== Actual bodily harm ====
In Rex v. Donovan, Swift J., in delivering the Judgement of the Court of Criminal Appeal, said:

For this purpose, we think that "bodily harm" has its ordinary meaning and includes any hurt or injury calculated to interfere with the health or comfort of the prosecutor. Such hurt or injury need not be permanent, but must, no doubt, be more than merely transient and trifling.

This passage was cited and approved in R v Brown (Anthony), by Lord Templeman (at p. 230) and Lord Jauncey (at p. 242).

In R v. Miller [1954] 2 All ER 529, [1954] 2 QB 282, Lynskey J. said:

According to Archbold's Criminal Pleading, Evidence and Practice, 32nd ed, p 959:

"Actual bodily harm includes any hurt or injury calculated to interfere with the health or comfort of the prosecutor..."

However the House of Lords rejected this definition in DPP v. Smith, a case of grievous bodily harm in which the trial judge had described grievous bodily harm as "some harm which will seriously interfere for a time with health or comfort." The Lord Chancellor, Viscount Kilmuir QC, held:

I can find no warrant for giving the words 'grievous bodily harm' a meaning other than that which the words convey in their ordinary natural meaning. 'Bodily harm' needs no explanation, and 'grievous' means no more and no less than 'really serious'.

DPP v. Smith was followed in R v. Chan-Fook. Hobhouse LJ. said of the expression "actual bodily harm", in contending that it should be given its ordinary meaning:

We consider that the same is true of the phrase "actual bodily harm". These are three words of the English language that receive no elaboration and in the ordinary course should not receive any. The word "harm" is a synonym for injury. The word "actual" indicates that the injury (although there is no need for it to be permanent) should not be so trivial as to be wholly insignificant.

He went on to say:

The danger of any elaboration of the words of the statute is that it may have the effect, as was pointed out by the House of Lords, of altering, or at the least distracting the Jury from, the ordinary meaning of the words. Further, as can be seen from the summing-up in the present case, there may be an elision of the need to show some harm or injury. There will be a risk that language will be used which suggests to the Jury that it is sufficient that the assault has interfered with the heath or comfort of the victim, whether or not any injury or hurt has been caused.

R v Chan-Fook also followed the case of R v Metharam, in which Ashworth J had said:

It is a misdirection to adopt the old formula and invite a jury to find a man accused of wounding with intent to do grievous bodily harm guilty if the only intent established is one to interfere seriously with the health or comfort.

In R v. Morris (Clarence Barrington), Potter LJ., in delivering the judgement of the Court of Appeal said (the citations that he quotes from the textbook are omitted):

What constitutes "actual bodily harm" for the purposes of section 47 of the 1861 Act is succinctly and accurately set out in Archbold (1997 ed.) at para 19-197:

"Bodily harm has it ordinary meaning and includes any hurt (our emphasis) or injury calculated to interfere with the health or comfort of the victim: such hurt or injury need not be permanent, but must be more than merely transient or trifling ...

Actual bodily harm is capable of including psychiatric injury but it does not include mere emotion, such as fear, distress or panic ..."

In DPP v. Smith (Michael Ross), Judge P. said:

"Actual", as defined in the authorities, means that the bodily harm must not be so trivial or trifling as to be effectively without significance.

Glanville Williams said that actual bodily harm is a silly expression because it suggests that there is some form of bodily harm that is not actual.

===== Cutting hair =====
In DPP v Smith (Michael Ross), the defendant held down his former girlfriend and cut off her ponytail with kitchen scissors a few weeks before her 21st birthday. The magistrates acquitted him on the ground that, although there was undoubtedly an assault, it had not caused actual bodily harm, since there was no bruising or bleeding, and no evidence of any psychological or psychiatric harm. The victim's distress did not amount to bodily harm. The divisional court allowed an appeal by the Director of Public Prosecutions, rejecting the argument for the defendant that the hair was dead tissue above the scalp and so no harm was done. Judge P said:

In my judgment, whether it is alive beneath the surface of the skin or dead tissue above the surface of the skin, the hair is an attribute and part of the human body. It is intrinsic to each individual and to the identity of each individual. Although it is not essential to my decision, I note that an individual's hair is relevant to his or her autonomy. Some regard it as their crowning glory. Admirers may so regard it in the object of their affections. Even if, medically and scientifically speaking, the hair above the surface of the scalp is no more than dead tissue, it remains part of the body and is attached to it. While it is so attached, in my judgment it falls within the meaning of "bodily" in the phrase "actual bodily harm". It is concerned with the body of the individual victim.

It has been accepted that actual bodily harm includes any hurt or injury that interferes with the health or comfort of the victim, and which is more than transient or trifling. To damage an important physical aspect of a person's bodily integrity must amount to actual bodily harm, even if the element damaged is dead skin or tissue. As Creswell J. commented in his short concurring judgment:

To a woman her hair is a vitally important part of her body. Where a significant portion of a woman's hair is cut off without her consent, this is a serious matter amounting to actual (not trivial or insignificant) bodily harm.

===== CPS charging standards =====
The Crown Prosecution Service has revised the guidance in its publication "Offences Against the Person, Incorporating the Charging Standard" due to the enactment of section 58 of the Children Act 2004 which provides that reasonable chastisement is not a defence to the offence of assault occasioning actual bodily harm. Assertions at that time that minor injuries to children could be charged as actual bodily harm were withdrawn in 2011.

The CPS previously advised that an assault which resulted in nothing more than grazes, scratches, abrasions, minor bruising, swellings, reddening of the skin, superficial cuts or a black eye should be prosecuted as a common assault in the absence of aggravating factors other than injury.

The charging standard states: "The offence of Common Assault carries a maximum penalty of six months' imprisonment. This will provide the court with adequate sentencing powers in most cases. ABH should generally be charged where the injuries and overall circumstances indicate that the offence merits clearly more than six months; imprisonment and where the prosecution intend to represent that the case is not suitable for summary trial."

And in reference to vulnerable victims such as children:

There may be exceptional cases where the injuries suffered by a victim are not serious and would usually amount to Common Assault but due to the presence of significant aggravating features (alone or in combination), they could more appropriately be charged as ABH contrary to section 47 of the Offences Against the Person Act 1861. This would only be where a sentence clearly in excess of six months' imprisonment ought to be available, having regard to the significant aggravating features.

The CPS also previously said that, by way of example, it considered the following injuries to be actual bodily harm and to be sufficiently serious that they could not be adequately reflected by a charge of common assault and ought normally to be prosecuted under section 47:

- The loss or breaking of a tooth or teeth
- Extensive or multiple bruising
- A displaced broken nose
- Minor fractures of bones
- Minor (but not superficial) cuts requiring medical treatment
- A recognised psychiatric disorder

Causing any of these injuries (by assault or battery) would constitute the actus reus of assault occasioning actual bodily harm.

=== Mens rea ===
The mens rea of this offence is identical to that of assault or battery (depending on the mode by which the offence is committed). Accordingly, it does not correspond with the actus reus. Academic writers have termed this feature of the offence half mens rea and constructive liability.

The mens rea for this crime may be one of recklessness rather than intention as to the commission of an assault or battery, and it is considered to be a crime of basic intent.

The court in DPP v Parmenter ruled that, for this offence,

...it is not necessary to show that Parmenter intended bodily harm; if he intended or was reckless as to the assault, and the actual bodily harm was a reasonably foreseeable result (whether or not it was or should have been foreseen by Parmenter himself), that is sufficient.

=== Mode of trial ===
In England and Wales, assault occasioning actual bodily harm is triable either way.

=== Sentence ===
In England and Wales, a person guilty of assault occasioning actual bodily harm is liable, on conviction on indictment, to imprisonment for a term not exceeding five years, or on summary conviction to imprisonment for a term not exceeding six months, or to a fine not exceeding the prescribed sum, or to both.

Where a person is convicted on indictment of assault occasioning actual bodily harm, other than an offence for which the sentence falls to be imposed under section 227 or 228 of the Criminal Justice Act 2003, the court, if not precluded from sentencing an offender by its exercise of some other power, may impose a fine instead of or in addition to dealing with him in any other way in which the court has power to deal with him, subject however to any enactment requiring the offender to be dealt with in a particular way.

Assault occasioning actual bodily harm is a specified offence for the purposes of chapter 5 of the Criminal Justice Act 2003 because it is a specified violent offence. It is not a serious offence for the purposes of that Chapter because it is not, apart from section 225, punishable in the case of a person aged 18 or over by imprisonment for life, or by imprisonment for a determinate period of ten years or more. This means that sections 227 and 228 of the Criminal Justice Act 2003 (which relate to extended sentences) apply where a person is convicted of assault occasioning actual bodily harm, committed after the commencement of section 227 or 228 (as the case may be) and the court considers that there is a significant risk to members of the public of serious harm occasioned by the commission by the offender of further specified offences.

See Crown Prosecution Service Sentencing Manual for case law on sentencing. Relevant cases are:

- R v Smith (1988) 10 Cr App R (S) 434
- R v Davies (1990) 12 Cr App R (S) 308
- R v Hayes (1992) 13 Cr App R (S) 722
- R v Charlton (1995) 16 Cr App R (S) 703
- R v. Sharpe [1999] EWCA Crim 964 (13 April 1999), [2000] 1 Cr App R (S) 1
- R v. Byrne [1999] EWCA Crim 1892 (29 June 1999), [2000] 1 Cr App R (S) 282
- R v McNally [2000] 1 Cr App R (S) 535
- Emms [2008] EWCA Crim 967
- Nawaz [2008] EWCA Crim 1454
- McDonald [2008] EWCA Crim 1499
- Morgan [2009] EWCA Crim 659
- R v Pavia [2009] EWCA Crim 1858
- Ravenhill [2009] 2 Cr App R (S) 19
- Parker [2010] 1 Cr App R (S) 32
- Abbas [2010] 1 Cr App R (S) 47

It is inappropriate for the court to sentence an offender on the basis of racial aggravation where he has been convicted of this offence, but not the racially aggravated offence: R v. McGilliviray; R v. Kentsch.

In Northern Ireland, a person guilty of assault occasioning actual bodily harm is liable, on conviction on indictment, to imprisonment for a term not exceeding seven years, or on summary conviction to imprisonment for a term not exceeding twelve months, or to a fine not exceeding the prescribed sum, or to both.

=== Racially or religiously aggravated offence ===
In England and Wales, section 29(1)(b) of the Crime and Disorder Act 1998 (c.37) creates the distinct offence of racially or religiously aggravated assault occasioning actual bodily harm.

=== Visiting Forces ===
In England and Wales and Northern Ireland, assault occasioning actual bodily harm is an offence against the person for the purposes of section 3 of the Visiting Forces Act 1952.

== Derivative offences ==
In a number of jurisdictions this offence has been replaced by an offence which is very similar.

=== Australia ===
South Australia's section 20(4) of the Criminal Law Consolidation Act 1935 creates the offence of assault causing harm.

=== Canada ===
Section 267(b) of the Canadian Criminal Code creates the offence of assault causing bodily harm.

=== Ireland ===
Section 3 of the Non-Fatal Offences against the Person Act 1997 (No.26) creates the offence of assault causing harm.
