= Indictments Act 1915 =

Act of the Parliament of the United Kingdom

Indictments Act 1915 (Note: Section 9(3).)
- Act of Parliament
- Parliament of the United Kingdom
- Long title: An Act to amend the Law relating to Indictments in Criminal Cases, and matters incidental or similar thereto.
- Citation: 5 & 6 Geo. 5. c. 90
- Territorial extent: England and Wales (Note: Section 9(2).)

Dates
- Royal assent: 23 December 1915
- Commencement: 1 April 1916 (Note: Section 9(4).)
Other legislation
| Amends | See § Repealed enactments |
| Repeals/revokes | See § Repealed enactments |
| Amended by | Statute Law Revision Act 1927; Administration of Justice (Miscellaneous Provisions) Act 1933; Criminal Justice Act 1948; Criminal Justice Administration Act 1956; Criminal Law Act 1967; Courts Act 1971; Indictment Rules 1971; Prosecution of Offences Act 1985; Courts Act 2003; Criminal Justice Act 2003 |

Status: Amended

Text of statute as originally enacted

Text of the Indictments Act 1915 as in force today (including any amendments) within the United Kingdom, from legislation.gov.uk.

Indictment Rules 1971 (Note: Section 1.)
- Statutory Instrument
- Parliament of the United Kingdom
- Citation: SI 1971/1253
- Territorial extent: United Kingdom

Dates
- Made: 23 July 1971
- Laid before Parliament: 6 August 1971
- Commencement: 1 October 1971
Other legislation
| Amends | Indictments Act 1915 |
| Made under | Indictments Act 1915; Criminal Justice Administration Act 1956 |

Status: Current legislation

Text of statute as originally enacted

Text of the The Indictment Rules 1971 as in force today (including any amendments) within the United Kingdom, from legislation.gov.uk.

Indictment Rules 1915
- Statutory Rules and Orders
- Parliament of the United Kingdom
- Citation: SR&O 1915/1235

The Indictments Act 1915 (5 & 6 Geo. 5. c. 90) is an act of the Parliament of the United Kingdom that made significant changes to the law relating to indictments. The law relating to indictments evolved during the seventeenth and eighteenth centuries and became lengthy, confusing and highly technical to the point where some barristers specialised entirely in drawing up indictments. During the nineteenth century several acts were passed by Parliament to correct this problem, but none were entirely successful. In 1913 Lord Haldane created a committee to draw up a draft bill reforming the law of indictments, which became the Indictments Act 1915.

Coming into force on 1 April 1916, the act established rules on how indictments are to be drafted, and provided methods to amend and alter faulty indictments in court. Most importantly it simplified the layout of indictments and provided a list of items it had to contain, such as "such particulars as may be necessary for giving reasonable information as to the nature of the charge." While the act has been significantly amended over the years, several sections are still in force, and the indictment rules given form the basis of the Indictment Rules 1971 (SI 1971/1253) which replace the Indictment Rules 1915 (SR&O 1915/1235).

== Background ==
An indictment is a document formally accusing an individual of a criminal offence. Indictments have been used in English law from at least 1362, but the system was mainly developed during the seventeenth and eighteenth century. During this period indictments became lengthy, confusing and highly technical, firstly because of the large number of new criminal offences created and secondly because of the back-and-forth between counsel for the defence and the prosecution, one attempting to spot loopholes in the indictment and the other attempting to close them. A slight misspelling on the indictment rendered it invalid, and all errors were taken in favour of the prisoner. An additional contributory factor was that the indictments were drafted by clerks of assize who were only paid once per set of indictments – if the indictment was not valid they had to write a new one for free, and they therefore had a vested interest in making them as detailed and complex as possible to avoid subtle flaws. By the turn of the 20th century indictments were so complex that some barristers such as Archibald Bodkin had a practice specialising in writing them.

The 19th century saw significant changes made to English criminal law in an attempt to simplify and modernise it, and acts of Parliament reforming the law surrounding indictments were passed in 1826, 1828, 1848, 1849 and 1851. Only the Criminal Procedure Act 1851 (14 & 15 Vict. c. 100) dealt with indictments directly – the others simply amended the law around it – but it was not an unqualified success. J. F. Stephen wrote "In 1851 an Act was passed which went further in the way of removing technicalities but it did so by an enumeration of them so technical and minute that no one could possibly understand it who had not first acquainted himself with the technicalities which it was meant to abolish". The act did get rid of the idea that minor flaws in an indictment sunk it entirely, and Stephen later wrote that "a general impression has been produced that quibbles about indictments have come to an end".

Nothing else was done to reform the law relating to indictments until the early 20th century. In 1913 Lord Haldane created a committee led by Mr Justice Avory to draft a bill reforming the law of indictments. The draft bill was finished and introduced to Parliament by 1915, and it was given royal assent on 23 December 1915, coming into force on 1 April 1916 as the Indictments Act 1915.

== Omissions ==
Despite being the first act to amend the law relating to indictments in over 50 years, it at no point formally defines what an indictment is.

== Provisions ==
=== Section 1 – Rules as to indictments ===
Section 1 of the act provides:

The rules contained in the First Schedule to this Act with respect to indictments shall have effect as if enacted in this Act, but those rules may be added to, varied, or annulled by further rules made . . . under this Act.

The words "by the rule committee" were repealed by section 19(4)(b) of the Criminal Justice Administration Act 1956 (4 & 5 Eliz. 2. c. 34).

The original format also allows the rules to be changed by the Rules Committee, something removed when the act was amended by the Criminal Justice Administration Act 1956 (4 & 5 Eliz. 2. c. 34). The original rules remained in force until 1971, when they were significantly reformed as the Indictment Rules 1971.

=== Section 2 – Powers of rule committee ===
This section created a rule committee made up of the Lord Chief Justice, a judge of the High Court of Justice, a clerk of the peace, a clerk of assize, a chairman of the quarter sessions, a recorder and "another person having experience in criminal procedure". The committee had the power to suggest changes to the rules governing indictments, which would be placed before Parliament for forty days and passed as a Statutory Instrument if no objections were raised. This was a more powerful version of the rules committee established by the Poor Prisoners' Defence Act 1903. Section 2 was repealed by the Criminal Justice Administration Act 1956 (4 & 5 Eliz. 2. c. 34) and the Courts Act 1971, and the rules are now amended by the Crown Court Rule Committee.

=== Section 3 – General provisions as to indictments ===
This section lays out what an indictment is required to contain. It must include a statement of the offence the defendant is being charged with "together with such particulars as may be necessary for giving reasonable information as to the nature of the charge." The second part of this caused problems, because prosecution barristers would give the smallest amount of information possible to make the defence counsel's job more difficult. This was a significant problem, particularly in complex fraud cases where by the 1960s it was normal for the defence attorney to receive several thousand pages of witness statements, documents and pieces of evidence with only a vague, general indictment tying them together.

=== Section 4 - Joinder of charges in the same indictment ===
This section allowed an indictment for both felonies and misdemeanours at once, but gave the defendant the right to treat both as if they were felonies and allowed him to challenge the jurors. This was amended by the Criminal Law Act 1967 to remove the right to challenge jurors (and felonies were abolished).

=== Section 5 - Orders for amendment of indictment, separate trial and postponement of trial ===
This section allows the court to amend an indictment at any stage of a trial, unless to do so would cause an "injustice". It also allows the court to postpone a trial for the purpose of amending the indictment and separate felonies and misdemeanours into different indictments.

=== Section 6 - Costs of defective or redundant indictments ===
This section allowed the court to award costs to the prosecution for defective or unnecessarily lengthy indictments. It was repealed by section 31(6) of, and schedule 2 to, the Prosecution of Offences Act 1985.

=== Section 7 - Saving ===
This section formerly provided that nothing in the act prevents the challenge of an indictment if it fails to comply with the Vexatious Indictments Act 1859. This was amended by the Administration of Justice (Miscellaneous Provisions) Act 1933, and the section now provides that nothing in the act prevents a challenge if the indictment fails to comply with "any other enactment".

=== Section 8 - Savings and interpretation ===
This section provides that similarly the act does not intend to alter the jurisdiction of courts or places where an individual can be tried, and that the act applies to all appeals against indictments.

=== Section 9 - Repeal, extent, short title and commencement ===
This section provides that the act does not apply in Scotland or Northern Ireland, and that it came into force on 1 April 1916. It also amends and repeals several other bits of legislation with the Second Schedule, including some of the Quarter Sessions Act 1849.

==== Repealed enactments ====
Section 9(1) of the act repealed 28 enactments, listed in the second schedule to the act.

| Citation | Short title | Extent of repeal |
|---|---|---|
| 5 Geo. 4. c. 84 | Transportation Act 1824 | Section twenty-three. |
| 7 Geo. 4. c. 16 | Chelsea and Kilmainham Hospitals Act 1826 | Section thirty-five, from "and in all indictments" to the end of the section. |
| 7 Geo. 4. c. 46 | Country Bankers Act 1826 | Section nine, from "and in all indictments" down to "crime, or offence." |
| 7 Geo. 4. c. 64 | Criminal Law Act 1826 | Sections fourteen, fifteen, sixteen, eighteen and nineteen. |
| 7 & 8 Geo. 4. c. 28 | Criminal Law Act 1827 | Section eleven, from "and in an indictment" to "describing the previous felony." |
| 5 & 6 Will. 4. c. 69 | Union and Parish Property Act 1835 | In section seven the words "and indictment." |
| 11 & 12 Vict. c. 12 | Treason Felony Act 1848 | Section five. |
| 11 & 12 Vict. c. 46 | Criminal Procedure Act 1848 | The whole act, so far as unrepealed. |
| 12 & 13 Vict. c. 45 | Quarter Sessions Act 1849 | Section ten. |
| 12 & 13 Vict. c. 103 | Poor Law Amendment Act 1849 | Section fifteen, from "and shall be so" to the end of the section. |
| 14 & 15 Vict. c. 100 | Criminal Procedure Act 1851 | Sections one, two, three, five, seven, twenty-three, twenty-four, and twenty-five. |
| 19 & 20 Vict. c. 54 | Grand Juries Act 1856 | In section one the words "and the name of every witness examined or intended to be so examined shall be endorsed on such bill of indictment and the foreman of such grand jury shall write his initials against the name of each witness so sworn and examined touching such bill of indictment." |
| 24 & 25 Vict. c. 96 | Larceny Act 1861 | Section five; section twenty-eight, from "and in any indictment" to the end of the section; section seventy-one; in section seventy-four the words "and in either case to lay the property in the owner or person letting to hire"; section eighty-eight, from "it shall be sufficient" to "of the chattel, money, or valuable security; and"; and section one hundred and sixteen, from the beginning of the section to "offences; and" |
| 24 & 25 Vict. c. 97 | Malicious Damage Act 1861 | Section sixty, down to "alleging an intent to injure or defraud any particular person; and" |
| 24 & 25 Vict. c. 98 | Forgery Act 1861 | Sections forty-two and forty-three, and section forty-four, down to "any particular person; and" |
| 24 & 25 Vict. c. 99 | Coinage Offences Act 1861 | Section thirty-seven, from "it shall be sufficient" to "conviction for the previous offence; and" |
| 24 & 25 Vict. c. 100 | Offences against the Person Act 1861 | Section six. |
| 26 & 27 Vict. c. 29 | Corrupt Practices Prevention Act 1863 | Section six, down to "require; and" |
| 30 & 31 Vict. c. 35 | Criminal Law Amendment Act 1867 | In section one the word "now." |
| 32 & 33 Vict. c. 62 | Debtors Act 1869 | Section nineteen. |
| 38 & 39 Vict. c. 24 | Falsification of Accounts Act 1875 | Section two. |
| 39 & 40 Vict. c. 36 | Customs Consolidation Act 1876 | Section twenty-nine, from "and in any information" to the end of the section. |
| 46 & 47 Vict. c. 3 | Explosive Substances Act 1883 | Subsection (2) of section seven. |
| 50 & 51 Vict. c. 71 | Coroners Act 1887 | In paragraph (2) of section eighteen the words "except in the case of murder or manslaughter." |
| 51 & 52 Vict. c. 64 | Law of Libel Amendment Act 1888 | Section seven. |
| 61 & 62 Vict. c. 60 | Inebriates Act 1898 | In subsection (2) of section one the words "in any indictment under this section, it shall be sufficient, after charging the offence, to state that the offender is a habitual drunkard." |
| 8 Edw. 7. c. 48 | Post Office Act 1908 | Section seventy-three so far as respects indictments. |
| 8 Edw. 7. c. 59 | Prevention of Crime Act 1908 | Subsection (3) of section ten. |

== First Schedule ==
This Schedule contained rules relating to indictments, which could be cited as the Indictment rules 1915. It was repealed by rule 2 of the Indictment Rules 1971. The rules created by this Schedule are replaced by new rules under that instrument.

The rules set out the form an indictment was meant to take.

Rule 1(2) provided that each sheet on which an indictment was set out was to be not more than 12 and not less than 6 inches in length, and not more than 14 and not less than 12 inches in width, and that if more than one sheet was required, that the sheets were to be fastened together in book form.

The Appendix to the Rules, as enacted, contained specimen forms of indictment for a number of offences:

- Form 1 - Murder
- Form 2 - Accessory after the fact to murder
- Form 3 - Manslaughter
- Form 4 - Rape
- Form 5
  - Count 1 - Wounding with intent, contrary to section 18 of the Offences against the Person Act 1861
  - Count 2 - Wounding, contrary to section 20 of the Offences against the Person Act 1861
- Form 6 - Cruelty to a child, contrary to section 12 of the Children Act 1908
- Form 7 - Larceny, contrary to section 67 of the Larceny Act 1861
- Form 8 - Robbery with violence, contrary to section 42 of the Larceny Act 1861
- Form 9
  - Count 1 - Larceny after a previous conviction
  - Count 2 - Receiving stolen goods, contrary to section 91 of the Larceny Act 1861
- Form 10 - Burglary and larceny, contrary to section 60 of the Larceny Act 1861
- Form 11 - Sending threatening letter, contrary to section 46 of the Larceny Act 1861
- Form 12 - Obtaining goods by false pretences, contrary to section 88 of the Larceny Act 1861
- Form 13 - Conspiracy to defraud
- Form 14
  - Count 1 - Arson, contrary to section 2 of the Malicious Damage Act 1861
  - Count 2 - Arson, contrary to section 3 of the Malicious Damage Act 1861
- Form 15 - A.B., arson, contrary to section 3 of the Malicious Damage Act 1861; C.D., accessory before the fact to same offence
- Form 16
  - Count 1 - Offence under section 35 of the Malicious Damage Act 1861
  - Count 2 - Obstructing railway, contrary to section 36 of the Malicious Damage Act 1861.
- Form 17 Damaging trees, contrary to section 22 of the Malicious Damage Act 1861
- Form 18
  - Count 1 - Forgery, contrary to section 2(1)(a) of the Forgery Act 1913
  - Count 2 - Uttering forged document, contrary to section 6(1)(2) of the Forgery Act 1913
- Form 19 - Uttering counterfeit coin, contrary to section 9 of the Coinage Offences Act 1861
- Form 20 - Uttering counterfeit coin, contrary to section 12 of the Coinage Offences Act 1861
- Form 21 - Perjury, contrary to section (1)(i) of the Perjury Act 1911
- Form 22 - Libel (i.e. defamatory libel)
- Form 23
  - Count 1 - Publishing obscene libel
  - Count 2 - Procuring obscene libel [or thing] with intent to sell or publish
- Form 24 - A.B., undischarged bankrupt, obtaining credit, contrary to section 155 (a) of the Bankruptcy Act 1914; C.D., being accessory to same offence
- Form 25 - Counts 1 and 2:Falsification of accounts, contrary to section 1 of the Falsification of Accounts Act 1875
- Form 26
  - Count 1 - Fraudulent conversion of property, contrary to section 1(1)(a) of the Larceny Act 1901
  - Count 2 - Fraudulent conversion of property, contrary to section 1(1)(b) of the Larceny Act 1901

By rule 4(5), the forms set out in the appendix to the rules or forms conforming thereto as nearly as may be had to be used in cases to which they were applicable, and in other cases forms to the like effect or conforming thereto as nearly as may be had to be used, the statement of offence and the particulars of offence being varied according to the circumstances in each case.

== Subsequent developments ==
The second schedule to the act was repealed by section 1 of, and the part I of the schedule to, the Statute Law Revision Act 1927 (17 & 18 Geo. 5. c. 42), which came into force on 22 December 1927.

The first schedule to the act was repealed by rule 2 of the Indictment Rules 1971, which came into force on 1 October 1971.

== Bibliography ==
- "Indictments Act 1915" (PDF). Office of Public Sector Information.
- Alexander, G. Glover (1916). "The Indictments Act, 1915". Journal of the Society of Comparative Legislation. 16 (2). Cambridge University Press. ISSN 1479-5973.
- Birks, Peter (1995). Criminal justice & human rights: reshaping the criminal justice system, fraud and the criminal law, freedom of expression. Oxford University Press. ISBN 0-19-826042-3.
- Winfield, P. H. (2007). Penal Reform in England. Read Books. ISBN 978-1-4067-4423-1.
