= Prevention of Offences Act 1851 =

Act of the Parliament of the United Kingdom

Prevention of Offences Act 1851 (Note: The citation of this act by this short title was authorised by section 1 of, and the first schedule to, the Short Titles Act 1896. Due to the repeal of those provisions it is now authorised by section 19(2) of the Interpretation Act 1978.)
- Act of Parliament
- Parliament of the United Kingdom
- Long title: An Act for the better Prevention of Offences.
- Citation: 14 & 15 Vict. c. 19
- Territorial extent: England and Wales; Ireland; (Note: Section 16.)

Dates
- Royal assent: 3 July 1851
- Commencement: 3 July 1851 (Note: The Acts of Parliament (Commencement) Act 1793.)
- Repealed: 16 November 1989
Other legislation
Amended by	Criminal Statutes Repeal Act 1861; Malicious Damage Act 1861; Offences against the Person Act 1861; Statute Law Revision Act 1875; Costs in Criminal Cases Act 1908; Criminal Law Act 1967; Theft Act 1968
Repealed by	Statute Law (Repeals) Act 1989

Status: Repealed

Text of statute as originally enacted

The Prevention of Offences Act 1851 (14 & 15 Vict. c. 19) was an act of the Parliament of the United Kingdom.

As of 2026 the act still in force in the Republic of Ireland.

== Section 4 ==
Section 4 of the act was replaced by section 20 of the Offences against the Person Act 1861 (24 & 25 Vict. c. 100).

== Section 5 ==
Section 5 of the act was repealed for the Republic of Ireland by section 16 of, and the third schedule to, the Criminal Law Act, 1997.

== Sections 6 to 14 ==
Section 6 of the act was replaced, in so far as it related to malicious injuries to property, by section 35 of the Malicious Damage Act 1861 (24 & 25 Vict. c. 97).

Section 11 of the act was repealed by section 119 of, and part I of schedule 7 to, the Police and Criminal Evidence Act 1984.

Sections 12 and 13 of the act were repealed for England and Wales by section 33(3) of, and part II of schedule 3 to, the Theft Act 1968.

Section 14 of the act was repealed for the Republic of Ireland by section 16 of, and the Third Schedule to, the Criminal Law Act, 1997.

== Subsequent developments ==
Section 5 of the act was repealed for England and Wales by section 10(2) of, and part III of schedule 3 to, the Criminal Law Act 1967, which came into force on 1 January 1968.

The act was retained for the Republic of Ireland by section 2(2)(a) of, and part 4 of schedule 1 to, the Statute Law Revision Act 2007, which came into force on 8 May 2007. There is a saving for the act in section 2(2)(b) of the Statute Law Revision Act 2009.

The whole act was repealed for the England and Wales and Northern Ireland by section 1(1) of, and group 5 of part I of schedule 1 to, the Statute Law (Repeals) Act 1989, which came into force on 16 November 1989.
