= Offences Against the Person Act 1875 =

Act of the Parliament of the United Kingdom

Offences against the Person Act 1875 (Note: Section 1.)
- Act of Parliament
- Parliament of the United Kingdom
- Long title: An Act to amend the Law relating to Offences against the Person.
- Citation: 38 & 39 Vict. c. 94
- Territorial extent: England and Wales; Ireland; (Note: Section 6.)

Dates
- Royal assent: 13 August 1875
- Commencement: 13 August 1875 (Note: The Acts of Parliament (Commencement) Act 1793.)
- Repealed: 14 August 1885
Other legislation
Amends	Offences against the Person Act 1861
Amended by	Statute Law Revision Act 1883
Repealed by	Criminal Law Amendment Act 1885

Status: Repealed

Text of statute as originally enacted

The Offences against the Person Act 1875 (38 & 39 Vict. c. 94) was an act of the Parliament of the United Kingdom that extended the scope of sexual offences against girls.

== Provisions ==
=== Section 2 ===
Section 2 of the act repealed sections 50 and 51 of the Offences against the Person Act 1861 (24 & 25 Vict. c. 100) with savings.

2. Sections fifty and fifty-one of the Act of the twenty-fourth and twenty-fifth years of the reign of Her Majesty, chapter one hundred, are hereby repealed, except as to any thing heretofore duly done thereunder, and except so far as may be necessary for the purpose of supporting and continuing any proceeding taken or of prosecuting or punishing any person for any offence committed before the passing of this Act.

=== Section 3 – Abusing a girl under 12 ===
Section 3 of the act replaced section 50 of the Offences against the Person Act 1861 (24 & 25 Vict. c. 100) (which created a felony in relation only to girls under 10).

When the act was repealed, section 3 of the act was in turn replaced by section 4 of the Criminal Law Amendment Act 1885 (48 & 49 Vict. c. 69) (increasing the age to 13).

3. Whosoever shall unlawfully and carnally know and abuse any girl under the age of twelve years shall be guilty of felony, and being convicted thereof, shall be liable, at the discretion of the court, to be kept in penal servitude for life or for any term not less than five years, or to be imprisoned for any term not exceeding two years, with or without hard labour.

=== Section 4 – Abusing a girl between 12 and 13 ===
Section 4 of the act replaced section 51 of the Offences against the Person Act 1861 (24 & 25 Vict. c. 100) (which created a misdemeanour in relation to girls between 10 and 12).

When the act was repealed, section 4 of the act was turn replaced by section 5(1) of the Criminal Law Amendment Act 1885 (48 & 49 Vict. c. 69) (changing the age range from 13 to 16).

4. Whosoever shall unlawfully and carnally know abuse any girl being above the age of twelve years and the age of thirteen years, whether with or without her consent, shall be guilty of a misdemeanour, and being convicted thereof, shall be liable, at the discretion of the court, to imprisoned for any term not exceeding two years, with without hard labour.

=== Section 5 ===
Section 5 of the act provided that the act was to be construed as though it and the Offences against the Person Act 1861 (24 & 25 Vict. c. 100) (as amended by this act) were one act.

Its effect was that the definition of carnal knowledge provided by section 63 of that act applied to the offences created by sections 3 and 4 of this act.

5. This Act shall be deemed to be incorporated with Act of the twenty-fourth and twenty-fifth years of the reign of Her Majesty, chapter one hundred, and shall be construed as if the said Act (except such parts thereof as are repealed or amended by this Act) and this Act were one Act.

=== Section 6 – Extent ===
Section 6 of the act provided that the act did not extend to Scotland.

6. This Act shall not extend to Scotland.

== Subsequent developments ==
The whole act was repealed by section 19 of, and the schedule to, the Criminal Law Amendment Act 1885 (48 & 49 Vict. c. 69), which came into force on 14 August 1885.

== See also ==
- Offences Against the Person Act
