= Criminal damage in English law =

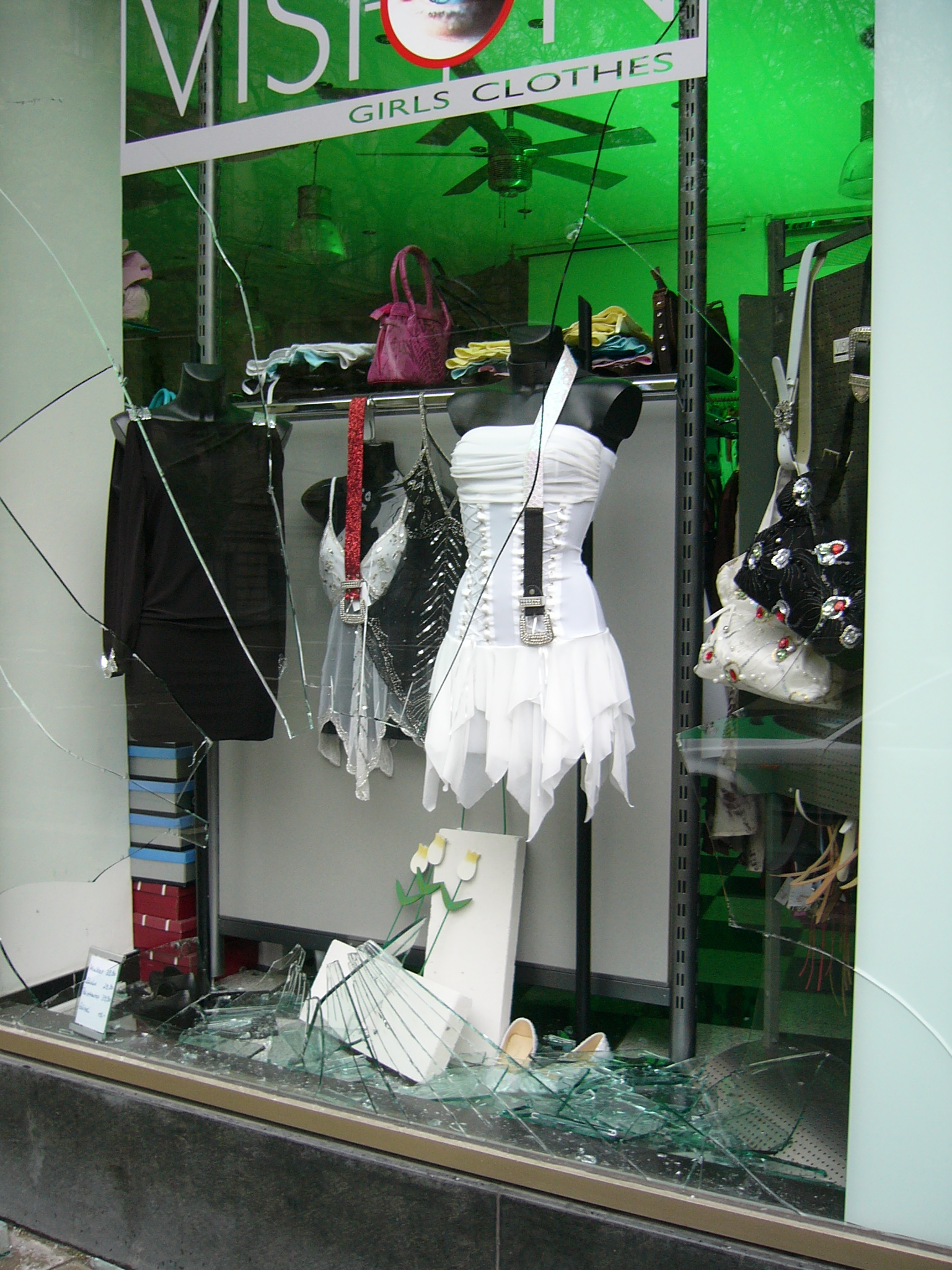
A smashed shop window – photographed on 7 May 2005

Criminal damage is a crime in English law. Originally a common law offence, today it is defined for England and Wales by the Criminal Damage Act 1971, which creates several offences protecting property rights. The act provides a comprehensive structure covering merely preparatory acts to the severe offences of vandalism, arson and causing damage with intent to endanger life. As such, punishments vary from a fixed penalty to life imprisonment, and the court may order payment of compensation to a victim.

The common law offence was largely concerned with the protection of dwellings and the food supply, and few sanctions were imposed for damaging personal property. Liability was originally restricted to the payment of damages by way of compensation. As time passed, specific laws were introduced to deal with particular situations as they were judged to require intervention, most particularly alongside the rise of mechanisation and urbanisation during the Industrial Revolution.

== History ==
=== Common law ===
The common law generally treated damage to another's chattels as a civil matter leading only to a right to damages in trespass or nuisance; in the 18th century, Blackstone stated:

The rights of personal property in possession are liable to two species of injuries: the amotion [carrying away] or deprivation of that possession; and the abuse or damage of the chattels, while the possession continues in the legal owner.

— William Blackstone

Blackstone labelled these as "Private Wrongs" in his commentaries, emphasising that property rights were enforced inter partes, and that the state was not necessarily one of the involved parties. In fact, the criminal law only intervened in the case of arson, defining it as "the malicious and wilful burning of the house or outhouses of another man". This protection extended to barns and even "stacks of corn". Arson traditionally attracted the death penalty, and had done so in Roman law.

=== Early legislation ===
Whereas the common law protected habitation and sources of wealth and food in a largely agricultural society, the Industrial Revolution, especially the Luddism resulting from workers' perceived threats to their livelihood, required new legislation to match the circumstances. The reaction of Parliament to Luddism was to criminalise machine-breaking – the destruction of textile-making machinery – as early as 1721. Initially the punishment was transportation to the Colonies but as a result of continued opposition to mechanisation the Destruction of Stocking Frames, etc. Act 1812 made the death penalty available.

=== Consolidation ===
A number of statutory provisions creating offences of damaging specific types of property were consolidated by the Malicious Injuries to Property (England) Act 1827 (7 & 8 Geo. 4. c. 30), which was one of Peel's Acts. This act and a number of subsequent statutes were consolidated by the Malicious Damage Act 1861.

== Malicious Damage Act 1861 ==
The Malicious Damage Act 1861 was a Victorian consolidation statute which set out detailed protections of property, most of which have now been superseded by the Criminal Damage Act 1971. The remaining provisions applicable in England and Wales are:

- Section 35 - Placing wood, &c. on railway, with intent to obstruct or overthrow any engine, &c.
- Section 36 - Obstructing engines or carriages on railways
- Section 58 - Malice against owner of property unnecessary
- Section 72 - Offences committed within the jurisdiction of the Admiralty

== Criminal Damage Act 1971 ==
Criminal Damage Act 1971 (Note: Section 12(2).)
- Act of Parliament
- Parliament of the United Kingdom
- Long title: An Act to revise the law of England and Wales as to offences of damage to property, and to repeal or amend as respects the United Kingdom certain enactments relating to such offences; and for connected purposes.
- Citation: 1971 c. 48
- Territorial extent: England and Wales (Note: Section 21(3)); Some repeals: Scotland and Northern Ireland (Note: Section 21(4)–(6))

Dates
- Royal assent: 14 July 1971
- Commencement: 14 October 1971 (Note: Section 12(1).)
Other legislation
Amends	Metropolitan Police Act 1839; Ordnance Survey Act 1841; Railways Clauses Consolidation Act 1845; Cemeteries Clauses Act 1847; Manœuvres Act 1958; Firearms Act 1968
Repeals/revokes	Dockyards, &c. Protection Act 1772
Amended by	Criminal Justice Act 1972; Extradition Act 1989; Statute Law (Repeals) Act 1993; Civil Partnership Act 2004; Police and Justice Act 2006
Relates to	Computer Misuse Act 1990

Status: Amended

Text of statute as originally enacted

Text of the Criminal damage in English law as in force today (including any amendments) within the United Kingdom, from legislation.gov.uk.

=== Definition ===
Whereas the 1861 act protected in detail many different types of property, the Criminal Damage Act 1971 (c. 48) provided a definition wide enough to apply to any tangible property. By section 1(1) of the act:

A person who without lawful excuse destroys or damages any property belonging to another intending to destroy or damage any such property or being reckless as to whether any such property would be destroyed or damaged shall be guilty of an offence.

==== "Without lawful excuse" ====
Apart from the general self-defence excuse applicable to any offence involving violent acts, section 5 of the act sets out specific provisions in relation to criminal damage: a defendant will have "lawful excuse" if

(a) at the time ... he believed that the person ... believed to be entitled to consent to the destruction or damage ... had so consented, or would have consented had they known ..., or

(b) he destroyed or damaged ... the property in question ... in order to protect property ... and at the time ... he believed—

(i) that the property ... was in immediate need of protection; and
(ii) that the means of protection ... were ... reasonable having regard to all the circumstances.

Section 5(3) of the act states that it is immaterial whether the defendant's belief is justified as long as it is an honest belief, and therefore creates a subjective test to be assessed by the court or jury. In Chamberlain v. Lindon (1998), Lindon demolished a wall to protect a right of way, honestly believing that it was a reasonable means of avoiding litigation. It was said that:

In the criminal context the question is not whether the means of protection adopted by the respondent were objectively reasonable, having regard to all the circumstances, but whether the respondent believed them to be so, and by virtue of section 5(3) it is immaterial whether his belief was justified, provided it was honestly held.

However, in R v Hill and Hall (1989), the Court of Appeal introduced an objective element to part (b) of the defence. The defendants had been convicted of possession of a hacksaw blade outside a US naval base in Wales, having admitted an intention to use the blade to cut through the base's perimeter fence. They claimed a lawful excuse in that they had acted to protect their own property located near the base; their reasoning was that the base would at some point in the future attract a nuclear attack by the Soviet Union. Given that Hill was "forced to admit that she did not expect a nuclear bomb to fall today or tomorrow", the Court concluded that this threat to property was too remote and thus the defence had not been made out, however honest the belief had been.

The case of Jaggard v Dickinson (1980) held that even a drunken belief will support the defence even though this allows drunkenness to negate basic intent; and Lloyd v DPP (1992) ruled that a motorist who damages a wheel clamp to free his car, having parked on another's property knowing of the risk of being clamped, does not have a lawful excuse under the act even if he makes a mistake of law.

The courts have said that a defendant relying upon lawful excuse as a defence need not necessarily seek to put himself within section 5. In R v Denton (1981), the defendant had been asked by his employer to set fire to the employer's factory to facilitate an insurance claim. Despite this, it was held that the owner of the factory was entitled to have it burned down (although not entitled to claim for any losses from his insurer for having done so!) – as the Lord Chief Justice put it, "[i]t is not an offence for a man to set light to his own ... property" – and therefore Denton, knowing this, had a lawful excuse independent of section 5.

==== "Destroys or damages" ====
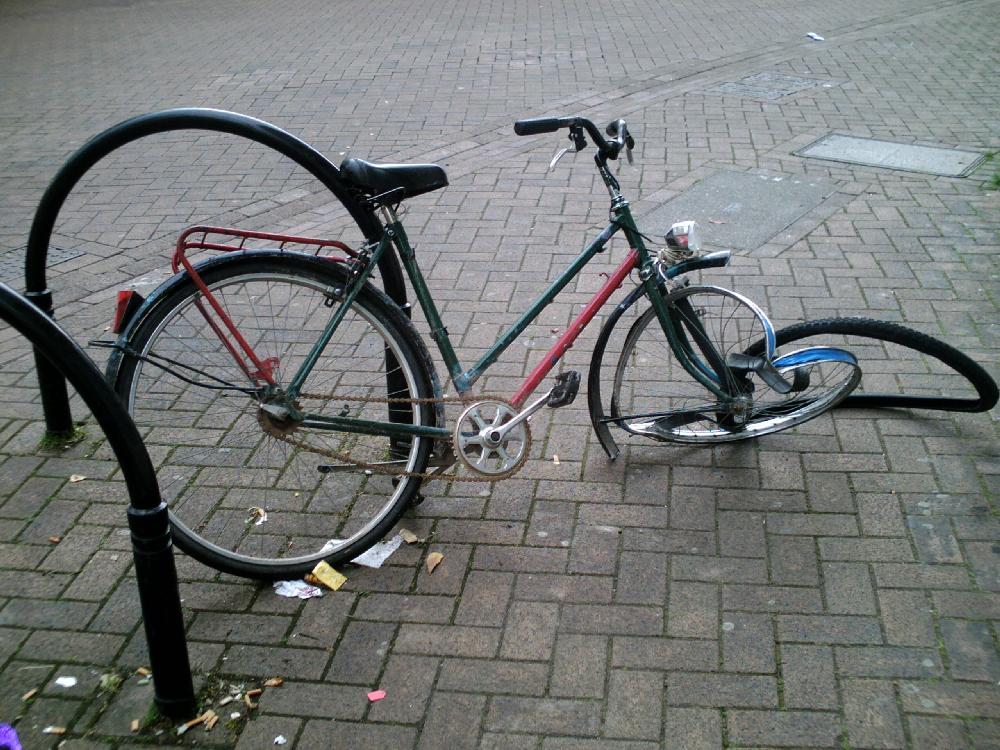
The front wheel of this bicycle has arguably been "destroyed", but the bicycle itself has not been destroyed as its frame is undamaged and the wheel could be replaced. However, taken as a whole, the bicycle has clearly been "damaged".

Whether destruction or damage has occurred is an issue of fact and degree in each case and case law suggests that damage must be more than de minimis. In A (a juvenile) v R (1978), the defendant spat on a police officer's raincoat, which was easily wiped clean; it was held that this did not amount to damage within the Criminal Damage Act 1971. In Morphitis v Salmon (1989), a scratch to a scaffolding pole could not be proven to have been done by the defendant, and the court doubted whether it could amount to damage anyway as it did not impair its value or usefulness. However, the conviction was quashed solely because the charge had alleged damage to a part of the scaffolding that had been removed by the defendant. The court was unanimous that had the charge been criminal damage for dismantling the barrier, they would have upheld the conviction as it impaired its usefulness as a barrier. Their reasoning being:

The authorities show that the term "damage" for the purpose of this provision, should be widely interpreted so as to conclude not only permanent or temporary physical harm, but also permanent or temporary impairment of value or usefulness.

A different conclusion was reached in Hardman v Chief Constable of Avon and Somerset Constabulary (1986), where graffiti, although eventually removable by action of rainfall, was actually washed away by the local authority, incurring expense, and was held to be criminal damage.

It is sufficient that any damage be merely temporary: in Cox v Riley (1986), the deletion of the program from a computer-controlled machine, rendering it unusable, was held to constitute damage. This decision was followed in R v. Whiteley (1991) in relation to computer hacking, although that conduct is now dealt with under the Computer Misuse Act 1990. In that case it was said that:

Any alteration to the physical nature of the property concerned may amount to damage within the meaning of the section. Whether it does so or not will depend on the effect that the alteration has had upon the legitimate operator (who for convenience may be referred to as the owner) ... where ... the interference ... amounts to an impairment of the value or usefulness of the [property] to the owner, then the necessary damage is established.

In R v Fiak (2005), the defendant used a clean blanket to block the toilet of the police cell he was occupying, causing the water to overflow and flood his and other cells. The defence argued that clean water had flooded onto a waterproof floor, and that in the process the blanket was soaked by clean water. The blanket would have been reusable when dry. Cleaning up a wet cell floor did not constitute damage to the cell itself. The Court of Appeal noted that this argument assumed the absence of any possible contamination or infection from the lavatory itself, and held that while it is true that the effect of the appellant's actions in relation to the blanket and the cell were both remediable, the simple reality was that the blanket could not be used as a blanket by any other prisoner until it had been dried out and cleaned. Further, the flooded cells remained out of action until the water had been cleared. Thus, both had sustained damage, albeit temporary.

==== "Property" ====
The definition of property in the Criminal Damage Act 1971 differs slightly from the Theft Act 1968 in that it only includes "property of a tangible nature". Land can be damaged, as in Henderson and Batley (1984), where the defendants had dumped rubble on a development site which cost a substantial sum to clear; it was held that this constituted damage to the land.

==== "Belonging to another" ====
Section 10(2) of the Criminal Damage Act 1971 specifies that property shall be regarded as belonging to any person —

(a) having the custody or control of it;
(b) having in it any proprietary right or interest (not being an equitable interest arising only from an agreement to transfer or grant an interest); or
(c) having a charge on it.

These provisions are similar to those set out in section 5 of the Theft Act 1968 in relation to theft. It is clearly a right of property ownership to deal with property as one wishes, including its damage or destruction. However a person setting fire to his own house which is subject to a mortgage can be charged because the mortgagee will have a proprietary right or interest in the property. Property that is abandoned has no owner, and cannot be stolen; it follows that such property cannot be the subject of a charge of criminal damage.

==== Intent and recklessness ====
The mens rea of all offences in the Criminal Damage Act 1971 is direct or oblique intention, or subjective recklessness as defined by the House of Lords in R v G (2003). Bingham L.J. stated that a person acts "recklessly" with respect to

(i) a circumstance when he is aware of a risk that it exists or will exist; or
(ii) a result when he is aware of a risk that it will occur;

and it is, in the circumstances known to him, unreasonable to take the risk. In Booth v. Crown Prosecution Service (2006) a divisional court upheld the defendant pedestrian's conviction on a charge that, by rashly dashing into the road, he recklessly damaged the vehicle that hit him because "the appellant was aware of the risk and closed his mind to it".

=== Aggravated criminal damage ===
Section 1(2) of the Criminal Damage Act 1971 creates an offence which includes all the elements of the section 1(1) offence with an additional element of intending or being reckless as to the endangering of life. The offence lies in possible effects of the defendant's actions and it is not therefore necessary to prove an actual danger to life. However, there must be a connection between the damage and the mental state of the defendant. In R v Steer (1986), the defendant fired a gun intending to injure another person, but missed and hit a window instead; it was held that although the intention to endanger life and the fact of damage coexisted, the damage itself did not endanger life. This approach was extended in R v Webster (1995), in which the relationship between the damage caused and the damage intended was explored. That case involved the throwing of heavy items into the paths of moving vehicles, and it was held that a defendant may be guilty if he intends to endanger life by the actual damage intended, or is reckless that life will be endangered by that damage. Therefore, although a defendant does not necessarily intend to endanger life when he intends to break a car window, ignoring the likely risk that this will cause the driver to swerve into the path of another vehicle, perhaps fatally, constitutes recklessness and is a sufficient causative nexus.

==== Attempts ====
Proof of specific intent to endanger life is unnecessary on a charge of attempting this offence. In Attorney General's Reference No. 3 of 1992 (1994), on a charge of attempted aggravated arson, it was held to be sufficient for the prosecution to establish a specific intent to cause damage by fire and that the defendant was reckless as to whether life would thereby be endangered.

=== Arson ===
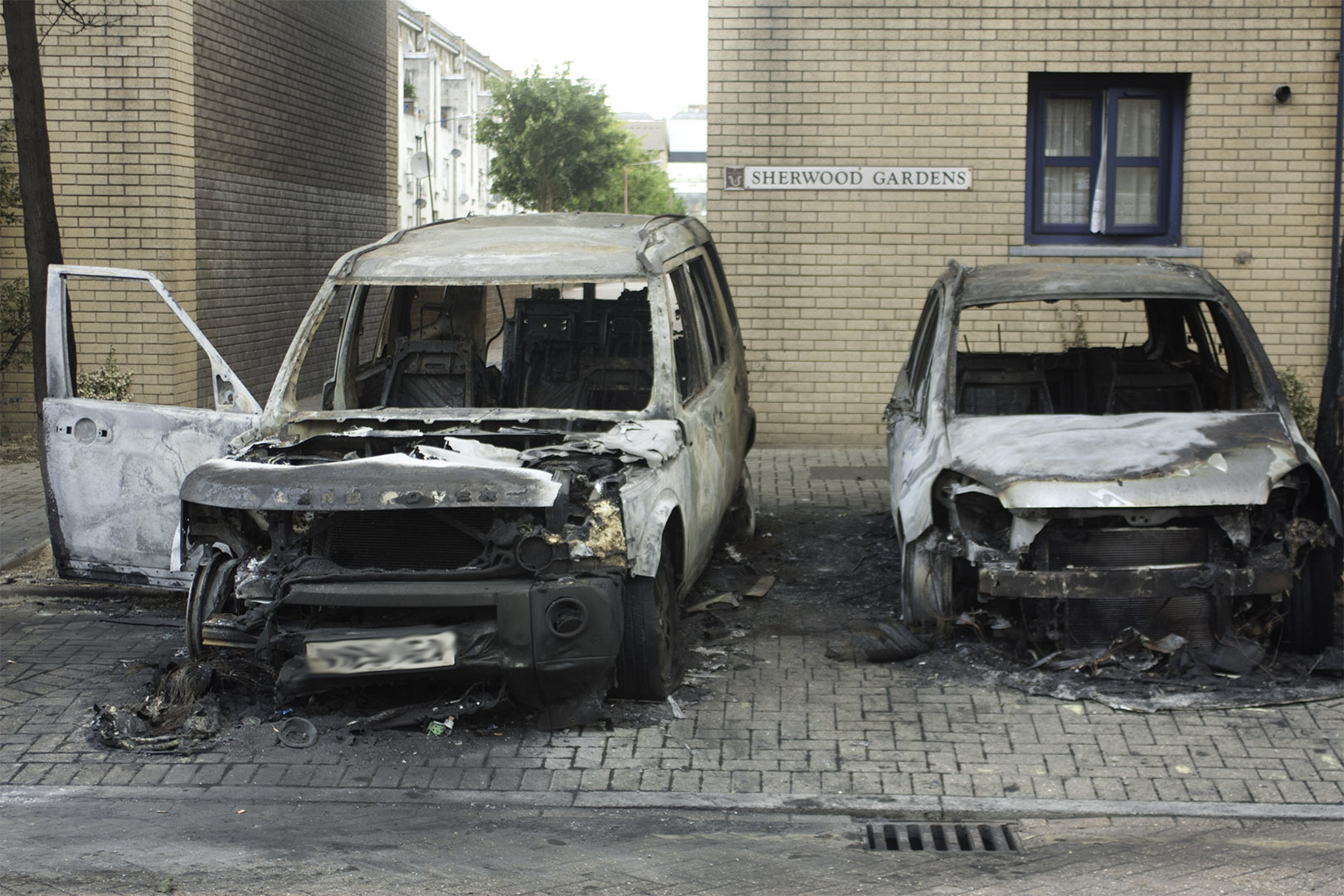
Cars in London after arson during the 2011 England riots

Section 1(3) of the Criminal Damage Act 1971 specifies that offences under section 1, where the destruction or damage is caused by fire, shall be charged as arson. It would seem that courts adopt a purposive view in relation to the lawful excuse defence in relation to arson, as in R v Hunt (1977). The defendant, wishing to highlight the lack of fire defences in an old people's home, set fire to it to demonstrate the risks. He claimed an honest belief in that by doing this, he had a lawful excuse within section 5(2). It was held, however, that he had not actually been acting so as to protect property. Although the court assumed that his belief was honest, it ruled that his intention was to draw attention to faulty fire defences rather than to defend the property itself.

=== Threats ===
Section 2 provides that a person threatening another, with the intent that the other would fear the threat would be carried out

(a) to destroy or damage any property belonging to that other or a third person; or
(b) to destroy or damage his own property in a way which he knows is likely to endanger the life of that other or a third person;

shall be guilty of an offence.

=== Possession of items ===
Section 3 provides that a person who has anything in his custody or under his control intending without lawful excuse to use it or cause or permit another to use it

(a) to destroy or damage any property belonging to some other person; or
(b) to destroy or damage his own or the user's property in a way which he knows is likely to endanger the life of some other person;

shall be guilty of an offence.

As to the mens rea for an offence under section 3(a), see R v Buckingham, 63 Cr App R 159, CA.

=== Extent, penalties and procedure ===
The Criminal Damage Act 1971 applies in England and Wales, and also to Northern Ireland by the Criminal Damage (Northern Ireland) Order 1977 (SI 1977/426).

Certain types of minor damage, such as graffiti, may be dealt with by the issue of fixed penalty notices as an alternative to prosecution.

Non-aggravated offences involving damage valued at less than £5,000 are triable only summarily by magistrates and the maximum sentence is three months' imprisonment and a fine of £2,500. If the value of the property damaged exceeds £5,000, the defendant is entitled to claim trial on indictment by a jury, but if tried summarily, may be sentenced to up to six months in jail and a £5,000 fine. Where the value of the property is unclear, the court may hear representations as to value, but may also offer the defendant the option of summary trial, with limited penalties.

Section 4 of the 1971 act sets out that offences under sections 1(2) and 1(3) are punishable by a maximum term of life imprisonment and all others by a maximum of ten years' imprisonment. Section 30 of the Crime and Disorder Act 1998 sets out a higher maximum of 14 years' imprisonment for racially or religiously aggravated offences other than those already carrying a maximum of life imprisonment.

Courts are empowered by sections 130 to 133 of the Powers of Criminal Courts (Sentencing) Act 2000 to order payment of compensation by a convicted defendant. The limit is £5,000 per offence in a magistrates' court; the powers of the Crown Court are unlimited.

The Criminal Damage Act 1971 repealed the Dockyards, &c. Protection Act 1772 (12 Geo. 3. c. 24) which created the capital offences commonly known collectively as "arson in royal dockyards"; these had been overlooked when the death penalty for murder was abolished in 1965.

== See also ==
- Property damage
- Vandalism
- Mischief
