= Non-Fatal Offences Against the Person Act 1997 =

Oireachtas
- Long title: An Act to revise the law relating to the main non-fatal offences against the person and to provide for connected matters.
- Citation: No. 26 of 1997
- Territorial extent: Ireland
- Signed: 19 May 1997

Repeals
- Offences against the Person Act 1861 (Parts)
- Status: Current legislation

The Non-Fatal Offences against the Person Act 1997 is an Act of the Oireachtas which virtually codified the criminal law on offences against the person in Ireland. The Act replaced the greater part of the Offences against the Person Act 1861, scrapping such concepts as actual bodily harm and grievous bodily harm, and recognised the use of modern technology as a weapon:

"force" includes...application of heat, light, electric current, noise or any other form of energy -Section 2.2(a)

The Act also made it an offence to use a syringe as a weapon, particularly where it is used to make the victim "...believe that he or she may become infected with disease".

== See also ==
- Offences Against the Person Act
