= Offences Against the Person Act =

Offences Against the Person Act (with its variations) is a stock short title used for legislation in the United Kingdom, in the Republic of Ireland, in Hong Kong, in New Zealand, in Tasmania, in Jamaica, and in Antigua and Barbuda, relating to offences against the person. It seems to have been derived from the long title of the Act which has come to be known as the Offences Against the Person Act 1828. It is sometimes abbreviated to OAPA, as in "OAPA 1861".

The Bill for an Act with this short title will have been known as a Offences Against the Person Bill during its passage through Parliament.

"Offences Against the Person Acts" may be a generic name either for legislation bearing that short title or for all legislation which relates to offences against the person. It is not a term of art.

== List ==
=== Antigua and Barbuda ===
==== Colony of Antigua and Barbuda ====
- The Offences Against the Person (Amendment) Act, 1982

=== Jamaica ===
==== Colony of Jamaica ====
- The Offences Against the Person Act, 1864

=== Hong Kong ===
==== British Hong Kong ====
- The Offences against the Person Ordinance 1865 (No. 2)
- The Offences against the Person (Amendment) Ordinance 1913
- The Offences against the Person (Amendment) Ordinance 1982, CAP 212

The Offences against the Person Ordinances 1865 and 1913 is the collective title of the Offences against the Person Ordinance 1865 and the Offences against the Person (Amendment) Ordinance 1913.

=== New Zealand ===
==== Colony of New Zealand ====
- The Offences against the Person Act 1866 (30 Vict No 19)
- The Offences against the Person Act 1867 (31 Vict 1867 No 5)
- The Offences against the Person Act Amendment Act 1868 (32 Vict No 20)
- The Offences against the Person Act Amendment Act 1868 (38 Vict 1874 No 4) which repealed and replaced the provisions of the Offences against the Person Act Amendment Act 1868 (32 Vict No 20).
- The Offences against the Person Act 1889 (53 Vict 1889 No 17)

The third schedule of the Criminal Code Act 1893 (57 Vict 1893 No 56) repealed and replaced the provisions in these acts as well as the English parliament's Offences against the Person Act 1866 (14 and 15 Vict., c.100), along with other English and New Zealand legislation.

=== Republic of Ireland ===
==== Republic of Ireland ====
- The Non-Fatal Offences against the Person Act 1997

=== Tasmania ===
==== Colony of Tasmania ====
- The Offences against the Person Act 1885
- The Offences against the Person Act 1899

=== United Kingdom ===
==== United Kingdom of Great Britain and Ireland ====
- The Offences Against the Person Act 1828
- The Offences Against the Person (Ireland) Act 1829 (10 Geo. 4. c. 34)
- The Offences Against the Person Act 1837
- The Offences against the Person Act 1861
- The Offences against the Person Act 1875

== See also ==
List of short titles
