= James Edward Davis =

British lawyer (1817–1887)

James Edward Davis (1817 – 1887) was called to the bar at the Middle Temple in 1842, was stipendiary magistrate at Stoke upon Trent from 1864 to 1870, was police magistrate at Sheffield from 1870 to 1874, and was a friend of Leigh Hunt.

== Works ==
Davis was the author of the following works:

- A Manual of the Law of Evidence in the Trial of Actions and other Proceedings in the New County Courts. London. 1848. 12mo.
- Prize Essay on the Laws for Protection of Women. London. 1853. P 8vo.
- The Practice and Evidence in Actions in the County Courts. London. 1857. 8vo. A Manual of the Practice and Evidence in Actions and other Proceedings in the County Courts. 3rd edition. 1864. 4th edition. 1871 - 1872. 2 vols. 8vo. Volume II is entitled The Jurisdiction & Practice of the County Courts in Equity, in Admiralty, Probate, and Administration Cases, and in Bankruptcy.
- The New Practice of the County Courts in Actions and other Proceedings: being a supplement to the Second Edition of the Manual of Practices, &c. London. 1857. 8vo.
- The Criminal Law Consolidation Statutes of the 24 & 25 of Victoria, Chapters 94 to 100: Edited with Notes, Critical and Explanatory. 1861.
- County Courts Equitable Jurisdiction Act. London. 1865. P 8vo.
- The Master and Servant Act, 1867: with an Introduction, Notes, &c. London. 1868. 12mo.
- The County Courts Act, 1867; and the Provisions of the Common Law Procedure Act, 1854, relating to Discovery, Attachment of Debts and Equitable Defences . . . London. 1868. P 8vo.
- A Manual of the Law of Registration and Elections. London. 1868. 12mo. 2nd edition. 1879. Supplement. 1869. 2nd edition. 1880.
- The County Court Rules, 1875 and 1876: together with the County Courts Act, 1875: forming a supplement to Davis' County Court Practice. London. 1874 - 1876. 2 vols. 8vo.
- The Labour Laws. London. 1875. 8vo.

He was, with Robert Richard Tighe, joint author of the Annals of Windsor (1858).
