= Davis' Criminal Law Consolidation Acts =

The Criminal Law Consolidation Statutes of the 24 & 25 of Victoria, Chapters 94 to 100: Edited with Notes, Critical and Explanatory is a book about the Criminal Law Consolidation Acts 1861 written by James Edward Davis and published by Butterworths in duodecimo in 1861. Davis' Criminal Law Consolidation Acts may for the purpose of citation be abbreviated to "Dav Cr Cons".

== Criticism ==
The Solicitors Journal said that:

"it would […] be unreasonable to expect that Mr. Davis' edition of these statutes, published within three months from the publication of the Acts themselves, and the production of his unassisted labour, should contain the same amount of information and practical utility as might be expected to be found in a work prepared and matured at leisure. In the edition before us the public are provided with the Acts themselves, in a convenient form, with an index; and by means of reference to the corresponding clauses of those statutes upon which the work of consolidation has proceeded, the professional man is furnished with a clue by means of which he may ascertain what the law in any analogous case was up to the passing of these Acts. The Acts are printed in the order in which they received the Royal assent, and an attempt has been made to distinguish by brackets those provisions which are introduced for the first time. It would, however, it is conceived, be unsafe for a practitioner to assume that the only alterations in the law made by these Acts are such as are made by the provisions marked as described; for in many instances, where no brackets occur, the subjoined note informs the reader that the section is nearly verbatim, or that it is framed upon one or more statutes; and, obviously under such circumstances new words must occur, the operation of which upon the construction of the clause it must be extremely difficult to foretell. These distinguishing marks, however, though they may not be placed with perfect accuracy, materially contribute to the value of the book. The book also contains a table of offences and an introduction. Of the explanatory notes, except so far as they contain references to other analogous Acts as above noticed, we cannot speak with satisfaction. No method appears to have been pursued in the manner in which the matter contained in them is introduced. Sometimes cases in illustration of the text of the section are inserted; and sometimes, though there is an equal necessity for the insertion of such illustrations, and equal facility for supplying them, the editor, either from indolence or caprice, entirely omits them. It is unreasonable, perhaps, to expect to find, in a work published as this is, a history of the multifarious laws digested by the Acts, or a complete compilation from reports and text-books, of the leading decisions with reference to analogous legislation, or a description of the evidence and procedure in relation to the offences provided against; but though full information upon these points might not have been expected, it is only reasonable to suppose that such a work as the present will systematically point out those channels wherein such information may be readily obtained. To have furnished references to such sources of information would have been an easy task, and would have added greatly to the practical utility of the book. It is a task, however, which Mr. Davis has not undertaken. With the exception, therefore, of the words on the title-page, "with notes critical and explanatory," the book neither contains any express promise that the task undertaken by its editor shall be performed in any particular manner, nor statement that it has been prepared for any definite purpose and no one who may be disappointed by its contents can complain that more has been promised by its editor than has been performed."
