= Theft =

Nonconsensual taking of someone's property

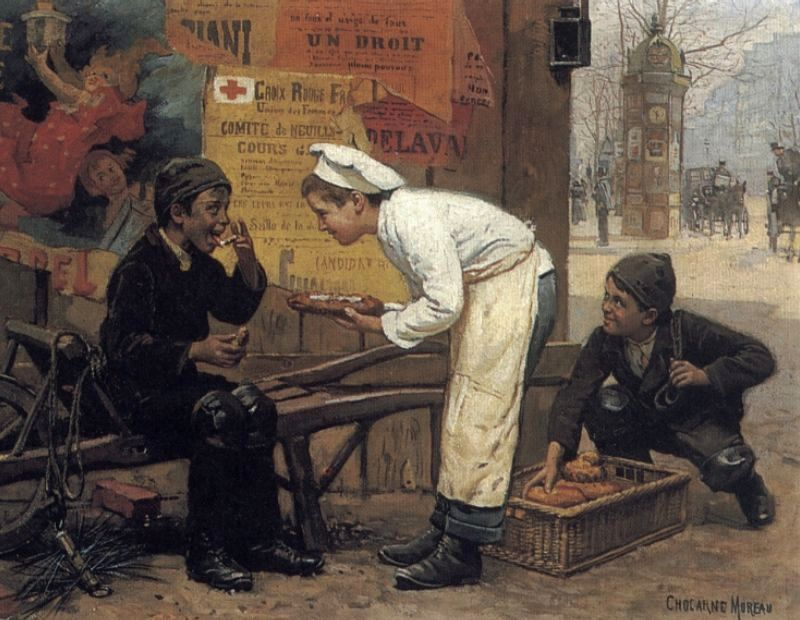
The Cunning Thief by Paul-Charles Chocarne-Moreau, depicting a thief about to steal a baked good

Theft (from Old English þeofð, cognate to thief) is the act of taking another person's property or services without that person's permission or consent with the intent to deprive the rightful owner of it. The word theft is also used as a synonym or informal shorthand term for some crimes against property, such as larceny, robbery, embezzlement, extortion, blackmail, or receiving stolen property. In some jurisdictions, theft is considered to be synonymous with larceny, while in others, theft is defined more narrowly. A person who engages in theft is known as a thief (pl. thieves).

Theft is the name of a statutory offence in California, Canada, England and Wales, Hong Kong, Northern Ireland, the Republic of Ireland, and the Australian states of South Australia and Victoria.

== Elements ==
The actus reus of theft is usually defined as an unauthorised taking, keeping, or using of another's property which must be accompanied by a mens rea of dishonesty and the intent to permanently deprive the owner or rightful possessor of that property or its use.

For example, if X goes to a restaurant and, by mistake, takes Y's scarf instead of her own, she has physically deprived Y of the use of the property (which is the actus reus) but the mistake prevents X from forming the mens rea (i.e., because she believes that she is the owner, she is not dishonest and does not intend to deprive the "owner" of it) so no crime has been committed at this point. But if she realises the mistake when she gets home and could return the scarf to Y, she will steal the scarf if she dishonestly keeps it (see theft by finding). Note that there may be civil liability for the torts of trespass to chattels or conversion in either eventuality.

== Psychology ==
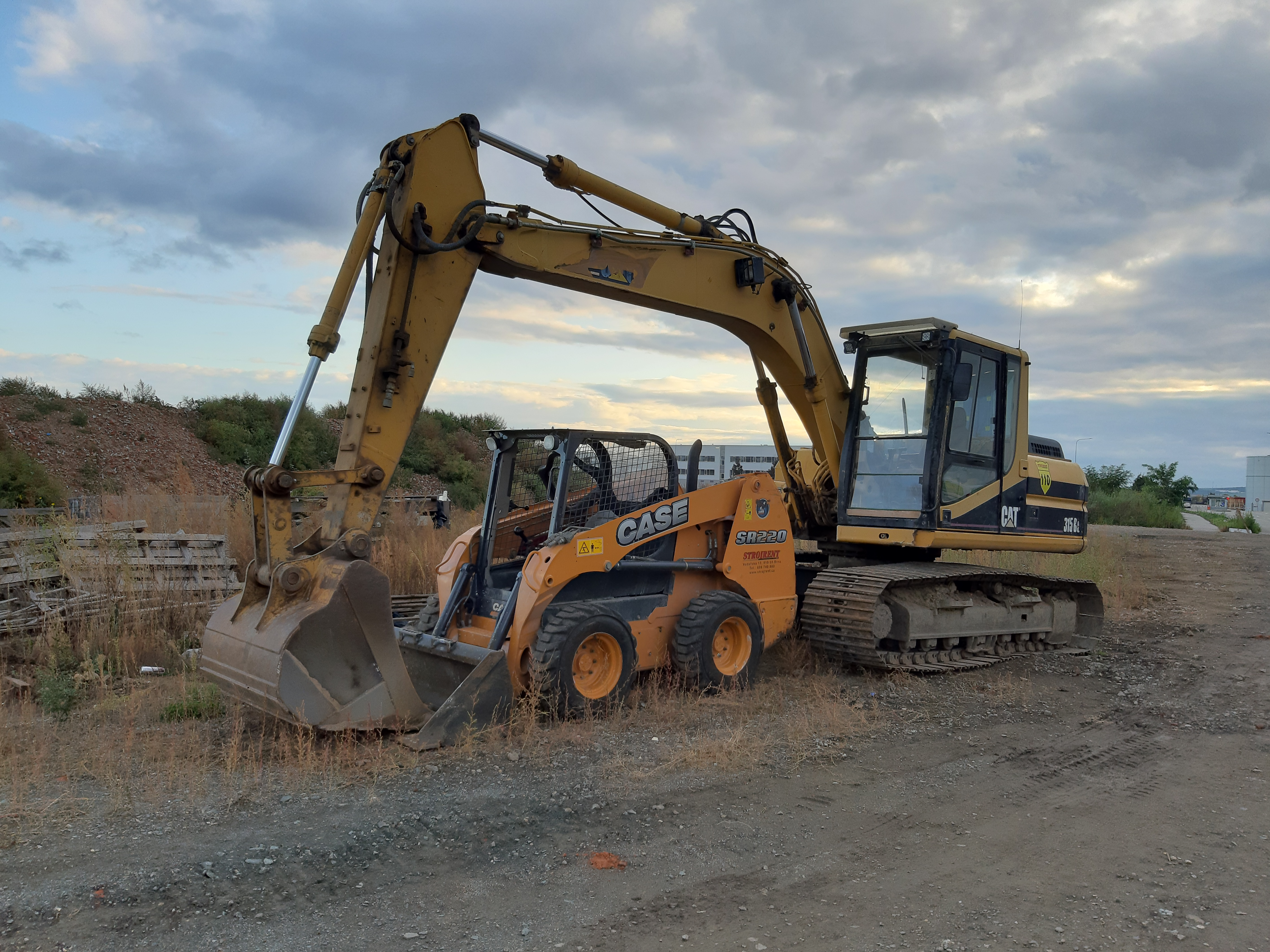
Securing construction equipment against thieves

Possible causes for acts of theft include both economic and non-economic motivations. For example, an act of theft may be a response to the offender's feelings of anger, grief, depression, anxiety, compulsion, boredom, power and control issues, low self-esteem, a sense of entitlement, an effort to conform or fit in with a peer group, or rebellion. Theft from work may be attributed to factors that include greed, perceptions of economic need, support of a drug addiction, a response to or revenge for work-related issues, rationalisation that the act is not actually one of stealing, response to opportunistic temptation, or the same emotional issues that may be involved in any other act of theft. Grotius and Pufendorf upheld the principle that a person in extreme and unavoidable need, who took from the surpluses of property holders, was not guilty of the crime of theft.

The most common reasons for shoplifting include participation in an organised shoplifting ring, opportunistic theft, compulsive acts of theft, thrill-seeking, and theft due to need. Studies focusing on shoplifting by teenagers suggest that minors shoplift for reasons including the novelty of the experience, peer pressure, the desire to obtain goods that a minor cannot legally purchase, and for economic reasons, as well as self-indulgence and rebellion against parents.

Romani people were forced to commit theft in Europe primarily for survival. Envious European craft guilds, aiming to preserve local monopolies, attempted to restrict traditional nomadic Romani trades such as metalworking and basket manufacturing. Consequently, due to these limitations, Romani individuals increasingly turned to begging, pickpocketing and stealing in order to survive poverty, thereby reinforcing the stereotype that Romani people are thieves that had followed them since their arrival in Europe.

== Religious views ==
=== Buddhism ===
In Buddhism, one of the five precepts prohibits theft, and involves the intention to steal what one perceives as not belonging to oneself ("what is not given") and acting successfully upon that intention. The severity of the act of theft is judged by the worth of the owner and the worth of that which is stolen. Underhand dealings, fraud, cheating and forgery are also included in this precept. Professions that are seen to violate the precept against theft are working in the gambling industry or marketing products that are not actually required for the customer.

=== Hinduism ===
The Manusmriti and the Dharmashastras deal with theft, coveting wealth, and punishment for these.

=== Islam ===
In parts of the world which govern with sharia law, the punishment for theft is amputation of the right hand if the thief does not repent. This ruling is derived from surah 5 verse 38 of the Quran which states As to the thief, Male or female, cut off his or her hands: a punishment by way of example, from Allah, for their crime: and Allah is Exalted in power. This is viewed as being a deterrent.

=== Judaism and Christianity ===
In the Hebrew Bible, two of the Ten Commandments relate to theft: "Thou shalt not steal" and "Thou shalt not covet". The Christian New Testament describes Jesus affirming these in his teachings.

== By jurisdiction ==
=== Australia ===
==== Actus reus ====
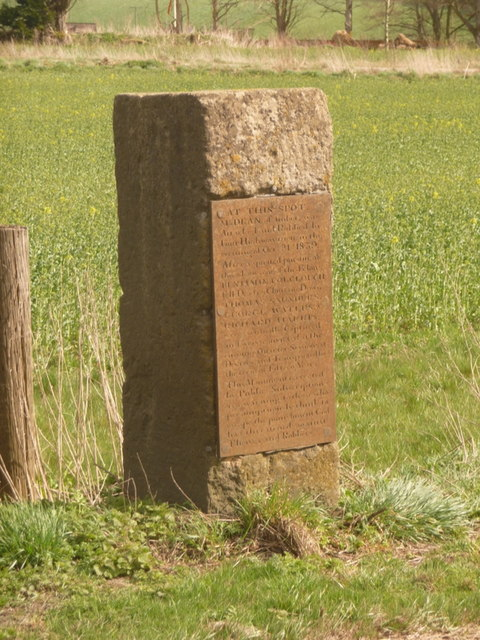
The Robbers Stone, West Lavington, Wiltshire. This memorial warns against thieving by recording the fate of several who attempted highway robbery on the spot in 1839.

South Australia

Theft is defined in section 134 of the Criminal Consolidation Act 1935 (SA) as being where a person deals with property dishonestly, without the owner's consent and intending to deprive the owner of their property, or make a serious encroachment on the proprietary rights of the owner.

Under this law, encroachment on proprietary rights means that the property is dealt with in a way that creates a substantial risk that the property will not be returned to the owner, or that the value of the property will be greatly diminished when the owner does get it back. Also, where property is treated as the defendant's own property to dispose of, disregarding the actual property owner's rights.

For a basic offence, a person found guilty of this offence is liable for imprisonment of up to 10 years.

For an aggravated offence, a person found guilty of this offence is liable for imprisonment of up to 15 years.

Victoria

Theft is defined in the Crimes Act 1958 (Vic) as when a person "dishonestly appropriates property belonging to another with the intention of permanently depriving the other of it.". The actus reus and mens rea are defined as follows: Appropriation is defined in section 73(4) of the Crimes Act 1958 (Vic) as the assumption of any of the owner's rights. It does not have to be all the owner's rights, as long as at least one right has been assumed. If the owner gave their consent to the appropriation there cannot be an appropriation. However, if this consent is obtained by deception, this consent is vitiated.

Property – defined in section 71(1) of the Crimes Act 1958 (Vic) as being both tangible property, including money and intangible property. Information has been held not be property.

Belonging to another – section 73(5) of the Crimes Act 1958 (Vic) provides that property belongs to another if that person has ownership, possession, or a proprietary interest in the property. Property can belong to more than one person. sections 73(9) & 73(10) deal with situations where the accused receives property under an obligation or by mistake.

==== Mens rea ====
South Australia

Whether a person's conduct is dishonest is a question of fact to be determined by the jury, based on their own knowledge and experience. As with the definition in Victoria, it contains definitions of what is not dishonesty, including a belief in a legal claim of right or a belief the owner could not be found.

Victoria

Intention to permanently deprive – defined at s.73(12) as treating property as it belongs to the accused, rather than the owner.

Dishonestly – section 73(2) of the Crimes Act 1958 (Vic) creates a negative definition of the term 'dishonestly'. The section deems only three circumstances when the accused is deemed to have been acting honestly. These are a belief in a legal claim of right, a belief that the owner would have consented, or a belief the owner could not be found.

=== Canada ===
Section 322(1) of the Criminal Code provides the general definition for theft in Canada:

322. (1) Every one commits theft who fraudulently and without colour of right takes, or fraudulently and without colour of right converts to his/her use or to the use of another person, anything, whether animate or inanimate, with intent

(a) to deprive, temporarily or absolutely, the owner of it, or a person who has a special property or interest in it, of the thing or of his property or interest in it;
(b) to pledge it or deposit it as security;
(c) to part with it under a condition with respect to its return that the person who parts with it may be unable to perform; or
(d) to deal with it in such a manner that it cannot be restored in the condition in which it was at the time it was taken or converted.

Sections 323 to 333 provide for more specific instances and exclusions:

- theft from oyster beds (s. 323)
- theft by bailee of things under seizure (s. 324)
- exception when agent is pledging goods (s. 325)
- theft of telecommunications service (s. 326)
- possession of device to obtain telecommunication facility or service (s. 327)
- theft by or from person having special property or interest (s. 328)
- theft by person required to account (s. 330)
- theft by person holding power of attorney (s. 331)
- misappropriation of money held under direction (s. 332)
- exception for ore taken for exploration or scientific research (s. 333)

In the general definition above, the Supreme Court of Canada has construed "anything" very broadly, stating that it is not restricted to tangibles, but includes intangibles. To be the subject of theft it must, however:

- be property of some sort;
- be property capable of being

- taken (therefore intangibles are excluded); or
- converted (and may be an intangible);
- taken or converted in a way that deprives the owner of his/her proprietary interest in some way.

Because of this, confidential information cannot be the subject of theft, as it is not capable of being taken as only tangibles can be taken. It cannot be converted, not because it is an intangible, but because, save in very exceptional far‑fetched circumstances, the owner would never be deprived of it. However, the theft of trade secrets in certain circumstances does constitute part of the offence of economic espionage, which can be prosecuted under s. 19 of the Security of Information Act.

For the purposes of punishment, Section 334 divides theft into two separate offences, according to the value and nature of the goods stolen:

- If the thing stolen is worth more than $5000 or is a testamentary instrument the offence is commonly referred to as Theft Over $5000 and is an indictable offence with a maximum punishment of 10 years imprisonment.
- Where the stolen item is not a testamentary instrument and is not worth more than $5000 it is known as Theft Under $5000 and is a hybrid offence, meaning that it can be treated either as an indictable offense or a less serious summary conviction offence, depending on the choice of the prosecutor.

- if dealt with as an indictable offence, it is punishable by imprisonment for not more than 2 years, and,
- if treated as a summary conviction offence, it is punishable by 6 months imprisonment, a fine of $2000 or both.

Where a motor vehicle is stolen, Section 333.1 provides for a maximum punishment of 10 years for an indictable offence (and a minimum sentence of six months for a third or subsequent conviction), and a maximum sentence of 18 months on summary conviction.

=== Hong Kong ===
Section 2 of the Theft Ordinance provides the general definition of theft in Hong Kong:

(1) A person commits theft if he dishonestly appropriates property belonging to another with the intention of permanently depriving the other of it; and thief and steal shall be construed accordingly. (2) It is immaterial whether the appropriation is made with a view to gain, or is made for the thief’s own benefit.

The elements of this offence in Hong Kong is almost the same as in England and Wales, because the Theft Ordinance in Hong Kong was drafted based on the Theft Act 1968 (and the Theft Act 1978) in UK. However, the "Ghosh Test" for dishonest in Hong Kong has been replaced by the "Ivey Test" in England and Wales by the Supreme Court. It is the main difference between the offence of theft in these two jurisdictions.

=== India ===
Theft is a criminal activity in India with punishments which may lead to jail term. Below are excerpts of laws of Indian penal Code which state definitions and punishments for theft.

Section 378 – Theft.
Whoever intending to take dishonestly any movable property out of the possession of any person without that person’s consent, moves that property in order to such taking is said to commit theft.
Explanation 1.—A thing so long as it is attached to the earth, not being movable property, is not the subject of theft; but it becomes capable of being the subject of theft as soon as it is severed from the earth.
Explanation 2.—A moving effected by the same act which effects the severance may be a theft.
Explanation 3.—A person is said to cause a thing to move by removing an obstacle which prevented it from moving or by separating it from any other thing, as well as by actually moving it.
Explanation 4.—A person, who by any means causes an animal to move, is said to move that animal, and to move everything which, in consequence of the motion so caused, is moved by that animal.
Explanation 5.—The consent mentioned in the definition may be express or implied, and may be given either by the person in possession, or by any person having for that purpose authority either express or implied.
Section 379 – Punishment for theft.
Whoever commits theft shall be punished with imprisonment of either description for a term which may extend to three years, or with fine, or with both.
Section 380 – Theft in dwelling house, etc.
Whoever commits theft in any building, tent or vessel, which building, tent or vessel is used as a human dwelling, or used for the custody of property, shall be punished with imprisonment of either description for a term which may extend to seven years, and shall also be liable to fine.
Section 381 - Theft by clerk or servant of property in possession of master.
Whoever, being a clerk or servant, or being employed in the capacity of a clerk or servant, commits theft in respect of any property in the possession of his master or employer, shall be punished with imprisonment of either description for a term which may extend to seven years, and shall also be liable to fine.
Section 382 – Theft after preparation made for causing death, hurt or restraint in order to the committing of the theft.
Whoever commits theft, having made preparation for causing death, or hurt, or restraint, or fear of death, or of hurt, or of restraint, to any person, in order to the committing of such theft, or in order to the effecting of his escape after the committing of such theft, or in order to the retaining of property taken by such theft, shall be punished with rigorous imprisonment for a term which may extend to ten years, and shall also be liable to fine.

=== The Netherlands ===
Theft is a crime with related articles in the Wetboek van Strafrecht.

- Article 310 prohibits theft (Dutch: diefstal), which is defined as taking away any object that (partly) belongs to someone else, with the intention to appropriate it illegally. Maximum imprisonment is 4 years or a fine of the fifth category.
- Article 311 consists of the following:
  - Part 1. Punishable with maximum imprisonment of 6 years or a fine of the fourth category is:
    - 1. Theft of cattle;
    - 2. Theft during certain emergency occasions;
    - 3. Theft during night in a residence by someone who is there without knowledge or permission of the owner;
    - 4. Theft by 2 or more organised people;
    - 5. Theft, where the thief got access by means of violence, climbing in, using false keys or disguise;
    - 6. Terroristic theft.
  - Part 2. When theft if committed as in 3 with the situation of 4 and 5, the punishment is a maximum imprisonment of 9 years or a fine of the fifth category.
- Article 312 consists of the following:
  - Part 1 prohibits robbery (Dutch: beroving), which is defined as taking away any object with violence or with threat of violence. Maximum imprisonment is 9 years or a fine with the fifth category
  - Part 2 allows maximum imprisonment of 12 years or a fine of the fifth category when:
    - 1. Robbery was committed during night, in a residence, on the public road or moving train;
    - 2. Robbery was committed by 2 or more people;
    - 3. Robbery was committed by violence, climbing in, false key or disguise;
    - 4. Robbery caused severe injury;
    - 5. Robbery was terroristic.
  - Part 3 allows maximum imprisonment of 15 years instead of 12 when robbery caused death to the victim.
- Article 314 consists of the following:
  - Part 1 prohibits poaching (Dutch: stroperij), which is defined as taking away without violence the following: clay, sand, earth, raw wood, fallen vegetables (see the source for a complete list). Maximum imprisonment is one month or a fine of the second category.
  - Part 2 increases the maximum imprisonment to 2 months when the crime is committed again less than 2 years after the first time.
- Article 315 increases the maximum imprisonment and fine category when poaching is done with vehicles and draft animals. Maximum imprisonment is 3 years or a fine of the fourth category.

=== Republic of Ireland ===
Theft is a statutory offence, created by section 4(1) of the Criminal Justice (Theft and Fraud Offences) Act 2001.

=== Romania ===
According to the Romanian Penal Code a person committing theft (furt) can face a penalty ranging from 1 to 20 years.

Degrees of theft:

- Article 208: Theft (1 to 12 years)—When a person steals an object, or uses a vehicle without permission and no aggravating circumstances apply.
- Article 209: Qualified theft (3 to 20 years)

- Aggravating circumstances (3 to 15 years): a) by two or more persons together; b) by a person in possession of a gun or a narcotic substance; c) by a masked or disguised person; d) against a person who cannot defend his or herself; e) in a public place; f) in a public transportation vehicle; g) during nighttime; h) during a natural disaster; i) through burglary, or by using an original or copied key; j) stealing national treasures; k) stealing official identity papers with the intention to make use of them; l) stealing official identity badges with the intention to make use of them.

- Aggravating circumstances (4 to 18 years): a) stealing petrol-based products directly from transportation pipes and vehicles or deposits; b) stealing components from national electrification, telecommunication, irrigation networks or from any type of navigational system; c) stealing a siren; d) stealing a public intervention vehicle or device; e) stealing something which jeopardises the safety of public transportation.

- Aggravating circumstances (10 to 20 years): when the consequences are extremely grave and affect public institutions or the material stolen is worth over 200,000 RON (approximately US$80,000).

=== United Kingdom ===
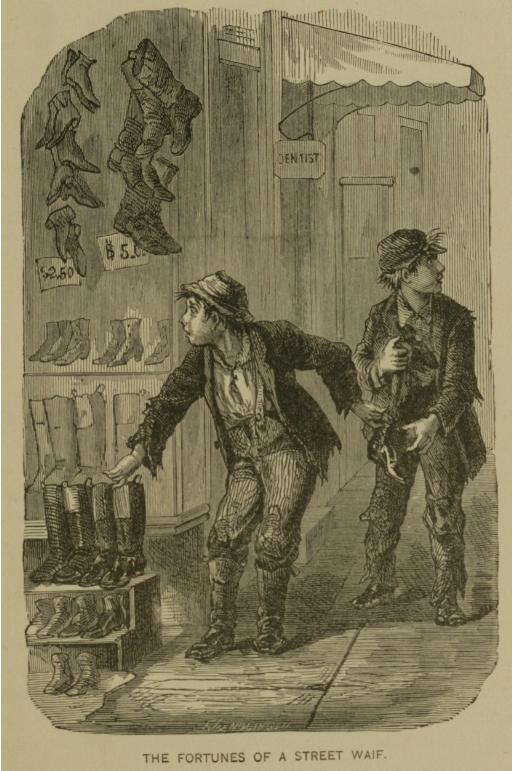
Two young waifs steal a fine pair of boots.

==== England and Wales ====
In England and Wales, theft is a statutory offence, created by section 1(1) of the Theft Act 1968. This offence replaces the former offences of larceny, embezzlement and fraudulent conversion.

The marginal note to section 1 of the Theft Act 1968 describes it as a "basic definition" of theft. Sections 1(1) and (2) provide:

1.-(1) A person is guilty of theft, if he dishonestly appropriates property belonging to another with the intention of permanently depriving the other of it; and "thief" and "steal" shall be construed accordingly.
(2) It is immaterial whether the appropriation is made with a view to gain, or is made for the thief’s own benefit.

Sections 2 to 6 of the Theft Act 1968 have effect as regards the interpretation and operation of section 1 of that Act. Except as otherwise provided by that Act, sections 2 to 6 of that Act apply only for the purposes of section 1 of that Act.

The offence of theft is typically understood to have 5 elements which must be proved at trial: dishonesty, appropriation, property, belonging to another, intent to permanently deprive.

===== 1. 'Dishonestly' =====
There is no theft without dishonesty in English & Welsh criminal law. Reflective of this, s2 of the Theft Act 1968 provides circumstances in which a person is not to be considered dishonest. However the word is not defined in statute.

The test of dishonesty is a common law one. It was previously contained in the judgment of R v Ghosh, however this has since been overruled by Ivey v Genting Casinos, as confirmed by R v Barton and Booth.

===== 2. 'Appropriates' =====
Section 3 provides:

(1) Any assumption by a person of the rights of an owner amounts to an appropriation, and this includes, where he has come by the property (innocently or not) without stealing it, any later assumption of a right to it by keeping or dealing with it as owner. (2) Where property or a right or interest in property is or purports to be transferred for value to a person acting in good faith, no later assumption by him of rights which he believed himself to be acquiring shall, by reason of any defect in the transferor’s title, amount to theft of the property.

See R v Hinks and Lawrence v Metropolitan Police Commissioner.

===== 3. 'Property' =====
Section 4(1) provides that:

"Property" includes money and all other property, real or personal, including things in action and other intangible property.

Edward Griew said that section 4(1) could, without changing its meaning, be reduced, by omitting words, to:

"Property" includes … all … property.

Sections 4(2) to (4) provide that the following can only be stolen under certain circumstances:

- Land or things forming part of land and severed from it (s. 4(2))
- Mushrooms growing wild on any land, or the flowers, fruit or foliage of plants growing wild on any land (s. 4(3))
- Wild creatures or the carcases of wild creatures (s. 4(4))

Intangible property

Confidential information and trade secrets are not property within the meaning of section 4.

The words "other intangible property" include export quotas that are transferable for value on a temporary or permanent basis.

Electricity

Electricity cannot be stolen. It is not property within the meaning of section 4 and is not appropriated by switching on a current. Cf. the offence of abstracting electricity under section 13.

===== 4. 'Belonging to another' =====
Section 5 "belonging to another" requires a distinction to be made between ownership, possession and control:

- ownership is where a person is not legally accountable to anyone else for the use of the property:
- possession is where a person is only accountable to the owner for the use of the property; and
- control is where a person is only accountable to two people for the use of the property.

So if A buys a car for cash, A will be the owner. If A then lends the car to B Ltd (a company), B Ltd will have possession. C, an employee of B Ltd then uses the car and has control. If C uses the car in an unauthorised way, C will steal the car from A and B Ltd. This means that it is possible to steal one's own property.

In R v Turner, the owner removed his car from the forecourt of a garage where it had been left for collection after repair. He intended to avoid paying the bill. There was an appropriation of the car because it had been physically removed but there were two issues to be decided:

- did the car "belong to another"? The garage had a lien i.e. a "proprietary right or interest" in the car as security for the unpaid bill and this gave the garage a better right than the owner to possess the car at the relevant time.
- what was the relevance of Turner's belief that he could not steal his own property? The defence of mistake of law only applies if the defendant honestly believes that he has a right in law to act in the given way. Generalised and non-specific beliefs about what the law might permit are not a defence.

===== 5. 'With the intention of permanently depriving the other of it' =====
Section 6 "with the intent to permanently deprive the other of it" is sufficiently flexible to include situations where the property is later returned.

Alternative verdict

The offense created by section 12(1) of the Theft Act 1968 (TWOC) is available an alternative verdict on an indictment for theft.

Visiting forces

Theft is an offence against property for the purposes of section 3 of the Visiting Forces Act 1952.

Mode of trial and sentence

Theft is triable either way. A person guilty of theft is liable, on conviction on indictment, to imprisonment for a term not exceeding seven years, or on summary conviction to imprisonment for a term not exceeding six months, or to a fine not exceeding the prescribed sum, or to both.

Aggravated theft

The only offence of aggravated theft is robbery, contrary to section 8 of the Theft Act 1968.

Stolen goods

For the purposes of the provisions of the Theft Act 1968 which relate to stolen goods, goods obtain in England or Wales or elsewhere by blackmail or fraud are regarded as stolen, and the words "steal", "theft" and "thief" are construed accordingly.

Sections 22 to 24 and 26 to 28 of the Theft Act 1968 contain references to stolen goods.

Handling stolen goods

The offence of handling stolen goods, contrary to section 22(1) of the Theft Act 1968, can only be committed "otherwise than in the course of stealing".

Similar or associated offences

According to its title, the Theft Act 1968 revises the law as to theft and similar or associated offences. See also the Theft Act 1978.

==== Northern Ireland ====
In Northern Ireland, theft is a statutory offence, created by section 1 of the Theft Act (Northern Ireland) 1969.

=== United States ===
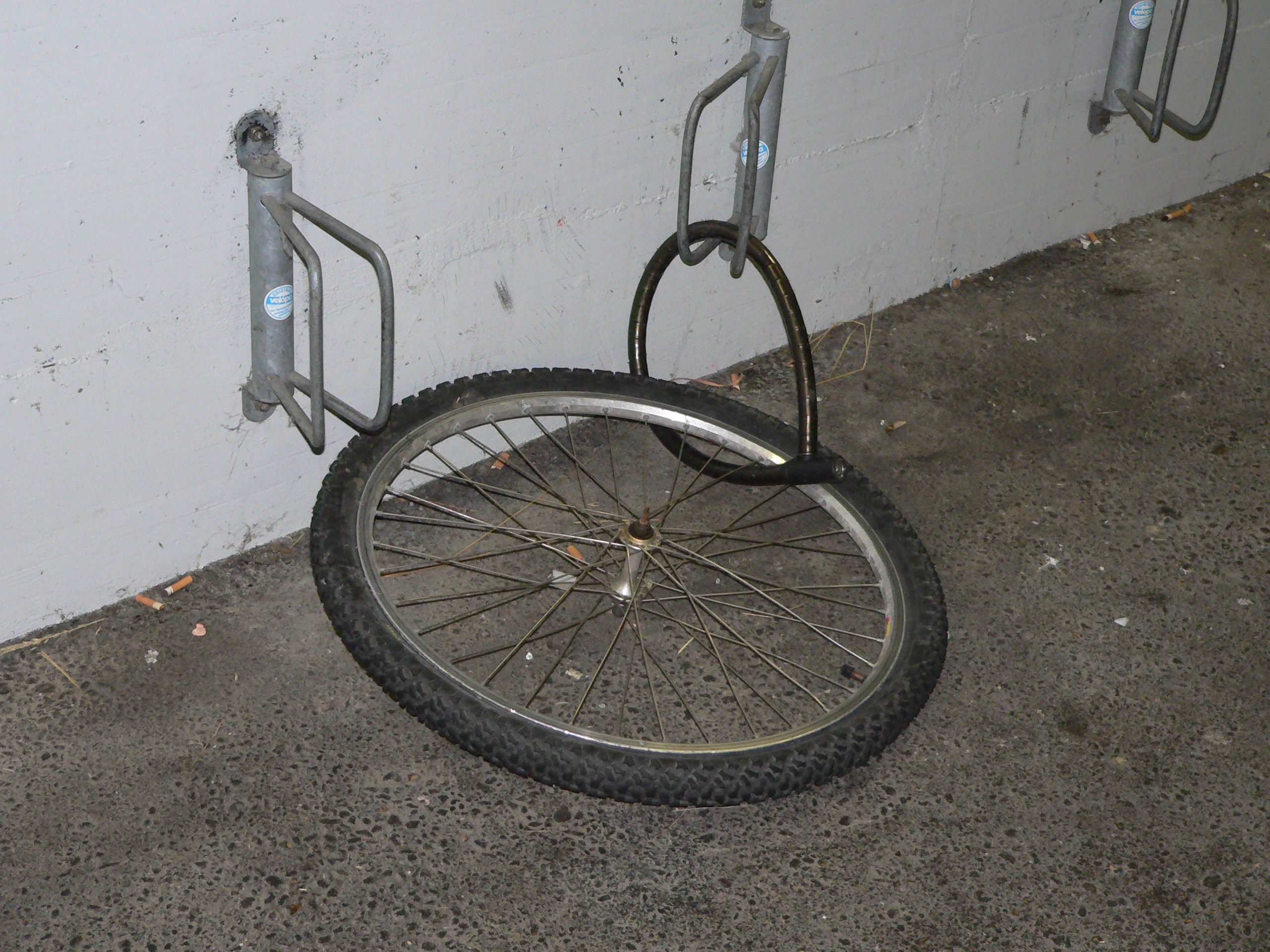
Bicycles can occasionally be stolen, even when locked up, by removing the wheel or cutting the lock that holds them.

In the United States, crimes must be prosecuted in the jurisdiction in which they occurred. Although federal and state jurisdiction may overlap, even when a criminal act violates both state and federal law, in most cases only the most serious offenses are prosecuted at the federal level.

The federal government has criminalised certain narrow categories of theft that directly affect federal agencies or interstate commerce. The Model Penal Code, promulgated by the American Law Institute to help state legislatures update and standardise their laws, includes categories of theft by unlawful taking or by unlawfully disposing of property, theft by deception (fraud), theft by extortion, theft by failure to take measures to return lost or mislaid or mistakenly delivered property, theft by receipt of stolen property, theft by failing to make agreed disposition of received funds, and theft of services.

Although many U.S. states have retained larceny as the primary offense, some have now adopted theft provisions.

Grand theft, also called grand larceny, is a term used throughout the United States designating theft that is large in magnitude or serious in potential penological consequences. Grand theft is contrasted with petty theft, also called petit theft, that is of smaller magnitude or lesser seriousness.

Theft laws, including the distinction between grand theft and petty theft for cases falling within its jurisdiction, vary by state. This distinction is established by statute, as are the penological consequences. Most commonly, statutes establishing the distinction between grand theft and petty theft do so on the basis of the value of the money or property taken by the thief or lost by the victim, with the dollar threshold for grand theft varying from state to state. Most commonly, the penological consequences of the distinction include the significant one that grand theft can be treated as a felony, while petty theft is generally treated as a misdemeanor.

In some states, grand theft of a vehicle may be charged as "grand theft auto" (see motor vehicle theft for more information).

Repeat offenders who continue to steal may become subject to life imprisonment in certain states.

Sometimes the federal anti-theft-of-government-property law 18 U.S.C. § 640 is used to prosecute cases where the Espionage Act would otherwise be involved, the theory being that by retaining sensitive information, the defendant has taken a 'thing of value' from the government. For examples, see the Amerasia case and United States v. Manning.

==== Alabama ====
When stolen property exceeds the amount of $500 it is a felony offense. If property is less than $500, then it is a Class A misdemeanor. Unlike some other states, shoplifting is not defined by a separate statute but falls under the state's general theft statute.

==== Alaska ====
The Alaska State Code does not use the terms grand theft or grand larceny. However, it specifies that theft of property valued at more than $1,000 is a felony whereas thefts of lesser amounts are misdemeanors. The felony categories (class 1 and class 2 theft) also include theft of firearms; property taken from the person of another; vessel or aircraft safety or survival equipment; and of access devices.

==== Arizona ====
Felony theft is committed when the value of the stolen property exceeds $1000. Regardless of the value of the item, if it is a firearm or an animal taken for the purpose of animal fighting, then the theft is a Class 6 Felony.

==== California ====
The Theft Act of 1927 consolidated a variety of common law crimes into theft. The state now distinguishes between two types of theft, grand theft and petty theft. The older crimes of embezzlement, larceny, and stealing, and any preexisting references to them now fall under the theft statute.

There are a number of criminal statutes in the California Penal Code defining grand theft in different amounts. Grand theft generally consists of the theft of something of value over $950 (including money, labor or property but is lower with respect to various specified property), Theft is also considered grand theft when more than $250 in crops or marine life forms are stolen, "when the property is taken from the person of another," or when the property stolen is an automobile, farm animal, or firearm.

Petty theft is the default category for all other thefts.

Grand theft is punishable by up to a year in jail or prison, and may be charged (depending upon the circumstances) as a misdemeanor or felony, while petty theft is a misdemeanor punishable by a fine or imprisonment not exceeding six months in jail or both.

==== Florida ====
In general, any property taken that carries a value of more than $750 can be considered grand theft in certain circumstances.

==== Georgia ====
In Georgia, when a theft offense involves property valued at $500 or less, the crime is punishable as a misdemeanor. Any theft of property determined to be exceeding $500 may be treated as grand theft and charged as a felony.

==== Hawaii ====
Theft in the first or second degree is a felony. Theft in the first degree means theft above $20,000 or of a firearm or explosive; or theft over $300 during a declared emergency. Theft in the second degree means theft above $750, theft from the person of another, or agricultural products over $100 or aquacultural products from an enclosed property.

==== Illinois ====
Theft is a felony if the value of the property exceeds $300 or the property is stolen from the person of another. Thresholds at $10,000, $100,000, and $500,000 determine how severe the punishment can be. The location from which property was stolen is also a factor in sentencing.

==== Kentucky ====
KRS 514.030 states that theft by unlawful taking or disposition is generally a Class A misdemeanor unless the items stolen are a firearm, anhydrous ammonia, a controlled substance valued at less than $10,000 or any other item or combination of items valued $500 or higher and less than $10,000 in which case the theft is a Class D felony. Theft of items valued at $10,000 or higher and less than $1,000,000 is a Class C felony. Theft of items valued at $1,000,000 or more is a Class B felony, as is first offense theft of anhydrous ammonia for the express purpose of manufacturing methamphetamines in violation of KRS 218A.1432. In the latter case, subsequent offenses are a Class A felony.

==== Massachusetts ====
In Massachusetts, theft may generally be charged as a felony if the value of stolen property is greater than $250.

==== Missouri ====
Stealing is a felony if the value of stolen property exceeds $500. It is also a felony if "The actor physically takes the property appropriated from the person of the victim" or the stolen property is a vehicle, legal document, credit card, firearm, explosive, U.S. flag on display, livestock animal, fish with value exceeding $75, captive wildlife, controlled substance, or anhydrous ammonia. Stealing in excess of $25,000 is usually a class B felony (sentence: 5–15 years), while any other felony stealing (not including the felonies of burglary or robbery) that does not involve chemicals is a class C felony (sentence: up to 7 years). Non-felony stealing is a class A misdemeanor (sentence: up to 1 year).

==== New York ====
Grand larceny consists of stealing property with a value exceeding $1000; or stealing a public record, secret scientific material, firearm, credit or debit card, ammonia, telephone with service, or motor vehicle or religious item with value exceeding $100; or stealing from the person of another or by extortion or from an ATM. The degree of grand larceny is increased if the theft was from an ATM, through extortion involving fear, or involved a value exceeding the thresholds of $3,000, $50,000, or $1,000,000.

==== Vermont ====
Grand Larceny: Value of goods exceed $900 (13 V.S.A. § 2501)

==== Virginia ====
Grand Larceny: Value of goods exceed $1000 (Virginia Code § 18.2-95)

==== Washington State ====
Theft of goods valued between $750 and $5000 is second-degree theft, a Class C felony. Theft of goods valued above $5000, of a search-and-rescue dog on duty, of public records from a public office or official, of metal wire from a utility, or of an access device, is a Class B felony, as is theft of a motor vehicle or a firearm.

=== West Indies ===
In the British West Indies, especially Grenada, there have been a spate of large-scale thefts of tons of sand from beaches. Both Grenada and Jamaica are considering increasing fines and jail time for the thefts.

== Statistics ==
The following are countries with their respective rates of theft per 100,000 people, according to the United Nations in last available year. Such statistics are difficult to compare usefully because of large variations in the proportion of thefts reported to police, and how reported crimes are statistically compiled.

Country	Reported annual per 100,000	Year
Albania	71.7	2024
Algeria	28.6	2024
Andorra	1449.3	2015
Antigua and Barbuda	1180.5	2024
Argentina	823.9	2024
Armenia	214.9	2024
Australia	2475.4	2024
Austria	1184.9	2024
Azerbaijan	21.8	2024
Bahamas	447.3	2022
Bahrain	678.0	2008
Bangladesh	8.9	2006
Barbados	398.8	2022
Belarus	427.8	2014
Belgium	1669.0	2024
Belize	24.1	2022
Bermuda	2130.9	2016
Bhutan	40.8	2020
Bolivia	27.2	2020
Bosnia and Herzegovina	94.4	2024
Botswana	1365.3	2014
Brazil	1045.1	2024
Brunei Darussalam	311.5	2006
Bulgaria	364.2	2024
Burundi	7.5	2014
Cabo Verde	667.9	2018
Cameroon	71.6	2015
Canada	1403.8	2024
Chile	604.2	2022
Colombia	804.0	2024
Costa Rica	372.5	2024
Croatia	299.9	2024
Cyprus	46.5	2024
Czech Republic	300.6	2024
Denmark	2616.2	2024
Dominica	1338.3	2024
Dominican Republic	25.1	2022
Ecuador	83.4	2024
Egypt	95.6	2011
El Salvador	146.0	2022
England and Wales	2694.9	2018
Estonia	738.6	2024
Eswatini	1943.0	2004
Finland	2271.5	2024
France	1972.4	2024
Georgia	252.0	2014
Germany	1358.8	2024
Greece	626.4	2024
Grenada	2320.5	2022
Guatemala	264.8	2024
Guinea	14.0	2007
Guinea-Bissau	57.3	2014
Guyana	315.5	2024
Honduras	24.3	2024
Hong Kong	244.5	2022
Hungary	623.7	2024
Iceland	977.1	2024
India	28.8	2013
Indonesia	22.6	2024
Iran	156.3	2004
Iraq (Central)	0.3	2020
Ireland	1359.3	2024
Israel	480.9	2024
Italy	1542.5	2024
Jamaica	4.1	2024
Japan	370.5	2024
Jordan	101.2	2024
Kazakhstan	1155.2	2015
Kenya	27.1	2022
Kosovo	241.2	2020
Kuwait	290.8	2009
Kyrgyzstan	235.2	2020
Latvia	651.9	2024
Lebanon	386.7	2015
Lesotho	227.0	2009
Liechtenstein	642.1	2024
Lithuania	413.3	2024
Luxembourg	2489.5	2022
Macau	256.0	2024
Madagascar	0.9	2015
Malaysia	140.5	2006
Maldives	1670.5	2013
Malta	784.8	2024
Mauritius	711.0	2011
Mexico	220.2	2024
Moldova	143.6	2024
Monaco	1116.0	2016
Mongolia	219.4	2024
Montenegro	56.4	2024
Morocco	90.8	2022
Mozambique	21.2	2009
Myanmar	5.6	2022
Nepal	4.6	2016
Netherlands	1309.6	2024
New Zealand	2645.9	2020
Nicaragua	182.2	2010
Nigeria	13.3	2013
North Macedonia	441.6	2024
Northern Ireland	1158.3	2023
Norway	2089.9	2024
Oman	45.7	2022
Pakistan	166.4	2024
Palestine	59.6	2024
Panama	330.0	2024
Paraguay	502.5	2024
Peru	406.7	2022
Philippines	23.7	2018
Poland	236.8	2024
Portugal	737.2	2024
Puerto Rico	241.8	2024
Qatar	107.2	2006
Romania	269.8	2024
Russia	464.2	2020
Saint Kitts and Nevis	877.4	2024
Saint Lucia	815.5	2022
Scotland	1488.2	2023
Senegal	17.2	2015
Serbia	206.7	2024
Sierra Leone	178.2	2008
Singapore	138.2	2024
Slovakia	140.7	2024
Slovenia	1229.9	2024
Solomon Islands	172.6	2008
South Korea	355.1	2024
Spain	457.5	2024
Sri Lanka	26.9	2018
St. Vincent and Grenadines	850.8	2024
Sudan	223.3	2008
Suriname	479.6	2022
Sweden	2497.1	2024
Switzerland	1975.0	2024
Syria	16.6	2018
São Tomé and Príncipe	10.8	2011
Tajikistan	46.9	2011
Tanzania	0.3	2015
Thailand	79.5	2024
Trinidad and Tobago	109.3	2020
Turkey	98.3	2024
Turkmenistan	27.8	2006
Uganda	112.2	2016
Ukraine	269.9	2020
United Arab Emirates	47.0	2022
United States of America	1458.3	2022
Uruguay	3230.8	2024
Vatican City	0.0	2024
Zimbabwe	705.7	2008

== See also ==
- Anti-theft system
- Asset management (corporate theft prevention)
- Confidence trick
- Credit card fraud
- Crime statistics
- Dishonesty
- Fence (criminal)
- Force-initiation
- Fraud
- Gentleman thief
- High-trust and low-trust societies
- Larceny
- Money laundering
- Organized crime
- Pickpocketing
- Package pilferage
- Plagiarism
- Property is theft!
- Secret profit
- Skimming (casinos)
- Taxation as theft
- Theft Act
- Usufruct
- White-collar crime

Specific forms of theft and other related offences

- Art theft
- Attention theft
- Bank robbery
- Bandwidth theft
- Bloody Code
- Brandjacking
- Carjacking
- Computer crime
- Confidence trick
- Dine and dash
- Economic Espionage Act of 1996
- Embezzlement
- Espionage
- Extortion
- Identity theft
- Kidnapping
- Laptop theft
- Metal theft
- Motor vehicle theft
- Organized retail crime
- Package pilferage
- Phishing
- Piracy
- Plagiarism
- Quackery
- Receipt of stolen property
- Ripoff
- Sperm theft
- Street sign theft
- Tax evasion
- Theft of services
- Theft by finding
- Electricity theft
- Wage theft
