= R v Hinks =

- Court: House of Lords
- Full case name: Regina v Hinks
- Decided: 26 October 2000
- Citation: [2000] UKHL 53; [2000] 3 WLR 1590
- Cases cited: Bell v Lever Brothers Ltd [1932] AC 161, Black-Clawson International Ltd v. Papierwerke Waldhof-Aschaffenburg AG [1975] AC 591, Dobson v. General Accident Fire and Life Assurance Corpn plc [1990] 1 QB 274, R v. Fritschy [1985] Crim LR 745, R v. Ghosh [1982] QB 1053, R v. Gomez [1993] AC 442, R v. Kendrick and Hopkins [1997] 2 Cr App R 524, R v Lawrence [1971] 2 All ER 1253, R v. McPherson [1973] Crim LR 191, R v. Mazo [1997] 2 Cr App R 518, R v. Morris [1984] AC 320, R v. Preddy [1996] AC 815, R v. Skipp [1975] Crim LR 114, R v. Walker [1984] Crim LR 112.
- Legislation cited: Theft Act 1968, ss. 1-3.

Court membership
- Judges sitting: Lord Slynn of Hadley, Lord Jauncey of Tullichettle, Lord Steyn, Lord Hutton, Lord Hobhouse of Woodborough.

Keywords
- Crime - Theft - Gift - Person of low intelligence giving large sums of money and television set to defendant - Defendant charged with theft - Whether donee acquiring indefeasible title guilty of theft - Whether "appropriation" of property belonging to another - Theft Act 1968, ss 1(1), 3(1)

R v Hinks [2000] UKHL 53 is an English case heard by the House of Lords on appeal from the Court of Appeal of England and Wales. The case concerned the interpretation of the word "appropriates" in section 1 the Theft Act 1968.

The case established that in the English law of theft, the acquisition of an indefeasible title to property is capable of amounting to an appropriation of property belonging to another for the purposes of the Theft Act 1968. Therefore, a person can appropriate property belonging to another where the other person makes him an indefeasible gift of property, retaining no proprietary interest or any right to resume or recover any proprietary interest in the property. Property can be appropriated albeit the thief has the owner's consent.

== Facts ==
In 1996, 38-year-old Karen Maria Hinks was friendly with 53-year-old John Dolphin, who was of limited intelligence. His IQ was assessed in the range of 70 to 80. Hinks described herself as his main carer. Between April-November 1996 Dolphin withdrew £300 from his building society account almost every day, totalling around £60,000, which was deposited into Hinks' account. Consequently he lost most of his savings. In 1997 Hinks was charged with six counts of theft and one count of false accounting.

During the trial, Dolphin was professionally evaluated as being naïve and trusting and having no idea of the value of his assets or the ability to calculate their value. However, it was acknowledged that he would be capable of making a gift and understood the concept of ownership. Dolphin was also found to be capable of making the decision to divest himself of money, but it was considered unlikely that he could make this decision alone. Notably, staff of the building society claimed in evidence that Hinks would do the majority of the talking during the withdrawals and would interrupt Dolphin if he tried to speak. Police gave further evidence that Hinks denied having any money from Dolphin except for one cheque which she described as a loan.

The defendant's argument was that the moneys were a gift from Dolphin, and that given that the title in the moneys had passed to her, there could be no theft.

In his summing up, Judge Warner directed the jury that they had to determine whether Hinks had dishonestly appropriated the money. Dishonesty was defined as per the Ghosh test which was applicable at the time. The judge highlighted that if the jury were to accept that the money was a gift, they must consider whether an ordinary person would view acceptance of the gift as dishonest and whether Hinks knew that an ordinary person would view her acceptance of the gift as dishonest.

On November 11 1997, at Wolverhampton Crown Court, Hinks was convicted of five counts of theft, and pleaded guilty to false accounting. She was sentenced to 18 months imprisonment concurrently on each count of theft and six months concurrently on the count of false accounting, furthermore she was ordered to pay £19,000 compensation to Dolphin.

She appealed to the Court of Appeal on the grounds, among other things, that since she acquired a perfectly valid gift, there could not be an appropriation. The Court of Appeal rejected this ground of appeal, stating that the fact there has been made a valid gift is irrelevant to the question of whether there has been an appropriation. Indeed, it held that a gift may be evidence of an appropriation. Rose LJ gave the following reasons:

- Section 1 of the Theft Act 1968 does not require that there has been no gift, but merely that there has been an appropriation.
- Such an approach would be inconsistent with the cases of Lawrence v Metropolitan Police Commissioner [1972] A.C. 626 and R v. Gomez [1993] A.C. 442.
- The state of mind of the donor is irrelevant, as per Lord Browne-Wilkinson (with whom Lord Jauncey agreed) in R v. Gomez [1993] A.C. 442. It was said that the authorities maintain a strong distinction between the separate ingredients of dishonesty and appropriation.

In essence, appropriation could occur even though the owner consented.

Hinks appealed to the House of Lords on the question of whether a person can “appropriate” property belonging to another where the other person makes him an indefeasible gift of property, retaining no proprietary interest or any right to resume or recover any proprietary interest in the property.

== Judgment ==
The court ruled by a majority of 3–2 in favour of the respondent; that the acquisition of an indefeasible title to property is capable of amounting to an appropriation of property belonging to another for the purposes of the Theft Act 1968.

Lord Steyn gave the sole substantive judgment for the majority (with whom Lord Slynn of Hadley and Lord Jauncey of Tullichettle agreed).

Lord Hutton and Lord Hobhouse of Woodborough gave dissenting judgments.

=== Majority ===
Lord Steyn stated that the starting point must be the words of the Theft Act 1968, as interpreted by the House of Lords in previous decisions. He cited three House of Lords cases:

- Lawrence v Metropolitan Police Commissioner [1972] A.C. 626, which held that in a prosecution for theft it is unnecessary to prove that the taking was without the owner's consent, on the basis that a taxi driver deliberately overcharged an Italian student.
- R v Morris [1984] A.C. 320, in which Lord Roskill's judgment conflicted with that of Lawrence v Metropolitan Police Commissioner. He stated that "the concept of appropriation in my view involves not an act expressly or impliedly authorised by the owner but an act by way of adverse interference with or usurpation of those rights." This disparity was resolved in the following case:
- R v Gomez [1993] A.C. 442, where the court held by a majority (Lord Lowry dissenting) that there can be an appropriation where that which is alleged to be stolen passes to the defendant with the consent of the owner, but that consent has been obtained by a false representation. The court added that such a passing of property need not involve an element of adverse interference with, or usurpation of, some right of the owner. Lord Roskill's comments in R v Morris (cited above) were disapproved.

Lord Steyn noted that the case law interprets section 3(1) of the Theft Act 1968 by treating "appropriation" as a neutral word comprehending "any assumption by a person of the rights of an owner". In other words, it is immaterial whether the act was done with the owner's consent or authority.

Lord Steyn then turned to the appellant's arguments. Counsel had argued that there could be no appropriation unless the other party retained some proprietary right or a right to recover the property, and that the mens rea of dishonesty and intention to permanently deprive were sufficient to filter cases in which the conduct should not be regarded as theft. Steyn was unconvinced by these arguments and maintained that the House of Lords had not overlooked the consequences in its previous decisions, that the court had intentionally accepted a broader interpretation. His Lordship was motivated by a concern that if the law is restated by adopting a narrower definition of appropriation, the outcome is likely to place beyond the reach of the criminal law dishonest persons who should be found guilty of theft.

Counsel for the defendant also highlighted the conflict between civil and criminal law that would result from a broad interpretation of the word "appropriates", along with the "grotesque and absurd" results that such a decision would allow. Lord Steyn, however, accepted that in a practical world there would always be a disharmony between the two systems and noted that in this disharmony it is not necessarily the criminal law that is defective. He therefore declined to depart from the rulings in R v Gomez and R v Lawrence.

Lord Steyn asserted that the mental requirements of the law of theft offer adequate protection from the injustice that would otherwise result from a broad interpretation of the word "appropriates".

For these reasons, Lord Steyn rejected the appellant's counsel's argument that the law as expounded in R v Gomez and R v Lawrence must be qualified to say that there can be no appropriation unless the other party (the owner) retains some proprietary interest, or the right to resume or recover some proprietary interest, in the property. He also declined to accept the counsel's alternative argument that "appropriates" should be interpreted as if the word "unlawfully" preceded it.

Having decided that the elements of dishonesty and appropriation must be considered separately, and that dishonesty had not been basis for the appeal, Lord Steyn declined to comment on the trial judge's directions as to dishonesty.

=== Dissent ===
Lord Hutton gave one of the two dissenting judgments. The other was made by Lord Hobhouse.

Lord Hutton was in agreement with Lord Steyn as to whether there had been an appropriation. Although not directly relevant to the issue put before the court, he then went on to consider the element of dishonesty as the House is not confined to the question of the appeal and may consider other points in the interests of justice.

He held that it was contrary to common sense that a person who receives property as a gift could be said to be acting dishonestly, regardless of the moral reprehensibility of accepting it. He argued that this was recognized by Section 2(1)(b) of the Theft Act 1968, which states that a person’s appropriation of property belonging to another is not to be regarded as dishonest if he appropriates the property in the belief that he would have the other’s consent if the other knew of the appropriation and the circumstances of it. Consequently, said Lord Hutton, a person's appropriation of property belonging to another should not be regarded as dishonest if the other person actually gives the property to him. His Lordship drew further support for this argument from Viscount Dilhorne’s judgment in R v Lawrence, and that of Pill LJ in R v Mazo [1997] 2 Cr App R 518.

Lord Hutton considered whether a defendant should be guilty by virtue of contractual vitiating factors unknown to him at the time, which render the contract void or voidable, and which have the effect that there is no valid transfer of property to the defendant. While his Lordship agreed that such contractual principles should be confined to their own spheres and that criminal liability should not hinge upon them, he stated that where the mental incapacity of the donor is concerned it is necessary for the jury to consider that matter. He held that the defendant could only be guilty if (1) the donor did not have the mental capacity to make a gift and (2) the donee knew of this incapacity. He was also of the view that the conclusions of the court in R v Mazo and R v. Kendrick and Hopkins [1997] 2 Cr App R 524 could be reconciled with this principle.

Lord Hutton held that allowing the acceptance of a valid gift in these circumstances to be dishonest would also be wrong since it would link the issue of mental incapacity to what ordinary and decent people would regard as dishonest. He thought that these two components should be separate and distinct: if the donor is found to be mentally capable then the defendant is not guilty, as there has been a valid gift; however, if the donor is found to be mentally incapable so that there is not a valid contract and transfer of property, then the defendant should only be guilty if what the defendant did was dishonest by the standards of ordinary decent people and the defendant realised this. He held that the same principle should apply even where the vitiating factor was something else: undue influence or duress, for example.

Lord Hutton's key point was that acceptance of a valid gift could not be dishonest, and the jury therefore ought to have been directed to decide the validity of the gift rather than to consider the Ghosh test.

Lord Hutton therefore stated that he would allow the appeal and held that their convictions should be quashed.

Lord Hobhouse gave full dissent of his own, with particular support for the proposition that "dishonestly appropriates" is a composite phrase and its constituent parts cannot be determined independently. While even Lord Hutton agreed that the certified question should be decided in the affirmative (differing only on if it was appropriate to consider whether the jury was misdirected as to dishonesty), Lord Hobhouse was the only judge to decide the certified question in the negative.

== Significance ==
The House of Lords' decision in Hinks was widely criticised by academics for a variety of reasons.

Arguably the courts since Lawrence operated under a misapprehension as to the differences between the Larceny Act 1916 and the Theft Act 1968. That being that the Larceny Act recognised two offences; taking and carrying away without consent, and conversion. The Theft Act was said to be derived from the latter of the two, of which "without consent of the owner" was an element.

Lord Steyn's references to Gomez were criticised on the basis that the facts in that case established a voidable contract and not an indefeasible or valid title to the property. Whether the gifts in Hinks were indefeasible was questioned on the basis that the facts suggest some degree of coercion and the jury received no direction as to the validty of the gifts despite capacity forming part of the prosecution's case. R v Mazo, a case with exceptionally similar facts save for that the victim was held to be mentally incapable, was suggested as the correct decision on these matters and Hinks the wrong one.

Some 22 years on, and in view of the decisions of Ivey v Genting Casinos and R v Barton and Booth, the decision in Hinks was defended on the basis that conduct of Hinks was plainly dishonest as she coerced Dolphin into giving her money. This point was made in response to concerns that the aforementioned developments relating to the definition of dishonesty in criminal law would lead to wrongful convictions due to a shift from a subjective test to an objective one.

== See also ==
- English criminal law
- List of judgments of the House of Lords
- Theft
