= Possession of stolen goods =

Category of crime

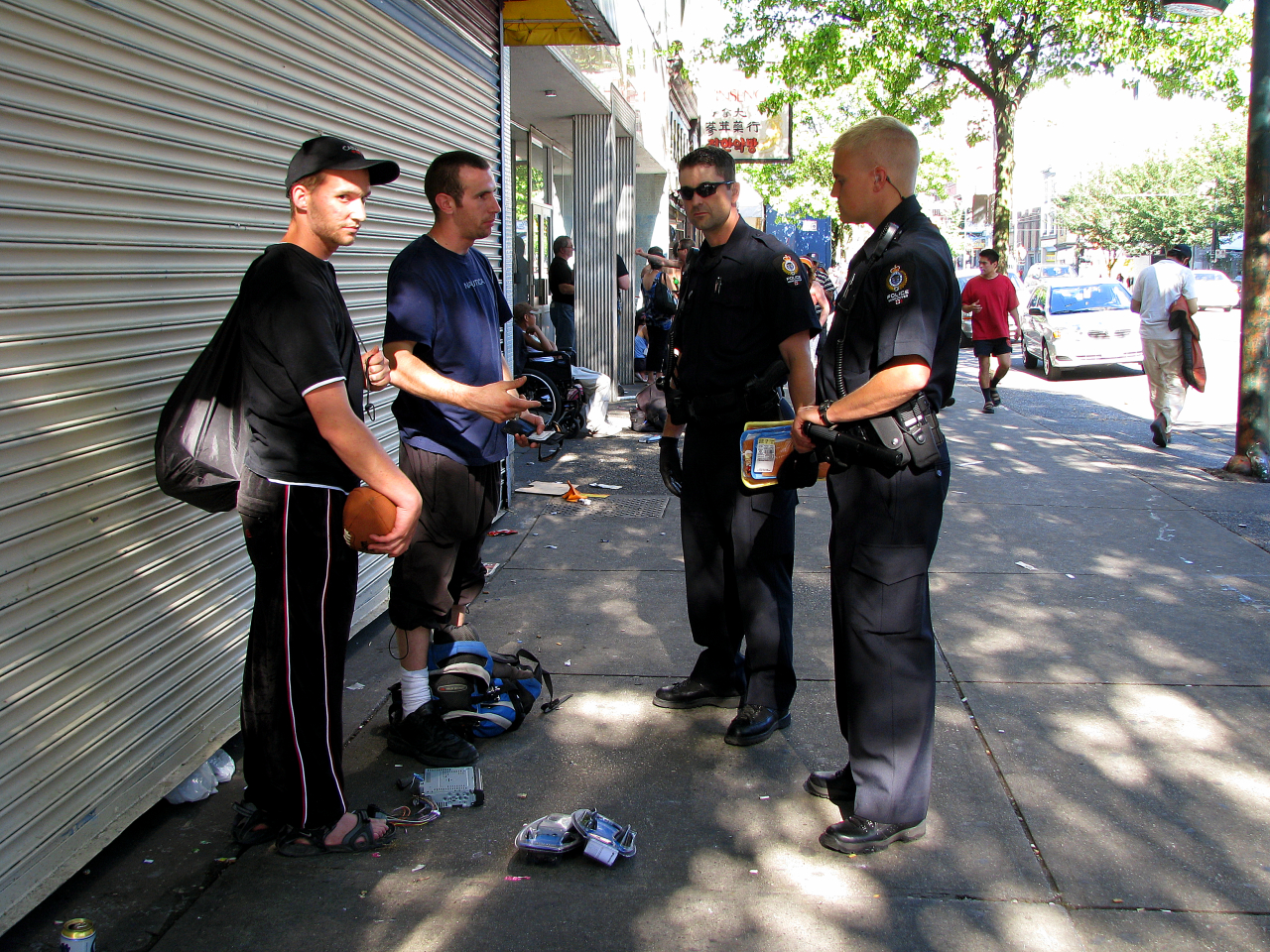
Officers of the Vancouver Police Department checking for stolen goods at a flea market

Possession of stolen goods is a crime in which an individual has bought, been given, or acquired stolen goods.

In many jurisdictions, if an individual has accepted possession of goods (or property) and knew they were stolen, then the individual may be charged with a crime, depending on the value of the stolen goods, and the goods are returned to the original owner. If the individual did not know the goods were stolen, then the goods are returned to the owner and the individual is not prosecuted. However, it can be difficult to prove or disprove a suspect's knowledge that the goods were stolen.

== Nature of offence by country ==
=== Canada ===
The Criminal Code specifies three offences:

- Possession of property obtained by crime (s. 354)
- Trafficking in property obtained by crime (ss. 355.2)
- Possession of property obtained by crime for the purposes of trafficking (ss. 355.4)

The basic definition for the possession offence (which is almost identical in wording for the trafficking offences) is as follows:

354. (1) Every one commits an offence who has in his possession any property or thing or any proceeds of any property or thing knowing that all or part of the property or thing or of the proceeds was obtained by or derived directly or indirectly from

(a) the commission in Canada of an offence punishable by indictment; or
(b) an act or omission anywhere that, if it had occurred in Canada, would have constituted an offence punishable by indictment.

If the value of the property is greater than $5,000, the maximum punishment on indictment is 10 years for possession only, and 14 years if related to trafficking. Otherwise, the maximum on indictment is two years and five years respectively, or alternatively punishment by summary conviction. (ss. 355 and 355.5)

=== United Kingdom ===
Handling stolen goods is the name of a statutory offence in England and Wales and Northern Ireland. It takes place after a theft or other dishonest acquisition is completed and may be committed by a fence or other person who helps the thief to realise the value of the stolen goods. (This replaces the offence of "receiving stolen goods" under section 33 of the Larceny Act 1916.)

==== England and Wales ====
This offence is created by section 22(1) of the Theft Act 1968, which provides:

A person handles stolen goods if (otherwise than in the course of stealing), knowing or believing them to be stolen goods he dishonestly receives the goods, or dishonestly undertakes or assists in their retention, removal, disposal or realisation by or for the benefit of another person, or if he arranges to do so.

Stolen goods: This term means property stolen anywhere, as long as the theft amounted to an offence where committed. It includes any proceeds of that property, including money for which it has been sold, and anything bought with those proceeds. However, property which has been returned to the original owner, or otherwise lawful custody, is no longer regarded as stolen, by section 24(3). This may create difficulties, as in Haughton v Smith. It is not necessary that the property be "stolen" in a limited sense; section 24(4) of the Act specifically extends the scope to property obtained by fraud or blackmail. However, it is also implicit in the definition of offences such as burglary or robbery that handling may apply to the proceeds of these offences.

Dealing: The offence of handling is drafted widely enough to criminalise any dishonest dealing with property that has been come by dishonestly; for example, the original thief may also be convicted of a subsequent handling if the thief later arranges its sale. A codification of the methods of dealing has been suggested as

1. receiving stolen goods,
2. arranging to receive them,
3. undertaking the keeping, removing, disposing of, or realisation of stolen goods by or for the benefit of another person, or helping with any of those things, or
4. arranging to do any of the things in (3).

This makes the actus reus of handling very wide. For example, in R v Kanwar, a man had brought stolen goods into the marital home, and his wife, the defendant, had lied to the police; it was held that this constituted "assisting in the retention" of those goods.

Knowledge or belief: The accused's knowledge or belief as to the nature of the goods is crucial, but has been a constant source of interpretive problems. Either may be based on what the thief says or some other positive information, but belief is less than knowledge and more than mere suspicion. In R v Hall [1985] 81 Cr App R 260, it was held that, per Boreham, J.,

Belief ... is something short of knowledge. It may be said to be the state of mind of a person who says to himself, "I cannot say I know for certain that these goods are stolen, but there can be no other reasonable conclusion in the light of all the circumstances, in the light of all that I have heard and seen."

He went on to distinguish the case where a defendant has said

"I suspect that these goods may be stolen, but it may be on the other hand that they are not"

The situation is further complicated by the concept of recklessness or wilful blindness to the circumstances; either will be treated as a belief that the goods are stolen. Thus, suspicion will be converted into belief when the facts are so obvious that belief may safely be imputed. So if the defendant bought goods in a pub or a dark alley for a fraction of their true value and it is clear that identification marks or serial numbers have been erased, denial of belief by the defendant would not be credible.

Dishonestly: The mens rea of the offence is the same as for theft (see Ivey v Genting Casinos [2017] UKSC 67).

There was at one time an issue of impossibility in that defendants may be dishonest and intend to handle goods (which they believe to be stolen) but which are not in fact stolen. The House of Lords ruled in Haughton v. Smith (1973) that where goods previously stolen have been reduced into lawful possession, not only can they not be "handled", but there can be no attempt to handle them. However, since then, section 1 of the Criminal Attempts Act 1981 confirms that such a defendant can be convicted.

Laundering is an offence under ss. 327/9 and 340(3)(b) Proceeds of Crime Act 2002 and the distinction between this and handling depends on whether the defendant's intention was to launder the proceeds of crime or merely to assist a thief. Laundering covers large amounts of money in a series of transactions over time when the defendant knows or suspects that the assets which he has concealed, acquired, used, possessed, or in respect of which they have entered into an arrangement which they know or suspect facilitates the acquisition, retention, use, or control of criminal property by or on behalf of another person, are the proceeds of criminal conduct (compare money laundering).

Section 23 of the 1968 Act creates an offence of "advertising rewards for the return of stolen goods". This prohibits public advertising for the return of such goods that state that "no questions will be asked", or that offer immunity from prosecution to the returner, or that state that monies paid for the goods will be reimbursed. This is a summary offence but is rarely prosecuted.

Handling stolen goods is triable either way. A person guilty of handling stolen goods is liable, on conviction on indictment, to imprisonment for a term not exceeding fourteen years, or on summary conviction to imprisonment for a term not exceeding six months, or to a fine not exceeding the prescribed sum, or to both.

The wording of Section 22 actually creates eighteen ways in which "handling" may be committed, This may create a problem for prosecutors in that Rule 7 of the Criminal Procedure Rules 2005, and Rule 7 of the Indictments Rules 1971, provide that only a single offence may be charged in one information (in the Magistrates' Court) or in one count of an indictment (in the Crown Court). It can also be difficult to determine the meaning of "otherwise than in the course of stealing"; it was decided in R v Hale that the "appropriation" in theft may be a continuing act, so it may be difficult to determine whether a theft has been completed.

Apart from the apparent difficulties of specifying a charge that does not offend against the rule against duplicity, it has been said that "in practice almost anything a person does with stolen goods may be classified as a handling".

Section 27(3) of the Theft Act 1968 introduces a rare exception to the rule against admissibility of previous criminal conduct in the case of this offence. Evidence may be adduced (but only if handling is the only charge faced by the defendant) that the defendant (a) has been involved in similar conduct within the previous twelve months, and (b) has a previous conviction for handling within five years. This is to counter repeated defences of "innocent dealing" as may be put forward by dishonest pawnbrokers. If the defendant is facing other charges, evidence of previous bad character may be admissible under Section 98 of the Criminal Justice Act 2003.

==== Northern Ireland ====
This offence is created by section 21(1) of the Theft Act (Northern Ireland) 1969.

==== Scotland ====
In Scotland, this crime is called reset. It includes property that was taken by theft or robbery as well as property taken by breaches of trust including embezzlement, fraud, and willful imposition.

=== Republic of Ireland ===
The offence of handling stolen property is created by section 17(1) of the Criminal Justice (Theft and Fraud Offences) Act 2001.

=== United States ===
In the United States, receipt of stolen property is a federal crime under 18 U.S.C. § 2315, and is defined as knowingly receiving, concealing, or disposing of stolen property with a value of at least $5,000 such that it also constitutes interstate commerce (i.e., has been transported across state lines).

A person can be found guilty of that offense only if all of the following facts are proven:

- The person received or concealed or stored or disposed of items of stolen property.
- The items were moving as, or constituted a part of, interstate commerce.
- The items had a value in excess of $5,000.
- The person acted knowingly and willfully.

The government must prove beyond a reasonable doubt that the person either received, concealed, stored, sold, or disposed of the stolen property.

To be guilty of the offense, a person must know that the property had been stolen, but he need not know that it was moving as, or constituted a part of, interstate commerce. The term "interstate commerce" merely refers to the movement of property from one U.S. state into another; and it is sufficient if the property has recently moved interstate as a result of a transaction or a series of related transactions that have not been fully completed or consummated at the time of the person's acts as alleged.

All U.S. states also have laws regarding receipt of stolen property. There is no minimum dollar amount in many jurisdictions, and in the case of state laws the requirement from Federal law regarding interstate commerce does not apply. In many states (Ohio, for example), the burden to prove criminal intent is not as stringent or is nonexistent. This means that one can be charged with the crime—usually a minor degree of felony—even if one did not know the item in question was stolen. In the Ohio case of State v. Awad, the goods did not need to actually be stolen, just represented as such.

Receiving stolen property and possession of stolen property are treated as separate offenses in some jurisdictions. What distinguishes the offenses is when the person became aware that the property was stolen. If the person knew that the property was stolen at the time he received it, the crime is receiving stolen property. If the person did not know the property was stolen at the time she received it but found out after receiving possession, the crime is possession of stolen property.

The state must prove that the defendant received or possessed the property for a dishonest purpose. If, for example, the person acquired possession for the purpose of returning the property to its lawful owner, no crime has been committed.

== See also ==
- Fence (criminal)
- Handling salmon in suspicious circumstances
- Sting operation
