= Mistake (criminal law) =

Concept in criminal law

In criminal law, a mistake of fact may sometimes mean that, while a person has committed the physical element of an offence, because they were labouring under a mistake of fact, they never formed the mental element. This is unlike a mistake of law, which is not usually a defense; law enforcement may or may not take for granted that individuals know what the law is.

== Discussion ==
Most criminal law systems in developed states exclude mistake of law as a defense, because allowing defendants to invoke their own ignorance of the law would breach the public policy represented by the Latin maxim: ignorantia legis neminem excusat. But someone operating under a mistake of fact will not generally be liable, because, although the defendant has committed the actus reus of the offense, the defendant may honestly believe in a set of facts that would prevent him or her from forming the requisite mens rea required to constitute the crime.

For example: A defendant goes into a supermarket and places eight items in a basket which is presented to the cashier for payment in the usual way. Both honestly believe that all eight items have been scanned, and the defendant pays the sum shown on the bill. A store detective, however, notices that a mistake was made by the cashier so that only seven items were charged for. This detective arrests the defendant after leaving the store. Since the defendant honestly believes that he has become the owner of goods in a sale transaction, he cannot form the mens rea for theft (which is usually dishonesty) when he physically removes them from the store. Mistakes can also be of norms. See Glanville Williams and Dennis Baker Treatise of Criminal Law (6th edn 2024, Lexis Nexis database) paragraphs 40.17.

There is a complex question as to whether the defense of 'mistake' applies to crimes that do not specify a mental element, such as strict liability offences and manslaughter by criminal negligence. In Australia, the High Court's 2005 ruling in R v Lavender prevents the use of any 'reasonable mistake of fact' defense in cases of involuntary manslaughter. However, the defense of mistake is available to offences of strict liability such as drunk driving: see DPP v Bone [2005] NSWSC 1239. And it is the very availability of the defense of 'mistake' that distinguishes between offences of strict and absolute liability. Mistake of fact is unavailable in respect to absolute liability offences.

== Australia ==
=== Federal criminal law ===
The Australian federal law's Criminal Code describes most federal crimes, many of which were transferred from the Crimes Act 1914 (Cth). However, the Crimes Act does still define some federal crimes and others have been added in separate legislation for a variety of reason. For example, to override State or Territory laws, as with the Human Rights (Sexual Conduct) Act 1994 (Cth) that used the external affairs power to override the sodomy laws of the State of Tasmania, or with the Euthanasia Laws Act 1997 (Cth) that recriminalised euthanasia in the Northern Territory. Separate legislation has also been used when powers have been transferred from the States to the Commonwealth, such as with the Corporations Act 2001 (Cth) that includes penalties for misconduct by company directors, and in implementing international treaties, such as with the International Criminal Court Act 2002 (Cth) that implemented the Rome Statute into Australian law.

The Criminal Code contains specific provisions dealing with ignorance and mistakes, which permits acquittal in cases of mistakes of fact but not of law. Further, it mandates that a mistake of fact need not be reasonable for the defense to be available, but allows a jury to consider whether a fact is unreasonable in determining whether the person did actually believe the mistake being claimed.

== Canada ==
The leading Supreme Court of Canada case on the mistaken belief is R v Park, in which it was held that even unreasonable beliefs must be left to a jury to consider. The issue in most states is the extent to which the test of belief should be subjective or objective.

== England and Wales ==
=== Mistake of fact ===
Mistake of fact may be a defense in criminal law if it is genuine, whether or not it is reasonable.

In DPP v Morgan an RAF officer told three other officers to have sex with his wife, and that she would pretend to refuse just to be stimulating. They pleaded mistake, and the jury did not believe them. The House of Lords held that the judge had wrongly directed the jury that the mistake must be a reasonable one; the correct legal test was whether the defendants had honestly believed the wife was consenting, not whether they reasonably believed this. Williams & Baker argued that mistake of fact applies to normative standards such as dishonesty in property offences and what is improper conduct in bribery offences. However, on the facts the House of Lords held the conviction was nonetheless safe despite the misdirection. R v Williams confirmed the principle stated in Morgan that a belief that a certain set of facts are true does not need to be reasonable to operate under the defence of mistake. It merely needs to be genuine. However, the reasonableness of that belief is material in the jury deciding whether the defendant had actually held that belief.

An exception to this appears to be bigamy (see R v Tolson (1889) 23 QBD 168).

The Sexual Offences Act 2003 introduced a hybrid test of reasonable belief as to consent: the defendant must be seen to have taken steps to ascertain clearly whether the complainant was consenting in all the circumstances. This abolishes the defence of a genuine though unreasonably mistaken belief as to the consent.

=== Mistake of law ===
==== Mistakes about the criminal law ====
It is not a defence that the defendant held an honest and reasonable belief that what he was doing was not criminal. Where the defendant is a foreigner, and the offence is not criminal in his own country, the fact of such a belief is still not a defence. It is not a defence that the defendant believed that he would not be prosecuted for what he was doing.

===== Offences created by statutory instruments =====
Section 3(2) of the Statutory Instruments Act 1946 provides:

In any proceedings against any person for an offence consisting of a contravention of any such statutory instrument, it shall be a defence to prove that the instrument had not been issued by [or under the authority of] His Majesty’s Stationery Office at the date of the alleged contravention unless it is proved that at that date reasonable steps had been taken for the purpose of bringing the purport of the instrument to the notice of the public, or of persons likely to be affected by it, or of the person charged.

(Words in brackets inserted by section 1(1)(a) of the Statutory Instruments (Production and Sale) Act 1996, as read with section 1(2))

==== Mistakes about the civil law ====
A mistake about the civil law may have the effect of negating the mens rea for an offence. See:

- Section 2(1)(a) of the Theft Act 1968
- R v Smith (David Raymond) [1974] QB 354, 58 Cr App R 320, [1974] 2 WLR 20, [1974] 1 All ER 632, CA
- R v Gould [1968] 2 QB 65, 52 Cr App R 152, [1968] 2 WLR 643, [1968] 1 All ER 849, CA
- R v Barrett and Barrett, 72 Cr App R 212, [1980] Crim LR 641, CA

== See also ==
- Error
- Mistake (contract law)
