= R v Lawrence =

R v Lawrence may refer to:

- R v Lawrence, 47 Cr App R 72, CCA
- R v Lawrence, 52 Cr App R 163, [1968] 1 WLR 341, [1968] 1 All ER 579, CA
- R v Lawrence, 55 Cr App R 73, [1970] 3 All ER 933, CA
- R v Lawrence [1977] Crim LR 492
- R v Lawrence, 3 Cr App R (S) 49, CA
- R v Lawrence [1982] AC 510, [1981] 2 WLR 524, 73 Cr App R 1, [1981] 1 All ER 974, [1981] RTR 217, [1981] Crim LR 409, HL, reversing 71 Cr App R 291
- R v Lawrence, 5 Cr App R (S) 220, CA
- R v Lawrence, 11 Cr App R (S) 580, CA
- R v Lawrence (1989) The Times, December 4, CA
- R v Lawrence and Nash (1993) unreported, CA (transcript nos. 92/1355/Z2, 92/1356/Z2)
- R v Lawrence and Pomroy (1971) 57 Cr App R 64, [1971] Crim LR 645, CA
- Lawrence v Metropolitan Police Commissioner [1972] AC 626, [1971] 3 WLR 225, 55 Cr App R 471, HL, affirming [1971] 1 QB 373.

== See also ==
- Lists of case law
