= Haughton v Smith =

Regina v Roger Smith or more commonly Haughton v Smith
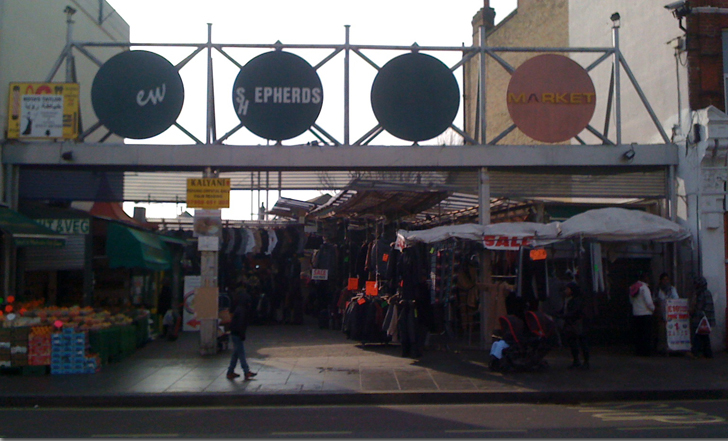
- Court: (Judicial Committee of the) House of Lords
- Decided: 21 November 1973
- Citation: [1975] AC 476, [1973] 3 All ER 1109, [1974] 3 W.L.R. 1
- Cases cited: Approved/applied: R v M'Pherson (1857); R v Collins (1864); R v Percy Dalton (London) Ltd (1949); R v Donnelly [1975]; Disapproved: R v Brown (1889); R v Ring (1892); Overruled: R v Miller (1965); R v Curbishley (1970)
- Legislation cited: none (common law)

Case history
- Prior actions: Crown Court; Appeal to the Court of Appeal: conviction quashed [1975] AC 476; [1973] 2 WLR 942; [1973] 2 All ER 896; 57 Cr App R 666,
- Subsequent action: None

Court membership
- Judges sitting: Lord Widgery CJ, James LJ, Lord Hailsham of St. Marylebone LC, Lord Reid, Lord Morris of Borth-y-Gest, Viscount Dilhorne and Lord Salmon

Case opinions
- Substituted sentence to be upheld; appeal seeking reinstatement of murder conviction dismissed (a per curiam judgement)

Keywords
- technical impossibility; legitimate not stolen goods; inchoate offences; attempt

Haughton v Smith was a judicial case in which the House of Lords ruled that it was impossible to commit the crime of handling stolen goods where the goods were not stolen; nor could an offence of attempting to handle them be committed in such circumstances. The latter part of the ruling was partially overturned by the Criminal Attempts Act 1981.

== Judgement ==
Viscount Dilhorne's statement about the impossibility of crimes still often quoted after a 1981 as regards barring the full-offence charge for completed alleged offences (for which full mens rea can be shown) but where the subject matter did not in the event amount to something prohibited:

A man taking his own umbrella from a club, thinking it the property of someone else, does not steal. His belief does not convert his conduct into an offence. In my view, it matters not that the crime cannot be committed as a result of physical impossibility, e.g. the absence of the property he wants to steal, or of legal impossibility. In either case he cannot be convicted of an attempt when he could not be convicted of the full offence if he had succeeded in doing all that he attempted to do. Conduct which is not criminal is not converted into criminal conduct by the accused believing that a state of affairs exists which does not.

This case was partially overturned as it would relate to inchoate (incomplete) offences, which can be prosecuted by the Criminal Attempts Act 1981. There is an in-depth discussion of the law of attempted crimes, in particular the debate about criminal liability in issues of impossible crimes.
