= R v Barton and Booth =

English criminal law case

- Court: Court of Appeal
- Full case name: R v Barton (David); R v Booth (Rosemary)
- Decided: 29 April 2020
- Citation: [2020] EWCA Crim 575, [2021] QB 685, [2020] 3 WLR 1333, [2020] 4 All ER 742, [2020] 2 Cr App R 7
- Cases cited: Ivey v Genting Casinos, R v Ghosh, R v James

Court membership
- Judges sitting: Lord Burnett LCJ, Dame Victoria Sharp PQBD, Fulford LJ, McGowan J, Cavanagh J

Keywords
- admissibility, capacity, care homes, conspiracy to defraud, dishonesty, elderly persons, false accounting, gifts, jury directions, legal certainty, obiter dicta, precedent, summing up, theft, totality of sentence

R v Barton and Booth [2020] EWCA Crim 575 is a complex and highly significant case in the criminal law of England & Wales. While the crimes at issue were newsworthy as the appellants fraudulently obtained over £4m from elderly residents of the care home they operated, its significance to UK law is primarily due to settling the difficulties caused by the judgment of Ivey v Genting Casinos, and the impact this had on stare decisis.

== Ivey ==
Ivey v Genting Casinos was a Supreme Court case in 2017 that considered whether dishonesty is an element of 'cheating' for the purposes of a breach of contract claim. The court decided the matter by determining that it is not.

As the matter was decided on this basis, analysis of the legal test of dishonesty was unnecessary. The court nonetheless dedicated a substantial amount of the judgment to it, concluding that the test in criminal law (the Ghosh test) had diverged from the test in civil law and directing that the 'objective' civil test (Twinsectra Ltd v Yardley) was to be preferred.

Under the common law rules of precedent, only the ratio decidendi of the decision is held to be binding on inferior courts. Comments beyond the issues of the immediate case are obiter dicta and merely persuasive authority to inferior courts that must give way to binding authority.

This created significant difficulties as although the clear intention of the court in Ivey was that the law of dishonesty had been changed, as the matter had not been argued by the parties in court, it would be contrary to the principles of common law to favour the new test above the well-established and undoubtedly binding Ghosh test.

== Facts ==
David Barton ran the Barton Park Nursing Home in Southport, of which Rosemary Booth was general manager. The pair first came to the attention of police when Barton made a civil claim against the estate of a deceased resident for approximately £10m, the deceased's family asked the police to investigate.

Barton was alleged to have dishonestly targeted and befriended elderly, childless residents of the home, using their trust to become the residuary beneficiary of their wills, control their finances, and grant him power of attorney. Furthermore, Barton was accused of obtaining cash "gifts" from residents, charging unreasonable and sometimes fabricated fees, negotiating "lifetime agreements" for a right to reside at the home for their remaining lives in exchange for large up-front fees, and grossly overcharging two residents in the sale of Rolls-Royce motor cars.

Booth was accused of abusing her position of trust among the residents to act as the "eyes and ears" of Barton and to assist him in fraud.

There were no accusations of physical abuse of the residents, and no allegation that they lacked capacity to enter into agreements willingly. The alleged conduct took place over a period of almost 20 years and Barton obtained approximately £4.13m.

When directing the jury, Judge Everett relied on the Crown Court Compendium and Archbold: Criminal Pleading, Evidence and Practice for the direction that dishonesty be decided according to the test in Ivey rather than the test in Ghosh.

On 11 May 2018 at Liverpool Crown Court, Barton was convicted of:

- 4 counts of conspiracy to defraud contrary to common law
- 3 counts of theft contrary to s1 of the Theft Act 1968
- 1 count of fraud contrary to s1 of the Fraud Act 2006
- 1 count of false accounting contrary to s17 of the Theft Act 1968
- 1 count of transferring criminal property contrary to s327 of the Proceeds of Crime Act 2002

Booth was convicted of:

- 3 counts of conspiracy to defraud contrary to common law

On 13 July 2018, Barton was sentenced to a total of 21 years imprisonment, and Booth was sentenced to a total of 6 years imprisonment. The pair appealed on 8 grounds, though most relevantly; ground (i) on the correct test of dishonesty, and ground (iii) whether the judge erred in directions to the jury on Ivey dishonesty.

== Judgment ==
=== Resolving the Uncertainty of Ivey ===
The Lord Chief Justice, Lord Burnett of Maldon first summarised the Ghosh test to be:

(a) was the defendant's conduct dishonest by the ordinary standards of reasonable people? If so, (b) did the defendant appreciate that his conduct was dishonest by those standards?

The Ivey test was summarised to be:

(a) what was the defendant's actual state of knowledge or belief as to the facts; and (b) was his conduct dishonest by the standards of ordinary decent people?

The court recounted the reasoning given by the Supreme Court in Ivey and expressed their agreement. They did, however, expressly acknowledge that the status of the Supreme Court's discussion of dishonesty could only be obiter, and summarised the submissions of the appellants (defendants):

93. There is no doubt that the discussion on dishonesty in Ivey [2018] AC 391 was strictly obiter because it was not necessary for the decision of the court. It is for this reason that the defendants submit that it has no legal impact on the decision in Ghosh [1982] QB 1053. [...] The defendants submit that we should apply Ghosh and then let the matter return to the Supreme Court. They point out that the Supreme Court did not appear to hear argument on the issue. They recognise that would give rise to the distinct possibility that the wrong test for dishonesty would be applied in the meantime in thousands of cases in the magistrates' and Crown Courts but that is a consequence of following properly the rules of precedent.

The court did not accept these submissions. Instead the court relied on analogy to the case of R v James, which they described as a case in which the Court of Appeal had decided it was bound to follow the decision of the Privy Council over the House of Lords on the law of provocation despite Privy Council authority not ordinarily being binding on UK courts:

100. In giving the judgment of the Court of Appeal in R v James Lord Phillips of Worth Matravers CJ noted that the effect of continuing to follow the earlier House of Lords decision, whilst inevitably giving leave to appeal, would be to require judges to direct juries in a way which would necessarily be overturned. The court did not want to produce that result, but to avoid it needed to answer two questions: "(i) How do we justify disregarding very well-established rules of precedent? And (ii) what principles do we put in place of those that we are disregarding? The two questions are obviously interrelated." (Para 40.)

101. The answers to those questions followed between paras 41 and 45. In summary, it was the Lords of Appeal in Ordinary, albeit sitting in the Privy Council, who had altered the established approach to precedent. The rules of precedent are common law principles and it was not for the Court of Appeal to rule that it was beyond their powers to develop them. The position had been reached where the Privy Council could overrule a decision of the House of Lords with the consequence that the Court of Appeal was bound to follow the decision of the Privy Council. Lord Phillips then identified three features of the decision which justified the conclusion. First, all the Law Lords sitting in the Privy Council, including those who dissented, agreed that the decision definitively clarified English law. Secondly, the majority in the Privy Council constituted half the Appellate Committee (i.e. six) of the House of Lords. Thirdly, the result of an appeal to the House of Lords was a foregone conclusion. Lord Phillips noted that it was unlikely that these circumstances would again arise, and the judgment should not be taken as an invitation to decline to follow a decision of the House of Lords in any other circumstances.

The Court of Appeal held that the Privy Council could overrule the House of Lords (as it then was) as the Law Lords (i) sat both in the House of Lords and on the Privy Council, (ii) agreed that their judgment reflected English law, and (iii) would hand down the same decision on appeal of the matter if sitting in the House of Lords. Importantly, the Court of Appeal held this to be a change to the rule of precedent. Furthermore, they regarded rules of precedent to have been changed by Ivey also:

The undoubted reality is that in Ivey [2018] AC 391 the Supreme Court altered the established common law approach to precedent in the criminal courts by stating that the test for dishonesty they identified, albeit strictly contained in obiter dicta, should be followed in preference to an otherwise binding authority of the Court of Appeal.

The court clarified:

104. We conclude that where the Supreme Court itself directs that an otherwise binding decision of the Court of Appeal should no longer be followed and proposes an alternative test that it says must be adopted, the Court of Appeal is bound to follow what amounts to a direction from the Supreme Court even though it is strictly obiter. To that limited extent the ordinary rules of precedent (or stare decisis) have been modified. We emphasise that this limited modification is confined to cases in which all the judges in the appeal in question in the Supreme Court agree that to be the effect of the decision. Such was a necessary condition before adjusting the rules of precedent accepted by this court in James in relation to the Privy Council. Had the minority of the Privy Council in Holley not agreed that the effect of the judgment was to state definitively the law in England, it would not have been accepted as such by this court. The same approach is necessary here because it forms the foundation for the conclusion that the result is considered by the Supreme Court to be definitive, with the consequence that a further appeal would be a foregone conclusion, and binding on lower courts.

Ivey was thus held to be the correct test for dishonesty.

=== Application to the Appeal ===
Having accepted Ivey as the correct test, the question still remained whether the jury had been misdirected as to its formulation, the appeal asserting that only the second part had been put to the jury- omitting the first part regarding the defendant's state of mind. The court concluded that it was clear from the summing up as a whole that the jury was to apply the test of dishonesty with regard to all the facts, including the experience and intelligence of the accused.

The appeals were dismissed, Barton was given permission to appeal against sentence.

== Significance ==
This decision was regarded as giving some much needed clarification to what specifically is to be considered in the first leg of the Ivey test, however questions still lingered as to what extent the jury may consider subjective factors and how relevant they are to be, For example, the relevance of what the defendant believes to be dishonest (as under the Ghosh test).

The extent to which the situation of R v Barton was analogous to R v James was questioned academically. The dilemma in James was of how to resolve two conflicting authorities that both related to provocation as a partial defence to murder, in Barton the conflict was between a case where dishonesty had not been at issue (Ivey) and a case where it had (Ghosh). In Ivey no party was able to put forward arguments in favour of the Ghosh test because they were not invited to do so.

The notion that the Supreme Court had changed the rules of precedent was also criticised. Laird found it more accurate to say that the Court of Appeal had changed the rules, as it was open to the court to remain bound by Ghosh and allow an appeal to the Supreme Court to confirm the test in Ivey. In particular Laird criticised the view that the Supreme Court could alter the rules of precedent without confronting the fact that it is doing so, an opportunity the court would have had if Ghosh had been upheld in the Court of Appeal. Moreover, the presumption that the Supreme Court would have upheld Ivey was less than certain as each of the justices that heard Ivey had since retired.

Further complaint arose from the fact that academic consensus on the problems with the Ghosh test related to the first, objective leg. Neither Barton nor Ivey addressed these arguments before making the objective leg the most important part of the Ivey test. Of particular concern is whether industry practices are to be considered dishonest if the public, being unaccustomed to them, regards them so.

Additionally, Barton failed to address how a genuine gift can amount to 'property belonging to another' under s1 of the Theft Act 1968 without the defendant being able to rely on s2(1)(a) that they believed they had a lawful right to deprive the other of it.

Strictly speaking, Ivey remains the leading case on dishonesty in criminal law, not Barton, although the restating of the test and clarifications of the first leg remain important authority.

== See also ==
- R v Hinks [2001] 2 AC 241
