= Theft by finding =

Taking an unattended object without checking if it is genuinely abandoned

In criminal and property law, theft by finding occurs when someone chances upon an object which seems abandoned and takes possession of the object, but fails to take steps to establish whether the object is genuinely abandoned and not merely lost or unattended before taking it for themselves. In some jurisdictions, the crime is called "larceny by finding" or "stealing by finding".

== By nation ==
=== England and Wales ===
In England and Wales, a theft occurs when there is a dishonest appropriation of property belonging to another with the intention to permanently deprive. This definition can therefore include property that is found, whether abandoned or incorrectly delivered, where the finder does not take appropriate steps to return it to the lawful owner. Commonly it was accepted in the UK that property is handed in to a police station for repatriation, unless the finder can locate the owner directly – such as returning a credit-card to a branch of the issuing bank, or sending a driving-licence back to the DVLA. However, due to limited resource police forces in the United Kingdom no longer handle lost property and direct finders to private web sites and organisations, with a few explicitly stated exceptions relating to illegal materials, significant amounts of cash, high value items or items with significant personally identifying information.

The finder of lost property acquires a possessory right by taking physical control of the property, but does not necessarily have ownership of the property. The finder must take reasonable steps to locate the owner. If the finder shows that reasonable steps to find the owner have been taken then the finder may establish that the required mens rea for theft, the intention to deprive the owner permanently, is absent.

Some have argued that finding should not be a province for the criminal law system but that any dispute as to ownership be left to resolution via a civil suit. Others have argued that the jurisprudence gives rise to legal fictions and strained reasoning which has attracted divergent statutory law reform in different jurisdictions.

In discussing the history of finding, Alice Tay collected some cases (at footnote 36) where a finder raised an unsuccessful defence to larceny on the grounds that the circumstances of finding were such that no inquiry as to the true owner was required:

- Lamb's Case (1694) 2 East, P. C. (London, 1803) 664 (driver of hackney carriage keeping articles and cases left behind by passengers)
- Wynne's Case (1786) 1 Leach 413, 168 E. R. 308, 2 East, P. C. 664 (facts as in Lamb's Case)
- R. v. Pope (1834) 6 C. & P. 346, 172 E. R. 1270 (prisoner picking up hat after brawl in passage of public house)
- R. v. Kerr (1837) 8 C. & P. 176, 173 E. R. 449 (servant keeping money picked up in passage of master's dwelling-house)
- R. v. Peters (1843) 1 C. & K. 245, 174 E. R. 795 (prisoner 'finding' valuable ornaments in garden of one who had employed him to do some work)
- R. v. West (1854) 6 Cox C. C. 417 (stall-keeper appropriating purse left on stall by customer)
- R. v. Moore (1861) L. & C. 1, 169 E. R. 1278 (barber-shop keeper converting banknote picked up on floor after a customer had purchased some hair oil)

and cases where the circumstances were held to show no larceny:

- R. v. Wood (1848) 3 Cox C. C. 277 (banknote found on open land)
- R. v. Dixon (1855) 7 Cox C. C. 35, 25 L. J. M. C. 39 (lost note without mark)
- R. v. Shea (1856) 7 Cox C. C. 147; R. v. Christopher (1858) Bell C. C. 27, 169 E. R. 1153 (unmarked notes and purse found in public place)
- R. v. Glyde (1868) 11 Cox C. C. 103 (sovereign found in high road)
- R. v. Deavis (1869) 11 Cox C. C. 227 (prisoner's child found six sovereigns in public place)

An issue may arise when a person takes possession of lost property with the intention of returning it to the owner after inquiry but later converts the property to the finder's use. This is illustrated by Thompson v. Nixon [1965] 3 W.L.R. 501: an off duty police constable found a bag of rabbit food lying by the roadside, took it home intending to hand it in as lost property but some time after decided to keep it for his own use. He was found guilty at first instance but his ultimate appeal to the Divisional Court was upheld. The appellate court held that, at the time of finding, there was no mens rea to support a conviction of larceny.

=== United States ===
In the United States, if the owner of a property has renounced all property rights in the object, then the property is abandoned. Since theft is the unlawful taking of another person's property, an essential element of the actus reus of theft is absent.

==== Trash ====
In California v. Greenwood (1988), the United States Supreme Court ruled that trash left at curbside for collection is effectively abandoned and subject to taking by anyone. This ruling superseded the California Supreme Court ruling, in People v. Krivda (1971), that placing trash at curbside was not necessarily an abandonment of same to the police or general public, as a reasonable assumption would be that only a particular regulated entity (i.e. the trash collection company or department) would take possession. However, many cities and counties in the United States have enacted ordinances against dumpster diving, which includes garbology (the examination and analysis of trash).

=== Australia ===
In Victoria, the Victorian Crimes Act defines this crime by exception "72.3(c) A person's appropriation of property belonging to another is not to be regarded as dishonest if he appropriates the property in the belief that the person to whom the property belongs cannot be discovered by taking reasonable steps.

In Queensland, there is a similar warning.

== In fiction ==
The concept of theft by finding occasionally appears in fiction. An example in popular movies is the 1946 Hollywood film, It's a Wonderful Life, in which the protagonist loses a small fortune to his business opponent, precipitating his attempted suicide. It is also featured in an episode of Hey Arnold!, whose plot involves three characters who have stumbled upon a paper sack of money in an alley, with focus toward the ethical considerations of keeping it.

== See also ==
- Finders, keepers
