= Long v. State =

1949 American criminal law case

Long v. State, 44 Del. 262, 65 A.2d 489 (1949), is an American criminal law case in which the court qualified the principle that "ignorance of the law is no excuse", including in cases in which the defendant is acting on incorrect advice from her private attorney that an act is legal, when it is not. The case involved a man who received a divorce in Arkansas and whether or not he had met the residency requirement in that state.
