= Lawrence v Metropolitan Police Commissioner =

Lawrence v Commissioner of Police of the Metropolis
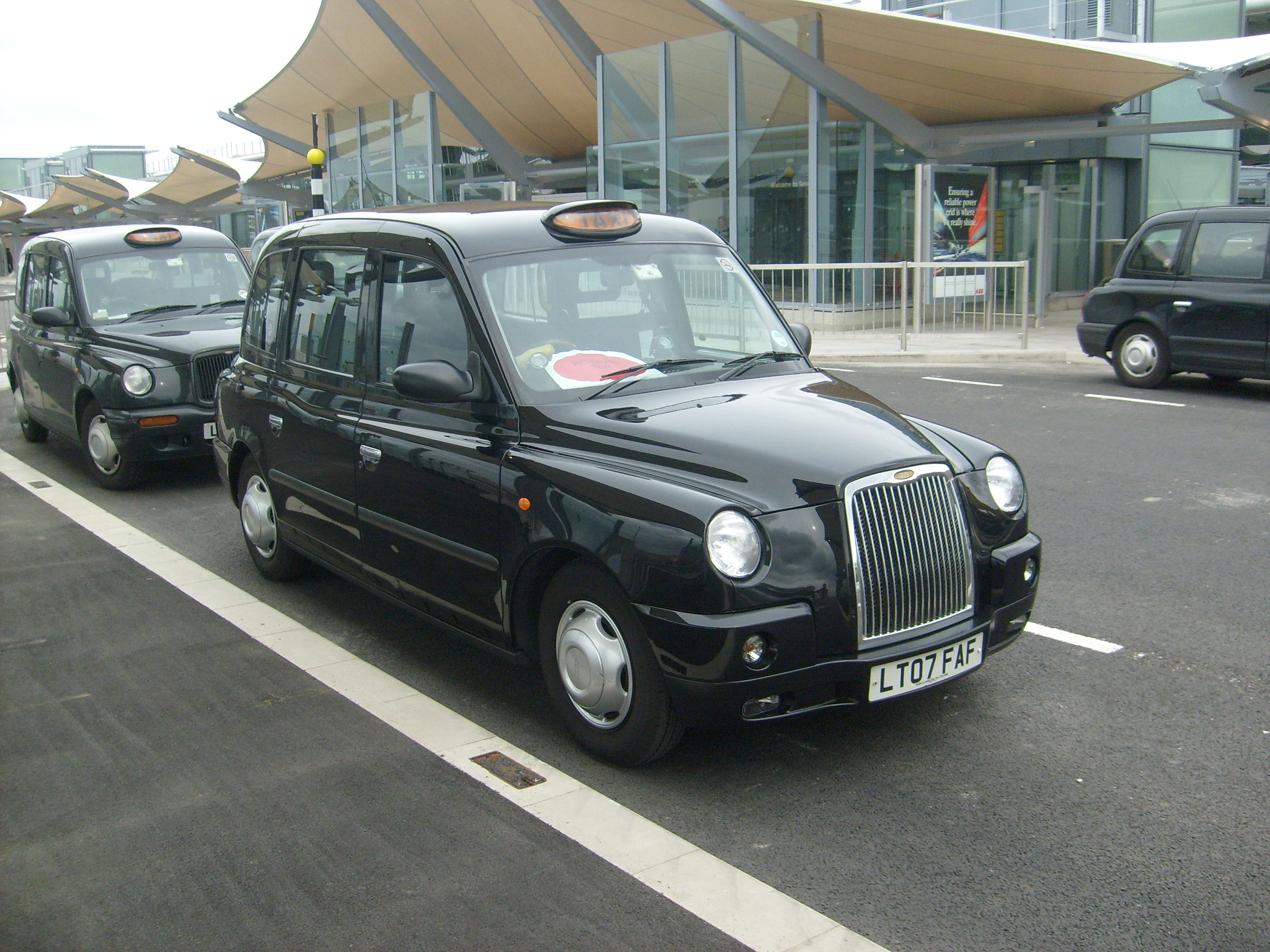
- Court: House of Lords
- Decided: 30 June 1971
- Citation: [1972] AC 626; [1971] 3 WLR 225; [1971] 2 All ER 1253; (1971) 55 Cr App R 471; (1971) 115 SJ 565

Keywords
- Appropriation, consent

Lawrence v Commissioner of Police of the Metropolis (otherwise known as R v Lawrence) [1972] AC 262 is an English criminal law case establishing that the appropriation of property — under the meaning of the Theft Act 1968 — can be consented to. The House of Lords here ruled that an appropriation of property can occur even with the consent of the owner. To this end, they commented that the drafter's intentions in leaving out consent from the offence was to relieve the prosecution of establishing a lack of consent.

== Facts ==
Upon arrival at London Victoria railway station an Italian student got into a taxi driven by the defendant. The student then handed the driver a piece of paper with the destination he wished to go to. The taxi driver informed him that it was a long and expensive journey, and proceeded to take £6 from the student's open wallet, ostensibly to cover the fare. Unknown to the student, who was not familiar with the area, the correct fare was just 10s 6d. (52.5p)

== Judgment ==
The House of Lords upheld the earlier judgment of the Court of Appeal, holding that a conviction under section 1 of the Theft Act 1968 was correct. Four elements are required for an offence to fall under section 1:

A person is guilty of theft if he (1) dishonestly (2) appropriates (3) property (4) belonging to another with the (5) intention of permanently depriving the other of it; and 'thief' and 'steal' shall be construed accordingly.

Viscount Dilhorne interpreted these words as not requiring a lack of consent of the owner, stating that he saw: "no ground for concluding that the omission of the words "without the consent of the owner" was inadvertent and not deliberate," and that Parliament in omitting the words had simply removed the necessity for prosecutions to establish an appropriation was without an owner's consent. On the issue of whether an appropriation could be consented to, Dilhorne elaborated:

I agree. That there was appropriation in this case is clear. Section 3 (1) states that any assumption by a person of the rights of an owner amounts to an appropriation. Here there was clearly such an assumption. That an appropriation was dishonest may be proved in a number of ways. In this case it was not contended that the appellant had not acted dishonestly. Section 2 (1) provides, inter alia, that a person's appropriation of property belonging to another is not to be regarded as dishonest if he appropriates the property in the belief that he would have the other's consent if the other knew of the appropriation and the circumstances of it. A fortiori, a person is not to be regarded as acting dishonestly if he appropriates another's property believing that with full knowledge of the circumstances that other person has in fact agreed to the appropriation. The appellant, if he believed that Mr. Occhi, knowing that £7 was far in excess of the legal fare, had nevertheless agreed to pay him that sum, could not be said to have acted dishonestly in taking it. When Megaw LJ said that if there was true consent, the essential element of dishonesty was not established, I understand him to have meant this. Belief or the absence of belief that the owner had with such knowledge consented to the appropriation is relevant to the issue of dishonesty, not to the question whether or not there has been an appropriation. That may occur even though the owner has permitted or consented to the property being taken. So proof that Mr. Occhi had consented to the appropriation of £6 from his wallet without agreeing to paying a sum in excess of the legal fare does not suffice to show that there was not dishonesty in this case. There was ample evidence that there was.

== See also ==
- R v Morris
- R v Gomez
- R v Hinks
- Theft Act 1968
