= R v Ghosh =

English criminal law case

Regina v Deb Baran Ghosh
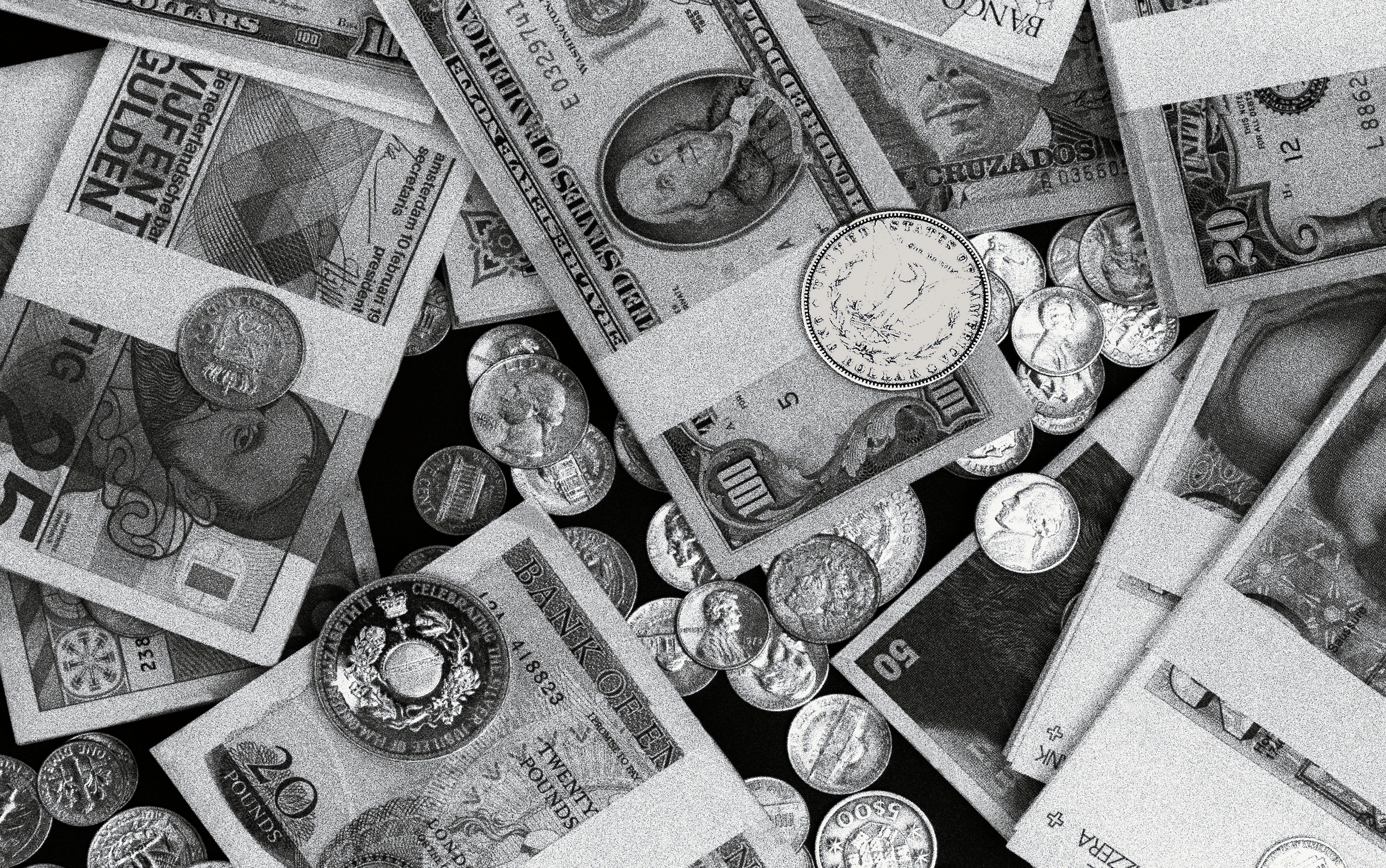
- Court: Court of Appeal
- Full case name: R v Deb Baran Ghosh
- Decided: 5 April 1982
- Citation: [1982] EWCA Crim 2, [1982] 3 WLR 110, [1982] QB 1053, [1982] 2 All ER 689

Case history
- Prior action: Conviction in Crown Court at St Albans (unreported): 29 April 1981

Court membership
- Judges sitting: Lord Lane, C.J.; Lloyd J; Eastham J.

Keywords
- Dishonesty; whether objective and subjective test

R v Ghosh [1982] EWCA Crim 2 is an English criminal law case setting out a test for dishonest (Note: Commonly prosecuted examples include making an untruthful or misleading application for settled immigration status by or for a person not entitled to that status on any other ground; obtaining a valuable benefit or a payment by making a false statement or using dishonesty; employment of a workforce not entitled to be employed) conduct which was relevant as to many offences worded as doing an act dishonestly, such as deception, as theft, as mainstream types of fraud, and as benefits fraud. The test has been revised to an objective test, with rare exceptions, by the Supreme Court in Ivey v Genting Casinos [2017] UKSC 67.

== Facts ==
Dr Ghosh was a surgeon. He was convicted of four offences under the Theft Act 1968 sections 20(2) and 15(1). During his work as a locum surgeon he was paid one set of extra wages and attempted three times to obtain such wages by claiming variously: for work that others had carried out and for work reimburseable to him via the National Health Service. The jury found him guilty. He appealed on the basis that the trial judge had told the jury to use their common sense to determine whether the accused's conduct had been dishonest or not. His defence team argued that the judge should have instructed the jury that dishonesty was about the accused's state of mind (a subjective test) rather than the jury's point of view (an objective test).

== Judgment ==
The Court of Appeal found that the conviction was proper, so dismissed the doctor's appeal as the original direction did not lead to an unsafe or unsound conviction.

The Court (its most senior member, the Chief Justice) began by stating "The law, on this branch of the Theft Act 1968 is in a complicated state and we embark upon an examination of the authorities with great diffidence." This court reformulated the test for dishonesty. It held that

... a jury must first of all decide whether according to the ordinary standards of reasonable and honest people what was done was dishonest ... If it was dishonest ... then the jury must consider whether the defendant himself must have realised that what he was doing was by those standards dishonest.

Hence the test for dishonesty was subjective and objective. As a result, the 'Ghosh test', which the jury was required to consider before reaching a verdict on dishonesty:

1. Was the act one that an ordinary decent person (normally considered to be the ubiquitous 'man on the Clapham omnibus') would consider to be dishonest (the objective test)? If so:
2. Must the accused have realised that what he was doing was, by those standards, dishonest (the subjective test)?

The latter part of the test was overruled by the Supreme Court in 2017 in the case of Ivey v Genting Casinos.

Note that it was not essential for a person to admit that they acted in a way that they knew to be dishonest; it was probably enough that they knew others would think their behaviour was dishonest, or that they thought that what they were doing was wrong.

== Ivey v Genting Casinos ==
Ivey v Genting Casinos (UK) Ltd t/a Crockfords was a Supreme Court case decided in late 2017 which expressed the view in obiter dictum that Ghosh did not correctly represent the law, that the objective test was preferred and that the test of dishonesty is as set out by Lord Nicholls in Royal Brunei Airlines Sdn Bhd v Tan [1995] UKPC 4 and by Lord Hoffmann in Barlow Clowes International Ltd v Eurotrust International Ltd [2005] UKPC 37. When dishonesty was in question, the fact-finding tribunal must first ascertain the actual state of the individual's knowledge or belief as to the facts. The question whether the conduct was honest or dishonest was then to be determined by applying the objective standards of ordinary decent people.

The Supreme Court noted particularly that though their case concerned a cheating gambler (as they found Ivey to be) suing the casino in a civil case, there was no good reason for distinguishing civil from criminal dishonesty, and that accordingly the criminal law was incorrectly understood as set out in Ghosh. The Court of Appeal has confirmed the applicability of Ivey (and the overruling of Ghosh) in R v Barton and Booth.

== See also ==
- Social Security Administration Act 1992

== Notes and references ==
Notes
