= R v Morris; Anderton v Burnside =

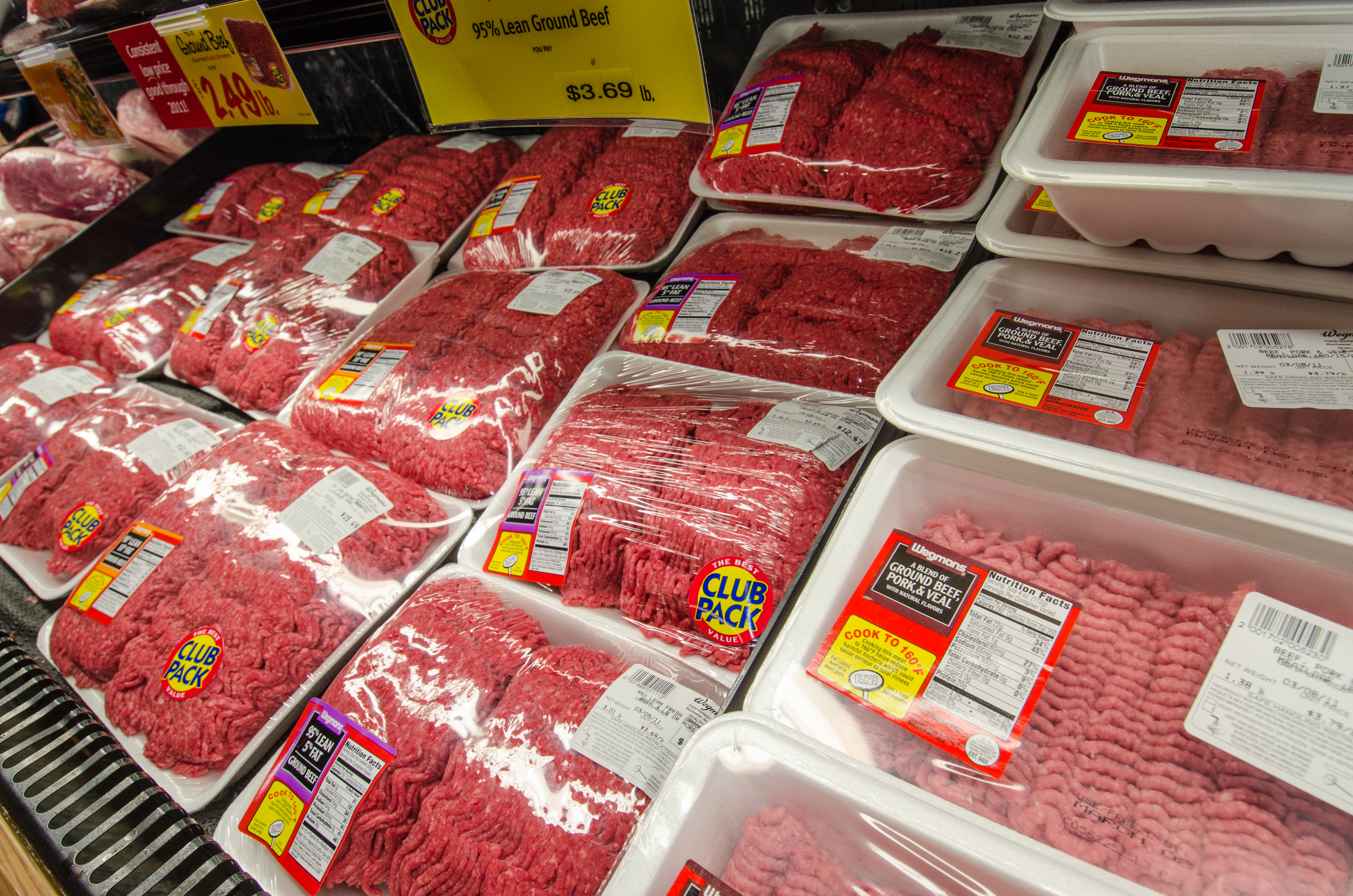
- Court: Judicial Committee of the House of Lords
- Full case name: The Crown and or against (most formally Regina versus) David Alan Morris (appellant); Cyril James Anderton and Asda Stores Limited (on behalf of Her Majesty) and James Burnside (appellant)
- Decided: 20, 21 July, judgement delivered 13 October 1984
- Citations: [1984] UKHL 1, [1983] 3 All ER 288, [1984] AC 320, [1983] 3 WLR 697, 77 Cr App R 309
- Cases cited: Lawrence v MPC
- Legislation cited: Theft Act 1968

Case history
- Prior actions: Conviction by courts of first instance, then 8 Mar 1983 [1983] QB 587; [1983] 2 WLR 768; [1983] 2 All ER 448; 77 Cr App R 164, CA; 5 May 1983 appeal petition allowed [1983] 1 WLR 625
- Subsequent action: None

Court membership
- Judges sitting: Lord Fraser, Lord Edmund-Davies, Lord Roskill, Lord Brandon, Lord Brightman

Case opinions
- Lord Roskill, per curiam (delivering the judgment of the court, concurred in by all others),

Keywords
- Theft; appropriation; swapping prices

R v Morris; Anderton v Burnside [1984] are English highest court conjoined appeal decisions as to the extent of appropriation that can be considered criminal (as the law of theft is codified in the Theft Act 1968).

R v Morris was a final appeal from the Court of Appeal; Anderton v Burnside a leapfrog final appeal from the Divisional Court (the usual first appellate court from the Magistrates if a point of law is in question).

Agreeing with Lord Roskill, per curiam (formulating the decision of the whole court), the Law Lords established that in the English law of theft, an appropriation is established if the defendant clearly assumes a right of the owner, that is the prosecution proves such assumption beyond a reasonable doubt.

== Facts ==
=== R v Morris ===
On 30 October 1981 Morris took goods from the shelves of a supermarket. He replaced the price labels attached to them with labels showing a lesser price than the originals. At the checkout he was asked for and paid those lesser prices. He was then arrested.

=== Anderton v Burnside ===
Burnside was seen to remove a price label £2.73 from a joint of pork and attached it to another (at £6.91). The checkout was notified and did not allow him to leave the store. He was then arrested.

== Grounds for appeal ==
=== Both cases ===
If a person has substituted on an item of goods displayed in a self-service store a price label showing a lesser price for one showing a greater price, with the intention of paying the lesser price and then pays the lesser price at the till and takes the goods, is there at any stage a 'dishonest appropriation' for the purposes of Section 1 of the Theft Act 1968 and if so, at what point does such appropriation take place.

== Judgment ==
Lord Roskill in rejecting the defence team's argument, supported by division between "distinguished academic lawyers" said:

"…the later words "any later assumption of a right" in subsection (1) and the words in subsection (2) "no later assumption by him of rights" seem to me to militate strongly against the correctness of the submission. Moreover the provisions of section 2(1)(a) also seem to point in the same direction. It follows therefore that it is enough for the prosecution if they have proved in these cases the assumption by the defendants of any of the rights of the owner of the goods in question…"
