= Dishonesty =

Concept in English law

Dishonesty is acting without honesty. The term describes acts which are meant to deceive, cheat, or mislead.

Dishonesty is a basic feature of most offences defined in criminal law, such as fraud, which relates to the illicit acquisition, conversion, or disposal of property, tangible or intangible.

== English law ==
Dishonesty has had a number of definitions. For many years, there were two views of what constituted dishonesty in English law. The first contention was that the definitions of dishonesty (such as those within the Theft Act 1968) described a course of action, whereas the second contention was that the definition described a state of mind. A clear test within the criminal law emerged from R v Ghosh (1982) 75 CR App. R. 154. The Court of Appeal held that dishonesty is an element of mens rea, clearly referring to a state of mind, and that overall, the test that must be applied is hybrid, but with a subjective bias which "looks into the mind" of the person concerned and establishes what he was thinking. The test is two-stage:

- "Were the person's actions honest according to the standards of reasonable and honest people?" If a jury decides that they were, then the defendant's claim to be honest will be credible. But, if the court decides that the actions were dishonest, the further question is:
- "Did the person concerned believe that what he did was dishonest at the time?"

But this decision was criticised, and over-ruled, by the UK Supreme Court in the case of Ivey v Genting Casinos (UK) Ltd t/a Crockfords [2017] UKSC 67. The position as a result is that the court must form a view of what the defendant's belief was of the relevant facts (but it is no longer necessary to consider whether the person concerned believed that what he did was dishonest at the time). The decision in Ivey was strictly obiter but in any case has been confirmed as the correct test of dishonesty in R v Barton and Booth.

Baker argues against Ivey v Genting. Baker argues that genuine mistakes about what is honest provides a mistake defence. "The mistaken honesty constraint is an excusatory defence that is raised to show that the requisite fault for the offence was negated. It works as a defence because property harm has been done (someone has lost their property), but D is excused because she has an honest state of mind due to her mistaken belief. It has long worked as an normative excuse—it excuses those who mistakenly believe they have a moral or legal right to the property. A mistaken moral claim of right needs to be reasonable, but a claim of right based on a mistake of fact or civil law can be unreasonable, if it was genuine."

In relation to bribery, Baker argues: "Like the test of dishonesty for property offences, the normativity of the way the function or activity is performed is measured against contemporary British norms. If the conduct is against normal business practice and is generally regarded as improper, then it will be deemed as such by following a reasonable person assessment of what to expect in the UK. While local custom in the jurisdiction where the bribe might be offered is ignored, local law can be taken into account. Hence, if the practice is legal in the relevant jurisdiction and is a norm, then that can help demonstrate that the person making the offer was not intending to influence another to act improperly or did not believe it was improper for that person to accept the advantage."

Where dishonesty is an issue in civil cases, the trend in English law is for only the actions to be tested objectively and not to apply any test as to the subjective state of mind of the actor. Now that the decision in Ghosh has been over-ruled, the same legal test applies in English law in civil and criminal cases.

=== Theft Act 1968 ===
The Theft Act 1968 contains a single definition for dishonesty which is intended to apply to all the substantive offences. Yet, rather than defining what dishonesty is, s. 2 describes what it is not, allowing a jury to take a flexible approach, thus:

s. 2.

- (1). A person's appropriation of property belonging to another is not to be regarded as dishonest:
  - (a) if he appropriates the property in the belief that he has in law the right to deprive the other of it, on behalf of himself or of a third person; or
  - (b) if he appropriates the property in the belief that he would have the other's consent if the other knew of the appropriation and the circumstances of it; or
  - (c) (except where the property came to him as trustee or personal representative) if he appropriates the property in the belief that the person to whom the property belongs cannot be discovered by taking reasonable steps.
- (2). A person's appropriation of property belonging to another may be dishonest notwithstanding that he is willing to pay for the property.

The s. 2(1)(a) claim of right is a difficult concept in that it represents a statutory exception to the fundamental public policy principle that ignorance of the law is no excuse and allows a limited mistake of law defence. According to R v Turner (No. 2) [1971] 2 All ER 441, a case in which a man was charged with the s. 1 theft of his own car, the test was one of honest belief in a right, not a mere permission, to act in the particular way. In this, the test is subjective and a matter of fact for the jury to decide.

- If the owner, or some person able to give a valid consent, actually consented to the taking, the property would not belong to another and no actus reus would exist. This provision applies to the situation in which either the consent is void ab initio or is subsequently voided. If the existence or effect of the vitiating factor is not recognised by the defendant, then he would not be dishonest – for example, if a contract was affected by a common or mutual mistake. But if the defendant is initially innocent, he may become dishonest if he later realises the mistake and decides to keep the property (i.e. an omission). Similarly, if he has knowingly misrepresented a material fact and this has induced a consent that he knows or ought to know would not have been freely given, he will be dishonest.
- Defendants who are in a fiduciary relationship are expected to make even unreasonable efforts to identify where the relevant property has come from, but the ordinary defendant who finds property apparently abandoned on the street may not be dishonest if there are no serial numbers or marks that would help to identify the owner. Note that to be abandoned, the owner must have intended to give up all rights in the property and not to pass those rights to another. For example, material discarded in a rubbish bin is not abandoned. The owner intends another to come, empty the bin and dispose of the property without stealing it in the process. Hence, it will be theft to remove any property from a bin or legal disposal site.
- If the defendant knows that the owner will not sell the property, so takes the property in any event but leaves a realistic sum of money by way of payment, this will be a dishonest appropriation.

For the purposes of the deception offences, dishonesty is a separate element to be proved. The fact that a defendant knowingly deceives the owner into parting with possession of property does not, of itself, prove the dishonesty. This distinguishes between "obtaining by a dishonest deception" and "dishonestly obtains by a deception".

== Debtors ==
Debtor's dishonesty or dishonesty to creditors is a crime in Finland and Sweden. It is an abuse of the bankruptcy process, where the debtor attempts to prevent the recovery of assets.

In Finnish law, the crimes of debtor's dishonesty (velallisen epärehellisyys) and aggravated debtor's dishonesty (törkeä velallisen epärehellisyys) are defined. A debtor is dishonest if "1) he destroys his or her property, 2) gives away or otherwise surrenders his or her property without acceptable reason, 3) transfers his or her property abroad in order to place it beyond the reach of his or her creditors or 4) increases his or her liabilities without basis, and thus causes his or her insolvency or essentially worsens his or her state of insolvency". The crime is considered aggravated if "1) considerable benefit is sought, 2) considerable or particularly substantial damage is caused to the creditors, or 3) the offence is committed in a particularly methodical manner". The punishment is fine or imprisonment for at most two years, and four months at minimum and four years at maximum if aggravated. It is essential that there is a direct cause and effect between a debtor's deliberate action and the insolvency; mere poor management or accidental losses are not grounds for conviction. Taking into account judicial practice, the best defense is to claim a lack of deliberate intent, and demonstrate that the actions were reasonable at the time and not intended to cause insolvency. Explicit fraud and embezzlement, involving concealment or presenting fraudulent liabilities, are defined separately, as are the less serious deceitfulness and violation by a debtor.

An example was a case involving the former CEO of the National Workers' Savings Bank as the debtor. The debtor was ordered to pay FIM 1.8 million in damages due to reckless lending that had led to a bankruptcy of the bank. However, the debtor kept multiple credit accounts overdrawn by withdrawing large sums of cash, which he claimed were for daily expenses and frequent travel abroad. Thus, garnishment was not possible, because he could claim that he had no net worth. The court found it unlikely that such sums could be spent on daily expenses, but were in fact stashed somewhere, and convicted the debtor of aggravated debtor's dishonesty.

In Swedish law, dishonesty to creditors (oredlighet mot borgenärer) and aggravated dishonesty to creditors (grov oredlighet mot borgenärer) carry a sentence of up to two and a half years and six years of imprisonment, respectively.

== Studies ==
A 2021 study by Fixgerald which tested academic cheating found that the USA was the most dishonest country.

== See also ==
- Confidence trick
- English law
- False accusation
- Feigned madness
- Half-truth
- Intellectual dishonesty
- Knowledge falsification
- Piracy
- R v Ghosh
- Shoplifting
- Shrinkage (accounting)
