= Ignorantia juris non excusat =

Ignorance of the law is no excuse

In law, ignorantia juris non excusat (Latin for 'ignorance of the law excuses not'), or ignorantia legis neminem excusat ('ignorance of law excuses no one'), is a legal principle holding that a person who is unaware of a law may not escape liability for violating that law merely by being unaware of its content.

European-law countries with a tradition of Roman law may also use an expression from Aristotle translated into Latin: nemo censetur ignorare legem ('nobody is thought to be ignorant of the law') or ignorantia iuris nocet ('not knowing the law is harmful').

== Synopsis ==
The rationale of the doctrine is that if ignorance were an excuse, a person charged with criminal offenses or a subject of a civil lawsuit would merely claim that one was unaware of the law in question to avoid liability, even if that person really does know what the law in question is. Thus, the law imputes knowledge of all laws to all persons within the jurisdiction no matter how transiently. Although it would be impossible, even for someone with substantial legal training, to be aware of every law in operation in every aspect of a state's activities, this is the price paid to ensure that willful blindness cannot become the basis of exculpation. Thus, it is well settled that persons engaged in any undertakings outside what is common for a normal person will make themselves aware of the laws necessary to engage in that undertaking. If they do not, they cannot complain if they incur liability.

The doctrine assumes that the law in question has been properly promulgated—published and distributed, for example, by being printed in a government gazette, made available over the Internet, or printed in volumes available for sale to the public at affordable prices. In the ancient phrase of Gratian, Leges instituuntur cum promulgantur ('Laws are instituted when they are promulgated'). For a law to obtain the binding force which is proper to a law, it must be applied to the men who have to be ruled by it. Such application is made by their being given notice by promulgation. A law can bind only when it is reasonably possible for those to whom it applies to acquire knowledge of it in order to observe it, even if actual knowledge of the law is absent for a particular individual. A secret law is no law at all.

In criminal law, although ignorance may not clear a defendant of guilt, it can be a consideration in sentencing, particularly where the law is unclear or the defendant sought advice from law enforcement or regulatory officials. For example, in one Canadian case, a person was charged with being in possession of gambling devices after they had been advised by customs officials that it was legal to import such devices into Canada. Although the defendant was convicted, the sentence was an absolute discharge.

In addition, there were, particularly in the days before satellite communication and cellular phones, persons who could genuinely be ignorant of the law due to distance or isolation. For example, in a case in British Columbia, four hunters were acquitted of game offenses where the law was changed during the period they were in the wilderness hunting. Another case, in early English law, involved a seaman on a clipper before the invention of radio who had shot another. Although he was found guilty, he was pardoned, as the law had been changed while he was at sea.

Although ignorance of the law, like other mistakes of law, is not a defence, a mistake of fact may well be, depending on the circumstances: that is, the false but sincerely held belief in a factual state of affairs which, had it been the case, would have made the conduct innocent in law.

Presumed knowledge of the law is the principle in jurisprudence that one is bound by a law even if one does not know of it. The concept comes from Roman law, and is expressed in the brocard ignorantia legis non excusat. The essential public character of a law requires that the law, once properly promulgated, must apply to anyone in the jurisdiction where the law applies. Thus, no one can justify their conduct on the grounds that they were not aware of the law.

Generally, a convention exists by which the laws are issued and rendered accessible by methods, authors and means that are simple and well known: the law is readable in certain places (some systems prescribe that a collection of the laws is copied in every local city council), is made by certain authorities (usually sovereign, government, parliament, and derivative bodies), and enters into effect in certain ways (many systems for instance prescribe a certain number of days—often 15—after issue). This is commonly intended as a constitutional regulation, and in fact many constitutions or statutes exactly describe the correct procedures.

However, some recent interpretations weaken this concept. Particularly in civil law, regard can be had to the difficulty of being informed of the existence of a law considering the lifestyle of the average citizen. On the penal side, the quality of the knowledge of the law can affect the evaluation of the animus nocendi or the mens rea, in that certain subjective conditions can weaken personal responsibility.

The theme was widely discussed, also for political reasons, at the time of the Enlightenment and in the 18th century, given the heavy proportion of illiterate citizens in European countries (who would have some difficulties being aware of all the laws in a country). It was then argued that both the presumed knowledge and the heavily increasing corpus of national legislation were working in favour of lawyers rather than citizens.

In recent times, some authors have considered this concept as an extension of (or at least as analogous to) the other ancient concept (typical of criminal law) that no one can be punished under a law that was issued after the action was committed (non-retroactivity of the law. See ex post facto). This interpretation is however disputed, given that the matter would hierarchically more properly refer to a constitutional doctrine rather than to a civil or penal one.

Some modern criminal statutes contain language such as stipulating that the act must be done "knowingly and wittingly" or "with unlawful intent", or some similar language. However, this does not refer to ignorance of laws, but having criminal intent.

== History ==
=== Jewish tradition ===
The doctrine, "Ignorance of the law is no excuse", first shows up in the Bible in Leviticus 5:17: "And if any one sin, and do any of the things which Jehovah hath commanded not to be done; though he knew it not, yet is he guilty, and shall bear his iniquity." Mosaic law holds that people who violated God's laws unintentionally must be held accountable.

=== Greco-Roman tradition ===
An alternate explanation of the origin of the maxim can be found in the philosophy of the Greeks and Romans. Such were cultures heavily influenced by customary legal systems. Within such a system, law is learned as a person participates in the culture and customs of the community.

The Minos dialogue, which has been attributed to Plato, reports the following conversation between Socrates and his companion:

Socrates: "Come then, do you consider just things to be unjust and unjust things just, or just things to be just and unjust things unjust?"
Companion: "I consider just things to be just, and unjust things unjust."
Socrates: "And are they so considered among all men elsewhere as they are here?"
Companion: "Yes."
Socrates: "Are things that weigh more considered heavier here, and things that weigh less lighter, or the contrary?"
Companion: "No, those that weigh more are considered heavier, and those that weigh less lighter."
Socrates: "And is it so in Carthage also, and in Lycaea?"
Companion: "Yes."
Socrates: "Noble things, it would seem, are everywhere considered noble, and base things base; not base things noble or noble things base."
Companion: "That is so."

As Roman law was derived from the customs of the Italian tribes, and these customs had rules reasonable people would know, ignorance was not a defense. Conversely, ignorance of civil rules that were not as common-sense was a defense for women, young men, soldiers, peasants, and people legally declared incompetent. In the 1st century BC, Cicero wrote the following in De re publica (On the Republic):

True law is right reason conformable to nature, universal, unchangeable, eternal, whose commands urge us to duty, and whose prohibitions restrain us from evil. Whether it enjoins or forbids, the good respect its injunctions, and the wicked treat them with indifference. This law cannot be contradicted by any other law, and is not liable either to derogation or abrogation. Neither the senate nor the people can give us any dispensation for not obeying this universal law of justice. It needs no other expositor and interpreter than our own conscience. It is not one thing at Rome, and another at Athens; one thing to-day, and another to-morrow; but in all times and nations this universal law must forever reign, eternal and imperishable. It is the sovereign master and emperor of all beings. God himself is its author, its promulgator, its enforcer. And he who does not obey it flies from himself, and does violence to the very nature of man. And by so doing he will endure the severest penalties even if he avoid the other evils which are usually accounted punishments.

=== English tradition ===
Chief Justice of the Common Pleas Serjeant Edward Coke wrote in the Preface to his Institutes of the Laws of England that: "I cannot conjecture that the general communication of these laws in the English tongue can work any inconvenience, but introduce great profit, seeing that Ignorantia juris non excusat, Ignorance of the law execuseth not. And herein I am justified by the wisdom of a parliament; the words whereof be [36 Edward III cap 15, Reasons why the Laws should be pleaded in the English tongue which comes down to us from the year 1362],

That the laws and customs of this realm the rather should be reasonably perceived and known, and better understood by the tongue used in this realm, and by so much every man might the better govern himself without offending of the law, and the better keep, save and defend his heritage, and possessions. And in divers regions and countries where the king, the nobles, and other of the said realm have been, good governance and full right is done to every man, because that the laws and customs be learned and used in the tongue of the country.

The Jacobean English jurist John Selden, co-author of the Petition of Right, wrote in his memoirs that "Ignorance of the law excuses no man; not that all men know the law, but because 'tis an excuse every man will plead, and no man can tell how to confute him."

The 18th century British commentarist William Blackstone has in his fourth volume: "ignorantia juris, quod quisque tenetur scire, non excusat, is as well as the maxim of our own law, as it was of the Roman."

== Modern law ==
This principle is stated in modern statute law for example:

- Brazil:
  - Article 3 of the Law of Introduction to Brazilian Law Norms.
  - Article 21 of the Brazilian Penal Code.
- Canada: Criminal Code, section 19
- Chile: Chilean Civil Code, articles 7 and 8.
- Philippines: Republic Act No. 386 "Civil Code of the Philippines", Article 3

=== US exceptions ===
In some jurisdictions, there are exceptions to the general rule that ignorance of the law is not a valid defense. For example, under U.S. Federal criminal tax law, the element of willfulness required by the provisions of the Internal Revenue Code has been ruled by the courts to correspond to a "voluntary, intentional violation of a known legal duty" under which an "actual good faith belief based on a misunderstanding caused by the complexity of the tax law" is a valid legal defense. See Cheek v. United States.

In Lambert v. California (1957), the Supreme Court of the United States ruled that a person who is unaware of a malum prohibitum law cannot be convicted of violating it if there was no probability they could have known the law existed. It was subsequently ruled in United States v. Freed (1971) that this exception does not apply when a reasonable person would expect their actions to be regulated, such as when possessing narcotics or dangerous weapons.

In Heien v. North Carolina (2014), the Supreme Court held that even if a police officer incorrectly believes that a person has violated the law due to a mistaken understanding of the law, the officer's "reasonable suspicion" that a law was being broken does not violate the Fourth Amendment.

== See also ==
- Edict of government
- Indeterminacy debate in legal theory
- Imputation (law)
- Mistake of law
- Problem of the criterion
- Rule-following paradox
- Rules of inference
- Secret law
- Qualified immunity

== Bibliography ==
- "Ignorantia Legis Neminem Excusat", Manitoba Law Journal, Vol. 2, Issue 10 (October 1885), pp. 145–157.
- Nuhiu, Agim; Ademi, Naser; Emruli, Safet, "Ignorantia Legis Neminem Excusat in the Area of Equality and Non-Discrimination—The Case of Macedonia", Journal of Law, Policy and Globalization, Vol. 43, pp. 62–66.
- Van Warmelo, P., "Ignorantia Iuris, Tijdschrift voor Rechtsgeschiedenis/Legal History Review, Vol. 22, Issue 1 (1954), pp. 1–32.
- Volcker, Sven B., "Ignorantia Legis non Excusat and the Demise of National Procedural Autonomy in the Application of the EU Competition Rules: Schenker", Common Market Law Review, Vol. 51, Issue 5 (October 2014), pp. 1497–1520.
