= Ivey v Genting Casinos =

UK legal case on dishonesty and gambling

- Court: Supreme Court
- Full case name: Ivey v Genting Casinos (UK) Ltd t/a Crockfords
- Decided: 25 October 2017
- Citation: [2017] UKSC 67, [2018] AC 391, [2017] 3 WLR 1212, [2018] 2 All ER 406, [2018] 1 Cr App R 12
- Cases cited: R v Ghosh

Court membership
- Judges sitting: Lord Neuberger, Lady Hale, Lord Kerr, Lord Hughes, Lord Thomas

Keywords
- casinos, cheating at gambling, dishonesty, gambling, gambling contracts, implied terms

Ivey v Genting Casinos (UK) Ltd t/a Crockfords [2017] UKSC 67 is a highly significant UK Supreme Court case. Although the dispute regarded breach of contract, the court used the opportunity to address the criminal law test for dishonesty – viewing the divergence of civil and criminal tests to be undesirable.

== Facts ==
Phil Ivey, an American professional poker player, played and won a series of games of Punto Banco—a variant of baccarat—at Crockfords Casino in London, owned by Genting Casinos (UK) Ltd. The casino did not pay out the £7.7m he had won, as they believed Ivey had cheated by using edge sorting, as well as convincing the croupier to keep used decks in play to take full advantage of this method. Ivey sued the casino to recover his winnings and freely admitted at trial how he had won.

Both Ivey and the casino agreed that the contract contained an implied term forbidding cheating. Ivey argued that the appropriate test for whether cheating occurred was the same for contract as it was in section 42 of the Gambling Act 2005, and that in a criminal law context this necessitated dishonesty, which had not been shown.

Under the two-part Ghosh test, dishonesty was first determined by what the reasonable person considered to be dishonest, and secondly whether the defendant knew his actions to be dishonest. Ivey maintained he did not believe his actions to be dishonest.

At trial, High Court Judge John Mitting accepted that Ivey did not consider his own actions cheating, but held that cheating had nonetheless occurred and the contract was thus breached. The Court of Appeal upheld the trial judge's ruling 2–1 on 3 November 2016, ruling that dishonesty is not a necessary element of 'cheating'.

== Judgment ==
The decision of the Supreme Court can be understood in two parts; the definition of 'cheating' and the definition of 'dishonesty'.

=== Cheating ===
The court agreed that 'cheating' in a gambling contract would have the same meaning as s42 of the Gambling Act 2005, but that the section leaves open what the concept may apply to. The court emphasised that to determine the appeal they need not provide a comprehensive definition of cheating, but determine whether dishonesty was required as an element of it. The court held that not all cheating would be dishonest and that it is not helpful to add dishonesty to the definition, giving the following example at [45]:

The runner who trips up one of his opponents is unquestionably cheating, but it is doubtful that such misbehaviour would ordinarily attract the epithet "dishonest".

Key to the decision was that Ivey not only noticed and took advantage of the differences on the cards, but took steps to defeat the random nature of the game through his influence on the croupier. This was inevitably cheating. Additionally, the court determined that this manipulation of the croupier was deceptive and, had they accepted dishonesty to be an element of cheating, this conduct would satisfy the first part of the Ghosh test.

=== Dishonesty ===
Although not determinative to the case at hand, the court discussed dishonesty at length. The court viewed the Ghosh test as a 'mixed test', being objective in its first part but subjective in the second. The second part was considered to be an issue primarily for the reason that a defendant convinced of the honesty of their actions is entitled to be acquitted, no matter how blatantly wrong their conduct is to other people. The court held that in cases of mistake, for example where a person believes something to be free when it is not, the first part of the Ghosh test would excuse this conduct because the reasonable person cannot say that such a mistake is dishonest.

In essence, they believed the test to be backwards. They found it wrong to first ask whether conduct is dishonest and then ask if it can be excused in the defendant's own mind. Rather the jury must ascertain what the defendant understood about the situation and ask if under the circumstances their conduct was dishonest. The court preferred the objective test stated in Twinsectra Ltd v Yardley, and saw no reason for the test to differ between civil and criminal law.

As the criminal definition of dishonesty was not necessary to determine the case, there is no doubt that this part of the judgment was obiter.

The appeal was dismissed.

== Significance ==
In the High Court case of DPP v Patterson, Sir Brian Leveson observed that:

Given the terms of the unanimous observations of the Supreme Court expressed by Lord Hughes, who does not shy from asserting that Ghosh does not correctly represent the law, it is difficult to imagine the Court of Appeal preferring Ghosh to Ivey in the future.

Due to the directions regarding dishonesty being obiter, considerable uncertainty followed the decision. While it was clear that the Supreme Court intended its directions on the proper test for dishonesty to be followed in future, it would be contrary to principles of precedent for a decision on an issue not before the court to be binding on lower courts. In R v Barton and Booth, the Court of Appeal took the much criticised approach that the Supreme Court had altered the rules of precedent to allow clear directions to be binding despite being obiter.

The new test for dishonesty was affirmed, and some clarity was brought to which factors are to be considered in the first part of the test. Here the test for dishonesty was stated to be:

(a) what was the defendant's actual state of knowledge or belief as to the facts; and (b) was his conduct dishonest by the standards of ordinary decent people?

David Ormerod and Karl Laird criticised the direction of the law following Ivey, arguing that the lack of a subjective element will lead to uncertainty and a possible human rights challenge under Article 7, citing a prior challenge to Ghosh.
