= Obtaining pecuniary advantage by deception =

Obtaining pecuniary advantage by deception was formerly a statutory offence in England and Wales and Northern Ireland. It was replaced with the more general offence of fraud by the Fraud Act 2006. The offence still exists in certain other common law jurisdictions which have copied the English criminal model.

== England and Wales ==
=== Statute ===
The offence was created by section 16 of the Theft Act 1968. At the time of its repeal it read:

- (1) A person who by any deception dishonestly obtains for himself or another any pecuniary advantage shall on conviction on indictment be liable to imprisonment for a term not exceeding five years.
- (2) The cases in which a pecuniary advantage within the meaning of this section is to be regarded as obtained for a person are cases where:—
  - (a) ...
  - (b) he is allowed to borrow by way of overdraft, or to take out any policy of insurance or annuity contract, or obtains an improvement of the terms on which he is allowed to do so; or
  - (c) he is given the opportunity to earn remuneration in an office or employment, or to win money by betting
- (3) For the purposes of this section "deception" has the same meaning as in section 15 of this Act.

This offence replaced the offence of obtaining credit by fraud, contrary to section 13(1) of the Debtors Act 1869.

The elements of the actus reus are similar to the offence of obtaining property by deception:

- There must be a deception. This has the same meaning as for section 15 (according to section 16(3) of the Theft Act 1968). See Deception (criminal law) and Obtaining property by deception § By any deception.
- There must be causation.
- There must be the obtaining of a pecuniary advantage.

==== Obtaining of a pecuniary advantage, s. 16(2) ====
The expression "pecuniary advantage" was defined by section 16(2). The definition was "exclusive".

===== Section 16(2)(a) =====
Section 16(2)(a) read:

(a) any debt or charge for which he makes himself liable or is or may become liable (including one not legally enforceable) is reduced or in whole or in part evaded or deferred; [...]

See Director of Public Prosecutions v Turner [1974] AC 537, [1973] 3 WLR 352, 117 SJ 664, [1973] 3 All ER 124, 57 Cr App R 932, [1974] Crim LR 186, HL, reversing sub nom R v Turner [1973] 1 WLR 653.

In R v Royle, Lord Edmund-Davies described it as "a juridical nightmare". It was replaced with the offence of evasion of liability by deception by section 2 of the Theft Act 1978, subsequently itself replaced with the general offence of fraud by the 2006 Act.

===== Section 16(2)(b) =====
Section 16(2)(b) covers the situation in Metropolitan Police Commissioner v Charles where writing the cheque backed by a card obtains an unauthorised overdraft even though the deception operates on the mind of the person accepting the cheque and not on the mind of a bank officer. In most cases, the granting of credit may be machine-based with reference to a bank officer only being made when larger sums of money are involved. Where the pecuniary advantage is the obtaining of an overdraft facility at a bank, it is only necessary to shew that the facility was granted, not that the defendant actually used the facility.

====== "Policy of insurance or annuity contract" ======
This included a policy or contract that was void due to the mistake induced by the deception.

See the following cases:

- R v Kovacs, [1974] 1 WLR 370, [1974] 1 All ER 1236, 118 SJ 116, sub nom R v Kovacs (Stephanie Janika), 58 Cr App R 412, [1974] Crim LR 183, CA
- R v Watkins [1976] 1 All ER 578, Crown Court
- R v Waites [1982] Crim LR 369, CA
- R v Bevan, 84 Cr App R 143, [1987] Crim LR 129, CA

===== Section 16(2)(c) =====
Section 16(2)(c) clearly covers those people who claim to have qualifications which are in fact false, and because of these qualifications they are employed. Further, according to R v Callender where a self-employed accountant made deceptions, the section was held to apply equally to employment as an independent contractor and employment as a servant. The defendant is charged under section 16 if the deception is detected before payment is made. Thereafter, the defendant has obtained payment under section 15. As to betting shops, if the defendant goes into the shop just before the horse race is due to start, places the bet and very slowly begins to count out the stake money as the commentary relays the progress of the horses, the opportunity to win has been obtained and the defendant can be convicted if they pick up the money and run out when it becomes obvious the nominated horse will not win.

See the following cases:

- R v Aston and Hadley [1970] 1 WLR 1584, [1970] 3 All ER 1045, 55 Cr App R 48, CA
- R v McNiff [1986] Crim LR 57, CA

Section 16 was repealed on 15 January 2007 by Schedule 3 to the Fraud Act 2006.

=== Mens rea ===
There are two elements to the mens rea of this offence:

- there must be a deliberate or reckless deception (see Deception (criminal law) and Obtaining property by deception#By any deception)
- the defendant must be dishonest (see Dishonesty and Obtaining property by deception#Dishonestly)

But there is no need to prove an intention to permanently deprive.

=== Liability for offences by corporations ===
Section 18 of the Theft Act 1968 applied in relation to section 16.

=== Mode of trial ===
As to mode of trial from 1968 to 1977, see paragraph 11 of Schedule 1 to the Magistrates' Courts Act 1952 (as substituted by section 29(2) of the Theft Act 1968)

From 1977, obtaining pecuniary advantage by deception was triable either way.

== Northern Ireland ==
This offence was created by section 16 of the Theft Act (Northern Ireland) 1969.

Section 16(2)(a) was replaced with the offence of evasion of liability by deception by the Theft (Northern Ireland) Order 1978 (S.I. 1978/1407 (N.I. 23)). That Order in Council mostly implemented the same provisions as the 1978 Act in Northern Ireland.

Section 16 was repealed on 15 January 2007 by sections 14(1) and 15(1)(4) of, and paragraph 1(c)(iii) of Schedule 1 to, and Schedule 3 to, the Fraud Act 2006. The repeal was subject to transitional provisions and savings contained in paragraph 3 of Schedule 2 to that Act.

=== Visiting forces ===
This offence was an offence against property for the purposes of section 3 of the Visiting Forces Act 1952.
