= Genocide law =

Genocide law may refer to:

- Genocide Convention, an international genocide law adopted by the United Nations General Assembly in 1948
- Treatment of genocide under municipal laws of individual jurisdictions
- Genocide Law (Albania), an Albanian law, enacted in 1995 and repealed in 1997

== See also ==
- International human rights law
