= Deception (criminal law) =

Legal term of art in England, Wales and Ireland

"Deception" was a legal term of art used in the definition of statutory offences in England and Wales and Northern Ireland. It is a legal term of art in Ireland.

Until 2007, in England and Wales, the main deception offences were defined in the Theft Act 1968 and the Theft Act 1978. The basic pattern of deception offences was established in the Theft Act 1968, and was then amended in the Theft Act 1978 and the Theft (Amendment) Act 1996 which addressed some of the problems that had arisen in the enforcement of the law.

== England and Wales ==
=== Definition ===
Section 15(4) of the Theft Act 1968 read:

For the purposes of this section "deception" means any deception (whether deliberate or reckless) by words or conduct as to fact or as to law, including a deception as to the present intentions of the person using the deception or any other person.

This definition applied to the following offences:

- obtaining property by deception, contrary to section 15 of the Theft Act 1968
- obtaining a money transfer by deception, contrary to section 15A of the Theft Act 1968
- obtaining pecuniary advantage by deception, contrary to section 16 of the Theft Act 1968
- Procuring the execution of a valuable security by deception, contrary to section 20(2) of the Theft Act 1968
- obtaining services by deception, contrary to section 1 of the Theft Act 1978
- evasion of liability by deception, contrary to section 2 of the Theft Act 1978

Sections 15, 15A, 16 and 20(2) of the Theft Act 1968, and sections 1 and 2 of the Theft Act 1978, were repealed on 15 January 2007 by the Fraud Act 2006.

The offences listed above have been called "deception offences".

==== Deliberate or reckless ====
A deception will be deliberate when the defendant knows that what he represents as true is untrue. This is predominantly a subjective test, matching the general approach to establishing intentional behaviour. The test of recklessness is also predominantly subjective to show that the defendant is aware that what is represented may or may not be true, excluding the extended meaning of recklessness in R v Caldwell [1982] AC 341.

==== Words or conduct ====
Deceptions are most commonly made by saying or not saying something significant, as in the advance fee fraud, in which the defendant tells the victim that he is a rich person who needs discreetly to move money abroad, and wants to use the victim's bank account in return for a percentage of the money transferred. Mere conduct, however, can also imply facts which are untrue. Thus, wearing a particular uniform represents that the person is employed in that occupation, or writing a cheque supported by a cheque card represents that the writer has actual authority from the bank to use the card and that the bank will honour the cheque (see Metropolitan Police Commissioner v. Charles). If the defendant's words or conduct innocently represent something that later becomes untrue, or the defendant becomes aware the "victim" has made a mistake, they are obligated to correct the misunderstanding. Failure to do so can amount to deception.

In Director of Public Prosecutions v. Ray the defendant, after eating in a restaurant, decided not to pay for a meal. The defendant continued to sit quietly, lulling the waiters into believing payment would be made in due course, and thereby obtained the opportunity to leave without paying. Consequently, silence or an omission can be a continuing representation that nothing material has changed and so be a deception.

This reasoning has also been applied to the offence of obtaining a service by deception, contrary to section 1 of the Theft Act 1978. In R. v. Rai, the defendant applied for a grant to adapt the house of his infirm mother. After the work had commenced, he failed to inform the local authority that his mother had died, and thereby obtained completion of the work. His conduct, taken as a whole, amounted to a continuing representation that she was alive.

==== Fact or law ====
Most deceptions relate to actual or supposed facts, or to an existing state of affairs, but this is distinguished from a false statement of opinion which, no matter how persuasive, is not a deception. Deception offences include situations where the defendant represents that counterfeited goods are genuine items, or misrepresents their identity (e.g., R v Barnard, where the defendant represented that he was a student to an Oxford bookshop to qualify for their scheme of discounting books to students), or asserts that an envelope contains money. Statements may appear equivocal and still be a deception. Thus, in R v King [1979] CLR 279 the defendant admitted that the mileage on a car he was selling might not be correct. He had actually altered the odometer, so this statement was true, but he was properly convicted because in a second statement, he claimed not to know whether the odometer was correct, which was false.

Similarly, a man dressed as a police officer who instructs someone to act in a particular way because 'the law requires it,' or a lawyer or accountant who relies on their professional status to mislead a client as to the law for their private benefit, deceives even though the general policy of English law is ignorantia juris non excusat, i.e. the Latin for ignorance of the law does not excuse and so everyone is presumed to know what the law is.

==== Present intentions ====
In Director of Public Prosecutions v Ray, the defendant who sits in a restaurant impliedly represents that they intend to pay for the meal. This is a representation as to present intention and it would be a deception whether the defendant has sufficient money to pay. It is distinguishable from the defendants who hide their money so that they can represent an inability to pay (a misrepresentation as to fact).

=== Deception and theft ===
There is an inevitable overlap between the general offence of theft, contrary to section 1(1), and these offences because they cover both general and specific situations in which the defendant will appropriate property by using some form of deception. Deception offences are separately defined to avoid any problems that might arise when the "victim" consents to the taking. Because the effect of the deception may be to persuade the owner to pass title to the goods, albeit on a voidable title, those goods may not "belong to another" at the time of the appropriation. In fact, strong authority has emerged that this is not a real problem because an appropriation is the "assumption" of the rights of ownership, whether that assumption is effective in law: see R v Gomez [1993] AC 442. This case has been criticised because it apparently eliminates the need for the section 15 offence. Yet the deception offences are preserved and are the preferred charges in situations involving deceptive behaviour both because theft carries a lower minimum sentence, and as a matter of general principle, because a charge should describe what the defendant actually did in the simplest and most direct form.

== Ireland ==
Sections 2(1) and (2) of the Criminal Justice (Theft and Fraud Offences) Act 2001 provide a definition of deception. It applies to the following offences:

- Making gain or causing loss by deception, contrary to section 6 of the Criminal Justice (Theft and Fraud Offences) Act 2001
- Obtaining services by deception, contrary to section 7 of the Criminal Justice (Theft and Fraud Offences) Act 2001
- Procuring the execution of a valuable security by deception, contrary to section 11(2)(a) of the Criminal Justice (Theft and Fraud Offences) Act 2001
