= Obtaining services by deception =

Criminal offence in the Republic of Ireland

Obtaining services by deception is a statutory offence in the Republic of Ireland. It has been abolished in England and Wales and Northern Ireland.

== England and Wales ==
See Theft Act 1978#Section 1 - Obtaining services by deception.

== Northern Ireland ==
This offence was created by article 3 of the Theft (Northern Ireland) Order 1978 (S.I. 1978/1407 (N.I. 23)). That article was repealed on 15 January 2007 by sections 14(1) and (3) and 15(1) of, and paragraph 1(d)(i) of Schedule 1 to, and Schedule 3 to, the Fraud Act 2006, subject to transitional provisions and savings in paragraph 3 of Schedule 2 to that Act.

Mode of trial

See article 6(1).

Sentence

A person guilty of this offence was liable, on conviction on indictment, to imprisonment for a term not exceeding five years, or, on summary conviction, to imprisonment for a term not exceeding six months, or to a fine not exceeding £1000, or to both.

== Republic of Ireland ==
This offence is created by section 7 of the Criminal Justice (Theft and Fraud Offences) Act 2001

== See also ==
- Deception (criminal law)
