= Theft Act 1978 =

Act of the Parliament of the United Kingdom

Theft Act 1978 (Note: Section 7(1).)
- Act of Parliament
- Parliament of the United Kingdom
- Long title: An Act to replace section 16(2)(a) of the Theft Act 1968 with other provision against fraudulent conduct; and for connected purposes.
- Citation: 1978 c. 31
- Territorial extent: England and Wales (Note: Section 7(3).)

Dates
- Royal assent: 20 July 1978
- Commencement: 20 October 1978 (Note: Section 7(2).)

Other legislation
- Amends: Theft Act 1968
- Amended by: Magistrates' Courts Act 1980; Extradition Act 1989; Serious Organised Crime and Police Act 2005; Fraud Act 2006

Status: Amended

Text of statute as originally enacted

Revised text of statute as amended

Text of the Theft Act 1978 as in force today (including any amendments) within the United Kingdom, from legislation.gov.uk.

The Theft Act 1978 (c. 31) is an act of the Parliament of the United Kingdom. It supplemented the earlier deception offences contained in sections 15 and 16 of the Theft Act 1968 by reforming some aspects of those offences and adding new provisions. See also the Fraud Act 2006.

== Section 1 - Obtaining services by deception ==
This section created the offence of obtaining services by deception. It was repealed on 15 January 2007 by Schedule 3 to the Fraud Act 2006. As amended by the Theft (Amendment) Act 1996, it read:

(1) A person who by any deception dishonestly obtains services from another shall be guilty of an offence.
(2) It is an obtaining of services where the other is induced to confer a benefit by doing some act, or causing or permitting some act to be done, on the understanding that the benefit has been or will be paid for.
(3) Without prejudice to the generality of subsection (2) above, it is an obtaining of services where the other is induced to make a loan, or to cause or permit a loan to be made, on the understanding that any payment (whether by way of interest or otherwise) will be or has been made in respect of the loan.

There must be a deception which, according to section 5(1), has the same meaning as in section 15(4) of the Theft Act 1968, i.e. any deception (whether deliberate or reckless) by words or conduct as to fact or as to law, including a deception as to the present intentions of the person using the deception or any other person. This deception must be the cause of the obtaining (see the discussion on causation in Deception (criminal law) and Obtaining property by deception#By any deception).

The defendant must obtain a service as defined in section 1(2), i.e. the victim must confer a benefit on the defendant (or another). The 'services' must be non-gratuitous, i.e. the benefits must be provided by the victim of the deception in the expectation that they are to be paid for at commercial rates (see section 1(2)). It must be conferred by the doing, causing, or permitting of some act. A failure to act that confers a benefit is not sufficient. Thus, a person who employs a lawyer or accountant without ever intending to pay, may commit an offence under section 1. But a person who lies to a neighbour to secure the loan of a power drill does not commit an offence because the benefit is not obtained on the understanding that it has been or will be paid for. In R v Halai [1983] Crim LR 624, CA, the defendant made false statements in an application for a mortgage and thereby obtained a survey, the opening of an account and a mortgage advance. Note that the Theft (Amendment) Act 1996 introduced section 1(3) specifically to provide that a loan amounts to a service. This dispenses with that part of the decision in Halai (which had, in any event, been overruled by R v Graham prior to the act) As to the opening of an account, contrast R v Shortland [1995] Crim LR 893 in which the Court of Appeal held that, on the evidence presented, opening bank accounts under false names did not amount to the section 1 offence, but suggested that it might have done if evidence that it had to be paid for had been presented. The mens rea for all offences is dishonesty.

A person could commit this offence by obtaining services for another person.

As to obtaining of hire-purchase agreements, see R v Widdowson, 82 Cr App R 314, [1986] RTR 124, [1986] Crim LR 233, CA

The following cases are also relevant:

- R v Teong Sun Chuah and Teong Tatt Chuah [1991] Crim LR 463, CA
- R v Cooke (David) [1997] Crim LR 436, [1997] 4 CL 187, 3 Archbold News 2, CA
- R v Cummings-John [1997] Crim LR 660
- R v Naviede [1997] Crim LR 662, CA

Liability for offences by corporations

Section 18 of the Theft Act 1968 applied in relation to this section as it applied in relation to section 15 of the Theft Act 1968.

Mode of trial and sentence

This offence was triable either way. A person guilty of this offence was liable, on conviction on indictment to imprisonment for a term not exceeding five years, or, on summary conviction, to imprisonment for a term not exceeding six months, or to a fine not exceeding the prescribed sum, or to both.

== Section 2 – Evasion of liability by deception ==
This section created the offence of evasion of liability by deception. It was repealed on 15 January 2007 by Schedule 3 to the Fraud Act 2006. It read:

- (1) Subject to subsection (2) below, where a person by any deception
  - (a) dishonestly secures the remission of the whole or part of any existing liability to make a payment, whether his own liability or another's; or
  - (b) with intent to make permanent default in whole or in part on any existing liability to make a payment, or with intent to let another do so, dishonestly induces the creditor or any person claiming payment on behalf of the creditor to wait for payment (whether or not the due date for payment is deferred) or to forgo payment; or
  - (c) dishonestly obtains any exemption from or abatement of liability to make a payment;
  he shall be guilty of an offence.
- (2) For the purposes of this section 'liability' means legally enforceable liability; and subsection (1) shall not apply in relation to a liability that has not been accepted or established to pay compensation for a wrongful act or omission.
- (3) For purposes of subsection (1)(b) a person induced to take in payment a cheque or other security for money by way of conditional satisfaction of a pre-existing liability is to be treated not as being paid but as being induced to wait for payment.
- (4) For purposes of subsection (1)(c) "obtains" includes obtaining for another or enabling another to obtain.

Section 2(1) is divided into three parts, all of which require that both a deception caused the obtaining, which may be for oneself or for another, and that there is a legally enforceable liability. All three also require proof that the creditor is deceived into releasing the defendant from the obligation to pay in some way. (Contrast the previous law represented by Director of Public Prosecutions v Ray which, for policy reasons, held that merely running out of a restaurant without positively deceiving someone was nevertheless an offence.

As to the meaning of the words "with intent to make permanent default in whole or in part of any existing liability to make a payment" in section 2(1)(b), see R v Attewell-Hughes [1991] 1 WLR 955, [1991] 4 All ER 810, 93 Cr App R 132, [1991] Crim LR 437, CA.

See also R v Andrews and Hedges [1981] Crim LR 106.

=== Liability for offences by corporations ===
Section 18 of the Theft Act 1968 applied in relation to this section as it applied in relation to section 15 of the Theft Act 1968.

=== Remission of a debt ===
Section 2(1)(a) covers the deception that dishonestly secures the remission of the whole or part of an existing liability to make a payment. Unlike the other two subsections, this requires that the victim knows a liability exists, and knows how much they are remitting. It does not cover situations where the defendant tricks the victim into believing that no money is owed (sections 2(1)(b) and (c) do cover this situation). If A borrows £50 from B and, when repayment is due, claims that a change of circumstances makes it impossible for him to repay some or all of the money; this deception persuades B to forgive the loan, or to accept £10 in full satisfaction. In R v Jackson, Jackson tendered a stolen credit card to pay for petrol and other goods, and it was accepted by a trader, who then looked to the issuing credit card company for payment and not to the person tendering the card. This was held to dishonestly secure the remission of an existing liability and Jackson was convicted. For these purposes, the existing liability to make a payment may be the defendant's own liability or another's.

The provisions of section 2(2) clarify that section 2(1) does not apply where the liability has not been "accepted or established to pay compensation for a wrongful act or omission". This avoids the criminal law being a default liability for civil proceedings. Thus, if X lies about an accident to avoid a claim of negligence, no offence is committed. The claimant can commence civil proceedings once the deception is discovered.

=== Delaying payment of a debt ===
Like section 2(1)(a), this requires an existing liability to make payment but, unlike (a), it does not require that the creditor knows they are "letting the defendant off". In R v Holt and Lee, the defendants ate a meal in a restaurant that cost £3.65. When presented with the bill, they claimed another waitress had already taken a £5 note from the table. Unfortunately, an off-duty policeman had overheard their planning. They were both convicted of an attempt by deception to induce the creditor to forego payment with intent to make permanent default. Their appeal against conviction was dismissed. The section is also concerned with dishonestly inducing a creditor to wait for payment. In many circumstances, this means that sections 2(1)(a) and (b) will overlap, but there are also situations in which they do not. Thus, creditors who remit will also forgo.

A particular instance of "wait for payment" is provided by section 2(3), which was a necessary amendment because of the general principle that accepting a cheque (even a worthless cheque) as the means of payment, means that, until the creditor receives notice that the cheque has been dishonoured, they stop seeking payment: see R v Hammond. Section 2(3) provides that a person induced to take a cheque or other security for money by way of conditional satisfaction of an existing liability is to be treated not as being paid but as being induced to wait for payment. As mens rea, the defendant must make the deception with intent to make permanent default in whole or in part on any existing liability to make a payment of his own, or with intent to let another do so.

=== Avoiding incurring a debt ===
For there to be an offence under section 2(1)(c) there must be dishonesty and a deception that obtains some exemption from or abatement of liability to make a payment. Because both sections 2(1)(a) and (b) require an "existing" liability to pay, they do not cover situations where the point of the deception is to prevent a liability from arising in the future. Section 2(1)(c) would apply when a person flags down a taxi and claims only to have £5. The driver agrees to carry the passenger to the destination for this amount. The contract is made for a reduced amount, which is an "abatement" for these purposes. If the driver agreed to carry for no charge, this would be an "exemption". The Criminal Law Revision Committee (CLRC) gave examples where the defendant dishonestly obtained a rate rebate or a reduction in rent for the future. Another example would be waving a credit card at a ticket collector at a railway station to avoid having to pay to board the train. In roader than previous two offences as not limited to existing liabilities. In R v Firth, the defendant failed to tell the NHS that patients using NHS facilities were in fact private patients thereby obtaining facilities without payment (an example of an omission or silence constituting the deception). In R v Sibartie [1983] Crim LR 470, CA, the defendant was convicted of attempting section 2(1)(c) when he deceived a ticket collector on the underground into believing that he had paid for the whole of his journey. In fact, he had only purchased tickets for the first few and last few stations in his journey. The court of first instance said that that was a dishonest attempt to obtain an exemption from the liability to pay the excess. On appeal, it was argued that this was an attempt to induce the creditor to forgo payment of part under section 2(1)(b). The Court of Appeal held that although this illustrated the overlap between section 2(1)(b) and section 2(1)(c), it did not make liability under section 2(1)(c) wrong.

=== Mode of trial and sentence ===
This offence was triable either way. A person guilty of this offence was liable, on conviction on indictment to imprisonment for a term not exceeding five years, or, on summary conviction, to imprisonment for a term not exceeding six months, or to a fine not exceeding the prescribed sum, or to both.

== Section 3 - Making off without payment ==
This section creates the offence of making off without payment. It provides:

(1) Subject to subsection (3) below, a person who, knowing that payment on the spot for any goods supplied or service done is required or expected from him, dishonestly makes off without having paid as required or expected and with intent to avoid payment of the amount due shall be guilty of an offence.
(2) For purposes of this section 'payment on the spot' includes payment at the time of collecting goods on which work has been done, or in respect of which service has been provided.
(3) Subsection (1) above shall not apply where the supply of the goods or the doing of the service is contrary to law, or where the service done is such that payment is not legally enforceable.

The following subsection was repealed by the Serious Organised Crime and Police Act 2005:

(4) Any person may arrest without warrant anyone who is, or whom he, with reasonable cause, suspects to be, committing or attempting to commit an offence under this section."

This offence is triable either way. A person guilty of this offence is liable, on conviction on indictment to imprisonment for a term not exceeding two years, or, on summary conviction, to imprisonment for a term not exceeding six months, or to a fine not exceeding the prescribed sum, or to both.

In R v Allen, the House of Lords said that, in order for the offence to be committed, there must be "an intention to permanently deprive" by making off, and that a mere "intention to defer" payment is not sufficient. In theory, a person could eat a meal at a restaurant, not pay, but leave his name and address in order for the restaurant to start civil recovery procedures against him - as long as the details were correct, and he did intend to pay at some point in the future (by way of civil recovery) then no offence under Section 3 would be committed.

== Section 4 - Punishments ==
Section 4(2)(a) was repealed on 15 January 2007 by Schedule 3 to the Fraud Act 2006.

== Section 5 - Supplementary ==
Section 5(1) was repealed on 15 January 2007 by Schedule 3 to the Fraud Act 2006.

Section 5(3) was repealed by section 37(1) of, and Schedule 2 to, the Extradition Act 1989.

== Section 6 - Enactment of the same provisions for Northern Ireland ==
See the Theft (Northern Ireland) Order 1978 (S.I. 1978/1407 (N.I. 23)).

== Section 7 - Short title, commencement and extent ==
Section 7(2) provides that the act came into force at the end of the period of three months that began on the date on which it was passed. The word "months" means calendar months. The day (that is to say, 20 July 1978) on which the act was passed (that is to say, received royal assent) is included in the period of three months. This means that the act came into force on 20 October 1978. The act does not extend to Scotland or to Northern Ireland.
