= Genocide Act 1969 =

Act of the Parliament of the United Kingdom

Genocide Act 1969 (Note: Section 4(1).)
- Act of Parliament
- Parliament of the United Kingdom
- Long title: An Act to give effect to the Convention on the Prevention and Punishment of the Crime of Genocide.
- Citation: 1969 c. 12
- Territorial extent: United Kingdom

Dates
- Royal assent: 27 March 1969
- Commencement: 27 March 1969 (Note: The Acts of Parliament (Commencement) Act 1793.)
- Repealed: England and Wales and Northern Ireland: 1 September 2001; Scotland: 17 December 2001
Other legislation
Amends	Army Act 1955; Air Force Act 1955; Naval Discipline Act 1957; County Courts Act (Northern Ireland) 1959; Criminal Law Act 1967
Amended by	Judicature (Northern Ireland) Act 1978; Extradition Act 1989; Justice (Northern Ireland) Act 2002
Repealed by	International Criminal Court Act 2001

Status: Repealed

Text of statute as originally enacted

Revised text of statute as amended

The Genocide Act 1969 (c. 12) was an act of the Parliament of the United Kingdom. It gave effect to the Convention on the Prevention and Punishment of the Crime of Genocide approved by the General Assembly of the United Nations on 9 December 1948.

The whole act was repealed for England and Wales and Northern Ireland on 1 September 2001. It was repealed for Scotland on 17 December 2001.

As to the repeal of this act for the Isle of Man, see article 2(e) of the International Criminal Court Act 2001 (Isle of Man) Order 2004 (S.I. 2004/714).

As to application of this act to the British Antarctic Territory, see section 5(1)(b) of the Administration of Justice Ordinance 1990 (No 5).

Archbold Criminal Pleading, Evidence and Practice said that this Act made no provision in relation to jurisdiction and that it was "doubtful" that genocide committed by a British subject abroad was an offence under this Act.

== Section 1 - Genocide ==
The reference to the Advocate General for Northern Ireland in section 1(3) was substituted for the reference to the Attorney General for Northern Ireland on 12 April 2010 by paragraph 26 of schedule 7 to the Justice (Northern Ireland) Act 2002.

Section 1(3) was subject to section 12 of the Criminal Jurisdiction Act 1975.

Section 1(4) inserted paragraph 20 of List B of schedule 1 to the Criminal Law Act 1967. That schedule was repealed by Part IV of schedule 11 to the Courts Act 1971.

Section 1(5) was repealed by Part 1 of schedule 7 to the Judicature (Northern Ireland) Act 1978.

== Section 2 - Extradition and evidence for foreign courts ==
Section 2(1)(b), and the preceding "and", were repealed by section 170 of,schedule 16 to, the Criminal Justice Act 1988.

Section 2(1) was repealed by section 37 of, and schedule 2 to, the Extradition Act 1989.

The words "the Acts mentioned in subsection (1) of this section, the Extradition Act 1873 and" in section 2(2) were repealed by section 37 of, and schedule 2 to, the Extradition Act 1989.

== Section 3 - Application to Channel Islands, Isle of Man and colonies ==
The words "and sections 16 and 17 of the Fugitive Offenders Act 1967" in section 3(1) were repealed by section 170 of, and schedule 16 to, the Criminal Justice Act 1988.

Section 3(1) was substituted by section 36(2) of the Extradition Act 1989.

The power under section 3(2) was exercised by article 2 of the Genocide (Anguilla) Order 1987 (S.I. 1987/453).

== See also ==
- Genocide under municipal laws
