= List of parties to the Genocide Convention =

Participation in the Genocide Convention Signed and ratified Acceded or succeeded Only signed

The list of parties to the Genocide Convention encompasses the states who have signed and ratified or acceded to Convention on the Prevention and Punishment of the Crime of Genocide to prevent and punish actions of genocide in war and in peacetime.

On 11 December 1948, the Convention on the Prevention and Punishment of the Crime of Genocide was opened for signature. Ethiopia became the first state to deposit the treaty on 1 July 1949. Ethiopia was also among the very few countries that incorporated the convention in its national law immediately— as early as the 1950s. The treaty came into force and closed for signature on 12 January 1951. Since then, states that did not sign the treaty can now only accede to it. The instrument of ratification, accession, or succession is deposited with the Secretary-General of the United Nations

As of September 2026, 154 states have ratified or acceded to the treaty, most recently Djibouti in February 2026. One state, the Dominican Republic, has signed but not ratified the treaty.

== Ratified or acceded states ==
State	Signed	Deposited	Method
Afghanistan		22 Mar 1956	Accession
Albania		12 May 1955	Accession
Algeria		31 Oct 1963	Accession
Andorra		22 Sep 2006	Accession
Antigua and Barbuda		25 Oct 1988	Succession from United Kingdom
Argentina		5 Jun 1956	Accession
Armenia		23 Jun 1993	Accession
Australia	11 Dec 1948	8 Jul 1949	Ratification
Austria		19 Mar 1958	Accession
Azerbaijan		16 Aug 1996	Accession
Bahamas		5 Aug 1975	Succession from United Kingdom
Bahrain		27 Mar 1990	Accession
Bangladesh		5 Oct 1998	Accession
Barbados		14 Jan 1980	Accession
Belarus	16 Dec 1949	11 Aug 1954	Ratification as Byelorussian SSR
Belgium	12 Dec 1949	5 Sep 1951	Ratification
Belize		10 Mar 1998	Accession
Benin		2 Nov 2017	Accession
Bolivia	11 Dec 1948	14 Jun 2005	Ratification
Bosnia and Herzegovina		29 Dec 1992	Succession from Yugoslavia; Signed 11 December 1948; Ratified 29 August 1950
Brazil	11 Dec 1948	15 Apr 1952	Ratification
Bulgaria		21 Jul 1950	Accession
Burkina Faso		14 Sep 1965	Accession
Burundi		6 Jan 1997	Accession
Cambodia		14 Oct 1950	Accession
Canada	28 Nov 1949	3 Sep 1952	Ratification
Cape Verde		10 Oct 2011	Accession
Chile	11 Dec 1948	3 Jun 1953	Ratification
China	20 Jul 1949	18 Apr 1983	Ratification; Signed as Taiwan
Colombia	12 Aug 1949	27 Oct 1959	Ratification
Comoros		27 Sep 2004	Accession
Costa Rica		14 Oct 1950	Accession
Ivory Coast		18 Dec 1995	Accession
Croatia		12 Oct 1992	Succession from Yugoslavia; Signed 11 December 1948; Ratified 29 August 1950
Cuba	28 Dec 1949	4 Mar 1953	Ratification
Cyprus		29 Mar 1982	Accession
Czech Republic		22 Feb 1993	Succession from Czechoslovakia; Signed 28 December 1949; Ratified 21 December 1950
DR Congo		31 May 1962	Succession as (Democratic Republic of the Congo) Republic of the Congo (Léopoldville) from Belgium
Denmark	28 Sep 1949	15 Jun 1951	Ratification
Djibouti		25 Feb 2026	Accession
Dominica		13 May 2019	Accession
Ecuador	11 Dec 1948	21 Dec 1949	Ratification
Egypt	12 Dec 1948	8 Feb 1952	Ratification
El Salvador	27 Apr 1949	28 Sep 1950	Ratification
Estonia		21 Oct 1991	Accession
Ethiopia	11 Dec 1948	1 Jul 1949	Ratification
Fiji		11 Jan 1973	Succession from United Kingdom
Finland		18 Dec 1959	Accession
France	11 Dec 1948	14 Oct 1950	Ratification
Gabon		21 Jan 1983	Accession
Gambia		29 Dec 1978	Accession
Georgia		11 Oct 1993	Accession
Germany		24 Nov 1954	Accession as West Germany; Also East Germany; Acceded 27 March 1973
Ghana		24 Dec 1958	Accession
Greece	29 Dec 1949	8 Dec 1954	Ratification
Guatemala	22 Jun 1949	13 Jan 1950	Ratification
Guinea		7 Sep 2000	Accession
Guinea-Bissau		24 Sep 2013	Accession
Haiti	11 Dec 1948	14 Oct 1950	Ratification
Honduras	22 Apr 1949	5 Mar 1952	Ratification
Hungary		7 Jan 1952	Accession
Iceland	14 May 1949	29 Aug 1949	Ratification
India	29 Nov 1949	27 Aug 1959	Ratification
Iran	8 Dec 1949	14 Aug 1956	Ratification
Iraq		20 Jan 1959	Accession
Ireland		22 Jun 1976	Accession
Israel	17 Aug 1949	9 Mar 1950	Ratification
Italy		4 Jun 1952	Accession
Jamaica		23 Sep 1968	Accession
Jordan		3 Apr 1950	Accession
Kazakhstan		26 Aug 1998	Accession
Kuwait		7 Mar 1995	Accession
Kyrgyzstan		5 Sep 1997	Accession
Laos		8 Dec 1950	Accession
Latvia		14 Apr 1992	Accession
Lebanon	30 Dec 1949	17 Dec 1953	Ratification
Lesotho		29 Nov 1974	Accession
Liberia	11 Dec 1948	9 Jun 1950	Ratification
Libya		16 May 1989	Accession
Liechtenstein		24 Mar 1994	Accession
Lithuania		1 Feb 1996	Accession
Luxembourg		7 Oct 1981	Accession
Malaysia		20 Dec 1994	Accession
Maldives		24 Apr 1984	Accession
Mali		16 Jul 1974	Accession
Malta		6 Jun 2014	Accession
Mauritius		8 Jul 2019	Accession
Mexico	14 Dec 1948	22 Jul 1952	Ratification
Moldova		26 Jan 1993	Accession
Monaco		30 Mar 1950	Accession
Mongolia		5 Jan 1967	Accession
Montenegro	19 Jul 2006	23 Oct 2006	Succession from Serbia and Montenegro
Morocco		24 Jan 1958	Accession
Mozambique		18 Apr 1983	Accession
Myanmar	30 Dec 1949	14 Mar 1956	Ratification
Namibia		28 Nov 1994	Accession
Nepal		17 Jan 1969	Accession
Netherlands		20 Jun 1966	Accession
New Zealand	25 Nov 1949	28 Dec 1978	Ratification
Nicaragua		29 Jan 1952	Accession
Nigeria		27 Jul 2009	Accession
North Korea		31 Jan 1989	Accession
North Macedonia		18 Jan 1994	Succession from Yugoslavia; Signed 11 December 1948; Ratified 29 August 1950
Norway	11 Dec 1948	22 Jul 1949	Ratification
Pakistan	11 Dec 1948	12 Oct 1957	Ratification
Palestine		2 Apr 2014	Accession
Panama	11 Dec 1948	11 Jan 1950	Ratification
Papua New Guinea		27 Jan 1982	Accession
Paraguay	11 Dec 1948	3 Oct 2001	Ratification
Peru	11 Dec 1948	24 Feb 1960	Ratification
Philippines	11 Dec 1948	7 Jul 1950	Ratification
Poland		14 Nov 1950	Accession
Portugal		9 Feb 1999	Accession
Romania		2 Nov 1950	Accession
Russia	16 Dec 1949	3 May 1954	Ratification as Soviet Union
Rwanda		16 Apr 1975	Accession
Saint Vincent and the Grenadines		9 Nov 1981	Accession
San Marino		8 Nov 2013	Accession
Saudi Arabia		13 Jul 1950	Accession
Senegal		4 Aug 1983	Accession
Serbia		12 Mar 2001	Accession as Serbia and Montenegro
Seychelles		5 May 1992	Accession
Singapore		18 Aug 1995	Accession
Slovakia		28 May 1993	Succession from Czechoslovakia; Signed 28 December 1949; Ratified 21 December 1950
Slovenia		6 Jul 1992	Succession from Yugoslavia; Signed 11 December 1948; Ratified 29 August 1950
South Africa		10 Dec 1998	Ratification
South Korea		14 Oct 1950	Accession
Spain		13 Sep 1968	Accession
Sri Lanka		12 Oct 1950	Accession
Sudan		13 Oct 2003	Accession
Sweden	30 Dec 1949	27 May 1952	Ratification
Switzerland		7 Sep 2000	Accession
Syria		25 Jun 1955	Accession
Tajikistan		3 Nov 2015	Accession
Tanzania		5 Apr 1984	Accession
Togo		24 May 1984	Accession
Tonga		16 Feb 1972	Accession
Trinidad and Tobago		13 Dec 2002	Accession
Tunisia		29 Nov 1956	Accession
Turkey		31 Jul 1950	Accession
Uganda		14 Nov 1995	Accession
Ukraine	16 Dec 1949	15 Nov 1954	Ratification as Ukrainian SSR
United Arab Emirates		11 Nov 2005	Accession
United Kingdom		30 Jan 1970	Accession
United States	11 Dec 1948	25 Nov 1988	Ratification
Uruguay	11 Dec 1948	11 Jul 1967	Ratification
Uzbekistan		9 Sep 1999	Accession
Venezuela		12 Jul 1960	Accession
Vietnam		9 Jun 1981	Accession
Yemen		9 Feb 1987	Accession as South Yemen; Also North Yemen; Acceded 6 April 1989
Zambia		20 Apr 2022	Accession
Zimbabwe		13 May 1991	Accession

== Unrecognized state, ratified treaty ==
State	Signed	Deposited	Method
Taiwan	20 Jul 1949	19 Jul 1951	Ratification

== State that has signed but not ratified ==
State	Signed
Dominican Republic	11 Dec 1948

== Municipal laws ==
The Convention on the Prevention and Punishment of the Crime of Genocide (CPPCG) came into effect in January 1951. Article 5, 6 and 7 of the CPPCG cover obligations that sovereign states that are parties to the convention must undertake to enact:

Art. 5: The Contracting Parties undertake to enact, in accordance with their respective Constitutions, the necessary legislation to give effect to the provisions of the present Convention, and, in particular, to provide effective penalties for persons guilty of genocide or any of the other acts enumerated in article III.

Art. 6: Persons charged with genocide or any of the other acts enumerated in article III shall be tried by a competent tribunal of the State in the territory of which the act was committed, or by such international penal tribunal as may have jurisdiction with respect to those Contracting Parties which shall have accepted its jurisdiction.

Art. 7 Genocide and the other acts enumerated in article III shall not be considered as political crimes for the purpose of extradition.
The Contracting Parties pledge themselves in such cases to grant extradition in accordance with their laws and treaties in force.

— CPPCG

Since 1951 the following states have enacted provisions within their municipal law to prosecute or extradite perpetrators of genocide:

State/Jurisdiction	Provisions	Notes
Albania	Chap. 1, Crimes Against Humanity, of the Criminal Code	See Genocide Law (Albania, 1995)
Antigua and Barbuda	Genocide Act, Laws, Vol. 4.	
Argentina		
Armenia	Article 393 of the Criminal code.	
Australia	Division 268 of the Criminal Code	As inserted by the International Criminal Court (Consequential Amendments) Act 2002.
Austria	Paragraph 321 of the Strafgesetzbuch 1974.	Austrian law classifies all acts intended to annihilate a national, ethnic or religious group partially or in its entirety, create circumstances suitable to cause such events, create sterility in the group or other measures intended to prevent wilful procreation, or forcefully abducting children of said group to integrate them into another as genocide, with a statutory sentence of life imprisonment. Conspiracy to commit such acts carries a penalty of one to ten years imprisonment.
Azerbaijan	Article 103 and 104 of the Criminal Code.	
Bahrain	Decree No. 4 of 1990 (on genocide).	
Bangladesh	International Crimes (Tribunals) Act 1973.	
Barbados	Genocide Act, chapter 133A.	
Belarus	Article 127 of the Criminal Code.	
Belgium	Law on serious violations of international humanitarian law, 10 February 1999.	In 1993 Belgium had adopted universal jurisdiction, allowing prosecution of genocide, committed by anybody in the world. The practice was widely applauded by many human rights groups, because it made legal action possible to perpetrators who did not have a direct link with Belgium, and whose victims were not Belgian citizens or residents. Ten years later in 2003, Belgium repealed the law on universal jurisdiction (under pressure from the United States). However, some cases which had already started continued. These included those concerning the Rwandan genocide, and complaints filed against the Chadian ex-President Hissène Habré. In a Belgium court case lodged on 18 June 2001 by 23 survivors of the 1982 Sabra and Shatila massacre, the prosecution alleged that Ariel Sharon, former Israeli defence minister (and Israel's Prime Minister in 2001–2006), as well as other Israelis committed a number of crimes including genocide, because "all the constituent elements of the crime of genocide, as defined in the 1948 Convention and as reproduced in article 6 of the ICC Statute and in article 1§1 of the law of 16 June 1993, are present". This allegation was not tested in Belgium court because on 12 February 2003 the Court of Cassation (Belgian Supreme Court) ruled that under international customary law, acting heads of state and government can not become the object of proceedings before criminal tribunals in foreign state (although for the crime of genocide they could be the subject of proceedings of an international tribunal). This ruling was a reiteration of a decision made a year earlier by the International Court of Justice on 14 February 2002. Following these ruling in June 2003 the Belgian Justice Ministry decided to start a procedure to transfer the case to Israel.
Bolivia	Article 138 of the Código Penal.	
Bosnia and Herzegovina	Article 141 of the Penal Code.	List of Bosnian genocide prosecutions#The Court of Bosnia and Herzegovina
Brazil	Law No. 2.889 of 1 October 1956.	The Helmet Massacre of the Tikuna people took place in 1988, and was initially treated as homicide. Since 1994 it has been treated by the Brazilian courts as a genocide. Thirteen men were convicted of genocide in 2001. In November 2004 at the appeal before Brazil's federal court, the man initially found guilty of hiring men to carry out the genocide was acquitted, and the other men had their initial sentences of 15–25 years reduced to 12 years. In a news letter published on 7 August 2006 the Indianist Missionary Council reported that: "In a plenary session, the [Brazilian] Supreme Federal Court (STF) reaffirmed that the crime known as the Haximu Massacre [perpetrated on the Yanomami Indians in 1993] was a genocide and that the decision of a federal court to sentence miners to 19 years in prison for genocide in connection with other offenses, such as smuggling and illegal mining, is valid. It was a unanimous decision made during the judgement of Extraordinary Appeal (RE) 351487 today, the 3rd, in the morning by justices of the Supreme Court". Commenting on the case the NGO Survival International said "The UN convention on genocide, ratified by Brazil, states that the killing 'with intent to destroy, in whole or in part, a national, ethnical, racial or religious group' is genocide. The Supreme Court's ruling is highly significant and sends an important warning to those who continue to commit crimes against indigenous peoples in Brazil."
Bulgaria	Article 416 on Genocide, of the Criminal Code.	
Burkina Faso	Article 313 of the Code Pénal.	
Burundi		In 2003 the transitional parliament in Burundi passed a law, introduced to parliament by the Burundian Foreign Minister Therence Sinunguruzaa, chiefly aimed at preventing genocide.
Cambodia	Law for prosecuting crimes committed from 1975 to 1979.	
Canada	Act on genocide and war crimes, Article 318 on Advocating Genocide.	In Canada the Crimes Against Humanity and War Crimes Act makes it an offence under Canadian law to commit genocide, whether inside or outside Canada. A person may be charged under this law if, at the time of the crime, the perpetrator was a Canadian citizen or was employed by Canada, if the victim was a Canadian citizen or a citizen of a country allied to Canada, if the perpetrator was a citizen of, or employed by, a country that Canada was engaged in armed conflict with or if, at any time after committing the crime, the perpetrator enters Canadian territory.
Colombia	Articles 101 & 102 of the Código Penal.	
Costa Rica	Article 127 of the Código Penal (14 April 1998).	The law includes political groups or social groups as a protected group.
Côte d'Ivoire	Article 137 of the Code Pénal.	
Croatia	Article 156 of the Penal Code.	
Cuba	Article 361 of the Código Penal.	
Cyprus	Uw 59/ 1980.	
Czech Republic	Article 400 of the Penal Code.	
Denmark	Law Nr. 132 of 29 April 1955.	
El Salvador	Article 361 of the Código Penal.	
Estonia	Article 91 of the Karistusseadustik eriosa.	
Ethiopia	Article 281 of the Penal Code of 1957.	
Fiji	Chapter 3, Part 12, Division 2 of the Crimes Act 2009.	
Finland	Criminal Code	Genocide has been criminalized as a separate crime in Finland since 1995 and carries a penalty from 4 years to life sentence. In addition to actual killing, the description of the crime (joukkotuhonta) covers also cultural assimilation by means of separating children from their original national, ethnic, racial or religious group. Attempted genocide or planning it are punishable. Genocide, as a number of other crimes of international nature is inside Finnish universal jurisdiction, but under Chapter 1, Section 12 of the Criminal Code, incidents of it abroad may not be investigated unless the Prosecutor General gives an order to do this. In 2010 a Rwandan refugee, François Bazaramba was convicted to life in prison for participation in the Rwandan genocide.
France	Article 211-1 of the Code Pénal.	The French law defines "a group determined by any arbitrary criteria" which is far broader than that found in the CPPCG.
Georgia	Article 651 (genocide) of the penal code	
Germany	Article 220a of the Strafgesetzbuch (1954), superseded by article 6 of the Völkerstrafgesetzbuch (2002).	Prior to the 2007 ICJ ruling on the Bosnian Genocide Case German courts handed down several convictions for genocide during the Bosnian War. Novislav Djajić was indicted for participation in genocide, but the Bavarian Higher Regional Court failed to find beyond a reasonable doubt that he had intended to commit genocide. He was found guilty of 14 cases of murder and one case of attempted murder, receiving a sentence of 5 years imprisonment. At Djajic's appeal on 23 May 1997, the Bavarian Appeals Court found that acts of genocide were committed in June 1992, though confined within the administrative district of Foča. The Higher Regional Court (Oberlandesgericht) of Düsseldorf, in September 1997, handed down a genocide conviction against Nikola Jorgić, a Bosnian Serb from the Doboj region who was the leader of a paramilitary group located in the Doboj region. He was sentenced to four terms of life imprisonment for his involvement in genocidal actions that took place in regions of Bosnia and Herzegovina, other than Srebrenica. "On 29 November 1999, the Higher Regional Court (Oberlandesgericht) of Düsseldorf condemned Maksim Sokolović to 9 years in prison for aiding and abetting the crime of genocide and for grave breaches of the Geneva Conventions".
Ghana	Criminal Code (Amendment) Act, 1993 Section 1: Genocide	
Guatemala	Article 376 of the Código Penal	
Hong Kong	Section 9A of the Offences Against Person Ordinance (Cap. 212)	
Hungary	Article 155 of the Penal Code	
Iceland	Genocide Act, 144/2018	
Indonesia	Article 8 - Number 26, 2000 – Genocide	
Iraq	Statute of the Iraqi Special Tribunal, issued 10 December 2003	
Ireland	Section 7 of the International Criminal Court Act 2006.	
Israel	Israeli Law on the Crime of Genocide, 5710-1950	
Italy	law on Genocide of 9 October 1967, n. 962	
Jamaica	Offenses against the person (amendment) 1968, s. 33	
Kiribati (Gilbert Islands)	Penal Code Article 52 (Genocide)	
Kyrgyzstan	Article 373 of the Criminal Code	
Latvia	Article 71 of the Penal Code	
Liechtenstein	Article 321 of the Penal Code	
Lithuania	Article 99 of the Criminal Code	
Luxembourg	Genocide law, 8 August 1985	
Macau	Article 230 of the Penal Code of Macau.	
Mali	Article 30 of the Code Pénal	
Mexico	Article 149 of the Código Penal	
New Zealand	International Crimes and International Criminal Court Act 2000.	
Netherlands	Act Implementing the Conv. on Genocide, 2 July 1964.	Dutch law restricts prosecutions for genocide to its nationals. On December 23, 2005, a Dutch court ruled in a case brought against Frans van Anraat for supplying chemicals to Iraq, that "[it] thinks and considers legally and convincingly proven that the Kurdish population meets the requirement under the genocide conventions as an ethnic group. The court has no other conclusion: that these attacks were committed with the intent to destroy the Kurdish population of Iraq" and because he supplied the chemicals before 16 March 1988, the date of the Halabja poison gas attack, he is guilty of a war crime but not guilty of complicity in genocide.
Nicaragua	Article 549 & 550 of the Código Penal.	
Panama	Article 311 of the Código Penal.	
Paraguay	Articulo 319 9 of the Código Penal.	
Peru	Title XIV (Law # 26926 (Article 129 of the Código Penal)).	The law includes political groups or social groups as a protected group.
Philippines	Section 5 of the Philippine Act on Crimes Against International Humanitarian Law (Republic Act No. 9851)	
Poland	Article 118 of the Kodeks Karny (penal code).	
Portugal	Article 239 of the Codigo Penal.	The law includes political groups or social groups as a protected group.
Republic of the Congo	Law No. 8 - 98 of 31 October 1998 on genocide, war crimes and crimes against humanity.	
Romania	Article 356 of the Penal Code.	
Russia	Article 357 of the Federal Criminal Code.	
Rwanda	Organic Law No. 08/96 on Genocide and Crimes Against Humanity.	
Serbia	Article 370 of the Penal Code 2005.	
Seychelles	Genocide Act of 1969.	
Singapore	Section 130D and 130E of the Penal Code	As inserted by section 28 of the Penal Code (Amendment) Act 2007
Solomon Islands	Article 52 (Genocide) of the Penal Code.	
Slovakia	Articles 259-265 of the Criminal Code.	
Slovenia	Chapter 35, art. 373 and 378 of the Penal Code, 1994.	
South Africa	Implementation of the Rome Statute of the International Criminal Court Act 2002 (Act 27 of 2002).	
Spain	Article 607 of the Código Penal, Ley Orgánica 10/1995, 23 November.	In June 2003 Spanish Judge Baltasar Garzón jailed Ricardo Miguel Cavallo, (also known as Miguel Angel Cavallo), a former Argentine naval officer, extradited from Mexico to Spain pending his trial on charges of genocide and terrorism relating to the years of Argentina's military dictatorship, under a special case of universal jurisdiction. On 29 February 2008, the Spanish agreed to extradite Cavallo to Argentina where he is charged with crimes against humanity. He still faces a trial in Spain on genocide charges at some later date. After a 2005 court ruling, Spanish judges' right to use universal jurisdiction to investigate and try foreigners suspected of genocidal acts committed outside Spain was – temporarily – strengthened. Accordingly, on 7 July 2006, six Guatemalan military officials, among them Efraín Ríos Montt and Oscar Humberto Mejia, were formally charged as part of a case began in 1999 by Nobel peace prize winner Rigoberta Menchú over war crimes they committed during the Guatemalan Civil War (1960–1996) On 11 January 2006 it was also reported that the Spanish High Court would investigate whether seven former Chinese officials, including the former CCP General Secretary Jiang Zemin and former Premier of China Li Peng participated in a genocide in Tibet. The court proceedings in the case brought by the Madrid-based Committee to Support Tibet against several former Chinese officials was opened by the Judge on 6 June 2006, and on the same day China denounced the Spanish court's investigation into claims of genocide in Tibet as an interference in its internal affairs and dismissed the allegations as "sheer fabrication". The case was shelved in 2010, following another law passed in 2009 that restricted High Court investigations to those "involving Spanish victims, suspects who are in Spain, or some other obvious link with Spain". The judicial rules in place in Spain before passed this law had irritated many other countries such as Israel, whose officials had faced possible prosecution.
Suriname	Constitution of Suriname of 1987: Chapter IV: International principles:Article 7.4.	
Sweden	Article 169 of the Lagboken (Act of 20 March 1963).	In Sweden genocide was criminalized in 1964. According to the Swedish law any act intended to destroy, in whole or in part, a national, ethnic, racial or religious group, as such, and which is punished according to the criminal act is punished as genocide and carries a penalty from 4 years to life sentence. The Swedish legislation simply noticed that any severe common crime which is committed in order to destroy an ethnic group can be considered genocide, no matter what specific crime it is. Also intent, preparation or conspiring to genocide, and also failure to reveal such a crime is punishable as specified in penal code chapter 23, which is applicable to all crimes.
Switzerland	Article 264 of the Penal Code.	
Tajikistan	Crimes Against the Peace and Security of Mankind.	
Tonga	Genocide Act, 1969.	
Trinidad and Tobago	Genocide Act, 1977.	
Tuvalu	Article 52 (Genocide) of the Penal Code.	
Ukraine	Article 442 on Genocide, of Criminal Code.	
United Kingdom	The Genocide Act 1969, superseded by the International Criminal Court Act 2001.	The United Kingdom has incorporated the International Criminal Court Act into domestic law. It was not retroactive so it applies only to events after May 2001 and genocide charges can be filed only against British nationals and residents. According to Peter Carter QC, chairman of the Bar's human rights committee "It means that British mercenaries who support regimes that commit war crimes can expect prosecution". The Coroners and Justice Act 2009, altered the ICC ACT so that prosecutions could be taken against anyone in the UK from January 1991 — The date from which the International Criminal Tribunal for the former Yugoslavia had jurisdiction to try offences under the Tribunal's Statute adopted by the United Nations Security Council.
United States	18 U.S.C. §§ 1091–1093	United States federal law recognizes the crime of genocide where it was committed within the U.S. or by a national of the U.S. A person found guilty of genocide can face the death penalty or life imprisonment. Persons found guilty of genocide may be denied entry or deported from the U.S.
Vietnam	Article 422 of the Criminal Code.	

== See also ==
- International Criminal Court
- States parties to the Rome Statute of the International Criminal Court
- List of genocides
