= Property crime =

Criminal acts against private property

Property crime is a category of crime, usually involving private property, that includes, among other crimes, burglary, larceny, theft, motor vehicle theft, arson, shoplifting, and vandalism. Property crime is a crime to obtain money, property, or some other benefit. This may involve force, or the threat of force, in cases like robbery or extortion. Since these crimes are committed in order to enrich the perpetrator they are considered property crimes. Crimes against property are divided into two groups: destroyed property and stolen property. When property is destroyed, it could be called arson or vandalism. Examples of the act of stealing property is robbery or embezzlement.

Property crimes are high-volume crimes, with cash, electronics (e.g. televisions), power tools, cameras, and jewelry often targeted. "Hot products" tend to be items that are concealable, removable, available, valuable, and enjoyable, with an ease of "disposal" being the most important characteristic.

== Types of property crime ==
=== Arson ===
Arson involves any intentional fire setting or attempting to set fire. It is also considered arson if one burns one's own property. A frequent motive for arson is insurance fraud, with the fire staged to appear accidental. Other motives for arson include desire to commit vandalism or mischief, for thrill or excitement, for revenge, to conceal other crimes, or as a hate crime. The Church Arson Prevention Act of 1996 was established to protect places of worship.

=== Burglary ===
Burglary of residences, retail establishments, and other commercial facilities involves breaking and entering, and stealing property. Attempted forcible entry into a property is also classified as burglary, in the FBI's Uniform Crime Reports (UCR) definition.

As of 1999, there were 1.4 million residential burglaries reported in the United States, which was a record low number, not seen since 1966. Though, up to 50% of burglaries are not reported to the police. The clearance rate for burglary is low, with only 12.7% of cases being solved in the United States in 2005, and 23% in the United Kingdom.

In the United States, burglary rates are highest in August and lowest in February, with weather, length-of-day, and other factors having an effect on rates. Fall and Winter are peak seasons for burglary in Denmark. Most residential burglaries occur on weekdays, between 10 and 11 a.m. and 1-3 p.m, when homes are the least likely to be occupied. The temporal pattern is reversed for non-residential burglaries, which are more likely to occur at night and on weekends when commercial premises are unattended.

Burglary at single-family home construction sites is an increasing problem in the United States, Canada, Australia, Europe, and Japan, and elsewhere in the world, with burglary of tools and equipment at residential subdivision construction sites comprising between 5 and 20 percent of building costs. In the United States, equipment worth $300 million to $1 billion is stolen each year. Large-scale tract developers are hardest hit by this form of crime. In 2019 alone, American homes and businesses sustained nearly $13 billion worth of damage or loss from burglaries. Distraction burglary is a form of burglary where the offender(s) trick or dupe the occupant or distract them, allowing co-offender(s) to gain access and commit burglary. The elderly are particularly vulnerable to distraction burglary.

Some crime prevention programs, such as Neighborhood Watch, have shown little effectiveness in reducing burglary and other crime, though can be effective when at least some community participants are home during the weekdays, thus avoiding any large gaps in the Neighborhood Watch during the peak residential property crime hours of 10am to 11am and 1pm to 3pm.

=== Extortion ===
Extortion is the use of threats to obtain the property of another person. Some threats may include: future harm, destroying one's property, injuring one's character or reputation, or death.

=== Theft ===
Theft of cash is most common, over everything else, followed by vehicle parts, clothing, and tools.

In 2005, only 18% of reported cases of larceny/theft were cleared in the United States.

Shoplifting is a specific type of theft, with products taken from retail shops without paying. Items popular with shoplifters include cigarettes, alcoholic beverages, and fashionable clothing.

==== Bicycle theft ====
Bicycle theft is a crime involving theft of a bicycle. Those looking to steal bikes can use a variety of different methods in order to do so.

- Lifting: If the bike is locked to an insecure structure such as a small sign or tree, the thief is able to lift the bike along with its lock off of the structure.
- Cutting: A thief may use a bolt cutter, hack saw, or angle grinder to cut through the bicycle lock.
- Picking: A thief may pick a lock of locks that require a keyhole.

==== Embezzlement ====
Embezzlement is the unlawful taking of property by someone whom it was entrusted to. For example, if a named person trusts their friend enough to allow them to hold their wallet, and the friend goes home without returning the wallet with the intention of keeping the money, the friend would have committed embezzlement.

==== Larceny ====
Larceny is the unlawful taking of another person's property with the intention to deprive the owner of it. If the stolen object is above a large value, then it is considered a felony and is called a grand theft. A petty theft is stealing an object with small value which would pass as a misdemeanor. If a person has a lost item in possession, and a reasonable method exists for finding the owner, they must return it or it would be considered larceny. For example, if one finds a wallet with an ID in it, it is their duty to find a method to return it to the owner. Shoplifting and attempted shoplifting fall under this category.

==== Motor vehicle theft ====
Motor vehicle theft is a common form of property crime, often perpetrated by youths for joyriding. The FBI includes attempted motor vehicle thefts in its Uniform Crime Report (UCR) definition. About 15-20% of motor vehicle thefts are committed for their auto parts or with an intent of re-selling them on the black market. Crime prevention and target-hardening measures, such as car alarms and ignition locks, have been effective deterrents against motor vehicle theft, as have been practices such as etching VINs on car parts.

Only 13% of reported motor vehicle theft cases were cleared in the United States in 2005.

Some car types are more popular with thieves, with sports cars often being preferred by those stealing cars for joyriding. Sport utility vehicles also have higher rates of theft, with the Cadillac Escalade cited in 2003 by the Highway Data Loss Institute as having the most frequent theft claims in the United States.

Construction vehicles are also often stolen, as they can easily be re-sold in the second-hand market.

==== Robbery ====
Robbery is the unlawful taking of property from a person's immediate possession through using force of intimidation.

=== Vandalism ===
Vandalism is the willful destruction or damage to a person's property. There are millions of damage every year. Some examples include: breaking windows, ripping down mailboxes, throwing eggs, graffiti, etc.

==== Mailbox baseball ====
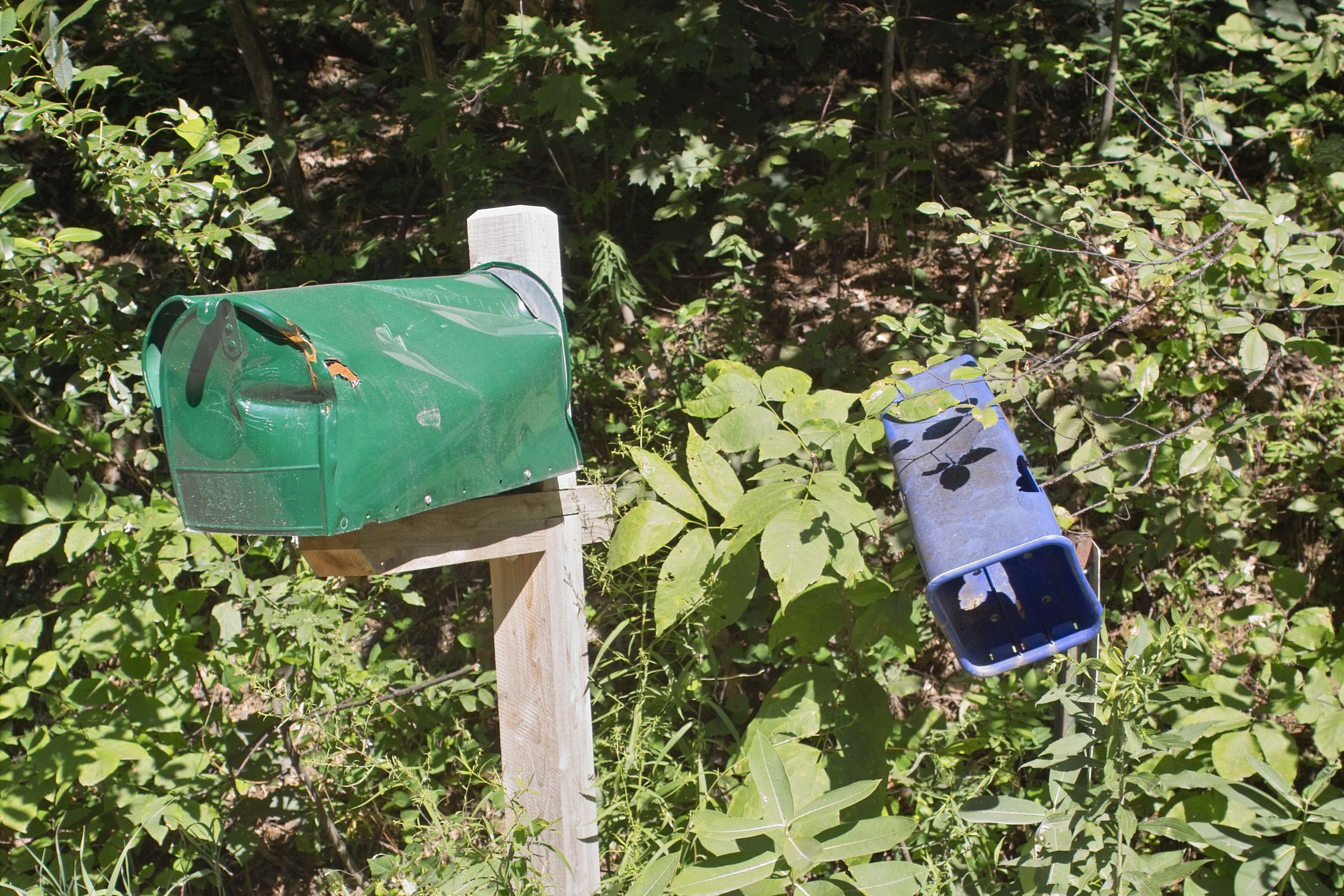
A mailbox (left) that was damaged by a game of mailbox baseball

Mailbox baseball or mailboxing is an activity in which a baseball bat or other object is used to knock over, dent, or smash roadside mailboxes by a passenger in a car. It can be played either as a game, with score kept in a manner similar to baseball, or played simply for aimless fun. In either case it is an act of vandalism and destruction of other peoples' property.

Mailbox baseball is depicted in several films and television shows, such as Stand by Me, The Benchwarmers, Dazed and Confused, Freaks and Geeks, 21 Jump Street, CSI: Crime Scene Investigation (season 9, episode 7; "Woulda, Coulda, Shoulda"), Ghost Whisperer, The Simpsons, Family Guy, and The X-Files.

Damaging, destroying or tampering with mail boxes or with the US mail is a federal crime, punishable by a fine and/or up to three years of imprisonment.

== Law ==
Criminal law is designed to maintain social order and to protect the authority of the state. In capitalist societies, criminal law is also important in protecting personal property and creating a positive environment for economic activity.

In 1473, Carrier's Case in England set a precedent for criminal law in establishing a right for protecting private property. The English court ruled against those who transported merchandise on behalf of others and wrongfully kept that merchandise, stating that it constituted a crime of larceny. The court recognized the importance of protecting property rights, in creating an environment for the English mercantile system to thrive.

In the United States, burglary is considered a felony, and the Federal Bureau of Investigation counts burglary, larceny-theft, motor vehicle theft, and arson in Uniform Crime Reports statistics.

=== Juvenile vandalism penalties ===
==== Restitution ====
To pay for the damages for repair or replacement. The judge may direct the offender to find or maintain employment.

==== Fines ====
Money paid to the court which can range from hundreds to thousands.

==== Probation ====
Must perform specific tasks (school, work, see a counselor etc.).

==== Diversion ====
Similar to probation.

==== Detention ====
This can be full-time, weekends, or enhanced supervision.

== Trends ==
Property crime rates in the United States, 1986-2005 (source: FBI UCR data, which only shows reported crime)

In 2004, 12% of households in the United States experienced some type of property crime, with theft being the most common. The percentage of U.S. households that experienced property crime dropped from 21% in 1994 to 12% in 2004. In Finland, a marked decrease in adolescents committing property crimes also occurred from 1995 to 2004.

The United Kingdom similarly experienced large decreases in property crime, with motor vehicle theft and domestic burglary decreasing 24%, and burglaries, thefts from auto, and other thefts decreasing 45% from 1995 to 2004. From 2001 to 2004, New South Wales in Australia experienced a marked decrease in property crimes, with rates of motor vehicle theft declining by 39%, among other declining trends in property crime.

From 1996 to 2005, the number of arrests in the United States for property crime has declined by 22.1%. The decline is far larger for offenders under age 18, with a decrease of 43.8% in property crime arrests, compared to a 9.5% decrease for those 18 and over. The peak age for property crime arrests in the United States is 16, compared to 18 for violent crime arrests.

== Theory ==
=== Burglary ===
Situational factors or characteristics of the building environment may make it a more tempting target for offenders. Situational factors can be altered by property owners to make a property less desirable as a target of opportunity for potential offenders. According to rational choice theory, criminals weigh costs/risks and benefits in deciding whether or not to take advantage of a crime opportunity.

The permeability of residential neighborhoods, or accessibility to outside traffic, is another factor. The proximity of residential areas to main arterial roads is similarly a factor, as such roads tend to be most familiar to criminals and people in general. Criminals tend not to venture too far from familiar places.

Burglars who take cash and jewelry tend to travel on foot, selecting targets close to a busy city center, whereas burglars that target electronics often will travel by car, tending to favor targets in suburban areas.

== Crime control ==
Property crime control strategies in most English-speaking democracies take a Bentham approach, with focus on punishment and deterrence. Imprisonment punishment also serves to incapacitate offenders for some period of time from re-offending.

== United Kingdom ==
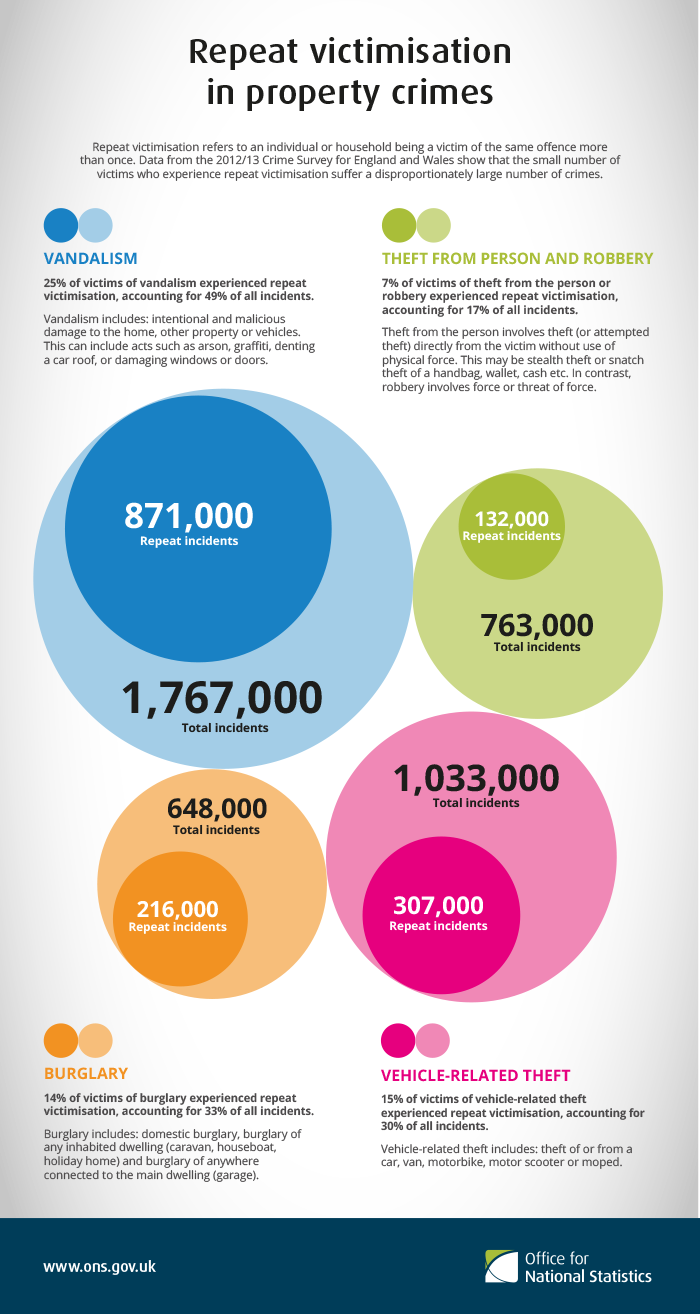
Repeat victimisation by type of property crime offence in the UK (2012–2013)

=== The Visiting Forces Act 1952 ===
The expression "offence against property" is used as a term of art in section 3 of the Visiting Forces Act 1952 (15 & 16 Geo.6 & 1 Eliz.2 c.67) and is defined for that purpose by paragraphs 3 (England and Wales and Northern Ireland) and 4 (Scotland) of the Schedule to that Act

==== England and Wales and Northern Ireland ====
In the application of section 3 of the 1952 Act to England and Wales and to Northern Ireland it means any offence punishable under any of the following enactments:

- the Malicious Damage Act 1861
- section 13 of the Debtors Act 1869 and section 13 of the Debtors Act (Ireland) 1872 (which relate to the obtaining of credit by false pretences and to certain frauds on creditors)
- section 28 of the Road Traffic Act 1930 and section 4 of the Motor Vehicles and Road Traffic Act (Northern Ireland) 1930 (which relate to the taking of a motor vehicle without the owner's consent)
- the Theft Act 1968 except section 8 (robbery)
- the Theft Act (Northern Ireland) 1969 except section 8 (robbery)
- the Theft Act 1978
- the Theft (Northern Ireland) Order 1978
- the Criminal Damage Act 1971
- the Criminal Damage (Northern Ireland) Order 1977
- the Fraud Act 2006
- an offence under section 2 of the Explosive Substances Act 1883 of causing an explosion likely to cause serious injury to property in connection with such an attack as is mentioned in section 1(1)(b) of the Internationally Protected Persons Act 1978
- an offence under section 2 of the Nuclear Material (Offences) Act 1983 where the circumstances are that, either, in the case of a contravention of subsection (2), the act falling within paragraph (a) or (b) of that subsection would, had it been done, have constituted an offence falling within the foregoing sub-paragraphs, or, in the case of a contravention of subsection (3) or (4), the act threatened would, had it been done, have constituted such an offence
- an offence under section 2 of the Explosive Substances Act 1883 of causing an explosion likely to cause serious injury to property in connection with such an attack as is mentioned in section 2(1) of the United Nations Personnel Act 1997

==== Scotland ====
In the application of the section 3 of the 1952 Act to Scotland it means any of the following offences:

- theft, housebreaking with intent to steal, opening lockfast places with intent to steal, reset, plagium, breach of trust and embezzlement, falsehood, fraud and wilful imposition, threats to extort money or with intent to extort money, and malicious mischief
- any offence under section 28 of the Road Traffic Act 1930
- any of the following offences in connection with such an attack as is mentioned in section 1(1)(b) of the Internationally Protected Persons Act 1978:
  - an offence of wilful fireraising
  - an offence under section 2 of the Explosive Substances Act 1883 of causing an explosion likely to cause serious injury to property
- an offence under section 2 of the Nuclear Material (Offences) Act 1983, where the circumstances are that either, in the case of a contravention of subsection (2), the act falling within paragraph (a) or (b) of that subsection would, had it been done, have constituted an offence falling within sub-paragraph (a) or (b) of this paragraph, or, in the case of a contravention of subsection (3) or (4), the act threatened would, had it been done, have constituted such an offence
- any of the following offences in connection with such an attack as is mentioned in section 2(1) of the United Nations Personnel Act 1997
  - an offence of wilful fireraising
  - an offence under section 2 of the Explosive Substances Act 1883 of causing an explosion likely to cause serious injury to property

== See also ==
- Offence against the person
- Property law
- Real property
