= Geneva Conventions and United Nations Personnel (Protocols) Act 2009 =

Act of the Parliament of the United Kingdom

Geneva Conventions and United Nations Personnel (Protocols) Act 2009 (Note: Section 3(5).)
- Act of Parliament
- Parliament of the United Kingdom
- Long title: An Act to amend the Geneva Conventions Act 1957 so as to give effect to the Protocol additional to the Geneva Conventions of 12 August 1949 done on 8 December 2005; and to amend the United Nations Personnel Act 1997 so as to give effect to the Optional Protocol to the Convention on the Safety of United Nations and Associated Personnel adopted by the General Assembly of the United Nations on 8 December 2005.
- Citation: 2009 c. 6
- Introduced by: David Miliband MP, Foreign Secretary (Commons); Lord Malloch-Brown (Lords)
- Territorial extent: United Kingdom

Dates
- Royal assent: 2 July 2009
- Commencement: 2 July 2009 (section 3); 5 April 2010 (section 1 and the Schedule); 28 July 2010 (rest of act); (Note: Section 3(1). Section 4(b) of the Interpretation Act 1978. The Geneva Conventions and United Nations Personnel (Protocols) Act 2009 (Commencement No. 1) Order 2009 (SI 2009/2892). The Geneva Conventions and United Nations Personnel (Protocols) Act 2009 (Commencement No. 2) Order 2010 (SI 2010/1779).)
Other legislation
Amends	Geneva Conventions Act 1957; United Nations Personnel Act 1997

Status: Current legislation

History of passage through Parliament

Text of statute as originally enacted

Text of the Geneva Conventions and United Nations Personnel (Protocols) Act 2009 as in force today (including any amendments) within the United Kingdom, from legislation.gov.uk.

The Geneva Conventions and United Nations Personnel (Protocols) Act 2009 (c. 6) is an act of the Parliament of the United Kingdom relating to the adoption of certain treaties relating to international humanitarian law.

== Provisions ==
It was enacted to give effect to the Third Additional Protocol to the Geneva Conventions and to the Optional Protocol to the Convention on the Safety of United Nations and Associated Personnel.

=== Section 1 ===
This section amends the Geneva Conventions Act 1957 to recognise the red crystal symbol as an emblem of the International Red Cross and Red Crescent Movement.

=== Section 2 ===
This section amends section 4 of the United Nations Personnel Act 1997 to give legal protections to those delivering humanitarian, political or development goals.

=== Section 3 – Commencement, extent and short title ===
- This section came into force on the beginning of 2 July 2009.
- Section 1, relating to the Protocol III to the Geneva Conventions, came into force on 5 April 2010. It was extended, with modifications, to Guernsey, on 15 January 2011.
- Section 2, relating to the Convention on the Safety of United Nations and Associated Personnel, came into force on 28 July 2010.

== See also ==
- Geneva Conventions

== Bibliography ==
- "Geneva Conventions and United Nations Personnel (Protocols) Act 2009". Current Law Statutes Annotated 2009. Sweet & Maxwell. Thomson Reuters. 2010. Volume 1. Chapter 6. pp 6-1 to 6-6.
- Halsbury's Statutes
- Michael Meyer and Charles Garraway, "The Geneva Conventions and United Nations Personnel (Protocols) Act 2009: A Move Away from the Minimalist Approach" (2010) 59 International and Comparative Law Quarterly 171 JSTOR.
