= Obtaining property by deception =

Criminal offence

Obtaining property by deception was formerly a statutory offence in England and Wales and Northern Ireland.

== England and Wales ==
This offence was created by section 15 of the Theft Act 1968. Sections 15(1) and (2) of that Act read:

- (1) A person who by any deception dishonestly obtains property belonging to another, with intent to permanently depriving the other of it shall on conviction on indictment be liable to imprisonment for a term not exceeding ten years.
- (2) For the purposes of this section a person is to be treated as obtaining property if he obtains ownership, possession or control of it and 'obtain' includes obtaining for another or enabling another to obtain or to retain.
- (3) the s6 definition of intention to permanently deprive applies to the s15 offence.

This offence replaced the offence of obtaining by false pretences, contrary to section 32(1) of the Larceny Act 1916.

Section 15 was repealed on 15 January 2007 by Schedule 3 to the Fraud Act 2006.

=== Liability for offences by corporations ===
Section 18 of the Theft Act 1968 applied in relation to section 15.

=== Going equipped for cheat ===
In section 25 of the Theft Act 1968, the word "cheat" meant an offence under section 15.

=== By any deception ===
The deception must be the operative cause of the obtaining of property, and this is a question of fact for the jury to decide, requiring proof that the victim would not have acted in the same way had they known the truth. In R v Laverty although the defendant put new number plates and a new chassis number on a car, the victim bought the car because he thought Laverty was the owner. There was no proof that the false identification plates were the cause of the obtaining. This would suggest that if the victim admits not caring whether the defendant's representation was true or false, an acquittal must follow. But, in Metropolitan Police Commissioner v Charles, a causal link was implied even though the victim admitted not considering the question of whether the bank would or would not honour the cheque. Similarly, in R v Talbott (1995) CLR 396 the defendant gave false details and obtained housing benefit. She was actually entitled to the benefit, but causation was established by the fact that the benefit officer would not have paid her if she had known the defendant was lying. This "constructive" deception is necessitated because many shop assistants and officials may be personally indifferent as to whether the defendant is honest or not. To clarify this aspect of the law, the Law Commission recommend the introduction of a specific offence to cover the use of cheque guarantee and payment cards to remove the need for any implied representation to affect the mind of the particular person accepting the use of the card. This would identify the bank as the true victim.

The deception must precede the obtaining of property. In Director of Public Prosecutions v Ray, the defendant had already obtained the meal before he made the representation. This is an issue of causation so that it can be shown that the deception operated on the mind of the person alleged to be deceived. In R v Coady (1996) CLR 518, the defendant went to two self-service petrol stations. In the first, he served himself and then told the attendant to charge his employer which he was not entitled to do. In the second, he may have made this representation to the attendant before petrol was released to the pump. The convictions were quashed because there was no evidence that the first representation came before the obtaining of the petrol and the judge had failed to direct on the requirement that the deception operate on the mind of the attendant in respect of the second representation. Further, the deception must not be too remote from the obtaining, and/or there must be no break in the chain of causation. In R v Button the defendant falsely represented that he was not a good runner and so obtained a better handicap than he deserved for the race which he won. He was arrested as he attempted to collect the prize but the deception merely gave him the opportunity to run from an advantageous position, whereas the cause of the attempt to collect the prize was that he had won the race.

The deception must operate on a human mind for the causation element to be proved. The fact that a machine may respond to the insertion of a coin, card or token, or that a computer may give a programmed response to data entry does not amount to a section 15 offence, but the defendant can be charged with theft, contrary to section 1, of any property obtained. The Law Commission recommend the creation of a new offence to cover this possibility.

=== Dishonestly ===
The wording of the statute is highly significant because it is by a deception dishonestly and not by a dishonest deception which requires the dishonesty to be proved separately from the deception. Otherwise the dishonesty would be implied by the fact that the deception was made knowingly: see R v Greenstein. However, section 2 of the Theft Act 1968 does not apply to section 15 although the test derived from R v Ghosh [1982] QB 1053 may apply if the defendant claims to believe that he acted in a way matching the ordinary person's idea of honesty, i.e. a defendant will be dishonest where he realised that he was doing something that reasonable and honest people would regard as dishonest. But R v Price held that this test was both unnecessary and potentially misleading in the majority of cases. The Law Commission has debated whether the requirement to prove dishonesty makes obtaining a conviction more difficult, and whether the law should be reformed to make the offences conduct based. The conclusion was that juries are not confused by the need to consider dishonesty as a separate element from deception and that this aspect of the law does not need reform.

=== Obtains ===
In most cases, the defendant will obtain ownership, possession, and control of the property, but the obtaining of any one of these will be sufficient. So, under the Sale of Goods Act, title to goods may pass before possession or control is delivered, or possession may pass before title, or the defendant may obtain control alone, depending on the wording of the contract. Usually, the defendant will be acting in their own right to obtain the goods, but the offence is also committed where the defendant obtains property for another or enables another to obtain or retain. Thus, the offence might be committed where the "victim" is induced to transfer ownership of property to another or to agree not to enforce his right to recover goods from that other. In R v Seward the defendant was acting as the "front man" in the use of stolen credit cards and other documents of identification to obtain goods. This was a role not unlike that of the "mule" in drug importation cases because the front man takes the risk of going into shops where CCTV cameras may clearly identify him. He obtained goods to the value of £10,000 for others who were unlikely ever to be identified. The Court of Appeal considered sentencing policy for deception offences involving "identity theft" – an increasingly common phenomenon. The defendant had a drug problem and it was argued that a drug treatment and testing order might be the more appropriate response, but the court concluded that a prison sentence was required. Henriques J. said at para 14:

Identity fraud is a particularly pernicious and prevalent form of dishonesty calling for, in our judgment, deterrent sentences.

=== Property ===
Section 34(1) of the Theft Act 1968 confirms that the definition given in section 4(1) applies, so property is:

money and all property, real or personal, including things in action and other intangible property.

But the limitations on what can be stolen in sections 4(2) to 4(4) do not apply to section 15. It is therefore possible to obtain land by a deception.

=== Belonging to another ===
For these purposes, section 34(1) applies section 5(1) to the section 15 offence, so:

Property shall be regarded as belonging to any person having possession or control of it, or having in it any proprietary right or interest.

=== Intention to permanently deprive ===
The extended meaning given to "intention permanently to deprive" the other of the property given in section 6 of the Theft Act 1968 applies to section 15.

=== Problem resolved ===
The offence of obtaining a money transfer by deception, contrary to section 15A of the Theft Act 1968, was specifically enacted to remove the problem caused by R v Preddy and Slade, R v Dhillon. This case held that there no section 15 offence was committed when the defendant caused transfers between the victim's and his own bank account by deception. This arises because of the legal relationship between a bank and its customer. The account is a chose in action, i.e. a debt owed by the bank to the customer or vice versa. Thus, when the "transfer" took place, one debt owed by the bank to its client was reduced, and a second debt in the same amount was created, Thus, nothing formerly belonging to the victim was obtained by the defendant.

== Northern Ireland ==
This offence was created by section 15 of the Theft Act (Northern Ireland) 1969. That section was repealed on 15 January 2007 by sections 14 and 15(1) and (4) of, and paragraph 1(c)(i) of Schedule 1 to, and Schedule 3 to, the Fraud Act 2006, subject to the transitional provisions and savings in paragraph 3 of Schedule 2 to that Act.

Visiting forces

This offence was an offence against property for the purposes of section 3 of the Visiting Forces Act 1952.
