= Criminal Justice (Theft and Fraud Offences) Act 2001 =

Criminal act

The Criminal Justice (Theft and Fraud Offences) Act, 2001 (No. 50 of 2001) updates and consolidates the law relating to dishonesty and fraud in Ireland.

The main sections of the statute include:

- Theft and Related Offences
- Making gain or causing loss by deception
- Making off without payment
- Unlawful use of computer
- False accounting
- Suppression of documents
- Burglary
- Robbery
- Possession of certain articles
- Handling Stolen Property and other Proceeds of Crime
- Forgery
- Counterfeiting

== See also ==
- Garda Bureau of Fraud Investigation (GBFI)
- Criminal Justice Act Republic of Ireland
- Deception (criminal law) Republic of Ireland
- Michael Fahy Misappropriation conviction
