= Evasion of liability by deception =

Former statutory offence in parts of the UK

Evasion of liability by deception was formerly a statutory offence in England and Wales and Northern Ireland.

== England and Wales ==
This offence was created by the Theft Act 1978. The law clarified existing law to explicitly make it a crime to, by deception, induce a creditor to remit a liability (i.e., a debt) in whole or part; induce the creditor to wait for payment or to forgo payment; or where the deception exempts a person from a liability or reduces the liability which would have arisen but for the deception. Under section 16 of the Theft Act 1968, it was more ambiguous under what circumstances such deception comprised a crime.

== Northern Ireland ==
This offence was created by article 4 of the Theft (Northern Ireland) Order 1978 (S.I. 1978/1407 (N.I. 23)). That article was repealed on 15 January 2007 by sections 14(1) and (3) and 15(1) of, and paragraph 1(d)(ii) of Schedule 1 to, and Schedule 3 to, the Fraud Act 2006, subject to transitional provisions and savings in paragraph 3 of Schedule 2 to that Act.

Mode of trial

See article 6(1).

Sentence

A person guilty of this offence was liable, on conviction on indictment, to imprisonment for a term not exceeding five years, or, on summary conviction, to imprisonment for a term not exceeding six months, or to a fine not exceeding £1000, or to both.

== See also ==
- Deception (criminal law)
