= Nuclear Explosions (Prohibition and Inspections) Act 1998 =

Act of the Parliament of the United Kingdom

Nuclear Explosions (Prohibition and Inspections) Act 1998 (Note: Section 16(4).)
- Act of Parliament
- Parliament of the United Kingdom
- Long title: An Act to enable effect to be given to certain provisions of the Comprehensive Nuclear-Test-Ban Treaty adopted in New York on 10th September 1996 and the Protocol to that Treaty; and for connected purposes.
- Citation: 1998 c. 7
- Territorial extent: United Kingdom (Note: Section 16(2)–(3).)

Dates
- Royal assent: 18 March 1998
- Commencement: Not in force (Note: Section 16(1).)
Other legislation
Amends	Army Act 1955; Air Force Act 1955; Naval Discipline Act 1957

Status: Not yet in force

Text of statute as originally enacted

Revised text of statute as amended

The Nuclear Explosions (Prohibition and Inspections) Act 1998 (c. 7) is an act of the Parliament of the United Kingdom.

The act was passed to implement and enforce the Comprehensive Test Ban Treaty of 1996. It is not yet in force.

== Provisions ==
The act explicitly declares that to knowingly cause a nuclear explosion, for a test or any other reason, will be an offence, and punishable by life imprisonment and confiscation of anything relating to the offence. The only exception is where the explosion is deemed to have been carried out in the course of an armed conflict – if a question arises over this then the Secretary of State for Defence decides and issues a certificate of his determination. The act will apply to any explosion caused within the United Kingdom, or caused elsewhere by British nationals or corporations.

The act will also allow for on-site inspection parties as mandated by the treaty, and criminalise any attempts to wilfully obstruct such inspections. It will also grant powers to enter and search premises if a justice of the peace is satisfied that there is reasonable ground for suspecting that an offence is being, has been, or is about to be committed.

The final section of the act states that the act does not come into effect until a minister signs an order declaring the date on which it is to become effective. This has not yet been done. However the Anti-terrorism, Crime and Security Act 2001, which is in force, includes offences relating to nuclear weapons.

== See also ==
- Nuclear Material (Offences) Act 1983
