= Geneva Conventions Act 1957 =

Act of the Parliament of the United Kingdom

Geneva Conventions Act 1957 (Note: Section 8(1).)
- Act of Parliament
- Parliament of the United Kingdom
- Long title: An Act to enable effect to be given to certain international conventions done at Geneva on the twelfth day of August, nineteen hundred and forty-nine, and for purposes connected therewith.
- Citation: 5 & 6 Eliz. 2. c. 52
- Territorial extent: United Kingdom; Channel Islands; Isle of Man; any colony; (Note: Section 8(2).)

Dates
- Royal assent: 31 July 1957
- Commencement: 31 July 1957 (Note: The Acts of Parliament (Commencement) Act 1793.)
Other legislation
Amended by	Criminal Law Act 1967; Courts-Martial (Appeals) Act 1968; Courts Act 1971; Geneva Conventions (Amendment) Act 1995; International Criminal Court Act 2001; Geneva Conventions and United Nations Personnel (Protocols) Act 2009

Status: Amended

Records of Parliamentary debate relating to the statute from Hansard

Text of statute as originally enacted

Revised text of statute as amended

Text of the Geneva Conventions Act 1957 as in force today (including any amendments) within the United Kingdom, from legislation.gov.uk.

The Geneva Conventions Act 1957 (5 & 6 Eliz. 2. c. 52) is an act of the Parliament of the United Kingdom that incorporates the provisions of the Geneva Conventions into British law.

One aspect of the act is that it makes wearing the Red Cross symbol illegal in many circumstances, sometimes with curious consequences. In 2011, a British pantomime costume had to be changed in order to comply with the Geneva Conventions Act.

Its provisions were later amended by the Geneva Conventions (Amendment) Act 1995 and Geneva Conventions and United Nations Personnel (Protocols) Act 2009.

== See also ==
- Geneva Conventions (Amendment) Act 1995
- Geneva Conventions and United Nations Personnel (Protocols) Act 2009
