= Geneva Conventions (Amendment) Act 1995 =

Act of the Parliament of the United Kingdom

Geneva Conventions (Amendment) Act 1995 (Note: Section 7(1).)
- Act of Parliament
- Parliament of the United Kingdom
- Long title: An Act to make provision for the amendment of the Geneva Conventions Act 1957 to enable effect to be given to the Protocols additional to the Geneva Conventions of 1949 done at Geneva on 10 June 1977; and for connected purposes
- Citation: 1995 c. 27
- Territorial extent: United Kingdom; Channel Islands; Isle of Man; (Note: Section 7(3)–(4).)

Dates
- Royal assent: 19 July 1995
- Commencement: 20 July 1998 (Note: Section 7(2). The Geneva Conventions (Amendment) Act 1995 (Commencement) Order 1998 (SI 1998/1505).)
Other legislation
Amends	Geneva Conventions Act 1957
Amended by	International Criminal Court Act 2001

Status: Amended

Records of Parliamentary debate relating to the statute from Hansard

Text of statute as originally enacted

Text of the Geneva Conventions (Amendment) Act 1995 as in force today (including any amendments) within the United Kingdom, from legislation.gov.uk.

The Geneva Conventions (Amendment) Act 1995 (c. 27) is an act of the Parliament of the United Kingdom.

== Provisions ==
The act made provision for the amendment of the United Kingdom's Geneva Conventions Act 1957 (5 & 6 Eliz. 2. c. 52) to enable the addition of Protocol I and Protocol II to the Geneva Conventions of 1949, to be incorporated into the law of England (and Wales), Scotland, Northern Ireland, the Channel Islands, the Isle of Man, and British colonies.

The act awards the domestic courts of the United Kingdom universal jurisdiction for humanitarian law.
