= Convention on the Safety of United Nations and Associated Personnel =

1994 UN treaty

- Type: privileges and immunities; international criminal law
- Drafted: 9 December 1994
- Signed: 15 December 1994
- Location: New York City, United States
- Effective: 15 January 1999
- Condition: 22 ratifications
- Signatories: 43
- Parties: 94
- Depositary: United Nations Secretary-General
- Languages: Arabic, Chinese, English, French, Russian, and Spanish

The Convention on the Safety of United Nations and Associated Personnel is a United Nations treaty that has the goal of protecting United Nations peacekeepers and other UN personnel.

== Adoption ==
New Zealand and Ukraine proposed such a convention in 1993, and the International Law Commission drafted the convention in 1994. The United Nations General Assembly passed a resolution adopting the convention on 9 December 1994.

== Content ==
Parties to the convention agree to criminalise the commission of murders or kidnappings of UN or association personnel as well as violent attacks against the equipment, official premises, private accommodation, or means of transport of such persons. Parties to the convention also agree to criminalise the attempted commission or threatened commission of such acts. "UN personnel" refers to individuals engaged or deployed by the UN Secretary-General as members of the military, police, or civilian components of a UN operation; it also includes officials of the UN specialized agencies and the International Atomic Energy Agency. "Associated personnel" includes other personnel—such as members of non-governmental organizations—assigned to act in an official capacity by UN personnel.

A central provision of the convention is the principle of aut dedere aut judicare—that a party to the treaty must either (1) prosecute a person who commits an offence against UN or associated personnel or (2) send the person to another state that requests his or her extradition for prosecution of the same crime.

The convention states that the military and police components of a UN operation—including vehicles, aircraft, and vessels—shall bear distinctive UN identification and that all UN and associated personnel shall carry appropriate identification. The treaty also states that the UN and associated personnel shall respect and abide by the domestic laws of the host state.

== Ratifications and parties ==
By the end of 1995, the convention had been signed by 43 states and it came into force on 15 January 1999 after it had been ratified by 22 states. As of June 2016, the treaty has been ratified by 93 states, which includes 92 UN member states plus the State of Palestine. The states that signed the convention but have not yet ratified it are Haiti, Honduras, Malta, Pakistan, Sierra Leone, and the United States.

== Optional Protocol ==
On 8 December 2005, the Optional Protocol to the Convention on the Safety of United Nations and Associated Personnel was adopted by the UN General Assembly. The Optional Protocol simply expands the scope of what constitutes a "UN operation" to include "delivering humanitarian, political or development assistance in peacebuilding" and "delivering emergency humanitarian assistance". The Optional Protocol was signed by 34 states, came into force on 19 August 2010, and as of June 2016 has been ratified by 30 states.

== See also ==
- Geneva Conventions and United Nations Personnel (Protocols) Act 2009
