= Extradition Act 1989 =

Act of the Parliament of the United Kingdom

Extradition Act 1989 (Note: Section 38(1).)
- Act of Parliament
- Parliament of the United Kingdom
- Long title: An Act to consolidate enactments relating to extradition under the Criminal Justice Act 1988, the Fugitive Offenders Act 1967 and the Extradition Acts 1870 to 1935, with amendments to give effect to recommendations of the Law Commission and the Scottish Law Commission.
- Citation: 1989 c. 33
- Territorial extent: United Kingdom (Note: Section 38(5).)

Dates
- Royal assent: 27 July 1989
- Commencement: 27 July 1989 (certain sections) (Note: Section 38(3).); 27 September 1989 (remainder) (Note: Section 38(2).)
- Repealed: 1 January 2004 (Note: The Extradition Act 2003 (Commencement and Savings) Order 2003 (SI 2003/3103).)

Other legislation
- Amends: See § Repealed enactments
- Repeals/revokes: See § Repealed enactments
- Amended by: Drug Trafficking Act 1994; International Criminal Court Act 2001
- Repealed by: Extradition Act 2003

Status: Repealed

Text of statute as originally enacted

Revised text of statute as amended

The Extradition Act 1989 (c. 33) was an act of the Parliament of the United Kingdom that consolidated enactments relating to extradition in the United Kingdom.

== Provisions ==
=== Repealed enactments ===
Section 37(1) of the act repealed 29 enactments, listed in schedule 2 to the act.

Citation	Short title	Extent of repeal
33 & 34 Vict. c. 52	Extradition Act 1870	The whole act.
36 & 37 Vict. c. 60	Extradition Act 1873	In section 1, the words from the beginning to "and", in the fourth place where it occurs and the word "alone".
36 & 37 Vict. c. 60	Extradition Act 1873	Sections 3 and 4.
36 & 37 Vict. c. 60	Extradition Act 1873	Sections 6 to 8.
36 & 37 Vict. c. 60	Extradition Act 1873	The Schedule.
36 & 37 Vict. c. 88	Slave Trade Act 1873	Section 27.
58 & 59 Vict. c. 33	Extradition Act 1895	The whole act.
6 Edw. 7. c. 15	Extradition Act 1906	The whole act.
22 & 23 Geo. 5. c. 39	Extradition Act 1932	The whole act.
25 & 26 Geo. 5. c. 25	Counterfeit Currency (Convention) Act 1935	Section 6(4).
4 & 5 Eliz. 2. c. 69	Sexual Offences Act 1956	In Schedule 3, the entry relating to the Extradition Act 1873.
9 & 10 Eliz. 2. c. 60	Suicide Act 1961	In Schedule 1, in Part II, the entry relating to the Extradition Act 1870.
1967 c. 58	Criminal Law Act 1967	Section 4(6).
1967 c. 58	Criminal Law Act 1967	Section 11(2)(a)(i).
1967 c. 68	Fugitive Offenders Act 1967	The whole act.
1968 c. 60	Theft Act 1968	In Part II of Schedule 2, the entry relating to the Extradition Act 1873.
1969 c. 12	Genocide Act 1969	In section 2, subsection (1), and in subsection (2), the words "the Acts mentioned in subsection (1) of this section, the Extradition Act 1873 and".
1969 c. 54	Children and Young Persons Act 1969	Section 60.
1971 c. 38	Misuse of Drugs Act 1971	Section 33.
1971 c. 48	Criminal Damage Act 1971	Section 11(4).
1973 c. 62	Powers of Criminal Courts Act 1973	In Schedule 5, paragraph 15.
1978 c. 17	Internationally Protected Persons Act 1978	Section 3.
1978 c. 17	Internationally Protected Persons Act 1978	Section 4(1).
1978 c. 26	Suppression of Terrorism Act 1978	Section 1(3)(a) and (b).
1978 c. 26	Suppression of Terrorism Act 1978	Section 2(1).
1978 c. 26	Suppression of Terrorism Act 1978	Section 3.
1978 c. 31	Theft Act 1978	Section 5(3).
1978 c. 37	Protection of Children Act 1978	Section 1(6).
1981 c. 61	British Nationality Act 1981	In Schedule 7, the entry relating to the Fugitive Offenders Act 1967.
1982 c. 16	Civil Aviation Act 1982	Section 93.
1982 c. 28	Taking of Hostages Act 1982	Section 3(1) and (4).
1982 c. 28	Taking of Hostages Act 1982	Section 4.
1982 c. 28	Taking of Hostages Act 1982	Section 5(1).
1982 c. 36	Aviation Security Act 1982	Section 9.
1982 c. 36	Aviation Security Act 1982	Section 39(1).
1983 c. 18	Nuclear Material (Offences) Act 1983	Section 5.
1983 c. 18	Nuclear Material (Offences) Act 1983	Section 7(1).
1985 c. 38	Prohibition of Female Circumcision Act 1985	Section 3(1).
1988 c. 33	Criminal Justice Act 1988	Sections 1 to 21.
1988 c. 33	Criminal Justice Act 1988	Sections 136 and 137.
1988 c. 33	Criminal Justice Act 1988	Section 138(2) and (3).
1988 c. 33	Criminal Justice Act 1988	Schedule 1.
1988 c. 33	Criminal Justice Act 1988	In Schedule 15, paragraphs 34, 54, 55, 57, 81, 83 to 88 and 95 and 96.
1989 c. 4	Prevention of Terrorism (Temporary Provisions) Act 1989	In Schedule 8, paragraph 1.

== Subsequent developments ==
The whole act was repealed by section 220 of, and schedule 4 to, the Extradition Act 2003, which came into force on 1 January 2004. (Note: The Extradition Act 2003 (Commencement and Savings) Order 2003 (SI 2003/3103).)
