= Nuclear Material (Offences) Act 1983 =

Act of the Parliament of the United Kingdom

Nuclear Material (Offences) Act 1983 (Note: Section 8(1).)
- Act of Parliament
- Parliament of the United Kingdom
- Long title: An Act to implement the Convention on the Physical Protection of Nuclear Material; and for purposes connected therewith.
- Citation: 1983 c. 18
- Territorial extent: United Kingdom; Isle of Man (Note: The Nuclear Material (Offences) Act 1983 (Isle of Man) Order 2009 (SI 2009/3203).); extraterritorial jurisdiction; (Note: Section 7.)

Dates
- Royal assent: 9 May 1983
- Commencement: 2 October 1991 (Note: Section 8(2). The Nuclear Material (Offences) Act 1983 (Commencement) Order 1991 (SI 1991/1716).)

Other legislation
- Amends: Theft Act 1968
- Amended by: Extradition Act 1989; Justice (Northern Ireland) Act 2002; Crime (International Co-operation) Act 2003; Terrorism Act 2006; Fraud Act 2006; Criminal Justice and Immigration Act 2008; Statute Law (Repeals) Act 2008; Nuclear Material (Offences) Act 1983 (Isle of Man) Order 2009

Status: Amended

Text of statute as originally enacted

Revised text of statute as amended

Text of the Nuclear Material (Offences) Act 1983 as in force today (including any amendments) within the United Kingdom, from legislation.gov.uk.

The Nuclear Material (Offences) Act 1983 (c. 18) is an act of the Parliament of the United Kingdom. It implemented the 1980 Convention on the Physical Protection of Nuclear Material, and to that end it granted the UK courts extraterritorial jurisdiction over offences involving "nuclear material used for peaceful purposes." (Offences involving nuclear weapons are dealt with under the Anti-terrorism, Crime and Security Act 2001.)

The act has been extensively amended by the Criminal Justice and Immigration Act 2008 (Schedule 17), which came into force on 30 November 2009. The 2008 Act implemented amendments which were made to the Convention in 2005.

== Provisions ==
According to section 6(1) of the act, the act only applies to "material which, within the meaning of the Convention, is nuclear material used for peaceful purposes." Schedule 1 to the Act reproduces Article 1 of the Convention, which defines "nuclear material" in detail. The definition includes certain types of plutonium and uranium (but not thorium).

=== Sections 1 and 1A ===
Article 7 of the convention requires state parties to create criminal offences prohibiting the use or possession of nuclear material in a way that might cause death or injury, or "substantial damage to property," or to steal nuclear material. Section 1 of the act implements article 7 by giving the courts of England and Wales, Scotland, or Northern Ireland the jurisdiction to try certain offences (such as murder and robbery) even if they were committed outside the United Kingdom by people of other nationalities, provided that the offence was committed "in relation to or by means of nuclear material". If any person is prosecuted for such an offence before a court in any part of the UK, they may be tried and punished for that offence as if they had committed it there.

Section 1 was amended by the Criminal Justice and Immigration Act 2008 to extend the courts' jurisdiction to try certain offences if they were committed by doing an act directed at a nuclear facility which causes death, injury or damage as a result of radiation or the release of radioactive material, even if done out of the UK and irrespective of the nationality of the person doing it. (Note that the damage does not have to be "substantial.")

The 2008 act also increased the maximum penalties for some of the offences mentioned in section 1, if they were committed in certain circumstances set out in a new section 1A, to life imprisonment.

=== Section 1B ===
Section 1B, inserted by the 2008 act, makes it an offence for a person of any nationality, and whether in the UK or not, to receive, hold or deal with nuclear material, or do an act directed at a nuclear facility, intending to damage the environment or being reckless as to whether the environment will be damaged. The offence is punishable with life imprisonment.

=== Section 1C ===
This section, inserted by the 2008 act, makes it an offence to be "knowingly concerned in" the importation or exportation of nuclear material from one country or territory to another, if done in prohibition of the law of that country or territory. The maximum sentence is 14 years.

=== Section 2 ===
Article 7 of the convention also required that it should be an offence to threaten to use nuclear material to cause death, injury or substantial damage, or threaten to steal it. Section 2 implemented this part of Article 7 by creating three new offences. However the whole of section 2 was replaced with a new version of section 2, which was substituted by the 2008 Act. The new section 2 creates four offences, which may be committed in the UK or elsewhere and by a person of any nationality:

1. receiving, holding or dealing with nuclear material for the purpose of causing death, injury or damage;
2. interfering with a nuclear facility, intending to cause death, injury or damage or being reckless as to whether that would occur;
3. threatening to cause (by either of the means described above) death, injury, damage to property or damage to the environment, intending that the recipient of the threat will fear that it will be carried out;
4. threatening to steal nuclear material in order to influence a state, international governmental organisation or person.

These offences are punishable by life imprisonment.

=== Section 2A ===
This section, inserted by the 2008 act, extends the jurisdiction of the UK courts to offences of attempting or conspiring to commit an offence covered by section 1 of the Act, or created by sections 1B to 2 of the act, or inciting such an offence.

=== Section 3 ===
Section 3 requires that an offence which would not already be an offence but for the Act may not be prosecuted in England and Wales without the permission of the Attorney General for England and Wales, and may not be prosecuted in Northern Ireland without the permission of the Attorney General for Northern Ireland.

=== Section 3A ===
Section 3A, inserted by the 2008 act, states that the 1983 act does not apply to anything done by the armed forces of any country.

=== Sections 4, 5 and 6 ===
Section 4 made minor amendments to other legislation. Section 5 was to have implemented Article 11 of the Convention, which required State Parties to make the offences described in Article 7 extraditable offences. However, before the 1983 Act came into force in 1991, section 5 was replaced by the Extradition Act 1989.

Section 6 deals with the interpretation of certain provisions of the Act, and allows the Secretary of State to determine whether any nuclear material or nuclear facility was being used for peaceful purposes. His determination is binding on the courts.

=== Sections 7 and 8 ===
Section 7 authorises the Queen (by Order in Council) to extend the act to the Channel Islands, the Isle of Man and any British overseas territory. Section 8 gave the act its short title, and provided that the act was to come into force on a date to be appointed by Order in Council. The date appointed was 2 October 1991.

== See also ==
- Nuclear Explosions (Prohibition and Inspections) Act 1998
