= Making off without payment =

Statutory (criminal) offence

Making off without payment is a statutory offence in England and Wales, Northern Ireland, Republic of Ireland and Hong Kong. It was first introduced on the recommendation of the Criminal Law Revision Committee and is intended to protect legitimate business concerns and applies where goods are supplied or a service is performed on the basis that payment will be made there and then. A taxi passenger who runs off without paying the fare at the end of the journey; and a motorist who fills up with petrol at a garage and drives off when the attendant is distracted. For these purposes, it must be proved that the defendant knew that payment on the spot was required or expected, and made off dishonestly with intent to avoid payment of the amount due.

Prior to the creation of the offence, running off might be a tort but it was not a crime; the supplier would have to bring a civil lawsuit against the recipient. The use of criminal law is intended to avoid this expense. To be a theft, the goods must belong to another when the appropriation occurs. A Sale of Goods Act (in the United Kingdom, the Consumer Rights Act 2015) determines when the ownership of goods passes. If the goods are being ascertained as part of the contract, title will pass when the goods are identified or measured. In a garage, it will occur when the fuel is measured as it passes through the pump into the car's tank. Similarly, if ownership passed before an intention to avoid payment was formed, no crime was committed. This became too common an event and so the law had to be clarified to enable convictions to be obtained despite civil law niceties.

== England and Wales ==
In England and Wales, this offence is created by section 3 of the Theft Act 1978, which provides:

- (1) Subject to subsection (3) below, a person who, knowing that payment on the spot for any goods supplied or service done is required or expected from him, dishonestly makes off without having paid as required or expected and with intent to avoid payment of the amount due shall be guilty of an offence.
- (2) For purposes of this section 'payment on the spot' includes payment at the time of collecting goods on which work has been done, or in respect of which service has been provided.
- (3) Subsection (1) above shall not apply where the supply of the goods or the doing of the service is contrary to law, or where the service done is such that payment is not legally enforceable.

In R v Allen, the House of Lords said that, in order for the offence to be committed, there must be "an intention to permanently deprive" by making off, and that a mere "intention to defer" payment is not sufficient. In theory, a person could eat a meal at a restaurant, not pay, but leave his name and address in order for the restaurant to start civil recovery procedures against him; as long as the details were correct, and he did intend to pay at some point in the future (by way of civil recovery), then no offence under Section 3 would be committed.

== Northern Ireland ==
This offence is created by article 5 of the Theft (Northern Ireland) Order 1978 (S.I. 1978/1407 (N.I. 23)).

Article 5(4) was repealed on 1 March 2007 by articles 1(2) and 15(4) and 41(2) of, and paragraph 17 of Schedule 1 to, and Schedule 2 to, the Police and Criminal Evidence (Amendment) (Northern Ireland) Order 2007 (S.I. 2007/288 (N.I. 2)).

=== Sentence ===
A person guilty of this offence is liable on conviction on indictment to imprisonment for a term not exceeding two years, or, on summary conviction, to imprisonment for a term not exceeding six months, or to a fine not exceeding £1000, or to both.

== Republic of Ireland ==
This offence is created by section 8 of the Criminal Justice (Theft and Fraud Offences) Act, 2001, as recommended in 1992 by the Law Reform Commission.

== Hong Kong ==
The offence of "making off without payment" (不付款而離去) is created by section 18C of the Theft Ordinance (Cap. 210) [cf. 1978 c. 31 s. 3 U.K.].

=== Sentence ===
A person guilty of this offence is liable on conviction on indictment to imprisonment for 3 years.

== See also ==
- 86
- Dine and dash
- Fraud Act 2006
- Shrinkage
- Theft of services
- Victimology

== Sources ==
- Criminal Law Revision Committee (CLRC). 13th Report. Section 16 of the Theft Act 1968 (Cmnd. 6733) (1977)
- Law Reform Commission (28 September 1992). "27: Making off without payment". Report on the Law relating to Dishonesty. LRC reports. Vol. 43. Dublin. pp. 226–232.
