= Obtaining a money transfer by deception =

Obtaining a money transfer by deception is a former statutory offence in England and Wales and Northern Ireland.

== England and Wales ==
The offence was created by section 15A of the Theft Act 1968. Section 15B made supplementary provision. Both of those sections were inserted by section 1(1) of the Theft (Amendment) Act 1996.

Section 15A was repealed on 15 January 2007 by sections 14(1) and (3) and 15(1) of, and paragraph 1(a)(ii) of Schedule 1 to, and Schedule 3 to, the Fraud Act 2006, subject to transitional provisions and savings in paragraph 3 of Schedule 2 to that Act.

Section 15B was repealed on the same date by sections 14(1) and (3) and 15(1) of, and paragraph 3 of Schedule 1 to, and Schedule 3 to, the Fraud Act 2006.

The purpose of this offence was to fill the lacuna in the law identified by the decision in R v Preddy and Slade, R v Dhillon. It implemented recommendations of the Law Commission.

== Northern Ireland ==
The offence was created by section 15A of the Theft Act (Northern Ireland) 1969. Section 15B made supplementary provision. Both of those sections were inserted by article 3(1) of the Theft (Amendment) (Northern Ireland) Order 1997 (S.I. 1997/277 (N.I. 3)).

Section 15A was repealed on 15 January 2007 by sections 14 and 15(1) and (4) of, and paragraph 1(c)(ii) of Schedule 1 to, and Schedule 3 to, the Fraud Act 2006, subject to transitional provisions and savings in paragraph 3 of Schedule 2 to that Act.

Section 15B was repealed on the same date by sections 14(1) and (3) and 15(1) and (4) of, and paragraph 9 of Schedule 1 to, and Schedule 3 to, the Fraud Act 2006.
