= International Criminal Court Act 2001 =

Act of the Parliament of the United Kingdom

International Criminal Court Act 2001 (Note: Section 84.)
- Act of Parliament
- Parliament of the United Kingdom
- Long title: An Act to give effect to the Statute of the International Criminal Court; to provide for offences under the law of England and Wales and Northern Ireland corresponding to offences within the jurisdiction of that Court; and for connected purposes.
- Citation: 2001 c. 17
- Territorial extent: England and Wales; Northern Ireland; (Note: Section 79.)

Dates
- Royal assent: 11 May 2001
- Commencement: 1 September 2001 (Note: Section 82. The International Criminal Court Act 2001 (Commencement) Order 2001 as amended by the International Criminal Court Act 2001 (Commencement) (Amendment) Order 2001.)
Other legislation
Amends	Army Act 1955; Air Force Act 1955; Geneva Conventions Act 1957; Naval Discipline Act 1957; Backing of Warrants (Republic of Ireland) Act 1965; Immigration Act 1988; Extradition Act 1989; Sexual Offences (Amendment) Act 1992; Geneva Conventions (Amendment) Act 1995; Access to Justice Act 1999
Repeals/revokes	Genocide Act 1969
Amended by	Life Sentences (Northern Ireland Consequential Amendments) Order 2001; Land Registration Act 2002; Courts Act 2003; Extradition Act 2003; Criminal Justice Act 2003; Nationality, Immigration and Asylum Act 2002 (Consequential and Incidental Provisions) Order 2003; Constitutional Reform Act 2005; Serious Organised Crime and Police Act 2005; International Organisations Act 2005; Armed Forces Act 2006; International Tribunals (Sierra Leone) Act 2007; Serious Crime Act 2007; Police and Criminal Evidence (Amendment) (Northern Ireland) Order 2007; Criminal Justice and Immigration Act 2008; Criminal Justice (Northern Ireland Consequential Amendments) Order 2008; Coroners and Justice Act 2009; Bribery Act 2010; Legal Aid, Sentencing and Punishment of Offenders Act 2012; Enterprise and Regulatory Reform Act 2013 (Consequential Amendments) (Bankruptcy) and the Small Business, Enterprise and Employment Act 2015 (Consequential Amendments) Regulations 2016; Sentencing Act 2020; Police, Crime, Sentencing and Courts Act 2022; Offenders (Day of Release from Detention) Act 2023
Relates to	International Criminal Court (Scotland) Act 2001; Criminal Justice and Police Act 2001

Status: Amended

Text of statute as originally enacted

Revised text of statute as amended

The International Criminal Court Act 2001 (c. 17) is an act of the Parliament of the United Kingdom. The Act incorporates into English law and Northern Ireland law the Rome Statute of the International Criminal Court.

The principal aims of the Act are:

- to incorporate into domestic law the offences contained in the Rome Statute (genocide, war crimes and crimes against humanity);
- to fulfill the United Kingdom's obligations under the Statute, particularly in relation to the arrest and surrender of persons wanted by the International Criminal Court (ICC) and the provision of assistance with respect to ICC investigations; and
- to create a legal framework so that persons convicted by the ICC can serve prison sentences in the United Kingdom.

In 2006, three British military personnel were charged with inhumane treatment, a war crime, under the Act. Two of the three soldiers were cleared but the third, Corporal Donald Payne, became the first British person to be convicted of a war crime under this Act, when he admitted to inhumanly treating Baha Mousa. The first prosecution for crimes against humanity under the Act occurred in 2026 when a former member of the Syrian Air Force Intelligence Directorate was charged with murder and conduct ancillary to murder.

The corresponding Act of the Scottish Parliament is the International Criminal Court (Scotland) Act 2001 (asp 13).

Commencement Orders
The International Criminal Court Act 2001 (Commencement) Order 2001 (S.I. 2001/2161) (C.69) HTML PDF
The International Criminal Court Act 2001 (Commencement) (Amendment) Order 2001] (S.I. 2001/2304) (C.77) HTML PDF

== Section 77A ==
International Tribunals (Sierra Leone) Act 2007 (Note: Section 2(2).)
- Act of Parliament
- Parliament of the United Kingdom
- Long title: An Act to confer power to make provision in relation to the Special Court for Sierra Leone corresponding to that made in relation to the International Criminal Court by sections 42 to 48 of the International Criminal Court Act 2001.
- Citation: 2007 c. 7
- Introduced by: Kim Howells MP, Minister for the Middle East (Commons); Baroness Royall of Blaisdon (Lords)
- Territorial extent: England and Wales (Note: Section 2(1).)

Dates
- Royal assent: 18 June 2007
- Commencement: 18 June 2007 (Note: Section 4(b) of the Interpretation Act 1978.)
Other legislation
Amends	International Criminal Court 2001

Status: Current legislation

History of passage through Parliament

Text of statute as originally enacted

This section was inserted by section 1 (The Special Court for Sierra Leone) of the act of the Parliament of the United Kingdom called the International Tribunals (Sierra Leone) Act 2007 (c. 7). The International Tribunals (Sierra Leone) (Application of Provisions) Order 2007 (SI 2007/2140) was made under this section.

This act and the order made under it authorised the detention of Charles Taylor in the UK.

== See also ==
- Human rights in the United Kingdom
- International criminal law
- Völkerstrafgesetzbuch
