= Genocide Convention =

1948 United Nations resolution that legally defined genocide

Convention on the Prevention and Punishment of the Crime of Genocide
- Signed: 9 December 1948 (77 years, 9 months, 3 weeks and 2 days ago)
- Location: Palais de Chaillot, Paris, France
- Effective: 12 January 1951 (75 years, 8 months, 2 weeks and 6 days ago)
- Signatories: 39
- Parties: 154 (complete list)
- Depositary: Secretary-General of the United Nations

Full text
- Genocide Convention at Wikisource

The Convention on the Prevention and Punishment of the Crime of Genocide (CPPCG), or the Genocide Convention, is an international treaty that criminalizes genocide and obligates state parties to pursue the enforcement of its prohibition. It was the first legal instrument to codify genocide as a crime and the first human rights treaty unanimously adopted by the United Nations General Assembly on 9 December 1948, during the third session of the United Nations General Assembly. The Convention entered into force on 12 January 1951 and has 154 state parties as of September 2026.

The Genocide Convention was conceived largely in response to World War II, which saw atrocities such as the Holocaust that lacked an adequate description or legal definition. Polish-Jewish lawyer Raphael Lemkin, who had coined the term genocide in 1944 to describe Nazi policies in occupied Europe and the Armenian genocide, campaigned for its recognition as a crime under international law. Lemkin also linked colonialism with genocide, mentioning colonial genocides outside of Europe in his writings. In a 1946 resolution, the General Assembly recognized genocide as an international crime and called for the creation of a binding treaty to prevent and punish its perpetration. Subsequent discussions and negotiations among UN member states resulted in the CPPCG.

The Convention defines genocide as any of five "acts committed with intent to destroy, in whole or in part, a national, ethnic, racial or religious group". These five acts include killing members of the group, causing them serious bodily or mental harm, imposing living conditions intended to destroy the group, preventing births, and forcibly transferring children out of the group. Victims are targeted because of their real or perceived membership of a group, not randomly. The convention further criminalizes "complicity, attempt, or incitement of its commission". Member states are prohibited from engaging in genocide and are obligated to pursue the enforcement of this prohibition. All perpetrators are to be tried regardless of whether they are private individuals, public officials, or political leaders with sovereign immunity.

The CPPCG has influenced law at both the national and international level. Its definition of genocide has been adopted by international and hybrid tribunals, such as the International Criminal Court, and incorporated into the domestic law of several countries. Its provisions are widely considered to be reflective of customary law and therefore binding on all nations whether or not they are parties. The International Court of Justice (ICJ) has likewise ruled that the principles underlying the Convention represent a peremptory norm against genocide that no government can derogate. The Genocide Convention authorizes the mandatory jurisdiction of the ICJ to adjudicate disputes, leading to international litigation such as the Rohingya genocide case and the litigation over the 2022 Russian invasion of Ukraine.

== Definition of genocide ==
Article 2 of the Convention defines genocide as:

... any of the following acts committed with intent to destroy, in whole or in part, a national, ethnical, racial or religious group, as such:

(a) Killing members of the group;
(b) Causing serious bodily or mental harm to members of the group;
(c) Deliberately inflicting on the group conditions of life calculated to bring about its physical destruction in whole or in part;
(d) Imposing measures intended to prevent births within the group;
(e) Forcibly transferring children of the group to another group.

— Convention on the Prevention and Punishment of the Crime of Genocide, Article 2

The Genocide Convention establishes those five prohibited acts that, when committed with the requisite intent, amount to genocide. Article 3 defines the related crimes that can be punished under the convention:

(a) Genocide;
(b) Conspiracy to commit genocide;
(c) Direct and public incitement to commit genocide;
(d) Attempt to commit genocide;
(e) Complicity in genocide.

— Convention on the Prevention and Punishment of the Crime of Genocide, Article 3

The convention was passed to outlaw actions similar to the Armenian genocide and the Holocaust. Genocide is not just defined as wide-scale massacre-style killings that are visible and well-documented. The Genocide Convention's words "in whole or in part" were interpreted by the International Court of Justice in 2007 as follows:

In the first place, the intent must be to destroy at least a substantial part of the particular group. That is demanded by the very nature of the crime of genocide: since the object and purpose of the Convention as a whole is to prevent the intentional destruction of groups, the part targeted must be significant enough to have an impact on the group as a whole.

The 1987 U.S. statute implementing the Genocide Convention likewise says that the words "in part" mean "in substantial part" and furthermore:

[T]he term "substantial part" means a part of a group of such numerical significance that the destruction or loss of that part would cause the destruction of the group as a viable entity within the nation of which such group is a part.

The five broad types of genocidal violence, recognized by Article II of the Convention, can be described in more detail as follows.

=== Killing members of the group Article II(a) ===
While mass killing is not necessary for genocide to have been committed, it has been present in almost all recognized genocides. In certain instances, men and adolescent boys are singled out for murder in the early stages, such as in the genocide of the Yazidis by Daesh, the Ottoman Turks' genocide of the Armenians, and the Rohingya genocide by the Burmese security forces. Men and boys are typically subject to "fast" killings, such as by gunshot. Women and girls are more likely to die slower deaths by slashing, burning, or as a result of sexual violence. The jurisprudence of the International Criminal Tribunal for Rwanda (ICTR), among others, shows that both the initial executions and those that quickly follow other acts of extreme violence, such as rape and torture, are recognized as falling under the first prohibited act.

A less settled discussion is whether deaths that are further removed from the initial acts of violence can be addressed under this provision of the Genocide Convention. Legal scholars have posited, for example, that deaths resulting from other genocidal acts, including causing serious bodily or mental harm or the successful deliberate infliction of conditions of life calculated to bring about physical destruction, should be considered genocidal killings.

=== Causing serious bodily or mental harm to members of the group Article II(b) ===
This second prohibited act can encompass a wide range of non-fatal genocidal acts. The ICTR and International Criminal Tribunal for the former Yugoslavia (ICTY) have held that rape and sexual violence may constitute the second prohibited act of genocide by causing both physical and mental harm. In its landmark Akayesu decision, the ICTR held that rapes and sexual violence resulted in "physical and psychological destruction". Sexual violence is a hallmark of genocidal violence, with most genocidal campaigns explicitly or implicitly sanctioning it. It is estimated that 250,000 to 500,000 women were raped in the three months of the Rwandan genocide, many of whom were subjected to multiple rapes or gang rape. In Darfur, a systemic campaign of rape and often sexual mutilation was carried out, and in Burma, public mass rapes and gang rapes were inflicted on the Rohingya by Burmese security forces. Sexual slavery was documented in the Armenian genocide by the Ottoman Turks and Daesh's genocide of the Yazidi.

Torture and other cruel, inhuman, or degrading treatment or punishment, when committed with the requisite intent, are also genocide by causing serious bodily or mental harm to members of the group. The ICTY found that both experiencing a failed execution and watching the murder of one's family members may constitute torture. The Syrian Commission of Inquiry (COI) also found that enslavement, removal of one's children into indoctrination or sexual slavery, and acts of physical and sexual violence rise to the level of torture as well. While it was subject to some debate, the ICTY and later the Syrian COI held that under some circumstances deportation and forcible transfer may also cause serious bodily or mental harm.

=== Deliberately inflicting on the group conditions of life calculated to bring about its physical destruction Article II(c) ===
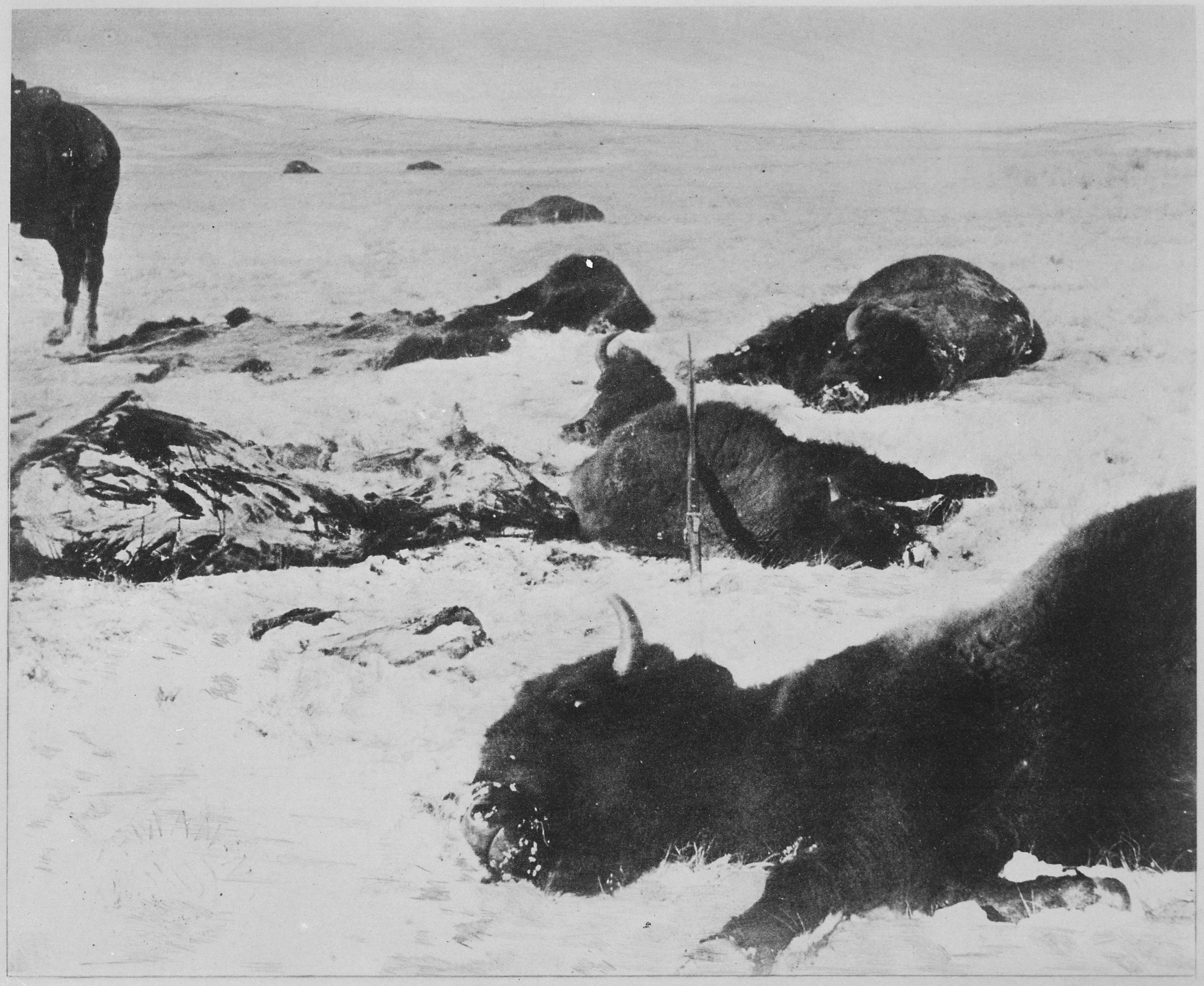
During the Indian wars, the U.S. federal government promoted bison hunting for various reasons, including as a way of destroying the means of survival of Plains Indians to pressure them to remain on Indian reservations. This has been cited by experts as an example of genocide that involves removing the means of survival.

The third prohibited act is distinguished from the genocidal act of killing because the deaths are not immediate (or may not even come to pass), but rather create circumstances that do not support prolonged life. Due to the longer period of time before the actual destruction would be achieved, the ICTR held that courts must consider the duration of time the conditions are imposed as an element of the act. In the 19th century the United States federal government supported the extermination of bison, which Native Americans in the Great Plains relied on as a source of food. This was done for various reasons, primarily to pressure them onto reservations during times of conflict. Some genocide experts describe this as an example of genocide that involves removing the means of survival.

The ICTR provided guidance into what constitutes a violation of the third act. In Akayesu, it identified "subjecting a group of people to a subsistence diet, systematic expulsion from homes and the reduction of essential medical services below minimum requirement" as rising to genocide. In Kayishema and Ruzindana, it extended the list to include "lack of proper housing, clothing, hygiene and medical care or excessive work or physical exertion" among the conditions. It further noted that, in addition to deprivation of necessary resources, rape could also fit within this prohibited act. In August 2023, founding chief prosecutor of the International Criminal Court (ICC) Luis Moreno Ocampo published a report presenting evidence that Azerbaijan was committing genocide against the ethnic Armenians of Artsakh Nagorno-Karabakh under Article II(c) of the Genocide Convention by placing their historic land under a comprehensive blockade, cutting all access to food, medical supplies, electricity, gas, internet, and stopping all movement of people to and from Armenia.

=== Imposing measures intended to prevent births within the group Article II(d) ===
The fourth prohibited act is aimed at preventing the protected group from regenerating through reproduction. It encompasses acts affecting reproduction and intimate relationships, such as involuntary sterilization, forced abortion, the prohibition of marriage, and long-term separation of men and women intended to prevent procreation. Rape has been found to violate the fourth prohibited act on two bases: where the rape was committed with the intent to impregnate a woman and thereby force her to carry a child of another group (in societies where group identity is determined by patrilineal identity) and where the person raped subsequently refuses to procreate as a result of the trauma. Accordingly, it can take into account both physical and mental measures imposed by the perpetrators.

=== Forcibly transferring children of the group to another group Article II(e) ===
The final prohibited act is the only prohibited act that does not lead to physical or biological destruction, but rather to the destruction of the group as a cultural and social unit. It occurs when children of the protected group are transferred to the perpetrator group. Boys are typically taken into the group by changing their names to those common of the perpetrator group, converting their religion, and using them for labor or as soldiers. Girls who are transferred are not generally converted to the perpetrator group, but instead treated as chattel, as played out in both the Yazidi and Armenian genocides.

== Parties ==
Participation in the Genocide Convention Signed and ratified Acceded or succeeded Only signed

As of September 2026, there are 154 state parties to the Genocide Convention—representing the vast majority of sovereign nations—with the most recent being Djibouti in February 2026; one state, the Dominican Republic, has signed but not ratified the treaty. Forty-four states have neither signed nor ratified the convention.

Despite its delegates playing a key role in drafting the convention, the United States did not become a party until 1988—a full forty years after it was opened for signature—and did so only with reservations precluding punishment of the country if it were ever accused of genocide. These were due to traditional American suspicion of any international authority that could override US law. U.S. ratification of the convention was owed in large part to campaigning by Senator William Proxmire, who addressed the Senate in support of the treaty every day it was in session between 1967 and 1986.

=== Reservations ===
==== Immunity from prosecutions ====
Several parties conditioned their ratification of the Convention on reservations that grant immunity from prosecution for genocide without the consent of the national government:

Parties making reservations from prosecution	Note
Bahrain	
Bangladesh	
China	
India	
Malaysia	Opposed by Netherlands, United Kingdom
Morocco	
Myanmar	
Singapore	Opposed by Netherlands, United Kingdom
United Arab Emirates	
United States of America	Opposed by Denmark, Estonia, Finland, Greece, Ireland, Italy, Mexico, Netherlands, Norway, Spain, Sweden, Turkey, and United Kingdom
Venezuela	
Vietnam	Opposed by United Kingdom
Yemen	Opposed by United Kingdom

==== Application to non-self-governing territories ====
Any Contracting Party may at any time, by notification addressed to the Secretary-General of the United Nations, extend the application of the present Convention to all or any of the territories for the conduct of whose foreign relations that Contracting Party is responsible

— Convention on the Prevention and Punishment of the Crime of Genocide, Article 12

Several countries opposed this article, considering that the convention automatically also should apply to Non-Self-Governing Territories:

- Albania
- Belarus
- Bulgaria
- Hungary
- Mongolia
- Myanmar
- Poland
- Romania
- (Russia) Russian Federation
- Ukraine

The opposition of those countries were in turn opposed by:

- Australia
- Belgium
- Brazil
- Ecuador
- China
- Netherlands
- Sri Lanka
- United Kingdom

(However, exceptionally, Australia did make such a notification at the same time as they ratification of the convention, on 8 July 1949, with the effect that the convention did apply also to all territories under Australian control simultaneously, as the USSR et alii had demanded. The European colonial powers in general did not then make such notifications.)

== Litigation ==
=== United States ===
One of the first accusations of genocide submitted to the UN after the Convention entered into force concerned the treatment of Black Americans. The Civil Rights Congress drafted a 237-page petition arguing that even after 1945, the United States had been responsible for hundreds of wrongful deaths, both legal and extra-legal, as well as numerous other supposedly genocidal abuses. Leaders from the Black community and left activists William Patterson, Paul Robeson, and W. E. B. Du Bois presented this petition to the UN in December 1951. It was rejected as a misuse of the intent of the treaty. Charges under We Charge Genocide entailed the lynching of more than 10,000 African Americans with an average of more than 100 per year, with the full number being unconfirmed at the time due to unreported murder cases.

=== Yugoslavia ===
The first state and parties to be found in breach of the Genocide Convention were Serbia and Montenegro and numerous Bosnian Serb leaders. In Bosnia and Herzegovina v. Serbia and Montenegro, the International Court of Justice presented its judgment on 26 February 2007. It cleared Serbia of direct involvement in genocide during the Bosnian war. International Tribunal findings have addressed two allegations of genocidal events, including the 1992 ethnic cleansing campaign in municipalities throughout Bosnia, as well as the convictions found in regards to the Srebrenica massacre of 1995 in which the tribunal found, "Bosnian Serb forces committed genocide, they targeted for extinction, the 40,000 Bosnian Muslims of Srebrenica ... the trial chamber refers to the crimes by their appropriate name, genocide ..." However, individual convictions applicable to the 1992 ethnic cleansings have not been secured. A number of domestic courts and legislatures have found these events to have met the criteria of genocide, and the ICTY found the acts of, and intent to destroy to have been satisfied, the "dolus specialis" still in question and before the MICT, a UN war crimes court, but ruled that Belgrade did breach international law by failing to prevent the 1995 Srebrenica genocide, and for failing to try or transfer the persons accused of genocide to the ICTY to comply with its obligations under Articles I and VI of the Genocide Convention, in particular in respect of General Ratko Mladić.

=== Myanmar ===
Myanmar has been accused of genocide against its Rohingya community in Rakhine State after around 800,000 Rohingya fled at gunpoint to neighbouring Bangladesh in 2016 and 2017, while their home villages were systematically burned. The International Court of Justice issued its first circular in 2018, asking Myanmar to protect its Rohingya from genocide. Myanmar's civilian government was overthrown by the military on 1 February 2021; since the military is widely seen as the main culprit of the genocide, the coup presents a further challenge to the ICJ.

=== Russia ===
==== Russian accusations of genocide by Ukraine ====
In February 2022, Russia invaded Ukraine, with Russian officials justifying the action by alleging that Ukraine had carried out acts of genocide and targeted the civilian population in separatist-held regions. This accusation has been described by some critics as an example of "accusation in a mirror", a form of incitement to genocide.

==== Russian atrocities in Ukraine ====
Russian forces committed numerous atrocities and war crimes in Ukraine, including all five of the potentially genocidal acts listed in the Genocide Convention. Canada, Czechia, Estonia, Ireland, Latvia, Lithuania, Poland, and Ukraine have accused Russia of genocide. In April 2022 Genocide Watch issued a genocide alert for Ukraine. A May 2022 report by 35 legal and genocide experts concluded that Russia has violated the Genocide Convention by the direct and public incitement to commit genocide, and that a pattern of Russian atrocities implies the intent to destroy the Ukrainian national group, and the consequent serious risk of genocide triggers the obligation to prevent it on signatory states.

=== Israel ===
In December 2023 South Africa formally accused Israel of violating the Genocide Convention, filing the case South Africa v. Israel (Genocide Convention), due to Israel's actions during the Gaza war. In addition to starting the litigation process, South Africa also asked the International Court of Justice to demand that Israel cease its military operations in the Gaza Strip as a provisional measure.

== Criticism ==
The first draft of the Convention included political cleansing of populations. The Convention initially voted to pass the inclusion of political groups into its definition of genocide, but the USSR, Egypt, Norway, Sweden, Britain, the Dominican Republic, the Uruguay, Venezuela, Brazil, Peru, Belgium, Poland would not accept that actions against groups identified as holding similar political opinions or social status would constitute genocide. Member states including Iran, Uruguay, and Egypt motioned to reopen the discussion in the convention. These groups reasoned that actions regarding political genocide did not meet criteria of genocide based on the following five arguments:

(a) Political groups are voluntary and therefore not homogenous

(b) It would discourage member states from participating in the Convention due to fear of external interference within member states
(c) Causes difficulties for member states to enact preventative measures against subversive groups
(d) The question of excluding political groups would lead to debates on other groups, including economic and professional groups
(e) The Declaration of Human Rights and national governments should protect and enforce the rights of all citizens, so protections from human rights violations should be encompassed within these jurisdictions instead of the UN's definition of genocide.

Based on these arguments, these stipulations were subsequently removed in a political and diplomatic compromise. However, debate within scholarly realms and activism have noted severe flaws that have resulted from the Convention's intentional exclusion of political groups as victim groups.

Early drafts also included acts of cultural genocide, but these were opposed by former European colonial powers and some settler countries. Such acts, which Lemkin saw as part and parcel of the concept of genocide, have since often been discussed as cultural genocide (a term also not enshrined in international law). In June 2021, the International Criminal Court issued new guidelines for how cultural destruction, when occurring alongside other recognized acts of genocide, can potentially be corroborating evidence for the intent of the crime of genocide.

== See also ==
- List of parties to the Genocide Convention
- States parties to the Rome Statute of the International Criminal Court
- Rome Statute
- List of genocides
- Outline of genocide studies
- Incitement to genocide
