= Genocide law (Albania) =

The law "On Genocide and Crimes Against Humanity Committed in Albania during the Communist Regime for Political, Ideological and Religious Motives" (Nr. 8001, September 22, 1995)) was enacted in Albania with the purpose of expediting the prosecution of the violations of the basic human rights and freedoms by the former communist governments of the Socialist People's Republic of Albania. The law has also been referred to in English as the "Genocide law" and the "Law on Communist Genocide".

The law excluded, until December 31, 2001, from government, parliament and judiciary, and mass media positions any higher political officials who held office in Albania prior to March 31, 1991, i.e., who held higher positions in Communist Albania: members of politburo, Central Committee, parliament, as well as former secret police agents and informers. It was similar to decommunization efforts in other former communist states.

A person may run for an office after an investigation of their "moral character" by a special state commission. The commission decision may be appealed before the Cassation Court. The law was effected a short time before the elections, and many candidates were prevented from standing, simply because the verification stages could not be carried out on time.

The affected politicians claimed that it was intended to strengthen the hold of Sali Berisha on power.

An attempt to repeal the law basing on its alleged unconstitutionality was rejected by the constitutional court on January 31, 1996. However some provisions of the law were stricken out.

Basing on this law, former President Ramiz Alia, previously amnestied, was imprisoned again, now on charges for crime against humanity. Some decried this application of the law as an example of double jeopardy.

The law lasted only two years, because it was repealed during the 1997 rebellion in Albania, and eventually formerly banned politicians entered the coalition government.
