= Fraud Act 2006 =

Act of the Parliament of the United Kingdom

Fraud Act 2006 (Note: Section 16.)
- Act of Parliament
- Parliament of the United Kingdom
- Long title: An Act to make provision for, and in connection with, criminal liability for fraud and obtaining services dishonestly.
- Citation: 2006 c. 35
- Territorial extent: England and Wales; Northern Ireland; (Note: Section 15(2)–(4).)

Dates
- Royal assent: 8 November 2006
- Commencement: 15 January 2007 (Note: Section 15(1). The Fraud Act 2006 (Commencement) Order 2006 (SI 2006/3200).)
Other legislation
Amends	Theft Act 1968; Theft Act 1978; Limitation Act 1980; Nuclear Material (Offences) Act 1983; Criminal Justice Act 1993; Terrorism Act 2000
Amended by	Sentencing Act 2020

Status: Amended

History of passage through Parliament

Text of statute as originally enacted

Revised text of statute as amended

The Fraud Act 2006 (c. 35) is an act of the Parliament of the United Kingdom which affects England and Wales and Northern Ireland. It was given royal assent on 8 November 2006, and came into effect on 15 January 2007.

== Purpose ==
The main purpose of the act was to create a general offence of fraud.

The act gives a statutory definition of the criminal offence of fraud, defining it in three classes – fraud by false representation, fraud by failing to disclose information, and fraud by abuse of position. It provides that a person found guilty of fraud was liable to a fine or imprisonment for up to twelve months on summary conviction (six months in Northern Ireland), or a fine or imprisonment for up to ten years on conviction on indictment. This Act largely replaces the laws relating to obtaining property by deception, obtaining a pecuniary advantage and other offences that were created under the Theft Act 1978. These offences attracted much criticism for their complexity and difficulty in proving at court. Much of the Theft Act 1978 has been repealed, but the offence of making off without payment, defined under section 3, has not been affected.

- "Fraud by false representation" is defined by Section 2 of the Act as a case where a person makes "any representation as to fact or law ... express or implied" which they know to be untrue or misleading.
- "Fraud by failing to disclose information" is defined by Section 3 of the Act as a case where a person fails to disclose any information to a third party when they are under a legal duty to disclose such information.
- "Fraud by abuse of position" is defined by Section 4 of the Act as a case where a person occupies a position where they are expected to safeguard the financial interests of another person, and abuses that position; this includes cases where the abuse consisted of an omission rather than an overt act.

In all three classes of fraud, it requires that for an offence to have occurred, the person must have acted dishonestly, and that they had to have acted with the intent of making a gain for themselves or anyone else, or inflicting a loss (or a risk of loss) on another.

The act also creates an offence of being in possession of articles for use in fraud.

=== Gain and loss ===
A "gain" or a "loss" is defined to consist only of a gain or a loss in money or property (including intangible property), but could be temporary or permanent. A "gain" could be construed as gaining by keeping their existing possessions, not just by obtaining new ones, and loss included losses of expected acquisitions, as well as losses of already-held property.

The Act creates two "supporting" offences, these being the possession of articles for use in frauds (Section 6) and the making or supplying of articles for use in frauds (Section 7).

== Obtaining services dishonestly ==
Section 11 of the Act makes it a statutory offence to obtain services dishonestly; meaning that services which were to be paid for were obtained with the knowledge or intention that no payment would be made. A person found guilty of this will be liable to a fine or imprisonment for up to twelve months on summary conviction (six months in Northern Ireland), or a fine or imprisonment for up to five years on conviction on indictment.

== Companies and fraudulent business ==
In regard to the fraudulent behaviour of companies, the existing offence of participating in fraudulent business carried on by a company, provided for by the Companies Act 1985, was amended by Section 10 – bringing the maximum penalty from 10 years imprisonment to 15 years (and/or a fine) – and a new offence of participating in fraudulent business carried on by a sole trader was established by Section 9.

Section 12 of the Act provides that where an offence against the Act was committed by a body corporate, but was carried out with the "consent or connivance" of any director, manager, secretary or officer of the body – or any person purporting to be such – then that person, as well as the body itself, is liable.

An important difference between this and the Theft Act is that the Fraud Act offences do not require there to have been a victim, as was the case with the Theft Act.

Some Trading Standards services have already used the Act against bogus charity collectors and it can be used for some matters that were previously dealt with under repealed sections of the Trade Descriptions Act 1968 (e.g. car-clocking).

== See also ==
- PFI Convention
