= Vednita Carter =

American abolitionist

- Born: Twin Cities, Minnesota, U.S.
- Occupations: Author; activist
- Years active: 1996–present
- Title: Founder and executive director of Breaking Free

Vednita Carter is an American anti-sex trafficking and anti-prostitution activist. Carter is an author and the executive director of Breaking Free, an organization which helps women seeking to leave prostitution.

== Biography ==
Carter grew up in Minneapolis–Saint Paul, Minnesota. Unable to afford college, she responded to an advertisement seeking dancers, which she later discovered was for a position as a stripper. Carter observed that many women in her profession transitioned into prostitution. She worked in the industry for a year before leaving.

In 1989, Carter began to work with women in prostitution in Minnesota at a different agency, which later closed, and became program director. In 1996, Carter founded Breaking Free, an organization that aids girls and women in exiting prostitution. She subsequently became the executive director of Breaking Free, and the program expanded to provide additional support services, including emergency assistance such as food, clothing, shelter, medical care, and legal aid for victims of human trafficking. By 1998, the organization rented an apartment block to permanently re-house women and girls, and by 2010, they had more apartments and three "transitional houses". In 2015, the housing block named "Jerry's Place", named after Saint Paul Police Department Sgt. Gerald Vick, closed due to funding issues.

In their book Juvenile Justice: Advancing Research, Policy, and Practice, Francine Sherman and Francine Jacobs call Carter "a leading service provider for exploited women and girls".

Carter has been published in Hastings Women's Law Journal, the Michigan Journal of Gender and Law, and the Journal of Trauma Practice. Carter contributed the piece "Prostitution = Slavery" to the 2003 anthology Sisterhood Is Forever: The Women's Anthology for a New Millennium, edited by Robin Morgan.

Before founding Breaking Free in 1996, Carter worked with women and girls involved in prostitution and domestic violence in Minnesota. She developed and directed the Women’s Services Program at WHISPER (Women Hurt in Systems of Prostitution Engaged in Revolt), where she helped women leave prostitution and abusive situations. She also counseled incarcerated women through the Rivers of Life prison ministry program. These experiences influenced her decision to establish Breaking Free, which initially focused on helping women and girls escape prostitution and later expanded its services to support people affected by sexual exploitation and sex trafficking.

== Activism ==
Breaking Free is a non-profit organization based in St. Paul, Minnesota with the goal of helping women escape prostitution. Breaking Free provides a variety of services to the women. These services include food, clothing, and emotional support. Breaking Free also provides addiction services, permanent and temporary housing, as well as legal assistance and job training. The services are offered with no strings attached.

Since 1996, Breaking Free has helped over 6,000 women.

Carter also established a "John School", which educates men arrested for solicitation about the effects of their actions to persuade them not to solicit again. Carter believes that as long as men continue to purchase sexual favors, sex trafficking will not end.

Breaking Free created a range of services to help women and girls leave prostitution and rebuild their lives. These services include emergency support, housing, legal help, job training and employment assistance, and support for substance use. The organization also reaches out to women involved in prostitution and works with law enforcement and community groups to address sexual exploitation and sex trafficking. Carter also created a “John School” program through Breaking Free to reduce the demand for commercial sex. The program was aimed at men arrested for buying sex and taught them about the harms of prostitution and sexual exploitation. Her work to reduce demand became an important part of her wider advocacy against sex trafficking and commercial sexual exploitation.

Carter also worked to change how women and girls involved in prostitution were treated. She encouraged law enforcement and the public to see exploited women as victims rather than criminals. Her approach focused on providing help and support instead of mainly using arrest and punishment. This became an important part of her work with Breaking Free, where she helped women leave prostitution and address the circumstances that led to their exploitation. Under Carter’s leadership, Breaking Free created a victim-centered case management program and developed transitional and permanent supportive housing for sex trafficking survivors. These programs strengthened the organization’s advocacy and direct services by offering long-term support to women and girls working to escape exploitation.

== Awards ==
Carter won the 2010 Survivor Centered-Service Provider category from the Norma Hotaling Award.

Carter was one of six women granted the Women of Distinction award by Century College in 2012.

Carter was awarded the Path Breaker Award from Shared Hope International in 2014. That same year, she was also named a CNN Hero.

In 2015, she was awarded an honorary Doctorate of Divinity, Ambassador-at-Large and Chaplaincy from CICAInternational University and Seminary.

Carter was honored by Shared Hope International with the Path Breaker Award (in 2014) and was also recognized as a CNN Hero for her work helping victims of sexual exploitation and human trafficking.

== Professional training and public advocacy ==
Carter’s advocacy has focused on educating and training professionals who work with victims of sexual exploitation and human trafficking. Through Breaking Free, she provided training and support to law-enforcement officers, including members of the FBI and local police departments. She also spoke with members of Congress and other community and professional organizations. In addition, Carter worked as a consultant for the U.S. Department of Justice.

In September 2014, Carter testified before the U.S. House Committee on Energy and Commerce in support of legislation that would provide trafficking-awareness training for health-care professionals. During her testimony, she described Breaking Free as a survivor-led organization that offers services and educational programs to women and girls affected by sexual exploitation. Carter also took part in national and international discussions about prostitution and sex trafficking. In 1997, she spoke at the United Nations about prostitution and its effects on African American women. Later, she participated in discussions about domestic sex trafficking and efforts to combat human trafficking.

== Race and prostitution ==
Race and racial inequality were important parts of Carter’s work on prostitution. In her article (i.e. in 1993), she wrote about the experiences of Black women and how racism and sexism can affect them. Her later work likewise looked at the problems faced by African American women in prostitution and the challenges of providing them with support. In her article (2004), “Providing Services to African American Prostituted Women,” Carter wrote in regards to the experiences of African American women involved in prostitution. She illustrated how Breaking Free helped these women and what services it offered. Carter mentioned that support programs should understand the specific experiences, and needs of African American women.

== Offenders Prostitution Program ==
Breaking Free started the Offenders Prostitution Program in 1999. It was also called a “John School” and was designed for men who had been arrested for buying sex. The program was created with help from local police, the city attorney’s office, survivors, and other community members. Instead of only focusing on punishment, the program taught men in regards to the health, social, community, and human effects of buying sex. In the meantime, it was also part of Katherine Carter’s larger effort to reduce the demand for commercial sex.

== Selected bibliography ==
I know that working with women and girls who have been used in prostitution/trafficking is my destiny in this life. ... it is what I am meant to do. When I think about the millions of women and children throughout the world who are exploited and have no other options to change the course of their life, I feel compelled to do all that I can do to help them in some way.

— Vednita Carter explaining her motivations for her work

=== Chapters in books ===
- Carter, Vednita (2003). "Prostitution = Slavery". In Morgan, Robin (ed.). Sisterhood is forever: the women's anthology for a new millennium. New York, New York: Washington Square Press. pp. 315–324. ISBN 9780743466271. Details.
- Carter, Vednita (2004). "Prostitution and the new slavery". In Whisnant, Rebecca; Stark, Christine (eds.). Not for sale: feminists resisting prostitution and pornography. North Melbourne, Victoria: Spinifex Press. pp. 85–88. ISBN 9781876756499.
- Carter, Vednita (2004). "Providing services to African American prostituted women". In Farley, Melissa (ed.). Prostitution, trafficking and traumatic stress. Binghamton, New York: Haworth Maltreatment & Trauma Press. pp. 213–222. ISBN 9781136764905. Pdf.
- Carter, Vednita; Giobbe, Evelina (2006). "Duet: prostitution, racism and feminist discourse". In Spector, Jessica (ed.). Prostitution and pornography: philosophical debate about the sex industry. Stanford, California: Stanford University Press. pp. 17–39. ISBN 9780804749381.

=== Journal articles ===
- Carter, Vednita (1993). "Prostitution: where racism & sexism intersect". Michigan Journal of Gender and Law. 1: 81–89. Pdf.
- Carter, Vednita; Giobbe, Evelina (1999). "Duet: prostitution, racism and feminist discourse". Hastings Women's Law Journal, Symposium Issue: Economic Justice for Sex Workers. 10 (1): 37–58. Pdf.
- Carter, Vednita (January 2004). "Providing services to African American prostituted women". Journal of Trauma Practice. 2 (3–4): 213–222. doi:10.1300/J189v02n03_03. S2CID 153827303.
