= Battered woman syndrome =

Condition resulting from emotional, physical, or sexual abuse

- Other names: Battered person syndrome
- Specialty: Psychology
- Symptoms: See Symptoms
- Causes: Intimate partner violence, depression, passivity, and lack of social support outside of the abusive situation
- Diagnostic method: See Diagnosis

Battered woman syndrome (BWS) is a pattern of signs and symptoms displayed by a woman who has suffered persistent intimate partner violence—psychological, physical, or sexual—from her partner (usually male). Although the diagnosis has mainly centered on women, it has occasionally been applied to men when employing the term battered person syndrome, especially as part of a legal defense. It is classified in the ICD-11 (code 6B40) and the ICD-9 (code 995.81) as battered person syndrome, but is not in the DSM-5.

The condition was first researched extensively by Lenore E. Walker, who used Martin Seligman's learned helplessness theory to explain why women stayed in relationships with abusive men. Victims may exhibit a range of behaviors, including self-isolation, suicidal thoughts, and substance abuse, and signs of physical injury or illness, such as bruises, broken bones, or chronic fatigue. It may be diagnosed as a subcategory of post-traumatic stress disorder (PTSD).

The condition is the basis for the battered woman legal defense that has been used in cases of physically and psychologically abused women who have killed their male partners. As a legal defense, it may be incorporated in defenses such as self defense-, provocation-, and insanity-based defenses.

The term "battered woman syndrome" has been criticized by some social workers specializing in domestic violence, as being outdated terminology not used outside of courts.

== Concept and terminology ==
In 1979, Lenore E. Walker proposed the concept of battered woman syndrome (BWS). She described it as consisting "of the pattern of the signs and symptoms that have been found to occur after a woman has been physically, sexually, and/or psychologically abused in an intimate relationship, when the partner exerted power and control over the woman to coerce her into doing whatever he wanted, without regard for her rights or feelings."

Walker stated, "As there are significant differences between the theory underlying the construct of BWS, and to date there are no empirically supported data, it has not yet been applied to men. Therefore, the term used is BWS rather than a gender-neutral battered person syndrome (BPS) or even battered man syndrome (BMS). Of course, men are abused by women, but the psychological impact on the man does not appear to be consistent with trauma in most cases."

Occasionally, the term battered person syndrome has been used to apply to men, especially as part of a legal defense. Author John Hamel stated that although the term BWS has been replaced with battered person's syndrome in some legal circles, "and sounds more politically neutral, the new term does not improve on the former in providing a unitary syndrome, and does not account for the characteristics unique to male victimization."

== Diagnosis ==
ICD9 code 995.81 lists the syndrome under "battered woman/man/spouse/person NEC", and categorizes it as any person presenting with identified physical descriptors rather than psychological descriptors. It falls under the general heading of "Adult physical abuse", classified under "Injury and Poisoning".

The diagnosis, especially with regard to posttraumatic stress disorder (PTSD), has mainly centered on women. The DSM-IV-TR does not provide a distinct diagnostic category for reactions to battering. The diverse reactions of battered women are treated as separate diagnoses; for example, PTSD or depression. Because there are no subcategories of the diagnosis of posttraumatic stress disorder in the DSM-5, the diagnosis is absent from the manual. It may, however, be used as a classification to guide treatment plans and forensic issues.

== Symptoms ==
Symptoms of battered woman syndrome, a few of which are shared with PTSD
Symptoms	Battered woman syndrome	Post-traumatic stress disorder (PTSD)
The person fears for their life	check	check
Is fearful for more than 4 weeks	check	check
Performance at work or other important daily life activities is affected	check	check
Manipulated through threats of violence, unwanted sex, degradation, isolation and more	check	
Dislike their bodies and experience somatic health issues	check	
Sexual intimacy issues	check	

When battered woman syndrome (BWS) manifests as PTSD, it consists of the following symptoms: (a) re-experiencing the battering as if it were recurring even when it is not, (b) attempts to avoid the psychological impact of battering by avoiding activities, people, and emotions, (c) hyperarousal or hypervigilance, (d) disrupted interpersonal relationships, (e) body image distortion or other somatic concerns, and (f) sexuality and intimacy issues.

Additionally, repeated cycles of violence and reconciliation can result in the following beliefs and attitudes:

- The abused thinks that the violence was their fault.
- The abused has an inability to place the responsibility for the violence elsewhere.
- The abused fears for their life or the lives of loved ones whom the abuser might or has threatened to harm (e.g., children-in-common, close relatives, or friends).
- The abused has an irrational belief that the abuser is omnipresent and omniscient.

== Causes ==
The syndrome develops in response to a three-stage cycle found in intimate partner violence situations. First, tension builds in the relationship. Second, the abusive partner releases tension via violence while blaming the victim for having caused the violence. Third, the violent partner makes gestures of contrition. However, the partner does not find solutions to avoid another phase of tension building and release so the cycle repeats. The repetition of the violence, despite the abuser's attempts to "make nice", results in the abused partner feeling at fault for not preventing a repeat cycle of violence. However, since the victim is not at fault and the violence is internally driven by the abuser, this self-blame results in feelings of helplessness rather than empowerment. The feeling of being both responsible for and helpless to stop the violence leads in turn to depression and passivity. This learned depression and passivity makes it difficult for the abused partner to marshal the resources and support system needed to leave.

Feelings of depression and passivity may also be created by lack of social support outside of the abusive situation. Research in the 1980s by Gondolf and Fisher found that women in abusive situations increase help-seeking behavior as violence intensifies. However, their attempts at seeking help are often frustrated by unresponsive extended family and social services. In a 2002 study, Gondolf found that more than half of women had negative views of shelters and programs for battered women because of negative experiences with those programs.

== In legal cases ==
In the US, the battered woman syndrome as a legal defense started to be developed in the 1970s. In 1977 in the US, Francine Hughes's trial for the murder of her husband was one of the first cases involving what was later called battered-woman syndrome as a defense.

A legal defense using BWS may argue that the systematic abuse suffered by the victim of domestic violence has led her to believe that killing the abuser was the only way to avoid being killed herself and may rely on self-defense or imperfect self defense. Alternatively, the victim may argue that the abuse has severely affected her mental state, in which case the insanity defense or diminished responsibility defense may be used. Provocation is another defense that may be used. A legal defense using BWS seeks to obtain an acquittal, a mitigated sentence or a conviction of a lesser offense.

In the UK, battered woman syndrome emerged as a legal defense in the 1990s, as a result of several murder cases in England involving women who had killed violent partners in response to what they described as cumulative abuse rather than in response to a single provocative act.

In a series of appeals against murder convictions, feminist groups (particularly Southall Black Sisters and Justice for Women) challenged the legal definition of provocation and secured the courts' recognition of battered woman syndrome.

Until the mid-1990s, the legal definition of provocation in England had relied on Devlin J in R v Duffy [1949] 1 All ER 932: "Provocation is some act, or series of acts done (or words spoken) ... which would cause in any reasonable person and actually causes in the accused, a sudden and temporary loss of self-control, rendering the accused so subject to passion as to make him or her for the moment not master of his or her mind." Three cases helped to change this: R v Ahluwalia [1992] 4 AER 889; R v Humphreys [1995] 4 All ER 1008); and R v Thornton (No 2) [1996] 2 AER 1023.

The Coroners and Justice Act 2009 replaced the defence of provocation in English law with the loss of control defence. In addition to loss of control, diminished responsibility in English law is also an available defense.

The courts in Australia, Canada, New Zealand, the United Kingdom, and the United States have accepted the extensive and growing body of research showing that battered women can use force to defend themselves. This may include even killing their abusers because of the abusive, and sometimes life-threatening, situation in which they find themselves. These women act in the firm belief that there is no other way than to kill for self-preservation. The courts have recognized that this evidence may support a variety of defenses to a charge of murder or to mitigate the sentence if convicted of lesser offenses.

Under the term battered person syndrome, the defense has occasionally been used by men in reference to their abusive spouses.

Battered woman syndrome is not a legal defense in and of itself, but may legally constitute:

- Self-defense when using a reasonable and proportionate degree of violence in response to the abuse might appear the most appropriate defense but, until recently, it almost never succeeded. Research in 1996 in England found no case in which a battered woman successfully pleaded self-defense (see Noonan at p. 198). After analyzing 239 appellate decisions on trials of women who killed in self-defense in the U.S., Maguigan (1991) argues that self-defense is gender biased.
- imperfect self defense;
- provocation;
- insanity (usually within the meaning of the M'Naghten Rules); and
- diminished responsibility.

In recent years, BWS has been questioned as a legal defense on several grounds. First, legal changes in many states now make it possible to admit a history of past abuse into evidence. Second, not all battered persons act the same. Third, it pleads pathology when there may, in fact, be completely rational reasons for the victim's assessment that their life or that of their children was in danger. For example, if life-threatening attacks were preceded by a certain look in the eyes in the past, the victim may have had probable cause for believing that another life-threatening attack was likely to occur. Fourth, it does not provide for the possibility that a person may be abused, but have chosen to kill for reasons other than on-going abuse – for example, jealousy or greed. Fifth, it paints survivors of domestic violence exclusively as passive victims rather than resourceful survivors. Controversy has also surrounded the legal mechanisms of the use of the BWS, which usually rely on the use of existing general legal defenses, such as self-defense, provocation or insanity based defenses – defenses which themselves have been subjected to controversy regarding their exact definitions and standards with regard to the burden of proof needed in court, given that the broad application of these defenses may provide a "license to kill" to the people, including to abusive men who kill their partners and claim such defenses and blame the victim for being killed. The broadening of self-defense laws in the US has been especially controversial due to fears about its potential abuse.

The effectiveness of new laws in "reducing the incidence of domestic violence, however, has been limited for a number of reasons." A major barrier "to using these laws to protect women is that proving domestic violence in court is difficult. First, the victim is often the only witness to the abuse. For a variety of reasons, victims are reluctant to testify against their abusers and pursue civil and criminal remedies." Even when those who experience domestic violence do testify, they "are often not believed. Despite changes in legal and popular conceptions of domestic violence, judges and juries continue to ignore or discount victims' testimony about the abuse."

=== England ===
In R v Ahluwalia (1992) 4 AER 889 a woman (Kiranjit Ahluwalia) created napalm and set fire to the bed of her husband, Deepak, after he had gone to sleep. He suffered severe burns over 40% of his body and died 10 days later in the hospital. He allegedly had attempted to break her ankles and burn her with a hot iron on the night of her attack. Accusing him of domestic violence and marital rape, she claimed provocation. The judge directed the jury to consider whether, if she did lose her self-control, a reasonable person having the characteristics of a well-educated married Asian woman living in England would have lost her self-control given her husband's provocation. On appeal, it was argued that he should have directed the jury to consider a reasonable person suffering from "battered woman syndrome". Having considered fresh medical evidence, the Court of Appeal ordered a retrial on the basis that the new evidence showed an arguable case of diminished responsibility in English law.

Similarly, in R v Thornton (No 2) (1996) 2 AER 1023, the battered wife adduced fresh evidence that she had a personality disorder and the Court of Appeal ordered a retrial considering that, if the evidence had been available at the original trial, the jury might have reached a different decision. The victim does not have to be in a position to carry out the threats immediately.

In R v Charlton (2003) EWCA Crim 415, following threats of sexual and violent abuse against herself and her daughter, the defendant killed her obsessive, jealous, controlling partner while he was restrained by handcuffs, blindfolded and gagged as part of their regular sexual activity. The term of five years' imprisonment was reduced to three and a half years because of the terrifying threats made by a man determined to dominate and control the defendant's life. The threats created a genuine fear for the safety of herself and more significantly, her daughter, and this caused the defendant to lose control and make the ferocious attack.

In HM's AG for Jersey v Holley (2005) 3 AER 371, the Privy Council regarded the Court of Appeal precedent in Smith as wrongly decided, interpreting the Act as setting a purely objective standard. Thus, although the accused's characteristics were to be taken into account when assessing the gravity of the provocation, the standard of self-control to be expected was invariable except for the accused's age and sex. The defendant and the deceased were both chronic alcoholics and had a violent and abusive relationship. The evidence was that the deceased was drunk and taunted him by telling him that she had sex with another man. The defendant then struck the deceased with an axe which was an accident of availability. Psychiatric evidence was that his consumption of alcohol was involuntary and that he had a number of other psychiatric conditions which, independently of the effects of the alcohol, might have caused the loss of self-control and induced him to kill. Lord Nicholls said:

Whether the provocative acts or words and the defendant's response met the 'ordinary person' standard prescribed by the statute is the question the jury must consider, not the altogether looser question of whether, having regard to all the circumstances, the jury consider the loss of self-control was sufficient excusable. The statute does not leave each jury free to set whatever standard they consider appropriate in the circumstances by which to judge whether the defendant's conduct is "excusable".

Since the passage of the Coroners and Justice Act 2009, the defence of provocation—used in a number of the aforementioned cases—has been replaced with "loss of control".

The Law Commission Report on Partial Defences to Murder (2004) rejects the notion of creating a mitigatory defence to cover the use of excessive force in self-defence but accepts that the "all or nothing" effect of self-defence can produce unsatisfactory results in the case of murder.

A 2001 study reported that the use of the provocation defense was rising in cases of battered woman.

=== Australia ===
In Australia, self-defence might be considered the most appropriate defence to a charge of murder for a woman who kills to protect her life or the lives of her children in a domestic violence context. It is about the rational act of a person who kills in order to save her (or his) own life. But the lack of success in raising self-defence in Australia for battered women has meant that provocation has been the main focus of the courts. In 2005, based on the Victorian Law Reform Commission's Defences to Homicide: Final Report, the Victorian government announced changes to the homicide laws in that jurisdiction, which are intended to address this perceived imbalance. Under the new laws, victims of family violence will be able to put evidence of their abuse before the court as part of their defence, and argue self-defence even in the absence of an immediate threat, and where the response of killing involved greater force than the threatened harm.

=== Canada ===
In 1911 in Sault Ste. Marie, Angelina Napolitano, a 28-year-old pregnant immigrant, killed her husband Pietro with an axe after he tried to force her into prostitution. She confessed and was sentenced to execution after a brief trial, but during the delay before the sentence was carried out (a delay necessary to allow her to give birth to her child), a public campaign for her release began. Napolitano's supporters argued that the judge in the case had been wrong to throw out evidence of her long-standing abuse at Pietro's hands (including an incident five months before when he stabbed her nine times with a pocket knife). The federal cabinet eventually commuted her sentence to life imprisonment. She was the first woman in Canada to use the battered woman defense on a murder charge.

The Supreme Court of Canada set a precedent for the use of the battered women defence in the 1990 case of R. v. Lavallee.

=== New Zealand ===
In R v Fate (1998) 16 CRNZ 88, a woman who had come to New Zealand from the small island of Nanumea, which is part of the Tuvalu Islands, received a two-year sentence for manslaughter by provocation. Mrs. Fate spoke no English and was isolated within a small close-knit Wellington community of 12 families, so she felt trapped in the abusive relationship.

Similarly, The Queen v Epifania Suluape (2002) NZCA 6 deals with a wife who pleaded provocation after she killed her husband with an axe when he proposed to leave her for another woman. There was some evidence of neglect, humiliation, and abuse but the court concluded that this was exaggerated. On appeal, the court was very conscious of the Samoan culture in New Zealand in restricting the power of the wife to act independently of her husband and reduced her sentence for manslaughter to five years.

A report of the New Zealand Law Commission examines not only violence by men against women, but also violence by women against men and in same-sex relationships.

The partial defense of provocation that converted what would otherwise be murder into manslaughter was abolished in 2009 in New Zealand, because the historical reason for its existence (mandatory life sentence for murder) no longer exists. However, the provocative behavior of the victim can be taken into account in deciding the length of a murder sentence.

=== United States ===
In 1994, as part of the Violence Against Women Act, the United States Congress ordered an investigation into the role of battered woman syndrome expert testimony in the courts to determine its validity and usefulness. In 1997, they published the report of their investigation, titled The Validity and Use of Evidence Concerning Battering and Its Effects in Criminal Trials. "The federal report ultimately rejected all terminology related to the battered woman syndrome... noting that these terms were 'no longer useful or appropriate'" (Rothenberg, "Social Change", 782). Instead of using the term "battered woman", the terminology "battering and its effects" became acceptable. The decision to change this terminology was based on a changing body of research indicating there is more than one pattern to battering and a more inclusive definition more accurately represented the realities of domestic violence.

Weiand v. State was a landmark Florida Supreme Court case that took place in March 1999. In this historic case, the state's Supreme Court granted Florida citizens the ability to rely upon battered spouse syndrome as a defense in killing their abuser. While the decision is effective for anyone who is in an abusive situation, the majority of people that would take advantage of this defense were women since they are generally abused more than men. In one notable instance of an attempted defense using BWS, Florida resident Kathleen Weiand shot and killed her husband Todd Weiand. She used the battered woman syndrome in her defense and the defense expert agreed that she was suffering from the syndrome. However, the jury rejected her defense and Kathleen was sentenced to 18 years in prison for second degree murder. Kathleen appealed, eventually reaching Florida's Supreme Court who regarded her case as high priority. Ultimately, the Court overturned the ruling, in favor of Kathleen Weiand.

== See also ==
- Domestic violence
- Domestic violence against men
- Outline of domestic violence
- Violence against women
- Violence against men
- Complex posttraumatic stress disorder (C-PTSD)
- Battered-child syndrome
