= John school =

Educational intervention aimed at clients of prostitutes

John school is a form of educational intervention that caters to the clients of prostitutes, who are colloquially known as "johns" in North America. Societal norms deemed the behavior of clients and their engagement in sex work as atypical, so john schools work to address this. John schools originated in San Francisco due to community frustrations about the great occurrence of street prostitution in their areas and the lack of effective policies to combat the sex industry. Schools similar to the San Francisco one were established throughout the country and in multiple nations. John schools are usually a diversion program for people – almost exclusively men – arrested for soliciting the services of a prostitute, or another related offense. This often acts as an alternative to criminal prosecutions. However, in some jurisdictions, courts may sentence men to attend a john school program as a condition of probation. John schools often last a few months and usually have weekly sessions. Their focus is often on the experiences and harms of prostitution, such as the violence associated with prostitution, the sexually transmitted disease risks of prostitution, and the effects of prostitution on families and communities. Whether the john school is a diversion program or a sentencing condition, the client will often pay a fee to enroll. The fee frequently covers the cost of the program and sometimes contributes to programs to aid prostitutes, or community projects within red light districts. Generally speaking, there is no definitive evidence demonstrating whether or not john schools have been able to reduce the number of people who hire prostitutes.

== History ==
=== Origin ===
Before the origin of john schools, officials were mainly concerned with finding and arresting sex workers themselves. This strategy was inefficient in diminishing the occurrence of prostitution, as when workers would get arrested, they would often have to pay a fine which would force them to turn to prostitution to pay for it. A conviction would also appear on their record which would make it difficult to find work outside of the sex trade, forcing them to resort back to it for a living. Officials realized their practices were largely ineffective, and decided to focus on targeting the buyers of sex work. By decreasing the demand of the sex trade, sex workers would be left with no business and forced to turn to something else for work. One of the steps in this new plan was the creation of john schools. By educating buyers about the dangers and harms of prostitution, they would turn away from engaging in the trade. Officials believed these buyers, also known as johns, would be very receptive to the education as they were normal people and not the typical criminal.

An additional cause for the creation of john schools was community concerns about the influx and visibility of street prostitution in their areas. The presence of the sex trade led to increased drugs and violence, more traffic and trash, such as used condoms, needles, and alcoholic bottles, littering the streets. Communities complained that prostitution was harming the business of local companies and the quality of life of residents of the area. With families making up a large proportion of residents in these areas, one of the biggest concerns heard was that they had to raise their children around so much crime and violence. With sights of pimps beating prostitutes and people engaging in oral sex out in plain sight during all hours of the day, parents urged the police to clean up the streets. In response, police increased the number of officers in these communities and prohibited offenders of sex-related crimes from being presented in prostitution-filled areas. These actions did little to improve these areas, so john schools were created as an alternative.

=== First Offender Prostitution Program (FOPP) ===
The first comprehensive john school program was started in San Francisco in 1995 by the San Francisco District Attorney's Office and Norma Hotaling and was known as the First Offender Prostitution Program. The San Francisco District Attorney's Office collaborated with the San Francisco Police Department and the non-profit, Standing Against Global Exploitation in the creation of the FOPP. These organizations shared the beliefs that the practices of the sex trade were harmful to society and that the policies put in place to address and fight the crime of prostitution were ineffective.

The First Offender Prostitution Program featured a curriculum that was divided into six sections: "Prostitution Law and Street Facts, Health Education, Effect of Prostitution on Prostitutes, Dynamics of Pimping, Recruiting, and Trafficking, Effect of Prostitution on the Community and Sexual Addiction". The program met once a week for sessions for up to ten sessions. Participants of FOPP were required to pay a fee to enroll which partially went to the running of the school and partially went to nearby programs that assisted survivors of sex work.

== Prevalence ==
John schools have been established across the United States, in Canada, South Korea and in the United Kingdom. More than 15 john schools have emerged in the United Kingdom since the first British john school in Leeds which was led by Julie Bindel and opened in 1998. As the term 'john' is rarely used in the United Kingdom, john schools are referred to by several different names including kerb-crawling rehabilitation schemes or kerb-crawling awareness schemes. The proceeds from a john school in Toronto, Ontario, Canada finance an eight-week life skills-based course for prostitutes run through Streetlight Support Services.

In the US, as of 2012 around 58 John Schools had been established in cities dealing with problems of high rates of prostitution. The earliest cities to have followed the footsteps of San Francisco were Grand Rapids, Michigan; Minneapolis, Minnesota; Rochester, New York; and West Palm Beach, Florida. These newly established schools modeled their curriculum after the First Offender Prostitution Program of San Francisco, simplifying altering parts to fit their specific locations such as the specific laws and policies taught to participants.

John schools all had the same objective of fighting prostitution by educating buyers but their layouts slightly differed from each other. Some schools acted as diversion programs, dismissing the criminal charges of participants upon completion, while others were assigned to arrested buyers as part of their sentencing. Programs also varied in the number of sessions required for completion and how often sessions were as some schools met weekly or monthly or bi-monthly. Fee requirements for schools ranged from about $0 to $1,500. Some schools had larger fees in order to allocate a portion of the money to programs that helped sex workers get out of the trade, while others simply collected enough money in fees to simply run their program.

== Curriculum ==
First time male offenders who volunteer for the program are required to attend an eight-hour seminar on the negative consequences of prostitution of all types on neighborhoods, the Criminal Justice System, and the prostitutes themselves, and face the possibility of a jail sentence if they refuse. In the first 12 years of the still ongoing program, now called the First Offender Prostitution Program, the recidivism rate amongst offenders was reduced from 8% to less than 5%. Between 1981 and 2007, 48 john schools had opened in the United States.

Negative societal views on prostitution labeled those engaged in the trade as "problematic behaviour". The purchasing of sexual services was seen as abnormal, as typically love and sex went hand in hand. The experience of mental disorders was used by society as an explanation for the unusual behaviors of buyers of sex work. John schools often brought in psychologists to discuss mental health and former sex addicts to share their struggles and journeys with participants,

One of the objectives of john schools was to clean up the streets, mainly focusing on reducing the occurrence of visible acts of sex work. Schools had sessions on the negative impact street prostitution had on communities and their members. There was little attention given to more private forms of sex work, such as brothels, escorts, pornography, and massage parlors. These practices took place in hidden areas that were out of sight of the public making them not a concern for the community.

John schools wanted to educate buyers of the realities of the sex trade and get rid of their ignorance and denial of the harms. One lesson taught was that sex workers were victims as they did not choose this work but instead were being forced into it. Former sex workers were invited to sessions to speak to participants about their negative experiences in the industry. Buyers were convinced to believe that by purchasing sex, they were contributing to the "abusive and exploitative cycle that sex workers endure". In sessions, schools depicted pimps as violent criminals that often beat up and robbed buyers. Sex workers were described as dangerous and deceitful as they did not actually care or have feelings for their clients. John schools claimed that sex workers only fake their affection and likeness for clients in order to get their money.

== Evaluations of john schools ==
A 2009 audit of the first john school in San Francisco conducted as part of the city's budget analysis faulted the program due to its ill-defined goals and lack of ways to determine its effectiveness. Despite being touted as a national model that would come at no cost to taxpayers, the audit stated that the program did not cover its expenses in each of the previous five years, leading to a $270,000 shortfall.

Some critics question how john school curricula socially construct sex work, while others do note the influence of contradictory perspectives of both sex work advocates and critics. For example, an academic policy evaluation of the First Offender Prostitution Program in San Francisco found that the program "both replicates and contests competing and often contradictory gender ideologies and patterns of power. Specifically, the program’s enrollment practices and most of its content imply that men who purchase sexual services are rational sexual agents, while women who sell these services are (mainly) victims. ... The program thus illustrates the contested and contradictory ideological dynamics of gender-sensitive institutional reforms."

There is no clear evidence whether the establishment of john school programs has led to a decline in re-arrest rates of offenders of prostitution-related crimes. In an analysis of the First Offender Prostitution Program, it was found that shortly after the program was introduced re-arrest rates declined in San Francisco but so did rate in the entirety of California. Seven years after the program was implemented, re-arrest rates seemed to increase in San Francisco, while rates in the rest of the state decreased. Other studies conducted have found that john schools have reduced rates in areas implemented. However, experts have labeled these results as inconclusive, and stated that they do not prove the effectiveness of such schools, as first-offenders could have simply relocated to other areas to engage in prostitution or begun to use more private forms of sex work instead.

Psychologist David Ley claims that john schools rely on ideas such as sex addiction, despite the fact that this is a "debunked treatment model, with mounds of modern evidence showing that it has more to do with moral and religious conflicts over sex, than the sex itself", and that "there remains no empirical evidence" that such treatment works. While john schools teach that "men purchase sex either because of unhealthy attitudes about being men, or because of sexual addiction, or because they simply don’t know how to have healthy relationships", a research paper published in 2013 which examined men who pay for sex found "no evidence of a peculiar quality that differentiates customers in general from men who have not paid for sex". Ley argues that while "they may hold some value as a social or criminal intervention, the 'treatment' component of these programs ultimately rests on a flawed (or at least decidedly unproven) core assumption, that there must be something 'wrong' or diseased, in men who try to buy sex and that public treatment intervention will alter that man’s future sexual behaviors."

== Footnotes ==
- "Prostitution: From Wolfenden to John Schools".. Research on john schools in North America and the UK by Ian R. Cook (Northumbria University)
- "Final Report on the Evaluation of the First Offender Prostitution Program: Report Summary" by Michael Shively, Sarah Kuck Jalbert, Ryan Kling, William Rhodes, Peter Finn, Chris Flygare, Laura Tierney, Dana Hunt, David Squires, Christina Dyous, Kristin Wheeler. National Institute of Justice, U.S. Department of Justice, Washington, D.C.
- "Recidivism Among the Customers of Female Street Prostitutes: Do Intervention Programs Help?" by Martin A. Monto and Steve Garcia. Western Criminology Review 3(2), June 2002.
- *Reports on School for Johns". BAYSWAN (website). Index of reports critical of john school programs.
- "John school takes a bite out of prostitution" by Justin Berton. San Francisco Chronicle, April 14, 2008.
