= Julie Bindel =

English radical feminist writer (born 1962)

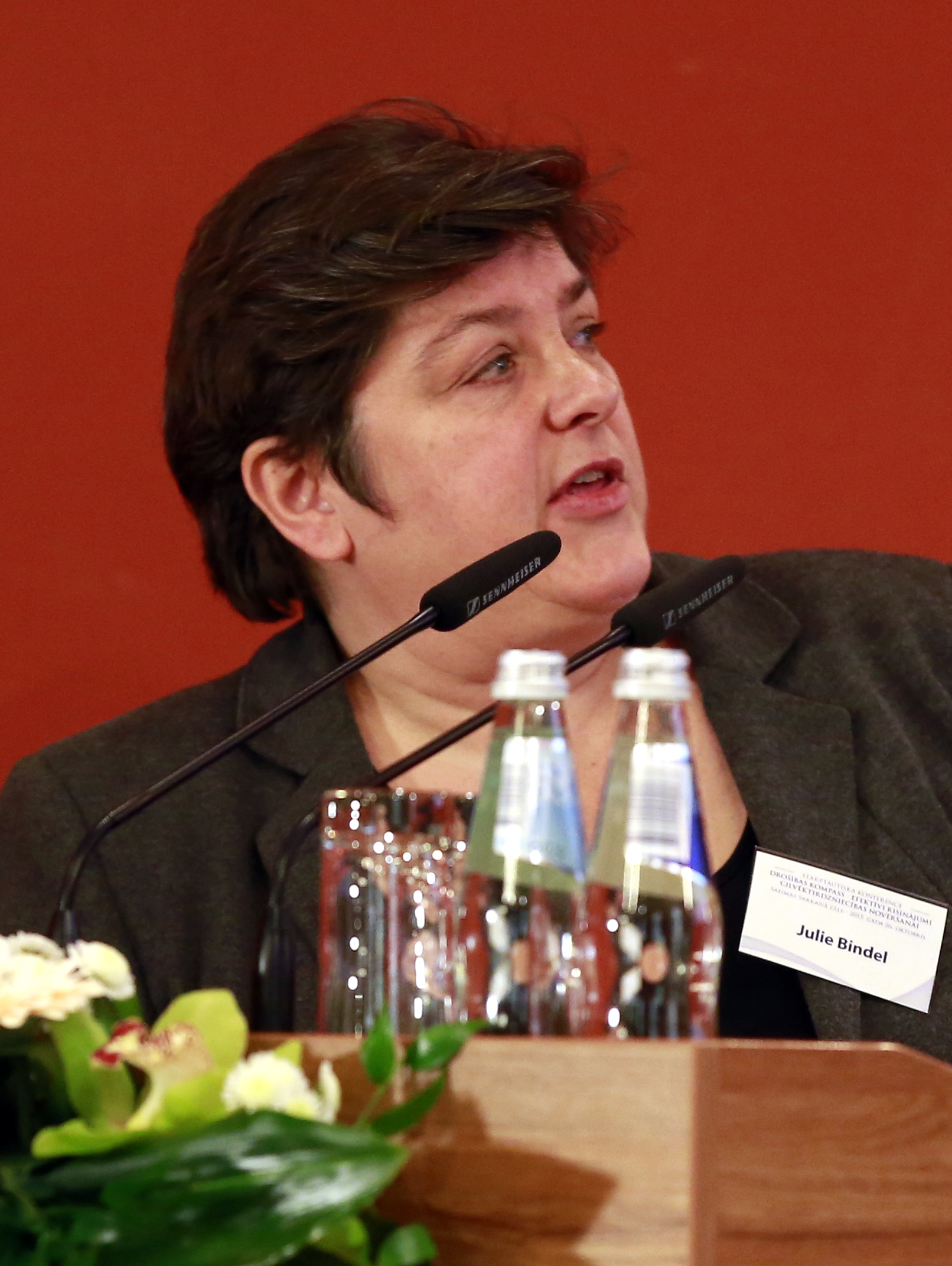
- Bindel in 2015
- Born: 20 July 1962 (age 64); Darlington, County Durham, England
- Occupations: Journalist, writer, cultural critic
- Organization: Co-founder of Justice for Women
- Known for: Law reform, advocacy journalism
- Movement: Radical feminism, lesbian feminism
- Partner: Harriet Wistrich

Julie Bindel (born 20 July 1962) is an English radical feminist writer. She co-founded Justice for Women, which helps women who have been prosecuted for assaulting or killing violent male partners.

A former visiting researcher at the University of Lincoln (2014–2017), and former assistant director of the Research Centre on Violence, Abuse and Gender Relations at Leeds Metropolitan University, much of Bindel's work concerns male violence against women and children, particularly with regard to prostitution, stalking, religious fundamentalism, and human trafficking.

Bindel has written or co-written over 30 book chapters and five books, including Straight Expectations (2014) and The Pimping of Prostitution (2017). She is also the editor, with her partner Harriet Wistrich, of The Map of My Life: The Story of Emma Humphreys (2003). She has written regularly for The Guardian, the New Statesman, The Spectator, The Sunday Telegraph magazine, and Standpoint.

== Early life ==
Bindel and her two brothers (one older, one younger) grew up on a council estate in Darlington, north east England, after moving there from a terraced house that had coal fires and no indoor toilet. She is of mixed Catholic and Jewish heritage. She attended Branksome Comprehensive School from 1973 to 1978, leaving a year early without anyone noticing, she wrote. She came out as a lesbian in 1977 when she was 15. While growing up, Bindel wrote in 2009, the thought of heterosexual conformity was totally unappealing.

=== Police, women and murderers at large ===
When she was 17, Bindel moved to Leeds and joined the Leeds Revolutionary Feminist Group, which was campaigning against pornography. Peter Sutcliffe, the Yorkshire Ripper, was still at large; mainly in the Leeds and Bradford area from 1975 to 1980, he is known to have murdered 13 women, some working as prostitutes, and attacked seven more, leaving them for dead. It was Bindel's anger about the Sutcliffe murders that drove her to campaign to end sexual violence against women. She wrote in 2005 that the police investigation only became focused when the first "non-prostitute" was murdered. She was also angered by the police's assertions that prostitutes were the killer's target, although from May 1978 none of the victims had fitted that profile, and by police advice that women stay indoors.

Bindel describes being followed home one night in November 1980 by a man of medium height with a dark beard and wiry hair. She ran into a pub to escape from him and reported what had happened to the police, who either asked her to complete a photofit or dismissed her account because her pursuer had a Yorkshire accent. One officer, because her accent resembled the north-eastern man, later found to be a hoaxer, made light of Bindel's evidence by claiming she "was just trying to cover up for my dad". The following day or following week the body of Sutcliffe's final victim, a 20-year-old student, Jacqueline Hill, was found less than 1/2 mile (800 metres) from where the man had followed Bindel. When Sutcliffe's photograph was published after his arrest the following year, Bindel realised the photofit she had assisted in compiling looked almost exactly like him as well as resembling the version provided by Marilyn Moore, one of Sutcliffe's victims who survived.

Bindel took part in feminist protests against the killings, including flyposting fake police posters in Leeds advising men to stay off the streets:

Attention all men in West Yorkshire, ... there is a serial killer on the loose in the area. Out of consideration for the safety of women, please ensure you are indoors by 8pm each evening, so that women can go about their business without the fear you may provoke.

During late 2006 when the perpetrator of the Ipswich serial murders was still active, Bindel again found the police were advising women to "stay off the streets. If you are out alone at night, you are putting yourself in danger".

== Research and activism ==
=== Academic positions ===
Bindel has served as the assistant director of the Research Centre on Violence, Abuse and Gender Relations at Leeds Metropolitan University (1990s), researcher at the Child and Woman Abuse Studies Unit at London Metropolitan University (2000s), Visiting Journalist at Brunel University London (2013–2014), and Visiting Researcher at the University of Lincoln (2014–2017).

=== Justice for Women ===
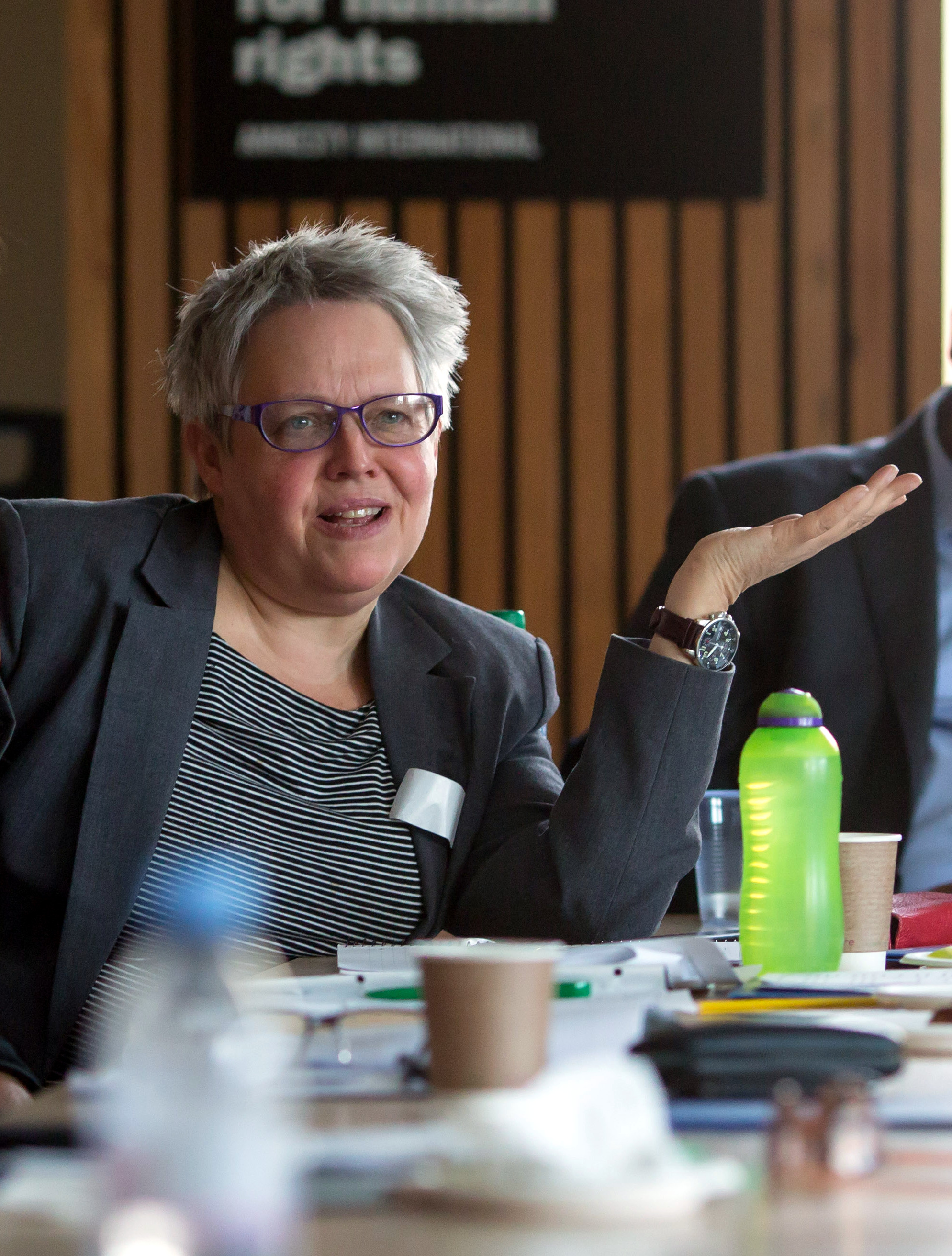
Harriet Wistrich, co-founder of Justice for Women

Bindel's research into violence against women in domestic and personal relationships has been a central feature of her work. Together with her partner, Harriet Wistrich, a solicitor, and Hilary McCollum, Bindel co-founded Justice for Women (JFW), a feminist law-reform group that campaigns against laws that discriminate against women in cases involving male violence against partners. E. Jane Dickson wrote in The Independent in 1995 that the group was being run by Bindel, Wistrich and their dog, Peggy, out of their North London home; Peggy did "her bit for the cause by snarling like Cerberus at the approach of a male footfall".

JFW was created in 1991, initially as the Free Sara Thornton campaign, to secure the release of Sara Thornton, who had been convicted the previous year of murdering her violent husband. JFW was launched in solidarity with Southall Black Sisters, who were campaigning for the release of Kiranjit Ahluwalia, convicted in 1989 of murdering her husband.

One of JFW's earliest cases was that of Emma Humphreys. Humphreys had been convicted of murder after killing her violent pimp boyfriend in 1985 when she was 17. In September 1992, she wrote to JFW from prison asking for help. With their support she successfully appealed the conviction, claiming long-term provocation, a significant decision at the time. News reports from 7 July 1995 show Humphreys, Bindel and Wistrich holding hands on the steps of the Old Bailey after the judges ordered that Humphreys be released.

External videos
- Humphreys, Bindel and Wistrich, outside the Old Bailey, 7 July 1995 (YouTube video, directed by Pratibha Parmar)

Humphreys died three years later of a drug overdose. Bindel, Wistrich and Humphreys had become friends, and it was Bindel and Wistrich who found her dead in bed at her home. They co-edited a book based on her notes about her life, The Map of My Life: The Story of Emma Humphreys (2003). They also award the annual Emma Humphreys Memorial Prize to women and groups that raise awareness about violence against women and children.

In 2008, an issue Bindel had campaigned on for over a decade became the focus of government legislation. JFW and Southall Black Sisters had sought to change a law that protected men and penalised women. If men murdered a partner in the heat of the moment, an appeal to provocation was admissible in mitigation. Such an appeal was not practical for women trapped in violent relationships, because murders carried out in the context of ongoing subjection to violence tended not to occur in the heat of the moment, but would often be calculated to provide an escape from violence. The campaign to change the law sought to resist the mitigation that men could appeal to when partners were murdered, and allow the sustained violence to which women could be subjected to act as a mitigating factor. Harriet Harman, Minister for Women and Equality, was of a similar mind on this issue, and legislation was proposed that would change the law to this effect.

=== Prostitution ===
Bindel has been researching and campaigning against prostitution since the 1970s and has written regularly about it since 1998. While working at Leeds Metropolitan University in the 1990s, she coordinated the Kerb Crawlers Re-education Programme, a John school in the city. An abolitionist, she argues strongly against efforts to decriminalise the sex trade as part of promoting sex workers' rights. Her position is that it is "inherently abusive, and a cause and a consequence of women's inequality ... a one-sided exploitative exchange rooted in male power". For her book The Pimping of Prostitution: Abolishing the Sex Work Myth (2017), she interviewed 250 people in nearly 40 countries, visited brothels, and spoke to prostitutes, pimps and the police.

She has been commissioned several times to write reports about the sex trade for charities and local authorities. While working for the Child and Woman Abuse Studies Unit at London Metropolitan University, she co-authored a report in 2003 on prostitution in Australia, Ireland, the Netherlands, and Sweden. In 2004, she produced a report for Glasgow City Council on lap dancing in the UK. In 2008, she co-wrote (with Helen Atkins) Big Brothel, a report commissioned by the POPPY Project, which examined 921 brothels in London's 33 boroughs. They wrote that 85 percent of the brothels were in residential areas—nearly two-thirds in apartments and one-fifth in houses: "Wherever you are in the city, the likelihood is that buying and selling women is going on under your nose."

Bindel and Atkins recruited male acquaintances to telephone the brothels for them, asking what was on offer. They telephoned only the ones advertised in local newspapers; Bindel estimated that the brothels made £86M to £209.5M a year from the services thus advertised. Penetrative sex was available from £15 to £250, with an average price of £62, and two percent of the brothels offered unprotected penetrative sex for an extra £10 to £200. Many of the women were from Southern or Eastern Europe and Asia. One brothel offered what they said was "a Greek girl who is very, very young". Bindel wrote about the findings in her Guardian column:

When Frank rang a brothel in Enfield, he could hear a baby crying in the background. When Alan called one in Southwark, he could make out the sound of a child asking for his tea. And when Mick called another to inquire about their services, he was told that he could have a "dirty Oriental bitch who will do stag nights, anal, and the rest."

The Big Brothel report was criticised by 27 academics and other researchers involved in research into prostitution, who complained that the study had been conducted without ethical approval or acknowledgement of existing sources, and had been co-written by a researcher with anti-prostitution views. The POPPY Project responded that the report was one they had produced independently, that they were not an academic institution, and that it was important to provide a counterbalance to the positive focus on the sex industry found in the media.

== Opinion journalism and interviews ==
=== Overview ===
Bindel writes for The Guardian, The Sunday Telegraph magazine, the New Statesman, Truthdig and Standpoint, and is often interviewed by the BBC and Sky News. She began writing for newspapers in November 1998, while she was working at Leeds Metropolitan University, when The Independent published her article about the Leeds Kerb Crawlers Re-education Programme.

In 2001, she was given an occasional column in The Guardian, with more frequent contributions from 2003, after she wrote a longer piece about female sex tourism in Jamaica. Topics have included child abuse, cyberstalking, the failure to prosecute sex offenders and the consequences of that failure, and biological theories about what drives sex offenders. She has also covered gender-neutral toilets, "Why I hate vegetarians", Barbie and Ken—"a 1950s pre-feminist monstrosity, resplendent in her passivity" and "a drippy, pathetic man who appeared to have no penis"—and Arsenal football club—"I went to bed with a smile on my face. Why? The most arrogant team in England was given its comeuppance."

=== Rape ===
Bindel is critical of the difficulties endured by many women who report rape. She argues that the investigative and legal process treats women more as offenders than victims, and that people think it is more important to safeguard the rights of men who might be accused maliciously. Her writings on rape have appeared in newspapers in Kuwait and India. She wrote in 2006 that she would not report rape herself: "We may as well forget about the criminal justice system and train groups of vigilantes to exact revenge and, hopefully, deter attacks. Because if I were raped, I would rather take my chances as a defendant in court, than as a complainant in a system that seems bent on proving that rape is a figment of malicious women's imagination."

=== Lesbianism, marriage ===
Bindel refers to herself as a political lesbian feminist. In 2010, she entered The Independent's "Pink List" as no. 98 of the top 101 most influential gay and lesbian people in Britain. She began writing about lesbian issues in 1996. Her work for The Guardian has included articles about lesbian chic, lesbian child-bearing, the cosmetics industry, cosmetic surgery for women, and scientific theories about sexuality. In January 2009, she wrote about the radical lesbian feminism of the 1970s and 1980s, and her desire to return to those values. Her lesbianism is "intrinsically bound up" with her feminism and campaigning to oppose sexual violence. She described her horror when she was younger at the idea of settling down with a local boy:

I was ... struck by the drudgery on display. While men were out drinking, embarking on fishing trips and generally enjoying their freedom, women were stuck cooking for them, cleaning for them, and running around after children. For women, heterosexuality seemed a total con.

She concluded the article with an invitation to heterosexual women: "Come on sisters, you know it makes sense. Stop pretending you think lesbianism is an exclusive members' club, and join the ranks. I promise that you will not regret it." Bindel does not support the idea of marriage, which she calls a "patriarchal and outdated tradition" stemming from a time that women were viewed as the property of their fathers, then of their husbands. The taking of a husband's name she calls "branding". She extends the same criticism to same-sex marriage; marriage should be rejected, not reclaimed. "Dress it up, subvert it, deny it all you want," she said in 2016. "Marriage is an institution that has curtailed women's freedom for centuries ... It can never be a feminist act." She argues that the state should instead regulate civil partnerships for same-sex and opposite-sex couples.

Bindel is the co-founder, with Kathleen Stock, of the Lesbian Project, which describes itself as "an organisation dedicated to representing the rights and interests of lesbians in the UK".

=== Feminism ===
A critic of identity politics and what she calls "the emergence of feminist preciousness", Bindel argued in 2014 that call-out culture had replaced political activism. She cited, as successful feminist campaigns, Justice for Women's work to change the law so that "nagging" was no longer a defence for husbands who killed their wives, and the efforts devoted to outlawing marital rape. Instead of fighting these institutional battles, feminists were focusing now on shaming individuals. "Petitions have taken over politics," she wrote. She is critical of the practice of no-platforming, arguing that "censorship is the new normal". For instance, in 2016 she said that banning Roosh V from entering the UK (who had said that if rape were legalised, women would be "more careful" with their bodies) would not change the fact that every year in England and Wales around 400,000 women are sexually assaulted. (Note: Ministry of Justice, Home Office and the Office for National Statistics (2013): "Based on aggregated data from the 'Crime Survey for England and Wales' in 2009/10, 2010/11 and 2011/12, on average, 2.5 per cent of females and 0.4 per cent of males said that they had been a victim of a sexual offence (including attempts) in the previous 12 months. This represents around 473,000 adults being victims of sexual offences (around 404,000 females and 72,000 males) on average per year. These experiences span the full spectrum of sexual offences, ranging from the most serious offences of rape and sexual assault, to other sexual offences like indecent exposure and unwanted touching.") She believes that no-platforming merely leaves people uninformed about other people's views.

=== Gender and trans people ===
Bindel argues that gender is a product of socialisation, and that gender roles reinforce women's oppression. She would like to see an end to gender entirely. She wrote in 2008 that gender-reassignment surgery reinforces gender stereotypes, and that the diagnosis of gender identity disorder is built upon outdated views about how females and males should behave. "It is precisely this idea that certain distinct behaviours are appropriate for males and females," she wrote, "that underlies feminist criticism of the phenomenon of 'transgenderism.'"

A 2004 column by Bindel titled "Gender Benders, beware" printed in The Guardian caused the paper to receive more than two hundred letters of complaint from transgender people, doctors, therapists, academics and others. The column expressed her anger about Kimberly Nixon – a transgender woman who was expelled from her training as a rape crisis counsellor on the basis that she was trans – and also included Bindel's views about transgender people and transgender rights, which drew significant criticism. Trans rights advocacy group Press for Change cited this article as an example of "discriminatory writing" about transgender people in the press. Complaints focused on the column's title, the cartoon accompanying the piece (which depicted a hairy, tattooed person wearing a dress with a pin reading "I'm a lady"), and the disparaging tone, such as "Think about a world inhabited just by transgender people. It would look like the set of Grease" and "I don't have a problem with men disposing of their genitals, but it does not make them women, in the same way that shoving a bit of vacuum hose down your 501s [jeans] does not make you a man." Bindel later apologized for the article's "offensive" tone, but denied accusations of transphobia and claimed that her critics were using her as a scapegoat.

In a 2010 opinion piece in The Guardian, C. L. Minou asserted that Julie Bindel had a "long record of public transphobia". When Bindel was nominated in 2008 for Stonewall's "Journalist of the year" award, transgender activists picketed the ceremony. The London Feminist Network staged a counter-demonstration in Bindel's support. Because of her views, she has been no-platformed by several student unions, including that of the University of Manchester in 2015, where she had been invited to discuss the topic "From liberation to censorship: does modern feminism have a problem with free speech?".

In July 2020, Bindel sued PinkNews and its editor Benjamin Cohen for libel in relation to an article concerning gender-critical feminism that she argued defamed her. In October 2021, the case was settled out of court with PinkNews publishing a joint statement with Bindel stating "The [original] article made a number of serious allegations of misconduct and PinkNews accepts that if the allegations were understood to refer to Julie, they would be wholly untrue."

=== Bisexuality ===
In 2012, Bindel condemned female bisexuality as a "fashionable trend" caused by "sexual hedonism", and broached the question of whether bisexuality even exists: "[B]isexuality is sold to heterosexual women as some type of recreational activity far from their 'natural home' of straight sex. It is seen as 'temporary lesbianism'"—having a girlfriend, for a straight woman, is like having "the latest Prada handbag". A long-active lesbian feminist, she expressed discomfort with the inclusion of sexuality- and gender-variant communities into the expanding LGBT "rainbow alliance": "The mantra now at 'gay' meetings is a tongue-twisting LGBTQQI. It is all a bit of an unholy alliance. We have been put in a room together and told to play nicely."

=== Men and heterosexuality ===
In a 2015 interview with Radfem Collective, Bindel – in what she later said was a joke – advocated for the internment of all males, as well as the abolition of heterosexuality. When asked about whether or not heterosexuality will survive women's liberation, she said:

It won't, not unless men get their act together, have their power taken from them and behave themselves. I mean, I would actually put them all in some kind of camp where they can all drive around in quad bikes, or bicycles, or white vans. I would give them a choice of vehicles to drive around with, give them no porn, they wouldn't be able to fight – we would have wardens, of course! Women who want to see their sons or male loved ones would be able to go and visit, or take them out like a library book, and then bring them back. I hope heterosexuality doesn't survive, actually. I would like to see a truce on heterosexuality. I would like an amnesty on heterosexuality until we have sorted ourselves out. Because under patriarchy it's shit.

She later said this was satire and that she has nothing against those who choose heterosexual relationships, men, or their sexuality, stating everyone is an individual and criticising the idea that men are "born rapists".

In a 2025 opinion piece for the Telegraph, Bindel nevertheless argued that because of the risk of sex abuse, transgender women as well as cisgender men should be forbidden from working with young children.

=== Aspley Library ===
In June 2022, a talk by Bindel at Aspley Library, Nottingham, was cancelled by Nottingham City Council. The talk took place outside the library instead. The council later apologised for their unlawful action & paid for losses incurred.

The council later released a statement:

"This was a private booking at Aspley Library by the 'Nottingham Women for Change' group and all ticket sales and marketing of the event had been undertaken independently with no input from the council.

"While it was known that the event was going to be from a feminist perspective, no information around the speaker's views on transgender rights was brought to the Library Service's attention.

"Once we became aware of this, we took the decision to cancel the booking. Nottingham is an inclusive city and as a council we support our LGBT community and have committed to supporting trans rights as human rights through Stonewall. We did not want the use of one of our library buildings for this event, taking place during Pride month, to be seen as implicit support for views held by the speaker which fly in the face of our position on transgender rights."

On 27 June, Bindel said that she would be talking to lawyers the next day about taking legal action against the council.

On 7 October 2022, Nottingham City Council issued an apology to Bindel:

"Nottingham City Council now accepts that its decision to cancel the event was procedurally unlawful. Nottingham City Council apologises to Ms Bindel and Nottingham Women for Change for cancelling the event in this way and for the inconvenience caused as a result of this decision."

Along with the apology, the council agreed to make a payment to Bindel, Nottingham Women for Change, and the ticket holders, and agreed to handle any future booking requests on a lawful basis.

== Personal life ==
Bindel identifies as a political lesbian.

== Publications ==
=== Books ===
- (2003). Bindel and Harriet Wistrich. The Map of My Life: The Story of Emma Humphreys, London: Astraia. ISBN 9780954634100
- (2014). Roger Matthews, Helen Easton, Lisa Young, and Bindel. Exiting Prostitution: A Study in Female Desistance. London: Palgrave Macmillan. ISBN 978-1-137-28940-7
- (2014). Bindel. Straight Expectations. London: Guardian. ISBN 1783560002 LCCN 2014-431281
- (2017). Bindel. The Pimping of Prostitution: Abolishing the Sex Work Myth. London: Palgrave Macmillan. ISBN 113755889X LCCN 2017-939330
- (2021). Bindel. Feminism for Women: The Real Route to Liberation. London: Constable & Robinson. ISBN 978-1-47213-260-4 LCCN 2020-479410

=== Reports, book chapters ===
- (1996), with Liz Kelly, et al. Domestic Violence Matters: An Evaluation of a Development Project Archived 26 February 2021 at the Wayback Machine. London: Home Office.
- (1996). "Women Overcoming Violence and Abuse: Information Pack on Topics Covered at the International Conference on Violence, Abuse and Women's Citizenship", Bradford: University of Bradford, Research Unit on Violence, Abuse and Gender Relations. ISBN 978-1851431588
- (1996). "Neither an Ism nor a Chasm: Maintaining a Radical-Feminist Agenda in Broad-Based Coalitions" in Lynne Harne, Elaine Miller (eds.), All the Rage: Reasserting Radical Lesbian Feminism, London: Women's Press.
- (2003), with Liz Kelly. "A Critical Examination of Responses to Prostitution in Four Countries: Victoria, Australia; Ireland; the Netherlands; and Sweden", Child and Woman Abuse Studies Unit, London Metropolitan University.
- (2004). Profitable Exploits! Lap Dancing in the UK, London Metropolitan University,
- (2006). "Press for Change": A Guide for Journalists Reporting on the Prostitution and Trafficking of Women, Coalition Against Trafficking in Women.
- (2008), with Helen Atkins. Big Brothel: A Survey of the Off-street Sex Industry in London. London: The POPPY Project, Eaves Housing for Women
- (2009), with Melissa Farley and Jacqueline M. Golding. Men Who Buy Sex: Who They Buy and What They Know, Eaves Housing for Women (London) / Prostitution Research & Education (San Francisco). OCLC 602963873
