= Frank Gerbode =

Frank Gerbode may refer to:

- Frank Gerbode (surgeon) (1907–1984), American cardiovascular surgeon
- Frank A. Gerbode, psychiatrist and author
