= Melissa Farley =

American psychologist (born 1942)

- Born: 1942 (age 83–84)
- Education: University of Iowa (PhD); San Francisco State University (MS); Mills College (BA)
- Known for: Research on the effects of prostitution, sexual abuse, and violence against women
- Scientific career
- Fields: Psychology
- Workplaces: Prostitution Research and Education 1996–present Kaiser Foundation Research Institute (Oakland, CA), 1993–2000
- Thesis: Effect of consciousness-raising groups versus lectures about women on the personalities and career interests and homemaking interests of female students in nursing (1973)

Melissa Farley (born 1942) is an American clinical psychologist, researcher and radical feminist anti-pornography and anti-prostitution activist. Farley is best known for her studies of the effects of prostitution, trafficking and sexual violence. She is the founder and director of the San Francisco-based organization, Prostitution Research and Education.

== Career ==
Farley, a clinical psychologist for over 45 years, has consulted with agencies, governments, medical centers, advocates for women in prostitution and trafficked women. These groups include the United Nations, the California Medical Examining Board, the US State Department, the Center for World Indigenous Studies, the Minnesota Indian Women's Sexual Assault Coalition, Refuge House, Breaking Free, Veronica's Voice and the Cambodian Women's Crisis Center. Farley has been a faculty member of the Center for World Indigenous Studies and has taught seminars on research for social change at the CWIS in Yelapa, Mexico. Farley has 49 publications in the field of violence against women, most of which address prostitution, pornography and sex trafficking. Her research has been used by governments in South Africa, Canada, France, New Zealand, Ghana, Sweden, the United Kingdom and the United States to craft policy on prostitution and human trafficking. Farley's research on the trafficking and prostitution of Indian women is the source of a character, Vera in the acclaimed historical novel The Night Watchman.

=== Research ===
==== Women in prostitution ====
Since 1993, Farley has researched prostitution and trafficking in 14 countries. She has written many studies reporting high rates of violence and post-traumatic stress disorder among women employed in the sex trade.

In a 2004 paper summarizing prostitution research in nine countries (Canada, Colombia, Germany, Mexico, South Africa, Thailand, Turkey, the US and Zambia), Farley and others interviewed 854 people (782 cisgender women and girls, 44 transgender people and 28 cisgender men) currently active in prostitution or having recently left. The interviewees came from a variety of groups within the sex trade: street prostitutes, legal and illegal brothel workers and strip-club workers, with the prostitute populations interviewed varying by country. Based on interviews and questionnaires, the paper's authors reported high rates of violence and post-traumatic stress: 71% of the respondents had been physically assaulted while in prostitution, 63% had been raped, and 68% met the criteria for PTSD. Out of 785 respondents asked, 89% (699) stated they wanted to leave prostitution, but had no other means of making a living. According to Farley and her co-authors, their findings contradict what they call "common myths about prostitution: the assumption that street prostitution is the worst type of prostitution, that prostitution of men and boys is different from prostitution of women and girls, that most of those in prostitution freely consent to it, that most people are in prostitution because of drug addiction, that prostitution is qualitatively different from trafficking, and that legalizing or decriminalizing prostitution would decrease its harm."

In a 1998 paper on San Francisco street sex workers (one of the populations included in the nine-country study), Farley and co-author Howard Barkan reported a notable history of violence in the lives of those surveyed. In childhood, 57% of respondents reported sexual abuse and 49% reported other physical abuse. While in prostitution, 68% reported being raped, 82% reported being physically assaulted and 83% reported being threatened with a weapon. The incidence and severity of PTSD correlated with the amount of violence experienced by an individual, and 84% of the respondents reported a history of homelessness.

In September 2007, Farley published a book on prostitution and sex trafficking in Nevada. Farley wrote that although Nevada has legal brothels, 90% of the state's prostitution occurs in Las Vegas and Reno (in counties where prostitution is illegal) or outside legally designated brothels. She found Las Vegas in particular a major destination for sex traffickers. Although 81% of the 45 legal brothel workers Farley interviewed reported wanting to leave prostitution, many were physically unable to do so. According to Farley, she was threatened at gunpoint by a brothel owner during the interviews.

Farley's prostitution studies have been criticized by sociologist Ronald Weitzer for reported issues with methodology. Weitzer was critical of what he saw as a lack of transparency in the interviews, how responses were translated into statistical data, sampling bias in favor of marginalized sex workers (such as street workers), and the general application of Farley's studies to oppose any kind of sex work. Weitzer has also said that Farley's findings are heavily influenced by radical feminist ideology. A 2002 study by Chudakov et al. used Farley's PTSD tool to measure its rate in Israeli sex workers. Of the 55 women who agreed to be interviewed, 17% met the criteria for PTSD (compared to Farley's 68%). Additionally, the English Collective of Prostitutes, a campaigning group which supports the decriminalisation of prostitution, has described Farley's claims as "absurd and unsubstantiated". Farley has also been criticized for accepting significant funding from anti-trafficking organizations, and has acknowledged that 30% of funding for a research project of prostitution was provided by the United States Department of State Office to Monitor and Combat Trafficking in Persons. In response, Farley stated that such funding has not swayed her research, specifically its methods or conclusions.

In 2018, Farley conducted interviews and published a paper on how the #MeToo movement needs to include women in prostitution.

==== Men who buy sex ====
Farley has co-authored a series of studies of men who buy sex. According to a 2015 study published in the Journal of Interpersonal Violence, sex buyers share many similarities with sexually coercive men. The first of these studies, based on interviews with sex buyers ("johns") in Edinburgh and Chicago, was published in April and May 2008. The reports, based on structured interviews with over 100 self-selecting men in each city who responded to newspaper ads placed by the researchers, report a high rate of abusive, predatory and dehumanizing attitudes towards prostitutes (and women in general) on the part of buyers. According to the studies, many of the men described their behavior as addiction; a large percentage said that the possibility of public exposure or being listed on a sex offender registry would deter them from buying sex from prostitutes. A 2012 study of sex buyers in Cambodia by Farley and associates reported similar findings.

In response to the Scottish study, a paper authored by approximately 15 academics and sexual health experts was submitted to the Scottish Parliament rebuking the methods and conclusions of Farley's study. According to their rebuttal, "This research violates fundamental principles of human research ethics in that there is no evidence of any benefit to the population studied. Rather the purpose of the research appears to have been to vilify the population of men who were chosen to be interviewed". According to the paper, Farley's work was biased, ill-informed and unhelpful.

==== Other research ====
Farley has written or co-written several studies sponsored by Kaiser Foundation Research Institute on the long-term health effects of sexual abuse and trauma. Several report higher rates of dissociation and somatization in patients with a history of childhood sexual abuse than those without such a history, with symptom frequency reportedly greater in those with a higher number of perpetrators in their sexual-abuse history. One study reported higher rates of PTSD, emergency-room and medical visits, and prescriptions in patients with a history of sexual abuse than those without, and relatively high rates in people with unclear memories of abuse.

=== Prostitution Research and Education ===
Farley is the founder and director of Prostitution Research and Education, a San Francisco-based 501(c)(3) organization. The organization, sponsored by the San Francisco Women's Centers, conducts research on prostitution, pornography and trafficking and offers education and consultation to other researchers, survivors, the public and policymakers. Its goal is "to abolish the institution of prostitution while at the same time advocating for alternatives to trafficking and prostitution – including emotional and physical healthcare for women in prostitution."

== Activism ==
Farley favors the abolition of prostitution, believing that a prostitute is the weaker partner in a transaction (making prostitution inherently exploitative and traumatizing). She advocates the Swedish model, in which paying for sex, pimping and human trafficking are illegal and the sale of sex is decriminalized; social services should be funded to aid prostitutes in leaving their way of life. Farley opposes an across-the-board decriminalization of prostitution and sex workers' rights activists and groups (such as COYOTE) which advocate legalizing or decriminalizing prostitution and the purchase of sexual services. According to these activists, her research discredits and misrepresents women working in the sex industry.

An anti-pornography activist, in 1985 Farley led a National Rampage Against Penthouse with Nikki Craft. The Rampage was a campaign involving the public destruction of bookstore-owned copies of Penthouse and Hustler which were denounced as violent pornography. Farley was arrested 13 times in nine states for her actions. She also participated in a 1984 protest in Iowa as part of the group Women Rising in Resistance. In March 2007 she testified in hearings on Kink.com's purchase of the San Francisco Armory, comparing the company's images to those of prisoner abuse at Abu Ghraib. Farley is opposed to sadomasochism in general. Her essay, "Ten Lies about Sadomasochism", outlines her opposition to BDSM practices; in her opinion, such practices are abusive, harmful and anti-feminist. On April 29, 2009 Farley argued on the radio program Intelligence Squared U.S. in favor of the proposition, "It is wrong to pay for sex".

=== Controversy ===
On June 11, 2003, Labour MP for Wairarapa Georgina Beyer read portions of a letter from Farley's research assistant Colleen Winn in New Zealand's House of Representatives. In the letter, Winn said that Farley had fabricated and misrepresented data in elements of reports which Farley had prepared on prostitution in New Zealand. Among Winn's accusations was that Farley's alleged statement that she had evidence that women were entering prostitution at age nine was untrue; the studies she performed did not collect any data indicating this. According to Winn, Farley was operating her research projects without oversight from an ethics committee in New Zealand: "I have read and am aware of the ethics of psychologists working in New Zealand. I know these were not adhered to". Winn told Beyer orally that Farley had paid some of the interview subjects, saying that Farley had made false claims on New Zealand television about her findings. She wrote that Farley's study "was not ethical, and the impact has done harm to those women and men who took part in it. It is for that reason that I am writing to the psychologists [sic] board of registration in California to lay a formal complaint regarding Melissa. I also believe that Melissa has committed an act of intentional misrepresentation of fact". The California board did not respond to Winn's complaint.

In 2008, Farley published a critique of the Report of New Zealand Prostitution Law Review Committee on her website, leading to Dr. Calum Bennachie, PhD, also filing a formal complaint with the American Psychological Association (APA) to remove her from its membership. In the course of her critique, Farley had revealed information indicating that she may have breached ethical guidelines of both the APA as well as the New Zealand Psychological Society (NZPsS), and Dr. Bennachie also pointed out several examples of "errors of fact that appear to be deliberately designed to mislead people." The APA did not respond to this complaint, nor was Farley ever notified about it by the association.

In the trial of Bedford v. Canada at the Ontario Superior Court of Justice in October 2009, Farley was called as an expert witness by the Attorney General of Canada. The case was brought by current and former sex workers, who argued that Canadian laws restricting prostitution were unconstitutional. Farley's evidence was criticized by presiding judge Susan Himel in her September 2010 conclusion:

I find that some of the evidence tendered on this application did not meet the standards set by Canadian courts for the admission of expert evidence. The parties did not challenge the admissibility of evidence tendered but asked the court to afford little weight to the evidence of the other party.

I found the evidence of Dr. Melissa Farley to be problematic. Although Dr. Farley has conducted a great deal of research on prostitution, her advocacy appears to have permeated her opinions. For example, Dr. Farley's unqualified assertion in her affidavit that prostitution is inherently violent appears to contradict her own findings that prostitutes who work from indoor locations generally experience less violence. Furthermore, in her affidavit, she failed to qualify her opinion regarding the causal relationship between post- traumatic stress disorder and prostitution, namely, that it could be caused by events unrelated to prostitution.

Dr. Farley's choice of language is at times inflammatory and detracts from her conclusions. For example, comments such as "prostitution is to the community what incest is to the family" and "just as pedophiles justify sexual assault of children ... men who use prostitutes develop elaborate cognitive schemes to justify purchase and use of women" make her opinions less persuasive.

Dr. Farley stated during cross-examination that some of her opinions on prostitution were formed prior to her research, including "that prostitution is a terrible harm to women, that prostitution is abusive in its very nature, and that prostitution amounts to men paying a woman for the right to rape her".

Accordingly, for these reasons, I assign less weight to Dr. Farley's evidence.

Since that case in 2011, Farley, with co-authors from the William Mitchell College of Law, reported on the project of Minnesota Indian Women's Sexual Assault Coalition and Prostitution Research and Education, Garden of Truth: the Prostitution and Trafficking of Native Women in Minnesota.

== Works ==
- Farley, Melissa, ed. (1999). Women in prostitution: support for survivors - training for sexual assault counselors. Oakland, California: California Coalition Against Sexual Assault (CALCASA).
- Farley, Melissa; Cotton, A; Lynne, J; Zumbeck, S; Spiwak, F; Reyes, ME; Alvarez, D; Sezgin, U (January 2004). "Prostitution and trafficking in nine countries: Update on violence and posttraumatic stress disorder". Journal of Trauma Practice. 2 (3–4): 33–74. doi:10.1300/J189v02n03_03. S2CID 153827303. (PDF)
- Farley, Melissa, ed. (2004). Prostitution, trafficking and traumatic stress. Binghamton, New York: Haworth Maltreatment & Trauma Press. ISBN 9781136764905. Pdf.
- Farley, Melissa, ed. (2007). Prostitution and trafficking in Nevada: making the connections. San Francisco: Prostitution Research and Education. ISBN 9780615162058.
- Farley, Melissa; Macleod, Jan; Anderson, Lynn; Golding, Jacqueline (2008). Challenging men's demand for prostitution in Scotland: a research report based on interviews with 110 men who bought women in prostitution (PDF). Glasgow, Scotland: Women's Support Project. ISBN 9780955897603.
- Farley, Melissa; Golding, Jacqueline M.; Bindel, Julie (2009). Men who buy sex: who they buy and what they know (PDF). London / San Francisco: Eaves / Prostitution Research & Education. OCLC 602963873.
- Farley, Melissa; Matthews, Nicole; Deer, Sarah; Lopez, Guadalupe; Stark, Christine; Hudon, Eileen (2011) Garden of Truth: the Prostitution and Trafficking of Native Women in Minnesota. A project of Minnesota Indian Women's Sexual Assault Coalition and Prostitution Research and Education, William Mitchell College of Law, Saint Paul, Minnesota, 27 October 2011.
