= Croydon Community Against Trafficking =

Croydon Community Against Trafficking (CCAT) originated in 2004 when a group of local residents were confronted with research that had been released by The Poppy Project (funded by the UK government). The report detailed the scale of prostitution and exploitation across London and the connections to the issue of trafficking. The group set about their own research in an effort to either disprove or reinforce this research or find a different situation altogether. Their focus became, and remains today, the issue of Human Trafficking - specifically, women in Croydon who are forced, against their will, to work in brothels.

The CCAT exists as a coalition of concerned citizens, faith and community groups who aim to stop the injustice of human trafficking for sexual exploitation within the London Borough of Croydon - one of the biggest 'ports' for human trafficking in the UK. 'We want that to stop and we want the people enslaved by this trade in human life to be brought to justice.'

In addition to raising awareness within the London Borough of Croydon and its surrounds, CCAT has also influenced policies nationally and locally. Key amongst these are contributing the U.K.'s ratification of the Treaty of Europe Convention on Human Trafficking (through their involvement with the Stop The Traffik Coalition), the U.K. government's tough new measures to reduced demand for trafficked women , and the withdraw of adult adverts from newspapers such as Newsquest . They have also helped to prioritise this issue for the local police and local council in the borough of Croydon. Most recently the work of The CCAT has been written up as a resource tool for communities to take action against trafficking. This resource called ACT is available on the Stop the Traffik website.

== Related groups ==
- Anti Slavery International
- CARE
- Stop the Traffik
- The Salvation Army

== Media coverage ==
- BBC
- Premier Radio
