= Emma Humphreys =

Welsh murderer (1967–1998)

- Left to right: Harriet Wistrich (with flowers) and Julie Bindel of Justice for Women, with Emma Humphreys (white dress) outside the Old Bailey, London, after Humphreys' release, 7 July 1995.
- Born: Emma Clare Humphreys; 30 October 1967
- Died: 11 July 1998 (aged 30)
- Cause of death: Death by misadventure, overdose of chloral hydrate
- Criminal charge: Murder of her boyfriend and pimp, Trevor Armitage
- Criminal penalty: Convicted on 4 December 1985 and sentenced to life
- Criminal status: Reduced to manslaughter on 7 July 1995, freed for time served

Emma Clare Humphreys (30 October 1967 – 11 July 1998) was a Welsh woman who was imprisoned in England in December 1985, after being convicted of the murder of her violent 33-year-old groomer and pimp, Trevor Armitage.

Aged 17 when convicted, Humphreys spent a decade in prison before winning an appeal against the conviction, on 7 July 1995, on the grounds of long-term provocation. The Court of Appeal reduced the conviction to manslaughter, and she was released immediately. The success of the appeal was significant because it supported the argument that courts should take long-term issues such as "battered woman syndrome" into account when considering a defence of provocation. (Note: "The Court of Appeal quashed her murder conviction holding that her characteristic of attention seeking was sufficiently permanent and could be taken into account in assessing the standard of control expected of the defendant.") Humphreys was assisted in her defence by Justice for Women, a feminist law-reform group founded in 1991 by Julie Bindel and Harriet Wistrich.

Three years after her release, Humphreys died, aged 30, of an accidental overdose of prescription drugs at her flat in Holloway, North London.

== Early life ==
Humphreys was raised with her two sisters, mother and father in Dolgellau, Merionethshire, north-west Wales. Her home life appears to have been chaotic. Her parents separated when she was five and her mother, an alcoholic, remarried; the second husband was reported to have been an alcoholic too. The mother, second husband and Humphreys relocated to Edmonton, Canada, where Humphreys began drinking, taking drugs, and having sex with men. According to her diary, which was found in her biological father's attic three years after her death, she was admitted in March 1983 to the Westfield Diagnostic and Treatment Centre in Edmonton, then transferred to a local psychiatric ward when she cut her wrists.

In December 1983 she returned to Nottingham, England, to live with her biological father and his second wife, and later with her grandmother. On 30 August 1984, when she was 16, she moved out of her grandmother's home and began working as a street prostitute. Humphreys was soon approached by 33-year-old Trevor Armitage, a drug addict with convictions for violence. The Court of Appeal heard that Armitage "had a predilection for girls much younger than himself" and was known by the vice squad to drive around the red-light district most evenings. Humphreys moved into his house in Turnbury Road, Bulwell. She continued working as a prostitute and gave Armitage part of her earnings. She said that he began hitting her.

In January 1985, Humphreys was arrested and kept on remand at HM Prison Risley for two incidents, one of which involved assaulting a hotel manager. She was conditionally discharged on 21 February 1985. While she was on remand, according to the Court of Appeal, Armitage allowed a second young girl to live at his home.

== Conviction ==
=== Killing ===
On 24 February 1985, a Mrs Whitehead saw Humphreys in a bar; according to the Court of Appeal, she told the original trial that Humphreys had seemed "very lonely, depressed and desolate". Humphreys, Armitage and several others had spent the evening of 25 February 1985 in a pub. On the way out of the pub—accompanied by his 16-year-old son, Humphreys, and two of his friends—Armitage allegedly said: "We'll be all right for a gang bang tonight."

The group went to another pub, then back to Armitage's house. While Armitage was driving his son home, Humphreys retrieved two knives from the kitchen and cut both her wrists, then went to sit on the landing. When Armitage returned to the house, he went into the bedroom and removed his clothes, except for his shirt, then sat on the landing next to Humphreys. She told the court that she believed his removal of clothing meant that he wanted sex from her, something she did not want.

At this point, Humphreys said Armitage taunted her about the cuts on her wrists, saying she had not done a very good job. She responded by stabbing him with one of the knives, piercing his heart and liver. He died of his injuries.

=== Trial ===
Humphreys was remanded in custody and tried in December 1985 at Nottingham Crown Court, before Kenneth Jones J and a jury. During a medical examination just after the killing, a doctor had found "three recent cuts to her right wrist, fifteen well-healed scars to her right forearm, nine recent cuts running across her left wrist with fresh, dry blood over them, and seven well-healed vertical scars running up her left forearm". A psychiatrist told the court that Humphreys was "of abnormal mentality, with immature, explosive and attention-seeking traits, the last trait referring to her tendency to slash her wrists", according to the Court of Appeal.

The judge directed the jury to, in effect, ignore the psychiatric report. In considering how a reasonable woman would respond to the situation in which Humphreys had found herself, the jury should not attribute to the reasonable woman the "abnormal characteristics" the psychiatrist had described; that is, those characteristics were not "eligible for attribution to the reasonable woman". Instead, he told the jury to consider only the events immediately before the killing, and the effect Armitage's taunting would have had on a woman who "did not have a distorted and explosive personality". He told the jury:

It is for you to decide, taking into account all the evidence, as to what effect that jeering at her over not having made a good job of cutting her wrists might have had on a young woman who had got herself into that situation but did not have a distorted and explosive personality.

On 4 December 1985 Humphreys was convicted of murder and sentenced to be detained at her Majesty's pleasure. She applied for leave to appeal on 2 January 1986, but it was refused.

== R v Humphreys ==
=== Justice for Women ===
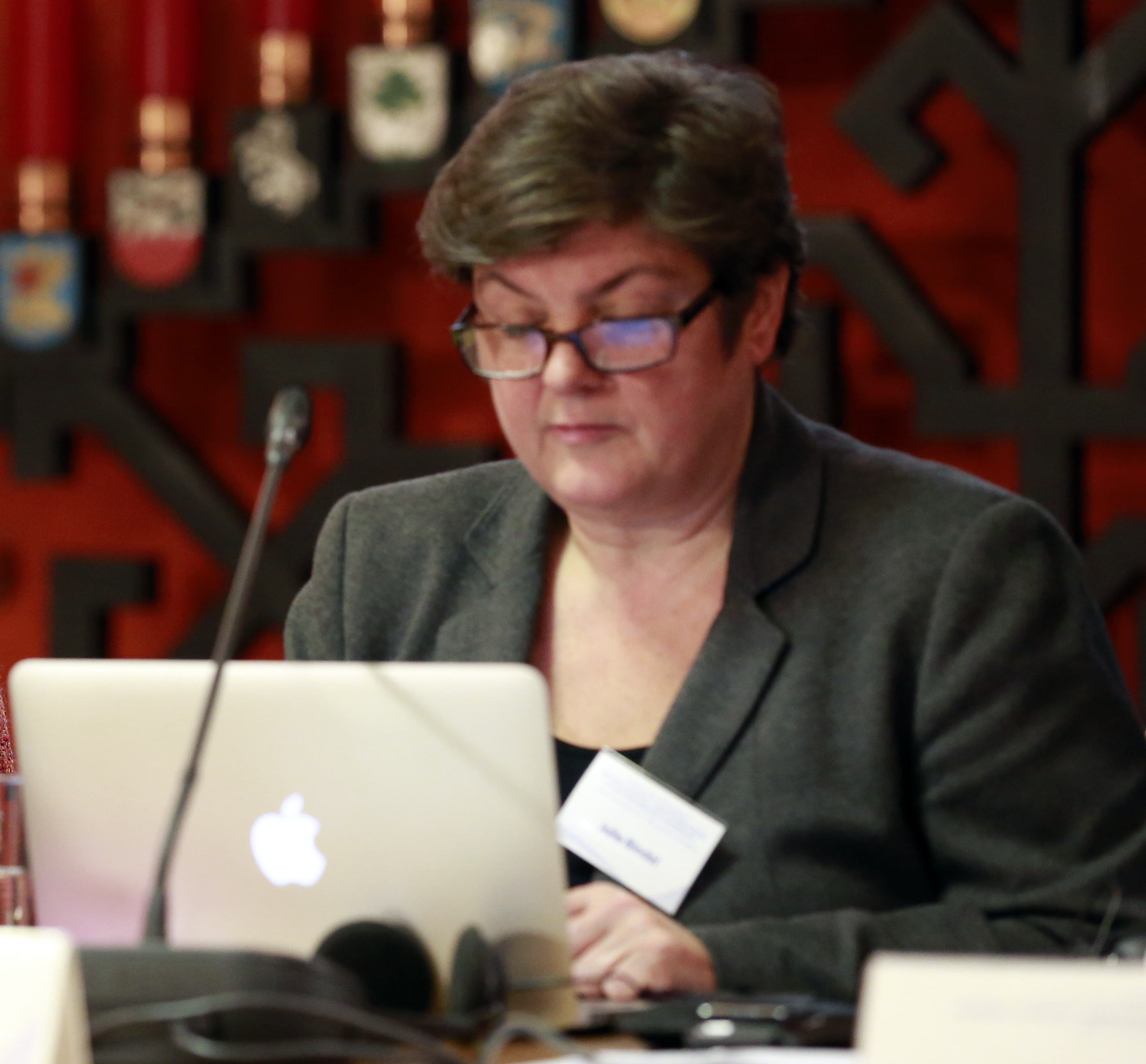
Julie Bindel

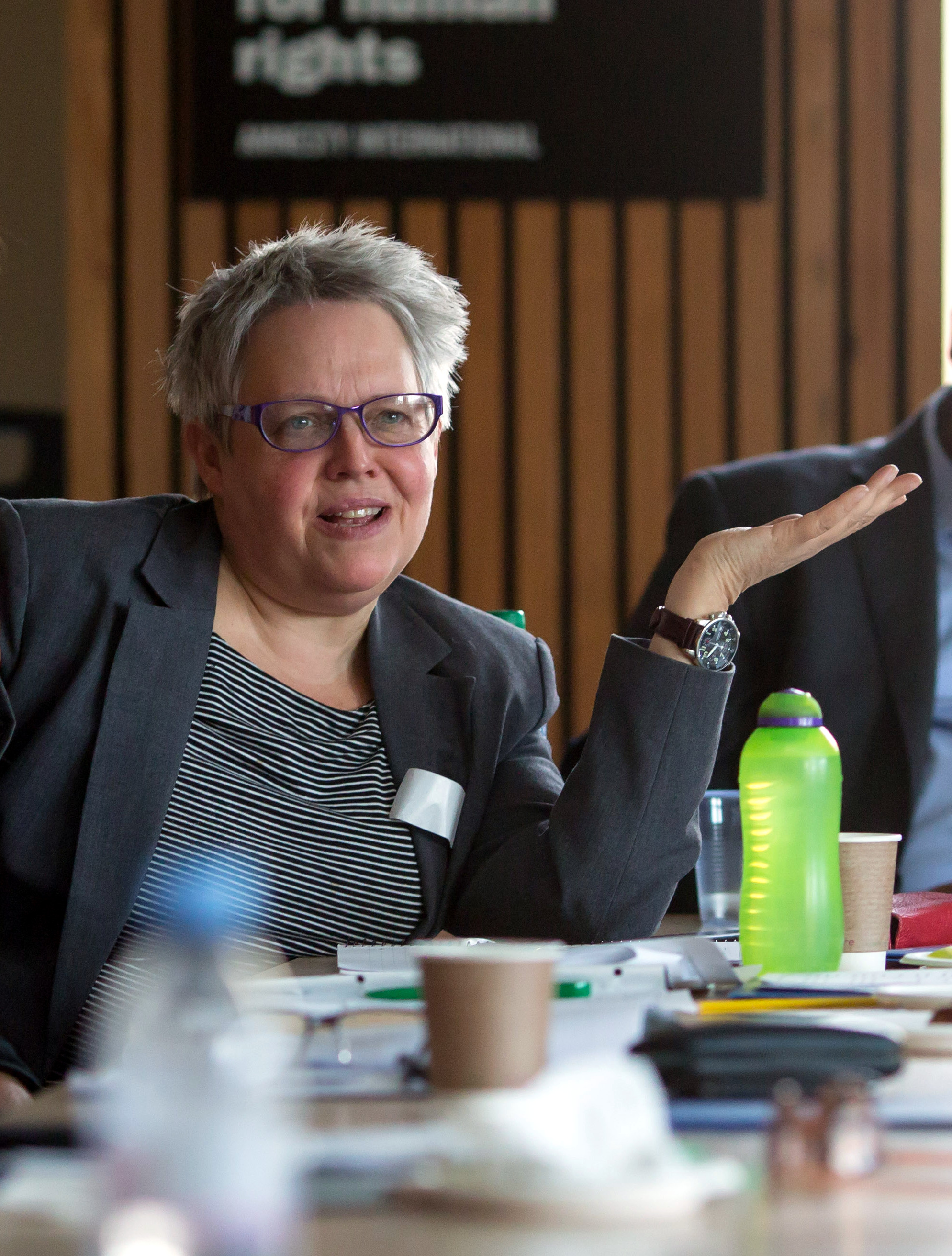
Harriet Wistrich

In 1992, Humphreys read about the release of Kiranjit Ahluwalia, whose conviction for murder after she killed her violent husband was reduced to manslaughter, thanks to a campaign led by Southall Black Sisters and joined by Justice for Women. The latter was founded in 1991 by Julie Bindel and Harriet Wistrich, who later qualified as a solicitor. On 24 September 1992, from Holloway Prison in north London, Humphreys wrote to Bindel to ask for help.

Dear Justice for Women, I hope you don't mind me writing to you. I'll try to keep this brief because you're probably very busy. In December 85 I was convicted of murdering my boyfriend, Trevor Armitage, who was 35. I had met him six months previously when I was 16. I was a prostitute and he was a client. I was 17 at the time of the offence and 24 now. The night of the offence, I had a knife in my hand from cutting my wrists because I wanted some kind of response from him other than physical abuse or rape again. As I heard him coming, I panicked that maybe he could turn even worse and turn the knife on me, and I was cornered upstairs. He came and laid beside where I was sitting. He was undressed, and I knew I was going to be raped again, beaten, or both. I couldn't go through it again. I just wanted him to get away from me.

Bindel and Wistrich arranged for a legal team and helped to organize an appeal based on the defence of long-term provocation. In January 1995, the Court of Appeal granted Humphreys leave to appeal "on the basis of new grounds of appeal relating to the judge's direction to the jury".

=== Appeal ===
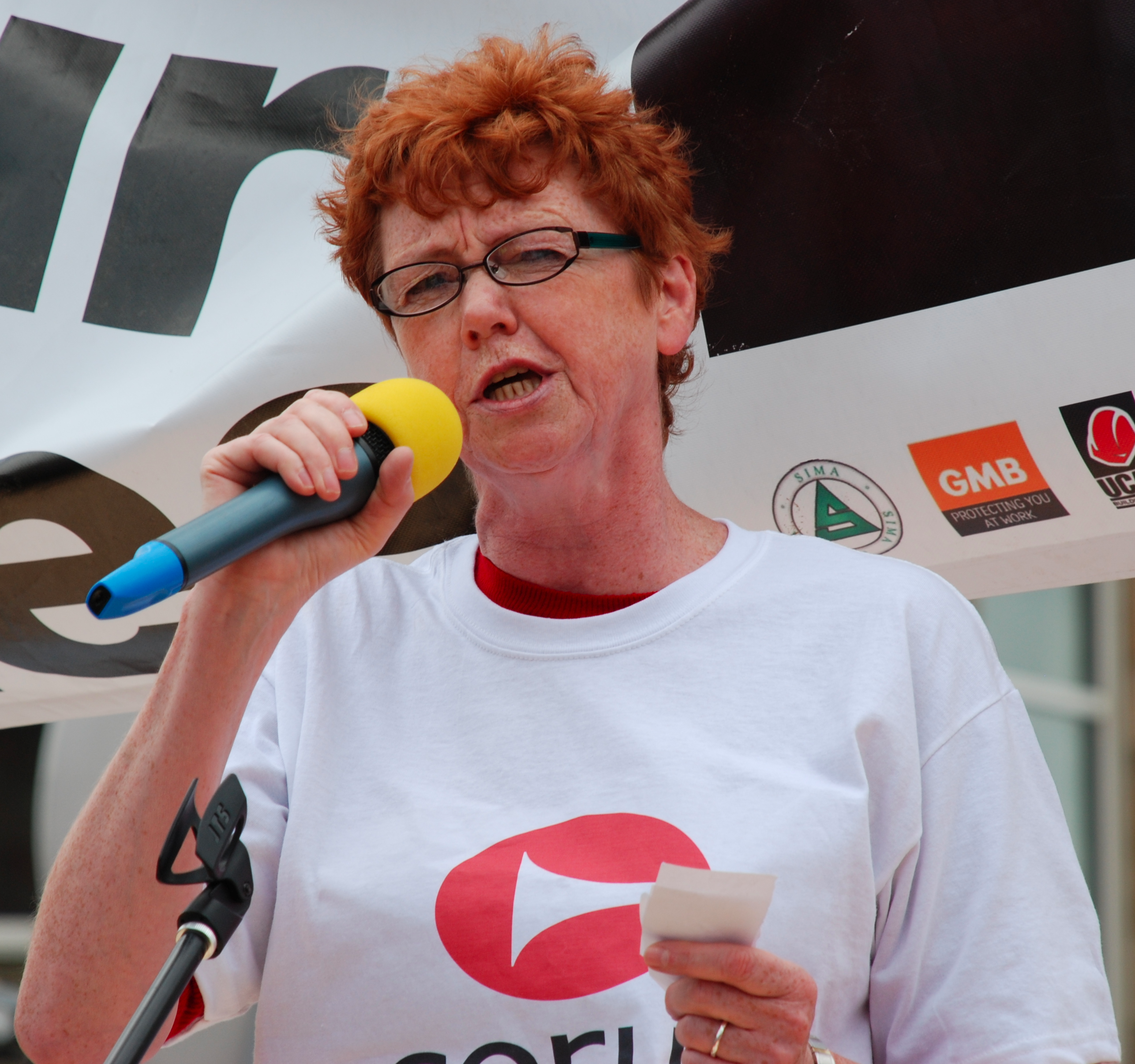
Barristers Vera Baird (above) and Helen Grindrod QC represented Humphreys in court.

The case (R v Humphreys [1995] 4 All ER 1008) was heard by Lord Justice Hirst, Mr Justice Cazalet and Mr Justice Kay over three days on 29 and 30 June and 7 July 1995. Humphreys was represented by Helen Grindrod QC and Vera Baird, instructed by R. R. Sanghvi & Co. Rhys Davies QC wrote that it was Grindrod's "powerful and charismatic advocacy that won the day" for Humphreys. Representing the Crown were John Milmo QC and Adrian Reynolds.

The grounds of the appeal revolved around the concept of the reasonable person, and which characteristics to attribute to that person when deciding how she would have responded to a situation. As laid out by the Court of Appeal, the grounds were that "the judge had erred (i) in not directing the jury that they could take the seriously abnormal personality of the appellant into account as a characteristic to be attributed to the reasonable person when considering whether that person would have lost her self-control and behaved as the appellant did; and (ii) in restricting the jury's attention to events immediately surrounding the killing."

On 7 July, the judges accepted the defence position, namely that "[w]hen considering whether the reasonable person would be provoked in the circumstances of a defendant, the jury was entitled to take into account characteristics of the defendant which were not repugnant to the general concept of the reasonable person, including a permanent psychological illness or disorder which was abnormal, such as attention-seeking through wrist-slashing."

News reports show Humphreys leaving the Old Bailey that day with Bindel and Wistrich after the judges substituted the murder conviction for a verdict of manslaughter and sentenced Humphreys to time served. Wistrich told a press conference: "Whilst we applaud the judges for their decision, we do not feel grateful that a simple act of justice has taken this long. Justice for Emma has come ten years too late. This case has been a miscarriage of justice on a par with that of the Guildford Four and Judith Ward."

=== Significance ===
The English law on provocation had been biased in favour of men, who are more likely to react immediately with anger to a provocative event. Legal scholar Clare Connelly writes that, by challenging this in the 1990s, the cases of Kiranjit Ahluwalia (R v Ahluwalia [1992] 4 All ER 889), Humphreys (R v Humphreys [1995] 4 All ER 1008), and Sarah Thornton (R v Thornton (No 2) [1996] 2 All ER 1023) were "monumental in securing legal recognition of the experience of abused women who kill their violent partners". Both Ahluwalia and Thornton had killed their violent husbands while the men slept.

Before R v Humphreys, the test for provocation involved asking whether the accused had experienced a "sudden and temporary" loss of control, and whether a reasonable person would have been similarly provoked in that situation. The definition of provocation was based on Devlin J in R v Duffy [1949] 1 All ER 932: "Provocation is some act, or series of acts done (or words spoken) ... which would cause in any reasonable person and actually causes in the accused, a sudden and temporary loss of self-control, rendering the accused so subject to passion as to make him or her for the moment not master of his or her mind."

Any lapse of time between the provocative event and the killing suggested that the accused could have taken advantage of a "cooling-off period" but chose not to do so. Legal scholar Anne Bottomley explains that, before R v Humphreys, courts did not recognize the "cumulative effect of violence ... The emphasis was almost entirely localised to the 'provocative act' immediately prior to the killing". Examples of what courts regarded as provocative acts and typical responses were sudden, explosive and masculine. The emotions experienced by "battered women" were not considered.

Bottomley writes that the Court of Appeal made two important rulings in R v Humphreys. First, immaturity and attention-seeking were accepted as characteristics "within the meaning of the Camplin test"; that is, the jury was entitled to consider whether a reasonable person with those characteristics would have been provoked. Second, the effect of the taunt should have been considered within the context of the entire relationship. According to the Court of Appeal:

This tempestuous relationship was a complex story with several distinct and cumulative strands of potentially provocative conduct building up until the final encounter.

Over the long term there was the continuing cruelty, represented by the beatings and the continued encouragement of prostitution and by the breakdown of the sexual relationship.

On the first part of the night in question there was the threatened "gang bang" and the drunkenness. Immediately before the killing, quite apart from the wounding verbal taunt, there was his appearance in an undressed state, posing a threat of sex which she did not want and which he must have known she did not want, thus demonstrating potentially provocative conduct immediately beforehand, not only by words but also by deeds.

Finally, of course, there is the taunt itself, which was put forward as the crucial trigger which caused the appellant's self control to snap.

== Death ==
On 11 July 1998, three years after her release, Wistrich and Bindel found Humphreys dead in bed at her home from an apparently accidental overdose of chloral hydrate. In September 2000, Humphreys' family doctor told the inquest, at St Pancras Coroner's Court, that Humphreys was first prescribed the drug in Holloway prison because she had had difficulty sleeping. According to a friend, she had taken too much of the drug several times since her release and seemed to be addicted to it. When she died, she weighed just 70 lbs (31.7 kg) and had 20 times the recommended dose in her blood. Bindel told the inquest that Humphreys had been "thrown out of prison and left to her own devices". The jury returned a verdict of death by misadventure. According to Julie Bindel, Humphreys told her that she had been raped by a stranger in her own apartment a few weeks before her death, and attributed her increased drug-taking to coping with the assault.

== Diary ==
After her death, Humphreys' father gave Bindel and Wistrich a suitcase he had kept in his attic that contained her belongings, including a diary dating to three years before she killed Armitage. Had the diary been available at the original trial, it could have been used in Humphreys' defence.

The diary includes material from March 1983, when Humphreys was 15 and living with her stepfather in Edmonton, Canada. She had been admitted to the Westfield Diagnostic and Treatment Centre and to a local psychiatric ward. She describes how her mother was drinking a lot and not eating. In November 1983, preparing to spend Christmas in England, she tells her diary:

Emma's gone away! She's cold, lonely and ready to give up on life. She's upset, shaking. She's falling apart because of all of the suspense, she thinks people are going to lock her away where people don't care. She's old and baggy-looking. Six weeks till Christmas, that makes her scared, how could her passport be ready in six weeks? Why is she throwing it all away? Don't let them win, Emma. Come back and start to fight again. It's a long, hard game but you can do it, don't give in. She feels dirty. Emma's crazy, Emma's crazy, Emma's crazy. No. Emma needs security, reassurance, space, warmth and love. She keeps coming back but she slips away, right away.

Back in the UK in 1984, she describes her mother's attempted suicide, her mother being beaten by her husband (Humphreys' stepfather), and how her mother would refer to her as "fat bitch". (Humphreys was painfully thin.) By September that year, she is working as a prostitute and has met Trevor Armitage. "It's fucking cold outside, standing there for a couple of hours. I've had no problem with the cops out there. I get a lot of compliments from everyone 'cause of my legs." She moves in with Armitage that month, aged 16.

Dad phoned me last week; he asked me what I wanted for my birthday. Yes, I'm 17 in 35 days, god I don't want to grow up 'cause it scares me. I think Trevor is sick of me already. Every time I fuck I get a brownie coloured discharge, but I'm scared to go to the doctors in case it's something I don't want. So at work I just do oral even though I hate it.

Throughout September and October 1984 she describes Armitage hitting her and calling her a liar. She leaves him in November, determined not to go back, but then does go back. The second-last entry is on 19 January 1985. She had been arrested and kept in custody a few days earlier for assaulting a hotel manager. According to The Guardian, she was released on 21 February into Armitage's "care". She killed him four days later.

Bindel and Wistrich co-edited a book, based on Humphreys' diary, The Map of My Life: The Story of Emma Humphreys (2003). The book has a foreword by Vera Baird, one of the barristers who represented Humphreys, and contributions from Beatrix Campbell and friends of Humphreys. Justice for Women awards the annual Emma Humphreys Memorial Prize to women who raise awareness about violence against women and children.

== See also ==
- Sara Thornton case
