= Frank A. Gerbode =

American psychologist

Frank A. Gerbode wrote of a method known as traumatic incident reduction (TIR). He is an Honors graduate of Stanford University and later pursued graduate studies in philosophy at Cambridge University. He received his medical degree from Yale University, and completed a psychiatric residency at Stanford University Medical Center in the early 1970s.

Gerbode is the author of numerous papers and articles, which have been published in the Journal of Neurochemistry, the International Journal of Neuropharmacology, the Journal of Rational Emotive and Cognitive Behavioral Therapy, IRM Newsletter and elsewhere. They include at least one article in Nature

He teaches and lectures internationally, and is the author of Beyond Psychology: An Introduction to Metapsychology (ISBN 1-887927-00-X), published in 1988. This book provided the first published description of TIR.

He edited the special issue "Trauma treatment techniques : innovative trends" of Haworth Press's Journal of Aggression, Maltreatment & Trauma.

Gerbode was for many years a Scientologist, and at one time ran the Palo Alto, California Mission of Scientology. He broke from the Church of Scientology in 1982. He later developed TIR, starting from Dianetics and working back to its origins.

In 1984, Gerbode founded the Institute for Research in Metapsychology and the Center for Applied Metapsychology in Palo Alto, California. Today, this function is fulfilled by the Traumatic Incident Reduction Association, a division of Applied Metapsychology International.

Gerbode currently resides in Sonoma, California.

== Gerbode and "Modern Metapsychology" ==
Frank A. Gerbode created a psychotherapeutic modality (whose adherents often characterize it as a "movement") that he called "metapsychology," forming the term not as a compound of "psychology" with the prefix "meta," but as a portmanteau representing a fusion of metaphysics and psychology. Gerbode uses a client-centered approach that supports clients in their efforts to improve their self-organization, enhancing their strength for coping with past negative experiences. Using metapsychology as the basis, Gerbode uses traumatic incident reduction (TRI) to treat people experiencing psychological effects from traumatic incidents or clients suffering from posttraumatic stress disorder. Gerbode's Metapsychology is a theoretically explicit psychology, which has the main purpose to connect the mind and body while maintaining a client-centered setting. It serves as a solid base in a client-centered psychology system because it involves what is common in experience, leading to an agreement and understanding It considers different aspects and views from the client to explain how the psychological issue is functioning in whole. This psychology is meant to emphasize the experiences as viewed by the client and not by the views of a psychologist trying to find out what the experience means to that person. Metapsychology allows people to recognize that they are in control of their own experiences. Once they can recognize these experiences, then they become aware of ways in which they can improve themselves and the environment around them. The "modern metapsychology" movement was founded by psychiatrist Frank A. Gerbode, and frames therapy as a way of developing the spirit for personal growth, rather than as a treatment for mental disorders. Gerbode's reasoning in his choice of the term "metapsychology" is best illustrated in his formulation, "While parapsychology and metaphysics concern themselves with uncommon experiences, metapsychology deals with what is common in experience."

Note that while the term "parapsychology" is universally understood (by its practitioners and critics alike) to refer to the study of unexplained powers of the human mind, "metaphysics" has two separate meanings that have little to do with each other. In the popular discourse of the New Age movement, upon which Gerbode's work draws, metaphysics is an important but vague term with a broad range of usages, generally having to do with alternatives to physics, rather than philosophical foundations for it. New Age metaphysics concerns claims about the numerous elements of New Age culture including reincarnation, divination, psychedelics, and parapsychology (each of which has its own history and outside the New Age movement). But among philosophers, metaphysics is a term coined by Aristotle, denoting the branch of philosophy that engages with fundamental questions that transcend physics (especially ontology, the study of existence and being). Gerbode used the term in its New Age sense, not the philosophical one.

Gerbode has a main focus in traumatic incident reduction (TIR) which is a very structured and self-centered process that is used to lessen the negative effects of past traumas and encourage the person to become more aware of their inner strengths and embrace them. In 1985, he founded the Applied Metapsychology International (AMI). The main objective of this group was to develop metapsychological "techniques, methods, and training material" for psychologists seeking to practice TIR. Gerbode strongly believed in TIR as a way to treat patients with posttraumatic stress disorder (PTSD). His metapsychology promotes a person-centered process, based on direct experiences, to eliminate psychological symptoms experienced by people who experiences traumatic incidents.

== Selected publications ==
- Gerbode, Frank (May 2006). "Traumatic incident reduction: a person-centered, client-titrated exposure technique". Journal of Aggression, Maltreatment & Trauma. 12 (1–2): 151–167. doi:10.1300/J146v12n01_08. S2CID 142097079.
- Gerbode, Frank A. (2011). Beyond psychology: an introduction to metapsychology (4th ed.). Ann Arbor, Michigan: Applied Metapsychology International Press/ Loving Healing Press. ISBN 9781615991235.
