= Kiranjit Ahluwalia =

Indian woman rights activist

- Born: 1955 (age 70–71); Chak Kalal, Punjab, India
- Occupations: Human rights activist, author
- Children: 2 sons

Kiranjit Ahluwalia (born 1955) is an Indian woman who fatally burned her husband in 1989 in the UK. She claimed it was in response to ten years of physical, psychological, and sexual abuse. After initially being convicted of murder and sentenced to life in prison, Ahluwalia's conviction was later overturned on grounds of inadequate counsel and replaced with voluntary manslaughter. Although her submission of provocation failed (under R v Duffy the loss of control needed to be sudden, which this was not), she successfully pleaded the partial defence of diminished responsibility under s.2 Homicide Act 1957 on the grounds that fresh medical evidence (which was not available at her original trial) may indicate diminished mental responsibility.

The film Provoked (2006) is a fictionalised account of Ahluwalia's life.

== Background ==
In 1977, at the age of 22, Kiranjit left her home in Chak Kalal in Punjab to travel to Canada where she visited her sister. On 21 July 1979, she travelled to the UK where she married Deepak, whom she had met only once. She stated that she had endured domestic abuse for ten years, including physical violence, food deprivation, and marital rape at the hands of her husband.

When Kiranjit looked to her family for help, they reprimanded her by saying it was a matter of family honour that she remain with her husband. She ultimately tried running away from home but was found by her husband and brought back. During her marriage, the couple had two sons, who Kiranjit claimed often bore witness to the violence that she endured. However, neither boy gave evidence supporting that in court or police interviews prior to the trial.

One evening in the spring of 1989, Kiranjit was allegedly attacked by her husband. She later accused him of trying to break her ankles and burn her face with a hot iron, apparently trying to extort money from her extended family. Later that night, while her husband lay sleeping, Kiranjit fetched some petrol and caustic soda from the garage and mixed it to create napalm. She poured it over the bed and set it alight, and ran into a garden with their three-year-old son.

In a later interview, she stated: "I decided to show him how much it hurt. At times I had tried to run away, but he would catch me and beat me even harder. I decided to burn his feet so he couldn't run after me." She also claimed, "I wanted to give him a scar like those he had given me, to have him suffer pain as I had."

Deepak suffered severe burns over 40% of his body and died 10 days later in hospital from complications of the burns and subsequent sepsis. Kiranjit, who could then speak only broken English, was arrested and ultimately charged with murder.

== Trial and conviction ==
Kiranjit was convicted of murder in December 1989. At the trial, the prosecution argued that although on the night of the event she had been threatened with a hot poker, the fact that she waited until her husband had gone to sleep was evidence that she had time to "cool off". In addition, the prosecution claimed that her prior knowledge to mix caustic soda with petrol to create napalm was not common knowledge and so was proof that she had planned her husband's murder. Her counsel did not make any claims about the violence she later claimed she had endured, and the prosecution suggested that Kiranjit was motivated by jealousy because of her husband's repeated affairs. She was found guilty of murder and sentenced to life in prison.

== Appeal and release ==
Kiranjit's case eventually came to the attention of the Southall Black Sisters, who pressed for a mistrial. Her conviction was overturned on appeal in 1992 on grounds of insufficient counsel since Kiranjit had not been aware that she could plead guilty to manslaughter on the grounds of diminished responsibility. In addition, it was brought to light that she was suffering from severe depression when she set fire to her husband, which her new counsel argued had then altered her decision making abilities. After the mistrial was declared, a re-trial was ordered and on September 25, 1992 Kiranjit was found guilty of manslaughter due to diminished responsibility and sentenced to three years and four months (the time she had already served). Kiranjit was released immediately.

== Impact ==
Kiranjit's case helped raise awareness of domestic violence in families of non-English-speaking immigrants to Western countries and changed the laws for domestic abuse victims in the United Kingdom.

Her case, known in British legal textbooks as R v Ahluwalia, changed the definition of the word "provocation" in cases of battered women to reclassify her crime as manslaughter, instead of murder. This led to the freeing of Emma Humphreys and Sara Thornton in the same year.

Kiranjit was honoured in 2001 at the first Asian Women Awards in recognition of her "strength, personal achievements, determination and commitment" in helping to bring to light the subject of domestic violence.

She wrote an autobiography with coauthor Rahila Gupta, Circle of Light.

Gita Sahgal made a film called Unprovoked for the British television investigative documentary programme Dispatches on the subject of Kiranjit's experience.

The story was fictionalised in the film Provoked, which was screened at the 2007 Cannes Film Festival. Naveen Andrews played Deepak and Aishwarya Rai played the role of Kiranjit. During the screening at Cannes, Kiranjit sat next to Rai, holding her hand and sobbing during the most violent scenes.

== See also ==
- Francine Hughes, an American woman with extremely similar circumstances
