= Harriet Wistrich =

British lawyer and radical feminist

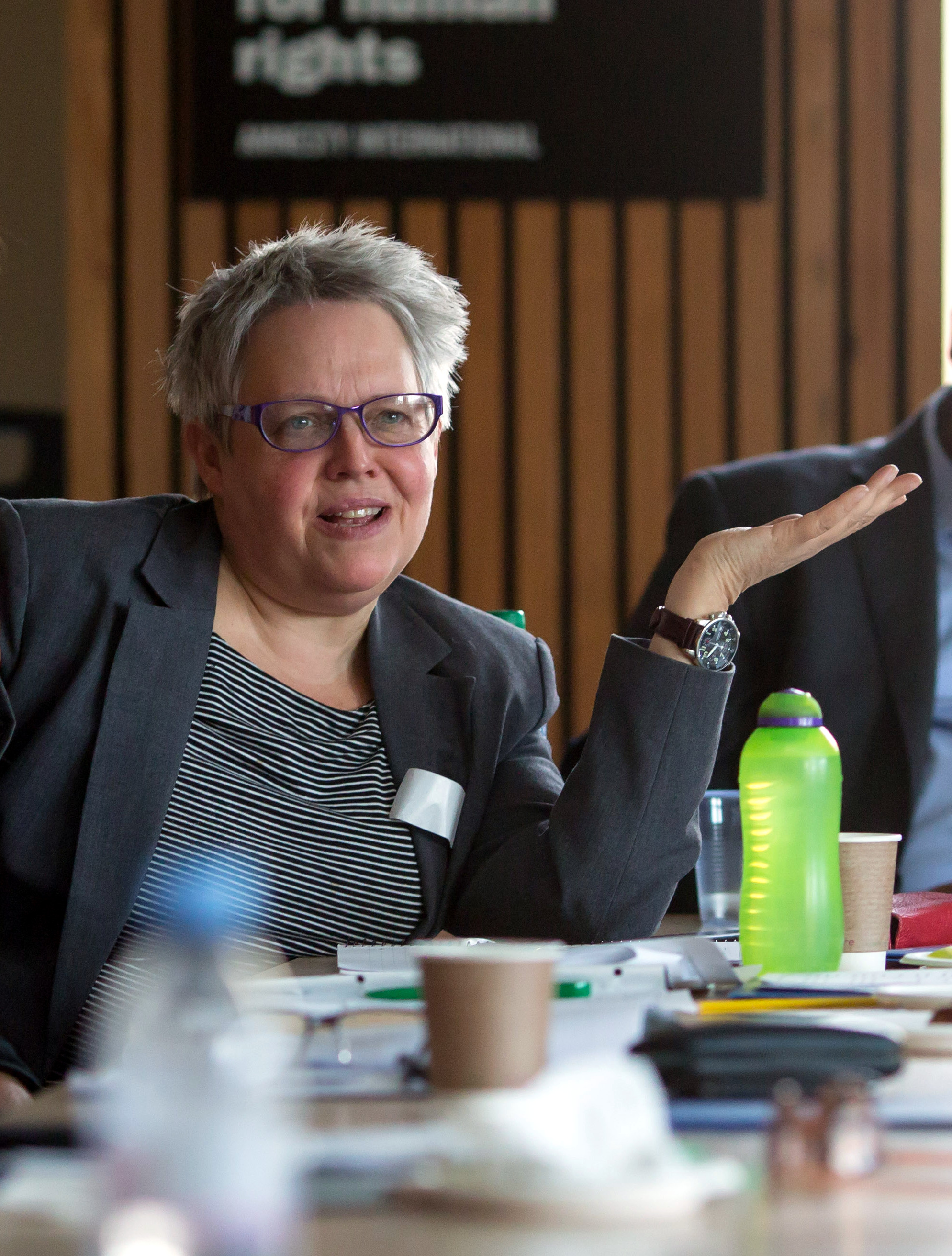
- Wistrich in 2016
- Born: Harriet Katherine Wistrich; 1960 (age 65–66); Hampstead, London, England
- Education: University of Oxford
- Occupations: Solicitor, writer
- Organization: Co-founder of Justice for Women
- Known for: Law reform
- Movement: Radical feminism, lesbian feminism
- Partner: Julie Bindel
- Parent(s): Enid Wistrich; Ernest Wistrich

Harriet Katherine Wistrich (born 1960) is an English solicitor and radical feminist who specialises in human-rights cases, particularly cases involving women who have been sexually assaulted or who have killed their violent partners. She works for Birnberg Pierce & Partners in London. She was Liberty's Human Rights Lawyer of the Year in 2014.

Wistrich is co-founder of Justice for Women, the feminist law-reform group, and founding director of the Centre for Women's Justice. She has written for The Guardian and is the editor, with her partner Julie Bindel, of The Map of My Life: The Story of Emma Humphreys (2003).

== Background ==
=== Family ===
Harriet Katherine Wistrich was born in Hampstead to Enid (d. 2020) and Ernest Wistrich (d. 2015), both secular Jews, who wed in 1950. Enid became Reader in Politics and Public Administration at Middlesex University (1979–1995), and thereafter Visiting Professor of Political Science. She had been a Labour councillor (for the Priory ward of Camden Council 1965–1968 and 1971–1974) and chair of the Greater London Council Film Viewing Board in the 1970s. Her publications include "I don't mind the sex, it's the violence": Film Censorship Explored (1979), The Politics of Transport (1983), and, with David M. Smith, Devolution and Localism in England (2014).

Ernest was originally from the Free City of Danzig; he attended boarding school in Brighton before moving to the UK permanently shortly before Germany invaded Poland in 1939. Like his wife, he became a local Labour councillor (for the Swiss Cottage ward of Camden Council 1971–1974), and was a parliamentary candidate. He served as director of the European Movement from 1966 and was appointed CBE. He was the author of The United States of Europe (1992).

=== Early life and education ===
The Wistrichs married in 1950 and had three children. Matthew, born in 1957, was disabled and died when he was 14. Harriet was born in 1960 and Daniel in 1964. Raised as secular, non-kosher and non-Zionist, the children joined the Woodcraft Folk and lived in what Julie Bindel called a "liberal, upper-middle-class household". His upbringing notwithstanding, Daniel moved to Israel when he was 23 and became a Hasidic Jew.

Wistrich went to Hampstead School and City of East London College, then Oxford University, where she became a feminist, came out as a lesbian, and graduated with a degree in Philosophy, Politics and Economics. After Oxford, she and a friend hitchhiked around the country looking for a city they could make their home. They chose Liverpool, where Wistrich became involved in film-making before deciding to study law. She took a two-year law conversion course and completed her legal practice course in 1995 at the University of Westminster in London. In 1997, she qualified as a solicitor after training with Winstanley Burgess, one of the UK's "most respected asylum and immigration law practices".

== Career ==
=== Justice for Women ===
In 1991 Wistrich co-founded the feminist law-reform group Justice for Women (JFW)—with Julie Bindel and Hilary McCollum—to campaign against laws that discriminate against women in cases involving male violence against partners. JFW had originally been set up as the Free Sara Thornton campaign to secure the release of Sara Thornton, convicted in 1989 of murdering her violent husband. E. Jane Dickson wrote in The Independent in 1995 that the group was run by Wistrich, Bindel and their dog, Peggy, out of their home in North London.

External videos
- Humphreys, Wistrich and Bindel on the steps of the Old Bailey, 7 July 1995 (YouTube video, directed by Pratibha Parmar)

One of JFW's earliest cases was that of Emma Humphreys, who had been convicted of murder after killing her violent pimp boyfriend in 1985, when she was 17. In September 1992 she wrote to JFW from prison asking for help, and with Wistrich's and Bindel's support, she successfully appealed the conviction, claiming long-term provocation. News reports from 7 July 1995 (right) show the three women leaving the Old Bailey after the judges ordered that Humphreys be released. Wistrich told a press conference that the case had been "a miscarriage of justice on a par with that of the Guildford Four and Judith Ward".

Three years later, Wistrich and Bindel found Humphreys dead in bed at her home from an accidental overdose of prescription drugs. Based on Humphreys' diary, which was found only after her death, they co-edited a book, The Map of My Life: The Story of Emma Humphreys (2003). JFW awards the annual Emma Humphreys Memorial Prize to those raising awareness about violence against women and children.

=== Cases ===
Wistrich joined Birnberg Peirce & Partners in 2002. She has represented several women in successful appeals against murder convictions, including Stacey Hyde, Christine Devaney, Diane Butler, and Kirsty Scamp, and other litigants in high-profile cases. The latter include Jane Andrews, who was released on licence in 2015, two female detainees in Yarl's Wood Immigration Removal Centre who alleged sexual assault by staff, eight women affected by the UK undercover policing relationships scandal, and two women who were attacked by John Worboys, a serial rapist; they successfully sued the police for having failed to investigate their complaints. Wistrich also represented the family of Jean Charles de Menezes, who was shot and killed by police in London in July 2005.

In 2016 she became founding director of the Centre for Women's Justice, a charity that seeks to "hold the state accountable for failures in the prevention of violence against women and girls". Nick Cohen has called her "the best feminist lawyer I know".

=== Books ===
Her 2024 book Sister in Law: Shocking true stories of fighting for justice in a legal system designed by men was shortlisted for the Women's Prize for Non-Fiction in 2025.

== Selected works ==
- (2015). "Gayle Newland behaved no worse than rogue undercover police officers". The Guardian, 17 September 2015.
- (2015). "New rape guidelines are welcome – if they’re actually followed". The Guardian, 29 January 2015.
- (2009). "Jean Charles de Menezes". Socialist Lawyer. 51, January 2009, 12–14. JSTOR 42950312
- (2008) with Frank Arnold and Emma Ginn. "Outsourcing Abuse: The use and misuse of state-sanctioned force during the detention and the removal of asylumseekers". Birnberg Peirce & Partners, Medical Justice and the National Coalition of Anti-Deportation Campaigns.
- (2003) with Julie Bindel (eds.). The Map of My Life: The Story of Emma Humphreys. London: Astraia Press. ISBN 978-0954634100
- (1988) with Lynn Alderson. "Clause 29: Radical Feminist Perspectives". Trouble & Strife, 13: 3–8.
- (1988). "The Use and Misuse of Identity Politics", in D. Harway (ed.) A Word in Edgeways: Jewish Feminists Respond. London: Jewish Feminist Publications, 22–29.
