= Helen Grindrod =

British judge (1936–2002)

- Born: Helen Marjorie Grindrod; 28 February 1936; Aigburth, Liverpool
- Died: 11 July 2002 (aged 66)
- Education: Liverpool Institute High School for Girls; St Hilda's College, Oxford
- Occupation: Judge

Helen Marjorie Grindrod (28 February 1936 – 11 July 2002) was a British judge. She was one of the United Kingdom's most senior female judges.

== Biography ==
Grindrod was born in Aigburth, Liverpool, and attended the Liverpool Institute High School for Girls and St Hilda's College, Oxford. After meeting her husband at Oxford through the theatre she taught at Lockleaze school in Bristol. She was called to the bar at Lincoln's Inn in 1966.

In the 1980s she was part of the prosecution team for the Toxteth Riots trials in 1981 and against British Nuclear Fuels who were found to have contaminated beaches near their Sellafield plant with radioactive waste.

In the 1990s, she defended Emma Humphreys who was accused of killing her abusive pimp. In 1996 she prosecuted the businessman Owen Oyston who was accused of rape.

In 2000, she was diagnosed with cancer. In 2002, she died from the disease. The Helen Grindrod Social Mobility Prize at Lincoln's Inn is in her name.
