= Jennifer Nadel =

British writer and journalist

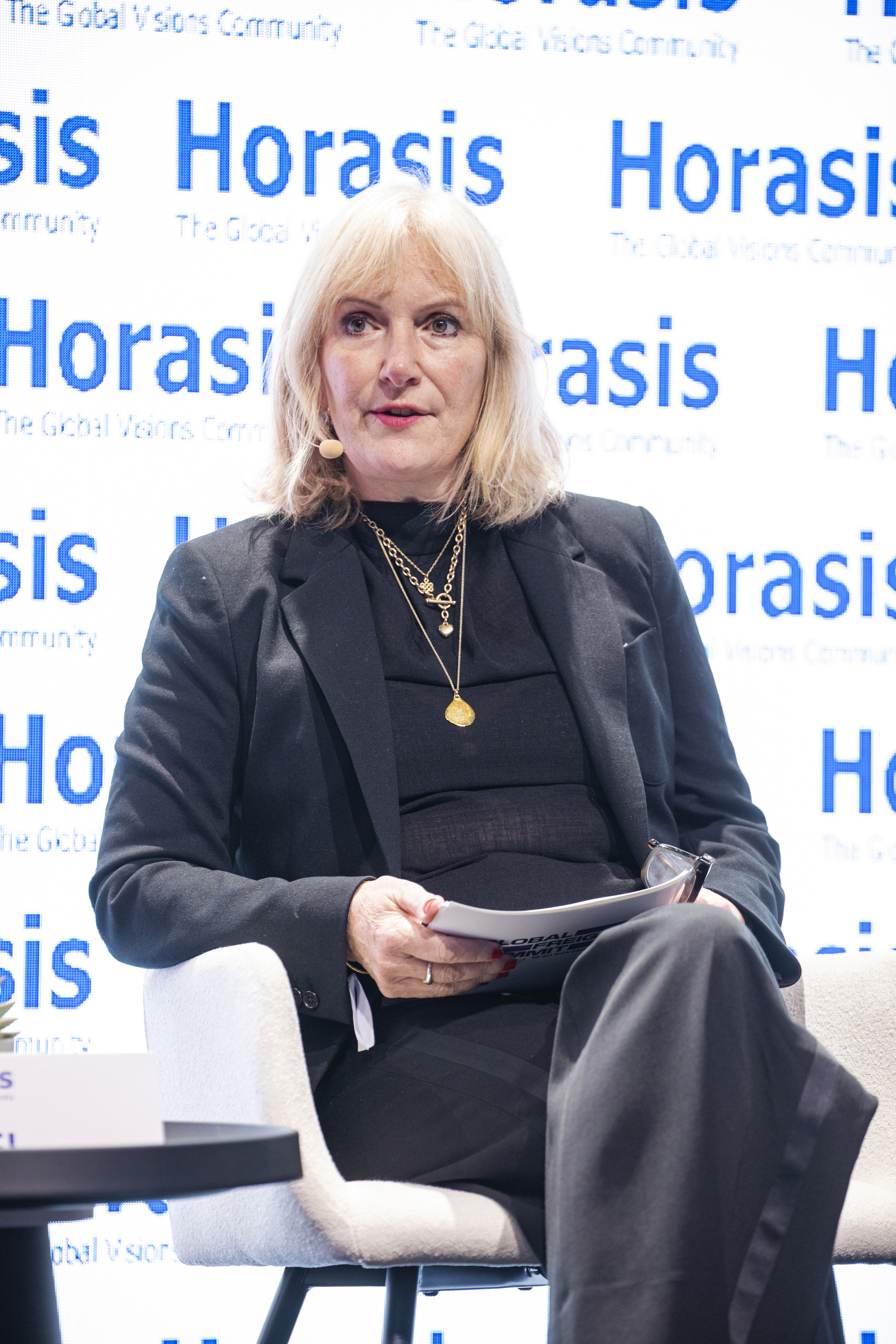
Nadel in 2024

Jennifer Nadel is a British writer and award-winning journalist based in London.

== Life and career ==
Nadel qualified as a barrister and was called to The Bar (Middle Temple) in 1996 before turning to journalism. After a year at the American network ABC News' London bureau she moved to the BBC where she reported for national television and radio. Nadel was a lobby correspondent for the BBC's Parliamentary Unit.

In 1991 Nadel moved to ITV, working first for Channel Four News before becoming ITN's Home Affairs Correspondent in 1991. In this post her special investigations contributed to a number of miscarriages of justice being re-opened and exposed the use of rape as a weapon of war in Bosnia. In 1994, she became ITN's Home Affairs editor heading a bureau of specialist reporters and producers, a post she held until 1999.

In 1997, Nadel's interview with Lord Woolf at the third Woman Lawyer conference led to him conceding consideration of fast track measures for women to address gender imbalances at the bar.

Alongside her journalism career, Nadel has published both novels and non-fiction. Nadel's acclaimed non-fiction book about the Sara Thornton case, Sara Thornton: The Story of a Woman Who Killed, was published in 1993. The book highlighted the ways in which the legal system discriminates against victims of domestic violence and was subsequently adapted into a film, Killing Me Softly, which aired on BBC1 in 1996.

Nadel's first novel, Pretty Thing, was published in 2015. Her writing has appeared in many of the UK's national newspapers.

The Sunday Times bestseller WE : A Manifesto For Women Everywhere, written in collaboration with actress Gillian Anderson, was published by HC in the UK and Atria in the United States, as well as in a number of other countries.

Her most recent book, How Compassion Can Transform Politics, Economy and Society, co-edited with Matt Hawkins and published by Routledge in 2022 is a collection of essays from leading academics and experts across disciplines ranging from philosophy, history, and climate science to criminology, business and politics.

Nadel has contested several elections at local and national level as a candidate for the Green Party. In 2014, she stood in the Bryanston and Dorset Square ward on Westminster City Council, coming seventh (representing the third-placed party after the Conservative and Labour candidates). In the general election of 2015, she stood as a parliamentary candidate for Westminster North, coming fifth. In the 2017 election, she was a candidate in neighbouring Kensington, when she came fourth. In the 2016 London Assembly election, Nadel stood in West Central, finishing in third place.

She is a trustee of the charity Inquest, which supports families whose relatives have died in custody.

== Compassion in Politics ==
In 2018, Nadel moved away from party politics and co-founded the cross-party think tank Compassion in Politics with her colleague Matt Hawkins.

The group launched in October of that year with the stated aim of "putting compassion, cooperation, and empathy at the heart of politics." The group has grown to have the support of over 50 parliamentarians from six parties and of academics and activists including Noam Chomsky, Cerys Matthews, Helen Pankhurst, and Ruby Wax. In 2019 the Guardian described Compassion in Politics as "the movement to be hopeful about."

The campaign divides its work between reforming parliamentary systems so they encourage greater compassion and developing policy proposals built on the value of compassion and inclusion. In relation to the former the group launched a new voluntary code of conduct with More United which has so far been signed by over 100 parliamentarians. During the 2019 general election the group created the #StopTheNastiness pledge which asked candidates to campaign with respect and compassion. Notable signatories included Keir Starmer, Yasmin Qureshi, Caroline Lucas, and Penny Mordaunt. They also founded and launched a new All Party Group for Compassionate Politics Co-Chaired by Debbie Abrahams and Baroness Warsi. In terms of developing policy proposals the group has focused its efforts on a new "Compassion Act" which would make it illegal for future governments to introduce legislation that would push anyone into destitution.

== Global Compassion Coalition ==
In 2022, Nadel was invited to set up the US based, Global Compassion Coalition by the American neuropsychologist, Dr Rick Hanson. The organisation already has a global reach in the millions and the Coalition's supporters include politicians, academics and spiritual leaders including the Dalai Lama. In addition to establishing the organisation alongside Hanson she chairs its 20 plus strong global Board and presents its events program.

Nadel is a regular contributor to the Metro, The Independent and The Huffington Post. She has also written about the campaign in the Guardian and appeared on the Moral Maze, Sky News, 5Live, and BBC Scotland.

== Selected works ==
- — (1993). Sara Thornton : The Story of a Woman who Killed. London: V. Gollancz. ISBN 9780575055810.
- — (2015). Pretty Thing. Little Brown. ISBN 9781472113986.
