= Chak Kalal =

- Village
- Location in Punjab, India Chak Kalal (India)
- Coordinates: 31.1770365°N 75.9587645°E
- Country: India
- State: Punjab
- District: Shaheed Bhagat Singh Nagar

Government
  - Type: Panchayat raj
  - Body: Gram panchayat
- Elevation: 251 m (823 ft)

Population (2011)
  - Total: 874
- Sex ratio 441/433 ♂/♀

Languages
  - Official: Punjabi
- Time zone: UTC+5:30 (IST)
- PIN: 144505
- Telephone code: 01884
- ISO 3166 code: IN-PB
- Post office: Banga
- Website: nawanshahr.nic.in

Chak Kalal also spelled as Chakkalal is a village in Shaheed Bhagat Singh Nagar district of Punjab State, India. It is located 3 kilometres (1.9 mi) away from postal head office Banga, 17 kilometres (11 mi) from Nawanshahr, 12 kilometres (7.5 mi) from district headquarter Shaheed Bhagat Singh Nagar and 108 kilometres (67 mi) from state capital Chandigarh. The village is administrated by Sarpanch an elected representative of the village.

== Demography ==
As of 2011, Chak Kalal has a total number of 176 houses and population of 874 of which 441 include are males while 433 are females according to the report published by Census India in 2011. The literacy rate of Chak Kalal is 83.25%, higher than the state average of 75.84%. The population of children under the age of 6 years is 80 which is 9.15% of total population of Chak Kalal, and child sex ratio is approximately 702 as compared to Punjab state average of 846.

Most of the people are from Schedule Caste which constitutes 78.72% of total population in Chak Kalal. The town does not have any Schedule Tribe population so far.

As per the report published by Census India in 2011, 246 people were engaged in work activities out of the total population of Chak Kalal which includes 224 males and 22 females. According to census survey report 2011, 99.59% workers describe their work as main work and 0.41% workers are involved in Marginal activity providing livelihood for less than 6 months.

== Education ==
The village has a Punjabi language co-ed primary school founded in 1955.

== See also ==
- List of villages in India
