= Norma Hotaling =

American women's-rights and anti-sex-trafficking activist

- Born: July 21, 1951; Palm Beach, Florida
- Died: December 16, 2008 (aged 57); San Francisco, California
- Occupations: Activist, founder of SAGE, former prostitute

1980s: Prostitute and addict in San Francisco	
1989: Turns herself into the police, beginning recovery	
1992: Founds SAGE	
1995: First Offender Prostitution Program/Johns school is founded	
2001: Wins Oprah Angel Network -- Use Your Life Award	...
2008: Dies of pancreatic cancer in San Francisco, California	
2014: SAGE closes	

Norma Hotaling (July 21, 1951 – December 16, 2008) was an American women's-rights and anti-sex trafficking activist. Hotaling was a former prostitute and heroin addict who drew from her personal experiences to create new methods for getting women and men out of prostitution and into what she saw as healthier lifestyles. She founded the San Francisco non-profit SAGE (Standing Against Global Exploitation) in 1992. She championed holistic methods of "treatment" for former sex workers, and her methods because popular worldwide. As part of her own rehabilitation, Hotaling earned a bachelor's degree in health education from San Francisco State University. In San Francisco, she and SAGE became well known for focusing on men's roles in prostitution by establishing the First Offender Prostitution Program or "John" school, to combat and lessen the demand for prostitutes by males. In April 2008, Hotaling was diagnosed with terminal pancreatic cancer and died eight months later. SAGE continued to operate until 2014.

== Early life ==
Hotaling was born in Palm Beach, Florida. Her father died when she was three years old. She and her brother were primarily raised by her mother and grandmother. She was sexually abused around the time of her fifth birthday and sexual abuse continued through all her childhood years which were spent in New York and Florida.

=== Prostitution ===
Although the details of much of Hotaling's first two decades of life are shadowy, what is certain is that she was working as a prostitute by the time she was eighteen. She moved to San Francisco in the 1980s. Hotaling was addicted to heroin and remained an addict for twenty-one years. However, she had a life-saving realization in the 1980s: "I realized that if I stayed in the sex industry, I was going to die. That was clear to me… It was during the time when AIDS was hitting the streets and people were getting infected."

Toward the end of her work in the sex industry, Hotaling was kidnapped, driven to a cemetery in Colma, outside of San Francisco, brutally beaten and sexually assaulted. She was left for dead, and the resulting physical injuries required her to have a metal plate installed inside her skull.

=== Rehabilitation ===
In 1989, Hotaling turned herself into jail and began her recovery process from drug addiction. She credited her choice to the fact that she had a circle of friends and family members who could serve as role models. As Hotaling healed from her addiction and trauma, she worked in San Francisco's jails as a counselor for prostitutes and addicts. It was during her jail work that she made the personal and institutional connections that became vital to founding and building SAGE.

== Activism and community role ==
Hotaling was best known for her anti-trafficking advocacy work. She played an active role in changing rehabilitation treatments for prostitutes locally and internationally. In an oral history interview, a SAGE employee under the pseudonym "Angela" said "Treatment as we know it today exists because of people like Norma. She changed the face of treatment as usual in San Francisco by creating trauma-informed care. This led to 'harm reduction,' which was unheard of when we got together and began talking about an organization which was to become SAGE.”

Hotaling was also known for her advocacy for Hepatitis-C awareness. Because she was infected with Hepatitis-C, she was conscious of the high risk of transmission for former prostitutes. Because intravenous drug usage is common among those involved in prostitution, the danger of Hep-C or HIV transmission is high. SAGE's harm- reduction approach to public health was used to prevent risky behavior, for instance, by offering condoms and bleach (for cleaning needles) to those at risk.

=== Personality ===
She is regarded as able to communicate well with the whole spectrum of society, from inmates and prostitutes to politicians. On one occasion she visited the White House and spoke with President George W. Bush about the conditions of trafficked women. On a local level, she regularly collaborated with the Sheriff's Office, San Francisco Mayor Gavin Newsom and San Francisco District Attorney Kamala Harris.

Hotaling believed that education and training were key factors in the rehabilitation process and undertook the task of replacing prostitution with financially viable, self-affirming employment. Accordingly, she generously enabled a number of employees and members of SAGE to attain bachelor's and master's degrees.

== Founding of SAGE (Standing Against Global Exploitation) ==
SAGE began on a small scale, but the organization ascended to become an internationally recognized agent of change. At its peak, SAGE employed thirty-five to forty full-time employees – most of whom had come to SAGE for treatment. The organization owned its own building on Mission Street. Francine, a SAGE employee, said, “Norma was so proud of SAGE and SAGE’s building at 127 Mission... It was a million-dollar property on Mission Street, three floors, a big building and she would say proudly 'Look, a building owned and run by a prostitute.'"

SAGE was regarded as a model program, and its mission was emulated by other agencies worldwide. Hotaling worked with groups in France, India, South Korea and other countries who requested her help in established their own rehabilitation programs. One SAGE's greatest attributes was that it was run by survivors of prostitution and trauma who offered peer counseling and other direct help to survivors.

=== Approach to rehabilitation ===
Most of the treatment programs at SAGE involved therapy so that survivors could work on past emotional trauma with a person who was not afraid of listening to stories of pain and abuse. SAGE employee Angela said: “When we created SAGE, drug treatment had been based on the Synanon model ... They would shave your head and make you wear diapers and dunce caps and signs ... They might have given you a therapist if you were suicidal, but other than that, forget about it... [But] SAGE took a holistic approach to treatment and recovery, and in addition to various conventional therapies, it offered treatment approaches that were considered outside-of-the box: vitamins, bodywork, Chinese medicine, acupuncture, therapy groups, and nourishing food." According to Hotaling,"There never was the word “survivor” applied to sex workers before SAGE ... Former SAGE employee Francine (under pseudonym) added, "It was a process of learning that we had been victims and that now we were survivors. We needed to first identify that we were victims and that it was maybe not our fault and then be able to each share our personal story and see that we survived all that.”

SAGE was an innovative organization. It was the first to use a holistic approach to rehabilitate its clients, and most importantly, Hotaling insisted that “survivors of the sex industry are going to be the leaders.” By establishing the "John" school in San Francisco, SAGE was also one of the first organizations to seriously address the way in which men fuel demand within the sex trade, and to point out that if the demand side for prostitution could be made to decrease, the supply side would decrease as well. "There never was an analysis about the demand that is created by men; the focus was always on the woman – just get the women off the street. Nobody knew how to talk about the men.”

The work environment at SAGE was conducive to recovery, as Hotaling believed that employee participation in self-care was crucial for healing the many different types of trauma which clients and staff may have experienced. SAGE employee Francine (under pseudonym) said: "Over the years there were hundreds of women who came to SAGE who had prostitution issues, criminal justice issues, and substance abuse problems. I would guess at least eighty percent had been sexually abused as children. Norma very much encouraged clients and staff and she would ask: what do you do to take care of yourself? Hotaling set it up that if you were at work and there was an acupuncture session going on, you could go sit in on the group session. You could also get personal session, but not on company time. She encouraged massage, medical care—all those things were considered important to Norma. Every Friday was a staff meeting and that was important because it was a time when all of us got together to share. Working at SAGE was unique because at most jobs you can’t do those kinds of things.”

=== Community building ===
SAGE contributed to the health and life of San Francisco community in many ways. SAGE employee Angela (under pseudonym) observed, “SAGE saves the community a ton of money—money that would that otherwise be spent in jail days, spent on a hospital bed, spent on emergency room visits, spent on foster care and a whole bundle of services for children whose mothers were not able to get into a good program and get clean, stay clean, and care for their kids themselves.”

=== Death and afterward ===
Hotaling was diagnosed with late-stage pancreatic cancer in April 2008. She chose not to participate in chemotherapy, opting instead for alternative treatments. She conducted one oral history interview with Luis Enrique Bazan following her diagnosis. She died at the age of 57 on December 16, 2008.

Hotaling's death led to significant changes in the community and recovery programs at SAGE. There was a loss of community spirit, Friday-morning meetings and other valued traditions disintegrated. SAGE employee Diana (under pseudonym) said “SAGE was never the same after Norma died. It was never, ever, ever the same. SAGE was like a family. It was more than a place to work, especially to those who were in recovery, which included just about everybody in the building ... What began as 90% survivor-run program became a 60/40 ratio of peer/survivor counselors to professional counselors.”

Honors, decorations, awards and distinctions

In 1998, SAGE's First Offender Prostitution Program/John school won the Innovations in American Government Award from the John F. Kennedy School of Government at Harvard University.

In 2000, SAGE's Peer Educator Training Program won the Peter F. Drucker Award for Non-Profit Innovation through the Ford Foundation.

In 2001, SAGE and Hotaling won the Use Your Life Award from Oprah's Angel Network.

== Published works ==
Hotaling, Norma. “San Francisco’s Successful Strategies: Prevention Services for Girls and the First Offender Prostitution Program.” San Francisco's Successful Strategies, Purdue University, 2001, www.purdue.edu/hhs/hdfs/fii/wp-content/uploads/2015/06/s_mifis06c08.pdf.

== Bibliography ==
- Nieves, Evelyn. “For Patrons of Prostitutes, Remedial Instruction.” The New York Times, The New York Times, 17 Mar. 1999, www.nytimes.com/1999/03/18/us/for-patrons-of-prostitutes-remedial-instruction.html.
- Writer, Meredith May. “Norma Hotaling Dies – Fought Prostitution.” SFGate, San Francisco Chronicle, 20 Dec. 2008, www.sfgate.com/bayarea/article/Norma-Hotaling-dies-fought-prostitution-3180057.php.
- Bindel, Julie. “Obituary: Norma Hotaling.” The Guardian, Guardian News and Media, 2 Jan. 2009, www.theguardian.com/society/2009/jan/03/norma-hotaling-obituary.
- “Norma Hotaling.” Prostitution Research & Education, 24 May 2013, prostitutionresearch.com/2008/12/19/norma-hotaling/.
