= Sara Thornton case =

British legal case

Sara Thornton
- Born: 12 January 1955 (age 71); Nuneaton
- Known for: Conviction of murder of husband being overturned on appeal

Sara Thornton is a British woman who was sentenced to life imprisonment after being convicted of the 1989 murder of her violent and alcoholic husband, Malcolm Thornton. Thornton never denied the killing, but claimed it had been an accident during an argument. The prosecution at her trial argued that she had carried out the act for financial gain, and she was found guilty of murder.

The case became a cause célèbre among women's groups, and ignited a political debate on how the courts should deal with the issue of domestic violence. At a retrial in 1996 Thornton was found guilty of the lesser charge of manslaughter and freed from custody.

== The case ==
Malcolm Thornton died in hospital after he was stabbed at the home that he shared with his wife Sara on 12 June 1989 following an argument. At her trial in 1990, Sara Thornton pleaded guilty to manslaughter due to reasons of diminished responsibility, claiming that she had stabbed Malcolm accidentally following a row as he lay drunk on the sofa. The court heard that the police had been called to the house in Atherstone, Warwickshire, on several occasions when she was being assaulted by her husband.

A representative from Alcoholics Anonymous saw Malcolm punch his wife on one occasion, while a neighbour spoke of how Sara Thornton had been beaten "black and blue" to the point where she became unconscious and required hospital treatment. The prosecution claimed that Sara was a "pathological liar" who had carried out the killing for financial gain. A jury convicted her of murder. Sentencing her to life imprisonment, the judge told Thornton that she could have walked out of the house or gone upstairs.

Thornton appealed the conviction, but it was rejected in 1991. The original trial had been largely ignored by the media. Thornton's case was taken up by Justice for Women, who were pressing for a change in the way cases of domestic violence are dealt with by the courts. The group, founded by Harriet Wistrich and Julie Bindel, began life as the "Free Sara Thornton campaign".

Following the high-profile campaign, Thornton was eventually granted leave to appeal. At a hearing at the Court of Appeal in December 1995, lawyers argued she was a victim of "battered woman syndrome" as a result of her husband's repeated violence, something which had resulted in her losing control and killing him. Her murder conviction was quashed, and a retrial ordered for the following year.

Thornton faced her second trial in May 1996, and the twelve-day hearing took place at Oxford Crown Court. The prosecution presented evidence that Thornton had talked of killing her husband to a colleague. Psychiatrists successfully argued that Thornton suffered from dissociation, a phenomenon where a person can feel disconnected from their surroundings and from their emotional and physical experiences. She was convicted of manslaughter, and sentenced to five years imprisonment. She was released from custody as a result of time already served. Speaking shortly afterwards, Thornton said that she believed her sentence was fair. "I am not saying that every woman should be sent to prison, but for me it was fair. I took a life at the end of the day."

Despite the high-profile campaign, the verdict at Thornton's trial did little to resolve the issue of how the courts should deal with such cases. In 2008, the Labour Government of Gordon Brown put forward proposals to look at the issue as part of a planned reform of the laws governing murder.

== Cultural impact ==
Jennifer Nadel's non-fiction book about the case, Sara Thornton: The Story of a Woman Who Killed (1993), highlighted the ways in which the legal system discriminates against victims of domestic violence. Nadel's book was subsequently adapted into the film, Killing Me Softly (1996), which aired on BBC1 within six weeks of Thornton's release in July 1996. The drama, written by Rebecca Frayn and starring Maggie O'Neill and Peter Howitt, appeared under the Screen One strand.

The case inspired the song "Woke Up This Morning" by the British band Alabama 3. The song was later adopted as the theme song to The Sopranos.

A collection of letters Thornton exchanged with George Delf during her time in prison was published shortly after her release. The book, titled Love on the Wing, Letters of hope from prison, was published by Penguin Books in June 1996.
