= Eaves Housing for Women =

British charitable organisation

- Founded: 1977
- Dissolved: October 2015
- VAT ID no.: Registered company no 1322750
- Registration no.: Charity number 275048
- Purpose: Violence against women, Trafficking, sexual violence, Prostitution, domestic violence, Women
- Location: Unit 2.03 Canterbury Court, 1-3 Brixton Road, London
- Coordinates: 51°28′51″N 0°06′38″W
- Origins: Founded as Homeless Action and Accommodation
- Region served: England and Wales
- Method: research, lobbying, Accommodation, advocacy
- Revenue: £5,382,778
- Employees: 48
- Volunteers: 30
- Website: eavesforwomen.org.uk

Eaves Housing for Women (or simply Eaves) was a British charitable company based in London. It provided support to vulnerable women, including female victims of domestic violence, sex trafficking, or domestic servitude, and campaigned against prostitution. The organisation also conducted research and lobbying.

Eaves was the umbrella organisation for a number of projects, including: "The Poppy Project", "The Scarlet Centre", "The Serafina Project", and "The Lilith Project".

The charity closed in October 2015.

== History ==
Eaves was founded in 1977 as "Homeless Action and Accommodation".

== Objectives ==
Eaves had three main objectives: to provide accommodation, support, and advice to women and children fleeing domestic violence, prostitution, domestic servitude, and sexual violence. Secondly, the charity lobbied and responded to relevant government papers. Finally, it conducted research into prostitution, trafficking, and domestic violence. In the longer term, the aim of the organisation was "to be recognised as one of the leading agencies on violence against women issues in the country".

== The Poppy Project ==
In 2003, Eaves received government funding for a service to assist women trafficked for sex and domestic servitude; it was called the POPPY Project and based in London. It was the only UK Government-funded dedicated service for trafficked women. The POPPY Project provided accommodation and support services such as legal advice for the women it housed, and also outreach services for others. In its first six years, it housed 215 women and helped a further 208. The project was committed to ending all prostitution on the grounds that it "helps to construct and maintain gender inequality".

In April 2011, it was announced that Eaves had lost its central government funding for the POPPY project, with the contract for helping victims of trafficking going to the Salvation Army instead. The reason given by government for the change of service provider was that the Salvation Army was able to offer "victims a more diverse range of services". Former Labour Party MP Vera Baird criticised the decision, suggesting that women would not seek help from "uniformed male Christians".

== Lilith Research and Development ==
Eaves' subsidiary "The Lilith Project" campaigned to stop violence against women, studying issues such as lap dancing. A 2003 study of lap dancing and stripteases in the London Borough of Camden by the organisation linked the opening of new lap dancing venues with an increase in reported rapes, and stated that reported rapes near to lap dancing venues were three times the national average. The study and its conclusions were widely quoted by opponents of lap dancing venues. Other researchers, including Dr. Brooke Magnanti, asserted that the Lilith study was "flawed", and Magnati published a study that concluded that there is no "causal relationship" between such venues and an increase in sex attacks.

== Funding ==
Eaves Housing for Women received funding from a variety of sources, including the Home Office, London Councils, and a number of local authorities In 2010, it had an income of over £5 million.
