= Journal of Aggression, Maltreatment & Trauma =

- Discipline: Clinical psychology
- Language: English
- Edited by: Robert Geffner

Publication details
- Former names: Journal of Psychological Trauma; Journal of Trauma Practice; Journal of Emotional Abuse
- History: 1997–present
- Publisher: Taylor & Francis
- Frequency: 10/year

Standard abbreviations
- ISO 4: J. Aggress. Maltreatment Trauma

Indexing
- CODEN: JAMTFJ
- ISSN: 1092-6771 (print); 1545-083X (web)
- LCCN: 97658627
- OCLC no.: 36347672

Links
- Journal homepage; Online access; Online archive

Journal of Aggression, Maltreatment & Trauma is a peer-reviewed academic journal that is published ten times per year and covers relevant topic areas and also publishes thematic issues featuring guest editors. It incorporates the Journal of Psychological Trauma, which was published from 2002 until 2008 (known as Journal of Trauma Practice until 2007) and the Journal of Emotional Abuse, which was published from 1997 until 2008. The journal is published by Taylor & Francis and its editor-in-chief is Robert Geffner (Alliant International University).

== Abstracting and indexing ==
The journal is abstracted and indexed in Published International Literature on Traumatic Stress and PsycINFO.
