= Murder in United States law =

In the United States, the law for murder varies by jurisdiction. In many US jurisdictions there is a hierarchy of acts, known collectively as homicide. Of which first-degree murder and felony murder are the most serious, followed by second-degree murder and, in a few states, third-degree murder. In some states they are divided into voluntary manslaughter, and involuntary manslaughter; such as reckless homicide and negligent homicide, which are the least serious. There is also justifiable homicide, which is not a crime. However, because there are at least 52 relevant jurisdictions, each with its own criminal code, this is a considerable simplification.

Sentencing varies widely depending upon the specific murder charge. "Life imprisonment" is a common penalty for first-degree murder, but its meaning varies widely. Capital punishment is a legal sentence in 27 states, and in the federal civilian and military legal systems, though eight of these states have indefinitely suspended the practice. The United States is unusual in actually performing executions, with 34 states having performed executions since capital punishment was reinstated in 1976. The methods of execution have varied, but the most common method since 1976 has been lethal injection. In 2019 a total of 22 people were executed, and 2,652 people were on death row. The federal Unborn Victims of Violence Act, enacted in 2004 and codified at 18 U.S. Code § 1841, allows for a fetus to be treated as a victim in a crime. Subsection (c) of that statute specifically prohibits prosecutions related to consented abortions and medical treatments.

== Jurisdiction ==
If murder is committed within the borders of a state, that state has jurisdiction, and in a similar way, if the crime is committed in the District of Columbia, the D.C. Superior Court (the equivalent of a state court in the District) retains jurisdiction, though in some cases involving U.S. government property or personnel, the federal courts may have exclusive jurisdiction. If the victim is a federal official, an ambassador, consul, or other foreign official under the protection of the United States, or if the crime took place on federal property or involved crossing state borders, or in a manner that substantially affects interstate commerce or national security, then the federal government also has jurisdiction. If a crime is not committed within any state, then federal jurisdiction is exclusive, for example vessels of the U.S. Navy or the U.S. Merchant Marine in international waters and U.S. military bases worldwide. Recently, the Supreme Court, in the McGirt decision, reaffirmed that major crimes within the reservation boundaries of Native American tribes, for which a tribal member is suspected, must be investigated and prosecuted by the federal, not state, government. Federal penalties will apply if found guilty.

In addition, murder by a member of the United States Armed Forces of a prisoner while under custody of the United States Armed Forces is in violation of Article 118 of the Uniform Code of Military Justice and can result in the perpetrator being tried by a general court-martial, subjecting to certain types of jurisdictions within its own borders or with foreign nations. Jurisdiction over the crime of murder can be complex as a result of the principle of "dual sovereignty" that is part of federalism. In cases where a murder involves both state and federal jurisdiction, the offender can be tried and punished separately for each crime without raising issues of double jeopardy, unless the court believes that the new prosecution is merely a "sham" forwarded by the prior prosecutor. In the United States there is no statute of limitations on the crime of murder.

== Degrees ==
The first division of the general crime of murder into graded subcategories (first degree being the worst) was enacted into the Law of Pennsylvania in 1794. This enactment is often explained in terms of a desire to narrow the scope of application of capital punishment in that state and in the other states which subsequently graded murder into "first" and "second" degrees. The English common law, which had been received into the laws of the U.S. states, at the time applied capital punishment to a large number of crimes; as a result, states statutorily divided the crime of murder into first and second degrees, and began applying capital punishment only to criminals convicted of first-degree murder. By 1953, three states—namely Florida, Minnesota, and Wisconsin—had further created the subcategory of third-degree murder. States have adopted several different systems for classifying murders by degree. The most common separates murder into two degrees (first- and second-degree murder), and treats voluntary and involuntary manslaughter as separate crimes that do not constitute murder, instead of third-degree murder.

First-degree murder
Any intentional killing that is willful and premeditated with malice aforethought. Felony murder, a charge that may be filed against a defendant who is involved in a dangerous crime in which a death results, is typically first-degree, but may also be second-degree.
Second-degree murder
Any intentional killing that is not premeditated or planned. A situation in which the killer intends only to inflict serious bodily harm, knowing this could result in death but with no specific intent to kill, constitutes depraved-heart murder, which can be considered as second-degree murder.
Voluntary manslaughter
Sometimes called a crime of passion murder and informally called third-degree murder, this is any intentional killing that involves no prior intent to kill and which was committed under such circumstances that would "cause a reasonable person to become emotionally or mentally disturbed". Both this and second-degree murder are committed on the spot under a spur-of-the-moment choice, but the two differ in the magnitude of the circumstances surrounding the crime. For example, a bar fight that results in death would ordinarily constitute second-degree murder. If that same bar fight stemmed from a discovery of infidelity, however, it may be voluntary manslaughter.
Involuntary manslaughter
A killing that stems from a lack of intention to cause death but involving an intentional act of negligence, which may or may not be premeditated, leading to death. A drunk driving-related death is typically involuntary manslaughter (see also vehicular homicide, causing death by dangerous driving, gross negligence manslaughter, and causing death by criminal negligence for international equivalents). Note that the "unintentional" element here refers to the lack of intent to bring about the death. The crimes of first degree murder, second degree murder and voluntary manslaughter mentioned above feature an intent to kill, whereas involuntary manslaughter is "unintentional", because the killer did not intend for a death to result from their intentional actions. If there is a presence of intention it relates only to the intent to cause a violent act which brings about the death, but not an intention to bring about the death itself. However, there are exceptions, such as felony murder and depraved-heart murder, the latter of which can be considered as voluntary manslaughter or second-degree murder, instead of involuntary manslaughter, despite the lack of explicit intention to kill.

The Model Penal Code classifies homicides differently, without degrees. Under it, murder is any killing committed purposely and knowingly, even if it is a crime of passion murder without malice aforethought, manslaughter is any killing committed as a result of recklessness (also known as depraved-heart murder), and negligent homicide is any killing resulting from negligence. Some states classify murders differently. In Pennsylvania, first-degree murder encompasses premeditated murders, second-degree murder encompasses accomplice liability, and third-degree serves as a catch-all for other murders. In New York, first-degree murder involves "special circumstances", such as the murder of a police officer or witness to a crime, multiple murders, or murders involving torture. Under this system, second-degree murder is any other premeditated murder. The New York statutes also recognize "murder for hire" as first-degree murder. Texas uses a scheme similar to New York's, but refers to first-degree murder as "capital murder", a term which typically applies only to those crimes that merit the death penalty. Some states, such as Florida, do not separate the two kinds of manslaughter.

Degrees of murder in U.S. states and territories
Jurisdiction	1st degree	2nd degree	3rd degree	Other named categories	Source
Federal	Yes	Yes	No	No	
Alabama	No	No	Yes	Murder (Note: AL Code § 13A-6-2.)	
Alaska	Yes (Note: AK Statutes § 11.41.100. Murder in the first degree.)	Yes (Note: AK Statutes § 11.41.110. Murder in the second degree.)	No	No	
American Samoa	Yes (Note: AS Code § 46.3502. Murder in the 1st degree.)	Yes (Note: AS Code § 46.3503. Murder in the 2nd degree.)	No	No	
Arizona	Yes (Note: AZ Rev Stat § 13-1105. First-degree murder. Classification.)	Yes (Note: AZ Rev Stat § 13-1104. Second-degree murder. Classification.)	No	No	
Arkansas	Yes (Note: AR Code § 5-10-102. Murder in the first degree.)	Yes (Note: AR Code § 5-10-103. Murder in the second degree.)	No	Capital murder (Note: AR Code § 5-10-103. Capital murder.)	
California	Yes (Note: CA Penal Code § 189.)	Yes	No	No	
Colorado	Yes (Note: CO Rev Stat § 18-3-102. Murder in the first degree.)	Yes (Note: CO Rev Stat § 18-3-103. Murder in the second degree.)	No	No	
Connecticut	No	No	No	Murder, (Note: CT Gen Stat § 53a-54a. Murder.) Murder with special circumstances, (Note: CT Gen Stat § 53a-54b. Murder with special circumstances.) Felony murder, (Note: CT Gen Stat § 53a-54c. Felony murder.) Arson murder (Note: CT Gen Stat § 53a-54d. Arson murder.)	
Delaware	Yes (Note: DE Code § 634 Murder by abuse or neglect in the first degree; class A felony; § 636 Murder in the first degree; class A felony.)	Yes (Note: DE Code § 633 Murder by abuse or neglect in the second degree; class B felony; § 635 Murder in the second degree; class A felony.)	No	No	
District of Columbia	Yes (Note: DC Code § 22–2101. Murder in the first degree — Purposeful killing; killing while perpetrating certain crimes; § 22–2102. Murder in the first degree — Placing obstructions upon or displacement of railroads.)	Yes (Note: DC Code § 22–2103. Murder in the second degree.)	No	No	
Florida	Yes (Note: FL Statutes § 782.04(1)(a))	Yes (Note: FL Statutes § 782.04(2))	Yes (Note: FL Statutes § 782.04(4))	No	
Georgia	No	Yes (Note: GA Code § 16-5-1. Murder in the second degree)	No	Murder, Felony murder (Note: GA Code § 16-5-1. Murder; felony murder.)	
Guam	No	No	No	Murder, (Note: GU Code § 16.40. Murder Defined.) Aggravated murder (Note: GU Code § 16.30. Aggravated Murder Defined.)	
Hawaii	Yes (Note: HI Rev Stat § 707-701. Murder in the first degree.)	Yes (Note: HI Rev Stat § 707-701.5. Murder in the second degree.)	No	No	
Idaho	Yes (Note: ID Statutes § 18-4003. Degrees of murder.)	Yes	No	No	
Illinois	Yes (Note: Sec. 9-1. First-degree Murder - Death penalties – Exceptions – Separate Hearings – Proof – Findings – Appellate procedures – Reversals.)	Yes (Note: Sec. 9-2. Second-degree murder.)	No	No	
Indiana	No	No	No	Murder (Note: IN Code § 35-42-1-1. Murder.)	
Iowa	Yes (Note: IA Code § 707.2. Murder in the first degree.)	Yes (Note: IA Code § 707.3. Murder in the second degree.)	No	No	
Kansas	Yes (Note: KS Stat §21-5402. Murder in the first degree.)	Yes (Note: KS Statutes §21-5401. Murder in the second degree.)	No	Capital murder (Note: KS Stat §21-5401. Capital murder.)	
Kentucky	No	No	No	Murder (Note: KY Rev Stat § 507.020 (2017). Murder.)	
Louisiana	Yes (Note: LA Rev Stat § 30. First degree murder.)	Yes (Note: LA Rev Stat § 30.1. Second degree murder.)	No	No	
Maine	No	No	No	Murder, (Note: 17-A ME Rev Stat §201. Murder.) Felony murder (Note: 17-A ME Rev Stat §202. Felony murder.)	
Maryland	Yes (Note: MD Code § 2-201. Murder in the first degree)	Yes (Note: MD Code § 2-204. Murder in the second degree (Amendment effective October 1, 2017.))	No	No	
Massachusetts	Yes	Yes	No	No	
Michigan	Yes (Note: MI Compiled Laws § 750.316 First degree murder; penalty; definitions.)	Yes (Note: MI Compiled Laws § 750.317 Second degree murder; penalty.)	No	No	
Minnesota	Yes (Note: MN Statutes § 609.185. Murder in the first degree.)	Yes (Note: MN Statutes § 609.19 Murder in the second degree.)	Yes (Note: MN Statutes § 609.195 Murder in the third degree.)	No	
Mississippi	Yes (Note: MS Code § 97-3-19(1)(a), (1)(c), (1)(d).)	Yes (Note: MS Code § 97-3-19(1)(b).)	No	Capital murder (Note: MS Code § 97-3-19(2).)	
Missouri	Yes (Note: MO Rev Stat § 565.020 (2016). First degree murder, penalty — person under eighteen years of age, penalty.)	Yes (Note: MO Rev Stat § 565.021 (2016). Second degree murder, penalty.)	No	No	
Montana	No	No	No	Deliberate homicide, (Note: MT Code § 45-5-102 (2017). Deliberate homicide.) Mitigated deliberate homicide (Note: MT Code § 45-5-103 (2017). Mitigated deliberate homicide.)	
Nebraska	Yes (Note: NE Rev Stat § 28-303 (2017). Murder in the first degree; penalty.)	Yes (Note: NE Rev Stat § 28-304 (2017). Murder in the second degree; penalty.)	No	No	
Nevada	Yes (Note: NV Rev Stat § 200.030. Degrees of murder; penalties.)	Yes	No	No	
New Hampshire	Yes (Note: NH Statutes § 630:1-a. First Degree Murder.)	Yes (Note: NH Statutes § 630:1-b. Second Degree Murder.)	No	Capital murder (Note: NH Statutes § 630:1. Capital Murder.)	
New Jersey	No	No	No	Murder (Note: NJ Statutes § 2C:11-3. Murder.)	
New Mexico	Yes (Note: NM Statutes § 30-2-1(A).)	Yes (Note: NM Statutes § 30-2-1(B).)	No	No	
New York	Yes (Note: NY PEN § 125.27. Murder in the first degree.)	Yes (Note: NY PEN § 125.25. Murder in the second degree.)	No	Aggravated murder (Note: NY PEN § 125.26. Aggravated murder.)	
North Carolina	Yes (Note: NC Gen Stat § 14-17. Murder in the first and second degree defined; punishment.)	Yes	No	Murder of an unborn child (Note: NC Gen Stat § 14-23.2. Murder of an unborn child; penalty.)	
North Dakota	No	No	No	Murder (Note: ND Code § 12.1-16-01. Murder.)	
Northern Mariana Islands	Yes (Note: MP Code § 1101(a). First Degree Murder.)	Yes (Note: MP Code § 1101(b). Second Degree Murder.)	No	No	
Ohio	No	No	No	Murder, (Note: OH Revised Code § 2903.02.) Aggravated murder (Note: OH Revised Code § 2903.01.)	
Oklahoma	Yes (Note: OK Stat § 21-701.7. Murder in the first degree.)	Yes (Note: OK Stat § 21-701.8. Murder in the second degree.)	No	No	
Oregon	Yes	Yes	No	Aggravated murder	
Pennsylvania	Yes (Note: 18 PA Cons Stat § 2502(a). Murder of the first degree.)	Yes (Note: 18 PA Cons Stat § 2502(b). Murder of the first degree.)	Yes (Note: 18 PA Cons Stat § 2502(c). Murder of the first degree.)	No	
Puerto Rico	Yes (Note: P.R. Laws tit. 33, § 4734)	Yes (Note: P.R. Laws tit. 33, § 4734)	No	No	
Rhode Island	Yes (Note: RI Gen L § 11-23-1 (2013). Murder.)	Yes	No	No	
South Carolina	No	No	No	Murder (Note: SC Code § 16-3-10.)	
South Dakota	Yes (Note: SD Codified Laws § 22-16-4. Homicide as murder in the first degree.)	Yes (Note: SD Codified Laws § 22-16-7. Homicide as murder in the second degree.)	No	No	
Tennessee	Yes (Note: TN Code § 39-13-202. First degree murder.)	Yes (Note: TN Code § 39-13-202. Second degree murder.)	No	No	
Texas	No	No	No	Murder, (Note: TX Penal Code § 19.02. Murder.) Capital murder (Note: TX Penal Code § 19.03. Capital Murder.)	
U.S. Virgin Islands					
Utah	No	No	No	Murder, (Note: UT Criminal Code § 203. Murder.) Aggravated murder (Note: UT Criminal Code § 202. Aggravated murder.)	
Vermont	Yes (Note: VT Statutes § 2301. Murder-Degrees defined.)	Yes	No	No	
Virginia	Yes (Note: VA Code § 18.2-32. First and second degree murder defined; punishment)	Yes	No	Capital murder (Note: VA Code § 18.2-31. Capital murder defined; punishment.)	
Washington	Yes (Note: WA Rev Code § 9A.32.030. Murder in the first degree)	Yes (Note: WA Rev Code § 9A.32.050. Murder in the second degree)	No	No	
West Virginia	Yes (Note: WV Code § 61-2-1. First and second degree murder defined; allegations in indictment for homicide.)	Yes	No	No	
Wisconsin	No	No	No	First-degree intentional homicide, (Note: WI Stat § 940.01. First-degree intentional homicide.) first-degree reckless homicide, (Note: WI Stat § 940.02. First-degree reckless homicide.) felony murder (Note: WI Stat § 940.03. Felony murder.)	
Wyoming	Yes (Note: WY Code § 6-2-101. Murder in the first degree; penalty.)	Yes (Note: WY Code § 6-2-104. Murder in the second degree; penalty.)	No	No	

== Fetal killing ==
Fetal homicide laws in the United States "Homicide" or "murder" Other crime against fetus Depends on age of fetus Assaulting mother No law on feticide

Under the common law, an assault on a pregnant woman resulting in a stillbirth was not considered murder. Remedies were limited to criminal penalties for the assault on the mother and tort action for loss of the anticipated economic services of the lost child, for emotional pain and suffering, or both. With the widespread adoption of laws protecting unborn life, the assailant could be charged with that offense, but the penalty was often only a fine and a few days in jail. A number of states have passed "fetal homicide" laws, making killing of a fetus murder; the laws differ about the stage of development at which the fetus is protected.

After several well-publicized cases, Congress in 2004 passed the Unborn Victims of Violence Act, which specifically criminalizes harming a fetus, with the same penalties as for a similar attack upon a born human being, when the attack would be a federal offense. Most such attacks fall under state laws; for instance, Scott Peterson was convicted of killing his unborn son as well as his wife under California's pre-existing fetal homicide law.

== Sentencing guidelines ==
=== Arizona ===
In Arizona, a person is charged with murder when the offender knowingly and intentionally causes the death of a person or unborn child. First-degree murder must be premeditated. In the state of Arizona, if one is found guilty of first-degree murder, there is the possibility of receiving the death penalty, life without the possibility of parole, or life.

=== California ===
If a person is convicted of first-degree murder in California, that person may face a sentence of life in prison without the possibility of parole, or the death penalty. At minimum, they will face a sentence of 25 years-to-life in prison, and thus must serve at least 25 years before being eligible for parole. The punishment for the crime of first-degree murder in California is upgraded to a minimum of life imprisonment without the possibility of parole or execution of the murderer in at least the following circumstances:

- The murder was intentional and carried out for financial gain
- Previous conviction of a murder
- The murder was committed by means of a bomb, destructive device, or poison
- The victim was a judge, prosecutor, fireman, policeman, juror, or witness
- The murder was intentional and involved the infliction of torture
- The murder was committed while the defendant was engaged in, or was an accomplice in, the commission of, attempted commission of, or the immediate flight after committing, or attempting to commit... [various other violent or sexual felonies]
- The murder was intentional and perpetrated by means of discharging a firearm from a motor vehicle, intentionally at another person or persons outside the vehicle with the intent to inflict death
- The defendant intentionally killed the victim by means of lying in wait.
- The victim was intentionally killed because of their race, color, religion, nationality, or country of origin.
- The murder was committed for the purpose of avoiding or preventing a lawful arrest, or perfecting or attempting to perfect, an escape from lawful custody.
- The defendant intentionally killed the victim while the defendant was an active participant in a criminal street gang, as defined in subdivision (f) of Section 186.22, and the murder was carried out to further the activities of the criminal street gang.

A person convicted of second-degree murder in California will face a sentence of 15 years-to-life in prison, and thus must serve at least 15 years in prison before being eligible for parole. Punishments are increased if the murder victim was a police officer, or was killed during a drive-by shooting. If a gun was used during the murder, the punishment will include an additional 10, 20, or 25 years to life prison sentence. Those convicted will also receive a strike on their criminal record, and fines of up to $10,000. They will also have to pay restitution to victims, and will no longer be allowed to own a gun.

=== Florida ===
In Florida, a person is guilty of first-degree murder when it is perpetrated from a premeditated design to result in the death of a human being. A person is also guilty of first-degree murder if they cause the death of any individual during the commission of a predicate felony regardless of actual intent or premeditation. This is called felony murder. This offense is categorized as capital offense, so if convicted, the offender could possibly receive the death penalty. Second-degree murder is depraved-heart murder; third-degree murder is felony murder where the underlying felony is not one of the enumerated felonies falling under first-degree felony murder.

The exact statutory definition of third-degree murder is "[t]he unlawful killing of a human being, when perpetrated without any design to effect death, by a person engaged in the perpetration of, or in the attempt to perpetrate, any felony other than" nineteen enumerated categories of felonies. It constitutes a second-degree felony. Second-degree felonies are punishable by a maximum of 15 years' imprisonment ordinarily, a maximum of 30 years for a habitual felony offender, or 30 to 40 years for a violent career criminal.

The nineteen enumerated categories of felonies falling under first-degree murder rather than third-degree murder are drug trafficking; arson; sexual battery; robbery; burglary; kidnapping; prison escape; aggravated child abuse; aggravated abuse of an elderly person or disabled adult; aircraft piracy; unlawful distribution of cocaine, opium, or other controlled substances when such drug is proven to be the proximate cause of the death of the user; carjacking; home-invasion robbery; aggravated stalking; murder of another human being; unlawful throwing, placing, or discharging of a destructive device or bomb; aggravated fleeing or eluding with serious bodily injury or death; resisting an officer with violence to his or her person; or terrorism or an act in furtherance of terrorism.

=== Hawaii ===
The state of Hawaii has no death penalty. If they are found guilty, the maximum penalty is life imprisonment without the possibility of parole. A first-degree murder involves one or more specific elements:

- Multiple victims killed
- A public safety official, such as a police officer, firefighter, or paramedic/EMT killed
- A judge or prosecutor killed (in connection with their respective duties)
- A witness in a criminal case killed (in connection with the person being a witness)
- Murder committed for hire (with the charge applying to both the murderer and the person who paid the murderer)
- Murder committed by an imprisoned person
- Murder committed under organized crime (refer to RICO act)

=== Louisiana ===
Louisiana states homicide in the third-degree is manslaughter. There are other specific guidelines, for example, the killing of a police officer or firefighter is an automatic first-degree charge, and intent to kill more than one person is automatically a first-degree charge. In the state of Louisiana convicted murderers can receive life imprisonment or the death penalty.

=== Michigan ===
In Michigan, a person is found guilty of first-degree murder when murder is perpetrated by means of poison, lying in wait, or any other willful, deliberate, and premeditated killing. In Michigan, the top penalty the perpetrator can receive is life imprisonment.

=== Minnesota ===
Minnesota law originally defined third-degree murder solely as depraved-heart murder ("without intent to effect the death of any person, caus[ing] the death of another by perpetrating an act eminently dangerous to others and evincing a depraved mind, without regard for human life"). In 1987, an additional drug-related provision ("without intent to cause death, proximately caus[ing] the death of a human being by, directly or indirectly, unlawfully selling, giving away, bartering, delivering, exchanging, distributing, or administering a controlled substance classified in Schedule I or II") was added to the definition of third-degree murder. Up until the early 2000s, prosecutions under that provision were rare, but they began to rise in the 2010s. Some reports linked this increase in prosecutions to the opioid epidemic in the United States. Minnesota law also defines the crime of third-degree murder of an unborn child, with the same elements of depraved mind and lack of intent to kill distinguishing it from first- or second-degree murder of an unborn child. Both third-degree murder and third-degree murder of an unborn child are punishable by a maximum of 25 years' imprisonment.

=== Nevada ===
In Nevada, first-degree murder is the unlawful killing of a human being with malice aforethought, either expressed or implied. If a serial killer is found guilty with aggravating circumstances, for example killing someone with torture or killing a stranger with no apparent motive, then the state can seek the death penalty or a sentence of life without parole.

=== New Mexico ===
New Mexico once divided the crime of murder into five different degrees. A legal scholar writing in 1953 (by which time this level of division had been abolished) described this as the "all-time 'record'" for dividing murder into degrees. The definitions were as follows:

- first degree: premeditated killing (punished by life imprisonment)
- second-degree murder was further divided into two kinds
  - killing while committing a felony (punished by 7 to 14 years' imprisonment)
  - killing with an extremely reckless state of mind (punished by life imprisonment)
- third degree: assisting suicide, killing of an unborn child, and other acts of that nature (punished by 3 to 10 years' imprisonment)
- fourth degree: killing in the heat of passion, killing while committing a misdemeanour (punished by 1 to 7 years' imprisonment)
- fifth degree: "every other killing" that is not justifiable (punished by a maximum fine of $1,000, up to 10 years' imprisonment, or some combination of these)

In the 1884 Compiled Laws of New Mexico, third-degree murder included assisting a suicide (§ 696), killing of an unborn child by injury to the mother (§ 697), administration of abortifacient causing death of an unborn child or its mother (§ 698), unintentional killing of a human being in the heat of passion in a cruel or unusual manner (§ 699), and unintentional death caused by an intoxicated physician (§ 701).

=== Oregon ===
Oregon revised the state's criminal homicide laws in 2023, prior to that the state used the common law charges of murder and aggravated murder. The revision was due to the passage of Senate Bill 1013 which added separate degrees for murder, adding second degree murder and first degree murder, and retaining aggravated murder as the state's only capital offense. The Oregon Legislative Assembly voted to retain the death penalty as the maximum sentence for aggravated murder, despite Oregon having a legislative moratorium on the death penalty since 2011 when Oregon Governor John Kitzhaber stopped enforcing it, and since then Governor's Kate Brown and Tina Kotek have taken the same stance and commuted all death sentences to life without parole; the last person executed in Oregon was in 1997. Oregon voters decided by a majority of 65% to add the death penalty to the Oregon Constitution in 1984 and therefore would take a constitutional amendment to remove it entirely, there have been several attempts to remove the death penalty but as of 2025 none made it past the hurdles required to be on a ballot for the voters to consider.

- Aggravated murder is defined as (1) The intentional & premeditated killing of two or more persons with the intent to intimidate or coerce the population or government (terrorism) through destruction of property, murder, kidnapping or aircraft piracy. (2) A criminal homicide constituting murder in the second degree that was (a) committed while the defendant was confined in a jail or prison AND had previously been convicted of criminal homicide in any jurisdiction. (b) The intentional & premeditated killing of a person under the age of 14. (c) The intentional & premeditated killing of a police officer, correctional or parole or probation officer, or other person charged with the duty of custody, control or supervision of convicted persons during the performance of their duties.
  - The minimum sentence for aggravated murder is life in prison with the possibility of parole after 30 years. A sentence of life in prison without the possibility of parole is imposed if at least 10 members of the jury vote in favor of it. The death penalty may be sentenced upon a unanimous vote from the jury.
- Murder in the first degree is defined as murder in the second degree with the following aggravating factors: murder for hire, murder for profit, having a previous conviction of criminal homicide, the murder of more than one person, the use of torture, the victim was under the age of 14, the victim was a police-peace-corrections or parole officer, a judge or other elected official, a juror or a witness in a criminal case, a murder committed with the use of an explosive, a murder committed to conceal the commission of a crime or committed in the immediate flight from a crime, a murder committed after the defendant had escaped from custody.
  - The minimum sentence for murder in the first degree is life in prison with the possibility of parole after 30 years; if the defendant was a minor who was at least 15 years old at the time of the murder the minimum sentence is life in prison with the possibility of parole after 15 years. If the defendant was at least 18 years old at the time of the murder the judge may impose a sentence, with sufficient cause, of life in prison without the possibility of parole.
- Murder in the second degree is defined as: (1) Any criminal homicide which: (a) doesn't qualify for any mitigating circumstances that would constitute manslaughter in the first or second degree. (b) When a person's death is caused during the commission of, or immediate flight from the commission of: arson in the first degree, criminal mischief in the first degree where an explosive was used, burglary in the first degree, escape in the first degree, kidnapping in the first or second degree, robbery in the first degree, any felony sexual offense of the first or second degree, compelling prostitution, or assault in the first degree when the victim is under the age of 14. (2) The abuse of a minor under the age of 14 that results in their death under circumstances manifesting depraved indifference to human life.
  - The automatic sentence for murder in the second degree is life in prison with the possibility of parole after 25 years, if the defendant is over the age of 18. If the defendant is a minor who was at least 15 years old at the time of the murder they are sentenced to life with the possibility of parole after 15 years.

=== Pennsylvania ===
Pennsylvania law defines third-degree murder as a murder which is neither a first-degree murder ("criminal homicide ... committed by an intentional killing") nor a second-degree murder ("committed while defendant was engaged as a principal or an accomplice in the perpetration of a felony"). For purposes of that section, "felony" is specifically defined as "engaging in or being an accomplice in the commission of, or an attempt to commit, or flight after committing, or attempting to commit robbery, rape, or deviate sexual intercourse by force or threat of force, arson, burglary or kidnapping." There are also parallel crimes of first-degree, second-degree, and third-degree murder of an unborn child. There does not exist the crime of third-degree murder of a law-enforcement officer, only first-degree and second-degree. Third-degree murder and third-degree murder of an unborn child are punishable by a maximum of 40 years' imprisonment.

Third-degree murder was introduced to Pennsylvania law in a 1974 amendment, at the same time as second-degree murder was redefined as felony murder; prior to that, second-degree murder had been defined as any murder not a first-degree murder. The common-law definition of murder as homicide "with malice aforethought" remains in force in Pennsylvania. A conviction for third-degree murder does not require intent to kill as in first-degree murder, but it still requires malice. In general, Pennsylvania courts have ruled that the standard of "malice" required for a conviction of third-degree murder is the same as that required for aggravated assault: not just "ordinary negligence" nor "mere recklessness", but "a higher degree of culpability, i.e., that which considers and then disregards the threat necessarily posed to human life by the offending conduct". A defense of diminished capacity may reduce first-degree murder to third-degree murder.

The crime known as drug delivery resulting in death had originally been classified as another form of third-degree murder under Pennsylvania law. In Commonwealth v. Ludwig (2005), the Supreme Court of Pennsylvania ruled that this meant that conviction for the crime required the same element of malice as in any other third-degree murder. In response to this ruling, the Pennsylvania General Assembly amended the definition of the crime in 2011 to reclassify it as general criminal homicide rather than specifically as third-degree murder, thus removing the requirement of malice. However, the maximum sentence remained the same 40 years' imprisonment as for third-degree murder.

=== Wisconsin ===
Soon after statehood, Wisconsin enacted statutes repealing the common law crime of murder, creating the statutory crime of murder and dividing the statutory crime of murder into three degrees, with the third encompassing felony murder. For example, the 1849 Revised Statutes defined third-degree murder as a killing "perpetrated without any design to effect the death, by a person engaged in the commission of any felony". The 1956 Criminal Code in § 940.03 defined third-degree murder as causing the death of another "in the course of committing or attempting to commit a felony ... as a natural and probable consequence of the commission of or attempt to commit the felony", and provided that the sentence for the underlying felony could thus be extended by 15 years. This was described by some commentators as a "hybrid" between the common-law felony murder rule and the civil law approach of treating an unintentional death as a "penalty-enhancer" to the punishment for the underlying felony. The 1988 revision of § 940.03 removed the term "third-degree murder" entirely and re-entitled the section as "felony murder".

=== Washington ===
In the state of Washington, a person may be convicted of first-degree murder when there is a premeditated intent to cause the death of another person. Murder in the first-degree is a class A felony in the state of Washington. If a person is convicted of first-degree murder, they will not receive anything lower than life imprisonment. The offender can possibly get a charge of aggravated first-degree murder if they commit first-degree murder and have an aggravating circumstance, for example if they kill a public safety official, such as a police officer, firefighter, or paramedic. In this case, the offender can receive the death penalty. In October 2018, the Washington State Supreme Court ruled that execution could no longer be used as a penalty for any crime.

== See also ==
- Crime in the United States
- Crime of passion
- Criminal negligence
- Depraved-heart murder
- Felony murder and the death penalty in the United States
- List of murder laws by country
- Whole life order, an equivalent life-without-parole sentence given for murder, under certain aggravating circumstances, under English criminal law
