= State v. Shane =

- Court: Ohio Supreme Court
- Full case name: The State of Ohio, Appellee, v. Shane, Appellant.
- Decided: May 13, 1992
- Citations: 590 N.E.2d 272; 63 Ohio St. 3d 630

Court membership
- Judges sitting: Thomas J. Moyer, Robert E. Holmes, Herbert R. Brown, A. William Sweeney, Alice Robie Resnick, Andrew Douglas, J. Craig Wright

Case opinions
- Decision by: Resnick
- Concurrence: Moyer, Holmes, Brown, Sweeney, Douglas, Wright

Keywords
- Crime of passion; Homicide; Provocation

State v. Shane (590 N.E.2d 272, 63 Ohio St. 3d 630) is a 1992 Ohio Supreme Court voluntary manslaughter case that developed a two-step test for "reasonably sufficient provocation" and held that verbal confessions of adultery could not be "reasonably sufficient" provocation.

== Procedural posture ==
The trial judge gave jury instructions for both murder and manslaughter. The defendant was convicted of murder and appealed, claiming the manslaughter instruction had "improperly placed upon him the burden of proving that he acted under the influence of a sudden passion or rage".

== Facts ==
Robert Shane strangled his fiancee, Tina Wagner, after she verbally admitted to sleeping with other men.

== Issues ==
1. What is "reasonably sufficient provocation" under Ohio's murder statute?
2. Whether mere words can be adequate provocation.

== Court's decision ==
Ohio's murder statute requires "serious provocation occasioned by the victim that is reasonably sufficient to incite the person into using deadly force". The court developed a two-step test for "reasonably sufficient provocation" based on the four requirements for voluntary manslaughter:

1. Reasonable provocation
2. Actual provocation
3. A reasonable person would not have cooled off between the provocation and homicide
4. The defendant had not cooled off between the provocation and homicide

The court reasoned that factors 1 and 3 were objective factors, while factors 2 and 4 were subjective factors. Under the court's two-step analysis a trial judge would first apply an objective standard to evaluate whether the provocation was "reasonably sufficient" to bring on a sudden passion or fit of rage. If the objective standard is satisfied under the reasonable person test, the jury may then consider whether the defendant was "under the influence of a sudden passion or in a sudden fit of rage".

The court held that "words alone will not constitute reasonably sufficient provocation to incite the use of deadly force in most situation".

== See also ==
- People v. Valentine, a 1946 California Supreme Court case ruling words to be sufficient provocation
- State v. Dumlao
