= Malice (law) =

Intention to do injury to another party

Malice is a legal term that refers to a party's intention to do injury to another party. Malice is either expressed or implied. For example, malice is expressed when there is a manifested and deliberate intention to unlawfully take away the life of a human being. Malice is implied when no considerable provocation appears, or when the circumstances attending the killing show an abandoned and malignant heart. Malice, in a legal sense, may be inferred from the evidence and imputed to the defendant, depending on the nature of the case.

In many kinds of cases, malice must be found to exist in order to convict. (For example, malice is an element of the crime of arson in many jurisdictions.) In civil law cases, a finding of malice allows for the award of greater damages, or for punitive damages. The legal concept of malice is most common in Anglo-American law, and in other legal systems derived from the English common law system.

In English civil law (being the law of England and Wales), relevant case law in negligence and misfeasance in a public office includes Dunlop v. Woollahra Municipal Council [1982] A.C. 158; Bourgoin S.A. v. Ministry of Agriculture, Fisheries and Food [1986] Q.B. 716; Jones v Swansea City Council [1990] 1 WLR 1453; Three Rivers District Council and Others v Governor and Company of The Bank of England, [2000] and Elguzouli-Daf v Commissioner of Police of the Metropolis [1995] 2 QB 335, in which Lord Justice Steyn found that malice could be made out if the acts were done with an actual intention to cause injury. Malice could be shown if the acts were done in the knowledge of invalidity or lack of power and with knowledge that it would cause or be likely to cause injury. Malice would also exist if the acts were done with reckless indifference or deliberate blindness to that invalidity or lack of power and that likely injury. These elements, with respect, are consistent with the views of the majority albeit that some of those views were expressed tentatively having regard to the basis upon which the case before them was presented.

In English criminal law on mens rea (Latin for "guilty mind"), R v. Cunningham (1957) 2 AER 412 was the pivotal case in establishing both that the test for "maliciously" was subjective rather than objective, and that malice was inevitably linked to recklessness. In that case, a man released gas from the mains into adjoining houses while attempting to steal money from the pay-meter:

In any statutory definition of a crime, malice must be taken ... as requiring either:

1. an actual intention to do the particular kind of harm that in fact was done; or
2. recklessness as to whether such harm should occur or not (i.e. the accused has foreseen that the particular kind of harm might be done and yet has gone on to take the risk of it).

Lord Diplock confirmed the relationship to recklessness in R v Mowatt (1968) 1 QB 421:

In the offence under section 20 of the Offences against the Person Act 1861, the word "maliciously" does import upon the part of the person who unlawfully inflicts the wound or other grievous bodily harm an awareness that his act may have the consequence of causing some physical harm to some other person ... It is quite unnecessary that the accused should have foreseen that his unlawful act might cause physical harm of the gravity described in the section, i.e. a wound or serious physical injury. It is enough that he should have foreseen that some physical harm to some person, albeit of a minor character, might result.

In the United States, the malice standard was set in the Supreme Court case of New York Times Co. v. Sullivan, allowing free reporting of the civil rights movement. The malice standard decides whether press reports about a public figure can be considered defamation or libel.

In the United States criminal law system, 'malice aforethought' is a necessary element for conviction in many crimes. (For example, many jurisdictions see malice aforethought as an element needed to convict for first degree murder.)

== See also ==
- Malice murder
- Malice aforethought
- Mens rea
