= People v. Berry =

Manslaughter case in California

- Supreme Court of California

Decided December 8, 1976
- Full case name: The People, Plaintiff and Respondent, v. Albert Joseph Berry, Defendant and Appellant.
- Citation(s): 18 Cal.3d 509; 556 P.2d 777; 134 Cal. Rptr. 415

Holding
- The defendant received adequate provocation to have committed a crime of passion.

Court membership
- Chief Justice: Donald Wright
- Associate Justices: Marshall F. McComb, Mathew Tobriner, Stanley Mosk, Raymond L. Sullivan, William P. Clark Jr., Frank K. Richardson

Case opinions
- Majority: Sullivan, joined by Wright, McComb, Tobriner, Mosk, Clark, Richardson

People v. Berry is a voluntary manslaughter case that is widely taught in American law schools for the appellate court's unusual interpretation of heat of passion doctrine. Although the defendant had time to "cool down" between his wife's verbal admission of infidelity and the killing, the California Supreme Court held that the provocation in this case was adequate to reduce a murder charge to manslaughter. The lower court had relied on the traditional definition of "adequate provocation" in its jury instructions. The California Supreme Court reversed Berry's murder conviction, while affirming Berry's conviction for assault using deadly force.

The case has also been discussed or mentioned in more than forty separate academic journal articles relating to murder, female victims of domestic violence, and rape. More than 160 court decisions in California have cited, mentioned, or discussed this opinion.

== Background ==
Voluntary manslaughter is a form of homicide in which a perpetrator's culpability, and thus often that perpetrator's sentence if convicted, is less than it would be in a case of murder because an "adequate provocation" demonstrated the absence of, displaced, or negated malice. At common law, only actions fitting within one of multiple specifically defined categories were deemed provocation potentially sufficient to perform this function. By Berry's 1976 decision date, however, the categories of action qualifying as adequate provocation had grown so broad that some encompassed circumstances involving purely verbal provocation , and the Berry decision held that as of its issuance "no specific type of provocation is required" and "verbal provocation may be sufficient."

Although Berry did not change the law of manslaughter at the time, instead applying a previous precedent Borchers, it is taught in most first-year law courses as an example of how the doctrine of provocation developed and moved away from strictly construing the traditional rule that for an act to constitute provocation rendering a homicide manslaughter rather than murder there must not have passed enough time between the alleged provocation and the act of homicide that during the intervening period a reasonable person's passions would have "cooled."

== Facts ==
Albert Joseph Berry was charged with murdering his wife, Rachel Pessah. The couple married in May 1974; Ms. Pessah was 26 years younger than Berry, and a recent immigrant from Israel. Three days after their wedding Rachel left for Israel, where she stayed for six weeks. Upon her return, she told her husband, Berry, that she had fallen in love with a man named Yako. The court summarized the facts leading up to Rachel's killing as "a tormenting two weeks in which Rachel alternately taunted defendant with her involvement with Yako and at the same time sexually excited defendant". The crime was committed two weeks after Rachel first admitted the infidelity to her husband. Between Rachel's admission and the homicide, Berry had left the apartment and spent time with friends. When he returned to the apartment, Rachel wasn't home. Rachel returned home the next morning, on July 26, 1974. When Berry tried to talk to Rachel, she started screaming, and that was when he strangled her with a telephone cord. Police arrested Albert Joseph Berry for her murder on August 1, 1974.

== Procedural history ==
The defendant was charged under § 187 of the California Penal Code. He was convicted of first degree murder by a jury. This defense appealed the murder conviction on the grounds that the trial court's failure to instruct the jury on voluntary manslaughter was a reversible error. The defense claimed that a voluntary manslaughter instruction should have been given for both heat of passion and diminished capacity. The appeals court granted an appeal only for the heat of passion claim.

== Issue ==
The issue decided in the case was whether taunts and provocation over a period of time could be adequate provocation for heat of passion manslaughter.

== Appellate court's decision ==
The court reversed the first-degree murder conviction, explaining that the question of whether the defendant had acted under the heat of passion should have properly been resolved by the jury. Relying on a previous case People v. Borchers, the court wrote that "evidence of admissions of infidelity by the defendant's paramour, taunts directed to him and other conduct, 'supports a finding that the defendant killed in wild desperation induced by (the woman's) long, continued provocatory conduct'.

Prosecutors argued that manslaughter was not applicable because there had been a "cooling period" between the initial admission and the homicide, but the court rejected the argument, writing that "the long course of provocatory conduct...reached its final culmination in the apartment when Rachel began screaming". Wayne LaFave has described this as rekindling an earlier passion, writing that the Court found that Pessah's screaming was "sufficient to rekindle passion regarding her earlier confession of adultery".

A prominent psychiatrist, Dr. Martin Blinder, had testified at trial that the victim was suicidal and that her taunting of Berry was an attempt to provoke him into killing her. He also testified that the long course of psychological torment she inflicted on Berry would have produced the same type of blind, uncontrollable rage traditionally associated with "heat of passion" defenses.

== Other information ==
The lead prosecutor in this case was Evelle J. Younger. The defense attorney on appeal was Edward W. Suman.

Transcripts of testimonies from the trial, which have been reviewed by law professor Donna Coker contain additional facts that the California Supreme Court did not include in their decision. The defendant, Berry, had a history of intimate violence and before his marriage to Pessah, had stabbed his second wife eleven times after she called out another man's name during sex. Berry had also admitted to police that he "deliberately waited to kill [Rachel]. No pretense, no bullshit, no nothing."

Two years passed before the California Supreme Court remanded the case for a new trial. Berry's trial attorney, public defender Geoffrey Brown had obtained Pessah's hospital records for psychiatric treatment she had received after a previous incident where Berry had strangled. The records provided details about Pessah's relationship with Yacob, and supported Dr. Blinder's testimony about Rachel's depression. The defense accepted a plea agreement for second degree murder, which carried a minimum 5 year sentence.
