= People v. Valentine =

- Supreme Court of California

Decided April 30, 1946
- Full case name: The People, Respondent, v. John Valentine, Appellant.
- Citation(s): 28 Cal. 2d 121; 169 P.2d 1

Holding
- Verbal aggression can be considered adequate provocation when determining if the defendant committed a crime of passion. District Court of Appeal reversed.

Court membership
- Chief Justice: Phil S. Gibson
- Associate Justices: John W. Shenk, Douglas L. Edmonds, Jesse W. Carter, Roger J. Traynor, B. Rey Schauer, Homer R. Spence

Case opinions
- Majority: Schauer, joined by Gibson, Carter, Traynor
- Concurrence: Spence
- Dissent: Shenk, joined by Edmonds

People v. Valentine, 28 Cal.2d 121, 169 P.2d 1 (1946) is a landmark California Supreme Court voluntary manslaughter case where the court holds that mere words may be adequate provocation.

== Background ==
Under California law, a defendant accused of second-degree murder may receive a lesser charge of voluntary manslaughter if the murder was a crime of passion (i.e., done in the heat of the moment). To argue a crime of passion, however, the defendant must prove they were provoked. California courts had been divided on the question of whether mere words could be adequate provocation for nearly a century when Valentine was decided. The 1857 case People v. Butler was the earliest case that applied the traditional categorical test for adequate provocation, relying on the Crime and Punishments Act of 1850, which was based on traditional common law principles. Adequate provocation under the 1850 statute required "a serious and highly-provoking injury inflicted upon the person killing, sufficient to excite an irresistible passion in a reasonable person". Beginning with People v. Hurtado in 1883, a second line of cases had taken a broader approach by allowing juries to decide whether certain facts fulfilled the requirement of adequate provocation. The California Supreme Court's decision in Valentine resolved this split in favor of the broader approach.

== Facts ==
In November 1943, John Valentine shot his neighbor Raymon Boyd after Boyd accused him of trespassing. A jury trial found Valentine guilty of first-degree murder, and he was convicted and given a life sentence. Valentine appealed his conviction, arguing that the differences between first-degree murder, second-degree murder, and voluntary manslaughter had been explained incorrectly to the jury, and asked the court to modify the judgement.

== Court's decision ==
The Court held that verbal provocation may be adequate provocation in some cases, and that the question of whether facts support a finding of heat of passion should properly be resolved by a jury.
