= Chance medley =

Homicide arising from sudden quarrel or fight

Chance medley (from the Anglo-French chance-medlee, a mixed chance), also 'chaunce medley' or 'chaude melle', is a term from English law used to describe a homicide arising from a sudden quarrel or fight. In other words, the term describes "the casual killing of a man, not altogether without the killer's fault, though without an evil intent; homicide by misadventure". The term distinguishes a killing that lacks malice aforethought necessary for murder, on the one hand, and pure accident on the other.

An early version of voluntary manslaughter, "chance medley" was a common defense in the 16th and 17th centuries but had fallen out of use by the 18th century, gradually replaced by the doctrine of provocation.
