= People v. Chevalier =

- Court: Supreme Court of Illinois
- Full case name: The People of the State of Illinois, Appellant, v. Maurice Chevalier, Appellee. — The People of the State of Illinois, Appellant, v. Esteban Flores, Appellee.
- Decided: September 20, 1989
- Citation: 544 N.E.2d 942; 131 Ill.2d 66

Court membership
- Judges sitting: Howard C. Ryan, Thomas J. Moran, William G. Clark, Benjamin K. Miller, John J. Stamos, Horace L. Calvo

Case opinions
- Decision by: Stamos

Keywords
- Homicide; Provocation

People v. Chevalier, 131 Ill.2d 66, 544 N.E.2d 942 (1989), was a 1989 Illinois Supreme Court decision that affirmed murder convictions in two consolidated appeals, holding that mere words or verbal admission of infidelity was not sufficient provocation for a manslaughter.

== Background ==
The revised Illinois homicide statute of 1986 replaced the crimes of murder and manslaughter with first and second degree homicide, but courts continued to apply case law that was decided under the old statute. The rule at the time was that adultery with the defendant's spouse was adequate provocation to reduce a murder charge to manslaughter. In the Chevalier decision, the Illinois Supreme Court overturned previous intermediate appellate cases like People v. Ambro and People v. Carr, holding that mere words or verbal communication could not be adequate provocation to reduce a murder charge to manslaughter.

== Procedural posture ==
This case was consolidated with People v. Flores, 168 Ill.App.3d. In both cases the defendants' had been convicted of murder for shooting and killing their wives after a verbal admission of infidelity. The murder convictions were affirmed based on the traditional categorical approach for adequate provocation.

== Facts ==
During an argument, Chevalier shot and killed his wife after she made disparaging remarks about his sexual prowess and verbally admitted to infidelity.

== Issue ==
Whether a verbal admission of infidelity is adequate provocation for a manslaughter instruction.

== Court's decision ==
The court held that a verbal admission of infidelity was not sufficient provocation to reduce a murder charge to manslaughter. The court wrote:

In Illinois, adultery with a spouse as provocation has been limited to those instances where the parties are discovered in the act of adultery or immediately before or after such an act, and the killing immediately follows such discovery.
