= Killing of Lacey Fletcher =

2022 filicide in Slaughter, Louisiana, US

- Lacey Fletcher in 2002
- Location: Slaughter, Louisiana, U.S.
- Date: January 3, 2022; 4 years ago
- Attack type: Homicide by neglect, filicide
- Victims: Lacey Ellen Fletcher, aged 36
- Perpetrators: Sheila and Clay Fletcher
- Charges: Second-degree murder (dropped after plea deal)
- Verdict: Pleaded no contest
- Convictions: Manslaughter
- Sentence: 20 years in prison (Note: Plus a 20-year suspended sentence.)

On January 3, 2022, 36-year-old Lacey Ellen Fletcher was discovered deceased at her parents' home in Slaughter, Louisiana. Lacey had been subjected to extreme neglect; as a result, she was found malnourished, with severe ulcers (among other health problems), and her body was fused to the sofa.

Sheila and Clay Fletcher, Lacey's parents, were charged with second degree murder for her death. In February 2024, they were given a plea deal for the lesser charge of manslaughter. On March 20, 2024, they were both sentenced to 40 years in prison, with 20 years suspended, and 5 years of probation after release.

== Neglect and killing ==
=== Background ===
Lacey Ellen Fletcher (November 25, 1985 – January 3, 2022) had been diagnosed with autism and reportedly experienced bullying in high school. Her parents, Sheila and Clay Fletcher, later withdrew her from school and instead homeschooled her. Sheila and Clay had not wanted to be caregivers when they became parents, and would often complain about Lacey.

The last time Lacey was seen by the public was when she was 21 years old. Three years later, a decline in her cognitive health rendered her unable to leave the house. She became confined to the family's leather couch, yet her family never sought medical attention. She was left unattended for such a long time that bedsores began to form, leaving open wounds on her backside and her legs. When the coroner arrived, she was found to be covered in her own excrement; bugs and maggots were reportedly eating away at her body, and she had become fused to the leather couch.

=== Neglect ===
Lacey's cognitive health decline contributed to her inability to leave the house. Neighbors testified that when Sheila would answer the door to talk to a neighbor, she would swiftly shut the door to conceal Lacey. Additionally, Sheila allegedly spoke in a hushed, whispering tone when speaking to unfamiliar people, because any sound of a stranger's voice could trigger Lacey's severe social anxiety and cause her to become unresponsive.

Lacey's parents would bring her food and water, and placed towels next to her so their daughter's excrement would be easier for them to clean. Over time, she became unable to move enough to use the towel, and instead defecated on the couch. Clay and Sheila would frequently leave for days to go on vacation, leaving her to starve.

There were signs she had been trying to lift herself out of the couch; she tried to lift her lower half—hence the fecal matter smeared on her body and hands—but due to severe malnourishment and atrophy in her leg muscles, she was unable to pull herself out. Her body fused to the fiber of the leather couch cushion, which had been worn down into a deep depression. She was covered in urine and feces, and maggots lived inside her knotted brown hair and inside her pressure ulcers. She suffered starvation and bone infections, leading to sepsis, which was listed as her official cause of death. Additionally, she was diagnosed with COVID-19 while determining her cause of death, although where she contracted the virus is unknown. Feces and couch cushioning were recovered from under her fingernails and in her stomach, showing that she had attempted to eat her surroundings either during or shortly after Clay and Sheila vacationed for the holidays.

=== Death ===
On January 3, 2022, 911 reported that Sheila had found her daughter dead on their couch. Emergency services and the coroner arrived at the home shortly after and discovered Lacey's dead, partially clothed and malnourished 96-pound (43 kg) body fused into the family's leather couch, with clear signs of neglect. Investigators noted that the couch had been pulled apart, and scratch marks were present near the area Lacey sat in.

It was determined that Lacey had been dead for one to two days before Sheila's 911 call. Sheila and Clay had said that Lacey had chosen herself to live in such poor conditions, and they simply "[respected] her wishes to stay on the couch." Her death was ultimately ruled a homicide. Investigators reported the case was so disturbing they were unable to sleep or eat.

== Legal proceedings ==
In May 2022, Sheila and Clay Fletcher were arrested and charged with the second-degree murder of Lacey. They were later released on bail. A judge dismissed the charge, but Sheila and Clay were re-indicted for murder by a grand jury in June 2023.

On February 6, 2024, Sheila and Clay pleaded no contest in exchange for the charge being reduced to the lesser conviction of manslaughter. If convicted of second-degree murder, they would have faced a mandatory sentence of life imprisonment without the possibility of parole. The prosecution stated their intention to seek the maximum manslaughter sentence of 40 years in prison was an attempt to achieve a de facto life sentence for Sheila and Clay. On March 20, 2024, they were sentenced to 20 years, with a consecutive 20-year suspended sentence.

== See also ==
- Depraved-heart murder
- Mortality of autistic individuals
