= Depraved-heart murder =

Killing where the circumstances demonstrate a "depraved indifference" to human life

In United States law, depraved-heart murder, also known as depraved-indifference murder or extreme indifference murder, is a type of murder where an individual acts with a "depraved indifference" to human life and where such acts result in a death, despite that individual not explicitly intending to kill. In a depraved-heart murder, defendants commit an act even though they know their act runs an unusually high risk of causing death or serious bodily harm to a person. If the risk of death or bodily harm is great enough, ignoring it demonstrates a "depraved indifference" to human life and the resulting death is considered to have been committed with malice aforethought. In some states, depraved-heart killings constitute second-degree murder, while in others, the act would be charged with "wanton murder", varying degrees of manslaughter, or third-degree murder.

If no death results, such an act would generally constitute reckless endangerment (sometimes known as "culpable negligence") and possibly other crimes, such as assault.

== Common law background ==
It ["depraved heart" murder] is the form [of murder] that establishes that the wilful doing of a dangerous and reckless act with wanton indifference to the consequences and perils involved is just as blameworthy, and just as worthy of punishment, when the harmful result ensues as is the express intent to kill itself. This highly blameworthy state of mind is not one of mere negligence... It is not merely one even of gross criminal negligence... It involves rather the deliberate perpetration of a knowingly dangerous act with reckless and wanton unconcern and indifference as to whether anyone is harmed or not. The common law treats such a state of mind as just as blameworthy, just as anti-social and, therefore, just as truly murderous as the specific intents to kill and to harm.

The common law punishes unintentional homicide as murder if the defendant commits an act of gross recklessness. A classic example of depraved-heart murder under the common law is in the case Commonwealth v. Malone, a Pennsylvania case in which the court affirmed the second-degree murder conviction of a teenager for a death arising from a game of modified Russian roulette in which the teenager pointed the gun at another person and repeatedly pulled the trigger, resulting in the death of the latter.

== Under the Model Penal Code ==
Depraved-heart murder is recognized in the Model Penal Code § 210.2(1)(b). The Model Penal Code considers unintentional killing to constitute murder when the conduct of the defendant manifests "extreme indifference to the value of human life".

== International equivalents ==
=== Canada ===
The Canadian Criminal Code categorizes murder as first- and second-degree for sentencing purposes. However, the Supreme Court of Canada held that murder requires, at minimum, subjective knowledge that death is a likely consequence of the defendant's actions.

Section 229(a)(ii) of the Canadian Criminal Code is most closely analogous to depraved-heart murder, applying where the defendant intended to cause bodily harm to the deceased that he subjectively knew was likely to cause death, and was reckless as to the risk of death.

=== England and Wales ===
Murder is not classified into degrees in England and Wales, unlike in Canada, but sentences are more severe (always life, but with a longer period when the offender is ineligible for parole) in cases where there are more aggravating than mitigating factors. Murder requires intent to kill or cause grievous bodily harm; recklessness as to harm will not suffice. In a case where death results from recklessness, the defendant can be found guilty of manslaughter.

=== Germany ===
A similar concept is Eventualvorsatz, also called dolus eventualis or bedingter Vorsatz (literally: "conditional intent"). Under this concept, a court can treat the result of a criminal act as intentional if the defendant did not explicitly intend this result, but realized it was not unlikely and knowingly accepted this risk.

While Eventualvorsatz can apply to any crime, it is usually only applied in cases involving bodily harm or murder. Typical cases where courts recognized Eventualvorsatz (in this case for murder) include setting fire to an inhabited house and reckless speeding in an urban area.

== Well-known cases ==
=== 1946 Russian roulette case ===
In the 1946 case, Commonwealth v. Malone, the Supreme Court of Pennsylvania affirmed the conviction of a teenager on the charge of second degree murder using the depraved-heart doctrine. The teenager in question had set up a game of Russian roulette which ended in the death of another teenager, a friend of the defendant. When tried for the crime of murder, his defense argued that since the defendant had no intent to kill, he could not be convicted of murder. The prosecution successfully argued using the depraved-heart doctrine that the defendant's recklessness and carelessness amounted to a level of negligence sufficient to serve as evidence of criminally culpable intent.

=== 2015 death of Freddie Gray ===
Caesar Goodson, Jr., a Baltimore police officer, was charged on May 21, 2015, with second-degree depraved heart murder for his involvement in the death of 25-year-old Freddie Gray while in police custody. Gray died several days after he was arrested and driven in a police van to jail. The van was shown on video during the trial to have been driven normally, but was alleged to have been driven aggressively with no regard for the safety of the prisoner, who was not adequately secured for safety. Further, the prisoner was shackled, preventing him from protecting himself. The prosecution alleged that the injuries were inflicted during the ride and that pleas for medical attention were ignored. Officer Goodson was charged with second-degree depraved-heart murder before the internal investigation was completed. He was found not guilty on June 23, 2016. Of the six officers charged, three were acquitted, and charges were dropped against the remaining three.

=== Murder of George Floyd ===
The murder of George Floyd, an African-American man, occurred in Minneapolis, Minnesota on May 25, 2020. Derek Chauvin, a white Minneapolis police officer, kept his knee on Floyd's neck for 8 minutes and 46 seconds, 2 minutes and 53 seconds of which occurred after Floyd became unresponsive, according to the criminal complaint filed against Chauvin. Floyd was handcuffed and lying prone on the road throughout that time. Officers Thomas K. Lane, Tou Thao, and J. Alexander Kueng participated in Floyd's arrest, with Kueng holding Floyd’s back, Lane holding his legs, and Thao looking on as he stood nearby. Chauvin was charged with third-degree depraved-heart murder under Minnesota law on May 29, 2020. On April 20, 2021, Chauvin was convicted of unintentional second-degree murder, third-degree murder, and second-degree manslaughter, while the other officers pled guilty for various charges related to the murder.

== See also ==
- Criminal negligence
- Crime of passion
- Northington v. State
- Killing of Lacey Fletcher
