= People v. Anderson (1968) =

California trial for first degree murder

- Supreme Court of California

Decided December 23, 1968
- Full case name: The People, Plaintiff and Respondent, v. Robert Arthur Anderson, Defendant and Appellant
- Citation(s): 70 Cal.2d 15, 447 P.2d 94

Court membership
- Chief Justice: Traynor
- Associate Justices: McComb, Peters, Tobriner, Burke, Sullivan; Peek (Retired Associate Justice of the Supreme Court sitting under assignment by the Chairman of the Judicial Council)

Case opinions
- Majority: Tobriner, joined by Traynor, Peters, Peek
- Dissent: Burke, joined by McComb
- Dissent: Sullivan

People v. Anderson, 70 Cal.2d 15, 447 P.2d 942 (1968), is a California criminal case involving evidentiary criteria for the element of premeditation in a first degree murder prosecution, to be sufficient to go to the jury. The case sets forth three categories of evidentiary factors necessary for evidence to be sufficient to support a jury verdict of first degree murder.

The underlying case involved a man drinking, stripping the clothes off of the 10-year-old daughter of his live-in girlfriend, then stabbing the child 60 times, including after she was already dead. A question on appeal was as to whether there was sufficient evidence for a reasonable jury to find the element of premeditation.

The court wrote:

The type of evidence which this court has found sufficient to sustain a finding of premeditation and deliberation falls into three categories: (1) facts about how and what defendant did prior to the actual killing which show that the defendant was engaged in activity directed toward, and explicable as intended to result in, the killing - what may be considered as 'planning' activity; (2) facts about the defendant's prior relationship and/or conduct with the victim from which the jury could reasonably infer a 'motive' to kill the victim, which inference of motive, together with facts of type (1) or (3), would in turn support an inference that the killing was the result of a 'pre-existing reflection' and 'careful thought and weighing of considerations' rather than 'mere unconsidered rash impulse hastily executed' (People v. Thomas, 25 Cal. 2d 880), (3) facts about the nature of killing from which the jury could infer that the manner of killing was so particular and exacting that the defendant must have intentionally killed according to a 'preconceived design' to take his victim's life in a particular way for a 'reason' which the jury can reasonably infer from facts of type (1) or (2).
Analysis of the cases will show that this court sustains verdicts of first degree murder typically when there is evidence of all three types and otherwise requires at least extremely strong evidence of (1) or evidence of (2) in conjunction with either (1) or (3). [70 Cal. 3d at 27]."
