= State v. Dumlao =

State v. Dumlao is a 1986 criminal Hawaii Intermediate Court of Appeals case appealing a murder conviction on the ground that the court's decision to not issue a jury instruction for voluntary manslaughter based on extreme emotional disturbance was a reversible error. The court found that the Model Penal Code required a subjective analysis of whether provocation is adequate from the defendant's perspective. Based on medical testimony that Dumlao suffered from "paranoid personality disorder", which included symptoms of "unwarranted suspiciousness" and hypersensitivity, the Court granted Dumlao's appeal, holding that his actions on the night he killed his mother in law had been "reasonable" from his perspective.

== Background ==
A murder may be reduced to voluntary manslaughter if there is adequate provocation for the intentional homicide. Traditionally, the provocation had to be external to the defendant, but §210.3(I)(b) of the Model Penal Code moved away from this by defining manslaughter as a homicide that is "committed under the influence of extreme emotional or mental disturbance for which there is reasonable explanation or excuse". In the Dumlao case the court interpreted this language broadly to permit consideration of reasonableness from the defendant's viewpoint when evaluating whether the provocation was adequate. This allowed the jury to take the defendant's "mental abnormalities" into account, instead of adhering to the traditional objective reasonable person standard.

== Facts ==
Vidado B. Dumlao killed his mother in law. An expert medical witness for the defense testified at the trial that Dumlao suffered from "paranoid personality disorder". He described Dumlao as having "unwarranted suspiciousness" that included pathological jealousy. The second symptom of Dumlao's disorder, according to the expert testimony, was hypersensitivity in the sense of being easily offended and inclined to counterattack when threatened. Testimony from his wife confirmed a history of domestic violence caused by "extreme jealousy". Dumlao had accused his wife of being sexually involved with her brothers. The court wrote that "Dumlao's testimony, describing his own perceptions of the night in question, further confirms the nature of his extreme jealousy". According to Dumlao, his wife's brother Pedrito attacked him. Dumlao testified that he only pulled out his gun to scare Pedrito and accidentally shot his mother in law.

== Issue ==
Whether or not a homicide committed during an extreme emotional disturbance for which there may be a subjectively reasonable explanation could be manslaughter.

== Court's decision ==
The Court explained that the test for voluntary manslaughter has four requirements:

1. provocation that would rouse a reasonable person to the heat of passion
2. actual provocation of the defendant
3. a reasonable person would not have cooled off in the time between the provocation and the offense
4. the defendant did not cool off

Relying on previous precedent, the court writes that the objective reasonable man standard for provocation at common law did not take the defendant's mental state into account. The Model Penal Code standard, according to the Court, created a subjective standard to be evaluated from the "defendant's standpoint". The Court concludes that Dumlao had a psychological disorder which may have caused an extreme emotional disturbance during which, from his viewpoint, his actions were reasonable.
