= R v Faulkner =

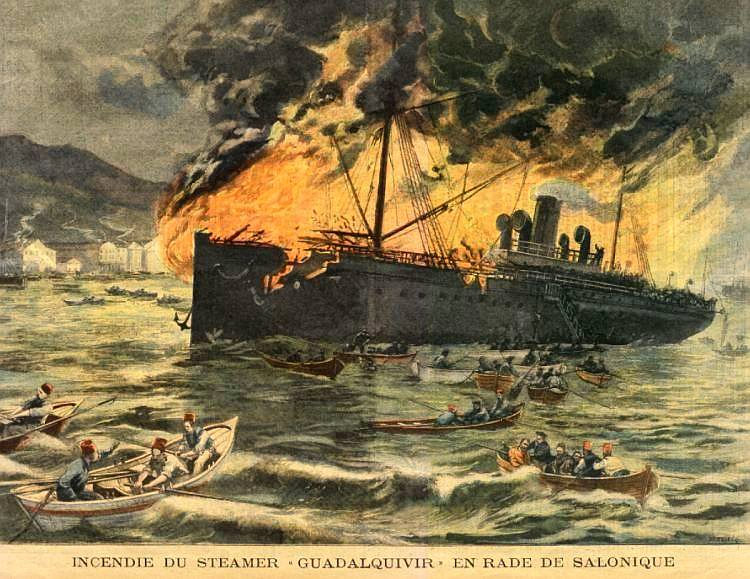
- Court: Court of Appeal
- Full case name: Rex v. Faulkner
- Citation: 13 Cox CC 550 (1877)

Case history
- Prior action: Conviction at local crown court (trial presided by unknown) in 1877

Case opinions
- Per curiam (unanimously)

Keywords
- Novus actus interveniens; causation

R v. Faulkner (1877) is a key reported appeal the Court for Crown Cases Reserved: holding that the mens rea for committing one criminal act does not necessarily transfer to all possible, potentially in other ways criminal, consequences of that act.

== Decision ==
The defendant was employed on a ship transporting rum, sugar, and cotton. He was not allowed into the cargo hold, but he entered it, poked a hole in a barrel of rum, and drank some of it; to see while plugging this, he lit a match. The rum caught fire and destroyed the ship. The trial court found the defendant guilty of larceny for the rum and arson for the ship. The Court for Crown Cases Reserved quashed the latter conviction based on unlawful (improper) jury instructions that allowed the jury to find the defendant guilty of the arson even if they found that he only had the intent to commit the larceny. The court explained that the intent to commit the larceny did not necessarily mean that the defendant had the intent to commit the arson.

== Applied by ==
The case was considered by R v Smith (Jim) (Director of Public Prosecutions v Smith) decided by the highest criminal court in 1960, looking at the natural or probable consequence of acts that resulted in homicide.

== Reckless criminal damage ==
Oblique intentions have led to a range of precedent-level decisions for follow-on or aggravated offenses relating to criminal damage. Among these are R v Cunningham, a 1957 decision of the Court of Appeal, which overviewed the law. Its fact pattern was interference with a gas meter for financial gain, yet causing injury.
