= Categorical test =

The categorical test is a legal standard for determining whether there has been adequate provocation to reduce a murder charge to voluntary manslaughter. Traditionally, the mens rea for murder was malice aforethought. While murder and voluntary manslaughter are both intentional homicides, adequate provocation mitigates a defendant's culpability. Adequate provocation is a legal requirement for a murder charge to be reduced to voluntary manslaughter. The test for adequate provocation varies across jurisdictions and has changed over time. The categorical approach is based on common law principles, but most courts today apply less restrictive tests, such as the extreme emotional disturbance test in Model Penal Code jurisdictions.

== Historical background ==
The formal distinction between manslaughter and murder begins to emerge in the 16th century. As early as the 1550s, cases appear in law reports that begin to develop the jurisprudence of manslaughter. Provocation began to replace the earlier "hotbloodedness" when a landmark case from 1600 established that insults and rude gestures were not sufficient provocation to reduce a murder charge to manslaughter. After this case, judges began to develop four common law "categories" of provocation:

1. seeing a friend or family member attacked (1612)
2. insulting physical attacks like boxing the ears (early 17th century)
3. seeing an English person unlawfully deprived of liberty (1666)
4. seeing another man committing adultery with one's wife
