= Northington v. State =

- Court: Alabama Court of Criminal Appeals
- Full case name: Lana Northington v. State
- Decided: November 24, 1981
- Citation: 413 So.2d 1169 (Ala. Crim. App. 1981)

Court membership
- Judge sitting: William M. Bowen Jr.

Case opinions
- Decision by: Bowen

Northington v. State, 413 So.2d 1169 (1981), was a case decided by the Court of Criminal Appeals of Alabama that reversed a conviction for murder on the basis that depraved heart murder requires a universal malice directed towards human life in general rather than malice directed towards a specific individual.

== Decision ==
Defendant Northington was convicted of murder after allowing her five-month-old daughter to starve to death. The appellate court reversed the conviction because the mens rea requirement for depraved heart murder was held to be universal malice towards human life in general, and Northington displayed extreme reckless indifference towards her daughter only.
