= Legitimate defense of honor =

Legal term in Brazilian jurisprudence

Legitimate defense of honor (Portuguese: legítima defesa da honra) is a legal term in Brazilian jurisprudence, used by the defense to justify the defendant's acts as a crime of passion, attributing the motivating factor of the crime to the behavior of the victim. This justification has been used, among other reasons, to eliminate or reduce the culpability of a spouse or lover who has committed violence against a female partner. In 2023, the Supreme Court ruled the measure unconstitutional in jury trials of femicide cases.
