= Commonwealth v. Malone =

1946 Pennsylvania court case

- Court: Supreme Court of Pennsylvania
- Full case name: Commonwealth of Pennsylvania v. Malone
- Decided: April 8, 1946
- Citations: 354 Pa. 180; 47 A.2d 445

Court membership
- Judges sitting: James B. Drew, William B. Linn, George W. Maxey, Marion D. Patterson, Allen M. Stearne, Horace Stern

Case opinions
- Decision by: Maxey

Keywords
- Depraved-heart murder

Commonwealth v. Malone, 354 Pa. 180, 47 A.2d 445 (1946), was a case decided by the Supreme Court of Pennsylvania that affirmed the conviction of a teenager for second degree murder. The teenagers had played a modified version of Russian roulette called Russian Poker, in which they took turns aiming and pulling the trigger of a revolver at each other, rather than at their own heads. Therefore without an intent to kill or harm, Malone had pointed the gun at his friend's side and pulled the trigger, killing him. However, the court ruled that "When an individual commits an act of gross recklessness without regard to the probability that death to another is likely to result, that individual exhibits the state of mind required to uphold a conviction of manslaughter even if the individual did not intend for death to ensue."

The case is often used to exemplify depraved-heart murder – that is, cases where there is such recklessness and indifference to life and risk of death as to fulfill the mens rea for murder despite the fact that the killing of the specific victim was unintentional. It has not yet been established whether simply participating in a game of Russian roulette in which another participant kills himself by his own hand could constitute manslaughter or some lesser form of conspiracy or homicide for others involved who survived.

== Background ==
James J. Malone, age 17, and his mother were staying with the family of William H. Long, age 13. Malone had obtained a revolver from his uncle, while Long had obtained a cartridge from his father's room. Malone suggested that the two play "Russian poker", to which Long consented. Malone then pressed the gun against Long's side and pulled the trigger three times. On the third pull, the gun fired. Long eventually died from his wounds and Malone was charged with his murder.

According to the defense, Malone loaded the gun chamber adjacent to the firing chamber and did not expect the gun to go off when he pulled the trigger.

== Decision ==
The court used common law analysis to determine that a game of Russian roulette evinced malice and recklessness towards a very serious risk, thus fulfilling the mens rea required for depraved heart murder despite the fact that the killing of the specific victim was unintentional.
