= R v Clinton =

2012 Court of Appeal case

- Court: Court of Appeal
- Decided: 17 January 2012
- Citations: [2012] EWCA Crim 2; [2012] 2 All ER 947; [2012] 3 WLR 515; [2012] Crim LR 539; [2012] 1 Cr App R 26; [2013] QB 1
- Transcript: Judgment at BAILII

Case history
- Appealed from: T2010/7430; T2010/7390-1; T2010/7399

R v Clinton [2012] EWCA Crim 2 is a judgment of the Court of Appeal of England and Wales concerning the loss of control defence to murder, and the context of sexual infidelity.

== Facts ==
The case was a joint appeal against conviction by three men convicted of murder for killing their wives following the discovery of sexual infidelity. At trial, all three had relied on the loss of control defence. In one of the trials (Jon Clinton), the judge found that the defendant had not adduced sufficient evidence to allow loss of control to be put to the jury. In the other two (Parker and Evans), the defence was put to the jury, who rejected it and convicted them of murder.

Loss of control was introduced by the Coroners and Justice Act 2009 as a replacement for the previous defence of provocation.

The wording of the statutory text specifically excludes sexual infidelity. All three defendants argued that sexual infidelity alone was not the cause of their loss of control—instead, they had lost control due to a number of facts including their spouse's sexual infidelity. The court was asked to determine whether the loss of control defence could apply when sexual infidelity was combined with other factors that caused the purported loss of control, and whether the judges who put the issue to the jury had properly directed the jury in summing up.

== Judgment ==
The judgment was delivered on 17 January 2012, by the Lord Chief Justice, Igor Judge with Justice Henriques and Justice Gloster concurring.

The court decided that loss of control could be put to a jury when sexual infidelity alone was not the only cause of loss of control. They ordered a retrial for Clinton. He pleaded guilty to murder at the retrial and was given a mandatory life sentence with a minimum tariff of twenty years.

The court determined that the jury direction for the other two cases was satisfactory and rejected their appeals.

== Commentary ==
Vera Baird described the judgment as a "totemic setback for campaigning women".
