= Russian roulette =

Potentially lethal game of chance

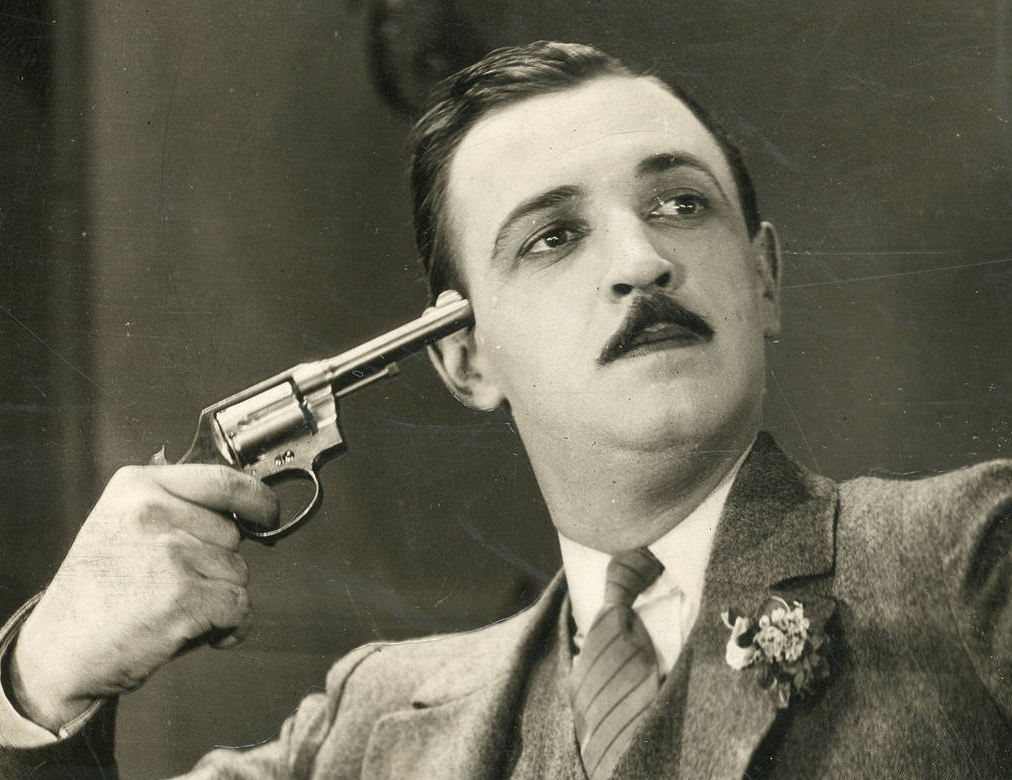
Russian roulette as depicted in the 1925 film The Night Club.

Russian roulette (Russian: Ру́сская руле́тка, romanized: Rússkaya rulétka) is a potentially lethal game of chance in which a player places a single round in a revolver, spins the cylinder, places the muzzle against the head or body (their opponent's or their own), and pulls the trigger. If the loaded chamber aligns with the barrel after cocking (with a single-action revolver), or is in the position which will be rotated to the barrel upon pulling the trigger (double-action), the weapon fires.

== Etymology ==
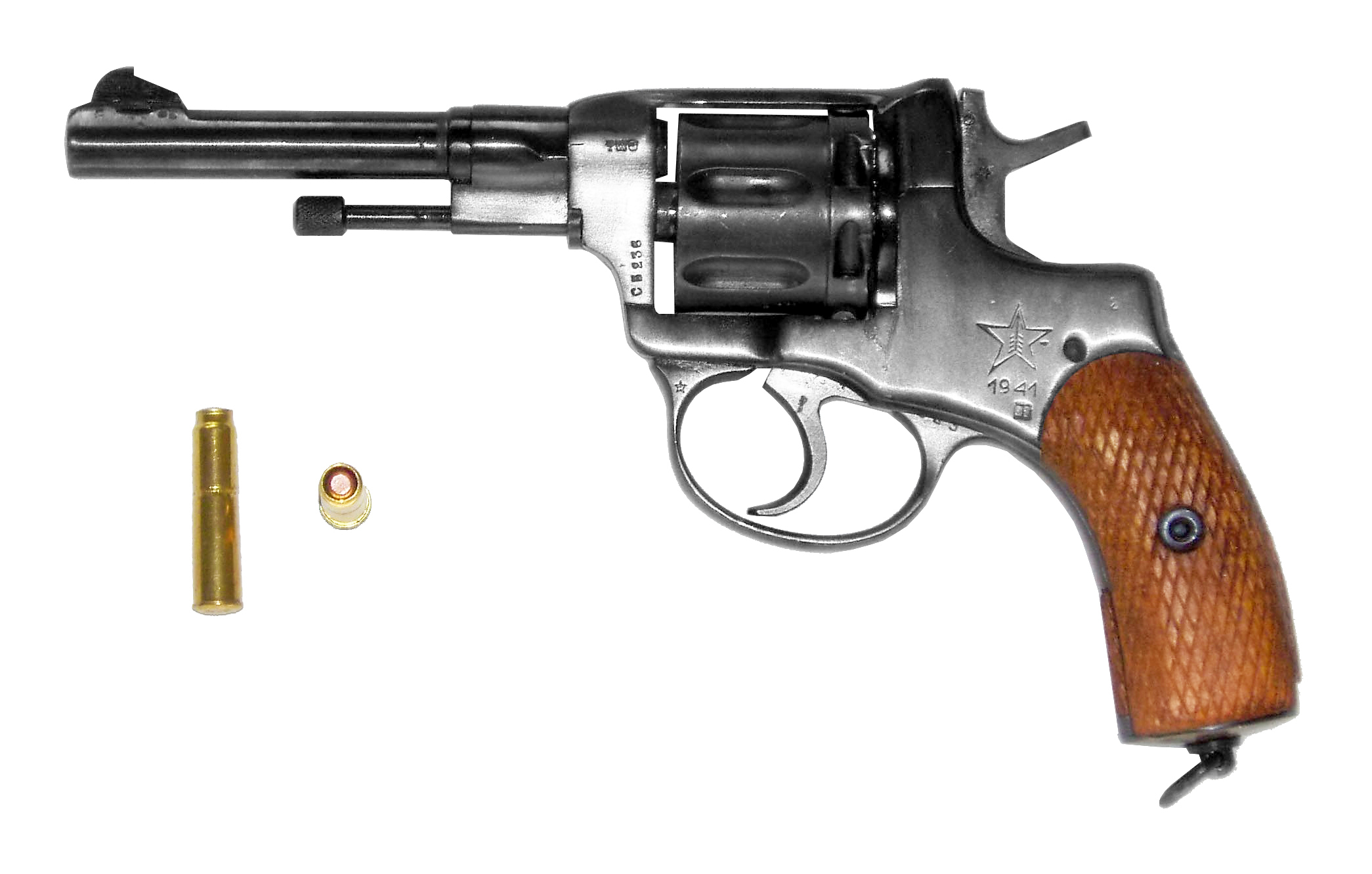
The Russian revolver Nagant M1895 is one of the symbols of Russian roulette.

The term Russian roulette was possibly first used in a 1937 short story of the same name by Georges Surdez, published in the January 30, 1937, edition of Collier's magazine:

'Did you ever hear of Russian Roulette?' When I said I had not, he told me all about it. When he was with the Russian army in Rumania, around 1917, and things were cracking up, so that their officers felt that they were not only losing prestige, money, family, and country, but were being also dishonored before their colleagues of the Allied armies, some officer would suddenly pull out his revolver, anywhere, at the table, in a café, at a gathering of friends, remove a cartridge from the cylinder, spin the cylinder, snap it back in place, put it to his head and pull the trigger. There were five chances to one that the hammer would set off a live cartridge and blow his brains all over the place.

References to the term in the context of the Collier's story appeared in some newspapers during 1937. The first independent appearances of the term in newspapers began in 1938 with the reports of young men being killed while playing it. The earliest instance appears to have been the death of a 21-year-old former journalism student in Austin, Texas, appearing in The Austin Statesman and some other Texas newspapers on January 8, 1938. At least four other deaths were attributed to Russian roulette during the year: a 34-year-old policeman in Peoria, Illinois, a 20-year-old in Houston, an 18-year-old in Saratoga Springs, New York, and a 16-year-old in Los Angeles.

The term has become a metaphor for taking foolhardy risks, and its usage steadily increased in reportage of diplomacy, politics, economics, medicine, and sports.

== Origin ==
An early example of Russian roulette can be found in the short story "The Fatalist" within the 1840 novel A Hero of Our Time written by Russian poet and writer Mikhail Lermontov. In the story, which is set in a Cossack village, the protagonist, Grigory Alexandrovich Pechorin, claims that there is no predestination and proposes a bet in order to prove it, laying about fifty gold pieces onto a table. A lieutenant of the dragoons of the Tsar, Vulič, a man of Serbian origins with a passion for gambling, accepts the challenge and randomly takes one of a number of pistols of various calibres from its nail, cocks it and pours gunpowder onto the pan. Nobody knows if the pistol is loaded or not. "Gentlemen! Who will pay 20 gold pieces for me?" Vulič asks, putting the muzzle of the pistol to his forehead. He then asks Grigory to throw a playing card in the air, and when the card lands, he pulls the trigger. The weapon fails to fire, but when Vulič cocks the pistol again and aims it at a service cap hanging over the window, a shot rings out and smoke fills the room.

== Incidents ==
- William Shockley, co-inventor of the transistor and winner of the Nobel Prize for Physics, claimed he attempted suicide by playing a solo game of Russian roulette.
- In a 1946 U.S. legal case, Commonwealth v. Malone, 47 A.2d 445 (1946), the Pennsylvania Supreme Court upheld a teenager's conviction for murder in the second degree as a result of shooting a friend. The teenagers played a modified version of Russian roulette called Russian poker, in which they took turns aiming and pulling the trigger of the revolver at each other, rather than at themselves. The court ruled that "When an individual commits an act of gross recklessness without regard to the probability that death to another is likely to result, that individual exhibits the state of mind required to uphold a conviction of manslaughter even if the individual did not intend for death to ensue."
- On 25 December 1954, American blues musician Johnny Ace killed himself in Texas, after a gun he pointed at his head discharged. A report in The Washington Post attributed this to Russian roulette, but it was disputed by two witnesses who said Ace was reckless with the gun but not playing Russian roulette.
- Graham Greene related in his first autobiography, A Sort of Life (1971), that he played Russian roulette alone a few times as a teenager.
- Malcolm X, in his 1965 autobiography, recalls an incident during his burglary career when he played Russian roulette, pulling the trigger three times to convince his partners in crime that he was not afraid to die. In the epilogue, Alex Haley states that Malcolm X revealed to him that he palmed the round. The incident is portrayed in Spike Lee's 1992 film adaptation of the autobiography.
- In 1972, under the influence of alcohol and cocaine, French singer and actor Johnny Hallyday played multiple games of Russian roulette with singer Nanette Workman, then his mistress. Laeticia Smet, Hallyday's wife, revealed in 2018 that he "has done this several times. But that was a long time ago ... At the time, he was playing with his destiny".
- On 24 July 1973, Dallas Police Officer Darrell L. Cain murdered Santos Rodriguez, a 12-year-old child, while interrogating him and his brother about a burglary. Cain shot Rodriguez after spinning the cylinder of his revolver, Russian roulette-style, in an effort to force a confession.
- On 10 September 1976, Finnish magician Aimo Leikas killed himself before a crowd while performing his Russian roulette act in Hartola. He had been performing the act for about a year, selecting six bullets from a box of assorted live and dummy ammunition.
- John Hinckley Jr., who attempted to assassinate President Ronald Reagan in 1981, was known to have played Russian roulette alone on two occasions.
- On 12 October 1984, while waiting for filming to resume on Cover Up (1985), actor Jon-Erik Hexum pretended to play Russian roulette in the mistaken belief that the blank with which the .44 Magnum revolver was loaded would render any shot harmless. The blast fractured his skull and caused massive cerebral hemorrhaging when bone fragments were forced through his brain. He was rushed to Beverly Hills Medical Center, where after five hours of surgery and six days in a coma, he was pronounced brain-dead.
- On 10 July 1993, former French rugby player Armand Vaquerin died during a “demonstration” of Russian roulette in the Béziers bar “le bar des Amis” on avenue Gambetta.
- In August or September of 1993, the CIA's top informant during the Operation Gothic Serpent had shot himself in the head playing a game of Russian Roulette.
- On 5 October 2003, psychological illusionist Derren Brown appeared to take part in a game of Russian roulette live on UK television. Two days later, a statement by the police said they were informed of the arrangements in advance, and were satisfied that "There was no live ammunition involved and at no time was anyone at risk." Hans Moretti performed a similar illusion in the 1970s, in which the gun was fired at him by his wife–assistant rather than himself.
- The BBC program Who Do You Think You Are?, on 13 September 2010, featured the actor Alan Cumming investigating his grandfather Tommy Darling, who he discovered had died playing Russian roulette while serving as a police officer in British Malaya. The family had previously believed he had died accidentally while cleaning his gun.
- On 11 June 2016, MMA fighter Ivan "JP" Cole apparently killed himself by playing Russian roulette.

== See also ==
- Counterphobic attitude
- Suicide
