= Englishry =

Concept in medieval English law

Englishry or, in Old French, Englescherie, is a legal name given, in medieval England, for the status of a person as an Englishman (i.e., as a commoner of native Anglo-Saxon stock rather than a member of the Anglo-Norman elite).

Specifically, presentment of Englishry refers to the establishment that a person slain was an Englishman rather than a Norman. If an unknown man was found slain, he was presumed to be a Norman, and the administrative district known as the hundred was fined accordingly, unless it could be proved that he was English. Englishry, if established, excused the hundred.

== Origins ==
It is thought that Danish invaders first introduced the practice in England and that the Norman conquerors preserved and revived it. W. Stubbs (Constitutional History, I p. 196) suggests such measures may have been taken by King Canute. It is not, however, mentioned in Glanvill's treatise, which is the earliest known treatise of medieval English law. There is no direct evidence of an earlier date than Bracton's 13th century legal treatise De Legibus. Attempts to prove that a murdered Norman was English were understandably frequent.

== Abolition ==
Engleschrie Act 1340
- Act of Parliament
- Parliament of England
- Long title: Presentment of Engleschrie shall be clearly extirpate.
- Citation: 14 Edw. 3 Stat. 1. c. 4
- Territorial extent: England and Wales; Ireland

Dates
- Royal assent: 1340
- Commencement: 12 July 1340 (Note: Start of session.)
- Repealed: England and Wales: 28 July 1863; Ireland: 10 August 1872

Other legislation
- Amended by: Statute Law Revision Act 1863
- Repealed by: England and Wales: Statute Law Revision Act 1863; Ireland: Statute Law (Ireland) Revision Act 1872

Status: Repealed

Text of statute as originally enacted

The practice was abolished with the Engleschrie Act 1340 (14 Edw. 3 Stat. 1. c. 4), an act of the Parliament of England.

The act was extended to Ireland by Poynings' Law 1495 (10 Hen. 7. c. 22 (I)).

The whole act was repealed for England and Wales by section 1 of, and the schedule to, the Statute Law Revision Act 1863 (26 & 27 Vict. c. 125), which came into force on 28 July 1863.

The whole act was repealed for Ireland by section 1 of, and the schedule to, the Statute Law (Ireland) Revision Act 1872 (35 & 36 Vict. c. 98), which came into force on 10 August 1872.

Though for some 200 years prior to abolition, it had no longer been possible reliably to distinguish Normans from Englishmen, the practice had continued because it was so profitable to the Crown, as only a small amount of the fine was allotted to the relatives of the murdered man.

== See also ==
- Murdrum
