= R v Cunningham =

English Court of Appeal ruling

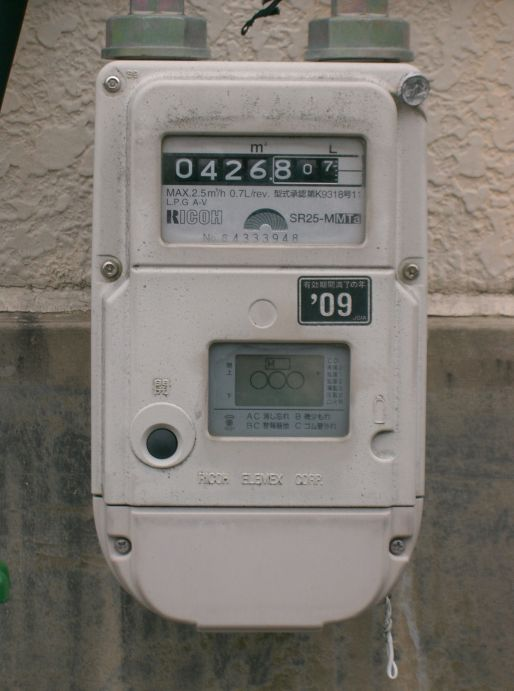
- Court: Court of Appeal
- Full case name: Regina v. Roy Cunningham
- Decided: 20 and 27 May 1957
- Citation: [1957] 3 WLR 76; 2 QB 396, 41 Crim. App. 155

Case history
- Prior action: Conviction at Leeds Crown Court (Assizes)

Court membership
- Judges sitting: Byrne J, Slade J, Barry J

Keywords
- Novus actus interveniens; causation

Regina v. Cunningham (1957) is an English Court of Appeal ruling that clarified that indirect, not reasonably foreseeable consequences to a totally distinct, reprehensible, even "wicked" activity would not be considered "malicious" where that is set out as the mens rea for a particular offence. The level of mens rea, by statute, specifically needed to accompany "administration", which it was common ground that negligent release would amount to, of noxious gases.

The precedent value of the case has been applied to broadly analogous situations and rules where an enhanced mens rea is required for a particular class of offence to be proven.

== Facts ==
The defendant removed a gas meter to steal the money inside. This was the unlawful, reprehensible activity for which a distinct charge and conviction applied. Gas then thus gradually leaked and partially asphyxiated a neighbour. He was charged with violating section 23 of the Offences against the Person Act 1861 that criminalised the unlawful and malicious administration of a noxious substance to another person.

== Trial judge understanding of law ==
The trial judge explained the word "maliciously" to mean general wickedness, and because of that as to stealing the money from the gas meter the mens rea for the crime was present.

== Objective foreseeability implied by maliciously ==
The appellate judges quashed the conviction because "maliciously" was to be read to mean that the result was a reasonably foreseeable consequence of the defendant's actions.

The panel gave vague, generic advice to judges as to the correct jury instructions to set down such as the proper standard (test) of probabilities (if any). Other cases give greater insight as to relevance of oblique, sufficiently proven, intentions and examples of motives which would be considered malicious for particular crimes having that specified mens rea.

Among these is R v Faulkner (1877) by which the mens rea for larceny must not be conflated with that for arson. However, he pled guilty to larceny, which meant theft, and was sentenced to 6 months in prison.
