= Crime of passion =

Violent crime triggered by a sudden impulse

A crime of passion (French: crime passionnel), in popular usage, refers to a violent crime, especially homicide, in which the perpetrator commits the act against someone because of sudden strong impulse such as anger or jealousy rather than as a premeditated crime. A high level of social and legal acceptance of crimes of passion has been historically associated with France from the 19th century to the 1970s, and until recently with South America.

== Description ==
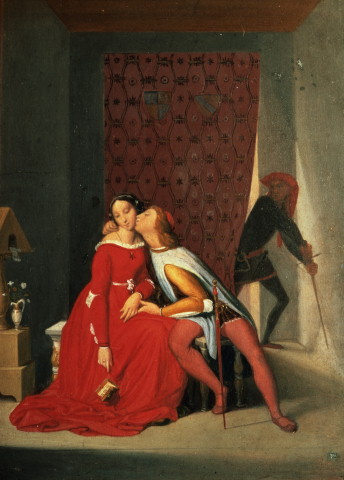
A love triangle featuring Paolo and Francesca da Rimini in The Divine Comedy (Dante Alighieri), depicted by Ingres

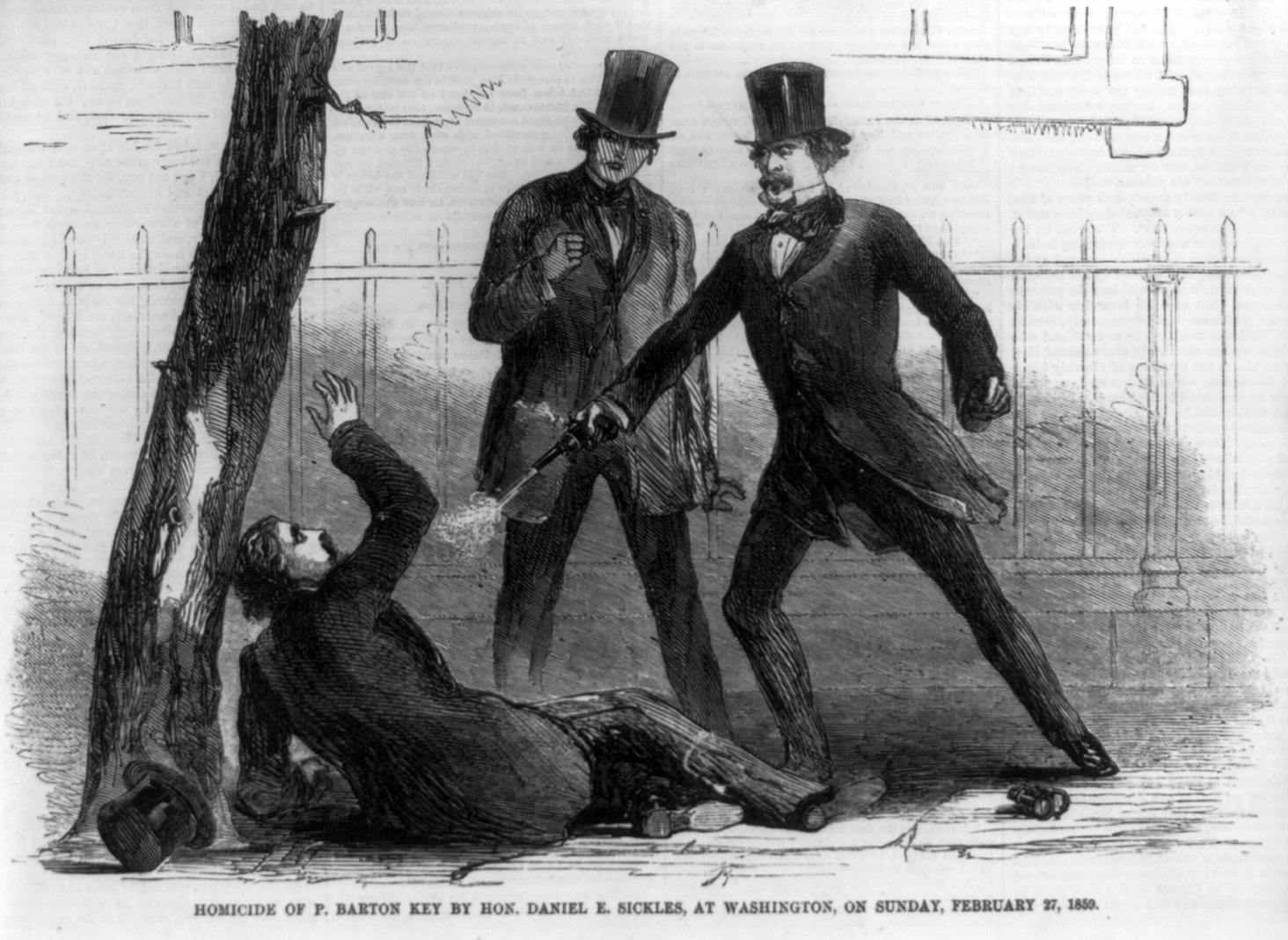
Sickles shoots Key in 1859.

The "crime of passion" defense challenges the mens rea element by suggesting that there was no malice aforethought, and instead the crime was committed in the "heat of passion". In some jurisdictions, a successful "crime of passion" defense may result in a conviction for manslaughter or second degree murder instead of first degree murder, because a defendant cannot ordinarily be convicted of first degree murder unless the crime was premeditated. A classic example of a crime of passion involves a spouse who, upon finding their partner in bed with another, kills the romantic interloper.

Additionally, the gay panic defense and or "trans panic" defenses can from time to time fall under the label of a "crime of passion", as was the defense of Michael Magidson and José Merel after they were put to trial after murdering trans woman Gwen Araujo.

In the United States, claims of "crimes of passion" have been traditionally associated with the defenses of temporary insanity or provocation. It was used as a defense in murder cases during the 1940s and 1950s. Historically, such defenses were used as complete defenses for various violent crimes, but gradually they became used primarily as a partial defense to a charge of murder; if the court accepts temporary insanity, a murder charge may be reduced to manslaughter.

In some countries, notably France, crime passionnel (or crime of passion) was a valid defense to murder charges. During the 19th century, some such cases resulted in a custodial sentence for the murderer of two years. After the Napoleonic Code was updated in the 1970s, paternal authority over the members of the family was ended, thus reducing the occasions for which crime passionnel could be claimed. The Canadian Department of Justice has described crimes of passion as "abrupt, impulsive, and unpremeditated acts of violence committed by persons, who have come face to face with an incident unacceptable to them, and who are rendered incapable of self-control for the duration of the act."

Crimes of passion were widely accepted in Southern United States states, especially in Texas. Texas, unlike most other states, did not only tolerate such crimes, but had a law which codified such killings as justifiable. Until 1973, Texas had a law which stated: "Homicide is justifiable when committed by the husband upon one taken in the act of adultery with the wife, provided that the killing takes place before the parties to the act have separated. Such circumstance cannot justify a homicide where it appears that there has been, on the part of the husband, any connivance or assent to the adulterous connection." This law was repealed in 1973 by Senate Bill 34 during the 63rd Regular Session of the Texas Legislature.

== Advocacy ==
In recent decades, feminists and women's rights organizations have worked to change laws and social norms which tolerate crimes of passion against women. UN Women has urged states to review legal defenses of passion and provocation, and other similar laws, to ensure that such laws do not lead to impunity in regard to violence against women, stating that "laws should clearly state that these defenses do not include or apply to crimes of "honour", adultery, or domestic assault or murder."

The Council of Europe Recommendation Rec(2002)5 of the Committee of Ministers to member states on the protection of women against violence states that member states should "preclude adultery as an excuse for violence within the family".

There are differences between crimes of passion (which are generally impulsive and committed by and against both genders) and honour killings, as "while crimes of passion may be seen as somewhat premeditated to a certain extent, honour killings are usually deliberate, well planned and premeditated acts when a person kills a female relative ostensibly to uphold his honour." However, Widney Brown, advocacy director for Human Rights Watch, argued that "crimes of passion have a similar dynamic in that the women are killed by male family members and the crimes are perceived as excusable or understandable". Some human rights advocates say that the crimes of passion in Latin America are treated leniently. Crimes of passion and honor killings often have similar triggers, particularly related to the sexual behavior (real or imaginary) of the victim, such as extramarital sex, premarital sex or homosexuality; and there have been accusations that the Western media creates artificial differentiation between the 'foreign' forms of domestic violence, such as the honor killings that are most prevalent in the Middle East and South Asia, and the crimes of passion that are relatively common in North America, Europe and Latin America.

The Council of Europe Convention on preventing and combating violence against women and domestic violence, the first legally binding international document on domestic violence, states at Article 42:

Article 42 – Unacceptable justifications for crimes, including crimes committed in the name of so-called honor

1. Parties shall take the necessary legislative or other measures to ensure that, in criminal proceedings initiated following the commission of any of the acts of violence covered by the scope of this Convention, culture, custom, religion, tradition, or so-called honor shall not be regarded as justification for such acts. This covers, in particular, claims that the victim has transgressed cultural, religious, social, or traditional norms or customs of appropriate behavior.

2. Parties shall take the necessary legislative or other measures to ensure that incitement by any person of a child to commit any of the acts referred to in paragraph 1 shall not diminish the criminal liability of that person for the acts committed.

In recent years, advocacy and legal reform has focused on several areas of laws:

- repealing provisions which explicitly provided for mitigation or acquittal in crimes of passion (most such provisions focused on husbands killing wives due to adultery and fathers killing daughters due to premarital sex, e.g. such a law existed in Italy until 1981 - see below)
- reforming self defense laws by ensuring that vague wording does not lead to broad interpretation of the concept, such as the self-defense of family honor or reputation; according to UNWOMEN, "Drafters should scrutinize self-defense provisions for vagueness that leaves open to interpretation whether the harm includes injury to "honour". Wording such as "dangerous or unjust act" are vague and leave open to judicial discretion whether such self-defense provisions apply to "honour" crimes".
- reforming insanity related defenses, such as insanity, temporary insanity, irresistible impulse, diminished responsibility and other similar defenses to ensure that such defenses refer to genuine psychiatric medical conditions or genuine inability to comprehend due to objective factors (such as inhaling toxic fumes) and are not used as a legal fiction meant to justify domestic murders.
- reforming the provocation defense, particularly with regard to the triggers that can be claimed. For example, Canada has modified its provocation law in 2015, restricting its use, such that the provocative behavior of the victim must constitute a criminal offense punishable by 5 or more years (rather than just "insult").

== Crimes of passion and attitudes towards women ==
Crimes of passion are often committed against women due to beliefs about female sexuality and are often present in societies dominated by strong double standards related to male and female sexual behaviors, particularly related to premarital sex and adultery. Indeed, with regard to adultery, many societies, such as Latin American countries, have been dominated by very strong double standards regarding male and female adultery, with the latter being seen as a much more serious violation. Such ideas were also supported by laws in the West; for example, in the UK, before 1923, a man could divorce solely on the wife's adultery, but a woman had to prove additional fault (e.g., adultery and cruelty). Similarly, passion defenses to domestic murders were often available to men who killed unfaithful wives, but not to women who killed unfaithful husbands (France's crime of passion law, that was in force until 1975, is an example). In traditional societies, women could not complain about mistresses, concubines, and in many cultures even other wives (such as polygyny); whereas male sexual jealousy was recognized as the highest emotion that could justify even murder. Similarly, crimes of passion legislation made reference to fathers killing their daughters, but not sons, for premarital sex (such as Italy's law that was in effect until 1981); or Philippines's law that continues to be in effect to this day (see Art. 247 called Death or physical injuries inflicted under exceptional circumstances.). With regard to Philippines, this double standard is also seen in the crimes dealing with extramarital sex, which are defined differently for women and men, and punished more severely for women (see Articles 333 and 334).

Historically, some societies considered homicide committed by a wife against her husband as a more severe crime than homicide committed by a husband against his wife. This was the case in the UK, where, under English law, until 1828, homicide committed against a social superior, which included a wife killing her husband, was classified as petty treason and was a crime more severe than murder, because it was seen as threatening the hierarchical social order. In England and Wales, petty treason ceased to be a distinct offence from murder by virtue of the Offences against the Person Act 1828. It was abolished in Ireland in 1829.

In the Roman Empire the Roman law Lex Julia de adulteriis coercendis implemented by Augustus Caesar in 18 BC permitted the killing of daughters and their lovers who committed adultery at the hands of their fathers and also permitted the killing of the adulterous wife's lover at the hand of her husband.

== Crimes of passion and juries ==
The role of juries in trials of crimes of passion is controversial. In Brazil especially, there have been concerns that the jury system is deeply flawed, both due to the bias of juries, and due to the legal framework, which gives immense power to juries, and there is little that can be done even in jury decisions that are in blatant violation of the law. In Brazil, though there was an explicit right of a man to kill his wife and her lover upon finding them in the act of adultery, this right was abolished in 1830. Nevertheless, acquittals in cases of men killing their wives have been very common throughout the 19th and 20th century, and have happened even in the 21st century. Men have been acquitted for killing wives due to a variety of reasons, including infidelity, attempting to leave the relationship, and refusing to have sex. In 1991, the Supreme Court ruled that the so-called legitimate defense of honor, used in these trials, has no basis in Brazilian law. Nevertheless, the legitimate defense of honor has continued to be used, including in a 2017 case of attempted murder where a man was acquitted for stabbing his ex-wife. The Supreme Court upheld the acquittal on the basis that the decision of a jury is sovereign and may not be altered. In 2021, the Supreme Court was asked to analyze the legitimate defense of honor, and ruled that the defense is not part of Brazilian law, reiterating the 1991 decision, and also ruled that this defense is unconstitutional; the ruling provided for the possibly of the prosecution to contest the decision of the jury on the basis that it is void if such defense has been used, with the final ruling being affirmed in 2023. The Supreme Court unanimously considered that the legitimate defense of honor is contrary to the principles of gender equality, human dignity and protection of life provided for in the Constitution of Brazil, for which reason it prohibited its direct or indirect use during trials. It is still not clear how and whether the prohibition of this defense can be implemented. Legal experts and politicians have expresses serious concerns of the way juries operate in Brazil, calling the legal organization anachronistic. According to a criminal court judge:

"The popular jury trials for murder leave the prosecutor with no recourse. He can appeal a jury verdict or a sentence and be supported by the higher court, as in Lopes, but each case returns to the state jury tribunal...In this jury system the jury decides according to its conscience not according to the law."

A study prepared for the National Council on the Rights of Women found that:

"[the jury] "doesn't evaluate the crime in itself, but instead evaluates the victim and the accused's life, trying to show how adapted each one is to what they imagine should be the correct behavior for a husband and wife....The man can always be acquitted if the defense manages to convince the jury that he was a good and honest worker, a dedicated father and husband, while the woman was unfaithful and did not fulfill her responsibilities as a housewife and mother....This way the ones involved in the crime are judged distinctly. Men and women are attributed different roles, in a pattern that excludes citizenship and equality of rights."

Brazil is not the only country where there are or have been controversies about juries in crimes of passion cases; the ability of juries to return fair verdicts in crimes of passion in the French Third Republic was a major issue. In India, it was a crime of passion that led to the abolition of jury trials, after a man was acquitted by a jury for killing his wife's lover.

== By country ==
=== Argentina ===
In Argentina, crimes of passion are treated seriously and the Penal Code of Argentina provides harsh punishments for killing a romantic or sexual partner under the aggravating factor of vínculo (bond) between the victim and the perpetrator. If the accused is found guilty without mitigating factors, the only possible sentence for this aggravated type of homicide is life imprisonment.

The sentence of life imprisonment can be mitigated by mental defect (even if legally sane) and others such as heavy influence of negative emotions, which is known as emoción violenta (violent emotion).

=== Australia ===
In Australia, as in other common law jurisdictions, crimes of passion have traditionally been subjected to the partial defense of provocation, which converts what would have been murder into manslaughter. In the early 21st Century, the defence of provocation came under increased criticism, and, as a result, legal changes have abolished or restricted its application: in 2003, Tasmania became the first state to abolish the partial defence of provocation in murder charges; the next state to abolish it was Victoria, in 2005; followed by Western Australia in 2008; and by South Australia in 2020. ACT and Northern Territory have amended the laws to exclude non-violent homosexual sexual advances, in 2004 and 2006, respectively. In Queensland the partial defense of provocation in section 304(1) of the Criminal Code was amended in 2011, in order to "reduce the scope of the defence being available to those who kill out of sexual possessiveness or jealousy". In 2014, the New South Wales law on provocation was amended to provide that the provocative conduct of the deceased must also have constituted a serious indictable offense.

=== Brazil ===
Killing of wives due to adultery has been traditionally treated very leniently in Brazil, in court cases where husbands claimed the "legitimate defense of their honor" (legitima defesa da honra) as justification for the killing. Although this defense was not explicitly stipulated in the 20th-century Criminal Code, it has been successfully pleaded by lawyers throughout the 20th century, in particular in the countryside, though less so in the coastal big cities. In 1991 Brazil's Supreme Court explicitly rejected the "honor defense" as having no basis in Brazilian law.

In the 21st century, Brazil has improved the legal status of women, with the new Civil Code of 2002; and through other legal changes such as repealing in 2005 the provision that exempted a rapist from punishment if he married his victim, and enacting laws against domestic violence in Brazil.

=== France ===
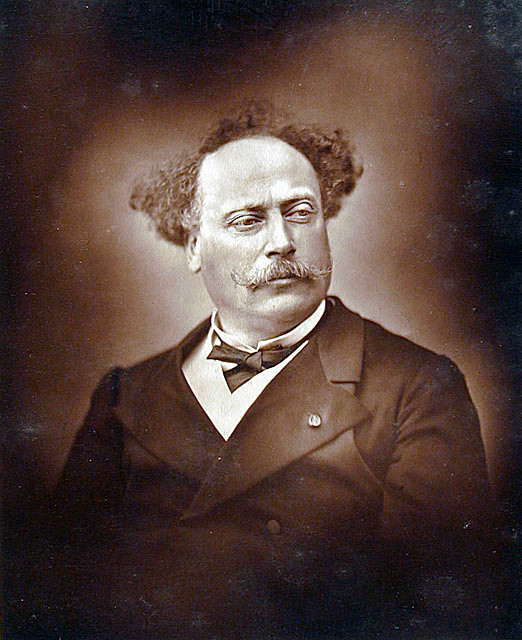
French literature of the 19th century often justified crimes of passion, as is the case of writer Alexandre Dumas fils, and influenced the views of the upper classes, including those sitting on juries, about such homicides.

Crimes of passion have a strong association with France. Prior to 1975, the French Penal Code of 1810 stated at article 324 that "in the case of adultery, provided for by article 336, murder committed upon the wife as well as upon her accomplice, at the moment when the husband shall have caught them in the fact, in the house where the husband and wife dwell, is excusable" [meaning a punishment of 1 to 5 years, according to article 326]. In practice, however, many domestic violence crimes resulted in acquittal by the juries, which alarmed jurists and led them to question whether the citizen jurors of the Third Republic were competent to render justice. In the 1960s and 70s the attitudes towards domestic violence started to change, as in other European countries. On November 7, 1975, Law no. 617/75 Article 17 repealed Article 324. Many countries, including some western countries like Belgium, were legally influenced by the Article 324. Prior to 1997, Belgian law provided for mitigating circumstances in the case of a killing or assault against a spouse caught in the act of adultery. In Luxembourg, Article 413 (repealed in 2003) provided mitigating circumstances for murder, assault and injury of an adulterous spouse.

Article 324 of the French penal code was copied by Middle Eastern Arab countries. According to the Honour Based Violence Awareness Network, the penal codes that were enacted under the Napoleonic Empire influenced the development of laws in North Africa and the Middle East. These laws permit reduced sentences for murders that are "related to honour". The French Article 324 inspired Jordan's Article 340 and Article 98. The 1858 Ottoman Penal Code's Article 188 was also inspired by Article 324. Both the French Article 324 and Ottoman article 188 were drawn on to create Jordan's Article 340, which was retained after a 1944 revision of laws, and still applies to this day.

The Napoleonic Code has been an extremely influential code. Many laws around the world have been modeled on it. The code was applied to all territories under Napoleon's control and has also influenced several other countries in Europe and South America. In addition to leniency to crimes of passion, this code enshrined the unquestionable authority of men over their families and deprived women of any individual rights, and reduced the rights of illegitimate children. It also reintroduced colonial slavery. The example of the Napoleonic Code is often used in debates about Westernization, Europeanization and imperialism. The Napoleonic Code was also influential in the "marry-your-rapist laws" (in force in France until 1994), which were exported to other parts of the world too.

France also had a strong culture of dueling meant to uphold honor, and France was called by National Geographic "the dueling capital of Europe". This dueling culture was also exported to Latin America, and was extremely strong in Uruguay (see below the section on Uruguay). In Corsica, a place influenced throughout the centuries both by Italian and French culture, there was a strong custom of vendetta, which required Corsicans to kill anyone who wronged their family honor. Between 1821 and 1852, no fewer than 4,300 vendetta killings were perpetrated in Corsica.

Stories about adulterous women, suicides and homicides committed due to 'passion', featured prominently in French literature in the 19th century, and "In literature as in life, unconventional women needed to be severely punished lest their defiant attitudes inspire further acts of rebellion".

=== Haiti ===
Haiti, a former French colony, had a crime of passion law similar to that of France until 2005, when it was abolished. Adultery was also decriminalized in 2005.

=== Italy ===
Italy has a long tradition of treating crimes of passion with leniency. Until 1981, the law read: "Art. 587: He who causes the death of a spouse, daughter, or sister upon discovering her in illegitimate carnal relations and in the heat of passion caused by the offence to his honour or that of his family will be sentenced to three to seven years. The same sentence shall apply to whom, in the above circumstances, causes the death of the person involved in illegitimate carnal relations with his spouse, daughter, or sister."

=== Portugal ===
Portugal has a long tradition of tolerating, and even encouraging, crimes of passion, under the "legitimate defense of honor", which was also brought to Brazil. During the authoritarian Estado Novo regime, (1933–1974) women's rights were restricted. Although improvements in tackling domestic violence have been achieved, particularly with legal reforms in 1982, lenient punishments continue to be given by judges, partly due to the strongly patriarchal ideology that still persists in the judicial system. Although the Supreme Court of Justice in recent years has, in most cases, rejected the defense of "passion" in domestic homicides, such defense remains open to use due to the legal framework of murder in Portuguese law, namely article 133. This article is very broad in scope, is subject to interpretation, and has a very low punishment of only 1 to 5 years, which due to the regulations of the Portuguese Penal Code, usually results in suspended sentences. This article, called "Privileged homicide" (Homicídio privilegiado) states that when the murder takes place under an understandable violent emotion, compassion, despair or other socially or morally relevant motive, such as to significantly diminish the murderer's degree of guilt, the punishment in this case is 1 to 5 years. Furthermore, the Criminal Code under Articles 71 and 72, provides guidelines to sentencing for crimes, making reference to honorabale motives and provocation by the victim. The international GREVIO expert body which is responsible for monitoring the implementation of the Istanbul Convention by the State Parties (which include Portugal) has called on the Portuguese authorities to reform the Criminal Code, to ensure that it is compatible with article 42 of the convention, which states that "Parties shall take the necessary legislative or other measures to ensure that, in criminal proceedings initiated following the commission of any of the acts of violence covered by the scope of this Convention, culture, custom, religion, tradition or so‐called “honour” shall not be regarded as justification for such acts. This covers, in particular, claims that the victim has transgressed cultural, religious, social or traditional norms or customs of appropriate behaviour."

Portugal was one of the last European countries to decriminalize adultery - the adultery law (which treated female and male adultery differently) was repealed in 1982, and the punishment for female adultery in the 20th century in Portugal was one of the most severe in the Western world. With regard to homicide law, before 1975, the law provided for a symbolic punishment of only 6 months exile from the district for killing of a spouse or daughter under 21 caught in the act of adultery/premarital sex. The Decree-Law 262/75 on 27 May 1975 repealed article 372 of the Penal Code which provided for such mitigation; nevertheless courts continued to routinely use general mitigation factors to give lenient punishments for husbands who killed out of jealousy or relationship breakup throughout the 1980s and 1990s; the concept of holding women as partly responsible for crimes committed against them extended to other crimes too, such as rape and kidnapping; for example in 1989 the Portuguese Supreme Court of Justice ruled that two hitchhiking young tourists who were kidnapped and raped had contributed to the crimes committed against them. It was only in the 21st century that a different attitude started to be more commonly adopted by the courts, as public and political discourse against of domestic violence started to grow.

=== United Kingdom ===
Killing due to adultery traditionally fell under the provocation defense. In 1707, English Lord Chief Justice John Holt described the act of a man having sexual relations with another man's wife as "the highest invasion of property" and claimed, in regard to the aggrieved husband, that "a man cannot receive a higher provocation".

In 2009 a man was cleared of murder but convicted of manslaughter by reason of provocation for stabbing his partner and his best friend to death when he found them having sex.

Although provocation in English law was abolished on 4 October 2010 by section 56(1) of the Coroners and Justice Act 2009, it was replaced by a relatively similar by more narrowly drafted defence of "loss of control" created by section 54.

There has been considerable controversy regarding the application by the courts of the new law; although section 55 states "(6) In determining whether a loss of self-control had a qualifying trigger (...) (c) the fact that a thing done or said constituted sexual infidelity is to be disregarded", in a controversial decision by Lord Judge in R v Clinton in the Court of Appeal, Lord Judge interpreted the new offence as allowing for sexual infidelity to count under the third prong of the new defence (see Baker and Zhao 2012). This decision has received heavy criticism from academics. Vera Baird has also been very critical of the decision, writing, "It seems that parliament says infidelity doesn't count and the court says it does."

=== Uruguay ===
In Uruguay, crimes of passion were legally tolerated until 2017. In certain circumstances, the law exonerated a perpetrator when a killing or a battery was committed due to "passion provoked by adultery". Article 36 of the Criminal Code provided for this:

"Artículo 36. (La pasión provocada por el adulterio)

La pasión provocada por el adulterio faculta al Juez para exonerar de pena por los delitos de homicidio y de lesiones, siempre que concurran los requisitos siguientes:

1. Que el delito se cometa por el cónyuge que sorprendiera infraganti al otro cónyuge y que se efectúe o contra el amante.
2. Que el autor tuviera buenos antecedentes y que la oportunidad para cometer el delito no hubiera sido provocada o simplemente facilitada, mediando conocimiento anterior de la infidelidad conyugal."

Translation:

"Article 36. (The passion provoked by adultery)

The passion provoked by adultery empowers the court to exempt from punishment for the crimes of homicide and injury, provided that the following conditions are present:

1. The offense is committed by one spouse against the other spouse whom he or she has caught in the act, or against the lover.
2. The perpetrator has a good record and the opportunity to commit the crime was not provoked or facilitated by prior knowledge of the marital infidelity."

Since 2013, there have been ongoing political efforts to remove this provision from the Criminal Code. On December 22, 2017, Article 36 of the Criminal Code was modified to remove the crime of passion.

Uruguay is a country where the case of violence against women has been considered a paradox and debated in the context that Uruguay is otherwise considered one of the most liberal countries in Latin America; nevertheless, domestic violence is a very serious problem; according to a 2018 United Nations study, Uruguay has the second-highest rate of killings of women by current or former partners in Latin America, after Dominican Republic. Despite having a reputation of being a progressive country, Uruguay has lagged behind with regard to its approach to domestic violence; for example, in Chile, considered one of the most socially conservative countries of the region, a similar legislation permitting such crimes of passion was repealed in 1953.

The culture of Uruguay has been strongly influenced by French culture, through French immigrants in the 19th century (see French Uruguayans), and, as such, the French concept of crime of passion was brought to Uruguay (see section above on France). The French dueling culture, meant to uphold honor, was also exported to Latin America, and was extremely strong in Uruguay. Uruguay's honor culture has been prominent well into the 20th century, and duels survived in Uruguay until the 1970s, long after the practice had been abandoned in other parts of the Western world. Duels in Uruguay were widespread in the early 20th century, were legalized in 1920, in an unusual political move; and remained legal until 1992.

== Examples ==
=== Argentina ===
- Susana Freydoz
- Nahir Galarza
- Carlos Monzón

=== France ===
- Henriette Caillaux
- Albert Lemaître

=== United Kingdom ===
- Douglas Malcolm

=== United States ===
- Lorena Bobbitt
- Mary Jo Buttafuoco
- Death of Steve McNair
- Lisa Nowak
- Murder of Nikki Whitehead
- Murder of David Lynn Harris
- John Wayne Gacy

== See also ==
- Catathymic crisis
- Domestic violence
- Honor killing
- Murder–suicide
- Voluntary manslaughter
