= Malice aforethought =

Legal term

Malice aforethought is the "premeditation" or "predetermination" (with malice) required as an element of some crimes in some jurisdictions and a unique element for first-degree or aggravated murder in a few. Insofar as the term is still in use, it has a technical meaning that has changed substantially over time.

== Etymology ==
The term malice aforethought is a direct translation of the Law French term malice prépensée, so the adjective follows the noun as in French.

== Legal history ==
This [malice aforethought] is the grand criterion, which now distinguishes murder from other killing: and this malice prepense, malitia praecogitata, is not so properly spite or malevolence to the deceased in particular, as any evil design in general; the dictate of a wicked, depraved, and malignant heart: un disposition a faire un male chose [an inclination to do an evil thing]: and it may be either express or implied in law.

— William Blackstone, Commentaries on the Laws of England, vol. 4

Malice aforethought was not an element of murder in early medieval English law cases. Both self-defence killings and death by misadventure were treated as murder by juries. Although pardons for self-defence became common after the Statute of Gloucester was passed in 1278, the jury in a 14th-century case still found that a self-defence killing was felonious.

In the 12th century, any death by misadventure without a "presentment of Englishry" was sufficient for a jury finding of murder, even in cases where there was no suspect and the victim's identity was unknown. The murder fine was levied in these cases under the Laws of Henry I until 1267, when the fine for death by misadventure was abolished by the Statute of Marlborough during the baronial reform movement. The primary meaning of murdurum continued to be murder fine until the fine was abolished by the Engleschrie Act 1340 (14 Edw. 3 Stat. 1. c. 4).

The first statutory mention of malice aforethought dates to the reign of Richard II in 1389. In 1390, Parliament defined murder as "death of a man slain by await, assault, or malice prepensed". Henceforth, juries were instructed to consider whether a felony had been committed with malice aforethought. A 1403 jury instruction recorded in a 16th-century manuscript written by Edward Stillingfleet reads:

Also you will inquire about all sorts of homicides both of those who lie in wait through malice aforethought [par malice devant pourpense] in the peace of homes and other places [and who] murder people and of those who slay men through a hot-blooded mêlée [chaude melle].

Some scholars have identified concepts from Anglo-Saxon law as the origin for malice aforethought, but the connection is disputed. The Anglo-Saxon legal concept of forsteal included lying in wait and ambush, but it remains unclear whether or not premeditation or intent were requirements for murder during this early period. It has been argued that forsteal became agwait purpense in medieval English law, which was also called agwait premeditatus in Latin.

In 1552, malice aforethought is applied as a requirement for murder in Thomas Buckler's Case. Malice aforethought emerges as an ill-defined concept from the writings of Blackstone, Joseph Chitty and their predecessors, Matthew Hale, and Edward Coke.

=== Distinguished from manslaughter ===
After the Norman Conquest, common law courts began to distinguish murders from homicides that occur during sudden brawls. Over centuries, this distinction evolved into an early form of the doctrine of provocation that distinguishes murder from voluntary manslaughter. By the time the Statute of Stabbing was passed in 1604, judges had started to consider whether provocation was sufficient in "heat of the blood" cases. During the 17th century, this was more clearly articulated in subsequent cases and gradually developed into the common law categorical test for provocation. The Statute of Stabbing had removed the benefit of clergy for cases where there was a killing without provocation.

=== Early American law ===
Malice aforethought was the mens rea element of murder in the 19th-century United States, and remains as a relic in those states with a separate first-degree murder charge.

As of 1891, Texas courts were overwhelmed with discussing whether "malice" needs to be expressed or implied in the judge's jury instructions. However, the 1970s revision of the Texas Penal Code states that a murder must be committed "intentionally or knowingly" in Texas.

== Modern law ==
=== England ===
In English law, the mens rea requirement of murder is either an intention to kill or an intention to cause grievous bodily harm. In R v Moloney [1985], Lord Bridge held that intent, as defined in the mens rea requirement of murder, 'means intent', so the jury should simply use the term intent legally as they would in normal parlance. Furthermore, he held that for the defendant to have the mens rea of murder, there must be something more than mere foresight or knowledge that death or serious injury is a "natural" consequence of the current activities: there must be clear evidence of an intention. This element of intention is fulfilled when the defendant's motive or purpose was to cause death or serious bodily harm (also known as 'direct intent') but also when the defendant's motive or purpose was not to cause death or grievous bodily harm but (as held by Lord Steyn in R v Woollin) death or serious bodily harm was a 'virtual certainty' of the defendant's act, and the defendant appreciated that to be so (also known as 'oblique intent').

=== United States ===
In most common law jurisdictions, the American Law Institute's Model Penal Code, and in the various U.S. state statutes, which have codified homicide definitions, the term has been abandoned or substantially revised. The four states of mind that are now recognized as constituting "malice aforethought" in murder prosecutions are as follows:

1. intent to kill
2. intent to inflict serious bodily injury
3. extremely reckless disregard for the value of human life
4. felony murder rule

Since there are 4 different states of mind of malice aforethought, it can be hard to find the differences. It is easiest to break these categories up by premeditation, express malice and reckless endangerment, or implied malice. Intent to kill or to inflict serious bodily injury would be considered express malice. This does not mean that the accused made a plan far in advance, but it could even be in the moment of the crime. If the person did the action knowing it would hurt or kill the other person, there was express malice involved, which is a form of malice aforethought.

As stated above, malice aforethought does not require that the person accused premeditated to hurt a person, but that they knew their actions could lead to someone's harm. This is implied malice, which requires that a person knowingly did an act that they knew was dangerous, and acted without concern for other people's safety, even if not premeditated. Hence, intention can also be found where the perpetrator acts with gross recklessness showing lack of care for human life, commonly referred to as "depraved-heart murder", which can be treated as second-degree murder due to the presence of implied malice. Lastly, murder committed during the commission of or while in flight from a felony or attempted felony is termed felony murder.

Notably, the principle of transferred intent causes an accused who intended to kill one person but inadvertently killed another instead to remain guilty of murder. The intent to kill the first person suffices.

=== Australia ===
Malice aforethought, also known as mens rea, is still used in the criminal justice system today when trialing for murder. The term is a catch-all phrase that encompasses all the states of mind that are sufficient mens rea for murder. Most Australian jurisdictions require some degree of actual awareness of the resulting consequences of the accused's own actions to justify a murder conviction. The High Court of Australia affirmed that there is a spectrum of mens rea ranging from intention to kill to reckless indifference that would be relevant in securing a murder conviction. However, the High Court ruled that it was not necessary to prove malice aforethought in a manslaughter conviction. The Full Court of the Supreme Court of Victoria distinguished between the two classes of manslaughter. They were manslaughter by reckless indifference and manslaughter by criminal negligence in R v Nydam in which malice aforethought was definitively ruled out as an element in a charge of manslaughter by criminal negligence.
