= Voluntary manslaughter =

Homicide criminal charge

Voluntary manslaughter is the killing of a human in which the offender acted in the heat of passion, a state that would cause a reasonable person to become emotionally or mentally disturbed to the point that they cannot reasonably control their emotions. Voluntary manslaughter is one of two main types of manslaughter, the other being involuntary manslaughter.

== Provocation ==
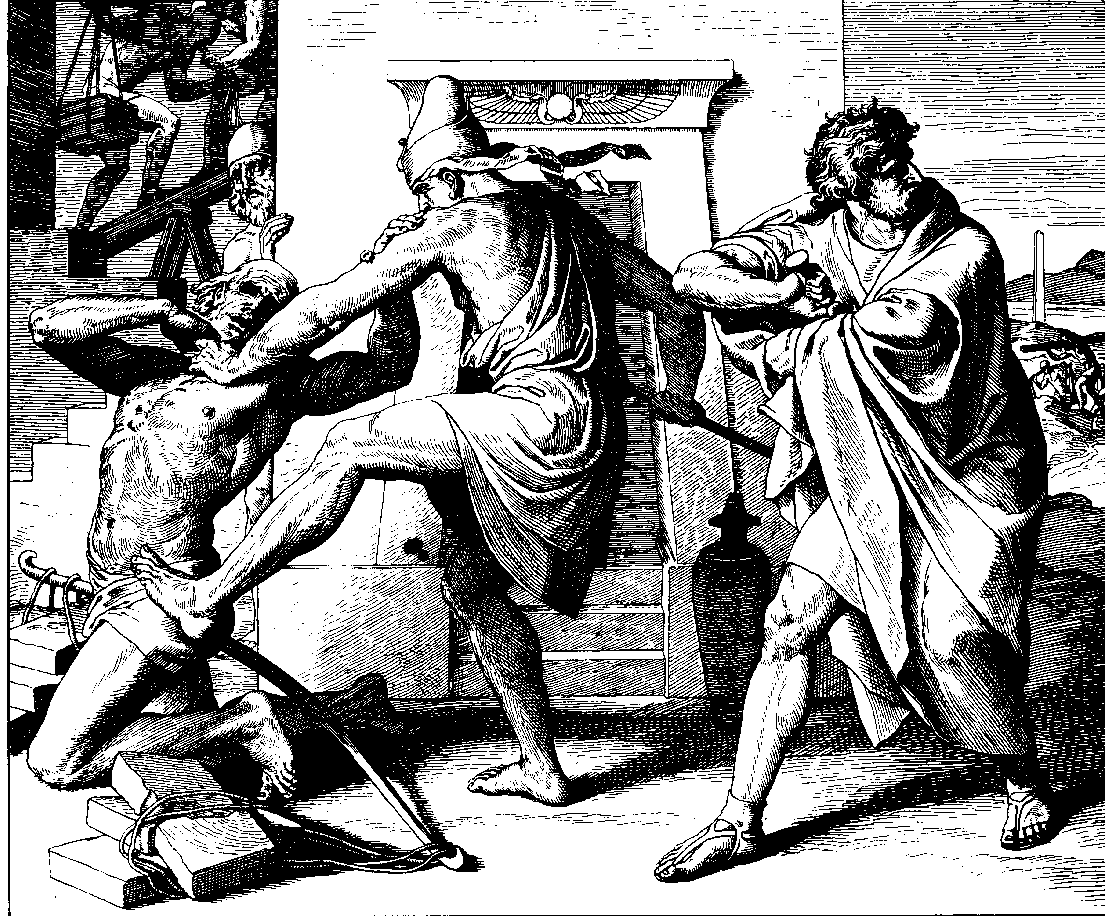
An 1860 woodcut by Julius Schnorr von Carolsfeld

Provocation consists of the reasons for which one person kills another. "Adequate" or "reasonable" provocation is what makes the difference between voluntary manslaughter and murder. Provocation is said to be adequate if it would cause a reasonable person to lose self-control.

== State of mind ==
=== Intent to kill ===
Voluntary manslaughter requires the same intent as murder. The charge of murder is reduced to manslaughter when the defendant's culpability for the crime is "negated" or mitigated by adequate provocation.

=== Imperfect self-defense ===
In some jurisdictions, malice can also be negated by imperfect self-defense, the principle that an honest but unreasonable belief that it is necessary to defend oneself from imminent peril to life or great bodily injury negates malice aforethought, the mental element necessary for a murder charge, so that the chargeable offense is reduced to manslaughter. Self-defense is considered imperfect when extenuating circumstances exist that are insufficient to constitute a complete legal defense to homicide, but nonetheless partially excuse the act that resulted in death.

== United States ==
=== Model Penal Code ===
The United States' Model Penal Code (MPC) does not use the common law language of voluntary and involuntary manslaughter. Under the MPC, a homicide that would otherwise be murder is reduced to manslaughter when committed "under the influence of extreme mental or emotional disturbance for which there is a reasonable explanation or excuse". Several court decisions in various jurisdictions have interpreted this language broadly by creating a subjective standard to determine whether the provocation was adequate from the defendant's point of view. This subjective standard diverges substantially from the common law reasonable person test and allows the jury greater latitude.

For example, in State v. Dumlao, the court interpreted the MPC language broadly, holding that reasonableness should be evaluated from the defendant's perspective. The subjective standard for whether a provocation was reasonable, and thus adequate, would allow a jury to consider Dumlao's "mental abnormalities", including a medical diagnosis of "paranoid personality disorder".

=== Case law ===
United States criminal case law Other MPC
Case name	Year	Citation	State	Doctrine	Court's decision
People v. Valentine	1946	28 Cal.2d 121	CA	Heat of passion; mere words	Resolved a century long split in California courts, holding that mere words could be adequate provocation
People v. Berry	1976	18 Cal.3d 509	CA	Heat of passion	Taunting or provocation over a prolonged period can be adequate provocation
State v. Dumlao	1986	715 P.2d 822	HI	Extreme emotional disturbance	Under the MPC, the reasonable person test for adequate provocation uses a subjective standard to be evaluated from defendant's viewpoint
People v. Chevalier	1989	544 N.E.2d 942	IL	Mere words	Verbal admission of infidelity is not adequate provocation
State v. Shane	1993	590 N.E.2d 272	OH	Mere words	Verbal admission of infidelity is not adequate provocation
