= Provocation (law) =

Criminal act resulting from loss of self control of individual(s)

In common law, provocation is when a person is considered to have committed a criminal act partly because of a preceding set of events that might cause a reasonable individual to lose self control. This makes them less morally culpable than if the act was premeditated (pre-planned) and done out of pure malice (malice aforethought). It "affects the quality of the actor's state of mind as an indicator of moral blameworthiness."

It is a possible defense for the person provoked, or a possible criminal act by the one who caused the provocation. It may be a defense by excuse or exculpation alleging a sudden or temporary loss of control (a permanent loss of control is regarded as insanity) as a response to another's provocative conduct sufficient to justify an acquittal, a mitigated sentence or a conviction for a lesser charge. Provocation can be a relevant factor in a court's assessment of a defendant's mens rea, intention, or state of mind, at the time of an act which the defendant is accused of.

In common law, provocation is established by establishing events that would be "adequate" to create a heat of passion in a reasonable person, and by establishing that the heat of passion was created in the accused.

Provocation rarely serves as a complete legal defense, meaning it does not stop the defendant from being guilty of the crime. It may however, lead to a lesser punishment. In some common law legal systems, provocation is a partial defence for murder charges, which can result in the offense being classified as the lesser offense of manslaughter, specifically voluntary manslaughter.

Provocation is distinct from self-defense in that self-defense refers to a justifiable action to exclusively protect oneself from imminent violence.

== Definition ==
Provocation may be defined by statutory law, by common law, or some combination. If a crime is caused by provocation, it is said to be committed in the heat of passion, under an irresistible urge incited by the provoking events, and without being entirely determined by reason. According to the Supreme Court of Virginia in Hannah v. Commonwealth, 1929:

"'Malice aforethought' implies a mind under the sway of reason, whereas 'passion' whilst it does not imply a dethronement of reason, is the furor brevis, which renders a man deaf to the voice of reason so that, although the act was intentional to death, it was not the result of malignity of heart, but imputable to human infirmity."

== History ==
The defense of provocation was first developed in English courts in the 16th and 17th centuries. During that period, a conviction of murder carried a mandatory death sentence. This inspired the need for a lesser offense. At that time, not only was it acceptable, but was socially required that a man respond with controlled violence if his honor or dignity were insulted or threatened. It was therefore considered understandable that sometimes the violence might be excessive and end with a killing.

During the 19th century, as social norms began changing, the idea that it was desirable for dignified men to respond with violence when they were insulted or ridiculed began losing traction and was replaced with the view that while those responses may not be ideal, that they were a normal human reaction resulting from a loss of self-control, and, as such, they deserved to be considered as a mitigating circumstance.

During the end of the 20th century and the beginning of the 21st century, the defense of provocation, and the situations in which it should apply, have led to significant controversies, with many condemning the concept as an anachronism, arguing that it contradicts contemporary social norms where people are expected to control their behavior, even when angry.

Today, the use of provocation as a legal defense is generally controversial, because it appears to enable defendants to receive more lenient treatment because they allowed themselves to be provoked. Judging whether an individual should be held responsible for their actions depends on an assessment of their culpability. This is usually tested by reference to a reasonable person: that is, a universal standard to determine whether an ordinary person would have been provoked and, if so, would have done as the defendant did; if the predominant view of social behavior would be that, when provoked, it would be acceptable to respond verbally and, if the provocation persists, to walk away, that will set the threshold for the defense. Furor brevis or "heat of passion", is the term used in criminal law to describe the emotional state of mind following a provocation, in which acts are considered to be at least partially caused by loss of self-control, so the acts are not entirely governed by reason or expressed "[It's the heat of passion] which renders a man deaf to the voice of reason". In common law, "passion usually means rage, but it also includes fear or any violent and intense emotion sufficient to dethrone reason".

== Controversy ==
=== General concerns ===
The concept of provocation is controversial, and there are many debates related to it. Critics bring several arguments against it, such as:

- people in contemporary society are expected to control their behavior, even when angry, and to not act on any impulse they may have
- provocation creates a culture of blaming the victim
- what is considered provocation is subjective
- provocation laws are very difficult to enforce since, in cases involving murder, the victim is dead and cannot present their version of facts

=== Selective use of the laws ===
Some people accept provocation as a valid legal concept, but express serious concerns about the context in which it is used. Data from Australia shows that the partial defense of provocation that converts murder into manslaughter has been used successfully primarily in two circumstances: sexual infidelity where a male kills his female partner or her lover; and non-violent homosexual advances.

Feminist groups and LGBT groups have been highly critical of this situation. They argue that this legitimizes or trivializes male violence against women; undermines campaigns that seek to stop violence against women; reinforces the view of women as men's property; and maintains and justifies homophobia and discrimination against gay people.

=== Objective vs subjective test ===
There has been controversy on whether the objective or the subjective standard should be used when deciding on whether the behavior of the victim has constituted sufficient provocation. The objective 'ordinary person' test has been criticised for ignoring characteristics such as ethnicity and culture which affect a person's capacity to lose self-control, whereas the subjective standard that focuses on ones' personal and cultural background has been criticized for opening the door for mitigation in cases of honor killings, homophobic or racist violence and bringing in justifications for crimes that may be acceptable in the family and subculture of the accused but are rejected by wider society. A compromise can be a combination of objective and subjective analysis, as was ruled in 2020 by the Supreme Court of Ireland (replacing what was considered to be a purely subjective test that was in existence since the 1970s).

== In the United States ==
In the United States, the Model Penal Code substitutes the broader standard of extreme emotional or mental distress for the comparatively narrower standard of provocation. Criminal law in the United States, however, falls mostly within the jurisdiction of the individual states, and not all states have adopted the Model Penal Code. Under the United States Sentencing Guidelines for federal courts, "If the victim's wrongful conduct contributed significantly to provoking the offense behavior, the court may reduce the sentence below the guideline range to reflect the nature and circumstances of the offense."

=== In cases of assault and battery ===
In the United States, provocation is rarely accepted as a complete defense, but state courts have ruled that it is still a mitigating factor in matters of assault and/or battery where the sentence can be reduced or the crime lowered to a lesser charge. In extremely rare cases, adequate provocation has resulted in the defendant never being charged with a crime. In one famous example, prosecutors in California refused to charge astronaut Buzz Aldrin with assault after he punched conspiracy theorist Bart Sibrel in the face for aggressively confronting him and calling him "a coward, and a liar, and a thief".

== In the United Kingdom ==
In English law, provocation was a mitigatory defence which applied only to murder. In closing decades, it amounted to proving a reasonable total loss of control as a response to another's objectively provocative conduct sufficient to convert what would otherwise have been murder into manslaughter. It was abolished on 4 October 2010 by section 56(1) of the Coroners and Justice Act 2009, replaced by the superseding—and more precisely worded—loss of control defence. Ironically, English law considers the act of intentionally provoking another person to criminal action to be a crime in and of itself under the charge of Fear or provocation of violence.

Until 1957, the common law which governed this offense had established some non-exhaustive categories or examples which constituted provocation, including:

- a gross insult followed by assault
- witnessing an attack on a relative or friend
- witnessing an Englishman being unlawfully deprived of his liberty
- a husband discovering his wife in the act of adultery; and
- possibly a father discovering someone committing sodomy on his son (R v Fisher (1837))

Under section 3 of the Homicide Act 1957, provocation was defined more narrowly as two questions to be decided by the jury: whether "the person charged was provoked (whether by things done or by things said or by both together) to lose his self-control," and whether "the provocation was enough to make a reasonable man do as he did".

The Act provided that provocation could be by anything done or said without it having to be an illegal act and the provoker and the deceased could be third parties. If the accused was provoked, who provoked him was irrelevant.

This section of the Act was superseded by sections 54 and 55 of the Coroners and Justice Act 2009 when they came into force on 4 October 2010.

=== The factual test ===
The first question before the jury was a subjective test and a pure question of fact, i.e. the evidence had to show that the defendant actually lost his self-control. In R v Duffy, Devlin J. said that

Provocation is some act, or series of acts, done by the dead man to the accused, which would cause in any reasonable person, and actually causes in the accused, a sudden and temporary loss of self-control, rendering the accused so subject to passion as to make him or her for the moment not master of his mind.

Under normal circumstances, the response to the provocation had to be almost immediate retaliation. If there was a "cooling-off" period, the court would find that the accused should have regained control, making all subsequent actions intentional and therefore murder. In R v Ibrams & Gregory the defendants had been terrorised and bullied by the deceased over a period of time so devised a plan to attack him. There was no evidence of a sudden and temporary loss of self-control as required by Duffy. Even the period of time to fetch a weapon could be sufficient to cool off. In R v Thornton, a woman suffering from "battered woman syndrome" went to the kitchen, took and sharpened a carving knife, and returned to stab her husband. The appeal referred to s3 which required the jury to have regard to "everything both said and done according to the effect which in their opinion it would have on a reasonable man". The appellant argued that instead of considering the final provocation, the jury should have considered the events over the years leading up to the killing. Beldam LJ rejected this, saying:

In every such case the question for the jury is whether at the moment the fatal blow was struck the accused had been deprived for that moment of the self-control which previously he or she had been able to exercise.

But in R v Thornton (No 2) after considering new medical evidence, a retrial was ordered and the defendant was convicted of manslaughter on the ground of diminished responsibility. Similarly, in R v Ahluwalia a retrial was ordered. The defendant had poured petrol over her husband and set it alight, causing burns from which he died. When the defence of diminished responsibility on the ground of "battered woman syndrome" was put, she was convicted of manslaughter. In R v Humphreys, the defendant finally lost self-control after years of abuse and stabbed her partner. She pleaded that the final words had been the straw that broke the camel's back. The conviction for murder was held unsafe because the accused's psychiatric condition stemming from the abuse should have been attributed to the reasonable person when the jury considered the application of the objective test.

=== The reasonable person test ===
If the jury was satisfied that the defendant was provoked, the test was whether a reasonable person would have acted as the defendant did – an objective test.

It was held in Camplin that the accused's age and sex could be attributed to the reasonable man when the jury considered the defendant's power of self-control. Further, that any characteristic of the accused could be included which the jury considered may affect the gravity of the provocation.

Therefore, the reasonable person had to be endowed with the particular characteristics of the accused. In a number of leading cases, Morhall and Luc Thiet Thuan v R, it was held that the judge should direct the jury to consider whether an ordinary person with ordinary powers of self-control would have reacted to the provocation as the defendant did and that no allowance should be given for any characteristics that might have made him or her more volatile than the ordinary person. These decisions acknowledged, however, that, in addition to age and sex, characteristics which affected the gravity of the provocation to the defendant should be taken into account. In R v Smith the defendant was charged with murder and relied on the defence of provocation, alleging that he had been suffering from serious clinical depression and had been so provoked by the deceased as to lose his self-control. Lord Hoffman held that the test was whether the jury thought that the circumstances were such as to make the loss of self-control sufficiently excusable to reduce the gravity of the offence from murder to manslaughter.

Furthermore, the House held, by a majority, that no distinction should be drawn, when attributing characteristics for the purposes of the objective part of the test imposed by s3 Homicide Act, between their relevance to the gravity of the provocation to a reasonable man and his reaction to it. Account could be taken of a relevant characteristic in relation to the accused's power of self-control, whether or not the characteristic was the object of the provocation. But in HM's AG for Jersey v Holley the Privy Council regarded Smith as wrongly decided, interpreting the Act as setting a purely objective standard. Thus, although the accused's characteristics were to be taken into account when assessing the gravity of the provocation, the standard of self-control to be expected was invariable except for the accused's age and sex. The defendant and the deceased both suffered from chronic alcoholism and had a violent and abusive relationship. The evidence was that the deceased was drunk and taunted him by telling him that she had had sex with another man. The defendant then struck the deceased with an axe which was an accident of availability. Psychiatric evidence was that his consumption of alcohol was involuntary and that he suffered from a number of other psychiatric conditions which, independently of the effects of the alcohol, might have caused the loss of self-control and induced him to kill. Lord Nicholls said:

Whether the provocative acts or words and the defendant's response met the 'ordinary person' standard prescribed by the statute is the question the jury must consider, not the altogether looser question of whether, having regard to all the circumstances, the jury consider the loss of self control was sufficient excusable. The statute does not leave each jury free to set whatever standard they consider appropriate in the circumstances by which to judge whether the defendant's conduct is 'excusable'.

In R v Faqir Mohammed a cultured Asian man caught a young man leaving his daughter's bedroom window. He immediately killed his daughter by repeatedly stabbing her with a knife. Following the death of his wife five years earlier he suffered from depression, and there was credible evidence that he had a violent temperament and had repeatedly been violent towards his daughters and his wife. Despite the fact that a Privy Council ratio decidendi is only persuasive authority, the Court of Appeal applied it and reinstated the law before Smith. Scott Baker LJ said:

Properly directed, the jury should therefore have applied a narrow and strict test of a man with ordinary powers of self-control rather than the wider test of excusability that was put to them by the judge. The jury having convicted on the basis of the wider test, we cannot see any unsafety in the conviction. The same result would have been inevitable if the provocation direction had been on the basis of Holley.

In R v James the court again considered the relationship between the Privy Council decision in Holley and Smith. In his commentary on Holley, Ashworth (2005) said:

Is Holley binding on English courts? There may be a purist strain of argument to the effect that it is not, since it concerns another legal system (that of Jersey). However, the reality is that nine Lords of Appeal in Ordinary sat in this case, and that for practical purposes it was intended to be equivalent of a sitting of the House of Lords.

Viewing this situation as exceptional, Phillips CJ accepted that the Privy Council decision had indeed overruled the House of Lords, recognising the error that the Lords had made in their earlier interpretation of the law. Rather than follow the strict rules of precedent and send the issue back to the Lords for clarification, the Court of Appeal accepted the de facto situation and recognised Holley as the binding precedent.

=== Self-induced provocation ===
In 1973 the Privy Council held in Edwards v R that a blackmailer could not rely on the predictable results of his demands for money when his victim attacked him (a policy decision to prevent a criminal from relying on his own wrongdoing as the cause of the subsequent death). In R v Johnson, the defendant had become involved in an escalating argument with the deceased and his female companion. When the victim threatened the defendant with a beer glass, the defendant fatally stabbed him with a knife. The judge instructed the jury that they were open to find the threatening situation had been self-induced, in which case provocation would not be open as a defence. The Court of Appeal held that section 3 of the Homicide Act 1957 provided that anything could amount to provocation, including responsive actions provoked by the defendant. It applied the defence (duly substituting the conviction for that of manslaughter).

=== Loss of control defence ===
The loss of control defence was introduced by the Coroners and Justice Act 2009 as a replacement to provocation as a partial defence to murder in the jurisdiction of England and Wales. "Loss of control" in the Act requires multiple aspects to be met, and with a number of listed exceptions that can render the defence inapplicable.

In particular, for a defendant to rely on the defence, there must either be "fear of serious violence", or the combination of "circumstances of an extremely grave character" and a "justifiable sense of being seriously wronged". Revenge for sexual infidelity is specifically ruled out as a qualifying trigger, although R v Clinton has interpreted this exception as applying only to cases where sexual infidelity is the single cause of loss of control. R v Clinton [2012] 1 Cr App R 26 has received heavy criticism from academics.

The loss of control defence does not exonerate the person who loses control; instead it downgrades the charge for that person from murder to manslaughter, and does not change the nature of the offence for other perpetrators who may have been involved. The new defense removed the "sudden" requirement, as it wanted to cover battered women who lose control over a long period. However, it will probably not succeed in achieving that aim.

"Loss of control" specifically excludes self-induced provocation in section 55, subsection 6, a) in terms of "fear of serious violence" and b) in terms of "a sense of being seriously wronged by a thing done or said " when the "qualifying trigger" was incited "for the purpose of providing an excuse to use violence".

==== Sentencing ====
The Sentencing Council set out a guideline for manslaughter (substituted for charge/finding of murder) by reason of an accepted defence of loss of control. It came in to effect on 1 November 2018.

- The recommended "offence range" is 3 – 20 years custody.
- The maximum is life imprisonment.
- This is a serious specified offence for the purposes of sections 224 and 225(2) (life sentences for serious offences) of the Criminal Justice Act 2003.
- This is an offence listed in Part 1 of Schedule 15B for the purposes of section 224A (life sentence for a second listed offence) and section 226A (extended sentence for certain violent, sexual or terrorism offences) of the Criminal Justice Act 2003.
- The type of manslaughter (and thereby the appropriate guideline) should have been identified prior to sentence.

A nine-stage formula is to be used, for ideal legal compliance. Stage 1, culpability, will set the sentencing "starting point".

Notably the fourth stage is reduction for guilty pleas (such as by a plea bargain); the fifth is dangerousness. If the actions and/or psychological reports are adverse they may well meet the criteria in Chapter 5 of Part 12 of the Criminal Justice Act 2003 by which it would be appropriate to impose a life sentence (section 224A or section 225) or an extended sentence (section 226A).

== Other common-law countries ==
=== New Zealand ===
Provocation as a partial defence for murder came into spotlight in New Zealand during 2009 following the trial of 33-year-old university tutor Clayton Weatherston, with calls for its abolition except during sentencing. On 9 January 2008, Weatherston stabbed to death university student and girlfriend Sophie Elliott in her Dunedin home. During his trial, Weatherston used provocation as a defense to murder and claimed it was manslaughter. He was found guilty of murder and sentenced to life imprisonment with a 17 years non-parole period. In response, the New Zealand Parliament introduced the Crimes (Provocation Repeal) Amendment Bill, which repealed Sections 169 and 170 of the Crimes Act 1961 and therefore abolishing the partial defense of provocation. The bill passed its third reading 116–5, with only ACT New Zealand opposing the bill, and became law effective 8 December 2009. Although the defense was removed, it could still be used for cases prior to 2009: In May 2010 Emani Tinoa'i was convicted of murdering his wife at a service station in Wellington after unsuccessfully attempting to use the partial defense of provocation.

=== Canada ===
In 2015, Canada reformed the provocation defense restricting its use. Article 232(2) of the Criminal Code states that provocation is: "Conduct of the victim that would constitute an indictable offense under this Act that is punishable by five or more years of imprisonment and that is of such a nature as to be sufficient to deprive an ordinary person of the power of self-control is provocation for the purposes of this section, if the accused acted on it on the sudden and before there was time for their passion to cool." Prior to the amendment, the law required only that the provoking act be a "wrongful act or insult", not a serious indictable offence.

=== Australia ===
In Australia, Tasmania became the first state to abolish the partial defence of provocation in case of murder which acted by converting what would otherwise have been murder into manslaughter. The next state to abolish it was Victoria, in 2005, however it was replaced by a new defensive homicide law. The 2005 defensive homicide laws were subsequently repealed in 2014. Western Australia abolished the partial defence of provocation in 2008. The ACT and the Northern Territory amended the law in 2004 and 2006 respectively to exclude a non-violent sexual advance as a sufficient basis for a defence of provocation in itself; such conduct must be taken into account with other conduct of the deceased to determine whether the defence has been established. By contrast in New South Wales, the law of provocation was amended in 2014 to assert that a non-violent sexual advance to the accused does not constitute extreme provocation. The new provocation law of New South Wales was amended to the defence of extreme provocation; the provocative conduct of the deceased must also have constituted a serious indictable offence, and the loss of self-control test must be measured by the objective test of the "ordinary person". It was also made clear in the amendments that the conduct of the deceased may constitute extreme provocation, even if the conduct did not occur immediately before the act causing death. This was done in order to provide protection for victims of long-term abuse, or "slow burn" situations. In Queensland the partial defence of provocation in section 304(1) of the Criminal Code was amended in 2011, in order to "reduce the scope of the defence being available to those who kill out of sexual possessiveness or jealousy". South Australia abolished provocation in 2020.

== See also ==
- Crime of passion
- Battered woman syndrome
- R v Clinton

== See also ==
- Fighting words
- Gay panic defense
- Imperfect self-defense
- Self control theory in crime
- Manslaughter in English law
