= Torture murder =

Type of murder

A torture murder is a murder where death was preceded by the torture of the victim. In many legal jurisdictions a murder involving "exceptional brutality or cruelty" will attract a longer sentence than murder alone.

== Frequency ==
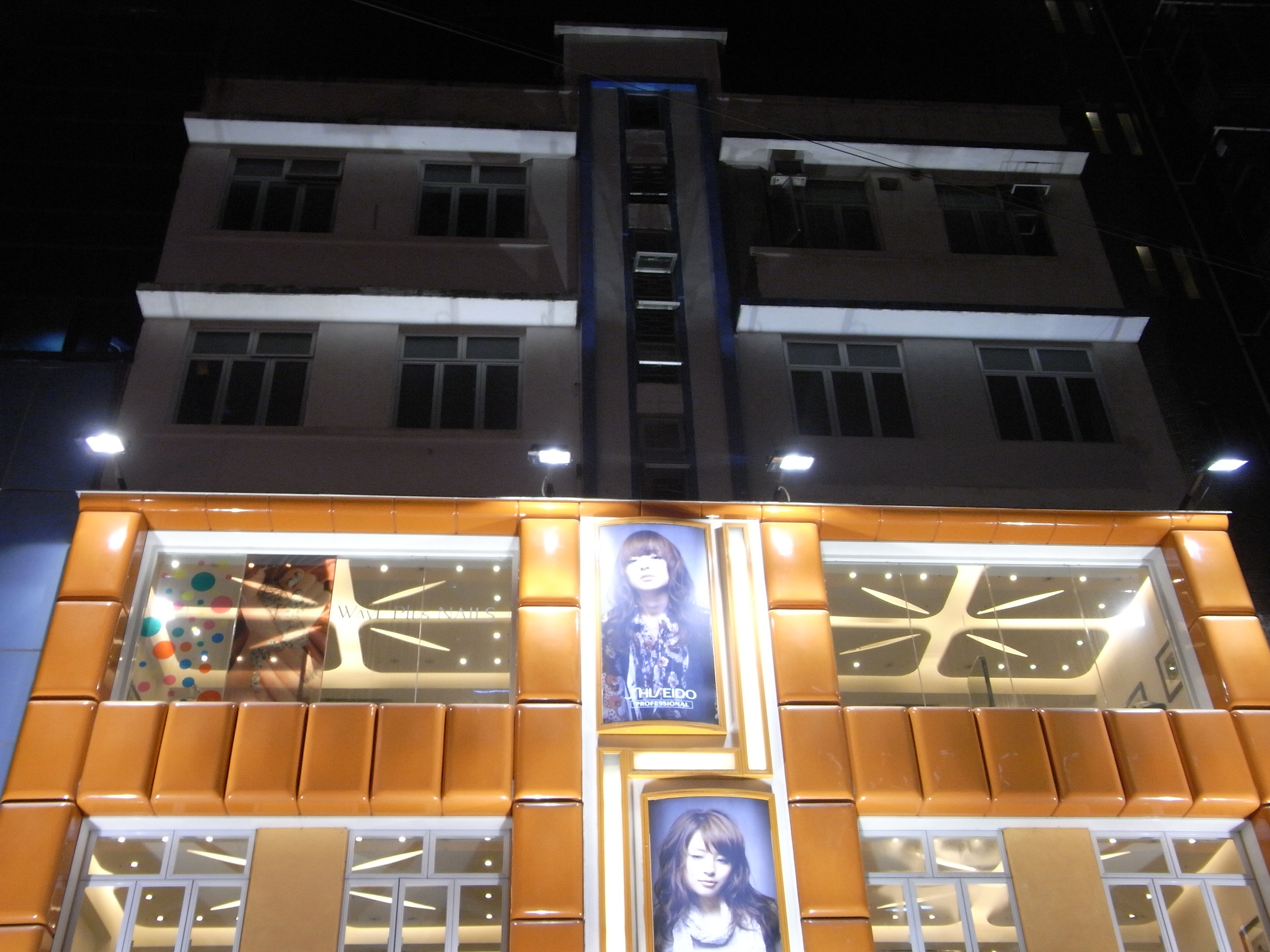
Apartment complex near Granville Road, Hong Kong, which was the location of one of the most infamous torture murders, commonly dubbed the Hello Kitty murder case.

Lynching in the United States—extrajudicial killing by a mob, which often served as a means of racial terrorism—frequently involved public torture of the victim or victims, and was in many instances followed by human trophy collecting.

In the 21st century, many of the murders of foreigners in and citizens of Iraq and Syria committed by members of the terrorist organization Islamic State have been preceded by torture. Film footage of the persecution of Muslims in Myanmar documents the aftermath and testimony of torture murder by government forces, and evidence has linked torture murder with many other massacres, war crimes, and genocides, both contemporary and historical.

== Punishment ==
Murder laws worldwide vary a great deal, but a murder involving torture will generally attract a harsher penalty than a murder alone. Legal mechanisms of penalty enhancement vary between jurisdictions. In the laws of Italy, Germany, Norway, and many parts of the United States, there are two or more "degrees" of murder, with wording such as: "...inflicting torture upon the victim prior to the victim's death" typically used to rule that the highest degree should apply. In other jurisdictions, it may be that even if there was just one crime of murder, the sentencing practices and guidelines are such that the aggravating circumstance of any torture will nevertheless allow for a longer than normal penalty, up to and including life imprisonment.

== See also ==
- Antisocial personality disorder
- Sadistic personality disorder
- Psychopathy
- Robert Berdella
- Gabriel Fernandez
