= Mord =

Mord means "murder" in German, Polish and the Scandinavian languages, and can refer to:

- Murder (German law)
- Murder (Norwegian law)
- Murder (Swedish law)
- Murder (Swiss law)
- Mord (cards) - a contract to win every trick in certain card games
