= List of murder laws by country =

This is a list of the laws of murder by country. The legal definition of murder varies by country: the laws of different countries deal differently with matters such as mens rea (how the intention on the part of the alleged murderer must be proved for the offence to amount to murder) and sentencing.

- Australia
- Brazil
- Canada
- China
- Croatia
- Cuba
- Denmark
- England and Wales
- Finland
- France
- Germany
- Georgia
- Hong Kong
- India
- Israel
- Italy
- Japan
- Netherlands
- Northern Ireland
- Norway
- Peru
- Portugal
- Romania
- Russia
- Scotland
- Sweden
- Switzerland
- United States
