= Prohibition of Unlawful Assembly (Interference with the Freedom of Matrimonial Alliances) Bill, 2011 =

Prohibition of Unlawful Assembly (Interference with the Freedom of Matrimonial Alliances) Bill, 2011 is a proposed legislation in India which intends to check honor killings. It aims to criminalise the intimidation of consenting adults by kangaroo courts for same-gotra marriages, inter-caste, inter-community and inter-religious marriages.

== Overview ==
The first draft was presented by the Law Commission of India on 20 January 2012. The commission had also released a consultation paper on khap panchayats and honour killings, and sought public opinion on it. The commission’s consultation paper had rejected the government’s proposal that Indian Penal Code should be amended to bring honour killing under Section 300. The commission said that although the offences were already covered by the Indian Penal Code, there was nothing to prevent such assemblies from happening.

The proposed bill seeks to prohibit any person or group of persons to gather and adjudicate or condemn any marriage, which is not prohibited by law, on the claims that it brings dishonour of a caste, locality or community.

Marriage, as defined by the draft, also includes proposed and intended marriages. The district collector and magistrate will be given the responsibility to protect the targeted persons and prevents such illegal gatherings. Criminal intimidation will have the same definition as under the Section 503 of the Indian Penal Code.

The offences under it will be cognisable, non-bailable and non-compoundable. The trials will be decided by a sessions judge or an additional session judge. Special courts which would be set by states in consultation with the High Courts will have the power of a session court. The courts will also be able to take sou motu cognisance of the case. The offences will carry a maximum of three years imprisonment and a fine of ₹30,000.

== See also ==
- Honor killing in India
