= Murder in Georgia law =

Murder in Georgia law may refer to:

- Murder in Georgia (country) law
- Murder in Georgia (U.S. state) law
