= Kongsberg attack =

2021 mass stabbing in Norway

- Kongsberg (Buskerud) Kongsberg (Norway) Kongsberg (Europe)
- Location: Kongsberg, Buskerud, Norway
- Date: 13 October 2021 c. 18:12 – 18:47 (CEST UTC+02:00)
- Attack type: Mass stabbing, spree killing, mass murder
- Weapons: Bow and arrow; Two bladed weapons
- Deaths: 5
- Injuries: 3
- Perpetrator: Espen Andersen Bråthen (Note: In some non-Norwegian sources, Bråthen is spelled as "Brathen" or "Braathen".)
- Motive: Likely mental illness caused by psychotic delusions
- Convictions: Murder

On 13 October 2021, five people were killed and three others were injured in a mass stabbing in Kongsberg, Buskerud, Norway. The perpetrator, Espen Andersen Bråthen, attacked several locations, during which he also used a bow and arrow to injure at least one of the victims, before he was arrested by responding police.

Bråthen, who had a history of mental illness, was charged with murder. Although he pleaded guilty, in June 2022, a court determined his mental illness meant he could not be held criminally responsible for his actions, and he was sentenced to psychiatric confinement.

== Attack ==
Police were first notified of a person walking around Kongsberg with a bow and arrows in a quiver on his shoulder at 18:12 CEST. Upon receiving the first calls, a patrol was quickly sent to the location of the attack, followed by three others. Armed officers first confronted the perpetrator six minutes after the first calls, but he shot several arrows at them and escaped. Afterwards, he committed the attack and killed his victims, according to the police chief.

The perpetrator is said to have first started attacking people inside a Coop Extra supermarket and then moved over a large area. Police said that he first started firing arrows at people but constantly missed, that he used two other weapons in addition to the bow and arrow, and that all of the fatalities were a result of stabbings rather than arrow shots, as he discarded or lost his bow at some point during the attack. At least one non-fatal injury was attributed to an arrow shot into a man's back. Pictures have been published of arrows lodged in walls at the scene. The perpetrator left the store and continued his attacks in the street and at a residential area.

As the attack continued, police cordoned off several parts of Kongsberg. An arrest was eventually made at 18:47, 35 minutes after the attack began; explaining the delay of the arrest, a police official described the situation as "confusing". A warning shot was fired at the time of the arrest, according to the police chief. By the time of the arrest, the attack had spurred a large emergency response including 22 heavily armed police patrols, more than ten ambulances, and two helicopters. The attack was the deadliest in Norway since the 22 July attacks a decade earlier.

== Victims ==
Five people were killed in the attack, and three others were injured. The five killed were four women and one man; two of them were 75 years old, another two were aged 78 and 56, and the fifth was 52-year-old German musician and writer Andrea Haugen. They were killed in either their own homes or in public spaces. The three survivors did not sustain life-threatening injuries; one of them was an off-duty police officer. The investigation indicated that the victims were all attacked in different locations.

== Investigation ==
The suspect was taken to a police station in Drammen, where his defence lawyer said he was questioned for more than three hours, was co-operating with authorities, and has confessed to the attack. Police then moved the suspect to the custody of health services on 14 October pending a psychiatric evaluation. He was charged for the murders of five people and for injuring several others. The Norwegian Police Security Service launched a terrorism investigation, but officers were focusing on a broad range of motives. In light of the suspect's Danish citizenship, Danish Prime Minister Mette Frederiksen said Danish authorities would work with Norway on the investigation. In a press conference on 16 October, police said they were also investigating the mental state of the suspect. A total of 140 witnesses were questioned in relation to the attack.

== Perpetrator ==
The perpetrator is Danish citizen Espen Andersen Bråthen (born 1983). He was born in Norway to a Norwegian father and a Danish mother and has lived his entire life in Norway. Bråthen was living in Kongsberg at the time of the attack. He had several prior criminal convictions for break-ins, cannabis possession, and death threats against family members. Bråthen was known to the police, who said he had converted to Islam around 2016. The imam of Kongsberg's mosque reported that Bråthen told him he had a "revelation" without adding anything more. The imam said he did not appear dangerous.

Police were first made aware of him in 2015 and had last been in contact with Bråthen in 2020; they had been concerned about his possible extremist views. In 2017, a childhood friend reported Bråthen to police after he posted two videos online, in which he said he was a Muslim and came with a warning. The friend believed that he was posing a threat. After investigating the videos and interrogating Bråthen about them, police determined the statements made in them did not involve any criminal threats. In 2018, police notified health services about him, but they determined that he was unlikely to commit a terrorist attack. Bråthen did not appear on their radar in 2021. The police stated that Bråthen's conversion was an unlikely motive for the attack, and instead indicated mental illness as possible motivator.

== Aftermath ==
Norwegian police officers, who are usually unarmed, were ordered to temporarily carry firearms nationwide after the attack. However, there was no change to the national threat level in the country. Questions were raised by residents and Norwegian media about the inability of police to stop the attack during their first confrontation with the perpetrator; officers in Norway are trained to immediately respond to an ongoing incident without waiting for other units.

== Trial ==
The trial started on 18 May 2022 in Hokksund district court. Bråthen was charged with the murder of five people and attempted murder of 11 more.

The forensic psychiatrists Harald Brauer, Helge Haugerud, and Knut-Petter Langlo had examined Espen Andersen Bråthen. Their report diagnosed Bråthen with a mental illness, and claims he was psychotic at the time of the attack and during observation, rendering Bråthen not criminally responsible.

On 24 June 2022, Bråthen was convicted in the attack but the court found that he was unfit for punishment under Norwegian law due to chronic paranoid schizophrenia and was therefore ordered to compulsory mental health care. This was the result that both the prosecution and the defense had requested.
