= Law of Croatia =

The law of Croatia is part of the legal system of Croatia. It belongs to the civil law legal system. It is grounded on the principles laid out in the Constitution of Croatia and safeguarded by the Constitutional Court of the Republic of Croatia.

Croatian Law system is largely influenced by German and Austrian law systems. It is significantly influenced by the Civil Code of the Austrian Empire (1811), known in Croatia as Opći građanski zakon (OGZ) (General Civil Law). It was in force from 1853 to 1946, with some provisions still applying in the modern day. The Independent State of Croatia, a Nazi-controlled puppet state was established in 1941 during World War II, used the OGZ as a basis for the 1943 Base of the Civil Code for the Independent State of Croatia (Osnova građanskoga zakona za Nezavisnu Državu Hrvatsku). After the War, Croatia become a member of the Yugoslav Federation which enacted in 1946 the Law on immediate voiding of regulations passed before April 6, 1941 and during the enemy occupation (Zakon o nevaženju pravnih propisa donesenih prije 6. travnja 1941. i za vrijeme neprijateljske okupacije). By this law OGZ was declared invalid as a whole, but implementation of some of its legal rules was approved.

During the post-war era, the Croatian legal system become influenced by elements of the socialist law. Croatian civil law was pushed aside, and it took norms of public law and legal regulation of the social ownership. After Croatia declared independence from Yugoslavia on June 25, 1991, the previous legal system was used as a base for writing new laws. The Civil Obligations Act (Zakon o obveznim odnosima) was enacted in 2005. Today, Croatia as a European Union member state implements elements of the EU acquis into its legal system.

== See also ==
- Capital punishment in Croatia
- Croatian nationality law
- Croatian Parliament
- Croatian state right
- Law enforcement in Croatia
- Life imprisonment in Croatia
- Ministry of Justice (Croatia)
- Murder (Croatian law)
- Narodne novine
