= Murder in Cuban law =

Murder in Cuba is classified into three major categories: murder with special circumstances, murder, and manslaughter.

== Categories ==
=== Murder with special circumstances ===
Murder with special circumstances includes:

- murder of the president, vice president, a politician, police officer, any member of the military, or for children under the age of 14;
- murder committed in the commission of any violent felony, such as kidnapping, robbery, arson, or burglary; or
- murder of multiple persons.

Murder with special circumstances is punishable by a maximum term of life imprisonment, or by the death penalty.

=== Murder ===
Murder without aggravating circumstances is punishable by a maximum term of 30 years.

=== Manslaughter ===
Manslaughter is non-intentional homicide. It is punishable by between 7 and 25 years in prison.

== See also ==
- List of murder laws by country
