= Murder in Brazilian law =

In Brazil, homicide is punished under article 121 of the Penal Code. It is split into two different categories: homicídio doloso (where the agent acts with the intent to kill, or taking the risk of killing as being a predictable consequence of his or her acts), and homicídio culposo (where the agent has no intention to kill, nor takes the risk of killing as a predictable consequence of his or her acts). The penalty for intentional homicide varies from six to twenty years; the penalty for unintentional homicide varies from one to three years.

Intentional homicide may be further qualified (qualificado) by any of the following circumstances:

- if it is committed for pay or other reward, or other vile motive;
- if its motivation is futile;
- if committed with the use of poison, fire, explosive, asphyxia, torture, or other cruel or insidious mean, or of any mean that may result in danger to other;
- if committed by treachery, ambush, dissimulation, or other means that turn defense difficult or impossible;
- if committed to ensure the execution, occultation, impunity, or profit of other crime.

In these cases, penalty varies from twelve to thirty years.

Penalties for intentional murder are increased by one third if the victim is under fourteen or over sixty years old.

Penalties for intentional murder may be reduced by the judge by one sixth to one third, if it was committed for reason of relevant social or moral motivation, or under violent emotion, caused by unjust provocation of the victim.

Penalties for unintentional murder are increased by one third, if it results of inobservation of technical rule of professional activity, or if the agent fails to render aid to the victim, does not act to lessen the consequences of the act, or flees to avoid detention.

Penalties for unintentional homicide can be not applied, at the judge's criterion, if the consequences of the crime affect the agent so strongly that the penal sanction reveals unnecessary.

Infanticide, defined as the killing of a newborn, during birth or immediately after by its own mother, under the influence of puerperal state, constitutes a different crime, punished under article 123.

The Brazilian Penal code also has provisions that apply to any crime, including homicide:

The penalty for attempted crimes varies between one and two thirds of the penalty prescribed for the crime (article 14, II).

Impossible crimes are not punished (article 17).

Killing in legitimate defence is not punishable (article 23, II).

There is no penalty if the agent is unable, due to mental disease or incomplete development, to understand the nature of the act or to behave in accordance to such understandment (article 26). Instead, the agent should be interned in a psychiatric institution (article 96).

Minors of 18 are criminally inimputable (and are dealt with according to the Estatuto da Criança e do Adolescente, instead of the Penal Code) (article 27).

The penalty should be aggravated if the agent is reincident, or if the victim is a relative, a pregnant woman, an ill person, or is under protection of authorities, or if the act is committed during public calamity or personal disgrace of the victim, or with abuse of power or violation of professional duty (article 61).

The penalty should be attenuated if the agent is under 21 years old, or has spontaneously confessed to the crime (article 65).

== See also ==
- List of murder laws by country
- Brazilian criminal justice
