= Homicide (Canadian law) =

Aspect of Canadian law

In Canada, homicide is the act of causing death to another person through any means, directly or indirectly. Homicide can either be culpable or non-culpable, with the former being unlawful under a category of offences defined in the Criminal Code, a statute passed by the Parliament of Canada that applies uniformly across the country. Murder is the most serious category of culpable homicide, the others being manslaughter and infanticide.

== Culpability ==
To commit homicide is to cause by any means, directly or indirectly, the death of a human being. All forms of culpable homicide require some form of intent (although not necessarily the intent to cause death, or the death of the victim) or criminal negligence. In particular, a homicide is culpable if it occurs:

- by means of an unlawful act;
- by criminal negligence;
- by causing the victim, by threats or fear of violence or by deception, to do anything that causes their death; or
- by wilfully frightening the victim, in the case of a child or sick person.

The general test for causation for culpable homicide is that the accused was a significant contributing cause of the victim's death. However, for a culpable homicide to be murder in the first degree for one of the reasons listed under s. 231(5) of the Criminal Code, viz. hijacking, sexual assault, kidnapping or hostage taking, the judge or jury must also be satisfied that the accused's actions were "an essential, substantial and integral part of the killing of the victim".

A homicide that is not culpable is not illegal under criminal law.

== Offences ==
=== Murder ===
Murder occurs where a person who commits culpable homicide:

- means to cause the death of the victim or another person,
- means to cause bodily harm to the victim or another person, if they know the bodily harm is likely to cause death, or
- caused the death while committing a "dangerous act" that the accused knew death was a likely result of, in the course of committing (or attempting to commit) an indictable offence.

==== First degree murder ====
A person who commits murder commits first degree murder if

- They planned and deliberated the murder;
  - "Planned" means "carefully thought out before it was carried out";
  - "Deliberated" means "considered, not impulsive";
- The victim is a police officer or prison employee;
- They committed the murder while committing or attempting to commit the hijacking of an aircraft, sexual assault, (Note: Including offences listed in sections 272 and 273 of the criminal code) kidnapping, forcible confinement, hostage taking, criminal harassment, intimidation, an offence in relation to a criminal organization, or an offence that constitutes terrorist activity;

or

- They committed the murder "for the benefit of, at the direction of or in association with a criminal organization";

It must also be the case that their actions be a "substantial" — rather than a merely "significant" —contributing cause to the death.

==== Second degree murder ====
Second degree murder includes any murder, as defined in the section above, that does not meet the definition of first degree murder.

=== Infanticide ===
Infanticide is the killing of a newly-born child by its mother where the mother's mind was disturbed as a result of giving birth or of consequent lactation.

=== Manslaughter ===
A culpable homicide which is not murder or infanticide is manslaughter.

== Penalties ==
The mandatory sentence for any adult convicted of murder in Canada is a life sentence, with various time periods before a person may apply for parole. However the ability to apply for parole does not mean parole is guaranteed. This sentencing regime does not apply to youths unless they are sentenced as adults. A youth can, but is not required to, receive an adult sentence if they were at least 14 years of age at the time of the offence.

Parole ineligibility periods for murder
| Offence | Circumstances | Parole ineligibility period |
|---|---|---|
| First degree murder | In general | 25 years |
| First degree murder | Where the offender was 16 or 17 years old at the time of the offence and sentenced as an adult | 10 years |
| First degree murder | Where the offender was 14 or 15 years old at the time of the offence and sentenced as an adult | 5–7 years |
| Second degree murder | Committed by an offender previously convicted of murder | 25 years |
| Second degree murder | In general | 10–25 years |
| Second degree murder | Where the offender was 16 or 17 years old at the time of the offence and sentenced as an adult | 7 years |
| Second degree murder | Where the offender was 14 or 15 years old at the time of the offence and sentenced as an adult | 5–7 years |

In 2011, an amendment to the Criminal Code was passed to allow for consecutive periods of parole ineligibility for multiple murder offences. It gave courts the authority, but not the obligation, to order life sentences be served consecutively instead of concurrently, in effect allowing for the parole ineligibility periods of multiple murders to be stacked together. The provision was however struck down by the Supreme Court in R v Bissonnette.

For offences committed prior to December 2, 2011, someone guilty of a single murder could have their non-parole period reduced to no less than 15 years under the Faint hope clause. However, this provision is not available for offences committed after that date.

In cases of second-degree murder and within the parameters set under the law, the sentencing judge has the discretion to set the date for parole eligibility after considering recommendations from both the Crown and the defence, as well as any recommendation that a jury in the case may choose to make.

The maximum penalty for manslaughter is imprisonment for life. A mandatory minimum penalty (ranging from 4 to 7 years depending on the circumstances) applies only when the offence is committed with a firearm. Nevertheless, there is also a provision under which a person convicted of a "serious personal injury offence" meeting the statutory criteria may be declared a dangerous offender. A dangerous offender may be sentenced to an indeterminate period of imprisonment and is eligible for parole after serving a minimum of 7 years. An offender convicted of murder is ineligible to be declared a dangerous offender for that same homicide (since a mandatory life sentence already applies).

Under the Youth Criminal Justice Act, youths (12 to 17 years) convicted of murder who are not sentenced as an adult do not face a life sentence. Instead, if convicted of first-degree murder, they must serve a maximum sentence of ten years, with a maximum of six of those years spent in custody. If convicted of second-degree murder, they must serve a maximum of seven years, with a maximum of four of those years spent in custody. A youth convicted of manslaughter or infanticide faces a maximum sentence of three and two years respectively, with two-thirds served in custody (except under exceptional circumstances), and the remainder under community supervision. There are two levels of custody for youth, open and closed, with the former being less restrictive than the latter. There is no parole available for offenders in youth facilities, however, there are mandatory annual reviews in which a youth can ask for their level of custody to be lowered, or that the remainder of their sentence be served in the community with conditions similar to parole.

The maximum prison sentence for infanticide is 5 years.

== See also ==
- List of murder laws by country
