= Misdemeanor =

"Lesser" criminal act in some common law legal systems

A misdemeanor (American English, spelled misdemeanour elsewhere) is any "lesser" criminal act in some common law legal systems. Misdemeanors are generally punished less severely than more serious felonies, but theoretically more so than administrative infractions (also known as minor, petty, summary offenses, or civil infractions) and regulatory offenses. Typically, misdemeanors are punished with prison time of no longer than one year, monetary fines, or community service.

== Distinction between felonies and misdemeanors ==
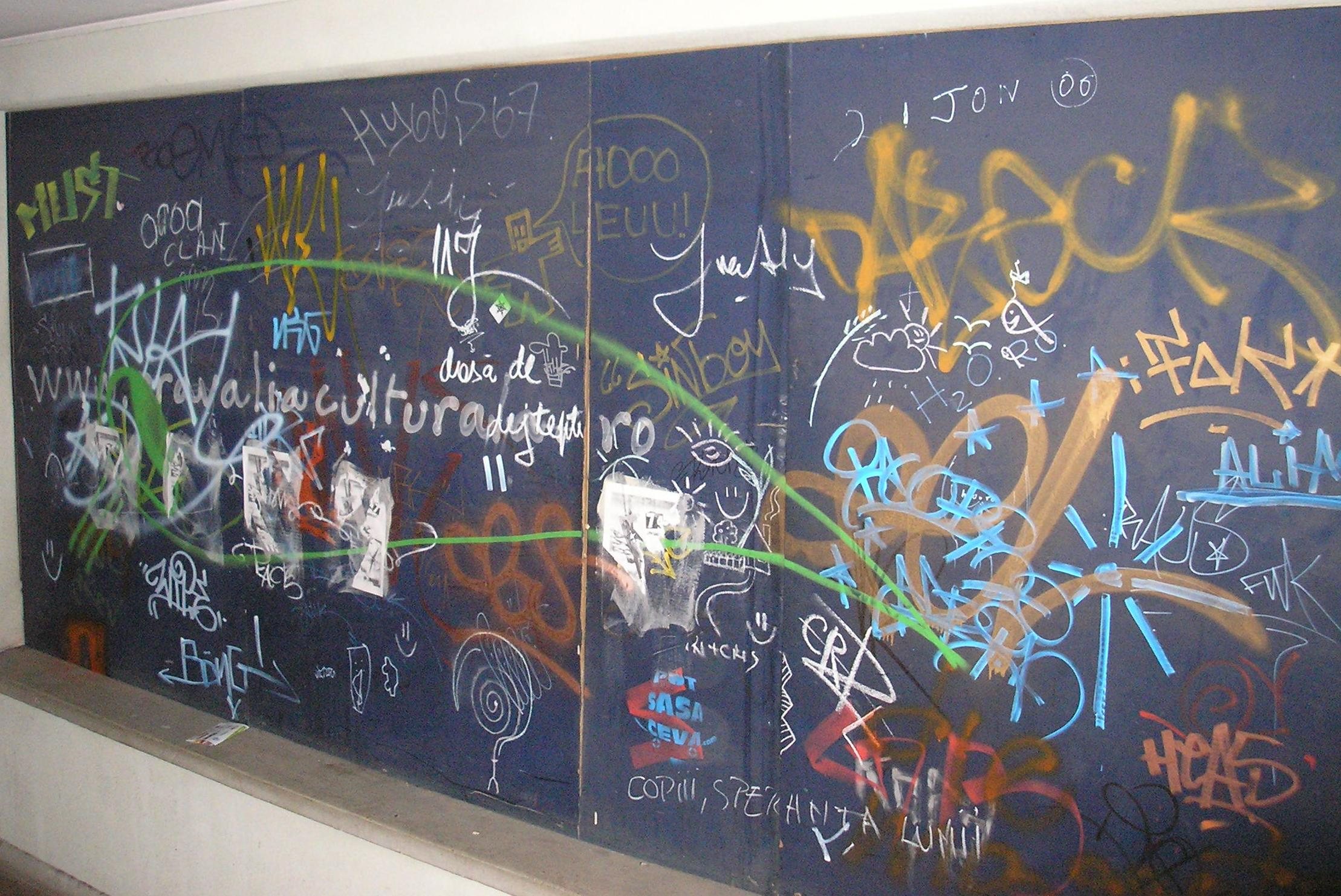
In the US, graffiti is a common form of misdemeanor vandalism, although in many states it is now a felony.

A misdemeanor is considered a crime of lesser seriousness, and a felony one of greater seriousness. The maximum punishment for a misdemeanor is less than that for a felony under the principle that the punishment should fit the crime. One standard for measurement is the degree to which a crime affects others or society. Measurements of the degree of seriousness of a crime have been developed.

In the United States, the federal government generally considers a crime punishable with incarceration for not more than one year, or lesser penalty, to be a misdemeanor. All other crimes are considered felonies. Many US states also employ the same or a similar distinction.

The distinction between felonies and misdemeanors has been abolished by several common law jurisdictions, notably the UK and Australia. These jurisdictions have generally adopted some other classification (in the UK the substance of the original distinction remains, only slightly altered): in the Commonwealth nations of Australia, Canada, New Zealand, and the United Kingdom, the crimes are divided into summary offences and indictable offences. The Republic of Ireland, a former member of the Commonwealth, also uses these divisions.

In some jurisdictions, those who are convicted of a misdemeanor are known as misdemeanants (as contrasted with those convicted of a felony who are known as felons). Depending on the jurisdiction, examples of misdemeanors may include: petty theft, prostitution, public intoxication, simple assault, disorderly conduct, trespass, shoplifting, vandalism, reckless driving, indecent exposure, forcible touching, and possession of cannabis for personal use.

== When a misdemeanor becomes a felony ==
In the United States, even if a criminal charge for the defendant's conduct is normally a misdemeanor, sometimes a repeat offender will be charged with a felony offense. For example, the first time a person commits certain crimes, such as spousal assault, it is normally a misdemeanor, but the second time it may become a felony. Other misdemeanors may be upgraded to felonies based on context. For example, in some jurisdictions the crime of indecent exposure might normally be classified as a misdemeanor, but be charged as a felony when committed in front of a minor.

== Penalties ==
Misdemeanors usually do not result in the restriction of civil rights, but may result in loss of privileges, such as professional licenses, public offices, or public employment. Such effects are known as the collateral consequences of criminal charges. This is more common when the misdemeanor is related to the privilege in question (such as the loss of a taxi driver's license after a conviction for reckless driving), or when the misdemeanor is deemed to involve moral turpitude—and in general is evaluated on a case-by-case basis.

=== United States ===
In the United States, misdemeanors are typically crimes with a maximum punishment of 12 months of incarceration, typically in a local jail. This contrasts with felons, who are typically incarcerated in a prison. Jurisdictions such as Massachusetts and Pennsylvania are notable exceptions: the maximum punishment of some misdemeanors in Massachusetts is up to 2.5 years' imprisonment and up to five years' imprisonment in Pennsylvania for first-degree misdemeanors. People who are convicted of misdemeanors are often punished with probation, community service, short jail term, or part-time incarceration such as a sentence that may be served on the weekends.

The United States Constitution provides that the President may be impeached and subsequently removed from office if found guilty by Congress for "high crimes and misdemeanors". As used in the Constitution, the terms crime and misdemeanor were identified to be included in "language [that ...] could not be understood without reference to the common law" through citation of Blackstone's Commentaries, whereby they denoted "serious" and "petty" "criminal offenses" respectively. This is substantially similar to employing the felony–misdemeanor distinction used in modern criminal codes. The definition of what constitutes "high crimes and misdemeanors" for purposes of impeachment is left to the judgment of Congress.

=== Singapore ===
In Singapore, defendants found guilty of misdemeanors are generally given a jail sentence for a number of months, but with certain specific crimes, suspects are sentenced to a harsher sentence. An example is the penalty imposed for vandalism, which is a fine not exceeding S$2,000 or imprisonment not exceeding three years, and also corporal punishment of not less than three strokes and not more than eight strokes with the use of a cane; an example was the Caning of Michael Fay.

== Misdemeanor classes ==
Depending on the jurisdiction, several classes of misdemeanors may exist. The forms of punishment can vary widely between those classes. For example, the federal and some state governments in the United States divide misdemeanors into several classes, with certain classes punishable by jail time and others carrying only a fine. In New York law, a Class A Misdemeanor, which among other things includes the sex crime of forcible touching, carries a maximum sentence of one year of imprisonment, while a Class B Misdemeanor "shall not exceed three months".

For example, Virginia has four classes of misdemeanors, with Class 1 and Class 2 misdemeanors being punishable by twelve-month and six-month jail sentences, respectively, and Class 3 and Class 4 misdemeanors being non-jail offenses payable by fines. New York has three classes of misdemeanors: A, B, and Unclassified.

=== Unclassified misdemeanors ===
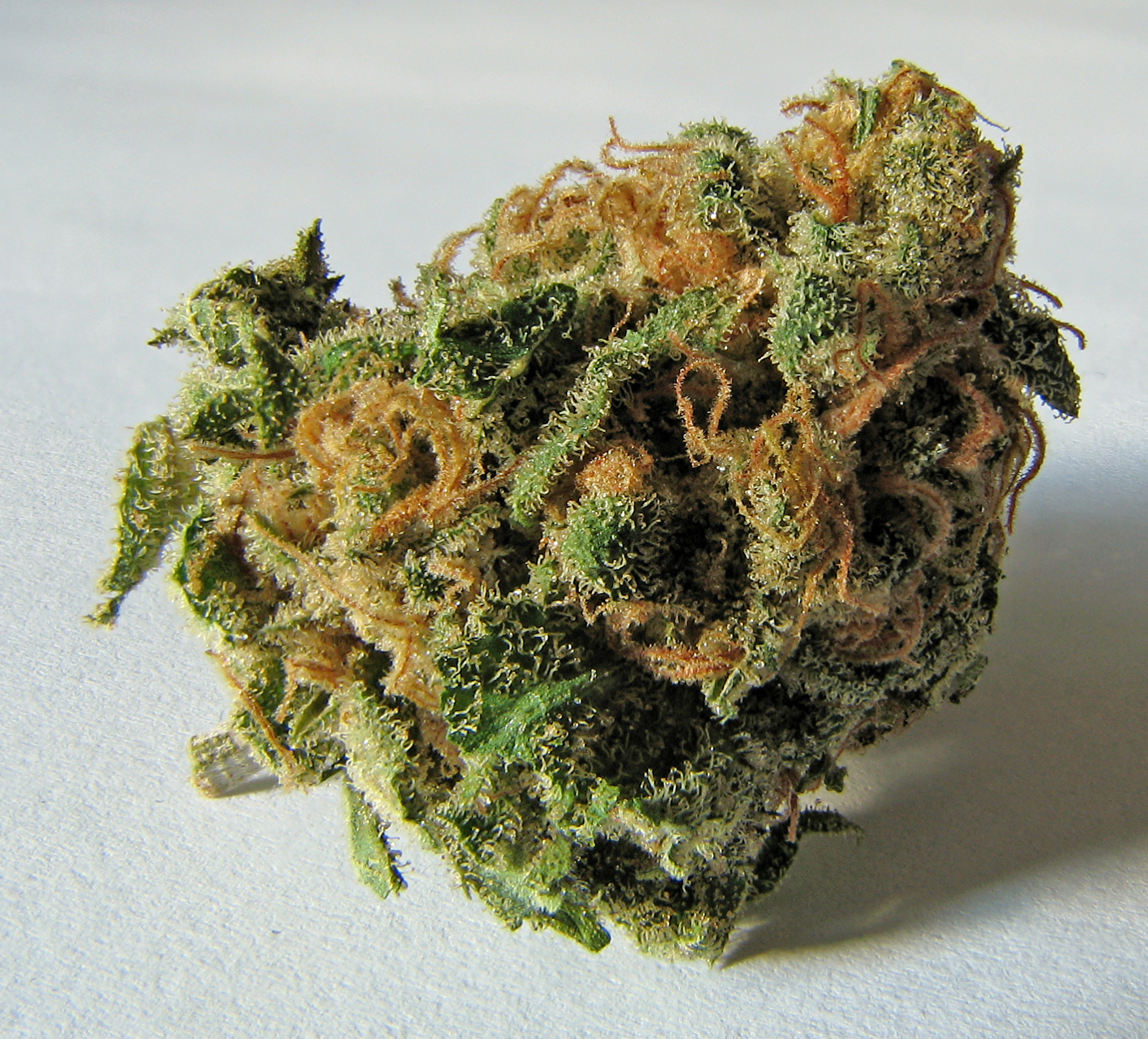
Possession of cannabis may be an unclassified misdemeanor in parts of the US.

In the United States, when a statute does not specify the class of a misdemeanor, it may be referred to as an unclassified misdemeanor.

== England and Wales ==
All distinctions between felony and misdemeanour were abolished by section 1(1) of the Criminal Law Act 1967.

== See also ==
- Convicted felon
- Federal crime
- Misdemeanor murder
