= Murder in Finnish law =

Finnish legal policy

In Finland, murder is defined as homicide with at least one of four aggravating factors:

1. Intent
2. Brutality or cruelty
3. Endangering public safety
4. Killing a public servant upholding public safety or because of his lawful duty.

The offense as a whole must be aggravated.

For an adult of sound mind, the only possible punishment for murder is life imprisonment. A conditional release may be granted after 12 years of imprisonment, subject to approval in the Helsinki Court of Appeals. The President of Finland also has the authority to grant a pardon. Juveniles aged 15-17 and adult convicts in non compos mentis can receive sentences ranging from 2 to 12 years of imprisonment. Typically, the punishment for this special group is 10 to 12 years. In cases involving multiple victims or exceptionally severe crimes, adult convicts in non compos mentis can also be sentenced to life imprisonment. Multiple murderers aged 15-17 can be sentenced to a maximum of 15 years of imprisonment.

Prior to 2006, only the president had the authority to pardon a life sentence. However, since the 1960s, presidents have regularly granted pardons to nearly all offenders after a period of 12 to 15 years. In 2006, the legislation was changed, and all life sentences are now reviewed by an appellate court after 12 years of execution. If the convict is still considered a danger to society, their case will be reviewed every two years thereafter. Involuntary confinement to a psychiatric institution may also be imposed, sometimes after the sentence is served. The involuntary treatment ends when a psychiatrist or court deems it no longer necessary during a periodic review.

In the context of jurisprudence, the Finnish Supreme Court has considered the "brutal or cruel way" standard by comparing the actual crime to "usual" homicide cases. Recent cases have indicated that a single axe stroke on the head or strangulation may not be considered "brutal or cruel." However, causing death by jumping on a person's chest and head or firing over 10 times on a person's torso has been deemed to fulfill the standard.

If the aggravating factors for murder are not fulfilled, but the homicide has been deliberate and premeditated, the convict is sentenced for second degree murder (tappo) with a minimum of eight years in prison. Voluntary manslaughter (surma), is a crime that involves a homicide under mitigating or extenuating circumstances, carrying a punishment of four to ten years of imprisonment. Involuntary manslaughter (kuolemantuottamus) has a maximum punishment of two years of imprisonment or a fine (day fine). In aggravated cases of negligence, the punishment can range from at least four months to a maximum of six years. Infanticide "caused by the mental stress of birth" carries a punishment of at least four months and at most four years in prison.

Participating in a murderous raid can be punished as murder, even if the offender did not succeed in killing anyone. This was confirmed by a Supreme Court rejection of an appeal in a case where a motorcycle gang attacked a rival gang at a pizzeria. The main defendant attempted to shoot three rival gangsters, resulting in injuries but no fatalities. However, other attackers succeeded in murdering three people. As the main defendant took part in planning and preparing the raid, they were also convicted of murder.

== See also ==
- List of murder laws by country
