= Murder in Australian law =

Aspect of Australian law

In Australia, murder is a criminal offence where a person, by a voluntary act or omission, causes the death of another person with either intent to kill, intent to inflict grievous bodily harm, or with reckless indifference to human life. It may also arise in circumstances where the accused was committing, or assisting in the commission, of a different serious crime that results in a person's death. It is usually punished by life imprisonment. Australia is a federal nation and the law of murder is mostly regulated under the law of its constituent states and territories. There is also federal murder offence available in limited circumstances.

== South Australia ==
In South Australia, section 11 of the Criminal Law Consolidation Act 1935 states:

Any person who commits murder shall be guilty of an offence and shall be imprisoned for life.

The legislation therefore prescribes a mandatory sentence of life imprisonment for murder. This is subject to a mandatory minimum non-parole period of 20 years under paragraph 47(5)(b) of the Sentencing Act 2017. The legislation does not define the offence of murder itself. Instead, particulars of the offence are defined by the common law, with some minor variations.

Section 12A of the Criminal Law Consolidation Act 1935 provides a statutory version of the constructive murder rule, providing that a person who causes death by an intentional act of violence in the course of another offence punishable by imprisonment for 10 years or more, is guilty of murder.

Section 12 of the Criminal Law Consolidation Act 1935 provides that a person who conspires or solicits to commit murder is "liable to be imprisoned for life". This phrase (in contrast to "shall be imprisoned for life", as used for the offence of murder itself), is defined in section 5 of the Act as permitting a sentence of imprisonment for life "or any lesser term".

South Australian law recognises some partial defences to murder. The application of a partial defence will result in the accused being instead convicted of manslaughter, for which life imprisonment is the maximum, but not mandatory, sentence. Section 13A provides for a verdict of manslaughter where a jury is satisfied that the defendant killed the victim in pursuance of a suicide pact with that person, subject to some qualifications. Subsection 15(2) provides a partial defence where the defendant believed that their conduct was necessary and reasonable for a defensive purpose, but where that conduct was not reasonably proportionate to the threat that they believed to exist. The same circumstances give rise to a complete defence (resulting in an acquittal) in certain cases where the defendant believed the victim to be committing a home invasion.

The partial defence of provocation was abolished in South Australia in 2020.

== New South Wales ==
In the NSW Crimes Act 1900 murder is defined as follows:

Murder shall be taken to have been committed where the act of the accused, or thing by him or her omitted to be done, causing the death charged, was done or omitted with reckless indifference to human life, or with intent to kill or inflict grievous bodily harm upon some person, or done in an attempt to commit, or during or immediately after the commission, by the accused, or some accomplice with him or her, of a crime...

Under NSW law, the maximum penalty for murder is life imprisonment, with a standard non-parole period of 20 years, or 25 years for the murder of a child under the age of 18. In order to be found guilty of murder under the New South Wales Crimes Act 1900, intent to cause grievous bodily harm or reckless indifference to human life is sufficient to secure a conviction for murder. Reckless indifference to human life is characterised by the awareness of the probability (as opposed to possibility), of the accused's act resulting in a person's death (as opposed to merely resulting in grievous bodily harm). Felony murder (called constructive murder in Australian jurisdictions) and murder by omission are also recognised crimes in this jurisdiction.

Section 23 of the Crimes Act 1900 provides for the partial defence of provocation, and can refer to actions taken by the deceased both immediately before, and prior to, the murder. If proven by the defence where there is a charge of murder, the jury will be directed to reduce the offence to manslaughter. If prior to or at the time of the committal proceedings an offender enters a plea of guilty to the lesser offence of manslaughter on the grounds of provocation, and it is accepted by the Crown, they are entitled to a discount on their corresponding sentence.

However, this is not the case in Victoria, Tasmania, Western Australia or South Australia - the Crimes Act 1958 (Vic), in Section 3B, states:

The rule of law that provocation reduces the crime of murder to manslaughter is abolished.

In assessing guilt for murder, the intention in the precise method in which death occurred is irrelevant as long as the requisite mens rea and actus reus is satisfied. The relevant actus reus for murder is where an act (or omission) has caused death.

The mens rea for murder is:

1. an intent to kill;
2. an intent to inflict grievous bodily harm; or
3. reckless indifference to human life, where the defendant foresaw the probability, as opposed to possibility, of his or her actions resulting in death.

In NSW, a person can also be found guilty of murder if they kill a person during or immediately after the commission of a crime that is punishable by imprisonment of 25 years or more.

== See also ==
- List of murder laws by country
