= Misdemeanor murder =

Term of criminology

In the United States, misdemeanor murder is a term used to describe a situation in which a person is suspected of murder, but there is not enough evidence to convict the suspect of murder in court. The suspect is then either released without charges or the suspect receives a sentence that is similar to a sentence given to a person charged with a misdemeanor. It is not an official term and it is not an offense defined by the criminal code of the United States or any state thereof.

== Florida ==
In a 2001 article, the St. Petersburg Times reported a drifter convicted of murder fifteen years ago had his conviction overturned. The original sentence was based on circumstantial evidence. The reporter refers to the original case as the kind lawyers call a "misdemeanor murder" due to lack of sympathy for the victim who was a teenage crack addict and prostitute, but, in this case, the suspect was imprisoned based on circumstantial evidence and false testimony.

== Louisiana ==
New Orleans is often accused of institutionalized "misdemeanor murder." Article 701 of the criminal code requires the state to release a defendant who has not been charged with a crime after 60 days. Before Hurricane Katrina a few hundred people per year were released under article 701. In 2006, after Katrina, there were over 3,000 article 701 releases although the population had dropped from around 500,000 to around 250,000. Causes include inexperienced prosecutors, inexperienced police officers, poor processing procedures, poor tracking procedures, incomplete reports, missing evidence and an undermanned police force. New Orleans also has a problem with witnesses that go missing before trial and a crime lab that was destroyed during Katrina and (as of November 2011) has yet to be repaired. All of this results in an effective sentence of 60 days for those suspected of murder.

== Texas ==
In East Texas, criminal defense attorney, Percy Foreman (1902-1988) made a career out of "defending thieves, murderers, and wayward spouses". He had an impressive record among those charged with committing capital offenses, which he called "misdemeanor murder". Out of nearly 1,500 men and women facing the death sentence, he lost only one to execution. A Texas legislator once said, "Nobody who has the money to hire Percy Foreman has any real fear of the death penalty."

The Dallas Morning News found that at least 120 times from 2000 through 2006 probation was given instead of a sentence of murder. In Dallas County twice as many murderers were put on probation as were sent to death row. Forty-seven people or nine percent in the county were placed on probation instead of in prison for murder. Most of these murder-probations are given to minorities who murder minorities, especially when the victim had engaged in illegal or immoral activity and when the victim has no relatives or friends. Defense lawyers are able to reduce sympathy for the victim. If the defense lawyer can then induce sympathy for the defendant, a plea bargain will result. This process is aided by the jury system used in Texas, as juries can be easier to persuade than judges. Prosecutors cooperate in order to reduce caseload, knowing the suspects will most likely violate probation making them easier to prosecute later.

== See also ==
- Manslaughter
- Misdemeanor
- Murder

== Legal cases using "misdemeanor murder" ==
- Court Opinions, PEOPLE of the State of New York v. Jeffrey DAVIS, Supreme Court, Criminal Term, Kings County, 1985
- US Court of Appeals, Fifth Circuit. No. 94-50595. Hector POLANCO v. CITY OF AUSTIN, TEXAS, 1996-03-28
- Nevada Supreme Court Opinions, Barton v. State, 117 Nev. Adv. Op. No. 56, 2001-09-12
