= Murder in Chinese law =

In the People's Republic of China, murder is collectively known as homicide and the laws regarding what is classified as a homicide, the punishment for those charged with homicide, and all other criminal law related issues is dictated by the Criminal Law of People's Republic of China. This criminal code’s drafting was started in 1957 and ended in 1980 after several iterations, pauses, and edits. This criminal code encompasses all the crimes that could take place and all other crimes that occur outside of the limits of the criminal code is subject to local courts and judges.

== Jurisdiction ==
Any crime committed on China’s controlled land, water, and air is considered to be under China’s jurisdiction which means it is subject to the criminal code. Foreigners who would commit crime against the China or its citizens are also held liable under the criminal code and could subsequently be charged even if the crime was not committed on China’s territories. Foreign officials with diplomatic immunity will be sorted through diplomatic channels. Other foreigners are liable for all actions whilst in the country and must follow all laws and regulations set by the Chinese government including the laws in the Criminal Law for the People’s Republic of China.

== Degrees ==
Homicide according to the Criminal Law of the People’s Republic of China is split into two categories, intentional homicide and intentional injury leading to death. Intent is crucial as the criminal code directly links the severity of one's crimes and punishments to the offender's intention, regardless of the results. Being charged with intentional injury leading to death, although still a homicide charge, results in a lighter punishment than the former.

=== Intentional Killing/Homicide ===
The act of killing an individual willfully and premeditatedly. This means actively trying to kill another person with intent to do so even if the intent was present for just mere seconds. The means does not matter in this case whether it is with a vehicle, object, negligence, or etc. as long as there was premeditated intent to kill.

=== Intentional Injury resulting in death ===
The act of injuring an individual with willfully and premeditatedly but leading to their death. This means actively trying to injury someone, not kill them, but end up killing them in the process. The means also do not matter in this situation as well whether it is from a vehicle, negligence, or via object if there was only intent to harm and not kill.

There seems to be a lack of other clear distinctions as these two aforementioned degrees of homicide are the only ones included in the Criminal Law for the People’s Republic of China. Other circumstances are largely up to the courts, juries, and judges. Other factors such as manslaughter or an accidental homicide may lead to a lighter sentence but typically is still classified as an intentional injury resulting in death. This lack of distinction could lead to an excessive or lack of punishment since there are not clearer distinctions in the hierarchy of homicide.

A key example of this is shooting to kill someone which would be intentional killing but shooting for the torso, missing, and killing the individual would be an example of intentional injury leading to death. This distinction is a key component to most lawyers’ cases when trying to argue for a lighter sentence for their clients.

== Liability ==
As of amendment 11 to the criminal law Article 17, any individual over the age of 16 is criminally liable for their actions, meaning they are able to be charged with a homicide charge. For an individual who is already 14 years of age is criminally liable and can be charged with intentional homicide, intentional injury leading to death, rape, robbery, and other serious crimes. The same can be applied to someone who is already 12 years old if the circumstances are grave enough. This means at the minimum those 14 years old and up can be charged and be liable for all homicides committed whilst in the extreme cases it can be 12 years and up. The punishments for these individuals are not lightened to compensate for age so all punishments are equal to the crime committed.

Unborn fetus’ typically are not seen as legal citizens with rights until their birth. This means that they do not count as victims of a crime if it occurs to them and therefore cannot be a victim to a murder. The incident leading that could potentially lead to a fetus’ death could be potential grounds for other forms of prosecution.

The criminal code is also applicable to military personnel on the battlefield when dealing with innocent bystanders or those who are neutral in a war is a violation of Article 446. The acts of looting, killing, injuring, or raping innocents during wartime is strictly prohibited and could lead to severe punishments depending on the situation.

== Sentencing and Punishments ==
The punishment for criminal acts of homicide in China varies from the level and situation of the homicide. The typical punishment is either life imprisonment or the death penalty. Life imprisonment is fairly common in most situations but the death penalty is also fairly likely as China is the country that carries out the most death penalties out of any country in the world at over an estimated 1000+ executions yearly although the actual number is classified as a state secret. The method of execution typically seen is either death via shooting (execution squad) or lethal injection. Lethal injections are typically seen more often in recent times.

China is slowly working on removing the death penalty as its main form of punishment as all death penalty sentences must be approved from the supreme court prior to authorization. In the past, execution is typically used as a form of punishment for most if not all crimes, from petty to extreme crimes. The punishment was used excessively as seen as an efficient way to prevent crime as potential crime-doers would fear the death penalty. Now with heavier pushback in the country, many political figures in the PRC are sympathetic to at least limiting the usage of the death penalty for the extreme cases. China has also evoked another law that allows any death row inmate to delay their execution date up to two years to appeal their sentence. These two additional steps are hoped to remove innocent people from death row via verification from the highest judicial order and give more time for the subject to defend or appeal their sentence.

With the establishment of the Criminal Law for the People’s Republic of China being fairly new, only enforced for 45 years as of 2025, there are some holes in the rules for what constitutes as a crime and its severity. Many ambiguous cases are sent to courts and judges to determine a decision and set a precedent. Several amendments have been made to China’s criminal code as find and fix loopholes or missing gaps throughout the years with over 10+ amendments since its enactment in 1980.

== See also ==
- List of murder laws by country
- Murder in United States Law
- Murder
