= Homicide in Israeli law =

Israel had 173 murders in 2004, compared to 147 murders in 2000.

As of 2019, there are six types of homicide defined by Israeli law:

== Murder ==
“Murder” generally applies to causing the death of a person intentionally or indifferently. While a life sentence is generally imposed for murder, it is not mandatory. As a matter of tradition, the President commutes most life sentences to a determinate period, usually in the range of 20-30 years from which a half can be deducted by a parole board for good behavior. Terrorists are not usually granted clemency or parole other than as part of deals struck with terrorist organizations or foreign governments, and in exchange for captured Israelis or their corpses. This has been the case a number of times since the establishment of the State.

== Aggravated murder ==
An aggravated murder charge applies when the murder was premeditated and when it was committed to facilitate or conceal the commission of another offense punishable by at least seven years’ imprisonment, or to enable its perpetrator to escape justice, when the victim was a witness, or expected to give a testimony in a criminal trial, or was a judge in a criminal trial and the murder was intended to harm the legal process, when the killing was motivated by racism or hate based on the victim’s religion, religious group, ethnic origin, or sexual orientation, or on racism toward or hate for foreign workers, when the victim was the perpetrator's spouse, and the perpetrator had subjected the spouse to persistent and systematic physical or emotional abuse, when the act was done with special cruelty, or physical or mental abuse of the victim (id. § 144 A(7)); or when the victim was a minor or under the care of the perpetrator. While the punishment for murder is usually a life sentence, in the case of a conviction for murder under aggravated circumstances, a life sentence is mandatory.

== Genocide ==
Genocide, under Israeli law, is defined as "the deliberate and systematic destruction, in whole or in part, of an ethnic, racial, religious, or national group". Israel is not a member of the International Criminal Court, and prosecutes cases of genocides under its own jurisdiction with the use of Military tribunals. This is due to the fact that Israeli law calls for the death penalty in cases of genocides. The mandatory punishment for genocide is the death penalty. Thus, under Israeli law, genocide is one of the few crimes subject to the death penalty if the offense is committed in war time.

== Murder with reduced liability ==
Applies when the perpetrator, in a state of severe mental distress due to severe and prolonged abuse inflicted on him/her or a member of his/her family by a person, intentionally or indifferently causes the death of that person. Carries a maximum sentence of 15 years in prison. The maximum is increased to 20 years imprisonment when the perpetrator intentionally or indifferently causes the death of another soon after being provoked and the perpetrator had significant difficulty in controlling his/her rage. Similarly, 20 years imprisonment may generally be imposed on a person who causes the death of another intentionally or indifferently when, due to a severe mental disorder or mental impairment, his/her ability to comprehend the nature of the act and the need to refrain from committing it was considerably limited.

== Murder committed by minors ==
Minors who commit serious offenses such as murder can be sentenced to life imprisonment, but it is not a requirement. In December 1996, Rei Horev committed murder at age 17.5 in Kfar Saba. The court ruled that Horev had planned the crime without a motive, demonstrating awareness of his actions and lack of regard for human life. He was sentenced to life imprisonment, and his appeal for a sentence reduction was denied by the Supreme Court. The Supreme Court stated that age was a factor to consider but did not preclude the possibility of life imprisonment for severe crimes. This principle, "minority is not immunity", has been referenced by legal experts in relation to the killing of Yemanu Binyamin Zelka.

== Reckless manslaughter ==
Maximum sentence of 12 years in prison. Applies when there was no intention to harm, albeit the death resulting from the act should have been expected.

== Wrongful death through gross negligence ==
Maximum sentence of 3 years in prison.

== See also ==
- List of murder laws by country
