= Murder in Peruvian law =

Articles 108 through 108-C of the Penal Code of Peru define crimes similar to those known as murder in Anglophone countries. The term asesinato ("murder") is no longer used in the Penal Code since 2014.

== Article 108: Qualified homicide ==
Homicidio calificado, known formerly as homicidio calificado – asesinato, is the killing of another in any of the following circumstances:

1. For ferocity, cupidity, profit, or for pleasure
2. To facilitate or hide another crime
3. With great cruelty or treachery
4. By fire, explosion, or other method which is capable of placing in danger the life or health of other persons

It is punishable by deprivation of liberty of at least 15 years. The specific mention of poison in the fourth provision, and the term asesinato, was removed by Law No. 30253 of 24 October 2014.

Historically, qualified homicide had been one of the only crimes subject to capital punishment in Peru. The 1856 Constitution abolished the death penalty for all crimes, but four years later Article 16 of the 1860 Constitution restored it solely for the crime of qualified homicide. The Law of 11 May 1861 defined fifteen circumstances in which a killing would constitute the crime of qualified homicide, closely following the definition in Article 15 of the 1859 Penal Code. Article 232 of the 1862 Penal Code restricted this to five circumstances, though a separate article also imposed the death penalty for the crime of parricide, which had previously been included as qualified homicide under the 1861 law. Article 15 of the 1867 Constitution subsequently abolished capital punishment again, but it was in effect only briefly before the 1860 Constitution was restored.

Article 21 of the 1920 Constitution continued to permit capital punishment specifically in cases of treason and qualified homicide, but in practice the drafters of legislation only exercised this power for treason. Articles 151 and 152 of the 1924 Penal Code, defining the crime of qualified homicide, specified life imprisonment as the maximum penalty. Article 51 of the 1933 Constitution also continued to permit capital punishment for treason and qualified homicide. However, life imprisonment remained the maximum statutory penalty for qualified homicide until Decree Law No. 10976 of 25 March 1949 increased the penalty to death once again. Other laws in the 1970s further extended capital punishment to other forms of homicide besides qualified homicide, but the 1979 Constitution subsequently abolished capital punishment once again for all crimes except wartime treason. The 1993 Constitution provided that capital punishment could also be imposed for the crime of terrorism, but not for qualified homicide. Furthermore, Article 4 of the American Convention on Human Rights bars signatory states such as Peru from re-establishing capital punishment for crimes to which it did not apply at the time of accession to the convention.

== Article 108-A: Homicide qualified by the condition of the victim ==
The killing of certain government officials, including members of the National Police, the Armed Forces, a judicial magistrate, a public minister, a member of the Constitutional Court, or an elected official, in or as a consequence of the exercise of their official functions, is punishable by deprivation of liberty of between 25 and 35 years.

== Article 108-B: Feminicide ==
The killing of a woman in the context of domestic violence; of coercion, harassment, or sexual assault; of abuse of power or similar; or of discrimination against women, is punishable by deprivation of liberty of no less than 15 years. The minimum sentence is increased to 25 years in the presence of certain aggravating circumstances, including if the victim is a minor, or is pregnant.

== Article 108-C: Assassination ==
Sicariato, the crime of killing a person at the order of another to obtain an economic benefit for one's self or another person, is punishable by deprivation of liberty of no less than 25 years. It is also a crime (under Article 108-D) to conspire in promoting or facilitating such a killing, or to act as an intermediary in arranging one, regardless of whether the killing is committed.

== Contrast with other types of homicide ==
Under Article 106, homicidio simple ("simple homicide") carries a maximum penalty of 20 years. The absence of premeditation is an important element distinguishing simple homicide from qualified homicide.

Homicidio por emoción violenta ("homicide with violent emotion"; Article 109 of the current Penal Code, Article 153 of the 1924 Penal Code) may be compared to the crime of voluntary manslaughter in U.S. law. It carries a sentence of three to five years' deprivation of liberty, except when it also involves the crime of parricide as defined in Article 107, in which case the sentence is increased to five to ten years.

== See also ==
- Law of Peru
- List of murder laws by country
