= Murder in Hong Kong law =

The Offences against the Person Ordinance (Cap.212) and the Homicide Ordinance (Cap.339) are the main statutes that govern homicide. However, no definition of any type of unlawful homicide is available in the Ordinances. As a result, common law definitions remain largely relevant to Hong Kong.

== Murder ==
The definition of murder is identical to that in England and Wales.

The "year and a day" rule has also been abolished. Contrary to the position in England and Wales, there is no time limit beyond which the consent of the Secretary of Justice would be required.

The retention of intention to cause grievous bodily harm as a form of "malice aforethought" (the other form being the intention to kill) was challenged in the case HKSAR v Lau Cheong as being both insufficient in common law and in contrary to the Basic Law and the Hong Kong Bill of Rights. The five judges, sitting on the Court of Final Appeal, unanimously rejected both arguments.

Murder carries a mandatory sentence of life imprisonment, except in relation to offenders under the age of 18 at the time of the murder, who are subject to a discretionary sentence.

== Attempted murder ==
The Offences against the Person Ordinance prescribes a number of specific types of attempted murder, including by using poison, wounding another (§ 10), by destroying or damaging building (§ 11), setting fire to or casting away ship (§ 12) and attempting to shoot or drown (§ 13), which are all punishable by life imprisonment.

Attempted murder by other means not specified in the statute (§ 14) shall be liable to imprisonment for life.

== See also ==
- Murder in England and Wales
- List of murder laws by country
