= Murder in French law =

Aspect of French law

In the French penal code, murder is defined by the intentional killing of another person. Murder is punishable by a maximum of 30 years of criminal imprisonment (no more than 20 years if the defendant is not sentenced to 30 years). Assassination (murder with premeditation or after lying in wait for the victim) and murder in some special cases in accordance with Article 221-4 (including if the victim is a child under 15, against vulnerable people due to age, health etc, in the context of domestic violence, against some professionals in connection with their duty, in a gang etc) ) are punished by a jail term up to life imprisonment (no more than 30 years if the defendant is not sentenced to life). The same punishment is given to murder committed in connection to other criminal offenses according to Article 221-2.

Except for recidivists, the minimum sentence in criminal prosecutions is one or two years' imprisonment, which may be suspended if the sentence is under 5 years. Acts of violence causing an unintended death (Article 222-7 of the Penal Code -Les violences ayant entraîné la mort sans intention de la donner) are punished by 15 years' imprisonment, or 20 years if aggravating circumstances exist (which are the same as those that would make a murderer eligible for life in prison).

== See also ==
- French criminal law
- List of murder laws by country
