= Murder in Dutch law =

Dutch legal policy

Under Dutch law, murder (moord) is the intentional and premeditated killing of another person. Murder is punishable by a maximum sentence of life imprisonment, which is the longest prison sentence the law will allow for, unless the sentence is commuted or pardoned by the Sovereign of the Netherlands. However, this rarely (if ever) happens and few appeals to the King for clemency have ever been successful.

A common misconception is that the maximum sentence is 30 years (or 20 until 2006): this is actually the longest determinate sentence that can be imposed other than life imprisonment.

Intentionally killing another person without premeditation is called doodslag ("deathslaughter", i.e. manslaughter) and carries a maximum sentence of twenty-five years' imprisonment or life if committed under aggravating circumstances ("qualified manslaughter") or as an act of terrorism.

In the first decade of the 21st century a life sentence was handed out 26 times by Dutch judges. All convicts will die in prison unless pardoned by Royal decree. In addition to a prison sentence, the judge may also sentence the suspect to terbeschikkingstelling (literally: entrustment, i.e. to the State), or TBS in short, meaning detention in a psychiatric institution for treatment, sometimes compulsory. TBS is imposed for a two-year term but can subsequently be prolonged for one or two years if deemed necessary by a committee of psychiatrists. Normal TBS can only be prolonged up to a term of four to nine years, whereas compulsory TBS can be prolonged indefinitely.

== Dutch homicide laws ==
The Dutch penal code, Wetboek van Strafrecht ("Lawbook of Penal justice"), specifies the following kinds of homicide:

- Article 97 – "An attack carried out with the intention of taking the life or liberty of the King, the reigning Queen or the Regent"
- Article 108 – "An attack on the life or liberty of the King's consort, of the King's heir apparent or his spouse"
- Article 115 – "An attack on the life or liberty of a head of a friendly nation"
- Article 117 – "An attack on the life or liberty of an internationally protected person"
- Article 287 – Manslaughter
- Article 288 – Aggravated manslaughter
- Article 288a – Manslaughter committed with terrorist intent
- Article 289 – Murder
- Article 289a – Conspiracy to commit murder or manslaughter with terrorist intent
- Article 290 – Child manslaughter
- Article 291 – Child murder
- Article 293 – Euthanasia
- Article 307 – Involuntary manslaughter
- Article 302 — "Praeterintentional" Homicide: corresponding to the German (§ 227 StGB), Italian (art. 584 c.p.), Felony-Murder anglo-saxonne and French (art. 222-7 c.p.) ones.

== See also ==
- Deventer murder case
- Assassination of Pim Fortuyn
- List of murder laws by country
