= Murder in Romanian law =

According to the Romanian penal code, the maximum punishment a person can get for the unlawful killing of another is life imprisonment.

== Degrees of murder ==
Under the new penal code, which came into force on 1 February 2014, offences involving the unlawful killing of a person are classified as:

Art 188 Murder (Omorul) - where no aggravating circumstances exist: punishment 10 - 20 years, ban on the exercise of certain rights

Art. 189 Aggravated murder (Omorul calificat) Murder committed under any of the following circumstances: a) with premeditation; b) for a material interest; c) in order to avoid or to help another individual avoid criminal liability or the service of a sentence; d) in order to facilitate or conceal the commission of another offense; e) by an individual who committed other murders or attempted murders previously; f) against two or more individuals; g) against a pregnant woman; h) with cruelty; i) by taking advantage of the victim's obvious state of vulnerability due to age, health, infirmity or other reasons - shall be punished by life imprisonment or no less than 15 and no more than 25 years of imprisonment and a ban on the exercise of certain rights.

Art. 190 Killing upon request by the victim (Uciderea la cererea victimei) "Killing committed upon explicit, serious, conscious and repeated request by a victim suffering from an incurable disease or from a serious impairment, attested medically, which causes permanent and unbearable suffering shall be punishable by no less than 1 and no more than 5 years of imprisonment"

Art 192: Negligent killing (Uciderea din culpa): 1-5 years; in aggravating circumstances 2-7 years; if against several persons the special limits of the penalty are increased by one-half

Art 200: Infanticide (Uciderea ori vatamarea nou-nascutului savarsita de catre mama) 1-5 years;

Art 199 Domestic violence (Violenta in familie) states: (1) If the acts set by Art. 188, Art. 189 and Art. 193– 195 are committed against a family member, the special maximum term of the penalty set by law shall be increased by one-fourth

Also, violence causing death (where death was not intended) can be subject to Art 195: Battery and bodily harm causing death (Lovirile sau vatamarile cauzatoare de moarte): 6 -12 years of imprisonment.

There is also the offense of Determining or facilitating suicide (Determinarea sau înlesnirea sinuciderii Art 191): 3-7 years punishment; in aggravating circumstances: if the victim was aged 13-18, 5-10 years; if the victim was younger than 13 years of age the punishment is 10-20 years.

== See also ==
- List of murder laws by country
- Crime in Romania
