= Murder in Indian law =

Legal definition in India

In India according to Section 300 of the Indian Penal Code, 1860, murder is defined as follows:

Murder.--Except in the cases hereinafter excepted, culpable homicide is murder, if the act by which the death is caused is done with the intention of causing death, or- 167 2ndly.-If it is done with the intention of causing such bodily injury as the offender knows to be likely to cause the death of the person to whom the harm is caused. or- 3rdly.-If it is done with the intention of causing bodily injury to any person and the bodily injury intended to be inflicted is sufficient in the ordinary course of nature to cause death, or- 4thly.-If the person committing the act knows that it is so imminently dangerous that it must, in all probability, cause death, or such bodily injury as is likely to cause death, and commits such act without any excuse for incurring the risk of causing death or such injury as aforesaid.

On the other hand, culpable homicide (section 299 of Indian Penal Code, 1860)is defined as

... by causing death of person other than person whose death was intended.--If a person, by doing anything which he intends or knows to be likely to cause death, commits culpable homicide by causing the death of any person, whose death he neither intends nor knows himself to be likely to cause, the culpable homicide committed by the offender is of the description of which it would have been if he had caused the death of the person whose death he intended or knew himself to be likely to cause.

== Burden and standard of proof in murder cases ==
To prove that the accused is the murderer is one of the most difficult tasks faced by a criminal lawyer. The mode of proof may take diverse forms, it may be by both direct evidence and circumstantial evidence. It may be through dying declaration, confession, evidence of near relations and so on. One or more modes of proof may be telescoped in a particular case. it may be borne in mind that burden of proving the case initially is on the prosecution which must prove it beyond reasonable doubt.

However, if the other parameters of the offence stands established, then the plea of non-discovery of the dead body of the victim is of no consequence in proving the corpus delicti in murder.

As stated by Phipson on Evidence in Criminal Cases the prosecution discharge their evidential burden by adducing sufficient evidence to raise a prima facie case against the accused. If no evidence is called for the defence the tribunal of fact must decide whether the prosecution has succeeded in discharging its legal burden by proving its case beyond a reasonable doubt. In the absence of any defence evidence, the chances that the prosecution has so succeeded are greater. Hence, the accused may be said to be under an evidential burden if the prosecution has established prima facie case. Discharge of the evidential burden by the defence is not a pre-requisite to an acquittal. The accused is entitled to be acquitted “if at the end of and on the whole of the case, there is a reasonable doubt created by the evidence given by either the prosecution or the prisoner.” The principle that the prosecution must prove the guilt of the prisoner is part of the common law of England and no attempt to whittle it down can be entertained. It’s an essential principle of our criminal law that a criminal charge has to be established by the prosecution beyond reasonable doubt. The philosophy underlying this rule is the oft quoted maxim that it is better than ten guilty persons should escape than one innocent suffer.

The time honoured expression that the court must be satisfied “beyond reasonable doubt” has been accepted in Common-Law countries as the standard of proof in criminal cases. Since the decision in Woolmington’s case the discretion to the jury has been that they must be satisfied of the prisoner’s guilt beyond reasonable doubt if they want to convict him. Lord Goddard suggested in England that this phrase should be abandoned. He had great experience in criminal matters. He suggested that the expression ‘completely satisfied’ or ‘fully sure’ should be accepted as substitutes.

The fourth edition of Halsbury’s laws of England goes so far as to say that the phrase “reasonable doubt” should be avoided. No one has yet invented or discovered a mode of measurement for the intensity of human belief better than this formula of proof “beyond reasonable doubt”.

=== Meaning of expression "beyond reasonable doubt" ===
For a doubt to stand in the way of conviction of guilt it must be a real doubt and a reasonable doubt. A doubt which after full and fair consideration of the evidence the judge rely on reasonable grounds entertained. If the data leaves the mind of the trier in equilibrium, the decision must be against the party having the burden of persuasion. If the mind of the adjudication tribunal is evenly balanced as to whether or not the accused is guilty, it is its duty to acquit.

== Examining rarest of the rare case in imposing death penalty ==
Rarest of the rare case is the principle enshrined in Bachan Singh v. State of Punjab which limits the vast discretion of the court in imposing death penalty. Death as a highest punishment was thrown from a general rule to only in exceptional circumstances and that too after recording special reason for imposing such a highest punishment which cannot be reverted in any circumstances after its execution. The phrase “rarest of the rare” case still remains to be defined while the concern for human life, the norms of a civilised society and the need to reform the criminal has engaged the attention of the courts. The sentence of death has to be based on the action of the criminal rather than the crime committed. The doctrine of proportionality of sentence vis-a-vis the crime, the victim and the offender has been the greatest concern of the courts.

=== Mitigating circumstances in awarding death sentence ===
In Bachan Singh v. State of Punjab, the Supreme Court held that following mitigating circumstances are relevant and must be given weightage in determination of sentence.

- The age of the accused.
- The probability that the accused would not commit criminal acts of violence as would constitute a continuing threat to the society.
- The probability that the accused can be reformed and rehabilitated.
- That in the facts and circumstances of the case the accused believed that he was morally justified in committing the offence.
- That the accused acted under the duress or domination of another person.
- That to condition of the accused showed that he was mentally defective and that the said defect impaired his capacity to appreciate the criminality of his conduct.

Case 1; In State of Tamil Nadu v. T. Suthanthiraraja, the former Prime Minister, Rajiv Gandhi, was killed under a conspiracy and main accused were granted death penalty, treating it as rarest of the rare cases. The mere fact that one of the convicts was a woman and the mother of a child, who was born while she was in custody, was not considered a ground for not awarding her with the extreme penalty.

Case 2; In State v. Sushil Sharma the accused pursuing political career was living with the deceased, a fellow female leader, without claiming her to be his wife. He shot her in the head, and subsequently cut off her head and limbs and attempted to burn them in a Tandoor. It was held that the act of the accused reflected extreme depravity and it would fall within category of rarest of the rare case.

Case 3; In Swamy Sharaddananda @ Murli Manohar Mishra v. State of Karnataka, the death of wife was caused by administering a high dose of sleeping drugs and she was kept alive in a wooden box. Subsequently, she was buried in a pit dug outside bedroom. This was deemed as a premeditated and cold blooded murder but no physical or mental pain was caused to the victim. Hence, case was not considered as rarest of the rare case and death sentence was substituted by life imprisonment for rest of the life.

Case 4; In Prajeet Kumar Singh v. State of Bihar, the accused had committed murder of three children of his landlord and had injured his landlord, wife, and their eldest son. The accused had not paid the due amount for rent and food and when the landlord demanded payment, he lured them into his home and committed the crime. Convicting the accused and confirming death penalty it was observed that helpless victim have been murdered which is indicative of the fact that the act was diabolic of the superlative degree in conception and cruel in execution and does not fall within any comprehension of the basic humanness which indicate the mindset which cannot be said to be amenable for any reformation. The accused was entitled to death penalty.

Case 5; In State of Tamil Nadu v. Rajendran, the accused had strangulated his wife and set his hut on fire. His wife and two children were burnt and witness had seen him coming out of the hut and standing outside as without raising any alarm. It was held that circumstances were indicating that the accused was perpetrator of crime and he was rightly convicted under section 302/436 IPC but death sentence was altered to imprisonment for life as it was not a rarest of the rare case.

== See also ==
- List of murder laws by country
