= Murder in Croatian law =

In Croatian law, murder is classified into 3 categories: ubojstvo, teško ubojstvo and usmrćenje according to the 10th section of the Criminal Law of 2011.

== Teško ubojstvo: Murder with Special Circumstances ==
A person who: "1. murders another in a cruel or treacherous manner; 2. murders a person who is especially vulnerable due to his or her age, a severe physical or mental disorder or pregnancy; 3. murders a family member whom he or she has already abused; 4. murders another out of greed, ruthless revenge, hatred or other base motives; 5. murders another in order to commit or cover up another criminal offence; 6. murders an official person in relation to his or her performance of official duties."It is punishable with no less than 10 years imprisonment, or a long-term sentence (up to 40 years of imprisonment under Croatian law).

== Ubojstvo: Murder ==
This is classified any intentional killing of another human being with no special circumstances. Punishable with no less than 5 years of imprisonment.

== Usmrćenje and Prouzročenje smrti iz nehaja: Manslaughter ==
There are three forms of usmrćenje, or reckless murder:

- A murder that has been provoked - punishable no less than 1 year and not more than 10 years of prison.
- Mother murdering their child after birth - six months to five years.
- Mercy killing - up to three years.

There's also prouzročenje smrti iz nehaja, meaning involuntary manslaughter, which carries a penalty of six months to five years imprisonment.

== Suicide and abortion ==
The criminal law also defines separate penalties for:

- assisting in a suicide
- assisting in an illegal abortion
- assisting in euthanasia

== Sources ==
- Croatian Parliament (2011-11-07). "Kazneni zakon". Narodne novine (in Croatian) (125/2011).
