= Murder in Italian law =

Aspect of criminal law

In Italy the penal code regulates intentional homicide (art. 575 c.p.), "praeterintention" homicide (584 c.p.) corresponding to the Anglo-Saxon Felony-Murder (for exampleIf, << If John commits a felony, that is, a serious crime, and Jim's death derives from this, John is responsible for the most serious form of murder even though Jim's death was neither foreseen nor foreseeable by him. It's a bit like our homicide "preterintenzionale", but the penalties for felony murder in common law countries are much more severe>>), and manslaughter (art. 589 c.p.). <<Thus - to summarize - we see that murder includes murder committed with the intention of producing [...] serious injury, or with the intention of producing that which either can easily produce the other and, therefore, also includes cases in which death is preceded by criminal intent and which is the consequence of an illegal act, which by its nature constitutes a crime. Involuntary manslaughter, however, includes homicide caused by omission, involuntary manslaughter, accidental homicide resulting from an unlawful act which is not a crime, and the like>>.

In Italy, with sentences nos. 1085-364/1988 the Constitutional Court has meant the art. 27 const. and the principle of guilt. Therefore, since then we have been laboriously trying to reconcile criminal law with the new meaning of the art. 27 of the Constitution, confirmed by art. 7 ECHR and 49 Nice Charter; however without satisfying results with regard to the effective re-education of the convicted person, sanctioning appropriateness and subjective responsibility.

== Definitions and penalties ==
According to Italian law, any sentence of more than five years perpetually deprives (Interdizione perpetua dai Pubblici Uffici) the condemned person of: voting rights, the ability hold public office, the ability hold any governmental or para-statal position (articles 19, 28, 29). A convict for life is also deprived of parental rights. Their children are either given to the other parent or hosted in a public structure (art. 32).

=== Life imprisonment ===
Articles 576 and 577 provide for a mandatory punishment of life imprisonment for murder committed under the following circumstances:

1. To commit another crime, or to escape, of favor, or take advantage from another crime (art.61, sect.2)
2. Against a next of kin (parent or child) and either through insidious means, with premeditation, cruelly, of for futile motives
3. By a fugitive to escape capture, or acquire means of subsistence
4. While raping or sexually assaulting a person (articles 609 bis, 609 quarter, 609 octies)
5. By a stalker against the victim of stalking
6. Against a police officer engaged in enforcing the law
7. In a cruel way or through the use of torture (art.61, sect.1)
8. For abject or futile motives (art.61, sect.4);
9. Against a next of kin (parent or child)
10. Through insidious means
11. With premeditation

Cases 1 through 4 (art. 576) had been considered capital murder, and therefore punishable by death by firing squad. Since 1947, though, death penalty was discontinued in Italy, and death was substituted with life imprisonment. Italian law also uses the felony murder rule for various violent crimes, which also provides for a mandatory life sentence. Sentences of life imprisonment are subject to parole or probation. A person that is serving a life sentence can reach libertà condizionata (conditional release) after 26 years, or after 21 years in the case of good behavior. In the most extreme cases, courts can deny the prisoner the right to conditional release and thus order them to spend the rest of their life in prison. Italy is, along with the Netherlands and the United Kingdom, one of the several European nations that provides for life imprisonment without parole for the most serious crimes.

=== Other definitions ===
Besides the criminal murder detailed above, in Italian law the following cases also exist:

English	Italian	Definition	Article
Infanticide	Infanticidio in condizioni di abbandono materiale e morale	murder of the infant immediately following the birth committed by the mother who is in conditions of material or moral disorder, is punishable with a sentence between 4 and 12 years.	578
Killing on demand	Omicidio del consenziente	the action to kill someone with his/her consent, is punishable with a sentence between 6 and 15 years. This, however, is considered murder if the victim, when giving his/her consent, was under the age of 18, intoxicated, mentally disabled, or if the consent was obtained through violence, menace, or deception.	579
Assistance or instigation of suicide	Istigazione o aiuto al suicidio	the action to help someone to commit suicide, or to convince someone to commit suicide, is punishable with a sentence between 5 and 12 years if the suicide succeeds, or between 1 and 5 years if it does not succeed but a body injury has been made. This, however, is considered murder if the suicide is under the age of 14.	580
Beatings or injuries resulting in unwanted death	Omicidio preterintenzionale	occurs when, as a result of a deliberated act of violence not meant to kill (articles 581,582), the death of a person occurs. This crime is punishable with a sentence between 10 and 18 years (art.584). This sentence can be increased from one third to one half (up to 27 years) if a circumstance stated by articles 576 and 577 occurs, or if a weapon is used.	584
Manslaughter	Omicidio colposo	the action of causing the death of a person without intention, is punished with a sentence between 6 months and 5 years. If the victims are more than one as a consequence of the same act, multiple counts can be added up to 15 years in prison.	589

== See also ==
- List of murder laws by country
