= Murder in Portuguese law =

The Portuguese Penal Code was adopted in 1982 by Decree-Law no. 400/82, of September 23, entering into force on January 1, 1983. It has seen multiple amendments, but has been subject of two major reforms in 1995, by Decree-Law no. 48/95, of March 15, and in 2007, by Law no. 59/2007. The Penal Code devotes a chapter on “crimes against human life”, where murder is included; despite that other crimes, in their aggravated form, may be considered, in other countries, to be included in murder. Murder may also be found in special legislation, namely in the Code of Military Justice, adopted in 2003 by Law no. 100/2003, of November 15, and in the Penal and Disciplinary Code of the Merchant Navy, adopted in 1940 by Decree-Law no. 33252/43, of November 20. The Portuguese Constitution expressly forbids the death penalty (article 24, § 2) and life imprisonment (article 30, § 1). Additionally, since 1997, the Constitution does not allow the extradition of anyone who would be subject to any of those two forms of punishment at the requesting country. Unless binding assurances are given that the suspect will not be sentenced to either death penalty or life imprisonment, the extradition must be rejected.

== Homicide ==
Homicide is defined in article 131 of the Penal Code, being the first crime to appear on the Code, simply stating that “whoever kills another person is punished with imprisonment from 8 to 16 years”. Following the general crime of homicide, setting the elements of the fact for the following crime, Qualified Homicide, in article 132 § 1, aggravating the punishment in cases where “the death is produced in circumstances revealing a special unlawfulness and perversity” from 12 to 25 years. Article 132 § 2 defines which cases are susceptible to reveal such special unlawfulness and perversity, namely:

a) When the murderer is a descendant or an ascendant, either by blood or adoption, of the victim.
b) When the victim is the spouse, former spouse, or person of the same or different sex with whom the felon had a relation analogous to a marital bond, even if not a member of the same household, or the other parent of the son or daughter of the murderer.
c) When the victim is especially defenceless, due to their age, handicap, illness or pregnancy.
d) When the murder employs torture or other act of cruelty to enhance the victim's sufferance.
e) When the murder is determined by greed, by the pleasure of causing death or suffering, for personal enjoyment or sexual gratification or any other futile motive.
f) When the murder is determined by racial, religious or political hatred or motivated by the colour, ethnical or national origin, sex, sexual orientation or gender identity of the victim.
g) When the murder takes place in order to prepare, facilitate, execute or dissimulate another crime, or to facilitate the escape from the authorities.
h) When the act is carried out in conjunction with, at least, other two people or when an especially dangerous mean is used to cause death.
i) When poison or any other insidious mean is used to cause death.
j) When the murderer acts with emotional coldness, or reflecting on the means to commit murder, or the intent has persisted for longer than 24 hours.
l) When the victim is the President, member of Parliament, member of the Government, a judge, member of the Council of State, Representant of the Republic, prosecutor, member of the regional parliament or government, the Ombudsman, member of local government or any other service that exercises public authority, chief of any public force, juror, witness, attorney, solicitor, enforcement agent, judicial administrator, a person holding office in procedures of alternative dispute resolution, agent of security forces or services, civil servant, military, agent of public force or person employed in public service, educator, professor, examiner or member of the schooling community, minister of any religious cult, journalist, judge or referee of any federated sport, when the act is related or caused by the exercise of said functions.
m) When the murderer is a public servant (e.g. a police officer) and the act takes place with serious abuse of authority.

These circumstances are only susceptible to qualify the homicide to a more serious punishment, not functioning automatically (e.g. someone that kills their parent at their request commits homicide on request, and not qualified homicide), as they are simply “pattern-examples” (exemplos-padrão). Other circumstances that are subsumed to those “pattern-examples” may also be susceptible to qualify homicide, however any other circumstances revealing a special unlawfulness and perversity that may not be subsumed to those “pattern-examples” may not be construed to qualify homicide, with such an interpretation being unconstitutional according to the Constitutional Court. Following qualified homicide, the Penal Code defines other cases of intentional homicide with a lesser degree of guiltiness:

- Privileged homicide (art. 133) - when the murder takes place under an understandable violent emotion, compassion, despair or other socially or morally relevant motive, such as to significantly diminish the murderer's degree of guilt. Punishment is imprisonment from 1 to 5 years.
- Homicide by request (art. 134) - when the murder is carried out at the serious, constant and explicit request of the victim. The punishment is imprisonment from 1 month to 3 years, and that is not punishable if done by the means established in Law no. 22/2023, of May 25 (regulating assisted suicide and euthanasia).
- Inciting or assisting suicide (art. 135) - if someone incites or assists another person to commit suicide, he or she is sentenced to prison for 1 month to 3 years. The punishment is increased to a prison term of 1 to 5 year, in the case the victim is under 16 years old or has, in any way, their capacity impaired.
- Infanticide (art. 136) - when the mother, under the disturbing influence of delivering the baby, commits murder while delivering it, or immediately afterwards. The punishment is 1 to 5 years imprisonment.

According to the Code of Penal Procedure (article 14 § 2 (a)) cases related to intentional homicide are tried by a panel of three judges, or by a jury, when the possible punishment exceeds 8 years of imprisonment and the jury is requested by the arguido, prosecution, or the assisting party (e.g. the family of the victim).

=== Negligent Homicide ===
Negligent Homicide (art. 136 of the Penal Code), is punishable with a prison term of no less than 1 month and no longer than 3 years, or a fine. If the death is caused by gross negligence the penalty the prison term is of 1 month to 5 years.

Additionally, unintentionally causing someone's death while committing a crime other than homicide may be an aggravating factor of that crime, called “aggravation by result” (agravação pelo resultado), with examples ranging from abandonment resulting in death (article 138 §§ 1 (a) and 3 (a)), punished with imprisonment from 3 to 10 years of imprisonment (whereas the normal punishment is 1 to 5 years of imprisonment), bodily harm aggravated by death (articles 144 and 147 §1) is punished with imprisonment from 2 years and 8 months to 13 years and 4 months (whereas the usual penalty is imprisonment from 2 to 10 years) and robbery aggravated by death (article 210 §§ 2 and 3) punished with imprisonment from 8 to 16 years (instead of imprisonment raging from 1 to 8 years for simple robbery).
