= Murder in Swiss law =

Swiss Criminal Code

Federal Assembly of Switzerland
- Territorial extent: Switzerland
- Enacted by: Federal Assembly of Switzerland
- Enacted: 20 December 1937
- Commenced: 1 January 1942

Amended by
- 01 March 2018

Related legislation
- Swiss Military Criminal Code
- Status: Current legislation

In Switzerland, articles 111 to 117 of the Swiss Criminal Code detail the various scenarios in which the killing of another person is punishable. Articles 112 to 117 are leges speciales to article 111, meaning that when the conditions of one of the latter are met, article 111 will not be invoked.

== Intentional Homicide ==
Article 111 criminalises intentional homicide (Vorsätzliche Tötung, Meurtre or Omicidio intenzionale) and this crime occurs when a person intentionally behaves in such a way that causes the death of another person. It is classified as a felony and is punishable by at least five years' imprisonment.

== Murder ==
Article 112 is first degree murder (Mord, Assassinat or Assassinio) and is a lex specialis to article 111 and envisages a situation where a person has intentionally caused the death of another person with either particular cruelty or an odious motive or goal. A conviction under article 112 is punishable by life imprisonment or by a sentence not under ten years. Murder is a felony.

== Manslaughter ==
Article 113 criminalises the intentional homicide committed by a person in an emotional state, which a rational person would not regard as being overly excessive given the circumstances, which is classified as a murder of passion (Totschlag, Meurtre passionnel, or Omicidio passionale). It is a lex specialis to article 111. The law reads "Where the offender acts in a state of extreme emotion that is excusable in the circumstances, or in a state of profound psychological stress, the penalty is a custodial sentence from one to ten years."

== Homicide at the request of the victim ==
A person who, upon request by the victim, intentionally causes a mercy killing (Tötung auf Verlangern, Meurtre sur demande de la victime, or Omicido su richiesta della vittima) is, according to article 114, punishable by a term of imprisonment not exceeding three years or a fine. It is a lex specialis to article 111. Homicide at the request of the victim is a misdemeanour.

== Inciting and assisting suicide ==
Article 115 punishes a person who intentionally and for an immoral motive incites or assists a person to commit suicide (Verleitung und Beihilfe zum Selbstmord, Incitation et assistance au suicide, Istigazione e aiuto al suicido). The victim's attempt must not necessarily be successful in order for article 115 to be invoked. It is a lex specialis to article 111. It is classified as a felony and punishable by a term of imprisonment not exceeding five years or a fine.

== Infanticide ==
Infanticide (Kindestötung, Infanticide, or Infanticidio), in Swiss law, can only be committed by the mother of the victim either during birth or whilst still under the influence of the effects of giving birth and it is a lex specialis to article 111. It is the intentional killing of the baby by its mother. It is classified as a misdemeanour and punishable by a term of imprisonment not exceeding three years or a fine.

== Homicide through negligence ==
Homicide through negligence (Fahrlässige Tötung, Homicide par négligence, or Omicido colposo) occurs when a person's unintentional behaviour causes the death of another person due to a negligent act or due to the person having neglected to act that a reasonable person could have expected of him. It is a misdemeanour and punishable by a term of imprisonment not exceeding three years or a fine. It is a lex specialis to article 111.

== See also ==
- Crime in Switzerland
- List of murder laws by country
