= Murder in German law =

Aspect of German law

Under the German penal code, Strafgesetzbuch, there are two sections relating to homicide:

- Totschlag, § 212, "killing", is the intentional killing of another human and is punished with five to fifteen years in prison or imprisonment for life in particularly severe cases,
- Mord, § 211, "murder", is used only if the case is especially severe, and is punished with life imprisonment
  ... whoever kills a human being out of murderous intent, to satisfy sexual desires, out of greed or otherwise base motives, insidiously or cruelly, or with means dangerous to the public, or in order to commit or cover up another crime ...

== Background ==
The current form of § 211 StGB was created in 1941 by Nazi jurist Roland Freisler. Before that the differentiation between Mord (murder) and Totschlag (killing) was that Mord was killing "with consideration" ("mit Überlegung") and Totschlag without (StGB 1871–1941). Before 1871 there was no united German state and therefore no common penal code. Many German states defined Mord (murder) as killing "with consideration" and Totschlag without—similar to other continental European countries today (for example the Netherlands). Consideration is similar to, though not same as, premeditation. While premeditation only means that there is forethought or a plan, consideration is defined as a psychological state of mind, in which the criminal is consciously weighing the motives for and against the crime. Under this concept a homicide that was not planned in advance or at least taken into account in advance by the criminal could not be considered to be murder (Mord) under German law (nor would it constitute premeditation). Those were only punished as a grave case of Totschlag. Furthermore, there were disputes as to when and how the consideration should have taken place—before the crime, while committing the crime, e.g. Therefore, this differentiation was considered too vague. The reform was oriented on discussions for the reform of the Swiss StGB, which made the same distinction. It took over the idea and mainly also the wording of the reform commission for the Swiss StGB headed by Carl Stoss in 1896. Also the new differentiation between Mord and Totschlag contains problems. This led to ongoing discussions in the legal community about the wording, the interpretation and also about a reform of the law. There are especially disputes about the question when a motive is to be considered as a base motive and when it should be considered as treacherous (or "by stealth").

If the victim of a killing earnestly wanted to be killed (for example, when suffering an incurable disease) the crime would be Tötung auf Verlangen (killing on demand, § 216 StGB) which would result in 6 months to 5 years in prison (usually suspended) – basically, mercy killing. It however requires that the perpetrator was—solely or mainly—motivated by this demand. In 2002, there was a cannibal case in which the offender, Armin Meiwes, claimed that the victim wanted to be killed. The court convicted him of Totschlag, since they did not see the qualifications of a murder. Both prosecution and defense appealed, the prosecution in order to reach a verdict of murder, the defense in order to reduce the charge to killing on demand. The German Federal Court of Justice, the highest German court of appeal, eventually convicted him of murder because, while the victim did want to be killed, there was still the base motive of cannibalism.

If the killing was due to negligence it is punished according to § 222 StGB as fahrlässige Tötung (negligent homicide or manslaughter). Many cases in this field are car accidents due to negligence that result in the death of a person.

If the death is a negligent consequence of an intended act of violence, it is classified as Körperverletzung mit Todesfolge (infliction of bodily harm with deadly outcome—§ 227 StGB). The penalty is a prison sentence of 3 to 15 years. The crime of fatal injuries, corresponds to the classic "preterintention" homicide: similar to the Anglo-Saxon Felony-Murder (for example, << If John commits a felony, a serious crime, and Jim's death results from this, John is responsible for the most serious form of homicide (murder) even if Jim's death was neither foreseen nor foreseeable by him>>, It's a homicide praeter intentionnel), to homicide "praeter-intentionnel" (art. 222-7 French penal code), to homicide "preterintenzionale" (art. 584 Italian penal code).

== Penalties ==
The penalty for Mord is life imprisonment. Parole may be granted after a minimum of 15 years; typically after 18 years but 23 years or longer in serious cases. In the formulation of the law as of 1941, until the abolition of the death penalty in 1949, death was the mandatory sentence for Mord, with "special cases" being punished with a life sentence in a house of correction, effectively making the sentence discretionary to the judge. Totschlag was punished from a relatively lenient prison sentence of five years up to a life sentence.

The penalty for Totschlag (intentional homicide, otherwise) is currently five to fifteen years in prison and in especially grave cases life imprisonment (minimum sentence 15 years). Life sentences for Totschlag are rare as such an offence would typically qualify as Mord (§ 211).

In lesser cases (minderschwerer Fall, § 213) of Totschlag the prison sentence is one to ten years. The law itself gives one example for a minor case: the killing due to the provocation of the killed person, e.g. if the killed person has beaten the offender or one of his relatives or has severely insulted them and the killer acted under the influence of great anger. Thus, the lesser case of Totschlag roughly corresponds to common-law voluntary manslaughter.

== The criteria for Mord ==
The qualifying circumstances are categorized into three groups:

- reprehensible motive/reason of the criminal (base motives).
- reprehensible means of committing the crime (base means of committing the crime).
- reprehensible purpose/aim of the criminal (base aims).

The first and third group are related to the criminal (täterbezogen), the second to the crime (tatbezogen).

=== Base motives ===
The law mentions three examples for base motives, all else fall under the catchall clause of "another base motive":

- Murderous intent is fulfilled when the only purpose of the crime is to see another human being dying. This motive is very rare in practice.
- Killing to satisfy sexual desires are cases of killing during a rape or killings with the intention to use the dead body for sexual practices. Filming the killing and using the video for sexual stimulation also qualifies.
- Killing out of greed means that the perpetrator kills in order to increase his fortune. This is the case when the perpetrator kills another person in order to rob the victim, or in order to inherit the fortune of the victim, to get the money from the life insurance. Also killings in order to decrease liabilities fall into that category, for example killing a child in order to get rid of the liability to pay child support. From an economic point of view increasing the personal fortune can also be done by decreasing liabilities. The judiciary follows that argument, while some in the legal literature see only the increase of fortune as falling under greed (they would consider killing to get rid of liabilities under "another base motive"). If the person believes to have a legal title to the object or the fortune the act is not considered to be out of greed. The same is the case when the crime is committed out of a bundle of motives, except when the motive to increase the fortune is dominating the crime. Dolus eventualis to kill is sufficient for killing out of greed, except in cases where that would be contradictory to the assumption of greed. For example, killing in order to inherit a fortune, to get money from the life insurance or to get rid of the liability to pay child support can only be fulfilled when the perpetrator has the targeted aim to kill the victim (direct intention, dolus directus of one degree).

Other base motives are all other motives that are on the lowest level, detestable and despicable. The basis for this value judgment is the opinion of the domestic legal community. This has to be decided case by case, taking into account each crime and the personality of the criminal. However, certain criteria were developed. One is the idea that there has to be a gross disproportion between the reason for the crime and the result of the crime. Also the mentioned base motives or purposes in § 211 StGB are used to check whether another motive can be considered as base: Killing out of little or no reason is considered close to murderous lust. Killing to arouse the sexual desire is equal to the mentioned killing "to satisfy the sexual desire". Killing out of envy of the economic success of another person or in order to be able to marry a rich woman is seen as equal to greed. Killings in order to cover up a misdemeanor or an embarrassing situation are seen as close to the motive "to cover up another crime" (§ 211 II 3 Group). Examples: Killing of the wife in order to get another wife, xenophobia, killing in order to avoid to pay a fine, honour killings.

=== Base methods ===
The law considers three ways of committing a killing as base:

==== Treacherous killing ====
The judiciary sees a killing as treacherous or by stealth if the perpetrator is consciously using the unsuspiciousness and defenselessness of the victim to attack them in a hostile attitude.

The perpetrator has to be aware of the fact that the victim is unaware of an attack and is defenseless. He has to act in a hostile attitude. With this definition mercy killings are excluded as well as suicide cases, in which the perpetrator wants to take a close person with him, in a situation of despair. The criterion of consciousness excludes cases in which the perpetrator acts in a heat of passion (affect) and therefore is not realizing that he kills a person that is unaware of the attack. However, an affect does not necessary exclude to consider the killing as treacherous. The criminal has to use the defenselessness and the unsuspiciousness. Only using the defenselessness is not enough. The courts require that the victim must have the ability to be suspicious. That is not the case, when the victim is unconscious or is a child below three years. However, in those cases the killing is treacherous, when the perpetrator uses the unsuspiciousness of the parents or other persons who take care of the person to commit the crime. A typical case of a treacherous killing is an attack from the back, out of hiding or the killing of a sleeping person. A person takes his unsuspiciousness from attack with him to sleep.

In the legal literature some furthermore require an especially despicable breach of trust—which however would exclude hideous attack outside a relationship of trust. This position is therefore considered as too restrictive. Furthermore, the criterion is very vague, since it is unclear what relationship would be considered relationships of trust (for example, should a subverted relationship, in which one of the partner regularly beats his spouse still be considered a relationship of trust). Others argue that the courts are forgetting the subjective element of the word treacherous. They point out that the German word heimtückisch consists of two elements: heimlich (by stealth) and tückisch (treacherous). Heimtücke would therefore mean heimliche Tücke (by stealth; treacherousness). They argue that the killing of a sleeping house tyrant, that is tyrannizing his family, is a killing by stealth but that it could not be considered as treacherous. However, they can not give a definition when a killing by stealth has to be considered as treacherous. They just point to certain cases they want to exclude from murder due to the mitigating circumstances. Therefore, this position is also considered as too vague by the courts. The judiciary maintains that also in those cases the perpetrator is usually aware and uses the unsuspiciousness and defenselessness of the person from attack in an hostile attitude. Therefore, they conclude that a killing by stealth is treacherous, when the perpetrator is aware of the unsuspiciousness and defenselessness of the person from attack in an hostile attitude. However, due to the specially circumstances the sentences is reduced according to § 49 I StGB to 3 to 15 years. Both positions have problems. The position of the literature gives no clear criteria to define the difference between treacherous killings (Heimtückemord) and Totschlag. That leaves it to the judge to decide whether a killing committed by stealth still ought not to be considered as a treacherous murder due to special mitigating circumstances. Therefore, this position leads in fact to a negative type correction. Some in the literature advocate such a negative type correction. Negative type correction means, that the murder characteristics are necessary to sentence someone for murder, but that they are not final. In extraordinary circumstances the court may sentence just for Totschlag, if the case is atypical to the usual cases due to special mitigating circumstances. In the older literature some even suggest a positive type correction. That means that the murder characteristics are necessary to sentence someone for murder, but that additionally to fulfilling at least one of the characteristics the court has to assess the special damnability of the killing. However, the wording of § 211 StGB does not mention an additional criterion of a special damnability (positive type correction). The wording of § 211 StGB also does not indicate that under special mitigating circumstances the court may consider a crime as Totschlag although it fulfills one of the characteristics of § 211 StGB (negative type correction). Therefore, positive and negative type correction are seen by the courts as not in accordance with the current law and are therefore rejected. The definition of the judiciary is clear. But also cases with special mitigating circumstances fall under this definition, for which the lifetime prison sentence is too hard. The judiciary milders the sentence according to § 49 I StGB. However, § 49 I StGB can only be used for mitigating circumstances defined by law, not generally for "lesser cases". Therefore, both positions can be criticized. However, some kind of correction is required to avoid a disproportionate punishment in cases with obviously extraordinary mitigating circumstances.

Examples for treacherous killing: killing with poison, killing of a sleeping person, killing from the back, surprise attack, but also trapping cases (to trap someone to go to another place (flat of the perpetrator, deserted area) in order to attack him there openly).

==== Cruel killing ====
A killing is cruel when the perpetrator causes especially severe physical or mental pain to the victim (more than in usual cases of killing) out of a merciless attitude or cold-bloodedly. Example: A mother who led her child starve to death and planned that cold-bloodedly; sadistic torture to death; burning someone to death.

==== Killing with means dangerous to the public ====
A killing that endangers life or limb of an unspecific number of other persons. There has to be a concrete danger. Example: laying fire in order to kill (usually leads to danger for fireman—therefore for life or limb of persons other than the targeted victim), causing an explosion (in an inhabited area), throwing stones from a bridge down to a crowded motorway. If danger for other people is completely excluded even means like fire or explosives are not dangerous to the public (exceptional cases).

=== Base aims ===
German criminal law also knows the offence of felony murder (intentional killing during the course of a crime, e.g. robbery, kidnapping or sexual assault) which also carries a life sentence. Felony murder falls into the third group of aggravating circumstances (§ 211 II 3 Group: "in order to commit or to cover up another crime"). However the concept of § 211 II 3 Group StGB is broader than felony murder.

Killing in order to commit another crime is also fulfilled when the perpetrator acts with the aim (direct intention – dolus directus of one degree) to commit another crime afterward. Whether he commits it afterward or not is irrelevant. The killing can be done with simple intention (dolus eventualis).

Killing in order to cover up another crime is fulfilled when the perpetrator acts with the aim (direct intention – direct intention of one degree) to cover up the other crime and/or his participation in the other crime. The crime can be an intentional or a negligent one. A misdemeanor is not enough. However, such cases are considered as killings out of another base motive (§ 211 II 1 Group StGB) and therefore also fall under murder. An example is the killing of a witness. Simple intention (dolus eventualis) is enough, except in cases where that would be illogical with the cover-up motive. For example, when the criminal knows that the witness recognized him and knows his name, only the deliberate killing with direct intention (dolus directus of one degree) is compatible with the cover-up motive. When the witness does not personally know the perpetrator (e.g. just saw his face) simple intention (dolus eventualis) is enough for the cover-up motive. In the case of the killing of an accomplice direct intention (dolus directus of one degree) is logic necessity to fulfill the cover-up motive. The cover-up motive is not fulfilled when the sole aim of the perpetrator is to escape and not to cover-up the other crime and/or his participation in the other crime. However, in many escape cases the aim to cover-up is playing a role aside or within the escape motive. Then the cover-motive is fulfilled. If that is not the case, the cover-up motive is not fulfilled. However, such cases usually are considered as killing out of another base motive (§ 211 II 1 Group).

== Crimes with deadly outcome ==
In German law, if a killing happens in the process of another crime, but there was no intention to kill, this is treated as one of several specific "with deadly outcome" crimes, including from the Criminal Code:

- Robbery with deadly outcome (Raub mit Todesfolge) according to § 251.
- Sexual assault, sexual coercion and rape with deadly outcome (§ 178 Sexueller Übergriff, sexuelle Nötigung und Vergewaltigung mit Todesfolge).
- Sexual abuse of children with deadly outcome (§ 176b)
- Arson causing death (§ 306c)
- Causing a nuclear explosion with deadly outcome (§ 307 III Nr. 1)
- Causing an explosion with deadly outcome (§ 308 III)
- Misuse of ionising radiation with deadly outcome (§ 309 IV)
- Causing flooding with deadly outcome (§ 313 II in connection with § 308 III)
- Causing a common danger by poisoning with deadly outcome (§ 314 II in connection with § 308 III)
- Attacking a driver for the purpose of committing a robbery with deadly outcome (§ 316a III)
- Piracy (including air piracy) with deadly outcome (§ 316c)

The penalty of these very grave offenses is a prison sentence of not less than ten years, or life imprisonment.

Other crimes with deadly outcome have lesser penalties: dealt with in other laws and with generally lesser penalties and without the possibility of life imprisonment. They include:

- Battery with deadly outcome (not less than three years, in minor cases 1 to 10 years just the same as with lesser cases of Totschlag, § 227) (intent to injure, no intent to kill)
- Abduction of a child with deadly outcome (not less than three years, § 235)
- Smuggling foreigners into the country with deadly outcome (the same, Residence Act § 97)
- Disobedience of a soldier with deadly outcome (six months to five years, Military Penal Code § 19)

Committing any of these offenses also includes committing the offense of either Mord, or Totschlag, or negligent manslaughter. If Mord, their penalty is consumed by the penalty for Mord, because the penalty of Mord is higher; if otherwise, their penalties in turn consume the penalties for negligent manslaughter and, for the no-less-than-ten-year offenses, also Totschlag, because their penalty is higher.

== Capital punishment ==
Before 1949 the usual punishment for Mord (§ 211) in Germany was capital punishment, except in less severe cases. In 1949, the death penalty was abolished by the Basic Law (constitution) in West Germany. In East Germany the death penalty was abolished in 1987. After the 1950s it was very rarely used.

== See also ==
- List of murder laws by country
