= Murder in Georgian law =

Part of the criminal code of the country of Georgia

Murder in Georgia is punishable under the Criminal Code.

== Homicide ==
Under the Georgian criminal code, homicides are classified into multiple categories. These include intentional killing (Article 108); intentional killing under aggravating circumstances (Article 109); killing at the victim's request (Article 110); intentional murder in a state of sudden, strong emotional excitement (Article 111); intentional infanticide by a mother (Article 112); murder by exceeding the self-defence limits (Article 113); murder by exceeding the extent required for seizing a perpetrator (Article 114); and killing by negligence (Article 116).

=== Intentional killing ===
Intentional killings are punishable by imprisonment for a term of seven to fifteen years, with or without restriction of the rights regarding weapons. For intentional killing under aggravating circumstances, the following punishments are applied:

- Intentional killing: a) related to hostage-taking; b) using means that intentionally endanger the life or health of others; c) attempt at concealing any other crime or facilitating its commission –shall be punished by imprisonment for a term of eleven to fourteen years, with or without restriction of the rights regarding weapons.
- Intentional killing: a) of a woman who is knowingly pregnant by the offender; b) of a minor or a helpless person knowingly by the offender; c) with hooligan motives; d) due to racial, religious, national or ethnic intolerance; d1) on grounds of gender identity; e) by a group of persons; f) against a family member – shall be punished by imprisonment for a term of thirteen to seventeen years, with or without restriction of the rights regarding weapons.
- Intentional murder: a) of two or more persons; b) with extreme cruelty; c) for mercenary purposes or by contract; d) aimed at transplanting or otherwise using an organ, part of an organ, or tissue of the victim's body; e) repeatedly (except for murders provided for in Articles 110–114 of this Code); f) related to the official activities or performance of public duties of a victim or his/her close relative – shall be punished by imprisonment for a term of sixteen to twenty years or life imprisonment, with or without restriction of the rights regarding weapons.

=== Murder ===
Felony murder is when a death occurs during committing an "inherently dangerous felony" such as a burglary. The death could be unintentional and accidental, but is still considered murder because it occurred during the commission of a felony (praeter intentionem). Murder and felony murder attract the severest form of punishment, including the death penalty and imprisonment.

Manslaughter is murder committed without direct intention as in an accident.

Euthanasia is punishable by house arrest for a term of six months to two years or imprisonment for two to five years.

Intentional murder in a state of sudden, strong emotional excitement is punished by house arrest for one to two years or imprisonment for one to three years. When intentional murder is committed against two or more persons, the punishment is house arrest for a term of one to two years or imprisonment for a term of two to five years.

Infanticide by mother is punished by house arrest for a term of six months to two years or imprisonment for three to five years.

Murder that exceeds the self-defence limits is punished by corrective labour for up to two years, house arrest for six months to two years, or by imprisonment for one to three years.

Murder by exceeding the extent required for seizing a perpetrator is punished by corrective labour for up to two years, house arrest for six months to two years, or imprisonment for three years.

Killing by negligence is punished by house arrest for six months to two years or imprisonment for a term of two to four years. When two or more persons are killed by negligence the punishment is imprisonment for three to five years.

== See also, ==
- Homicide
