= Murder in Norwegian law =

Norwegian legal policy

In Norway, an act of murder (mord or drap) is, as in other legal systems, illegal and considered a very serious offense.

== Categories of murder ==
Until 2015, murder was classified and punished as follows:

| English | Norwegian | Definition |
|---|---|---|
| First Degree Murder | overlagt drap | is a murder committed with the intention of taking the life of another, by a person fully sane and aware of what he or she is doing, and having planned the act of murder ahead. Planned murder is punished with up to 21 years of imprisonment, regardless of the number of murder victims. Under special circumstances, like a murder of severe cruelty, mass murder, or if there is reason to believe the offender may commit murder again, additional years of imprisonment can be given. This is known as forvaring (custody). This usually takes place at a court hearing near the end of the sentence. Forvaring (custody) is not a punishment, but a measure to protect the public. |
| Second Degree Murder | forsettlig drap | is a murder committed with the intention of taking the life of another or knowing that death will be the most likely outcome of an action, by a person fully sane and aware of what he or she is doing, without the act of murder having been planned ahead. Murder of passion usually falls into this category. Intentional murder is punished by 6 to 12 years of imprisonment. |
| Manslaughter | uaktsomt drap | is defined as a case where someone has been killed as a result of the offenders neglect. For example, a car driver may be convicted for murder if someone is killed as a result of his or her careless driving. Murder as a result of neglect is punishable by up to 3 years imprisonment, or 6 years in the case of serious neglect. |

== Miscellaneous forms of murder ==
Assisted suicide is generally illegal in Norway, and will in most cases be treated as planned murder, although the punishment may be milder depending on the circumstances.

Euthanasia (aktiv dødshjelp) has been much debated in Norway. Some groups have expressed that it should be legal in cases where the victim is sane and fully aware of what he or she is asking for. Acts of euthanasia, however, are illegal, and are treated as any other form of assisted suicide.

== Current law ==
In 2015, a new penal code came into force. Murder, and other violent offenses resulting in death, are defined in Chapter 25. Violent offences, etc.

== See also ==
- List of murder laws by country
