= Cattle trespass =

Cattle trespass was an ancient common law tort whereby the keeper of livestock was held strictly liable for any damage caused by the straying livestock. Under English law the tort was abolished by section 1(1)(c) of the Animals Act 1971, but the tort continues to subsist in other common law jurisdictions, either in its original form as a common law tort, or as modified by statute.

Liability for cattle trespass is similar to, but conceptually distinct from, the old common law scienter action in relation to strict liability for animals which are known to be vicious. In many of the reported cases, claims for cattle trespass and scienter are pleaded in the alternative.

== History and development ==
The first recorded writ for cattle trespass was issued during the reign of King John (1199-1216). However the tort initially related to the keeping of animals; it was not until 1353 it was expanded to cover liability caused by their escape.

Since its inception, cattle trespass appears to have been a tort of strict liability, and so the defendant is liable irrespective of whether or not they were negligent or otherwise at fault.

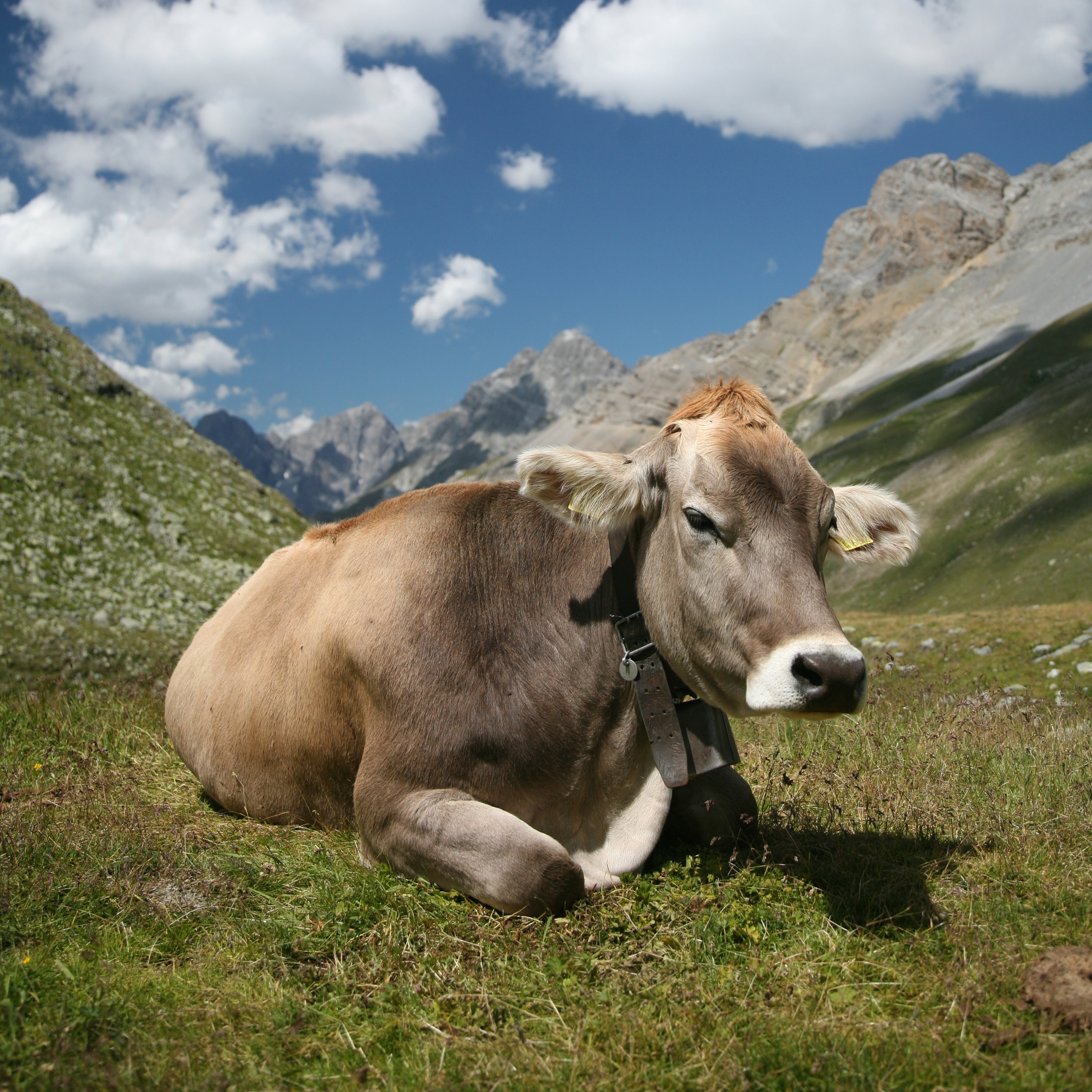
Cattle trespass includes (but is not limited to) straying cattle.

Although the name of the tort refers to cattle, the tort encompasses a wide array of livestock, including horses, oxen, sheep, pigs, donkeys, goats, fowls, geese and ducks. It also has been suggested academically that it would include peacocks, turkey and tame deer. However it does not apply to either dogs or cats. Numerous different reasons have been suggested as to why dogs should be exempt, none of which are entirely satisfactory.

The tort also limited recovery to "damage natural to the species of the animal." Damages contrary to the species of the animal was not thought to be foreseeable and therefore not recoverable. Furthermore, because the action relates to trespass, only the possessor of the land had standing to sue for cattle trespass. Similarly, the defendant against who a claim may be made is the possessor of the animal (rather than its owner).

== Strict liability ==
Although the tort was principally a tort of strict liability, certain aspects of it were fault based. For example, if the owner was herding his livestock along the public highway, he would only be liable for any damage caused by the livestock to neighbor properties if he failed to use sufficient care. However, if the livestock escaped from an enclosure, he would be strictly liable for failing to prevent their escape.

=== Criticism ===
In terms of its historical development, cattle trespass belongs in the same broad of group of strict liability torts for failure to control as Rylands v Fletcher [1868] UKHL 1. Such strict liability torts have been criticized as "anachronistic" in modern times. Whilst a number of cases such as Donoghue v Stevenson [1932] UKHL 100 and Letang v Cooper [1964] EWCA 5 have gradually abrogated a number of the old strict liability torts such as trespass to the person toward fault-based torts which require proof of negligence, no such evolution has yet occurred in English law in relation to "escape based" torts.

Whilst the House of Lords chose to preserve the strict liability elements of the rule in Rylands v Fletcher in Transco plc v Stockport Metropolitan Borough Council [2003] UKHL 61, they also limited claims to damage to property. Had cattle trespass remained a separate tort under English law at the time, it seems reasonable to infer it would also have been so limited. In refusing to abolish the strict liability elements of the tort, the House of Lords declined to follow the position taken by the High Court of Australia in Burnie Port Authority v General Jones Pty Ltd (1994) 179 CLR 520 and abolish the strict liability test.

Further reform at common law by the courts has in England to the tort have been precluded by the codification of the tort in the Animals Act 1971. But it is noteworthy that the Animals Act broadly preserved the old form of strict liability for animal escapes, but that section 4(1) of the Animals Act limits claims to damage to property (and is thereby consistent with Transco plc v Stockport Metropolitan Borough Council.

== Remedies ==
In addition to being able to sue for damages, a person who suffered loss as a result of trespassing livestock was formerly able to seize and sell the livestock under a common law remedy known as distress damage feasant. Under English law that right has now been abolished by section 7(1) of the Animals Act. Although the injured party is still entitled to detain the livestock, any sale must be conducted by public authorities.
