= Ignis suus =

Common Law Principle

Ignis suus (his fire; Latin), sometimes ignus suus, is a common law principle relating to an occupier's liability over damage caused by the spread of fire. It traditionally imposes strict liability.

It was cited in the case Burnie Port Authority v General Jones Pty Ltd at the Supreme Court of Tasmania. When this case was taken to the High Court of Australia, the ignis suus rule was rejected as inappropriate for modern circumstances, had never been introduced into Australian law, and also on the basis it had been absorbed into the Rylands v. Fletcher principle, which was held to no longer be good law in Australia. Both ignis suus and the Rylands and Fletcher rule were found by the majority of the HCA in Burnie, as stated and led by Mason CJ, to be absorbed into the tort of negligence.

== See also ==
- Australian tort law
