= Strict liability (criminal) =

Criminal liability for which mens rea need not be proven along with actus reus

In criminal law, strict liability is liability for which mens rea (Law Latin for "guilty mind") does not have to be proven in relation to one or more elements comprising the actus reus ("guilty act") although intention, recklessness or knowledge may be required in relation to other elements of the offense (preterintentionally/ultraintentional/versari in re illicita). The liability is said to be strict because defendants could be convicted even though they were genuinely ignorant of one or more factors that made their acts or omissions criminal. The defendants may therefore not be culpable in any real way, i.e. there is not even criminal negligence, the least blameworthy level of mens rea.

Strict liability laws were created in Britain in the 19th century to improve working and safety standards in factories. Needing to prove mens rea on the part of the factory owners was very difficult and resulted in very few prosecutions. The creation of strict liability offenses meant that convictions were increased. Common strict liability offenses today include the selling of alcohol to underage persons and statutory rape.

These laws are applied either in regulatory offenses enforcing social behaviour where minimal stigma attaches to a person upon conviction, or where society is concerned with the prevention of harm, and wishes to maximise the deterrent value of the offense. The imposition of strict liability may operate very unfairly in individual cases. For example, in Pharmaceutical Society of Great Britain v Storkwain, a pharmacist supplied drugs to a patient who presented a forged doctor's prescription, but was convicted even though the House of Lords accepted that the pharmacist was blameless. The justification is that the misuse of drugs is a grave social evil and pharmacists should be encouraged to take even unreasonable care to verify prescriptions before supplying drugs. Similarly, where liability is imputed or attributed to another through vicarious liability or corporate liability, the effect of that imputation may be strict liability albeit that, in some cases, the accused will have a mens rea imputed and so, in theory, will be as culpable as the actual wrongdoer.

== In various jurisdictions ==
=== Australia ===
The Criminal Code Act 1995 (Cth) defines strict liability and absolute liability in division 6.

Recent work health and safety legislation creates strict liability for WHS offenses. Also, certain other industrial offenses such as pollution tend to be enacted in terms of strict liability. Most air safety regulations in regard to operators of aircraft and unmanned rockets are enacted as strict liability offenses.

=== Canada ===
Since 1978, Canadian law has recognized a distinction between offenses of "strict" and "absolute" liability. In R. v. City of Sault Ste-Marie the Supreme Court of Canada created a two-tiered system of liability for regulatory offenses. Under this system, the Crown would continue to be relieved from proving the mens rea of the offense. However, offenses of strict liability would grant the accused a defense of due diligence—which would continue to be denied in cases of absolute liability. Further, in the absence of a clear legislative intent to the contrary, the Court held that all regulatory offenses would be presumed to bear strict liability. These are distinguished from *criminal* offences, for which proof of *mens rea* of criminal negligence, recklessness, knowledge, or intention is required.

Following the enactment of the Canadian Charter of Rights and Freedoms in 1982, this distinction was upheld in Re B.C. Motor Vehicle Act. The Supreme Court further held that the inclusion of the possibility of imprisonment—no matter how remote—in an offense of absolute liability violated the accused's Section 7 right to liberty. As with all provincial statutes, offences under the MVA are not criminal offences.

=== English law ===
Under the common law the rule is that crimes require proof of mens rea except in cases of public nuisance, criminal libel, blasphemous libel, outraging public decency, and criminal contempt of court. Where the liability arises under a statute, there has been considerable inconsistency, with different rules of construction in statutory interpretation producing varying assessments of the will of Parliament. But, in Sweet v Parsley, Lord Reid laid down the following guidelines for all cases where the offense is criminal as opposed to quasi-criminal:

1. Wherever a section is silent as to mens rea there is a presumption that, in order to give effect to the will of Parliament, words importing mens rea must be read into the provision.
2. It is a universal principle that if a penal provision is reasonably capable of two interpretations, that interpretation which is most favourable to the accused must be adopted.
3. The fact that other sections of the Act expressly require mens rea is not in itself sufficient to justify a decision that a section which is silent as to mens rea creates an absolute offense. It is necessary to go outside the Act and examine all relevant circumstances in order to establish that this must have been the intention of Parliament.

Hence, the literal rule is qualified, and there is a rebuttable presumption that Parliament intended a mens rea to be a requirement in any section which creates an offense where the social stigma following conviction and the punishment available to be imposed show this to be a truly criminal offense. In Gammon (Hong Kong) v Attorney General of Hong Kong, Lord Scarman rebutted the presumption because public safety was threatened. Hence, statutes involving pollution, dangerous drugs, and acting as a director while disqualified have been interpreted as imposing strict liability. In National Rivers Authority v Empress Car Co, examples are given of cases in which strict liability has been imposed for "causing" events which were the immediate consequence of the deliberate acts of third parties but which the defendant had a duty to prevent or take reasonable care to prevent. If words like "knowingly" or "wilfully" appear in the section, the inference is that Parliament intended a mens rea requirement in that section. But, if words implying a mens rea are present in some sections but not others, this suggests that Parliament deliberately excluded a mens rea requirement in those sections which are silent.

In considering offenses created in the Children Act 1960, Lord Hutton in B (a minor) v DPP (2000), states the current position:

the test is not whether it is a reasonable implication that the statute rules out mens rea as a constituent part of the crime—the test is whether it is a necessary implication.

As to the meaning of "necessary implication", Lord Nicholls said

Necessary implication connotes an implication that is compellingly clear. Such an implication can be found in the language used, the nature of the offense, the mischief sought to be prevented and any other circumstances which may assist in determining what intention is properly to be attributed to Parliament when creating the offense. Necessary implication may arise from not only the statutory provision under review but also from the rules governing that provision to be deduced from other provisions.

Thus, the court must examine the overall purpose of the statute. If the intention is to introduce quasi-criminal offenses, strict liability will be acceptable to give quick penalties to encourage future compliance, e.g. fixed penalty parking offenses. But, if the policy issues involved are sufficiently significant and the punishments more severe, the test must be whether reading in a mens rea requirement will defeat Parliament's intention in creating the particular offense, i.e. if defendants might escape liability too easily by pleading ignorance, this would not address the "mischief" that Parliament was attempting to remedy.

==== Sexual Offences Act 2003 ====
In R v G (2005), a 15-year-old boy was convicted of statutory rape of a child under 13, a crime under Section 5 of the Sexual Offences Act 2003. The prosecution accepted the boy's claim that he had believed the 12-year-old girl to be 15, but he was nevertheless sentenced to 12 months' detention. This was reduced on appeal to a conditional discharge, but, in a 3–2 decision, the House of Lords declined to reverse the conviction.

=== Germany ===
In Germany, strict liability does not exist today since it is not consistent with the "nulla poena sine culpa" principle (no punishment without guilt).

Strict liability in reality it is hidden in certain figures such as the Präterintentionalität.

=== United States ===
As the federal constitution entrenches a right of due process, the United States usually applies strict liability to only the most minor crimes or infractions. One example is a parking violation, where the state only needs to show that the defendant's vehicle was parked inappropriately at a certain curb. Serious crimes like rape and murder usually require some showing of culpability or mens rea. Otherwise, every accidental death, even during medical treatment in good faith, could become grounds for a murder prosecution and a prison sentence.

A serious offense in which strict liability tends to show up is in drunk driving laws; the punishment tends to be given on a strict liability basis, with no mens rea requirement at all. This was important for the purposes of a U.S. Supreme Court case in 2004, Leocal v. Ashcroft, where a deportation order was overturned because the conviction that led to the deportation order was a strict liability law, while deportation was only allowed upon conviction if the crime was a "crime of violence" (where violence, or the potential for it, was inherent in the crime itself).

In many states, statutory rape is considered a strict liability offense. In these states, 22 as of 2007, it is possible to face felony charges despite not knowing the age of the other person, or even if the minor presented identification showing an age of eighteen or higher. The American Law Institute's Model Penal Code generally restricts strict liability to minor offenses ("violations").

However, in United States v. Kantor, which concerned underage pornographic actress Traci Lords, the Ninth Circuit Court of Appeals introduced a "good faith" defense against crimes in which the victim intentionally tricked the defendants into a factual mistake thinking that no crime was being committed. (Note: The case was appealed again to the Supreme Court, which reversed the ruling of the Ninth Circuit panel 7-2 in November 1994. The Majority did not disregard the underpinnings of the "good faith" exception but reversed the lower court's decision because the relevant sections of the law at issue could be interpreted in a way that was constitutional.) A "good faith" defense requires showing that the defendant affirmatively had reason to believe that they were not committing a crime, not simply a lack of knowledge that they were.

== See also ==
- Command responsibility
- Criminal law
- Espionage Act of 1917
- Strict liability (also covering civil law)

== Works cited ==
- Allen, Michael. (2005). Textbook on Criminal Law. Oxford: Oxford University Press. ISBN 0-19-927918-7.
- Carpenter, (2003). "On Statutory Rape, Strict Liability, and the Public Welfare Offense Model". American Law Review. Vol. 53, 313.
- Carson, W. G. (1970). "Some Sociological Aspects of Strict Liability and the Enforcement of Factory Legislation". Modern Law Review Vol. 33, 396.
- Glazebrook, P. R. (2001). "How old did you think she was?" Camb. Law Journal 26.
- New South Wales Parliament (2006). Strict and Absolute Liability (Discussion Paper)
- Ormerod, David. (2005). Smith and Hogan Criminal Law. London: LexisNexis. ISBN 0-406-97730-5.
- Simons, (1997). "When Is Strict Criminal Liability Just?" Journal of Criminal Law & Criminology. Vol. 87, 1075.
- Whyte, D. (2014) Regimes of Permission and State-Corporate Crime. State Crime, 3; 2, pp. 237-246
