= Cambridge Water Co Ltd v Eastern Counties Leather plc =

Case in English tort law

- Court: House of Lords
- Decided: 9 December 1993
- Transcript: Bailii transcript

Case history
- Prior actions: High Court of Justice; Court of Appeal of England and Wales

Court membership
- Judges sitting: Lord Templeman; Lord Goff; Lord Jauncey; Lord Lowry; Lord Woolf

Case opinions
- Lord Goff

Keywords
- nuisance, Rylands v Fletcher, foreseeability of harm

Cambridge Water Co Ltd v Eastern Counties Leather plc [1994] 2 AC 264 is a case in English tort law that established the principle that claims under nuisance and Rylands v Fletcher must include a requirement that the damage be foreseeable; it also suggested that Rylands was a sub-set of nuisance rather than an independent tort, a debate eventually laid to rest in Transco plc v Stockport Metropolitan Borough Council.

The Cambridge Water Company was a company responsible for providing potable water to the inhabitants of Cambridge and the surrounding areas. In 1976, it purchased a borehole outside Sawston to deal with rising demand. In 1980, a European Directive was issued requiring nations of the European Community to establish standards on the presence of perchloroethene (PCE) in water, which the United Kingdom did in 1982. It was found that the Sawston borehole was contaminated with PCE that had originated in a tannery owned by Eastern Counties Leather. Prior to 1980, there was no knowledge that PCE should be avoided or that it could cause harm, but the Cambridge Water Company brought a case against Eastern Counties Leather anyway.

The case first went to the High Court of Justice, where Kennedy J dismissed claims under nuisance, negligence and Rylands v Fletcher because the harm was not foreseeable. His decision was reversed by the Court of Appeal of England and Wales, who cited an "obscure decision" to justify doing so. The case then went to the House of Lords, where a decision was read by Lord Goff on 9 December 1993. Goff first countered the Court of Appeal decision, restoring Kennedy's dismissal of the case, before moving on to the deeper legal points. Based on the original decision in Rylands, Goff argued that it had always been intended for foreseeability of harm to be a factor, something not previously put into law by the English judiciary. He then stated that Rylands was arguably a sub-set of nuisance, not an independent tort, and as such the factors which led him to including a test of foreseeability of harm in Rylands cases also imposed such a test on all nuisance cases.

The decision in Cambridge Water Co made an immediate change to the law, for the first time requiring foreseeability of harm to be considered in cases brought under Rylands v Fletcher and the general tort of nuisance. It was also significant in implying that Rylands was not an independent tort, something later concluded in the Transco case. Goff's judgment has been criticised on several points by academics, who highlight flaws in wording which leave parts of the judgment ambiguous and a selective assessment of Rylands that ignores outside influences.

== Facts ==
The Cambridge Water Company was established by a local act of Parliament, the Cambridge University and Town Waterworks Act 1853 (16 & 17 Vict. c. xxiii), to provide water to the residents of Cambridge and the surrounding area; by 1976, the population served had risen to approximately 275,000. With the rising demand, the company purchased a borehole outside Sawston, constructing pumping equipment and integrating the water from that borehole into their system in 1979. Tests undertaken both before the purchase, and in 1979, had demonstrated that the water was safe for public consumption. During the late 1970s, concerns were expressed about the presence of perchloroethylene (PCE) in water, and as a result a European Directive was issued in 1980 requiring nations of the European Community to establish maximum acceptable levels of PCE in water; the United Kingdom did this in 1982. PCE was discovered in the borehole; it was not tested for earlier because there was no need to regulate the levels. As a result, the Cambridge Water Company was forced to cease pumping the water, and instead find a new borehole elsewhere.

An investigation immediately ensued. The investigators concluded that the PCE had come from Eastern Counties Leather plc, a leather tannery in Sawston. The tannery used PCE as a degreasing agent, beginning in the 1960s; by 1976, 100,000 US gallons (380,000 L) of this chemical were used by the tannery each year, with up to 25,000 US gallons (95,000 L) on the premises at any one time. PCE was leaking out of the drums it was carried in, first by being spilt when it was tipped into the degreasing machines and second by leaking from near-empty drums. Although these spills were individually small, it was estimated around 3,200 US gallons (12,000 L) of PCE were spilled each year. These spills collected in the chalk underlying Sawston until groundwater swept them into the Cambridge Water Company's borehole.

== Judgment ==
=== High Court and Court of Appeal ===
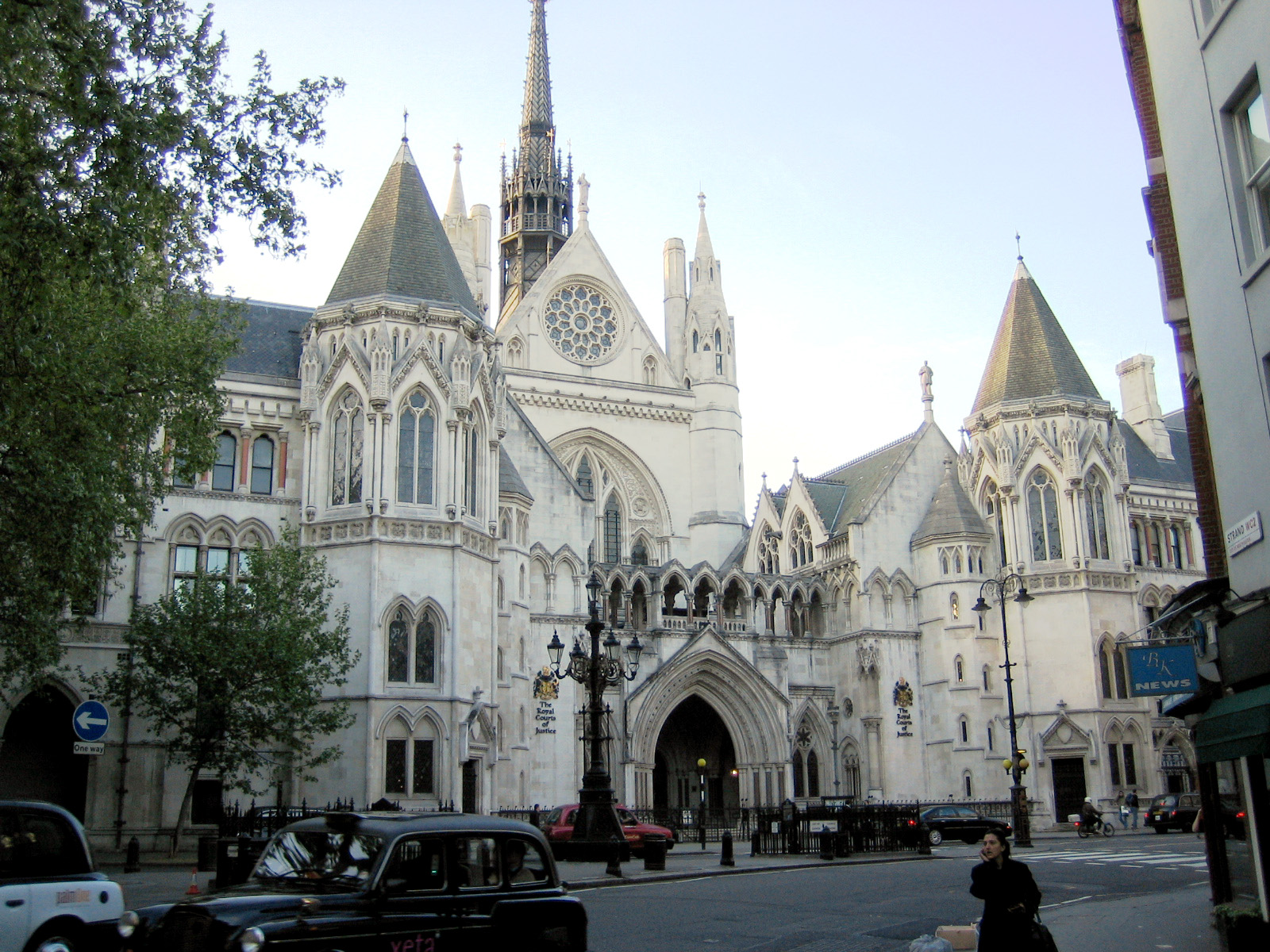
The Royal Courts of Justice, where the High Court of Justice and Court of Appeal are based.

The Cambridge Water Company brought a case against Eastern Counties Leather in the High Court of Justice, wanting £1 million in damages for the cost of finding a new borehole and an unsuccessful attempt to decontaminate the original one, and an injunction to prevent any more use of PCE. They argued that Eastern Counties Leather were liable in three ways; first, in negligence, second, in |nuisance, and third, under the rule developed in Rylands v Fletcher. The case came before Kennedy J, who dismissed all three of the Company's claims. On the matter of negligence, he held that the damage had to be reasonably foreseeable, as was required under Overseas Tankship (UK) Ltd v Morts Dock and Engineering Co Ltd; he applied this same test to the claim under nuisance. Applying the case of Hughes v Lord Advocate, Kennedy found that the harm was not reasonably foreseeable, and both actions under nuisance and negligence must fail.

Rylands v Fletcher contained the principle that "the person who for his own purposes brings on his lands and collects and keeps there anything likely to do mischief if it escapes, must keep it at his peril, and, if he does not do so, is prima facie answerable for all the damage which is the natural consequence of its escape", with a requirement that this use of land be "non-natural". On the Cambridge Water Company's third claim, Kennedy was forced to consider the meaning of "non-natural" in this setting. He held that the use of industrial chemicals was not "non-natural", given that it was on an industrial site, and that for a claim to succeed under Rylands the use must be "some special use bringing increased danger to others, and must not merely be the ordinary use of the land or such a use as is proper for the general benefit of the community"; Eastern Counties Leather created jobs in Sawston, and was thus providing a benefit for the community. As such, the Company's claim under Rylands was not valid. Kennedy also chose to consider foreseeability of harm a factor in cases brought under Rylands, and stated the fact that harm was not foreseeable was a factor in his decision.

The Cambridge Water Company then appealed to the Court of Appeal of England and Wales, but only on the claim under Rylands v Fletcher. The court, composed of Nolan LJ, Mann LJ and Sir Stephen Brown, reversed Kennedy's decision. Despite a lack of comment by the appellants on the claim under nuisance, the court addressed this ground, relying on the "obscure decision" found in Ballard v Tomlinson, concluding that "where the nuisance is an interference with a natural right incident to ownership then the liability is a strict one". As such, Kennedy should have applied Ballard, and it was unnecessary to consider Rylands because the claim under nuisance was valid.

=== House of Lords ===
The case was again appealed, this time to the House of Lords, where it was heard by Lord Templeman, Lord Goff, Lord Jauncey, Lord Lowry and Lord Woolf. The judgment was given by Lord Goff on 9 December 1993, and reinstated the decision of Kennedy J in the High Court of Justice; unlike the Court of Appeal decision, it directly addressed the issue of Rylands v Fletcher. Goff first addressed the Court of Appeal's use of Ballard v Tomlinson, stating that the decision there as based on the facts of the case, and did not establish either a rule that there was a right to clear water, nor that there was strict liability attached to that right.

Goff looked at the relationship between nuisance and Rylands v Fletcher, particularly how they treat strict liability. In nuisance, liability is strict in that the defendant can be liable even if he has taken reasonable care, but this is kept "under control" by the principle that a defendant is not liable for actions a reasonable user takes on his land. He took into consideration an article published by F.H. Newark in 1949, in which Newark called the decision in Rylands "a simple case of nuisance" rather than a revolutionary doctrine that established strict liability outside nuisance. Goff also found similarities between the principle of "non-natural use" under Rylands and that of the "reasonable user" requirement in nuisance, concluding that "[I]t would lead to a more coherent body of common law principles if the rule [in Rylands] were to be regarded essentially as an extension of the law of nuisance".

Lord Goff's judgment was primarily based on whether or not foreseeability of damage should be a factor in Rylands cases, and was that the matter was "open for consideration", saying that the need for foreseeability of damage to be a criterion was "a matter of principle". He considered the case of Overseas Tankship (UK) Ltd v The Miller Steamship Co, in which the Privy Council concluded that foreseeability of damage was an essential part of determining liability in nuisance. The Council stated that "It could not be right to discriminate between different cases of nuisance so as to make foreseeability a necessary element in determining damages in those cases where it is a necessary element in determining liability, but not in others". If, as Goff was stating, Rylands was an element of nuisance, this decision should apply to it. In the original judgment in Rylands, the judge had stated that it covered "anything likely to do mischief if it escapes", and that liability should be to "answer for the natural and anticipated consequences"; this wording implies that he intended for "knowledge to be a prerequisite for liability".

== Significance ==
Goff's judgment made several significant and immediate changes to the law. First, it was the first decision which imposed a requirement of foreseeability of harm to cases brought under Rylands v Fletcher; "it must be shown that the defendant has done something which he recognised, or judged by the standards appropriate at the relevant place or time, or ought reasonably to have recognised, as giving rise to an exceptionally high risk of danger or mischief if there should be an escape, however unlikely an escape may have been thought to be". Secondly, it was the first decision to state that Rylands may be a sub-set of nuisance, and as such applied the same requirement of foreseeability of harm to nuisance, where previously such a requirement had not existed.

Academic Tom Clearwater criticises some of the language Lord Goff picked out of Rylands v Fletcher for his judgment. In particular, Goff's use of "anything likely to do mischief if it escapes" and "answer for the natural and anticipated consequences" to justify his argument that Rylands had always intended foreseeability to be a factor suggests Goff "[overstepped] an appropriate reach of interpretation in drawing his conclusion...most cases gloss silently over the [wording]... three cases imply that foreseeability of damage is not a relevant consideration at all". The reliance on Newark's article was also criticised, since "Neither he nor Goff attempted to justify their opinion with reference to anything external to [the Rylands] judgment". Clearwater points out that the original judgment in Rylands required modification "the price paid for which was legal uncertainty" to make it socially acceptable, which he sees as evidence that Rylands was, despite what Newark says, a significant change to the law.

Peter Kutner, a professor of law at the University of Oklahoma, argues that there is a significant ambiguity in Goff's judgment. Cases brought under Rylands v Fletcher now have a requirement that the harm was foreseeable, but it was not defined whether or not it was sufficient that it be foreseeable that harm could occur, or that it be foreseeable that the use of land is "non-natural", that the substance be capable of doing "mischief", and all the other requirements of Rylands. He also states that the decision did not explain precisely whether Rylands should be treated as a development within the law of nuisance, or something which sprung from nuisance and retains a separate existence. He interpreted the Cambridge Water Company decision as not being sufficient to completely write out Rylands as a distinct doctrine; this was later done by the House of Lords in Transco plc v Stockport Metropolitan Borough Council.

== Bibliography ==
- Clearwater, Tom (1994). "Cambridge Water Co Ltd v Eastern Counties Leather plc: A Case Comment". Saskatchewan Law Review. 58 (2): 333–356.
- Kutner, Peter B. (1995). "The End of Rylands v Fletcher? Cambridge Water Co v Eastern Counties Leather plc". Tort and Insurance Law Journal. 31 (1): 73–101.
- Morton, Sandra (1993). "Cambridge Water Company v Eastern Counties Leather plc". Nottingham Law Journal. 2: 59–62.
- O'Quinn, John C. (2000). "Not-So-Strict-Liability: A Foreseeability Test for Rylands v Fletcher and Other Lessons from Cambridge Water Co v Eastern Counties Leather plc". Harvard Environmental Law Review. 24 (1): 287–313.
- Wilkinson, David (1994). "Cambridge Water Company v Eastern Counties Leather plc: Diluting Liability for Continuing Escapes". Modern Law Review. 57 (5). Blackwell Publishing: 799–811. doi:10.1111/j.1468-2230.1994.tb01975.x. JSTOR 1096638.
