= Hot pursuit =

Urgent chase of a criminal suspect

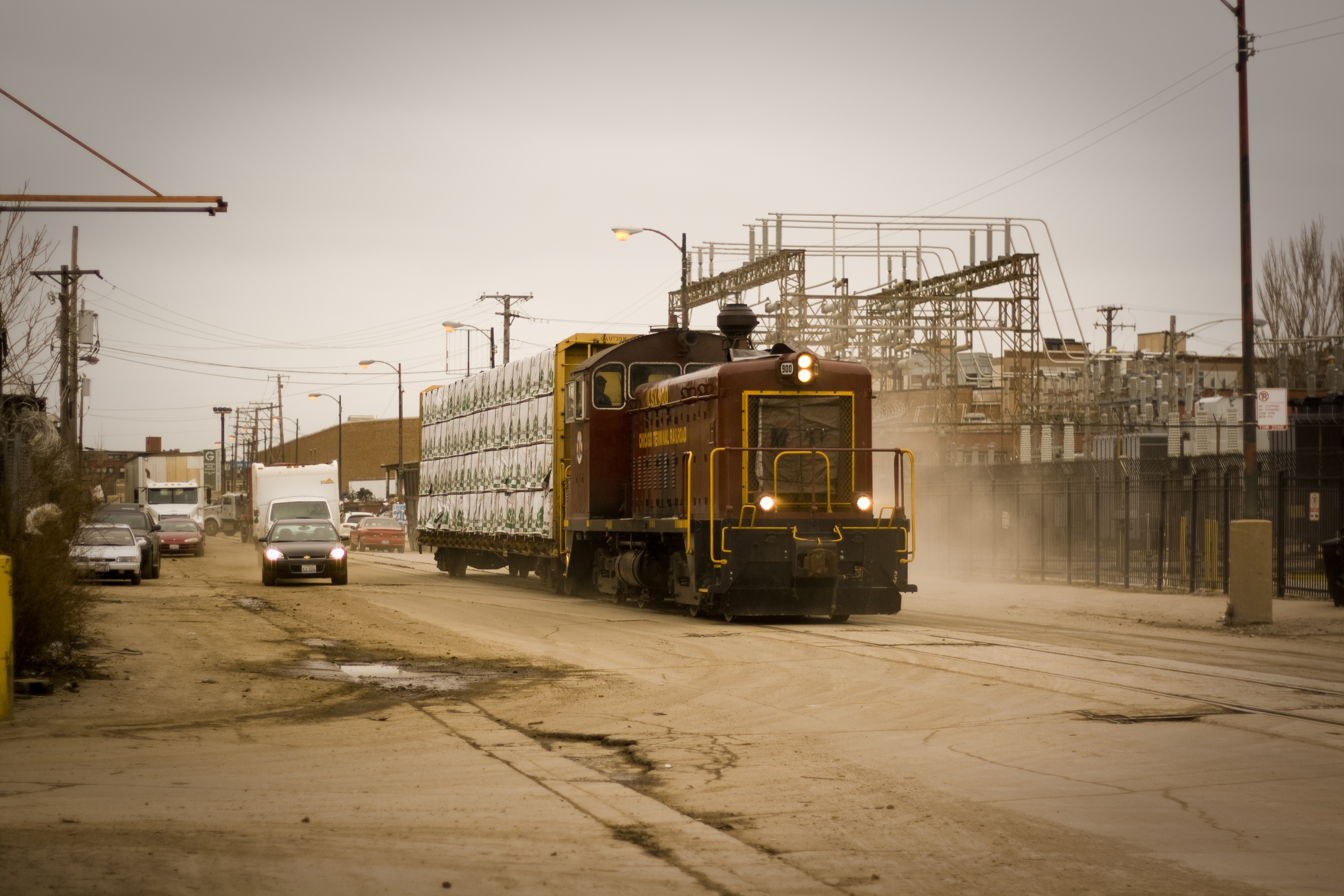
An unmarked police car pulling alongside a large vehicle.

Hot pursuit (also known as fresh or immediate pursuit) is the urgent and direct pursuit of a criminal suspect by law enforcement officers, or by belligerents under international rules of engagement for military forces. Such a situation grants the officers in command powers they otherwise would not have.

== Common law jurisdictions ==
=== English law ===
Hot pursuit has long formed a part of English common law. The principle can be traced back to the doctrine of distress damage feasant, which allowed a property owner to detain animals trespassing on his land to ensure that he was compensated for the damage they had caused. In particular, a case in 1293 held that a property owner could also chase after trespassing animals leaving his land and catch them if he could. Later cases extended this idea to allow a property owner to distrain the goods of a tenant behind on his rent outside his property (in Kirkman v. Lelly in 1314) and peace officers to make arrests outside their jurisdiction.

In 1939, Glanville Williams described hot pursuit as a legal fiction that treated an arrest as made at the moment when the chase began rather than when it ended, since a criminal should not be able to benefit from an attempt to escape.

Because of its pedigree in English law, the principle has been exported to many former colonies of the British Empire, including the United States and Canada.

=== United States law ===
Under United States law, hot pursuit is an exigent circumstance that allows police to arrest a criminal suspect on private property without a warrant, which would generally be a violation of the Fourth Amendment prohibition on unreasonable searches, seizures, and arrests. The Supreme Court first articulated this principle in Warden v. Hayden in 1967.

=== Canadian law ===
The Supreme Court of Canada held in R. v. Macooh in 1993 that the right of a police officer in hot pursuit to make an arrest on private property, which it described as "well settled at common law", extended to summary offences as well as indictable offences.

== International law ==
The international law principle of hot pursuit is comparable in certain respects to the common law principle, but was probably conceived independently. It began to coalesce into a general custom of international relations during the early years of the 20th century, although the general principle had been advanced before in national legislation such as the British Hovering Acts. The participating states at the League of Nations Codification Conference of 1930 broadly agreed on the validity of the right of hot pursuit, but the proposed convention on territorial waters in which it was included was never ratified. It was finally codified as Article 23 of the Geneva Convention on the High Seas in 1958.

The Geneva Convention on the High Seas was eventually folded into the United Nations Convention on the Law of the Sea. Article 111 of the latter treaty grants a coastal state the right to pursue and arrest ships escaping to international waters, as long as:

1. The pursuers are competent authorities of the state;
2. They have good reason to believe that the pursued ship has violated the state's laws or regulations;
3. The pursuit begins while the pursuing ship is in the State's internal waters or territorial waters; and
4. The pursuit is continuous.

If the foreign ship is within a contiguous zone, the Exclusive Economic Zone (EEZ), the Continental Shelf, the Safety Zones in the EEZ or the Continental Shelf, then the pursuit may only be undertaken if there has been a violation of the rules and regulations (customs, fiscal, immigration or sanitary laws and regulations of the coastal state) as applicable in the respective regimes (areas, zones).

The right of hot pursuit ceases as soon as the ship pursued enters the territorial sea of a foreign state.

Where a coastal state, stopping or arresting a foreign ship outside the territorial sea on the basis of its right of hot pursuit, fails to justify the exercise, it shall be liable to compensate the ship for any loss or damage caused to it due to the exercise of this right.

This right is particularly relevant to fisheries management, maritime pollution laws, and the seaborne illegal drug trade.

In addition, some have proposed translating the maritime right of hot pursuit into a comparable right to pursue criminals over land borders. Although it does not form a settled tenet of international law, the principle has been invoked by the United States regarding Taliban militants crossing into Pakistan, by Turkey regarding its attacks on Kurdistan Workers Party bases in northern Iraq, and by Colombia regarding its raid on a Revolutionary Armed Forces of Colombia camp in Ecuador, which led to the 2008 Andean diplomatic crisis.

== Other laws ==
For borders between the countries of the Schengen Area, hot pursuit over the borders is allowed. This is described by articles 41–43 of the Schengen Agreement, although exact details on distance from the border etc. are described by bilateral agreements.
