= Distress damage feasant =

Common law self-help remedy involving land and the seizure of property

Distress damage feasant is a common law self-help legal remedy whereby a person who is in possession of land may impound a chattel which is wrongfully on that land to secure the payment of compensation for damage caused by it. It is part of the law relating to distraint. In some cases the party also has the right to sell the chattel. The chattel may be inanimate, or it may be an animal or livestock.

Any livestock had to be distrained at the time, before they left the land. No cause in distress would stand if the landowner was in any way responsible for allowing the trespass, such as failing to fence off the land.

The remedy principally relates instances of nuisance, and was often exercised in conjunction with certain strict liability torts, such as liability under the rule in Rylands v Fletcher or cattle trespass. In a number of instances, the exercise of the remedy has now been curtailed by statute.
