= Pearson v. Janlin Circuses Pty Ltd. =

2002 Australian animal cruelty court case

Pearson v Janlin Circuses
- Court: Supreme Court of New South Wales
- Full case name: Pearson v Janlin Circuses Pty Limited
- Argued: 21 Nov 2002
- Decided: 25 November 2002
- Citation: Pearson v Janlin Circuses Pty Limited [2002] NSWSC 1118
- Transcript

Court membership
- Judge sitting: Windeyer J

Pearson v Janlin Circuses Pty Ltd was a NSW Supreme Court case, and one of the first Australian court cases to find that mens rea (including intention or recklessness) is not required for an animal cruelty offence.

== Background ==
Mark Pearson (from Animal Liberation Limited) brought this action, and the defendant was Janlin Circuses (trading under the name Stardust Circus).

== Trial ==
Arna, a female Asiatic elephant, was kept isolated from other elephants for several years. Then for a period of time, the circus operator brought three other elephants close to Arna before removing them, causing Arna apparent distress.

Initially, the Local Court dismissed the case, holding that the prosecution needed to prove the circus knew the elephant would be distressed (i.e. mens rea was required). Pearson appealed to the NSW Supreme Court.

=== Issues ===
The Court had to consider whether proving cruelty under s 5(2) of the Prevention of Cruelty to Animals Act 1979 (NSW) required mens rea (i.e. intent or knowledge), or whether it was a strict liability offence meaning that simply authorising a harmful act would be sufficient to constitute an offence.

=== Judgment ===
On appeal, Justice Windeyer in the Supreme Court of NSW held that cruelty under s 5(2) is a strict liability offence—meaning no proof of intent or awareness is needed; the act itself suffices unless the defendant can show reasonable care was taken.

=== Decision ===
The appeal was allowed, and the case was remitted to the lower court for retrial in light of this strict liability interpretation of s 5(2).

== Significance ==
This case established an important precedent in Australian animal cruelty caselaw, namely that mens rea (including intention or recklessness) is not a requirement for an offence to be committed.
