= Manslaughter =

Homicide criminal charge less culpable than murder

Manslaughter is a term in common law for homicide considered less culpable than murder. The distinction between murder and manslaughter is sometimes said to have first been made by the ancient Athenian lawmaker Draco in the 7th century BC.

The definition of manslaughter differs among legal jurisdictions, however is generally differentiated from murder based on the state of mind of the defendant, with the level of culpability for manslaughter decided on the presence or lack of reasonableness and negligence in their actions.

== Types ==
=== Voluntary ===
In instances of voluntary manslaughter, the offender has intent to kill or seriously harm, but acted "in the moment" and under circumstances that could cause a reasonable person to become emotionally or mentally disturbed. Mitigating circumstances, such as when the defendant kills only with an intent to cause serious bodily harm, mitigate culpability. In some jurisdictions, voluntary manslaughter is a lesser included offense of murder. The traditional mitigating factor was provocation; however, others have been added in various jurisdictions.

The most common type of voluntary manslaughter occurs when a defendant is provoked to commit homicide. This is sometimes described as a crime of passion. In most cases, the provocation must induce rage or anger in the defendant, although some cases have held that fright, terror, or desperation also suffice.

==== Assisted suicide ====
Assisted suicide is suicide committed with the aid of another person, sometimes a physician.

In some places, including parts of the United States, assisted suicide is punishable as manslaughter. In other countries, such as Switzerland and Canada, and in some U.S. states, assisted suicide is legal as long as legal safeguards are observed.

=== Involuntary ===
Involuntary manslaughter is the unlawful killing of a human being without the intent to kill. It is generally distinguished from voluntary manslaughter by the absence of such an intent. Involuntary manslaughter typically encompasses killings resulting from reckless or criminally negligent conduct, or from the commission of an unlawful act not intended to cause death. In common law jurisdictions it is commonly divided into two categories, unlawful-act manslaughter, also known as constructive manslaughter, and criminally negligent manslaughter.

Involuntary manslaughter may be distinguished from accidental death. A person who is driving carefully, but whose car nevertheless hits, and fatally injures, a child darting out into the street, has not committed manslaughter. A person who pushes off an aggressive intoxicated person, who then falls and dies, has probably not committed manslaughter, although in some jurisdictions it may depend on whether "excessive force" was used or other factors.

==== Constructive ====
Constructive manslaughter is also referred to as "unlawful act" manslaughter. It is based on the doctrine of constructive malice, whereby the malicious intent inherent in the commission of a crime is considered to apply to the consequences of that crime. It occurs when someone kills, without intent, in the course of committing an unlawful act. The malice involved in the crime is transferred to the killing, resulting in a charge of manslaughter.

For example, a person who fails to stop at a red traffic light while driving a vehicle and hits someone crossing the street could be found to intend or be reckless as to assault or criminal damage (see DPP v Newbury). There is no intent to kill, and a resulting death would not be considered murder, but would be considered involuntary manslaughter. The accused's responsibility for causing death is constructed from the fault in committing what might have been a minor criminal act. Reckless driving or reckless handling of a potentially lethal weapon may result in a death that is deemed manslaughter. The DPP v Newbury case had redefined the meaning of murder in the Australian constitution, and reformed in order to include a mens rea assessment.

As manslaughter is not defined by legislation in Australia, common law decisions provide the basis for determining whether an act resulting in death amounts to manslaughter by unlawful and dangerous act. To be found guilty of manslaughter by an unlawful and dangerous act, the accused must be shown to have committed an unlawful act which is contrary to the criminal law, and that a reasonable person in the position of the accused would have known that by their act, they were exposing the victim to an "appreciable risk of serious injury".

==== Criminally negligent ====
Criminally negligent manslaughter is variously referred to as criminally negligent homicide in the United States, and gross negligence manslaughter in England and Wales. In Scotland and some Commonwealth of Nations jurisdictions the offence of culpable homicide might apply.

It occurs where death results from serious negligence, or, in some jurisdictions, serious recklessness. A high degree of negligence is required to warrant criminal liability. A related concept is that of willful blindness, which is where a defendant intentionally puts themselves in a position where they will be unaware of facts which would render them liable.

Criminally negligent manslaughter occurs where there is an omission to act when there is a duty to do so, or a failure to perform a duty owed, which leads to a death. The existence of the duty is essential because the law does not impose criminal liability for a failure to act unless a specific duty is owed to the victim. It is most common in the case of professionals who are grossly negligent in the course of their employment. An example is where a doctor fails to notice a patient's oxygen supply has disconnected and the patient dies (R v Adomako and R v Perreau). Another example could be leaving a child locked in a car on a hot day.

==== Vehicular and intoxicated ====
In some jurisdictions, such as some U.S. States, there exists the specific crime of vehicular or intoxication manslaughter. An equivalent in Canada is causing death by criminal negligence under the Criminal Code, punishable by a maximum penalty of life imprisonment.

On the mens rea, or state of mind, or the circumstances under which the killing occurred (mitigating factors), manslaughter is usually broken down into two distinct categories: voluntary manslaughter and involuntary manslaughter. However, this is not the case in all jurisdictions, such as the U.S. state of Florida.

In some jurisdictions, such as the U.K., Canada, and some Australian states, "adequate provocation" may be a partial defense to a charge of murder, which, if accepted by the jury, would convert what might otherwise have been a murder charge into manslaughter.

== Worldwide ==
=== Australia ===
In Australia, specifically New South Wales, manslaughter is referred to, however not defined, in the Crimes Act 1900 (NSW). Manslaughter in the Australian legal system refers to the unlawful killing of a human being considered by law to be less blameworthy than murder.

Manslaughter exists in two forms in New South Wales: Voluntary or Involuntary Manslaughter. In New South Wales, in cases of voluntary manslaughter, both the actus reus (literally guilty act) and mens rea (literally guilty mind) for murder are proven but the defendant has a partial defence, such as extreme provocation or diminished responsibility. Voluntary manslaughter occurs when the defendant possesses the requisite mens rea for the offence, and the elements of homicide are present and can be proven, but there are mitigating circumstances that reduce the defendant's culpability. In cases of involuntary manslaughter, the actus reus for murder is present but there is insufficient mens rea to establish such a charge. Involuntary manslaughter occurs when the defendant kills a victim without intending for them to die.

In Victoria, manslaughter is a statutory offence defined in and punishable under the Crimes Act 1958 (Vic). Victoria also has occupational health and safety laws defining workplace manslaughter as negligent conduct by an employer which breaches defined duties and causes the death of a person who was owed those duties. Similar workplace manslaughter legislation exists in the Australian Capital Territory, Queensland and the Northern Territory.

There are two categories of involuntary manslaughter at common law: manslaughter by unlawful and dangerous act and manslaughter by criminal negligence. The authority for the actus reus and mens rea of involuntary manslaughter by an unlawful and dangerous act is the High Court of Australia case of Wilson v R. This case determined that the act that caused the death must breach the criminal law and that the act must carry an appreciable risk of serious injury (actus reus). Regarding the mens rea, the court held that the accused must intend to commit the unlawful act and that a reasonable person in the position of the accused would have realised or recognised that the act carried an appreciable risk of serious injury. Manslaughter by criminal negligence, on the other hand, finds its authority in the Victorian case of Nydam v R, confirmed by the High Court of Australia in R v Lavender and Burns v R. In Nydam v R, the Court described the offence at [445] in the following terms:

In order to establish manslaughter by criminal negligence, it is sufficient if the prosecution shows that the act which caused the death was done by the accused consciously and voluntarily, without any intention of causing death or grievous bodily harm but in circumstances which involved such a great falling short of the standard of care which a reasonable man would have exercised and which involved such a high risk that death or grievous bodily harm would follow that the doing of the act merited criminal punishment.

=== Canada ===
Canadian law distinguishes between justifiable (e.g., self-defence), accidental, and culpable homicide. If a death is deemed a culpable homicide, it generally falls under one of four categories (first-degree murder, second-degree murder, manslaughter, and infanticide). Under the Criminal Code of Canada "Culpable homicide that is not murder or infanticide is manslaughter".

There are two broad categories of manslaughter: manslaughter arising from an unlawful act, and manslaughter resulting from criminal negligence. Unlawful act manslaughter had two requirements: unlawful conduct that caused the death of another person, and an intention falling short of the intention to kill. Criminal negligence is when the homicide was the result of an act that showed wanton or reckless disregard for the lives of others.

=== England and Wales ===
In English law, manslaughter is a less serious offence than murder. In England and Wales, the usual practice is to prefer a charge of murder, with the judge or defence able to introduce manslaughter as an option (see lesser included offence). The jury then decides whether the defendant is guilty or not guilty of either murder or manslaughter. Manslaughter may be either voluntary or involuntary, depending on whether the accused has the required mens rea for murder.

The Homicide Act 1957 and Coroners and Justice Act 2009 are relevant acts.

Voluntary manslaughter occurs when the defendant avails themself of two statutory defences described in the Homicide Act 1957 (diminished responsibility and a suicide pact; provocation was a third but this was replaced by loss of control in 2010).

Involuntary manslaughter encompasses manslaughter due to an unlawful and dangerous act, due to criminal levels of negligence, and due to reckless actions. The unlawful and dangerous act type is by far the most common. The unlawful and dangerous act is typically criminal but would be expected to normally create no injury or only a minor injury (e.g., shoving someone, or a fistfight). Gross negligence manslaughter is rare; an example would be struggling to keep control of a loaded firearm, which creates a risk that the firearm might discharge during the struggle. Even though a person in such a situation did not intend to shoot the other person, they did choose to handle the gun in an obviously dangerous fashion. Reckless manslaughter includes actions that risk another person's life without caring whether the person will die, and overall are considered just short of murder.

=== Finland ===
Manslaughter (tappo in Finnish) is a crime provided for in Chapter 21, Section 1 of the Finnish Criminal Code. Manslaughter is the basic form of capital offense, punishable by imprisonment for a fixed term, at least eight years. Chapter 21 of the Criminal Code provides for a three-tiered capital offense structure: murder (murha; Section 2) is an aggravated form of manslaughter and voluntary manslaughter (surma; Section 3) is a less serious form of manslaughter. The current capital offense provisions in the chapter are based on the government proposal HE 94/1993 vp and entered into force on 1 September 1995 by Act 578/1995. The original 1889 Criminal Code contained provisions on manslaughter in Chapter 21 under the heading "Murder, manslaughter and other assault"; manslaughter was punishable by the house of correction for a minimum of eight and a maximum of twelve years. The Criminal Code was next amended in 1969, which built the provisions on manslaughter on the basis of pure intentional liability and largely took on the form that remained until the 1995 reform.

=== Japan ===
Manslaughter is a crime in Japan under the title of "injury causing death". It is defined as "causing another person to suffer injury resulting in death". The minimum penalty for manslaughter is three years, with a de facto maximum of life in prison since no maximum is specified.

=== United States ===
Manslaughter is a crime in the United States. Definitions can vary among jurisdictions, but the U.S. follows the general principle that manslaughter involves causing the death of another person in a manner less culpable than murder, and observes the distinction between voluntary and involuntary manslaughter.

== Civil law ==
Some civil law jurisdictions, such as the French criminal code, use murder (intentional homicide) or manslaughter (culpable homicide), and a Felony-Murder (homicide praeter-intentionnel). Italian criminal law also provides for murder (intentional homicide, art. 575 c.p.), Felony-Murder (homicide "preterintenzionale" art. 584 c.p.) and manslaughter (homicide "colposo" art. 589 c.p.).

== Historical distinction from murder ==
A legal distinction between intentional and unintentional homicide was introduced in Athenian law in 409 BC, when the legal code of Draco indicated that intentional homicide (hekousios phonos or phonos ek pronoias) was punishable by death. The language is ambiguous as to unintentional homicide (akousios phonos), but it may have been punishable by exile. However, academic David D Phillips says that these categories "do not correspond to the common-law categories of murder and manslaughter either in their original significance or in their present definitions", because under Athenian law intentional homicide would include both murder and voluntary manslaughter.

Anglo-Saxon law recognised particular degrees of homicide, with the worst being forsteall (killing by ambush). Murdra was a separate type of aggravated (secret) homicide under Anglo-Saxon law; William the Conqueror defined it narrowly as a fine that would be charged on a hundred following the slaying of a foreigner (originally a Norman, but intermarriage would end the distinction between Normans and English by the 13th century). By 1348, the association between murdrum and malice aforethought emerged.

"Manslaughter" as a general term for homicide was in use in medieval England by the late 1200s, during which time a distinction was forming between homicide committed in necessary self-defence (pardoned without culpability) and homicide committed by accident (pardoned but with moral blame). From 1390, homicide in necessary self-defence or by misadventure became "pardons of course", meaning that the Chancery would issue them by default. Homicide in necessary self-defence would later be acquitted, rather than pardoned. The use of "manslaughter" to cover homicides other than murder emerged by 1547, in a statute. Edward Coke confirms this distinction in The Third Part of the Institutes of the Laws of England, which remains "the authoritative starting point for any examination of the law of homicide" in the United Kingdom and other common law countries.

== See also ==
- Culpable homicide
- Criminal transmission of HIV
- Depraved-heart murder
- Imperfect self-defense
- Just war
- Moral luck
- Twinkie defense
