= Arrest without warrant =

Arrest that is unlawful in many countries

An arrest without warrant or a warrantless arrest is an arrest of an individual without the use of an arrest warrant.

== England and Wales ==
Section 24 of the Police and Criminal Evidence Act 1984, as of 1 January 2006, provides that a constable may arrest, without a warrant, anyone who is about to commit or is currently committing an offence (or anyone the constable has reasonable grounds to believe to be about to commit or currently committing an offence). The constable is also entitled to arrest anyone guilty of an offence or anyone who he reasonably believes to be guilty of an offence. However, the constable must have reasonable grounds that any of the following reasons make it necessary to arrest the person in question: to enable the real name or address of the person in question to be ascertained, to allow the prompt and effective investigation of the offence or conduct of the person in question, or to prevent the person in question:

- causing physical injury to himself/herself or any other person,
- suffering physical injury,
- causing loss of or damage to property,
- committing an offence against public decency (provided members of the public going about their normal business cannot reasonably be expected to avoid the person in question),
- causing an unlawful obstruction of the highway.
- to protect a child or other vulnerable person from the person in question,
- to prevent any prosecution for the offence from being hindered by the disappearance of the person in question.

Section 24A has similar provisions for citizens' arrests but the reasons permitted for arrest by anyone other than a constable are limited to preventing the person in question from causing injury to the arrestor, themselves or to others; preventing property damage; or preventing the person in question from making off before a constable can assume responsibility for him.

The definition of an arrest, however, is contained in the judgement of Lord Diplock in Holgate-Mohammed v Duke, where he stated that an arrest is "a continuing act; it starts with the arrester taking a person into his custody, (sc. by action or words restraining him from moving anywhere beyond the arrester's control), and it continues until the person so restrained is either released from custody or, having been brought before a magistrate, is remanded in custody by the magistrate's judicial act."

== India ==
Section 35 of the Bharatiya Nagarik Suraksha Sanhita of 2023 empowers police to arrest an individual without warrant or orders from a magistrate under certain circumstances including:

- an officer personally witnesses the commission of a crime;
- a credible complaint has been made or a reasonable suspicion exists, and an arrest is necessary to prevent further criminal activity or promote the criminal investigation;
- a person has been declared a criminal by an authorized state authority.

Section 35 specifically bars arrests of persons who are infirm or over the age of 65 without a warrant.

== The Philippines ==
In the Philippines, as provided in Rule 113, Section 5 of the 2000 Revised Rules of Criminal Procedure, a peace officer or a private person may, without a warrant, arrest a person:

- When, in his presence, the person to be arrested has committed, is actually committing, or is attempting to commit an offense (in flagrante delicto arrest);
- When an offense has just been committed and he has probable cause to believe based on personal knowledge of facts or circumstances that the person to be arrested has committed it (hot pursuit arrest); and
- When the person to be arrested is a prisoner who has escaped from a penal establishment or place where he is serving final judgment or is temporarily confined while his case is pending, or has escaped while being transferred from one confinement to another.

Also as provided within the Revised Rules are other instances of lawful arrests without warrant:

- If a person lawfully arrested escapes or is rescued, any person may immediately pursue or retake him without a warrant at any time and in any place within the Philippines
- For the purpose of surrendering the accused, the bondsmen may arrest him or, upon written authority endorsed on a certified copy of the undertaking, cause him to be arrested by a police officer or any other person of suitable age and discretion
- An accused released on bail may be rearrested without the necessity of a warrant if he attempts to depart from the Philippines without permission of the court where the case is pending

== United States ==
In the United States, an arrest without a warrant still requires probable cause – in the case of an arrest without a warrant, probable cause must be promptly filed.

An arrest without warrant is generally allowed when:

- The person has committed a felony or misdemeanor, and the officer has witnessed it
- A felony has been committed and the officer reasonably believes, known as probable cause, the person being arrested is the one who has committed it, as long as immediately after a warrant is obtained from the court.
- A violation of traffic law seen by the officer.
- When a suspect is in their home but one of the exigent circumstances occur; this is when an officer has reason to believe the suspect is escaping (requiring the officer to engage in "hot pursuit"), evidence is being destroyed, and when a person inside is in danger of being harmed.

== See also ==
- Powers of the police in England and Wales
- Right to silence in England and Wales
- Individuals with powers of arrest
- Right to silence in the United States
