= Ainsworth Mill, Breightmet =

Cotton mill in Greater Manchester, England

Ainsworth Mill
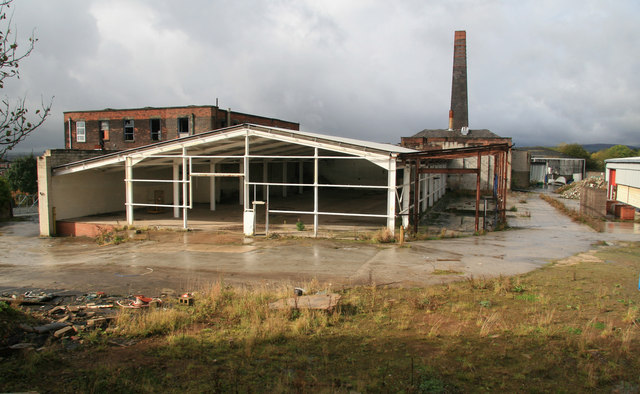

- Location in Greater Manchester

Mercerising
- Location: Ainsworth, Bury adjacent to Breightmet, Bolton, Greater Manchester, England
- Further ownership: Lancashire Cotton Corporation (1930s); Courtaulds (1964)
- Coordinates: 53.5784°N 2.3710°W

Ainsworth Mill, Breightmet is a mercerising mill near the Breightmet neighborhood of Bolton, Greater Manchester. It was bought by the Lancashire Cotton Corporation in the 1940s as an attempt to develop a cotton finishing presence.

== Location ==
Breightmet is a small town 3 km (1.9 mi) to the east on Bolton town centre and 6 km (3.7 mi) west of Bury. The Ainsworth estate though physically attached to Breightment is for administrative purposes in the Metropolitan Borough of Bury. The early name Bolton le Moors described the position of the town amid the low hills on the edge of the West Pennine Moors south east of Rivington Pike (456 m). Breightmet lies on relatively flat land on west of the clough or steep-banked valley through which the Bradshaw Brook flows in a southerly direction towards the River Tonge and then the River Irwell. The geological formation around Breightmet consists of sandstones of the Carboniferous series and coal measures, to the north of Bolton Bury road the lower coal measures are mixed with underlying Millstone Grit.

== History ==
The site was in use in 1850. It was reconfigured in 1893. It was driven by a condensing stationary steam engine which required a reservoir or mill lodge to contain water to condense the steam; this was filled in the 1970s. The mill took advantage of the copious soft water to engage in finishing yarn or fabric. The processes involved bleaching, mercerising and dyeing. The industry peaked in 1912 when it produced 8 billion yards of cloth. The great war of 1914–1918 halted the supply of raw cotton, and the British government encouraged its colonies to build mills to spin and weave cotton. The war over, Lancashire never regained its markets. The independent mills were struggling. The Bank of England set up the Lancashire Cotton Corporation in 1929 to attempt to rationalise and save the industry. Ainsworth Mill, Breightmet was one of 104 mills bought last by the LCC. It one of the 53 mills that LCC owned in 1950, and was extensively refurbished to provide a mercerising facility. They established a research and quality control laboratory here to service the group and ensure the stability of the colour. Yarn was received from other mills in the group in warp or in hank, and is mercerised, bleached and dyed, then wrapped into hank, cone, quiller pirn, back beam, weaver's beam, cheese or precision wound multiple end cheese as required. On LCC demise, Ainsworth Mill continued in business as a bleaching and dyeing work until the dyeing company that went into liquidation in 2006. The works is derelict, but surveys have been done showing an intention to bring the mill back into industrial use.

== Mercerisation ==
Mercerisation is a treatment for cotton fabric and thread that gives fabric a lustrous appearance. The process is applied to materials like cotton or hemp. The process was devised in 1844 by John Mercer of Great Harwood, Lancashire, who treated cotton fibres with sodium hydroxide. The treatment caused the fibres to swell, which in Mercer's version of the process shrunk the overall fabric size and made it stronger and easier to dye. In 1890 H. A. Lowe held the yarn under tension during treatment. This prevented shrinking and gave the yarn or resulting fabric a lustrous appearance. Mercerisation alters the chemical structure of the fibre, inter-convertings from alpha-cellulose to a thermodynamically more favorable beta-cellulose polymorph thus swelling of the cell wall. This increases the surface area and reflectance, and gives the fibre a softer feel.

== Architecture ==
A ten bay three storey early mill, with triple pitch roof and one internal stair column. The engine house is separate and possesses a square chimney.

== Owners ==
- Blackshaw Dyeing and Finishing Co
- Ainsworth Mercerising Co
- Lancashire Cotton Corporation (1930's-1964)

== See also ==
- Textile manufacturing
- Cotton Mill

== Bibliography ==
- Dunkerley, Philip (2009). "Dunkerley-Tuson Family Website, The Regent Cotton Mill, Failsworth". Archived from the original on 12 February 2009.
- LCC (1951). The mills and organisation of the Lancashire Cotton Corporation Limited. Blackfriars House, Manchester: Lancashire Cotton Corporation Limited.
- Roberts, A S (1921), "Arthur Robert's Engine List", Arthur Roberts Black Book., One guy from Barlick-Book Transcription, archived from the original on 23 July 2011
