= Preterintention =

Concept in criminal law

Preterintention (or preterintentionality) is a feature of criminal law in several legal traditions that describes a situation wherein a criminal perpetrator intends to commit a crime, but unintentionally commits a crime of greater severity than the one they originally intended. For example, an unintentional homicide committed during an attempted robbery.

The concept occurs in various European and Latin American legal systems, including Belgium, Brazil, Ecuador, France, Germany, Italy, and Spain, but the term is obsolete in English.

== History ==
The concept of preterintention has roots in Roman law, and was also known in the Middle Ages.

== By country ==
=== Belgium ===
In Belgian law, every criminal offense has a "moral element" (French: élément morale) (Note: "Moral element" – corresponds to mens rea in common law legal systems; roughly, criminal intent. Compare moral element in French criminal law.) or type of intent, which affects the level of criminal responsibility that can be imputed to the perpetrator. The moral element is subdivided into four types: general intent (dol général), specific intent (dol spéciale), negligence (faute) with or without premeditation, and a fourth type, known as preterintentional offenses (infractions praeter-intentionelles).

Preterintentional offenses have combined elements of both dol (intent) and faute (negligence). The classic example is in article 401 of the Belgian criminal code:

When blows or injuries are inflicted intentionally, but without the intention of causing death, and nevertheless result in death, the guilty party shall be punished by imprisonment for a term of five to ten years. (Note: Article 401: "Lorsque les coups ou les blessures faites volontairement, mais sans intention de donner la mort, l'ont pourtant causée, le coupable sera puni de la réclusion de cinq à dix ans."Colette-Basecqz & Bruyndonckx (2016) p. 1573)

Belgium has a unique case of preterintentional offense regarding pharmaceuticals or other potentially toxic substances in article 402 of the code. This article lays out specific criminal penalties for anyone who, without intending to kill, intentionally injects or administers any medication or substance that is potentially lethal or could have serious consequences to health, and without intending to, ends up causing the recipient to become sick or incapacitated and unable to work. (Note: Note: article 401 under the old system will become art 197 and part of 198 under the code introduced in Feb. 2024, due to become effective 8 April 2026, according to Beernaert & Vandermeersch.)

=== Brazil ===
In the Brazilian criminal justice system, the term dolo refers to a "guilty mind", the mental state or subjective intent (mens rea) of a perpetrator in committing a criminal offense; that is, the resolve to violate the law, by action or omission, with full knowledge of the criminality of what is being done.

Three levels of intent with respect to a crime and its outcome are recognized. In direct intent (dolo direto), the perpetrator intends to carry out a crime and the result is exactly as expected. In indirect intent (dolo eventual), the perpetrator may not plan or intend a criminal outcome, but acts with the understanding that it is a possibility and accepts the risk of it turning out that way. The third type is preterdolo—less often termed preterintenção (preterintention)—in which the perpetrator acts intentionally in a way to knowingly produce a criminal result, but the outcome turns out to be a more serious crime than what they had intended.

=== Ecuador ===
Ecuadorian law recognizes three levels of blameworthiness regarding intent in the commission of a criminal offense: dolo (roughly, with malice), culpa (negligence), and preterintención, with the latter being a kind of combination of the other two. In practice, preterintention is problematic in several ways: it is poorly applied, there is no precise codification of what behavior actually qualifies as preterintentional, and there are some theoretical concerns regarding conflicts between preterintention and the legal principles of culpability and legality in Ecuadorian law.

=== Italy ===
Murder in the House (1890), by Jakub Schikaneder

In Italian criminal law, intent plays a large role in defining what the punishment is for a criminal offense. Article 43 of the Italian penal code divides criminal offenses into three categories based on how the perpetrator's intent to commit a criminal act compares with the actual result of their action (or omission). Where their criminal intent lines up exactly with the result, that is defined as an intentional crime (Italian: dolo). Where there is no intent to commit one but the result is a crime, this is defined as negligence (colpa). Finally, when a perpetrator intends to commit a crime of a certain level of gravity, but the result ends up being a more severe crime, that is known as preterintention (preterintenzione). The only two crimes where preterintention can be imputed to the perpetrator are in the cases of abortion (aborto preterintenzionale)) and murder (omicidio preterintenzionale).

== See also ==
- Aggravating circumstance
- Depraved-heart murder
- Implied malice
- Malice aforethought
- Model Penal Code
- Negligence
- Felony murder rule
- Transferred intent
