= Sweet v Parsley =

English legal case concerning liability

- Court: House of Lords
- Decided: 1970
- Citation: AC 132, HL
- Transcript: Judgment

Sweet v Parsley was an important English criminal law case concerning the reaffirming of presumption of mens rea in criminal law. The case defendant landlady of a farmhouse (which was let to students and which she visited infrequently) was charged under a 1965 Act "of having been concerned in the management of premises used for smoking cannabis".

Even though she had neither knowledge of nor privity with the offence, it took place on her property and at first instance she was convicted, being deemed "liable without fault". This conviction was later quashed by the House of Lords on the grounds that knowledge of the use of the premises was essential to the offence. Since she had no such knowledge, she did not commit the offence as the presumption that mens rea was required was rebutted. Effectively the absence of express words imposing the requirement of proving mens rea is not conclusive that the offence is one of strict liability.

== Requirement of mens rea ==
Lord Reid declared:

... there has for centuries been a presumption that Parliament did not intend to make criminals of persons who were in no way blameworthy in what they did. That means that whenever a section is silent as to mens rea there is a presumption that, in order to give effect to the will of Parliament, we must read in words appropriate to require mens rea... it is firmly established by a host of authorities that mens rea is an essential ingredient of every offence unless some reason can be found for holding that that is not necessary.

The case's significance in English criminal law is that it sets out new set guidelines for determining whether an offence is one of strict liability or whether mens rea is a presumed requirement. / Lord Reid laid down the following guidelines for all cases where the offence is criminal as opposed to quasi-criminal:

1. Wherever a section is silent as to mens rea there is a presumption that, in order to give effect to the will of Parliament, words importing mens rea must be read into the provision.
2. It is a universal principle that if a penal provision is reasonably capable of two interpretations, that interpretation which is most favourable to the accused must be adopted.
3. The fact that other sections of the Act expressly require mens rea is not in itself sufficient to justify a decision that a section which is silent as to mens rea creates an absolute offence. It is necessary to go outside the Act and examine all relevant circumstances in order to establish that this must have been the intention of Parliament.

== See also ==
- Fault (legal)
- Strict liability (criminal)
