= Rylands v Fletcher =

Landmark House of Lords decision on strict liability in tort law

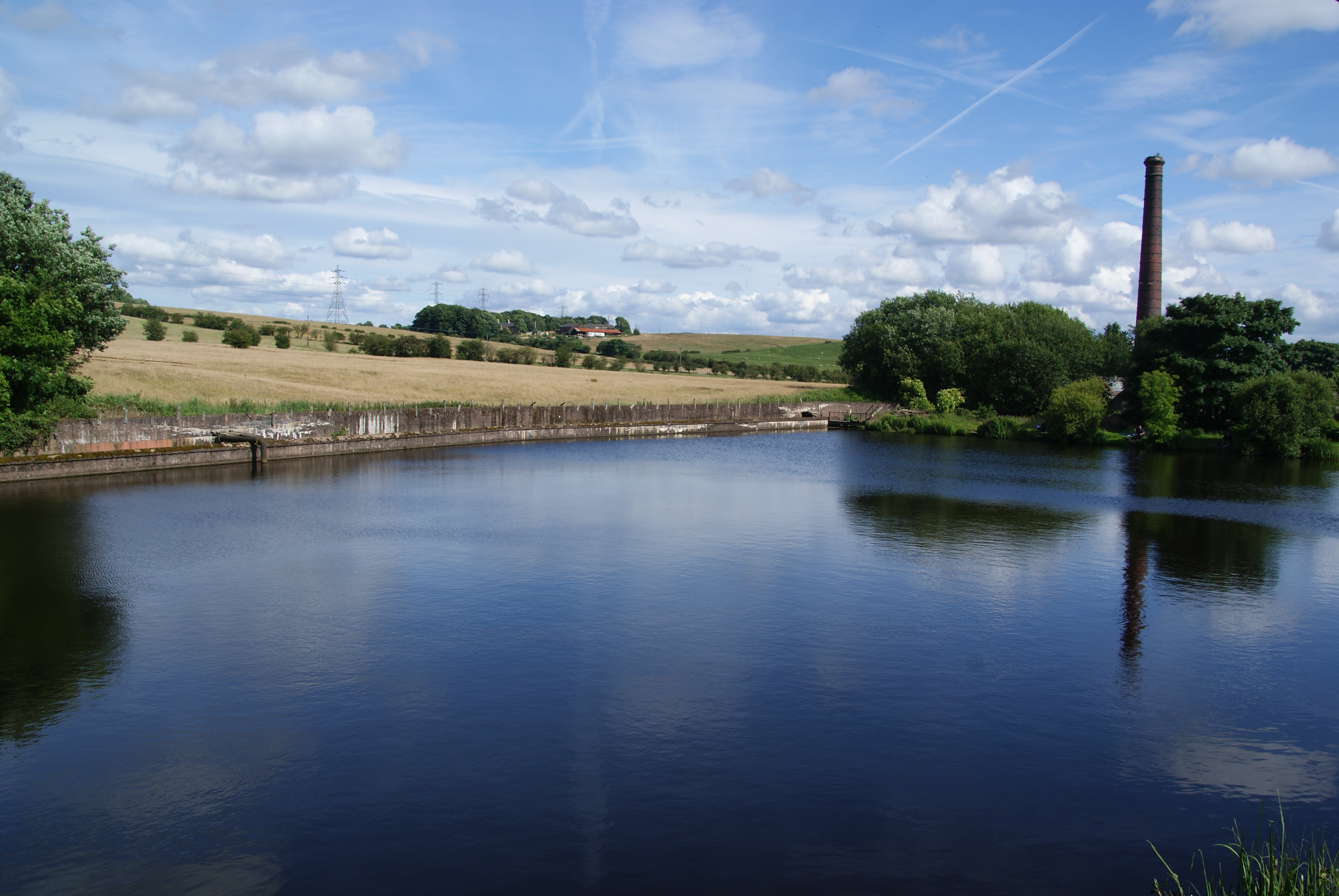
- Mill reservoir at Breightmet by Ainsworth Mill
- Court: House of Lords
- Full case name: John Rylands and Jehu Horrocks v Thomas Fletcher
- Decided: 17 July 1868
- Citation: [1868] UKHL 1, (1868) LR 3 HL 330
- Transcript: Full text of House of Lords decision

Case history
- Prior actions: Court of Assize; Exchequer of Pleas; Court of Exchequer Chamber ([1866] LR 1 Ex 265)

Court membership
- Judges sitting: Lord Cairns, LC; Lord Cranworth

Case opinions
- Lord Cairns, LC; Lord Cranworth

Keywords
- Strict liability, nuisance

Rylands v Fletcher (1868) LR 3 HL 330 is a leading decision by the House of Lords which established a new area of English tort law. It established the rule that one's non-natural use of their land, which leads to another's land being damaged as a result of dangerous things emanating from the land, is strictly liable.

Rylands employed contractors to build a reservoir on his land. As a result of negligent work done, the reservoir burst and flooded a neighbouring mine, run by Fletcher, causing £937 worth of damage (equivalent to £98,500 in 2025). Fletcher initially brought a claim under negligence against Rylands. At the court of first instance, the majority ruled in favour of Rylands. Baron Bramwell, dissenting, argued that the claimant had the right to enjoy his land free of interference from water, and that Rylands was guilty of trespass and the commissioning of a nuisance. Bramwell's argument was affirmed by the Court of Exchequer Chamber and the House of Lords, leading to the development of the "Rule in Rylands v Fletcher".

This doctrine was further developed by English courts, and made an immediate impact on the law. Prior to Rylands, English courts had not based their decisions in similar cases on strict liability, and had focused on the intention behind the actions rather than the nature of the actions themselves. In contrast, Rylands imposed strict liability on those found detrimental in such a fashion without having to prove a duty of care or negligence, which brought the law into line with that relating to public reservoirs and marked a significant doctrinal shift. The rule in Rylands has both been distinguished with and regarded as a species of the tort of private nuisance and even construed as a "liability rule". Unlike ordinary cases of private nuisance, the rule in Rylands requires the escape of a thing that arises from a non-natural use rather than the typical interference emanating from unreasonable use of land. It additionally does not require an act to be continuous, which is typically a requirement for nuisance. Judges and legal scholars, including Chief Justice Charles Doe, Francis Bohlen, and Peter Cane, have criticised the rule both for the economic damage such a doctrine could cause and for its limited applicability.

The tort of Rylands v Fletcher has been disclaimed in various jurisdictions, including Scotland, where it was described as "a heresy that ought to be extirpated", and Australia, where the High Court chose to destroy the doctrine in Burnie Port Authority v General Jones Pty Ltd. Within England and Wales, however, Rylands remains valid law, although the decisions in Cambridge Water Co Ltd v Eastern Counties Leather plc and Transco plc v Stockport Metropolitan Borough Council make it clear that it is no longer an independent tort, but instead a sub-tort of nuisance.

== Facts ==
In 1860, Rylands paid contractors to build a reservoir on his land, intending that it should supply the Ainsworth Mill with water. Rylands played no active role in the construction, instead contracting out to a competent engineer. While building it, the contractors discovered a series of old coal shafts and passages under the land filled loosely with soil and debris, which joined up with Thomas Fletcher's adjoining mine. Rather than blocking these shafts up, the contractors left them. On 11 December 1860, shortly after being filled for the first time, Rylands' reservoir burst and flooded Fletcher's mine, the Red House Colliery, causing £937 worth of damage. Fletcher pumped the water out, but on 17 April 1861 his pump burst, and the mine again began to flood. At this point a mines inspector was brought in, and the sunken coal shafts were discovered. Fletcher brought a claim against Rylands and the landowner, Jehu Horrocks, on 4 November 1861.

== Judgment ==
=== Liverpool Assizes ===
The tort of trespass was inapplicable, as the flooding was deemed not to be "direct and immediate"; the tort of nuisance was rejected as this was a one-off event. The case was first heard by Judge John Mellor and a special jury in September 1862 at the Liverpool Assizes; a court order led to an arbitrator from the Exchequer of Pleas being appointed in December 1864. The arbitrator decided that the contractors were liable for negligence, since they had known about the old mine shafts. Rylands, however, had no way of knowing about the mine shafts and so was not.

=== Exchequer of Pleas ===
The case then went to the Exchequer of Pleas, where it was heard between 3 and 5 May 1865. It was heard on two points: first, whether the defendants were liable for the actions of the contractors and secondly, whether the defendants were liable for the damage regardless of their lack of negligence. They decided for the first point that the defendants were not liable, but were split on the second point. Baron Channell recused. Chief Baron Pollock and Baron Samuel Martin held that the defendants were not liable, as since a negligence claim could not be brought there was no valid case. Baron Bramwell, dissenting, argued that the claimant had the right to enjoy his land free of interference from water, and that as a result the defendant was guilty of trespass and the commissioning of a nuisance. He stated that "the general law, wholly independent of contract" should be that the defendants were liable, "on the plain ground that the defendants have caused water to flow into the [claimant]'s mines, which but for their act would not have gone there..."

=== Court of Exchequer Chamber ===
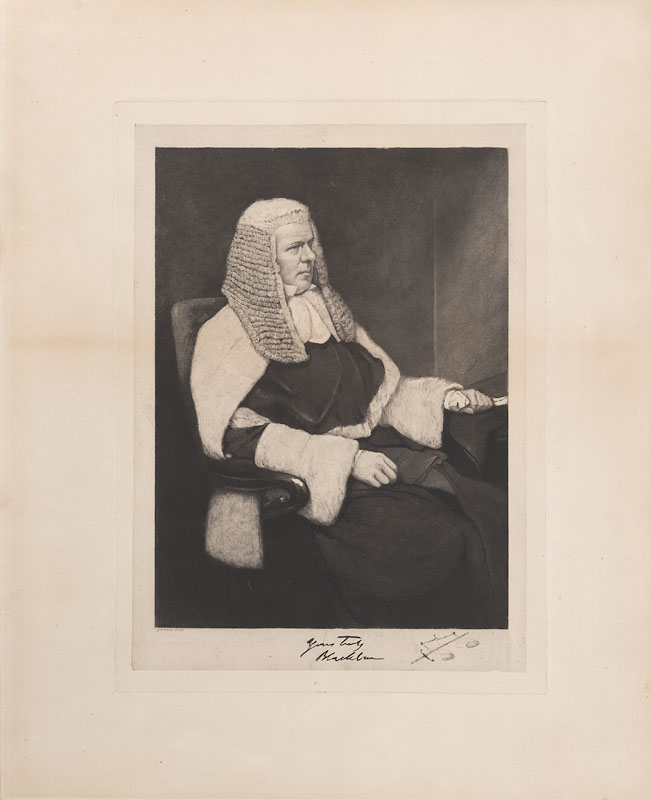
Mr Justice Blackburn gave the leading judgment.

Fletcher appealed to the Exchequer Chamber of six judges. The prior decision was overturned in his favour. Mr Justice Colin Blackburn spoke on behalf of all the judges and said that:

We think that the true rule of law is, that the person who for his own purposes brings on his land and collects and keeps there anything likely to do mischief if it escapes, must keep it at his peril, and, if he does not do so, is prima facie answerable for all the damage which is the natural consequence of its escape. He can excuse himself by showing that the escape was owing to the Plaintiff’s default; or perhaps, that the escape was the consequence of vis major, or the act of God; but as nothing of this sort exists here, it is unnecessary to inquire what excuse would be sufficient. The general rule, as above stated, seems on principle just. The person whose grass or corn is eaten down by the escaping cattle of his neighbour, or whose mine is flooded by the water from his neighbour's reservoir, or whose cellar is invaded by the filth of his neighbour's privy, or whose habitation is made unhealthy by the fumes and noisome vapours of his neighbour's alkali works, is damnified without any fault of his own; and it seems but reasonable and just that the neighbour who has brought something on his own property (which was not naturally there), harmless to others so long as it is confined to his own property, but which he knows will be mischievous if it gets on his neighbour's, should be obliged to make good the damage which ensues if he does not succeed in confining it to his own property. But for his act in bringing it there no mischief could have accrued, and it seems but just that he should at his peril keep it there, so that no mischief may accrue, or answer for the natural and anticipated consequence. And upon authority this we think is established to be the law, whether the things so brought be beasts, or water, or filth, or stenches.

Blackburn's opinion relied on the liability for damages to land available through the tort of chattel trespass and the tort of nuisance, as well as the in scienter action, injury by a domesticated animal known to have a disposition to injure. Rylands appealed.

=== House of Lords ===
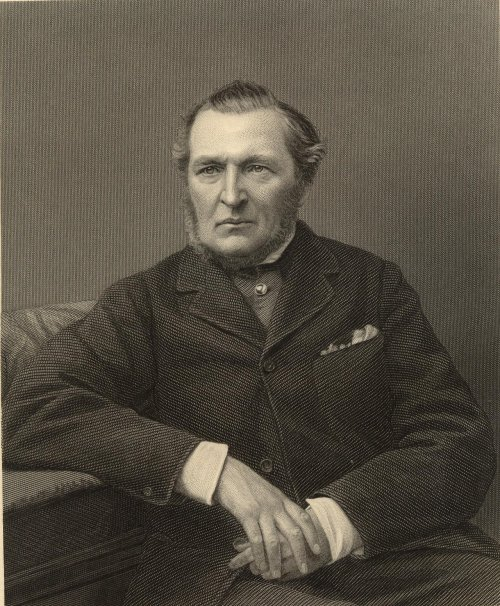
Lord Cairns fully concurred with Mr Justice Blackburn

The House of Lords dismissed the appeal and agreed with the determination for Fletcher. Lord Cairns, in speaking for the House of Lords, stated their agreement of the rule stated above by Mr Justice Blackburn, but added a further limitation on liability, which is that the land from which the escape occurs must have been modified in a way which would be considered non-natural, unusual or inappropriate. The case was then heard by the House of Lords on 6 and 7 July 1868, with a judgment delivered on 17 July. Oddly the court consisted of only two judges, Lord Cairns and Lord Cranworth; Lord Colonsay failed to attend. The eventual judgment confirmed Blackburn's decision and general principle, adding a requirement that the use be "non-natural". The judgment of Lord Cairns was as follows.

My Lords, the principles on which this case must be determined appear to me to be extremely simple. The Defendants, treating them as the owners or occupiers of the close on which the reservoir was constructed, might lawfully have used that close for any purpose for which it might in the ordinary course of the enjoyment of land be used; and if, in what I may term the natural user of that land, there had been any accumulation of water, either on the surface or underground, and if, by the operation of the laws of nature, that accumulation of water had passed off into the close occupied by the Plaintiff, the Plaintiff could not have complained that that result had taken place. If he had desired to guard himself against it, it would have lain upon him to have done so, by leaving, or by interposing, some barrier between his close and the close of the Defendants in order to have prevented that operation of the laws of nature. ...

On the other hand if the Defendants, not stopping at the natural use of their close, had desired to use it for any purpose which I may term a non-natural use, for the purpose of introducing into the close that which in its natural condition was not in or upon it, for the purpose of introducing water either above or below ground in quantities and in a manner not the result of any work or operation on or under the land, – and if in consequence of their doing so, or in consequence of any imperfection in the mode of their doing so, the water came to escape and to pass off into the close of the Plaintiff, then it appears to me that that which the Defendants were doing they were doing at their own peril; and, if in the course of their doing it, the evil arose to which I have referred, the evil, namely, of the escape of the water and its passing away to the close of the Plaintiff and injuring the Plaintiff, then for the consequence of that, in my opinion, the Defendants would be liable. As the case of Smith v. Kenrick is an illustration of the first principle to which I have referred, so also the second principle to which I have referred is well illustrated by another case in the same Court, the case of Baird v Williamson, which was also cited in the argument at the Bar.

== Significance ==
=== Enjoyment of property ===
The 'enjoyment of land' was primary in the reasons of Lord Cairns (above). This foundation stone is a recurring theme in the common law throughout the ages, to wit: "It has been well said, that the use of the law consists, first, in preserving men's persons from death and violence; next, in securing to them the free enjoyment of their property." Tindal, CJ: Charge to the Grand Jury at Bristol on the occasion of the 1832 riots over the rejection in the House of Lords of the Reform Bill.

=== Change to the law ===
Early English common law had, in many instances, imposed liability on those who had caused harm regardless of wrongful intent or negligence. Trespass was considered a remedy for all tortious wrongs, and sometimes used as a synonym for torts generally. Over the centuries, however, judges focused more on the intent and negligence behind the actions than the nature of the actions themselves, leading to the development of negligence and nuisance and the further development of trespass. At the time of Rylands, the previous case relied upon was Vaughan v Menlove, decided in the Court of Common Pleas in 1837. The case had almost identical facts to Rylands, but strict liability was never even considered. The case is instead thought of as one of the best attempts of early 19th century English judges to build up the law of negligence. The outcome of Rylands meant that judges would again impose strict liability on defendants who accumulated dangerous things on their land without any need to prove negligence or wrongful intent. The decision won support for bringing the law relating to private reservoirs up to standard with the law relating to public reservoirs, which contained similar statutory provisions thanks to a pair of private Acts of Parliament passed in 1853 and 1864.

=== Assessment ===
The decision in Rylands initially faced little criticism within England and Wales, although many American scholars and judges of the time felt that judgment was a poor one. Chief Justice Charles Doe of the New Hampshire Supreme Court wrote that it "put a clog upon natural and reasonably necessary uses of matter and tend to embarrass and obstruct much of the work which it seems to be a man's duty carefully to do". The American interpretation was based primarily on the idea that it would cause economic harm. Further American criticism is based on the idea that it is poor law. Firstly, they argue, it is not trespass, since the damage is not direct, and secondly, it is not a nuisance, because there is no continuous action. (Note: Since this criticism was levelled, English courts have made decisions which allow for nuisance claims for one-off events in certain circumstances.) Glofcheski, writing in the Hong Kong Law Journal, notes that "the doctrine has not flourished... a tort imposing strict liability should be closely interpreted and circumspectly applied". It has been argued that the decision was never entirely accepted by the judiciary as a whole, and that it is difficult to justify. This is for two reasons; firstly, it is a case of very limited applicability, and it has been suggested that it be folded into a general principle of strict liability for "ultra-hazardous" activities. Secondly, subsequent case law in England and Wales, particularly in Rickards v Lothian, has undermined the "non-natural use" element by introducing a cost/benefit analysis which severely limits the decision's usefulness.

=== Canada ===
The first article in the 1960 Canadian Bill of Rights states that "the right of the individual to life, liberty, security of the person and enjoyment of property, and the right not to be deprived thereof except by due process of law" is recognised. However it is difficult to adjudicate on this Bill, especially as the provinces have priority over property rights.

A difficulty is encountered with the definition of "property", as remarked by Johansen, which may well be the reason why the matter remains for interpretation by precedent. The 1974 test case for the Bill of Rights, Attorney General of Canada v. Lavell, provided an impetus for the 1982 Charter of Rights, which specifically excludes the "enjoyment of property" for reasons described in the Constitutional history of Canada page. Fridman on Torts in Canada has helpful material.

In Ontario, a common law province, Rylands was upheld by a lower court in Smith v. Inco Ltd. a case alleging that a factory in Port Colborne, Ontario had contaminated adjacent lands with nickel. A subsequent Ontario Court of Appeal ruling in 2010 found that the plaintiff had not provided sufficient evidence of economic harm, raising the legal burden of proof but not invalidating Rylands as precedent law. However, it has been said that the Court of Appeal erred in law in their adjudication over the words "non-natural". In April 2012, the Supreme Court of Canada chose not to hear the appeal.

Mineral rights in the subsurface seem to be preferred over the landowner's rights by the Mineral Tenure Act or the Petroleum and Natural Gas Act in British Columbia (also a common law province) so that recourse to Rylands is quite limited, as case law has developed over liability "to compensate the owner of a surface area for loss or damage caused by the entry, occupation or use of that area" (MTA) and "compensation for nuisance and disturbance from the entry, occupation or use" (PNGA). The compensation for "entry, use and occupation of the Property" seems not to "exceed the entire [taxable] value of the land" as written in the registry. This means in effect that the relocation costs (of, say, a farming operation, or an abode) or emotional damage are likely not payable by the expropriator. Even municipalities cannot exclude miners. The powers of an arbitrator include compensation for land, timber and time, but expressly do not include watershed, health and welfare, or lost cattle. Miners avoid environmental review; the province has no discretion to refuse mineral leases; miners need not notify landowners of transactions; the province can exempt mines from review when mining commences; and landowners do not have rights to refuse to negotiate.

The impact of Rylands v Fletcher in Quebec law, which is based for historical reasons on the civil code, was evaluated by the Supreme Court of Canada in the 1916 case of Vandry et al. v. Quebec Railway, Light, Heat and Power Co. The SCC found that a section in the civil code had ample scope to support the liability of the Quebec Power Co.

The rule in Rylands v Fletcher gives support to Ernst v. EnCana Corporation, 2013 ABQB 537.

=== England and Wales ===
==== Developments ====
The party that can be sued in a Rylands claim is an owner or occupier of land, along with anyone who stores or collects the dangerous material, as in Rainham Chemical Works Ltd v Belvedere Fish Guano Co Ltd. The party suing was initially one with an interest in land, but Perry v Kendricks Transport Ltd confirmed that an interest in land was not necessary to bring a claim. Historically, personal injury claims have been allowed, as in Hale v Jennings. More recent cases, however, such as the House of Lords decision in Transco plc v Stockport Metropolitan Borough Council, have confirmed that Rylands is "a remedy for damage to land or interests in land. It must ... follow that damages for personal injuries are not recoverable under the rule".

In Cambridge Water Lord Goff opined that the rule in Rylands should not further be developed, and that rather than being an independent tort it should be instead considered a sub-tort of nuisance. Statutory provisions, such as the Environmental Protection Act 1990, were a more modern and appropriate way of addressing environmental problems which would previously have been covered by Rylands. Subsequently, Transco disapproved of the Australian decision in Burnie Port Authority v General Jones Pty Ltd to absorb Rylands into the general law of negligence, deciding that Rylands should continue to exist but, as Lord Bingham said, as a "sub-species of nuisance ... while insisting upon its essential nature and purpose; and ... restate it so as to achieve as much certainty and clarity as is attainable". It is now a sub-tort, rather than an independent tort; they have confirmed that it will be allowed to remain.

Donal Nolan has argued that to consider Rylands as part of private nuisance is unsound. Private nuisance requires the claimant to have an interest in land, while Rylands does not; although exceptions to this rule have occasionally been made in private nuisance, in Hunter v Canary Wharf Ltd, the House of Lords ruled that to make exceptions would transform nuisance from a tort against land to a tort against the person, and should not be permitted. John Murphy, Professor of Common Law at the University of Manchester, agrees with Nolan, and makes the additional point that nuisance is focused on a loss of enjoyment to land, not physical damage as Rylands is. It has also been concerned that the reasonable use test, which appears in nuisance, is not applicable to cases brought under Rylands. Roderick Bagshaw similarly criticised the House of Lords for retaining the rule as a sub-species of private nuisance rather than subsuming it into negligence, arguing that excluding recovery for personal injury made it "a more incoherent relic than it was before".

==== Brings, collects and keeps ====
The first requirement under Rylands is that the defendant "for his own purposes brings onto land and collects and keeps there". In Rylands, this was the keeping of water in a reservoir; other cases in England and Wales have illustrated what sort of material is considered. In British Celanese v AH Hunt, the accumulation was of metal foil strips. "For his own purpose" is not understood to be "for his benefit", although that was what Blackburn was referring to at the time; in Smeaton v Ilford Corp, Rylands was held to apply to a local authority accumulating sewage on its land, although there was no benefit to the local authority from doing this.

==== Mischief and escape ====
The next element of Rylands is that the thing be something "likely to do mischief if it escapes". Before Transco plc v Stockport Metropolitan Borough Council this did not have to be a dangerous item (see below); the risk was instead in its behaviour if it escapes. In Rylands the "thing" was water. Other examples are fire, as in Jones v Festiniog Railway, gas, as in Batchellor v Tunbridge Wells Gas Co, fumes, as in West v Bristol Tramways Co, and electricity, as in Hillier v Air Ministry. The extent of the "thing"'s accumulation can also be considered, as in Mason v Levy, where it was not just the type of thing kept but the sheer amount which created the danger. It is essential for a Rylands claim that there be an escape of a dangerous thing "from a place where the defendant has occupation of or control over land to a place which is outside his occupation or control". In Read v J Lyons & Co Ltd, an explosion in a munitions factory killed an inspector on the property. Rylands was held not to apply, because there was no escape. The dangerous thing that escapes does not always have to be the thing which was accumulated, but there must be a causal link. In Miles v Forest Rock Granite Co (Leicestershire) Ltd, explosives stored on the defendant's land led to the escape of rocks in a blast, and the defendant was found liable.

In Transco plc v Stockport Metropolitan Borough Council, Lord Bingham stated obiter that "I do not think the mischief or danger test should be at all easily satisfied. It must be shown that the defendant has done something which he recognised, or judged by the standards appropriate at the relevant place and time, he ought reasonably to have recognised, as giving rise to an exceptionally high risk of danger or mischief if there should be an escape, however unlikely an escape may have been thought to be."

==== Non-natural use ====
The requirement of "non-natural use", which was created when the case went to the House of Lords, was described by Lord Moulton, in Rickards v Lothian, as "some special use bringing with it increased danger to others". Because the idea of something being "non-natural" is a subjective one, the interpretation of this principle has varied over the years. In Musgrove v Pandelis, a car filled with petrol was considered "non-natural", while in Rainham Chemical Works Ltd v Belvedere Fish Guano Co Ltd, so was the operation of a munitions factory during war-time. There is no single concrete test to define what is "non-natural", for reasons given by Lord Bingham in Transco plc v Stockport Metropolitan Borough Council; "[non-natural use] is not a test to be inflexibly applied: a use may be extraordinary and unusual at one time or in one place but not so at another time or in another place ... I also doubt whether a test of reasonable user is helpful, since a user may well be quite out of the ordinary but not unreasonable".

==== Defences ====
There are several defences in England and Wales to a claim under Rylands v Fletcher; act of an unknown third party, contributory negligence, consent, and statutory authority. An act of an unknown third party will absolve the defendant of liability, as in Perry v Kendricks Transport Ltd. In Northwestern Utilities Ltd v London Guarantee and Accident Co Ltd, the principle was established that if a claimant knows of the unknown third party and their actions, the defendant is additionally likely to be able to deny liability. As Rylands requires strict liability, any contributory negligence voids most of the claim. Initially it was sufficient to offset the case itself; with the Law Reform (Contributory Negligence) Act 1945, courts instead apportion damages, taking into account how much of the harm was contributed by the claimant. Nevertheless, contributory negligence is still a viable partial defence to a Rylands claim. Other valid defences are where the claimant has consented, expressly or impliedly, to the accumulation of the "thing", and where there is statutory authority for the accumulation.

=== Scotland ===
The principles of Rylands v Fletcher were initially applied in Scots law, first in the case of Mackintosh v Mackintosh, where a fire spreading from the defendant's land to the claimant's land caused property damage. Scots lawyers and judges applied Rylands differently from their English counterparts, however. While the rule is interpreted in England and Wales as being distinct from negligence and the rules of duty of care and liability applied there, the principle in Scotland was that "negligence is still the ground of liability. The only difference is that in such cases the proprietor is doing something upon his property which is in its nature dangerous and not necessary (or usual?) in the ordinary management of the particular kind of property, and he is therefore bound to observe a higher degree of diligence to prevent injury to his neighbour". The use of Rylands in Scots law, which was started in Mackintosh, finally came to an end in RHM Bakeries v Strathclyde Regional Council. Lord Fraser, as part of his judgment, stated that the idea of strict liability that was brought into play by Rylands was not a part of Scots law, and the idea that it ever had been valid was "a heresy that ought to be extirpated".

=== United States ===
Within the United States, there are many situations in which strict liability is applied to actions, and Rylands is commonly cited as the origin of that rule (particularly where strict liability is based on the defendant's "ultrahazardous activity"); it was first applied in Ball v. Nye, by the Supreme Judicial Court of Massachusetts. The Supreme Court of Minnesota also adopted it in Cahill v. Eastman, while the highest courts of New York, New Hampshire and New Jersey all rejected the principle, in Losee v. Buchanan, Brown v. Collins, and Marshall v. Welwood respectively. The Supreme Court of New Jersey, however, reversed Welwood in 1983 in Department of Environmental Protection v. Ventron Corp. Many courts in the United States have attempted to use Rylands to justify absolute liability, which it was never intended to do; while absolute liability is where no defence is applicable, in Rylands itself Lord Cairns accepted that there were some situations where the case should not be applied.

=== Australia ===
In Australia, the principles of Rylands v Fletcher were "killed off" by the High Court of Australia in Burnie Port Authority v General Jones Pty Ltd. The High Court's view was that the Rylands principles "should now been seen ... as absorbed by the principles of ordinary negligence, and not as an independent principle of strict liability". Contrasting this, the principles have escaped destruction in Hong Kong, where the courts are yet to follow the examples set by Australia and England and Wales, and Rylands remains an independent tort.

=== India ===
The rule of strict liability famously laid down by Blackburn, in Rylands v. Fletcher, proved to be rather ineffective with the passage of time to counter the dangerous use of one's property or an industry that produced substances or wastes detrimental to public health. The pre-requirements essential for establishing a liability under the principle of strict liability viz., the non-natural use of land, use of a dangerous thing, and the element of escape provided substantial loopholes to the enterprises to escape liability under the Rylands v. Fletcher rule. Moreover, the exceptions provided within the rule (and restated by the Supreme Court of India in MC Mehta v. Union of India) afford ample opportunity to the commercial enterprises to escape liability.

The Supreme Court of India in MC Mehta v. Union of India evolved a more stringent rule of strict liability than the Rylands v. Fletcher rule. In this case, which involved the leakage of and the harm caused by Oleum gas from one of the units of Shriram industries in Delhi, the court held that keeping in mind the needs and demands of a modern society with highly advanced scientific knowledge and technology where for the sake of development programme, it was necessary to carry out inherently dangerous or hazardous industry, a new rule had to be laid down to adequately deal with the problems arising in a highly industrialised economy. This new rule had to be based on the English rule of strict liability, but had to be even more stringent, as a result of which no firm carrying out an inherently dangerous or hazardous activity might escape from liability, irrespective of whether there was any negligence involved on the part of the firm or not.

The court also pointed out that the duty owed by such an enterprise to the society is “absolute and non-delegable” and that the enterprise cannot escape liability by showing that it had taken all reasonable care and there was no negligence on its part. The bases of the new rule as indicated by the Supreme Court are two:

1. If an enterprise is permitted to carry on any hazardous or inherently dangerous activity for its profit, the law must presume that such permission is conditional on the enterprise absorbing the cost of any accident (including indemnification of all those who suffer harm in the accident) arising on account of such hazardous or inherently dangerous activity as an appropriate item of its overheads; and
2. The enterprise alone has the resource to discover and guard against hazards or danger and to provide warning against potential hazards.

The rule in Rylands v. Fletcher requires non-natural use of land by the defendant and escape of the thing from his land, which causes damage. But the rule in MC Mehta v. Union of India is not dependent upon any such condition. The necessary requirements for applicability of the new rule of absolute liability are that the defendant is engaged in hazardous or inherently dangerous activity and that harm results to anyone on account of an accident in the operation of such hazardous or inherently dangerous activity.

The rule in Rylands v. Fletcher will not cover cases of harm to persons within the premises where the inherently dangerous activity is carried out, for the rule requires escape of the thing which causes harm from the premises. The new rule makes no distinction between the persons within the premises where the enterprise is operating and persons outside the premises because escape of the thing causing harm from the premises is not a necessary condition for the applicability of the rule. Further, the rule in Rylands v. Fletcher, though strict in the sense that it is not dependent on any negligence on the part of the defendant and in this respect similar to the new rule, is not absolute as it is subject to many exceptions but the new rule in Mehta's case is not only strict but absolute and is subject to no exception.

Another important point of distinction between the two rules is in the matter of award of damages. Damages awardable where the rule in Rylands v. Fletcher applies will be ordinary or compensatory; but in cases where the rule applicable is the one laid down in MC Mehta's case the court can allow exemplary damages, and the bigger and more prosperous the enterprise, the greater can be the amount of compensation payable by it. A small bump in the road was encountered in Charan Lal Sahu v. Union of India and doubts were expressed as to the quantum of damages payable. But the Supreme Court set all doubts aside in another landmark decision in the case of Indian Council for Enviro-Legal Action v. Union of India where, it was held that the rule laid down in Mehta's case was not obiter and was appropriate and suited to the conditions prevailing in the country.

== See also ==
- English tort law
- US tort law
- Strict liability
