= Smith v. Inco Ltd. =

Smith v. Inco Ltd. [2010] ONSC 3790 was a class-action lawsuit in Canada. The defendant, Inco Ltd. (also known as Vale Canada Limited), was sued by plaintiff Ellen Smith for damages relating to high nickel concentrations in the soil in Port Colborne, Canada. The contamination came from an Inco Ltd. refinery that was in commission between 1918-1984 .

This class action lawsuit initially started in 2002, but did not go to trial until 2010. The plaintiff's counsel initially brought up health concerns related to nickel concentrations that had seeped into the soil of homeowners in Port Colborne. However, a lack of evidence shifted this case to be limited to a claim that nickel concentrations reduced the value of 7,000 homes near the refinery.

== Damages ==
The plaintiffs, (i.e. approximately 7,000 homeowners in Port Colborne) were awarded $36 million due to the refinery emitting nickel oxide particulates into the air, which had fallen into their yards.

== 2011 appeal by Inco. Ltd. ==
The decision in Smith v. Inco Ltd. [2010] ONSC 3790 was reversed on appeal by Inco Limited.
