= Burnie Port Authority v General Jones Pty Ltd =

Judgement of the High Court of Australia

- Court: High Court of Australia
- Decided: 24 March 1994
- Citations: [1994] HCA 13, (1994) 179 CLR 520

Case history
- Prior actions: [1991] TASRp 15, [1991] Tas R 203
- Appealed from: Supreme Court (Tas) (Full Court)

Court membership
- Judges sitting: Mason CJ, Brennan, Deane, Dawson, Toohey, Gaudron & McHugh JJ

Case opinions
- (5:2) Authority liable to General Jones under ordinary principles of negligence; appeal dismissed. (per Mason CJ, Deane, Dawson, Toohey, Gaudron JJ)

Burnie Port Authority v General Jones Pty Ltd is a tort law case from the High Court of Australia, which decided it would abolish the rule in Rylands v Fletcher, and the ignis suus principle, incorporating them generally into the tort of negligence.

== Background ==
=== Facts ===
A fire, caused by an independent contractor's employee welding negligently, began on the defendant's premises and spread to a nearby property. The property was burnt causing A$2.5M of damages. The plaintiff sued under ignis suus, nuisance, negligence and the rule in Rylands v Fletcher (a rule of strict liability), interpreted in part through the duty of occupier to invitee.

The defendant was Burnie Port Authority (Burnie), located in Burnie, Tasmania, who provided storage facilities, and the plaintiff was General Jones, who stored a large quantity of frozen vegetables. General Jones suffered damage when the vegetables were ruined by fire which destroyed Burnie property.

=== Prior proceedings ===
- Supreme Court of Tasmania: found for the plaintiff against the defendant on the grounds of the ignis suus rule. Other defendants were the contracting firm who did the welding as part of expanding coolroom capacity, and the manufacturers of Isolite, the highly flammable insulating material, which was set alight by welding sparks, and which produces noxious gases.
- Defendant appealed to the full court of the Supreme Court of Tasmania: found for the plaintiff on the basis of the Rylands v Fletcher principle. The grounds of nuisance and negligence were not appealed.
- Appealed to the High Court of Australia.

== High Court Judgment ==
The High Court held that Rylands involved "quite unacceptable uncertainty". It said that Blackburn J's formulation had been "all but obliterated by subsequent judicial explanations and qualifications". At the time of Rylands, negligence liability was limited to "a miscellany of disparate categories of cases", and only with Heaven v Pender and Donoghue v Stevenson was liability grounded on general foreseeability. The justices therefore felt that the rule should be done away with and so the independent contractor was not liable under that, but could only be culpable in the law of negligence.

HCA held: The appeal by Burnie was dismissed. Burnie, by allowing its contractor to introduce dangerous substances and activities on site, owed a duty of care to Jones to take reasonable steps to prevent fire, and the breach created liability under the normal rules of negligence. The joint judgment stated "The rule in Rylands v Fletcher, with all its difficulties, uncertainties, qualifications, and exceptions, should now be seen ... as absorbed by the rules of ordinary negligence. Under those principles, a person who takes advantage of his or her control of premises to introduce a dangerous substance, to carry on a dangerous activity, or to allow another to do one of those things, owes a duty of reasonable care to avoid a reasonably foreseeble risk of injury or damage to the person or the property of another."

The ignis suus (his or her fire) rule was held to be ancient common law that was modified by statute in the UK, but never became law in Australia.

Damages in the tort of nuisance were not pleaded in the HCA.

== See also ==
- Transco plc v Stockport MBC
