= Transco plc v Stockport Metropolitan BC =

English law case about the tort of nusiance

Transco plc v Stockport Metropolitan Borough Council
- Full case name: Transco plc v Stockport Metropolitan Borough Council
- Citation: [2003] UKHL 61
- Transcript: BAILII

Transco plc v Stockport Metropolitan Borough Council [2003] UKHL 61 is an important English tort law case, concerning the rule in Rylands v. Fletcher.

== Facts ==
Transco plc (British Gas come commercial) had sued the council for repairs of £93,681.55 underneath one of its pipes in Brinnington. The ground beneath the gas pipe had washed away when the council’s water pipe leaked.

== Judgment ==
The House of Lords held that because the quantities of water from an ordinary pipe is not dangerous or unnatural in the course of things, the council was not liable. Lord Hoffmann, however, remarked on the irony that had the pipe belonged to a ‘water undertaker’ s.209 Water Industry Act 1991 creates strict liability unless (with further irony) the loss is to a Gas Act 1986 company.

Their Lordships protected the rule in Rylands v. Fletcher but within strict confines. The escape must be of something dangerous, out of the ordinary, which did not include a burst waterpipe on council property. Unlike the Australian High Court, whose abolition of the doctrine in Burnie Port Authority v. General Jones Pty (1994) 179 CLR 520 was given severe doubt, their Lordships stated their purpose,

to retain the rule, while insisting upon its essential nature and purpose; and to restate it so as to achieve as much certainty and clarity as is attainable, recognising that new factual situations are bound to arise posing difficult questions on the boundary of the rule, wherever that is drawn.

== See also ==
- English tort law
- Act of God
