= Strict liability =

Responsibility for consequences from activity despite absence of fault or criminal intent

In criminal and civil law, strict liability is a standard of liability under which a person is legally responsible for the consequences flowing from an activity even in the absence of fault or criminal intent on the part of the defendant.

Under the strict liability law, if the defendant possesses anything that is inherently dangerous, as specified under the "ultrahazardous" definition, the defendant is then strictly liable for any damages caused by such possession, no matter how carefully the defendant is safeguarding them.

In the field of torts, prominent examples of strict liability may include product liability, abnormally dangerous activities (e.g., blasting), intrusion onto another's land by livestock, and ownership of wild animals.

Other than activities specified above (like ownership of wild animals, etc), US courts have historically considered the following activities as "ultrahazardous":

1. storing flammable liquids in quantity in an urban area
2. pile driving
3. blasting
4. crop dusting
5. fumigation with cyanide gas
6. emission of noxious fumes by a manufacturing plant located in a settled area
7. locating oil wells or refineries in populated communities
8. test firing solid-fuel rocket motors.

On the other hand, US courts typically rule the following activities as not "ultrahazardous": parachuting, drunk driving, maintaining power lines, and letting water escape from an irrigation ditch.

In the English system, in reality, responsibility is tailored to the evidentiary system: that is, to the admissibility of defenses and excuses capable of neutralizing the punishability of the actus reus; and therefore the different forms of strict liability can be differentiated according to the defenses allowed by the individual legal systems.

== Tort law ==
In tort law, strict liability is the imposition of liability on a party without a finding of fault (such as negligence or tortious intent). The claimant need only prove that the tort occurred and that the defendant was responsible. The law imputes strict liability to situations it considers to be inherently dangerous. It discourages reckless behaviour and needless loss by forcing potential defendants to take every possible precaution. It has the beneficial effect of simplifying and thereby expediting court decisions in these cases, although the application of strict liability may seem unfair or harsh, as in Re Polemis.

Under the English law of negligence and nuisance, even where tortious liability is strict, the defendant may sometimes be liable only for the reasonably foreseeable consequences of his act or omission.

An early example of strict liability is the rule Rylands v Fletcher, where it was held that "any person who for his own purposes brings on his lands and collects and keeps there anything likely to do mischief if it escapes, must keep it in at his peril, and, if he does not do so, is prima facie answerable for all the damage which is the natural consequence of its escape". If the owner of a zoo keeps lions and tigers, he is liable if the big cats escape and cause damage or injury.

In strict liability situations, although the plaintiff does not have to prove fault, the defendant can raise a defense of absence of fault, especially in cases of product liability, where the defense may argue that the defect was the result of the plaintiff's actions and not of the product, that is, no inference of defect should be drawn solely because an accident occurs. If the plaintiff can prove that the defendant knew about the defect before the damages occurred, additional punitive damages can be awarded to the victim in some jurisdictions.

The doctrine's most famous advocates were Learned Hand, Benjamin Cardozo, and Roger J. Traynor.

Strict liability is sometimes distinguished from absolute liability. In this context, an actus reus may be excused from strict liability if due diligence is proved. Absolute liability, however, requires only an actus reus.

=== Vaccines ===
In the United States courts have applied strict liability to vaccines since the Cutter incident in 1955. Some vaccines (e.g. for Lyme disease) have been removed from the market because of unacceptable liability risk to the manufacturer.

The National Childhood Vaccine Injury Act (NCVIA) was enacted in 1986 to make an exception for childhood vaccines that are required for public school attendance. The NCVIA created a no-fault compensation scheme to stabilize a vaccine market adversely affected by an increase in vaccine-related lawsuits, and to facilitate compensation to claimants who found pursuing legitimate vaccine-inflicted injuries too difficult and cost prohibitive.

=== Bicycle–motor vehicle collisions ===
A form of strict liability has been supported in law in the Netherlands since the early 1990s for bicycle-motor vehicle collisions. In a nutshell, this means that, in a collision between a car and a cyclist, the driver is deemed to be liable to pay damages and his insurer (motor vehicle insurance is mandatory in the Netherlands, while cyclist insurance is not) must pay the full damages, as long as 1) the collision was unintentional (i.e. neither party, motorist or cyclist, intentionally crashed into the other), and 2) the cyclist was not in error in some way. Even if a cyclist made an error, as long as the collision was still unintentional, the motorist's insurance must still pay half of the damages. This does not apply if the cyclist is under 14 years of age, in which case the motorist must pay full damages. If it can be proved that a cyclist intended to collide with the car, then the cyclist must pay the damages (or their parents in the case of a minor).

=== General aviation ===
The trend toward strict liability in the United States during the mid to late 20th century nearly destroyed the small aircraft industry by the mid 1990s. Production had dropped from a peak of 18,000 units per year in 1978 to under only a few hundred by 1993. With a concurrent increase in the cost of liability insurance per airplane rising from $50 in 1962 to $100,000 in 1988, and many underwriters had begun to refuse all new policies.

== Criminal law ==
The concept of strict liability is also found in criminal law. Strict liability often applies to vehicular traffic offenses: in a speeding case, for example, whether the defendant knew that the posted speed limit was being exceeded is irrelevant; the prosecutor need only prove that the defendant was driving the vehicle in excess of the posted speed limit.

In the United States, strict liability can be determined by looking at the intent of the legislature. If the legislature seems to have purposefully left out a mental state element (mens rea) because they felt mental state need not be proven, it is treated as a strict liability. However, when a statute is silent as to the mental state (mens rea) and it is not clear that the legislature purposely left it out, the ordinary presumption is that a mental state is required for criminal liability. When no mens rea is specified, under the Model Penal Code (MPC), the default mens rea requirement is recklessness, which the MPC defines as "when a person consciously disregards a substantial and unjustifiable risk with respect to a material element".

Strict liability laws can also prevent defendants from raising diminished mental capacity defenses, since intent does not need to be proven.

In the English case of Sweet v Parsley (1970), it was held that where a statute creating a crime made no reference to intention, then mens rea would be imputed by the court, so that the crime would not be one of strict liability.

== See also ==
- Command responsibility
- Due diligence
- Public liability
- Restatement of Torts, Second
- Vicarious liability
