= Criminal law of the United States =

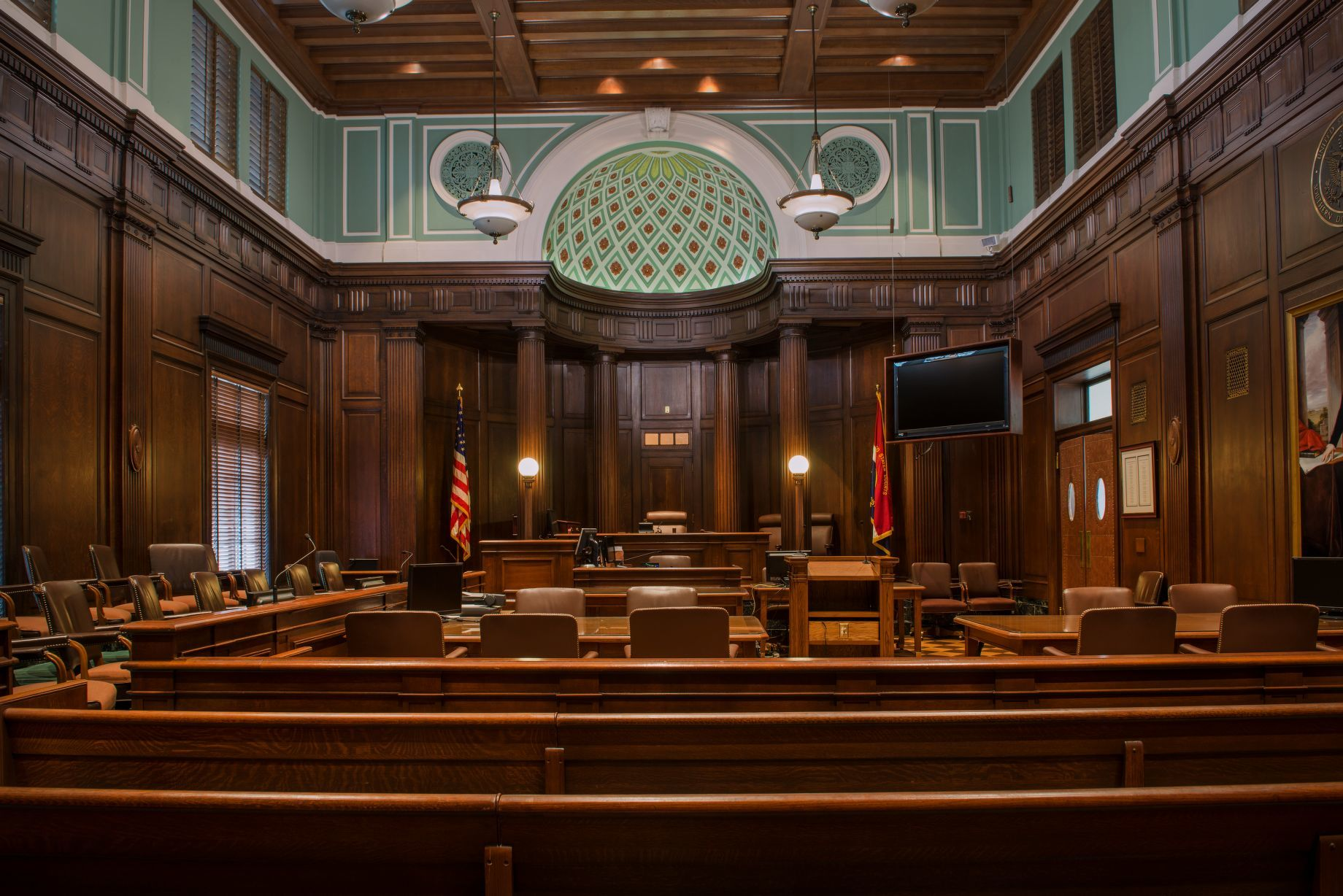
The courtroom of the United States Courthouse in Augusta, Georgia

The criminal law of the United States is a manifold system of laws and practices that connects crimes and consequences. In comparison, civil law addresses non-criminal disputes. The system varies considerably by jurisdiction, but conforms to the US Constitution. Generally there are two systems of criminal law to which a person maybe subject; the most frequent is state criminal law, and the other is federal law.

The American Model Penal Code defines the purpose of criminal law as: to prevent any conduct that cause or may cause harm to people or society, to enact public order, to define what acts are criminal, to inform the public what acts constitute crimes, and to distinguish a minor from a serious offense.

== Definitions ==
A crime has three parts: the act (actus reus), the intent, and the concurrence of the two. Generally, crimes can be divided into categories: crime against a person, crime against property, sexual crimes, public morality, crimes against the state, and inchoate crimes.

=== Degrees ===
Many crimes address the severity of a criminal act by specifying the degree of an offense. First degree crimes are more serious than those in the second or third degree. For example, murder in the first degree is a greater offense than murder in the second.

=== Parties ===
The parties to a crime can be principals or accessories. A principal is a person directly involved in a crime. The two types of principals are:

- Principal in the first degree: the person who commits the crime.
- Principal in the second degree (accomplice): someone who aids, counsels, assists, or encourages the first-degree principal.

Presence is required for a party to be considered a principal in the second degree, with constructive presence considered sufficient. Both principals are punished equally and are equally liable for the crime. Presence is not sufficient to impose liability; the party must take an affirmative action. A party must also have the requisite intent and must have a criminal state of mind to be convicted.

An accessory is a person who helps commit the crime without presence. Accessories are generally punished less severely than the principal. The two types of accessories are:

- An accessory before the fact is a person who encourages or helps another commit a crime. Statutes group principals with these accessories and punish them together.
- An accessory after the fact is a person who learns of a crime and helps to conceal it or the perpetrator by providing aid, comfort, or shelter to help the principal avoid arrest or prosecution after the crime. An accessory after the fact must be aware of the criminal's status and intend to hinder the arrest.

== Sources of law ==
All levels of government rely on the following:

=== Common law ===
Common law is law developed by judges through legal opinions, as opposed to statutes adopted through the legislative process or regulations issued by the executive branch. A common law crime is thus a crime that was originally defined by judges.

Common law no longer applies to federal crimes because of the U.S. Supreme Court's decision in United States v. Hudson and Goodwin, 11 U.S. 32 (1812). The acceptance of common law crimes varies at the state level. These states expressly retain a role for common law crimes: Alabama, Connecticut, the District of Columbia, Florida, Idaho, Maryland, Michigan, Mississippi, New Mexico, North Carolina, North Dakota, Rhode Island, South Carolina, Virginia, and Washington. All recognize the common law authority of judges to convict for conduct not criminalized by statute.

=== Statutes ===
The federal government, the 50 states, the District of Columbia, and US territories such as Puerto Rico have their own penal codes. Statutes derive from the common law. For example, if a state's murder statute does not define "human being," its courts rely on the common-law definition.

==== State vs. federal ====
States possess the police power, the most general power to pass criminal laws. The federal government can only exercise those powers granted to it by the Constitution, limiting federal laws to the powers granted to Congress. For example, drug crimes, which comprise a large percentage of federal criminal cases, are subject to federal control because drugs are a commodity traded across state lines, thus making controlled substances subject to regulation by Congress in the Controlled Substances Act, which relies on the Commerce Clause. Gonzales v. Raich affirmed Congress's power to regulate drug possession.

=== Model Penal Code ===
The Model Penal Code ("MPC") was created by the American Law Institute ("ALI") in 1962. In other areas of law, the ALI created Restatements of Law, usually referred to as Restatements. Examples are Restatement of Contracts and Restatement of Torts. The MPC is their equivalent for criminal law.

Many states have wholly or largely adopted the MPC. Others have implemented it in part, and still others have not adopted any portion of it. However, even in jurisdictions where it has not been adopted, the MPC is often cited as persuasive authority in the same way that Restatements are in other areas of law.

== Principle of legality ==
An overarching concept in American criminal law is that people may not be punished for committing merely immoral or unethical acts. They can only be punished for acts declared beforehand as a crime.

== Burden of proof ==
In the United States, the adversarial system is used. The prosecution must prove each element of the alleged crime beyond a reasonable doubt for conviction. Corpus delicti is also required, the principle that a crime must be proved to have occurred before a person can be convicted of committing that crime; confession is not enough to prove that a crime has occurred.

== Elements ==
Crimes can generally be reduced to actus reus elements and mens rea elements. Actus reus elements are elements that describe conduct. Mens rea elements are elements that identify a particular mental state.

=== Actus reus ===
In criminal law, actus reus (/ˈæktəs ˈreɪəs/ ; pl.: actus rei), Latin for "guilty act", is one of the elements normally required to prove commission of a crime in common law jurisdictions, the other being Latin: mens rea ("guilty mind"). The actus reus refers to the physical action or omission required to establish liability, as opposed to the intent. In the United States, it is sometimes called the external element or the objective element of a crime.

=== Res gestae ===
Res gestae (Latin for 'things done') is a term found in substantive and procedural American jurisprudence and English law. In American substantive law, it refers to the period of a felony from start-to-end. In American procedural law, it refers to a former exception to the hearsay rule for statements made spontaneously or as part of an act. The English and Canadian version of res gestae is similar, but is still recognized as a traditional exception to the hearsay rule.

=== Animus furandi ===
The phrase animus furandi is typically translated as "evil in the heart" or "the intention to steal". This intent is usually associated with permanence. For example, a person who takes an object unlawfully with the intent of returning it later does not have animus furandi. However, a person who takes an object with the intent of possessing it permanently does.

==== Voluntary act ====
The Voluntary Act Requirement (VAR) is a predicate that prevents those convicted from being punished for involuntary conduct that may be linked to crime. Accordingly, justifying a conviction requires an action to be (a) willingly taken, (b) necessary for a crime's occurrence, and (c) able to be attributed beyond doubt to voluntary efforts. Ordinarily, a voluntary act refers to commission. However, as discussed below, some laws punish failure to act. A status is not a voluntary act. For example, no law is constitutional that makes it a crime to be addicted to illegal drugs, as opposed to using them, as demonstrated in Robinson v. California.

===== Omission =====
Failure to act can occasionally be criminal, such as, not paying taxes or Criminal dereliction of duty. Typically, the criminality of failing to act is codified.

Certain relationships create a duty to act under common law, such as spouse to spouse, parent to child, or employer to employee, for example. A person may contract to act, such as a babysitter to render aid in the event of the child in their care hurting himself.

A person typically has a duty to act when he is responsible for putting another in peril, such as through accidental injury.

====== Creation of reliance ======
A person may have a legal duty to continue after beginning to act. This situation typically arises in for example, a possible drowning. One bystander among many starts swimming out to rescue him, but turns around halfway and returns to shore alone. The rationale for holding the bystander culpable is that other bystanders relied on that action. If the bystander had been the only person present, no such culpability is established.

=== Social harm ===
Criminal law is distinguishable from tort law or contract law, for example, in that society as a whole is theoretically damaged. Beyond the particular victims, society as a whole is responsible for the case and in the event of a conviction, carrying out a sentence. Social harm is that part of the crime to be avoided.

=== Mens rea ===
The phrase mens rea is typically translated as "guilty mind" and describes the expected mental state of an accused.

General intent is an awareness of factors constituting the crime, including attendant circumstances. The criminal must be aware of committing an illegal act and that attendant circumstances are likely to occur. The requisite intent may be inferred from the performance of the act.

A specific intent crime requires the doing of an act coupled with specific intent or objective. Specific intent cannot be inferred from the act. The major specific intent crimes are:

- conspiracy (intent to have crime completed),
- attempt (intent to complete a crime – whether specific or not, but falling short in completing the crime),
- solicitation (intent to have another person commit a crime),
- embezzlement (intent to defraud),
- first degree premeditated murder (premeditation),
- false pretenses (intent to defraud),
- forgery (intent to defraud),
- larceny & robbery (intent to permanently deprive other of interest in property taken),
- assault (intent to commit battery) and
- burglary (intent to commit felony in dwelling).

A strict liability crime, however, does not require that mens rea be found. Common strict liability crimes include statutory rape and sale of alcohol to minors.

The MPC addresses intent. One of its major innovations is the use of standardized mens rea terms (in MPC terms, culpability) to determine levels of mental states, just as homicide is considered more severe if done intentionally rather than accidentally. These terms are (in descending order) "purposely", "knowingly," "recklessly", "negligently", and "strict liability". Each material element of every crime has an associated culpability state that the prosecution must prove beyond a reasonable doubt.

=== Causation ===
To determine causation, the result of an action must be foreseeable and must be a substantial factor in the crime.

The actual cause principle (also called "cause-in-fact") holds that the defendant cannot be criminally liable unless it can be shown that he was the cause-in-fact of the prohibited result. Actual cause is satisfied if the result would not have happened in the absence of defendant's conduct. To find a defendant guilty, a court must use the following test:

- but-for test, where but for the defendant's conduct the result would not have occurred.
- substantial factor test, if there are multiple causes for a crime the defendant's conduct must be a substantial factor in causing the harm.

Exceptions to the but-for test include a case where multiple wrongdoers "overdetermine" the harm that a victim would have experienced. An act that hastens or accelerates a harmful consequence can create criminal liability.

The proximate cause principle (also called "legal" cause) restricts criminal liability to those cases where a harmful result was a foreseeable result of an act. It is often phrased that the harmful result must be the "natural or probable" consequence of the act. If the result is unusual, abnormal, or unlikely, no liability attaches.

Transfer intent maintains that an act remains liable when a victim other than the intended one experiences the harm.

=== Concurrence of actus reus and mens rea ===
Concurrence occurs when an act reflects mens rea and actus reus. For example, X goes on a hill overlooking the field that Y is playing on, intentionally dislodges a large boulder, and directs it towards Y intending to kill Y. If it kills Y, concurrence is established. However, if the dislodged boulder gets stuck in a tree, and X gives up, no crime attaches. However, if later the boulder becomes dislodged in any way other than X dislodging it with the intention of killing Y and then it kills Y, no concurrence is established, and X committed no crime.

== Affirmative defenses ==
The two categories of affirmative defense are: justification and excuse. Justifications differ from excuses in that a successful justification shows that defendant's conduct was not wrong, whereas a successful excuse does not show the defendant's conduct was wrong. A successful excuse shows that, while the defendant's conduct was regrettable, this defendant is not subject to punishment.

=== Justification ===
Justification defenses are full defenses. Society essentially tells the actor that he did nothing wrong under the circumstances.

==== Self-defense or defense of others ====
This defense is used to discount a crime of battery or homicide. Under common law, a person may use non-deadly force to self-defend from a non-deadly attack under certain circumstances. The defendant must not be the aggressor and must believe force is necessary. Such a belief must also be reasonable.

In addition, the person must be facing imminent and unlawful force. Notably, force need not be actually necessary. It need only appear so to a reasonable person.

Under common law, a person may use deadly force to defend against a deadly attack unless non-deadly force would suffice. Some jurisdictions establish a duty to retreat before using deadly force. In such jurisdictions, a non-aggressor has the duty to retreat from a threatening situation if this can be done with complete safety.

==== Other justifications ====
Other justifications include defense of others, acts by law enforcement officials, fear of imminent harm, and necessity.

Defense of property is a defense where defendant uses reasonable and appropriate force to avoid danger and prevent the threatened damage/interference with property, but not deadly force.

Entrapment is a defense where the defendant must show that a lack of predisposition and that a law enforcement agent induced the crime. Predisposition indicates a defendant's readiness to commit the crime and focuses on defendant's conduct. Inducement is the encouragement that might persuade a defendant to commit a crime. This focuses on the conduct of the law enforcement agent.

Abandonment is used as a defense where a defendant voluntarily abandons the attempt before committing the act.

Impossibility defense implies that a criminal attempt fails because the act is impossible. The two types of impossibility defenses are:

- Factual impossibility where a factual error prevents commission of the crime.
- Legal impossibility where the defendant completed all the intended acts, but those acts fail to complete the required elements for the crime.

=== Excuse ===
Excuse defenses can be fully exonerating. Intoxication can serve as such a defense, with the law distinguishing between how voluntary and involuntary intoxication can serve as defenses. Other excuses include duress and insanity. Infancy is a defense where the defendant is a minor and too young to form criminal intent.

==== Intoxication ====
Voluntary intoxication can be a defense for specific crimes (larceny, attempt, solicitation, conspiracy and so on), but not for general intent crimes (arson, assault, battery, rape etc.). The defendant has the burden of proof for voluntary intoxication. Claiming that he would not commit the crime when sober is not a defense.

Involuntary intoxication is a defense where the defendant is not aware of ingesting the intoxicant, an intoxicant is taken under medical advice or under duress. However, intoxication due to peer pressure or addiction is not a defense.

==== Mistake ====
Mistake can be a mistake of fact or a mistake of law. Mistake of fact occurs when the defendant misunderstands a fact that negates an element of the crime. Mistake of law is the misunderstanding, incorrect application, or ignorance of the law's existence at the time of the offense. These mistakes must be honest, made in good faith, and reasonable to an ordinary person. Using mistake as a defense does not work in strict liability cases where the defendant's intent is irrelevant.

==== Duress ====
Duress is a defense where a crime is committed because of immediate threat to life or serious bodily injury posed by another. The person using the defense must establish that a reasonable person in the same position would have also committed the crime and that no alternative was available. Duress cannot be used as a defense in murder or if the defendant was responsible for getting into the situation that resulted in the threat.

==== Insanity defense ====
Insanity defense offers the excuse due to an episodic or persistent psychiatric disease that defeats legal responsibility at the time of the act. The state presumes that defendants are competent, requiring defendant to give proof or advance notice to raise the insanity defense. The five tests for insanity are:

- M'Naghten test shows that the defendant (1) did not know the nature and quality of the act or (2) the wrongfulness of the act.
- Irresistible impulse test shows that the defendant lacks the capacity for self-control and free choice because of mental disease or defect.
- Durham rule is a but-for test where the defendant is excused if the unlawful act is the cause of a mental disease or defect, and the defendant would not have committed the act if it was not for the disease or defect.
- Model Penal Code allows that if an act is a result of mental disease or defect, and the defendant lacked substantial capacity to recognize the wrongfulness of the act or conform to legal conduct.
- ALI rule extinguishes liability if as a result of mental disease of defect, the defendant lacks substantial capacity either to appreciate the criminality of the act or to act according to the requirements of the law.

The US uses the ALI rule to determine the validity of an insanity defense. Defendants found not guilty by reason of insanity are confined in a mental institution until such time as they are no longer be a danger to themselves or others, which may extend beyond the maximum criminal penalty for the offense.

== Crimes ==
American law generally categorizes the level of punishment and creates varied sentences, as opposed to the British common law "one size fits all". For example, the US addresses first-, second-, third- and fourth-degree murder with different sentences.

=== Crimes against persons ===
==== Homicide ====
Homicide is the unlawful killing of another human being. The two types of homicide are murder and manslaughter.

A person who accidentally causes a fatal car accident by losing control of an automobile on black ice and kills someone is still considered to have committed "homicide", but this is not a crime unless it is proven that it was not truly accidental. While the term "homicide" carries a criminal connotation, from a legal standpoint it is merely the "unlawful killing of another human being" and may not be punishable.

===== Murder =====
A murder is a homicide with malice aforethought, driven by an "endangering state of mind". The four ways to satisfy the element of malice are: an intent to kill (express malice), intent to inflict great bodily harm (implied malice).

====== Degrees ======
Most jurisdictions recognize at least two degrees of murder in statute. Usually, first-degree murder requires express malice. Any other type of murder reflects implied malice.

Felony murder is a crime where a death results from the crime and is typically first-degree, but may be second-degree. Felony murder applies when someone dies during the commission or attempted commission of another violent felony. It is called the felony murder rule and only requires the person to intend to commit the underlying felony, including burglary, arson, rape, robbery and kidnapping. The Redline Rule excludes the death of a co-felon who was killed during a justified homicide from a felony murder charge.

First-degree murder requires malice aforethought and "willful, deliberate and premeditation" of the homicide. Since it is the harshest degree of murder in terms of sentencing, a first-degree murder must be especially premeditated. Premeditation is the time and capacity to appreciate the evil of the act. A planned event, with a design to murder another human being, such as a gang member planning a contract murder or a serial killer outlining the steps to kidnapping his next victim, are committing premeditated acts when, if caught and charged, usually are accepted as proof of malicious premeditation.

Second-degree murder is initiated by any other crime that satisfies the general malice aforethought albeit "malice is merely implied". Second degree murder includes an intention to kill, but no plans to act. This includes depraved heart, where an act of high-risk conduct or acting in extreme recklessness is knowingly done to put the victim in danger.

Depraved heart murder occurs when defendant expresses a reckless disregard for the value of human life. This includes conduct that creates a high risk of death. This differs from involuntary manslaughter by a higher degree of recklessness.

The Model Penal Code does not categorize murder by degrees.

===== Manslaughter =====
Manslaughter is the lesser charge of homicide, lesser than murder. American jurisprudence has concluded that a loss of self-control, brought about through emotional states, can push a person to kill when it is not rationally intended. Earlier common law practices executed petty thieves as well as criminals whose motives were understood as emotionally challenging.

Voluntary manslaughter, although punishable, is an intentional form of homicide that involves certain elements to justify this lesser charge. The "Heat of Passion" and "Cooling off Period" are subjective justifications that are based on circumstance and motives where proof of murder is not available. For example, a person who, observing his spouse having sex with his lifelong rival, grabs a nearby gun, and immediately kills them, is more likely to be accused of manslaughter than murder. The killer is seen as consumed by passion so great that primal aggression overwhelms reason, but with no evidence of marital problems or the like.

A murder charge can become a voluntary manslaughter charge given proof of "legally adequate provocation". This standard combines heat of passion and cooling off. The question is, "Does the defendant have legally adequate provocation to have lost control?" Infidelity in such situations qualifies. Legally adequate provocation must go beyond insulting words to events, situations and circumstances that surprise the defendant and trigger the loss of reason without time to consider consequences or weigh pros and cons.

Involuntary manslaughter is an unintentional killing. The law requires proof of some form of malfeasance or misfeasance. Malfeasance is considered to be any dangerous, unlawful act and is a felony. Misfeasance includes any act, even lawful, that is criminally negligent and is a misdemeanor.

==== Robbery ====
Robbery at common law was the taking of the property of another with the intent to permanently deprive the person of that property by means of force or threat of force.

Robbery charges result in substantial sentences that may reach up to ten years with parole. Use of a deadly weapon increases the sentence and depends on the action of the defendant during the commission of the act. Robbery requires the acquisition of another's property and the use or threat of force to do so. A sleeping man cannot be aware that someone is taking his property. Therefore, a thief cannot be charged with robbery because no force is involved. Instead, the individual would likely be charged with larceny.

A person charged with robbery may reasonably but incorrectly believe they owned the object. Possession with respect to robbery is 9/10 of the law.

A thief who threatens future violence cannot be charged with robbery, because they did not use force or fear, and insulting words alone do not justify self-defense. Therefore, a person who steals from a victim using a deadly weapon, with or without immediate ability (the weapon is loaded) is committing robbery.

Although robbery includes the theft of property, it is not a property crime. The use or threat of force makes robbery a crime against persons.

==== Assault and battery ====
Assault is the act of physically or verbally attacking another.

Mayhem or malicious assault is the intentional dismemberment or disfiguring of a person. Stalking is the repeated observation, following, threatening, or harassing engendering fear of harm.

Battery is unconsented bodily contact with another or the intentional use of force against another. Battery is aggravated when using a weapon or dangerous object, when it results in disfigurement or serious physical injury.

Assault and battery are classified as aggravated when directed towards a person with special status such as a law enforcement officer or elderly person. Assault becomes aggravated given the intention to murder or rape.

==== Kidnapping and false imprisonment ====
Kidnapping is the holding of a person against their will with the intent to use the kidnapping in connection with some other crime. Parental kidnapping is the kidnapping of a child when a parent has no legal right to the child. Failure to release a person within 24 hours creates the presumption that the abductee has been transported through interstate commerce, allowing a federal investigation.

False imprisonment is the prevention of a person from leaving an area, interfering with the person's individual rights without authority. False imprisonment can be a criminal case or a civil case.

==== Sexual crimes ====
===== Rape =====
Rape is defined as penetration, no matter how slight, of the vagina or anus with any body part or object, or oral penetration by a sex organ of another person, without the consent of the victim.

Rape is generally a second-degree felony, except when accompanied by bodily injury or when the person is not the rapist's companion.

US rape law has evolved common law practices. A woman once had to prove resistance against her aggressor. Rape reformation laws in America did away with the standards of Hale Warning, corroborating evidence, and the early outcry doctrine, instead focusing on the aggressive, coercive nature of the rapist. Marital rape law once required "forcible, unlawful and carnal knowledge," and common law once asserted that rape did not apply between spouses. US women reported more rape under these rules; however, as of 2023, 63% of sexual assaults were not reported to police.

Rape shield laws were adopted in the 1970s and 1980s. They protect the victims' character and identity, while banning the inclusion of evidence relating to the victim's past sexual behavior. A federal rape shield law was adopted in 1994 under the Violence Against Women Act.

Rape can be non-forcible in cases where the victim in incapable of consenting due to a mental or emotional disability, or in statuary cases where the victim is underage, regardless of consent. Non-forcible rape are strict liability crimes, where the act alone is sufficient for proof.

===== Statutory Rape =====
Statutory rape, sometimes called unlawful sexual intercourse, occurs when an individual engages in sexual intercourse or oral sexual contact with a person who is not their legal spouse and is under the age of consent. Punishment may increase if the age gap is greater than a certain number of years, or if the minor is under another, younger age. For example, if the age of consent is 18, the state may punish the crime more severely if the minor is also two or more years younger than the perpetrator, or if the minor is younger than 16. Most states require the accused to be aware of the minor's age prior to or during the act.

=== Crimes against property ===
==== Arson ====
Arson is the malicious or reckless burning of property. The charge is aggravated when burning a dwelling. Second degree arson is the burning of uninhabited property. Third degree arson is the burning of personal property.

==== Burglary ====
Burglary is the unlawful breaking and entry of a property for the purpose of committing a felony. Burglary is committed upon entry of the property. Breaking requires the use of force for entry. Fraudulent entry can constitute constructive breaking. Entry can be constructive by using another person or object to reach inside. Larceny is not burglary.

==== Theft ====
Theft in the United States is the take property at the detriment of another. The property can be constructively possessed, where property entrusted to a person and is under their control, but still retained by owner.

Definitions of theft is codified in Title 18 of the United States Code Chapter 31.

Larceny is the taking and carrying away without consent of personal property of another intended to permanently deprive the person of that property.

A person cannot steal their own property, funds from joint accounts, spouses, or partnerships.

Larceny by trick involves taking another's property through fraud.

Embezzlement occurs when a person entrusted with the property, converts the property, deprives without permission or substantially interferes with owners' rights with the intent to defraud. Embezzlement differs from larceny in that the taking of property must not involve trespass.

False pretenses are crimes where a false representation is knowingly made, with the intent to defraud to transfer property title. The false representation can be made orally, in writing, or implied by action.

The information that is falsely represented must be material or relate to present or past facts, and not be opinions or predictions. The defendant must have known the statements were false or reckless. The main difference between false pretenses and larceny by trick is that the former involves only possession, whereas the latter involves obtaining title.

=== Public morality and order ===
For most of American history, various acts have been considered to be crimes that do not qualify as crimes against persons or property.

==== Prostitution ====
Prostitution is the exchange of sex for money. It is a crime in nearly all American jurisdictions.

==== Drugs ====
The Controlled Substances Act governs which substances cannot be used, made, sold, or distributed. Drug laws commonly fall into three categories: possession of drugs, distribution, and possession of paraphernalia. The use of drugs/addiction is not a crime. Drug laws consider weight, value, and intent. These laws form the basis of the trillion-dollar "drug war", that (based on drug prices) has not succeeded in reducing the demand for or supply of illegal drugs. Various jurisdictions have decriminalized possession of marijuana or some other drugs.

==== Bigamy and polygamy ====
Bigamy is the marriage of an already-married person to a third person. Polygamy is the practice of having multiple husbands/wives. For most of American history, both practices have been outlawed in all American jurisdictions.

==== Driving under the influence/Driving while intoxicated ====
Driving under the influence is operating a vehicle with a blood alcohol level greater than the legal limit, currently .08% in most jurisdictions. Earlier, driving under the influence was seen as a harmless offense that was typically overlooked.

=== Crimes against the state ===
==== Sovereignty and security ====
Treason is the crime of betraying the US.

=== Inchoate crimes ===
An inchoate crime is the crime of preparing for or seeking to commit another crime. Inchoate crimes include attempt, solicitation and conspiracy. Except for conspiracy, inchoate offenses merge into the completed offense/attempt.

==== Attempt ====
Attempt is effort to commit a crime that goes beyond preparation. To prove attempt, the person must have intended to commit a crime, acted with that criminal intent, and taken substantial steps towards completing the crime. Qualifying actions include asking an individual to join in on the crime, purchasing a weapon, or planning a crime and executing the steps to complete the plan. Usually, thoughts or preparation are insufficient. Attempt merges into the completion of a crime.

Several tests are used to prove intent including:

- Res ipsa loquitur looks at crime individually and finds an act indicating the defendant has no other purpose than to commit the specific crime.
- Proximity Test examines the acts that are taken and the remaining required acts. The completed acts must be in proximity to success.
- Model Penal Code - Substantial Step where steps taken towards the commission of a crime. Conduct must corroborate.

==== Solicitation ====
Solicitation is encouraging, requesting, enticing, or commanding another to commit a crime. The defendant must intend to convince another to commit the crime, and the crime of solicitation is completed when the defendant communicates the request to another party. The crime has been committed regardless of whether the other party agrees to the defendant's request or command.

==== Conspiracy ====
Conspiracy is agreement between two or more persons to commit a crime. Most jurisdictions require an overt act to further the conspiracy. Conspiracy requires a plurality of agreement. Wharton's Rule prevents the prosecution of two people for conspiracy when the offense in question can only be committed by at least two persons, as in crimes such as prostitution and gambling. In cases where Wharton's Rule applies, more than two people are required for conspiracy. Solicitation may be merged into conspiracy. Conspiracy does not merge into the completion of a crime.

=== Merging ===
Crimes may be merged when they are deemed to result from a single criminal act. A merger occurs when a defendant commits a single act that simultaneously fulfills the definition of two separate offenses. The lesser of the two offenses will drop out, and the defendant will only be charged with the greater offense. For example, if someone commits robbery, the crime of larceny would be merged and the defendant would be charged with robbery, the greater of the two offenses.

== See also ==
- United States Federal Sentencing Guidelines
