= Inchoate offense =

Crime of preparing for another crime

An inchoate offense, preliminary crime, inchoate crime or incomplete crime is a crime of preparing for or seeking to commit another crime. The three main kinds are attempt, solicitation, and conspiracy. "Inchoate offense" has been defined as "[c]onduct deemed criminal without actual harm being done, provided that the harm that would have occurred is one the law tries to prevent."

== Intent ==
Every inchoate crime or offense must have the mens rea of intent or of recklessness, typically intent. Absent a specific law, an inchoate offense requires that the defendant have the specific intent to commit the underlying crime. For example, for a defendant to be guilty of the inchoate crime of solicitation of murder, he or she must have intended for a person to die.

Attempt, conspiracy, and solicitation all require mens rea.

On the other hand, committing an offense under the US Racketeer Influenced and Corrupt Organizations Act merely requires "knowing", that is, recklessness. Facilitation also requires "believing", yet another way of saying reckless.

Intent may be distinguished from recklessness and criminal negligence as a higher mens rea.

=== Proof of intent ===
Specific intent may be inferred from circumstances. It may be proven by the doctrine of "dangerous proximity", while the Model Penal Code requires a "substantial step in a course of conduct".

== Merger doctrine ==
The doctrine of merger has been abandoned in many jurisdictions in cases involving a conspiracy, allowing an accused to be convicted of both conspiracy and the principal offense. However, an accused cannot be convicted of either attempt or solicitation and the principal offense.

== Defenses ==
A number of defenses are possible to the charge of an inchoate offense, depending on the jurisdiction and the nature of the offense.

=== Impossibility ===
Impossibility is no defense to the crime of attempt where the conditions creating the impossibility are unknown to the actor.

Originally at common law, impossibility was a complete defense; as it was under French law at one point. Indeed, the ruling in Collins's Case L. and C. 471 was that an offender cannot be guilty of an attempt to steal his own umbrella when he mistakenly believes that it belongs to another. Although the "moral guilt" for the attempt and the actual crime were the same, there was a distinction between the harm caused by a theft and the harmlessness of an impossible act. This principle was directly overruled in England with the rulings R v Ring and R v. Brown The example from R v Brown of an attempt to steal from an empty pocket is now a classic example of illustrating the point that impossibility is no defense to the crime of attempt when the conditions creating the impossibility are unknown to the actor. This principle has been codified in the Model Penal Code:

A person is guilty of an attempt to commit a crime if, acting with the kind of culpability otherwise required for commission of the crime he: purposely engages in conduct which would constitute the crime if the attendant circumstances were as he believes them to be. MPC § 5.01 (1)(a) (emphasis added).

Consequently, the principle is universal in the United States either in Model Penal Code jurisdictions (40 states) or those remaining common law jurisdictions influenced by the reasoning in R v Brown.

Other cases that illustrate the case law for impossibility defenses are People v. Lee Kong (CA, 1892), State v. Mitchell (MO, 1902), and United States v. Thomas (1962).

=== Abandonment ===
A defendant may plead and prove, as an affirmative defense, that they:

- Stopped all actions in furtherance of the crime or conspiracy
- Tried to stop the crime as it was ongoing
- Tried to convince the co-conspirators to halt such actions, or reported the crime to the police or other authorities

== Disputes ==
=== Burglaries as inchoate crimes ===
There is some scholarly treatment of burglaries in American law as inchoate crimes, but this is in dispute. According to scholar Frank Schmalleger, burglaries "are actually inchoate crimes in disguise."

Other scholars warn about the consequences of such a theory:

Burglary, as a preliminary step to another crime, can be seen as an inchoate, or incomplete, offense. As it disrupts the security of persons in their homes and in regard to their personal property, however, it is complete as soon as the intrusion is made. This dual nature is at the heart of a debate about whether the crime of burglary ought to be abolished, leaving its elements to be covered by attempt or as aggravating circumstances to other crimes, or retained and the grading schemes reformed to reflect the seriousness of the individual offense.

— McCord and McCord.

Certainly, possession of burglary tools, in those jurisdictions that criminalize that activity, creates an inchoate crime (going equipped in the UK). It is clear that:

In effect piling an inchoate crime onto an inchoate crime, the possession of burglary tools with the intent to use them in a burglary is a serious offense, a felony in some jurisdictions. Gloves that a defendant was trying to shake off as he ran from the site of a burglary were identified as burglar's tools in Green v. State (Fla. App. 1991).

— McCord and McCord.

== Examples ==
Examples of inchoate offenses include conspiracy, solicitation, facilitation, misprision of felony (and misprision generally), organized crime, Racketeer Influenced and Corrupt Organizations Act (RICO), and attempt, as well as some public health crimes; see the list below.

== List of inchoate offenses ==
- Being an accessory
- Attempt—see State v. Mitchell
- Compounding a felony
- Compounding treason
- Conspiracy
- Criminal facilitation
- Incitement
- Mail and wire fraud
- Misprision
- Misprision of felony
- Misprision of treason
- Offenses under the Racketeer Influenced and Corrupt Organizations Act (RICO)
- Solicitation
- Stalking
- Theftbote
- Treason Act 1429 - high treason to threaten arson for blackmail

== See also ==
- Criminal law
- Impossibility defense
- It takes two to tango
- Merger doctrine (criminal law)
- Pre-crime
- State v. Ochoa - complicity
- United States v. Felix
