= People v. Dlugash =

Decision from the Court of Appeals of New York

- Court: New York Court of Appeals
- Full case name: The People of the State of New York, Appellant, v. Melvin Dluglash, Respondent.
- Decided: May 12, 1977
- Citation: 395 N.Y.S.2d 419; 41 N.Y.2d 715; 363 N.E.2d 1155

Court membership
- Judges sitting: Charles D. Breitel, Matthew J. Jasen, Domenick L. Gabrielli, Hugh R. Jones, Sol Wachtler, Lawrence H. Cooke, Jacob D. Fuchsberg

Case opinions
- Majority: Jasen, joined by Breitel, Gabrielli, Jones, Wachtler, Fuchsberg, Cooke

People v. Dlugash (1977) was a pivotal decision from the Court of Appeals of New York involving the principle of attempt in criminal law. It established that "legal impossibility," where one or more legal elements of a crime cannot be met, is not a defense for an attempt charge. This revolutionized the way New York courts analyze attempt, by shifting the focus from external circumstances to the state of mind of the defendant. The court stated that they looked to the Model Penal Code (MPC) for guidance in writing this decision, and recognized the MPC's goal of eliminating all types of impossibility as a defense for attempt.

The allegations against the defendant Melvin Dlugash were that he had shot Michael Geller in 1973, a few minutes after another man had shot Geller during an argument. Dlugash allegedly shot Geller's dead body out of fear, and with the hope of placating the actual killer by showing solidarity.

He was charged with and convicted of attempted murder. In 1976, the Appellate Division of the State Supreme Court in Brooklyn reversed his conviction, ruling that "the People failed to prove beyond a reasonable doubt that Geller had been alive at the time he was shot by defendant; defendant's conviction of murder thus cannot stand".

Despite this, the jury believed that Dlugash intended to kill the victim, so the Court of Appeals of New York upheld Dlugash's attempted murder conviction in 1977.

The case has been cited as an example of the role of complicity in law.
