= State v. Mitchell =

Decision of the Supreme Court of Missouri

State v. Mitchell, 170 Mo. 633, 71 S.W. 175 (1902), is a precedent-setting decision of the Supreme Court of Missouri which is part of the body of case law involving the prosecution of failed attempts to commit a crime. In United States law, cases involving failed criminal attempts can bring up interesting legal issues of whether the crime was unsuccessful due to factual impossibility or to legal impossibility.

== Background ==
Mistakes of fact have rarely been an adequate defense at common law. In the United States, 37 states have ruled out mistake of fact as a defense to charges of attempt. Mistakes of law have proved a more successful defense.

=== Mistakes of fact ===
A "factual" impossibility occurs when, at the time of the attempt, the facts make the intended crime impossible to commit, even though the defendant is unaware of this when the attempt is made. In People v. Lee Kong, 95 Cal. 666, 30 P. 800 (1892), a case from the Supreme Court of California, the defendant was found guilty of attempted murder for shooting at a hole in the roof, believing his victim to be there, and indeed, where his victim had been only moments before but was not at the time of the shooting. Another case involving the defense of factual impossibility is the Supreme Court of Pennsylvania's decision in Commonwealth v. Johnson, 167 A. 344, 348 (Pa. 1933), in which a wife intended to put arsenic in her husband's coffee but by mistake added the customary sugar instead. Later, she felt repentant and confessed her acts to the police. She was arrested, tried, and convicted of attempted murder. In United States v. Thomas, 13 U.S.C.M.A. 278 (1962), the United States Court of Military Appeals held that men who believed they were raping a drunken, unconscious woman were guilty of attempted rape, even though the woman was actually dead at the time the sexual intercourse took place.

=== Mistakes of law ===
An act that is considered legally impossible to commit is traditionally considered a valid defense for a person prosecuted for a criminal attempt. An attempt is considered to be a "legal" impossibility when the defendant has completed all of his intended acts, but those acts fail to fulfill all the required common law elements of a crime. Mistake of law has proved a successful defense. An example of a legally failed attempt is a person who shoots a tree stump; that person can not be prosecuted for attempted murder as there is no manifest intent to kill by shooting a stump. The underlying rationale is that attempting to do what is not a crime is not attempting to commit a crime.

However, "legal" and "factual" mistakes are not mutually exclusive. A borderline case is that of a person who shot a stuffed deer, thinking it was alive. That person was originally convicted for attempting to kill a protected animal out of season, but in a debatable reversal, an appellate judge threw out the conviction on the basis that it is no crime to shoot a stuffed deer out of season.

== Facts of the case ==
In Mitchell, the defendant fired shots into a room at night where his intended victim usually slept, intending to murder the victim. One bullet struck the victim's usual pillow. But the defendant did not know that the victim was sleeping elsewhere that particular night. Using these circumstances (that the bed was empty), the defendant pleaded not guilty on the grounds that the intended crime was factually impossible to commit, as there was no victim in the room into which he fired.

At trial, the defendant was found guilty of attempted murder. The fact that the intended crime was impossible for the defendant to commit was not considered a defense for the charge of attempting to commit a felony, in this case murder.

The defendant then appealed his judgment of conviction and sentence.

== Decision ==
On appeal, the Supreme Court of Missouri affirmed Mitchell's conviction and sentence, holding that the objective itself was criminal in nature and only a circumstance unknown to the defendant prevented its completion. The court held that a person who shoots into the bed of another person on purpose, believing that person to be in the bed, is guilty of attempted murder. The court ruled that "when the consequences sought by a defendant are forbidden by law as criminal, it is not defense that the defendant could not succeed in reaching his goal because of circumstances unknown to him."

== Significance ==
This case is part of a body of law developed in the United States on the issue of how to handle attempt cases. In most United States jurisdictions, the defense that the act was a factual impossibility is not a valid defense. A case similar to this one is State v. Moretti 52 N.M. 182, 244 A.2d 499 (1968), in which the defendant agreed to perform a (then illegal) abortion upon a female undercover officer. Although the female police officer was not pregnant, the Supreme Court of New Mexico upheld the conviction:

...when the consequences sought by a defendant are forbidden by the law as criminal, it is no defense that the defendant could not succeed in reaching his goal because of circumstances unknown to him.

With few exceptions, all cases in which an attempt to commit a felony was impossible to carry out because the defendant was mistaken in fact have been categorized as factually impossible and the conviction was upheld on appeal.
