= People v. Jaffe =

Criminal Case

People v. Jaffe, 185 N.Y. 497 (1906), is a criminal case that held that attempt to receive stolen goods was a legal impossibility if the goods have been recovered, then delivered to the accused as part of a sting operation, because they lost their legal status of being stolen when they were recovered.

The court wrote:

"A clerk stole goods from his employer under an agreement to sell them to the accused, but before delivery of the goods, the theft was discovered, and the goods were recovered. Later the employer redelivered the goods to the clerk to sell to the accused, who purchased them for about one-half of their value, believing them to have been stolen.

"Held, that the goods had lost their character as stolen goods at the time defendant purchased them and that his criminal intent was insufficient to sustain a conviction for an attempt to receive stolen property, knowing it to have been stolen."
