= People v. Saephanh =

- Court: California Court of Appeals
- Full case name: The People, Plaintiff and Respondent, v. Lou Tong Saephanh, Defendant and Appellant.
- Decided: April 28, 2000
- Citations: 80 Cal. App. 4th 451; 94 Cal. Rptr. 910

Court membership
- Judges sitting: Nikolas Dibiaso, Thomas A. Harris, Joseph Kalashian (Note: Appointed from Tulare Superior Court)

Case opinions
- Decision by: Harris
- Concurrence: Dibiaso, Kalashian

People v. Saephanh, 80 Cal. App. 4th 451, 94 Cal. Rptr. 910 (2001), is a United States criminal case in which it was determined that solicitation of another person to commit a crime can occur even if the solicitation is never communicated to that person. Saephanh conceived a child with a woman, was imprisoned, and from prison wrote a letter soliciting another person to attack the woman to terminate the pregnancy. The letter was intercepted by a prison official before it was delivered. The court held that solicitation did not occur, but that "attempted solicitation" did, even though this was a doubly inchoate crime (i.e., neither the attack nor the communication actually occurred).
