= Criminal defenses =

Defenses used in criminal law

In the field of criminal law, there are a variety of conditions that will tend to negate elements of a crime (particularly the intent element), known as defenses. The label may be apt in jurisdictions where the accused may be assigned some burden before a tribunal. However, in many jurisdictions, the entire burden to prove a crime is on the prosecution, which also must prove the absence of these defenses, where implicated. In other words, in many jurisdictions the absence of these so-called defenses is treated as an element of the crime. So-called defenses may provide partial or total refuge from punishment.

A partial defense is a defense that does not completely absolve the defendant of guilt. A claim of self-defense, for example, may be a complete defense to a charge of murder, leading to an acquittal; or it may be a partial defense, which leads to conviction to a lesser verdict, such as manslaughter. In the United Kingdom, successfully pleading a partial defense for murder may reduce the conviction to voluntary manslaughter. There are three types of partial defense to the charge of murder - loss of control (which replaced "provocation" in 2010), diminished responsibility, and suicide pact.

== Types of defenses in a court of law ==
=== Mental disorder (insanity) ===
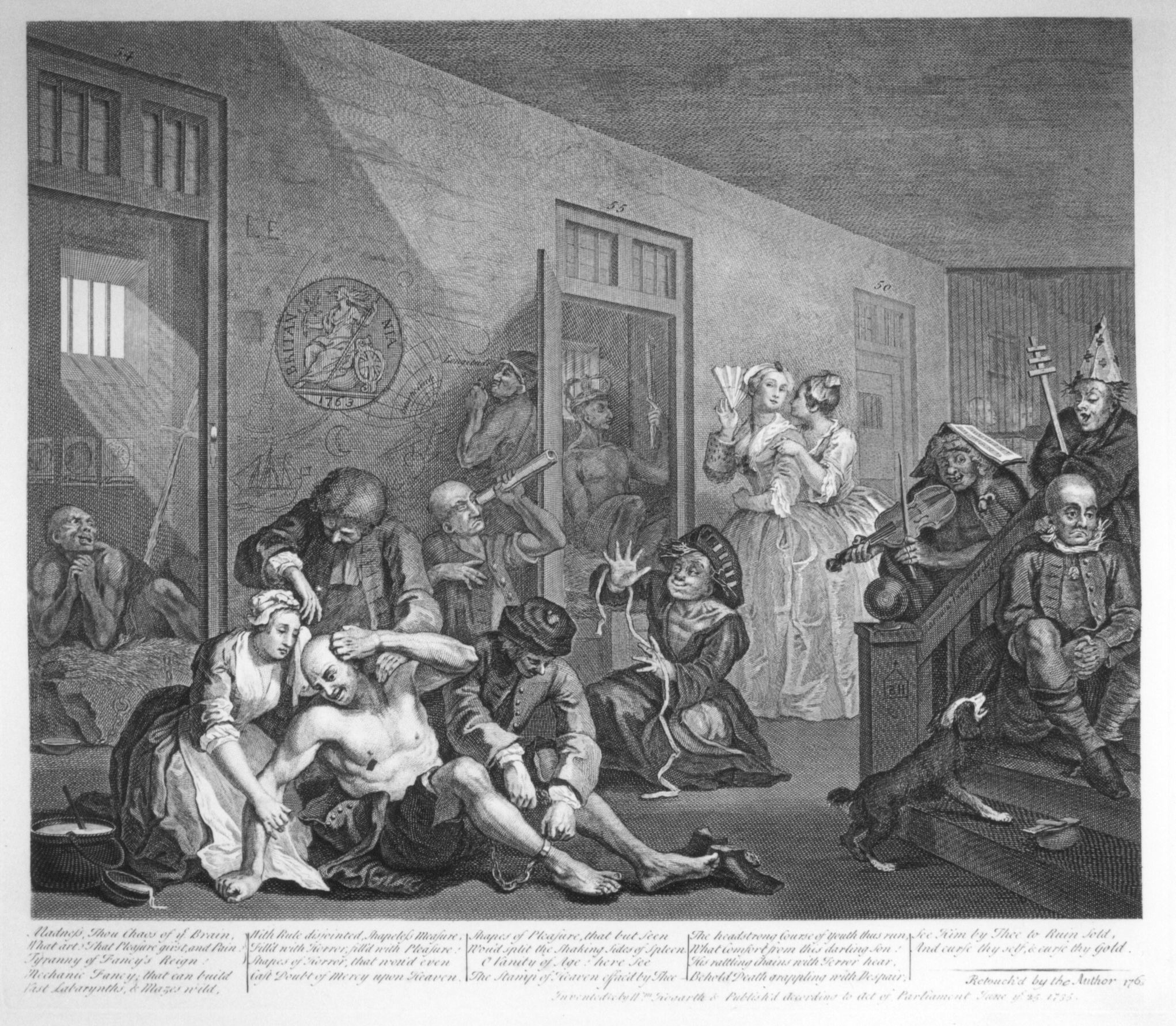
William Hogarth's A Rake's Progress, depicting the world's oldest psychiatric hospital, Bethlem Hospital

Insanity or mental disorder (Australia and Canada), may negate the intent of any crime, although it pertains only to those crimes having an intent element. A variety of rules have been advanced to define what, precisely, constitutes criminal insanity. The most common definitions involve either an actor's lack of understanding of the wrongfulness of the offending conduct, or the actor's inability to conform conduct to the law. If one succeeds in being declared "not guilty by reason of insanity," then the result frequently is treatment in a mental hospital, although some jurisdictions provide the sentencing authority with flexibility. As further described in articles available online.

=== Automatism ===
Automatism is a state where the muscles act without any control by the mind, or with a lack of consciousness. One may suddenly fall ill, into a dream like state as a result of post traumatic stress, or even be "attacked by a swarm of bees" and go into an automatic spell. However, to be classed as an "automaton" means there must have been a total destruction of voluntary control, which does not include a partial loss of consciousness as the result of driving for too long. Where the onset of loss of bodily control was blameworthy, e.g., the result of voluntary drug use, it may be a defense only to specific intent crimes.

Examples of this would be provocation, intoxication and mental illness, provocation means the victim provoked the defendant with illegal behavior, therefore, the defendant lost self control and attacked the victim. Therefore, a criminal defense lawyer would argue that the victim should not have said or done certain illegal actions that would make someone lose self control. Intoxication is where the defendant was unaware of their actions due to being under the influence of certain drugs or alcoholic beverages. Therefore, a criminal defense lawyer might be able to argue a good case, depending on what was used and if there was a party. Mental illness is where the defendant has a certain mental condition that makes them incapable of understanding right and wrong. A good case would be dementia, schizophrenia, etc. a criminal defense lawyer would be able to argue a good case, if evidence of disability papers are there.

=== Intoxication ===
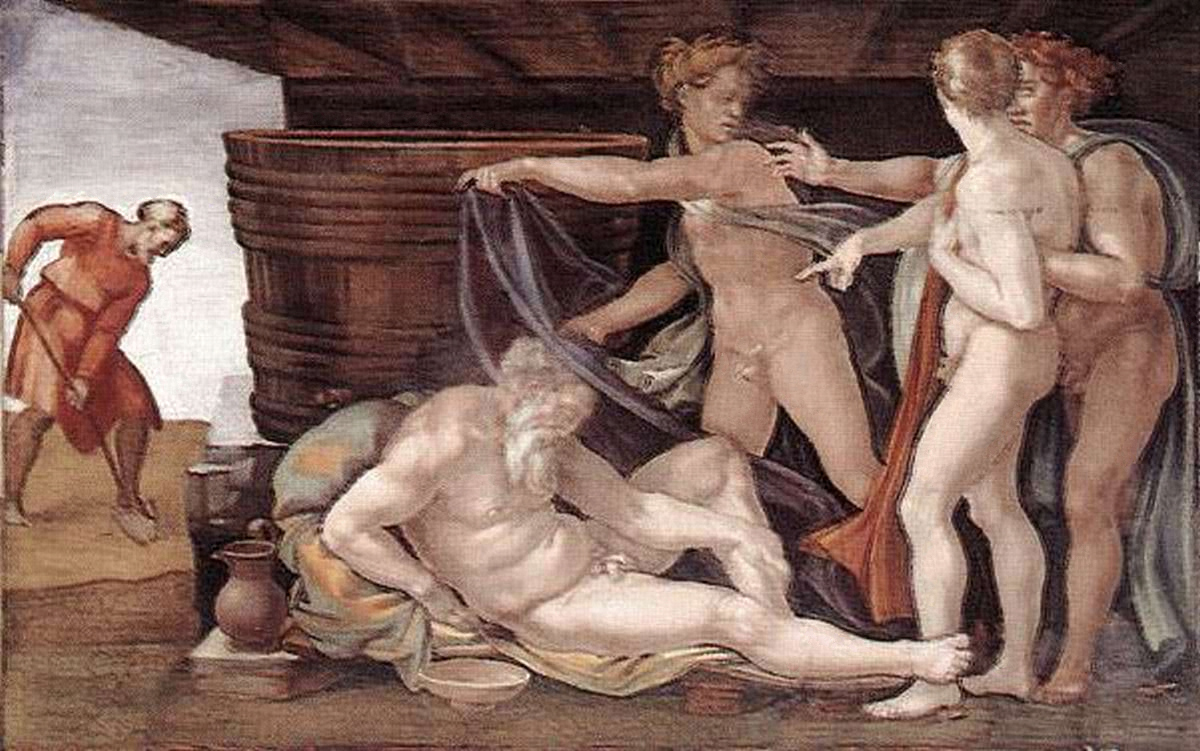
The Drunkenness of Noah by Michelangelo

In some jurisdictions, intoxication may negate specific intent, a particular kind of mens rea applicable only to some crimes. For example, lack of specific intent might reduce murder to manslaughter. Voluntary intoxication nevertheless often will provide basic intent, e.g., the intent required for manslaughter. On the other hand, involuntarily intoxication, for example by punch spiked unforeseeably with alcohol, may give rise to no inference of basic intent.

Strictly speaking, however, it could be argued that intoxication is not a defense, but a denial of mens rea; the main difference being that a defense accepts the mens rea and actus reus of an offence are present. With intoxication, there is no acceptance of the mens rea of the offence. For offences of basic intent, the act itself is criminalised. All that is needed is the intent to do the act. It can therefore be inferred that there is such intent relatively easily; when intoxicated one is not an automaton - there is still control of one's actions. Therefore, intoxication will rarely (if ever) deny the mens rea of crimes of basic intent. With specific intent, the character of the act is criminalised, for the act itself is often objectively innocent. Appropriation of an item is perfectly innocent, yet when one appropriates with the intent to permanently deprive the owner of it, there is a theft. This is much more difficult to prove beyond reasonable doubt, for an intoxicated person may exercise control over his actions but will often lack an understanding of what is being done - without this understanding the necessary intent cannot be proven. Therefore, whilst it is tempting to think of intoxication as a defense, it is more accurate to see it as a denial of the mens rea of an offence - where the mens rea or actus reus is not proven, there is no need for defenses.

=== Mistake of fact ===
"I made a mistake" is a defense in some jurisdictions if the mistake is about a fact and is genuine. The defense is most often used in conjunction with another defense, where the mistake led the defendant to believe that their actions were justifiable under the second defense. For example, a charge of assault on a police officer may be negated by genuine (and perhaps reasonable) mistake of fact that the person the defendant assaulted was a criminal and not an officer, thus allowing a defense of use of force to prevent a violent crime (generally part of self-defense/defense of person).

=== Necessity/lesser harm ===
An overarching theory of criminal defenses is the doctrine of necessity. Generally speaking, a criminal act can be justifiable if it is necessary to prevent a foreseeable and greater harm than the harm created by the act. For instance, trespassing is generally justified if the defendant only trespassed in order to, for instance, instantaneously attempt to put out a fire on the property, or to rescue someone drowning in a pool on the property. The destruction or death caused by following the law and not trespassing would have been far greater than the harm caused by trespassing. Similarly, most laws forbidding the discharge of firearms in public contain an exception for emergency or defensive use. Necessity generally forms the basis for many other defenses and their favor, such as capacity of office, legal duty, and self-defense.

=== Lawful capacity of office ===
This defense is generally available to public servants and first responders, such as police officers, firefighters, EMTs, etc. It usually protects the first responder from responsibility for otherwise criminal actions that the first responder must perform as an appointed agent of the jurisdiction in the course and scope of their duties. For example, a paramedic who forcibly enters a house or building in answer to an emergency call cannot be charged with breaking and entering. A judge who sentences a man to die for a crime cannot be charged with attempted murder if the convicted man is later exonerated. Such protection is generally limited to acts required in the course and scope of employment, and it does not preclude gross negligence or malicious intent.

==== Legal duty ====
This "lawful capacity of office" defense can also apply to civilians who do not hold such a position, but whose assistance is requested by someone who does, such as a police officer. A person who witnesses a criminal being chased by police who yell "stop that man!", and obliges resulting in injury to the criminal, cannot be charged with assault or sued for personal injury. "Good Samaritan" laws generally provide immunity in civil and criminal proceedings to persons who, in good faith, cause injury while attempting to help a person in distress, protecting such persons even in cases where greater harm resulted from the action than would have occurred otherwise.

=== Self-defense ===
Self-defense is, in general, some reasonable action taken in protection of self. An act taken in self-defense often is not a crime at all; no punishment will be imposed. To qualify, any defensive force must be proportionate to the threat. Use of a firearm in response to a non-lethal threat is a typical example of disproportionate force; however, such decisions are dependent on the situation and the applicable law, and thus the example situation can in some circumstances be defensible, Generally because of a codified presumption intended to prevent the unjust negation of this defense by the trier of fact.

=== Duress ===
One who is "under duress" is forced into an unlawful act. Duress can be a defense in many jurisdictions, although not for the most serious crimes of murder, attempted murder, being an accessory to murder and in many countries, treason. The duress must involve the threat of imminent peril of death or serious injury, operating on the defendant's mind and overbearing his will. Threats to third persons may qualify. The defendant must reasonably believe the threat, and there is no defense if "a sober person of reasonable firmness, sharing the characteristics of the accused" would have responded differently. Age, pregnancy, physical disability, mental illness, sexuality have been considered, although basic intelligence has been rejected as a criterion.

The accused must not have foregone some safe avenue of escape. The duress must have been an order to do something specific, so that one cannot be threatened with harm to repay money and then choose to rob a bank to repay it. If one puts themselves in a position where they could be threatened, duress may not be a viable defense.

=== Impossibility defense ===
An impossibility defense is a criminal defense occasionally used when a defendant is accused of a criminal attempt that failed only because the crime was factually or legally impossible to commit.

=== Consent ===
In law, consent can be a full or partial defense to certain types of crimes. It tends to be an absolute defense if no permanent harm resulted, and otherwise may be a partial defense. An example is the rough sex murder defense.

== See also ==
- Liability
- Criminal law
