= State v. Lyerla =

South Dakota criminal case

- Court: Supreme Court of South Dakota
- Full case name: State of South Dakota, Plaintiff and Appellee. v. Gerald K. Lyerla, Defendant and Appellant.
- Decided: June 8, 1988
- Citation: 424 N.W.2d 908

Court membership
- Judges sitting: George W. Wuest, Robert E. Morgan, Frank Henderson, Richard W. Sabers, John K. Konenkamp (Note: Circuit judge; sitting in place of Robert A. Miller)

Case opinions
- Decision by: Konenkamp
- Concurrence: Morgan, Henderson, Wuest
- Dissent: Sabers

Keywords
- Homicide; Intent

State v. Lyerla, Supreme Court of South Dakota, 424 N.W.2d 908 (1988), is a criminal case in which it was found that an attempt to commit a crime with an element of recklessness is a logical impossibility; specifically, that attempted second degree murder is logically impossible.

Lyerla randomly shot into a truck three times after being goaded by the driver of the truck. One shot killed the driver and the others did not hit the driver or either of two passengers.

Lyerla was convicted of second degree murder for killing the driver. Lyerla was convicted on two counts of attempted second degree murder of each passenger.

Lyerla appealed on the ground that it is a logical impossibility to attempt second degree murder, since attempt requires specific intent and recklessness implies lack of such intent. Implied in the jury finding of second degree murder, rather than first degree murder which was also sought, was lack of specific intent to kill anyone in the truck, but rather a reckless disregard for their life.

The court agreed with Lyerla and reversed the conviction. The court wrote:

"In order to attempt to commit a crime, there must exist in the mind of the perpetrator the specific intent to commit the acts constituting the offence. To attempt second degree murder one must intend to have a criminally reckless state of mind... [a] logical impossibility."
