= Holloway v. United States =

- Supreme Court of the United States

Argued November 9, 1998 Decided March 2, 1999
- Full case name: Francois Holloway, a.k.a. Abdu Ali v. United States
- Citations: 526 U.S. 1 (more) 119 S. Ct. 966; 143 L. Ed. 2d 1

Case history
- Prior: United States v. Arnold, 126 F.3d 82 (2d Cir. 1997); cert. granted, 523 U.S. 1093 (1998).

Holding
- The federal carjacking law does apply to carjacking crimes committed by defendants with the "conditional intent" of harming drivers who resist the highjacker.

Court membership
- Chief Justice William Rehnquist Associate Justices John P. Stevens · Sandra Day O'Connor; Antonin Scalia · Anthony Kennedy; David Souter · Clarence Thomas; Ruth Bader Ginsburg · Stephen Breyer

Case opinions
- Majority: Stevens, joined by Rehnquist, O'Connor, Kennedy, Souter, Ginsburg, Breyer
- Dissent: Scalia
- Dissent: Thomas

Laws applied
- 526 U.S. 1 (1999)

Holloway v. United States, 526 U.S. 1 (1999), is a United States Supreme Court case in which the court addressed the issue of whether the federal carjacking law applies to crimes committed with the "conditional intent" of harming drivers who refuse a carjacker's demands.

Federal law considers the act of hijacking an automobile as carjacking only if the hijacker did so with the intent to kill or inflict serious bodily harm to the driver of the car.

== Facts of case ==
Francois Holloway, a.k.a. Abdu Ali, was charged with three counts of carjacking as defined by 18 U.S.C. § 2119. Holloway's co-defendant and prosecuting witness testified that, although he pointed a gun at the driver and threatened to shoot him unless the driver relinquished the car and keys, the intent was to steal the vehicles and not to harm the occupants. However, he testified he would have used his gun if it was necessary to obtain the car. The jury was instructed that the requisite intent under law may be conditional and the government would have satisfied the condition of intent if it proved that the defendant intended to cause death or bodily harm if the drivers refused to comply. Thereafter, the jury found Holloway guilty. The Court of Appeals affirmed the conviction, holding that a conditional intent to harm was within the bounds of a reasonable interpretation of the legislative purpose behind the federal carjacking law.

The Supreme Court granted Holloway's writ of certiorari.

== Decision ==
The Court decided in a 7–2 decision that the federal carjacking law does apply to carjacking crimes committed by defendants with the "conditional intent" of harming drivers who resist the hijacker. The requirement of intent is satisfied if the government proves that at the moment the crime is committed, the defendant possessed the intent to seriously harm or kill the driver if this was necessary to steal the car. The court's reasoning was that the federal statute's element of mens rea is directed at the defendant's state of mind at that moment in time when he hijacks the vehicle. A reading of 18 U.S.C. § 2119 shows no distinction between conditional or unconditional intent and therefore does not expressly exclude either species of intent. The court concluded that a reasonable interpretation of the statute is that it covers both conditional and unconditional intent.

The Court also presumed that when Congress enacted the carjacking statute, it was aware of opinions regarding the issue of intent and therefore recognized that "the 'specific intent' to commit a wrongful act may be conditional".

== Discussion ==
18 U.S.C. § 2119 requires intent to cause a result, but actual occurrence of the result is not an element of the offense of carjacking. It is clear that the government prosecution, to establish a carjacking charge, must prove that a defendant acted with the "intent to cause" death or harm. There is no requirement that this intent had to have actually resulted to complete the elements for the carjacking offense. Rather, the substantive harm that must result is the taking of a motor vehicle, by force and violence or by intimidation, from the person or in the presence of the victim. Therefore, the intent necessary to commit a carjacking is a conditional intent. The defendant does not have to indicate a desire to injure the victim if the jury can infer that, if the victim had refused to give up his car, the carjacker would have harmed him.

The Court's conclusion is also supported by another consideration. The defendant's interpretation of the statute would remove from the statute any coverage of the conduct that Congress specifically intended to prohibit. It can be assumed that Congress was familiar with the leading opinions and court cases regarding the need for allowing specific intent to commit a wrongful act to be conditional under certain conditions.

The issue of conditional purpose is addressed in Model Penal Code § 2.02(6), which states that, "When a particular purpose is an element of an offense, the element is established although such purpose is conditional...".

== See also ==
- List of United States Supreme Court cases, volume 526
- List of United States Supreme Court cases
- Lists of United States Supreme Court cases by volume
