= Regina v Ring =

Regina v Ring, 17 Cox CC. 491, 66 L.T. (NS) 306 (1892), is a criminal case which held that if a pickpocket put his hand in a victim's pocket, but the pocket was empty, he was still guilty of attempted larceny, even though there was nothing to steal, so he was attempting an "impossible" crime.
