= Criminal jurisdiction =

Legal term

Criminal jurisdiction is a term used in constitutional law and public law to describe the power of courts to hear a case brought by a state accusing a defendant of the commission of a crime. It is relevant in three distinct situations:

1. to regulate the relationship between states, or between one state and another;
2. where the nation is a federation, to regulate the relationship between the federal courts and the domestic courts of those states comprising the federation; and
3. where a state only has, to a greater or lesser extent, a single and unified system of law, it is the law of criminal procedure to regulate what cases each classification of court within the judicial system shall adjudicate upon. People must be tried in the same state the crime is committed.

== Extraterritorial issues ==
=== Supranational courts ===
Under the public international law system, de jure states are sovereign within their own territorial boundaries. A few states such as the Netherlands have adopted a monist approach, i.e. they accept international and municipal laws as part of a single system. Thus, whether a supranational court or tribunal has criminal jurisdiction over its territory or citizens, will be determined by international law. The majority of states are dualist, i.e. they will only accept international obligations through the process of incorporation, say by signing and adopting treaties and conventions. Hence, whether a supranational court or tribunal will have jurisdiction and, if so, over what subject matter and over what period of time, will be decided by the sovereign government of the day.

=== Extraterritorial jurisdiction in international law ===
Because each government is supreme, it can enact whatever statutes it wishes. Thus, State A would have the power to make a law which, for example, made it an offence to smoke in the streets of State B, a neighbouring state. State A could employ officers and equip them with cameras. These officers could then collect evidence in State B and, when its citizens returned home, State A could prosecute them for breach of the law. But State A's law could not be directly effective in State B because that would make State B less than sovereign. Similarly, State A could not seek the extradition of its own citizens from State B unless State B was formally to consent (usually through the negotiation of a treaty including the particular offence).

=== International crime ===
Transborder crimes take place in more than one state. For example, a defendant may fire a gun, post a package, or write or speak words in State A, but the effects of each action are felt in State B. Some states claim a public policy justification to exercise jurisdiction over crimes committed by, or crimes committed against their citizens, even though these crimes are committed outside their borders. Thus, one of the classifications of crime is "crimes against the state". These are crimes that affect the interests of the state or its administration. In extreme cases, a state may wish to prosecute one of its own citizens for treason even though all the relevant acts and omissions took place in another state. Similarly, if a citizen of State A is acting in a way that interferes with the friendly relations between State A and State B, it may be expedient to prosecute this citizen no matter where the relevant acts have been committed. Jurisdiction may also be claimed over crimes on board the ships and aircraft operated by corporations based in the given state, no matter where these craft may be located at the relevant time. In English law, where murder and manslaughter are concerned, the English court has jurisdiction over offences committed abroad, if committed by a British citizen (see section 9 of the Offences against the Person Act 1861 and section 3 of the British Nationality Act 1948). In R v Cheong (2006) AER (D) 385 the appellant was living in Guyana in 1983. He shot and killed a man who had just robbed his wife and sister-in-law. Under local law he was charged only with the unlicensed possession of a firearm; but as a British citizen, section 9 of the 1861 Act applied 19 years after he returned to England and he was charged with murder. On appeal, a conviction for manslaughter was upheld. At a level of conventional policy, there are two main theories to justify the exercise of jurisdiction:

==== The initiatory or subjective theory ====
The state in which the sequence of events begins, claims jurisdiction because the accused did everything in his or her power to commit the offence within its territory. Intending to deceive Y into parting with money, X writes a begging letter claiming to be a penniless widow with ten starving children and posts it in State A. X must then rely on the postal workers to carry the letter to Y in State B. No matter how hard X tries, X cannot take any further action to promote the scheme, and whether it succeeds or fails is entirely outside his or her ability to control. There are three theoretical issues to consider:

- the definition of the actus reus elements of the crime must be wide enough to include a continuing sequence of events. Some offences are either frozen in time or geography because they are defined either as activities being undertaken when the harm occurs (e.g. driving offences), or in terms of their consequences. For example, the definition of a "deception" is some form of dishonest representation that induces the victim to do or refrain from doing something that causes him or her loss. Anything else is preparatory or anticipatory to this key intellectual event. Thus, to facilitate a prosecution of X, the definition of the offence in State A must include writing and posting the letter in State A as well as the operation of the letter upon the mind of the recipient in the State B.
- State A would be prosecuting conduct occurring within its borders that does not constitute the complete actus reus, i.e. unless and until the letter is read by the recipient, the deception cannot operate or fail. The alternative would be to consider X's actions of writing and posting the letter as preparatory acts and so an attempt. This would be sensible if the letter fails to convince Y, but a nonsense if the letter actually induces Y into sending a cheque back to X.
- the policy that caused State A to criminalise the given actus reus must justify a prosecution even though no actual injury or damage has been sustained to a person resident within the territory of State A. The usual justification for criminalising any set of acts or omissions is as a deterrent to protect local citizens. It is not usually the policy of State A to protect the citizens of State B from harm: that duty arises out of the social contract between State B and its own citizens.

In English law, see the definition of a deception which must be the operative cause of the "obtaining" in the deception offences and under the Theft Act 1978, and note that all the inchoate offencess move in time and across borders so that an attempt continues from the proximate act until failure, a conspiracy agreement is not limited to a particular place, and the encouragement by a secondary party as an accessory continues until the principal commits the substantive offence.

==== The terminatory or objective theory ====
If the injury or damage affects a citizen within the territory of a state, it would be usual for that state to claim jurisdiction to protect the interests of those who are present within its borders. But X would not have taken any action within State B's borders, so the wording of the actus reus must permit a prosecution in this situation. The theoretical justification for this jurisdiction may be that X has intended to cause the loss or injury and so should not escape liability through the device of only seeking to deceive those resident outside State A (a strategy that would be very simple given the internet). The justification is less clear when the place of injury is an accident. Within a single state, the doctrine of transferred intent would apply to criminalise accidental departures from a planned attack, but if X's letter is redirected out of State A by one of Y's helpful relatives, the receipt of the letter by Y on holiday in State B is entirely outside X's actual intention (just it might be irrelevant to a sender where the recipient of an e-mail is resident). Alternatively, suppose that X physically attacks Y in State A, intending to kill him. Both are nationals of State A. Y is seriously injured and, because the hospitals in State B have a superior track record for treating injuries of this type, Y arranges to be transferred to State B where he later dies. Again, there is no causal connection between X's initial criminal acts and the territory of State B, and seeking to found jurisdiction simply on the ground that Y died within its borders, is not wholly convincing given that Y is not a national of State B and so neither owes allegiance nor is owed any duty of protection as a part of State B's social contract.

== In the United States ==
The United States is a federation of states. The U.S. Constitution creates a federal government and legislature that has general powers over the territory of the whole and over foreign policy, whereas the individual states have their own governments that, within the scope allowed by the federal constitution, have local territorial jurisdiction. There is a system of federal courts which have jurisdiction to hear charges alleging federal crimes, and state courts have jurisdiction to hear charges alleging violations of local state law.

=== U.S. federal courts ===
Under the U.S. Constitution, the power of Congress to enact criminal statutes is limited; the federal government lacks "plenary criminal jurisdiction." The powers of Congress to enact criminal laws "are not boundless." The U.S. Constitution mentions explicit authority for Congress in three areas: (1) counterfeiting, (2) piracy and felony on the high seas and offenses against the law of nations, and (3) treason. However, the "necessary and proper" clause of the Constitution gives Congress "broad power to enact laws that are 'convenient or useful' or 'conductive' to the authority's 'beneficial exercise' ".

The United States district courts have original, exclusive subject matter jurisdiction over "all offenses against the laws of the United States."

Some crimes are related to areas owned by or under the exclusive jurisdiction of the federal government. Examples of these crimes include those committed in the District of Columbia, in U.S. Territories, in U.S. National Parks, in federal courthouses and federal prisons, and aboard airplanes (regulated by the Federal Aviation Administration) and ocean-going vessels. The United States military has its own criminal justice system applicable to its members, and civilians may be charged with a federal crime for acts committed on military bases. Federal courts also have jurisdiction to hear cases brought against U.S. citizens based on their illegal activities in other countries.

The Sixth Amendment calls for trial “by an impartial jury of the State and district wherein the crime shall have been committed.” Within the federal court system, Rule 18 of the Federal Rules of Criminal Procedure specifies which federal court may hear a particular criminal case:

Unless a statute or these rules permit otherwise, the government must prosecute an offense in a district where the offense was committed. The court must set the place of trial within the district with due regard for the convenience of the defendant and the witnesses, and the prompt administration of justice.

Anderson, 328 U.S., at 703 holds: “[T]he locus delicti must be determined from the nature of the crime alleged and the location of the act or acts constituting it.” In Hyde v. United States, 225 U.S. 347 (1912) although none of the defendants had entered the District of Columbia as part of their conspiracy to defraud the United States, they were convicted because one co-conspirator had committed overt acts in Columbia (225 U.S., at 363). So conspiracy is a continuing offense committed in all the districts where a co-conspirator acts on the agreement. Similarly, In re Palliser, 136 U.S. 257 (1890) the sending of letters from New York to postmasters in Connecticut in an attempt to gain postage on credit, made Connecticut, where the mail he addressed and dispatched was received, an appropriate venue (136 U.S., at 266–268). See 18 U.S.C. § 3237(a):

Any offense involving the use of the mails … is a continuing offense and … may be … prosecuted in any district from, through, or into which such … mail matter … moves.

This was applied in United States v. Johnson, 323 U.S. 273, 275 (1944) so that “an illegal use of the mails … may subject the user to prosecution in the district where he sent the goods, or in the district of their arrival, or in any intervening district.”

=== Problems ===
This system works well when there is a clear line of demarcation between the two state jurisdictions, or between a state and federal jurisdictions, and prosecutions may be initiated in the appropriate court. But laws and rules are not always so clear.

==== Concurrent jurisdiction ====
Some crimes have national significance and, to reflect the public interest, their investigation and prosecution will fall to the Federal Bureau of Investigation or the Department of Justice. This creates tensions between the two systems because the individual states in which aspects of the criminal activity have taken place may wish to assert jurisdiction over that part, whereas the federal authorities will wish to consolidate the wrongdoing across several states into a single trial.

One significant result of the concurrent jurisdiction between state and federal courts (and in some cases between different state courts) is that an individual who violates both state and federal law, or the laws of multiple states, can be separately charged and tried in each jurisdiction. Thus, a resident of Virginia who defrauds a Florida resident through the mail may be tried in Virginia state court and in a Florida state court, and in a federal court in either Florida or Virginia. A famous example of dual state and federal sovereignty is the Rodney King case. Police officers who beat motorist Rodney King were acquitted of assault charges in the California state court, but were convicted of violating King's civil rights - based on the same events - in a federal court in California.
