= Element (criminal law) =

Fact that must be proven for a criminal conviction

In most common law jurisdictions, an element of a crime is one of a set of facts that must all be proven to convict a defendant of a crime. Before a court finds a defendant guilty of a criminal offense, the prosecution must present evidence that, even when opposed by any evidence the defense may choose, is credible and sufficient to prove beyond a reasonable doubt that the defendant committed each element of the particular crime charged. The component parts that make up any particular crime vary now depending on the crime.

The basic components of an offense are listed below; generally, each element of an offense falls into one or another of these categories. At common law, conduct could not be considered criminal unless a defendant possessed some level of intention – either purpose, knowledge, or recklessness – with regard to both the nature of his alleged conduct and the existence of the factual circumstances under which the law considered that conduct criminal. However, for some legislatively enacted crimes, the most notable example being statutory rape, a defendant need not have had any degree of belief or willful disregard as to the existence of certain factual circumstances (such as the age of the accuser) that rendered his conduct criminal; such crimes are known as strict liability offenses.

== Mental state (Mens rea) ==
Mens rea refers to the crime's mental elements of the defendant's intent. This is a necessary element—that is, the criminal act must be voluntary or purposeful. Mens rea is the mental intention (mental fault), or the defendant's state of mind at the time of the offense, sometimes called the guilty mind. It stems from the ancient maxim of obscure origin, "actus reus non facit reum nisi mens sit reas" that is translated as "the act is not guilty unless the mind is guilty." For example, the mens rea of aggravated battery is the intention to do serious bodily harm. Mens rea is almost always a necessary component in order to prove that a criminal act has been committed.

Mens rea varies depending on the offense. For murder, the mental element requires the defendant acted with "malice aforethought". Others may require proof the act was committed with such mental elements such as "knowingly" or "willfulness" or "recklessness". Arson requires an intent to commit a forbidden act, while others such as murder require an intent to produce a forbidden result. Motive, the reason the act was committed, is not the same as mens rea and the law is not concerned with motive.

Although most legal systems recognize the importance of the guilty mind or mens rea, exactly what is meant from this concept varies. The American Law Institute's Model Penal Code has reduced mental states to four. In general, guilt can be attributed to an individual who acts "purposely", "knowingly", "recklessly", or "negligently." Together or in combination, these four attributes seem basically effective in dealing with most of the common mens rea issues.

== Conduct (Actus reus) ==
All crimes require actus reus. That is, a criminal act or an unlawful omission of an act, must have occurred. A person cannot be punished for thinking criminal thoughts. This element is based on the problem of standards of proof. How can another person's thoughts be determined and how can criminal thoughts be differentiated from idle thoughts? Further, the law's purview is not to punish criminal ideas but to punish those who act upon those ideas voluntarily.

Unlike thoughts, words can be considered acts in criminal law. For example, threats, perjury, conspiracy, and solicitation are offenses in which words can constitute the element of actus reus.

The omission of an act can also constitute the basis for criminal liability.

== Concurrence ==
In general, mens rea and actus reus must occur at the same time—that is, the criminal intent must precede or coexist with the criminal act, or in some way activate the act. The necessary mens rea may not continually be present until the forbidden act is committed, as long as it activated the conduct that produced the criminal act. However, for criminal liability to occur, there must be either overt or voluntary action.

== Causation ==
Many crimes include an element that actual harm must occur—in other words, causation must be proved. For example, homicide requires killing, and aggravated battery requires serious bodily injury and without those respective outcomes, those respective crimes would not be committed. A causal relationship between conduct and result is demonstrated if the act would not have happened without the direct participation of the offender.

Causation is complex to prove. The act may be a "necessary but not sufficient" cause of criminal harm. Intervening events may have occurred between the act and the result. Therefore, the cause of the act and the forbidden result must be "proximate", or near in time.

== See also ==
- Criminal law
- Impossibility defense
- Corpus delicti
- Intentional tort, civil-law concepts that often involve elements to be proved.
