= Impossibility defense =

Criminal defense often used as a crime cannot be committed at all

An impossibility defense is a criminal defense occasionally used when a defendant is accused of a criminal attempt that failed only because the crime was factually or legally impossible to commit. Factual impossibility is rarely an adequate defense at common law. This is not to be confused with a "mistake of fact" defense, which may be a defense to a specific intent crime like larceny.

== Factual impossibility ==
An impossibility occurs when, at the time of the attempt, the facts make the intended crime impossible to commit although the defendant is unaware of this when the attempt is made. In People v. Lee Kong, the defendant was found guilty for attempted murder for shooting at a hole in the roof, believing his victim to be there, and indeed, where his victim had been only moments before but was not at the time of the shooting. Another case involving the defense of factual impossibility is Commonwealth v. Johnson, in which a psychic healer was charged and convicted of fraud, despite the fact that a fictitious name was used to catch him. In United States v. Thomas the court held that men who believed they were raping a drunken, unconscious woman were guilty of attempted rape, even though the woman was actually dead at the time sexual intercourse took place.

In Japan, the corresponding category is "不能犯" ("impossible crime"). A commonly used example is when someone attempts murder with ushi no toki mairi (a prescribed method of laying a curse upon a target). This would be a case of an impossible crime, and does not constitute attempted murder.

== Legal impossibility ==
An act that is considered legally impossible to commit is traditionally considered a valid defense for a person who was being prosecuted for a criminal attempt. An attempt is considered to be a legal impossibility when the defendant has completed all of his intended acts, but his acts fail to fulfil all the required in elements in a common law or statutory crime. The underlying rationale is that attempting to do what is not a crime is not attempting to commit a crime. One example of legal impossibility is a person who, thinking that Country 1 has banned the importation of lace from Country 2, attempts to smuggle some "banned" lace into Country 1. The actor believed that their act was a crime, and even fully intended to commit a crime. However, Country 1 does not, in fact, ban lace from Country 2. The traditional approach to understanding the legal impossibility defense is that the mistake (about the content of the law of Country 1) insulates the actor from a conviction for the crime of attempted smuggling. The legal impossibility may be thought of as reflecting that the actor had not satisfied the actus reus of the crime (because they had not actually brought a banned substance into the country). To put it another way, merely trying to commit a crime is insufficient to constitute a criminal attempt; for criminal liability to attach, the actor must be attempting to engage in behaviour that is actually criminal.

Legal impossibility can be distinguished from factual impossibility, which is not generally a defense at common law. Factual impossibility involves an error as to factual reality (the state of the world) that causes the actor to fail to commit a criminal offence when, if the circumstances were as the actor believed, the offence would have been committed. Legal impossibility involves an error as to a legal reality (the state of the law).

However, it is not always easy to identify whether an actor made a legal or a factual mistake. In State v. Guffey (1953), the defendant shot a stuffed deer, thinking it was alive, and was convicted for attempt to kill a protected animal out of season. In a highly debated reversal, an appellate judge threw out the conviction on the basis of legal impossibility, concluding that it is not a crime to shoot a stuffed deer out of season.

== See also ==
- People v. Dlugash
- DPP v Armstrong
