= State v. Christy Pontiac-GMC, Inc. =

Criminal case

State v. Christy Pontiac-GMC, Inc., Minnesota Supreme Court, 354 N.W.2d 17 (1984), is a criminal case in which it was held that "a corporation may be convicted of theft and forgery, which are crimes requiring specific intent".
