= United States v. Thomas (1962) =

13 U.S.C.M.A. 278, on the impossibility defense

United States v. Thomas 13 U.S.C.M.A. 278 (1962) is a famous case of a military court-martial involving a failed attempt to commit a crime, in this case, rape and the use of the "impossibility" defense.

== Circumstances ==
Two enlisted military men, Thomas and McClellan, were spending an evening drinking in bars. In one bar McClellan began dancing with a young woman who was drunk and soon collapsed in his arms on the dance floor. The defendants put the woman in McClellan's car, having agreed at the bar to take her home. Once in the car McClellan, suggested they rape her, as she was unconscious and would not know the difference. Each defendant then proceeded to have sexual intercourse with the woman. They were unable to find the location of her home, and she had not regained consciousness, so they sought help at a service station. The service station attendant called the police, who determined she was dead. An autopsy conducted later ascertained that she died of a heart condition, "acute interstitial myocarditis". The general undisputed opinion was that her death most likely occurred at the time of her collapse. The two defendants were not aware of her death.

The defendants used the "impossibility" defense, claiming that it was legally impossible to attempt to rape a woman who was dead.

== Decisions ==
The United States Court of Appeals for the Armed Forces held that when a defendant is attempting to commit a criminal act, it is not a defense that facts unknown to the defendant made the actual completion of the crime impossible. The defendants believed that the young woman was alive and had not consented to have sex. Because the men believed they were raping a drunken, unconscious woman, they were guilty of attempted rape even though the woman was actually dead at the time sexual intercourse took place.

== Significance ==
This case contributes to the body of case law involving impossibility. In this case the crime was impossible to commit, unbeknown to the defendants. The crime of attempt consists of a specific intent to commit an offense and in addition some action that is more than just preparation. The fact the crime was not possible to commit does not constitute a defense.

== See also ==
- State v. Mitchell
- People v. Lee Kong
