= Attendant circumstance =

In law, the facts surrounding an event

In law, attendant circumstances (sometimes external circumstances) are the facts surrounding an event.

In criminal law in the United States, the definition of a given offense generally includes up to three kinds of "elements": the actus reus, or guilty conduct; the mens rea, or guilty mental state; and the attendant (sometimes "external") circumstances. The reason is given in Powell v. Texas, 392 U.S. 514, 533 (1968):

...criminal penalties may be inflicted only if the accused has committed some act, has engaged in some behavior, which society has an interest in preventing.

The burden of proof is on the prosecution to prove each "element of the offense" in order for a defendant to be found guilty. The Model Penal Code §1.13(9) offers the following definition of the phrase "elements of an offense":

(i) such conduct or (ii) such attendant circumstances or (iii) such a result of conduct as

(a) is included in the description of the forbidden conduct in the definition of the offense; or
(b) establishes the required kind of culpability; or
(c) negatives an excuse or justification for such conduct; or
(d) negatives a defense under the statute of limitations; or
(e) establishes jurisdiction or venue;

== Discussion ==
=== MPC §1.13(9)(a)/(c) ===
In United States v. Apfelbaum, 445 U.S. 115, 131 (1980), Justice Rehnquist states, in his opinion for the Court, the general rule that:

In the criminal law, both a culpable mens rea and a criminal actus reus are generally required for an offense to occur.

For these purposes, the term "actus reus" does not have a single definition, but it represents the general principle that before an individual may be convicted of an offense, it must be shown that there was an overt act in pursuance of any intention. Otherwise, a person might be held liable for his or her thoughts alone. Model Penal Code §2.01(1):

A person is not guilty of an offense unless his liability is based on conduct which includes a voluntary act or the omission to perform an act of which he is physically capable.

But there are exceptions. For example, according to United States v. Dozal, 173 F.3d 787, 797 (10th Cir. 1999) a conspiracy in violation of 21 U.S.C. §846 consists of four elements:

1. an agreement with another person to violate the law,
2. knowledge of the essential objectives of the conspiracy,
3. knowing and voluntary involvement, and
4. interdependence among the alleged conspirators.

But, according to United States v. Johnson, 42 F.3d 1312, 1319 (10th Cir. 1994) (citing United States v. Shabani, 513 U.S. 10 (1994)) drug conspiracies under 21 U.S.C. §846 are unique because the prosecution need not prove an overt act. Instead, the government must "prove that the defendant knew at least the essential objectives of the conspiracy and knowingly and voluntarily became a part of it." Consequently, withdrawal before an overt act has been committed cannot relieve a defendant of criminal responsibility. When analysing an offense, the normal rules of interpretation require the identification of the policies that informed the creation of the offense, an assessment of the factual context within which the offense must be committed and the consequences prohibited by the law. Thus, as the MPC §1.13(9) definition indicates, the attendant circumstances will be the evidence that must be adduced to prove all the elements required to constitute the offense and, under §1.13(9)(c) to disprove any excuse or justification. So, as in State of North Carolina v Vernon Jay Raley 155 NC App 222 (01-1004), if a citizen intentionally utters a profanity at the police, the charges would be preferred under N.C.G.S. §14-288.4 which defines "disorderly conduct" as:

a public disturbance intentionally caused by a person who:

(1) Engages in fighting or other violent conduct or in conduct creating the threat of imminent fighting or violence; or
(2) makes or uses any utterance, gesture, display or abusive language which is intended and plainly likely to provoke violent retaliation and thereby causes a breach of the peace.

Under N.C.G.S. §14-288.4 (2001), the componential element of "public disturbance" is defined in G.S. §14-288.1(8) as follows:

Any annoying, disturbing, or alarming act or condition exceeding the bounds of social toleration normal for the time and place in question which occurs in a public place or which occurs in, affects persons in, or is likely to affect persons in a place to which the public or a substantial group has access. The places covered by this definition shall include, but not be limited to, highways, transport facilities, schools, prisons, apartment houses, places of business or amusement, or any neighborhood.

In order for a person to be found guilty of this crime, the evidence must prove that the defendant uttered a profanity (the act) in a public place (the contextual attendant circumstance) with the intention of provoking a violent reaction (the mental element demonstrating the right type of culpability) and thereby causes a breach of the peace (the result prohibited by law). There are no attendant circumstances that might invoke an excuse or other general defence. Indeed, the victim in this instance being a police officer would probably be considered an aggravating circumstance and increase the penalty for the crime. (When verification of an attendant circumstance decreases the penalty, it is known as a mitigating or extenuating circumstance.)

=== MPC §1.13(9)(d)/(e) ===
The elements of a crime may also require proof of attendant circumstances that bring the conduct within time for the purposes of any statute of limitation or before an appropriate venue. Such circumstances are completely independent from the actus reus or mens rea elements. In the federal system, for example, a crime may require proof of jurisdictional facts, which are not defined in the statute creating the offense. See generally LaFave & Scott at 273.3. Thus, the Sixth Amendment calls for trial "by an impartial jury of the State and district wherein the crime shall have been committed." Within the federal court system, Rule 18 of the Federal Rules of Criminal Procedure specifies which federal court may hear a particular criminal case:

Unless a statute or these rules permit otherwise, the government must prosecute an offense in a district where the offense was committed. The court must set the place of trial within the district with due regard for the convenience of the defendant and the witnesses, and the prompt administration of justice.

In United States v. Cabrales, 118 S. Ct. 1772 (1998) a jurisdiction issue on venue was invoked by the attendant circumstance that the relevant acts of money laundering occurred in Florida where the case was to be tried, but the funds were derived from the unlawful distribution of cocaine in Missouri. The offense is defined as:

Whoever, knowing that the property involved in a financial transaction represents the proceeds of some form of unlawful activity, conducts or attempts to conduct such a financial transaction which involves the proceeds of specified unlawful activity—
(A)(i) with the intent to promote the carrying on of specified unlawful activity; or

(ii) with intent to engage in conduct constituting a violation of section 7201 or 7206 of the Internal Revenue Code of 1986; or

(B) knowing that the transaction is designed in whole or in part—

(i) to conceal or disguise the nature, the location, the source, the ownership, or the control of the proceeds of specified unlawful activity; or
(ii) to avoid a transaction reporting requirement under State or Federal law,

shall be sentenced to a fine of not more than $500,000 or twice the value of the property involved in the transaction, whichever is greater, or imprisonment for not more than twenty years, or both.

The attendant circumstance of a transborder exercise is not referred to in the definition, but is a critical factual circumstance which will determine whether the accused can be tried as charged. The case was held more properly within the Missouri jurisdiction. This jurisdictional problem would not arise in relation to conspiracy charges.

== See also ==
- Extenuating circumstances
