= Velleity =

Lowest degree of volition

Velleity is the lowest degree of volition, a slight wish or tendency. It is a concept that has been used in philosophy and, to a lesser degree, religion, psychology, and ethics.

== Examples of usage ==
=== In philosophy ===
The 16th-century French philosopher Montaigne, in his essay On the Force of Imagination begins with the epigraph he cites from a schoolboy textbook, Fortis imaginatio generat casum, or "A strong imagination begets the event itself." In this essay, Montaigne describes the various ways that the will (or imagination as he calls it) causes people and other animals to do things or to have things done to them, with the barest of initiatives. In said essay, he links (what is now called) the placebo effect to the power of the will. For example, he describes how a certain Germain, once born a female named Mary, who "that by straining himself in a leap his male organs came out" at the age of 22. He also cites the stigmata of Dagobert and Saint Francis, and when the bride Laodice worshipping Venus cured her husband Amasis, King of Egypt of his impotence, among several other examples.

Friedrich Nietzsche describes the velleity of an artist as a "desire to be 'what he is able to represent, conceive, and express'...."

Ogden Nash named "velleity is what I've got!" as what turns "varying commitment into vanishing commitment."

=== In religion ===
In the Kabbalah, the number of Ratzon is 1/60 of perfection, which is the minimum level of the Divine will.

Thomas Aquinas introduced the concept into Christian ethics. He posited that human thought must use a possibility to act, rather than an impossibility. Furthermore, command is a necessary but not sufficient requirement for an act: "An imperfect [that is, ineffective] command occurs when reason is moved by opposing motives ...." In this system of ethics, "velleity is a constant aspect of Thomas' teaching," and God wants to save the reprobate, which is impossible for humans but possible for God. However, as in the case of suicide, or any other sin, "the natural willing is an act of simple willing and that such an act is not the same as intention."

== See also ==
- Attenuation
- Intention (criminal law)
- Quantum
