= Motive (law) =

Reason for performing an action

A motive is the cause that moves a person to induce a certain action. In criminal law, motive in itself is not an element of any given crime; however, the legal system typically allows motive to be proven to make plausible the accused's reasons for committing a crime, at least when those motives may be obscure or hard to identify with. However, a motive is not required to reach a verdict. Motives are also used in other aspects of a specific case, for instance, when police are initially investigating.

The law technically distinguishes between motive and intent. "Intent" in criminal law is synonymous with mens rea ('guilty mind'), which means the mental state shows liability which is enforced by law as an element of a crime. "Motive" describes instead the reasons in the accused's background and station in life that are supposed to have induced the crime. Motives are often broken down into three categories: biological, social and personal.

== Objections ==
There are two objections to motive when considering punishment. The first is volitional objection, which is the argument that the person cannot manage their own motives and therefore cannot be punished for them. The second objection is neutrality objection. This is based on the idea that our society has contrasting political opinions and therefore a government's preference should be limited.

== Pertinence ==
There are four different ways a defendant's motive can be pertinent to their criminal liability. Motive can be fully inculpatory or exculpatory or only partially inculpatory or exculpatory. When one has acted with a specific motive, lawful behavior becomes illegal, and this is when motive is fully inculpatory. If illegal activity with a particular motive does not hold a defendant responsible then that motive is fully exculpatory. When a motive supplies inadequate defense to a crime, the motive is partially exculpatory. When a motive says the kind of infraction for which the defendant is responsible, the motive is partially inculpatory.

== See also ==
- Means, motive, and opportunity
