= Commonwealth v. O'Malley =

Commonwealth v. O'Malley, 97 Mass. 584 (1867), was a case decided by the Supreme Court of Massachusetts that overturned a conviction for embezzlement because the evidence supported a case for larceny, even though the defendant had previously been acquitted of larceny. The case illustrates the problem of gaps in similar common law offenses with technical differences, and this problem was later addressed by consolidation of the common law offenses in things like the Model Penal Code.
