= Rex v. Scofield =

1784 British criminal law case

Rex v. Scofield (1784)
- Court: Not specified
- Decided: 1784
- Defendant: Scofield
- Plaintiff: Not specified
- Citation: Cald. 397

Case history
- Subsequent actions: The case involved Scofield placing a lit candle into flammable material in a house with the intent to burn it down, but the larger fire never happened. Lord Mansfield held that the incomplete but intended act of arson constituted a crime, emphasizing that "The intent may make an act, innocent in itself, criminal..."

Court membership
- Judge sitting: Lord Mansfield

Case opinions
- The case introduced the concept of attempt in common law, focusing on the intent of the actor rather than the completion of the criminal act.

Rex v. Scofield, Cald. 397 (1784), is a British criminal law case that made attempt part of the common law, emphasizing the intent of an actor over the incomplete criminal act. Scofield lit a candle and placed it into flammable material in a house with the intent to burn it down, but the larger fire never happened. Finding crime in the incomplete but intended act of arson, Lord Mansfield held that "completion of an act, criminal in itself, [was not] necessary to constitute criminality", and "The intent may make an act, innocent in itself, criminal..."
