= Grade (crime) =

Classification of a crime by its severity

The grade of a crime is its ranking or classification by its degree or seriousness or severity. A felony is more serious than a misdemeanor, which is more serious than an infraction. A first degree felony is more serious than a second degree felony. The severity of punishment is based on the grade of the crime.

== See also ==
- Contravention
- Federal crime in the United States
- Felony
- Indictable offence
- Misdemeanor
- Summary offence
- Regulatory offence
