= State v. Ochoa =

State v. Ochoa, Supreme Court of New Mexico, 41 N.M. 589, 72 P.2d 609 (1937), is a criminal case involving acting in complicity, or acting as accessory.
