= Legal impossibility =

Defense stating an act cannot be a crime if completed

Legal impossibility is a traditional common law defense to a charge of an attempted crime. Legal impossibility arises when the act, if completed, would not be a crime. A person believes they are committing a crime, but the act is, in fact, lawful. For example, a person may believe they are receiving stolen goods, but the goods are in fact not stolen.

A different form of legal impossibility (known as "hybrid legal impossibility") comes into play when an actor's goal is illegal, but commission of the crime is impossible due to a factual mistake regarding the legal status of one of the attendant circumstances of one of the elements of the crime. For example, a man attempting to bribe someone whom he mistakenly believes is a juror is not liable for attempted bribery of a juror. On the other hand, some jurisdictions may find the actor guilty of attempt.

The Model Penal Code did away with the legal impossibility defense. Under the MPC, a defendant is guilty of an attempt to commit a crime if they purposely engage in conduct which would constitute the object crime if the attendant circumstances were as they believed them to be.

In the Revised Penal Code of the Philippines, an "impossible crime" is an actual crime that can either lead to incarceration or fines.
