= Solicitation =

Inducing another person to commit a crime

Solicitation is the act of offering, or attempting to purchase, goods and/or services. Legal status may be specific to the time or place where it occurs. The crime of "solicitation to commit a crime" occurs when a person encourages, "solicits, requests, commands, importunes or otherwise attempts to cause" another person to attempt or commit a crime, with the purpose of thereby facilitating the attempt or commission of that crime.

== England and Wales ==
In England and Wales, the term soliciting is usually "for a person (whether male or female) persistently to loiter or solicit in a street or public place for the purpose of prostitution" under the Street Offences Act 1959 as amended. The crime of soliciting should not be confused with the profession of a solicitor, which under UK law is typically that of a lawyer, who may also function as a legal agent to obtain the services of a barrister on behalf of a client.

== United States ==
In the United States, solicitation is the name of a crime, an inchoate offense that consists of a person offering money or inducing another to commit a crime with the specific intent that the person solicited commit the crime. For example, under federal law, for a solicitation conviction to occur the prosecution must prove both that defendant had the intent that another person engage in conduct constituting a felony crime of violence, and that the defendant commanded, induced, or otherwise endeavored to persuade the other person to commit the felony.

In some jurisdictions in the United States, solicitation of prostitution is subject to occasional police sting operations, which have been in turn subject to court cases on privacy grounds.

=== Differences in laws ===
In the United States, the term "solicitation" implies some part of commercial element, consideration, or payment. In some other common law countries, the situation is different:

- where the substantive offense is not committed, the charges are drawn from incitement, conspiracy, and attempt;
- where the substantive offense is committed, the charges are drawn from conspiracy, counseling and procuring (see accessories), and the substantive offenses as joint principals (see common purpose).

=== Differences from other crimes ===
Solicitation has in the U.S. these unique elements:

1. the encouraging, bribing, requesting, or commanding a person
2. to commit a substantive crime,
3. with the intent that the person solicited commit the crime.

Unlike conspiracy, there is no overt step necessary for solicitation, one person can be a defendant and it merges with the substantive crime.

It is not necessary that the person commit the crime, nor is it necessary that the person solicited be willing or able to commit the crime (such as if the "solicitee" were an undercover police officer).

For example, if Alice commands Bob to assault Charlie, and Alice intends for Bob to assault Charlie, then Alice is guilty of solicitation. However, if Alice commands Bob to assault Charlie without intending that a crime be committed (perhaps believing that Charlie has given consent), then there is no solicitation.

An interesting twist on solicitation occurs when a third party that the solicitor did not intend to receive the incitement overhears the request to the original solicitee and unbeknownst to the solicitor, commits the target offense. In a minority of jurisdictions in the United States, this situation would still be considered solicitation even though the defendant never intended the person that committed the crime to have done so.

Solicitation is also subject to the doctrine of merger, which applies in situations where the person solicited commits the crime. In such a situation, both Alice and Bob could be charged with the crime as accomplices, which would preclude conviction under solicitation; a person cannot be punished for both solicitation and the crime solicited.

=== No soliciting signs – residential ===
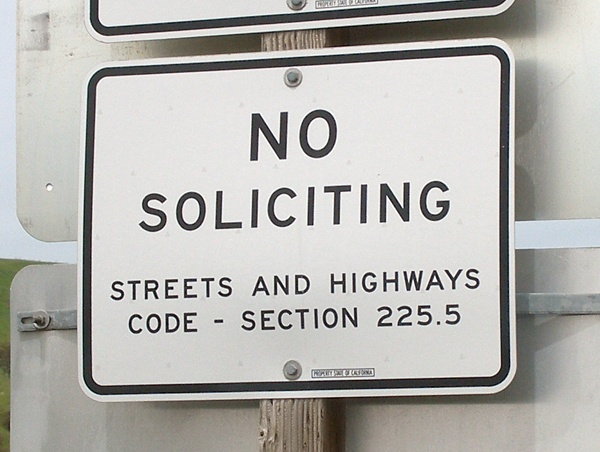
A "No Soliciting" sign at the Camp Roberts Safety Roadside Rest Area on the northbound side of en:U.S. Route 101 near Bradley, California

In addition to the inchoate offense of solicitation, "solicitor" can also refer to a door-to-door salesman. This creates another form of illegal solicitation, as in a number of jurisdictions, it is illegal to ignore "no soliciting" signs with the burden typically resting upon the solicitor to look for the sign and upon observation to vacate the premises without attempting to contact the homeowner. Some cities require the employer to properly train employees on the appropriate observation of local solicitation ordinances and instruct them to always carry an identifying badge that they must show upon request.

City ordinances vary but may require a soliciting sign to be of a certain dimension to qualify for legal protection. Some signs may cite the city ordinance and describe the consequences to the solicitor. Although certainly not required, such methods may be more effective at deterring unwanted solicitation.

== See also ==
- Begging § Legal restrictions
- Incitement
- Inchoate offence
- Murder for hire
- Prostitution
- Soliciting to murder
- ATF fictional sting operations – rejected US legal case justified by Department of Justice as preventing crime
- Crimen sollicitationis in Catholic Church

=== Related to "no soliciting" signs ===
- Spamming
- Flyposting
- Email spam
