= People v. Lee Kong =

People v. Lee Kong (1892) case

- Supreme Court of California

Decided August 22, 1892
- Full case name: The People, Respondent, v. Charlie Lee Kong, Appellant.
- Citation(s): 95 Cal. 666; 30 P. 800

Holding
- A defendant who fires a shot at another person, but misses due to mistaking the target's location, is still guilty of a criminal charge of assault. Judgement affirmed.

Court membership
- Chief Justice: William H. Beatty
- Associate Justices: John Sharpstein, Van R. Paterson, Charles N. Fox, John J. De Haven, Charles H. Garoute, Ralph C. Harrison

Case opinions
- Majority: Garoute, joined by Paterson
- Concurrence: Harrison

People v. Lee Kong, 95 Cal. 666 (1892), was a decision of the Supreme Court of California in which the defendant claimed the "impossibility" defense to charges of assault, on the basis of a mistake in fact. The ultimate issue in this case is whether the defendant's actions and intent warrant criminal sanctions even though he failed to achieve a criminal act because the act itself was factually impossible to commit.

== Circumstances ==
A policeman cut a hole through the roof of Lee Kong's building in order to observe Kong gamble. Kong, knowing of the hole, fired his gun through the hole in the roof at the spot where he thought a policeman was located. Because the officer had moved from that spot to another, the shot did not hit him. Kong claimed that since he was mistaken in fact, it was impossible for him to commit the crime. Kong was convicted and appealed to the California Supreme Court.

== Decision ==
The California Supreme Court stated that the exact location of the policeman, as long as he was in range of being shot by the defendant "does not go to the question of present ability." Since the defendant had the intention and present ability to commit the assault, the fact that he was mistaken as to the location of the intended victim affords no defense for his act. Therefore Kong's conviction was upheld.

== Significance ==
This is one of the first in a series of cases that imposed liability for an attempted felony even though the crime was impossible to commit because the defendant was mistaken in fact. It was reinforced by decisions that followed such as that used later in State v. Mitchell (Mo., 1902) and United States v. Thomas (U.S.C.M.A, 1962).

== See also ==
- Impossibility defense
