= Attempted murder =

Crime of attempt in various jurisdictions

Attempted murder is a crime of attempt in various jurisdictions.

== Canada ==
Section 239 of the Criminal Code makes attempted murder punishable by a maximum of life imprisonment. If a gun is used, the minimum sentence is four, five or seven years, dependent on prior convictions and relation to organized crime.

== United Kingdom ==
=== England and Wales ===
In English criminal law, attempted murder is the crime of simultaneously preparing to commit an unlawful killing and having a specific intention to cause the death of a human being under the King's Peace. The phrase "more than merely preparatory" is specified by the Criminal Attempts Act 1981 to denote the fact that preparation for a crime by itself does not constitute an "attempted crime".

In England and Wales, as an "attempt", attempted murder is an offence under section 1(1) of the Criminal Attempts Act 1981 and is an indictable offence which carries a maximum penalty of life imprisonment (the same as the mandatory sentence for murder). The corresponding legislation for Northern Ireland is section 3(1) of the Criminal Attempts and Conspiracy (Northern Ireland) Order 1983 (No.1120 (N.I.13)).

The mens rea (Latin for the "guilty mind") for murder is an intention to kill or cause grievous bodily harm, whereas attempted murder depends on an intention to kill and an overt act towards committing homicide. Attempted murder is only the planning of a murder and acts taken towards it, not the actual killing, which is the murder. This makes the offence very difficult to prove and it is more common for a lesser charge to be preferred under the Offences against the Person Act 1861.

However, in R v Morrison [2003] 1 WLR 1859, the Court of Appeal considered the issue of alternative verdicts on an indictment with a single count of attempted murder. Morrison had gone into a shop with two other men on a robbery with a firearm. They demanded money and one of the men shot at the shopkeeper who suffered only minor injury. The prosecution had many opportunities to add other counts before the trial but failed to act. Having heard the case, the judge expressed his view that the jury could consider an attempted grievous bodily harm (GBH) under section 18 of the 1861 Act and Morrison was duly convicted of attempting to cause grievous bodily harm. The Court of Appeal confirmed that attempting to cause grievous bodily harm is a valid alternative to attempted murder because there can be no intention to kill someone without the intention also to cause grievous bodily harm.

This is a practical decision to ensure that the criminal justice system did not allow a guilty person to walk away because only one charge had been preferred. But it is not necessarily a good general principle because, in euthanasia for example, a person assisting intends to cause death, but with no suffering. That attempting to cause grievous bodily harm must be an alternative verdict should the intended victim not die would be a strange outcome because there is no intention to cause any long-lasting and serious injury: the two attempted offences have different mens rea requirements so that proof of intent to murder would not necessarily meet the requirement for section 18 of the 1861 Act.

First, acting deliberately and intentionally or recklessly with extreme disregard for human life, the person attempted to kill someone; and the person did something that was a substantial step toward committing the crime. Mere preparation is not considered a substantial step toward committing a crime.

==== Proof of mens rea ====
There must be more than merely preparatory acts and, although the defendant may threaten death, this may not provide convincing evidence of an intention to kill unless the words are accompanied by relevant action, e.g. finding and picking up a weapon and making serious use of it, or making a serious and sustained physical attack without a weapon.

==== Duress, necessity and marital coercion ====
The defences of duress and necessity are not available to a person charged with attempted murder. Conversely, the statutory defence of marital coercion is, on the face of the statute, available to a wife charged with attempted murder.

==== History ====
Prior to 1967, sections 11 to 15 of the Offences against the Person Act 1861 created a number of offences of attempting to commit murder by various specified means (ss.11 to 14), and an offence of attempting to commit murder by any means not specified in those offences (s.15).

After the repeal of these offences by the Criminal Law Act 1967, attempted murder was allowed to subsist at common law until the enactment of the 1981 Act.

=== Scotland ===
Attempted murder is a crime at common law in Scotland. Attempted murder is the same as the offence of murder in Scots law with the only difference being that the victim has not died. The offence of murder was defined in Drury v HM Advocate:

[M]urder is constituted by any wilful act causing the destruction of life, by which the perpetrator either wickedly intends to kill or displays wicked recklessness as to whether the victim lives or dies.

Intention can be inferred from the circumstances of the case. Wicked recklessness is determined objectively and is "recklessness so gross that it indicates a state of mind which falls to be treated as wicked and depraved as the state of mind of a deliberate killer." As with all common law offences in Scotland, the maximum punishment available is life imprisonment.

== See also ==
- Death threat
- People v. Superior Court (Decker)
- State v. Mitchell
