= Attempt =

Having an intent for and preparing to complete a crime

An attempt to commit a crime occurs if a criminal has an intent to commit a crime and takes a substantial step toward completing the crime, but for reasons not intended by the criminal, the final resulting crime does not occur. Attempt to commit a particular crime is a crime, usually considered to be of the same or lesser gravity as the particular crime attempted. Attempt is a type of inchoate crime, a crime that is not fully developed. The crime of attempt has two elements, intent and some conduct toward completion of the crime.

One group of theories in criminal law is that attempt to commit an act occurs when a person comes dangerously close to carrying out a criminal act, and intends to commit the act, but does not commit it. The person may have carried out all the necessary steps (or thought they had) but still failed, or the attempt may have been abandoned or prevented at a late stage. The attempt must have gone beyond mere planning or preparation, and is distinct from other inchoate offenses such as conspiracy to commit a crime or solicitation of a crime. There are many specific crimes of attempt, such as attempted murder, which may vary by jurisdiction. Punishment is often less severe than would be the case if the attempted crime had been carried out. Abandonment of the attempt may constitute a not guilty defence, depending partly on the extent to which the attempt was abandoned freely and voluntarily. Early common law did not punish attempts; the law of attempt was not recognised by common law until the case of Rex v. Scofield in 1784.

The essence of the crime of attempt in legal terms is that the defendant has failed to commit the actus reus (the Latin term for the "guilty act") of the full offense, but has the direct and specific intent to commit that full offense. The normal rule for establishing criminal liability is to prove an actus reus accompanied by a mens rea ("guilty mind") at the relevant time (see concurrence and strict liability offenses as the exception to the rule).

== The actus reus (guilty act) of attempted crime ==
Whether the actus reus of an attempt has occurred is a question of fact for the jury to decide after having heard the judge's instructions regarding the law. The common law precedent is used to distinguish between acts that were merely preparatory and those sufficiently proximate or connected to the crime. However, sometimes it is hard to draw the line between those acts which were merely preparatory, and those involved in executing a plan. Would-be criminals will always go through a series of steps to arrive at the intended conclusion. Some aspects of the execution of the act will be too remote or removed from the full offense. Examples are watching the intended victim over a period of time to establish the routines and traveling to a store to buy necessary tools and equipment. But the closer to the reality of committing the offense the potential wrongdoer moves, the greater the social danger they become. This is a critical issue for the police who need to know when they can intervene to avert the threatened harm by arresting the person. This is a difficult policy area. On the one hand, the state wishes to be able to protect its citizens from harm. This requires an arrest at the earliest possible time. But, most states recognise a principle of individual liberty that only those people who actually choose to break the law should be arrested. Since the potential wrongdoer could change their mind at any point before the crime is committed, the state should wait until the last possible minute to ensure that the intention is going to be realized.

=== England and Wales ===
In English law, an attempt is defined as 'doing an act which is more than merely preparatory to the commission of the offence' according to the Criminal Attempts Act 1981. "The test of proximity was that the defendant must have ... crossed the rubicon, burnt his boats, or reached a point of no return". So the defendant has reached that part of the series of acts, which if not interrupted, frustrated, or abandoned, would inevitably result in the commission of the intended offence. But section 1(1) of the Criminal Attempts Act 1981 defines the actus reus as that is "...more than merely preparatory to the commission of the offence," that allowed liability to attach slightly earlier in the sequence of acts. Subsequent ratio decidendi have abandoned the more formal common law last step test, leaving it to the jury to decide. A defendant who changes their mind after the act is sufficiently proximate, is still guilty of an attempt although the change of heart could be reflected in the sentencing.

However, there is some uncertainty as to what exactly 'more than merely preparatory' means. It is upon the discretion of the judges and the jury to decide. Major criticism was attracted after the judgement in R v Geddes, where the court acquitted the defendant who was trying to kidnap a young boy, stating that he had not gone far enough, and his acts were 'merely preparatory'.

=== United States ===
The legal rules for establishing the actus reus of an attempt offense in the United States are varied and nonuniform. Generally, there are two categories which a test can fall under: tests that focus on how much remains to be done before the crime is committed; and those that consider what has already occurred. Further complicating matters, U.S. jurisdictions rarely use only one test.

==== New York State ====
In New York law, the element of actus reus is that the person engages in conduct that "tends to effect the commission of such crime". The test this requires either:

- An action that reveals a criminal intent, that is, res ipsa loquitur, or "the thing speaks for itself", or
- The person has dangerous proximity, or is "dangerously near and close to the accomplishment of the crime".

The dangerous proximity test was formulated by Justice Oliver Wendell Holmes in the trial of Commonwealth [of Massachusetts] v. Peaslee in 1901. Holmes as a U.S. Supreme Court justice later articulated the test as "dangerous proximity to success" of the crime in a dissent in Hyde v. United States (1912).

==== U.S. Model Penal Code ====
Under the United States Model Penal Code, for a defendant to be convicted of attempt requires that they perform a "substantial step in a course of conduct planned to culminate in [the defendant's] commission of the crime" (MPC 5.01(1)(c)).

== The question of impossibility ==
There is a distinction between factual impossibility and legal impossibility. Factual impossibility is rarely a defense. A standard policing strategy is the use of an agent provocateur to offer temptation to suspected criminals. In some countries, evidence resulting from entrapment is inadmissible. Nevertheless, undercover police officers do sell real or fake contraband such as illegal drugs or guns, as a means of exposing criminal activity. Some consider the use of fake material as a slightly safer way to catch criminals, rather than risk the real contraband falling into the wrong hands. But if there is no actual contraband and the actus reus of the full offense is "possession" of prohibited materials, there can be no criminal possession. Can there be an attempt to possess when, in the circumstances, it was impossible to follow through to commit the full offense? The answer is that mistakes of fact are almost never a defense, as in People v. Lee Kong, and State v. Mitchell, for example.

=== England and Wales ===
Section 1(2) of the Criminal Attempts Act 1981 applies the Act even though the facts are such that the commission of the offence is impossible so long as, under section 1(3), the defendant believes that he is about to break the law and intends to commit the relevant full offence. This reverses the House of Lords' decision in Haughton v Smith, which had held it to be a good defence if the intended crime was factually or legally incapable of fulfillment. This change in the law avoids any problem in an early arrest because, once in police custody, it is extraordinarily difficult to commit the full offence. Further, both the incompetent criminal who fails because the means adopted are inadequate (e.g. intends to poison a victim but the amount administered is harmless, or makes a false statement that does not deceive the intended victim) and the unlucky thief who find the pocket or purse empty, can now be convicted.

== The mens rea of attempted crime ==
Intent is the essence of attempt. Only a direct and specific intent will support a conviction.

Recklessness is not a sufficient mens rea. That means that the defendant must have decided to bring about, so far as lay within their powers, the commission of the full offense. However, transferred intent applies so that if Alice intends to murder Bob with a gun, but the shot accidentally misses and kills Carol, then Alice is guilty of the murder of Carol and the attempted murder of Bob. Alternatively, if Alice intends merely to frighten Bob, and that same shot intentionally misses Bob but accidentally kills Carol, Alice may be guilty of assaulting Bob (among other things), but not attempted murder, unless Alice intended that such fright would kill Bob. Whether Alice would be guilty of murdering Carol would depend on the specific circumstances and what Alice foresaw. The punishment for an attempt is often tied to that of the intended offense (e.g., half the fine, or half the prison time).

Recklessness will sometimes suffice for 'circumstances' of the crime. To be liable for attempted rape a defendant need not actually intend to have non-consensual intercourse, mere recklessness towards the lack of consent is enough (R v Khan). Likewise with attempted aggravated arson, recklessness towards loss of life will suffice (A-G's Reference #3 1992).

=== England ===
Under English law, R v Walker and Hayles (1990) 90 Cr. App. R. 226 deals with the issue of the power of a court to impute intention based on foresight. The defendants threw their victim from a third floor balcony and were charged with attempted murder. The judge directed the jury that they could infer intention if there was a high degree of probability that the victim would be killed and if the defendants knew "quite well that in doing that there was a high degree of probability" that the victim would be killed. The Court of Appeal did not accept that the reference to "very high degree of probability" was a misdirection, but Lloyd LJ. stated that in the rare cases where an expanded direction is required to include foresight, courts should use virtual certainty as the test, rather than high probability (see also R v Woollin [1998] 3 WLR 382 (HL)).

=== United States ===
Generally, the rule in the United States for the mens rea of an attempt offense is divided into two parts: (1) the actor must intend to commit the act that constitutes the actus reus of an attempt; and (2) the actor must perform that act with the specific intention of committing the target crime.

In many states in the United States, it is impossible, as a matter of law, to attempt to commit a crime whose underlying mens rea is only recklessness. For example, in State v. Lyerla, the defendant Lyerla randomly shot into a truck 3 times after being goaded by the driver of the truck. One shot killed the driver and the others did not hit the driver or either of 2 passengers. The South Dakota Supreme Court found that although Lyerla was guilty of reckless second degree murder of the driver, he could not be guilty of recklessly attempting to murder the passengers, because attempt requires a higher level of intent than recklessness. Further, the overwhelming rule in the United States is that no one can be convicted of attempted involuntary manslaughter because that offense is based on the mens rea of criminal negligence or recklessness.

==== Model Penal Code ====
Model Penal Code Section 5.01 defines criminal attempt to commit a crime as occurring when a defendant acts with the culpability required to commit that crime, and either

(1) purposely engages in conduct that would be a commission of the crime if the attendant circumstances were as defendant believed them to be, or
(2) purposely acts (or omits to act) with purpose of causing (or belief that the act will cause) a result that is an element of the crime and that no further act by defendant is needed, or
(3) purposely acts (or omits to act) when that act (or omission) constitutes a substantial step in a planned course of conduct that ends in her commission of the crime, if attendant circumstances were as she believed them to be.

The "purpose" (as in situation 1) or "belief" (as in situation 2) required for an attempt do not necessarily encompass the attendant circumstances of the crime. Instead, the defendant must possess as to the attendant circumstances the degree of culpability required to commit the target offense, as specified in the elements of that offense.

===== Grading =====
Model Penal Code §5.05 on grading criminal attempt says, "Except as otherwise provided, attempt... [is a crime] of the same grade and degree as the most serious offense that is attempted... An attempt... to commit a [capital crime or a] felony of the first degree is a felony of the second degree.

== No attempt ==
It is not possible to attempt the other inchoate offenses of conspiracy, or aiding, abetting, counseling or procuring an offense because the defendant would be too remote from the full offense. Similarly, there can be no attempt where the mens rea for the full offense is criminal negligence since, by definition, there is insufficient intention to commit the full offense. Hence, there can be no charge of attempted involuntary manslaughter. It may, however, be possible to prove an attempted omission since all the preparatory steps are presumably commissive in building up to the situation in which the defendant will fail to act.

== Abandonment ==
Abandonment can also be a defense to either element (mens rea or actus reus) of attempt, if the defendant "walks away" from the crime. However, many jurisdictions do not recognize abandonment. Courts that do recognize this defense generally apply it only where the defendant completely and voluntarily renounces any criminal purpose. However, the abandonment is not complete and voluntary where the defendant desists from criminal efforts due to unexpected resistance (e.g., from victims), the discovery of the absence of an instrumentality needed for the completion of the offense, or other circumstances that increase the probability of arrest, or decrease the probability of successful completion of the crime (e.g. proximate arrival of police). Abandonment is also invalid where the defendant simply postpones the criminal plan until another time.

Under the Model Penal Code, the defendant is not guilty of an attempt if they (1) abandon the effort to commit the crime or prevent the crime from being committed, and (2) their behavior manifests a complete and voluntary renunciation of the criminal purpose (MPC § 5.01(4)). However, the renunciation is not complete if motivated in whole or part by one of the following:

- They postpone the criminal conduct to a more advantageous time, or to transfer the criminal effort to another but similar objective or victim.
- They are merely reacting to circumstances that increase the probability of detection or apprehension.
- They are reacting to a change in circumstances that makes the crime harder to commit.

== Attempts to commit specific offenses ==
=== Murder ===
See Attempted murder.

=== Manslaughter ===
See Manslaughter in English law § Attempt.

=== Rape ===
See Rape in English law § Attempt.

== See also ==
- Attempt (German penal code)
- Criminal law
- Impossibility defense
- Impossibility of performance in Contract law
- People v. Superior Court (Decker)
- State v. Mitchell
