= Model Penal Code =

Model act made to help standardize U.S. state criminal laws

The Model Penal Code (MPC) is a model act designed to stimulate and assist U.S. state legislatures to update and standardize the penal law of the United States. The MPC was a project of the American Law Institute (ALI), and was published in 1962 after a ten-year drafting period. The chief reporter on the project was Herbert Wechsler, and contributors included Sanford Kadish and numerous other noted criminal law scholars, prosecutors, and defense lawyers.

The ALI performed an examination of the penal system in the U.S. and the prohibitions, sanctions, excuses, and authority used throughout in order to arrive at a cohesive synthesis to the extent possible, and the best rules for the penal system in the United States. Primary responsibility for criminal law lies with the individual states, which over the years led to great inconsistency among the various state penal codes. The MPC was meant to be a comprehensive criminal code that would allow for similar laws to be passed in different jurisdictions.

The MPC itself is not legally-binding law, but since its publication in 1962 more than half of all U.S. states have enacted criminal codes that borrow heavily from it. It has greatly influenced criminal courts even in states that have not directly drawn from it, and judges increasingly use the MPC as a source of the doctrines and principles underlying criminal liability.

== Key features ==
=== Element analysis ===
Under the MPC, crimes are defined in terms of a set of "elements of the offense," each of which must be proven to the finder of fact beyond a reasonable doubt. There are three types of elements:

1. conduct of a certain nature,
2. attendant circumstances at the time of the conduct, or
3. the result of that conduct.

The elements are those facts that:

1. are included in the definition of forbidden conduct as provided by the statute, or
2. establish the required culpability, or
3. negate an excuse or justification for such conduct, or
4. negate a defense under the statute of limitation, or
5. establish jurisdiction or venue.

All but the last two categories are material elements, and the prosecution must prove that the defendant had the required kind of culpability with respect to that element.

=== Mens rea or culpability ===
One of the major innovations of the MPC is its use of standardized mens rea terms (criminal mind, or in MPC terms, culpability) to determine levels of mental states, just as homicide is considered more severe if done intentionally rather than accidentally. These terms are (in descending order) "purposely", "knowingly," "recklessly", and "negligently", with a fifth state of "strict liability", which is highly disfavored. Each material element of every crime has an associated culpability state that the prosecution must prove beyond a reasonable doubt.

- Purposely. If the element involves the nature of the conduct or the result thereof, it is his conscious object to engage in that conduct or cause the result. If the element involves attendant circumstances, he is aware of the circumstances or believes or hopes that they exist.
- Knowingly. If the element involves the nature of the conduct or the attendant circumstances, he is aware that his conduct is of that nature or that the circumstances exist. If the element involves a result, he is practically certain that the result will occur. Further, if the element involves knowledge of the existence of a particular fact, it is satisfied if he is aware of a high probability of the existence of that fact, unless he actually believes that it does not exist.
- Recklessly. A person consciously disregards a substantial and unjustifiable risk that the element exists or will result, such that its disregard involves a gross deviation from the standard of conduct that a law-abiding person would observe.
- Negligently. A person should be aware of a substantial and unjustifiable risk that the element exists or will result, such that the failure to perceive it involves a gross deviation from the standard of conduct that a reasonable person would observe.

If an offense requires a specific kind of culpability, then any more severe culpability will suffice. Thus if an offense is defined in the form, "It is illegal to knowingly do X," then it is illegal to do X knowingly or purposely (a more severe state), but not to do so recklessly or negligently (the two less severe states). Strict liability means that it is illegal to do something, regardless of one's mental state. If a statute provides only a single kind of culpability for a crime, that kind of culpability is assumed to apply to all elements. If no culpability is stated by statute, a minimum of recklessness is assumed to be required. The MPC declines to use the common terms "intentional" or "willful" in its specification of crimes, in part because of the complex interpretive history of these terms. However, it defines that any (non-MPC) statute in the jurisdiction's criminal code that uses the term "intentionally" shall mean "purposely," and any use of "willfully" shall mean "with knowledge." If a law makes an actor absolutely liable for an offense, MPC sections 2.05 and 1.04 state that the actor can only be guilty of what the MPC calls violations (essentially meaning civil infractions), which only carry fines or other monetary penalties, and no jail time.

=== Unlawful acts explicitly set forth ===
Another important feature is that under the MPC, any action not explicitly outlawed is legal. This concept follows the saying, "That which is not forbidden is allowed" as opposed to "That which is not allowed is forbidden." Legal scholars contrast the MPC's limits with laws passed by Nazi Germany and the Soviet Union, which allowed people to be punished for acts not specifically outlawed but similar to acts that were. The MPC provision has a prospective effect in that it applies to those acts which may be committed in the future. This is not the same as a retrospective effect of past acts which are protected by the rule against ex post facto laws.

Under the MPC, ignorance of criminal law is not considered a valid defense, unless the legislature intended on making the mistake of law a defense, the law is unknown to the actor and had not been published, or the actor is acting as a result of some official statement about the law. See sections 2.02(9) and 2.04.

=== Options for enacting jurisdictions ===
Certain parts of the MPC contain multiple options, inviting states to choose one. A particularly controversial topic was the proper place of the death penalty in the MPC. However, the MPC explicitly states that the "[American Law] Institute took no position on the desirability of the death penalty." Note that no state is obliged to adopt any specific part of the MPC; see below.

== Criticism ==
Advocates of the MPC stress that the law must be clearly defined to prevent arbitrary enforcement, or a chilling effect on a population that does not know what actions are punishable. This is known as the legality principle. However, critics say that the assumption that there are no possible legal systems between the extremes of "forbidden" and "allowed" is the central weakness of the MPC. British law, for example, assumes that a jury can decide what is "reasonable" both in the context of British law and social expectations as well as the specific accusation they are being asked to judge. Behavior may thus be deemed unlawful by a jury in cases where the MPC would require legislative change to produce a conviction.

== Use ==
The MPC is not law in any jurisdiction of the United States; however, it served and continues to serve as a basis for the replacement of existing criminal codes in over two-thirds of the states. Many states adopted portions of the MPC, but only states such as New Jersey, New York, and Oregon have enacted almost all of the provisions. Idaho adopted the model penal code in its entirety in 1971, but the legislature repealed this action two months after it came into effect in 1972.

The repeal of the MPC in Idaho came about after intense rejection of the new codification due to the lack of laws regulating morality, areas of the MPC that affected important political groups in the state, and also prosecutors and police who were critical of some areas of the new MPC-based code. The state bar association, judiciary committees in the legislature, and the Supreme Court of Idaho defended the new MPC-based code. Chiefs in the objections were the omission of sodomy, adultery and fornication as crimes, as well as objection by gun owners of the new stricter gun control law.

On rare occasions, the courts will turn to the MPC for its commentary on the law and use it to seek guidance in interpreting non-code criminal statutes. It is also used frequently as a tool for comparison.

Section 230.3 Abortion (Tentative draft 1959, Official draft 1962) of the MPC was used as a model for abortion law reform legislation enacted in 13 states from 1967 to 1972. It is included as Appendix B of Justice Blackmun's opinion in the January 22, 1973 Doe v. Bolton decision of the United States Supreme Court (Roe v. Wade's lesser-known companion case). It would legalize abortion to preserve the health (whether physical or mental) of the mother, as well as if the pregnancy is due to incest or rape, or if doctors agree that there is a significant risk that the child will be born with a serious mental or physical defect.

In October 2009, the ALI voted to disavow the framework for capital punishment that it had included in the MPC, "in light of the current intractable institutional and structural obstacles to ensuring a minimally adequate system for administering capital punishment." A study commissioned by the institute had said that experience had proved that the goal of individualized decisions about who should be executed and the goal of systemic fairness for minorities and others could not be reconciled.

== See also ==
- Commonwealth v. O'Malley
