= Recklessness (law) =

Intentionally disregarding risks of an act

In criminal law and in the law of tort, recklessness may be defined as the state of mind where a person deliberately and unjustifiably pursues a course of action while consciously disregarding any risks flowing from such action. (Note: The precise definition of recklessness is a subject of debate.) Recklessness is less culpable than malice, but is more blameworthy than carelessness.

== Mens rea and actus reus ==
To commit a criminal offence of ordinary liability (as opposed to strict liability) the prosecution must show both the actus reus (guilty act) and mens rea (guilty mind). A person cannot be guilty of an offence for his actions alone; there must also be the requisite intention, knowledge, recklessness, or criminal negligence at the relevant time. In the case of negligence, however, the mens rea is implied.

Criminal law recognizes recklessness as one of four main classes of mental state constituting mens rea elements to establish liability, namely:

- Intention: intending the action; foreseeing the result; desiring the result: e.g. murder.
- Knowledge: knowing of the falsity or wrongfulness of one's actions or knowledge of a risk that a prohibited result is likely to occur but proceeding anyway. This also includes wilful blindness in most jurisdictions, and recklessness in some others. An example would be offenses involving possession: the accused must have controlled the item and knew that it was contraband.
  - Wilful blindness: having a subjective awareness that a risk could exist (but not necessarily full knowledge) but proceeding without making more inquiries, e.g. a person is asked to bring a suitcase across a border: the person may not know that the suitcase contains drugs but has some suspicions (the person may think the suitcase could contain large sums of money) and, without ever asking or checking what's inside, bringing the suitcase across the border.
- Recklessness: willingly taking an initial action that a reasonable person would know will likely lead to the actus reus being committed, e.g. drinking alcohol and then driving as a result of automation due to intoxication.
- Carelessness (also known as negligence): failing to exercise due diligence to prevent the actus reus that caused the harm from occurring – rarely used in criminal law, often encountered in regulatory offenses (e.g. careless driving) or in the civil law tort of negligence – these are known as strict liability offenses.

The tests for any mens rea element relies on an assessment of whether the accused had foresight of the prohibited consequences and desired to cause those consequences to occur. The three types of test are:

1. subjective where the court attempts to establish what the accused was actually thinking at the time the actus reus was caused;
2. objective where the court imputes mens rea elements on the basis that a reasonable person with the same general knowledge and abilities as the accused would have had those elements, (although R v Gemmell and Richards deprecated this in England and Wales); or
3. hybrid, i.e. the test is both subjective and objective

The most culpable mens rea elements will have both foresight and desire on a subjective basis.

A subjective test is applied to offenses requiring intent, knowledge or wilful blindness.

For recklessness, a subjective test is applied to determine whether accused wilfully took an initial action that is inherently risky (such as drinking alcohol) but an objective test is applied to determine whether the commission of the actus reus could be foreseen (by a reasonable person).

For carelessness, once the prosecution proved the acteus reus, the defendant must prove that they exercised all the care a reasonable person would to prevent the actus reus from occurring.

Recklessness shows less culpability than intention, but more culpability than criminal negligence.

There are also absolute liability offenses such as speeding. These do not require a guilty mind and due diligence is not a defense but a person cannot be imprisoned for an absolute liability offense.

Recklessness usually arises when an accused should be aware of the potentially adverse consequences to the planned actions, but has gone ahead anyway, exposing a particular individual or unknown victim to the risk of suffering the foreseen harm but not actually desiring that the victim be hurt. The accused is a social danger because they gamble with the safety of others, and, unless they exercised all possible due diligence, the fact they might have acted to try to avoid the injury from occurring is relevant only to mitigate the sentence. Note that gross criminal negligence represents such a serious failure to foresee that in any other person, it would have been recklessness.

A statutorily defined offence will be presumed to require mens rea, even if the Act is silent on the issue.

Criminal systems of the civil law tradition distinguish between intention in the broad sense (dolus directus and dolus eventualis), and negligence. Negligence does not carry criminal responsibility unless a particular crime provides for its punishment.

== United States ==
Black's Law Dictionary defines recklessness in American law as "Conduct whereby the actor does not desire harmful consequence but ... foresees the possibility and consciously takes the risk", or alternatively as "a state of mind in which a person does not care about the consequences of his or her actions". In American courts, like English courts, a wrongdoer is found guilty of recklessness based upon the subjective test rule, where the accused must have had the same reasonable knowledge or ability to know the circumstances surrounding the incident in order to be found guilty of recklessness.

In American tort law, recklessness of the tortfeasor can cause the plaintiff to be entitled to punitive damages. Although there is no difference in the quantity of punitive damages awarded for recklessness rather than malice (that is, a plaintiff does not get more punitive damages for establishing malice than he would for establishing recklessness), plaintiffs may still desire to prove maliciousness because, in American bankruptcy law, debts incurred through willful and malicious injuries cannot be discharged in bankruptcy, but debts incurred through recklessness can.

== England and Wales ==
The modern definition of recklessness has developed from R v Cunningham [1957] 2 QB 396 in which the definition of 'maliciously' for the purposes of the Offences against the Person Act 1861 was held to require a subjective rather than objective test when a man released gas from the mains while attempting to steal money from the pay-meter. As a result, the gas leaked into the house next door, and partially asphyxiated the man's mother-in-law.

The Court of Criminal Appeal reversed the conviction by the trial judge because "maliciously" was read to mean that the result was a reasonably foreseeable consequence of the defendant's actions, saying:

In any statutory definition of a crime, malice must be taken ... as requiring either:

1. an actual intention to do the particular kind of harm that in fact was done; or
2. recklessness as to whether such harm should occur or not (i.e. the accused has foreseen that the particular kind of harm might be done and yet has gone on to take the risk of it).

This type of recklessness is called "Cunningham recklessness".

The current test in England and Wales is thus one of subjective recklessness, as reaffirmed by the House of Lords in R v G [2003].

=== R v Caldwell and R v Lawrence ===
In R v Caldwell [1982] AC 341 a new definition of recklessness was adopted.

In late 1979, Caldwell, a disgruntled former hotel employee who had recently been fired by his boss, got very drunk one night and decided to set fire to his former employer's hotel, intending to damage the property. When he set the blaze there were ten guests asleep inside the hotel, and though the fire was extinguished quickly, Caldwell was charged not only with arson, contrary to section 1(1) of the Criminal Damage Act 1971 (to which he pleaded guilty), but with the more serious charge of arson with intent to endanger human life, contrary to section 1(2) of that Act.

Caldwell was convicted under section 1(2), which requires that the defendant shall:

1. intend to destroy or damage any property or be reckless as to [the same] and
2. intend by the destruction or damage to endanger the life of another or be reckless as to whether the life of another would be thereby endangered.

The House of Lords was mainly concerned with the extent to which self-induced drunkenness could be a defence to offences of specific intent and basic intent, the latter encompassing recklessness. The Lords ultimately ruled that self-induced intoxication could be a defence to specific intent, but not to basic intent, i.e. recklessness.

The discussion of recklessness in this case tends to be largely obiter dicta. However Lord Diplock said at 354F that it would be proper to direct a jury that a defendant charged with an offence under section 1(1) of the Criminal Damage Act 1971 is "reckless as to whether or not any property would be destroyed or damaged" if:

1. he does an act which in fact creates an obvious risk that property will be destroyed or damaged; and
2. when he does the act, he either has not given any thought to the possibility of there being any such risk or has recognised that there was some risk involved and has nonetheless gone on to do it.

To that extent, the test is one of obviousness, i.e. if it would have been obvious to the reasonable person, the defendant will be punished for failing to foresee it.

The decision in Caldwell was followed in R v Lawrence [1982] AC 510 in which the defendant was charged with the offence of causing death by reckless driving contrary to section 1 of the Road Traffic Act 1972. Following his speech in Caldwell at 354C, Lord Diplock said at 526E:

Recklessness on the part of the doer of an act presupposes that there is something in the circumstances that would have drawn the attention of an ordinary prudent individual to the possibility that his act was capable of causing the kind of serious harmful consequences that the section that created the offence was intended to prevent, and that the risk of those harmful consequences occurring was not so slight that an ordinary prudent individual would feel justified in treating them as negligible. It is only when this is so that the doer of the act is acting "recklessly" if, before doing the act, he either fails to give any thought to the possibility of there being any such risk or, having recognised that there was such a risk, he nevertheless goes on to do it.

Archbold Criminal Pleading, Evidence and Practice, 1999, para 17–52 et seq., refers to this definition of recklessness as "Caldwell/Lawrence recklessness", and at para 17–57 as "Diplock recklessness" and at para 17–56 as the "Caldwell test".

This form of recklessness is also called "objective recklessness".

In Elliot v C (a minor) a 14-year-old schoolgirl of low intelligence, who was tired and hungry, inadvertently burned down a garden shed. It was accepted that she did not foresee the risk of fire, and that she had not considered the possible consequences of her action. The court reluctantly followed Caldwell. It held that a defendant is reckless as to whether property is destroyed if he or she fails to give any thought to the possibility that there is a risk that property will be destroyed that would be obvious to a reasonably prudent person, even though that risk would not have been obvious to the defendant (by reason of age or lack of experience or understanding) if he had given any thought to the possibility that there was risk that property would be destroyed.

The focus of this test is the nature of the defendant's conduct rather than his mental state and it became the subject of major criticism. For example, how was the direction to apply to the defendant who had considered the risk and only continued to act after deciding (wrongly as it would later appear) that no risk existed? See Chief Constable of Avon and Somerset v Shimmen 84 Cr App R 7, [1986] Crim LR 800, DC and R v Merrick [1996] 1 Cr App R 130, CA.

In the continuing judicial debate, Lord Keith observed in R v Reid (1992) 3 AER 673 (a reckless driving case) that an absence of something from a person's state of mind is as much part of their state of mind as is its presence. Inadvertence to risk is no less a subjective state of mind than is disregard of a recognised risk. Lord Keith stressed that Lord Diplock qualified the model direction as "an appropriate instruction" only, seeking to introduce different standards for different offences. It was further argued that the model direction breached Article 6 of the European Convention on Human Rights in cases involving a minor or other persons of reduced capacity. The requirement is that "everyone is entitled to a fair and public hearing". But to judge the moral and legal culpability of a child by reference to the understanding and life experience of an adult is irrational and, therefore, unfair. In effect, it imposes strict liability. However, Z and others v United Kingdom (2002) 34 EHRR characterises Article 6 as procedural rather than substantive.

==== Restriction of this test to criminal damage and reckless driving ====
This test was intended to be of general application. In R v Seymour (E), Lord Roskill said that the word "reckless" was to be given the same meaning in relation to all offences which involved recklessness as one of their elements unless an Act of Parliament otherwise provided.

However, the Court of Appeal acted so as to limit its application to offences involving criminal damage and reckless driving.

After a period of confusion, in R v Satnam and Kewal, the Court of Appeal held that this test did not apply to the meaning of the word "reckless" in the definition of rape in section 1 of the Sexual Offences (Amendment) Act 1976. The definition in section 1 of the Sexual Offences Act 2003, which supersedes the 1976 Act in cases arising after 1 May 2004, replaced the test of recklessness as to consent with one of lack of reasonable belief in consent.

In R v Prentice and Sullman, R v Adomako, R v Holloway, the Court of Appeal ruled that the above statement of Lord Roskill was obiter and did not apply to cases of manslaughter consisting of breach of duty. When R v Adomako went to the House of Lords, it was said that, in cases of involuntary manslaughter, a trial judge need not direct a jury in accordance with the definition of recklessness in Lawrence.

==== Abolition of reckless driving ====
The Road Traffic Act 1991 abolished the offences of reckless driving and causing death by reckless driving and replaced them with new offences of dangerous driving and causing death by dangerous driving. The change in nomenclature was a reversion to old terminology of former offences, i.e. apparently replacing a mens rea requirement with a fault element requiring dangerousness. Section 2A of the Road Traffic Act 1988 (inserted by the 1991 Act) now contains a definition of dangerous driving which is wholly objective and speaks of things being "obvious" to a competent and careful driver.

==== R v Caldwell overruled ====
The decision in Caldwell was overruled by the House of Lords in the case of R v G, described below. The objective test that it introduced was phased out, and a form of subjective recklessness was introduced instead for cases involving criminal damage. The majority of mens rea of recklessness is now 'tested' using the Cunningham test.

=== R v G and another [2003] UKHL 50 ===
Two boys, aged 11 and 12 years, were camping without their parents' permission when they entered the back yard of a shop in the early hours of the morning. Lighting some newspapers they found in the yard, they left, with the papers still burning. The newspapers set fire to nearby rubbish bins standing against the shop wall, where it spread up the wall and on to the roof of the shop. Approximately £1m damage was caused. The children argued they expected the fire to burn itself out and said they gave no thought to the risk of its spreading. When their appeal reached the House of Lords, Lord Bingham saw the need to modify Lord Diplock's definition to take account of the defence of infancy, which contains the concept of "mischievous discretion". This rule requires the court to consider the extent to which children of eight or more years are able to understand the difference between "right" and "wrong". The Diplock test of "obviousness" might operate unfairly for 11- and 12-year-old boys if they were held to the same standard as reasonable adults. Bingham stated that a person acts 'recklessly' with respect to:

1. a circumstance when he is aware of a risk that it exists or will exist;
2. a result when he is aware of a risk that it will occur; and it is, in the circumstances known to him, unreasonable to take the risk.

He expressly brings the test back to a subjectivity in that an accused is to be judged on the basis of their age, experience and understanding rather than on the standard of a hypothetical reasonable person who might have better knowledge and understanding. Nevertheless, the test remains hybrid because the credibility of the accused's denial of knowledge and understanding will always be judged against an objective standard of what you would expect a person of the same general age and abilities as the accused to have known.

In Booth v Crown Prosecution Service (2006) All ER (D) 225 (Jan), the Divisional Court upheld a pedestrian's conviction on a charge under the Criminal Damage Act 1971 that, by rashly dashing into the road, he recklessly damaged the vehicle that hit him. This shows that the likely main priority of pedestrians being their own safety under the Highway code's near-universal right of way to road vehicles in the carriageway does not always supersede the duty to make other considerations, such as damage to a road vehicle.

== See also ==
- Recklessness (psychology)
- Willful blindness
- Willful violation

== Bibliography ==
- Davies, Mitchell, Tales from the (Thames) River Bank: R v G and Another (2004) Jo, of Criminal Law.
- De Lia, Andrea, I confini tra recklessness e (criminal) negligence nel sistema penale statunitense, in Archivio Penale, 2024, 2, 1 ss.
- Dörmann, Knut; Doswald-Beck, Louise; Kolb, Robert (2003). "Appendix". Elements of War Crimes. Cambridge University Press. ISBN 0-521-81852-4.
- Elliott, D. W. Endangering Life by Destroying or Damaging Property (1997) CLR 382.
- Field, Stewart & Lynn, Mervyn, The Capacity for Recklessness (1992) 12 Legal Studies 74.
- Field, Stewart & Lynn, Mervyn, Capacity, Recklessness and the House of Lords (1993) CLR 127.
- Kaiser, Dagmar (2005). "Leistungsstōrungen". In Staudinger, Julius von; Martinek, Michael; Beckmann, Roland Michael (eds.). Eckpfeiler Des Zivilrechts. Walter de Gruyter. ISBN 3-8059-1019-3.
- Leigh Recklessness After Reid (1993) 56 MLR 208.
- Stark, Findlay, Culpable carelessness: recklessness and negligence in criminal law, Cambridge, 2018, ISBN 978-1108465120.
- Williams, Glanville, Recklessness Redefined (1981) CLJ 252
