= Intention (criminal law) =

State of mind which must accompany some crimes to make them illegal

In criminal law, Intent is a subjective state of mind (mens rea) that must accompany the acts of certain crimes to constitute a violation. A more formal, generally synonymous legal term is scienter: intent or knowledge of wrongdoing.

== Definitions ==
Intent is defined in English law by the ruling in R v Mohan [1976] QB 1 as "the decision to bring about a prohibited consequence" (malum prohibitum).

A range of words represents shades of intent in criminal laws around the world. The mental element, or mens rea, of murder, for example, was historically called malice aforethought. In some jurisdictions transferred intent allows the prosecution for intentional murder if a death occurs in the course of committing an intentional crime (see Felony murder rule). The intent for the other crime is transferred to the killing in this type of situation. The language of "malice" is mostly abandoned and intent element of a crime, such as intent to kill, may exist without a malicious motive, or even with a benevolent motive, such as in the case of euthanasia.

A person intends a consequence when they 1) foresee that it will happen if their given series of acts or omissions continue, and 2) desire it to happen. The most serious level of culpability, justifying the most serious levels of punishment, is achieved when both these components are actually present in the accused's mind (a "subjective" test). A person who plans and executes a crime is considered, rightly or wrongly, a more serious danger to the public than one who acts spontaneously (perhaps because they are less likely to get caught), whether out of the sudden opportunity to steal, or out of anger to injure another. But intent can also come from the common law viewpoint as well.

== The test of intent ==
The policy issue for those who administer the criminal justice system is that, when planning their actions, people may be aware of many probable and possible consequences. So the decision to continue with the current plan means that all the foreseen consequences are to some extent intentional, i.e. within and not against the scope of each person's intent.

For example, A, a jealous wife, discovers that her husband is having a sexual affair with B. Wishing only to drive B away from the neighbourhood, she goes to B's house one night, pours petrol on and sets fire to the front door. B dies in the resulting fire. A is shocked and horrified. It did not occur to her that B might be physically in danger and there was no conscious plan in her mind to injure B when the fire began. But when A's behaviour is analysed, B's death must be intentional. If A had genuinely wished to avoid any possibility of injury to B, she would not have started the fire. Or, if verbally warning B to leave was not an option, she should have waited until B was seen to leave the house before starting the fire. As it was, she waited until night when it was more likely that B would be at home and there would be fewer people around to raise the alarm. Whereas intent would be less if A had set fire to the house during the day after ringing the doorbell to check no one was home and then immediately ringing the fire brigade to report the fire.

On a purely subjective basis, A intended to render B's house uninhabitable, so a reasonably substantial fire was required. The reasonable person would have foreseen a probability that people would be exposed to the risk of injury. Anyone in the house, neighbours, people passing by, and members of the fire service would all be in danger. The court therefore assesses the degree of probability that B or any other person might be in the house at that time of the night. The more certain the reasonable person would have been, the more justifiable it is to impute sufficient desire to convert what would otherwise only have been recklessness into intent to constitute the offence of murder. But if the degree of probability is lower, the court finds only recklessness proved. Some states once had a rule of felony murder: a death that occurred during commission of a felony automatically imputed sufficient mens rea for murder. This rule has been mostly abolished, and direct evidence of the required mental components is now required. Thus, the courts of most states use a hybrid test of intent, combining both subjective and objective elements, for each offence changed.

For intention in English law, section 8 of the Criminal Justice Act 1967 provides the frame in which the mens rea is assessed. It states:

A court or jury, in determining whether a person has committed an offence,

- (a) shall not be bound in law to infer that he intended or foresaw a result of his actions by reasons only of its being a natural and probable consequence of those actions; but
- (b) shall decide whether he did intend or foresee that result by reference to all the evidence, drawing such inferences from the evidence as appear proper in the circumstances.

Under s. 8(b) therefore, the jury is allowed a wide latitude in applying a hybrid test to impute intent or foresight (for the purposes of recklessness) on the basis of all the evidence.

The United States Supreme Court held in Elonis v. United States that negligence is not sufficient to show intent, but did not rule on the question of recklessness.

== Offences of basic and of specific intent ==
In some states, a distinction is made between an offence of basic (sometimes termed "general") intent and an offence of specific intent.

1. Offences requiring basic intent specify a mens rea element that is no more than the intentional or reckless commission of the actus reus. The actor either knew (intended) or deliberately closed his mind to the risk (recklessness) that his action (actus reus) would result in the harm suffered by the victim. The crime of battery, for example, only requires the basic intent that the actor knew or should have known that his action would lead to harmful contact with the victim.
2. A limited number of offences are defined to require a further element in addition to basic intent, and this additional element is termed specific intent. There are two classes of such offences:
  1. Some legislatures decide that particular criminal offences are sufficiently serious that the mens rea requirement must be drafted to demonstrate more precisely where the fault lies. Thus, in addition to the conventional mens rea of intent or recklessness, a further or additional element is required. For example, in English law, s. 18 of the Offences against the Person Act 1861 defines the actus reus as causing grievous bodily harm but requires that this be performed:
    1. unlawfully and maliciously – the modern interpretation of "malice" for these purposes is either intent or recklessness, "unlawfully" means without some lawful excuse (such as self-defense); and with
    2. the intent either to cause grievous bodily harm or to resist lawful arrest.
    The rule in cases involving such offences is that the basic element can be proved in the usual way, but the element of specific intent must be shown using a more subjective than objective test so that the legislature's express requirement can be seen to be satisfied.
  2. The inchoate offences such as attempt and conspiracy require specific intent in a slightly different sense. The rationale for the existence of criminal laws is as a deterrent to those who represent a danger to society. If an accused has actually committed the full offence, the reality of the danger has been demonstrated. But, where the accused is merely acting in anticipation of committing the full offence at some time in the future, a clear subjective intent to cause the actus reus of the full offence must be demonstrated. Without this specific intent, there is insufficient evidence that the accused is the clear danger as feared because, at any time before the commission of the full offence, the accused may change their mind and not continue. Hence, this specific intent must also be demonstrated on a subjective basis.

At times a forensic psychiatric examination may be helpful in ascertaining the presence or absence of mens rea in crimes which require specific intent.

== Direct intent and oblique intent ==
Direct intent: a person has direct intent when they intend a particular consequence of their act.

Oblique intent: the person has oblique intent when the event is a natural consequence of a voluntary act and they foresee it as such. The 'natural consequence' definition was replaced in R v Woollin with the 'virtually certain' test. A person is now held to intend a consequence (obliquely) when that consequence is a virtually certain consequence of their action, and they knew it to be a virtually certain consequence. The first leg of this test has been condemned as unnecessary: a person should be held as intending a consequence if they believed it to be a virtually certain consequence, regardless of whether it was in fact virtually certain.

This has two applications:

1. When a person is planning to achieve a given consequence, there may be several intermediate steps that have to be taken before the full result as desired is achieved. It is not open to the accused to pick and choose which of these steps are or are not intended. The accused is taken to intend to accomplish all outcomes necessary to the overall plan. For example, if A wishes to claim on B's life insurance policy, and so shoots at B who is sitting in a bus, the bullet may have to pass through a window. Thus, even though A may not have desired B's death, it was an inevitable precondition to a claim. Similarly, he may never consciously have considered the damage to the window, but both the murder and the damage under the Criminal Damage Act 1971 are intended. This is distinguishing between the direct intent, which is the main aim of the plan—and the oblique intent, which covers all intermediate steps. More generally, someone directly intends a consequence when their purpose or aim is to cause it, even though they believe the likelihood of success is remote. In R v Dadson, for example, the defendant shot at a man he wrongly believed was out of range. In R v Mohan, the court held that direct intent means, "aim or purpose"—"a decision to bring about, insofar as it lies within the accused's power, the commission of the offence ... no matter whether the accused desired that consequence of his act or not".
2. Sometimes, by accident, a plan miscarries and the accused achieves one or more unintended consequences. In this situation, the accused is taken to have intended all of the additional consequences that flow naturally from the original plan. This is tested as matters of causation and concurrence, i.e. whether the given consequences were reasonably foreseeable, there is no novus actus interveniens and the relevant mens rea elements were formed before all of the actus reus components were completed.

== Unconditional intent and conditional intent ==
Unconditional intent: a person's expected result from the consequence of their actions.

Conditional intent: a person's expected result only when a condition diverts the person from their unconditional intent.

For example, a couple is planning to have an outdoor wedding, but also reserve an indoor facility in the unlikely condition of bad weather. The unconditional intent is to have the wedding outside. The conditional intent is to have the wedding inside on the condition of bad weather.

In Holloway v. United States, the United States Supreme Court held that the word 'intent' within a federal statute could mean either a person's "unconditional intent", "conditional intent", or both, depending on context and the congressional purpose of the statute.

Holloway was charged and convicted with the federal crime of carjacking "with the intent to cause death or serious bodily harm". Holloway admitted to carjacking at gunpoint but argued he only intended to use his weapon "if any of the drivers had given him a hard time". The unconditional intent was to carjack without harm to the driver. The conditional intent was to carjack and cause harm to the driver if the driver became uncooperative.

The issue of this case was whether the statute's phrase "with the intent to cause death or serious bodily harm" applies to a defendant's unconditional intent or conditional intent. The Court found that although the construction of the phrase suggests that Congress meant to provide "a federal penalty for only those carjackings in which the offender actually attempted to harm or kill the driver ... that a commonsense reading of the carjacking statute counsels that Congress intended to criminalize a broader scope of conduct than attempts to assault or kill in the course of automobile robberies". The Court, therefore, affirmed Holloway's conviction and held that a defendant's conditional intent may be an element of a federal crime depending on the context and purpose of the statute.

== Purpose intent and knowledge intent ==
In many situations in the United States, a person is considered to have acted with intent if the definitions of purpose or knowledge are satisfied. In other situations (especially regarding specific intent crimes that have "with intent to" in their definition), intent may be considered to refer to purpose only. Arguably, the most influential legal definitions of purpose and knowledge come from the Model Penal Code's definitions of mens rea.

Under UK case law, if proof of intent to deceive is required, a company can be convicted on an offence where the manager concerned can be shown to have formed that intention.

== See also ==
- ATF fictional sting operations – US legal case justified by Department of Justice as preventing crime but rejected due to question of intention
- Collective intentionality
- Consciousness of guilt
- Negligence
- Recklessness (law)
- Scienter
- Velleity
- Cogitationis poenam nemo patitur
