= Water torture =

Methods of torture using water

Water torture encompasses a variety of techniques using water to inflict physical or psychological harm on a victim as a form of torture or execution.

== Forced ingestion ==
In this form of water torture, water is forced down the throat and into the stomach. It was used as a legal torture and execution method by the courts in France in the 17th and 18th centuries. At the end of the 19th century and beginning of the 20th century it was used against Filipinos by American Forces during the Philippine–American War and was employed against British Commonwealth, American and Chinese prisoners of war during World War II by the Japanese. The Human Rights Watch organization reports that in the 2000s, security forces in Uganda sometimes forced a detainee to lie face up under an open water spigot.

Water intoxication can result from drinking too much water. This has caused some fatalities over the years in fraternities in North America during initiation week. For example, a person was hazed to death by Chi Tau of Chico State (California) in 2005 via the forcing of pushups and the drinking of water from a bottle.

== Waterboarding ==
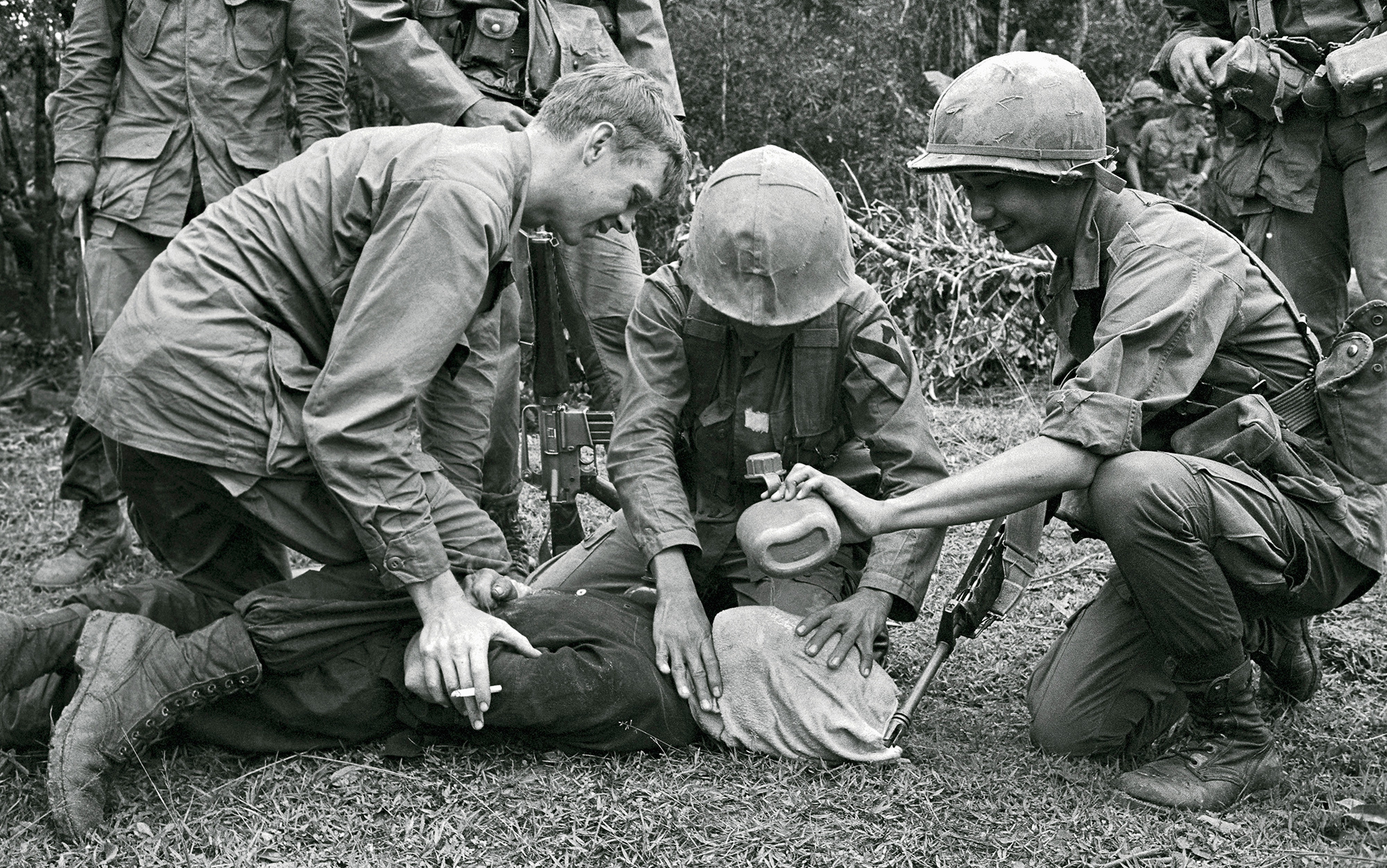
Two United States soldiers and one South Vietnamese soldier waterboard a captured North Vietnamese prisoner of war near Da Nang. Published on the front cover of The Washington Post on 21 January 1968.

Waterboarding or controlled drowning is a form of torture in which water is poured over a cloth covering the face and breathing passages of an immobilized captive, causing the person to experience the sensation of drowning. In the most common method of waterboarding, the captive's face is covered with cloth or some other thin material and immobilized on their back at an incline of 10 to 20 degrees. Torturers pour water onto the face over the breathing passages, causing an almost immediate gag reflex and creating a drowning sensation for the captive. Waterboarding can cause extreme pain, damage to lungs, brain damage from oxygen deprivation, other physical injuries including broken bones due to struggling against restraints, and lasting psychological damage. Adverse physical effects can last for months, and psychological effects for years.

The term "water board torture" appeared in press reports as early as 1976. The method has been used in diverse places and at various points in history, including the Spanish and Flemish Inquisitions, by the United States military during the Philippine–American War, by Japanese and German officials during World War II, by the French in the Algerian War, by the U.S. during the Vietnam War and the war on terror, by the Pinochet regime in Chile, by the Khmer Rouge in Cambodia, by British security forces during the Troubles, by South African police during the Apartheid era and by Israel during the Gaza genocide. Historically, waterboarding has been viewed as an especially severe form of torture.

== Chinese water torture ==
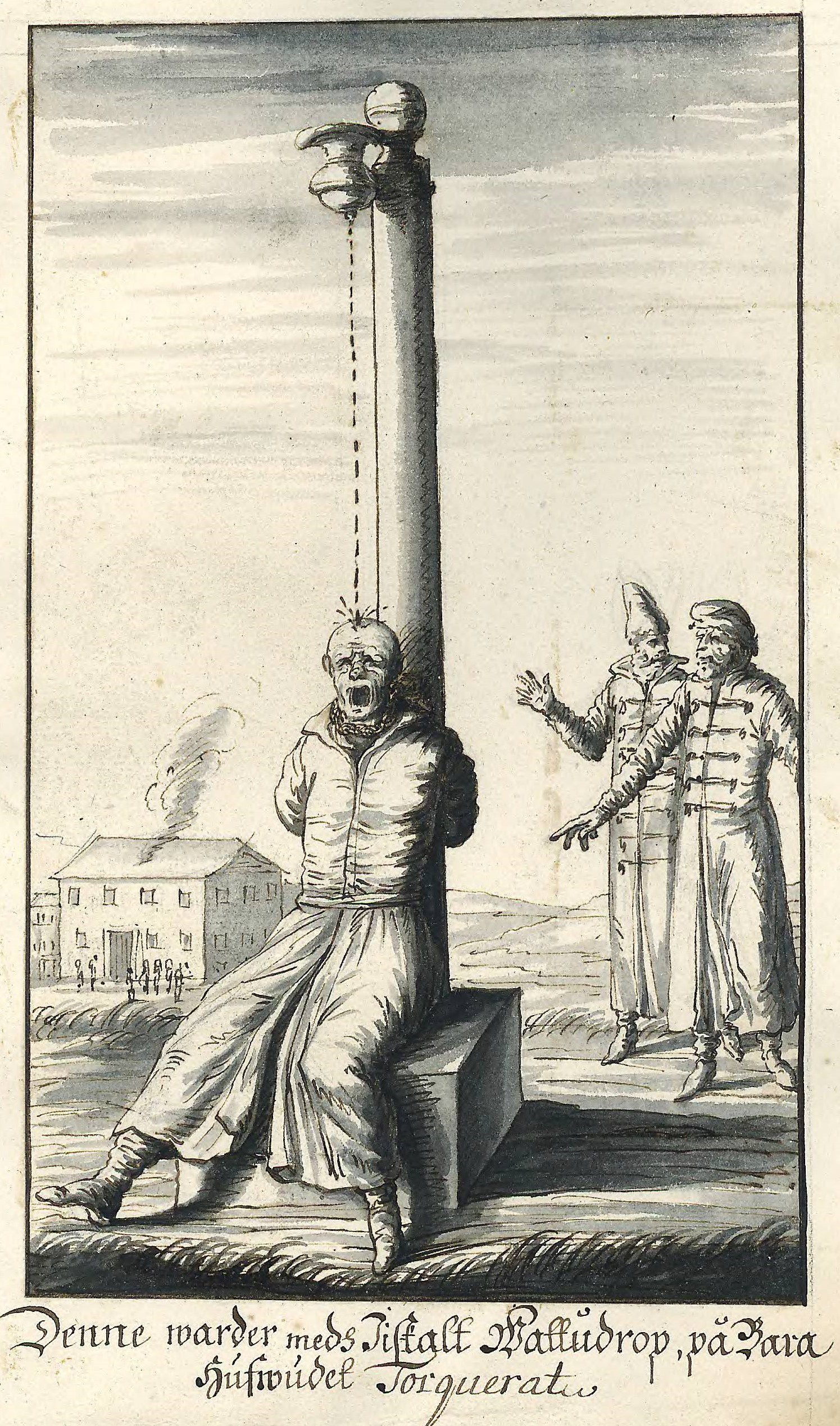
"This [man] gets tortured with poisonous water-dripping on his bare head." 1674.

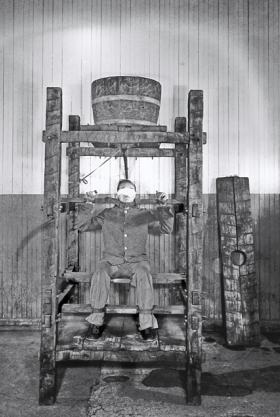
A victim of Chinese water torture at Sing Sing Prison in Ossining, New York

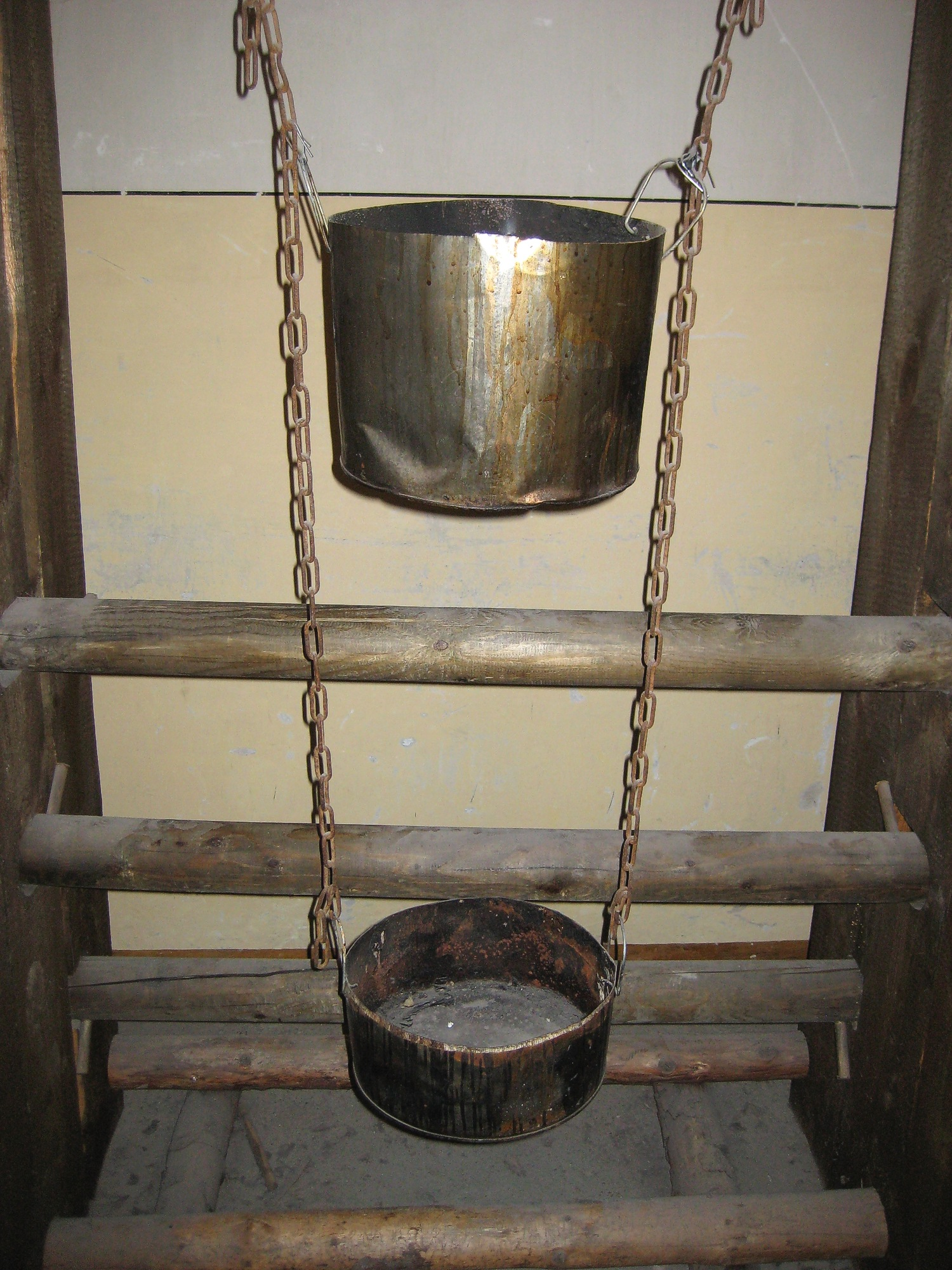
A reproduction of a Chinese water torture apparatus at Berlin-Hohenschönhausen Memorial

Chinese water torture, or use of a dripping machine, is a psychological torture tactic in which cold water is slowly dripped onto the victim's scalp, forehead or face for a prolonged period of time. The process causes fear and mental deterioration of the subject. The pattern of the drops is often irregular, and the cold sensation is jarring, which causes anxiety as the victim tries to anticipate the next drip.

Despite the name, it is not a Chinese invention and it is not traditional anywhere in Asia. Its earliest known version was first documented by Hippolytus de Marsiliis in Bologna (now in Italy) in the late 15th or early 16th century, and it was widely used in Western countries before being popularized by Harry Houdini in the early 20th century.

== Dunking ==
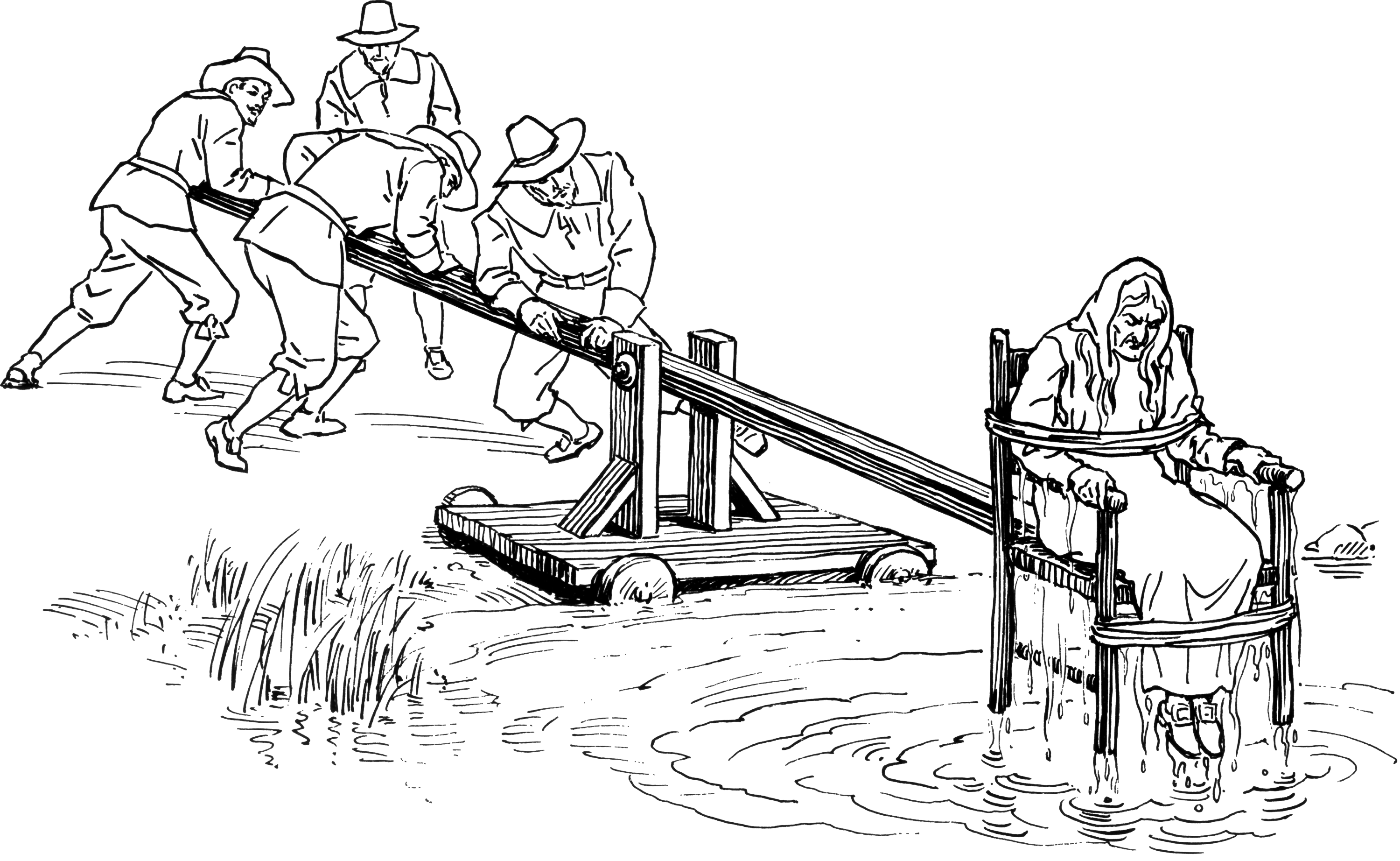
Illustration from a Pearson Scott Foresman text book

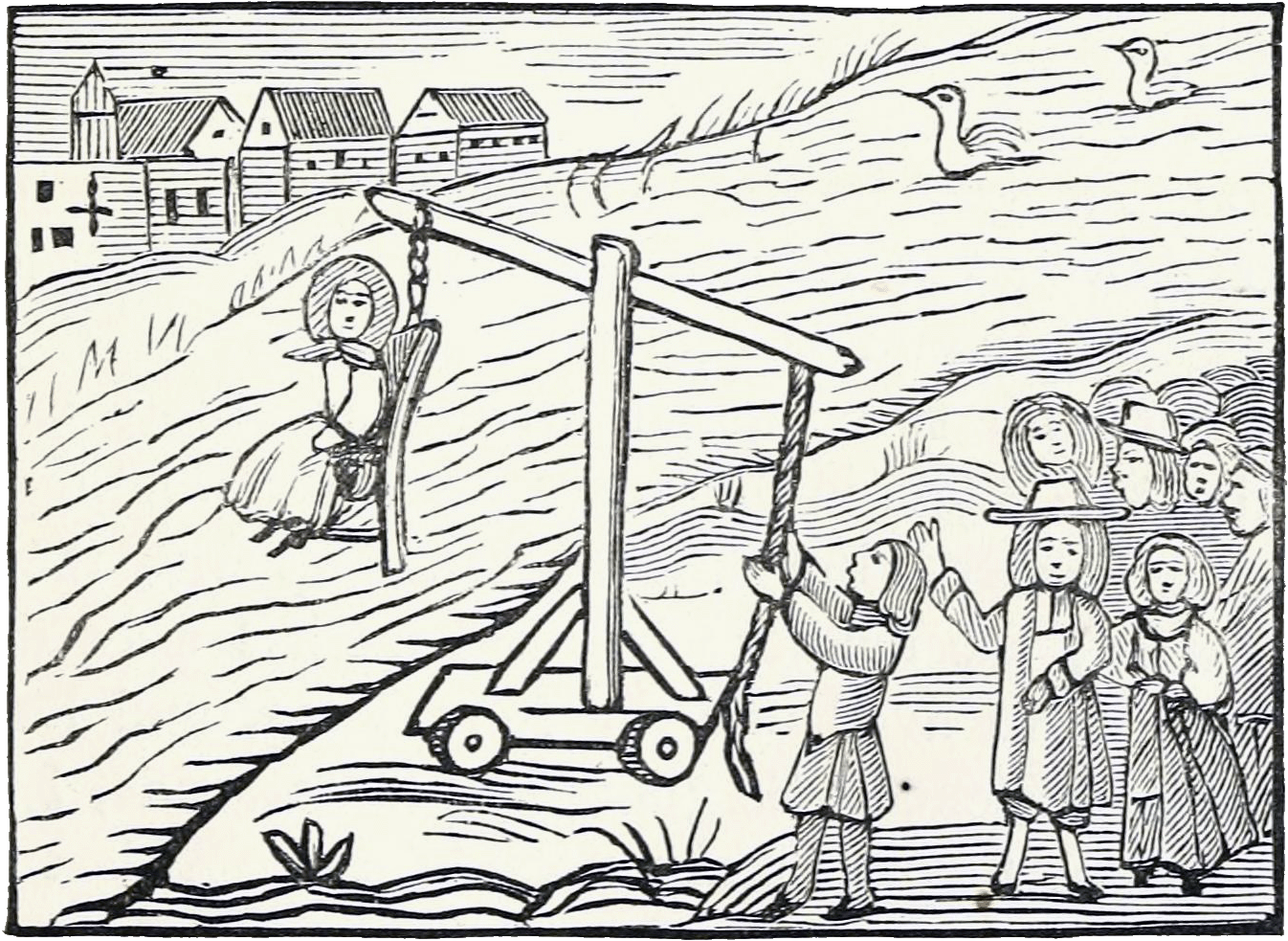
Punishing a woman accused of excessive arguing in the ducking stool

Ducking stools or cucking stools were chairs formerly used for punishment of disorderly women, scolds, and dishonest tradesmen in medieval Europe and elsewhere at later times. The ducking-stool was a form of wymen pine, or "women's punishment", as referred to in Langland's Piers Plowman (1378). They were instruments of public humiliation and censure both primarily for the offence of scolding or backbiting and less often for sexual offences like bearing an illegitimate child or prostitution.

The stools were technical devices which formed part of the wider method of law enforcement through social humiliation. A common alternative was a court order to recite one's crimes or sins after Mass or in the market place on market day or informal action such as a Skimmington ride. They were usually of local manufacture with no standard design. Most were simply chairs into which the offender could be tied and exposed at her door or the site of her offence. Some were on wheels like a tumbrel that could be dragged around the parish. Some were put on poles so that they could be plunged into water, hence "ducking" stool. Stocks or pillories were similarly used for the punishment of men or women by humiliation.

The term "cucking-stool" is older, with written records dating back to the 13th and 14th centuries. Written records for the name "ducking stool" appear from 1597, and a statement in 1769 relates that "ducking-stool" is a corruption of the term "cucking-stool". Whereas a cucking-stool could be and was used for humiliation with or without dunking the person in water, the name "ducking-stool" came to be used more specifically for those cucking-stools on an oscillating plank which were used to duck the person into water.

== Other forms ==
- Supposedly, the rasphuis [rasp-house] in Amsterdam – a 17th century institution that attempted to rehabilitate young male criminals through forced labor – contained a "water dungeon", the so-called waterhuis [water-house]. If prisoners refused to work, they were placed in a cellar that quickly filled with water after a sluice was opened and were handed a pump that enabled them to keep from drowning. Geert Mak and other authors, however, point out that there is no evidence for the existence of this room.
- In the 1970s at Bautzen Prison in the German Democratic Republic there was a punishment cell that filled up with water up to a red light which a large prisoner described as at nose level if he is on tip toes.
- In the 20th century, various U.S. newspapers published details of "water torture" (or the "torture of thirst") in Japan which involved subjecting the victim to a high salt diet for several days, without rice or water, and then offering them water in exchange for a confession: "It is difficult to imagine a more cruel device."

== Sources ==
- Cox, Rory (2018). "Historicizing waterboarding as a severe torture norm". International Relations. 32 (4): 488–512. doi:10.1177/0047117818774396. hdl:10023/16068. S2CID 150350366.
