= Common law offence =

Criminal category under some jurisdictions

Common law offences are crimes under English criminal law, the related criminal law of some Commonwealth countries, and under some U.S. state laws. They are offences under the common law, developed entirely by the law courts, having no specific basis in statute.

== Australia ==
Under the criminal law of Australia the Criminal Code Act 1995 (Commonwealth) abolished all common law offences at the federal level. The Australian Capital Territory, the Northern Territory, Queensland, Tasmania and Western Australia have also abolished common law offences, but they still apply in New South Wales, South Australia and Victoria. Although some common law offences still exist in New South Wales, many common law offences – for example nightwalking, riot, rout, affray, keeping of bawdy houses, champerty and maintenance, eavesdropping and being a common scold – have been abolished in that State.

== Canada ==
In Canada the consolidation of criminal law in the Criminal Code, enacted in 1953, involved the abolition of all common law offences except contempt of court (preserved by section 9 of the Code).

== England and Wales ==
In England and Wales, the Law Commission's programme of codification of the criminal law included the aim of abolishing all the remaining common law offences and replacing them, where appropriate, with offences precisely defined by statute. Common law offences were seen as unacceptably vague and open to development by the courts in ways that might offend the principle of certainty. However, neither the Law Commission nor the UK Parliament have completed the necessary revisions of the law, so some common law offences still exist. In England and Wales, unless a specific maximum sentence has been codified, common law offences are punishable by unlimited fines and unlimited imprisonment.

Common law offences that have been abolished or redefined as statutory offences are listed at History of English criminal law § Common law offences.

=== List of offences under the common law of England ===
Offence	Status	Statute (where applicable)
Accessory	Statutory (variable)	Accessories and Abettors Act 1861
Affray	Statutory (either way)	Public Order Act 1986
Arson	Statutory (indictable)	Criminal Damage Act 1971
Assault with intent to rob	"Rob" and sentence and mode of trial statutory (indictable)	Theft Act 1968
Attempt	Statutory (variable)	Criminal Attempts Act 1981
Barratry (being a common barrator)	Abolished	Criminal Law Act 1967
Battery	Sentence and mode of trial statutory (summary, or either way against an emergency worker)	Criminal Justice Act 1988
Being a common scold	Abolished	Criminal Law Act 1967
Blasphemy	Abolished	Criminal Justice and Immigration Act 2008
Blasphemous libel	Abolished	Criminal Justice and Immigration Act 2008
Breach of prison (escape with use of force)	Current	
Bribery	Statutory (either way)	Bribery Act 2010
Buggery	Abolished	Sexual Offences Act 1967
Burglary	Statutory (indictable)	Theft Act 1968
Champerty	Abolished	Criminal Law Act 1967
Cheating	Abolished (except for offences regarding the public revenue)	Theft Act 1968
Common assault (or assault)	Sentence and mode of trial statutory (summary, or either way against an emergency worker)	Criminal Justice Act 1988
Compounding treason	Current	Criminal Law Act 1967 (preserved)
Compounding a felony	Partially statutory, in the form of giving false information relating to an arrestable offence (now one punishable by imprisonment for 5 years or more; indictable); otherwise abolished	Criminal Law Act 1967
Concealment of treasure trove	Statutory (failure to notify coroner of discovery or acquisition of treasure; summary)	Theft Act 1968 (codified); Treasure Act 1996 (reformed)
Conspiracy	Current (to defraud, to corrupt public morals or to outrage public decency); Statutory (otherwise; variable)	Offences against the Person Act 1861 (murder, obsolete); Criminal Law Act 1977 (codification, including murder)
Contempt of court a.k.a. criminal contempt, contumacy	Statutory for magistrates' courts and under the strict liability rule, otherwise current but regulated by statute	Contempt of Court Act 1981
Contempt of the sovereign	Obsolete	
Defamatory libel (sometimes known as criminal libel, although this can refer to several offences of libel)	Abolished	Coroners and Justice Act 2009
Eavesdropping	Abolished	Criminal Law Act 1967
Embracery	Abolished (now usually dealt with as perverting the course of justice, q.v.)	Bribery Act 2010
Escape from lawful custody	Current	
Forcible entry	Statutory (using violence to secure entry; summary)	Criminal Law Act 1977
Forcible detainer	Statutory (adverse occupation of residential premises; summary)	Criminal Law Act 1977
Forgery	Statutory (either way)	Forgery and Counterfeiting Act 1981
High treason	Statutory (indictable)	Treason Act 1351
Incitement	Statutory (encouraging or assisting crime; variable)	Serious Crime Act 2007
Kidnapping	Current (some statutory restrictions on initiating proceedings)	Child Abduction Act 1984
Larceny	Reformed (generally as theft; indictable)	Theft Act 1968
Maintenance	Abolished	Criminal Law Act 1967
Manslaughter	Sentence and mode of trial statutory (indictable)	Offences against the Person Act 1861
Mayhem	Obsolete (usually charged as grievous bodily harm aka wounding)	Offences against the Person Act 1861
Misprision of felony	Abolished, but may never have existed	Criminal Law Act 1967
Misprision of treason	Current	
Murder	Sentence and mode of trial statutory (indictable). Felony murder abolished	Homicide Act 1957 (abolition of felony murder); Murder (Abolition of Death Penalty) Act 1965 (sentence)
Being a common night walker	Abolished	Criminal Law Act 1967
Obscene libel	Abolished	Coroners and Justice Act 2009
Outraging public decency	Current	
Perjury	Statutory (indictable)	Perjury Act 1911
Perverting the course of justice	Current	
Petty treason	Abolished (now simply murder)	Offences against the Person Act 1828
Preventing lawful burial	Current	
Challenging to fight	Abolished	Criminal Law Act 1967
Effecting a public mischief	Current	
Public nuisance	Abolished	Police, Crime, Sentencing and Courts Act 2022
Rape	Statutory (indictable)	Sexual Offences Act 2003
Refusing to assist a constable when called upon to do so	Current	
Riot	Statutory (indictable)	Public Order Act 1986
Robbery	Statutory (indictable)	Theft Act 1968
Rout (unlawful assembly with intent to riot)	Statutory (violent disorder; indictable)	Public Order Act 1986
Running a disorderly house	Obsolete, usually charged as other statutory offences	Sexual Offences Act 1956 (keeping a brothel for prostitution); Misuse of Drugs Act 1971 (permitting use of premises for consumption etc. of controlled drugs); Licensing Act 2003 (serving alcohol on unlicenced premises)
Sedition	Abolished (except incitement of sedition by an alien; either way)	Coroners and Justice Act 2009; Aliens Restriction (Amendment) Act 1919 (sedition by an alien)
Seditious libel	Abolished (except incitement of sedition by an alien; either way)	Coroners and Justice Act 2009; Aliens Restriction (Amendment) Act 1919 (sedition by an alien)
Theft	Statutory (indictable)	Theft Act 1968
Unlawful assembly	Statutory (indictable)	Public Order Act 1986

==== High crimes and misdemeanours ====
- Abuse of authority
- Acceptance of a bribe
- Failure to supervise
- Conduct unbecoming
- Dereliction of duty
- Desertion, Away without leave
- Failure to appear: subpoena, militia call-up, jury notice
- False imprisonment
- Insubordination, Failure to obey a lawful order
- Misappropriation of funds
- Misconduct in public office
- Obstruction of justice, perverting the course of justice, defeating the ends of justice, obstructing the administration of justice
- Perjury of oath

== New Zealand ==
In New Zealand the ability to be proceeded against at common law for being a party to a criminal offence was abolished by section six of the Criminal Code Act 1893. Section five of the Crimes Act, 1908 (which replaced the 1893 enactment), and section 9 of the Crimes Act 1961 (which replaced the 1908 enactment) affirmed the abolition of criminal proceedings at common law, with the exception of contempt of court and of offences tried by courts martial.

== United States ==
The notion that common law offences could be enforced in federal courts was found to be unconstitutional by the U.S. Supreme Court in United States v. Hudson and Goodwin, 11 U.S. 32 (1812). A woman, Anne Royall, was nonetheless found guilty of being a common scold in Washington, D.C. in 1829; a newspaper paid her fine. Some have argued that common law offences are inconsistent with the prohibition of ex post facto laws.

At the state level, the situation varies. Some states, such as New Jersey, have abolished common law crimes (see State v. Palendrano), while others have chosen to continue to recognize them. In some states, the elements of many crimes are defined mostly or entirely by common law, i.e., by prior judicial decisions. For instance, Michigan's penal code does not define the crime of murder: while the penalties for murder are laid out in statute, the actual elements of murder, and their meaning, is entirely set out in case law.

== See also ==
- Nullum crimen, nulla poena sine praevia lege poenali
