= Theftbote =

Misdemeanour in England

Theftbote, a misdemeanour or felony, occurs when a crime victim accepts the return of stolen property or makes other arrangements with a felon in exchange for an agreement not to prosecute. Such private deals were criminalized by Edward III, King of England, because they reduced fines and other forfeitures of property, which were an important part of the royal revenue.

== Learned opinions ==
An early legal treatise defined theftbote as "when a man take any goods of a theefe and maintain him; and not when a man taketh his own goods;" and said "I think it be felony."

According to the influential Sir Edward Coke, theftbote was equivalent to misprision of felony, both having the effect of concealing a felony, and the punishment was "ransome and imprisonment".

The infamous Bernard Mandeville went further, arguing that theftbote was "beyond" misprision, and thus should be a felony itself, because it "undermined the very concept of property," normalized thefts, and incentivized organized crime: "as sure a way to keep up the breed of rogues, and promote the interest of them, as either our fishery or the coal trade are constant nursery of sailors."

Sir Matthew Hale was in agreement "that theftbote is more than a bare misprision of felony, and is, where the owner doth not only know the felony, but takes his goods again, or other amends, not to prosecute." The issue for Hale, and others in agreement, was that a crime was an offense against all of society, and having the Parliament decided it was a crime, only the Crown Prosecution could decide whether to prosecute or not, a crime victim lacking the power to plea bargain.

== Adaptation in the law of British colonies ==
In South Carolina, the English colony and later state adapted the rule of theftbote, as "very nearly allied to felony," however noting a common law exception that no crime has occurred, "unless some favour be shown to the thief."

The British Raj of India whole-heartedly supported the law of theftbote (from theft + mote amends), noting that the mens rea of the crime is "to the intent that he may escape," i.e. that the perpetrator may flee from the law.

== See also ==
- Compounding a felony
- Inchoate crime
- Tax evasion
- Victimology
