= Commonwealth v. Donoghue =

- Court: Kentucky Court of Appeals
- Full case name: Commonwealth v. Donoghue
- Decided: June 23, 1933
- Citations: 250 Ky. 343; 63 S.W.2d 3

Case opinions
- Decision by: Stanley

Keywords
- Common law crimes; conspiracy; reception statutes

Commonwealth v. Donoghue, 250 Ky. 343, 63 S.W.2d 3 (1933), was a case decided by the Kentucky Court of Appeals involving conspiracy based on common law criminal offenses imported through reception statutes.

== Background ==
M. Donoghue and others ran the Boone Loan Company in Kenton County, which was accused of charging usury rates of interest, or loan sharking. The judge created the crime in the case: "a nefarious plan for the habitual exaction of gross injury".

== Decision ==
The Court of Appeals upheld the ability of judges to create common law crimes in the state of Kentucky.

== Later developments ==
In 1975 a Kentucky state statute, KRS 500.020, prohibited the prosecution of common law crimes in Kentucky, rendering the decision in Commonwealth v. Donoghue to be of no further effect.

== See also ==
- State v. Palendrano, a similar case in New Jersey which reached a different conclusion.
