= Perverting the course of justice =

Criminal offence

Perverting the course of justice is an offence committed when a person interferes with the administration of justice. In England and Wales it is a common law offence, carrying a maximum sentence of life imprisonment. Statutory versions of the offence exist in Australia, Canada, Fiji, Ireland, and New Zealand. The Scottish equivalent is defeating the ends of justice, although charges of attempting to pervert the course of justice are also raised in Scotland, while the South African counterpart is defeating or obstructing the course of justice. A similar concept, obstruction of justice, exists in United States law.

== Law by country ==
=== Australia ===
In New South Wales, the equivalent offence is set out in Section 319 of the Crimes Act 1900 (NSW). The maximum penalty is 14 years' imprisonment. In 1985 Murray Farquhar, the former Chief Stipendiary Magistrate of New South Wales, was convicted of attempting to pervert the course of justice to have charges against Kevin Humphreys dismissed and sentenced to a maximum of four years in prison. In 2009 Marcus Einfeld, a former Judge of the Federal Court of Australia, was sentenced to a maximum of three years in prison after pleading guilty to making a false statement with intent to pervert the course of justice.

=== Canada ===
In Canada, the equivalent offence is referred to as "obstructing justice". It is set out in s. 139 of the Criminal Code:

139. (1) Every one who wilfully attempts in any manner to obstruct, pervert or defeat the course of justice in a judicial proceeding,

(a) by indemnifying or agreeing to indemnify a surety, in any way and either in whole or in part, or
(b) where he is a surety, by accepting or agreeing to accept a fee or any form of indemnity whether in whole or in part from or in respect of a person who is released or is to be released from custody,

is guilty of

(c) an indictable offence and is liable to imprisonment for a term not exceeding two years, or
(d) an offence punishable on summary conviction.

(2) Every one who wilfully attempts in any manner other than a manner described in subsection (1) to obstruct, pervert or defeat the course of justice is guilty of an indictable offence and liable to imprisonment for a term not exceeding ten years.

(3) Without restricting the generality of subsection (2), every one shall be deemed wilfully to attempt to obstruct, pervert or defeat the course of justice who in a judicial proceeding, existing or proposed,

(a) dissuades or attempts to dissuade a person by threats, bribes or other corrupt means from giving evidence;
(b) influences or attempts to influence by threats, bribes or other corrupt means a person in his conduct as a juror; or
(c) accepts or obtains, agrees to accept or attempts to obtain a bribe or other corrupt consideration to abstain from giving evidence, or to do or to refrain from doing anything as a juror.

=== England and Wales ===
Doing an act tending and intending to pervert the course of public justice is an offence under the common law of England and Wales.

Perverting the course of justice can include acts such as:

- Fabricating or disposing of evidence
- Intimidating or threatening a witness or juror
- Intimidating or threatening a judge

Also criminal are:

- Conspiring with another to pervert the course of justice, and
- Intending to pervert the course of justice

This offence, and the subject matter of the related forms of criminal conspiracy, have been referred to as:

- Perverting the course of justice
- Interfering with the administration of justice
- Obstructing the administration of justice
- Obstructing the course of justice
- Defeating the due course of justice
- Defeating the ends of justice
- Effecting a public mischief

This proliferation of alternative names has been described as "somewhat confusing".

This offence is also sometimes referred to as "attempting to pervert the course of justice". This is potentially misleading. An attempt to pervert the course of justice is a substantive common law offence and not an inchoate offence. It is not a form of the offence of attempt, and it would be erroneous to charge it as being contrary to section 1(1) of the Criminal Attempts Act 1981.

This offence is triable only on indictment.

=== International Criminal Court ===
In 2020, International Criminal Court (ICC) Prosecutor Fatou Bensouda described attempted interference with ICC witnesses in the Kenya investigation as perverting the course of justice under Article 70 of the Rome Statute, which defines the legal context of the ICC. Arrest warrants were issued against three people for their alleged attempts to make witnesses withdraw statements or refuse to testify to the court.

In October 2026, the US sanctions against the ICC were described as an attempt at obstructing the course of justice. The ICC stated that the sanctions were "aimed at disrupting the Court's operations and at intimidating those who work for or cooperate with the Court".

== Notable convictions ==
=== Australia ===
- Marcus Einfeld, an Australian retired Federal Court and NSW, WA and ACT Supreme Court judge – perjury and perverting the course of justice, for lying relative to a speeding ticket
- Lionel Murphy, an Australian former politician and High Court of Australia judge – initially found guilty of perverting the course of justice; the NSW Appeal Court subsequently quashed the conviction and ordered a retrial; subsequently found not guilty

=== Canada ===
- Peter Gill, convicted of obstruction of justice (Canadian equivalent to perverting the course of justice) for having an affair with one of the jurors during his trial for murder; sentenced to five years and ten months imprisonment.
- Gillian Guess, juror convicted of obstruction of justice for having an affair with one of the accused in a murder trial while the trial was ongoing; sentenced to eighteen months imprisonment.

=== England and Wales ===
- Jonathan Aitken, a politician and British government cabinet minister – perjury and perverting the course of justice
- Jeffrey Archer, an English author and former politician – perjury and perverting the course of justice
- Ali Dizaei, a former commander in London's Metropolitan Police Service – initially found guilty of perverting the course of justice and jailed; later released on appeal; subsequently re-convicted
- Chris Huhne, a journalist and former British government cabinet minister and his former wife, Vicky Pryce – perverting the course of justice (see R v Huhne and Pryce)
- John Humble, a former labourer – perverting the course of justice
- Bruce Hyman, an English barrister – perverting the course of justice
- Karen Matthews and Michael Donovan – found guilty of kidnapping, false imprisonment, and perverting the course of justice

== See also ==
- Offences against public justice
- Compounding a felony
- Compounding treason
- Contempt of court
- Embracery
- Might makes right
- Misprision of felony
- Misprision of treason
- Obstruction of justice, similar charge in the United States
- Right to an effective remedy
- United Nations Convention against Corruption
- British Post Office Scandal
