= History of English criminal law =

The first signs of the modern distinction between criminal and civil proceedings were during the Norman conquest of England in 1066. The earliest criminal trials had very little, if any, settled law to apply. However, the civil delictual law was highly developed and consistent in its operation (except where the king wanted to raise money by selling a new form of writ).

A local lord of the manor (or family) could hold their servants and tenants responsible in a manorial court and was among wealthy people who could more easily enlist the help of a county or city bailiff, posse comitatus if one existed and the justices of the peace. The sheriff was the often-armed representative of the king in a city, town or shire, responsible for collecting taxes and enforcing his laws. The church could hold ecclesiastical courts to resolve offences in its canon law and on its narrow territorial jurisdiction.

Justice for crimes sought in older forums and by private prosecution declined—instead the state courts, and increasingly the state paying lawyers to prosecute became the normal route to justice for matters that conceivably affect or endanger the community at large. In the 18th century European countries began operating police forces; in 1829 the first force formed in England which began its own prosecutions. Consequently criminal law had a more harmonised way of enforcement.

The law as it has developed is described in a number of seminal works.

== Crown Prosecution ==
Historically in England, with no police forces and no prosecution service, the only route to prosecution was through private prosecutions brought by victims at their own expense or lawyers acting on their behalf. From 1829, as the police forces were formed, they began to take on the burden of bringing prosecutions against suspected criminals.

Sir John Maule was appointed to be the first Director of Public Prosecutions for England and Wales in 1880, operating under the Home Office; his jurisdiction was only for decisions as to whether to prosecute in a very small number of difficult or important cases; once prosecution had been authorised, the matter was turned over to the Treasury Solicitor. Police forces continued to be responsible for the bulk of cases, sometimes referring difficult ones to the Director.

In 1962 a Royal Commission recommended that police forces set up independent prosecution departments so as to avoid having the same officers investigate and prosecute cases, although technically the prosecuting police officers did so as private citizens. The Royal Commission's recommendation was not implemented by all police forces, however, and so in 1978, another Royal Commission was set up, this time headed by Sir Cyril Philips. It reported in 1981, recommending that a single unified Crown Prosecution Service with responsibility for all public prosecutions in England and Wales be set up. A White Paper was released in 1983, becoming the Prosecution of Offences Act 1985, which established the CPS under the direction of the Director of Public Prosecutions, consisting of a merger of his old department with the existing police prosecution departments. It began in 1986.

== Common law offences ==
Common law is the body of law created by courts. This consists primarily of rulings clarifying the meaning of statutes (written law promulgated by the monarch, usually in Parliament), but many criminal offences were also convicted by judges and juries who agreed that the conduct of the defendants brought before them was criminal. Such common law offences are generally indictable offences punishable by life imprisonment, unless a statute makes them summary or sets their sentences.

Some common law offences, such as murder, have been crimes since time immemorial, but there are more recent examples, such as outraging public decency, for which no prosecutions are known before the 17th century. In modern times, principles of democratic governance and nulla poena sine praevia lege (no punishment without prior law) generally require new offences to be created before they are tested in court, by statute. A common law offence that has long been recognised as existing will nonetheless still be recognised as valid, until one of the following happens:

- It is explicitly abolished by statute. The wording will be similar to "the common law offence of [name] is abolished" or "the offence at common law" etc. or (particularly in cases when it is unclear whether the offence exists) "any offence under the common law of England and Wales" etc. The conduct may then no longer be prosecuted under the common law, though it may still constitute a different (common law or statutory) offence.
- It is codified. In this case, usually the common law offence is abolished, but the same or similar conduct is defined as an offence at the same time, sometimes with different terminology. For example, the common law offence of larceny was replaced with theft by the Theft Act 1968; what used to be larceny was still a crime, but was no longer called that, and the authority cited in indictments was no longer "larceny, contrary to common law" but "theft, contrary to section 1 of the Theft Act 1968".
- Rendered obsolete. This happens when an offence is created that is already a common law offence, but the common law offence is not abolished. In R v Rimington [2005] UKHL 63 the House of Lords expressed the opinion that "Where Parliament has defined the ingredients of an offence ... it must ordinarily be proper that conduct falling within that definition should be prosecuted for the statutory offence and not for a common law offence", but made it clear that there may be circumstances where the common law offence can still be prosecuted.

On occasion an offence has fallen into disuse long before it was abolished as it was thought never to be in the public interest to prosecute it, but the offence is nonetheless still valid and may be revived at any time. For example, there were no prosecutions for blasphemous libel between 1921 and a private prosecution, Whitehouse v Lemon, in 1976, conviction on which the House of Lords upheld. There were no further prosecutions until the offence was abolished in 2008.

For some offences, such as common assault and murder, prosecution and sentencing have been codified, but the elements of the offence are left to precedent. Whether this means it is a statutory or a common law offence is a matter of debate; assault is typically prosecuted as "contrary to common law and section 39 of the Criminal Justice Act 1988", as both precedent and statute are sources of law for the offence.

== Offences against the person ==
=== Fatal offences ===
==== Extant offences ====
- Murder
- Manslaughter

==== Abolished offences ====
- Petty treason
- Capital murder
- Felo de se

=== Sexual offences ===
==== Extant offences ====
- Rape

==== Abolished offences ====
- Buggery
- Assault with intent to commit buggery
- Gross indecency between men
- Indecent assault on a man
- Indecent assault on a woman

=== Non-fatal non-sexual offences ===
- Common assault

== Offences against property ==
=== Extant offences ===
- Criminal damage in English law#History

=== Abolished offences ===
- Larceny
- Embezzlement
- Fraudulent conversion

== Forgery, personation and cheating ==
=== Abolished offences ===
See forgery:

- Offences under section 18 and section 20 of the Pharmacy Act 1954 repealed by The Pharmacists and Pharmacy Technicians Order 2007

See personation:

- Offences under section 13 of the Customs and Excise Management Act 1979
- Offences under section 12 of the Inland Revenue Regulation Act 1890

(Both repealed by the Commissioners for Revenue and Customs Act 2005)

See cheating:

== Offences against the state or Crown or government and political offences ==
- Attainder

=== Abolished offences ===
- Sedition
- Seditious libel
- Incitement to mutiny, contrary to section 1 of the Incitement to Mutiny Act 1797
- Offences under the Unlawful Drilling Act 1819
- Various forms of statutory piracy

== Offences against religion and public worship ==
=== Abolished offences ===
- Blasphemy
- Blasphemous libel

== Offences against the administration of public justice ==
=== Abolished offences ===
- Misprision of felony
- Compounding a felony
- Embracery

=== Offences held no longer to exist or never to have existed ===
- In 1954, the judgment of the Queen's Bench in the case of R v Newland contraindicated the offence of effecting a public mischief, whereas in Shaw v DPP (1960), the House of Lords ruled that indeed it had existed and continued to exist.
- Conspiracy to effect a public mischief

== Public order offences ==
=== Abolished offences ===
- Rout
- Unlawful assembly
- Breach of the peace
- Defamatory libel

== Offences against public morals and public policy ==
=== Abolished offences ===
- Obscene libel
- Offences under the Prevention of Corruption Acts 1889 to 1916
- The common law offence of bribery

== Participatory offences ==
=== Abolished offences ===
- Incitement
- Accessory to felony: Secondary principal/Principal in the second degree, Accessory before the fact, Accessory after the fact

== Classification of offences ==
=== Abolished classes ===
- Felony
- Misdemeanour
- Arrestable offence

== Defences ==
=== Abolished defences ===
- Provocation

== Procedure ==
=== Abolished proceedings ===
- Criminal information

== See also ==
- Criminal law
