= Omnibus clause =

Legal concept

In law, an omnibus clause is a clause that provides or includes all residuary not specifically mentioned.

== Examples ==
In automobile liability insurance an omnibus clause may provide coverage for the named insured, any member of the insured's household, and any person using the automobile with the insured's permission, provided the use was within the permitted scope.

In a will an omnibus clause can distribute to a named beneficiary all unnamed assets included in the decedent's estate.

In the United States, the Omnibus Clause or Omnibus Provision refers to a specific provision in federal law which appears in section 18 U.S.C. §1503. According to this provision, "anyone who corruptly... obstructs or impedes, or endeavors to influence, obstruct or impede, the due administration of justice", is guilty of the crime of obstruction of justice.
