= Offences against public justice =

Offences against public justice are offences against public justice. Offences against the administration of public justice or offences against the administration of justice are offences against the administration of justice.

== Australia ==
=== South Australia ===
See formerly sections 289 to 298 of the Criminal Law Consolidation Act 1876.

== Canada ==
Part 4 of the Criminal Code makes provision for offences against the administration of law and justice.

== India ==
Offences under the Code of 1860 included:

- Giving false evidence, contrary to section 191 of the Indian Penal Code
- Fabricating false evidence, contrary to section 192 of the Indian Penal Code

== Republic of Ireland ==
Offences include:

- Perjury, contrary to section 2 of the Criminal Justice (Perjury and Related Offences) Act 2021. This was previously a common law offence.
- Contempt of court
- Attempting to pervert the course of justice

In Part 3 of the Criminal Procedure Act 2010, the expression "offence against the administration of justice" is defined by section 7 of that Act, as amended by section 27 of the Criminal Justice (Corruption Offences) Act 2018.

== New Zealand ==
Part 6 of the Crimes Act 1961 makes provision for crimes affecting the administration of law and justice.

== South Africa ==
Offences include

- Perjury
- Contempt of court
- Defeating or obstructing the course of justice

== United Kingdom ==
=== England and Wales ===
The fifth report of the Criminal Law Commissioners, dated 22 April 1840, classified offences against the administration of justice as offences against the executive power. The Justice of the Peace said that it seemed to them that offences against the administration of justice were entirely distinct from offences against the executive power.

=== Scotland ===
Offences include:

- Perjury
- Contempt of court
- Prison breaking
- Escape from lawful custody
- Escape from custody, contrary to section 91 of the Police and Fire Reform (Scotland) Act 2012

Deforcement was, by 2001, charged as aggravated assault.

== United States ==
Offences include:

- Perjury
- Contempt of court
- Offences of obstruction of justice under chapter 73 of 18 USC.
