= Administration of justice =

Process by which a legal system is executed

The administration of justice is the process by which the legal system of a government is executed. The presumed goal of such an administration is to provide justice for all those accessing the legal system.

== Australia ==
In Attorney General for New South Wales v Love (1898), the appellant argued that section 24 of the Act 9 Geo 4 c 83 did not have the effect applying the Nullum Tempus Act (9 Geo 3 c 16) (1768) to New South Wales. Counsel for the appellant said that Whicker v Hume (1858) decided that section 24 referred not to laws generally, but only to laws as to modes of procedure, and that the Nullum Tempus Act did not deal merely with procedure. The Lord Chancellor said that the Act 9 Geo 4 c 83 prima facie "applied the Nullum Tempus Act to the Colony in question as much as if it had re-enacted it for that Colony." He then said:

Sect. 24 of that Act provides "that all the laws and statutes in force within the realm of England at the passing of this Act" (that is to say, the year 1828) "shall be applied in the administration of justice in the courts of New South Wales," and it is sought by construction to limit the words "all laws and statutes" by introducing into the section the words "having relation to procedure" or some equivalent expression. At least that is the only intelligible mode in which the argument can be supported, because the words which do occur in the section - "in the administration of justice" - would certainly include a limitation of the time within which actions can be brought, and their Lordships are of the opinion that the language of the section cannot be limited so as to exclude the statute, which for the reasons pointed out by the learned judges were and are so important in the administration of justice in the Colony.

== Canada ==
Section 92(14) of the Constitution Act, 1867, also known as the Administration of Justice power, grants the provincial legislatures of Canada the authority to legislate on:

14. The Administration of Justice in the Province, including the Constitution, Maintenance, and Organization of Provincial Courts, both of Civil and of Criminal Jurisdiction, and including Procedure in Civil Matters in those Courts.

=== Ontario ===
Section 1 of the Administration of Justice Act (RSO 1990 c A6) provides:

In this Act, "administration of justice" means the provision, maintenance and operation of,

(a) the courts of justice of the Province of Ontario,
(b) land registry offices,
(c) jails, and
(d) the offices of coroners and Crown Attorneys,

for the performance of their functions, including any functions delegated to such courts, institutions or offices or any official thereof by or under any Act; (“administration de la justice”)

This provision was previously section 1 of the Administration of Justice Act (RSO 1980 c 6), which was previously section 1 of Administration of Justice Act (RSO 1970 c 6), which was previously section 1 of Administration of Justice Act 1968 (SO 1968 c 1) (17 Eliz 2 c 1). Queen's Printer copies of the Statutes of the province of Ontario 1968 describe this provision as "new". This statute replaced the Administration of Justice Expenses Act (RSO 1960 c 5).

== Ireland ==
"Offence against the Administration of Justice" is defined by section 7 of the Criminal Procedure Act 2010.

== United Kingdom ==
In England, the Administration of Justice is a prerogative of the Crown. It may be exercised only through duly-appointed judges and courts.

The following matters and things pertain to the Administration of Justice: the organisation of the courts; the prerogative of justice, the prerogative of mercy, and any prerogative power to create new courts; nolle prosequi; the appointment, tenure and immunity of judges; the immunity of other participants in legal proceedings; contempt of court; the composition and availability of juries, any requirement that their verdict be unanimous, and the allowances they receive; the branches of the legal profession; and the provision of legal aid and advice.

The Administration of Justice is an act which is normally associated with the carrying on of the business of government. When a government does that act, it is thereby exercising its sovereignty. It would accordingly be a violation of British sovereignty for a foreign government to do that act in British territory without authorisation. Section 2 of the Visiting Forces Act 1952 authorises foreign service courts to exercise their jurisdiction in the United Kingdom.

There are offences against the Administration of Justice.

For the purpose of section 54 of the Criminal Procedure and Investigations Act 1996, the following are Administration of Justice offences:

- The offence of perverting the course of justice
- The offence under section 51(1) of the Criminal Justice and Public Order Act 1994
- An offence of aiding, abetting, counselling, procuring, suborning or inciting another person to commit an offence under section 1 of the Perjury Act 1911.

The offence of perverting the course of justice has been referred to as "interfering with the Administration of Justice" and/or "obstructing the Administration of Justice".

Section 6(c) of the Contempt of Court Act 1981 provides that nothing in the foregoing provisions of that Act restricts liability for contempt of court in respect of conduct intended to impede or prejudice the Administration of Justice.

An arrestable offence, other than one specified in Schedule 5 to the Police and Criminal Evidence Act 1984, was serious for the purposes of that Act if it led to, or was intended or likely to lead to, amongst other things, serious interference with the Administration of Justice. An arrestable offence which consisted of making a threat was serious for the purposes of that Act if carrying out the threat would be likely to lead to, amongst other things, serious interference with the Administration of Justice.

In any legal proceedings held in public, the court may, where it appears to be necessary for avoiding a substantial risk of prejudice to the Administration of Justice in those proceedings, or in any other proceedings pending or imminent, order that the publication of any report of the proceedings, or any part of the proceedings, be postponed for such period as the court thinks necessary for that purpose.

Information which is not exempt information by virtue of section 30 of the Freedom of Information Act 2000 is exempt information if its disclosure under that Act would, or would be likely to, prejudice the Administration of Justice.

== Quotes ==
Roscoe Pound said: "Dissatisfaction with the administration of justice is as old as the law".

== See also ==
- Administration of Justice Act
- Open court principle

== Bibliography ==
- James, John S. "Administration". Stroud's Judicial Dictionary of Words and Phrases. Sweet & Maxwell. London. 1971. SBN 421 14290 1. Page 68.
- Bar Council. Code of Conduct for the Bar of England and Wales. 5th Edition. Paras 201(a)(ii) and (iii) and 202.
- G Glover Alexander. The Administration of Justice in Criminal Matters (In England and Wales). Cambridge University Press. First Published 1915. Reissued 1919. ISBN 978 0 521 18348 2. Google Books.
- William H Morley. The Administration of Justice in British India; Its Past History and Present State: Comprising an Account of the Laws Peculiar to India. Williams and Norgate. 1858. Google Books.
- Miller, John. On the Administration of Justice in the British Colonies in the East-Indies. Parbury, Allen and Co. London, Leadenhall Street. 1828. Google Books.
- "Contracts prejudicial to the Administration of Justice". T Anthony Downes. Textbook on Contract. Fourth Edition. Blackstone Press. 1995. Paragraph 8.7.3.2 at page 188.
