= Pope v. State =

Maryland Court of Appeals case

Pope v. State, 396 A.2d 1054 (Md 1979), was a case decided by the Court of Appeals of Maryland that abolished the common law offense of misprision of felony on the grounds of long non-use and excessive scope that rendered it incompatible with the jurisprudence of the state.
