= Anne Royall =

American writer (1769–1854)

- Born: Anne Newport; June 11, 1769; Baltimore, Maryland, US
- Died: October 1, 1854 (aged 85); Washington, D.C., US
- Resting place: Congressional Cemetery
- Occupations: Writer; editor; journalist
- Known for: first professional woman journalist in the U.S.
- Spouse: William Royall

Anne Royall (June 11, 1769 – October 1, 1854) was a travel writer, newspaper editor, and, by some accounts, the first professional female journalist in the United States. She was called a "common scold" for her sharp observations of American life.

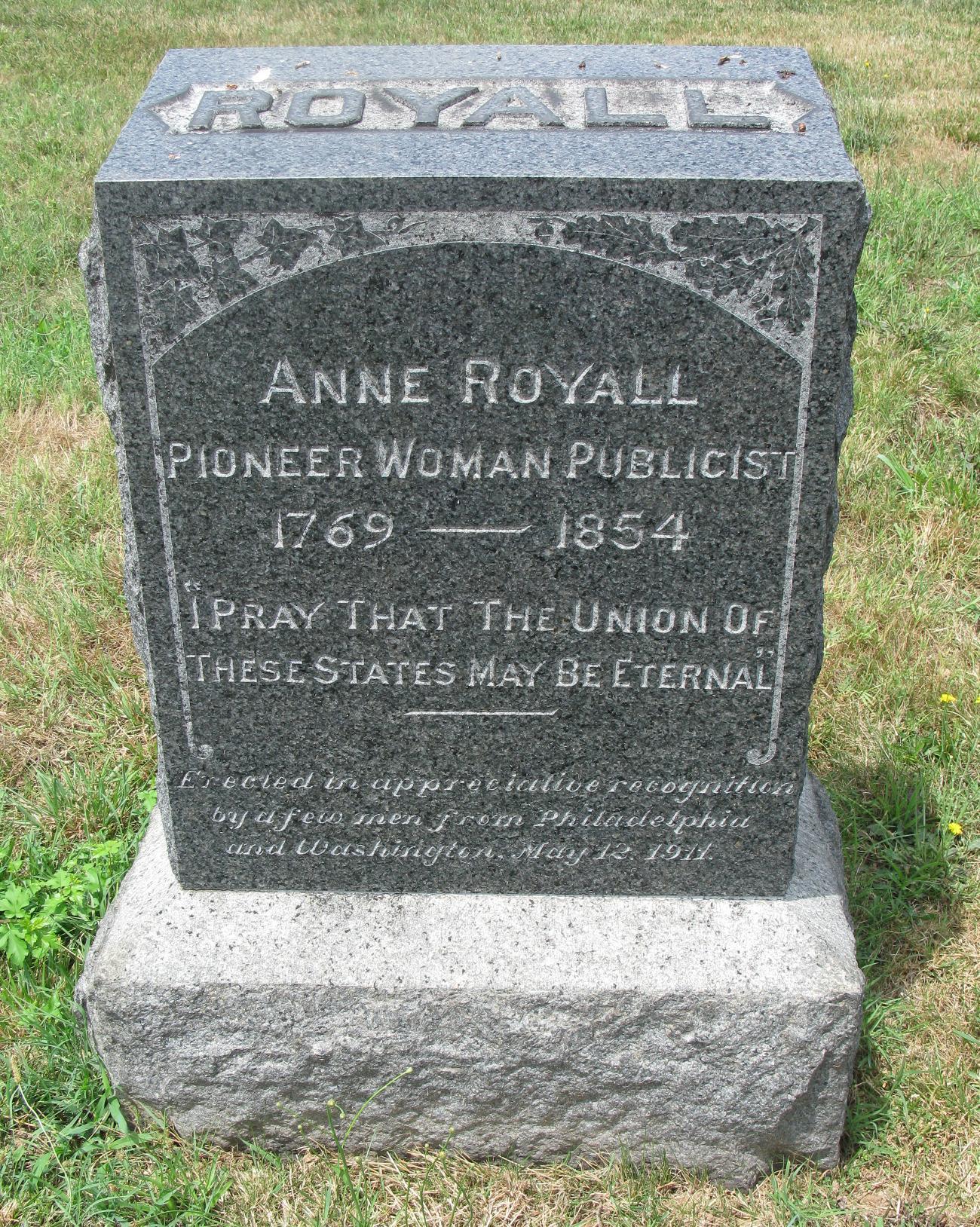
Headstone of Anne Royall in the Congressional Cemetery in Washington DC

== Early life ==
She was born Anne Newport in Baltimore, Maryland and grew up in an impoverished and fatherless family. At 16, she and her widowed mother moved from the frontier of Pennsylvania to the mountains of western Virginia, where they worked as servants for William Royall, a wealthy American Revolution major, freemason and deist who lived at Sweet Springs. Royall, a learned gentleman farmer twenty years Anne's senior, took an interest in her. He arranged for her education and offered free use of his extensive library, and trained her in the works of Shakespeare and Voltaire.

== Marriage ==
Anne and William Royall married in 1797. The couple spent 15 years living comfortably before William died in 1812, leaving Anne Royall a widow at age 43. To her surprise, Anne was denied inheritance by Royall's family. They claimed she was not Royall's legal wife, and waged a seven-year legal battle that they ultimately won. Anne was left virtually penniless.

== Career in journalism ==
Anne resorted to a life as an "itinerant storyteller". She traveled to Alabama and spent four years documenting the new state in letters to a friend, compiled into Letters from Alabama. It was the first in her "Black Books" series, "informative but sardonic portraits of the elite and their denizens from Mississippi to Maine". Anne Royall's incisive descriptions of American life and individual Americans from many walks of life were popular reading and a sharp contrast to the sentimental literature penned by other female writers. She also penned a novel called The Tennessean. In 1824, she set off for Washington D.C. to petition for a federal pension as the widow of a veteran.

Under pension law, widows were required to plead their cases before Congress. While Anne was in D.C. seeking a pension, she caught President John Quincy Adams during one of his usual early morning naked swims in the Potomac River. According to a likely apocryphal tale, she gathered the president's clothes and sat on them until he answered her questions, earning her the first presidential interview ever granted to a woman.

President Adams supported Anne in her pension protests, and invited her to visit his wife Louisa Adams at their home. Mrs. Adams gave her a white shawl when she journeyed north to obtain proof of her husband's military service.

=== Further travel reporting ===
Afterward Anne toured New England, Pennsylvania, New York and Massachusetts, all the while taking copious notes and using her Masonic connections to help fund her travels. In Boston, she stopped in on former President John Adams to give him an update on his son and daughter-in-law. Then, in 1826, at 57, she published her notes in a book titled Sketches of History, Life and Manners in the United States. Her previous manuscript The Tennessean would follow a year later.

The caustic observations in her books and public stances on issues caused a stir and earned her some powerful enemies. She was derided as an eccentric scold, a virago, and (in the words of one newspaper editor) "a literary wild-cat from the backwoods". In 1829, Anne Royall returned to Washington, D.C. and began living on Capitol Hill, near a fire house. The firehouse, which had been built with federal money, had been allowing a small Presbyterian congregation to use its facilities for their services. Royall, who had long made Presbyterians a particular object of scorn in her writing, objected to their using the building as a blurring of the lines between church and state. She also claimed that some of the congregation's children began throwing stones at her windows. One member of the congregation began praying silently beneath her window and others visited her in an attempt to convert her, she claimed. Royall responded to their taunts with cursing and was arrested. She was tried and convicted of being a "public nuisance, a common brawler and a common scold". Although a ducking stool had been constructed nearby, the court ruled that the traditional common law punishment of ducking for a scold was obsolete, and she was instead fined $10. Two reporters from Washington's newspaper, The National Intelligencer, paid the fine. Embarrassed by the incident, Royall left Washington to continue traveling.

=== Self-published newspaper and death ===
Back in Washington in 1831, she published a newspaper from her home with the help of a friend, Sally Stack. The paper, Paul Pry, exposed political corruption and fraud. Sold as single issues, it contained her editorials, letters to the editor and her responses, and advertisements. It was published until 1836, when it was succeeded by The Huntress. Royall hired orphans to set the type and faced constant financial woes, which were exacerbated when postmasters refused to deliver her issues to subscribers, until her death at 85 in 1854, bringing an end to her 30-year news career.

She is buried in the Congressional Cemetery.
