= Gillian Guess =

Canadian juror convicted of obstruction of justice

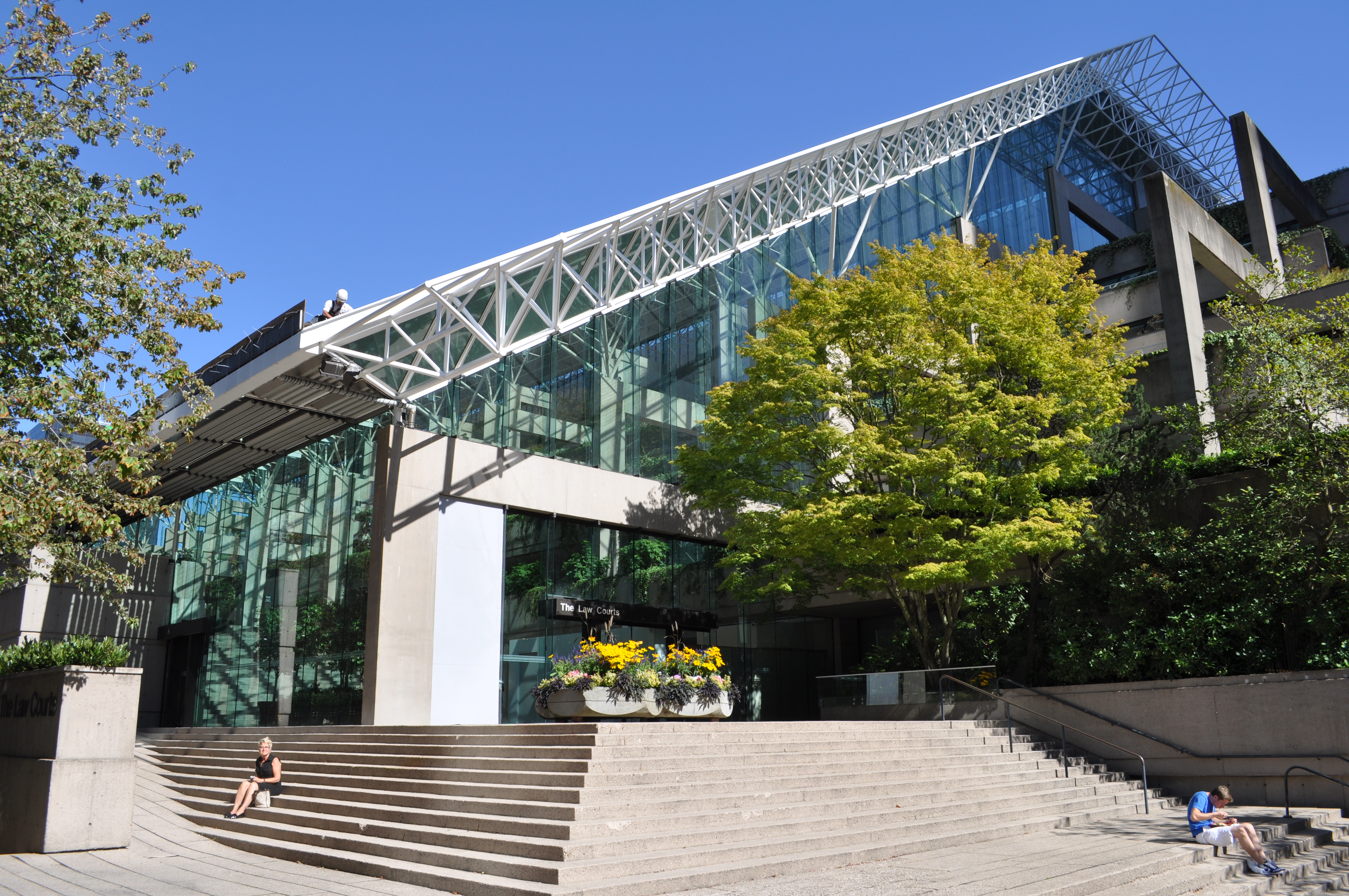
The Vancouver Law Courts, where the various trials and appeals took place

Gillian Guess (born 1955) is a woman from Vancouver, British Columbia, Canada, who was convicted in 1998 of obstruction of justice, based on her role as a juror in a murder trial in 1995. During the trial, she became sexually involved with one of the accused in the murder trial, Peter Gill. During their relationship he urged her to persuade the other jurors to acquit him. The jury eventually acquitted all accused, including Gill.

During the trial, court officials noticed unusual interactions between Gill and Guess and brought it to the attention of the trial judge, who warned Gill not to continue. After the acquittal, police were suspicious and monitored Guess, observing her dancing in a nightclub with Gill. The police also obtained wiretap recordings which provided evidence of the relationship.

In 1998, Guess was charged with obstruction of justice under the Criminal Code and tried in the Supreme Court of British Columbia before a judge and jury. The jury convicted her of the offence. The trial judge sentenced her to eighteen months of imprisonment, followed by probation for one year. The British Columbia Court of Appeal dismissed her appeals and upheld the conviction and sentence of imprisonment.

On a Crown appeal, the acquittals of Gill and two co-accused were set aside by the British Columbia Court of Appeal on the basis that the relationship between Gill and Guess had undermined the independence of the judicial process. Gill was not re-tried on the murder charge but he was charged and convicted of obstruction of justice. He received a sentence of just under six years imprisonment.

Judges who dealt with the case stated that it was unprecedented for a juror and an accused to have a sexual relationship during the trial. It is believed to be the first case in North America and the Commonwealth where a juror was convicted of wilful obstruction of justice in relation to their jury service. This was also the first case in Canada where jurors were authorized to testify about jury proceedings, which are normally strictly confidential.

== Relationship between Guess and Gill ==
In 1995, Guess was in her forties. She had two university degrees and was doing post-graduate studies in law and psychology. She was a counsellor with the RCMP for victims of crimes.

That year, she was summoned to serve as a juror in a complicated murder trial. Six individuals were on trial, including Peter (Preet) Gill. They were all charged with two counts of first degree murder. The Crown's case was that they were all involved in the illegal drug trade in Vancouver, and had killed two competitors in the drug trade. The trial lasted eight months, one of the longest in British Columbia history.

Guess later testified that she was quickly attracted to Gill, a man ten years her junior. She testified that at first she thought he was a lawyer, since he was well-dressed in a suit when in the courtroom, and only realised he was an accused when court was called to order. According to court clerk Emma Hyde, Guess would stare at Gill and "She would flip her hair and look seductive". Gill wrote in his diary that "I have the feeling somebody's watching me." In a later entry, he commented: "She's still making eye contact." On the other hand, Guess later testified that it was Gill who started making eye contact, but admitted she did nothing to stop it.

Gill was free on bail during the trial. At one point he approached Guess at a McDonald's and told her he was innocent of the charges. Sometime later, the two started to flirt outside the courtroom. Gill pursued the relationship, and Gill and Guess had an intimate conversation and kissed in Stanley Park. The relationship became sexual, with Gill coming to Guess's townhouse for sexual encounters.

Court officials informed the judge of the inappropriate courtroom behaviour. Judge Braidwood warned Gill about his behaviour, but he did not speak to Guess. The relationship continued, and when Guess asked Gill if she should find a way to get off the jury, he told her to stay. He also told her to convict two of his co-defendants, but not him.

At some point during the trial, Guess told her sister, and later two friends, about the sexual relationship. They all advised her to either break it off, or ask to be taken off the jury. Guess ignored their advice.

The case went to the jury in October 1995. According to the subsequent testimony of the other jurors, Guess was adamant that all the accused should be acquitted. One of the other jurors testified that Guess accused any juror who considered conviction as being racist, since the jury was all white and the accused were all persons of colour. Another juror testified that "I found her closed-minded, confrontational and not interested in other people's opinions". There is some suggestion that there were also cracks in the Crown's case and the testimony of key witnesses had been disproved. After a week of heated debate, the jury unanimously acquitted all six accused.

== Guess convicted of obstruction of justice ==
The police and the Crown prosecutors were aware of the unusual interactions in court, but were concerned that any attempt to investigate a juror or an accused during a trial could be seen as an interference with the judicial process. The British Columbia Court of Appeal subsequently commented that this was a valid concern, and the decision not to investigate during the trial was proper.

After the trial concluded, police began an investigation. A week after the acquittals, Guess and Gill were seen dancing together at a night club. Two weeks after the trial, the police observed Gill spending the night with Guess at her townhouse. The police received an authorisation to place secret listening devices in Guess's bedroom, and to tap her phone. They recorded her admitting to others, including her daughter, that she had been completely intoxicated by her relationship with Gill while she was a juror at his trial. The listening devices also recorded sexual encounters between Guess and Gill.

In 1998, the police laid an obstruction of justice charge against Guess, alleging she had violated s. 139(2) of the Criminal Code. Guess pled not guilty. She seemed to enjoy all the media attention she received during the trial, and she was determined to prove that she had done nothing illegal. She said, "After eight months even the trial judge started looking good." She also stated: "It didn't matter if I had sex with all the accused and everyone in the public gallery."

Jury deliberations are normally strictly confidential. In an unusual move, the Crown prosecutor indicated that he planned to call the jurors from the original trial, relying on an amendment Parliament had made to the Criminal Code in 1972 to allow jurors to be called when necessary to determine if the jury verdict was tainted by criminal behaviour. Guess's defence lawyer applied to the trial judge for an order barring the testimony of the former jurors. In a pre-trial ruling, the trial judge authorised calling the jurors as witnesses, based on the 1972 amendment.

At trial, the Crown called court officials who had been present at the trial, as well as the jurors from the trial. The court officials testified as to the unusual conduct they had observed in the courtroom. The former jurors gave evidence about Guess's conduct in the jury deliberations. They are believed to be the first jurors in Canada, the United States, or the Commonwealth to be called to testify about their deliberations in a criminal case.

Guess's defence was that she was able to render a fair verdict while also having a relationship with the accused. She also maintained that she truly believed from the start that Gill was innocent of the crimes.

The jury in Guess's case deliberated for fourteen hours before convicting her of obstruction of justice. After the jury verdict she said, "I have been convicted for falling in love and nothing more. I have not committed a crime."

In passing sentence, the trial judge strongly disagreed, stating that the vedict was "manifestly correct":

The evidence was and is overwhelming that the accused well knew and knows that she should not and could not continue to serve on the jury once the intimate relationship had started, and that to do so would taint and pervert the trial process.

He sentenced her to eighteen months in prison. She was released on electronic monitoring after serving three months in a minimum security women's facility.

Guess is believed to be the first juror in North America and the Commonwealth to be convicted of obstruction of justice in relation to their service on a jury. Judges who sat on the various aspects of the case commented that the case of a juror having sexual relations with an accused during trial was unprecedented and unusual.

== Subsequent proceedings ==
=== Appeals by Guess ===
Guess appealed both her conviction and sentence. The British Columbia Court of Appeal dismissed both appeals. The appeal from conviction was dismissed on October 12, 2000, while the sentence appeal was dismissed on November 2, 2000. During the sentence appeal, Justice Proudfoot commented that the case was exceptional, and went to the roots of the administration of justice. The court dismissed the sentence appeal from the bench the day of the hearing.

=== Crown appeal of acquittals ===
The Crown filed an appeal of the acquittals of Gill and two co-accused, Budai and Kim, with the British Columbia Court of Appeal. In a preliminary move, the Crown held a hearing in the British Columbia Supreme Court to establish the effect that Guess's conduct had on the jury process, calling Guess as a witness. The Crown was successful in entering that information as fresh evidence in the Court of Appeal.

The Crown's appeal was heard in February 2001. In May 2001, the British Columbia Court of Appeal allowed the Crown appeal, set aside the acquittals, and directed a retrial. The court stated that short of bribery, it was hard to think of a clearer example of breach of a juror's duty. The court held that Guess's impartiality was hopelessly compromised. Gill turned himself in to the police following the decision. Gill, Budai, and Kim all applied to the Supreme Court of Canada to appeal the decision of the Court of Appeal, but the Supreme Court refused leave to appeal.

The Crown did not retry the three on the murder charges.

=== Gill convicted of obstruction of justice ===
At the same time as the Crown appeal against Gill was going ahead, he was charged with obstruction of justice in connection to the jury trial. Guess testified against him at the trial, confirming the sexual relationship. She admitted that she had earlier denied there was any sexual relationship during the trial, but stated she was done lying for Gill. Gill was convicted of obstruction of justice and was sentenced to five years and ten months imprisonment.

== Media coverage ==
Guess's trial became a media sensation, with reporters coming from as far away as Germany and New Zealand to cover it. Her story was told on the news magazine show Inside Edition, and on the ABC News Show 20/20. Guess was also photographed for Marie Claire magazine. In 1998, Guess wrote a letter to the editor of The Peak, the Simon Fraser University campus newspaper, complimenting the paper on an article about her.

Her story was the subject of a 2004 movie, The Love Crimes of Gillian Guess, and was the basis of the Law & Order episode "Hubris".
