= State v. Palendrano =

- Court: New Jersey Superior Court
- Full case name: State of New Jersey v. Marion Palendrano, Defendant.
- Decided: July 13, 1972
- Citation: 293 A.2d 747; 120 N.J. Super. 336

Case opinions
- Decision by: McGann

Keywords
- Sexism; Vagueness doctrine; Women's rights

State v. Palendrano, 120 N.J. Super. 336, 293 A.2d 747 (Law Div. 1972), was a legal case decided by the New Jersey Superior Court, Law Division, holding that the common law offense of being a common scold was no longer a crime despite the presence of reception statutes in the state.

== Background ==
In 1970, Marion Palendrano was indicted in Monmouth County for assault, threatening a person's life, and being a scold.

== Decision ==
The court reasoned that the offense was superseded by the New Jersey Disorderly Persons Act. They also expressed concerns that a female-only crime violated due process and the nature of the offense was too vague. It was also opined that the punishment of ducking could amount to a corpor(e)al punishment, in which case that punishment was unlawful under the New Jersey Constitution of 1844 or since 1776.

== See also ==
- Commonwealth v. Donoghue, an earlier Kentucky case which upheld common law offenses in that state.
