= Chinese water torture =

Torture method

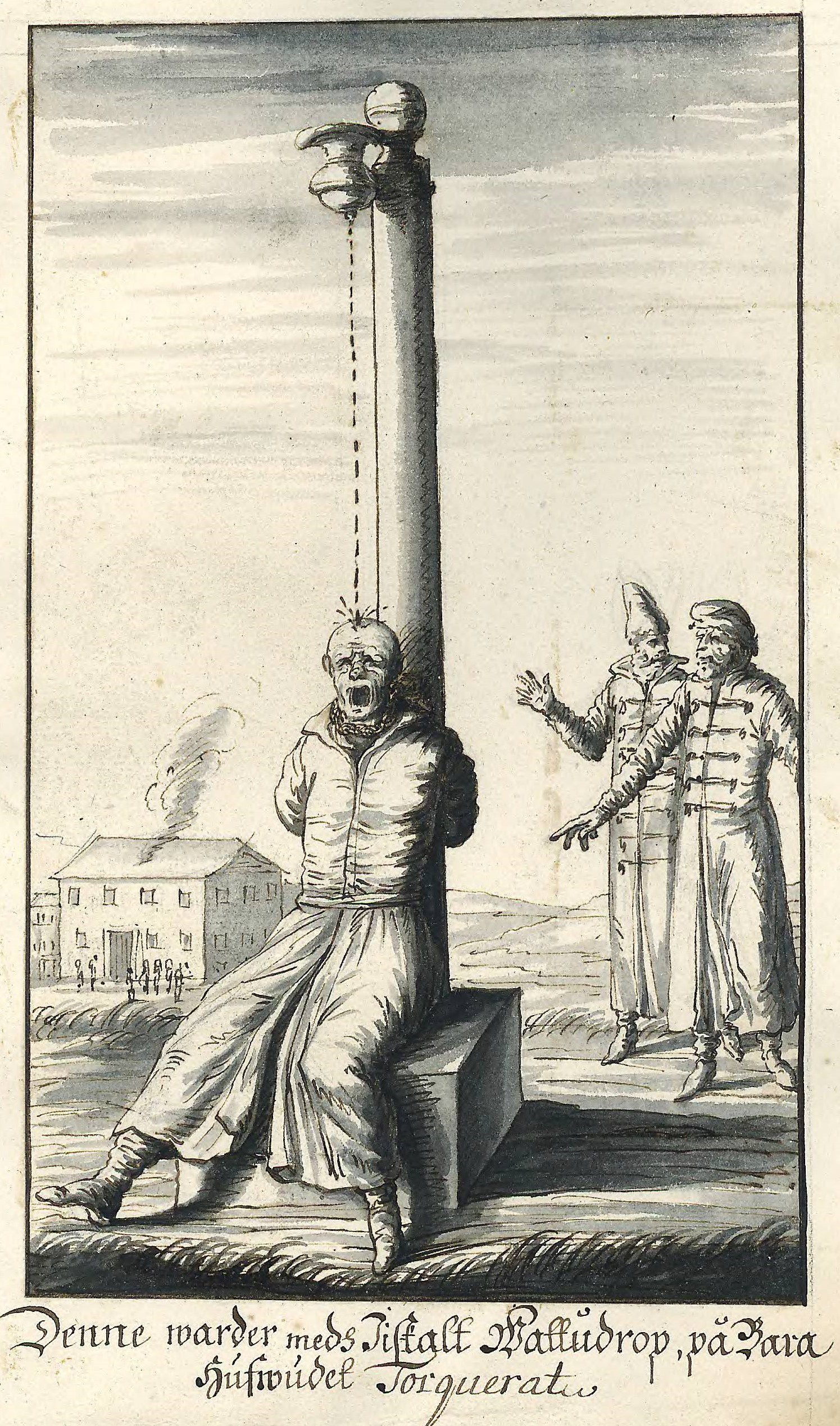
"This [man] gets tortured with poisonous water-dripping on his bare head." 1674.

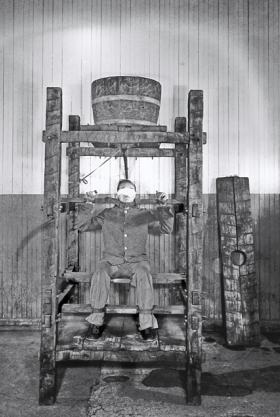
A victim of Chinese water torture at Sing Sing Prison in Ossining, New York

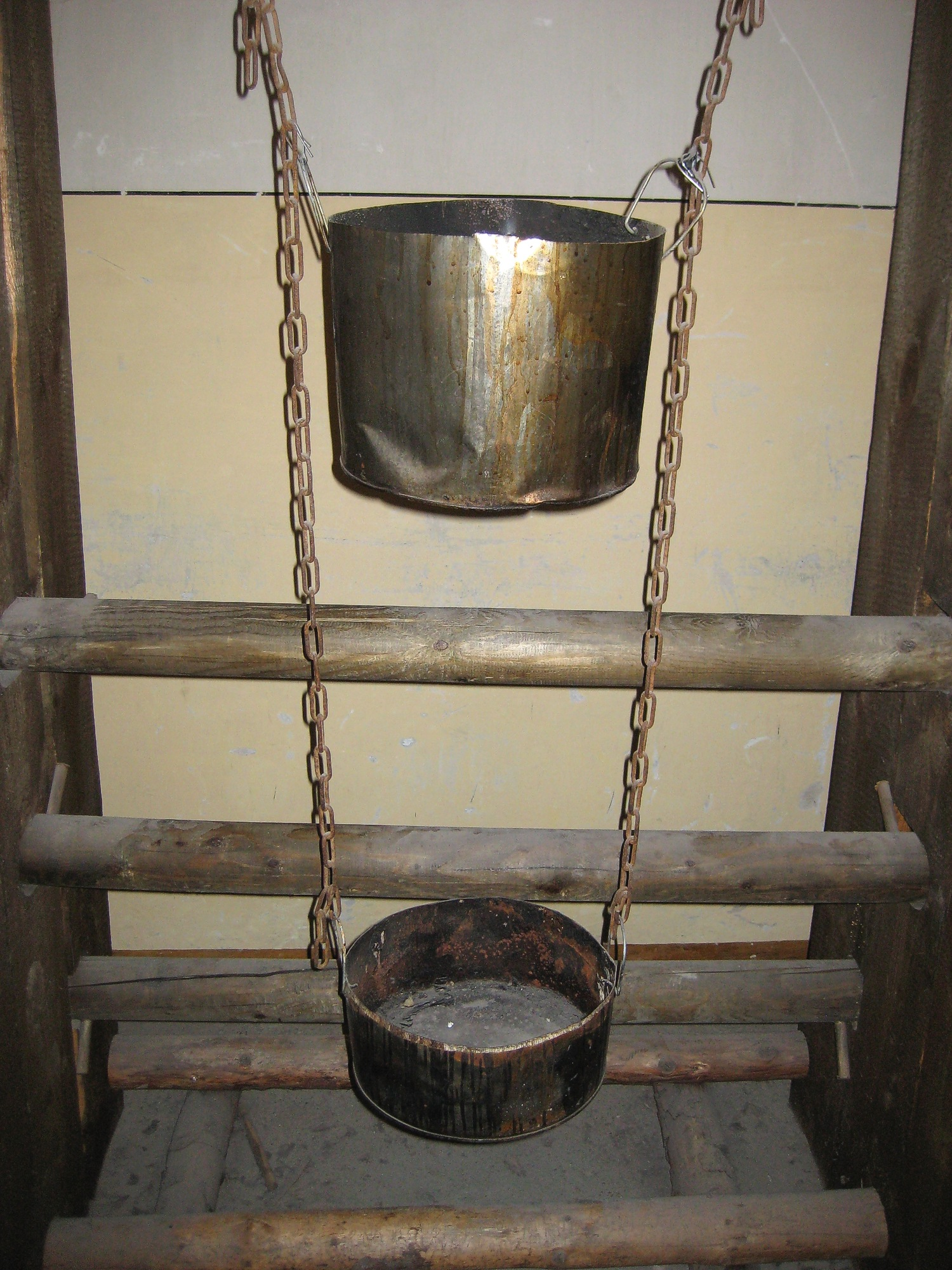
A reproduction of a Chinese water torture apparatus at Berlin-Hohenschönhausen Memorial

Chinese water torture, or use of a dripping machine, is a psychological torture tactic in which cold water is slowly dripped onto the victim's scalp, forehead or face for a prolonged period of time. The process causes fear and mental deterioration of the subject. The pattern of the drops is often irregular, and the cold sensation is jarring, which causes anxiety as the victim tries to anticipate the next drip.

Despite the name, it is not a Chinese invention and it is not traditional anywhere in Asia. Its earliest known version was first documented by Hippolytus de Marsiliis in Bologna (now in Italy) in the late 15th or early 16th century, and it was widely used in Western countries before being popularized by Harry Houdini in the early 20th century.

== Origin ==
"Chinese water torture" is mentioned in the 1884 short story "The Compromiser," suggesting some public familiarity with the term by that date. It may have been popularised by the predicament escape Chinese Water Torture Cell (a feat of escapology introduced in Berlin at Circus Busch on September 13, 1910). The escape entailed Harry Houdini being bound and suspended upside-down in a locked glass and steel cabinet full to overflowing with water, from which he escaped. There were also the Fu Manchu stories by Sax Rohmer that were popular in the 1930s (in which Fu Manchu subjected his victims to various ingenious tortures, such as the wired jacket).

Hippolytus de Marsiliis is credited with the invention of a form of water torture. Having observed how drops of water falling one by one on a stone gradually created a hollow, he applied the method to the human body. Other suggestions say that the term "Chinese water torture" was invented merely to grant the method a sense of ominous mystery. The victim would be stripped of their clothes for public humiliation and then tortured to madness while bystanders watched and mocked them.

== Effectiveness ==
There is very little evidence pertaining to the effectiveness of torture for interrogation purposes. The water torture method itself causes lasting mental damage in victims proportional to the intensity of exposure. In addition to mental deterioration, a common side effect of undergoing Chinese water torture is psychosis, when victims experience delusions and hallucinations, losing touch with reality.

When the television series MythBusters investigated the effectiveness of Chinese water torture, it was found quite effective in producing distress, but the restraining equipment provided most of the effect by itself. When tested alone on a relaxed, unrestrained subject, the dripping water was found almost negligible. Nevertheless, the MythBusters host Adam Savage later said in the web television series Mind Field, "The creepiest thing that happened after we did this episode was that I got an e-mail from someone from a throwaway account. He said 'We found that randomizing when the drops occurred was incredibly effective.' That anything that happens on a regular periodicity can become a type of meditation and you can then tune it out. If you couldn’t predict it, [...] he said, 'we found we were able to induce a psychotic break within twenty hours.'"

In 2012, the Australian artist Lottie Consalvo performed Chinese water torture for an art project, Steer a Steady Ship, to represent her emotions after her sister's passing. Whilst lying under the drips of water, she felt the presence of her deceased sister lying beside her. In the article that explains Consalvo's experience during the performance, "Australian Artist Recreates Chinese Water Torture", the author states, "She came to the idea of Chinese water torture, which can cause psychosis, through its association with the head, which for her represents the physicality of the mind – something she believes is 'more physical than anything in life.'"

== See also ==
- Corporal punishment
- Insanity
- Water cure
