= Hippolytus de Marsiliis =

Italian lawyer (1451–1529)

- Born: 1451; Bologna, Italy
- Died: 1529 (aged 77–78); Bologna, Italy
- Occupation: Lawyer

Hippolytus de Marsiliis (1451–1529) was a lawyer and doctor utriusque iuris (Lat. 'doctor of either law' — one who studied civil as well as canon law). He received his doctorate in 1480 but the date at which he became a lawyer is unknown. Throughout his life, he wrote many repetitiones and notabilia on many canons and decretals. In addition, he taught Roman law beginning in the year 1482. He is best known for documenting the Chinese water torture method, in which drops of water would consistently fall on a victim's forehead, causing the victim to go insane. He also was the first person to document sleep deprivation as a means of torture, wherein the interrogators would repeat same questions, shaking the victim at random intervals, pricking him with a sharp pin, or forcing him to march down a hallway endlessly. If the interrogators grew weary, they would switch out with another group, who then would ask the same questions (today police use this method, but it is known as the third degree).

== Works ==
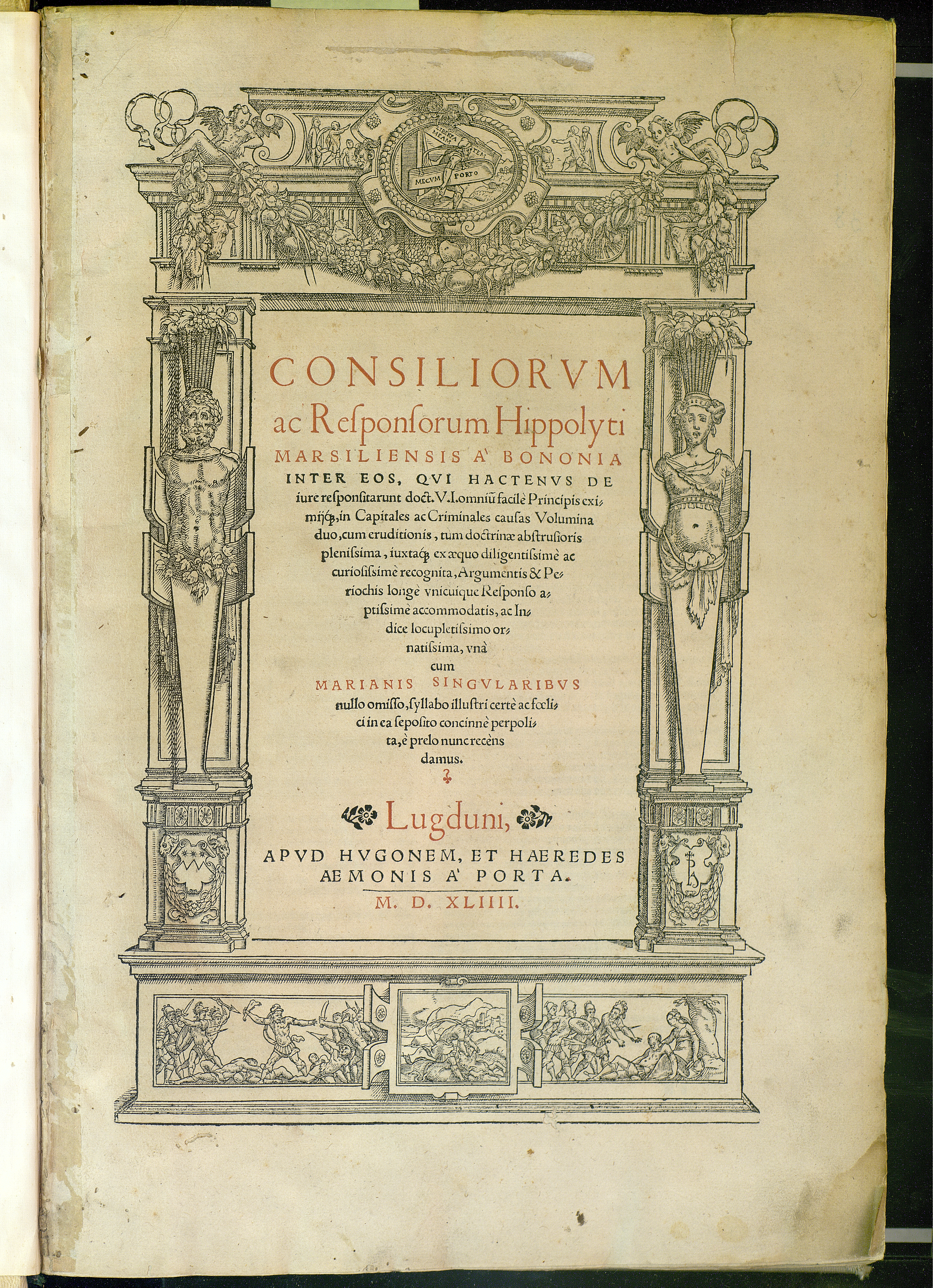
Consilia, 1544

- Singularia seu notabilia, earliest recorded print, Milan, 1512
- Tractatus de questionibus, in quo materie maleficiorum pertractant(ur), 1524
  - Singularia (in Latin). Lyon: Jacques Giunta. 1535.
- Consilia (in Latin). Lyon: Hugue de La Porte & héritiers Aymon de La Porte. 1544.
- Practica criminalis (in Latin). Lyon: Jacques Giunta. 1538.
  - Practica criminalis (in Latin). Venice: Bartolomeo Rubini. 1574.
- Repetitiones in uniuersas fere iuris canonici III, earliest recorded print, Venice, 1587
