= Outraging public decency =

Common law offence

Outraging public decency is a common law offence in England and Wales, Hong Kong and the Australian states of New South Wales and Victoria.

It is punishable by unlimited imprisonment and/or an unlimited fine. But in Hong Kong, as a common law offence, offenders can only be imprisoned for 7 years at maximum.

== History ==
The first recorded case of the offence was Sir Charles Sedley’s Case or namely Sedley's Case (1663) 1 Keb. 620, 83 ER 1146; (1663) 1 Sid. 168, 82 ER 1036. Sir Charles Sedley was prosecuted for urinating on a crowd from the balcony of Oxford Kate's tavern in Covent Garden. Samuel Pepys' diary recorded Sedley's acts in detail:

Sir Charles Sydly ... [came] in open day into the Balcone and showed his nakedness, ... and abusing of scripture and as it were from thence preaching a mountebank sermon from the pulpit, saying that there he had to sell such a powder as should make all the [women] in town run after him, 1000 people standing underneath to see and hear him.

And that being done he took a glass of wine … and then drank it off, and then took another and drank the King’s health.

— Samuel Pepys, Wednesday 1 July 1663

Sedley's Case was the very first case brought to trial under the premise of regulating immoral behaviours. After hearing the case, the King's Bench established itself as the primary custos morum of the British Empire due to the abolition of the Star Chamber a few years prior.

== Definition ==
Modern case law has established two elements that must be satisfied for the offence to have been committed:

1. the act was of such a lewd character as to outrage public decency; this element constitutes the nature of the act, which has to be proved before the offence can be established, and
2. the act took place in a public place and must have been capable of being seen by two or more persons who were actually present, even if they did not actually see it.

The mens rea of this offence can be satisfied if the defendant intentionally does an act which outrages public decency, regardless of one's state of mind.

Judge Peter Rook QC and Robert Ward suggest that obiter dicta in cases such as R v Thallman (1863) 9 Cox CC 388 indicate that the requirement of a "public place" may be falling out of favour, due to its vagueness and redundancy to the requirement for two potential witnesses.

In R v Hamilton [2007] EWCA Crim 2062 an act of upskirting in public went undetected until a police search discovered indecent images. It was held that it was immaterial whether a person had actually seen the act, provided it was capable of being seen by at least two persons. Previous cases had all been seen, but this was held to be a matter of evidence, not an element of the offence.

== Usage ==
The offence is currently prosecuted around 400–500 times per year in England and Wales.

== Notable criminal prosecutions ==
=== The foetus earrings case ===
In December 1987, artist Rick Gibson exhibited a pair of earrings made with freeze-dried human foetuses at the Young Unknowns Gallery in London. On 3 December 1987 the earrings were seized by the police.

On 11 April 1988, Gibson and the gallery owner Peter Sylveire were formally charged with the common law offences of exhibiting a public nuisance and outraging public decency. This was the first occasion on which the charge of outraging public decency had been preferred in more than 80 years.

The trial started on 30 January 1989. On 6 February 1989 the public nuisance charge was dismissed.

The defence raised a point of law, that "outraging public decency" was no longer known in law so long after the last occasion on which the charge had been preferred. The judge ruled that it could still be preferred no matter how long the hiatus, provided the facts fitted the offence. On 9 February 1989 the jury found Gibson and Sylveire guilty of outraging public decency. Gibson was fined £500 and Sylveire was fined £300.

The defence appealed on the point of the validity of the charge of outraging public decency, which was dismissed by the Court of Appeal, which upheld the trial judge's ruling and went some way to restating the law in this area.
