= Tumbrel =

Two-wheeled cart or wagon

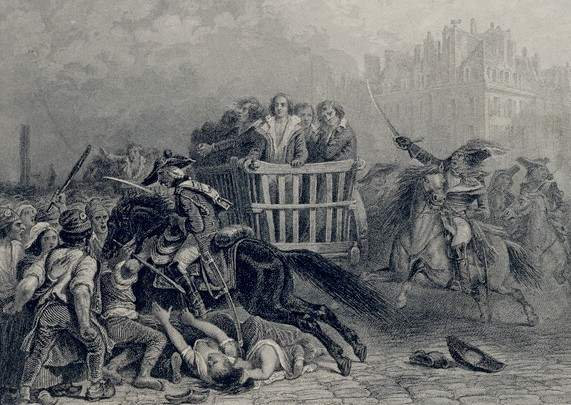
Nineteenth-century illustration of a tumbrel conveying prisoners to the guillotine

A tumbrel (also tumbril and originally tomberel) is a two-wheeled cart or wagon typically designed to be hauled by a single horse or ox. Their original use was for agricultural work; in particular they were associated with carrying manure.

Their most infamous use was taking prisoners to the guillotine during the French Revolution. They were also used by the military for hauling supplies. In this use, the carts were sometimes covered. The two wheels allowed the cart to be tilted to discharge its load more easily. Many tumbrels also had hinged tailboards for the same reason.

The word is also used as a name for the ducking stool and for a type of balancing scale used in medieval times to check the weight of coins.
