= Misprision =

Failure to report a crime

The term misprision (from Old French: mesprendre, modern French: se méprendre 'to misunderstand') in English law describes certain kinds of offence. Writers on criminal law usually divide misprision into two kinds: negative and positive.

It survives in the law of England and Wales and Northern Ireland only in the term misprision of treason.

== Negative misprision ==
Negative misprision is the concealment of treason or felony. By the common law of England, it was the duty of every liege subject (vassal) to inform the king's justices and other officers of the law of all treasons and felonies of which the informant had knowledge, and to bring the offender to justice by arrest (see Sheriffs Act 1887, s. 8). The duty fell primarily on the grand jurors of each county borough or franchise (until the abolition of grand juries in 1933), and is performed by indictment or presentment, but it also falls in theory on all other inhabitants. Failure by the latter to discharge this public duty constitutes what is known as misprision of treason or misprision of felony.

Misprision of treason, in the words of Blackstone, "[consists] in the bare knowledge and concealment of treason, without any degree of assent thereto: for any assent makes the party a principal traitor". According to Bracton, de Corona, seq. 118, failure to reveal the treason of another was in itself high treason, but statutes of 1551–1552 and 1554–1555 made concealment of treason misprision only. Most of the statutes regulating procedure on trials for treason also apply to misprision of treason. The punishment is loss of the profit of the lands of the offender during life, forfeiture of all his goods and imprisonment for life. These punishments are not affected by the Forfeiture Act 1870.

Misprision of felony is the concealment of a felony committed by another person, but without such previous concert with, or subsequent assistance of the offender, as would make the concealer an accessory to the crime before or after the fact. The offence was (and in the United States still is) a misdemeanour punishable on indictment by fine and imprisonment.

Under the old common law hierarchy of crimes (as treasons, felonies and misdemeanours), misprision of treason was a felony and misprision of felony was a misdemeanour. (There was no such offence as misprision of a misdemeanour.) Misprision was punished under common law by the seizure of all wealth and that of the family as well as serving in prison for the remainder of life.

In the United States, misprision of treason (18 U.S.C. § 2382) is defined to be the crime committed by a person owing allegiance to the United States, and having knowledge of the commission of any treasonous crime against them, who conceals and does not, as soon as may be, disclose and make known the same to the president or to some judge of the United States, or to the governor, or to some judge or justice of a particular state. The punishment is imprisonment for not more than seven years and a fine of not more than one thousand dollars.

The United States Code also includes misprision of felony (18 U.S.C. § 4).

== Positive misprision ==
Positive misprision is the doing of something which ought not to be done; or the commission of a serious offence falling short of treason or felony, in other words of a misdemeanour of a public character (e.g. maladministration of high officials, contempt of the sovereign or magistrates). To endeavour to dissuade a witness from giving evidence, to disclose an examination before the privy council, or to advise a prisoner to stand mute, used to be described as misprisions (Hawk. P. C. bk. I. c. 20).

The old writers say that a misprision is contained in every felony and that the Crown may elect to prosecute for the misprision instead of the felony. This proposition merely affirms the right of the Crown to choose a more merciful remedy in certain cases, and has no present value in the law. Positive misprisions are now only of antiquarian interest, being treated as misdemeanours.

== Statutory offences similar to negative misprision ==
None of the following offences are described as misprision, but they have a similar scope.

=== United Kingdom ===
==== Terrorism ====
Section 38B of the Terrorism Act 2000 (c.11) creates the offence of failure to disclose information that might prevent an act of terrorism or secure the apprehension, prosecution or conviction of a person for an offence involving the commission, preparation or instigation of an act of terrorism. The maximum sentence was increased from five years to ten years in 2019.

Section 19 of the same Act creates an offence of failure to disclose a belief or suspicion that a person has committed an offence under sections 15 to 18 of that Act if that belief or suspicion arises from information acquired in the course of employment or professional work. The maximum sentence is still five years.

=== England and Wales ===
In England and Wales, there is no longer a positive obligation on a person who is aware of an offence having been committed to report it. However, section 5(1) of the Criminal Law Act 1967 provides that if a person knows or believes that a "relevant offence" has been committed, and they have information which might be useful in prosecuting the person who committed it, then if they accept any consideration in return for not disclosing that information, they commit the offence of concealing an offence. There is an exception for "making good of loss or injury caused by the offence", and for "the making of reasonable compensation for that loss or injury". In this context, "relevant offence" means one for which the sentence is fixed by law, such as murder, or where a prison sentence of five years or more can be given.

=== Northern Ireland ===
==== Arrestable offences ====
Sections 5(1) and (2) of the Criminal Law Act (Northern Ireland) 1967 (c.18) (N.I.) creates the offence of failure to disclose information which might secure the apprehension, prosecution or conviction of a person for an arrestable offence.

== Other jurisdictions and meanings ==
United States law defines misprision of felony as a federal crime. If one knows that one is a target of a Federal investigation, it is illegal under the Sarbanes–Oxley Act to erase one's browser history intentionally. Khairullozhan Matanov was prosecuted for erasing computer records about his friends, Dhzokar and Tamerlan Tsarnaev; he pleaded guilty to a lesser included offense in 2015.

The term misprision can also be applied in some legal systems to a wilful act or omission by a person who is involved in or has knowledge of the facts of a crime, which results in an innocent person being punished for the crime; e.g., a frameup.

In some jurisdictions, such as New York and the military justice system, misprision also refers to the "intent to cause a false impression", for example, for the sale of fake drugs, such as oregano instead of marijuana.
