= Compounding a felony =

Former common law offence

Compounding a felony was an offence under the common law of England and was classified as a misdemeanour. It consisted of a prosecutor or victim of an offence accepting anything of value under an agreement not to prosecute, or to hamper the prosecution of, a felony. To "compound", in this context, means to come to a settlement or agreement. It is not compounding for the victim to accept an offer to return stolen property, or to make restitution, as long as there is no agreement not to prosecute.

Compounding has been replaced by statutory provision in numerous jurisdictions that recognize common law offences:

- England and Wales, replaced with concealing certain offences or giving false information
- Northern Ireland
- The Republic of Ireland
- New South Wales

Compounding a misdemeanour is not an offence at common law. However, an agreement not to prosecute a misdemeanor is unenforceable as being contrary to public policy.

== See also ==
- Compounding treason, same sense of "compounding" applied to the crime of treason
- Misprision of felony, failing to report knowledge of a felony
- Theftbote, private arrangement between felon and victim, to obviate fines due to the King
- Perverting the course of justice, common-law offence
- Settlement (litigation), permitted in civil law
