= Misprision of felony =

Failure to report a felony

Misprision of felony is a form of misprision, and an offence under the common law of England that is no longer active in many common law countries. Where it was or is active, it is classified as a misdemeanor. It consists of failing to report knowledge of a felony to the appropriate authorities. Exceptions were made for close family members of the felon and where the disclosure would tend to incriminate the reporter himself.

With the development of the modern law, this crime has been discarded in many jurisdictions, and is generally only applied against persons placed in a special position of authority or responsibility. In this case, the offence of misfeasance in public office or malfeasance in public office may be considered instead. For example, corrections officers who stand idly by while drug trafficking occurs within the prison may be prosecuted for this crime.

It has been abolished in:

- England, Wales and Scotland, as part of the criminal law reforms that abolished the distinction between misdemeanor and felony in the Criminal Law Act 1967 (c. 58), section 1
- Northern Ireland, with the Criminal Law Act (Northern Ireland) 1967—(c. 18) (N.I.), section 1
- Ireland, with the Criminal Law Act 1997—(No. 14), section 3
- New South Wales, Australia, with the Crimes Act 1900—section 341

In some cases, misprision has been replaced by a more tightly defined statutory offence. For example, in England and Wales, the 1967 Act states that a person who has information which might lead to the prosecution of an arrestable offence—and who agrees to accept consideration in exchange for not disclosing it—is liable on conviction on indictment to imprisonment.

== United States federal law ==
Misprision of felony remains an offense under United States federal law having been enacted in 1790 and codified in 1909 under 18 U.S.C. § 4:

Whoever, having knowledge of the actual commission of a felony cognizable by a court of the United States, conceals and does not as soon as possible make known the same to some judge or other person in civil or military authority under the United States, shall be fined under this title or imprisoned not more than three years, or both.

US courts have held that misprision of felony requires active concealment of a known felony rather than simple failure to report it.

Under the Sarbanes–Oxley Act, it is illegal for anyone who is aware of being a target of a federal investigation to intentionally erase browser history on a computer. Khairullozhan Matanov was prosecuted for erasing computer records about his friends, Dzhokhar and Tamerlan Tsarnaev; he pleaded guilty to a lesser included offense in 2015.

The federal misprision of felony statute is usually used only in prosecutions against defendants who have a special duty to report a crime, such as a government official.

== See also ==
- Compounding a felony
- Felony
- Inchoate offense
- Misprision
- Misprision of treason
- Pope v. State
