= List of English criminal offences =

This list of English criminal offences is a partial categorization of English criminal law offences.

== Offences against property ==
- Offences under the Explosive Substances Act 1883
- Offences under the Computer Misuse Act 1990

== Firearms and offensive weapons ==
- Offences under section 1(1) of the Prevention of Crime Act 1953
- Offences under sections 139 and 139A of the Criminal Justice Act 1988
- Offences under the Knives Act 1997

== Forgery, personation and cheating ==
See forgery:

- Offences under Part I of the Forgery and Counterfeiting Act 1981
- Falsification of pedigree, contrary to section 183(1)(b) of the Law of Property Act 1925
- Improper alteration of the registers, contrary to section 124 of the Land Registration Act 2002
- Offences under section 8 of the Non-Parochial Registers Act 1840
- Offences under sections 36 and 37 of the Forgery Act 1861
- Forgery of passport, contrary to section 36 of the Criminal Justice Act 1925
- Offences under sections 133 and 135 of the County Courts Act 1984
- Offences under section 13 of the Stamp Duties Management Act 1891; and supplementary offences under sections 14 and 15
- Offences under section 6 of the Hallmarking Act 1973
- Offences under section 126 of the Mental Health Act 1983
- Offences under sections 121 and 122(6) of the Gun Barrel Proof Act 1868

Motor vehicle document offences:

- Offences under section 97AA and 99(5) of the Transport Act 1968
- Offences under section 65 of the Public Passenger Vehicles Act 1981
- Offences under section 115 of the Road Traffic Regulation Act 1984
- Offences under section 173 of the Road Traffic Act 1988
- Offences under regulations 11(1) to (3) of the Motor Vehicles (E.C. Type Approval) Regulations 1992 (S.I. 1992/3107) made under section 2(2) of the European Communities Act 1972
- Offences under section 44 of the Vehicles Excise and Registration Act 1994
- Offences under regulations 10(1) to (3) the Motor Cycle (E.C. Type Approval) Regulations 1995 (S.I. 1995/1531) made under section 2(2) of the European Communities Act 1972
- Offences under section 38 of the Goods Vehicles (Licensing of Operators) Act 1995

See personation:

- Personation of a juror
- Offences under section 90(1) of the Police Act 1996
- Offences under section 30(1) of the Commissioners for Revenue and Customs Act 2005
- Offences under section 34 of the Forgery Act 1861
- Offences under section 24 of the Family Law Reform Act 1969
- Offences under section 60 of the Representation of the People Act 1983

See cheating:

- Offences under section 17 of the Gaming Act 1845
- Offences under section 1 of the Fraudulent Mediums Act 1951

== Offences against the state ==
- High treason
- Misprision of treason
- Compounding treason
- Treason felony
- Attempting to injure or alarm the Sovereign, contrary to section 2 of the Treason Act 1842
- Contempt of the sovereign
- Trading with the enemy
- Offences under the Official Secrets Acts 1911 to 1989
- Offences under the Incitement to Disaffection Act 1934
- Causing disaffection, contrary to section 91 of the Police Act 1996
- Causing disaffection, contrary to section 6 of the Ministry of Defence Police Act 1987
- Incitement to sedition or disaffection or promoting industrial unrest, contrary to section 3 of the Aliens Restriction (Amendment) Act 1919
- Offences of procuring and assisting desertion under military law
- Offences relating to terrorism
- Offences of directing quasi military organizations and wearing uniforms for political purposes under the Public Order Act 1936
- Piracy iure gentium
- Piracy with violence, contrary to the Piracy Act 1837
- Offences under the Slave Trade Act 1824
- Offences under the Foreign Enlistment Act 1870
- Offences under the Immigration Act 1971
- Coinage offences under Part II of the Forgery and Counterfeiting Act 1981
- Offences relating to public stores under the Public Stores Act 1875
- Offences relating to military stores under military law
- Offences against postal and electronic communication services
- Misconduct in public office
- Refusal to execute public office
- Offences of selling public offices under the Sale of Offices Act 1551 and Sale of Offices Act 1809
- Purchasing the office of clerk of the peace or under-sheriff, contrary to section 27 of the Sheriffs Act 1887
- Cheating the public revenue
- Offences under the Customs and Excise Management Act 1979
- Tax evasion and money laundering offences

See also Offences against military law in the United Kingdom

== Harmful or dangerous drugs ==
- Offences under the Misuse of Drugs Act 1971, the Intoxicating Substances (Supply) Act 1985, the Licensing Act 2003, section 7 of the Children and Young Persons Act 1933 and other provisions relating to tobacco, and the Drug Trafficking Act 1994.
- Offences under the Psychoactive Substances Act 2016.

== Offences against religion and public worship ==
- Offences under sections 75 to 77 of the Marriage Act 1949

Offences of disturbing public worship

- Offences under section 2 of the Ecclesiastical Courts Jurisdiction Act 1860
- Offences under section 7 of the Burial Laws Amendment Act 1880
- Offences under section 59 of the Cemeteries Clauses Act 1847
- Offences under articles 18 and 19 of the Local Authorities' Cemeteries Order 1977 (SI 1977/204)

== Offences against the administration of public justice ==
- Doing an act tending and intended to pervert the course of public justice - a.k.a. perverting the course of justice, defeating the ends of justice, obstructing the administration of justice
- Concealing evidence, contrary to section 5(1) of the Criminal Law Act 1967
- Contempt of court a.k.a. criminal contempt
- Intimidation, contrary to section 51(1) of the Criminal Justice and Public Order Act 1994
- Taking or threatening to take revenge, contrary to section 51(2) of the Criminal Justice and Public Order Act 1994
- Perjury, contrary to section 1 of the Perjury Act 1911
- Perjury, contrary to section 6 of the Piracy Act 1850
- Offences under sections 2 to 4 of the Perjury Act 1911
- Making a false statutory declaration, contrary to section 5 of the Perjury Act 1911
- Offences under section 6 of the Perjury Act 1911
- Fabrication of false evidence
- Offences under section 89 of the Criminal Justice Act 1967
- Offences under 106 of the Magistrates' Courts Act 1980
- Offences under section 11(1) of the European Communities Act 1972
- Escape
- Permitting an escape
- Assisting a prisoner to escape, contrary to section 39 of the Prison Act 1952
- Breach of prison/breaking prison
- Rescue/rescuing a prisoner in custody
- Harboring an escaped prisoner, contrary to section 22(2) of the Prison Act 1952
- Taking part in a prison mutiny, contrary to section 1(1) of the Prison Security Act 1992
- Offences under section 128 of the Mental Health Act 1983
- Causing a wasteful employment of the police, contrary to section 5(2) of the Criminal Law Act 1967
- Administering an unlawful oath, contrary to section 13 of the Statutory Declarations Act 1835

== Public order offences ==
- Offences under the Public Order Act 1986
- Offences under section 31 of the Crime and Disorder Act 1998
- Offences under Part V of the Criminal Justice and Public Order Act 1994
- Offences under Part II of the Criminal Law Act 1977
- Offences under the Protection from Eviction Act 1977
- Bomb hoaxes, contrary to section 51 of the Criminal Law Act 1977

== Offences against public morals and public policy ==
- Bigamy, contrary to section 57 of the Offences against the Person Act 1861
- Offences under section 2(1) of the Obscene Publications Act 1959
- Offences under section 2(2) of the Theatres Act 1968
- Certain offences under the Postal Services Act 2000
- Offences under section 1(1) of the Indecent Displays (Control) Act 1981
- Offences under section 1(1) of the Protection of Children Act 1978
- Offences under section 160 of the Criminal Justice Act 1988
- Offences under section 170 of the Customs and Excise Management Act 1979 consisting of importation in breach of the prohibition under section 42 of the Customs Consolidation Act 1876 (39 & 40 Vict. c. 36)
- Offences under the Bribery Act 2010

== Protection of children and vulnerable adults ==
- Child sexual exploitation
- Child trafficking
- Protection of Children Act 1978
- Offenses under the Safeguarding Vulnerable Groups Act 2006

== Protection of animals and the environment ==
See Cruelty to animals#United Kingdom and Environmental crime

- Offenses under the Animal Welfare Act 2006
- Mutilation
- Docking (animal)
- Animal fighting

== Participatory and inchoate offences ==
- Encouraging or assisting crime - Part 2 of the Serious Crime Act 2007
- Soliciting to murder, contrary to section 4 of the Offences against the Person Act 1861
- Aiding, abetting, counselling or procuring the commission of an offence
- Conspiracy, contrary to section 1(1) of the Criminal Law Act 1977
- Conspiracy to defraud
- Conspiracy to corrupt public morals
- Conspiracy to outrage public decency
- Attempt, contrary to section 1(1) of the Criminal Attempts Act 1981

Parts 1 to 3 of Schedule 3 to the Serious Crime Act 2007 list numerous statutory offences of assisting, encouraging, inciting, attempting or conspiring at the commission of various crimes.

== Other ==
- Mayhem
- Kidnapping
- False imprisonment
- Cheating the public revenue
- High treason
- Misprision of treason (disputed - alleged to be statutory)
- Compounding treason
- Contempt of the sovereign
- Misconduct in public office
- Refusal to execute public office
- Doing an act tending and intended to pervert the course of public justice - a.k.a. perverting the course of justice, defeating the ends of justice, obstructing the administration of justice
- Contempt of court a.k.a. criminal contempt
- Fabrication of false evidence
- Escape
- Permitting an escape
- Breach of prison/breaking prison
- Rescue/rescuing a prisoner in custody
- Public nuisance
- Outraging public decency
- Conspiracy to defraud
- Conspiracy to corrupt public morals
- Conspiracy to outrage public decency
- Common assault a.k.a. assault (disputed - held to now be statutory, said obiter not to be)
- battery (disputed - held to now be statutory, said obiter not to be)
- Assault with intent to rob (may now be statutory)
- Rape
- Assault with intent to rape (continued existence disputed)

== See also ==
- English criminal law
