= Inchoate offences in English law =

Overview of inchoate offences in the laws of England and Wales

In English criminal law, an inchoate offence is an offence relating to a criminal act which has not, or not yet, been committed. The main inchoate offences are attempting to commit; encouraging or assisting (formerly inciting) crime; and conspiring to commit.

Attempts, governed by the Criminal Attempts Act 1981, are defined as situations where an individual who intends to commit an offence does an act which is "more than merely preparatory" in the offence's commission. Traditionally this definition has caused problems, with no firm rule on what constitutes a "more than merely preparatory" act, but broad judicial statements give some guidance.

Incitement, on the other hand, is an offence under the common law, and covers situations where an individual encourages another person to engage in activities which will result in a criminal act taking place, and intends for this act to occur. As a criminal activity, incitement had a particularly broad remit, covering "a suggestion, proposal, request, exhortation, gesture, argument, persuasion, inducement, goading or the arousal of cupidity". Incitement as a common law offence was abolished by the Serious Crime Act 2007, but specific statutory offences continue and the concept is part of the foundation of the new offences relating to "encouraging or assisting" the commission of a crime.

Conspiracy is both a statutory and common law offence. In its statutory form, under the Criminal Law Act 1977, it consists of any agreement between two or more people to commit a criminal offence. Common law conspiracy, on the other hand, covers "conspiracy to defraud" and "conspiracy to corrupt public morals", although the latter has no substantive case law and is not seen as an offence that individuals are likely to be prosecuted for. All three inchoate offences require a mens rea of intent, and upon conviction, the defendant is sentenced as if they had succeeded in committing the attempted, incited or conspired crime in question.

== Definition ==
Inchoate means "just begun" or "undeveloped", and is used in English criminal law to refer to situations where, although a substantial offence has not been committed, the defendant has taken steps to commit it, or encouraged others to do so. These situations are generally divided into three categories; attempts, where the defendant has taken steps "towards carrying out a complete crime", incitement, where the defendant has encouraged others to commit a crime, and conspiracy, where the defendant has agreed with others to commit a crime. In each case, the defendant "has not himself performed the actus reus but is sufficiently close to doing so, or persuading others to do so, for the law to find it appropriate to punish him".

== Offences ==
Inchoate offences in English law: summary
Offence	Source	Indictable offences	Summary offences	Notes
Attempt	section 1 Criminal Attempts Act 1981	Yes	No	A handful of specific summary offences are capable of being attempted
Encouraging or assisting an offence	section 44-46 Serious Crime Act 2007	Yes	Yes	Previously the common law offence of "incitement"
Conspiracy (statutory)	section 1 Criminal Law Act 1977	Yes	Yes	Largely replaced the old common law offence of "conspiracy"
Conspiracy (common law)	Common law	Two specific offences	N/A	Can only be committed in respect of the offences of fraud, and outraging public decency

By virtue of the Accessories and Abettors Act 1861 (in respect of indictable offences) and the Magistrates' Courts Act 1980 (in respect of summary offences), a person who "aids, abets, counsels or procures" the commission of an offence is dealt with as though they committed the offence themselves. However, "aiding and abetting" is not an offence itself in the same way that inchoate offences are.

=== Attempt ===
Attempts are governed by the Criminal Attempts Act 1981, which states that "if, with intent to commit an offence to which [the act applies], a person does an act which is more than merely preparatory to the commission of the offence, he is guilty of attempting to commit the offence". A required element is intent, or mens rea. In R v Pearman, the Court of Appeal of England and Wales confirmed that the definition of intent in the 1981 Act is the same as the definition in the common law. The common law gives intention "its normal meaning: purpose or aim", with judges advised not to, in the majority of cases, attempt to complicate the definition. Conditional intent – where somebody has an intent to commit a crime only in certain circumstances – has also been deemed acceptable for an indictment for attempting a crime. In Attorney-General's Reference (Nos. 1 and 2 of 1979), the Court of Appeal explained that the intention to steal "anything that was worth stealing could form the basis of an attempt charge if the indictment was drafted carefully". This was a procedural solution to a previous apparent contradiction, but the suggested drafting may not demonstrate sufficient proximity between the defendant's actions and what he was planning to steal. A mens rea requirement is added to the attempt of crimes of strict liability (where there is no intent or merely objective recklessness), although the ruling in Attorney General's Reference (No. 3 of 1992) makes this less certain.

Section 1(1) also provides that the actus reus must be "more than merely preparatory". In practice, academic Jonathan Herring notes that "there is no hard and fast rule about when an act may be more than merely preparatory", although there are several cases which give broad guidance. In R v Geddes, a man entered the toilets in a school in Brighton with a large knife, some rope and a roll of masking tape; it was alleged that he was intending to kidnap a pupil. The Court of Appeal confirmed that this was not enough for a conviction. However, certain general rules have been laid down; if the defendant has committed the last act before completing his offence, it constitutes an attempt. This is not, however, necessary in all situations, as in R v Gullefer. The actus reus of the full offence is also taken into account; in R v Toothill, the defendant was charged with attempted burglary after trespassing into the victim's garden and knocking on their door. He was found guilty, because he had entered the property – the actus reus for burglary – and his actions were thus more than merely preparatory. The wording "does an act" prevents liability for omissions, a distinction that the Law Commission has looked to remove, at least in the case of attempted murder.

Certain things cannot be attempted. These include conspiracy, under section 1(4) of the 1981 Act, assisting a criminal, under section 4(1) of the Criminal Law Act 1967, aiding in the commission of an offence, or most summary offences, with the logic being that they are too minor for attempts to justify a criminal conviction. A small number of separate statutory offences have been created to cover attempts concerning individual summary offences, in which case, usual attempt law and procedure applies.

If someone is found guilty of an attempt, they are sentenced under section 4(1) of the 1981 Act. This provides that anyone who attempts to commit an offence will be punished with the same period in prison as if they had succeeded; since theft carries a maximum penalty of seven years in prison, for example, someone convicted of attempted theft would also find themselves sentenced to a maximum of seven years.

=== Encouraging or assisting ===
The offences of "encouraging or assisting a crime" under the Serious Crime Act 2007 are inchoate offences. In each case, the actus reus requirement is that the defendant carry out an act capable of "encouraging or assisting" the commission of another offence. An offence is committed under section 44, if this is done with intent to do the same; under section 45 if it is done "believing that the offence will be committed and that the act will encourage or assist its commission"; or under section 46 where there are multiple possible offences being encouraged or assisted, and at least one is foreseen. There is no need for the defendant to have successfully communicated his thoughts to anyone else. Since this is very wide, the courts will have to narrow it by some criterion, probably by reference to the remoteness of the encouragement to the crime. Failing to act when under a duty to do so would also qualify.

"Encouraging" is not defined in the statute and can be considered in the same way as the previous crime of incitement. It does not matter if the encouragement or assistance has no effect. "Assisting" is likely to be considered similar to "aiding" in accessorial liability. Assistance can be provided indirectly, for example through a third person.

Whereas incitement can only be committed when the defendant incites the principal offender, the crime of "encouraging or assisting" includes helping an accessory. Whilst a section 44 offence can be committed in relation to other inchoate offences (including itself), sections 45 and 46 cannot. Crimes which are, in fact rather than law, impossible to commit yet – but will be – also fall under this offence.

In terms of mens rea, any form of recklessness, including virtual certainty, is insufficient for an offence under Section 44, in part due to the existence of Section 45 and 46 which aid its interpretation. Offences under Sections 45 and 46 are only committed if the defendant believes that both the crime will be committed, and that the act will encourage or assist the offender: that they might do so is not enough. However, it is also possible to commit these offences if the defendant commits an act capable of encouraging or assisting the commission of a crime, intending or believing that the principal offender would carry out the "act", where that may not in itself constitute a crime. However, it is necessary that the defendant intend or be reckless to any required circumstances or consequences – for example, that death was a result. Additionally, the prosecution must show that the defendant believed that (or was reckless to) whether the act would be done with the required mens rea, or that the defendant himself has the required mens rea for the offence. These amount to very complex provisions.

There is no defence of later withdrawing from the act; however, there is one of "acting reasonably" under Section 50. This takes two forms: either that the acts themselves were reasonable; or that the defendant reasonably believed in circumstances which did not exist and acted reasonably under those circumstances. The existence of this defence has been attacked by Andrew Simester and Bob Sullivan on the grounds it may be acting as a "sop" to counteract excess brevity in other sections of the act. Victims are extended the "Tyrell" defence – that one cannot aid, abet, counsel or procure an offence against oneself – although exactly when a victim is protected can be unclear.

=== Incitement ===
The common law offence of inciting the commission of another offence was abolished on 1 October 2008, except in relation to offences committed wholly or partly before that date. However, the language of incitement is retained in other statutory offences, such as inciting a child under 13 to engage in sexual activity contrary to section 8 of the Sexual Offences Act 2003. The same rules are applied in these cases as the existing body of law on incitement.

The Court of Appeal considers incitement to consist of a situation in which a defendant "incites another to do or cause to be done an act or acts which, if done, will involve the commission of the offence or offences by the other; and he intends or believes that the other, if he acts as incited, shall or will do so with the fault required for the offence or offences". Unlike attempts, incitement is a common law offence. Incitement has a particularly broad actus reus; it has been interpreted to include "a suggestion, proposal, request, exhortation, gesture, argument, persuasion, inducement, goading or the arousal of cupidity". While it must include an act of incitement, this can be both express and implied. For an offence to be committed, the incited act must be criminal in nature, and an offence not only for the person doing the incitement but the person incited. Some exceptions are made; under section 5(7) of the Criminal Law Act 1977, incitement to conspire is not an offence, and incitement to an aid or attempt are similarly not specifically given as criminal acts. In terms of mens rea, the defendant must have intended the incited offence to be committed, and also be aware of the likely consequences. It has been suggested that intent should not be necessary; if the defendant knew that his advice would be followed, and this would result in a crime, he should be found guilty.

=== Conspiracy ===
Statutory conspiracy consists of an agreement between two or more people to commit a criminal offence, under section 5(1) and (2) of the 1977 Act. For statutory conspiracies, there must be three elements: an agreement, to pursue a course of conduct which involves the commission of a crime, where the parties to the agreement intended to commit the crime. Even if the parties later decide not to go through with the plan, since the actus reus is to reach an agreement, they can still be charged. There are certain categories of agreement which cannot amount to a criminal conspiracy, however; an agreement between a husband and wife is not a conspiracy, under section 2(2)(a) of the 1977 Act, and neither is an agreement with a person under the age of criminal responsibility, or with the intended victim of the crime.

There is no need, under Churchill v Walton, to show that the conspirators knew that their proposed course of conduct amounted to a crime, but they must have intended the consequences; if two people conspire to put poison in the victim's tea, this is not a conspiracy to murder unless the poison was intended to kill the victim. The defendants will similarly not be found guilty if they are unaware that a crime will result; if two people agree to grow plants, unaware that the plants are illegal, they have not engaged in a conspiracy. On the other hand, if the two people believe the plants to be illegal even though they are not, they could be found guilty.

Common law conspiracies, on the other hand, fall into two categories; "conspiracy to defraud" and "conspiracy to corrupt public morals". A third category which existed at the time of the 1977 Act, "conspiracy to outrage public decency", has now become a statutory offence. Indeed, corrupting public morals may have become a statutory offence; the situation is unclear. The standard definition of a conspiracy to defraud was provided by Lord Dilhorne in Scott v Metropolitan Police Commissioner, when he said that

it is clearly the law that an agreement by two or more by dishonesty to deprive a person of something which is his or to which he is or would be entitled and an agreement by two or more by dishonesty to injure some proprietary right of his, suffices to constitute the offence of conspiracy to defraud.

Conspiracy to defraud therefore contains two key elements; that the conspiracy involved dishonesty, and that if the conspiracy was undertaken, the victim's property rights would be harmed. This does not require the defendants' actions to directly result in the fraud; in R v Hollinshead, the House of Lords held that producing devices designed to alter electricity meter readings constituted conspiracy to defraud, even though the actual fraud would be carried out by members of the public rather than the conspirators. In two situations, it will not even be necessary for the actions to directly lead to any kind of financial loss for the victim; these are when the conspirators plan to deceive a person holding public office into acting counter to their duties, and when the conspirators know that their actions put the victim's property at risk, even if the risk never materialises. Conspiracy to "corrupt public morals" has no definitive case law; it is unknown whether or not it is a substantive offence, and Herring sees it as unlikely that conspirators will be prosecuted for this offence.

== Defence of impossibility ==
Some exceptions are also made for "impossible attempts", which are divided into legal impossibility, impossibility through ineptitude and physical impossibility. Cases of legal impossibility occur when the defendant attempts to do something which he believes to be illegal, which is in fact not; this does not constitute a crime. This defence does, however, remain for common law conspiracies. Impossibility through ineptitude is where the defendant attempts to commit a crime with inadequate means, in which case he can be found guilty. However, prosecutors' discretion is likely to be a factor, since some plans – for example murder through a voodoo doll – may be simply too removed from the attempted crime. Physical impossibility covers situations where not only is the action inadequate, but impossible; an example is the attempted murder of (or conspiracy to murder) someone who is, in fact, already dead. Such actions are governed by section 1(2) and 1(3) of the 1981 Act, which provides that they do constitute a crime if the actions, were the facts of the case to be as the defendant believed them to be, would have led to a valid attempt; as Herring states, "if the defendant believes he is dealing in illegal drugs he can be convicted of an attempted drug-dealing offence, even if in fact what he is selling is chalk". A plan which successfully comes to fruition without the offence the defendant intended coming to pass may also relieve the defendant of liability, although this ruling from Haughton v Smith has proved hard to distinguish from the abolition of other defences of impossibility.

== Theory ==
As a general principle of the law, criminal liability is normally only imposed upon "a blameworthy actor who causes a prohibited harm", and while those who attempt crimes may be blameworthy, it can be argued that there is no harm caused; attempted burglary, for example, does not lead to anything being stolen. Many theorists who make the distinction between successful and failed attempts do still consider the defendant partially liable, for example advocating a lesser punishment. However, there have been two distinct counterarguments advanced against making such a distinction. The first is that when a crime is attempted, there is a harm, namely a threat to security. Individuals have the right to security, both of themselves and their property, and an attempt to commit a crime infringes on this right. The second is that, regardless of the harm principle, criminal liability for attempts can be justified in utilitarian terms. A person who tries to commit a crime has shown themselves to be dangerous, and must be restrained and rehabilitated to provide a deterrence for them and for others. Although a differing approach is taken in some United States jurisdictions, intervention can happen very early in a conspiracy and the defendants can still be held liable. The earlier the liability, the more controversial.

For conspiracy, the standard justification is the "group-danger" rationale, which states that since the objective of the criminal law is to protect harm to the community, and the community is at more risk from a group of people with harmful intentions than an individual with those same intentions, conspiracies themselves must be made a crime. The criminalisation of incitement is justified with the argument that incitement constitutes an attempt at conspiracy; the inciter's objective is to persuade others to engage in criminal acts, with his knowledge and cooperation, and as such is "more dangerous than a direct attempt, because it may give rise to that cooperation among criminals which is a special hazard".

== Bibliography ==
- Clarkson, C.M.V.; Keating, H.M.; Cunningham, S.R. (2007). Clarkson and Keating Criminal Law: Text and Materials (6th ed.). Sweet & Maxwell. ISBN 978-0-421-94780-1.
- Herring, Jonathan (2008). Criminal Law: Text, Cases and Materials (3rd ed.). Oxford University Press. ISBN 978-0-19-923432-5.
- Simester, A. P.; Sullivan, G. R.; Spencer, J. R.; Virgo, G. (2010). Simester and Sullivan's Criminal Law: Theory and Doctrine (4 ed.). Oxford: Hart Publishing. ISBN 978-1-84113-922-7.
