= Incitement =

Encouragement of another person to commit a crime

In criminal law, incitement is the encouragement of another person to commit a crime. Depending on the jurisdiction, some or all types of incitement may be illegal. Where illegal, it is known as an inchoate offense, where harm is intended but may or may not have actually occurred.

== International law ==
The Article 20 of the International Covenant on Civil and Political Rights requires that any advocacy of national, racial or religious hatred that constitutes incitement to discrimination, hostility or violence shall be prohibited by law. That few journalists have been prosecuted for incitement to genocide and war crimes despite their recruitment by governments as propagandists is explained by the relatively privileged social status of journalists and privileged institutional position of news organizations in liberal societies, which assign a high value to a free press.

== Examples ==
- Incitement to ethnic or racial hatred
- Incitement to genocide
- Incitement to political violence
- Incitement to terrorism
- Hate speech

== England and Wales ==
Incitement was an offence under the common law of England and Wales. It was an inchoate offence. It consisted of persuading, encouraging, instigating, pressuring, or threatening so as to cause another to commit a crime.

It was abolished in England and Wales on 1 October 2008 when Part 2 of the Serious Crime Act 2007 came into force, replacing it with three new statutory offences of encouraging or assisting crime. The common law is now only relevant to offences committed before that date.

=== Relationship to other offences ===
The rationale of incitement matches the general justification underpinning the other inchoate offences of conspiracy and attempt by allowing the police to intervene before a criminal act is completed and the harm or injury is actually caused. There is considerable overlap, particularly where two or more individuals are involved in criminal activity. The plan to commit crime may exist only in the mind of one person until others are incited to join in, at which point the social danger becomes more real. The offence overlaps the offences of counselling or procuring as an accessory. Indeed, in the early case of R v Higgins incitement was defined as being committed when one person counsels, procures or commands another to commit a crime, whether or not that person commits the crime. The words, "counsel" and "procure" were later adopted in section 8 of the Accessories and Abettors Act 1861 as two of the four forms of accessory. In AG's Reference (No. 1 of 1975), Widgery CJ said:

To procure means to produce by endeavour. You procure a thing by setting out to see that it happens and taking the appropriate steps to produce that happening. We think that there are plenty of instances in which a person may be said to procure the commission of a crime by another even though there is no sort of conspiracy between the two, even though there is no attempt at agreement or discussion as to the form which the offence should take. But secondary liability is derivative and dependent on the commission of the substantive offence by the principal offender. This is too late to avert the harm. Thus, the offence of incitement has been preserved to allow the police to intervene at an earlier time and so avert the threatened harm.

=== The mens rea ===
The inciter must intend the others to engage in the behaviour constituting the offence, including any consequences which may result, and must know or believe (or possibly suspect) that those others will have the relevant mens rea. In R v Curr, the defendant allegedly incited women to commit offences under the Family Allowances Act 1945 but, because the prosecution did not prove that the women had the mens rea to constitute the offence, the conviction was quashed. Fenton Atkinson explained:

In our view, the argument for the prosecution here gives no effect to the word "knowing" in [the relevant statutory provision], and in our view could only be guilty. if the woman solicited that, that is, the woman agent sent to collect the allowance, knew that the action she was asked to carry out amounted to an offence.

In R v Whitehouse, a father was charged with inciting his fifteen-year-old daughter to have sexual intercourse with him. At this age, she would have been excused from liability for committing the offence of incest with her father. The conviction was quashed on appeal and Scarman LJ explained that:

... we have therefore come to the conclusion, with regret, that the indictment does not disclose an offence known to the law because it cannot be a crime on the part of this girl aged 15 to have sexual intercourse with her father, though it is of course a crime and a very serious crime, on the part of the father. There is here incitement to a course of conduct, but that course of conduct cannot be treated as a crime by the girl.

He continued:

It is regrettable indeed that a man who importunes his daughter under the age of 16 to have sexual intercourse with him but does not go beyond incitement cannot be guilty of a crime.

The Court of Appeal in R v Claydon (2005) EWCA Crim 2817 has repeated this criticism. Claydon had sexually abused the thirteen-year-old son of his partner in the 1980s, and was tried twenty years later on an indictment containing counts of sexual offences, including two counts of incitement to commit buggery. At that time, there was an irrebuttable presumption that a boy under the age of fourteen years was incapable of sexual intercourse (applying R v Waite (1892) 2 QBD 600–601 and R v Williams [1893] 1 QB 320–321). It was argued by the Crown that, although the boy could not in law have committed the act incited, it was nevertheless quite possible for the defendant to incite him. Having considered R v Whitehouse and R v Pickford, the Court of Appeal felt obliged to reject that argument. As Laws J said in Pickford, "it is a necessary element of the element of incitement that the person incited must be capable [by which he meant capable as a matter of law] of committing the primary crime." The Court agreed because the focus of the offence of inciting is solely on the acts and intention of the inciter while the intention of the person incited are not relevant when considering whether the offence of incitement has been committed. It further endorsed the views of Smith and Hogan (10th Edition at p 295) who criticised the decision in Curr on the basis that "...the real question should not have been not whether the women actually had the knowledge, but whether D believed they had." Furthermore, Smith (1994) said that "the court has confused the mens rea of incitement with the mens rea of the offence incited".

=== The actus reus ===
The inciter is one who reaches out and seeks to influence the mind of another to commit a crime, although where, for example, a letter conveying the incitement is intercepted, there is only an attempt to incite (see R v Banks (1873) 12 Cox CC 393). So merely making suggestions is not enough. There must be actual communication so that the other person has the opportunity to agree, but the actus reus is complete whether or not the incitement actually persuades another to commit an offence. In R v Goldman [2001] Crim LR 822 the defendant wrote to a Dutch firm (ESV) which had advertised pornography for sale, requesting pornographic material. He was convicted of an attempt to incite another (ESV) to distribute indecent photographs because the offer to buy amounted to an inducement to ESV to commit a crime.

In R v Fitzmaurice, it was held that the necessary element of persuasion was satisfied by a "suggestion, proposal or request [that] was accompanied by an implied promise of reward". In Race Relations Board v Applin, Lord Denning stated that a person may incite another to do an act by threatening or by pressure, as well as by persuasion. The incitement can take any form (words or deeds). It may be addressed to a particular person or group or to the public at large. In R v Marlow [1997] Crim LR 897 the defendant wrote and published a book on the cultivation of cannabis, which he advertised, selling about 500 copies. It was alleged that the book was not a bona fide textbook, but was an incitement to those who bought it to cultivate cannabis. The defence claimed the book as a genuine contribution to the debate on the legalisation of cannabis and said that it only contained general advice which was freely available elsewhere. The judge directed the jury that they had to be sure that the book could "encourage or persuade or is capable of encouraging or persuading other people to produce the drug". The Court of Appeal held that there was no misdirection and the conviction was not unsafe.

Thus, the incitement may be implied as well as express and may be directed to persons generally. The test is whether there is a lawful use for the device. For example, a recording or transcribing device may be used lawfully without breaching copyright, but a device to detect radar signals so as to avoid speed camera/red light infringement systems would have no other purpose than assisting drivers to evade detection. But note that the act incited must be a crime by the person incited so any alleged breach of copyright would have to be criminal, and the defendant would have to know all the material facts that would make the incited person's behaviour criminal, but not that the behaviour was a crime (see the public policy ignorantia juris non-excusat which prevents ignorance of the law from being an excuse). In R v Whitehouse an uncle did not incite his 15-year-old niece to incest because, if the incitement had succeeded and she had submitted to intercourse, she would not have committed an offence. This applied R v Tyrell which stated that where a statutory offence is designed to protect a particular class of individuals against themselves, they cannot, as the victims, commit such offences against themselves. In Tyrell, the girl was not guilty of inciting the man to have under-age sex with her, since the girl could not herself be guilty of the full offence.

=== Impossibility ===
If X incites Y to kill Z but, unknown to both of them at the time, Z had already died, it would be impossible to kill Z and so no crime of incitement would have been committed. Apart from simple situations such as this, the current law is difficult. R v Fitzmaurice allows the impossibility defence, but its scope is quite limited. X planned to collect a reward from a security firm by informing the police of the existence of a conspiracy to rob a security van. He recruited the defendant who thought he was engaging men for this robbery. Subsequently, the conspirators were arrested by the police. The Court of Appeal held that the test was to decide what sort of conduct was incited, attempted or the subject of a conspiracy. If the evidence shows incitement in general terms, e.g. to rob a security van, this is always possible, whereas if the subsequent agreement relates to a specific but fictitious crime, there might be an acquittal. In DPP v Armstrong [2000] Crim LR 379, 1999 EWHC 270 (QB) it was held that impossibility of the commission of the offence incited was irrelevant to guilt.

Soliciting to murder

The offence of soliciting to murder is created by section 4 of the Offences against the Person Act 1861.

Inciting to commit perjury

This offence is created by section 7(2) of the Perjury Act 1911.

Inciting another to commit an offence against the Official Secrets Acts 1911 and 1920

This offence is created by section 7 of the Official Secrets Act 1920.

Inciting a child under 14 to gross indecency

The Indecency with Children Act 1960 provided that it was an offence, amongst other things, to incite a child under the age of fourteen to an act of gross indecency with the inciter or another.

Inciting a girl under 16 to commit incest

This offence was created by section 54 of the Criminal Law Act 1977.

=== Statutory incitement ===
There are, in England and Wales, a number of statutory offences of incitement, e.g. incitement to racial hatred under the Public Order Act 1986.

== Israel ==
Under Israeli law, the classification of an offense as incitement is applied to incidents in which a person publishes something with the aim to incite violence or terrorism, and it is conditional on the concrete possibility that the specific publication might induce the commission of an act of violence or terrorism. The sanction which is envisaged is 5 years imprisonment.

In areas of the West Bank administered by the Israeli Defense Forces, the crime of incitement, is adjudicated by military legislation and carries a prison sentence of up to 10 years, has been described as follows:

The “incitement” offense is defined by military law in very broad terms, and includes any incident in which a person attempts to influence public opinion in a manner that could harm public safety or public order. ... The incitement offense is used by the military courts to adjudicate Palestinians in offenses that concern, inter alia, hanging posters or writing slogans against the occupation.

== New Zealand ==
In New Zealand, every one who incites any person to commit an offence is a party to and guilty of the offence and liable for the same penalty as a person who commits the offence.

When a person incites another to commit an offence that is not in fact committed the person is liable for the same penalty as a person who attempts to commit an offence that is not in fact committed. The penalty for inciting the commission of an offence that is not in fact committed is 10 years imprisonment if the maximum penalty for the offence is imprisonment for life and in other cases up to half the maximum penalty of the primary offence.

== Turkey ==
The Turkish Penal Code distinguishes between the crimes of abetting (Article 38) and assisting (Article 39). Under paragraph (a) of the second clause of the article 39, incitement is included in the provision regarding assisting. Specifically, the law outlines how aiding a crime involves both encouraging someone to commit a crime and helping them afterward. This includes actions like providing tools for the crime, promising to hide the criminal, or reinforcing someone’s already existing decision to commit the crime, known as incitement.

Individuals who abet someone to commit a crime, even though that person initially had no intention of doing so, are called accessories.They are prosecuted for the crime they encouraged.

== United States ==
The First Amendment to the United States Constitution guarantees free speech, and the degree to which incitement is protected speech is determined by the imminent lawless action test introduced by the 1969 Supreme Court decision in the case Brandenburg v. Ohio. The court ruled that incitement of events in the indefinite future was protected, but encouragement of "imminent" illegal acts was not protected. This "view reflects longstanding law and is shared by the Federalist Society, the American Civil Liberties Union, the Foundation for Individual Rights and Expression." In 2021, U.S. President Donald Trump was impeached for "incitement of insurrection" for allegedly provoking the January 6 Capitol attack; he was later acquitted by a minority of the U.S. Senate.

Incitement to riot is illegal under U.S. federal law.

== See also ==
- Countering violent extremism
- Diffusion of responsibility
- Deradicalization
- Fighting words
- Plausible deniability
- Solicitation
- Stochastic terrorism
- Terrorism and social media
- True threat
