= Attorney General v Oldridge =

Irish Supreme Court case

- Coat of arms of Ireland
- Court: Supreme Court of Ireland
- Full case name: The Attorney General, Applicant v Albert John Oldridge, Respondent [2000] IESC 29
- Decided: 19 December 2000
- Citations: Attorney General v Oldridge [2000] IESC 29, [2000] IESC 29

Case history
- Appealed from: Attorney General v Oldridge (High Court) 10 November 1999

Court membership
- Judges sitting: Keane C.J., Denham J., McGuinness J., Geoghegan J., Fennelly J.

Case opinions
- There are offences in the jurisdiction corresponding with the offences in respect of which the respondent's extradition is sought, namely: Conspiracy to defraud, contrary to common law.
- Decision by: Keane C.J.
- Concurrence: Denham J, McGuinness J, Geoghegan J, Fennelly J

Keywords
- Extradition; Conspiracy to defraud; Common Law; Robbery; Corresponding Offence

Attorney General v Oldridge [2000] IESC 29; [2000] 4 IR 593 was an Irish Supreme Court case which examined "whether corresponding offenses to wire fraud existed in Irish law." The court found that although "wire fraud" did not exist in Irish law, the criminal activity was covered by existing fraud laws. The result of this decision was to broaden the use of fraud and specifically to rule that the charge of "conspiracy to defraud" is constitutional.

== Background ==
=== Case details ===
The case involved the efforts of an individual to resist extradition to the United States to face charges for wire fraud. The defendant argued that because there was no "wire fraud" crime in Ireland he could not be extradited. His argument hinged on the point at which he became involved in the fraudulent enterprise. The fraud involved two phases. The first phase involved obtaining money from banks under false pretenses. The second phase consisted of a "lulling phase" where the fraudsters assured the bank that the enterprise was legitimate. The first phase of the scheme corresponded to existing Irish laws, but the second did not, according to a lower court. The defendant in this case was involved in the second phase, but not the first phase. As such the court had to rule if there was, in fact, a corresponding Irish law and if so, whether or not extradition was permitted.

In the U.S., Oldridge was indicted for carrying out the scheme to obtain loans from the three banks by means of false and fraudulent pretences, representation and promises. He was charged with wire fraud and abetting wire fraud on various dates in order to execute the scheme in contrary to the United States Code.

=== The District Court & High Court ===
On 26 November 1997, the District Court (Judge Gerard J. Haughton) heard the application for the extradition of Oldridge to the U.S. in pursuant to Part II of the Extradition Act 1965 to 1995. On 17 December 1997, the District Judge held that he could not find a statutory equivalent in Ireland to the statutory offences in the United States with which the respondent was charged. The case then went to the High Court to determine if there was an Irish law that corresponded to the U.S. charge of wire fraud.

In the High Court, prosecution argued that the "lulling phase" was essential to the fraudulent scheme, and because of this one could establish conspiracy to defraud as the corresponding offence. However, the High Court judge rejected this argument and ruling against the applicant, turned to the Washington Treaty. Under Article 2 (1) of the Treaty:

"An offence shall be an extraditable offence only if it is punishable under the law of both Contracting Parties by imprisonment for a period of more than one year, or by a more severe penalty. When the request for extradition relates to a person who is wanted for the enforcement of a sentence of imprisonment, extradition shall be granted only if the duration of the sentence still to be served amounts to at least four months."

The Court Judge held that conspiracy to defraud had no prescribed minimum sentencing and thus the requirement had not been met. On 10 November 1999, in the High Court, Kearns J. answered the first question in the negative and submitted that there was no corresponding offence. Leave to appeal to the Supreme Court was granted by the High Court on 20 December 1999 which resulted in the applicant appealing the case to the Supreme Court on 13 January 2000.

== Holding of the Supreme Court ==
=== Findings of the Supreme Court ===
The court agreed that participation in the "lulling phase" did not correspond to the Irish crime "obtaining money by false pretense." However, citing Scott v Metropolitan Police Commissioner, the court ruled that the Irish law "conspiracy to defraud" was applicable. The court then affirmed the constitutionality of this charge in the context of extradition (and the Washington Treaty specifically), agreeing with the High Court case of Myles v. Sreenan [1999] 4 I.R. 294.

=== Conclusion ===
On 19 December 2000, in a unanimous decision, the Supreme Court allowed the appeal and substituted the High Court order holding that there was a corresponding offence and that the corresponding offence in Irish law was conspiracy to defraud, contrary to common law.

== Subsequent developments ==
The case of AG v Oldridge was considered in AG v Burns [2003] in the High Court. The case was referred to in Egan v O'Toole [2005] in the Supreme Court and DPP v Bowe [2017] in the Court of Appeal. The case was cited in AG v Oles [2003] in the High Court and Minister for Justice v Fallon Aka O Falluin [2005] in the High Court.

== See also ==
- List of Irish Supreme Court cases
- Republic of Ireland
- Law of the Republic of Ireland
