= Medicine and Justice: Medico-Legal Practice in England and Wales, 1700–1914 =

Book by Katherine Watson

Medicine and Justice
- Cover
- Author: Katherine D. Watson
- Original title: Medicine and Justice: Medico-Legal Practice in England and Wales, 1700–1914
- Language: English
- Subject: Medical history, legal history, British history (1700–1914)
- Genre: Non-fiction
- Publisher: Routledge
- Publication date: December 6, 2019
- Publication place: United Kingdom
- Pages: 334
- ISBN: 978-1000765373
- OCLC: 1245923850

Medicine and Justice : Medico-Legal Practice in England and Wales, 1700-1914 is a 2019 book by British historian Katherine D. Watson published by Routledge. The book delves into the intertwined history of law, crime, and medicine in 18th and 19th-century England and Wales, emphasising the role of medical professionals in criminal investigations. Through an extensive analysis, it highlights the evolution of medico-legal practices, particularly their growing significance in trials for violent crimes and the establishment of the "beyond a reasonable doubt" standard.

== Overview ==
The book explores the connection between the history of law, crime, and medicine in England and Wales during the 18th and 19th centuries. It focuses on the role of medical professionals who provided evidence in criminal cases, shedding light on the development of investigative methods and personnel during the emergence of modern policing and adversarial trials. The book answers two key questions: how did medical practitioners contribute to the investigation of serious crimes during this period, and what impact did this have on the criminal justice process?

By examining 2,600 cases of infanticide, murder, and rape in central England, Wales, and London, the book offers a long-term perspective on medico-legal practices. It argues that these practices evolved alongside the needs of investigative procedures led by coroners, magistrates, and the police, as well as the changing role of lawyers in criminal trials. By bringing together doctors, coroners, lawyers, and police officers, the book provides an interpretation of the processes that shaped the modern criminal justice system.

The rise of medical practitioners as courtroom witnesses was closely linked to the emergence of defence attorneys in the 1730s, who emphasised scrutinising evidence. This made medical opinions more valuable, particularly in cases involving violent assaults. The introduction of the "beyond a reasonable doubt" standard for guilt further increased the demand for medical testimony to clarify the origin of fatal injuries.

The book also delves into the challenges medical witnesses faced in providing definitive evidence of live birth in infanticide trials and highlights the critical role of toxicology in poisoning cases, where medical practitioners could distinguish themselves through specialised knowledge.

== Reception ==
In his review, Ian Burney of the University of Manchester sees the book as a valuable contribution to understanding medico-legal practice during the 18th and 19th centuries. He highlights that Watson's work emphasises the practical aspects of medico-legal practice, focusing on the roles of medical professionals in criminal cases. The book draws distinctions between recognised experts and average practitioners. Watson's research is commended for its data collection, involving 2,615 cases of homicide across 22 counties in England and Wales. The study reveals the professionalisation of medico-legal work over time, driven by practical requirements and knowledge exchanges within the criminal justice system. Burney touches on different chapters in the book, including medico-legal education and medical participation in cases of infant murder. He also addresses a point of contention regarding the role of medical practitioners at crime scenes, where the author disagrees with Watson's interpretation of historical evidence.

Author and academic Joel Peter Eigen of the Franklin and Marshall College highlights in a review essay two fundamental questions posed by Watson's work: First, what contributions did medical practitioners make to the investigation of serious violent crimes during the 18th and 19th centuries? And second, how did their testimony impact criminal adjudication? The first question, argues Eigen, is answered affirmatively, showing that medical practitioners played a significant role in examining crime scenes, assessing injuries, and determining the cause of death. The review acknowledges that determining the precise influence of medical witnesses in court is complex. Verdicts were often based on circumstantial evidence and factors outside the realm of medicine. The broader community's notions of guilt and innocence could also influence jurors' decisions. While medical practitioners were well received by coroners and attorneys, their persuasive influence on juries remains difficult to quantify. Eigen then highlights the enduring influence of judges in courtrooms, as they had the final say in summarising evidence, instructing the jury, and shaping the narrative of the case.
