= S v Pakane =

South African legal case

In S v Pakane & Others (2007), an important case in South African criminal procedure, the three appellants, all police officers, appeared on charges relating to the death of one F, who had been shot twice, once at sufficiently close range as to leave a contact wound.

The second appellant, a sergeant, was convicted of murder and of defeating the ends of justice and sentenced.

The first and third appellants, both constables, were convicted of being accessories after the fact to murder, and were each sentenced.

All three appealed.

In South African law there is generally no distinction between accessorial liability and defeating the course of justice.

Thus the court noted that although the first and third appellants had assisted the second appellant in his attempt to evade justice as they had not reported the incident, to convict them of this offense when they had already been convicted of being accessories to the murder, would amount to a duplication of convictions.
