= Encouraging or assisting a crime in English law =

Inchoate criminal offence in England and Wales

Encouraging or assisting a crime is itself a crime in English criminal law, by virtue of the Serious Crime Act 2007. It is one of the inchoate offences of English law.

== Definition ==
Inchoate means "just begun" or "undeveloped", and is used in English criminal law to refer to situations where, although a substantial offence has not been committed, the defendant has taken steps to commit it, or encouraged others to do so. As in all inchoate offences, the defendant "has not himself performed the actus reus but is sufficiently close to doing so, or persuading others to do so, for the law to find it appropriate to punish him".

=== Actus reus ===
The offences of encouraging or assisting crime under the Serious Crime Act 2007 are inchoate offences. In each case, the actus reus requirement is that the defendant carry out an act capable of "encouraging or assisting" the commission of another offence. An offence is committed under section 44, if this is done with intent to do the same; under section 45 if it is done "believing that the offence will be committed and that the act will encourage or assist its commission"; or under section 46 where there are multiple possible offences being encouraged or assisted, and at least one is foreseen. In contrast to statutory crimes still reliant on incitement, there is no need for the defendant to have communicated his thoughts to anyone else. For example, the act is when a letter is posted; it is not reliant on it being received by the person being incited. Since this is very wide, the courts will have to narrow it by some criterion, probably by reference to the remoteness of the encouragement to the crime. Failing to act when under a duty to do so would also qualify.

"Encouraging" is not defined in the statute and can be considered in the same way as the previous crime of incitement. It does not matter if the encouragement or assistance has no effect. In Invicta Plastics Ltd v Clare, a company sold a device to detect radar traps used by the police; using such a device is illegal. The case also confirmed that there is no need for the incitement to be aimed at a specific person – addressing it to the world at large still constitutes incitement. It was advertised illustrating its use in an illegal fashion. However, in R v James the selling of "black boxes" solely capable of illegally tapping mains electricity sources was not found to incite a crime. In R v Marlow providing information on the growing of cannabis was found to constitute an offence. "Assisting" is likely to be considered similar to "aiding" in accessorial liability. Assistance can be provided indirectly, for example through a third person.

Whereas incitement can only be committed when the defendant incites the principal offender, the crime of "encouraging or assisting" includes helping an accessory. Whilst a section 44 offence can be committed in relation to other inchoate offences (including itself), sections 45 and 46 cannot. Crimes which are, in fact rather than law, impossible to commit yet – but will be – also fall under this offence.

=== Mens rea ===
In terms of mens rea, any form of recklessness, including virtual certainty, is insufficient for an offence under Section 44, in part due to the existence of Section 45 and 46 which aid its interpretation. Offences under Sections 45 and 46 are only committed if the defendant believes that both the crime will be committed, and that the act will encourage or assist the offender: that they might do so is not enough. However, it is also possible to commit these offences if the defendant commits an act capable of encouraging or assisting the commission of a crime, intending or believing that the principal offender would carry out the "act", where that may not in itself constitute a crime. However, it is necessary that the defendant intend or be reckless to any required circumstances or consequences – for example, that death was a result. Additionally, the prosecution must show that the defendant believed that (or was reckless as to) whether the act would be done with the required mens rea, or that the defendant himself has the required mens rea for the offence. These amount to very complex provisions.

== Specific defences ==
There is no defence of later withdrawing from the act; however, there is one of "acting reasonably" under Section 50. This takes two forms: either that the acts themselves were reasonable; or that the defendant reasonably believed in circumstances which did not exist and acted reasonably under those circumstances. The existence of this defence has been attacked by professors of criminal law Andrew Simester and Bob Sullivan on the grounds it may be acting as a "sop" to counteract excess brevity in other sections of the act. Victims are extended the "Tyrell" defence – that one cannot aid, abet, counsel or procure an offence against oneself – although exactly when a victim is protected can be unclear.
