= Shi (personator) =

Practice in Chinese ancestor veneration

The shi (Chinese: 尸; pinyin: shī; Wade–Giles: sh'ih; lit. 'corpse') was a ceremonial "personator" who represented a dead relative during ancient Chinese ancestral sacrifices. In a shi ceremony, the ancestral spirit supposedly would enter the descendant "corpse" personator, who would eat and drink sacrificial offerings and convey messages from the spirit. James Legge, an early translator of the Chinese classics, described shi personation ceremonies as "grand family reunions where the dead and the living met, eating and drinking together, where the living worshipped the dead, and the dead blessed the living." In modern terms, this ancient Chinese shi practice would be described as necromancy, mediumship, or spirit possession.

== Word ==
Oracle bone script for shi 尸

Bronze script for shi 尸

Seal script for shi 尸

The word shi 尸 "corpse; personator; inactive; lay out; manage; spirit tablet" can be discussed in terms of Chinese character evolution, historical phonology, semantics, and English translations.

=== Characters ===
The modern character 尸 for shi "corpse; personator" is a graphic simplification of ancient pictographs showing a person with a bent back and dangling legs. The first records of shi are on oracle bones dating from the late Shang dynasty (c. 1600 – c. 1046 BCE). The oracle bone script for shi 尸 "corpse" was used interchangeably for yi 夷 "barbarian; non-Chinese people (esp. eastern, see Dongyi); at ease; level". The bronze script for shi 尸, found in Chinese bronze inscriptions dating from the Shang and Zhou dynasty (c. 1045 BCE – c. 256 BCE), had a more curved back and legs. The graphically reduced seal script for shi, standardized during the Qin dynasty (221–207 BCE), resembles the regular script 尸.

Today, shi 尸 is more commonly used as the "corpse/body radical" in Chinese characters (number 44 in the List of Kangxi radicals) than to write the original word "corpse". Many characters written with this radical involve the body (e.g., niao 尿 "urine" with 水 "water"), but not all (e.g., wu 屋 "house; room" with 至 "go to").

Shi 尸 "corpse; cadaver" has a variant Chinese character 屍 that combines the "corpse radical" 尸 with si 死 "dead" (e.g., jiang shi 僵屍 "stiff corpse") Michael Carr explains, "This semantically redundant shi 屍 'dead-corpse' graphically distinguishes the original 'corpse' meaning of shi 尸 from its various other meanings such as 'personator'."

=== Meanings ===
Chinese classics used the word shi 尸 in six meanings:

- (1) "corpse; body of a dead person"
- (2) "personator of a dead ancestor"
- (3) "motionless; inactive"
- (4) "lay out; arrange; expose"
- (5) "manage; direct; spirit tablet"
- (6) "proper names (of a place, family, and bird)"

Carr outlines the semantic connections among these shi meanings. The basic meaning (1) "corpse" was semantically extended into both (2) "act on behalf of a corpse" or "personator of a dead ancestor" and (3) "act like a corpse" or "motionless; inactive; doing nothing". Meaning (4) "lay out, arrange; display" generalizes "lay out a corpse." Meaning (5) "manage; direct; ancestral tablet" links the representative shi (2) "personator" with the metaphorical replacement "ancestral tablet". Meaning (6) uses shi to transcribe proper names.

Meaning (1) is the core sense of "corpse; dead body; cadaver; carcass". Early ritual texts, notably the Liji "Classic of Rites", Zhouli "Rites of Zhou", and Yili "Etiquette and Rites", frequently use shi "corpse" in mortuary and funeral contexts. Here is an example Liji passage:

As soon as death took place, the corpse was transferred to the couch, and covered with a large sheet. The clothes in which the deceased had died were removed. A servant plugged the mouth open with the spoon of horn; and to keep the feet from contracting, an easy stool was employed. These observances were the same for a ruler, a great officer, and an ordinary officer. (22)

Shi meaning (2) "personator; sacrificial representative of a dead person's spirit" is discussed below.

Meaning (3) figuratively expands shi to "corpse-like", which can contextually mean either "motionless; calm; quiescent" or "inactive; negligent; remiss". A Shijing ode (245) laments that, "the good men sit motionless and silent". Karlgren explains, "'The good men act the corpse,' play the part of a representative of the dead at a sacrifice, who sits still and silent during the whole ceremony; here then, remain inactive, do nothing to help." The Lunyu ("Confucian Analects") uses shi to praise Confucius, "In bed, he did not lie like a corpse." Commentators disagree whether this means "sleep with the arms and legs sprawled out" or "sleep facing the north (the land of the dead)".

Meaning (4) is defined as Chinese chen 陳 "lay out; set forth, array; arrange; display". Examples in classic texts range from specifically "lay out (a corpse)" to generally "lay out; set out; arrange". The Liji distinguishes between shi 尸 "uncoffined corpse" and jiu 柩 (with the "wood radical" and a jiu 匛 "long; enduring" phonetic) "coffined corpse": "(The corpse) on the couch is called [shi] (the laid out); when it is put into the coffin, that is called [jiu] (being in the long home)." A Shijing poem (185) refers to men called off to war, "There are mothers who set forth the (sacrificial) dishes."

Meaning (5) of shi is defined as zhu 主 "master; manage, preside; spirit tablet, ancestral tablet". The Chuci uses shi asking about King Wu of Zhou, whose father King Wen of Zhou did not live to see the conquering of the previous dynasty, Shang-Yin: "When Wu set out to kill Yin, why was he so grieved? He went into the battle carrying the 'corpse.' Why was he in such haste?" Commentators disagree whether this shi means zhu, specifically muzhu 木主 "wooden spirit/ancestral tablet" or jiu "corpse in a coffin". Hawkes justifies translating "corpse": "According to some accounts it was the 'spirit tablet' of his dead father [King Wen] which King Wu carried in his chariot to battle. But I think the poet understood him to have taken the actual corpse, and was surprised that he had not waited to bury it."

The sinologists Eduard Erkes and Bernhard Karlgren debated this Chuci usage of shi "corpse; spirit tablet". Erkes proposed that the zhu was a wooden ancestral tablet shaped in the image of the deceased. Karlgren disagreed and argued that the zhu was phallic shaped:

He seems to think that the substitution of [muzhu] 'wooden tablet' for the corpse (if really a corpse is intended; the word shi is ambiguous) proves the [muzhu] to have been an image of the corpse, and therefore he translates [muzhu] by 'wooden statue.' Nothing could be more arbitrary. The [muzhu], wooden ancestral tablet, was the resting place of the ancestor's spirit, once his body was dead and decomposed. In this sense it was a substitute for his body, his spiritual force had entered it, and therefore it was carried into battle, bringing this mental force of his into play on the side of his descendant.

Erkes countered Karlgren by citing other texts describing a human-shaped muzhu "wooden lord". For instance, the Shiji ("Record of History") records this King Wu story with muzhu instead of shi: "He (viz. Wu-Wang) made a wooden image of Wen-Wang and took it with [him] on his carriage into the battle." Erkes further suggested, "very probably the custom of carrying a [muzhu] into battle had developed from an earlier one of taking the body itself, and that therefore the [muzhu] was something representing the corpse, i.e., an image of the deceased."

Meaning (6) includes some semantically unrelated usages of shi. Shi 尸 is an ancient place name (in Henan); a surname (e.g., the Syncretist philosopher Shizi 尸子, c. 390 – 330 BCE); and a variant of shi 鳲 (which is used in bird names like shijiu 鳲鳩 "cuckoo; turtledove").

=== Pronunciations and etymologies ===
The Standard Chinese shī pronunciation of 尸 phonologically descends from (c. 6th century CE) Middle Chinese and (c. 6th century BCE) Old Chinese. Compare these Middle and Old Chinese reconstructions of shi 尸 "corpse" and yi 夷 "barbarian" (which anciently had interchangeable characters): śi < *śjər 尸and i < *djər 夷 (Bernhard Karlgren, syij < *hljij 尸and yij < *ljɨj 夷, and śi < *lhi 尸 and ji < *ləi 夷.

There are several hypothetical etymologies for shi "corpse". Karlgren proposed that si < *sjər 死 "die, dead" and shi < *śjər 尸 "the dead, corpse" were etymologically cognate. Paul K. Benedict suggested possible Proto-Sino-Tibetan roots for shi: either *(s-)raw "corpse; carcass" or *siy "die". Schuessler hypothesizes a semantic development from *li 夷 "extend; expose; display; set out; spread out" to *lhi 尸 "to spread out; lie down flat (in order to sleep); motionless; to set forth (sacrificial dishes)", to "personator of a dead ancestor", to "corpse". He rejects Karlgren's assumption that shi "corpse" is cognate to si "to die", "because the MC [Middle Chinese] initial ś- (< *lh-, *nh-, *hj-) never derives from an *s-, except when they share an initial *l or *n."

=== Translations ===
English translations of the ceremonial shi 尸 include personator, impersonator, representative, medium, and shaman. Carr reviews the choices.

Obviously, rendering this into English is problematic because there is no Western analogy for the ceremonial shi 'corpse.' Personator is chosen as the nearest English translation. Impersonator would be possible, but this word implies falsehood, which was not originally associated with the shi. Representative is too general in meaning, and does not usually have a sense of spirituality, unless modified by of the dead/ancestor. Paper [1995] suggests Incorporator of the Dead, which has a parallel 'one who embodies' etymology, but the derivate words incorporate and incorporation commonly have other meanings. Medium and shaman are similar with shi in meaning and are part of Chinese traditions; however, the descriptions of a dignified personator are unlike the spirit-possession of either. Another translational tactic would be to coin a nonce word, such as Waley's [1937] "the Dead One," Eberhard's [1968] "death boy," or Wilhelm's [1967] "corpse boy," but the sense of such a coinage is not always clear. Therefore, in the absence of a better English word, personator will translate this meaning of shi.

== Early descriptions ==
Zhou dynasty classic texts (c. 11th–3rd centuries BCE) use the word shi 尸 hundreds of times. Lothar von Falkenhausen contrasts the frequently recorded shi "personator" with the rarely noted wu 巫 "shaman; spirit medium".

At ancestral sacrifices, the ancestral spirits descend into individuals designated from among their descendants, the "Impersonators" (shi 尸). Occupying their ritual rôle by virtue of their kinship position vis-à-vis the ancestor that is sacrificed to, the Impersonators are not trained religious specialists like the Spirit Mediums. Although it has been speculated that the actions of the shi may have originally involved trance and possession, the surviving source materials—none earlier than the Western Zhou period—show them as staid and passive, acting with the utmost demeanor and dignity.

Some early shi meanings are contextually ambiguous. For instance, the Yijing ("Book of Changes") uses yu shi 輿尸 "carry corpses; corpse carrier" twice for Hexagram 7: "Perchance the army carries corpses in the wagon. Misfortune ... Let the eldest lead the army. The younger transports corpses. Then perseverance brings misfortune." Richard Wilhelm summarizes the Yijing commentaries.

Here we have a choice of two explanations. One points to defeat because someone other than the chosen leader interferes with the command; the other is similar in its general meaning, but the expression, "carries corpses in the wagon," is interpreted differently. At burials and at sacrifices to the dead it was customary in China for the deceased to whom the sacrifice was made to be represented by a boy of the family, who sat in the dead man's place and was honored as his representative. On the basis of this custom the text is interpreted as meaning that a "corpse boy" is sitting in the wagon, or, in other words, that authority is not being exercised by the proper leaders but has been usurped by others.

Marshall concludes this hexagram refers to carrying a corpse, and compares the "Israelites carrying the Ark of the Covenant into battle against the Philistines".

=== Shijing ===
The Shijing ("Classic of Poetry", c. 11th – 6th centuries BCE) contains early and detailed descriptions of personation ceremonies, in the following themes.

There is an abundance of sacrificial wine and food (odes 166, 209, 210, and 248) shared by both the ancestral spirits (through the personator) and their descendants. Drunkenness is frequently mentioned: 209/5 "The spirits [note: 'souls' not 'liquor'] are all drunk," 209/6 "all are happy; they are drunk," 247/1, 2 "We are drunk with wine," and 248/5 "the representative of the (dead) princes comes and feasts and is befumed (by the spirits); the good wine makes you merry." Most significantly, the ancestral spirits speak directly through the intoxicated personators (166, 210, and 247), approve of the sacrificial offerings, and bless their descendants (166, 209, 210, 247, and 248).

Shi "personator" occurs fourteen times in two pairs of consecutive Shijing odes (209–210 and 247–248). Ode 209 says "we make (the representative of the dead) sit at ease, we (assist him =) encourage him to eat" and "The august representative of the dead then rises, the drums and bells (by their sound) escort away the representative." The following ode 210 describes sacrificial wine and food, "he presents them to our representative of the dead and to our guests."

Shijing odes 247 and 248, which portray ancestral feasts to the Zhou royal house, exclusively use the term gongshi 公尸 with the modifier gong 公 "prince; duke; public; palace; effort". Compare these gongshi translations: "representative of the (dead) princes" (Karlgren), "personators of your ancestors" (Legge admitting "The expression 公尸, 'ducal personators,' is somewhat difficult to account for"), "impersonator of the Ancient", "ducal Dead", or "Dead One" (Waley, noting "Impersonator of a former Duke or ruler"). Ode 247 (Jizui 既醉 "Already Drunk") describes a sacrificial feast for ancestral spirits, and says "the representative of the (dead) princes makes a happy announcement".

Ode 248 (Fuyi 鳧鷖 "Wild Ducks") describes another feast, which commentators say was held on the following day to reward the personator, and details sacrificial offerings and ancestral blessings.

The wild ducks are on the [Jing] (river); the representative of the (dead) princes comes and feasts and is at peace; your wine is clear, your viands are fragrant; the representative feasts and drinks; felicity and blessings come and (achieve, complete you =) make you perfect.

The wild ducks are on the sands; the representative of the (dead) princes comes and feasts and (approves =) finds it good; your wine is plentiful, your viands are fine; the representative feasts and drinks; felicity and blessings come and (act for =) favor you.
The wild ducks are on the island; the representative of the (dead) prices comes and feasts and reposes; your wine is strained, your viands are sliced; the representative feasts and drinks; felicity and blessings come and descend on you.
The wild ducks are at the junction of the river; the representative of the (dead) princes comes and feasts and is (treated in temple-fashion =) revered; the feast is in the temple, that is where felicity and blessings descend; the representative feasts and drinks; felicity and blessings come and are piled up (heavily =) amply on you.

The wild ducks are in the gorge; the representative of the (dead) princes comes and feasts and is befumed (by the spirits); the good wine makes you merry; the roast and broiled things are fragrant; the representative feasts and drinks; there will be no after trouble.

Besides the Shijing, other texts refer to shi frequently drinking sacrificial jiu 酒 "alcoholic beverage; liquor", which Paper interprets as a ritual means to induce hallucinations of ancestral spirits. Based upon a Liji ceremony describing a shi personator drinking nine cups of jiu, with an estimated alcohol content from 5% to 8%, and volume measurements of Zhou bronze sacrificial cups, Paper calculates a "conservative estimate is that the shi consumed between 2.4 and 3.9 ounces of pure alcohol (equivalent to between 5 and 8 bar shots of eighty-proof liquor)."

=== Child personators ===
Several texts refer to a Chinese custom that a personator should be a child of the same sex as the dead ancestor, preferably either a legitimate grandson or his wife. However, personation by younger relatives, who were of lower social status than their elders, created an exception to traditional Chinese culture. The earliest textual reference comes from the Mengzi ("Book of Mencius") questioning the status shown to a younger brother during the personation ceremony.

You should ask him, "Which do you respect most,—your uncle, or your younger brother?" He will answer, "My uncle." Ask him again, "If your younger brother be personating a dead ancestor, to which do you show the greater respect,—to him or to your uncle?" He will say, "To my younger brother." You can go on, "But where is the respect due, as you said, to your uncle?" He will reply to this, "I show the respect to my younger brother because of the position which he occupies." (6)

The Liji reiterates that personation contradicted the established social hierarchy (18): "Thus it is that there are two among his subjects whom the ruler does not treat as subjects. When one is personating (his ancestor) he does not treat him as such, nor does he treat his master as such." Another Liji passage (7) explains: "A rule of propriety says, 'A superior man may carry his grandson in his arms, but not his son.' This tells us that a grandson may be the personator of his deceased grandfather (at sacrifices), but a son cannot be so of his father." When a grandson personated his grandfather's spirit, it reversed the normal family hierarchy and a father would have to worship his own son.

Scholars have differing hypotheses explaining why a grandchild would make the most suitable personator. Marcel Granet said the basic reason was a predominance of uterine over agnatic primogeniture; the grandfather is the closest of the uterine relatives, and thus closer to his grandson than the father is. Wolfram Eberhard explained that a child makes the best personator owing to the ancient Chinese belief that a soul is small. Julian Jaynes mentions a Greek parallel: the philosopher Iamblichus wrote that "young and simple persons" make the most suitable mediums. Stephen Bokenkamp mentions examples besides shi rituals.

In China, possessions by spirits that occurred outside of this ritual scenario often involved younger members of the family as well. As in instances of mediumism around the world, the youthful and illiterate were regarded as more reliable conduits to the dead, since they could hardly be suspected of having fabricated their utterances and writings themselves. This fact brings to the fore questions of power. Women and junior male members of a family frequently found that mediumism was a way to bring attention to their own, otherwise easily ignored, concerns.

=== Female personators ===
Two ritual texts mention female personators. The Liji (15) describes a wife personating her husband's dead grandmother: "A wife, on festive occasions, even though it were on receiving a gift from the ruler, (only) made a curtsy. When seated as a personatrix (of the deceased grandmother of her husband), she did not bow with her head to her hands, but made the curtsy." The Yili (14) euphemistically says a female personator should preferably not be the wife of a concubine's grandson; "A man personates a dead man, and a woman a woman. In the latter case a woman of a different surname is chosen, and as such not one of inferior standing."

=== Historical changes in personation ===
Several early texts and commentaries reiterate a traditional history of personation beginning in the second millennium BCE as a sacred communion with ancestral spirits, but ending as a drinking party in the late 1st millennium BCE. When the personation ceremony supposedly originated during the Xia dynasty (c. 2100 – c. 1600 BCE), a personator would make contact with the dead ancestral spirit before sitting down to eat and drink. During the Yin or Shang dynasty (c. 1600 – 1046 BCE), a personator would sometimes sit down without having contacted the spirit, and by the late Zhou dynasty (1045–256 BCE), a personation ceremony became a revelry with several personators repeatedly making toasts and drinking sacrificial wines.

Two Liji chapters describe how personation rituals changed during the Zhou period.

Under the [Zhou] dynasty the representatives of the dead sat. Their monitors and cup-suppliers observed no regular rules. The usages were the same (as those of Yin [Shang]), and the underlying principle was one. Under the [Xia] dynasty, the personators had stood till the sacrifice was ended (whereas) under the Yin [Shang] they sat. Under [Zhou], when the cup went round among all, there were six personators. [Zengzi] said, "The usages of [Zhou] might be compared to a subscription club." (10)

(When the representative of the departed) had made the libation with the [jia] cup, or the horn, (the sacrificer) was told (to bow to him) to put him at ease. Anciently, the representative stood when nothing was being done; when anything was being done, he sat. He personated the spirit. The officer of prayer was the medium of communication between him and the sacrificer. (11)

Later sources repeat this legendary history of personation. For example, He Xiu 何休's 2nd-century commentary to the Chunqiu ("Spring and Autumn Annals") Gongyang Zhuan says, "The Xia had standing personators, the Shang [Yin] had sitting personators, and the Zhou had six personators who would make serial toasts." Granet mentions the Zhou personation parties: "It was not long before this archaic custom was criticized by the ritualists. When the sacrifices were offered simultaneously to several ancestors each of whom was represented, the ceremony was found indeed to assume a displeasing likeness to a picnic."

=== Doubts about personation ===
The above Liji description of Zhou "subscription club" personation ceremonies quotes Confucius's student and compiler Zengzi (505–436 BCE). The Liji contains three passages where Zengzi questions his teacher about whether personators were needed for ancestral rituals. For instance:

[Zengzi] asked, "Is it necessary that there should be a representative of the dead in sacrifices? Or may he be dispensed with as when the satisfying offerings are made to the dead?" Confucius said, "In sacrificing to a full-grown man for whom there have been the funeral rites, there must be such a representative, who should be a grandson; and if the grandson is too young, someone must be employed to carry him in his arms. If there be no grandson, some one of the same surname should be selected for the occasion. In sacrificing to the one who had died prematurely, there are (only) the satisfying offerings, for he was not full-grown. To sacrifice to a full-grown man, for whom there have been the funeral rites without a representative, would be to treat him as if he had died prematurely." (7)

== Hypothetical origins ==
Chinese scholars have long disagreed about when and how shi personation originated. Henri Doré summarizes the four principal opinions, which are worth quoting in full.

The first opinion is that personation was a bygone superstition. The Tang dynasty historian Du You criticizes the shi:

The ancients employed a personator. This rite deserves censure, and has been abolished by our great Worthies. One vied with the other in practicing it. Now that an era of progress has set in, and these silly customs have disappeared, it is important not to revive them; common sense bids to refrain from them. Some half-baked literati of our days would fain re-establish this ceremony of the personator. This is quite absurd.

The second opinion is that the personator was not the agent of the departed, but merely its metaphorical representative or shenxiang 神象 "image of the spirit". The Han dynasty historian Ban Gu explains:

The personator is found in the ceremony wherein sacrifice is offered to ancestors, because the soul emitting no perceptible sounds and having no visible form, the loving sentiment of filial piety finds no means of displaying itself, hence a personator has been chosen to whom meats are offered, after which he breaks the bowls, quite rejoiced, as if his own father had eaten plenty. The personator, drinking abundantly, imparts the illusion that it is the soul which is satiated.

Carr notes, "This passage sounds as though Ban had personally observed a personation ceremony."

Some Qing dynasty scholars held a third opinion, namely, that the personator was bearer of the ancestral tablet. The Jishuo quanzhen 集說詮真 "Collected Sayings Explaining Truth" says, "The filial son chooses a personator to carry the tablet, but not to be the resting place of the soul of the dead person. His intention is therefore manifest." The Yuzhou dayiyi 宇宙大疑議 "Discussion of Universal Great Doubts" says: "The personator is employed during sacrifices to the dead, in order to carry the ancestral tablet ... hence there is no need of having such a one immediately after death, as the tablet is not yet erected."

The fourth opinion refutes the first three condemnations of personators as mere representatives or tablet-holders for the dead, and contends that a personator was temporarily the seat of a dead ancestor's soul. Two leading Neo-Confucianist philosophers held this judgment. Cheng Yi writes:

The ancients, when sacrificing to the dead, employed the personator, because the soul and the vital force of the dead person after being separated from the body, seek an agent of the same nature. Now, men being all of the same kind, the father and the children being all of one family and of the same stock, the soul of the departed person is requested to come and establish its seat in one of them as in an agent.

His follower Zhu Xi concurs:

In ancient times all employed a personator when sacrificing to the dead. Since the descendants continue the life of their ancestors, the personator shares, therefore, in the life of the departed person, and the ancestor's soul descends undoubtedly upon his descendants, and reposes therein to enjoy the sacrifice offered.

Carr offers a contemporary explanation for shi "corpse" personation: Julian Jaynes's psychological bicameral mentality hypothesis. Jaynes proposed that human "consciousness", meaning self-awareness and cognition, began evolving around 1000 BCE. Prior to that, ancient people had "bicameral mentality" in which one part of the brain "spoke" (often in an authority figure's voice) while another part listened and obeyed.

According to the theory of the bicameral mind, hallucinations of a person in some authority could continue after death as an everyday matter. And hence the almost universal custom of feeding the corpses after death, and burying them with the appurtenances of life.

If the original personators were bicameral, they could have directly hallucinated voices from a shi "corpse". Carr notes the historical correspondence between Jaynes's first millennium BCE timeline for the breakdown of the bicameral mind in other parts of the world and the 11th–3rd centuries BCE personation practices in China.

Several early sources give variations of the same chronicle about the personation ceremony. It began during the Xia Dynasty, when personators would communicate on behalf of the dead; continued during the Shang and Western Zhou Dynasties; but was criticized and discontinued after the Eastern Zhou Dynasty when personators were no longer able to speak for the dead.

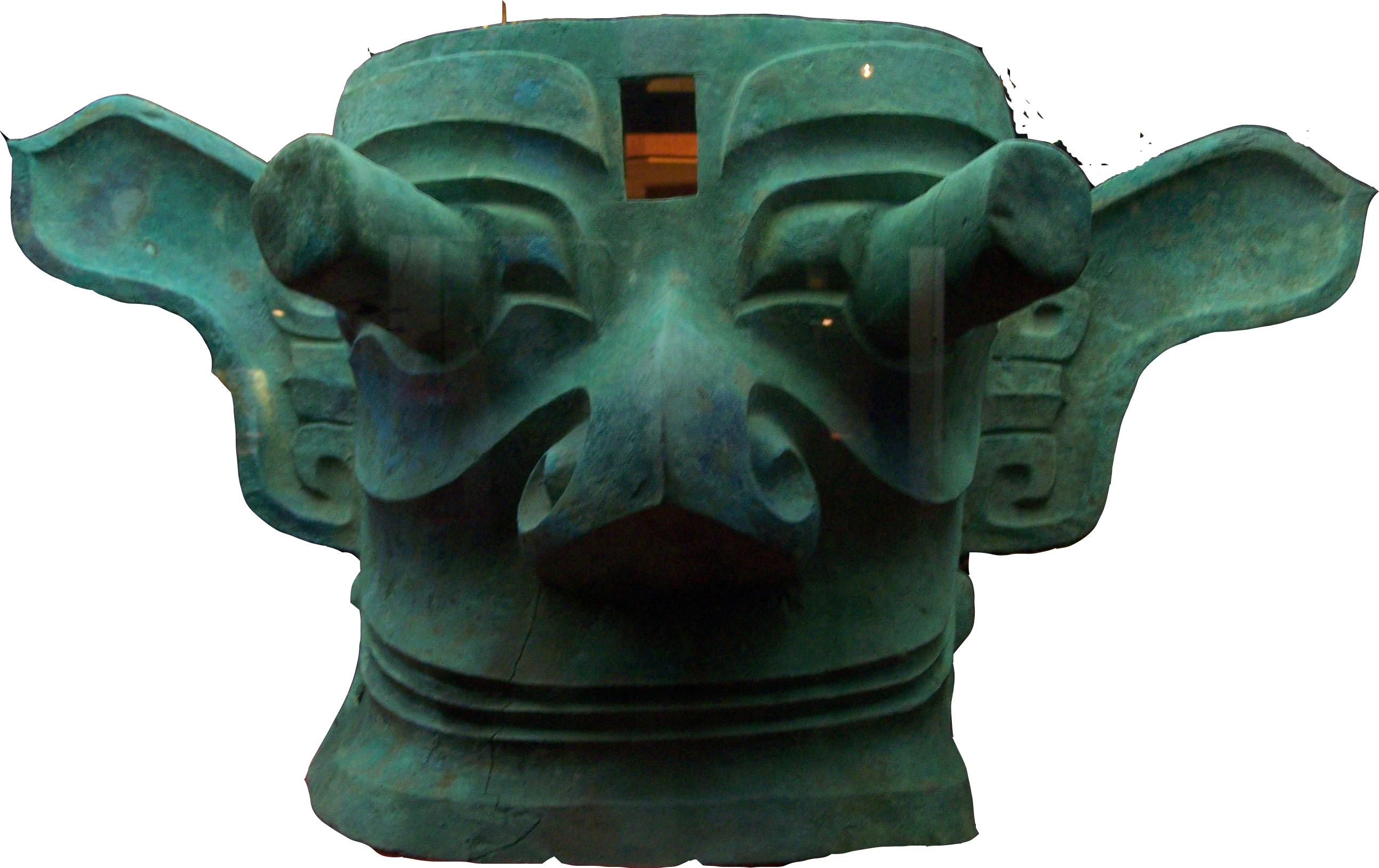
Sanxingdui bronze mask

Wearing ritual masks is a recent hypothesis about shi. Paper suggested the possibility that Shang and Zhou shi wore bronze masks "symbolizing the spirit of the dead to whom the sacrifices were offered". Liu believes the phantasmagoric bronze masks discovered at Sanxingdui, dating from c. 12th–11th centuries BCE, might have been ritually worn by shi 尸.

The shi was generally a close, young relative who wore a costume (possibly including a mask) reproducing the features of the dead person. The shi was an impersonator, that is, a person serving as a reminder of the ancestor to whom sacrifice was being offered. During such a ceremony, the impersonator was much more than an actor in a drama. Although the exact meaning may have been different, the group of Sanxingdui masked figures in bronze all have the character of an impersonator. It is likely the masks were used to impersonate and identify with certain supernatural beings in order to effect some communal good.
