= DPP v Armstrong =

English criminal law case

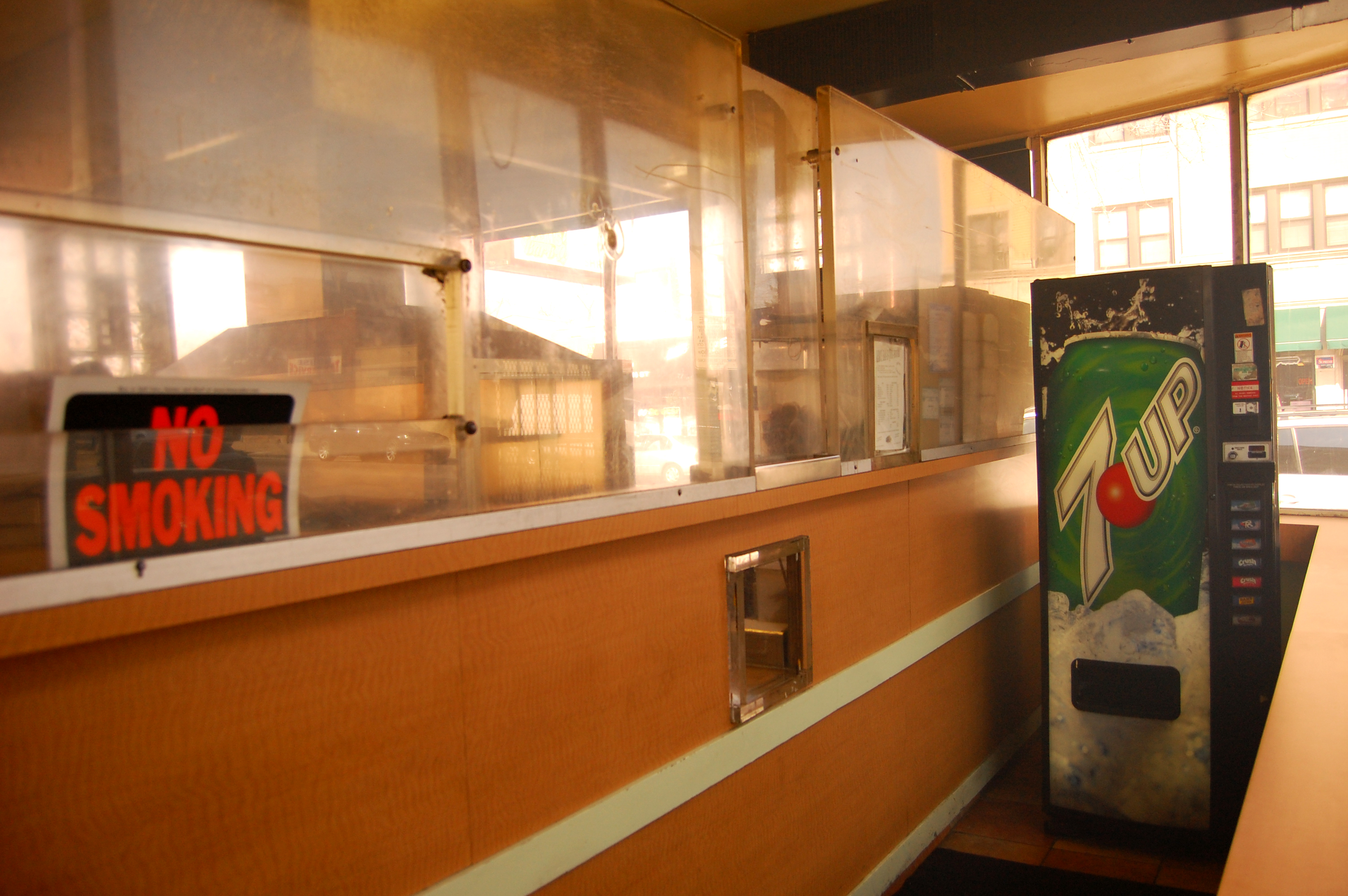
- Held: to request an illegal item which does not exist in the hands of the intended vendor, but would be a severe offence to sell, amounts to incitement of an offence in the law of England and Wales.
- Court: High Court of Justice (Queen's Bench Division)
- Full case name: Director of Public Prosecutions v Andrew Armstrong
- Decided: 5 November 1999
- Citation: 1999 EWHC QB 270; 45 LS Gaz 32, 143 Sol Jo LB 279, [2000] Crim LR 379
- Cases cited: R v Quail (1866) 4 F & F 1976; R v Fitzmaurice (1983) 76 Cr App R 17
- Legislation cited: Common law

Case history
- Prior action: None
- Subsequent action: None

Court membership
- Judges sitting: Lord Justice Tuckey, Mr Justice Moses

Keywords
- Incitement; impossibility to complete the offence

DPP v Armstrong is a decision of the Queen's Bench Division of the English High Court of Justice dealing with incitement when the offence incited could be deemed "impossible" to complete, on the precise facts. It was ruled that this impossibility (and more specifically complete lack of means and/or intention by another person to complete the very specific offence incited) is irrelevant to the incitement itself and therefore a conviction is sustainable.

== Facts ==
Armstrong approached a police informer seeking child pornography. The informer introduced Armstrong to a police officer acting undercover. Armstrong proceeded with this contact and made specific arrangements for a transaction which would be illegal.

He was arrested and charged with inciting the officer to distribute indecent photographs of children contrary to common law. In fact the police officer had no intention of providing child pornography.

== Argument ==
The case was heard by a stipendiary magistrate where the defence argued that because Armstrong and the officer lacked a shared intention to commit an offence, Armstrong should be acquitted. He was referred to the cases of R v Shaw and R v Curr and ruled that on these authorities, the lack of an intention by the police officer to supply child pornography was fatal to the prosecution case, and acquitted. The prosecutor appealed.

== Decision ==
Lord Justice Tuckey, having reviewed the common law and academic opinion, considered that neither implied a requirement to prove shared intention as contended by Armstrong. Turning to those two authorities (Shaw and Curr), he further stated that there was nothing in either to imply such a requirement. He ruled that:

...it was not necessary for the prosecutor to show that the officer intended to supply child pornography to the respondent. His intention was irrelevant. The offence of incitement was committed when he was asked to commit the offence of supplying child pornography with the intention on the part of the respondent that in doing so he would be committing a criminal offence.

The trial magistrate had two questions for the appeal:

1. Was I correct to decide that the Respondent had not incited DC Tobin to distribute indecent material because [he] never had any intention of doing so?
2. Was I correct in holding in law that the evidence of the police officer meant the offence was impossible to perform?

The appellate court found "no" as to both. Accordingly the court (the only words of the other judge were a standard concurrence: "I agree.") rejected the defence of impossibility and the magistrates' ruling was quashed.

The offence of incitement simply entails the defendant incite another to commit a criminal offence, whether or not that offence is committed. It is not necessary that the person incited should have the mens rea for the offence incited.

== Reconciliation of precedents ==
Professor John Smith noted in commentary to the DPP v Armstrong case that the distinguishing of the troublesome ruling in R v Shaw [1994] – effectively shunning it – was to some logicians unconvincing but ingeniously pointed out the flaw in the indictment there which was a welcome way of largely overruling R v Shaw, a decision of court of higher official rank but similar bench of eminent judges, considered of binding, not persuasive precedent. It has limited Shaw to its peculiar indictment's wording, which hinged on its poor construction in relation to an alleged theft incitement.

The judgment noted and contrasted itself to the approved suggested state illegality scenario of framing a "young man" by a detection-target-seeking police officer and an agent provocateur, as envisaged by Lord Diplock in R v Sang in the highest court twenty years earlier.
