= Personation of a juror =

Common law offence in England and Wales

Personation of a juror is a common law offence in England and Wales, where a person impersonates a juror in a civil or criminal trial. As a common law offence it is punishable by unlimited imprisonment and/or an unlimited fine. Personation of a juror also constitutes a contempt of court.

There is no requirement to prove that the defendant had any corrupt motive or a specific intention to deceive other than the fact that they entered the jury-box and took the oath in someone else's name, and it is no defence that they did not know what they did to be wrong. If a juror has been personated, the trial in which he sat can be voided.

== See also ==
- Perverting the course of justice
