= Reasonable doubt =

Legal standard of proof

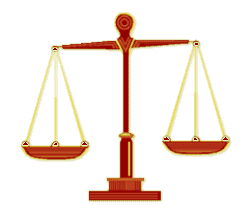

Beyond (a) reasonable doubt is a legal standard of proof required to reach a criminal conviction in some adversarial legal systems. It is a higher standard of proof than the standard of balance of probabilities (US English: preponderance of the evidence) commonly used in civil cases. The prosecution bears the burden of presenting compelling evidence that establishes guilt beyond a reasonable doubt; if the trier of fact is not convinced to that standard, the accused is entitled to an acquittal.

== Historical origins ==
According to Yale Law professor James Q. Whitman, the phrase "reasonable doubt" evolved from Christian theology and originated as a moral consideration for judges and jurors to protect them against committing the mortal sin of bloodguilt:

"The rule was simply never designed to protect the accused, nor even serve as a standard of proof in the proper sense of the term. ... A judge who sentenced an accused person to a blood punishment while experiencing 'doubt' about guilt committed a mortal sin, and thus put his own salvation at risk. These were injunctions that were applied to judges in every part of western Christendom, from Spain to Germany, from Italy to England."

As a response to jurors concerned with possibly convicting an innocent person, English courts by the 1780s began instructing jurors that they could safely ignore any doubts that were not "reasonable" in choosing to convict a defendant. Thus, as originally designed, the "reasonable doubt" standard made it easier for juries to convict, rather than harder. American courts soon also adopted this standard, with the U.S. Supreme Court finding in a 1970 ruling (in re Winship) that the formulation beyond a reasonable doubt developed "as late as 1798".

== In practice ==
Because the defendant is presumed innocent, prosecutors must prove each element of the crime charged beyond a reasonable doubt in order to obtain a conviction. This means the evidence must leave little actual doubt in the mind of the judge or jury that the defendant committed the alleged offense. Unreasonable or purely speculative doubts are excluded, whereas doubts grounded in tangible conflicts within the evidence or its sufficiency warrant an acquittal. In many jurisdictions, the phrase "reasonable doubt" remains purposefully undefined in jury instructions to reduce confusion, although critics argue that the lack of a clear definition may itself cause confusion.

Academic literature has identified several possible interpretations of what "reasonable doubt" entails. One approach focuses on whether a doubt can be articulable, meaning grounded in a coherent reason or an alternative narrative, rather than in vague distrust or pure speculation. Critics note, however, that this risks shifting the burden of proof to the defendant if they must articulate reasons to doubt guilt. Another approach frames the inquiry around whether a "reasonable person" would entertain the doubt. But critics observe that this easily becomes circular: a doubt is "reasonable" if a "reasonable" person would hold it, offering little additional guidance. A third, so-called "probabilistic" approach suggests adopting a numerical threshold (e.g., 90% or 95% certainty). Some scholars contend that such explicit quantification reflects the actual logic behind proof standards and is consistent with longstanding principles about balancing the costs of wrongful convictions and wrongful acquittals. Others define the beyond reasonable doubt standard as a fact-finder's justified belief or conviction of the defendant's guilt in terms of probabilities. Fourthly, some argue that the reasonability of doubt depends on the crime being considered: for instance, that jurors should take a wider interpretation when someone is accused of serious crimes that result in severe punishments.

Most legal systems avoid placing an explicit numerical figure on "reasonable doubt" and rely instead on jurors' or judges' subjective judgment; however, empirical studies show that laypeople vary widely in the probability threshold they associate with "beyond a reasonable doubt." Some scholars have proposed that a probabilistic or numerical approach—e.g., equating "reasonable doubt" to a particular probability threshold—can mitigate these inconsistencies. In the United States, some states allow judges to paraphrase "beyond a reasonable doubt," while others allow judges to explain the phrase if jurors are confused, while still other states do not permit any additional explanation or clarification at all; recent scholarship suggests jurors frequently fail to grasp the high burden (and risk convicting the innocent) as a result of inadequate instruction.

== Definitions and critiques ==
Critics of the standard, including some jurists and legal scholars, point out that the instruction "beyond a reasonable doubt" can be circular: it does not clarify how certain the jury must be, only that it must be "more certain" than other standards (such as preponderance of the evidence). Various courts have tried to elaborate with phrases such as "the kind of doubt that would make a person hesitate to act," or "moral certainty," but these have often been deemed unhelpful or potentially confusing.

Research suggests that where the law intends a clear distinction between "preponderance," "clear and convincing evidence," and "beyond a reasonable doubt," jurors given only verbal formulations struggle to separate these levels in practice. Studies of mock jurors have found no consistent difference in outcomes under purely verbal instructions. By contrast, instructions incorporating some numerical guidance produce more consistent results.

== By jurisdiction ==
=== England and Wales ===
In England and Wales, the modern practice is that judges often avoid the phrase "beyond reasonable doubt" in favor of telling jurors they must be "sure" of the defendant's guilt. This rewording follows appeals court rulings expressing concern that the traditional formula might confuse jurors.

=== Canada ===
The Supreme Court of Canada has emphasized that jurors should be told the prosecution bears the entire burden and that the doubt must be based on reason and common sense. In R. v. Lifchus, the Court advised jurors that absolute certainty is not required, only that they be "sure" based on the evidence, and that proof of probable guilt is insufficient. Later cases, such as R. v. Starr, clarified that "proof beyond a reasonable doubt" lies much closer to absolute certainty than to a balance of probabilities.

=== United States ===
In the United States, the notion that an accused must be found guilty "beyond a reasonable doubt" is constitutionally mandated under the Due Process Clause. Although the Supreme Court has discussed this standard in several decisions, it has resisted providing a strict definition; indeed, it has stated that attempts to define the term often "do not usually result in making it any clearer to the minds of the jury." Critics argue that juror misunderstanding of what "reasonable doubt" requires contributes to inconsistent outcomes and complicates the fairness of the justice system.

Many proposals to quantify "beyond a reasonable doubt" draw upon the so-called Blackstone's ratio—for example, equating "It is better that ten guilty persons escape than that one innocent suffer" to a 90% threshold of certainty. Courts vary substantially in how they refer to or adopt Blackstone's formulation. Some imply a ratio of 1:5 or 1:10, while others have cited values as high as 1:99, resulting in no single uniform benchmark nationwide. Recent scholarship has attempted to catalogue the implicit level of certainty state-by-state.

=== Japan ===
Japan uses a high standard of persuasion in criminal cases, influenced by the principle of in dubio pro reo (when in doubt, rule for the accused), but judges sometimes diverge in how strictly they apply it.

== See also ==
- Error of impunity
- Intellectual humility
- Metacognition
- Moral certainty
- Probable cause
- Reasonable suspicion
- Reasonable person
- Burden of proof (law)
