= Personation =

Legal term

Personation (rather than impersonation) is a primarily legal term, meaning "to assume the identity of another person with intent to deceive". It is often used for the kind of voter fraud where an individual votes in an election, whilst pretending to be a different elector. It is also used when charging a person who portrays themselves as a police officer.

Personation appears as a crime in the Canadian Criminal Code with the meaning simply of impersonation.

In the U.S., the New York State Penal Law defines the crime of false personation as simply the act of pretending to be another, a Class B misdemeanor; those who assume the identity of another in order to further another crime can be charged with second-degree criminal impersonation, a Class A misdemeanor. Posing as a police officer for any reason, or as a physician in order to forge a prescription or otherwise obtain substances so controlled, is first-degree criminal impersonation, a Class E felony.

Many jurisdictions allow electors to nominate an individual to vote on their behalf, often known as proxy voting. Whilst voting with an invalid proxy form could be considered personation, it is usual for an intent to deceive to be required for such an act to be considered criminal.

Personation is an offence in law in England and Wales: see List of English criminal offences § Forgery, personation and cheating.

== See also ==
- Shi (personator)
