= Contempt of the sovereign =

Contempt of the sovereign (also called contempt of statute) was an ancient doctrine in English law dating from medieval times, and now obsolete. It was the crime imputed by common law whereby a person disobeyed an act of parliament which did not say what the penalty was nor how it was to be enforced – the crime itself was recognised. The doctrine was based on the original custom that an act of Parliament was an expression of the sovereign's will, enacted with the "advice and consent" of Parliament. It has been mainly overturned in precedent since the English interregnum. Thus in modern jurisprudence, contravening a statute is not a crime unless the statute expressly says so in clear terms.

The last time it was used was in 1840.

It is not to be confused with lèse-majesté.
