= Serious Crime Act 2007 =

Act of the Parliament of the United Kingdom

Serious Crime Act 2007 (Note: Section 95.)
- Act of Parliament
- Parliament of the United Kingdom
- Long title: An Act to make provision about serious crime prevention orders; to create offences in respect of the encouragement or assistance of crime; to enable information to be shared or processed to prevent fraud or for purposes relating to proceeds of crime; to enable data matching to be conducted both in relation to fraud and for other purposes; to transfer functions of the Director of the Assets Recovery Agency to the Serious Organised Crime Agency and other persons and to make further provision in connection with the abolition of the Agency and the office of Director; to amend the Proceeds of Crime Act 2002 in relation to certain investigations and in relation to accredited financial investigators, management receivers and enforcement receivers, cash recovery proceedings and search warrants; to extend stop and search powers in connection with incidents involving serious violence; to make amendments relating to Her Majesty's Revenue and Customs in connection with the regulation of investigatory powers; and for connected purposes.
- Citation: 2007 c. 27
- Introduced by: Tony McNulty MP, Minister for Security, Counter Terrorism and Police (Commons); Baroness Scotland of Asthal, Minister of State, Home Office (Lords)
- Territorial extent: England and Wales; Scotland; Northern Ireland; (Note: Section 93.)

Dates
- Royal assent: 30 October 2007
- Commencement: 15 February 2008 (Note: Section 94.)
Other legislation
Amends	Theft Act 1968; Misuse of Drugs Act 1971; Sexual Offences (Amendment) Act 1976; Criminal Law Act 1977; Magistrates' Courts Act 1980; Criminal Appeal (Northern Ireland) Act 1980; Limitation Act 1980; Civil Jurisdiction and Judgments Act 1982; Football Spectators Act 1989; Computer Misuse Act 1990; Sexual Offences (Amendment) Act 1992; Criminal Justice Act 1993; Police Act 1996; International Criminal Court Act 2001; Crime (International Co-operation) Act 2003; Public Audit (Wales) Act 2004; Tribunals, Courts and Enforcement Act 2007
Amended by	Protection of Freedoms Act 2012; Co-operative and Community Benefit Societies Act 2014; Modern Slavery Act 2015; Policing and Crime Act 2017; Sanctions and Anti-Money Laundering Act 2018; Counter-Terrorism and Border Security Act 2019; Sentencing Act 2020; Covert Human Intelligence Sources (Criminal Conduct) Act 2021; National Security Act 2023; Economic Crime and Corporate Transparency Act 2023; Border Security, Asylum and Immigration Act 2025

Status: Amended

History of passage through Parliament

Text of statute as originally enacted

Revised text of statute as amended

The Serious Crime Act 2007 (c. 27) is an act of the Parliament of the United Kingdom that makes several radical changes to English criminal law. In particular, it creates a new scheme of serious crime prevention orders to frustrate crime in England and Wales and in Northern Ireland, replaces the common law crime of incitement with a statutory offence of encouraging or assisting crime, makes provision as to disclosure and information sharing in order to prevent fraud, and abolishes the Assets Recovery Agency creating a new regime for the recovery of the proceeds of crime.

== Serious crime prevention orders ==
These provisions came into force on 6 April 2008.

Section 1 allows the High Court of Justice in England and Wales, and the High Court in Northern Ireland to make serious crime prevention orders containing prohibitions, restrictions, requirements and other terms where:

- It is satisfied that a person has been involved in serious crime, whether in England and Wales, or Northern Ireland or elsewhere; and
- It has reasonable grounds to believe that the order would protect the public by preventing, restricting or disrupting involvement by the person in serious crime in England and Wales, or Northern Ireland.

The burden of proof of these issues is on the person applying for the order on the balance of probabilities (ss. 35–36). Orders can only be imposed on individuals aged 18 or over (s.6) and only at the instigation of the Director of Public Prosecutions, Director of Revenue and Customs Prosecutions, Director of the Serious Fraud Office, or Director of Public Prosecutions for Northern Ireland (s.8). Orders must be of specified duration, not exceeding five years (s.14)

A serious crime prevention order is a new kind of civil injunction, breach of which is a crime, punishable on summary conviction in a magistrates' court by up to six months' imprisonment and a fine of up to level 5 on the standard scale. If convicted on indictment in the Crown Court, a person can be imprisoned for up to five years and given an unlimited fine (s. 25). The court also has powers of forfeiture (s. 26) and liquidation of a corporation (ss. 27–29).

A person has been involved in serious crime if he has (s. 2):

- Committed a serious offence;
- Facilitated the commission by another person of a serious offence; or
- Conducted himself in a way that was likely to facilitate the commission by himself or another person of a serious offence, whether or not such an offence was committed.

An order imposed on an individual, including a partner, can include requirements as to, but not limited to (s.5(3)):

- Financial, property or business dealings or holdings;
- Working arrangements;
- Means by which an individual communicates or associates with others, or the persons with whom he communicates or associates;
- Premises to which an individual has access;
- Use of any premises or item by an individual;
- Travel, whether within the United Kingdom, between the United Kingdom and other places or otherwise.

An order imposed on a body corporate, partnership or unincorporated association can include requirements as to, but not limited to (s.5(4)):

- Financial, property or business dealings or holdings;
- Types of agreements to which such persons may be a party;
- Provision of goods or services;
- Premises to which such persons have access;
- Use of any premises or item by such persons;
- Employment of staff.

An individual or organisation can be required to answer questions, or provide information or documents, at a time, within a period or at a frequency, and place, in a manner and form specified to a law enforcement officer](s.5(5)). A person cannot be ordered to give oral information (s.11) nor information in breach of legal professional privilege (s.12).

=== Serious offences ===
In England and Wales, a serious offence is one of those specified in Part 1 of Schedule 1, or one which "the court considers to be sufficiently serious to be treated for the purposes of the application or matter as if it were so specified." A similar definition exists for Northern Ireland (Sch.2/ Pt. 2). For crimes committed abroad, the test is whether they would be crimes in England and Wales, or Northern Ireland, or whether they are serious enough to be so treated (s.2).

Serious offences include (Sch. 1):

- Drug trafficking
- Human trafficking
- Arms trafficking
- Prostitution and Child sex
- Armed robbery
- Money laundering
- Fraud
- Tax evasion and revenue offences
- Corruption and bribery
- Blackmail
- Intellectual property offences
- Environmental crimes
- Attempting, conspiring, encouraging or assisting, or aiding or abetting such an offence.

=== Procedure ===
For an order to be valid, the subject must be represented at the hearing or served with notice (s.10). Third parties may make representations to the hearing if they would be affected by the order (s.9).

In England and Wales, where a person is convicted of a serious offence in the Crown Court, or committed for sentencing from the Magistrates' Court, the Crown Court can make an order (s.19).

The courts have wide powers to vary or discharge orders (ss.18-19, 20–22) and there is also a route of appeal from the Crown Court or High Court to the Court of Appeal by any party involved (ss.23-24).

A law enforcement agency may appoint authorised monitors to supervise compliance with the order and the court may order that the subject of an order pay the costs of the monitoring (ss.39-40).

== Encouraging or assisting crime ==
Part 2 of the Act came into force on 1 October 2008.

Section 59 abolishes the common law offence of incitement in England and Wales, and Northern Ireland, and replaces it with three new offences:

=== Intentionally encouraging or assisting an offence ===
Section 44 creates the crime of:

- Doing an act capable of encouraging or assisting the commission of an offence; and
- Intending to encourage or assist its commission.

A person is not taken to have intended to encourage or assist an offence merely because such encouragement or assistance was a foreseeable consequence of his act. The offence is triable in the same manner, summarily or on indictment, as the anticipated offence (s.55(1)) and, on conviction, a person can be sentenced to the same penalty as applies to the anticipated offence (s.58).

=== Encouraging or assisting an offence believing it will be committed ===
Section 45 creates the crime of:

- Doing an act capable of encouraging or assisting the commission of an offence; and
- Believing that:
  - The offence will be committed; and
  - His act will encourage or assist its commission.

The offence is triable in the same manner, summarily or on indictment, as the anticipated offence (s.55(1)) and, on conviction, a person can be sentenced to the same penalty as applies to the anticipated offence (s.58). Professor Dennis J. Baker provides the most detailed analysis of these provisions. See Dennis J. Baker, Glanville Williams: Textbook of Criminal Law, (London: Sweet & Maxwell, 2015) at Chapter 20. In a recent article, Baker "tries to identify the limits of derivative liability and its alternatives. In this article, I provide a doctrinal and theoretical analysis of the new independent direct liability offenses found in section 44-46 of Britain’s Serious Crime Act 2007 to highlight how independent offenses punishing acts of assistance and encouragement are fairer than making accessories and perpetrators equally liable under the law of complicity. I also examine the conduct element for these offenses to determine whether it is apt for catching the sort of reckless encouragement that is often present in the joint enterprise (common purpose) complicity cases and conclude that it is. The main shortfall of the offenses found in the Serious Crime Act 2007 is that they do not cover reckless participation. I conclude that section 44 covers only intentional (inchoate) participation and that section 45 covers only oblique intentional (inchoate) participation. It is submitted that section 45 of the Act of 2007 should be supplemented with a section 45A offense criminalizing reckless (inchoate) participation. Section 45 is an independent offense that criminalizes personal wrongdoing and as it is not a form of derivative liability, but rather personal liability, it allows for fair labeling and proportionate punishment for the independent wrong involved in encouraging and assisting another to perpetrate a crime. Therefore, a variant of the section 45 offense with recklessness as its mental element would also allow for fair labeling and proportionate punishment." See Dennis J. Baker, "Conceptualizing Inchoate Complicity: The Normative and Doctrinal Case for Lessor Offenses as an Alternative to Complicity Liability," (2016) Southern California Interdisciplinary Law Journal, Vol. 25, No. 1.Available at SSRN: http://ssrn.com/abstract=2687398

=== Encouraging or assisting offences believing one or more will be committed ===
Section 46 creates the crime of:

- Doing an act capable of encouraging or assisting the commission of one or more of a number of offences; and
- Believing that:
  - One or more of those offences will be committed, but having no belief as to which; and
  - His act will encourage or assist the commission of one or more of them.

The offence is triable on indictment (s.55(2)) and, on conviction, a person can be sentenced to the maximum penalty of those applying to the anticipated offences (s.58).

=== Defences ===
It is a defence that a person acted reasonably, based on his knowledge or belief, considering the seriousness of the anticipated offence and the purpose and authority with which he acted (s.50). The burden of proof of such facts is on the defendant on the balance of probabilities.

Where an offence exists to protect a certain class of persons, such a person does not commit an offence under ss.44-46 if the anticipated offence would have been committed against him (s.51).

== Disclosure and sharing of information to prevent fraud ==
These provisions began to come into force as of 1 March 2008 and affect various parts of the United Kingdom (s.93).

Section 68 authorises the disclosure by public bodies of information for the purposes of preventing fraud to any anti-fraud organisation, defined as "any unincorporated association, body corporate or other person which enables or facilitates any sharing of information to prevent fraud or a particular kind of fraud or which has any of these functions as its purpose or one of its purposes". Such disclosure must not contravene the Data Protection Act 1998 or the Regulation of Investigatory Powers Act 2000 and must be subject to a defined Code of Practice (s.71).

It is a crime for a person to make further unauthorised disclosure of such information (s.69). On summary conviction, an offender can be sentenced to up to 12 months' imprisonment and a fine of up to level 5 on the standard scale. On indictment in the Crown Court, an offender can be sentenced to up to two years' imprisonment and an unlimited fine (s.70).

Section 73 and Schedule 7 authorise certain bodies to conduct data matching exercises for the purpose of preventing or detecting fraud. Data matching is described in the Act as any "exercise involving the comparison of sets of data to determine how far they match (including the identification of any patterns and trends)". The authorised bodies are:

- Audit Commission
- Auditor General for Wales
- Comptroller and Auditor General for Northern Ireland

These provisions put on a statutory basis the National Fraud Initiative that has been operated for some years by the same authorised bodies and by Audit Scotland.

== Proceeds of crime ==
As of 1 March 2008, the transfer of the Director and staff of the Assets Recovery Agency, its property, rights and liabilities to the Serious Organised Crime Agency and the National Policing Improvement Agency started in anticipation of the Agency's abolition (s.74/ Schs.8-9). The Agency ceased to exist on 1 April 2008. Sections 75 to 81 make various amendments to the Proceeds of Crime Act 2002.

== Territorial extent and devolved matters ==
The provisions largely apply to England and Wales, and Northern Ireland but some provisions, as to disclosure and sharing of information and proceeds of crime, apply in Scotland. These provisions fall under the Sewel convention which demands the consent of the Scottish Parliament for Westminster to legislate on devolved issues. Such consent was granted.

== Bibliography ==
- Fortson, R. (2008). Blackstone's Guide to the Serious Crime Act 2007. Oxford: Oxford University Press. ISBN 978-0-19-954304-5.
- Office of Public Sector Information (2007) Explanatory Note to Serious Crime Act 2007, TSO
