= Moral certainty =

Concept of intuitive probability

Moral certainty is a concept of intuitive probability. It means a very high degree of probability, sufficient for action, but short of absolute or mathematical certainty.

== Origins ==
The notion of different degrees of certainty can be traced back to a statement in Aristotle's Nicomachean Ethics that one must be content with the kind of certainty appropriate to different subject matters, so that in practical decisions one cannot expect the certainty of mathematics.

The Latin phrase moralis certitudo was first used by the French philosopher Jean Gerson about 1400, to provide a basis for moral action that could (if necessary) be less exact than Aristotelian practical knowledge, thus avoiding the dangers of philosophical scepticism and opening the way for a benevolent casuistry.

The Oxford English Dictionary mentions occurrences in English from 1637.

== Law ==
In law, moral (or "virtual") certainty has been associated with verdicts based on certainty beyond a reasonable doubt.

Legal debate about instructions to seek a moral certainty has turned on the changing definitions of the phrase over time. Whereas it can be understood as an equivalent to "beyond reasonable doubt", in another sense, moral certainty refers to a firm conviction which does not correlate but rather opposes evidentiary certainty: i.e. one may have a firm subjective gut feeling of guilt – a feeling of moral certainty – without the evidence necessarily justifying a guilty conviction.

== See also ==
- Argument from ignorance
- Precautionary principle
- The dictionary definition of benefit of the doubt at Wiktionary
