= Conspiracy to defraud =

Offence under English common law

Conspiracy to defraud is an offence under the common law of England and Wales and Northern Ireland.

== England and Wales ==
The standard definition of a conspiracy to defraud was provided by Lord Dilhorne in Scott v Metropolitan Police Commissioner, when he said that:

it is clearly the law that an agreement by two or more by dishonesty to deprive a person of something which is his or to which he is or would be entitled and an agreement by two or more by dishonesty to injure some proprietary right of his, suffices to constitute the offence of conspiracy to defraud.

Conspiracy to defraud therefore contains two key elements; that the conspiracy involved dishonesty, and that if the conspiracy was undertaken, the victim's property rights would be harmed. This does not require the defendants' actions to directly result in the fraud; in R v Hollinshead, the House of Lords held that producing devices designed to alter electricity meter readings constituted conspiracy to defraud, even though the actual fraud would be carried out by members of the public rather than the conspirators. It's not necessary for the actions to directly lead to any kind of financial loss for the victim in two situations; when the conspirators plan to deceive a person holding public office into acting counter to their duties, and when the conspirators know that their actions put the victim's property at risk, even if the risk never materializes.

The following cases also provide precedence:

- R v Orbell (1703) 6 Mod Rep 42, (1703) 12 Mod Rep 499
- R v Button (1848) 11 QB 929, (1848) 18 LJMC 19, (1848) 12 LT (OS) 309, (1848) 13 JP 20, (1848) 12 Jur 1017, (1848) 3 Cox 229
- R v Yates (1853) 6 Cox 441
- R v De Kromme (1892) 66 LT 301, (1892) 56 JP 683, (1892) 8 TLR 325, (1892) 17 Cox 492
- R v Quinn (1898) 19 Cox 78
- R v Boyle and Mears, 94 Cr App R 158, CA

Although most frauds are crimes, in conspiracy to defraud cases it is irrelevant whether the agreement would amount to a crime if carried out. If the victim has suffered any financial loss or other prejudice, there is no need to establish that the defendant deceived him or her and conspiracy charges are unnecessary. But, following Scott v Metropolitan Police Commissioner (1974) 3 All ER 1032, it is necessary to prove that the victim was dishonestly deceived by one or more of the parties into running an economic risk that he or she would not otherwise have run, if the victim has not suffered any loss. For the mens rea, it is necessary to prove that "the purpose of the conspirators (was) to cause the victim economic loss" (per Lord Diplock in Scott). For the test of dishonesty, see R v Ghosh (1982) 2 All ER 689.

=== Relationship to statutory conspiracy ===
Section 32(1)(a) of the Theft Act 1968 did not, by abolishing the common law offence of cheating, abolish the common law offence of conspiracy to defraud.

Section 5(1) of the Criminal Law Act 1977 does not affect the common law offence of conspiracy so far as it relates to conspiracy to defraud.

Section 12(1) of the Criminal Justice Act 1987 provides that:

If—

- (a) a person agrees with any other person or persons that a course of conduct shall be pursued; and
- (b) that course of conduct will necessarily amount to or involve the commission of any offence or offences by one or more of the parties to the agreement if the agreement is carried out in accordance with their intentions,

the fact that it will do so shall not preclude a charge of conspiracy to defraud being brought against any of them in respect of the agreement.

Paragraphs (a) and (b) are derived from section 1(1) of the Criminal Law Act 1977 and refer to the offence that that section creates.

Before 20 July 1987, section 1 of the Criminal Law Act 1977 did not apply in any case where the agreement in question amounted to a conspiracy to defraud at common law.

For Incitement to conspire, see section 5(7) of the Criminal Law Act 1977.

=== Indictment ===
For Indictment, see the following cases for precedent:

- R v Landy and others [1981] 1 WLR 355, 72 Cr App R 237, [1981] 1 All ER 1172, [1981] Crim LR 326, CA
- R v Cohen and others, The Independent, 29 July 1992, CA

==== History ====
The following specimen count was formerly contained in paragraph 13 of the Second Schedule to the Indictments Act 1915 before it was repealed.

STATEMENT OF OFFENCE.

Conspiracy to defraud.

PARTICULARS OF OFFENCE.

A.B. and C.D. on the day of and on divers days between that day and the day of , in the county of , conspired together with intent to defraud by means of an advertisement inserted by them, the said A.B. and C.D., in the H.S. newspaper, falsely representing that A.B. and C.D. were then carrying on a genuine business as jewellers at in the county of , and that they were then able to supply certain articles of jewellery to whomsoever would remit to them the sum of two pounds.

=== Mode of trial and sentence ===
A person guilty of conspiracy to defraud is liable on conviction to imprisonment for any term not exceeding ten years, or to a fine, or to both.

=== Jurisdiction ===
Conspiracy to defraud is a Group B offence for the purposes of Part I of the Criminal Justice Act 1993.

See the following cases for precedent:

- Attorney General's Reference (No 1 of 1982) [1983] QB 751, [1983] 3 WLR 72, [1983] 2 All ER 721, [1983] Crim LR 534
- DPP v Doot and others [1973] AC 807, [1973] 2 WLR 532, [1973] 1 All ER 940, 57 Cr App R 600, [1973] Crim LR 292, HL
- Board of Trade v Owen [1957] AC 602, [1957] 2 WLR 351, [1957] 1 All ER 411, 41 Cr App R 11, affirming R v Owen [1957] 1 QB 174

== Northern Ireland ==
Article 13(1) of the Criminal Attempts and Conspiracy (Northern Ireland) Order 1983 (S.I. 1983/1120 (N.I. 13)) does not affect the common law offence of conspiracy so far as it relates to conspiracy to defraud.

See article 11 of the Criminal Justice (Serious Fraud) (Northern Ireland) Order 1988 (S.I. 1988/1846 (N.I. 16))

== See also ==
- Conspiracy (criminal)
