= Cheating (law) =

Criminal offense in common law

At law, cheating is a specific criminal offence relating to property.

Historically, to cheat was to commit a misdemeanour at common law (called "summary offense" in some jurisdictions). However, in most jurisdictions, the offence has now been codified into statute.

In most cases the codified statutory form of cheating and the original common law offence are very similar, but there can be differences. For example, under English law it was held in R v Sinclair that "[t]o cheat and defraud is to act with deliberate dishonesty to the prejudice of another person's proprietary right." However, at common law a great deal of authority suggested that there had to be contrivance, such that the public were likely to be deceived and that "common prudence and caution are not sufficient security against a person being defrauded thereby".

Examples of cheating upheld by the courts have included fraudulently pretending to have power to discharge a soldier, using false weights or measures, and playing with false dice.

== Definition ==
In relation to the common law offence, no judicial definition of the offence was ever laid down, but the description of the offence set down in Stephen's Criminal Digest is regarded as fairly comprehensive, and is cited as an authoritative definition by Stroud's Judicial Dictionary.

Every one commits the misdemeanour called cheating who fraudulently obtains the property of another by any deceitful practice not amounting to felony, which practice is of such a nature that it directly affects, or may directly affect, the public at large. But it is not cheating, within the meaning of this article, to deceive any person in any contract or private dealing by lies, unaccompanied by such practices as aforesaid.

== Other statutory uses ==
A number of jurisdictions also have statutory offences relating to cheating in gambling. See for example section 42(3) of the Gambling Act 2005.

== England and Wales ==
The common law offence of cheating was abolished, except as regards offences relating to the public revenue, by section 32(1)(a) of the Theft Act 1968.

=== Cheating the public revenue ===
William Harkins said that "all frauds affecting the Crown and public at large are indictable as cheats at common law". This passage was cited in R v Mulligan.

Prosecutions under the common law are still pursued in England and can result in heavy sentences – significantly in excess of the maximum available to the courts for corresponding statutory offences.

The following cases are also relevant:

- R v Hudson
- R v Mavji
- R v Redford
- R v Hunt

==== Sentence ====
See R v Regan, Attorney General's References (Nos. 88, 89, 90 and 91 of 2006), and R v Meehan and others.

=== Cheating at play ===
This offence was formally created by section 17 of the Gaming Act 1845. The current English legislation on cheating in betting is found in s. 42 Gambling Act 2005.

=== Going equipped for cheat ===
In section 25 of the Theft Act 1968, the word "cheat" meant an offence under section 15 of that Act. The said section 15 created the offence of obtaining property by deception. The Fraud Act 2006 replaced these offences with new ones using different terminology.
