= Principal (criminal law) =

Actor primarily responsible for a crime

Under criminal law, a principal is any actor who is primarily responsible for a criminal offense. Such an actor is distinguished from others who may also be subject to criminal liability as accomplices, accessories or conspirators. In both German and Turkish penal codes, "principal" is one of the three types of perpetration prescribed by law.

Some jurisdictions refer to a principal as defined above as a principal in the first degree. Such jurisdictions use the term principal in the second degree to mean someone who is present at the scene of the crime and who aids, abets, or encourages the commission of the crime with the required criminal intent.

== See also ==
- Principal (commercial law)
