= Accessory (legal term) =

Person who assists in the commission of a crime

An accessory is a person who assists, but does not actually participate, in the commission of a crime. The distinction between an accessory and a principal is a question of fact and degree:

- The principal is the one whose acts or omissions, accompanied by the relevant mens rea (Latin for "guilty mind"), are the most immediate cause of the actus reus (Latin for "guilty act").
- If two or more people are directly responsible for the actus reus, they can be charged as joint principals. The test to distinguish a joint principal from an accessory is whether the defendant independently contributed to causing the actus reus rather than merely giving generalised and/or limited help and encouragement.

== Elements ==
In some jurisdictions, an accessory is distinguished from an accomplice, who normally is present at the crime and participates in some way. An accessory must generally have knowledge that a crime is being committed, will be committed, or has been committed. A person with such knowledge may become an accessory by helping or encouraging the criminal in some way. The assistance to the criminal may be of any type, including emotional or financial assistance as well as physical assistance or concealment.

=== Relative severity of penalties ===
The punishment tariff for accessories varies in different jurisdictions and has varied at different periods of history. In some times and places accessories have been subject to lesser penalties than principals (the persons who actually commit the crime). In others accessories are considered the same as principals in theory, although in a particular case an accessory may be treated less severely than a principal. In some times and places accessories before the fact (i.e., with knowledge of the crime before it is committed) have been treated differently from accessories after the fact (e.g., those who aid a principal after a crime has been committed but had no role in the crime itself). Common law traditionally considers an accessory just as guilty as the principal(s) in a crime, and subject to the same penalties. Separate and lesser punishments exist by statute in many jurisdictions.

=== Conspiracy ===
In some situations, a charge of conspiracy can be made even if the primary offense is never committed, so long as the plan has been made, and at least one overt act towards the crime has been committed by at least one of the conspirators. For example, if a group plans on forging bank checks, and forges the checks but ultimately does not attempt to cash the checks, the group might still be charged with conspiracy due to the overt act of forgery. Thus, an accessory before the fact will often, but not always, also be considered a conspirator. A conspirator must have been a party to the planning of the crime, rather than merely becoming aware of the plan to commit it and then helping in some way.

A person who incites another to a crime will become a part of a conspiracy if agreement is reached and may then be considered an accessory or a joint principal if the crime is eventually committed.

In the United States, a person who learns of the crime and gives some form of assistance before the crime is committed is known as an "accessory before the fact." A person who learns of the crime after it is committed and helps the criminal to conceal it, or aids the criminal in escaping, or simply fails to report the crime, is known as an "accessory after the fact." A person who does both is sometimes referred to as an "accessory before and after the fact," but this usage is less common.

=== Criminal facilitation ===
In some jurisdictions, criminal "facilitation" laws do not require that the primary crime be actually committed as a prerequisite for criminal liability. These include state statutes making it a crime to "provide" a person with "means or opportunity" to commit a crime, "believing it probable that he/she is rendering aid to a person who intends to commit a crime."

=== Knowledge of the crime ===
To be convicted of an accessory charge, the accused must generally be proved to have had actual knowledge that a crime was going to be, or had been, committed. Furthermore, there must be proof that the accessory knew that his or her action, or inaction, was helping the criminals commit the crime, or evade detection, or escape. A person who unknowingly houses a person who has just committed a crime, for instance, may not be convicted of being an accessory offense because they did not have knowledge of the crime.

=== Exceptions ===
In many jurisdictions a person may not be charged as an accessory to a crime committed by one's spouse. This is related to the traditional privilege not to testify against an accused spouse, and the older idea that a wife was completely subject to the orders of a husband, whether lawful or illegal.

In most jurisdictions an accessory cannot be tried before the principal is convicted, unless the accessory and principal are tried together, or unless the accessory consents to being tried first.

== Usage ==
The term "accessory" derives from the English common law and has been inherited by those countries with a more or less Anglo-American legal system. The concept of complicity is, of course, common across different legal traditions. The specific terms accessory-before-the-fact and accessory-after-the-fact were used in England and the United States but are now more common in historical than in current usage.

The spelling accessary is occasionally used, but only in this legal sense.

== History ==
The English legal authority William Blackstone, in his Commentaries, defined an accessory as:

II. AN accessory is he who is not the chief actor in the offense, nor present at its performance, but is someway concerned therein, either before or after the fact committed.

— Book 4 chapter 3

He goes on to define an accessory-before-the-fact in these words:

As to the second point, who may be an accessory before the fact; Sir Matthew Hale 12 defines him to be one, who being absent at the time of the crime committed, does yet procure, counsel, or command another to commit a crime. Herein absence is necessary to make him an accessory; for such procusence is necessary to make him an accessory; for if such procurer, or the like, be present, he is guilty of the crime as principal.

and an accessory-after-the-fact as follows:

An accessory after the fact may be, where a person, knowing a felony to have been committed, receives, relieves, comforts, or assists the felon. Therefore, to make an accessory ex post facto, it is in the first place requisite that he knows of the felony committed.18 In the next place, he must receive, relieve, comfort, or assist him. And, generally, any assistance whatever given to a felon, to hinder his being apprehended, tried, or suffering punishment, makes the assistor an accessory. As furnishing him with a horse to escape his pursuers, money or victuals to support him, a house or other shelter to conceal him, or open force and violence to rescue or protect him.

== Specific laws ==
=== Canada ===
The Criminal Code has several sections which deal with accessory to offences:

- 21. (1) Every one is a party to an offence who
  - (a) actually commits it;
  - (b) does or omits to do anything for the purpose of aiding any person to commit it; or
  - (c) abets any person in committing it.
- (2) Where two or more persons form an intention in common to carry out an unlawful purpose and to assist each other therein and any one of them, in carrying out the common purpose, commits an offence, each of them who knew or ought to have known that the commission of the offence would be a probable consequence of carrying out the common purpose is a party to that offence.
- 23. (1) An accessory after the fact to an offence is one who, knowing that a person has been a party to the offence, receives, comforts or assists that person for the purpose of enabling that person to escape.

For these purposes, abetting means "to encourage or set on" and an abettor is "an instigator or setter on, one who promotes or procures a crime to be committed".

Note that under s. 21(2), the words "ought to have known" indicating objective knowledge have been ruled unconstitutional by the Supreme Court of Canada in cases where the principal offence requires subjective foresight of the consequences, such as murder (R v Logan, [1990] 2 SCR 731).

=== France ===
Article 121-6 of the French criminal code states that "the accomplice to the offence, in the meaning of article 121-7, is punishable as a perpetrator". Article 121-7 distinguishes, in its two paragraphs, complicity by aiding or abetting and complicity by instigation.

=== Norway ===
Each penal provision in the Norwegian criminal code specifies if it is criminal to aid and abet. Further, when the attempt is criminal, participating in that attempt is criminal.

=== England and Wales ===
The law governing complicity in criminal offences originally arose from the common law, but was codified in section 8 of the Accessories and Abettors Act 1861 (as amended by s.65(4) Criminal Law Act 1977), which states:

Whosoever shall aid, abet, counsel, or procure the commission of any indictable offence, whether the same be an offence at common law or by virtue of any Act passed or to be passed, shall be liable to be tried, indicted, and punished as a principal offender.

==== The significance of presence ====
Mere presence at the scene of a crime is not enough, even where the defendant remains at the scene to watch the crime being committed. In R v Coney (1882) 8 QBD 534, where a crowd watched an illegal prize fight, it was held that there must be active, not mere passive, encouragement. Hence, even though the fight would not have taken place without spectators prepared to bet on the outcome, the spectators were acquitted because their presence was accidental. It would have been different if they had attended at the scene of a crime by prior agreement because their mere presence would be an encouragement. Similarly, in R v J. F. Alford Transport Ltd (1997) 2 Cr. App. R. 326 it was held a reasonable inference that a company, knowing that its employees are acting illegally and deliberately doing nothing to prevent it from being repeated, actually intends to encourage the repetition. This will be a natural inference in any situation where the alleged accessory has the right to control what the principal is doing.

==== Mens rea ====
A mens rea is required even when it is not required for the principal offender (for example, when the principal commits a strict liability offence). The defendant must intend to do the acts which he knows will assist or encourage the principal to commit a crime of a certain type. In R v Bainbridge (1960) 1 QB 129 the defendant supplied cutting equipment not knowing exactly what crime was going to be committed but was convicted because the equipment supplied was not used in the ordinary way, but for a criminal purpose instead. The accomplice must also know of all the essential matters that make the act a crime, but need not know that the act would amount to a crime because ignorance of the law is no excuse. In National Coal Board v Gamble (1959) 1 QB 11 the operator of a weighbridge was indifferent as to whether the principal committed the offence which is generally not a sufficient mens rea, but the NCB was convicted because the act of the employee was an act of sale (see vicarious liability).

Gillick v West Norfolk and Wisbech Area Health Authority (1986) AC 112 is an example of a type of case where the uncertainties of the precise meaning of intention effectively confer a sometimes-welcome discretion on whether to impose responsibility. That case concerned the question of whether a doctor giving contraceptive advice or treatment to a girl under the age of 16 could be liable as an accessory to a subsequent offence of unlawful sexual intercourse committed by the girl's sexual partner. The Lords held that generally this would not be the case (the action was a civil one for a declaration) since the doctor would lack the necessary intention (even though he realised that his actions would facilitate the intercourse). One rationale for the decision would be that a jury would not infer intention in such circumstances if they thought that the doctor was acting in what he considered to be the girl's best interests.

=== Scotland ===
In Scotland, under section 293 of the Criminal Procedure (Scotland) Act 1995, a person may be convicted of, and punished for, a contravention of any enactment, notwithstanding that he was guilty of such contravention as art and part only.

=== United States ===
U.S. jurisdictions (that is, the federal government and the various state governments) have come to treat accessories before the fact differently from accessories after the fact. All U.S. jurisdictions have effectively eliminated the distinction between accessories before the fact and principals, either by doing away with the category of "accessory before the fact" entirely or by providing that accessories before the fact are guilty of the same offense as principals. Also, some jurisdictions have merged being an accessory before the fact with aiding and abetting.

The Model Penal Code's definition of accomplice liability includes those who at common law were called accessories before the fact; under the Model Penal Code, accomplices face the same liability as principals. It is now possible to be convicted as an accessory before the fact even though the principal has not been convicted or (in most jurisdictions) even if the principal was acquitted at an earlier trial.

However, modern U.S. jurisdictions punish accessories after the fact for a separate criminal offense distinct from the underlying crime and having a different (and less severe) punishment. Some states still use the term "accessory after the fact"; others no longer use the term, but have comparable laws against hindering apprehension or prosecution, obstruction of justice, tampering with evidence, harboring a felon, or the like. Such crimes usually require proving (1) an intent to hinder apprehension or prosecution and (2) actual aid in the form of either (a) harboring the criminal, (b) providing specified means (such as a disguise) to evade arrest, (c) tampering with evidence, (d) warning the criminal of impending arrest, or (e) using force or deception to prevent the arrest.

Federal law has followed both these trends. The U.S. Code effectively treats as principals those who would traditionally have been considered accessories before the fact at common law:

- (a) Whoever aids, abets, counsels, commands, induces or procures the commission of an offense, is punishable as a principal.
- (b) Whoever willfully causes an act to be done which if directly performed by him or another would be an offense, is punishable as a principal.

However, federal law treats accessories after the fact differently from principals. Accessories after the fact face a maximum of only half the fine and half the prison time that principals face. (If the principal faces the death penalty or life imprisonment, accessories after the fact face up to 15 years' imprisonment.) Federal law defines accessories after the fact as persons who provide criminals with certain aid in order to hinder a criminal's apprehension or prosecution:

Whoever, knowing that an offense against the United States has been committed, receives, relieves, comforts or assists the offender in order to hinder or prevent his apprehension, trial or punishment, is an accessory after the fact.

== See also ==
- Accomplice
