= List of schools in the London Borough of Southwark =

This is a list of schools in the London Borough of Southwark, England.

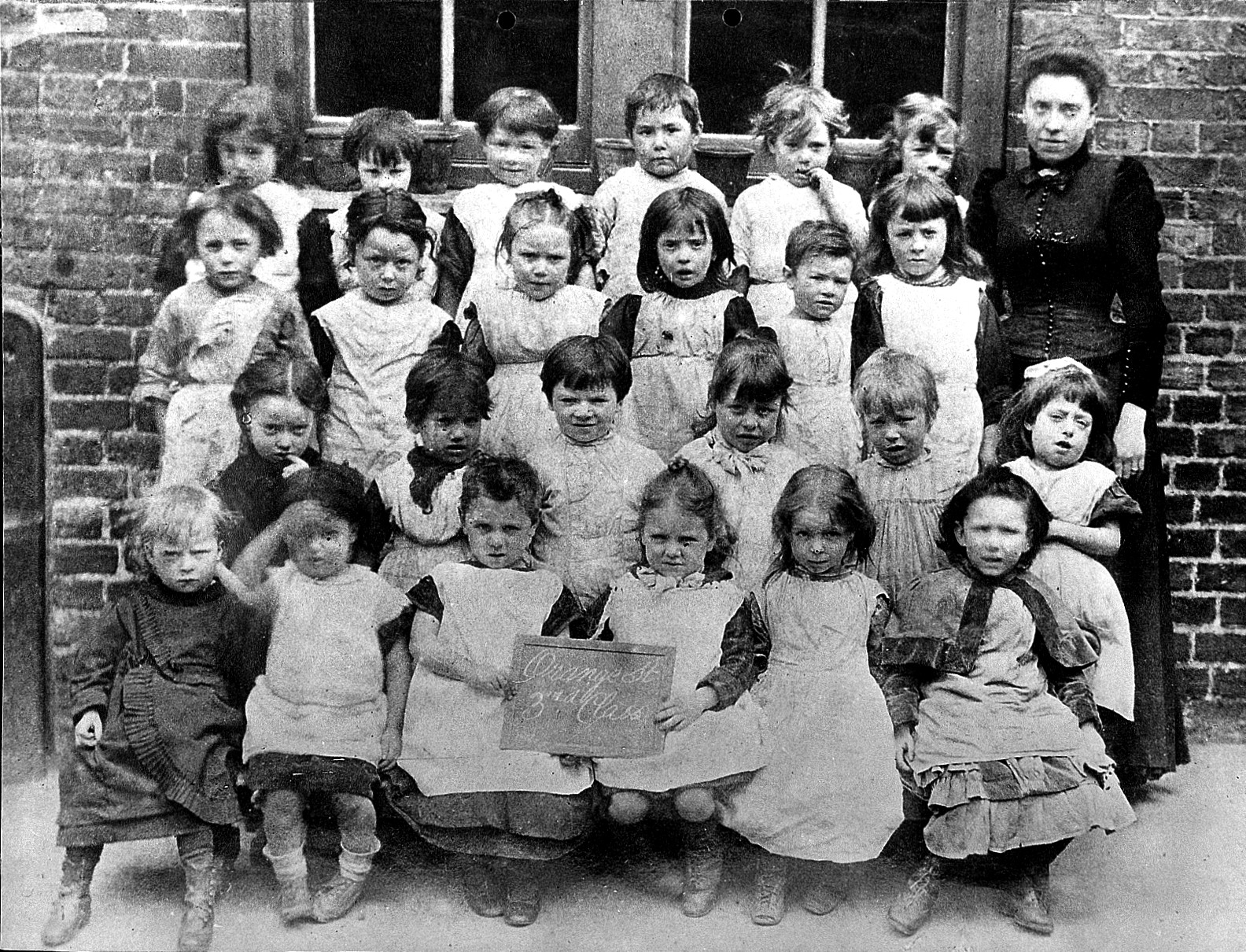
Scholars of Snowsfield School, Bermondsey, 1894

== State-funded schools ==
=== Primary schools ===
- Albion Primary School
- Alfred Salter Primary School
- Angel Oak Academy
- Ark Globe Academy
- The Belham Primary School
- Bellenden Primary School
- Bessemer Grange Primary School
- Boutcher CE Primary School
- Brunswick Park Primary School
- Camelot Primary School
- The Cathedral School of St Saviour and St Mary Overie
- Charles Dickens Primary School
- Charlotte Sharman Primary School
- Comber Grove School
- Crampton Primary School
- Crawford Primary School
- Dog Kennel Hill School
- Dulwich Hamlet Junior School
- Dulwich Village CE Infants' School
- Dulwich Wood Primary School
- English Martyrs RC Primary School
- Friars Primary Foundation School
- Galleywall Primary School
- Goodrich Community Primary School
- Goose Green Primary School
- Grange Primary School
- Harris Primary Academy East Dulwich
- Harris Primary Academy Peckham Park * Peckham
- Harris Primary Free School Peckham * Peckham
- Heber Primary School
- Hollydale Primary School
- Ilderton Primary School
- Ivydale Primary School
- John Donne Primary School
- John Keats Primary School
- John Ruskin Primary School
- Judith Kerr Primary School
- Keyworth Primary School
- Lyndhurst Primary School
- Michael Faraday School
- Oliver Goldsmith Primary School
- Peter Hills with St Mary's and St Paul's CE Primary School
- Phoenix Primary School
- Pilgrim's Way Primary School
- Redriff Primary School
- Riverside Primary School
- Robert Browning Primary School
- Rotherhithe Primary school
- Rye Oak Primary School
- St Anthony's RC Primary School
- St Francis RC Primary School
- St George's Cathedral RC Primary School
- St George's CE Primary School
- St James' CE Primary School
- St James the Great RC Primary School
- St John's and St Clement's CE Primary School
- St John's RC Primary School
- St Joseph's RC Infant'’ School
- St Joseph's RC Junior School
- St Joseph's RC Primary School, George Row
- St Joseph's RC Primary School, Gomm Road
- St Joseph's RC Primary School, The Borough
- St Jude's CE Primary School
- St Mary Magdalene CE Primary School
- St Paul's CE Primary School
- St Peter's CE Primary School
- Snowsfields Primary School
- Southwark Park School
- Surrey Square Primary School
- Tower Bridge Primary School
- Victory Primary School

=== Secondary schools ===
- Ark All Saints Academy
- Ark Globe Academy
- Ark Walworth Academy
- Bacon's College
- The Charter School East Dulwich
- The Charter School North Dulwich
- City of London Academy, Southwark
- Compass School Southwark
- Haberdashers' Aske's Borough Academy
- Harris Academy Bermondsey
- Harris Academy Peckham
- Harris Boys' Academy East Dulwich
- Harris Girls' Academy East Dulwich
- Kingsdale Foundation School
- Notre Dame Roman Catholic Girls' School
- Sacred Heart Catholic School
- St Michael's Catholic College
- St Saviour's and St Olave's Church of England School
- St Thomas the Apostle College
- University Academy of Engineering South Bank

=== Special and alternative schools ===
- Beormund Primary School
- Bethlem and Maudsley Hospital School
- Cherry Garden School
- Evelina Hospital School
- Haymerle School
- Highshore School
- Newlands Academy
- Southwark Inclusive Learning Service
- Spa School Bermondsey
- Spa School Camberwell
- Tuke School

=== Further education ===
- Lewisham Southwark College

== Independent schools ==
=== Primary and preparatory schools ===
- Dulwich Prep London
- Herne Hill School
- Imperial Oak Preparatory School
- London Christian School
- The Villa

=== Senior and all-through schools ===
- Alleyn's School
- Dulwich College
- James Allen's Girls' School

=== Special and alternative schools ===
- Arco Academy
- Cavendish School
- From Boyhood To Manhood Foundation
- The Bridge SEN School
- PhoenixPlace
- Treasure House London CIC

== See also ==
- Southwark Schools' Learning Partnership
