= 2 Hare Court =

British law firms established in 1567

Coordinates: 51.513165°N 0.111235°W

- Headquarters: City of London, EC4; United Kingdom
- Offices: London, United Kingdom
- No. of lawyers: 77 practitioners
- Major practice areas: Crime, regulatory
- Key people: Jonathan Laidlaw KC
- Date founded: 1567
- Company type: Professional limited liability partnership
- Website: 2HareCourt.com

2 Hare Court is a barristers' chambers specialising in criminal and regulatory law, located in the Inner Temple, one of the four Inns of Court. Established in 1967, it employs 77 barristers, including 23 King's Counsel and several former prosecutors. These include individuals who have acted as First Senior, Senior, and Junior Treasury Counsel – barristers appointed by the Attorney General to prosecute serious and complex criminal cases.

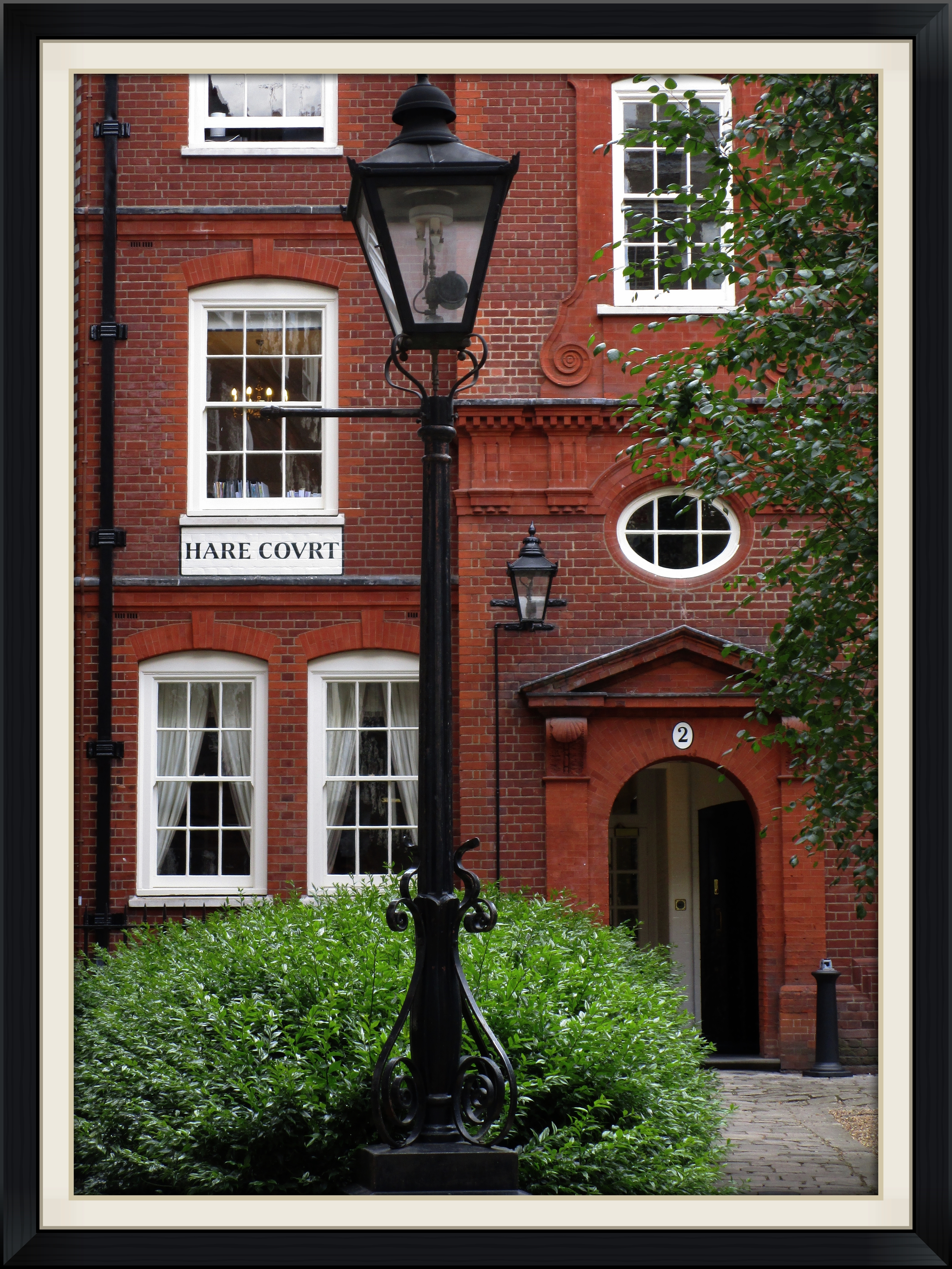
2 Hare Court building, located in the Inner Temple.

== History ==
2 Hare Court is a Grade II listed building that houses barristers' chambers in the Inner Temple. It was named after Nicholas Hare, a nephew of Sir Nicholas Hare, who built the first set in 1567. The original buildings were destroyed by fire in 1678, and the present 1 Hare Court building dates from the reconstruction. In 2000, the 2 Hare Court building was refurbished.

== Practice areas ==
The set's practice areas include:

- Business Crime
- Criminal defence
- Regulatory law
- Fraud
- Health and Safety
- Inquests & Public Inquiries
- Licensing
- Professional Discipline
- Private Prosecution
- Public Prosecution
- Sport
- Tax

== Notable members ==
Members of chambers have prosecuted and defended in many high-profile criminal cases, including those involving murder and terrorism. Head of Chambers Jonathan Laidlaw KC defended former News International chief executive Rebekah Brooks against phone-hacking charges, while Oliver Glasgow KC prosecuted Constance Briscoe, a barrister and part-time judge, who was imprisoned for perverting the course of justice in the Chris Huhne scandal. Other members include financial crime specialist Robert Rinder, who is also known for his television work, and Orlando Pownall KC, who represented the Premier League footballer Adam Johnson at a trial over child sex allegations.

=== Former notable members ===
Former members include The Hon. Mr Justice Edis, who practised in chambers until 2013 when he was appointed a Justice of the High Court, and Dame Bobbie Cheema-Grubb, former member who practised in chambers until November 2015, when she was appointed a High Court judge.

== See also ==
- Criminal justice
- Criminal defence
