= Oliver Glasgow =

British barrister

Oliver Glasgow KC

Junior Treasury Counsel
- In office January 2009 – September 2015

Senior Treasury Counsel
- In office September 2015 – December 2020

First Senior Treasury Counsel
- In office January 2021 – December 2023

Personal details
- Born: Oliver Edwin James Glasgow; 1972 (age 53–54)
- Parent: Edwin Glasgow KC
- Education: Oxford University MA (Oxon)
- Occupation: Senior Treasury Counsel, Trustee of The Kalisher Trust, barrister at 2 Hare Court
- Profession: Barrister
- Known for: Acting for the prosecution in serious criminal cases
- Website: www.2harecourt.com

Oliver Edwin James Glasgow KC (born 6 January 1972) is a barrister who specialises in criminal law. Since November 2015 he served as one of the Senior Treasury Counsel at the Old Bailey, prosecuting serious criminal cases. On 1 January 2021 he was appointed First Senior Treasury Counsel by the Attorney General, Suella Braverman KC being succeeded by Tom Little KC in January 2024.

== Early life ==
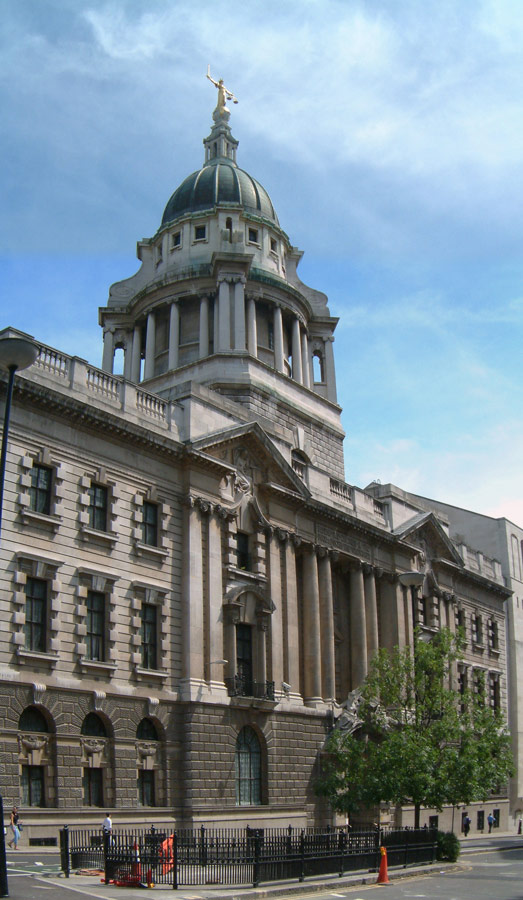
The Central Criminal Court, or Old Bailey, where Glasgow practised since 2009

The eldest son of Edwin Glasgow CBE QC (born 1945), Glasgow was educated at The University of Oxford, graduating with honours, MA (Oxon). He was called to the Bar from the Middle Temple in 1995 and practised as a barrister at the Central Criminal Court and on the South Eastern Circuit.

== Career at the Bar ==
Glasgow practises at 2 Hare Court, chambers of Jonathan Laidlaw QC, prosecuting major crime and prosecuting and defending in health and safety cases. In 2016 Glasgow was appointed Queen's Counsel.

== Notable cases ==
=== Defence ===
- In January 2017 Glasgow acted for the Ministry of Defence in a Court Martial review, advising MoD and the Security Services in the case of British Marine Alexander Blackman, who was convicted of murdering a wounded Taliban fighter in November 2013.
- In 2016 Glasgow represented Marie Stopes International, accused of gross negligence manslaughter of a patient who underwent surgical abortion. A doctor and two nurses from the charity were subsequently acquitted of killing a woman who bled to death after travelling from Ireland to the UK for an abortion, however Judge Nicholas Cooke QC demanded a review into what "went wrong".

=== Prosecution ===
- In 2017 Glasgow acted in the prosecution of Ismael Watson, a 27-year-old Liverpudlian formerly known as Jack, who tried to travel to Syria after being radicalised by jihadists online.

"There is no doubt that had he succeeded in his attempt to enter Syria he would have joined IS and that he would have fought for them. He eventually admitted that this had been his plan and he admitted that he wanted to fight in what he believes is a holy war against the western oppressors. He is described by his mother as "meek, mild and easily influenced", but following his conversion he grew increasingly distant from his immediate family. He started to watch IS videos and listening to lectures about jihad."

— Oliver Glasgow QC, Prosecutor.

Watson flew to Turkey in 2016 and tried to cross the border into war-torn Syria in February 2017. However, he was intercepted by the Turkish authorities and deported to the UK after vowing to carry out terrorist atrocities during encrypted chats with undercover MI5 agents.

- In 2015 Glasgow prosecuted Constance Briscoe, a barrister and part-time judge who was imprisoned for perverting the course of justice. Briscoe, a recorder and tribunal judge, lied to the police during the investigation into Pryce and Huhne and thereafter provided false documentation in order to deceive the officers who were investigating her conduct. She was imprisoned for 16 months in May after an Old Bailey jury found her guilty of perverting the course of justice. She was removed from the judiciary in August 2015 and released from prison in November 2016 after serving less than half her sentence, but has not undertaken any judicial duties since her arrest in October 2012. At the costs hearing, Glasgow told the judge, Mr Justice Baker, that the crown wanted £89,246.33 from Briscoe towards prosecution costs.
- In 2014 Glasgow prosecuted Cavendish Masonry, a stone masonry company which was charged with corporate manslaughter after one of its employees was crushed to death on a large estate in Oxfordshire. The stonemasons, Cavendish Masonry Ltd, were fined £237,000.

== Trusteeships ==
Glasgow is a trustee of The Kalisher Trust, a legal charity which aims to transform the lives of bright young people through the development of their advocacy skills and supports those who aspire to become criminal barristers. Glasgow is a trustee of NewWave in the Community, a sports charity which aims to transform the lives of vulnerable young people through the provision of sport and fitness coaching.

== See also ==
- R v Huhne and Pryce
- Constance Briscoe
- Joint enterprise
- Protection from Harassment Act 1997
- Health and Safety at Work etc. Act 1974
