= Jonathan Laidlaw =

British lawyer

Jonathan Laidlaw KC

Junior Treasury Counsel
- In office 1995–2000

Senior Treasury Counsel
- In office 2000–2008

First Treasury Counsel
- In office 2008–2010

Personal details
- Born: Jonathan James Laidlaw; 1960 (age 65–66)
- Education: University of Hull
- Occupation: Senior Treasury Counsel, barrister at 2 Hare Court
- Profession: Barrister
- Website: www.2harecourt.com

Jonathan Laidlaw KC (February 1960) is an English barrister notable for prosecuting and defending in many high-profile criminal cases, including defence of News International chief executive Rebekah Brooks who was acquitted of all charges after the phone hacking trial. In 2012 he was chosen by the Football Association to present their case against John Terry. On 31 May 2022, he applied to be admitted as a lawyer in Malaysia to serve as lead counsel for former Malaysian Prime Minister Najib Razak to appeal the latter's criminal convictions in Malaysia. The application was dismissed by the Malaysia High Court on July 21, 2022. He also unsuccessfully represented Andrew Pilley between 2022 and 2023 in his fraud trial. He graduated from the University of Hull with a law degree.

== Career at the Bar ==
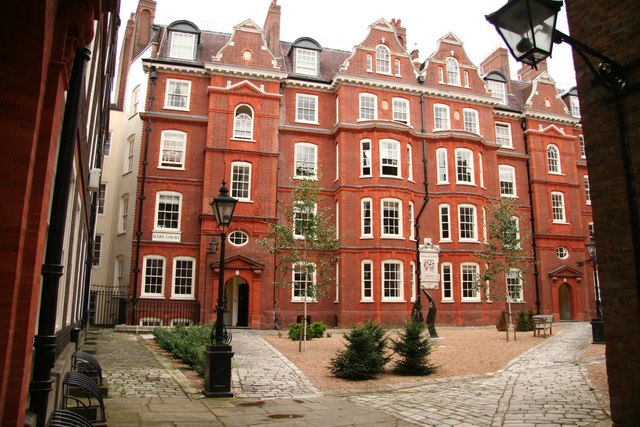
2 Hare Court chambers where in 2013 Laidlaw was appointed the head of chambers

Laidlaw was called to the Bar in 1982. He practises at 2 Hare Court in the Inner Temple, where in 2013 he was appointed the head of chambers. He sat as a Crown Court Recorder since 1998 and in 2008 was appointed Queen's Counsel.

Between 2022 and 2023 Laidlaw represented Andrew Pilley (founder of the BES Utilities fraud), after making a number of attempts to dismiss the criminal charges brought against him, the matter ultimately went to trial in Preston Crown Court between October 2022 and May 2023. Pilley was found guilty on 4 serious fraud charges and sentenced to 13 years prison. In his sentencing remarks, Laidlaw received admonishment from His Honour Judge Knowles KC for complaining on Pilley's behalf that his cell was too small, complaining of being "humiliated" and asking for him not to sit in the dock during the course of the trial.

== Treasury Counsel ==
As Treasury Counsel, Laidlaw brought Britain's first war crimes case and acted as prosecution in the trial of the Provisional IRA bombing of Canary Wharf, the Official Secrets Act prosecution of Richard Tomlinson and David Shayler, the Jill Dando murder trial, the trial of the Al Qaeda cell that planned pre-9/11 attacks in the United States and United Kingdom, the trial of the Al Qaeda attack on Glasgow Airport and of Delroy Grant who received four life sentences and is believed responsible for roughly 100 cases of rape, sexual assault and burglary.
