= Dulwich Community Hospital =

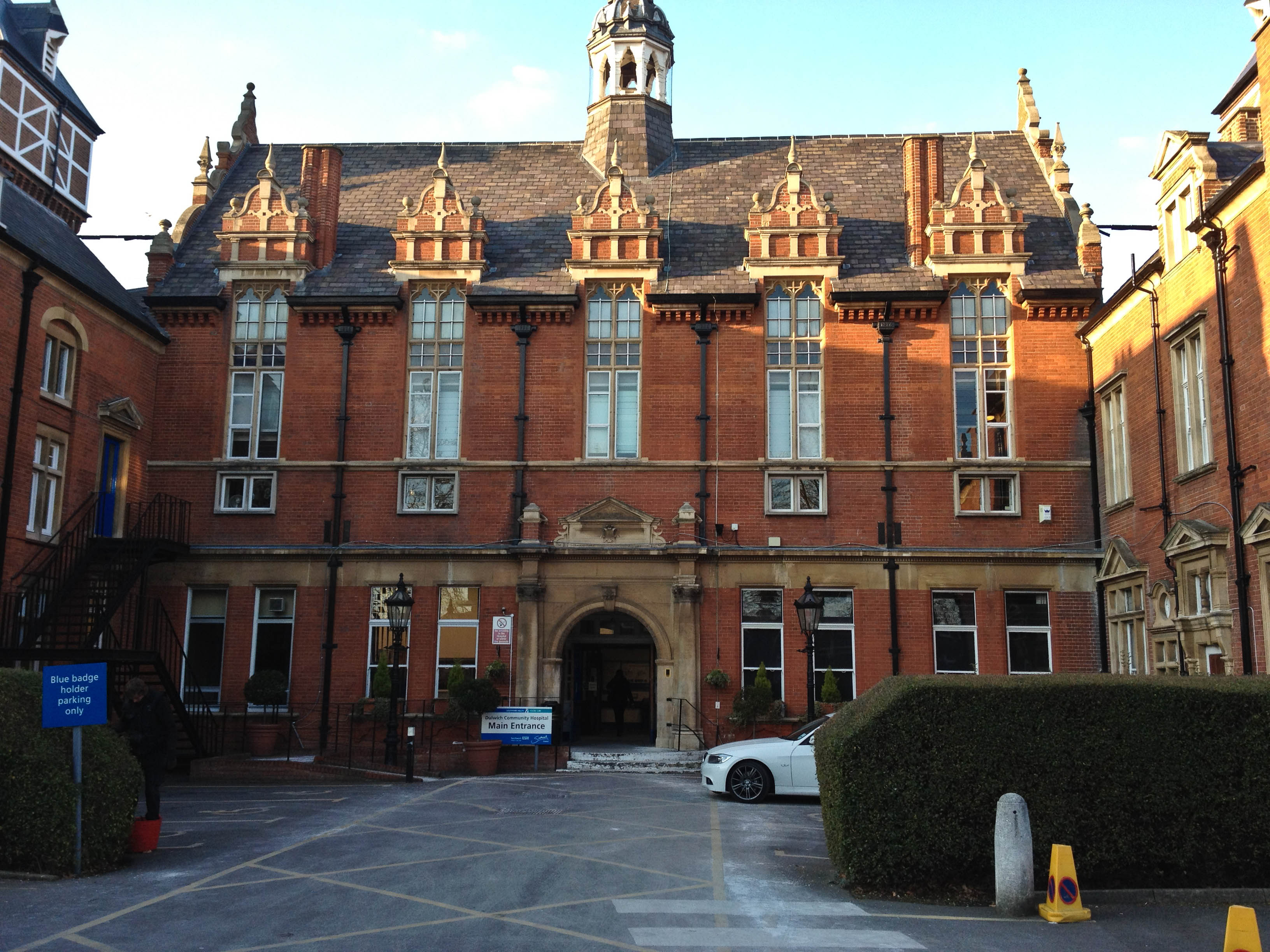
- Dulwich Community Hospital

- Shown in Southwark

Geography
- Location: East Dulwich Grove, Southwark SE22 8PT, London, England
- Coordinates: 51.4585°N 0.0813°W

Organisation
- Care system: NHS England

Services
- Emergency department: No

History
- Founded: 1887; 139 years ago
- Closed: 2020

Links
- Lists: Hospitals in England

Dulwich Community Hospital was a hospital located in Dulwich, in South London.

== History ==
The hospital has its origins in the St Saviour's Union Infirmary, the creation of which was the subject of strong objections from Charles Barry, who was concerned about the potential for a reduction in house prices, and Sir Henry Bessemer, who was concerned about interruptions to his view. Nevertheless the infirmary went ahead and opened in 1887. It was built by the Guardians of the Poor of the parish of Southwark St Saviour to ease pressure from overcrowding at their existing workhouse infirmary in Newington. It had 723 beds at the time it opened.

It was renamed the Southwark Union Infirmary in 1902 and it then served as the Southwark Military Hospital during the First World War. It was the first London infirmary to be evacuated to accommodate war casualties. In 1915 the infirmary was passed to the Royal Army Medical Corps. Existing staff stayed and were joined by nurses from the Voluntary Aid Detachment. British and Empire troops were treated, including American, Australian, South African, and Canadian soldiers. The number of beds was increased to 820 and tents were erected in the grounds as sleeping accommodation for soldiers who were up all day. They were fitted with beds and lockers and were described as being 'cosy and warm'. The same visitor observed the hospital wards as being 'long and bright, and we were struck by the large number of men in bed, but even these were smoking and reading or playing games.' During this period, 12,522 soldiers were treated and only 119 died. The hospital was returned to civilian service in April 1919. A grade II listed memorial cross stands outside the hospital.

The name was changed to Southwark Hospital in 1921 and at the time of the hospital's transfer to the London County Council in 1930 it was renamed Dulwich Hospital. The initial medical superintendent was HW Bruce, MD, BS (London), FRCS being replaced by Roberts MD, MS (London) in September 1930. The steward was CTP Smith. The Matron was Miss RE Wallace. Wallace was awarded the Royal Red Cross of the first order in 1917. She was also a Fellow of the British College of Nursing.

Dulwich Hospital joined the National Health Service in 1948. During the 1980s St Francis Hospital became the north wing of Dulwich Hospital and a tunnel under the railway line connected the two sites.

From 1964 until 2004 the hospital was owned by the Kings College Hospital Trust. It was a district hospital and a centre of excellence for renal treatment. In 2004 it was passed to the Southwark NHS Primary Care Trust. In 2005 most health services ceased, although the NHS continues to offer limited community services from the south wing.

== Recent history ==
In 2016 Southwark Council received consent from the Greater London Authority to build a health centre and school on the site, and to demolish the remaining ward blocks, walkways, and nurse’s quarters. The construction of the Charter School East Dulwich was completed in 2018. The health centre, which was named the Tessa Jowell Health Centre after the local MP, was completed in April 2020.

Badges awarded to nurses who trained at Dulwich Hospital

Following refurbishment, part of the main hospital building reopened as a unit for children with special educational needs and disabilities in October 2025.

== Architectural features ==
The building, described at the time by the South London Press as being one of the finest of its kind, was designed by Henry Jarvis & Son, reputable local architects (who also designed Southwark Town Hall building). The contractors were Kirk and Randall of Woolwich, prominent London builders who constructed numerous notable buildings, including the grade I listed Greek Cathedral of Aghia Sophia in Bayswater.

The landowner of the site, Mr E. J. Bailey, wrote in 1881 that he would only sell the land on condition 'that a public building only should be erected thereupon and the elevation thereof should be of an ornamental character.' Accordingly, the building was given unusually decorative features, not normally seen in an infirmary. These included a first floor walkway decorated with ornamental arches, distinctive ogee domed 'onions' which topped sanitorium towers, and can be seen from many points in the locality, slim spiky gables above the tall chapel windows, elaborate strapwork in the Dutch gables of the staff houses, turrets and balconies. It was constructed of Leicester red brick with dressings of Ancaster stone, in a neo-Flemish style.

The hospital was designed with a symmetrical, pavilion layout consisting of a large central administrative block flanked by two blocks (pavilions) of Nightingale wards on either side. An open walkway acted as a spine connecting the administration block to the ward blocks – spanning the whole width of the building's five blocks (1/8 mile). To the rear of the administration block were the kitchens and stores. Nurse's quarters with Arts and Crafts-inspired features were built parallel to the end Western ward block in the early 20th century.

The hospital reflected latest thinking in medical practice. The Nightingale ward plan was a common theme of that era. Florence Nightingale was a proponent of the idea that the high patient mortality rate could be reduced with good ventilation and sunlight. To this end, Nightingale wards were designed as narrow blocks with tall windows at regular intervals along both sides to allow cross-ventilation. Single beds lined each side. Dulwich hospital had 24 Nightingale wards (12 for men and 12 for women) each containing 26–30 beds. The ward blocks were placed in an approximate North-South direction to maximise daylight. Each end of the wards had open balconies large enough so around 3–4 patients could be wheeled out onto them. The wards each contained several isolation rooms. The toilets were in sanitorium towers either side of the balconies. The beds had gratings underneath which admitted fresh air and the open style of the arched walkways exposed staff to fresh air. The, now demolished, Eastern ward block had a basement story of open piers and arches allowing a free circulation of the air beneath the ground floor. There was a basement tramway for trolleys to transport coal.
