= Julian Knowles =

Julian Knowles may refer to:

- Julian Knowles (composer) (born 1965), Australian composer and performer
- Sir Julian Knowles (judge) (born 1969), British High Court judge

== See also ==
- Julian Knowle (born 1974), Austrian tennis player
