= Murders of Bibaa Henry and Nicole Smallman =

Double homicide in London, United Kingdom

- Location: Fryent Country Park, London
- Date: 6 June 2020 c. 1:00 a.m.
- Weapon: 12cm Kitchen knife
- Deaths: 2
- Injuries: 1 (The perpetrator)
- Perpetrator: Danyal Hussein
- Convictions: Life sentence (with a minimum term of 35 years)

On 6 June 2020, Black British sisters Bibaa Henry, aged 46, and Nicole Smallman, aged 27, were murdered by 18-year-old British Kurd, Danyal Hussein in Fryent Country Park, London. At around 1 a.m., Hussein, armed with a 12 cm kitchen knife, stabbed Henry eight times and Smallman 28 times as she fought back. They were found by Smallman’s boyfriend in a wooded area 36 hours later and a day after they were reported missing to police.

Hussein was charged with the murders and convicted in July 2021. He was sentenced to life, with a minimum 35-year term. Hussein was motivated by his belief killing the sisters as part of an occult ritual would bring him financial wealth. The case also featured police misconduct, when two constables posed with the victim's bodies for selfies which they shared with others.

The reporting and investigation of the killings provoked widespread discussion of women's safety, police misconduct and systemic racism. The incident also provoked discussion of the ease of online access to violent cultist and political material, which influenced and motivated the killer.

The mother of the two victims, Mina Smallman, called on the Metropolitan Police Chief Cressida Dick to resign over the way the case was handled. Following this and other controversies, Dick resigned in February 2022.

== Victims ==
Bibaa Henry (born 5 June 1974) lived in Wembley, north-west London, and was a social worker at Buckinghamshire Council described by her family as being "a passionate advocate for safeguarding vulnerable children and families".

Nicole Smallman (born 3 August 1992) lived in Harrow, north-west London, and worked as a freelance photographer. She was a graduate of the University of Westminster.

They were the daughters of the Venerable Mina Smallman, the Church of England's first female archdeacon from a black and minority ethnic background.

== Murders ==
Bibaa, Nicole, and friends had been celebrating Bibaa's birthday by hosting a picnic in Fryent Country Park on the evening of 5 June 2020. CCTV footage captured the sisters making their way to the birthday picnic, held locally due to COVID-19 lockdown restrictions in the United Kingdom. After guests had left the celebration, the two sisters remained in the park. Nicole sent her boyfriend a text message at 1:05 a.m., informing him that she and Bibaa were dancing in a field, and photographs from a mobile phone recovered at the scene, taken around 1:15 a.m., showed Bibaa and Nicole playing with fairy lights. The sisters were murdered before 2:30 a.m., when phone calls from relatives and friends went unanswered.

Family and friends reported the sisters missing on the evening of 6 June and were advised policemen would deploy resources to conduct enquiries into their whereabouts, but they failed to do so. Nicole’s boyfriend, Adam Stone, his parents, and a friend of Bibaa went looking for the sisters on 7 June in Fryent Country Park, finding their sunglasses and a bloodied knife. Stone discovered their bodies shortly after under a treeline and called police. Bibaa had eight stab wounds, while Nicole was stabbed around 28 times.

== Perpetrator ==
18-year-old Danyal Hussein (born 10 May 2002), of Iraqi Kurdish heritage, was arrested on 1 July 2020 at his mother's home in Eltham, south-east London. He was a student at Orpington College and was diagnosed with autism. Hussein had drawn up a handwritten contract, signed in his own blood, which states that he had made a pact with Lucifuge Rofocale, a demon mentioned in the Grand Grimoire, a historic black magic text, to murder six women every six months in return for financial reward including winning a lottery jackpot. Another note contained an offer of blood sacrifice to "demon Queen Byleth [sic]" in exchange for making a fellow student fall in love with him. Three days before the murders, Hussein had bought several 12-cm kitchen knives as a block set at Asda, ordered a black balaclava via Amazon, and signed onto an online lottery betting website.

At the Old Bailey, Oliver Glasgow QC said, "Why he chose [the sisters] or what it was about them that caught his attention is also unclear. But, once their friends had left, two of them were far more vulnerable: distracted by the fun they were having, eye-catching because of the lights they were playing with, and now on their own."

CCTV footage showed Hussein leaving his parents' house at 7:45 pm on 5 June and taking a bus to Edgware Road to pick up a delivery package, containing a balaclava and two folding shovels. He then went to Fryent Country Park, which he was recorded leaving several hours later at approximately 4 a.m. on 6 June, missing his trousers and with his jacket wrapped around his waist, his right hand tucked into the jacket to hem a bleeding cut to his hand, which was accidentally self-inflicted during his attack on the sisters. When he needed treatment for it the next day, he told staff at Northwick Park Hospital that he had been mugged. Investigators believed he would have committed more murders had it not been for the injury, which impeded his ability to hold objects. On 30 June 2020, a DNA sample was linked by police to Hussein's father, who had a past caution. For this reason, the Husseins' home was raided by police.

From October 2017 to May 2018, he was monitored by the Prevent strategy when at 15, he accessed far-right material on computers at Thomas Tallis School. Police searches of his devices after his arrest showed that he was still accessing far-right and Satanist material.

Hussein was a viewer of videos by American self-styled occultist Matthew Lawrence, also known as E. A. Koetting, of Apple Valley, Utah. Lawrence was a member of a U.S. branch of the Order of Nine Angles and had been convicted of six third-degree felonies for possession of drugs and a restricted firearm in 2014. Hussein was active on Lawrence's Satanic-themed internet forum, Becoming A Living God, on which Hussein alleged he was a "psychic vampire" and asked for advice about demonic pacts. Hussein was active on that forum for two years and last logged in hours before his arrest. Lawrence advised that pacts should be entered to Lucifuge, signed in blood, brought to Lucifuge with only candle light, and organised for wealth; Hussein followed these instructions. In the ten days following the murders, Hussein spent £162.88 on lottery tickets and bets but won nothing. Lawrence's videos on YouTube were subsequently removed and his accounts on Facebook and Instagram were banned for promoting violence.

== Legal proceedings ==
Danyal Hussein was charged with two counts of murder. He told police he had Asperger syndrome and memory problems and refused to answer questions. He pleaded not guilty at the Old Bailey on 11 March 2021. The trial began on 9 June 2021 at the Old Bailey. Prosecutor Oliver Glasgow QC told the jury, "Given the weight of the evidence against him, only someone who actually believes that an agreement with a demon will work could refuse to accept any aspect of the case against him. ... It is hard to imagine that anyone could do to another human being what this defendant did to Bibaa and Nicole; but to have planned it, to have prepared it and to have performed it with such ruthless selfishness is truly terrifying. He did not care what he had to do to get what he wanted, and these two women were nothing more than a means to a very disturbing end."

Hussein was convicted of both murders on 6 July 2021. In October 2021 Mrs Justice Whipple sentenced him to life imprisonment with a minimum term of 35 years. Whipple told Hussein, "You committed these vicious attacks. You did it to kill. You did it for money and a misguided pursuit of power. This was a calculated and deliberate course of conduct, planned and carried out with precision. Bizarre though the pact with the devil may appear to others, this was your belief system, your own commitment to the murder of innocent women." He is imprisoned at HMP Belmarsh and will become eligible for parole on 20 July 2055.

== Police misconduct ==
In the month following the incident, two police officers, PC Deniz Jaffer, 48, and PC Jamie Lewis, 33, were charged with misconduct for sharing "inappropriate" photographs of the crime scene, causing distress to the family and general public. The officers had taken selfies next to the sisters' dead bodies. The Independent Office for Police Conduct (IOPC) launched an inquiry into the behaviour of the police officers. Images had been shared on a WhatsApp group and a further six officers were investigated for failing to either challenge or report this. The IOPC reported that: "The investigation has also uncovered further alleged misconduct breaches of the standards of professional behaviour for a small number of officers which include honesty and integrity, and equality and diversity". The two officers pleaded guilty to misconduct in public office. Lewis was dismissed from the police, while Jaffer had already resigned.

In December 2021, the two officers were each sentenced to two years and nine months in jail. Mina Smallman, mother of the murdered sisters said in a victim impact statement, "It made me think of the lynchings in the Deep South of USA where you would see smiling faces around a hanging dead body. Those police officers felt so safe, so untouchable that they felt they would take photographs with our murdered daughters. Those police officers dehumanised our children." Jaffer and Lewis had undermined trust in the police, an Old Bailey judge said when jailing them. Following investigation of Jaffer's phone, it was found that he had used racist language regarding a separate case involving the assault of South Asian men. In June 2022 three police officers who received the pictures without challenging them or reporting them each received written warnings but were allowed to keep their jobs. Former Met chief superintendent Dal Babu said: "If you have something as horrific as pictures of dead women taken, the individuals should be reported. It is more appropriate for them not to be in the police service. The fact they remain is worrying. It sends out the wrong message. It will only add to the heartache of the family. It does not reflect the seriousness of what they did."

Mina Smallman has since worked to raise awareness of the misconduct of the police and failures in the investigation of her daughters' deaths. She said that racism ensured that the coverage of these black women's deaths was different from similar instances of stranger killings of white women. Mina Smallman maintains the police did not care about the missing sisters before the bodies were found because one was "a black woman who lives on a council estate."

Mina Smallman spoke about Hussein after his conviction, saying that she would not spend her life hating him; she voiced concern that he would be further radicalised in prison.

The Independent Office for Police Conduct (IOPC) carried out a separate inquiry into how calls from worried relatives and friends were handled by the police. The level of service provided by the police force to the family was found to be "unacceptable". An apology was issued to the family. The IOPC stated that police logs were closed after a family member gave information about the sisters' possible whereabouts, but a communications supervisor recorded the information "inaccurately".

== Reactions ==
Vigils were held to remember the victims. The vigil at Fryent Country Park on 3 August 2021 organised by Reclaim These Streets (the same group who organised the vigil for Sarah Everard), was attended by Mayor of London Sadiq Khan, Dawn Butler, David Lammy and other notable figures.

The family considered legal action over the police misconduct. Dame Cressida Dick of the Metropolitan Police said: "The Met is not free of discrimination, racism or bias. I have always acknowledged that and do now again".

Barry Gardiner MP of the local Brent North constituency told the Today programme that the Metropolitan Police "need to have a root and branch reform in the way in which it operates, the way in which it treats people". A local councillor for Brent who leads the borough's community safety also criticised the Met, telling the Brent & Kilburn Times that an apology is "no substitute for action."

== Violence against women and girls ==
In the following year, the murders were mentioned in coverage relating to the murders of other women in London such as Sarah Everard and Sabina Nessa. While each incident was different, they served to frame a wider picture of the tackling of violence against women in London and in the UK more widely.

In the foreword of the UK government's strategy for tackling violence against women and girls the Home Secretary Priti Patel said "these crimes are still far too prevalent and there are too many instances of victims and survivors being let down. The tragic cases of Sarah Everard, Julia James, Bibaa Henry and Nicole Smallman touched us all. But for every high-profile case, there are sadly many more. And the pandemic has brought new challenges and presented sick perpetrators with new opportunities as more people stayed at home and went online".

== In popular culture ==
=== Documentaries ===
In 2022, BBC Two aired Two Daughters, a documentary presented by Stacey Dooley, who spent almost a year with Mina and Chris Smallman. The film covers the murders, the police’s handling of the case and the trials of the police officer's, Deniz Jaffer and Jamie Lewis. Mina Smallman said it is important for people to see all aspects of this story.

On 11 May 2025, Sky Documentaries premiered Bibaa & Nicole: Murder in the Park, a documentary about the murders. The series features interviews with the sisters’ mother, Mina Smallman, as well as other family and friends who helped in the search for the sisters, and detectives who worked on the case.

== See also ==
- List of solved missing person cases (2020s)
