= SSLP =

SSLP may refer to:

- Simple sequence length polymorphism (compare RFLP)
- The Slim Shady LP, American singer and rapper Eminem's second studio album (1999)
- Southwark Schools' Learning Partnership
- Sit Still, Look Pretty, Daya song
