= Bejay Mulenga =

British entrepreneur, founder CEO (born 1995)

Bejay Mulenga MBE
- Born: Bejjy Mulenga; 6 July 1995 (age 30); East London, London, United Kingdom
- Education: University of Westminster (Business)
- Occupation: Businessman
- Known for: The Queen's Award for Enterprise Promotion (2016); Founding Supa Network
- Website: bejaymulenga.com

Bejay Mulenga (born 6 July 1995) is a British entrepreneur, founder CEO and creative consultant. He is founder of a training, recruitment and development company Supa Network and co-founder of wellbeing and online food delivery company, The Great Feast of London.

At age 20, Mulenga became the youngest recipient of the Queen's Award for Enterprise Promotion. Mulenga featured in GQ magazine's list of "Britain's 100 Most Connected Men" and spearheaded the non-profit A Plate For London.

== Early life and education ==
Born in East London of Congolese heritage, Mulenga attended St Michael's Catholic College studying Business. Mulenga sat A Levels at St Charles College, and later studied Business Management at the University of Westminster.

== Career ==
In 2009, Mulenga started his career at St Michael's Catholic College, opening a small tuck shop. Encouraged by his entrepreneurial success, Mulenga licensed his brand of tuck shop across several schools. In 2012, he registered his business Supa Tuck, an alternative enterprise programme teaching students how to run and operate their own tuck shops in schools.

In June 2014, Supa Tuck featured in former Secretary of State Lord Young's ‘Enterprise For All’ report which reviewed the relevance of enterprise in education. Next, Mulenga co-founded Supa Academy, a comprehensive business training programme for young people. In September of that same year, Mulenga, delivered a speech at the Conservative Party Conference in Birmingham.

In 2015, with support from Lord Young, and brands including Pepsi Max, Facebook, and Barclays Lifeskills, Supa Academy launched the Supa Market supermarket, a pop-up retail enterprise event. In 2016, Mulenga became the youngest recipient of The Queen's Award for Enterprise Promotion.

Over the next few years, Mulenga oversaw the Supa brand's growth, diversifying into training, B2B education, and consultation.

Mulenga has spoken about his experiences founding and scaling his Supa Network at the US Embassy, The Tory Conference, Global Entrepreneurship Week, TEDx Switzerland and on BBC Radio.

Mulenga was appointed Member of the Order of the British Empire (MBE) in the 2023 New Year Honours for services to entrepreneurship and tackling food poverty.

=== Podcast ===
In 2017, Mulenga launched No More Tea, a podcast on iTunes. Dedicated to creative entrepreneurship, No More Tea offers career advice through conversational interviews. Well known guests have included The Slumflower and Pip Jamieson.

=== The Great Feast of London and A Plate For London ===
Mulenga along with Street Feast's Dominic Cools-Lartigue founded The Great Feast of London. Initially set to run in the summer of 2021 as a series of physical boutique food festivals throughout London's parks, the COVID-19 pandemic caused the duo to bring plans forward. In July 2020, The Great Feast of London launched as a digital food festival and food for delivery platform. Described as a rival to Deliveroo, The Great Feast of London is tied to the founders’ non-profit, A Plate For London which tackles food poverty across the capital by providing meals to Londoners in need.

== Recognition ==
- 2016: Queen's Award for Enterprise Promotion
- 2016: "Britain's 100 Most Connected Men", GQ
- 2017: "7 of London's Most Inspiring Young People", The Evening Standard
