= James Eadie (barrister) =

British barrister

Sir James Eadie KC

First Treasury Counsel (Common Law)
- Incumbent
- Assumed office January 2009
- Monarchs: Elizabeth II; Charles III
- Preceded by: Philip Sales

Personal details
- Born: James Raymond Eadie; March 1962 (age 64) Kensington, London, England
- Parent(s): Douglas George Arnott Eadie; Gillian Carlyon Coates
- Education: Magdalene College, Cambridge
- Occupation: Barrister

Sir James Raymond Eadie, KC (born March 1962) is a British barrister. Since January 2009, he has served as the First Treasury Counsel (Common Law), the government's independent barrister on legal issues of national importance. He represented the UK Government in the R (Miller and Dos Santos) v Secretary of State for Exiting the European Union case in 2016, and in the R (Miller) v The Prime Minister case in 2019.

Eadie was born in March 1962 in Kensington, London, England. He attended Radley College and Magdalene College, Cambridge. He was called to the bar at Middle Temple in 1984 and took silk in 2008. He was appointed knight bachelor in the 2018 Birthday Honours List. In September 2019, he represented the British government in the Supreme Court case to determine the legality of Boris Johnson's prorogation.

In 2020, he successfully represented the Home Secretary in the Supreme Court case of Begum v Home Secretary, concerning the application of Shamima Begum to enter the United Kingdom.

He represented the British government in the Afghan data leak superinjunction case at the Court of Appeal in June 2024; appealing a High Court ruling, he told the court that to discharge the injunction would bring down “immediate risks on the heads of everyone” and that even the intelligence and security committee should not be told about what had happened. The judges agreed, and the case was sent back to the High Court, superinjunction intact; none of this was publicly revealed until July 2025, when the superinjunction was lifted.
