= Sacred Heart Catholic School, Camberwell =

Roman Catholic secondary school located in Camberwell, England

Coordinates: 51.4755°N 0.0972°W

Sacred Heart Catholic School
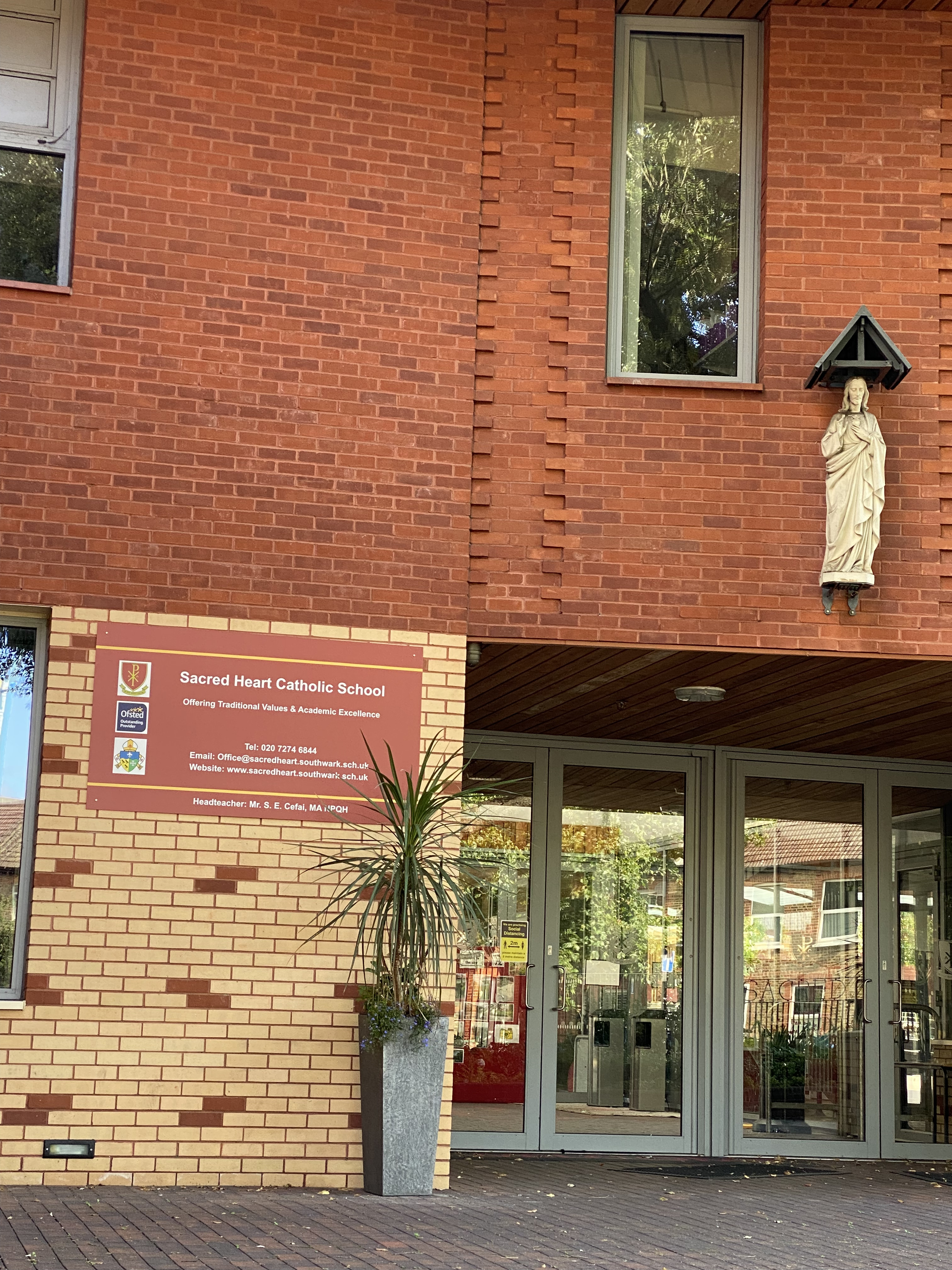

Location
- Camberwell New Road; Camberwell, London, SE5 0RP; England

Information
- Type: Academy
- Motto: In Hoc Signo Vinces (Latin: In this sign, you will conquer.)
- Religious affiliation: Roman Catholic
- Established: 1959
- Local authority: Southwark
- Department for Education URN: 138960 Tables
- Ofsted: Reports
- Headteacher: Richard Lansiquot
- Gender: Mixed
- Age: 11 to 18
- Enrolment: 856 as of January 2023
- Houses: St. Thomas Becket, St. John Bosco, St. Francesca Xavier Cabrini, St. Mary Magdalene
- Website: http://www.sacredheart.southwark.sch.uk/

Sacred Heart Catholic School is a mixed Roman Catholic secondary school and sixth form located in the Camberwell area of the London Borough of Southwark, England.

== History ==
The school was converted to academy status in November 2012, and was previously a voluntary aided school administered by Southwark London Borough Council. Today the school is administered by the Roman Catholic Archdiocese of Southwark, but it continues to coordinate with Southwark London Borough Council for admissions.

In July 2012 temporarily Sacred Heart Catholic School relocated to a site on Trafalgar Street in Walworth while the original school was entirely rebuilt. The temporary site in Walworth is a new school campus developed from the buildings of a Victorian board school. Sacred Heart Catholic School relocated back to its original site in September 2014, and the campus in Walworth opened as University Academy of Engineering South Bank, a new secondary school for the area.

== Notable former pupils ==
- Constance Briscoe, disgraced barrister convicted of perverting the course of justice
- Jordon Ibe, professional footballer
- Martin McDonagh, film director
- Giggs, rapper
- Rapman, rapper
- Akai Coleman, actor, starred in Supacell
