= Mina Smallman =

British archdeacon (born 1956)

The Venerable Mina Smallman MBE
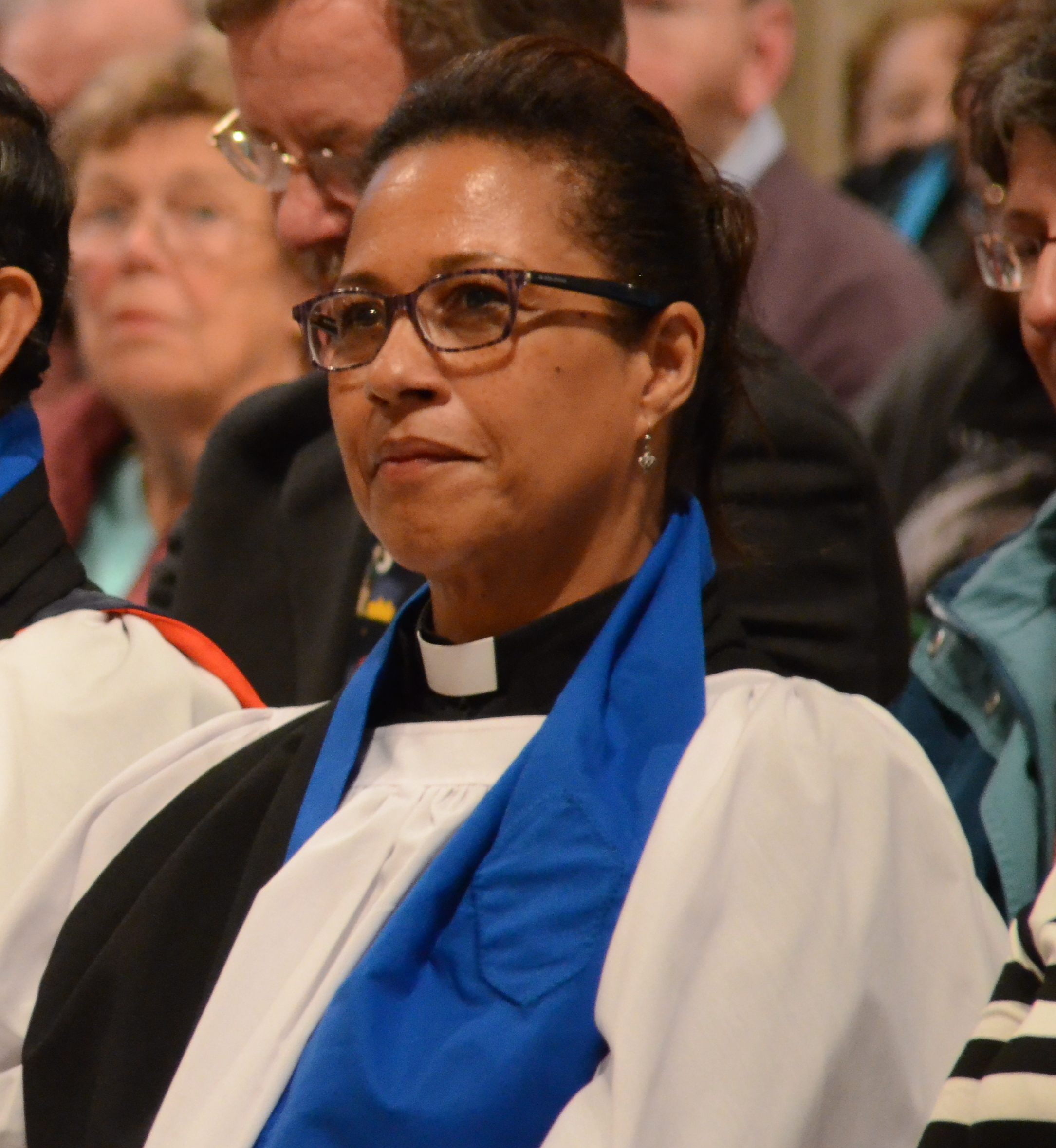
- The Venerable Mina Smallman, 2013
- Born: Wilhelmina Tokcumboh Smallman; 29 October 1956 (age 69); Middlesex, England
- Education: Royal Central School of Speech and Drama; Middlesex University

Wilhelmina Tokcumboh "Mina" Smallman MBE (born 29 October 1956) is a British retired Anglican priest and former school teacher. She served as the Archdeacon of Southend in the Diocese of Chelmsford from September 2013 until her retirement in December 2016. Following the murder of two of her daughters in 2020, she became a campaigner for women's safety and police reform.

== Early life ==
Smallman was born on 29 October 1956 in Middlesex, England. Her mother Catherine was of Scottish descent and her father Bill was of Nigerian heritage.

== Career ==
=== Teaching ===
Smallman studied drama, English and Voice at the Central School of Speech and Drama, graduating with a Bachelor of Education (BEd) degree in 1988. She then worked as a drama teacher for 15 years. By 2005, she was an assistant principal of John Kelly Girls' Technology College.

=== Ordained ministry ===
Smallman trained for ordination on the North Thames Ministerial Training Course. During her training, she also studied contextual theology at Middlesex University, graduating with a Bachelor of Arts (BA) degree in 2006.

Smallman was ordained in the Church of England as a deacon in 2006 and as a priest in 2007. She served her curacy at St Paul's Church, Harrow (2006–2007) and then at the Church of St John the Evangelist, Stanmore (2007–2010). She was then a team vicar in Barking from 2010 until her Archdeacon's appointment.

In June 2013, it was announced that Smallman would be the next Archdeacon of Southend. On 16 September 2013, she was installed as archdeacon during a service at Chelmsford Cathedral. She was the Church of England's first female archdeacon from a black and minority ethnic background. She retired on 31 December 2016.

Smallman says she suffered misogyny and racism throughout her career, mainly due to "privileged white men" who she says "questioned" her right to be a priest.

== Murder of her daughters and subsequent campaigning ==
Two of her daughters, Nicole Smallman and Bibaa Henry, were discovered, stabbed to death, in Fryent Country Park, Brent, on 7 June 2020.

A murder investigation was launched. On 2 July 2020, Danyal Hussein was charged with murdering Nicole and Bibaa. He was found guilty on 6 July 2021 and sentenced to life imprisonment, with a minimum term of 35 years.

Smallman spoke publicly about the police handling of the murder investigation, especially after it was revealed that two police constables had shared photos of the murder scene, stating that Cressida Dick, Commissioner of Police of the Metropolis, tried to mislead her. She has also spoken about her beliefs that the search for her daughters was delayed due to racist elements in the police service.

She is quoted as saying "most of our police force are amazing and doing amazing jobs but there is an element that has taken over the culture of how they banter...and there an element of misogyny in its worst possible form". Smallman maintained that Dick gave the impression that problems with the investigation were unusual and isolated incidents when, in reality Dick knew about investigations of wrongdoing at Charing Cross Police Station and knew there were larger problems. Smallman said: "So she would have known that this wasn't an isolated incident. I didn't expect her to throw herself or the Met under the bus, but to behave in a way that sounds as though 'this is incredible', or 'we've never heard of anything like this in our lives' [the conduct of the officers in Fryent Country Park], it was a lie."

Dick resigned as Commissioner of Police on 10 February 2022.

In 2021, Smallman was chosen by BBC Radio 4's Today programme to be one of seven guest editors during the Christmas period.

In 2024, Smallman stated that she has forgiven the man who murdered her daughters, but that she cannot forgive the police officers who shared pictures of their bodies and who had therefore "violated" them further.

== Personal life ==
Since 1992, she has been married to Christopher. She had two daughters from a previous relationship including Bibaa Henry (born 1974), and the couple had one daughter together, Nicole Smallman (born 1992). Bibaa and Nicole were murdered in 2020.

Smallman has ME/CFS and fibromyalgia.

In February 2025, Smallman was interviewed by Lauren Laverne on the BBC's Desert Island Discs. Her book of choice was The Woman in White by Wilkie Collins and her luxury item was a tub of hair moisturiser.

== Honours ==
Smallman was included in the BBC's 100 Women list for 2021, which honours the most inspiring and influential women from around the world. In 2021, the BBC were concerned to highlight women who are hitting 'reset' - women who are reinventing our society, our culture, and our world. Smallman was recognised for her trailblazing as the first female Church of England archdeacon from a black or ethnic-minority background, and for her campaigning to make UK streets safer and to reform the police.

== Selected works ==
- Smallman, Mina (2024). A Better Tomorrow: Life Lessons in Hope and Strength. London: Ebury Press. ISBN 978-1529199710.
