= Marital coercion =

Legal defense

Marital coercion was a defence to most crimes under English criminal law and under the criminal law of Northern Ireland. It is similar to duress. It was abolished in England and Wales by section 177 of the Anti-social Behaviour, Crime and Policing Act 2014, which came into force on 13 May 2014. The abolition does not apply in relation to offences committed before that date.

== Legislation ==
What had remained of the original common law defence of marital coercion at the date of abolition was contained in section 47 of the Criminal Justice Act 1925:

Any presumption of law that an offence committed by a wife in the presence of her husband is committed under the coercion of the husband is hereby abolished, but on a charge against a wife for any offence other than treason or murder it shall be a good defence to prove that the offence was committed in the presence of, and under the coercion of, the husband.

Section 37 of the Criminal Justice Act (Northern Ireland) 1945 (c.15) (N.I.) is identical to the section cited above and applies to Northern Ireland.

== Differences from duress ==
While the defence of marital coercion has similarities to that of duress, it has significant differences:

- It must be proved that the defendant is the legal wife of the man who coerced her. A mistaken though reasonable belief that she was married will not suffice. Civil partnership does not suffice and a husband cannot claim marital coercion.
- Until 2013 it was thought that the burden of proof lay on the defence to prove marital coercion on the balance of probabilities. (For duress, the burden is on the prosecution to disprove duress beyond reasonable doubt.) However, in the trial of Vicky Pryce the trial judge, Mr Justice Sweeney, ruled that the defence had only to show some evidence that the defence applied in order to require the prosecution to disprove the defence beyond reasonable doubt, as in duress cases.
- Duress is not a valid finding unless there was a threat to kill the defendant or cause them serious harm. The Court of Appeal held in R v Shortland that marital coercion need not involve physical force or the threat of force. (However mere loyalty to her husband does not suffice.)
- Section 47 requires the husband to be present when the offence is committed. The defence of duress does not require the presence of the person who issued the threat, provided that the threat is still effective.
- Duress is not a defence to attempted murder, but attempted murder is not excluded by the text of section 47 from the scope of marital coercion.
- Duress is a defence to some forms of treason, but marital coercion is not.

== Abolition ==
In 1977, the Law Commission recommended that the defence of marital coercion should be abolished altogether. They said that they did not consider it to be appropriate to modern conditions. However no action was taken until after Vicky Pryce advanced the defence of marital coercion at her 2013 trial for perverting the course of justice. She argued that she falsely accepted penalty points under the coercion of her former husband and Liberal Democrat Secretary of State for Energy and Climate Change Chris Huhne MP. Her use of the defence was unsuccessful, and she was unanimously convicted on 7 March 2013. In 2014, the government announced the defence would be abolished.

== Example from the 18th century ==
Mary Day was acquitted of theft committed in obedience to her husband at the Old Bailey on 14 January 1732.

== Outside the United Kingdom ==
In the United States, the defense formerly existed in most jurisdictions. It has since been abolished in several states, including those adopting or influenced by the Model Penal Code, section 2.09(3) of which expressly ends the presumption and abolishes the defense.

In Ireland the case of State (DPP) v Walsh and Conneely in 1981 found that presumption of marital coercion had not survived the enactment of the 1937 Constitution and so the defence is no longer available there.

The Crimes (Amendment) Act 1924, paragraph 4 of Schedule 3 to the Crimes Act 1900 abolished the defence in New South Wales, Australia.
