= Southwark Schools' Learning Partnership =

Group of schools in London, England

Coordinates: 51°29′N 0°5′W

The Southwark School's Learning Partnership is a collaboration of ten schools — seven state and three independent — based in Southwark, a borough of south London, England. The partnership was founded in 2003.

== The aims of the partnership ==
- For staff and pupils from schools in both sectors to work together to develop innovative practice and to share and broaden their experience in order to improve teaching and learning in the participating schools
- To produce research that usefully informs the debate about factors that improve achievement levels for pupils from different backgrounds in inner-city schools
- To increase levels of learning and understanding for staff and pupils throughout the partner schools of what we have in common, what is different, and how we can learn from one another
- To increase understanding of factors that affect pupil achievement, especially those that lead to pupils’ success, through joint inquiries
- To share teachers’ passion and creativity, particularly related to subject knowledge
- To break down barriers and increase understanding between the maintained and independent sectors
- To publish research results to increase the wider understanding of factors that influence pupil achievement

== The co-directors ==
The co-directors are Marion Gibbs (of JAGS) and Irene Bishop (of SSSO). In June 2012, both were appointed CBE in the Queen's birthday honours for Services to Education, including the SSLP. Update: As of 2016, Grainne Grabowski and Joseph Spence are the current co-directors of SSLP.

== Member schools in 2012/2013 ==
- Alleyn's School (Independent)
- Dulwich College (Independent)
- James Allen's Girls' School (Independent)
- St Michael's Catholic College
- Kingsdale School
- St. Thomas the Apostle Catholic College
- St Michael & All Angels Academy
- St Saviour's and St Olave's Church of England School
- The Charter School
- Walworth Academy
