= BES Utilities =

British group of companies

BES Utilities/Ruby Energy
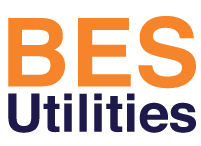
- Type: Private
- Industry: Utilities
- Founded: 2002 (Business Energy Solutions Ltd)
- Headquarters: Fleetwood, Lancashire, United Kingdom
- Key people: Andy Pilley; Michelle Davidson
- Products: Commercial Electricity; Commercial Gas
- Website: www.besutilities.co.uk

BES Utilities/Ruby Energy is a UK-based, independently owned group of companies, comprising Business Energy Solutions Ltd and BES Commercial Electricity Ltd. With offices based in Fleetwood, Lancashire, BES Utilities/Ruby Energy provides commercial electricity and gas to businesses across the United Kingdom. In July 2024 BES announced it was re-branding itself to Ruby Energy from August 2024.

== History ==
Business Energy Solutions Ltd (trading as BES Commercial Gas) was established in 2002 and BES Commercial Electricity Ltd was established in 2009. BES Telecom Ltd was established in 2013 and subsequently sold in 2017. In November 2015, BES Utilities (as it was then) applied for a water services licence with the Water Industry Commission for Scotland.

== Company Growth ==
Since its formation, BES has grown to become one of the largest employers on the Fylde coast, with over 250 employees. BES Utilities was featured in the 2017 London Stock Exchange Group’s 1000 companies to Inspire Britain report. BES Utilities/Ruby Energy was amongst four companies within the North West credited with being the most dynamic and fastest-growing SMEs (small to medium-sized enterprises) in the country. In 2018 the company created an additional 50 new roles based at its Head Office in Fleetwood.

It was revealed through the Andrew Pilley fraud trial that at least 86% of the contracts brokered to BES Utilities came through means of fraud, which was through a sham setup of 'independent brokers'.

== OFGEM Investigation ==
BES Utilities/Ruby Energy were investigated by Office of Gas and Electricity Markets (Ofgem), who found that BES failed to explain in sufficient detail customer contract details and, in some cases, wrongly blocked 108 customers from switching suppliers. The Ofgem investigation resulted in a fine of £2.00, with an agreed redress package of circa £980,000 paid by BES by way of a charitable donation to a debt advice charity and via compensation payments to a number of affected customers.

In September 2023, it was announced that BES (now Ruby Energy) was once again under investigation by Ofgem, following the conviction and imprisonment of Andrew Pilley.

== Failed Legal actions ==
In January 2018, BES Utilities settled a High Court case against two men, in which the company had alleged that they had made false claims about the company for three years.

In July 2017, BES Utilities commenced legal action against Trading Standards' prosecuting authority Cheshire West and Cheshire Council. The matter went to trial in November 2021, with Judgement handed down in August 2022 dismissing the entirety of the claims and finding serial dishonesty on behalf of BES, its Directors and Employees.

== Criminal Investigation and Fraud Trial ==
On 28 July 2016, BES offices were raided by Trading Standards as part of an investigation into mis-selling of contracts by purports independent brokers. BES subsequently launched a £8.6 million claim for damages against Cheshire West and Chester Trading Standards in 2017, which failed.

In September 2021 owner Andrew Pilley was charged with fraud and money laundering offences made through BES. The charges included two counts of running a business with the intention of defrauding creditors or others by allowing the fraudulent mis-selling of energy supply contracts, allowing fraudulent mis-selling by sales representatives, and being concerned with the retention of criminal property.

Between 10 October 2022 and 19 May 2023, the criminal trial took place at Preston Crown Court. On May 19 2023, Pilley was unanimously convicted on all counts. On July 4 2023, Pilley was sentenced to 13 years in jail.

Co-conspirators received other lengthy jail terms. The co-conspirators included BES employee Joel Chapman (sentenced to 8 months imprisonment) who at the time was Head of Regulatory and Compliance; BES Director Michelle Davidson (sentenced to 6 year’s imprisonment); and Lee Qualter/Goulding who was the director of the sham ‘independent brokerages’ in reality controlled by BES and Pilley (sentenced to 7 years imprisonment).

== Charity, Community & Sponsorship ==
=== Fleetwood Town Football Club ===
BES Utilities is the main sponsor of Fleetwood Town Football Club, which is a professional association football club based in the town of Fleetwood, Lancashire, England. Established in 1997, the current Fleetwood Town F.C. is the third incarnation of the club; it was first formed in 1908. The team compete in League One, the third tier of English football. Their home strip is red shirts with white sleeves and white shorts. The home ground is Highbury Stadium in Fleetwood, and the supporters are affectionately known as the Cod Army. The club won the 2011–12 Football Conference, and played in the Football League for the first time in its history in the 2012–13 season. In May 2014, at Wembley, Fleetwood won the promotion play-off to League One, the club's sixth promotion in 10 years.

=== Blackpool Illuminations ===
BES Utilities partnered with Blackpool Illuminations, an annual lights festival in Lancashire, to provide electricity for the lights for free in 2014 and at a discounted rate in 2015. The expected value of the deal exceeded £100,000, making BES the largest contributor to the lights in the last ten years.

=== Brian Rose ===
In 2018 BES Utilities, along with Fleetwood Town F.C. and Card Saver agreed to be the main sponsor of local championship boxer Brian Rose.

=== The BES Fund ===
The Business Energy Solutions Fund is independently managed by a company called Charis Grants, who administer schemes for several leading energy and water companies.

In 2015 BES wrote to all of its non-domestic customers in the flood-affected areas offering financial support in a bid to help those who have suffered damage to buildings and ruined stock.
