= Ark Globe Academy =

Coordinates: 51.4950°N 0.0926°W

Location
- Harper Road; Southwark, London, SE1 6AG; England

Information
- Type: Academy
- Department for Education URN: 135584 Tables
- Ofsted: Reports
- Principal: Matt Jones
- Gender: Mixed
- Age: 3 to 18
- Enrolment: 1,267 as of January 2015
- Website: http://arkglobeacademy.org/

Ark Globe Academy (combining the former Geoffrey Chaucer Technology College and Joseph Lancaster Primary School) is a mixed all-through school located in Southwark, London, England.

The school caters for children from Reception age through to sixth form. It is part of the Ark school network, operated by the charitable organisation Ark. The academy moved to a new purpose-built combined building in 2010.

== History ==
=== Chaucer School ===
On Friday March 19 1993, after two boys were given a detention by a 27 year old French teacher. One of the boys, under 14, allegedly raped the French teacher at knifepoint. Due to being under 14, he could not be charged of rape. The other boy was 14. The case was dropped due to lack of evidence in April 1993.

=== Academy ===
Globe Academy (later Ark Globe Academy) was created as an academy in 2008 from a merger of Geoffrey Chaucer Technology College and Joseph Lancaster Primary School.

- Barack Obama and David Cameron visited the school on 24 May 2011.
