= Andrew Pilley =

English businessman

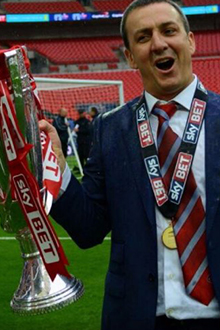
- Pilley in May 2014, when Fleetwood Town won promotion to League One via the play-offs.
- Born: Andrew James Pilley; 26 May 1970 (age 56); Blackpool, England
- Occupation: Businessman
- Board member of: Chairman of Fleetwood Town Football Club; February 2004 – 23 May 2023

Andrew James Pilley (born 26 May 1970) is an English businessman, convicted criminal, and former football club chairman. He was previously the chairman of EFL League One club Fleetwood Town and League of Ireland First Division side Waterford. Pilley was also the chairman of an independent commercial utility group BES Utilities.

== Background ==
Pilley was born in Blackpool in 1970, and began his career in the mid-90's in the energy sector working for Enron.

Pilley then worked as a Post Office clerk, where he became involved in a theft conspiracy. The conspiracy involved stealing cheques posted in the mail, otherwise intended for the disabled or elderly to assist with their living. The conspiracy led him to a 4-month prison sentence in Kirkham Prison for conspiracy to steal, with him being released in April 1998.

== BES Utilities and other commercial interests ==
Pilley worked at a Manchester utility company that was affected by the Enron scandal, which resulted in Pilley losing his job. He then founded his own utilities brokerage business, BES Utilities. He was later joined by his sister, Michelle Davidson. In February 2005, a gas supply licence was approved for the company. After receiving a licence from Ofgem, BES Utilities became a licensed gas shipper in March 2008.

Pilley acquired an electricity supply licence for BES Commercial Electricity Ltd in 2009, and both companies now form the BES Utilities group. The companies saw significant growth, and in 2009 were one of the largest employers on the Fylde coast, with over 200 staff based at their Head Office.

== Fleetwood Town Football Club ==
Pilley became chairman of Fleetwood Town Football Club in 2003. After he was convicted of fraud in May 2023 Pilley resigned as chairman and announced that the club was for sale.

== Legal actions ==
Between 2014 and 2015, BES Utilities was investigated by the Office of Gas and Electricity Markets (Ofgem), which found that BES failed to explain customer contracts in sufficient detail and wrongly blocked 108 customers from switching suppliers. The Ofgem investigation resulted in a fine of £2.00, with an agreed redress package of £980,000. Of the £980,000, £311,000 was paid to consumers affected by the breaches, and the remaining £669,000 was paid to a debt advice charity

In July 2017, BES Utilities commenced legal action against Trading Standards' prosecuting authority Cheshire West and Cheshire Council. The matter went to trial in November 2021, and in August 2022 all claims were dismissed.

In January 2018, BES Utilities settled a High Court case against two men, in which the company had alleged that they had made false claims about the company for three years. Following Pilley's convictions for fraud, the claim was abandoned altogether.

== Fraud trial ==
In September 2021, after a five-year fraud investigation, Pilley was charged with multiple counts of fraud concerning his running of BES Utilities. Fraud charges included two counts of running a business to defraud creditors or others by allowing the fraudulent mis-selling of energy supply contracts, allowing fraudulent mis-selling by sales representatives, and being concerned with retaining criminal property.

Pilley pled not guilty to all charges and a criminal trial started at Preston Crown Court in October 2022.

On 19 May 2023, after a protracted and frequently interrupted fraud trial at Preston Crown Court lasting 9 months, Pilley was unanimously convicted on all counts relating to mis-selling energy supplies and immediately remanded into custody, with the judge commenting that he should expect a significant custodial sentence. He was convicted of running a business to defraud creditors, one count of false representation and one count of being concerned with retaining criminal property.

On 4 July 2023, he was sentenced to a 13-year jail sentence. In the course of sentencing Pilley, the presiding judge admonished Pilley as being "highly litigious", a "hypocrite", and for demanding special treatment during the criminal trial.

== Philanthropy ==
In 2012, Pilley and fellow trustees founded the Fleetwood Town Community Trust, which provides social programs within the community. In February 2019, Pilley and FTFC pledged £10,000 to help prevent bullying in schools by supporting a training programme. Pilley, along with BES Utilities and Card Saver, also pledged £20,000 to the MADD About Bullying programme.

Fleetwood Town FC, BES Utilities, and Card Saver sponsor local professional boxer Brian 'The Lion' Rose. Pilley also gave Rose full use of facilities at Poolfoot Farm, along with access to coaches and physios.

In 2018, Pilley and Fleetwood Town FC partnered with East Pines Park and offered to maintain their football pitches. Following improvement work and maintenance, the pitch now hosts a variety of community football sessions.

In 2020, Pilley provided financial support for the England Amputee FA's under-23 squad to attend the German training camp and gave the group free use of the Cod Army’s Poolfoot Farm training base.

Pilley's other philanthropy activities include:

- Sponsor of Thornton Christmas Lights
- Creation of the BES Fund to support businesses with energy or other debts
- Funder of national charity, Business Debtline

== Political views ==
Pilley endorsed the Conservative Party in the 2019 United Kingdom general election.
