= Regulatory law =

Regulatory law refers to secondary legislation, including regulations, promulgated by an executive branch agency under a delegation from a legislature; as well as legal issues related to regulatory compliance. It contrasts with statutory law promulgated by the legislative branch, and common law or case law promulgated by the judicial branch.

Regulatory law also refers to the law that governs conduct of administrative agencies (both promulgation of regulations, and adjudication of applications or disputes), and judicial review of agency decisions, usually called administrative law. Administrative law is promulgated by the legislature (and refined by judicial common law) for governing agencies.

The administrative agencies create procedures to regulate applications, licenses, appeals and decision making. In the United States, the Administrative Procedure Act is responsible for all federal agency policies.
