= Nightingale ward =

Style of hospital ward

A Nightingale ward is a type of hospital ward that contains one large room without subdivisions for patient occupancy. It may have side rooms for utilities and perhaps one or two side rooms that can be used for patient occupancy when patient isolation or patient privacy is important. Nightingale wards contain about 24 to 34 beds, usually arranged along the sides of the ward. Modern wards tend to separate patients into bays, each usually containing 4 to 6 beds. Observation of patients by nursing staff tends to be easier in a Nightingale ward than in bays, although one study indicates that 75% of patients preferred being nursed in a bay than in a Nightingale ward.

The Nightingale ward was named after the pioneer of modern nursing, Florence Nightingale.
