= Julian Knowles (judge) =

British judge

The Honourable Mr Justice Julian Knowles
- Royal coat of arms of the United Kingdom

High Court Judge King's Bench Division
- In office 2 October 2017 – 30 March 2026
- Monarch: Charles III

Personal details
- Born: 26 January 1969 (age 57) Manchester, England
- Education: Balliol College, Oxford

Sir Julian Bernard Knowles (born 26 January 1969) is a retired British High Court judge.

== Educational and early life ==
Knowles was born in Manchester and lived in Wythenshawe council estate. He was educated at comprehensives St John Plessington High School and Xaverian College. He studied at Balliol College, Oxford and completed a BA in mathematics in 1990. At Oxford he was offered a place to complete a DPhil in mathematics, but decided to pursue law after volunteering as a paralegal to help death row inmates in Oklahoma.

== Career ==
Knowles was called to the bar at Inner Temple in 1994. At the bar, he specialised in criminal law and public law and practised from Matrix Chambers. He successfully represented the appellant in R v Jogee at the UK Supreme Court. He also appeared in the Pinochet extradition case and R v Huhne. In addition to practice, he was co-author of Nicholls, Montgomery, Knowles: The Law of Extradition and Mutual Legal Assistance in 2002 which was taken into a third edition and The Abolition of the Death Penalty in the United Kingdom: how it happened and why it still matters in 2015. He served as a recorder from 2009 to 2017 and took silk in 2011. In 2017, he was appointed a deputy High Court judge.

=== High Court appointment ===
On 2 October 2017, Knowles was appointed a judge of the High Court and assigned to the Queen's Bench Division. He took the customary knighthood in the same year.

Knowles retired from the High Court on 30 March 2026.

== Personal life ==
In 2011, Knowles married Dr Nicola Levitt, with whom he has one son. In his Who's Who entry, he listed his interests as "electronic dance music, looking in bookshops, lager, making bread". He is a supporter of Manchester City F.C.
