= Charter School East Dulwich =

Coordinates: 51.4599°N 0.0809°W

The Charter School East Dulwich

Location
- Jarvis Road; Dulwich; London, SE22 8RB; England

Information
- Type: Free school
- Established: 2016
- Department for Education URN: 142178 Tables
- Ofsted: Reports
- Headteacher: Alison Harbottle
- Gender: Coeducational
- Age: 11 to 17
- Enrolment: 777
- Colours: Green, Yellow and White
- Website: chartereastdulwich.org.uk

The Charter School East Dulwich is a coeducational secondary school and sixth form located in the Dulwich area of the London Borough of Southwark, England.

On 9 March 2015, it was announced by the Department for Education that The Charter School Education Trust (the Academy Trust that runs the Charter School North Dulwich) was to enter pre-opening phase for a new school to be built on part of the site of the current Dulwich Hospital. The school building, designed by Feilden Clegg Bradley Studios and constructed by The Kier Group opened to pupils in January 2019.

The school formally opened in September 2016, and in 2022 had just under 780 pupils on its roll from Year 7 to Year 12.

Following refurbishment, part of the main hospital building reopened as a unit for children with special educational needs and disabilities in October 2025.
