= Pip Jamieson =

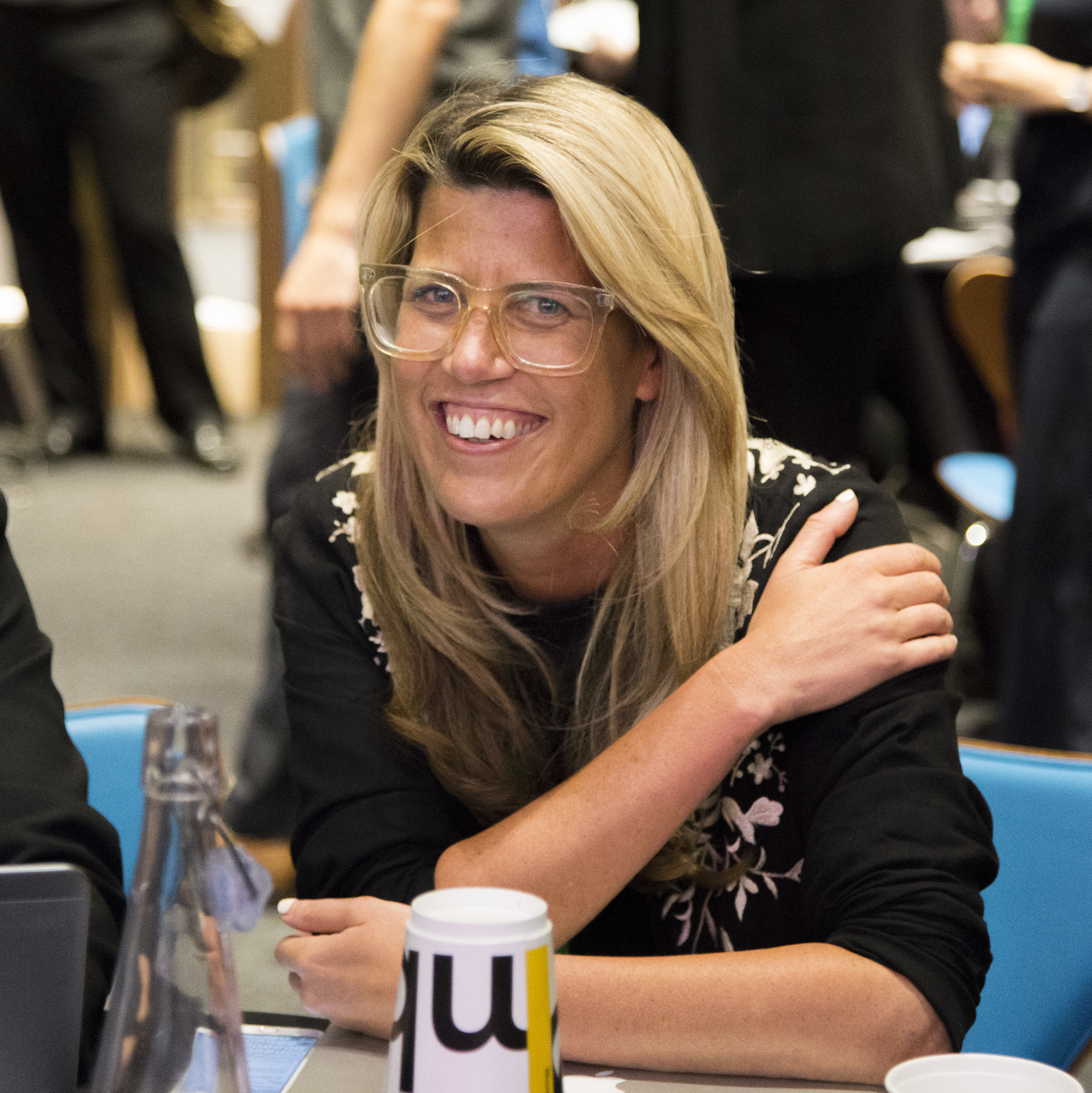
- Jamieson at a Wikipedia editathon
- Born: 1980 (age 45–46)
- Education: University of Edinburgh (MA)
- Employer: The Dots
- Website: the-dots.com

Pip Jamieson (born 1980) is the founder and Chief Executive Officer (CEO) of The Dots, a professional network for people in the creative industry.

== Education and early life ==
Jamieson was born in New Zealand to British parents. Her father worked in the music industry. She is dyslexic and could not read until she was 11 years old. She studied economics at the University of Edinburgh and graduated with first class Master of Arts (MA) degree with honours.

== Career ==
After graduating, Jamieson joined the Government of the United Kingdom fast-track civil service program for economists. She worked for David Blunkett.

Jamieson joined the creative industries in 2004, working for the Brit Awards then as Head of Business Strategy for MTV Australia. She helped to develop the model that launched MTV and Nickelodeon to New Zealand. She launched the Mile High Gig in 2008, where Dizzee Rascal performed live on a flight from Auckland to Sydney. Jamieson believes that homogeneous teams are dangerous for creativity. At MTV she struggled to find new talent and service providers.

In 2009 she launched The Loop in Australia, a visual networking platform that was used by 67% of Australian professionals.

=== The Dots ===
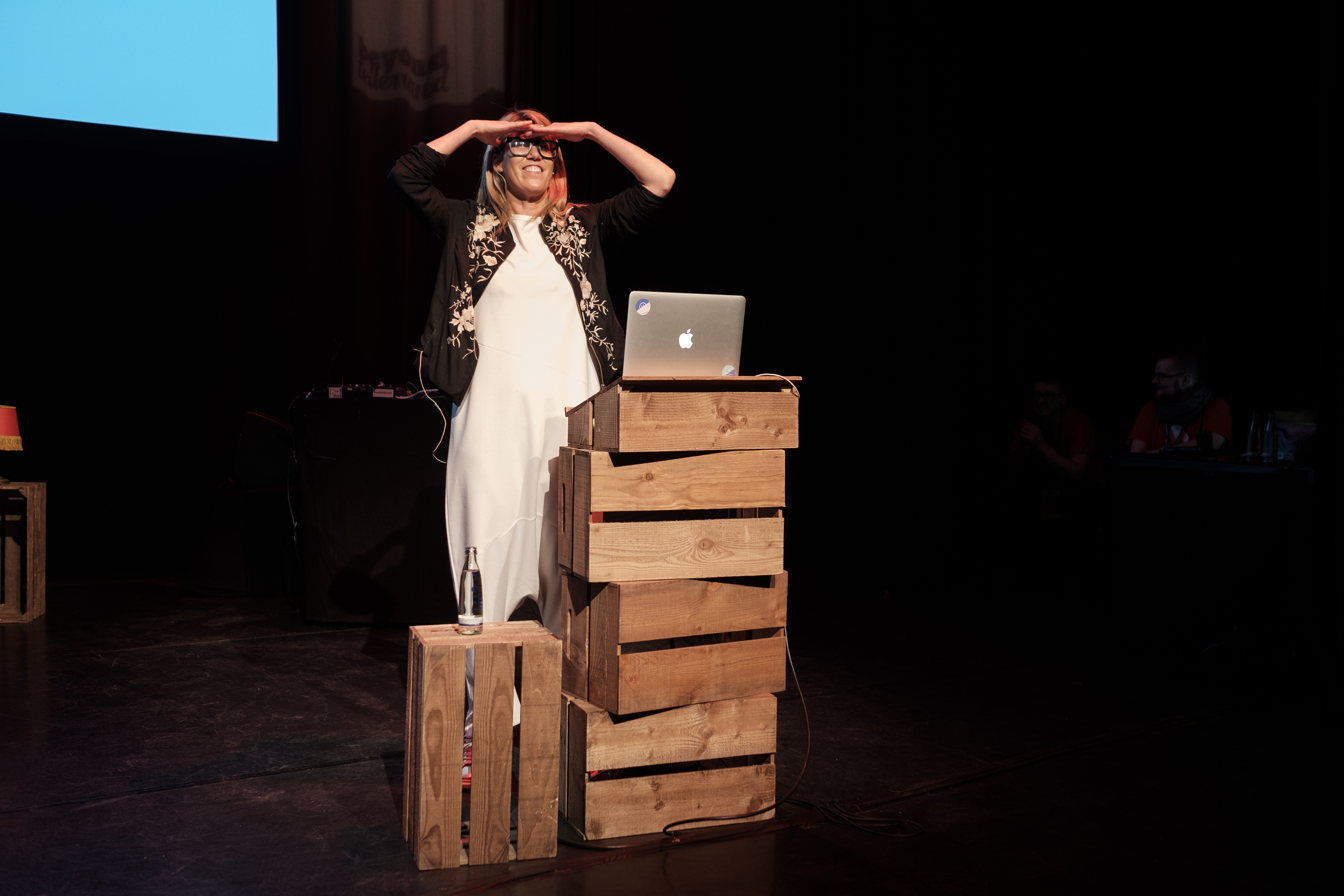
Jamieson talking about Creative Ambition in Berlin in 2017

Jamieson moved to the UK in 2014 and lived on a houseboat in Kings Cross, London. She noticed that there was no networking site for people in the creative industries, as LinkedIn is optimised for a white-collar workforce. She launched the Dots, a professional network that is used by 10% of the UK creative sector. She raised £4 million from Hambro Perks Ltd., John Hegarty and Tom Teichman. Jamieson appointed John Hegarty as chairman. Their membership is around 500k, 62% of whom are women and 31% Black, Asian and minority ethnic (BAME). It does not allow for companies to search for candidates by their alma mater, making sure people are judged based on their work. Their clients include Tate, Somerset House, Google, Channel 4, Soho House and Facebook. She has appeared on several podcasts and radio shows, including for Monocle magazine. She believes that happier teams are more productive.

In July 2018, Jamieson launched an LGBTQ+ takeover on The Dots to celebrate Pride Month.

=== Honours and awards ===
In 2017 Jamieson was named by Creative Review as one of the Top 50 Leaders in the UK.

She was named as one of The Sunday Times Top 100 Disruptive Entrepreneurs, and British Interactive Media Association (BIMA) Top 100. She was listed as one of the 2018 Campaign trailblazers for change. She is concerned about algorithmic bias. She supports companies that celebrate diversity in technology and creativity.

Jamieson was part of Sadiq Khan's Silicon Valley Comes to the UK (SVC2UK) trip in May 2018.

In November 2018 she was named as one of the Inspiring50 Top 50 Women in Technology in the UK.
