= Ark Walworth Academy =

Coordinates: 51.4877°N 0.0782°W

Location
- Shorncliffe Road; Walworth; London, SE1 5UJ; England

Information
- Type: Academy
- Established: 2007
- Local authority: Southwark
- Trust: Ark Schools
- Department for Education URN: 135315 Tables
- Ofsted: Reports
- Principal: Jessica West
- Gender: Co-educational
- Age: 11 to 18
- Enrolment: 1023
- Website: http://www.walworthacademy.org

Ark Walworth Academy (formerly Walworth School, Walworth Central School, Mina Road School and Mina Road Higher Grade School) is a co-educational comprehensive secondary school and sixth form located in the Walworth area of London, England.

== History ==
The school has its origins in Mina Road School which opened during the late Victorian era. Pupils included Albert Edward McKenzie who won the Victoria Cross.

Walworth School was established in 1946 as an 'experimental' or 'interim' comprehensive school.

== Academy ==
The school converted to an Ark academy for the 2007-08 academic year.

This school is split up into three sections named after notable local figures: Chaplin, Babbage and Seacole. The Chaplin and Babbage blocks are two separate halves of Key Stage 3. Key Stage 4 is known as Seacole.

The Ofsted report of July 2010 rated it as "Good, with outstanding capacity to improve".

== See also ==
- Southwark Schools' Learning Partnership
