= St Michael's Catholic College =

Location
- Llewellyn Street; Bermondsey, London, SE16 4UN; England
- Coordinates: 51.5000°N 0.0682°W

Information
- Type: Academy
- Motto: Vince in Bono Malum
- Religious affiliation: Roman Catholic
- Department for Education URN: 150937 Tables
- Ofsted: Reports
- Head Teacher: Felicity Corcoran
- Gender: Coeducational
- Age: 11 to 18
- Enrolment: 900
- Colour: Dark Grey
- Website: http://www.stmichaelscollege.org.uk/

St Michael's Catholic College is a coeducational secondary school with academy status, located in the London district of Southwark.

Specialising in Business and Enterprise and Modern Foreign Languages, St Michael's teaches students in the age range of 11–18 years.

The college joined the St Benedict Catholic Academy Trust Multi-academy trust in April 2024.

On the 29th of April 2025 Ofsted made the following key judgements following an inspection of the college.

- Quality of education - Outstanding
- Behaviour and attitudes - Outstanding
- Personal development - Outstanding
- Leadership and management - Outstanding
- Sixth form provision - Outstanding

The college was rebuilt in January 2011 under the BSF (Building Schools for Future) and opened a sixth form. A new teaching block was opened in September 2018 to allow the College to expand its capacity to a maximum of 1050 students by 2023.

In 2014 the school achieved examination results above the national average, and was rated "outstanding| by Ofsted in 2011 and 2013.

== Houses ==
St' Michaels Catholic College has six houses, named as follows.

- Saint John Bosco
- Saint Mary Mazzerello
- Saint Dominic Savio
- Blessed Laura Vicuña
- Blessed Michael Rua
- Blessed Alexandria Da costa

== Alumni ==
- Bejay Mulenga MBE (b. 1995) - entrepreneur, creative consultant and public speaker
