= Constance Briscoe =

English convict and former barrister

- Born: 18 May 1957 (age 69); England
- Citizenship: United Kingdom
- Education: Newcastle University; University of Warwick
- Occupations: Former barrister, former recorder of the Crown Court
- Partner(s): Adam Wilson (separated); Anthony Arlidge (separated)
- Children: 2
- Writing career
- Notable works: Ugly; Beyond Ugly

Constance Briscoe (born 18 May 1957 in England) is a former barrister, and was one of the first black female recorders in England and Wales. In May 2014, she was jailed for three counts of doing an act tending to pervert the course of justice in R v Huhne and Pryce. She was disbarred and removed from the judiciary.

== Legal career ==
Briscoe studied Law at Newcastle University and graduated with a 2:2, financing her studies with several casual jobs, including working in a hospice. She took an MA at the University of Warwick.

She was called to the bar in 1983. After pupillage with Michael Mansfield, she joined the chambers of Barbara Calvert. In 1996 she became an assistant recorder, a part-time judge. Briscoe practised in criminal law and fraud, principally defending. She also undertook tribunal work, public inquiries, inquests and acted as president of Mental Health Tribunals. A room was named after her in the Newcastle University Students' Union building, which was later renamed after her conviction. In 2007 she unsuccessfully applied to become a QC.

In October 2012 Briscoe was suspended from the judiciary after arrest and questioning by police.

On 6 August 2014, Briscoe was removed as a member of the judiciary. Her honorary degree of Doctor of Laws from the University of Wolverhampton awarded to her in 2011 was removed by the university's nominations committee in August 2014.

On 15 April 2016, Briscoe was disbarred as a barrister for three professional misconduct charges, which were: "engaging in conduct which was dishonest and discreditable to a barrister; engaging in conduct which was prejudicial to the administration of justice; and engaging in conduct which was likely to diminish public confidence in the legal profession, the administration of justice, or bring the profession into disrepute."

== Personal life ==
Briscoe's parents emigrated to the United Kingdom from Jamaica in the 1950s. Constance's mother Carmen had seven children, including Constance, by her husband George Briscoe. She then had another four children by Garfield Eastman. Constance attended Sacred Heart Catholic School, Camberwell.

Briscoe is known for her books Ugly (2006) and Beyond Ugly (2008), in which she claims she was verbally and physically abused by her mother and stepfather as a child. She underwent facial and other cosmetic surgery at university. She often spoke publicly about her experiences. Her mother, Carmen Briscoe-Mitchell, denies these claims and sued her daughter and her publishers Hodder & Stoughton for libel. The case was concluded in Briscoe's favour, when a jury in the High Court unanimously accepted her contention that her allegations were substantially true. Briscoe's mother stated that she wished to have this civil decision reversed in the light of Briscoe's later criminal conviction for perverting the course of justice. Police have confirmed she also faces criminal investigation in relation to the evidence supporting the civil judgment in her favour.

Briscoe has two children from a relationship with lawyer Adam Wilson. A later relationship with barrister Anthony Arlidge KC ended in 2010.

== Conviction ==
On 6 October 2012, Briscoe was arrested in Clapham and subsequently bailed pending further enquiries, as a result of a police investigation. No announcement was made at that time as to the nature of any allegations against her. The Lord Chief Justice and Lord Chancellor suspended Briscoe from the judiciary pending the outcome of the police investigation.

In February 2013, at the trial of Vicky Pryce, police stated that Briscoe's arrest related to the release of information to the press on behalf of Pryce contrary to statements Briscoe had made, and the police could not rely upon Briscoe as a "witness of truth". Pryce was a friend and neighbour of Briscoe. Briscoe was not charged but remained on police bail.

Prosecutor Andrew Edis told the jury that Briscoe and Pryce had "started it together by approaching a man called Andrew Alderson (a journalist working for the Mail on Sunday)", falsely claiming that one of Huhne's aides, Jo White, took points for him in 2003. According to Edis, Briscoe was a neighbour and friend of Pryce and that the "two of them appear to have cooked up a plan" to bring about Huhne's downfall.

On 12 June 2013, it was announced she would be charged with two counts of intending to pervert the course of justice and would attend court on 24 June 2013. The first count alleged that she provided police with two inaccurate statements, and the second alleged that she produced a copy of her witness statement that had been altered. On 1 May 2014, she was found guilty at the Old Bailey of three charges of attempting to pervert the course of justice, by lying to police, falsifying a witness statement, and providing a false document to an expert witness. On 2 May 2014, she was jailed for 16 months, she began her sentence at HM Prison Holloway.

Briscoe received an early release from prison in November 2014, before she had served half her sentence.

== Bibliography ==
- Briscoe, Constance. Ugly. London: Hodder & Stoughton, 2006. 310 pp.; 24 cm. ISBN 0-340-89597-7 (cased). ISBN 0-340-89598-5 (trade pbk).
- Briscoe, Constance. Beyond Ugly. London: Hodder & Stoughton, 2007. 239 pp.; 24 cm. ISBN 0-340-93323-2.
