= University Academy of Engineering South Bank =

Coordinates: 51.4885°N 0.0886°W

South Bank University Academy

Location
- Trafalgar Street; Walworth; London, SE17 2TP; England

Information
- Type: Academy
- Established: 2014
- Local authority: Southwark
- Trust: South Bank Academies
- Department for Education URN: 140221 Tables
- Ofsted: Reports
- Principal: Annette Moses
- Staff: 122
- Gender: Coeducational
- Age: 11 to 19
- Enrolment: 751
- Colours: Turquoise, black
- Website: https://www.southbankua.org.uk/

South Bank University Academy (formerly known as University Academy of Engineering South Bank) is a coeducational secondary school and sixth form located in the Walworth area of the London Borough of Southwark, England for students from Year 9 to Year 13.

It opened as an academy in 2014 and is part of South Bank Academies (sponsored by London South Bank University). It was re-founded as South Bank University Academy in 2021. The school is no longer specialist in engineering.

The school is part of the London South Bank University Group. The LSBU Group also includes its sister school, South Bank UTC, as well as London South Bank Technical College and Lambeth College.

A 2017 Ofsted report rated the school as "Good", with the school again rated "Good" in June 2022. In 2026, Ofsted reported the school as having the expected standard on 6 sections, and below on one section.

The school enrols 751 students, of which 70.9% are boys, 29.1% are girls . As of 2026, the school has 451 students from a 900 capacity. 55% of students receive free school meals, and around 9% are SEN

However, the school has faced scandals such as that of Julia Yeates who has been charged with child sexual abuse charges and sending nudes to students which means she is facing court again in the coming months. There has also been reports of sexual activity between teachers in the school building. The school protected Julia Yeates throughout which made children more at risk. The school therefore cannot be seen as being entirely proficient on safeguarding matters.
