= Charter School North Dulwich =

The Charter School North Dulwich

Location
- Red Post Hill; Dulwich; London, SE24 9JH; England
- 51.45641°N 0.08927°W

Information
- Type: Academy
- Established: 2000
- Department for Education URN: 136298 Tables
- Ofsted: Reports
- Head teacher: Mark Pain
- Gender: Coeducational
- Age: 11 to 18
- Enrolment: 1301
- Houses: Pankhurst, Frank, Seacole, Turing, Mandella, King
- Colours: Blue, Yellow and White
- Website: charternorthdulwich.org.uk

The Charter School North Dulwich is a co-educational secondary school and sixth form located in the Dulwich area of the London Borough of Southwark, England.

== Background ==
The Charter School was born out of a need for a good state secondary school for Dulwich, due in part to the high concentration of private schools in the area (James Allen's Girls' School, or JAGS; Alleyns; and Dulwich College).. The name of the school was taken from the "Parents Charter" introduced by the Government in 1991 to extend parental choice and raise standards.

The school is on Red Post Hill next to North Dulwich railway station and nearby Herne Hill. The site was formerly occupied by Dulwich High School for Boys, rebranded in 1999 from William Penn Secondary School. The old buildings were renovated and a sports hall and ball courts were constructed.

The Charter School opened in September 2000 with 180 students in Year 7. In 2016 The Charter School Trust opened another secondary school nearby named The Charter School East Dulwich. The Charter School was then renamed The Charter School North Dulwich.

The school has just over 1,250 pupils on its roll from Year 7 to Year 13.

== Head teachers ==
The inaugural head teacher was Pam Bowmaker OBE. She remained in post for five years, seeing the first cohort of pupils from the beginning of their secondary education through to the school's first set of GCSE results. She was succeeded by Chris Bowler in September 2005, who led the school to an Outstanding grading in its 2007 Ofsted inspection. Deputy head teacher David Sheppard became the third head teacher in September 2008; he improved behaviour at the school and led it to an Outstanding Ofsted award in 2008. Christian Hicks became head teacher in 2014 but now he is responsible for the overall running of the Charter School North Dulwich and its sister school the Charter School East Dulwich. Currently, the Charter School North Dulwich’s headteacher is Mark Pain, who recently overtook the lead of this academic and educational institution.
