= R v Huhne =

British court case

Regina v Huhne and Pryce
- Court: Crown Court
- Full case name: Regina v Christopher Huhne and Vasiliki Pryce

Case history
- Related action: The Queen (on the application of Times Newspapers Limited) v the Crown Court at Chelmsford

Court membership
- Judge sitting: The Honourable Mr Justice Sweeney

Regina v Christopher Huhne and Vasiliki Pryce (Note: These are the names as they appear on the indictment, no. T20127076) is the prosecution of the former British Secretary of State for Energy and Climate Change, Chris Huhne MP, and his former wife, Vicky Pryce, the former Head of the Government Economic Service, for perverting the course of justice, contrary to common law. Huhne became the first Cabinet minister in British history to resign as a consequence of criminal proceedings. On 4 February 2013, Huhne was convicted after changing his plea to guilty. The trial of Pryce began on the following day, lasting until 20 February 2013 when the jury were discharged by the judge. A re-trial began on 25 February 2013 and led to the conviction of Pryce on 7 March 2013.

== Background ==
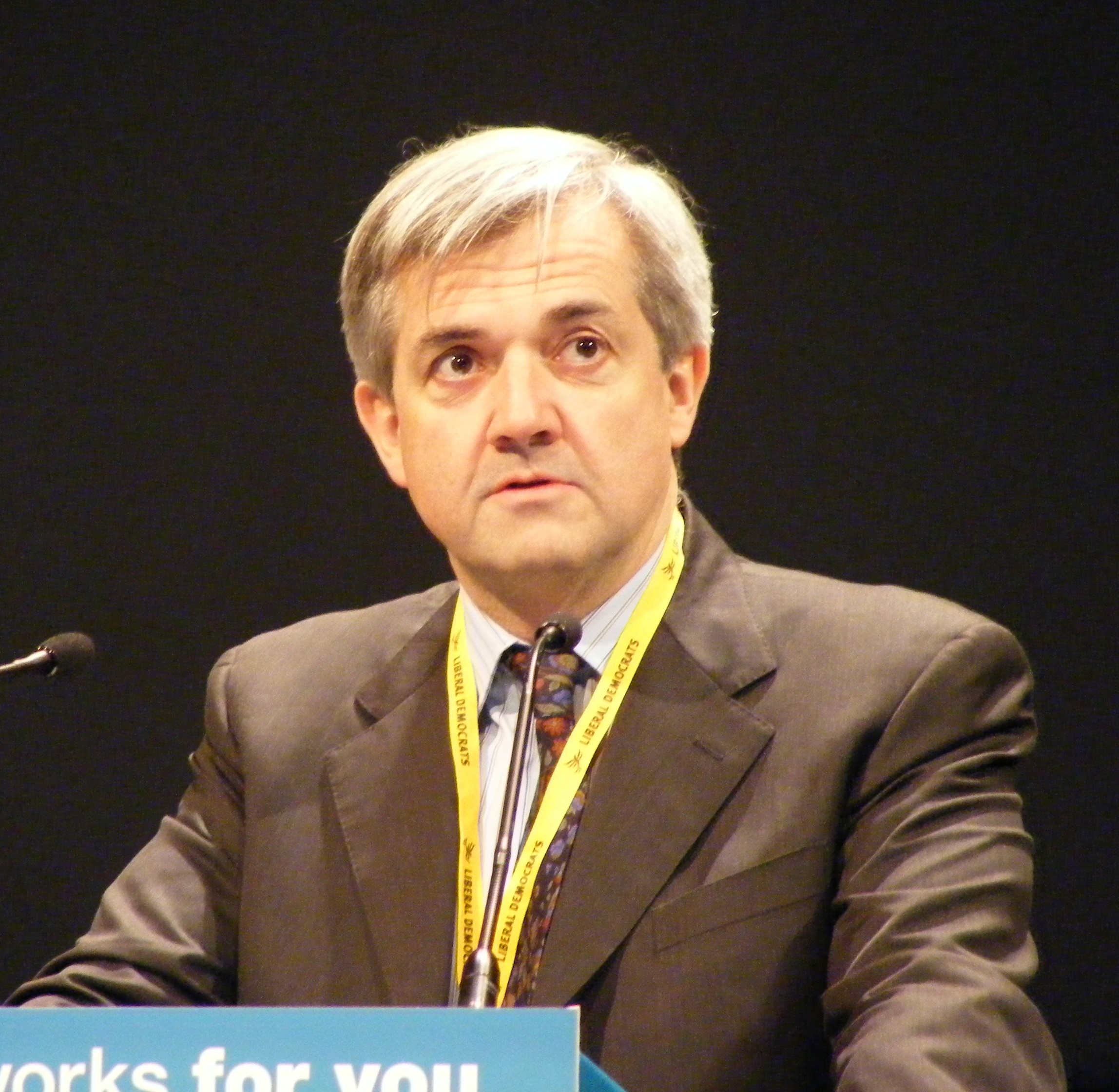
Huhne, speaking in 2010

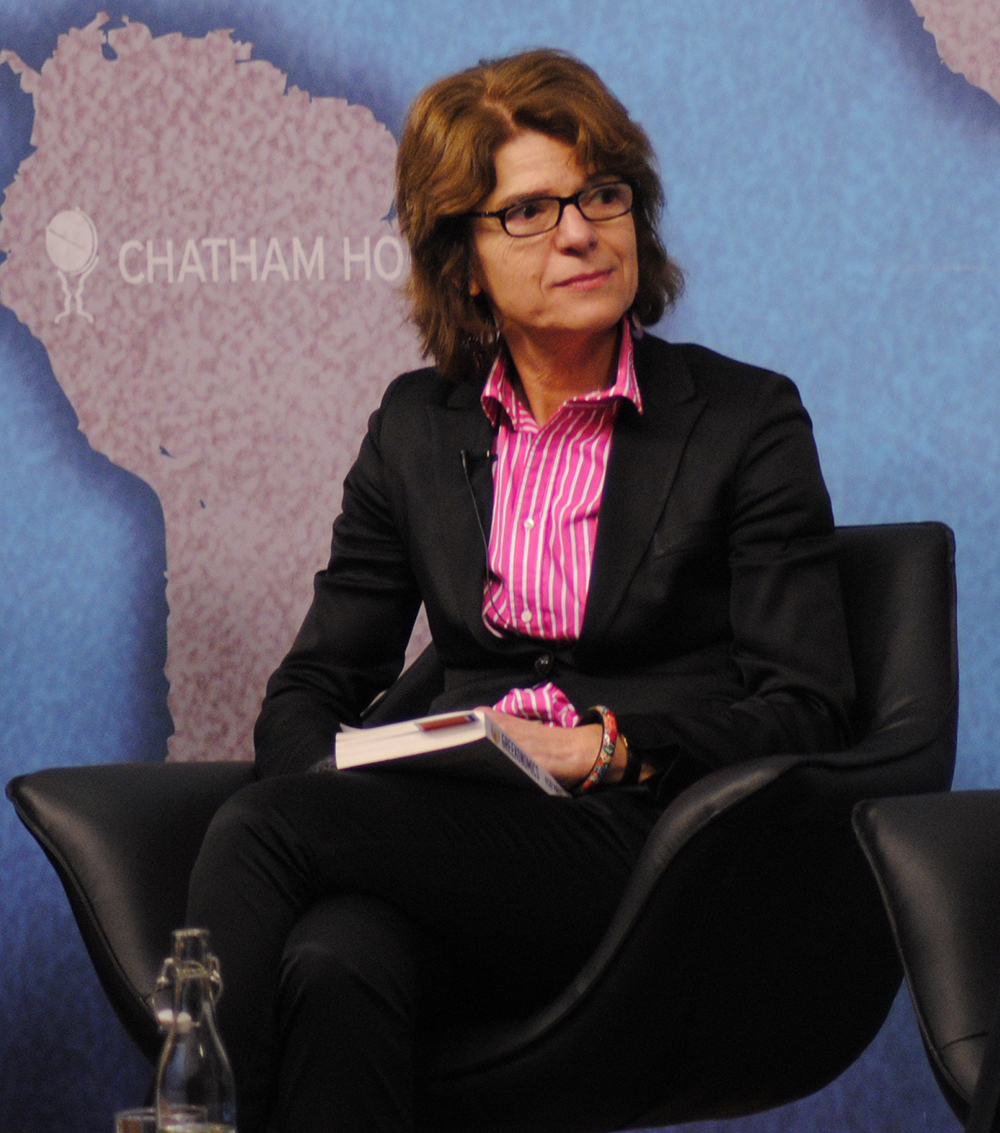
Vicky Pryce at Chatham House in 2012

Huhne had been the Liberal Democrat MP for Eastleigh since 2005. On 12 May 2010 he was appointed to the cabinet office of Secretary of State for Energy and Climate Change under the Conservative-Liberal Democrat coalition formed following the 2010 general election. In June 2010, Huhne announced that he was leaving his wife of 26 years. The couple divorced in January 2011.

In May 2011, Pryce stated that she was aware that Huhne had "pressured people to take his driving licence penalty points". Huhne emphatically denied these allegations. They amounted to the serious criminal offence of perverting the course of justice, contrary to common law. Labour MP Simon Danczuk made a criminal complaint to Essex Police in respect of the allegations. The main allegation was that Huhne had evaded his own penalty points by causing Pryce dishonestly to accept three penalty points which he had incurred while driving his BMW car through a speed camera between Stansted Airport and London on the evening of 12 March 2003. During interviews with Essex Police, Huhne exercised his right to remain silent. A decision whether to institute proceedings for the alleged offences was delayed for eight months while The Sunday Times made an application for judicial review of an order of the Crown Court at Chelmsford that the Crown Prosecution Service had obtained, which obliged the newspaper to disclose e-mails between Pryce and its political editor, Isabel Oakeshott, in which the case was discussed. The application was withdrawn on 20 January 2012. In December 2011, newspapers reported that Essex Police had recommended to the CPS that both Huhne and Pryce be prosecuted for the alleged offences.

== Criminal proceedings ==
=== Preliminary hearings ===
On 3 February 2012, the Director of Public Prosecutions, Keir Starmer QC announced that there was sufficient evidence to bring charges against Huhne and Pryce. Huhne immediately resigned as Secretary of State for Energy and Climate Change, becoming the first cabinet minister in British history to resign as a result of criminal proceedings. The pair were summoned to appear at Westminster Magistrates' Court on 16 February 2012, at which (by right) neither defendant indicated a plea. They were each granted unconditional bail. The case was sent for trial at the Crown Court at Southwark, and an initial hearing was fixed for 2 March 2012.

The charge against Huhne was that:

Between 21 March 2003 and 21 May 2003, [he] ... intended to pervert the course of public justice, by doing an act in that he, during the course of an investigation into an offence of driving a vehicle in excess speed, ... submitted information to the investigation officer that Vicky Pryce had been the driver, enabling her to admit responsibility for the offence and causing her licence to be endorsed with three penalty points.

The charge against Pryce was that:

Between 12 March 2003 and 21 May 2003, [she] ... intended to pervert the course of justice by committing an act during the course of an investigation into an offence of driving a vehicle in excess speed, [in which she] submitted information to the investigating authorities that ... [she was] the driver of the vehicle, causing ... [her] licence to be endorsed with three penalty points.

=== Crown Court ===
On 2 March 2012, Mr Justice Saunders scheduled a trial for two weeks in October 2012, and extended the defendants' unconditional bail until a plea and case management hearing, which was held on 1 June 2012 at the Crown Court at Southwark before Mr Justice Saunders. At the hearing Pryce entered a plea of not guilty, on the basis that she acted under the marital coercion of Huhne. Huhne did not enter a plea, and his arraignment was adjourned pending the determination of an application to have the indictment quashed. The defendants' unconditional bail was extended until the opening of the trial, scheduled for 2 October 2012. A series of hearings during the week beginning 1 October 2012 took place at the Crown Court at Southwark before Mr Justice Sweeney. An order was made under the Contempt of Court Act 1981, restricting what could be reported. On 5 October 2012, the trial was adjourned until 14 January 2013 for legal reasons, which were not disclosed. A further pre-trial hearing was held at the Crown Court at Reading on 3 December 2012. On 28 January 2013, Huhne's applications to dismiss the charges against him for lack of evidence and to stay the indictment as an abuse of the process of the court were refused by Mr Justice Sweeney, who ruled that there was a case to answer. Huhne was arraigned and pleaded "not guilty" to the indictment. A new trial date was set down for 4 February 2013.

The trial judge was again Mr Justice Sweeney. Counsel for Crown was Andrew Edis QC. Huhne's counsel was John Kelsey-Fry QC, while Pryce was advised by solicitor Robert Brown and counsel in the case was Julian Knowles QC.

At the hearing on 4 February 2013 at the Crown Court at Southwark, Huhne pleaded guilty on re-arraignment, and subsequently announced that he would resign as an MP by taking the appointment of the Chiltern Hundreds. He also resigned from the Privy Council losing the style "The Right Honourable". He was remanded on unconditional bail until his sentencing. The trial of Pryce for perverting the course of justice began on 5 February 2013. She admitted taking Huhne's penalty points in evidence, but claimed that she had been coerced into doing so by her former husband.

On 20 February 2013, after the jury was unable to reach a verdict, the judge discharged the jury and ordered a retrial for Pryce. Previously, the jury had asked questions of the judge, including clarifications of "reasonable doubt" and whether they were permitted to come to a verdict "based on a reason that was not presented in court". The judge commented that the jury had an "absolutely fundamental deficit in understanding". The retrial ended on 7 March with Pryce's conviction by a unanimous jury, and sentencing was adjourned.

In February 2013, at the trial of Vicky Pryce it was revealed that barrister and part-time recorder Constance Briscoe had been arrested in relation to statements she had made to police that she had not had any involvement with the leaking of the driving licence points-swapping story. Briscoe was arrested on 6 October 2012 as a result of a police investigation. No announcement had been made at that time as to the nature of the allegations against her. Prosecutor Andrew Edis told the jury that Briscoe and Pryce had "started it together by approaching a man called Andrew Alderson (a journalist working for the Mail on Sunday)", falsely claiming that one of Huhne's aides, Jo White, took points for him in 2003. According to Edis, Briscoe was a neighbour and friend of Pryce and that the "two of them appear to have cooked up a plan" to bring about Huhne's downfall. On 1 May 2014, Briscoe was found guilty at the Old Bailey of three charges of attempting to pervert the course of justice, by lying to police, falsifying a witness statement, and providing a false document to an expert witness. On 2 May 2014, she was jailed for 16 months.

On 11 March 2013, Huhne and Pryce were each jailed for eight months.

In January 2014, the government announced the defence of marital coercion would be abolished, which was done in May of that year.

=== Release ===
Huhne and Pryce were both released from prison on 13 May 2013 subject to electronic tagging. Huhne is working in sustainable energy. Pryce has written a book based on her prison experience entitled Prisonomics, analysing women's prisons from the economic point of view. Royalties will be donated to Working Chance, a charity helping former women prisoners find work.

== Notes and references ==
Notes
