= Devilling =

Training period for aspiring advocates in British and Irish law

Devilling is the custom of more senior self employed barristers/advocates making use of their junior’s services to complete briefs belonging to the more senior barrister/advocate, usually without the knowledge of the attorney. Not to be confused with the period of training called pupillage or junior work undertaken by a person wishing to become an advocate in one of the English-speaking common law systems of the United Kingdom, Ireland, Hong Kong, and Australia.

Devilling cannot be done by a pupil and has to be done by a junior barrister/advocate, as it is paid work usually at a rate lower than the normal fee of the junior.

== Etymology ==
While there is currently no consensus on the origin of the term, it likely was borrowed from the existing phrase 'printer's devil', (or printer's apprentice) the origin of which is also in dispute. One possible explanation is that, in the earliest stages of moveable type, most if not all printings were of bibles and biblical passages. When an error occurred with the new and complex technology, the mistake would be blamed on the Devil. As the profession grew, young apprentices were equally easy to blame, and thus became the replacement scapegoat for any errors.

== Scotland ==
The prospective advocate is placed under the care of a devilmaster, who traditionally must not be a King's Counsel. The pupil follows a programme of training as laid down by the Faculty of Advocates.

The process has an ancient heritage, as it is the legal right of the Faculty of Advocates to admit persons as advocates to the Courts of Scotland. This right was apparently granted by the College of Justice.

== Ireland ==
Devilling is a period of training undertaken by barristers in Ireland where they work under a more senior barrister (one who has been called for seven or more years but who is not a senior counsel) who is called their master. A barrister is called to the bar after successfully completing the course of barrister-at-law in the King's Inns, but during their first year of practice, they must devil for one year. It is common for barristers to also devil during their second year of practice.

The work is generally unpaid and there is no obligation on the master to cover the costs of the devil. A barrister who has not devilled cannot practice Irish law in Ireland, but may still be recognised as fully qualified by the bar associations of other EEA member states, and practise in those member states in accordance with the relevant European Union (EU) directives.

== England and Wales ==
The term is used in the English legal system to refer to a junior barrister undertaking paid written work on behalf of a more senior barrister. The instructing solicitor is not informed of the arrangement and the junior barrister is paid by the senior barrister out of his own fee as a private arrangement between the two. This is one of the exceptions to the usual prohibition on fee sharing under the Code of Conduct for Barristers in England and Wales.

== Australia ==
Australia has a devilling process similar to that of the UK, with only nine months of apprenticeship required for new advocates. Additionally, the Bar Association of Australia requires devils be paid, with the official recommendation 50% of the barrister's fees.

== Treasury Devil ==
"Treasury Devil" is the colloquial term for the First Junior Treasury Counsel (Common Law), a private practitioner barrister who represents His Majesty's Government in the civil courts, instructed by the Treasury Solicitor. It was a tradition that the Treasury Devil was made a High Court Judge after the end of his term in office. There is no current Treasury Devil: Philip Sales (now Lord Sales), the last Treasury Devil, was appointed Queen's Counsel while serving in the role, and so ceased to be Junior Treasury Counsel and "Devil", and became First Treasury Counsel (Common Law). The incumbent in the role, James Eadie, was appointed in 2009 when he was already a QC, and so also holds the position of First Treasury Counsel (Common Law).

Treasury Counsel (Common Law) should not be confused with the criminal barristers appointed to the Treasury Counsel team who are responsible for prosecuting the most serious criminal cases. The team is headed by the "First Senior Treasury Counsel (Criminal)" and is composed of ten senior and seven junior Treasury Counsel. Treasury Counsel (Criminal) are so-named because historically they were also instructed by the Treasury Solicitor (who in earlier times was also Director of Public Prosecutions), although criminal prosecution is now overseen by the independent Crown Prosecution Service.

=== List of Treasury Devils ===
As Junior Counsel to the Treasury (Common Law):

- 1848–1864: William Newland Welsby
- 1864–1868: James Hannen
- 1868–1872: Thomas Dickson Archibald
- 1872–1879: Charles S. C. Bowen
- 1879–1883: A. L. Smith
- 1883–1890: R. S. Wright
- 1890–1905: Henry Sutton
- 1905–1912: Sidney A. T. Rowlatt
- 1912–1921: George A. H. Branson
- 1921–1930: Henry Martley Giveen
- 1930–1935: Wilfrid Lewis
- 1935–1945: Valentine Holmes
- 1945–1950: Hubert Parker
- 1950–1954: John Ashworth
- 1954–1959: Rodger Winn
- 1959–1964: Roualeyn Cumming-Bruce
- 1964–1968: Nigel Bridge

As First Junior Treasury Counsel (Common Law):

- 1968–1974: Gordon Slynn
- 1974–1979: Harry Woolf
- 1979–1984: Simon D. Brown
- 1984–1992: John Laws
- 1992–1997: Stephen Richards
- 1997–2006: Philip Sales

As First Treasury Counsel (Common Law):

- 2006–2008: Philip Sales QC
- 2009–present: Sir James Eadie; the first QC appointed directly to the position

== See also ==
- Pupillage
- Training contract
- Printer's devil
- Articling
