= Chroma (ballet) =

Ballet created by Wayne McGregor

- Choreographer: Wayne McGregor
- Music: Joby Talbot; The White Stripes
- Premiere: 17 November 2006; Royal Opera House
- Original ballet company: The Royal Ballet
- Design: John Pawson (sets); Moritz Junge (costumes)
- Genre: Contemporary ballet

Chroma is a one-act contemporary ballet created by Wayne McGregor for the Royal Ballet. The work received its premiere at the Royal Opera House, Covent Garden, on 17 November 2006. The ballet is performed to a combination of original music by Joby Talbot and arrangements of music by the White Stripes, with orchestrations by Christopher Austin. The ballet was a great success, winning a number of awards, including the Laurence Olivier Award for Best New Dance Production, and led to The Royal Ballet appointing McGregor as resident choreographer.

== Production ==
External videos
- Wayne McGregor's Chroma – The Hardest Button to Button (The Royal Ballet), YouTube video

Chroma marks the second time Wayne McGregor choreographed for the Royal Opera House main stage, having previously created works for the Royal Opera House's Linbury Studio Theatre. According to McGregor, it was created within three weeks, with four to five hours of rehearsals each day. The ballet is performed by ten dancers; some of the original cast members went on to be McGregor's frequent collaborators, such as Edward Watson, Steven McRae and Eric Underwood. The original cast also featured several Royal Ballet lead dancers, some of whom were working with McGregor for the first time. The female dancers are completely off pointe.

The music includes four pieces by British composer Joby Talbot, as well as Talbot's rearrangement of three songs by the American rock band White Stripes, including "Aluminum", "The Hardest Button to Button", and "Blue Orchid". The set was designed by British architect John Pawson, who was known for his minimalist style. Pawson was brought in after he was approached by McGregor to create "amazing plain canvases in which anything can happen". Chroma was the first time Pawson designed for a stage.

The choreography, design, and music received critical acclaim, with The Times noting: "McGregor’s Chroma is ravishing on all fronts", and The Guardian writing that the ballet's "tension between chaos and minimalism is extreme". The success of Chroma led to McGregor's appointment as resident choreographer of the Royal Ballet, a position that was previously held by Frederick Ashton and Kenneth MacMillan, thus making him the first contemporary artist and the only one without any ballet training to hold the post.

The Royal Ballet has since revived Chroma and it has been performed on tour. Other ballet companies that have danced the piece include the National Ballet of Canada (2010), San Francisco Ballet (2011), Bolshoi Ballet (2011), and The Australian Ballet (2014). In 2013, Alvin Ailey American Dance Theater became the first modern dance troupe to perform Chroma. In 2016, on the 10th anniversary of the premiere, the Royal Ballet performed Chroma alongside five dancers from the Alvin Ailey American Dance Theater, including Jacqueline Green, Jamar Roberts and Rachael McLaren.

== Casts ==
- World premiere (2006): Federico Bonelli, Alina Cojocaru, Lauren Cuthbertson, Sarah Lamb, Steven McRae, Ludovic Ondiviela, Tamara Rojo, Eric Underwood, Edward Watson, Jonathan Watkins
- Royal Ballet DVD: Federico Bonelli, Ricardo Cervera, Tamara Rojo, Mara Galeazzi, Sarah Lamb, Steven McRae, Laura Morera, Ludovic Ondiviela, Eric Underwood, Jonathan Watkins, Edward Watson
- National Ballet of Canada premiere (2010): Aleksandar Antonijevic, Greta Hodgkinson, Tanya Howard, Zdenek Konvalina, Noah Long, Tina Pereira, Brendan Saye, Robert Stephen, Dylan Tedaldi, Bridgett Zehr
- San Francisco Ballet premiere (2011): Frances Chung, Taras Domitro, Jaime Garcia Castilla, Dana Genshaft, Isaac Hernández, Maria Kochetkova, Pascal Molat, Garen Scribner, Anthony Spaulding, Yuan Yuan Tan
- Bolshoi Ballet premiere (2011): Ekaterina Krysanova, Svetlana Lunkina, Viktoria Litvinova, Ekaterina Shipulina, Yan Godovsky, Vladislav Lantratov, Vyacheslav Lopatin, Artem Ovcharenko, Maksim Surov, Igor Tsvirko
- The Australian Ballet premiere (2014): Adam Bull, Juliet Burnett, Brett Chynoweth, Daniel Gaudiello, Lana Jones, Andrew Killian, Christopher Rodgers-Wilson, Amber Scott, Leanne Stojmenov, Vivienne Wong
- 10th anniversary revival (2016): Federico Bonelli, Jeroboam Bozeman, Lauren Cuthbertson, Jacqueline Green, Sarah Lamb, Yannick Lebrun, Rachael McLaren, Steven McRae, Calvin Richardson, Jamar Roberts

== Videography ==
In 2011, Opus Arte released a DVD of a performance of Chroma by The Royal Ballet, along with McGregor's Infra and Limen.

In 2015, a performance by Alvin Ailey American Dance Theater at Lincoln Center, along with three other pieces, was filmed as a part of Lincoln Center at the Movies: Great American Dance, which was screened in various cinemas and was released in a DVD. The Lincoln Center released the video online in light of the impact of the COVID-19 coronavirus pandemic on the performing arts.

== Awards and nominations ==
Year	Award	Work	Result	Ref.
2007	Critics' Circle National Dance Awards – Best Choreography (Classical)	Chroma	Won	
2007	Laurence Olivier Award for Best New Dance Production	Chroma	Won	
2007	Laurence Olivier Award for Outstanding Achievement in Dance	Wayne McGregor	Nominated	
2007	Laurence Olivier Award for Outstanding Achievement in Dance	Steven McRae (Note: Steven McRae was nominated for both Chroma and Homage to the Queen)	Nominated	
2007	South Bank Show Awards – Dance	Chroma	Won	
