= James Earl Reid =

American artist and sculptor (1942–2021)

- Born: September 9, 1942; Princeton, North Carolina, U.S.
- Died: July 18, 2021 (aged 78); Baltimore, Maryland, U.S.
- Occupation: Sculptor
- Works: Statue of Billie Holiday (1979); Third World America (1985)

James Earl Reid (September 9, 1942 – July 18, 2021) was an American sculptor. Reid was best known for the statue of Billie Holiday in Baltimore, Maryland, and for the sculpture Third World America that was at the center of the 1989 U.S. Supreme Court case Community for Creative Non-Violence v. Reid.

Reid was born September 9, 1942, in Princeton, North Carolina. He attended Southern High School in Baltimore, and after graduation, attended the Maryland Institute College of Art on scholarship. He went on to obtain an M.A. degree in sculpture from the University of Maryland, College Park in 1970. After graduation, he joined the university as an assistant professor, and later taught at Spelman College, Atlanta University, Morgan State University, Goucher College and the Baltimore School for the Arts.

In 1979, Reid began the design for the statue of Billie Holiday, eventually unveiled in 1985.

In the 1980s, one of his sculptures, Third World America, became embroiled in Community for Creative Non-Violence v. Reid, a 1989 U.S. Supreme Court case about the U.S. copyright law's work made for hire doctrine. The court held in that case that Reid was an independent contractor, not an employee, of the Community for Creative Non-Violence (CCNV), who had commissioned the Third World America sculpture, but stopped short of awarding Reid sole ownership, instead remanding the case for further consideration of whether the sculpture was a work of joint authorship. The parties went to mediation and settled, with CCNV taking sole ownership of the actual sculpture itself, but Reid being declared the sole author and owner of its copyright. Under the terms of the settlement, both parties had the right to make two-dimensional reproductions, and Reid retained the sole right to make three-dimensional reproductions; each party kept whatever income was derived from its reproductions.

Reid died from congestive heart failure on July 17, 2021, at Harbor Hospital in Baltimore; he was 78.
