= List of Tweenies episodes =

This is a list of Tweenies episodes. Tweenies is a television programme aimed at young children, formerly broadcast on the BBC's CBBC strand from 1999 until 2002, then the CBeebies channel from 11 February 2002 until 1 April 2016. It stopped airing after 1 April 2016.

== Series overview ==
Series	Episodes	Originally released	
Series	Episodes	First released	Last released
1	85	6 September 1999	31 December 1999
2	45	31 January 2000	31 March 2000
3	30	24 July 2000	1 September 2000
4	40	9 October 2000	1 December 2000
5	60 + Special	18 December 2000	9 April 2001
6	130	24 September 2001	24 April 2002

== Episodes ==
=== Series 1 (1999) ===
No. overall	No. in series	Title	Original release date
1	1	"Tweenie Band"	6 September 1999
The Tweenies get excited about singing Music Man in which they play imaginary instruments. Milo gets carried away with a drum, and Jake with a pot lid, and they make a dreadful noise. Judy takes control and encourages them to give a Top of the Pops-style performance.
2	2	"Spider"	7 September 1999
Jake is scared of spiders, so Max shows him a film and makes him his own spider model. Soon he feels confident enough to join the others in the garden for a spider hunt.
3	3	"I Am Me"	8 September 1999
The Tweenies notice how different Doodles is compared to them, and that they all seem to be the same as each other. They decide to play different games: Jake plays with a wheelbarrow, Milo plays with a remote control car, Fizz paints a picture and Bella plays dress up, but everything goes wrong. Bella bullies Jake for taking her crown and calls him a baby and calls his wheelbarrow silly. Fizz gets upset when Milo ruins her painting with his car and she calls it silly. Judy helps everyone out by showing them a video of a school and reads a story called Parcel for Stanley.
4	4	"Old House"	9 September 1999
Jake, Fizz and Max explore an old house which is now a museum. Jake decides he is the Grand Old Duke of York and insists that the three of them must go up and down any hill that they come across. At the old house, they have great fun exploring the way people lived, worked and enjoyed themselves in olden times. Note: This is the first appearance of "Take a Trip with the Tweenies".
5	5	"I'm Scared"	10 September 1999
Jake notices that the curtains of the Surprise Area are twitching and he and the other Tweenies think that there is a monster behind them. None of them will go and have a look as they are all too scared. The Tweenies admit to Judy that they are scared of what might be there. Judy seems to know what it is and encourages them to go and have a look. When they do, they are glad that they did.
6	6	"Wriggling Fingers"	13 September 1999
The Tweenies sing two of their favourite songs - Put Your Finger in the Air, and Tommy Thumb – and it sets them thinking about what they can do with their fingers. They use their hands to make shadow animals while they sing more of their favourite songs. Then they make puppets from gloves and bits and pieces from the messy area, and this leads to a black theatre puppet show narrated by the very able Bella.
7	7	"Mermaids"	14 September 1999
The Tweenies discover that someone who is half fish and half person is called a mermaid. Fizz and Bella get very excited about this and decide that they should become mermaids. They find what they need in the dressing up box, and together with Milo and Jake, they explore and sing about these wondrous creatures. Mermaids may not be real, but they are fun.
8	8	"Ballet"	15 September 1999
Fizz goes to ballet class every Saturday and wants to share the joy of a ballet lesson with all the other Tweenies. She shows the rest of the gang a video of ballet, until things go wrong. Bella takes over the class, making Fizz very angry. Jake can't keep up because he's only little, while Milo is doing silly things She has difficulties getting Jake to do it properly, keeping Milo in order and stopping Bella from taking over but her enthusiasm wins out and with the help of the dressing up box, a new headdress she made herself and a story from Max about a ballet class, they are able to perform a little ballet for Max at the end.
9	9	"I've Lost My Train"	16 September 1999
Jake cannot find his toy train. Milo is too busy playing, but Bella and Fizz help him look for it. They look behind and under many things, but there is no sign of it. Milo has an idea, and the Tweenies make a runaway train out of cardboard boxes. It's a great hit with Jake, but they decide to have one last look for the toy train. Eventually, Doodles finds it.
10	10	"Pebbles"	17 September 1999
Max is trying to make the garden look a bit more interesting and he remembers a beach that has millions of pebbles. Judy, Milo and Bella go off to see this beach and they discover the different shapes, sizes and colours of the stones that you can find. They also find many different things you can do with stones and pebbles from the beach, and the fun you can have with them.
11	11	"Telephone"	20 September 1999
The Tweenies have all sorts of notions as to how a telephone works. Is there someone inside it? What makes it ring? Do you speak into it or at it? They experiment with the way things travel down tubes, and what happens to your voice if you speak into one end of a very long tube. The Tweenies soon understand the fact that a telephone allows you to speak to someone who is not in the same place as you, but somewhere else.
12	12	"I'm Too Small"	21 September 1999
Jake is having difficulty keeping up with the others. When he tries to join in with their game, he is told that he is too small. Jake goes to confide to Doodles and realises that although he is smaller than the rest, he has grown and can do lots more things than he used to be able to do. Judy tries to help the others understand how Jake is feeling and then they decide to play something they can all join in.
13	13	"Rockpool"	22 September 1999
Fizz and Milo are off to the beach with Max to try and find a starfish. On their trip, they find rockpools and discover the creatures that live in them. Fizz does not understand how a star can be in the sky and then in the sea. The seaside teaches them about the fauna found in rockpools and enables them to finish a pretend rockpool Jake and Bella have made in the playroom.
14	14	"It Wasn't Me"	23 September 1999
Max brings a marionette puppet to show the Tweenies and they decide to do their own puppet show. Bella wants to play with the marionette, but Max tells her to be careful with it. But she plays with the puppet and breaks it. She lies to Max, telling him that Doodles broke it. Eventually, Bella tells Max the truth and he is sad because Bella told a lie, but now she knows that it's always better to tell the truth.
15	15	"Noise and Quiet"	24 September 1999
Milo is in a noisy mood. He has found an instrument that he calls his rattler, and goes around each person playing it, making lots of noise. Then Max comes up with a plan.
16	16	"Bad Mood"	27 September 1999
Milo is tired after his cousin Johnny stayed with him and he is in a bad mood. He tells Fizz and Bella to go away. Judy cheers Milo up with a story called When Mum Turned into a Monster, then he apologises for being in a bad mood.
17	17	"Ball"	28 September 1999
After an accident in the playroom, it is decided that the park is the place to play with balls. Milo, Bella and Max go off to the park to play. They have a look at various parts of the park before they are sure that it is the right place to play with a ball. Back in the Playroom, Judy is showing Fizz and Jake how to play skittles with a ball which is the right size for indoors. All the Tweenies discover that you can have fun with a ball anywhere.
18	18	"Colours"	29 September 1999
Jake has arrived with his 'Dot Man' superhero cape on. When his mum made it for him, she sewed on many coloured dots and this gave Dotman the power to put back any colours that disappear from the world. This is exactly what happens. All the colours suddenly disappear from the garden and Dot Man is the only person who can bring them back. Dot Man saves all the colours and even sorts out Doodles' colour problem.
19	19	"Over and Under"	30 September 1999
The Tweenies watch a gymnast on a bar and Milo invents a game, swinging over and under a bar, then the others join him in an adventure with a friendly bear and learn what the words 'over' and 'under' mean.
20	20	"Rainbow Magic"	1 October 1999
Fizz catches sight of a rainbow when she is in the garden and thinks how magical it is. She tries to describe how colourful it was, but the others want to see one for themselves. Judy helps out by getting them to watch some on video and to take note of the many colours that are in a rainbow. They then make their own rainbow with all the colours they can remember and put it up above the window, but will they all see a real rainbow?
21	21	"Dragon"	4 October 1999
Milo finds himself in possession of an unusual dragon. Bella keeps saying to Milo there's no such thing as a dragon until he meets one that has a cold.
22	22	"Modelling Clay"	5 October 1999
Judy arrives with a tub of modelling clay and the Tweenies discover that the wibbly-wobbly material can be shaped and squeezed into all sorts of things, such as a horse, a rocket and a castle. Unfortunately, their beautiful models disappear while Judy is telling the story of the Gingerbread Man. Max has the answer to the mystery of the vanishing clay, and the Tweenies work together to make one more wibbly-wobbly creation.
23	23	"Lost Frog"	6 October 1999
The gang try to find a home for a lost frog called Norman.
24	24	"Stuck Together"	7 October 1999
The Tweenies are stuck together. Jake gets stuck to a button hole in his jacket. Milo tries to free Jake, but he gets stuck to a button hole. When Bella plays with some glue, she gets stuck to Milo's arm. Fizz ties her and Bella's shoelaces together. Luckily, Max comes to the rescue.
25	25	"Growing Bulbs"	8 October 1999
Jake produces some funny looking objects which turn out to be daffodil bulbs. The friends plant the bulbs and make paper plants for the empty pots.
26	26	"Shiny Metal"	11 October 1999
Using his magic polish, Max shows the Tweenies how to make dull old metal sparkle and shine. The Tweenies find many metal objects, and with a little help from Bella's fairy wand, fill the room with shiny metal.
27	27	"Big and Small"	12 October 1999
The friends learn about size by comparing ants with elephants, then hear some stories about large and small animals.
28	28	"Birthday"	13 October 1999
Milo, Bella and Jake notice Fizz isn't here to sing with them, until Max tells them she's gone out with Judy and Doodles to buy a birthday present as they find out it's Fizz's birthday. So the gang organise a birthday party for her, but Bella realises they forgot the cake, until they notice someone made one next door for Fizz and she has a lovely birthday party.
29	29	"Sheets"	14 October 1999
Max is trying to decide where to go on holiday, so, using their imaginations, the other Tweenies take him to sunny beaches and snowy mountains.
30	30	"Sand"	15 October 1999
While building sandcastles, Milo and Jake discover that sand is a good place for hiding treasures and decide to go on a hunt.
31	31	"Animal Dancers"	18 October 1999
The Tweenies make some costumes so they can dress up as animals and perform a show. Note: The ballet the Tweenies watch is The Tales of Beatrix Potter.
32	32	"Police"	19 October 1999
Bella finds a lost brooch. Max takes Bella and Milo to the local police station to hand it in. Down at the station, Bella and Milo join the police on their rounds. Milo does not catch any burglars, but they do reunite a lost child with his mum.
33	33	"Printing"	20 October 1999
Judy is trying to decorate the Surprise Area, but is having great difficulty in finding a colour that looks just right, whilst Max shows the gang how to print a decorative fairy border using various shapes and different colours.
34	34	"Rolling"	21 October 1999
Milo has lost the wheel of his fire engine, while searching for it, the other Tweenies find many things that roll.
35	35	"Rainy Day"	22 October 1999
The rain spoils the Tweenies' plans for a visit to the farm, so instead they make their own rainy day collage and dive right in.
36	36	"Cardboard Box"	25 October 1999
The Tweenies are bored with their toys, so Max suggests that they play with the cardboard boxes he has left in the garden. At first, they are unimpressed, but soon the Tweenies realise that a box can be anything they want it to be. Soon they have created a cardboard box train which takes them to space, under the sea and into the jungle.
37	37	"Caring for a Pet"	26 October 1999
Judy shows the Tweenies a video about how to care for a pet. However, they leave before seeing the bit about how to care for a dog (except Jake) and decide to look after Doodles their own way. They dress him in a nappy and a shirt, and Milo keeps trying to feed him a sandwich. Eventually, Max shows them the proper ways to care for a dog on the TV.
38	38	"Woolly Sweater"	27 October 1999
Milo cannot wait to show off his new sweater his gran has knitted for him, but Doodles and Jake's horseplay leaves it a great deal shorter when it unravels.
39	39	"Fairies"	28 October 1999
Max helps Bella make a pair of wings and a wand. Then he tells the story of Sleeping Beauty and the Tweenies do some acting!
40	40	"Canal Boat"	29 October 1999
Fizz, Jake and Max go for a ride on a narrowboat that belongs to an old friend of Max's and go in search of unusual boats that Fizz has seen on the canal near where she lives.
41	41	"Hot and Cold"	1 November 1999
While the snow falls, the Tweenies learn about icebergs and volcanoes to find out the difference between hot and cold, and then Bella meets Mr Hot and Mrs Cold who sing a song to help explain the difference.
42	42	"Hiccups"	2 November 1999
Rushing in, arriving late, Milo gets the hiccups! Bella, Fizz and Jake try to help him stop them – even Doodles has a go! But what are hiccups? Why do they come? Where do they go? Milo tries to find out.
43	43	"Go Away Bella!"	3 November 1999
No matter where Bella goes or what she does, she always seems to ruin things for everyone. She tries to help Jake build a wall. She wants to make a different one, but Jake doesn't want her to. She ruins Fizz's hats, and she throws Milo's stepping stones, which makes him angry. Jake, Fizz and Milo tell Bella to go away. Max angrily tells Bella to go and do something else, then Doodles helps out.
44	44	"Meadow"	4 November 1999
Jake becomes Little Boy Blue and falls asleep. Meanwhile, Max becomes a roving reporter and visits a meadow with his camcorder and then gets ants in his pants!
45	45	"Blow"	5 November 1999
Jake wants to know whether windmills are magic, or operated by the wind. So Jake, Fizz, Milo and Bella all take a magical trip inside their very own bubbles floating across the sky!
46	46	"I Can't Do It"	8 November 1999
The Tweenies find out that it is no good saying "I can't do it" – they must try! Jake finds out he can sing Looby Lou, Fizz that she can stand still and Milo and the rest have an adventure with an alien in outer space!
47	47	"Leaves"	9 November 1999
Milo finds a leaf stuck in his jacket and becomes convinced he's a tree. Max looks at different leaves, and Judy goes on a search to find an oak tree.
48	48	"Milo the Clown"	10 November 1999
Milo is concerned that he cannot join in with the circus game, because he cannot be as funny as the other clowns. The other clowns can juggle and spin plates, but Milo cannot. Then Judy tells a story about a clown called Milo, convincing him that all he has to do is be himself.
49	49	"Litter"	11 November 1999
The Tweenies are taught what litter is and Jake invents a game of Litterbug. Playing Pass the Parcel is good fun, but what a mess it makes - the only place for all that litter is in the bin!
50	50	"Disappearing Shoes"	12 November 1999
Strange goings-on are afoot, as first Milo's shoe, then the dressing-up shoes, and then Max's gardening shoes go missing, but who is the mystery shoe snatcher?
51	51	"Get Down Doodles!"	15 November 1999
Doodles gets stuck in a tree and the friends use pogo sticks, butterfly wings, aeroplanes, balloons and, finally, a ladder to get him down.
52	52	"Making Up"	16 November 1999
Bella and Milo fall out and won't talk to each other, so Jake and Fizz try to make the peace, but eventually, it's Doodles who comes to the rescue.
53	53	"Water"	17 November 1999
Jake is playing in water and starts to imagine that the whole playroom is flooded.
54	54	"Feel It"	18 November 1999
The Tweenies play "who am I?" by wearing a blindfold, trying to guess who is in front of them just by touching. Milo loves his blindfold so much that he keeps it on all day, while Jake and Bella make a picture they can feel.
55	55	"Milking"	19 November 1999
The Tweenies are not convinced that milk comes from cows. They can't believe you squeeze those dangly things and then drink it. Judy visits a friend's farm one day and shows what happens.
56	56	"Space"	22 November 1999
The Tweenies make their own solar system and Jake constructs a rocket. Together Captain Jake and his intrepid crew then set off on a space voyage into the unknown, to boldly go where no Tweenie has gone before!
57	57	"Hospital Visit"	23 November 1999
Fizz is taken to hospital for a checkup after she falls off her bike and hurts her wrist. Meanwhile, Jake, Bella and Milo make their own pretend hospital as they wait for Fizz to return.
58	58	"Café"	24 November 1999
Bella makes a café for the others to visit for tea, while Max shows them his visit to a real café.
59	59	"Cut Finger"	25 November 1999
Judy demonstrates how to dress a wound when Jake falls and cuts his finger. Then they all make finger puppets and perform a show.
60	60	"Milo's Scooter"	26 November 1999
Milo causes chaos as he tries to balance on his scooter, and Fizz, Jake and Bella play a game of musical statues.
61	61	"It's a Circle"	29 November 1999
Milo shows the others how to draw a perfect circle. Then they go circle-spotting in the playroom and the garden. Jake feels left out because he is not as quick as the others, but when he becomes Dot Man he finds plenty of circles and puts them to good use rescuing Doodles.
62	62	"Oh Oh, I'm Shrinking"	30 November 1999
When the gang find a wiggly worm in the garden they wonder what it would be like to be teeny-weeny. Fizz's magic words transport the Tweenies to a giant world full of enormous flowers, buckets and snozzle monsters.
63	63	"Harvest"	1 December 1999
While Judy cuts the grass with a lawnmower, Max watches a combine harvester in the fields cutting wheat.
64	64	"Pancakes"	2 December 1999
Max tells Fizz his favourite food is pancakes, so the Tweenies make some for him, but then Doodles spoils the culinary surprise by eating the lot.
65	65	"1, 2, 3, 4, 5"	3 December 1999
Jake tries to count the new buckets that he finds behind the surprise curtain, Bella and Milo try to help by building sandcastles and making flags.
66	66	"In and Out"	6 December 1999
Jake cannot co-ordinate himself when he dances the Hokey Cokey.
67	67	"What?! No Books!"	7 December 1999
Fizz and Milo discover that all the storybooks have disappeared and wonder where they have gone. So instead of reading them a tale, Judy asks them to help her tell the story of Ananse and the Sky God.
68	68	"Camouflage"	8 December 1999
Bella introduces her new pet, Sally the stick insect, and the gang see other animals that use colours and patterns for hiding. Meanwhile, Milo finds a clever way to hide in the garden so that the others can't find him.
69	69	"Train Journey"	9 December 1999
Max's car has broken down so he decides to get the train. Having bought his ticket, found a seat and bought a drink, he falls asleep and misses his stop. He gets off at the next stop and misses the next train back. He arrives very late at the playgroup and tells the Tweenies all that has happened.
70	70	"Frosty Day"	10 December 1999
After singing Here We Go Round the Mulberry Bush on a cold and frosty morning, the Tweenies are disappointed to find that all the snow and ice in the garden has melted. Max helps them to make it a frosty day inside by showing them how to make paper ice patterns and icicles. Finally, the Tweenies can step outside into the magical world of Jack Frost.
71	71	"Pretend Friend"	13 December 1999
Jake introduces his new invisible friend called Douglas. Meanwhile, Fizz and Bella are practising a new dance – Tweenie Beat, but Jake cannot seem to learn it. Perhaps Douglas can help?
72	72	"Bridges"	14 December 1999
Max takes Fizz and Jake for a boat trip on the River Thames. Later, Judy, Milo and Bella see a footbridge in the country.
73	73	"The Bracelet"	15 December 1999
Bella has a new bracelet and boasts about it. Fizz is jealous, and she makes her own bracelet from pasta. Then Bella breaks her bracelet when showing off. The Tweenies all try to look for the missing beads.
74	74	"Building Blocks"	16 December 1999
Piles of books arrive in the playroom and the Tweenies use them to build tall towers instead of reading them.
75	75	"Jake's Ill"	17 December 1999
Jake looks through his box of games to recall fond memories while he recovers from a bout of chickenpox.
76	76	"The Fallen Star"	20 December 1999
Fizz finds a fallen star in the garden while the gang are putting up their Christmas decorations. Did it drop from the tinsel Milo played with or did it fall from the sky?
77	77	"The Christmas Fairy"	21 December 1999
Bella wants to be the fairy on top of the Christmas tree.
78	78	"Santa's Little Helper"	22 December 1999
Dotman and Alf Elf visit Santa in his grotto at the North Pole to watch him wrap his gifts, and what to do when you have no wrapping paper, only potatoes.
79	79	"The Nativity"	23 December 1999
The Tweenies prepare to perform their own nativity play – but who will play which part?
80	80	"Christmas Eve"	24 December 1999
The Tweenies hope for a visit from Father Christmas. If their dreams come true, they will be taken on the trip of a lifetime on Santa's sleigh and see the children of all the world.
81	81	"Corner Shop"	27 December 1999
The Tweenies are having a picnic, but Judy has forgotten a few items, so she pops out to the corner shop. She gets a bit carried away and forgets what she went for. Eventually, the picnic is ready and they all tuck in.
82	82	"Can't Go There"	28 December 1999
Fizz and her friends cannot go in the garden or on the computer. They cannot go anywhere! They decide on a magical flying carpet ride.
83	83	"Signs"	29 December 1999
Fizz discovers a special picture box in her toybox – it is a sign. The Tweenies discover that signs tell you all sorts of things – like where to find the post office or the toilet. Max makes some special signs which take the Tweenies on a treasure hunt.
84	84	"Sleep Over"	30 December 1999
Bella is having a sleep-over at Fizz's house. Fizz gets annoyed with Bella coming in and disrupting her very tidy bedroom. However, once Fizz has calmed down a bit, they have a laugh about some of the silly things the Tweenies have done at playgroup. Note: This is the only episode not to feature the Tweenie Clock (not counting the opening sequence).
85	85	"Supermarket"	31 December 1999
Max goes shopping after learning a special remembering song to make sure that he doesn't forget what to buy.

=== Series 2 (1999-2000) ===
No. overall	No. in series	Title	Original release date
86	1	"Television"	31 January 2000
The Tweenies find out the TV is gone, so they decide to do their own TV shows. Bella sings a song, Jake and Doodles do some juggling and Milo and Judy tell a story. Max brings his naughty friend called Arnold, but Fizz is upset because she can't think of anything to do, until she does Tweenie News time.
87	2	"Bus Ride"	1 February 2000
Judy is given a bag of toys by some older children but leaves it on a bus.
88	3	"Fast and Slow"	2 February 2000
After playing a clapping game, Fizz upsets Jake by saying he's slow and makes him upset as he runs off making Fizz sad as she didn't mean to hurt him.
89	4	"Red Riding Hood"	3 February 2000
The Tweenies have a picnic in the woods with their teddy bears. Max then tells them the story of Little Red Riding Hood, which Bella decides they should act out, with her in the title role.
90	5	"Dustcart"	4 February 2000
Milo is upset when his paper plane is taken away in the dustcart. Meanwhile, Fizz and Bella learn about recycling.
91	6	"Old Photograph"	7 February 2000
Judy shows the Tweenies a photo of her great-grandmother. Fascinated, they decide to dress as old-fashioned people and have Judy take pictures of them. Then they take a trip back in time and experience a carriage ride, with Doodles as the horse.
92	7	"Square Things"	8 February 2000
Bella tries to get the others to join her square club. She makes square badges for them, then she organises a square brick-building contest. But Milo does not follow the rules of the game.
93	8	"Flying"	16 February 2000
Milo and Jake pretend to be aeroplanes and disrupt Fizz and Bella's teddy-bears picnic. Max takes them to see some real planes, and they get a much closer look than he had anticipated. Note: this episode did not get broadcast on BBC1 on 9 February 2000, due to Snooker at 2:40pm on that day.
94	9	"Elves"	10 February 2000
Judy has dusting, tidying and cleaning to do in the playroom. She tells the Tweenies that she wishes she had some elves to help her, so Bella, Fizz and Milo decide to be elves for the day and secretly tidy the playroom. Jake heads for the garden and makes a very special friend.
95	10	"Stones"	11 February 2000
Jake finds a treasure stone, which impresses the others. Max helps them to paint stones, then tells a story using stones as illustrations. In the end, each Tweenie has their own treasure stone, and there's even one for Doodles.
96	11	"Spring"	14 February 2000
Max, Bella and Jake go for a walk down the road to see some of the sights of spring.
97	12	"Summer"	15 February 2000
Max falls asleep in the sunny sandpit and dreams of the seaside.
98	13	"Autumn"	16 February 2000
Fizz is worried when all the leaves fall off the tree in the garden. Max takes her and Jake to the park to see all the other trees. They are amazed by all the different coloured leaves and use some to make a picture to take back to show the others.
99	14	"Winter"	17 February 2000
Max shows the others how cold weather can make people can have 'dragon breath', then teaches Jake and Fizz about the changing seasons, dragons and hibernation.
100	15	"Zoo"	18 February 2000
Jake is at his grandmother's house, so he misses a trip to the zoo, but Max has a plan.
101	16	"Aladdin"	21 February 2000
The Tweenies tell the story of Aladdin. They play different parts: Milo plays Aladdin, Fizz plays Aladdin's mum and plays the beautiful Princess, Jake plays Uncle Abanzar, and Doodles plays Smuglee, his evil dog and Bella plays the genie of the ring and the lamp.
102	17	"Puppet Show"	22 February 2000
The delivery of a fridge-freezer leaves a huge cardboard box left over. Fizz decides that it could be a puppet theatre. With Judy's help, they get to work to paint the box and make stick puppets. The puppet show is a spectacular success: Fizz narrates and the others act the story with the puppets they have made.
103	18	"Whistling"	23 February 2000
The Tweenies are fascinated by whistling, but are frustrated by their inability to actually do it – until Max brings them a bag of whistles. They make so much noise that they are told to play something quieter. Meanwhile, Doodles is behaving very strangely. Bella meets some birds in the garden who show her how to whistle like them. Max reappears and the mystery of Doodles' behaviour is explained.
104	19	"Old & New"	24 February 2000
Fizz and Jake are jealous when Milo gets a new plane and Bella gets a new scarf. Their frustration is made worse when they are excluded from the New Gang. Max does his best to demonstrate to Fizz and Jake that old is not necessarily bad, but they remain unconvinced. Gradually, they come to terms with their situation via a fantasy about flying in the old plane and a timely and relevant story.
105	20	"Dinosaurs"	25 February 2000
The Tweenies play with their toy dinosaurs while Max makes a film at a museum.
106	21	"Left Out"	28 February 2000
Milo, Fizz and Jake are having a one, two, three day leaving Bella out prompted by Judy bringing in three cardboard boxes. Unfortunately, Bella is a bit late in discovering this and opts out of the ensuing games. Although the others in no way intended to exclude her, Bella feels left out. The final straw is when she does not get to play a bear in Goldilocks. But then she is persuaded to take on the starring role, to great acclaim.
107	22	"Sounds"	29 February 2000
Max has returned from the park with his tape recorder, on which he has been capturing sounds. Before he can play them back however, he goes to have a nap, so it is left to Judy to do it. After they have guessed the noises, she explains what recording a sound is all about. However, in the middle of this, Fizz hears a strange noise. Milo and Bella find out that the noise is Max who is snoring and decide to play a trick on him.
108	23	"Wizard"	1 March 2000
Milo has bought a magic wand, turning himself into Wando the Wizard. Jake has a go in Milo's absence and believes he has made Doodles disappear. The others join in to look for him with a search and a song – but to no avail. Milo and Jake then imagine going to see a real wizard in Australia. He is called Wizard Oz, who is thrilled at the appearance of Milo and Jake. He gives them a suggestion.
109	24	"Pushing"	2 March 2000
Doodles eats a batch of homemade biscuits, then the Tweenies discover different types of pushing when Doodles gets stuck in the doorway.
110	25	"Country Road"	3 March 2000
It is cold outside – as Doodles finds out when he is accidentally shut out of the playroom. Max looks at his flower book and talks about all the flowers he will grow in spring. The Tweenies walk along a country road and discover all sorts of life going on. They learn about horses, and what farmers have to do all year round. They also find holly and see other evidence of nature's winter offerings.
111	26	"Lambing"	6 March 2000
Fizz is looking after the toy lamb, so Max takes her and Jake off to the farm to see some real lambs. They have a good look around the farm and find the lambs with their mothers out in the field. Jake wonders where they get their woolly coats from, so they watch a real lamb being born.
112	27	"It's a Secret"	7 March 2000
Milo will not reveal what is inside his box, claiming that it is a secret – much to the other Tweenies' annoyance. They are cross and say that friends should share their secrets. They make their own boxes and tease Milo by refusing to say what's inside them. Eventually, Milo opens his box and reveals his secret, but can he persuade the others to tell?
113	28	"Rabbits & Elephants"	8 March 2000
During a game of piggy-in-the-middle, Jake is teased for being small. Judy suggests that they all dress up to tell the story of the smallest rabbit who managed to banish a herd of elephants from his family's home. They all realise that the smallest person can be the star of the show and Jake enjoys his moment of glory.
114	29	"Windy Day"	9 March 2000
Jake hears strange noises in the garden. They investigate and discover that it is the wind, which they decide is a monster. Max leads them in a Riverdance version of Michael Finnigan, then helps them to make monster masks. The Tweenies have great fun as their masks take over both in and out of the wind.
115	30	"Streams"	10 March 2000
Max goes fishing, where he spots a frog, plants and weeds.
116	31	"Friends"	13 March 2000
Fizz and Bella are best friends and do everything together, but today Bella seems to be having more fun with Milo. A sad Fizz thinks she has lost her friend until Bella realises that something is wrong. They make up and realise that friendship is very precious.
117	32	"A Walk in the Country"	14 March 2000
Judy has a walk in the countryside when she housesits for a friend.
118	33	"A Walk in the Town"	15 March 2000
Max takes a trip to the launderette and decides to have a stroll around the town.
119	34	"Mouse"	16 March 2000
As the Tweenies sing and play, Doodles tries to tell them that he has found something. Each time the Tweenies go to look, they see nothing. However, Fizz believes Doodles, and eventually, the two of them discover the mouse which has found its way into the playroom. Judy explains that they must put the mouse in the nearby field.
120	35	"Minibeasts"	17 March 2000
Fizz wants to be a princess who goes to a ball. The boys are interested in finding bugs and insects. Fizz doesn't like creepy crawlies, but Bella persuades her to look for butterflies because they are pretty and gentle. They find a beetle, a worm, a ladybug and a caterpillar, but no butterflies. Fizz is upset, but then Judy gets them all to perform a song which makes them all happy (The Ugly Bug Ball), with Fizz pretending to be a butterfly.
121	36	"Flowers"	20 March 2000
Milo breaks Bella's wand, so she goes in search of a new one and decides that a flower with a long stem will do very well. Luckily, Judy catches her before she cuts it. Judy explains why she should not pick wildflowers and takes Bella and Milo to the park to have a closer look at a variety of flowers.
122	37	"Those Are the Rules"	21 March 2000
The Tweenies are playing hide and seek, but Jake watches where the others hide. They think he has done brilliantly and make him a special badge. Jake admits that he has cheated and the others are really angry with him. Judy steps in and helps them make up by organising a special game.
123	38	"Sports Day"	22 March 2000
Milo has just been to his brother's sports day where there were many races. The others decide that they should have their own Tweenie sports day, so Max and Judy help them set up the races, make medals and organise an opening parade. The Tweenies have great fun with eggs and spoons, the three-legged race and the sack race.
124	39	"Paper"	23 March 2000
Jake is excited about his new Dot Man comic, but Doodles gets in everybody's way and he accidentally rips the comic, making Jake cry. Max cheers Jake and the others up with a game called Pass the Parcel and Jake and Doodles become friends again.
125	40	"Fire Engine"	24 March 2000
The Tweenies are playing catch when Bella throws the ball and gets it stuck in the tree. Fizz, Milo and Judy go on a trip to a fire station for some advice, while Jake, Bella and Max try to get their ball down from the tree. Fizz, Milo and Judy meet a firefighter, who shows them a fire engine with a ladder. Meanwhile, trying to get the ball out of the tree, Max, Jake and Bella get more things stuck up there. Milo and Fizz return to save the day.
126	41	"Tidying"	27 March 2000
Milo has lost his favourite bouncy ball and the others agree to help him find it. They search everywhere and create a mess, but Milo's ball is nowhere to be seen. Realising that Max and Judy will not be too pleased when they discover the state of the playroom, the Tweenies decide that it is tidy up time. Eventually, Milo finds his ball in an unexpected place.
127	42	"Cliffs"	28 March 2000
Jake and Bella are playing boats, but Bella can't decide where to put her lighthouse. Judy builds her a play block cliff. Judy then remembers what it was like when she visited some cliffs. She starts at the bottom and catches a funicular railway to the top. The feeling at the top is very different and Judy can see many different things from high up on the cliffs. Note: Milo and Fizz are absent.
128	43	"Naughty Corner"	29 March 2000
Max has sent Milo to the naughty corner for pinching Bella. Whilst there, Milo realises that Bella, Fizz, Jake and Doodles have also been naughty occasionally. Flashback episodes: Noise & Quiet, I Am Me, Bracelet, Stones, Can't Go There, & Pancakes.
129	44	"Undersea World"	30 March 2000
Judy is looking after a goldfish called Miranda. The Tweenies want to see many fish and Judy knows just the place. Judy, Max and the Tweenies take a trip to the sealife centre where they find a variety of fish of all shapes and sizes. Milo and Bella even see a shark! Note: This is the final appearance of "Take a Trip with the Tweenies".
130	45	"Fizz's Scrapbook"	31 March 2000
Fizz tries to explain to Jake why a scrapbook is so wonderful to keep and how the things in her scrapbook all have special memories attached to them. Note 1: This is the last episode where Sally Preisig voices Bella, although her voice was still used sometimes for some "Tweenie Clock, where will it stop?" clips. Note 2: Milo, Bella & Doodles appear in flashbacks only as they are absent from the playgroup in this episode (except for the Song Time). Note 3: This is the only episode where neither Max nor Judy appear.

=== Series 3 (2000) ===
No. overall	No. in series	Title	Original release date
131	1	"Milo's Orange"	24 July 2000
Milo takes on the impossible challenge of finding a rhyme for 'orange'. He eventually comes up with rhymes for the parts of an orange. Note: This is the first episode where Emma Weaver voices Bella, as well as the first episode to have its title read out by one or more of the characters.
132	2	"Mirror, Mirror"	25 July 2000
Fizz wants to see what she looks like in her new hat, so Bella makes a mirror out of a silver tray and some card. Then Max tells them the story of Snow White.
133	3	"Oodles of Doodles"	26 July 2000
Doodles is upsetting the Tweenies today, so Max takes them to the park, leaving Doodles home alone. Doodles decides to have some fun. He plays the frog game on the computer, which Milo was playing earlier, then he plays firefighters, which Bella was doing earlier, he reads a story, which Fizz had done earlier, and does some painting, which Jake did earlier, and then sings a song called Oodles of Doodles.
134	4	"Horses"	27 July 2000
Judy meets a variety of horses of all shapes and sizes.
135	5	"Magic Magnets"	28 July 2000
When Milo moves a metal washer without touching it, it could be magic or a magnet. The Tweenies explore magic magnets and race each other on their magic magnet racetracks.
136	6	"Jake's Balloon"	31 July 2000
Jake finds a balloon in the garden and imagines floating all over the world holding onto its string. Meanwhile, Bella, Milo and Fizz set about letting the balloon people know where to find the balloon.
137	7	"Pirates"	1 August 2000
Bearded Bella, Muncher Milo, Fizz the Fright and Jolly Roger Jake dress up as pirates and sail the seven seas in search of treasure.
138	8	"Castles"	2 August 2000
Max imagines that he is a king when he visits a castle. Note: This episode is located at Hever Castle in Edenbridge.
139	9	"Fizz's Dinosaur"	3 August 2000
After Milo annoys her, Fizz spends the day with her small, blue stripy dinosaur called Susan.
140	10	"Eggs"	4 August 2000
Milo gets so excited doing the Hokey Cokey, he bumps into Judy and she drops the shopping – breaking the eggs! The Tweenies find out where eggs come from, hear why Humpty Dumpty sat on the wall, and join in with the egg hunt.
141	11	"Sneezing"	7 August 2000
Jake helps Max by doing the dusting, until he upsets the others. He loses Milo's screw for his truck, making Milo sneeze. He loses the bits for Fizz's bracelet, making Fizz sneeze. He ruins Bella's tea party, loses her sweets as Doodles eats them, making Bella sneeze. Jake soon realises why the others are cross and sneezing.
142	12	"Max's DIY Day"	8 August 2000
Max tries to build a Wendy House without much success.
143	13	"Dot to Dot"	9 August 2000
It is raining, but Max knows how to chase away the rainy day blues. He has prepared some dot-to-dot puzzles, which the Tweenies enjoy completing. Later, Max's story leads them to a strange land, where clues to their escape are dot-to-dot puzzles. They manage to reach a magical island with a little help from Dot-To-Dotman.
144	14	"Missing"	10 August 2000
Doodles is missing. Desperate searches and frantic calling cannot make him appear. Max tells them about detectives, and complete with magnifying glasses and drawing pads they set about finding him. Through the discovery of some clues, they piece together what must have happened to Doodles, a series of strange happenings involving (among other things) some pirate hairdressers. Keep your eyes open to solve the mystery!
145	15	"Trumpet"	11 August 2000
Bella is being a bandleader, and the Tweenies decide to make a marching band playing their own instruments. Fizz plays the cymbals, Milo plays the drum and Jake plays the trumpet. But when Jake goes to tell Judy about the band, Milo falls and accidentally breaks Jake's trumpet. When Milo tells Jake what happened, Jake ends up crying, until the others make him a one man band.
146	16	"Lazy"	14 August 2000
The Tweenies have had enough of the mess Doodles makes with his toys. No matter how many times they tidy them up, Doodles seems to re-create the mess. Eventually, they realise the reason for the mess – Doodles needs a toybox. Max helps them make one, but will it solve the problem of the lazy, messy Doodles?
147	17	"Giraffes"	15 August 2000
Jake pretends to be a giraffe, setting everyone on a search to discover who is the tallest. Jake is upset when he turns out to be the shortest, but rises above his disappointment with the help of Doodles and Max.
148	18	"Clapping"	16 August 2000
When Judy hears a thunderstorm, she decides to play clapping games with the Tweenies. Jake is upset because he cannot clap as well as the others, but cheers himself up by taking part in a flamenco show with Fizz. While performing in the show, Jake discovers something amazing.
149	19	"Practical Jokes"	17 August 2000
Milo's brother has given him a whoopee cushion, and he and Bella set about using it to play a practical joke on the others. Bella and Milo go on to find other jokes, but unfortunately Jake becomes the main victim. His sadness is helped by Max showing how to make a practical joke of his own. He then uses this knowledge to get his own back on the others. Friends again, they team up to play the best practical joke of all on Max.
150	20	"Judy's Painting"	18 August 2000
Judy wants to paint a quiet picture of the countryside, but the Tweenies think otherwise.
151	21	"Dirty Hands"	21 August 2000
While helping Max plant bulbs in the garden, Milo ends up with very muddy hands. He then accidentally uses Fizz's special cushion to wipe them clean – which upsets Fizz a great deal. The only thing that can save him is cleaning the cushion, but this turns out to be harder than it looks, until Max saves the day.
152	22	"Penguin Power"	22 August 2000
Milo wins a penguin suit, but is unsure of what to do with it – he has no idea how penguins behave. So Max shows the Tweenies a video of penguins waddling, swimming and hatching eggs, and the Tweenies have fun with the penguin outfit.
153	23	"Max's Birthday"	23 August 2000
When Fizz sees Max with a birthday card, she assumes it is his birthday and rushes off to tell the others. Between them, they arrange a surprise party for Max, with special food and games. However, it turns out to be Max who has a surprise for the Tweenies at the end of the day.
154	24	"Lighthouse"	24 August 2000
Max is asked to look after a lighthouse for the night.
155	25	"Mixing Colours"	25 August 2000
Max has a puzzle for the Tweenies: how do you make six colours from only three pots of paint? They struggle at first, but by accident, they discover that by mixing two colours together they can create a new colour. Proudly they present Max with six pieces of paper, each painted a different colour. Max is able to stick each piece of paper on the sides of a cardboard box to make a giant coloured dye, which they use for a colour game.
156	26	"I Don't Like That"	28 August 2000
Fizz does not want to sing, and she does not want to join in with the picnic Max and Judy are organising, because Fizz doesn't want any of the sandwiches, which are cheese, ham, honey, and jam. She only wants chocolate spread, but there isn't any. So Milo helps Fizz out by making a song called Don't Like That, then Judy comes to the rescue.
157	27	"Nursery Rhyme Land"	29 August 2000
Judy sets out to meet the Tweenies favourite nursery rhyme characters. Note: This episode is located at Blackgang Chine on the Isle of Wight.
158	28	"Pot of Gold"	30 August 2000
Jake loses his chocolate gold coin while playing a game of hide-and-seek. Judy tells them a story about the gold at the end of the rainbow, and then they imagine that they are going to find some. Judy then helps Jake to find his coin at the end of their rainbow!
159	29	"Bella's Big Surprise"	31 August 2000
Bella has hidden herself behind the surprise curtains and no one is allowed to see what she is doing. The others go off to play and discover many triangular shapes, but when they try to show Bella, they make her cross. Max takes the others for a walk to the park while Bella struggles with her task. She is about to give up when she gets encouragement from a special friend. The others return and Bella is ready to reveal her big surprise.
160	30	"Cool"	1 September 2000
Milo decides that he is going to be really cool and Fizz follows suit. Milo has learned from his brother about talking cool, looking cool and acting cool, so when Max suggests that they put on a show for Judy, Milo decides that he and Fizz are not going to help because it would be uncool. But he soon realises that they are missing out on a lot of fun and comes up with a fantastic idea for the show.

=== Series 4 (2000) ===
No. overall	No. in series	Title	Original release date
161	1	"Hot-Air Balloon"	9 October 2000
Fizz arrives to sing a song with the other Tweenies, but before they finish, she has to go to the toilet. Doodles hears a strange noise and the Tweenies follow him to the window, where they see a wonderful sight – a hot-air balloon. Fizz arrives back just as the balloon flies away and she is terribly disappointed not to see it. Judy shows the Tweenies many hot-air balloons at Video Time, and finally, Fizz sees some real hot-air balloons.
162	2	"I'm Magic"	10 October 2000
Jake wants to be a magician, but his attempts end in failure. Max teaches him a magic trick and Milo, Fizz and Bella are very impressed.
163	3	"Hairstyle"	11 October 2000
Bella arrives with a new hairstyle, and the other Tweenies make fun of her because she looks different. Bella gets upset, but Max declares that her hair looks 'smashingly good' and shows them all some fun hairstyles. This gives Bella a great idea. She shows the others how they can make some brand new hair for Max.
164	4	"Lifeboat"	12 October 2000
Judy has an eventful trip to the seaside when she comes to a boat's rescue while helping a lifeboat crew.
165	5	"I'm Better Than You"	13 October 2000
Bella upsets Fizz, Milo and Jake when she keeps telling them she's better than them at the Tweenies fun fair. She tries to play catch a rat, which Fizz wins and Bella gets upset that she didn't win. Bella tries to play hoppla, which Jake wins. Bella tries to knock down the tubes, but doesn't win. The others tell Max what Bella said. Max tells Bella it's not nice to tell everyone your better than them, she promises never to say it again. Doodles organises a game, which Bella does well in, but instantly breaks her promise and says she's best.
166	6	"Seeing Red"	16 October 2000
The Tweenies decide to do some painting. Fizz decides to paint rainbows, but Bella thinks that the only colour for her is red. So she creates a club where everything has to be red. Jake joins the Red Club, but Milo and Fizz decide that they like many other colours, so they stay in the playroom to finish their rainbows. Bella and Jake manage to find many red things to play with, but eventually, they realise that their rules are too strict.
167	7	"Teddy Bear Day"	17 October 2000
It's teddy bear day and the Tweenies have each brought a teddy to show the others. Milo loses his teddy and Doodles looks after it until he loses it too. Max finds the teddy in the yard and they have a teddy bear picnic to celebrate.
168	8	"Camping Trip"	18 October 2000
Max samples the great outdoors when he goes camping.
169	9	"That's a Bad Cough Doodles"	19 October 2000
Doodles has a bad cough, so the others try to come up with ways to make him better. They try all sorts of methods. They wrap him in dressing-up clothes, but Doodles does not like it, so Jake decides to make him a bed out of toilet paper.
170	10	"I'm Shouting"	20 October 2000
Max is ill with a headache, so Fizz asks everyone to play quietly, but she soon ends up shouting herself.
171	11	"Elephants"	23 October 2000
The Tweenies have an "Elephant day" and turn their slide into an elephant's trunk.
172	12	"Fruit Market"	24 October 2000
Judy goes to the market to buy some fruit for the Tweenies, but finds that Jake's favourite, strawberries, are sold out. The Tweenies decide to pick their own.
173	13	"Doodles the Daring"	25 October 2000
Trash is being thrown out of the recycling bin in the Tweenie garden, and Max discovers that the culprit is a fox looking for food. Jake and Doodles imagine that they meet Lionel the naughty fox, and Doodles helps him find his mummy.
174	14	"Diwali"	26 October 2000
Fizz brings some Diwali sweets for everyone to try, and Judy shows the Tweenies a video about the festival. She has also brought in some Diwali costumes, and the Tweenies act out the story of Princess Sita, Prince Rama, Prince Lakshman and Hanuman the magical monkey.
175	15	"A Story from India"	27 October 2000
Max tells an Indian tale about the old washerwoman and the goddess Lakshmi, which the Tweenies act out in the garden. Bella plays the washerwoman, Fizz plays the queen, Milo is the king and Jake is the crow who steals the queen's necklace.
176	16	"Floating is Fab-a-Rooney"	30 October 2000
It is Doodles' bath day and he is hiding from Max and will not go near the bath. The Tweenies discover which objects float and sink and make boats race in the bath. Milo has a plan to get Doodles into the bath. He lays a trail of dog biscuits, but Doodles has a better idea.
177	17	"Milo's Jungle"	31 October 2000
Milo tells the others about his jungle, and they do not believe him. He imagines he visits the jungle and meets all kinds of animals. The Tweenies are very excited about this and go with him to the fantasy jungle.
178	18	"Me First"	1 November 2000
Jake is fed up with always being left till last. He discovers that you can go first if you are old, if you are a lady and if it is your birthday. He has an idea how he can get to go first: he dresses up like his grandma who has a birthday.
179	19	"Cross-Channel Ferry"	2 November 2000
Max goes on a ferry trip to Jersey, but his car breaks down on board, so he takes a tour of the ship instead.
180	20	"Who Do You Love?"	3 November 2000
The Tweenies tell each other who they love most of all, but Doodles feels left out. Bella and Fizz say they are best friends, but Bella gets jealous when Fizz includes Jake. They perform the Ugly Duckling story, which helps Bella to feel included again, and they tell Doodles how much they love him.
181	21	"Max Blows a Fuse"	6 November 2000
All the lights go out when Max blows a fuse as he sets up a slide show. The Tweenies like it in the dark, so they go on a doggy hunt. Sparky the electrician comes to fix the lights, and Max breaks his projector as he tries to start his slide show.
182	22	"Polar Bears"	7 November 2000
The friends watch a video to learn all about polar bears, then Jake imagines he meets a polar bear who teaches him the polar bear stomp. The others make the Tweenie garden look like the North Pole to help Jake remember the dance. Then they have fun dancing around.
183	23	"Pink is Yuk-a-Rooney"	8 November 2000
Milo thinks pink is "Yuk-a-Rooney", so Fizz and Bella try to prove that pink is a nice colour. This includes making him wear pink clothes if he likes something pink.
184	24	"Milo's Odd Socks"	9 November 2000
Milo has lost one of his socks. The Tweenies play a game with Max called 'pairs' and they visit Odd Sock Land. They find Milo's odd sock in the playroom and they make pom poms to decorate a pair of socks for Doodles.
185	25	"Dinosaur Park"	10 November 2000
Judy spots more than she had bargained for on a trip to the dinosaur park.
186	26	"Tea Party"	13 November 2000
The Tweenies want to have a tea party, but they can't decide where to hold it.
187	27	"We Miss Bella"	14 November 2000
Bella is not in because she is ill, but all the Tweenies are thinking of her. They decide to make a get well card for a poorly Bella.
188	28	"Tweenies Grand Prix"	15 November 2000
Judy, Fizz and Jake race snails after finding one in the garden, while Milo and Bella make racing cars.
189	29	"Motor Boat"	16 November 2000
Max sets off in a motorboat to catch a fish for his tea. He casts his line and manages to catch a number of things, but none of them are fish.
190	30	"Fierce as a Lion"	17 November 2000
Jake tries to imitate a lion, but he hasn't got a very good roar. The Tweenies look at some real lions and Judy helps Jake make a lion's mane.
191	31	"The Wall"	20 November 2000
The Tweenies watch a video about building a brick wall, and decide to build a big wall in the playroom, but find it stops them from playing together.
192	32	"High & Low"	21 November 2000
Max goes sightseeing in London and finds that things that look big from the ground, look small from up in the air.
193	33	"Judy's Guitar"	22 November 2000
Judy brings her guitar to show the Tweenies, but while she is out shopping, Max plays it very badly, so the Tweenies join in with their own instruments.
194	34	"Monster Nosh"	23 November 2000
Milo wants to be a monster, so the Tweenies make monster masks and have a monster nosh in the garden. Doodles thinks he has a belly monster, but it is his tummy rumbling. He and Bella play a trick on Milo.
195	35	"Odd One Out"	24 November 2000
The Tweenies play an odd-one-out game, in which the odd one out must wear a hat.
196	36	"Don't Tickle Me"	27 November 2000
Jake uses his special tickling feather to tickle the other Tweenies without them knowing. They think they have a tickle monster in their midst! Eventually, Jake is caught out and becomes the one to get tickled.
197	37	"It's a Black Day"	28 November 2000
The Tweenies go on a fantasy rocket in the black sky, and Fizz finds a sparkly star for the end of Doodle's nose.
198	38	"London Boats"	29 November 2000
Max lends a hand on a very special boat, whilst watching the boats on the River Thames.
199	39	"What's the Magic Word?"	30 November 2000
The Tweenies ask Judy to help them construct a miniature golf course. She agrees – but not before they say 'please'.
200	40	"Times of the Day"	1 December 2000
The Tweenies play a guessing game about different times of the day.

=== Series 5 (2000-2001) ===
No. overall	No. in series	Title	Original release date
201	1	"Invitations"	18 December 2000
The Tweenies stage their own pantomime and make invitations for their parents.
202	2	"Penelope Pink"	18 December 2000
Fizz meets her dream toy, Penelope Pink the Pop Princess; but Penelope is not as sweet as she looks.
203	3	"Cold Wilson"	19 December 2000
Milo is desperate to make a snowman, but there is so little snow. The answer is to make a little snowman called Cold Wilson and bring him inside to keep him warm.
204	4	"Highly Strung"	19 December 2000
Jake meets a highly-strung string puppet called Jangles and helps give him the confidence to perform.
205	5	"Wishes"	20 December 2000
Fizz wishes her pals were different by using Doodles' wishbone. Bella isn't bossy, Milo is quiet and Jake is 4 years old and can do things that he couldn't do before.
206	6	"Little Blue Plane"	20 December 2000
Milo does not like playing with baby toys like plastic planes - he prefers his rocket just like Commander Cosmos' - until he meets a magical, little blue plane called Joffi in the Enchanted Toyshop.
207	7	"Getting Ready"	21 December 2000
The Tweenies get ready for their show, but what is the story of Jack and the Beans that talk?
208	8	"Mousehole Theatre"	21 December 2000
Bella meets a troupe of theatrical mice in need of a director.
209	9	"Jake and the Beanstalk"	22 December 2000
The Tweenies perform a panto called Jake and the Beanstalk.
210	10	"Christmas Morning"	22 December 2000
The Enchanted Toyshop wakes up to some surprises on Christmas Day.
Special	N–A	"Tweenies Top of the Pops Special"	24 December 2000
The Tweenies are on Top of the Pops as they sing one of their albums and sing lots of songs. Special guest star: Adrian Dickson as himself. Note: This is the first Top of the Pops special to introduce the Tweenies.
211	11	"It's Going Round & Round"	2 January 2001
When Milo plays with his yo-yo, everyone wants to have a go too, but only Fizz has the knack.
212	12	"Up the Mountain"	3 January 2001
Judy visits Snowdon in search of "something wonderful".
213	13	"Someone Tell Bella"	4 January 2001
Bella is being bossy and is telling the others they are going into the jungle after news time. When they tell Bella she keeps thinking about herself, she gets upset because she thinks they don't like her anymore.
214	14	"The King with Dirty Feet"	5 January 2001
Milo comes in from the garden and leaves muddy footprints on the floor. While the mud is drying, Judy tells the Tweenies a story about the King With Dirty Feet. The Tweenies act it out in the playroom with a special river and beautiful patchwork carpet.
215	15	"Copycats"	8 January 2001
When Doodles starts copying Bella, the Tweenies decide to play a "copying" game. They act out the story of Chicken Licken and end up copying Doodles.
216	16	"I Just Can't Wait"	15 January 2001
Judy brings in parcels of costumes for Cleo's fancy dress party, but the Tweenies have to wait before they are allowed to open them. Milo finds it very hard to wait and Bella tells him to listen to his conscience. Milo does wait, and the Tweenies open their costumes together and have fun playing in them.
217	17	"Pulling"	17 January 2001
The Tweenies play some pulling games when Jake finds a rope in the garden.
218	18	"Octopus"	18 January 2001
Judy shows the Tweenies a video about an octopus and the Tweenies decide to dress up as sea creatures. They use odds and ends from the playroom and make wonderful costumes. The Tweenies sing a song about Olive the octopus, and Judy reads then a story called "Commotion in the Ocean".
219	19	"Jake's Dolly"	19 January 2001
Jake takes his dolly to Milo's house for a sleepover, but Milo thinks that Jake's dolly is silly.
220	20	"Cheeky Monkey"	22 January 2001
After imitating monkeys, the friends debate whether monkeys swing or bounce.
221	21	"Chopsticks"	23 January 2001
Fizz is put to the test when she boasts about how good she is at eating with chopsticks.
222	22	"Chinese New Year"	24 January 2001
Judy shows the Tweenies a video about Chinese New Year featuring the Lion Dance. The Tweenies find things around the playroom to make their own lion and they all do the Lion dance in the garden, which is decorated with Chinese lanterns. Judy reads the story of The Lion Dance.
223	23	"Going Underground"	25 January 2001
Judy finds her way around the London Underground.
224	24	"When I'm Older"	26 January 2001
The Tweenies talk about what they would like to be when they are older, then dress up and surprise Max.
225	25	"My Body"	29 January 2001
Bella falls over and hurts her ankle, and decides to sit down and rest. Then the Tweenies make cutouts of Jake and Bella and colour them in, and they sing Heads, Shoulders, Knees and Toes.
226	26	"Flower Shop"	30 January 2001
Some flowers are delivered for Judy, so the foursome make their own, and Bella has a flower shop.
227	27	"Scrap Metal"	31 January 2001
Max searches for scrap metal for Milo.
228	28	"Fizz is Sucking Her Thumb"	1 February 2001
Fizz pretends to be a baby and sucks her thumb and plays in her cot, but then she cannot join in activities with the others.
229	29	"Knights"	2 February 2001
Fizz produces a model knight on a horse and the Tweenies learn about knights and chivalry. They make shields and lances and prepare for a tournament. Doodles feels left out and dreams that he is a good knight who fights the baddies and rescues the princess. After his dream, he joins in the tournament – and wins!
230	30	"The Postman"	5 February 2001
The chums dream about being flying postmen, then make cards to post to each other in their cardboard postbox.
231	31	"This is Art"	7 February 2001
The Tweenies see an art gallery on television and decide to make a gallery of their own. Fizz's paintings end in disaster, but Max saves the day by putting them in a modern art gallery.
232	32	"Mosaic"	8 February 2001
Judy is making a mosaic from tiny tiles and shows the Tweenies a video of wall and floor mosaics. Judy helps them make mosaics for the playroom floor. Many shiny things in the garden go missing, including some of Judy's mosaic tiles, and Max discovers all the lost items in a magpie's nest in the tree.
233	33	"Thanks Milo"	9 February 2001
Milo tries to be good all day. He helps Fizz and Bella decorate their chairs, plays Dot Man with Jake, helps Judy finish her song and finds Doodles' missing bone. He even dresses up as a princess so that the Tweenies can sing Three Princesses. Everyone says thanks to Milo.
234	34	"Tigers"	13 February 2001
Judy gives Max a pair of tiger slippers, which inspires the Tweenies to play tiger games and sing Tiger Feet.
235	35	"Useless"	14 February 2001
Doodles tries to play with the others, but he does not know what to do. He gets upset and hides in the playhouse. Fizz wonders if dogs are useless, so Judy shows a video about helpful dogs. The Tweenies make medals for Doodles to show how useful he is and he cheers up.
236	36	"My Special Talent"	16 February 2001
Jake feels that the others are all good at something. Fizz is good at dancing, Bella can cook, Milo tells jokes and Doodles can smell things. Then Jake realises that he does have a special talent - he is the best audience!
237	37	"Telling Tales"	19 February 2001
Fizz tells tales about the others and soon Jake and Milo are not taking to Bella. Will Max's story help them be friends again?
238	38	"Snake-a-Rooney"	26 February 2001
Fizz brings a pet snake to show the others and Milo admits he is scared, so Fizz and Max help Milo to overcome his fear of snakes.
239	39	"Jake's Tantrum"	27 February 2001
Jake has a tantrum because he can't tie his shoelaces. But after a dream, he thinks that he will learn when he gets older one day.
240	40	"Funny Bella"	28 February 2001
Bella spends the day trying to make others laugh. They are delighted with this new, funny Bella, but wonder why she is acting like this. She explains she is being funny to make them like her more, but the Tweenies reassure her that they like her however she behaves.
241	41	"Man in the Moon"	1 March 2001
Max tells Jake about the Man in the Moon, and Jake thinks something is wrong when he sees the moon still out in the morning sky. He tries to find out more about the Man in the Moon and imagines meeting him and helping him put the moon away.
242	42	"Glass Blowing"	2 March 2001
A crystal present poses problems for Max when he has a smashing time with glass.
243	43	"Bananas"	5 March 2001
Doodles shows a surprising liking for Jake's bananas and one by one he takes them all away. Jake is upset because bananas are his favourite food. The Tweenies take Jake on a banana hunt, but they do not find any – until Doodles provides another surprise.
244	44	"Blues"	6 March 2001
Fizz isn't her normal, happy self. The Tweenies provide a happy song, some jokes and even a visit to Dr. Bella, but nothing makes her feel better, until Max finally finds a way to cure her blues.
245	45	"Jake's Snuggly"	7 March 2001
Bella accidentally uses Jake's comfort blanket as a duster. Judy puts it in the washing machine, but it shrinks.
246	46	"Scribbling"	8 March 2001
Milo accidentally makes a pen mark on the door, but then it comes to life as scribble-boy and teases him about what he has done. How can Milo get rid of his scribble? How will he keep his terrible secret from the others? And what will Judy say?
247	47	"Self-Portraits"	9 March 2001
The pals paint each other's portraits, Bella is unhappy with hers. But her friends manage to cheer her up.
248	48	"Again"	12 March 2001
Fizz tries the others' patience when she repeats her actions over and over again.
249	49	"Pottery Present"	22 March 2001
Max visits a pottery to get a present for someone very special.
250	50	"Jumping"	26 March 2001
When Doodles is envious of another dog's jumping abilities, Fizz tries to teach him how to jump.
251	51	"Stained Glass"	27 March 2001
Judy visits a stained glass museum in search of inspiration for a new front-door window.
252	52	"Favourite Songs"	28 March 2001
Jake cannot decide which song is his favourite when the Tweenies decide to do their own version of Top of the Pops. In the end, Jake ends up doing a Medley based on the songs he can’t choose. Note: This episode was withdrawn from distribution and broadcast in January 2013, as Max impersonates Jimmy Savile, in sensitivity to the victims of Saville's previously-unknown sexual abuse revealed post-mortem.
253	53	"Swim"	29 March 2001
Milo reveals that he can't swim and is taken on an underwater adventure.
254	54	"Shhh!"	30 March 2001
When Fizz hears a squeaking noise, she is convinced a mouse is near, so the friends go on a mouse hunt.
255	55	"Night's Falling"	2 April 2001
Jake and the others get confused about what happens when night falls.
256	56	"Green"	3 April 2001
The Tweenies hunt for green things to make a green dragon. They visit green land and turn Bella into a dragon.
257	57	"It's Mine"	4 April 2001
A catastrophe leads Doodles to claim everything is his – even the moon.
258	58	"Butterfly"	5 April 2001
Jake finds out what "having butterflies in your stomach" really means.
259	59	"School Show"	6 April 2001
Max sees a chance for stardom when he helps out at a school show.
260	60	"Grumpy Max"	9 April 2001
Max tackles a DIY shelf kit – or is it his grumpy brother?

=== Series 6 (2001-2002) ===
No. overall	No. in series	Title	Original release date
261	1	"No"	24 September 2001
The Tweenies play the yes / no game. When no-one can guess what Jake has thought of, Bella think he's cheating and calls him a baby and Max tells her it's not nice it hurts others feelings as she apologises. Jake sulks until Doodles helps him.
262	2	"Dog's Home"	25 September 2001
Max pays a visit to Battersea Dogs' Home in South London to help a friend to find her dog.
263	3	"Bees"	26 September 2001
A bee flies into the playroom and Max shows the Tweenies how to make bumblebees. When Fizz takes them into the garden, something surprising happens.
264	4	"Digger"	27 September 2001
Jake uses his new digger to look for treasure in the garden. Bella and Fizz decide to be pirate sisters, and bury a treasure box full of jewels in the sandpit to surprise Jake. But when Jake digs up the box and the treasure is missing, everyone is surprised! Where has it gone?
265	5	"Big Box"	28 September 2001
Jake finds Milo playing in a big cardboard box. Milo is pretending that it is a submarine and then an aeroplane. He stays in the box for story time while the others describe the pictures to him. Then they all join him in the box and pretend that it is a runaway train!
266	6	"Slug"	1 October 2001
Fizz goes to the toilet, and comes across a slug. Bella is the only one who likes it, so she tries to convince the others that slugs are great.
267	7	"Ciao Bella"	2 October 2001
When Bella receives a postcard from her friends in Venice, she teaches everyone to say 'ciao'. They watch a video about Venice, make Italian food and ride in gondolas.
268	8	"Jake's Been Sick"	3 October 2001
Max asks Jake to put away some cooking apples for him, but he decides to eat one (without knowing it is a cooking apple). He starts to feel very ill and is eventually sick. Fizz and Milo are not very sympathetic, but Nurse Bella is.
269	9	"Restaurant"	4 October 2001
Max helps out at a restaurant and demonstrates how to make pizza.
270	10	"Sardines"	5 October 2001
Max suggests that the Tweenies play a game called sardines. Milo hides first in the cupboard, followed by Bella, Fizz, Jake and Doodles. Max arrives and tells them a story, but they still do not know how the game ends!
271	11	"No Shoes"	8 October 2001
Max has mopped the floor, so the Tweenies have to remove their muddy boots before they can play indoors, but then somebody steals them.
272	12	"Pinching"	9 October 2001
The Tweenies are pinching each other Bella ruins Milo's jigsaw when she tries to help him Fizz tries to help Bella with her jigsaw and tells her to go away Jake annoys Fizz when he won't leave her alone and Jake gets upset with Milo during story time and Judy tells them pinching is wrong.
273	13	"Watermill"	10 October 2001
Max visits a watermill where he grinds his own wheat, makes his own flour, bakes bread and eats it.
274	14	"Pajama Time"	11 October 2001
The Tweenies have been wearing pajamas. Doodles get Fizz muddy, so she puts her pajamas on. Bella's pants rip, so she puts her pajamas on. Milo has his pajamas on, but Jake doesn't, so Milo gets him some dressing up pajamas.
275	15	"Keep Out"	12 October 2001
Milo's friends get their own back when he builds a castle in the garden and tells them to keep out. They build a house in the playroom and tell him to keep out.
276	16	"Careful, Don't Be Clumsy"	15 October 2001
Milo learns to take his time, to stop being so clumsy.
277	17	"A Walk in the Woods"	16 October 2001
While out for a walk in the woods, Max joins a teddy bears' picnic.
278	18	"Max's Stiff Neck"	17 October 2001
The Tweenies pretend to have stiff bodies when Max suffers from a stiff neck.
279	19	"I Hate It"	18 October 2001
Fizz wants to go on a picnic and Judy says no due to rain and she starts hating everything especially Milo Bella and Jake when she has a dream about them 3 hating everything and telling her to go away she notices she was wrong.
280	20	"Leaky Beanbag"	19 October 2001
Jake dreams that his beanbag has leaked all over the playroom.
281	21	"Blade of Grass"	22 October 2001
Jake takes a closer look at the grass in the garden, while Fizz brings her lucky charm bracelet to playgroup.
282	22	"Neighbours"	23 October 2001
Bella and Jake have a problem with very noisy neighbours, but what can they do about it?
283	23	"Videotape"	24 October 2001
Poor Fizz is very upset when her special video that shows her dancing in front of lots of people behind sunflowers and wearing a fairy costume is damaged. She and Judy try to fix it while Bella, Milo, Jake and Max help her recreate her dance.
284	24	"Coaches & Carriages"	25 October 2001
Max takes a ride on a stagecoach when he visits a coach museum.
285	25	"Arrows"	26 October 2001
When the Tweenies play at being Robin Hood and his Merry Men, the garden becomes a magical forest.
286	26	"Desert"	29 October 2001
Judy's desert story takes the Tweenies on an adventure in search of buried treasure.
287	27	"Donkey Village"	30 October 2001
Judy visits a special village for donkeys.
288	28	"No Words"	31 October 2001
Bella uses the pictures on a willow-pattern plate to help tell a story.
289	29	"Pigs"	1 November 2001
Max tells the classic story of the three little pigs and the big bad wolf. Meanwhile Jake and Doodles start to feel very greedy.
290	30	"Go to Sleep Fizz"	2 November 2001
Fizz finds it difficult to get to sleep. What will make her go to sleep?
291	31	"Milo's Rocket"	5 November 2001
Milo leads a mission to Mars, assisted by Jupiter Jake and Daring Dog Doodles.
292	32	"Cut"	6 November 2001
Max uses his video camera to film a day in the life of the Tweenies – but nothing goes the way he planned.
293	33	"Steam Train"	7 November 2001
Max visits a steam railway.
294	34	"Stripes"	8 November 2001
The Tweenies are making patterned wrapping paper. Bella tells Jake to draw stripes, but Jake does not know what stripes are. Doodles introduces him to a zebra and they visit the land of stripes, where everything is stripy, so Jake learns how to paint his stripy wrapping paper.
295	35	"Car Journey"	9 November 2001
Jake has fun in the car with his mum whilst stuck in a traffic jam. Meanwhile, the same cannot be said for the rest of the gang. Bella, Fizz and Milo are all bored at playgroup without Jake.
296	36	"Milo's Sweets"	12 November 2001
Milo brings in a big bag of pick-and-mix sweets, but he will not share them with the other Tweenies. He refuses to have melon with them, and then eats so many sweets, he starts feeling sick. He decides to give away his last three sweets to the others and eat melon instead!
297	37	"All at Sea"	13 November 2001
Judy is on holiday in Scotland, bobbing up and down in a boat.
298	38	"Spots"	16 November 2001
Jake tries to find out where the spots on the new playroom curtains have gone. The others make spotty masks and sing a spotty song. Max explains the spotty curtain mystery.
299	39	"Ants"	19 November 2001
When Milo finds ants in the kitchen, he and Fizz use the computer to learn all about them. They use their magnifying glasses to look at them closely and the Tweenies imagine they are in an anthill dancing with the ants. Bella catches the ants in a jam jar and the Tweenies release them in the garden - much to Judy's relief!
300	40	"Highlands & Islands"	20 November 2001
Judy learns Scottish dancing in a castle and goes in search of fluffy rabbits.
301	41	"Snow"	21 November 2001
The Tweenies want it to snow and play snowy games inside, then they wish for it and it really does snow in the garden.
302	42	"What Makes Winter?"	23 November 2001
It's a frosty day and the Tweenies learn about winter. They make a big winter collage from things they collect in the garden, while they sing What Makes Winter. Judy reads them a story called Ridiculous, by Michael Coleman, about a tortoise who wants to explore winter rather than hibernate.
303	43	"Bats"	26 November 2001
The friends learn all about bats and Max invents a game about them.
304	44	"King of the Castle"	27 November 2001
Max makes a castle in the garden, with Doodles as a dragon.
305	45	"Decorating"	28 November 2001
The Tweenies help Judy and Max decorate the playroom, then agree that it looked better before.
306	46	"Say Cheese"	29 November 2001
Judy turns her hand to cheese-making on a trip to Cheddar Gorge.
307	47	"Oh, I Forgot!"	30 November 2001
A visit from Max's sister Polly leads to confusion for both of them.
308	48	"Crocodile Tears"	3 December 2001
Bella and Fizz learn about crocodiles, while Jake has a bad case of crocodile tears.
309	49	"Up & Away"	4 December 2001
Max flies in a hot-air balloon. Note: The hot-air Balloon that Max flies in is the one from the BBC One "Balloon" idents.
310	50	"Wings"	5 December 2001
Fizz dress up as a butterfly, Bella puts on her fairy princess costume, and Milo pretends to be an eagle – but Jake cannot find an outfit with wings on. The others pretend to fly in the garden, so Jake dresses as Dotman to join in their game. Max buys them all new costumes with wings on, but they have done enough flying for one day.
311	51	"Checks"	6 December 2001
Bella brings her check quilt into the playgroup and shows the others how to make check patterns. Max tiles the kitchen floor with a check pattern, Fizz makes a check painting and Milo and Jake play a game with check tiles.
312	52	"Don't Go Max"	7 December 2001
The Tweenies think that Max and Doodles are going to leave them forever.
313	53	"Hanukkah"	10 December 2001
The friends learn about Hanukkah, the Jewish festival of lights, and decide to hold their own Hanukkah party. They watch a video about Hanukkah, make potato latkes, play dreidel, make a menorah, hear the story of Hanukkah and open presents.
314	54	"Muddle Day"	11 December 2001
When Milo puts his coat on back to front, the Tweenies decide to do everything muddled up. They play muddled up hide-and-seek, do a muddled up painting and muddle up the playroom.
315	55	"Jake's Mountain"	12 December 2001
Judy visits a power station in the middle of a Scottish mountain.
316	56	"Cranes"	13 December 2001
Max finds the other Tweenies useful when they become cranes for the day.
317	57	"In Between"	14 December 2001
Jake finds out the meaning of "in between", with the help of Doodles.
318	58	"White Christmas"	26 December 2001
Jake is sick in bed on Christmas Day, so his friends come to visit to make him feel better.
319	59	"Searching for Santa"	27 December 2001
Max has some presents for Santa, but first he has to find him.
320	60	"The Name Game"	28 December 2001
Bella has found out that her name means beautiful and the other Tweenies use the computer to find out the origins of their names. They then put on a show for Max and Bella to guess what their names mean.
321	61	"New Arrival"	31 December 2001
A new dog has came to playgroup named Izzles she steals Doodles bones she knocks water over Fizz's painting she takes Bella's lion she ruins Max's garden and she frightens Jake.
322	62	"Big Brave Jake"	1 January 2002
Jake does not like Izzles as she kept upsetting him so Bella lets him chose a story and Milo and Fizz tell Jake to be brave around Izzles.
323	63	"Doodles is Strange"	2 January 2002
Doodles is jealous of Izzles that Max sends him to bed but when Izzles accidentally knocks the biscuits out of Bella's hands Doodles gets put outside for time out making Jake upset and Judy tells Max not to be hard on Doodles and apologises to him.
324	64	"Slippery Slopes"	2 January 2002
Max tries his hand at skiing, but finds that it is not as easy as he thought.
325	65	"Honest Doodles"	3 January 2002
Doodles teaches Izzles too much he makes her ruin Fizz's painting he makes Izzles steal a sandwich Judy sends her to the blanket and the 2 of them knocked everything down until Bella finds out the whole truth.
326	66	"Coming or Going"	4 January 2002
Max tells the Tweenies he and Judy will be deciding if Izzles should stay or go until they all want her to stay.
327	67	"Whales"	7 January 2002
Jake is curious about whales. He wants to know how big a blue whale really is, and tries to find out.
328	68	"Tom Thumb"	8 January 2002
The Tweenies imagine they shrink to Tom Thumb's size and explore the playroom. They discover that it is frightening being small.
329	69	"Car Boot Sale"	9 January 2002
Max takes some of his belongings to a car-boot sale – but will he manage to sell anything?
330	70	"Light & Heavy"	10 January 2002
It's up and down day for the Tweenies when Max's surprise does not work out as planned.
331	71	"What a Day!"	11 January 2002
Every time the Tweenies get changed to go outside, the weather changes. They put on their sun hats and it starts to rain, they dress up for the rain and it gets windy and when they get out into the garden, it starts to thunder.
332	72	"Blaming the Wrong Person"	28 January 2002
Fizz finds her clay dinosaur toy missing, and she and Bella accuse Milo and when Bella decides to look in Milo's belongings Max tells her off until Judy explains she had the dinosaur.
333	73	"The Five Wishes"	29 January 2002
Jake's wishes all come true, but for some reason they don't make him happy. What can possibly be wrong?
334	74	"Max & Manx"	30 January 2002
Max goes fishing with his friend Brian on the Isle of Man. Unfortunately, Max does not turn out to be a great fisherman. After seeing how herrings are turned into kippers, Max meets some Manx cats.
335	75	"Handyman Milo"	31 January 2002
Milo fancies himself as a bit of a handyman. He tries to mend Max's clock but breaks it instead. Will Max be cross with him?
336	76	"Lost Your Smile?"	1 February 2002
Bella wants someone to help her find her smile again. Perhaps the day's story "Where's Your Smile Crocodile?" will help.
337	77	"Percussion"	4 February 2002
The friends learn all about percussion instruments and Milo wants to play them all.
338	78	"Strings"	5 February 2002
The friends learn all about stringed instruments and make music pictures.
339	79	"Brass"	6 February 2002
The friends learn all about brass instruments, play around, and Bella and the Brass Notes perform their latest hit.
340	80	"Woodwind"	7 February 2002
The friends learn all about woodwind instruments. While Judy makes music, all Max can produce is a terrible noise!
341	81	"Orchestra"	8 February 2002
Max is invited to play with an orchestra, and it all goes with a bang.
342	82	"Looking for Fairies"	13 February 2002
Max goes to the Isle of Man in search of fairies. On the way, he takes a walk in the woods, and travels by horse tram and steam train. But will he find the fairies? Note: This episode premiered two days after the day that CBeebies was launched.
343	83	"What's in the Box?"	14 February 2002
Milo's box contains an amazing secret, and the others cannot believe what is inside.
344	84	"Playing Together"	15 February 2002
The Tweenies refuse to play together, so they play on their own. Milo plays snap, Bella reads a book, Fizz has a tea party and Jake plays with a beach ball. When Max reads a story called It's My Turn, they all become friends again.
345	85	"The Present"	18 February 2002
Bella gives Fizz a stick as a present, and Fizz finds out just how useful it can be.
346	86	"Circus"	19 February 2002
Today, Max is helping out at Zippos Circus but he isn't sure what exactly he is going to be doing. He tries out some circus skills but he isn't very good at them. Afterwards, Max reads a story called Bear On A Bike. Then, Max has a job to do, giving out the circus programmes to the circus audience. He has a wonderful time at Zippos Circus.
347	87	"I Want One If Bella Wants One"	20 February 2002
Fizz decides to be a copycat and copies Bella in everything she does.
348	88	"Champions!"	21 February 2002
The Tweenies discover what their skills are and what they are champions at.
349	89	"Oh, My Hair!"	22 February 2002
Fizz has a hair-raising day as she tries to decide whether long or short hair is best.
350	90	"Fizz's Surprise"	25 February 2002
Fizz excitedly tells everybody that her mother is about to have a baby, and the baby is expected that day. Every time the phone rings, she thinks it will be her daddy with the news.
351	91	"Welcome Baby"	26 February 2002
Fizz celebrates the birth of her baby brother and makes him a card, Jake and Bella play mummies and daddies, while Milo has a surprise in store for Doodles – a new kennel.
352	92	"Feeling Let Down"	27 February 2002
Fizz is fed up with her new baby brother. She is tired and in a bad mood. Bella and Jake make a care for their baby doll.
353	93	"Prickly Fizz"	28 February 2002
Milo has made a kennel for Doodles but it's too small for him! He thinks that a mouse could live in it, if he had a pet mouse! Jake and Bella are having a party for Rocky the baby because it's his birthday today. Fizz and Milo are invited to the party but Fizz doesn't feel like having a party and Milo is busy. Milo gets some water and biscuits for his pet mouse, even though he doesn't have one! He tells Fizz that if he leaves the food and house in the garden, a little mouse might come and eat the food! Bella tells Fizz that the party is ready but Fizz still doesn't want to go! She gets given a baby elephant by Bella and Bella takes Fizz to the party. Milo puts the house and food in the garden ready for the mouse and he comes back into the playroom for the party. Milo gets given a baby lion by Bella and they all sing Happy Birthday to baby Rocky. Then they all sing The Baby's In The Cot but Fizz doesn't want to be the baby's sister. She leaves the game and goes into the playhouse. She is very annoyed because she has a new baby brother in her house. Doodles tells Fizz that Max hasn't got any babies in his house so Fizz tells Doodles that she is going to stay with him and Max forever. Back outside, Izzles looks inside Milo's small house and gets hurt. She tells Milo and Milo thinks that there is finally a mouse in his small house but there isn't. Jake and Bella go outside and Bella tells Milo that there is a hedgehog inside the house. Milo tries to feed the hedgehog a biscuit but Bella tells him that hedgehogs don't eat biscuits. Jake goes off to get Max and Max comes over to look at the hedgehog. Then Max goes back into the playroom to have a word with Fizz. Fizz tells Max that she is packing her toys ready to live with him and Doodles. Max tells Fizz that her mum and dad would miss her very much if she came to live with him and Doodles. He also tells Fizz that her mum and dad love her very much, even though they look after Fizz's baby brother lots. Max cheers up Fizz by reading her a story called The Birthday Presents and then he takes Fizz out into the garden to look at the hedgehog. Max thinks that the hedgehog isn't feeling very well so he asks Fizz if she could look after the hedgehog until it feels better. The other Tweenies bring baby Rocky outside so that he can see the hedgehog and Fizz sings the hedgehog a lullaby to help it go to sleep. Maybe Fizz doesn't want to stay with Max and Doodles after all.
354	94	"Big Sister"	1 March 2002
Fizz enjoys looking after the hedgehog, and when they have to let it go, she is happy to play with the baby dolly. She realises that babies need big sisters.
355	95	"Who Can Help?"	4 March 2002
When Milo and Jake play firemen, their fire truck keeps breaking. They ask Bella to fix it, but she tapes it up. They ask Fizz, who says talk to it nicely. The boys end up telling Judy and she fixes it.
356	96	"One to Win"	6 March 2002
Max and Judy have a race against each other, with Max driving a modern car and Judy driving an old-fashioned one. It is obvious who will win - or is it?
357	97	"It's the Thought That Counts"	7 March 2002
Bella discovers that it is Judy's birthday, and the Tweenies decide to secretly bake her a cake, but Max is trying to fix the washing machine at the same time and the cake goes wrong. Max explains to Bella that it is the thought that counts.
358	98	"Dancing Feet"	8 March 2002
The Tweenies watch different types of dancing on the computer and put on a show. Fizz loves the Indian dancing, while Milo does Hungarian dancing and Bella does flamenco. Jake feels left out because he thinks he cannot dance properly, but he finds that he has got a special talent for Greek dancing.
359	99	"Let's Be Each Other"	11 March 2002
The Tweenies decide it would be great fun to be each other, so they swap clothes and there toys. Bella pretends to be Milo, she gets his scooter. Milo pretends to be Fizz and wears a tutu. Fizz is Jake, who wears his spotty cape. Jake is Bella, making him the oldest. Doodles is Izzles, being naughty. Izzles is Judy, telling everyone what to do.
360	100	"Milo Wants to Know"	12 March 2002
Judy asks a long list of questions when she visits the Science Museum.
361	101	"Goats & Trolls"	13 March 2002
The Tweenies learn about goats and play with a pretend troll called Bogsnort.
362	102	"Kangaroos"	14 March 2002
Jake dresses up as a kangaroo with help from Judy, and dances a kangaroo can-can with the others.
363	103	"Why Do People Do Bad Things?"	15 March 2002
The Tweenies are horrified to learn that somebody kicked Doodles while he was on a walk. Bella also reveals that some of her neighbours have been rude to new neighbours because of the colour of their skin.
364	104	"Being Really Old"	18 March 2002
Bella calls Doodles and the others on her meeting table. They are worried about Max's old age, so they decide to help him – with disastrous consequences.
365	105	"The Giant's Breakfast"	19 March 2002
The Tweenies make breakfast for a giant, and Dot Man and Oval Man go on an adventure.
366	106	"Which Way to Turn?"	20 March 2002
Bella makes a magical telescope which transports the Tweenies to a magical blue forest, where they all lose each other!
367	107	"Moving House"	21 March 2002
Max helps a family move to a new house.
368	108	"Brushes"	22 March 2002
Jake and Fizz decide to brush the dogs in exchange for some biscuits, but when the dogs do not get their biscuits, they come up with a plan to get their own back.
369	109	"Imaginary Pet"	25 March 2002
Fizz is upset that she does not have a pony, so Jake suggests that she pretends she has one.
370	110	"Off to the Sun"	26 March 2002
It is holiday time for Max and he is up, up and away!
371	111	"Happy Holiday"	27 March 2002
Max has fun on holiday in sunny Tenerife, visiting an aquapark, an eagle park and Loro Parque.
372	112	"What Makes Spring?"	28 March 2002
The Tweenies look for signs of spring in the garden and make a spring collage.
373	113	"Clock Shock!"	2 April 2002
The Tweenie clock is behaving very strangely, so Max tries to fix it.
374	114	"Listen"	3 April 2002
The Tweenies spend the day playing a listening game, Chinese whispers, with each other, but are so engrossed they fail to listen to Max's instructions properly.
375	115	"Carnival Time"	4 April 2002
Max has the chance to join in the carnival.
376	116	"No Kissing"	5 April 2002
Milo sprains his wrist after having a carry on with his brother.
377	117	"Wedding Day"	5 April 2002
The Tweenies imagine a wedding where some old friends turn up.
378	118	"Vegetables are Fun"	8 April 2002
Max's home-grown vegetables prove very useful.
379	119	"Swapsies"	8 April 2002
The friends swap toys with each other, with some interesting results.
380	120	"Teamwork"	9 April 2002
Judy is sick leaving Max in charge Milo ruins Fizz's painting and he looks for his car and knocks Bella's sand castle over and she attacks him with chousins and Jake bangs his knee until Polly comes to the rescue.
381	121	"Home Again"	10 April 2002
Judy returns to the land where she was born.
382	122	"Something New"	11 April 2002
The gang all learn to do something new.
383	123	"Opera"	12 April 2002
The friends learn about opera, and plan a wonderful surprise for Judy.
384	124	"Prairie Dogs"	15 April 2002
The Tweenies enjoy their cowboy game, but it is not much fun for Doodles and Izzles.
385	125	"Izzles isn't Bouncy Anymore"	16 April 2002
When Izzles goes off her food, Doodles solves the problem.
386	126	"Mixed-Up Animals"	17 April 2002
The Tweenies meet some very strange animals.
387	127	"Wedding Party"	18 April 2002
Judy is invited to her friends' wedding, but she is not sure what they would like for a wedding present. Judy decides on a Bodhrán, which is shown being made by Malakey, a master bodhran maker.
388	128	"Invisible"	19 April 2002
The Tweenies imagine what it would be like to disappear.
389	129	"Gimme Five"	22 April 2002
The Tweenies and Max put on a show for Judy, but Max finds it hard to keep up.
390	130	"What Makes Summer?"	24 April 2002
Max and the Tweenies make a summer collage. Note: This is the last episode where Emma Weaver voices Bella, though she reprised her role in Night-Time Magic and Jungle Adventure, and the Be Safe shorts.

== Welsh episodes ==
In 2002, the BBC dubbed several episodes into Welsh for S4C (BBC provides some programming to the Welsh channel). Dubbing was done by actors including John Ogwen and Jennifer Vaughan.

Episode No.	Welsh title	Original title
1	Gwledd Bwstyfil	Monster Nosh
2	Llun Judy	Judy's Painting
3	Diwali	Diwali
4	Sypreis Fawr Bella	Bella's Big Surprise
5	I Fyny'r Mynydd	Up the Mountain
6	Pawb Yn Sownd	Pulling
7	Fy Nghorff	My Body
8	Eirth Gwyn	Polar Bears
9	Diog	Lazy
10	Neidio	Lazy
11	Sanna Gwirion Milo	Milo's Odd Socks
12	Draig	Dragon
13	Ffyrnig Fel Llew	Fierce as a Lion

== Tweenies Christmas Countdown (2001) ==
No.	Original release date
1	1 December 2001
Day 1 of the countdown.
2	2 December 2001
Day 2 of the countdown.
3	3 December 2001
Day 3 of the countdown.
4	4 December 2001
Day 4 of the countdown.
5	5 December 2001
Day 5 of the countdown.
6	6 December 2001
Day 6 of the countdown.
7	7 December 2001
Day 7 of the countdown.
8	8 December 2001
Day 8 of the countdown.
9	9 December 2001
Day 9 of the countdown.
10	10 December 2001
Day 10 of the countdown.
11	11 December 2001
Day 11 of the countdown.
12	12 December 2001
Day 12 of the countdown.
13	13 December 2001
Day 13 of the countdown.
14	14 December 2001
Day 14 of the countdown.
15	15 December 2001
Day 15 of the countdown.
16	16 December 2001
Day 16 of the countdown.
17	17 December 2001
Day 17 of the countdown.
18	18 December 2001
Day 18 of the countdown.
19	19 December 2001
Day 19 of the countdown.
20	20 December 2001
Day 20 of the countdown.
21	21 December 2001
Day 21 of the countdown.
22	22 December 2001
Day 22 of the countdown.
23	23 December 2001
Day 23 of the countdown.
24	24 December 2001
Day 24 of the countdown.
25	25 December 2001
Day 25 of the countdown.

== Be Safe with the Tweenies ==
A series of special short episodes focusing on safety, entitled Be Safe with the Tweenies, were shown on CBeebies and BBC Two between 2002 and 2009.

No.	Title
1	"Cleaning Materials"
Fizz finds bottles in the kitchen cupboard while playing shops, not realising they are cleaning materials.
2	"Leaving Toys Lying Around"
Max comes back from the shops and trips on Jake's aeroplane, not noticing it there from carrying a bag. Bella fights with snakes and leaves them on the floor to go to Fizz's tea party; Milo nearly falls over them on his scooter. Doodles ends up falling while chasing Izzles for his ball; she puts the ball on the floor, making Fizz fall over. Judy tells the others never to leave toys on the floor.
3	"Throwing"
Max wants to make a video of the Tweenies in the garden, however, because they are throwing things outdoors, he ends up filming them throwing things instead. He tells them to go inside to watch the video on the TV. After discussing with the Tweenies as to what they did wrong, he tells them never to throw things.
4	"Garden Shed"
Bella and Jake want to play with gardening things from Max's garden shed.
5	"Swings"
Izzles finds out the hard way that it's not safe to push too high and to stand in front of a swing. So Jake and Doodles help her to play safely with the swing.
6	"Slide"
Milo upsets the others at the slide. He pushes past Fizz to get to the top of the slide and shoves Bella out the way when she was due to take her turn, and he kicks Jake's bottom on descent at the bottom of the slide from not waiting for Jake to get up first. Max tells Milo to sit inside. Izzles and Doodles tell him it is not nice to hurt people's feelings, and how to play safely on the slide.
7	"Matches"
Jake finds a box of matches left by the plumber and learns from Good Jake that you must never play with matches.
8	"Don't Go There"
A fairy warns Fizz not to hide in an old fridge that is in the garden, because she might not get out of it.
9	"Lost"
Max gets lost at the garden centre while getting a present for Sophie and Toby's dad's birthday.
10	"Road Safety"
Max goes to the park with his friends Connor and Grace and they need to cross some busy roads to get there.
11	"Dogs"
Izzles has been bitten by a dog, and Jake learns how to be safe around dogs.
12	"Candles"
It is Judy's birthday and the Tweenies give her a scented candle as a present. One of Judy's birthday candles wasn't fully blown out and it re-ignites. The Tweenies are told never to play with candles after Bella and Milo are caught trying to light the scented candle with the birthday candle.
13	"Fire Safety"
Fire can be very unsafe, so the Tweenies help us and children to understand this with Milo pretending to be the fire.
14	"Travelling by Train"
Trains can be dangerous if you are not careful, so the Tweenies see if Max knows how to be safe on trains with his friends Samuel and Laura.
15	"Electric Sockets and Cables"
Milo, Fizz and Jake learn from Bella pretending to be her gran that electric sockets and cables are dangerous while they put on a disco.
16	"Knives"
Jake misses Bella, Milo and Fizz's play about King Arthur and learns about how knives can be dangerous from Judy while trying to find a sword. Note: This episode was banned from broadcast due to the use of knives.
17	"Pond"
The Tweenies learn about safety around ponds with Max and his friends Samuel and Maya, who are going to feed the ducks.
18	"Scissors"
Jake learns about being safe with scissors while making a crown for Izzles.
19	"Rivers"
The Tweenies learn about safety around rivers with Max, Jake and Fiona who play Poohsticks.
20	"Dialing 999"
Bella tells the others about a real emergency while Milo, Fizz and Jake play at being a firefighter, doctor and policeman.
21	"Railway Lines"
Max tells the others how to be safe near a railway and Judy tries to make up a song about it with her guitar.
22	"Hot Cooker"
Jake and Milo learn about being safe around hot cookers and other hot things in a kitchen.
23	"Kettle and Teapot"
Bella thinks she can make a real pot of tea for the toys. However, this is not an entirely safe plan.
24	"Canal"
The Tweenies learn about safety around canals with Max, Emma and her granny.
25	"Doors and Windows"
Bella and Milo learn about safety around doors and windows while playing with paper aeroplanes.
26	"Beach"
Max goes to the beach and helps to teach about safety by the sea.

== Extended 40-minute episodes ==
In 2001, following the success of the Teletubbies omnibus editions which were broadcast on the BBC on Sunday mornings, 18 40-minute episodes of the Tweenies were produced, which featured the Tweenies at home instead of playgroup, usually in their bedroom, talking about recent & past episodes from Series 4-6 which were originally broadcast in 2000–2001, with clips. These were shown intermittently in the UK on BBC Two in 2001 and BBC One in 2001 and 2003. They were last repeated in 2007 on CBeebies.

No.	Title	Original release date
1	"Machines"	30 September 2001
2	"Urgh!"	7 October 2001
3	"It's Catching"	14 October 2001
4	"Sleeping"	21 October 2001
5	"Things We Brought In"	28 October 2001
6	"Dressed Up"	4 November 2001
7	"Journey"	11 November 2001
8	"Crazy"	18 November 2001
9	"It's Getting Cold"	25 November 2001
10	"Building Things"	2 December 2001
11	"It Turned Out Alright"	9 December 2001
12	"Odd Things Happen"	16 December 2001
13	"Disaster"	30 December 2001
14	"Mistaken"	6 January 2002
15	"Big and Small"	13 January 2002
16	"Noise"	20 January 2002
17	"New Dog"	8 March 2003
18	"Scary Adventures"	15 March 2003

== VHS titles ==
Title	BBCV Catalogue Number	Release date
Ready to Play with the Tweenies	BBCV 6839	18 October 1999
Tweenies: Song Time!	BBCV 6914	18 October 1999
Tweenies: Song Time! 2	BBCV 6944	27 March 2000
Tweenies: Animal Friends	BBCV 6873	27 March 2000
Tweenies: Party Games, Laughs & Giggles	BBCV 7007	9 October 2000
Tweenies: Merry Tweenie Christmas	BBCV 7008	30 October 2000
Tweenies: Song Time Is Fab-A-Rooney!	BBCV 7139	19 March 2001
Tweenies: Colours Are Magic!	BBCV 7140	19 March 2001
Tweenies: Live!	BBCV 7233	23 July 2001
Tweenies: Songs & Surprises	BBCV 7187	8 October 2001
Tweenies: Enchanted Toyshop	BBCV 7186	5 November 2001
Tweenies: Doodles' New Friend	BBCV 7283	18 March 2002
Tweenies: Music Is Pop-A-Rooney	BBCV 7347	1 July 2002
Tweenies: Everybody Panto	BBCV 7349	14 October 2002
Tweenies: Live! - The Christmas Present	BBCV 7383	4 November 2002
Tweenies: It's Messy Time	BBCV 7348	16 December 2002
Tweenies: Let's Play	BBCV 7462	14 July 2003
Tweenies: Night-Time Magic	BBCV 7490	27 October 2003
Tweenies: Let's All Make Music	BBCV 7535	22 March 2004
Tweenies: Jungle Adventure	BBCV 7566	25 October 2004
Tweenies: Fizz!	BBCV 7692	7 March 2005

== DVD titles ==
Title	BBCDVD Catalogue Number	Region 2 release date
Tweenies: Ready to Play with the Tweenies & Song Time!	BBCDVD 1018	3 April 2000
Tweenies: Animal Friends & Party Games, Laughs & Giggles	BBCDVD 1026	13 November 2000
Tweenies: Merry Tweenie Christmas	BBCDVD 1027	4 December 2000
Tweenies: Song Time! 2 & Song Time Is Fab-A-Rooney!	BBCDVD 1082	8 October 2001
Tweenies: Colours Are Magic!	BBCDVD 1081	14 October 2002
Tweenies: It's Messy Time	BBCDVD 1196	23 December 2002
Tweenies: Let's Play	BBCDVD 1270; BBCDVD 2463 (Carry Me DVD)	14 July 2003; 2 July 2007 (Carry Me DVD)
Tweenies: Music Is Pop-A-Rooney	BBCDVD 1271	14 July 2003
Tweenies: Party Games, Laughs & Giggles	BBCDVD 1272	14 July 2003
Tweenies: Night-Time Magic	BBCDVD 1313	27 October 2003
Tweenies: Let's All Make Music	BBCDVD 1419	22 March 2004
Tweenies: Jungle Adventure	BBCDVD 1522	25 October 2004
Tweenies: Fizz!	BBCDVD 1661	7 March 2005
Tweenies: It's Christmas!	BBCDVD 1780	14 November 2005
Tweenies: Song Time! The Complete Collection	BBCDVD 1945	6 February 2006
Tweenies: The Ultimate Christmas Collection	BBCDVD 2181	6 November 2006
Tweenies: Practical Jokes & other stories (Carry Me DVD)	BBCDVD 2360	26 March 2007
Tweenies: Messy Time Magic!	BBCDVD 2793	1 September 2008
