= Eric Underwood (dancer) =

American British ballet dancer, model and actor

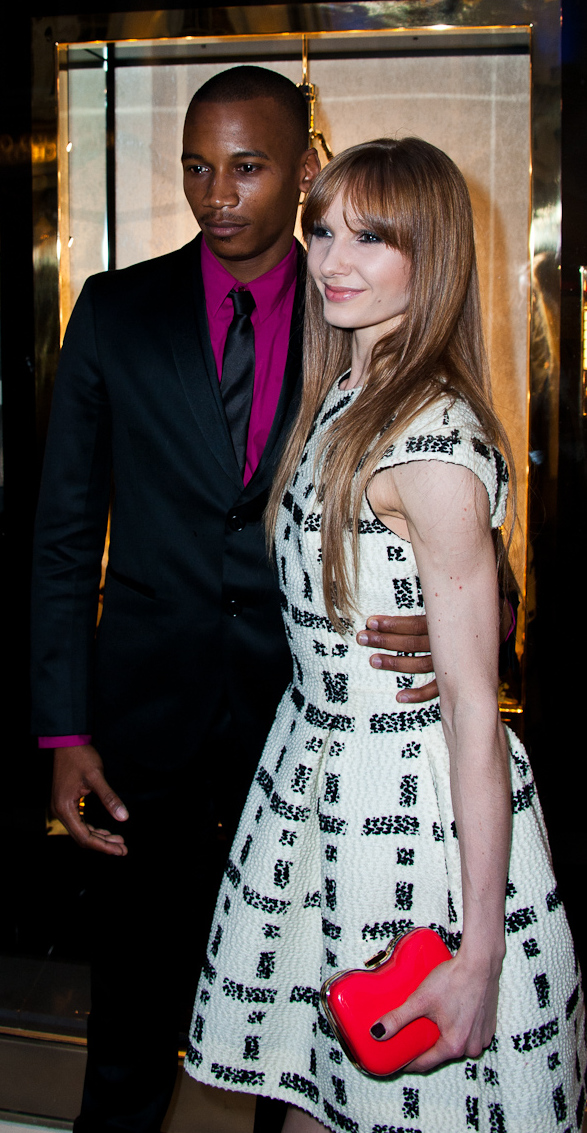
- Underwood with fellow dancer Melissa Hamilton in 2014
- Born: 1983 or 1984 (age 41–42); Maryland
- Citizenship: American; British
- Education: School of American Ballet
- Occupations: ballet dancer; model; actor
- Career
- Former groups: Dance Theater of Harlem; American Ballet Theatre; The Royal Ballet

Eric Underwood is an American British ballet dancer, model and actor. He was a soloist with The Royal Ballet until he left the company in August 2017. He was one of the few black dancers in the company.

== Early life ==
Underwood was born in Maryland, and was raised in a poor suburb in Maryland. He has two paternal half siblings. There were gangs violence and gun crimes in the neighborhood, but Underwood stated "we were loved and appreciated at home." He also stated police officers would visit his school once a week to build "positive association" with police.

Underwood danced at home as a child, but did not start formal trainings until he turned 14. His mother wanted to send him to study acting at Suitland High School Center for Visual and Performing Arts, as it was "more promising" than mainstream schools, but Underwood got stage fright at his audition. As he was leaving, he saw a ballet class and asked the teacher to let him try. He ended up training at the school as a ballet student and was one of the few boys in the class. A year later, he received a scholarship to train at School of American Ballet in New York City, where he was the only African-American student in his class. He graduated in 2000.

== Career ==
Underwood joined the Dance Theater of Harlem after he graduated, and became a soloist by the end of his first season. He joined the American Ballet Theatre in 2003, where he and Misty Copeland were the only black dancers. In 2006, he joined The Royal Ballet in London as a First Artist, having previously been spotted while he was on tour in London. During his first season, he originated roles in Wayne McGregor's Chroma and Christopher Wheeldon's DGV: Danse à grande vitesse. He was promoted to soloist in 2008, and continued to work with Wheeldon and McGregor, and created roles in productions such as Aeternum, Alice's Adventures in Wonderland, Infra and Woolf Works. He had also participated in the Royal Ballet's community outreach program. Throughout his time in the Royal Ballet, he was one of the few black dancers in the company. In 2017, Underwood left the company.

In 2015, Underwood posted a video of him applying make up to ballet shoes, as there were only pink and beige options. He then worked with Bloch, a ballet shoes manufacturer to produce ballet shoes that match dancers of color's skin-tones.

In 2019, Underwood played Admetus in Cats, the film adaptation of the musical of the same name. He appeared in many dance sequences but had no spoken lines. He was set to play Albert/Kevin in the 2020 revival of the play Clybourne Park in Park Theatre, London, though its entire run was delayed due to the 2019-20 coronavirus pandemic. Underwood is also a model.

== Selected repertoire ==
Underwood's repertoire with American Ballet Theatre and The Royal Ballet includes:

- After the Rain pas de deux
- Afternoon of a Faun
- Agon
- Rasputin in Anastasia
- High Brahmin in La Bayadère
- Officer in Cinderella
- The Four Temperaments
- Gaoler and Gentleman in Manon
- Serenade
- Von Rothbart in Swan Lake
- Apollo in Sylvia
- Mrs Pettitoes in Tales of Beatrix Potter

=== Created roles ===
- DGV: Danse à grande vitesse
- Acis and Galatea
- Aeternum
- The Caterpillar in Alice's Adventures in Wonderland
- Chroma
- Electric Counterpoint
- Infra
- Live Fire Exercise
- Multiverse
- Obsidian Tear
- Raven Girl
- Tetractys
- Woolf Works

== Personal life ==
Underwood is a naturalised British citizen.
