= Community for Creative Non-Violence v. Reid =

- Supreme Court of the United States

Argued March 29, 1989 Decided June 5, 1989
- Full case name: Community for Creative Non-Violence, et al. v. James Earl Reid
- Citations: 490 U.S. 730 (more) 109 S. Ct. 2166; 104 L. Ed. 2d 811; 1989 U.S. LEXIS 2727; 57 U.S.L.W. 4607; 10 U.S.P.Q.2D (BNA) 1985; Copy. L. Rep. (CCH) ¶ 26,425; 16 Media L. Rep. 1769

Case history
- Prior: Certiorari to the United States Court of Appeals for the District of Columbia Circuit

Holding
- The default rule is that the artist who creates a commissioned work retains copyright ownership of the work (because the artist is an independent contractor and not an employee producing a work made for hire). However, this is only a presumption which can be modified by contract.

Court membership
- Chief Justice William Rehnquist Associate Justices William J. Brennan Jr. · Byron White; Thurgood Marshall · Harry Blackmun; John P. Stevens · Sandra Day O'Connor; Antonin Scalia · Anthony Kennedy

Case opinion
- Majority: Marshall, joined by unanimous

Laws applied
- 17 U.S.C. § 201; 17 U.S.C. § 101

Community for Creative Non-Violence v. Reid, 490 U.S. 730 (1989), is a US copyright law and labor law case of a United States Supreme Court case regarding ownership of copyright.

== Facts ==
The Community for Creative Non-Violence, a homeless charity founded by J. Edward Guinan, paid sculptor James Earl Reid for a statue that depicted the plight of homeless people for a Christmas pageant in Washington DC, called "Third World America". CCNV members visited Reid's Baltimore studio as he made the statue, gave suggestions and directions about its appearance. CCNV paid Reid the final installment on delivery. They had not discussed copyright in the sculpture. They both filed competing copyright registration certificates.

The District Court held that CCNV had the copyright, as it was a ‘work made for hire’ under the Copyright Act of 1976, 17 U.S.C. § 101, owned exclusively by CCNV under § 201(b). This vests copyright ownership of works for hire in the employer or other person for whom the work is prepared, unless there is a written agreement to the contrary.

== Judgment ==
=== Court of Appeals for the District of Columbia Circuit ===
The Court of Appeals, District of Columbia Circuit, held the sculpture was not a ‘work made for hire’ because Reid was not an employee, but an independent contractor. However it remanded to the lower court to determine if the statue's copyright was co-owned under §201(a)

=== Supreme Court ===
Justice Thurgood Marshall giving the court's opinion, the Supreme Court held Reid was an independent contractor, not an employee, so the work was not "made for hire" under §101, and the copyright belonged to Reid, at least in part.

The Court determined that Reid's commission was not "specially ordered or commissioned" under paragraph 2 of 17 USC 101's "work made for hire" definition. It then considered whether Reid was an "employee" preparing the sculpture "within the scope of his employment", whose work fell within "work made for hire", or an independent contract whose work did not fall within "work made for hire".

The Court held that common law agency principles should be applied to decide whether a work is made by an employee or an independent contractor. While the statute was silent on the meaning of "employee," Congress could be inferred to have wanted to incorporate agency law definitions, as it also referred to the term "scope of employment" that agency law uses. The general common law of agency must be used over the law of any particular state, in order to create a uniform, nationwide law.

The Court listed 12 factors in determining whether someone is an independent contractor or an employee:

In determining whether a hired party is an employee under the general common law of agency, we consider the hiring party's right to control the manner and means by which the product is accomplished. Among the other factors relevant to this inquiry are [1] the skill required; [2] the source of the instrumentalities and tools; [3] the location of the work; [4] the duration of the relationship between the parties; [5] whether the hiring party has the right to assign additional projects to the hired party; [6] the extent of the hired party's discretion over when and how long to work; [7] the method of payment; [8] the hired party's role in hiring and paying assistants; [9] whether the work is part of the regular business of the hiring party; [10] whether the hiring party is in business; [11] the provision of employee benefits; and [12] the tax treatment of the hired party.

Based on these factors, the Court held Reid was an independent contractor. Reid supplied his own tools, was without any extensive supervision and was free in the way he met his deadlines. CCNV could not assign more projects to Reid, and paid him in the normal manner independent contractors are done.

The case was remanded to determine whether CCNV could still be regarded as a joint author of the sculpture and co-owner of the copyright, if the District Court determined that the parties intended their contributions be merged into a unitary whole.

== Significance ==
While the case was pending on remand, Mitch Snyder of CCNV died. The parties subsequently filed a “Joint Motion for Entry of Consent Judgment.” The consent judgment has the following terms:

- Reid was the author of Third World America and solely owned the copyrights to three-dimensional copies of the work, but Reid agreed to certain restrictions on how three-dimensional copies presented the work.
- CCNV solely owned the physical copy of the sculpture.
- CCNV and Reid were co-owners of two-dimensional copies of the work. The consent specified certain restrictions on how both parties could authorize displays of the two-dimensional copies.

Community for Creative Non-Violence v. Reid, 1991 WL 415523 (D.D.C. 1991).

In Nationwide Mut. Ins. Co. v. Darden (1992), Justice David Souter used the Court's understanding of the term employee in Reid to influence the decision, applying the Reid reading to all cases where the term employee is not otherwise defined by the statute.

== See also ==
- US labor law
- List of United States Supreme Court cases, volume 490
- List of United States Supreme Court cases
- Lists of United States Supreme Court cases by volume
- List of United States Supreme Court cases by the Rehnquist Court
