= Nationwide Mutual Insurance Co. v. Darden =

- Supreme Court of the United States

Argued January 21, 1992 Decided March 24, 1992
- Full case name: Nationwide Mutual Insurance Co., et al., Petitioners v. Robert T. Darden
- Citations: 503 U.S. 318 (more) 112 S. Ct. 1344; 117 L. Ed. 2d 581; 1992 U.S. LEXIS 1949

Case history
- Prior: Darden v. Nationwide Mut. Ins. Co., 717 F. Supp. 388 (E.D.N.C. 1989); affirmed, 922 F.2d 203 (4th Cir. 1991); cert. granted, 502 U.S. 905 (1991).

Holding
- The term "employee" as used in ERISA incorporates traditional agency law criteria for identifying master-servant relationships.

Court membership
- Chief Justice William Rehnquist Associate Justices Byron White · Harry Blackmun; John P. Stevens · Sandra Day O'Connor; Antonin Scalia · Anthony Kennedy; David Souter · Clarence Thomas

Case opinion
- Majority: Souter, joined by unanimous

Laws applied
- Employee Retirement Income Security Act of 1974, 29 U.S.C. § 1001 et seq.

Nationwide Mutual Insurance Co. v. Darden, 503 U.S. 318 (1992), is a US labor law case, concerning the scope of protection for employees, under the Employee Retirement Income Security Act of 1974 (ERISA). The Court held that principles of agency were relevant to interpreting the concept of "employee".

== Background ==
Robert Darden sold Nationwide Mutual Insurance Company policies from 1962 to 1980 in Fayetteville, North Carolina. His agency contract stated he would be enrolled in the company retirement plan. The contract said, if his job terminated, he would forfeit entitlements if he worked and competed with Nationwide within 25 miles of his business location. In November 1980, Nationwide terminated its contractual relationship. A month later, Darden started selling insurance policies for Nationwide’s competitors. Nationwide said he was disqualified from receiving retirement benefits. Darden sued under the Employee Retirement Income Security Act of 1974 (ERISA), 29 USC §1132(a). He contended he was protected as an ‘employee’ under §3(6), 29 USC §1002(6), and that under 29 USC §1053(a) his benefits had ‘vested’ and could not be forfeited. Nationwide argued Darden was not an employee, but an independent contractor.

=== Procedural history ===
At trial, the federal district Court held Darden was an independent contractor, not an employee, under common law agency principles. Darden appealed.

The Court of Appeals for the Fourth Circuit found Darden was an employee, and that ERISA’s policy had gone beyond common law agency principles. It asserted that "Darden most probably would not qualify as an employee" under traditional agency law principles. But Darden would be an employee, under the ERISA policy, if he could show (1) he had a reasonable expectation that he would receive benefits, (2) he relied on this expectation, and (3) he lacked the economic bargaining power to contract out of benefit plan forfeiture provisions.

== Opinion of the Court ==
The Court held that ERISA did incorporate traditional agency law. Where nothing is definite, the Court would presume Congress meant an agency law relationship unless clearly stating otherwise, as in Community for Creative Non-Violence v. Reid, 490 U.S. 730, 739-740 (1989) The first two prongs of the substitute test of the Court of Appeals, insofar as it produced new standards of expectations and reliance, were ill founded. All of the incidents of the employment relationship must be assessed and weighed with no one factor being decisive. In an opinion for the majority of the Court, Justice Souter stated

II

We have often been asked to construe the meaning of "employee" where the statute containing the term does not helpfully define it. Most recently we confronted this problem in Community for Creative Non-Violence v. Reid, 490 U.S. 730, 109 S.Ct. 2166, 104 L.Ed.2d 811 (1989), a case in which a sculptor and a nonprofit group each claimed copyright ownership in a statue the group had commissioned from the artist. The dispute ultimately turned on whether, by the terms of § 101 of the Copyright Act of 1976, 17 U.S.C. § 101, the statue had been "prepared by an employee within the scope of his or her employment." Because the Copyright Act nowhere defined the term "employee," we unanimously applied the "well established" principle that

"[w]here Congress uses terms that have accumulated settled meaning under . . . the common law, a court must infer, unless the statute otherwise dictates, that Congress means to incorporate the established meaning of these terms. . . . In the past, when Congress has used the term 'employee' without defining it, we have concluded that Congress intended to describe the conventional master-servant relationship as understood by common-law agency doctrine. See, e.g., Kelley v. Southern Pacific Co., 419 U.S. 318, 322-323 (1974); Baker v. Texas & Pacific R. Co., 359 U.S. 227, 228 (1959) (per curiam); Robinson v. Baltimore & Ohio R. Co., 237 U.S. 84, 94 (1915)." 490 U.S., at 739-740, 109 S.Ct., at 2172 (internal quotations omitted).

While we supported this reading of the Copyright Act with other observations, the general rule stood as independent authority for the decision.

So too should it stand here. ERISA's nominal definition of "employee" as "any individual employed by an employer," 29 U.S.C. § 1002(6), is completely circular and explains nothing. As for the rest of the Act, Darden does not cite, and we do not find, any provision either giving specific guidance on the term's meaning or suggesting that construing it to incorporate traditional agency law principles would thwart the congressional design or lead to absurd results. Thus, we adopt a common-law test for determining who qualifies as an "employee" under ERISA,3 a test we most recently summarized in Reid:

"In determining whether a hired party is an employee under the general common law of agency, we consider the hiring party's right to control the manner and means by which the product is accomplished. Among the other factors relevant to this inquiry are the skill required; the source of the instrumentalities and tools; the location of the work; the duration of the relationship between the parties; whether the hiring party has the right to assign additional projects to the hired party; the extent of the hired party's discretion over when and how long to work; the method of payment; the hired party's role in hiring and paying assistants; whether the work is part of the regular business of the hiring party; whether the hiring party is in business; the provision of employee benefits; and the tax treatment of the hired party." 490 U.S., at 751-752, 109 S.Ct., at 2178-2179 (footnotes omitted).

Cf. Restatement (Second) of Agency § 220(2) (1958) (listing nonexhaustive criteria for identifying master-servant relationship); Rev.Rul. 87-41, 1987-1 Cum.Bull. 296, 298-299 (setting forth twenty factors as guides in determining whether an individual qualifies as a common-law "employee" in various tax law contexts). Since the common-law test contains "no shorthand formula or magic phrase that can be applied to find the answer, . . . all of the incidents of the relationship must be assessed and weighed with no one factor being decisive." NLRB v. United Ins. Co. of America, 390 U.S., at 258, 88 S.Ct., at 991.

In taking its different tack, the Court of Appeals cited NLRB v. Hearst Publications, Inc., 322 U.S., at 120-129, 64 S.Ct., at 855-856, and United States v. Silk, 331 U.S., at 713, 67 S.Ct., at 1468, for the proposition that "the content of the term 'employee' in the context of a particular federal statute is 'to be construed "in the light of the mischief to be corrected and the end to be attained." .... But Hearst and Silk, which interpreted "employee" for purposes of the National Labor Relations Act and Social Security Act, respectively, are feeble precedents for unmooring the term from the common law. In each case, the Court read "employee," which neither statute helpfully defined, to imply something broader than the common-law definition; after each opinion, Congress amended the statute so construed to demonstrate that the usual common-law principles were the keys to meaning. See United Ins. Co., 390 U.S., at 256, 88 S.Ct., at 989 ("Congressional reaction to [Hearst ] was adverse and Congress passed an amendment. . . . [t]he obvious purpose of [which] was to have the . . . courts apply general agency principles in distinguishing between employees and independent contractors under the Act"); Social Security Act of 1948, ch. 468, § 2(a), 62 Stat. 438 (1948) (amending statute to provide that term "employee" "does not include . . . any individual who, under the usual common-law rules applicable in determining the employer-employee relationship, has the status of an independent contractor") (emphasis added); see also United States v. W.M. Webb, Inc., 397 U.S. 179, 183-188 (1970) (discussing congressional reaction to Silk).

To be sure, Congress did not, strictly speaking, "overrule" our interpretation of those statutes, since the Constitution invests the Judiciary, not the Legislature, with the final power to construe the law. But a principle of statutory construction can endure just so many legislative revisitations, and Reid's presumption that Congress means an agency law definition for "employee" unless it clearly indicates otherwise signaled our abandonment of Silk's emphasis on construing that term " 'in the light of the mischief to be corrected and the end to be attained.' " Silk, supra, 331 U.S., at 713, 67 S.Ct., at 1468, quoting Hearst, supra, 322 U.S., at 124, 64 S.Ct., at 857.

At oral argument, Darden tried to subordinate Reid to Rutherford Food Corp. v. McComb, 331 U.S. 722, 67 S.Ct. 1473, 91 L.Ed. 1772 (1947), which adopted a broad reading of "employee" under the Fair Labor Standards Act (FLSA). And amicus United States, while rejecting Darden's position, also relied on Rutherford Food for the proposition that, when enacting ERISA, Congress must have intended a modified common-law definition of "employee" that would advance, in a way not defined, the Act's "remedial purposes." Brief for United States as Amicus Curiae 15-21.5 But Rutherford Food supports neither position. The definition of "employee" in the FLSA evidently derives from the child labor statutes, see Rutherford Food, supra, at 728, 67 S.Ct., at 1475, and, on its face, goes beyond its ERISA counterpart. While the FLSA, like ERISA, defines an "employee" to include "any individual employed by an employer," it defines the verb "employ" expansively to mean "suffer or permit to work." 52 Stat. 1060, § 3, codified at 29 U.S.C. §§ 203(e), (g). This latter definition, whose striking breadth we have previously noted, Rutherford Food, supra, at 728, 67 S.Ct., at 1475, stretches the meaning of "employee" to cover some parties who might not qualify as such under a strict application of traditional agency law principles. ERISA lacks any such provision, however, and the textual asymmetry between the two statutes precludes reliance on FLSA cases when construing ERISA's concept of "employee."

Quite apart from its inconsistency with our precedents, the Fourth Circuit's analysis reveals an approach infected with circularity and unable to furnish predictable results. Applying the first element of its test, which ostensibly enquires into an employee's "expectations," the Court of Appeals concluded that Nationwide had "created a reasonable expectation on the 'employees' ' part that benefits would be paid to them in the future," Darden I, 796 F.2d, at 706, by establishing "a comprehensive retirement benefits program for its insurance agents," id., at 707. The court thought it was simply irrelevant that the forfeiture clause in Darden's contract "limited" his expectation of receiving pension benefits, since "it is precisely that sort of employer-imposed condition on the employee's anticipations that Congress intended to outlaw with the enactment of ERISA." Id., at 707, n. 7 (emphasis added). Thus, the Fourth Circuit's test would turn not on a claimant's actual "expectations," which the court effectively deemed inconsequential, ibid., but on his statutory entitlement to relief, which itself depends on his very status as an "employee." This begs the question.

This circularity infects the test's second prong as well, which considers the extent to which a claimant has relied on his "expectation" of benefits by "remaining for 'long years,' or a substantial period of time, in the 'employer's' service, and by foregoing other significant means of providing for [his] retirement." Id., at 706. While this enquiry is ostensibly factual, we have seen already that one of its objects may not be: to the extent that actual "expectations" are (as in Darden's case) unnecessary to relief, the nature of a claimant's required "reliance" is left unclear. Moreover, any enquiry into "reliance," whatever it might entail, could apparently lead to different results for claimants holding identical jobs and enrolled in identical plans. Because, for example, Darden failed to make much independent provision for his retirement, he satisfied the "reliance" prong of the Fourth Circuit's test, see Darden II, 922 F.2d, at 206, whereas a more provident colleague who signed exactly the same contracts, but saved for a rainy day, might not.

Any such approach would severely compromise the capacity of companies like Nationwide to figure out who their "employees" are and what, by extension, their pension-fund obligations will be. To be sure, the traditional agency law criteria offer no paradigm of determinacy. But their application generally turns on factual variables within an employer's knowledge, thus permitting categorical judgments about the "employee" status of claimants with similar job descriptions. Agency law principles comport, moreover, with our recent precedents and with the common understanding, reflected in those precedents, of the difference between an employee and an independent contractor.

III

While the Court of Appeals noted that "Darden most probably would not qualify as an employee" under traditional agency law principles, Darden I, supra, at 705, it did not actually decide that issue. We therefore reverse and remand the case to that court for proceedings consistent with this opinion.

The Court remanded the case to the District Court for reconsideration.

== Significance ==
The result of the case was to affirm that principles of agency, alongside "economic reality" or remedying inequality of bargaining according to the purpose of a statute, must be taken into account when determining who is an employee. Common law tests are not to be disregarded.

== See also ==
- US labor law
