= Stefania Dovhan =

Ukrainian-American soprano

- Born: Stefania Dovhan; Kyiv, Ukraine
- Genres: Opera
- Occupation: Opera singer (soprano)
- Instrument: Vocals
- Website: www.stefaniadovhan.com

Stefania Dovhan is a Ukrainian-American soprano.

== Early life and education ==
Born in Kyiv, Ukraine, she studied in the US and in Germany. She studied voice at the Baltimore School for the Arts and the University of Maryland College Park. Dovhan was a member of the International Opera Studio in Nuremberg, Germany during the 2004–2005 season where she debuted as Musetta in La Boheme.

== Career ==
Her engagements have included the title role in Charpentier's Louise (Spoleto Festival), Donna Anna and Adina (New York City Opera), Musetta at the Royal Opera House Covent Garden, Marguerite (Lyric Opera Baltimore), Donna Anna (Portland Opera), Vreli in A Village Romeo and Juliet, Violetta and Gilda (Karlsruhe State Theatre), Cleopatra in Giulio Cesare, Liù, Fiordiligi, Titania in The Fairy Queen and Stella in A Streetcar Named Desire (Theater Hagen) and Pamina (Mainz and Saarbrücken State Theatres). She was a finalist in Operalia (2010) and in the Hans Gabor Belvedere Competition, and won the Emmerich Smola Prize.
