= Statue of Billie Holiday =

Statue in Baltimore, Maryland, U.S.

- Artist: James Earl Reid
- Year: 1985
- Completion date: 2009
- Medium: Bronze
- Subject: Billie Holiday
- Location: Baltimore, Maryland, U.S.; 39°18′04.3″N 76°37′55.3″W

A statue of Billie Holiday is installed at Billie Holiday Plaza on Pennsylvania Avenue in the neighborhood of Upton in Baltimore, Maryland, United States.

== History and design ==
Plans for a memorial to Holiday in Baltimore began in 1971; a drug treatment centre and statue were envisioned, but only the statue was eventually built. The statue was part of the planned urban renewal of the surrounding area of Upton. The Royal Theatre, where Holiday performed, originally stood diagonally opposite the statue. Holiday was raised in Baltimore.

The sculptor James Earl Reid was commissioned to design the monument to Holiday in 1977. Disputes over the rising costs of the work led to Reid eventually distancing himself from the piece. Reid had also intended that the statue be placed on a 6-foot (1.8 m) pedestal. It was finally unveiled in 1985, without Reid in attendance at the ceremony. The sculpture cost $113,000 (equivalent to $338,266 in 2025). The statue of Holiday is 8 ft 6 in (2.59 m) in height. Holiday is depicted in a strapless evening gown wearing her signature gardenias in her braided hair. The sculpture was completed in 2009 with the addition of bronze relief panels depicting events in the African-American struggle for civil rights. These panels had been rejected as too controversial at the time of the statue's unveiling in 1985, and their creation had been approved with additional funding of $76,000 in 2007. The statue was rededicated in 2009 with a base of granite. At its 2009 unveiling Reid said that "[Holiday] gave such a rich credibility to the experiences of black people and the black artist".

One of the panels depicts a child with its umbilical cord attached, in reference to the lyrics of Holiday's song "God Bless the Child". A second panel depicts the lynching of an African-American man in reference to the 'strange fruit hanging from strange trees' in the lyrics of Holiday's signature song "Strange Fruit". In reference to the Jim Crow laws, a crow is depicted eating a gardenia. It is situated behind Holiday, and above Reid's signature.
