= Rachael McLaren =

Canadian dancer

- Born: 1985 or 1986 (age 40–41); Manitoba, Canada
- Occupations: dancer, tennis drawer
- Dancing career
- Former groups: Alvin Ailey American Dance Theater

Rachael McLaren is a Canadian dancer who performed with the Alvin Ailey American Dance Theater.

== Early life ==
McLaren was raised in Winnipeg, Manitoba, and was the youngest of four children. She started ballet at age five, at the Royal Winnipeg Ballet School's recreational program, where she was one of the only black students, and was rejected by the professional program, as she was "not a fit".

== Career ==
At age 17, she was cast as an ensemble member and an understudy of Ali in the Toronto production of Mamma Mia!, despite having little vocal training. Two years later, in 2006, she joined Ailey II in New York City, and entered the main company, Alvin Ailey American Dance Theater, in 2008. She dances both contemporary ballet and modern dance in the company. In 2016, on the occasion of Chroma's 10th anniversary, she and four of her colleagues performed the piece with dancers from The Royal Ballet at the Royal Opera House, London.

As of June 2019, she is no longer on the Ailey company's roster.

== Personal life ==
In November 2020, McLaren did a video interview with the Canadian Broadcasting Corporation. She discussed moving back to Winnipeg to marry her high-school sweetheart, with whom she had been in a long-distance relationship. As of the time of that interview, McLaren and her husband had one daughter and were expecting another child. As of December 2022, McLaren has two young daughters, and works as a Guest Choreographer with Shelley Shearer School of Dance in Winnipeg. McLaren also teaches dance, fitness, mindfulness meditation, and does acting and stunt performing in television and film productions.
