= Jacqueline Green =

American dancer (born 1989)

- Born: December 26, 1989 (age 36); Baltimore
- Education: Baltimore School for the Arts 2007 Fordham University 2011
- Occupation: Ballet dancer
- Employer: Alvin Ailey American Dance Theater
- Awards: Princess Grace Dance Fellowship Award 2014

Jacqueline Green (born 26 December 1989) is an American ballet dancer who formerly danced with the Alvin Ailey American Dance Theater in New York. She is noted for her elegant and commanding presence on stage as well as her unusually rapid ascent in being recognized as a great and powerful dancer.

== Early life and education ==
Green is originally from Baltimore and began her dance training at age 13 at the Baltimore School for the Arts. The audition she completed to gain entrance to the school marked both her first audition and ballet class. During Green's second year of dance, she met respected Ailey alumni dancer Linda-Denise Fisher-Harrell who was then actively dancing with the company. Green credits this meeting as pivotal and inspiring, as Fisher-Harrell was another woman of color from Baltimore. Fisher-Harrell encouraged Green and further introduced her to the world of professional dance. Green graduated from the Baltimore School for the Arts in 2007. She continued her studies and went on to attend the Ailey/Fordham University BFA program with Denise Jefferson, graduating in 2011. Green states that, during summer ballet programs she attended, she was often the only or one of very few Black students and found dealing with white staff and students' expectations of Black bodies challenging.

== Career ==
Green impressed the Ailey American Dance Theater's incoming artistic director, Robert Battle, when she performed with Ailey II in Shards by the esteemed Seattle choreographer Donald Byrd. She auditioned for and was invited to join the Alvin Ailey American Dance Theater in 2011.

Green received a dance fellowship award from the Princess Grace Foundation in 2014. She has been granted prominent roles in many productions at Ailey including one in Pas de Duke and the key "umbrella" role in Revelations, both by artistic director Judith Jamison. She also worked with Jamison in 2018 on Cry.

In 2019, Green was recognized for her strong stage presence when performing in Donald Byrd's "Greenwood", a dance production centered around the 1921 Tulsa race massacre.

Green performed in Ode, a work by the Miami-born choreographer Jamar Roberts that premiered in 2019 and whose subject matter was gun violence and its effects. The Observer praised both Roberts and Green for Ode, stating that the work was "strengthened by the presence of Jacqueline Green in the central role—tall, strong, commanding yet modest, she has emerged as the company's star. You can't keep your eyes off her, and you find yourself speculating on how she can expand her range." A reviewer at the Financial Times also lauded Roberts' Ode and described Green as "bewitching".

Green credits her success to the late Alvin Ailey, founder of the Ailey Dance Theater.

== Personal life ==
It was reported in 2019 that Preston Miller is Green's fiancé.
