= Baltimore School for the Arts =

Performing and visual arts school in Baltimore, Maryland

Coordinates: 39°17′54″N 76°37′03″W

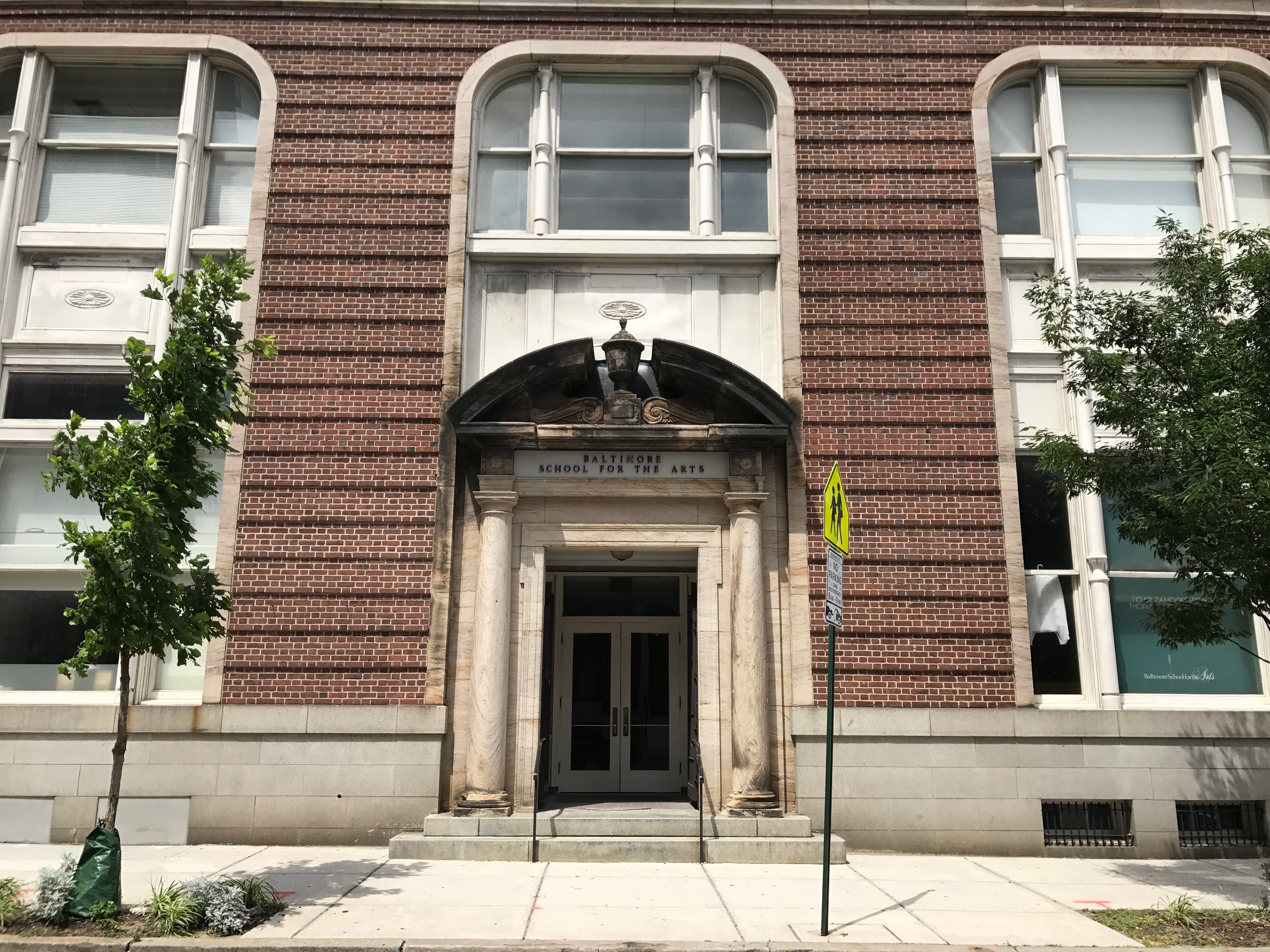

Location
- 712 Cathedral Street; Baltimore, Maryland 21201; United States

Information
- School type: Public, Magnet, Art, High school, Secondary school
- Motto: "Where the Arts Change Kids' Lives"
- Founded: 1979
- School district: Baltimore City Public Schools
- Superintendent: Sonja Brookins Santelises
- School number: 415
- Director: Rosiland Cauthen
- Grades: 9–12
- Enrollment: 440 (2018)
- Area: Urban
- Website: www.bsfa.org
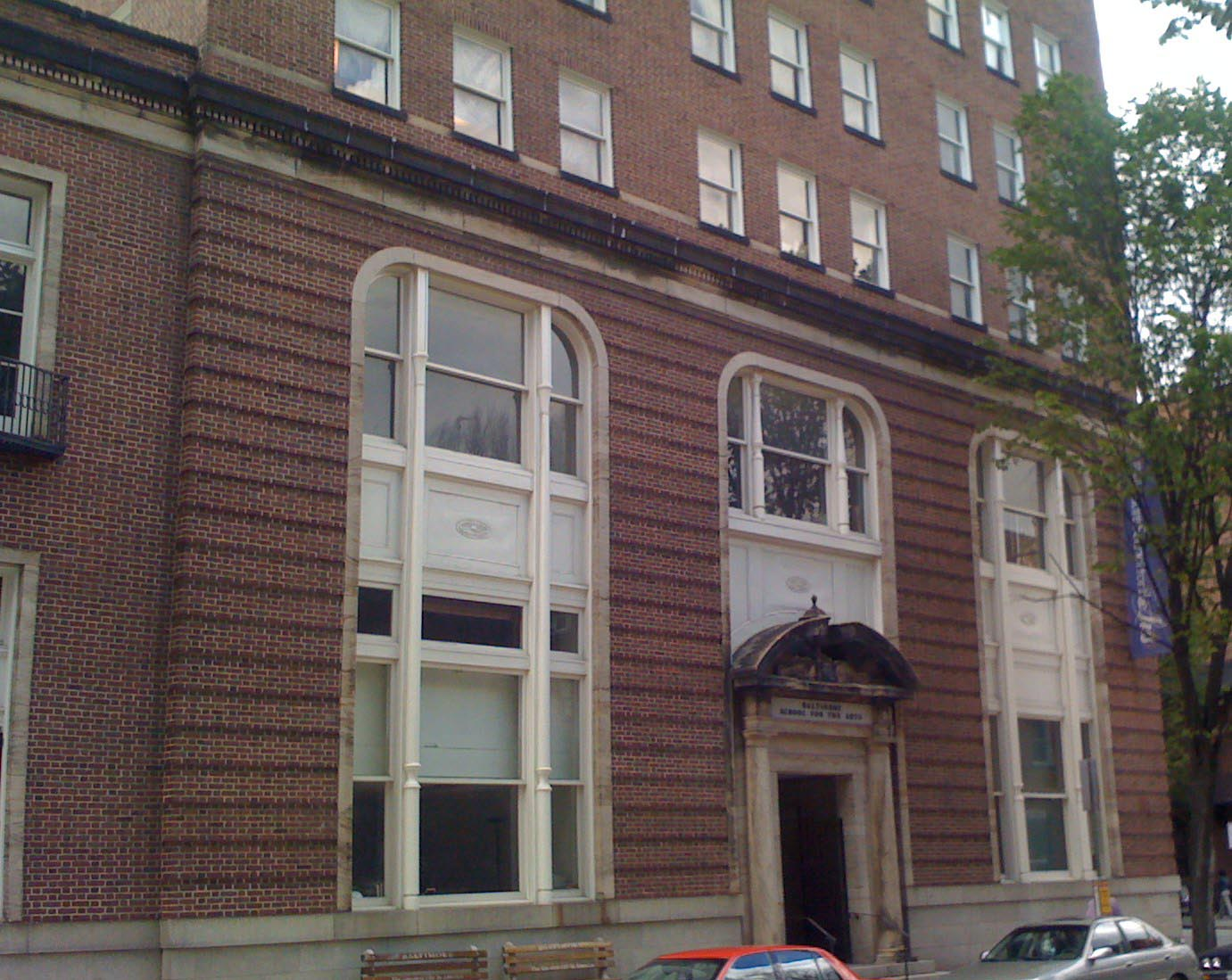

The Baltimore School for the Arts (BSA) is a public high school specializing in training in the performing and visual arts in Mount Vernon, Baltimore, Maryland, United States. It is part of the Baltimore City Public Schools system. Established in 1979, The Baltimore School for the Arts offers art concentrations in vocal music, instrumental music, acting, theater production, dance, visual arts and film. The high school has produced numerous "Presidential Scholars" in the Arts, and its students have attended major conservatories and Ivy League Schools.

In 2020, BSA was named a Silver Medal School by the U.S. News & World Report magazine and was ranked 1,173rd nationally and 29th in Maryland (first overall in Baltimore City).

== Charter creating the Baltimore School for the Arts ==
This charter followed many years of effort to create an arts high school, including a 1978 recommendation of a special Task Force appointed and given strong support by then Mayor William Donald Schaefer. The BSA was created as part of the Baltimore City Public Schools system; however, the charter provided the BSA with the structure and the authority to design and implement policies and programs.

The school was initially founded with instructional programs in vocal music, instrumental music, acting, theater production, dance, and visual arts; however, in December of 2016, Mark Joseph donated three million dollars to the school to support a new film and visual storytelling program. The donation was the largest in the school's history. The program was first launched in the fall of 2017.

== Mission ==
The Baltimore School for the Arts is a school that intends to prepare its students for careers in the arts. The school provides qualified students with training in one of five arts disciplines: music (vocal/instrumental), visual arts, theatre (acting/stage design and production), dance, or film in combination with a college preparatory academic program. The theater and music majors are split into two groups each: For the theater department, there are majors both in acting and in stage design and production, and the music department is divided into vocal and instrumental performance majors.

== Arts ==
The Baltimore School for the Arts is a four-year public high school that provides young people with pre-professional training in the arts. Students pursue any one of five disciplines—the visual arts, music (vocal or instrumental), theater (acting or theater production), dance and film. In addition, the school maintains artistic relationships with local organizations such as the Baltimore Symphony Orchestra, Center Stage, the Hippodrome Foundation, and the Walters Museum.

== Academics ==
Students follow a college-preparatory curriculum that emphasizes the core values commonly found in a liberal arts education. BSA has a graduation rate of 95 percent and sends 99% of its students into higher education. The academic program includes honors-level English, Spanish, Physics, Chemistry, Biology, World History, and U.S. History courses. AP classes in American Government, English Language, English Literature, Calculus AB, and Spanish Language & Culture are also offered. In 2022, 131 BSA students took 194 AP exams in English Language and Composition, English Literature and Composition, and Calculus. Students spend half of each day, four or five periods, in academic courses and half of each day, four or five periods, in their art discipline.

== Extracurricular activities ==
Due to many students' focus on their artistic discipline, the school only began hosting extracurriculars in the 2000s and still retains a limited selection. The BSA has no sports. The BSA's official in-school newspaper is The Muse, which runs bi-monthly and is independent from the school.

== Admission ==
About 400 students from public and private schools in and around Baltimore attend the school. Students are accepted by an audition or portfolio review only– without regard to grades or academic performance. The audition process varies by artistic discipline. Rising 9th and 10th graders may apply to attend. Of the 1,000 or so students who audition each year, about 115 are accepted for enrollment.

== Campus and facilities ==
Situated in Mount Vernon, a historic cultural district immediately north of downtown Baltimore, BSA is located in two buildings on the corner of Madison and Cathedral Streets. It occupies the former Alcazar Hotel and a historic brownstone. Workspaces consist of music practice rooms, art and dance studios, a film editing lab, a costume/scene shop, and a Center for Collaborative Arts and Technology (CCAT) in the third floor library. Performance spaces include a black box theater, a recital hall, an art gallery and a theater for larger performances and galas.

== In media ==
- The school in the 2006 film Step Up was a fictionalized version of BSA, called The Maryland School for the Arts. Significant differences exist between the institution portrayed in the film and the real school; some parts of the movie were filmed in the school.
- The Maryland School for the Arts also provided the setting for the 2008 film sequel to Step Up, Step Up 2 the Streets, although most of the actual filming of the movie did not take place inside BSA.

== Notable alumni ==
- Tupac Shakur, rapper, songwriter, and actor
- Jada Pinkett Smith, actress
- Mia Brownell, artist
- Christian Siriano, fashion designer and Project Runway winner
- Tracie Thoms, actress
- Makeba Riddick, songwriter
- Josh Charles, actor
- Antonio Hart, jazz saxophonist
- Katherine Needleman, classical oboist
- Larry Gilliard Jr., actor
- Stefania Dovhan, soprano
- Sara VanDerBeek, photographer
- Shalita Grant, actress
- Noelle Beck, actress
- William Rhodes, sculptor and mixed-media artist
- Shinique Smith, painter, sculptor, installation and video artist.
- Jacqueline Green, ballet dancer
- Bresha Webb, actress
- Moses Ingram, actress
- Rachel Hilson, actress
