= The Tales of Beatrix Potter (ballet) =

1992 ballet adapted by Anthony Dowell

The Tales of Beatrix Potter is a 1992 ballet adapted for stage by Anthony Dowell from the 1971 film The Tales of Beatrix Potter that was choreographed by Frederick Ashton that in turn was based on the children's books by Beatrix Potter.

== Adaptation for the stage ==
It is reported that Ashton himself did not want his original 1971 film to be transferred to the stage. However, in 1992 Anthony Dowell did create an adaptation of the film. Dowell worked with the original film designer Christine Edzard and mask-maker Rostislav Doboujinsky. The Tales of Beatrix Potter premièred on stage at the Royal Opera House, Covent Garden on 4 December 1992 in a double bill with Ashton's ballet The Dream.

== Score ==
The composer was John Lanchbery, he put together a score from tunes by Minkus, Balfe, Offenbach, Sullivan and others. Lanchbery not only composed the score but also conducted the orchestra for the 1992 production. Ashton's original film score had been stored on transparencies which had suffered from damp and rodent damage, so they had to be painstakingly pieced together for the stage adaptation.

== Costumes ==
One of the challenges faced by the dancers in the stage production is that the costumes mean that many of the dancers have severely restricted view. The masks created from the original 1971 film moulds are made from polystyrene with holes drilled for breathing and vision are covered in gauze and flocking or hand sewn hair. Doboujinsky built some of the costumes on everyday items such as cycle helmets.

== Reception ==
=== 1992 production ===
The critics did not review the original 1992 production favourably, considering it to be too long, lacking plot and missing Ashton's inspirational touch. Mary Clarke of The Guardian described the ballet as "nauseating" and finishing her review with the opinion that "Sir Fred would have been appalled."

=== Subsequent productions ===
Susan Frater of the Evening Standard praised the Royal Ballet's 2007 revival as "charming" with wonderful sets and costumes. But also criticised it as overly long and for children.

Clement Crisp reviewed the 2010 performance for the Financial Times, he considered Potter's characters "nauseating" the score "Victorian vulgar" and the costumes bloated. But he did acknowledge that the audience liked it.

== 1992 cast ==
- Mrs Tiggy-Winkle: Iain Webb
- Fox: Christopher Saunders
- Jemima Puddleduck: Sarah Walton
- Pigling Bland: Peter Abegglen
- Berkshire Black Pig: Belinda Hatley
- Two bad mice (Tom Thumb and Hunca Munca): Jonathan Howells and Nicola Roberts
- Johnny Townmouse: Anthony Bourne
- Jeremy Fisher: William Trevitt
- Squirrel Nutkin: Matthew Hart
