= Federal probation and supervised release in the United States =

Concept from US criminal law

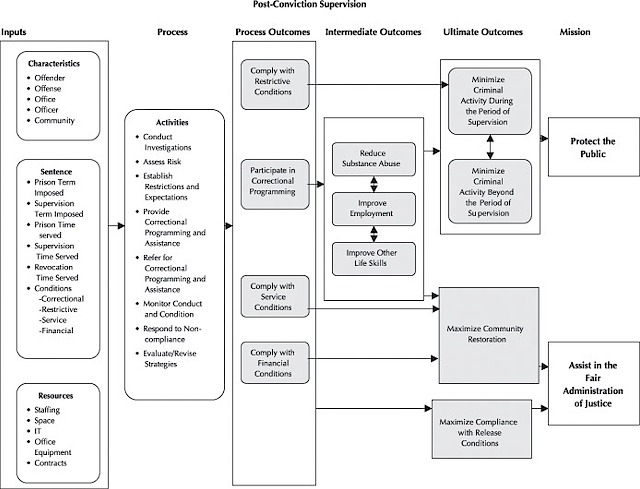
The life cycle of federal supervision for a defendant.

United States federal probation and supervised release are imposed at sentencing. The difference between probation and supervised release is that the former is imposed as a substitute for imprisonment, or in addition to home detention, while the latter is imposed in addition to imprisonment. Probation and supervised release are both administered by the U.S. Probation and Pretrial Services System. Federal probation has existed since 1909, while supervised release has only existed since 1987, when it replaced federal parole as a means for imposing supervision following release from prison.

More than 8 in 10 offenders sentenced to federal prison also undergo court-ordered supervised release. In 2015, approximately 115,000 offenders were serving supervised release, with these offenders spending an average of four years under supervision.

Some conditions of probation and supervised release, such as compliance with drug tests, are made mandatory by statute, while others are optional. Some terms are recommended by the United States Sentencing Guidelines for specific situations; for instance, a requirement of participation in a mental health program is recommended when "the court has reason to believe that the defendant is in need of psychological or psychiatric treatment." The judge has broad discretion in deciding what optional conditions to impose, as long as those conditions are reasonably related to the nature and circumstances of the offense and the history and characteristics of the defendant, the need for the sentence imposed to afford adequate deterrence to criminal conduct, the need to protect the public from further crimes of the defendant, the need to provide the defendant with needed educational or vocational training, medical care, or other correctional treatment in the most effective manner; and involve no greater deprivation of liberty than is reasonably necessary for these purposes and are consistent with any pertinent policy statements issued by the United States Sentencing Commission. The possible length of supervision is specified by law, with recommendations for particular situations being provided by the sentencing guidelines. The length and conditions of supervision can be modified by the court after sentencing, although the defendant has a right to a hearing if changes are being proposed that would adversely affect them.

Violations of conditions of probation or supervised release can result in said revocations being reported to the court and a revocation hearing being held. In such hearings, the defendant has the right to be informed of the alleged violation, to retain counsel or to request that counsel be appointed, and to have a probable cause hearing. The defendant has the burden of establishing that if released pending further proceedings, they will not flee or pose a danger to any other person or the community. The law mandates revocation for some violations, such as possession of a controlled substance, possession of a firearm, or refusal to take a drug test. The statute specifies the possible consequences of revocation, and the sentencing guidelines establish grades of violations and a revocation table recommending various terms of imprisonment depending on the seriousness of the violation and the defendant's criminal history when they were originally sentenced.

== Classes of offenses ==
The class of offense determines what term of probation or supervised release may be imposed at sentencing, and the maximum term of imprisonment that may be imposed if supervised release is revoked. In the case of supervised release, if said maximum prison sentence for revocations has not yet been imposed, the defendant can be sentenced to a new term of supervised release to be served after the imprisonment. The PROTECT Act significantly changed the law concerning this.

Offense classes
Type	Class	Maximum prison term	Maximum fine (Note: The maximum fine for misdemeanors is increased to $250,000 if the offense resulted in death; the maximum fine is doubled if the offender is an organization, as opposed to an individual.)	Probation term (Note: Probation is imposed as a substitute for imprisonment.)	Maximum supervised release term (Note: Supervised release is imposed in addition to imprisonment.)	Maximum prison term upon supervised release revocation	Special assessment (Note: The special assessment is quadrupled in value for felonies and quintupled in value for misdemeanors if the offender is a person other than an individual.)
Felony	A	Life imprisonment (or death in certain cases of murder, treason, espionage or mass trafficking of drugs)	$250,000	1-5 years	5 years	5 years	$100
Felony	B	25 years or more	$250,000	1-5 years	5 years	3 years	$100
Felony	C	More than 10 years and less than 25 years	$250,000	1-5 years	3 years	2 years	$100
Felony	D	More than 5 years and less than 10 years	$250,000	1-5 years	3 years	2 years	$100
Felony	E	More than 1 year and less than 5 years	$250,000	1-5 years	1 year	1 year	$100
Misdemeanor	A	More than 6 months and less than 1 year	$100,000	0-5 years	1 year	1 year	$25
Misdemeanor	B	More than 30 days and less than 6 months	$5,000	0-5 years	1 year	1 year	$10
Misdemeanor	C	More than 5 days and less than 30 days	$5,000	0-5 years	1 year	1 year	$5
Infraction	N/A	5 days or less	$5,000	0-1 years	N/A	N/A	N/A

== Probation ==
Probation as a substitute for imprisonment is authorized by the United States Code unless the offense is a Class A or Class B felony and the defendant is an individual; unless the offense is an offense for which probation has been expressly precluded; and unless the defendant is sentenced at the same time to a term of imprisonment for the same or a different offense that is not a petty crime. The exception is that a defendant convicted of a Class A or B felony can be granted probation if they render substantial assistance to authorities. For first-time domestic violence offenders, probation is mandatory if the convicted defendant is not sentenced to a term of imprisonment. The U.S. Sentencing Commission is authorized to further restriction probation. Probation is authorized by the sentencing guidelines if the applicable guideline range is in Zone A of the Sentencing Table; or if the applicable guideline range is in Zone B of the Sentencing Table and the court imposes a condition or combination of conditions requiring intermittent confinement, community confinement, or home detention as provided in subsection (c)(3) of §5C1.1 (Imposition of a Term of Imprisonment). In 1986, the law was made somewhat harsher when Congress eliminated that provision that "The liability of a defendant for any unexecuted fine or other punishment imposed as to which probation is granted shall be fully discharged by the fulfillment of the terms and conditions of probation." Under the earlier probation statute (repealed 1987), a defendant convicted of violating a statute which provided for a mandatory minimum sentence could still be placed on probation, with their sentence suspended, or could be made eligible for immediate parole. Since United States v. Booker, the sentencing guidelines have become advisory but courts are nonetheless unable to impose probation in lieu of a mandatory minimum imposed by statute.

The grant of probation may be made on the court's own motion. Because the power of pardoning offenders is vested in the President of the United States only, probation is not considered a pardon of any kind, but rather an authorized form of punishment of mild nature, and unlike a pardon, it cannot be refused by the convicted person. Federal courts have an inherent power to reduce a sentence, but without Congressional authorization, a federal court has no power to suspend the execution of a sentence which it has imposed or to place the defendant on probation. When this was first announced by the Supreme Court in 1916 in the case of Ex Parte United States, an abrupt halt was brought to a practice which, by then, had become widespread in the federal system, and which had existed for more than 70 years. A sentence for a period of one year with an order that, after the defendant had served three months of his sentence, probation was to be granted on the condition that the defendant abide by laws, was void for want of jurisdiction, since it was in effect an exercise of pardoning power.

Probation is an act of grace and the defendant does not gain a vested right in probationary status once a probationary sentence is imposed. It has been ruled that the probation power does not unconstitutionally encroach on the pardon power of the President. Since probation is a form of punishment, once the sentence of probation has commenced, the court will run afoul of the double jeopardy clause if it increases the penalty. Probation's primary objective is to protect society by rehabilitating the offender. A person placed on probation is considered a probationer of the court as a whole, and not that of a particular judge thereof. When a defendant is placed on probation, he expressly agrees to be subject to supervision appropriate to a probationer, to avoid the more onerous regimen of a prisoner; accordingly, the defendant retains those rights of an ordinary citizen that are compatible with probationary status, although certain rights, such as the right against self-incrimination, are impaired. There is no requirement that probation must be granted on a specified showing. Probation is considered a privilege and not a right. The action of a district court in refusing to grant probation is not reviewable on appeal except possibly for arbitrary or capricious action on the part of the District Court amounting to abuse of discretion. The type of person for whom the benefit of probation was intended is a young first offender. A trial court cannot deny probation to a defendant on the sole ground that it has a standing policy of denying probation to those who stand trial instead of pleading guilty.

Probationary sentences that fall outside the U.S. Sentencing Guidelines can be appealed. An application for probation cannot be acted upon by the trial court after the defendant is taken into custody by the federal marshal to await transportation to the place at which sentence is to be served, since by that point the sentence has already begun to run. The District Court is without jurisdiction to modify its judgment during the pendency of an appeal, but it retains the power to modify, suspend, or otherwise deal with terms of probation. The court also cannot, by issuing a reservation in its judgment, confer upon itself the power to grant probation after the sentence has begun. However, the defendant's paying of a fine does not constitute partial execution of sentence such that it would defeat the court's power to grant probation. A sentence of probation is considered a final judgment, but it can nonetheless be modified or revoked, corrected, or appealed and modified, pursuant to the applicable law and federal rules of criminal procedure.

A defendant can, however, be sentenced to prison on some indictments and be placed on probation for other indictments.

== Supervised release ==
Supervised release made its debut in 1984 with the enactment of the Federal Sentencing Guidelines. It replaced federal parole for all crimes committed after November 1, 1987. Congress had concluded that the parole system operated in an arbitrary way because the period of a defendant's street supervision was based on the time remaining in the defendant's original sentence. The system of supervised release was originally intended to help with the rehabilitation and reintegration of offenders into the community, and did not allow revocation of supervised release. The philosophy was that minor violations should not result in revocation, and that new crimes should be dealt with through prosecution as a new offense. However, the system was greatly revamped by the Anti-Drug Abuse Acts of 1986 and 1988. These laws added an incapacitative "protection of the public" goal as a purpose to be served by supervised release, allowed revocation of supervised release, and made revocation mandatory for defendants who committed controlled substance violations.

=== Violations ===
Violation of the conditions can result in revocation of probation or supervised release. Upon revocation of probation, the court may, after considering the factors set forth in 18 U.S.C. § 3553(a), continue them on probation, with or without extending the term or modifying or enlarging the conditions; or revoke the sentence of probation and resentence the defendant under subchapter A. Upon revocation of supervised release, the defendant may be sentenced to up to 5 years in prison if the offense that resulted in the term of supervised release is a class A felony, up to 3 years in prison if such offense is a class B felony, up to 2 years in prison if such offense is a class C or D felony, or up to one year in any other case. This is in addition to any sentence that may be imposed for a new crime. A person charged with violating the conditions faces the burden of proof of showing by clear and convincing evidence at a detention hearing that they are not a flight risk or danger to the community.

The Sentencing Guidelines provide for three grades of violations. Grade A Violations are conduct constituting (A) a federal, state, or local offense punishable by a term of imprisonment exceeding one year that (i) is a crime of violence, (ii) is a controlled substance offense, or (iii) involves possession of a firearm or destructive device of a type described in 26 U.S.C. § 5845(a); or (B) any other federal, state, or local offense punishable by a term of imprisonment exceeding twenty years. Grade B Violations are conduct constituting any other federal, state, or local offense punishable by a term of imprisonment exceeding one year. Grade C Violations are conduct constituting (A) a federal, state, or local offense punishable by a term of imprisonment of one year or less; or (B) a violation of any other condition of supervision. The Guidelines state that the court "shall" revoke probation or supervised release upon a finding of a Grade A or B violation, and "may" revoke it upon a finding of a Grade C violation. The applicable guideline prison sentence for revocations is specified by a Revocation Table that takes into account the offender's Criminal History Category and the grade of the offense.

Most violations are technical violations, and the primary reason for technical violations is substance abuse. The supervised release revocation rate in 1990 was 67 percent. In 1992, 47 percent of supervised release cases were closed by violation, of which 72 percent were revoked for technical reasons not involving the commission of a new offense. By 1993, the rate had dropped to 42 percent, with about 69 percent of those revoked for technical reasons. The reason for the drop may have been that releasees who are in the early years of their term of supervised release are more likely to be revoked; when supervised release was first introduced, all of the releasees were in this high-risk category.

At first, most courts ruled that a sentence of imprisonment imposed upon revocation cannot be followed by an additional term of supervised release, unless the defendant is convicted of a new crime for which supervised release is an authorized punishment. However, this law was changed, and now states, "When a term of supervised release is revoked and the defendant is required to serve a term of imprisonment, the court may include a requirement that the defendant be placed on a term of supervised release after imprisonment. The length of such a term of supervised release shall not exceed the term of supervised release authorized by statute for the offense that resulted in the original term of supervised release, less any term of imprisonment that was imposed upon revocation of supervised release." The original 18 U.S.C. § 3583(h) had included a clause stating that the term of imprisonment had to be less than the maximum term of imprisonment authorized by 18 U.S.C. § 3583(e)(3) in order for a term of supervised release to be available, but this led to perverse effects in that, for instance, if the maximum term of imprisonment was two years, a judge could sentence a defendant to two years less one day, and then be able to sentence him to a year of supervised release. If supervision is revoked, it means the defendant spends part of supervision imprisoned, and then supervision is continued until it is terminated by the court or expires.

It was originally recommended by the Federal Courts Study Committee that the U.S. Parole Commission or a successor agency conduct hearings in supervised release cases, but this proposal was rejected by the Judicial Conference of the United States, partly because the judges felt that the judicial officer who imposed the supervised release conditions would be best able to interpret those conditions in the way that was intended at sentencing. It was also deemed desirable that supervised release revocations be subject to the same procedural safeguards as probation revocations. The Judicial Conference also opposed mandatory drug testing and mandatory revocation of probation and supervised release, requirements imposed by the Violent Crime Control and Law Enforcement Act.

The Federal Rules of Evidence generally do not apply in their normal force to supervised release revocation proceedings. The holding of revocation hearings by videoconferencing is not permitted because "virtual reality is rarely a substitute for actual presence and ... watching an event on the screen remains less than the complete equivalent of actually attending it." Probationers need not be proven guilty beyond a reasonable doubt of having committed a violation; a preponderance of the evidence suffices. In Johnson v. United States, the court found that "Although such violations often lead to reimprisonment, the violative conduct need not be criminal and need only be found by a judge under a preponderance of the evidence standard, not by a jury beyond a reasonable doubt." Hearsay is also admissible in such hearings. The courts have not been inclined to extend the sweep of the Booker and Blakely v. Washington decisions to supervised release. According to the Federal Public Defender, "In reality, there are very few full revocation proceedings. Most frequently, a deal is worked out that requires an admission of some of the charges, and an agreed-upon sentence."

Most federal appeals courts have ruled that a single positive urinalysis constitutes possession of a controlled substance warranting supervised release revocation, resulting in him being sentenced to a prison term of at least one-third the supervised release term, although it has been argued that the legislative history indicates that Congress did not intend this interpretation. The federal government considers the use of medical cannabis by probationers to be a violation. The court is not prohibited from considering the results of a drug test that shows presence of cocaine metabolites in the defendant's urine, albeit a level that is below what the contract between the testing laboratory and the Administrative Office of United States Courts requires for a positive test.

The term of supervised release that is subject to revocation is the term originally imposed by the court, not the existing unserved term of supervised release. The courts are divided on whether, when imposing a new sentence after revocation, the court can consider the seriousness of the offense, since this is a factor that Congress deliberately omitted from the list applicable to revocation sentencing. More than one revocation of supervised release is permitted. The statute provides for aggregated, rather than per violation, statutory maximum terms of imprisonment for violations of supervised release.

=== Revocation table ===
These are the prison sentences that the U.S. Sentencing Guidelines recommend imposing upon a revocation of supervised release. This table notwithstanding, the maximum term of imprisonment that can be imposed upon revocation is subject to the statutory maximum listed in the offense classes table above.

Revocation Table (in months of imprisonment)
Grade of violation	Criminal History Category					
Grade of violation	I	II	III	IV	V	VI
Grade C	3–9	4–10	5–11	6–12	7–13	8–14
Grade B	4–10	6–12	8–14	12–18	18–24	21–27
Grade A (original offense not Class A felony)	12–18	15–21	18–24	24–30	30–37	33–41
Grade A (original offense Class A felony)	24–30	27–33	30–37	37–46	46–57	51–63

== Corporate probationers ==
It was possible under the former law to place a corporation on probation. Specifically, a corporation could be sentenced to probation over a period of time not to exceed 5 years, coupled with suspension of payment of part of the fine. Corporations can be placed on probation, but corporate shareholders of the defendant corporation cannot be placed on probation without making them defendants too and giving them an opportunity to be heard. Controversial proposed amendments to the U.S. Sentencing Guidelines would encourage courts to install monitors in corporate probationers with wide-reaching powers to examine corporate records. There has also been some debate as to whether courts can order corporate probationers to make charitable contributions.

== Factors considered ==
A federal court, in determining whether to impose a term of probation and the length of the term and the conditions of the probation, is required to consider, to the extent these factors are applicable: the nature and circumstances of the offense and the history and characteristics of the defendant; the need for the sentence imposed to reflect the seriousness of the offense, to promote respect for the law, and to provide just punishment for the offense, to afford adequate deterrence to criminal conduct, to protect the public from further crimes of the defendant, to provide the defendant with needed educational or vocational training, medical care, or other correctional treatment in the most effective manner; the kinds of sentences available; the kinds of sentence and the sentencing range established for the offense by the Guidelines Commission; pertinent policy statements of the sentencing commission; the need to avoid unwarranted sentence disparities among defendants with similar records who have been found guilty of similar conduct; and the need to provide restitution to any victims of the offense.

== Length and timing ==
By law, a felony can be punished by not less than one nor more than five years of probation; a misdemeanor can be punished by not more than five years probation; and an infraction can be punished by not more than one year of probation. Supervised release is recommended by the Guidelines for most offenders who are serving a prison sentence of more than a year. The court has power to supervise the conduct of the probationer not only during the period of probation but afterwards up to the time when the maximum sentence which could have been imposed would have expired. But the period of probation is not limited by the period of maximum sentence that might have been imposed. On the other hand, probation does not become a nullity if the period of probation was not specified in the sentence, since the probationary period is limited by the maximum term of the sentence.

The United States Sentencing Guidelines provide that the term of supervised release shall be at least three years but not more than five years for a defendant convicted of a Class A or B felony; at least two years but not more than three years for a defendant convicted of a Class C or D felony; and one year for a defendant convicted of a Class E felony or a Class A misdemeanor. The U.S. Supreme Court ruled in 2000 that "[a] term of supervised release does not run during any period in which the person is imprisoned in connection with a conviction for a Federal, State, or local crime unless the imprisonment is for a period of less than 30 consecutive days." In some sex offender cases a defendant can be placed on supervised release for life. In 2007, the average length of a sentence of supervised release was 42 months.

By default, probation commences when the judge imposes sentence. However, the trial court has power to place the defendant on probation effective after a subsequent event, such as completion of service of sentence on another charge.

== Modification ==
Per 18 U.S.C. § 3583(e)(2), the U.S. District Court may "extend a term of supervised release if less than the maximum authorized term was previously imposed, and may modify, reduce, or enlarge the conditions of supervised release". Federal Rule of Criminal Procedure 32.1(c) provides that the court must hold a hearing unless the defendant has waived the hearing, or the relief sought is favorable to the defendant and does not extend the term of probation or of supervised release, and an attorney for the government has received notice of the relief sought, has had a reasonable opportunity to object, and has not done so.

== Conditions ==
The conditions of probation must be provided to the defendant in a written statement that is sufficiently clear and specific to serve as a guide for the defendant's conduct and for such supervision as is required. The District Court must state its reasons for imposing a term of supervised release where none is required by statute; appellate courts deem it inappropriate to assume that the sentencing court's reason for imposing a prison term likewise extends to its decision regarding supervised release. The conditions for probation must be reasonably related to the purposes of the Federal Probation Act, and the purposes sought to be served by probation (including rehabilitation of the probationer), the extent to which constitutional rights enjoyed by law-abiding citizens should be accorded to probationers, and the legitimate needs of law enforcement are factors considered in determining whether a reasonable relationship exists. The trial court is given wide discretion in establishing conditions of probation, and the order of the district judge providing for probation will be overturned only if it is abuse of discretion. While the court can adopt terms and conditions of probation recommended to it by an administrative agency of government, the court cannot delegate its power to fix terms and conditions of probation or to determine the parties aggrieved, the amounts to be paid, and the time and manner of payment. The court must orally give the conditions of probation, and when there is a discrepancy between conditions given orally and conditions given in writing, the oral statements control (except in situations in which the conditions in question are standard conditions). If one condition of probation is void, it does not invalidate the sentence. Failure to provide conditions does not render the probation order invalid.

=== Mandatory conditions ===
==== For all offenders ====
As required conditions for all offenders, the defendant shall not leave the federal district where he resides (without prior permission of his supervising officer), commit another federal, state or local offense; shall not unlawfully possess a controlled substance; shall refrain from any unlawful use of a controlled substance and submit to one drug test within 15 days of release on probation and at least two periodic drug tests thereafter (as determined by the court) for use of a controlled substance, but the condition stated in this paragraph may be ameliorated or suspended by the court for any individual defendant if the defendant's presentence report or other reliable information indicates a low risk of future substance abuse by the defendant; if a fine is imposed and has not been paid upon release to supervised release, shall adhere to an installment schedule to pay that fine; shall make restitution and pay the special assessment on convicted persons; shall submit to the collection of a DNA sample from the defendant at the direction of the United States Probation Office if the collection of such a sample is authorized pursuant to section 3 of the DNA Analysis Backlog Elimination Act of 2000. If the defendant fails a drug test, they may be detained pending verification of the test by gas chromatography/mass spectrometry.

Offenders are generally required to submit a monthly supervision report within the first five days of the month to the U.S. Probation office. The report asks about employment; vehicles; finances (including bank accounts, past due debts, cash inflows and outflows, major expenditures, post office boxes, safe deposit boxes, and storage units); questionings by law enforcement; arrests; dispositions of charges; contacts with others who have criminal records; firearm possession and/or access; illegal drug use and/or possession; travel outside the probation district; special assessments, restitution, and fine balances and payments; community service obligations and hours completed, missed, and remaining; and drug, alcohol, and mental health aftercare and any sessions missed. It is a class D felony to make a false statement on this report.

==== For certain offenders ====
===== Sex offenders =====
In a state in which the requirements of the Sex Offender Registration and Notification Act do not apply, a defendant convicted of a sexual offense as described in 18 U.S.C. § 4042(c)(4) shall report the address where the defendant will reside and any subsequent change of residence to the probation officer responsible for supervision, and shall register as a sex offender in any State where the person resides, is employed, carries on a vocation, or is a student. In a state in which the requirements of Sex Offender Registration and Notification Act apply, a sex offender shall (i) register, and keep such registration current, where the offender resides, where the offender is an employee, and where the offender is a student, and for the initial registration, a sex offender also shall register in the jurisdiction in which convicted if such jurisdiction is different from the jurisdiction of residence; (ii) provide information required by 42 U.S.C. § 16914; and (iii) keep such registration current for the full registration period as set forth in 42 U.S.C. § 16915;

===== Domestic violence offenders =====
If the defendant is convicted for a domestic violence crime as defined in 18 U.S.C. § 3561(b) for the first time shall attend a public, private, or private non-profit offender rehabilitation program that has been approved by the court, in consultation with a State Coalition Against Domestic Violence or other appropriate experts, if an approved program is available within a 50-mile radius of the legal residence of the defendant.

=== Other conditions ===
The former statute, 18 U.S.C.A. 3651 (1964), authorized the trial court to place a criminal defendant on probation "for such period and upon such terms and conditions as the court deems best." Courts interpreted this as meaning that "Congress obviously intended by means of the broad statutory language to invest the court with great discretion to establish conditions which would lead to the defendant's ultimate acceptance by society."

The 2nd Circuit, in U.S. v. Myers, ruled that if the liberty interest at stake in a decision involving a condition of release is fundamental, a deprivation of that liberty is "reasonably necessary" only if the deprivation is narrowly tailored to serve a compelling government interest. Courts of appeals have consistently required district courts to set forth factual findings to justify special probation conditions. It is not enough that the required findings are implicit in the record. The District Court is required to give reasons on the record for imposition of special conditions of supervised release. A district court's failure to state its reasons for conditioning supervised release results at a minimum in a remand.

==== Standard conditions ====
Standard conditions include that the defendant shall not leave the judicial district without the permission of the court or probation officer; the defendant shall report to the probation officer and shall submit a truthful and complete written report within the first five days of each month; the defendant shall answer truthfully all inquiries by the probation officer and follow the instructions of the probation officer; the defendant shall refrain from excessive use of alcohol and shall not purchase, possess, use, distribute, or administer any controlled substance or any paraphernalia related to any controlled substances, except as prescribed by a physician; the defendant shall not associate with any persons engaged in criminal activity and shall not associate with any person convicted of a felony, unless granted permission to do so by the probation officer; the defendant shall permit a probation officer to visit him or her at any time at home or elsewhere; and the defendant shall provide access to any requested financial information.

The ban on associating with persons with felony convictions has been criticized on the grounds that some releasees may have family members who have criminal records or may live in a neighborhood where most of the residents have criminal records.

==== Search and seizure ====
A condition of probation requiring the defendant to "submit to search of his person, home, or vehicle at any time of the day or night by any law enforcement or other authorized officer without their need for a search warrant" was upheld as valid in the 9th Circuit in 1976, but a very similar condition was ruled overly broad in the 9th Circuit in 1978. A similar condition was also struck down in the 7th Circuit in 2001. However, the 2006 U.S. Supreme Court decision Samson v. California eliminated any requirement of reasonable suspicion prior to a search of parolees' homes or persons.

==== Seeking or holding elective office ====
A probation condition prohibiting a former city councilman convicted under the Hobbs Act of attempting to affect commerce by extortion from seeking or serving in elected public office was affirmed. A similar outcome occurred in a case in which the defendant had violated election laws.

==== Travel restrictions ====
Even in a case in which the defendant was convicted of bringing large amounts of illegal drugs into the country, and the appellate court agreed that the defendant should not return to Israel, where his troubles began, it was ruled that the District Court must make findings in support of a restriction against travelling out of the U.S.

==== Restitution ====
The concept of community restitution was not authorized by the former U.S. federal law. Also under that law, restitution was struck down where aggrieved parties were not identified and actual damages or loss caused were not evaluated with exactitude. The District Court is without power to order restitution of an amount greater than the actual loss caused by the offense for which conviction was had, regardless of a presentence report indicating a greater amount of total losses. The order to make restitution cannot extend to sums pertaining to crimes for which the defendant was neither indicted, tried, nor convicted. There seems to be a circuit split as to whether a defendant can be ordered to repay money given by the government as part of a sting operation. Under 18 U.S.C. § 3563, sentencing courts are permitted to impose restitution as a condition of release to the extent agreed to by the government and defendant in a plea agreement.

==== Fines ====
A court and the judges may not impose a fine and place a defendant on probation if the offense is punishable by fine or imprisonment. However, probation as to one count can be conditioned on payment of fine imposed under another count. If a defendant is unable to pay fees, revocation of probation for nonpayment is considered unconstitutional. But an income tax evasion defendant ordered to cooperate with the Collector of Internal Revenue in determining the amount of tax due and pay that amount could be subjected to revocation of probation if they failed to, in good faith, pay what they could on taxes, but instead concealed and fraudulently transferred assets. In a case in which a defendant was ordered to pay $1,500 in back taxes within 24 hours of sentencing, the appellate court ruled that this was acceptable since the defendant had plenty of time between conviction and sentencing in which to take care of his tax debt. In the United States, it has been ruled that probationers have no First Amendment right to avoid federal income taxes on religious grounds. Probationers are required to obey the law; tax resistance is illegal; therefore, by syllogism, probationers cannot engage in tax resistance.

==== Cohabitation ====
In U.S. v. Woods, a judge ruled in a crack cocaine case that during the first five years after her release, the defendant could not live with anyone other than a relative or spouse. The judge said this condition was needed to impose "stability" in her home. The U.S. Court of Appeals for the Fifth Circuit struck down the condition, saying it infringed "her constitutional right to liberty."

==== Reporting of significant romantic relationships ====
In the case of United States v. Reeves, the 2nd Circuit struck down a provision that the defendant notify the probation officer upon entering into a "significant romantic relationship":

We easily conclude that people of common intelligence (or, for that matter, of high intelligence) would find it impossible to agree on the proper application of a release condition triggered by entry into a "significant romantic relationship." What makes a relationship "romantic," let alone "significant" in its romantic depth, can be the subject of endless debate that varies across generations, regions, and genders. For some, it would involve the exchange of gifts such as flowers or chocolates; for others, it would depend on acts of physical intimacy; and for still others, all of these elements could be present yet the relationship, without a promise of exclusivity, would not be "significant." The history of romance is replete with precisely these blurred lines and misunderstandings. See, e.g., Wolfgang Amadeus Mozart, The Marriage of Figaro (1786); Jane Austen, Mansfield Park (Thomas Egerton, 1814); When Harry Met Sally... (Columbia Pictures 1989); He's Just Not That Into You (Flower Films 2009).

The 6th Circuit also struck down a provision of "third party risks" in regards to romantic relationships or friendships as unduly vague and a violation of due process rights. See UNITED STATES v. Sexton, Case No. 17–5373

==== Associative restrictions ====
Freedom of association may be restricted if reasonably necessary to accomplish the essential needs of the state and public order. A condition of probation requiring the defendant to "associate only with law-abiding persons" is not invalid as unconstitutionally vague and over-broad where the evidence showed that the defendant, on some 40 occasions during a 4-year period, was seen with one or more individuals with criminal records. A condition of probation requiring a defendant convicted of narcotics and firearms offenses to stay away from his daughter was upheld. In that case, the court noted that the defendant's wife was a convicted felon (indeed, she was his co-defendant) and that in the course of trying to contact his daughter, he might encounter his wife, in violation of his order not to have contact with felons. The court also noted that a condition of release need not be related to the specific offense; it is enough that it be related to the purposes of supervised release.

A requirement that a defendant who headed the "Pure American Freedom Party" and was convicted of possessing an unregistered firearm avoid associating with other skinheads and neo-Nazis was upheld. Similar conditions have been upheld in other cases involving firearms and explosives violations, including the case of James Ross, who passed out flyers for National Alliance, owners of Resistance Records, the creators of the video game Ethnic Cleansing. Likewise, a condition preventing a defendant convicted of unlawfully importing firearms into the United Kingdom from participating in any American Irish Republican movement, from belonging to any Irish organization, from participating in any Irish Catholic organization, from visiting any Irish pubs, and from accepting employment that would directly or indirectly associate him with any Irish organization, was upheld. In the Smith case, a defendant convicted of unlawfully wearing a military uniform as part of an anti-war skit was ordered to "forego any association whatever with the Students for Democratic Society Organization," and to "Discontinue your association with the members of the Humanists group with which you violated the law." The appellate court upheld this condition, noting, "Smith could have rejected probation and elected prison. He chose to enjoy the benefits of probation; he must also endure its restrictions."

==== Speech restrictions ====
A defendant convicted of obstructing a court's order related to antiabortion protests was ordered not to "harass, intimidate or picket in front of any gynecological or abortion family planning services center," and this ruling was upheld as not violating the First Amendment to the United States Constitution on the grounds that incidental restrictions of First Amendment rights to freedom of speech and association are permissible if reasonably necessary to accomplish the essential needs of the state and public order. In the Arthur Porth case, a condition of probation forbidding speaking or writing on the unconstitutionality of tax evasion laws was struck down as an unnecessary restriction on freedom of expression, but a condition prohibiting advocacy of tax evasion was upheld as valid. A district court was deemed justified in imposing a condition of probation prohibiting a defendant with a history of prior child sex abuse from being at educational or recreational facilities where children congregate, but unjustified in prohibiting the defendant from being at such facilities where children do not congregate.

==== Alcohol and drug prohibition, treatment and testing ====
The court can impose a condition that a defendant not consume alcohol. Courts can prohibit use of other legally-obtained intoxicants as well. Said condition must be reasonably related to the crime for which the defendant pleaded guilty. The court can order outpatient drug abuse treatment and alcohol testing even if the defendant has no history of drug or alcohol abuse, if the defendant has attempted suicide by overdosing on medication and has a history of unstable behavior. The court may waive the statutory drug testing requirement if the presentence report or other reliable sentencing information indicates a low risk of future substance abuse, but in some circuits is not required to do so although at least one defendant was not required to under mandatory drug testing as part of his probation where the offense was not drug-related and the defendant did not have a history of drug abuse. Nearly 680,000 federal offender urine samples were tested for drugs in 1992. Consuming 12 beers over a weekend does not constitute excessive use of alcohol as a matter of law.

==== Mental health treatment or examination ====
Court-ordered mental health treatment as a condition of probation has been upheld when the case had taken an emotional toll on the defendant and the defendant said the conviction felt "like the end of her life as she knows it" or when the defendant has a history of major depression, refusal to take antidepressants, and dangerous conduct such as taking a drug dealer he suspected of cheating his wife on a marijuana deal to a police station at gunpoint; or when the defendant has abused his own disabled daughter. But the court cannot delegate to the probation officer the authority to decide whether the defendant shall participate in a mental health program.

==== Involuntary medication ====
United States v. Cope was a case in which the U.S. Court of Appeals for the 9th Circuit held that a need for heightened findings applies to conditions of supervised release requiring the defendant "to take 'any' or 'all' medication prescribed by a medical or other treatment personnel." The 9th Circuit has ruled that a condition of supervised release "compelling a person to take antipsychotic medication is an especially grave infringement of liberty," so much so that "a thorough inquiry is required before a court" may include it as a special condition of release.

==== Employment ====
Although courts have indicated unwillingness to uphold absolute occupational prohibitions that impose unnecessary hardship and have nothing to do with the offense, in some cases they have found that banning a defendant from a particular occupation (e.g. financial executive) is acceptable since all employment is not foreclosed by such a condition.

==== Third party notification ====
In the Peterson case, it was ruled that a bank larceny defendant with a prior incest conviction could not be ordered to reveal to employers his incest conviction, because "an occupational restriction must be based on the offense of conviction." A condition ordering a defendant to notify his tax preparation clients of his conviction for aiding and abetting preparation of false income tax was struck down because the court did not make findings that the condition was reasonably necessary to protect the public and that it was the minimum occupational restriction needed to protect the public.

==== Child support ====
Although a district court can require a defendant to comply with a preexisting child support order as a condition of supervised release, the court cannot require the defendant to pay his child support obligations at a rate different than that established by the state court, because family relations are a traditional area of state concern.

==== Halfway house ====
A probationary requirement of residence in a halfway house is allowed because the defendant's ability to work full-time, leave the facility with permission and have visitors on weekends prevent it from being tantamount to imprisonment; according to the 11th Circuit, any deprivations of the defendant's liberty are in accordance with the punitive deterrent and rehabilitative purposes of punishment. A defendant can be required to pay subsistence fee in addition to the maximum fine allowed if the halfway house is a private entity, because in that case, it cannot be counted as a fine.

==== Disclosure of information ====
A probationary condition that a defendant testify under oath on all questions as to his financial condition relating to amounts and locations of all assets was upheld as legal because the defendant made a blanket refusal to answer any questions, and therefore it could not be shown that his right against self-incrimination under the Fifth Amendment to the United States Constitution was violated by any particular question. It was ruled that a court did not abuse its discretion in requiring, as a condition of supervised release, that the defendant report financial obligations in excess of $250 incurred by his wife. The condition was held to serve a legitimate monitoring purpose in light of the defendant's history of masking his income and ownership of assets, and the financial information was also deemed necessary for evaluating the defendant's ability to meet his restitution schedule.

==== Firearms ====
Pursuant to 18 U.S.C. § 922(g), it is another felony for a felon to possess a firearm in the United States, and terms of probation for felons typically include a prohibition on possessing firearms. But it is not necessarily required for nonviolent misdemeanors. It was permitted for a federal court to prohibit an Indian boy to possess a firearm until age 21, even though it infringed on his religious rite of passage of participation in a tribal hunt.

==== Penile plethysmography requirement ====
The United States Court of Appeals for the Ninth Circuit recently addressed the procedures required before a supervised release program could include penile plethysmograph testing.

==== Pornography restrictions ====
The Ninth Circuit has ruled that banning a defendant from possessing "any pornographic, sexually oriented or sexually stimulating materials" is unconstitutionally vague. However, that circuit has also ruled that a defendant's right to free speech may be abridged to effectively address his sexual deviance problem.

==== Internet restrictions ====
Internet restrictions as conditions of supervised release under United States federal law have been somewhat controversial. A blanket prohibition from accessing the Internet is a legal supervised release condition under the U.S. federal sentencing guidelines provided that there is a reasonable relation between the underlying offense and the characteristics of defendant. Thus, such restrictions are most common in cases involving downloading of child pornography, online solicitation of sex with children, threats made via Internet, computer hacking, etc. As a result of his supervised release conditions, for three years Kevin Mitnick was unable to act as a consultant for any computer related subject or communicate via email. Christopher Painter, Deputy Chief, of the U.S. Department of Justice's Computer Crime and Intellectual Property Section, has said:

In many hacker cases, the defendants have engaged in illegal conduct over a protracted period, are recidivists, or have otherwise demonstrated that they are unlikely to refrain from illegal hacking even after a conviction or imprisonment. In these cases, restrictive conditions that proscribe certain kinds of otherwise lawful conduct, such as use of aliases, association with other hackers, or, in extreme cases, access to computers and computer networks, serve to protect the public. This is particularly true when the sentence of imprisonment is either relatively short or where probation is imposed, despite the destructiveness of a defendant's conduct, or because the full extent of a defendant's activities is not determined. In other cases, particularly where the defendant is young, there is a good chance of rehabilitation. In these cases, supervised release or probation conditions can aid a defendant's rehabilitation by controlling or monitoring his access to those things that have tempted him in the past.

The United States Court of Appeals for the Second Circuit vacated a condition imposed on a child pornography offender that required that "[T]he defendant shall consent to the installation of systems that will enable the Probation office or its designee to monitor and filter computer use on a regular or random basis and any computer owned or controlled by the defendant. The defendant shall consent to unannounced examinations of any computer equipment owned or controlled by the defendant which may result in the retrieval and copying of all data from the computer and any internal or external peripherals and may involve removal of such equipment for the purpose of conducting a more thorough investigation," on the grounds that it was overbroad. However, in a case involving a defendant deemed to be at risk of contacting young children and soliciting sex with them, a total Internet ban was affirmed by the Second Circuit. The court ruled in U.S. v. Peterson:

The computer/Internet restrictions prohibit the defendant outright from possessing or using a computer that includes either a modem, an Internet account, a mass storage device, or a writable or re-writable CD Rom. Computers and Internet access have become virtually indispensable in the modern world of communications and information gathering. The fact that a computer with Internet access offers the possibility of abusive use for illegitimate purposes does not, at least in this case, justify so broad a prohibition ... Although a defendant might use the telephone to commit fraud, this would not justify a condition of probation that includes an absolute bar on the use of telephones. Nor would defendant's proclivity toward pornography justify a ban on all books, magazines, and newspapers.

The United States Court of Appeals for the Third Circuit approved a decade-long Internet ban for a sex offender. However, a lifetime ban on Internet use was struck down by that circuit. In a case involving a counterfeiter who employed scanner, computer, and printer to counterfeit currency but did not utilize any other devices, and in no way involved or relied upon the internet, electronic bulletin boards, or other networks, the Ninth Circuit struck down a condition that stated, "The defendant shall use only those computers and computer-related devices, screen user names, passwords, email accounts, and internet service providers (ISPs), as approved by the Probation Officer ... All computers, computer-related devices, and their peripheral equipment, used by the defendant, shall be subject to search and seizure and the installation of search and/or monitoring software and/or hardware, including unannounced seizure for the purpose of search."

The United States Court of Appeals for the Seventh Circuit overturned a condition that "The defendant shall be prohibited from access to any Internet Services without prior approval of the probation officer," finding that, despite a few child pornography images having been found on the defendant's computer in the midst of a fraud investigation, he did not have "a record of extensive abuse of digital communications that could justify an outright ban."

The United States Court of Appeals for the Tenth Circuit ordinarily applies an abuse of discretion standard of review in reference to sentencing decisions, but applies a higher plain error standard when no timely objection to a condition was raised in District Court. In U.S. v. Walser, the 10th Circuit ruled, in reference to a condition prohibiting the defendant from using the Internet without the probation officer's permission, that the "vagueness of the special condition leaves open the possibility that the probation office might unreasonably prevent Mr. Walser from accessing one of the central means of information-gathering and communication in our culture today," but nonetheless affirmed because it was not "persuaded this concern rises to the level necessary to clear the extremely high hurdle set by the plain error standard". This position was reinforced by U.S. v. Zinn, in which the 10th Circuit acknowledged that its position was in disagreement with that expressed by the 3rd Circuit in United States v. Freeman and by the 2nd Circuit in United States v. Sofsky. The decision in the Zinn case was also in contrast to an earlier decision, U.S. v. White, which overturned an Internet restriction. The difference is that in the White case, the condition stated that the defendant "shall not possess a computer with Internet access throughout his period of supervised release," while the conditions imposed in the Walser and Zinn cases allowed the probation officer to grant permission, which the 10th Circuit held "more readily accomplishes the goal of restricting use of the Internet and more delicately balances the protection of the public with the goals of sentencing."

==== Miscellaneous ====
An order of probation requiring the defendant to donate a pint of blood to the Red Cross blood bank was ruled to be an unwarranted invasion of the physical person of the defendant. Because of Congress' plenary authority over the exclusion or expulsion of aliens, a court did not have the authority to order as a condition of probation that the defendant, an alien, leave the country. A condition was also struck down that forbade a defendant from causing the conception of any more children other than with his wife unless he was supporting his other children; the court stated, "Short of having a probation officer follow Smith twenty-four hours a day, there is no way to prevent Smith from fathering more children." A condition banning the defendant from watching television, as a means of promoting self-reflection and remorse, was struck down; the court found that "because other amusements are available to him at home, there is no reason to assume that in the absence of televised entertainment he will tend to his conscience. Bello cites radio and the Internet as ways he might spend his time at home without resort to silent introspection. He could add crosswords and jigsaw puzzles, not to mention light reading. For all the record shows or the district court has found, Bello is as likely to occupy his mind by planning his next crime as anything else."

It has been argued that RFID chipping of sex offenders could be politically feasible and allowable under the U.S. Constitution.

== Appellate review and habeas corpus ==
Probation or supervised release is considered custody for purposes of federal habeas corpus law, and therefore can be challenged under 28 U.S.C. § 2255. Probation officers are entitled to qualified immunity from probationers' due process claims because probationers cannot claim a property interest in the statutory procedural protections.

== Drafting errors ==
There were legislative drafting errors in the statute's drug-testing provisions and in the reference to community confinement as an authorized condition of supervised release, but the courts upheld legislative intent.
