= Assaulting, kidnapping, and assassinating the government officials of the United States =

Crime in the United States

Assaulting, kidnapping, and assassinating the government officials of the United States, their families, and foreign dignitaries and official guests, is a crime under various statutes, including 18 U.S.C. § 111 (Assaulting, resisting, or impeding certain officers or employees), 18 U.S.C. § 112 (Protection of foreign officials, official guests, and internationally protected persons), 18 U.S.C. § 115 (Influencing, impeding, or retaliating against a Federal official by threatening or injuring a family member), 18 U.S.C. § 351 (Congressional, Cabinet, and Supreme Court assassination, kidnapping, and assault), and 18 U.S.C. § 1751 (Presidential and Presidential staff assassination, kidnapping, and assault). Senator Robert Byrd stated, in introducing the bill that became 18 U.S.C. 351, "This legislation is needed to protect representative democracy. Passage would help guarantee the right of any Member of Congress to fulfill his constitutional duties and responsibilities as an elected official of our country." Until 1982, the legislation was silent as to the court's reach, but now it has been clarified that the court has extraterritorial jurisdiction over these offenses.

Minor assault or simple assault is usually punished as a misdemeanor with a base offense level of 4. When physical contact occurs or a deadly weapon is possessed and threatened, it typically escalates to a felony with a higher offense level, and when injury occurs, the penalties increase still further. When there was intent to commit murder, still higher penalties apply. Life imprisonment or the death penalty applies in cases of successful murder. Major penalties apply to kidnapping.

== See also ==
- Threatening the president of the United States
- Threatening government officials of the United States
- Threatening terrorism against the United States
- List of United States presidential assassination attempts and plots
