= Assaulting, resisting, or impeding certain United States Government officers or employees =

Statutory offense in the United States

Assaulting, resisting, or impeding certain United States Government officers or employees is an offense under 18 U.S.C. § 111. Simple assault is a class A misdemeanor, but if physical contact occurs, the offense is a class D felony. If a deadly weapon is used or bodily injury is inflicted, it is a class C felony. Threatening the government officials of the United States, particularly law enforcement officers, can in some cases fall under this statute.

It has been argued that the fundamental aim of this law was not to protect individual governmental officers, but to guard against the victimization of "government and its functions." However, the courts have found that sparse legislative history makes it equally plausible that the statute was designed to protect individual officers. The offense has a base offense level of 10, and the official victim enhancement does not apply because "the base offense level incorporates the fact that the victim was a governmental officer performing official duties." Enhancements do apply, however, if the offense involved physical contact; or if a dangerous weapon (including a firearm) was possessed and its use was threatened; or if the victim sustained bodily injury. Harsher penalties, under a separate guideline, apply to aggravated assault (i.e. a felonious assault that involved (A) a dangerous weapon with intent to cause bodily injury (i.e., not merely to frighten) with that weapon; (B) serious bodily injury; or (C) an intent to commit another felony.) A threat of force will satisfy the statute.

== See also ==
- Assassinating, kidnapping, and assaulting the government officials of the United States
