= Threatening terrorism against the United States =

Crime in the United States

Threatening terrorism against the United States is a class C felony punishable by up to 10 years' imprisonment under 18 U.S.C. § 2332b(c)(1)(g). The elements of the offense are that someone willfully threatens to commit a crime that will result in death or great bodily harm; the threat is made with the specific intent that it be taken as a threat; the threat is so unequivocal, unconditional, and specific as to convey a gravity of purpose and immediate prospect of execution; the threat actually causes fear in the victim; and the fear is reasonable.

Laws governing such threats were passed after the September 11, 2001 attacks. The law was amended by the Terrorist Hoax Improvements Act of 2007. False information and hoaxes pertaining to attacks on U.S. officials, government buildings, airplanes, etc. are also punishable under 18 U.S.C. § 1038 as a class D felony, which is punishable by up to 5 years' imprisonment.

== See also ==
- Disposition Matrix
- Domestic terrorism in the United States
- Stalking
- Threatening government officials of the United States
- Threatening the president of the United States
