= RightForge =

Internet hosting company

RightForge was an American limited liability company, founded in 2021, aimed at providing "cancel-proof" internet hosting for conservative causes. Its CEO, Martin Avila, described the company as "absolutely ideological".

It provided the original infrastructure for the Donald Trump-backed social media network Truth Social.

In late August 2022, Fox Business reported that RightForge had claimed that it was owed $1.6M by Truth Social, and was planning legal action over the dispute.
