= Official victim =

The official victim enhancement is a 3- or 6-level increase under the U.S. Sentencing Guidelines that applies when a person knowingly commits a crime against a government official and is motivated by that person's status. The provision also states, "If the official victim is an exceptionally high-level official, such as the President or the Vice President of the United States, an upward departure may be warranted due to the potential disruption of the governmental function." There are many crimes against federal officials that do not require, as an element of the offense, that the offender know the status of the victim, but this enhancement does. The victimization of the government official need not be the offense of conviction; it is possible, for instance, for the defendant to be convicted of robbing a bank and to get the official victim enhancement for harming a uniformed police officer as he escapes. The assault on the officer is considered relevant conduct. In cases involving threats against the President of the United States, courts have applied the official victim enhancement, rejecting arguments that in order for it to apply, "the President actually [had] been harmed, or ... [knew] of the existence of the defendant's letter." There has been a circuit split in the federal appellate courts as to whether crimes against local government officials qualify for the official victim enhancement. 0.1% of federal cases involve the official victim enhancement.

The term "official victim" also is used in victimology to refer to a four-stage process in which a person progresses from being a harmed, injured or suffering person(s) to perceiving or defining oneself as a victim, to claiming the victim role from social control agents or significant others and then to social control agents' recognition of the role claim — becoming an 'official victim' and receiving compensatory and supportive actions by social control agents.
