= Truth Social =

American alt-tech social media platform

- Website type: Social networking service
- Available in: English and Portuguese
- Founded: October 20, 2021; 5 years ago in Sarasota, Florida
- Area served: Australia; Brazil; Canada; Germany; Japan; Mexico; Turkey; United States
- Owner: Trump Media & Technology Group (TMTG)
- Founders: Donald Trump; Andy Dean; Wes Moss
- CEO: Kevin McGurn
- Website: truthsocial.com
- Registration: Required
- Users: Estimated 6.3 million monthly active users (as of January 2025)
- Launched: February 21, 2022; 4 years ago
- Current status: Active
- Native clients on: Android; iOS; web
- Written in: Java; JavaScript; Ruby on Rails

Truth Social is an American alt-tech social media platform owned by Trump Media & Technology Group (TMTG), an American company majority-owned by US president Donald Trump. It has been called a "Twitter clone" that competes with Parler, Gab, Bluesky and Mastodon in trying to provide an alternative to Twitter and Facebook.

The service was launched in February 2022, created in response to Trump's bans from major social networks after the January 6 Capitol attack. It is a self-styled "free-speech" alternative to mainstream platforms, catering primarily to a conservative and pro-Trump user base. Since mid-2022, it has faced financial and regulatory issues. It was unavailable on Google Play because of policies prohibiting content with physical threats and incitement to violence, but approved in October 2022 after agreeing to enforce policies against incitement.

Digital World Acquisition Corp. (DWAC), the special-purpose acquisition company formed to fund Truth Social's parent company TMTG and take it public, disclosed in 2023 that it was refunding investors the $1 billion it had raised for TMTG. A 2023 financial disclosure by DWAC indicated Truth Social had made a cumulative loss of at least $31 million since its inception. In 2024, DWAC shareholders voted to merge with TMTG, with the merged company trading on Nasdaq. In May 2024, TMTG's regulatory filing for the first quarter of 2024 reported $328 million in losses, resulting from taking the company public, and $770,000 in revenue.

As of October 2025, Truth Social placed 38th in YouGov rankings of the most popular social apps and websites. In February 2026, Similarweb ranked the Truth Social website the 24th highest social media network in the United States by traffic.

Estimates in early 2025 suggested 6.3 million monthly active users—small compared with major rivals. Truth Social has faced multiple regulatory and legal investigations, including scrutiny from the SEC and DOJ over financial disclosures and accounting practices. The platform has drawn criticism for content moderation inconsistencies, misinformation, and its role in Trump’s political and media ecosystem.

== History ==
=== Background ===
U.S. President Donald Trump raised the prospect of building a new social media platform after he was banned from Facebook and Twitter in 2021, following the 2021 United States Capitol attack In May 2021, Trump launched "From the Desk of Donald J. Trump", a web page where he posted short tweet-like announcements; it was shut down after less than a month, with Trump's senior aide Jason Miller confirming it would not be coming back.

=== Inception ===
According to Reuters, two members of the cast of Trump's TV show The Apprentice, Wes Moss and Andy Litinsky, were "central" to the founding of Truth Social's parent company, the Trump Media & Technology Group (TMTG), having allegedly pitched the idea of a social network to Trump in January 2021.

==== Blank-check company and Chinese finance ====
To facilitate becoming a publicly traded company, a special-purpose acquisition company (SPAC) called Digital World Acquisition Corp (DWAC) was created with the help of ARC Capital, a Shanghai-based firm specializing in listing Chinese companies on American stock markets that has been a target of SEC investigations for misrepresenting shell corporations. ARC also provided at least $2 million to get DWAC off the ground through a Singapore-based fund. Led by China-based banker Abraham Cinta, ARC Capital's global links included offices in Shanghai, Wuhan, Mexico City, and Jakarta, which Bloomberg News described as "surprising", due to Trump's comments on various foreign countries in office. Some investors were surprised to learn their investment money was being used to finance a Trump company. The DWAC chief executive Patrick Orlando, a Florida-based financier and former Deutsche Bank trader, was also the chief executive of the Wuhan-based Yunhong Holdings/Yunhong International, registered in the offshore tax haven of the Cayman Islands. In an October 2021 SEC filing, the special-purpose acquisition company Yunhong International stated its goal was to "capitalize on growing opportunities created by consumer/lifestyle businesses that have their primary operations in Asia." Reuters quoted a deleted presentation from 2020, in which ARC Capital said it "was able to craft a Wuhan-based SPAC sponsored by a family office, structured by ARC in Singapore, to allow our client to enjoy the flexibility and benefits of the U.S. financial markets." Yunhong was liquidated in December 2021, while its backers remained involved with the DWAC and Truth Social venture. An additional backer of the Trump social media venture, becoming the CFO of Digital World Acquisition, was Brazilian parliamentarian Luiz Philippe of Orléans-Braganza, a monarchist allied with Jair Bolsonaro.

==== Promotion and early reception ====
In October 2021, TMTG published a document outlining the Truth Social platform, citing a poll saying one-third of the U.S. population polled had stated they would use a social media platform endorsed by Trump. On October 20, TMTG issued a press release announcing the platform would have its public launch in "the first quarter of 2022." It was slated to enter limited beta for Apple iOS in November 2021, and though it did not meet this schedule for its beta testing, Trump claimed in December 2021 "invited guests" were already using the beta system.

Hours after the press release, a person identifying themselves as a part of the hacker collective Anonymous used Shodan to discover domains related to the company, eventually locating what appeared to be a publicly-accessible mobile beta of the service. The URL, which permitted users to sign up and use the platform, was leaked across social media. Users began trolling, creating parody accounts, and posting rants and memes. Users were able to sign up with usernames of high-profile individuals including Trump, Mike Pence, and Jack Dorsey. The link was later taken offline.

==== Russian finance ====
According to The Guardian, in December 2021, two loans totaling $8 million (~$9.36 million in 2025) were paid to Trump Media from obscure Putin-connected entities as the company was "on the brink of collapse". $2 million was paid by Paxum Bank, part-owned by Anton Postolnikov, a relation of Aleksandr Smirnov, a former Russian government official who now runs the Russian maritime company Rosmorport. $6 million was paid by an ostensibly separate entity, ES Family Trust, whose director was the director of Paxum Bank at the same time. As of March 2023, prosecutors in the US Attorney for the Southern District of New York were investigating the Russian ties. The Washington Post reported that Trump Media paid a $240,000 finder's fee as part of the arrangement, allegedly to a party associated with Digital World.

The federal probe into investors of DWAC, according to The Washington Post, discovered that a wealthy investor in the company was allegedly connected to attempts to allegedly move assets from Russia, Ukraine, and China into the Caribbean, and other intermediaries such as Hong Kong, United Kingdom, and Belize. According to a government transcript, an informant referenced the process as "the full Singapore with a double dip, as we call it, with having the U.K. thrown in there, just to give it that added cleanliness and polishing off."

=== Reactions ===
The New York Times described Truth Social as an addition to the field of already-existing alt-tech platforms. BBC journalist James Clayton stated the platform could be a more successful version of other alt-tech social media platforms like Parler and Gab and is an attempt by Trump to gain his "megaphone" back. Gettr CEO Jason Miller, a former Trump advisor, praised Truth Social and said the platform will cause Facebook and Twitter to "lose even more market share". Gab said in a statement it supports Truth Social and users of Gab can follow Trump on his reserved Gab account.

Among critical reactions, Chris Cillizza of CNN wrote that the platform was doomed to fail. Noah Berlatsky, writing for The Independent, described it as a "potential threat to democracy". The Forward raised concerns of antisemitism becoming prominent on the platform, noting similar platforms have become known for hosting antisemitic content, such as Parler, Gab, and Telegram. Rolling Stone observed that while Truth Social promises to be an open and free platform, Truth Social's terms of service include a clause stating users cannot disparage the service. The New York Times expressed skepticism about whether Truth Social would be able to compete effectively against rival services.

== Platform ==
=== Personnel ===
Truth Social is run by Trump Media & Technology Group, and headed by former California GOP Congressman Devin Nunes. In 2022, Talking Points Memo stated Nunes' remuneration was $750,000 per year. Other senior employees included chief of technology Josh Adams and chief of product development Billy Boozer, who both subsequently left the company.

The company's headquarters are in Sarasota, Florida. It was reported to have about 40 employees in March 2022. In October 2024, ProPublica reported that a whistleblower sent a letter alerting the board that the company had outsourced programming work to Mexico, citing concerns about the quality of the work and the split from 'America first' principles.

=== Software ===
Truth Social is modeled heavily after Twitter; users are able to make posts ("Truths", similar to tweets) and share other users' posts ("ReTruths", similar to retweets).

The Truth Social platform uses a custom version of the free and open-source social network hosting software Mastodon as its back end, which omits several Mastodon features, including polls and post visibility options. The platform uses Soapbox Technology's "Soapbox" front end instead of Mastodon's native front end. TMTG has advertised for developers with skills in using Elixir, the programming language used to build Pleroma, a social networking software compatible with Mastodon.

On October 21, 2021, the Software Freedom Conservancy group stated they suspected Truth Social had violated Mastodon's AGPLv3 license by not offering its source code to all users. The Mastodon developers then formally requested that Truth Social comply with the terms of the software license, with Truth Social publishing its source code as a ZIP file on the website on November 12, 2021. On February 22, 2022, the source code download was moved to the website's legal section. A mirror of the source code is available at GitHub, where it was uploaded by uninvolved individuals.

The service is designed for access by web browsing and as an app for both Android and Apple devices:

- In May 2022, the service launched a web app for accessing the service with a web browser, with geographical restrictions.
- On August 30, 2022, Google stated Truth Social's content moderation did not meet its standards to be available on Google Play due to violation of Google's policies prohibiting content with physical threats and incitement to violence. On October 12, 2022, Truth Social was approved for Google Play after the platform implemented stronger content moderation policies.

=== Infrastructure ===
The Truth Social service was originally hosted on RightForge, a company aimed at providing internet hosting for conservative causes that describes itself as "The first global Internet infrastructure company committed to American principles online".

In December 2021, TMTG said it had partnered with the Canadian online video platform Rumble, which was already providing cloud services to the Truth Social beta service. In April 2022, TMTG announced Truth Social would be moving to Rumble's cloud platform and announced they would be performing infrastructure upgrades to increase the platform's performance.

TMTG engaged the services of Hive, a content moderation company that uses machine learning to filter postings for unacceptable content.

As of June 2022, Truth Social uses Cloudflare as its CDN for both mobile and web traffic. Reuters reported Fastly had refused to take Truth Social on as a customer.

In July 2024, TMTG said it was purchasing streaming technology for Truth Social. Louisiana energy magnate James E. Davison is involved in the purchase under the business name JedTec LLC. In 2019, through his connections at the Trump White House, he received a $17 million federal grant to build roads. In August, the company announced plans for Truth+, a streaming service, without a specified launch date. It is intended to be integrated into Truth Social's website and apps.

=== Content policies ===
Truth Social was launched proclaiming itself as a "big tent" platform without political censorship, allowing for "free expression" without "discriminating on the basis of political ideology".

When the company was first announced in October 2021, its terms of service said the company would not be legally responsible for "the content, accuracy, offensiveness, opinions [or] reliability" of anything users might post to the service. Some commentators noted that this self-declared immunity appeared to rely on Section 230 of the Communications Decency Act, a law Trump firmly opposed during his first presidency.

The original terms of service further added that users would be forbidden to "disparage, tarnish, or otherwise harm, in our opinion, us and/or the Site". Truth Social said it had the right to "suspend or terminate your account" and "take appropriate legal action". The anti-disparagement section of the terms of service was removed in late 2022. Sexual content remains forbidden by the terms of service.

Truth Social has blocked accounts for behavior it considers harmful or inappropriate, including accounts with parody names and death threats.

==== Censorship allegations ====
The platform has been widely accused of censorship. In June 2022, several accounts were banned after posting about investigations into the 2021 United States Capitol attack and the publicly televised January 6 hearings that detailed events leading up to the mob violence on that day, in which Trump supporters breached the United States Congress, seeking to overturn the 2020 presidential election.

According to an August 2022 report from progressive consumer rights advocacy group Public Citizen, Truth Social was found to shadowban liberal and progressive users that disagree with the site's narrative, as well as a swathe of other content, including some conservative content. Truth Social has banned content mentioning abortion and the January 6 hearings. Public Citizen concluded that Truth Social's content moderation was substantially more limiting than Twitter, and said Truth Social's policies were creating an echo chamber of violent views.

== Operations ==
=== Launch ===
Trump made the platform's first post on February 16, 2022. That day, TMTG CEO Devin Nunes said he expected the platform would not completely open to the public until late March. A beta test with 500 users was in operation during February 2022.

On February 21, 2022, Truth Social was released on Apple iOS, reaching number one on the App Store's top charts. Due to an extensive backlog of applicants, upon downloading the app, about 500,000 people who initially attempted to register as users were automatically waitlisted.

The app was installed 872,000 times during its first week, but a month later, new user signup had fallen to 60,000 per week. During that time, weekly visits to truthsocial.com fell from 6 million to fewer than 2 million.

Upon its launch, the British automotive solar power company Trailar complained Truth Social's app logo closely resembled its "T" logo.

The platform has been criticized for its poor performance at launch, with waitlisting users attempting to register and extended outages. A day after its launch, The Washington Post described it as "a disaster". A week after, Newsweek reported some early adopters were beginning to lose interest in the app due to low numbers of users and poor engagement, although others were willing to persevere with the app to see if things would improve.

=== Audience growth ===
The Truth Social platform suffered from severe and persistent problems with scalability at launch, limiting the platform's growth.

In early March 2022, multiple sources reported that Truth Social usage remained low, with Trump himself not having posted to his account since his first message two weeks earlier and his account having only 140,000 followers—less than 0.2% of the 90 million followers he had on Twitter before his account was banned. The Daily Dot reported the Truth Social iOS app had fallen from the number one slot for downloads on the Apple App Store to number 84. The Daily Beast reported Trump was dissatisfied with the social network's progress.

At the end of March 2022, TheWrap reported that weekly installations of the Truth Social app had fallen from 872,000 in its launch week to around 60,000 per week, a reduction of over 90%. Visits to truthsocial.com had also fallen, from 6 million per week to 1.9 million. According to Sensor Tower, Truth Social had been downloaded 1.2 million times by late March. In early April 2022, Bloomberg News reported that shares in Truth Social's publicly traded holding company Digital World Acquisition Corp. (DWAC) had fallen 31% from the time of the app's launch in late February and 64% from its all-time high.

In early April 2022, Business Insider described Truth Social as "like a conservative ghost town that had been overrun by bots". A U.S.-based reporter for the BBC attempted to sign up in early April and was placed on a waitlist with about 1.4 million requests ahead of him.

On April 4, it was reported that Josh Adams and Billy Boozer, the platform's chief of technology and chief of product development respectively, had left the company. A report in The Washington Post stated Truth Social was "falling apart", with problems mounting on multiple fronts. A Guardian article compared Truth Social with Trump Steaks and Trump Vodka.

As of late April 2022, MarketWatch reported Truth Social had around 513,000 active daily users, compared to Twitter's reported active daily userbase of 217 million. Usership figures were not available, but Trump was reported on August 19, 2022, to have 3.9 million Truth Social followers. He had had 89 million on Twitter and 34 million on Facebook before being banned from both platforms.

As of early June 2022, SimilarWeb reported Truth Social's iOS app as ranking No. 49 in the social networking category of apps on the Apple App Store. As of October 2022, the iOS app had sunk to No. 75 in the social networking category. During May 2023, SimilarWeb's ranking of the Truth Social iOS app fluctuated wildly, ranging from #18 to No. 153 in the Apple App Store social networking category during that period.

=== Usage ===
Trump Media has not reported the number of Truth Social users. Data aggregator SimilarWeb estimated their number of visitors per month at 5 million in February 2024 and the number of active users in the U.S. at 1 million per month. On March 25, 2024, the day TMTG's stock began trading publicly, Truth Social had 277,000 U.S. visitors, while Reddit had 32 million.

By April 2024, Truth Social's daily average of active users in the U.S. had dropped 19% over the past year to around 113,000. During the same period, the daily average of active U.S. users on Twitter was down 11% to 34 million, on Reddit up 17% to 31.4 million, and on Threads up 5% to 3.5 million. The number of monthly visits from May 2023 to April 2024 was just over 4 million, down 39% compared to the period May 2022 to April 2023. Trump Media says it does not track traditional performance indicators such as daily or monthly visitor numbers, revenue per user, or ad impressions, saying in their FEC filing that they "might not align with the best interests" of the company or its stockholders.

During Trump's second term, the daily average of active users had risen to 359,000 in May 2025 but was still far below X's 131.9 million, Threads's 112.9 million, and Reddit's 66.2 million, according to SimilarWeb as reported by CNN. According to an analysis by Similarweb, in September 2026 the number of daily users was down to about 260,000 from a high of 420,000 in June 2025. The analysis showed that traffic had fallen 30% during the 12-month period ending in September 2026.

=== Acquisition of Twitter by Elon Musk ===
Following Elon Musk's acquisition of Twitter, many commentators observed that a Musk-run Twitter would be likely to reduce demand for Truth Social's services. Musk said that as of late April 2022, Truth Social iOS app downloads exceeded those of Twitter and TikTok on the same platform. He said Truth Social only existed because of Twitter's restrictions on free speech. Describing Truth Social as a "terrible name", Musk joked that it should be renamed "Trumpet".

Following Musk's comments on Twitter, the Truth Social app rose in popularity, returning to the number 1 position for free iOS apps on Apple's App Store on April 30, with the Twitter app at number 2; DWAC shares also rose in value.

DWAC's share price fell after Musk's announcement of his intention to buy Twitter. Truth Social CEO Devin Nunes later stated that Musk had been encouraged by Trump to buy Twitter; Musk denied this, saying "This is false. I've had no communication, directly or indirectly, with Trump, who has publicly stated that he will be exclusively on Truth Social." Musk subsequently said he intended to reverse Twitter's ban on Trump's Twitter account if his bid for the company was successful. Following Musk's comments, Nunes reiterated that Trump was committed to Truth Social, and would not rejoin Twitter even if his ban were to be lifted.

Following Musk's announcement in July that he no longer intended to purchase Twitter, DWAC shares rose. Musk later went through with the deal, purchased Twitter in October 2022 and after a public poll resulted in a majority of people wanting the ban to be lifted, the ban on Donald Trump was lifted in November. Donald Trump would not post to Twitter again for nearly a year, stating he preferred to use Truth Social as his primary platform.

=== Financial issues ===
As of May 2022, Truth Social had not secured any advertising revenue. TMTG stated it "expects to incur significant losses into the foreseeable future".

In late August 2022, Fox Business reported that Truth Social's hosting company RightForge claimed it was owed $1.6 million by Truth Social and was threatening to take legal action. In early September 2022, Digital World Acquisition Corp. (DWAC), the SPAC set to acquire TMTG, secured an extension from shareholders for up to six months for it to perform the deal. This left DWAC shares trading at $24, down from a 2021 high of $175. In the same month, Politico writer Jack Shafer wrote about the "slow-cooking financial disaster that has been simmering in Donald Trump's business Crock-Pot". On September 24, Reuters reported investors had withdrawn commitments of almost $140 million, following the expiry of a deadline on September 20.

On November 3, DWAC postponed the shareholder vote on the merger deal for a sixth time.

In January 2023, the New York Times reported that, while Truth Social now carried advertising, it was limited to niche products, without the participation of major brands. It reported Truth Social's burn rate at around $1.7m per month. In March 2023, The Guardian reported that "Federal prosecutors in New York involved in the criminal investigation into Donald Trump’s social media company last year started examining whether it violated money laundering statutes in connection with the acceptance of $8m with suspected Russian ties".

In September 2023, DWAC postponed the merger deadline yet again. In October 2023 DWAC disclosed in a regulatory filing that it would refund to investors the $1 billion it had raised for TMTG, the parent company of Truth Social, triggering speculation that this might lead to Truth Social's eventual demise.

A November 2023 DWAC financial disclosure indicated TMTG had generated losses such that management had "substantial doubt" about its ability to pay its bills, and the company's accounting firm had "substantial doubt" about TMTG's ability to remain in business. The Hollywood Reporter reported that Truth Social had made losses to date of between $31.5 million and $60.5 million, depending on the basis of how the accounts were interpreted. A number of news outlets had initially reported higher losses based on the report, leading Truth Social's parent company to file a lawsuit against them, accusing them of defamation.

During the 2024 presidential campaign, Trump's personal financial Federal Communications Commission (FCC) disclosure for 2023 listed the site's value range at $5–25 million.

==== Filings with the U.S. Securities and Exchange Commission for 2024 ====
On April 1, 2024, TMTG filed a report with the U.S. Securities and Exchange Commission (SEC) that showed the company had lost over $58 million in 2023 and that its only income was $4 million in advertising on Truth Social. Trump Media listed its largest expense for the year as interest payments totaling more than $39 million.

In May 2024, TMTG disclosed Truth Social's unaudited financials for the first quarter of 2024, reporting $770,000 in revenue, down from $1.1 million for the same period in 2023, and $327.6 million in losses. According to the filing, $311 million of the losses resulted from "noncash expenses arising from the conversion of promissory notes" when the company went public, and roughly half of the operating losses of $12.1 million were merger-related costs. For the second quarter of 2024, TMTG reported $837,000 in revenue and a loss of $16.4 million.

In February 2025, TMTG's filing with the Securities and Exchange Commission reported a net loss of $401 million on $3.6 million in revenue for 2024. The company also reported that CEO Devin Nunes received $47 million in compensation.

==== Filings with the U.S. Securities and Exchange Commission for 2025 ====
TMTG's filing for the first quarter of 2025 reported a total revenue of $821,000, up 6.6% from the same period in 2024, and an operating loss of $39.5 million. The loss was partially offset by interest income, resulting in a net loss of $31.7 million.

TMTG's filing for the second quarter of 2025 reported a total revenue of $883,300, up 5.5% from the same period in 2024, and an operating loss of $43.5 million. The loss was partially offset by interest and investment income, resulting in a net loss of $20 million, up from $16.4 million in the same period in 2023.

TMTG's filing for the third quarter of 2025 reported a total revenue of $972,900, down 3% from the same period in 2024, and a net loss of $54.8 million, up from $19.2 million in the same period in 2024. The company also reported $20.3 million in legal expenses.

In February 2026, TMTG's filing with the Securities and Exchange Commission reported a net loss of $712.1 million and $3.7 million in revenue for fiscal year 2025.

==== Filings with the U.S. Securities and Exchange Commission for 2026 ====
TMTG's filing for the first quarter of 2026 reported a total revenue of $870,000, up 6.6% from the same period in 2025, and an operating loss of nearly $406 million. Most of the losses stemmed from the drop in value of the bitcoins the company bought in 2025.

TMTG's filing for the second quarter of 2026 reported a revenue of $1.7 million, up 95.4% from the same period in 2025, and a net loss of $238 million, up 1,090% from the same period of 2025. The revenue mostly came from ads on Truth Social. According to TMTG's press release, the losses stemmed from the drop in value in cash assets, including more than $190 million in losses from "digital assets, digital assets pledged, and equity securities".

TMTG's filing for the third quarter of 2026 reported a revenue of $3 million, up 205% from the same period in 2025, and a net loss of $12.3 million. The revenue included $1.8 million from subscriptions to the Truth+ streaming platform and from subscribers paying monthly subscription fees of $60,000 to $100,000 for early access to Trump's posts.

=== Regulatory issues ===
In June 2022, federal regulators investigated whether TMTG had illegally coordinated with its holding company, Digital World Acquisition Corp, prior to the latter going public. A federal grand jury was empaneled as part of the investigation. TMTG released a statement saying they are cooperating with the investigation. Due to the investigation, Digital World has not merged with TMTG as planned. Digital World asked its shareholders to vote to allow an extra year to complete the merger, but as of September 6, 2022, it appeared they will not vote in favor of the extra time. If the companies do not merge, Truth Social may not receive $1.3 billion from Digital World.

Donald Trump was revealed to have left the company's board on June 8, prior to the issuing of subpoenas.

World Trademark Review reported that "Truth Social" had been applied for as a trademark in the European Union within a week of the announcement of Trump's company, and registered, potentially preventing the Truth Social service from operating in most of Europe. At the end of August 2022, the U.S. Patent and Trademark Office denied Trump Media & Technology Group's application for a trademark on "Truth Social" as two companies already use the term.

A whistleblower submission was made by Will Wilkerson to the Securities and Exchange Commission in August 2022, with original source information of alleged federal securities law violations, detailing fraudulent misrepresentations in violation of federal securities laws. Wilkerson was one of the company's earliest employees; he held the post of senior vice president of operations, and was intimately involved in internal TMTG business strategy discussions. He was dismissed from the company in October 2022.

In June 2023, U.S. prosecutors charged three Florida men for insider trading allegedly related to DWAC (Digital World Acquisition Corp) as part of Trump's social media merger deal in 2021.

On February 15, 2024, the SEC approved the merger, declaring the registration statement for DWAC's combination with TMTG to be effective after markets closed on Wednesday, February 14, 2024.

On August 1, 2026, the Trump Media & Technology Group launched a "Truth API" data feed that gave early access to posts from high-profile accounts on Truth Social, including Trump and vice-president JD Vance, for a monthly subscription fee of $100,000. On August 12, The Intercept and the Freedom of the Press Foundation filed a federal lawsuit against Trump, calling Truth API "extraordinary, corrupt and unconstitutional". On September 21, the City of San Francisco also filed a lawsuit, alleging violations of California's Unfair Competition Law, which prohibits insider trading.

== Share price and value ==
DJT stock price reached over $79 per share after its public offering, but declined thereafter.

Since its public offering, Trump Media & Technology Group Corp. has had net operating losses.

Following the merger of DWAC into TMTG, the merged company was listed on the NASDAQ stock market under the ticker symbol DJT, after Trump's initials. The share price of the company rose rapidly after the merger, reaching a price that gave the company a nominal value of $4.48 billion. It fell over the subsequent days, losing 20% on one day alone after the announcement of the company's profit and loss results over the previous year. On September 4, 2024, shares closed below $17, valuing Trump's majority stake in the company at under $2 billion on paper.

Trump was not permitted to sell his Truth Social shares or use them as collateral until six months after the merger. The stock was described as a "meme stock", with early price rises driven by speculators and small investors loyal to Trump.

== Notable activity ==
=== Donald Trump ===
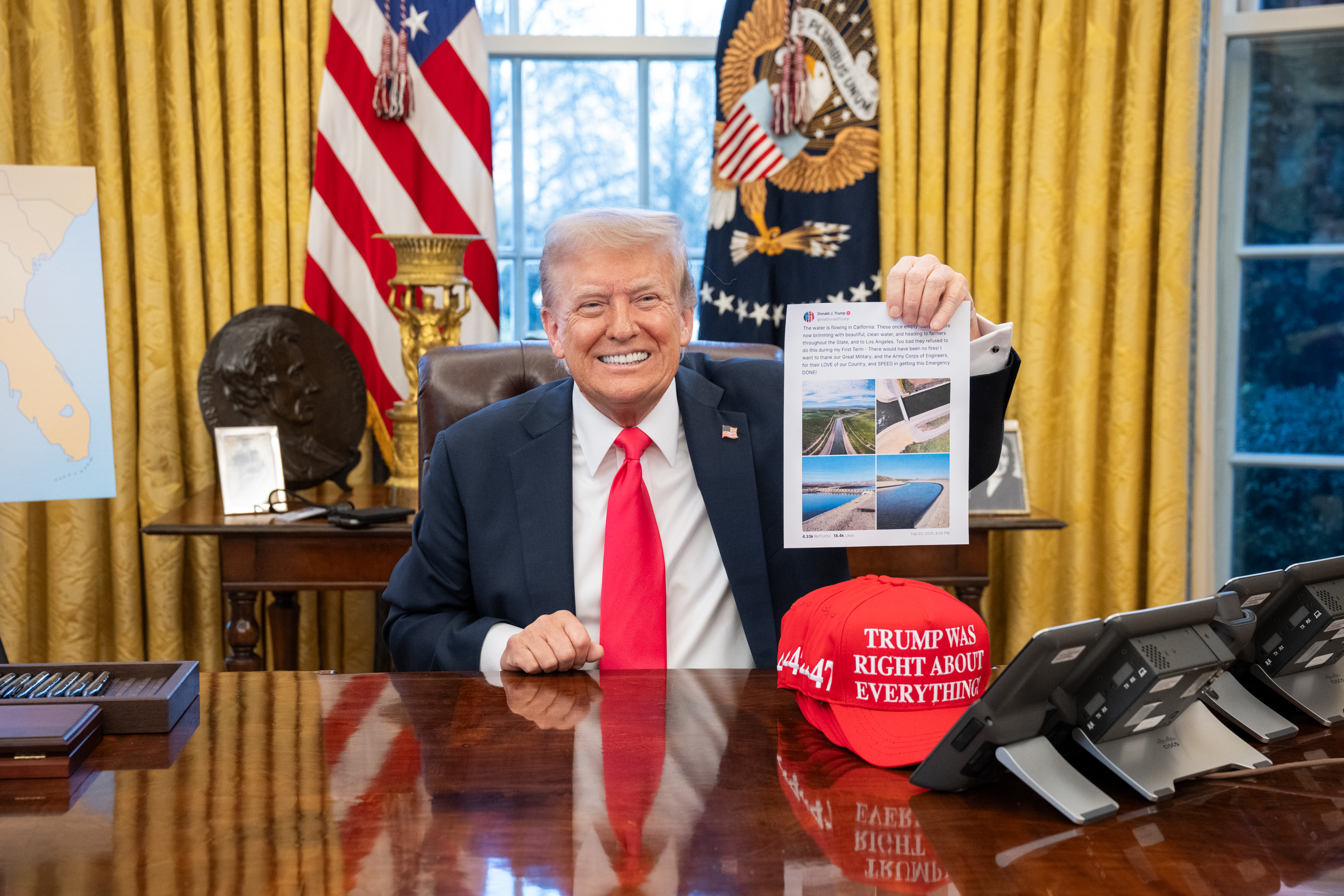
Donald Trump with a printout of a Truth Social post in 2025

==== Early use, February – July 2022 ====
Although Donald Trump's participation in TMTG and the scale of his social media following was a major part of TMTG's marketing for Truth Social, Trump was initially not a frequent user of the Truth Social platform. He made the platform's first post on February 16, 2022, with the message "Get ready! Your favorite president will see you soon". His next post was made on April 28, posting "I'M BACK! #COVFEFE", a reference to the covfefe meme. Trump then started posting more frequently.

Following the announcement of Elon Musk's proposed takeover of Twitter, Trump publicly stated that he does not intend to return to Twitter and intends to remain on Truth Social. On May 6, in a court filing responding to the New York attorney general's demand for his cell phones, Trump said Truth Social had recently given him a phone that he only uses to post on Truth Social.

According to reports, Trump has a licensing agreement with TMTG requiring him to use Truth Social as his primary social media platform and to wait at least six hours before reposting material to any other social media platform, with some exceptions for political activities.

==== After the Mar-a-Lago raid, August – September 2022 ====
In early August 2022, Truth Social experienced a significant increase in downloads following the FBI search of Mar-a-Lago.

Following the publication of a heavily redacted affidavit regarding the search, Trump reacted angrily to the contents of the document in a series of Truth Social posts, saying "Affidavit heavily redacted!!! [...] Nothing mentioned on 'Nuclear,' a total public relations subterfuge by the FBI & DOJ, or our close working relationship regarding document turnover - WE GAVE THEM MUCH." The commentator Barbara McQuade observed that Trump's Truth Social posts on the matter might potentially undermine Trump's defense against charges arising from the search.

Trump followed this days later with a sequence of sixty Truth Social posts. Multiple news sources noted that these posts represented a marked increase in the intensity of his rhetoric, explicitly referencing QAnon and 4chan conspiracy theories.

==== Since October 2022 ====
In October 2022, Trump posted a comment criticizing American Jews, telling them to "get their act together and appreciate what they have in Israel" before it's "too late". Three organizations, including the Anti-Defamation League and the Jewish Democratic Council of America, criticized Trump's comment as condescending and as repeating a "dual loyalty" antisemitic trope. Rabbi Yaakov Menken, managing director at the Coalition for Jewish Values, on the contrary, stated that he supported Trump's comments and did not consider them as antisemitic.

In November 2022, Trump released a post claiming without evidence that he had "sent in the FBI and the U.S. Attorneys" in 2018 to assist in the Florida gubernatorial election of Ron DeSantis.

On 4 December 2022, Trump used his Truth Social account to say alleged election fraud allows for the "termination" of election rules found in the Constitution of the United States, stating:

So, with the revelation of MASSIVE & WIDESPREAD FRAUD & DECEPTION in working closely with Big Tech Companies, the DNC, & the Democrat Party, do you throw the Presidential Election Results of 2020 OUT and declare the RIGHTFUL WINNER, or do you have a NEW ELECTION? A Massive Fraud of this type and magnitude allows for the termination of all rules, regulations, and articles, even those found in the Constitution. Our great "Founders" did not want, and would not condone, False & Fraudulent Elections!

Trump's remarks were condemned by multiple parties, including the White House. In The Week, Damon Linker described it as the moment Trump "finally jumped the shark". Subsequently, Trump denied he called for the termination of the Constitution but maintained that any election misconduct should be undone.

In August 2023, following special counsel's Jack Smith's indictment of Trump for charges related to the 2020 presidential election, Trump posted "IF YOU GO AFTER ME, I’M COMING AFTER YOU!" to Truth Social. Investigators referred Trump's remarks to the judge responsible for the case, seeking a protective order.

On August 25, 2023, Trump posted to X/Twitter regarding his arrest in Georgia in regard to the Georgia election racketeering prosecution. This was his first use of social media outside of Truth Social for some years.

==== 2024 trial ====
In April 2024, Trump was held in contempt of court in a New York court in relation to Truth Social posts about his hush money trial that violated a gag order made by the court. To comply with orders from the court, Trump deleted the postings from Truth Social.

==== 2025 AI-generated video ====
As a response to the October No Kings protests, Trump posted an AI-generated video on his Truth Social account that showed him flying a fighter jet and dropping liquid feces on protesters. The video sparked various reactions on the internet, like outrage and ridicule. Speaker of the House Mike Johnson justified the video, describing it as "satire" posted to make a "point".

=== Devin Nunes ===
Devin Nunes, the CEO of Truth Social, posted a meme on the platform in October 2022 making a joke about the attack on Paul Pelosi, while referencing inaccurate reports that the attacker was in his underwear at the time. Nunes was widely criticized by Twitter users for doing this.

=== Gavin Newsom ===
On June 16, 2022, California Governor Gavin Newsom announced he had joined Truth Social, writing on his Twitter account "I just joined Trump's Truth Social. Going to be on there calling out Republican lies. This could get…interesting. My first post – breaking down America's red state murder problem." As of August 2024, his account still exists as a verified user and he has still been semi-active on the platform.

=== Use by right-wing extremists ===
Truth Social has been described as an alt-tech social media platform. Such platforms are popular among the alt-right, far-right, and others who espouse extremism or fringe theories, often because they employ less stringent content moderation than mainstream platforms.

Axios reported that Truth Social had given a verified account to the white nationalist advocate Nick Fuentes, who has been banned from Twitter and Facebook.

On August 11, 2022, a gunman, identified as Ricky Shiffer, wearing body armor and armed with a nail gun and an AR-15 style rifle attempted to storm the offices of the Federal Bureau of Investigation (FBI) in Cincinnati, Ohio. Following a subsequent police pursuit, he was killed in a standoff with police. Shiffer had published multiple posts on Truth Social in the days before the attack, following the FBI search of Mar-a-Lago, in which he expressed his desire to engage in violence and called for the killings of FBI agents. He also reportedly wrote a post on Truth Social following the attack, which detailed his failed attempt to storm the building. Since Shiffer's actions, some Truth Social users — including a verified account with 74,000 followers who said he was a designer for the site — claimed the attack was a false flag, without providing evidence, and the calls for violence were posts planted by federal law enforcement officials or Democratic operatives.

In August 2023, Truth Social notified the FBI that Craig DeLeeuw Robertson had used Truth Social to make death threats against President Joe Biden. Robertson was later shot and killed at an armed standoff with FBI agents. Robertson, who had previously made death threats to multiple people and posted that he had a rifle he described as a "democrat eradicator", was a registered Republican who described himself as a "Maga Trumper".

=== Bot accounts ===
Axios reported in February 2022 that Truth Social had official-looking accounts for Fox News, TMZ, the National Football League, NASA, NASCAR, and others with legitimate-appearing links and logos, which had not been created by the named entities. The accounts were labelled as "bot" accounts. The Fox News account has since been verified by the platform. By April 2022, a bot account for The New York Times was labeled "The Failing NY Times", while a CNN bot account was labeled "CNN (Parody)".

=== Biden re-election campaign ===
The Biden–Harris 2024 re-election campaign created an account on Truth Social in October 2023 known as "BidenHQ". It announced on the social media platform Twitter that it had created the account on Truth Social because it found the idea "very funny". Numerous observers characterised this as an exercise by the Biden campaign in trolling Donald Trump. Two days after the creation of the account, Axios reported that the Biden campaign's Truth Social account had more followers than that of the Trump campaign. The account was later rebranded as "HarrisHQ" in July 2024 following Joe Biden's withdrawal from the election and endorsement of Vice President Kamala Harris, who later became the Democratic nominee for president but ultimately lost the general election to Trump.

== See also ==
- List of social networking services
- Social media use by Donald Trump
