= Killing of Craig DeLeeuw Robertson =

2023 killing in Provo, Utah

Craig Robertson
- Born: Craig DeLeeuw Robertson; July 1, 1948; Spanish Fork, Utah, U.S.
- Died: August 9, 2023 (aged 75); Provo, Utah, U.S.
- Cause of death: Gunshot wounds
- Political party: Republican
- Criminal charges: Interstate Threats; Influencing, Impeding, and Retaliating Against Federal Law Enforcement Officers by Threat; Threats Against the President

Craig DeLeeuw Robertson (July 1, 1948 – August 9, 2023) was an American firearm collector who received three felony charges, including threatening the president of the United States, interstate threats against government officials, and threats against federal law enforcement officers. On August 9, 2023, FBI agents attempted to serve search and arrest warrants at his Provo, Utah, home. Robertson resisted arrest and allegedly pointed a revolver at the agents, who shot and killed him.

== Early life and career ==
Robertson was the son of Carma (née DeLeeuw; 1924–2008) and Maughn T. Robertson (1918–1998). He graduated from Orem High School in Orem, Utah, in 1966 and, according to his LinkedIn profile, attended Brigham Young University. He served in the United States Air Force from 1970 to at most 1974, with Chanute Air Force Base in Illinois as his last duty station and his specialty being metalworker helper. He retired after working as a welding inspector.

== 2018 incident ==
In August 2018, two Google Fiber employees knocked on Robertson's door with the intent to work on a utility pole in his back yard. When Robertson did not answer, they accessed the pole and started work. Per police reports, he allegedly pointed a handgun at the workers and started yelling at them when he saw them. Law enforcement officers responded, at which time Robertson was holding an AR-15 rifle he refused to put down. A police report said his actions "...triggered a bit of a stand off", though Robertson eventually lowered the gun; no charges ended up being filed. Law enforcement stayed on the scene while the Google Fiber employees finished the installation.

Salt Lake City TV station KSTU submitted a public records request to obtain the body camera footage from the incident. The footage was released by Fox 13 on August 18, 2023.

== 2022–2023 threats ==
In September 2022, Robertson allegedly posted online, "The time is right for a presidential assassination or two. First Joe then Kamala!!!" He also allegedly posted a picture of a rifle captioned, "My democrat eradicator!!!" Robertson also allegedly threatened New York attorney general Letitia James and had "patriotic dreams" of shooting Governor of California Gavin Newsom with "my S&W M&P 9mm" and shooting US attorney general Merrick Garland "dead center in his forehead". In November 2022, he indicated he had nine firearms including at least three rifles and intended to buy an additional three for "getting ready for the 2024 election cycle."

In March 2023, Robertson allegedly posted a photo of a nickel that he shot in the year 1982 from 100 yards with a caption reading, "Well, I did it to Jefferson right on the temple. Bet I can do it to old Joey and save the world!!!" On March 18, Robertson made a threat on Truth Social directed at the Manhattan district attorney:

ALVIN BRAGG

Heading to New York to fulfill my dream of iradicating [sic] another of George Soros two-but [sic] political hach [sic] DAs. I'll be waiting in the courthouse parking garage with my suppressed Smith & Wesson M&P 9mm to smoke a radical fool prosecutor that should never have been elected. I want to stand over Bragg and put a nice hole in his forehead with my 9mm and watch him twitch as a drop of blood oozes from the hole as his life ebbs away to hell!!

BYE, BYE, TO ANOTHER CORRUPT BASTARD!!!

— Craig Robertson

Truth Social alerted the FBI National Threats Operations Center ("NTOC") on March 19, 2023, about the threat to life made against D.A. Bragg; Robertson's Truth Social account was banned, from March 21, 2023, onward he used a Facebook account for subsequent posts. On March 19, FBI agents conducted surveillance on Craig Robertson's home, observing him walk to his car and drive to a parking lot where he walked into a church meetinghouse. Later he walked back to his car and drove to another location before returning home, where the agents spoke to him outside the house. Robertson admitted to owning the social media account and told the agents, "I said it was a dream! We’re done here! Don’t return without a warrant!" On March 24 and subsequent days, Robertson posted threats against the agents including, "My 45ACP was ready to smoke 'em!!!":

TO MY FRIENDS IN THE FEDERAL BUREAU OF IDIOTS: I KNOW YOU'RE READING THIS AND YOU HAVE NO IDEA HOW CLOSE YOUR AGENTS CAME TO "VIOLENT ERADICATION"

— Craig Robertson

In July, Robertson allegedly wrote in a Facebook post, "Hey FBI, you still monitoring my social media? Checking so I can be sure to have a loaded gun handy in case you drop by again". On August 7, Robertson threatened the president on Facebook after learning that Biden was coming to Utah, according to court documents:

I HEAR BIDEN IS COMING TO UTAH.

DIGGING OUT MY OLD GHILLIE SUIT AND CLEANING THE DUST OFF THE M24 SNIPER RIFLE.

WELCOME, BUFFOON-IN-CHIEF!

— Craig Robertson

Robertson allegedly also wrote "Perhaps Utah will become famous this week as the place a sniper took out Biden the Marxist". On August 8, Robertson was charged with threatening the president of the United States and two other felony charges.

=== Attempted arrest and aftermath ===
On August 9 before 6:30 am local time, hours before the president landed in Utah and one day prior to him speaking at the George E. Wahlen VA Medical Center, FBI special agents attempted to serve an arrest warrant on Robertson at his home in Provo. Neighbors reportedly heard the agents identify themselves saying, "Craig Robertson, come out with your hands up! This is the FBI." several times on a vehicle loudspeaker, Robertson reportedly did not comply, saying, "I'm not coming out (expletive). [sic]" Agents were seen failing to breach an external door to Robertson's residence with a battering ram, and later successfully used a breaching vehicle to break through a street-facing window. Officers deployed a stun grenade outside in the driveway after the window had been breached and shouted "Craig, put your hands up." The neighbors heard a few rounds of gunfire and agents yelling, "shots fired, shots fired. He has a gun!" before a rapid barrage of gunfire; the New York Times and Associated Press have quoted at least two unnamed federal agents saying Robertson was armed. On August 14, 2023, an FBI press release alleged that Robertson pointed a .357 revolver at agents as they tried to take him into custody. Witnesses saw agents carry Robertson to the sidewalk where emergency medical personnel tried to resuscitate him. Robertson is believed to have died between 6:00 and 06:30 am local time. His body remained in the sidewalk until 8:30 am local time during forensic investigation.

Robertson's family made a public statement describing him as a firearm collector who was "understandably frustrated and distraught by the present and ongoing erosions to our constitutionally protected freedoms and the rights of free citizens".

== Personal life ==
Robertson was a member of The Church of Jesus Christ of Latter-day Saints, for whom he was a financial clerk in his ward for almost a decade. Ward member Travis Lee Clark, who had worked with Robertson at church as executive secretary and is an adjunct professor at Utah Valley University in Art History in the Department of Art and Design, told political commentator Glenn Beck in an interview he "had never heard [Robertson] say anything like that" in reference to the social media posts.

Robertson was a registered Republican and described himself as a "Maga Trumper." He was active on Facebook and the conservative social network Truth Social. He was reported to be a lifetime member of the National Rifle Association of America. A neighbor who went to church with him estimated he had at least 20 guns, though his social media posts indicate he had somewhere closer to a dozen.
