= Threatening government officials of the United States =

Felony crime in the United States

Threatening government officials is a felony in the United States; both physical threats and verbal threats are criminalized. Threatening the president is a separate felony. Cases will be investigated by the Federal Bureau of Investigation and the United States Secret Service. Threatening government officials and judges can count as terrorism and obstruction of justice. The specifics of what the threatener can be sentenced under depends on the specifics of the case. The frequency of threats and threats prosecuted follows the trend of national crises. Various social media platforms have been used to issue threats.

== Legality ==
In the United States, threatening government officials is a felony under federal law. Threatening the president of the United States is a felony under 18 U.S.C. § 871, punishable by up to 5 years of imprisonment, that is investigated by the United States Secret Service. Threatening other officials is a Class D or C felony, usually carrying maximum penalties of 5 or 10 years under 18 U.S.C. § 875, 18 U.S.C. § 876 and other statutes, that is investigated by the Federal Bureau of Investigation. When national boundaries are transcended by such a threat, it is considered a terrorist threat.

When a threat is made against a judge, it can be considered obstruction of justice. Threatening federal officials' family members is also a federal crime; in enacting the law, the Committee on the Judiciary stated that "Clearly it is a proper Federal function to respond to terrorists and other criminals who seek to influence the making of Federal policies and interfere with the administration of justice by attacking close relatives of those entrusted with these tasks."

There are three elements of the offense of making an illegal threat: (i) there must be a transmission in interstate commerce; (ii) there must be a communication containing the threat; (iii) and the threat must be a threat to injure the person of another. Threats can also sometimes be punished under the statutes criminalizing assaulting, resisting, or impeding certain United States Government officers or employees or assassinating, kidnapping, and assaulting government officials of the United States.

United States Sentencing Guidelines take a number of factors into consideration in determining the recommended penalty, including evidence of the person's intent to carry out the threat; disruption to the government function; and the possibility of inciting others to violence. There is also a 6-level official victim enhancement, which makes the recommended penalty, per the sentencing table, approximately double that which would apply if an ordinary citizen were the victim. There can be many motives for making threats, including political motives or a desire to frame someone else for making the threat. The person's intent can greatly affect the sentence.

In determining what constitutes a true threat, the courts hold that what must be proved is that a reasonable recipient of the communication would consider it a threat under the circumstances. Thus, a statement to a judge that "You and your family are going to die" would be regarded as a true threat, even if the defendant claimed that he meant it as a biological fact of life that everyone will die. If a threat is made to multiple individuals, it may be considered to be outside of the guidelines heartland, and therefore to warrant an enhancement.

== Incidents ==
=== Presidents ===
The Secret Service prefers not to publicize incidents of Presidential assassination threats, because it believes that it will generate more criminal behavior, especially among the mentally ill. Reports have circulated in the British press that Barack Obama received four times as many threats as his predecessor, a claim that Secret Service Director Mark Sullivan denies. Historically, prosecutions for presidential assassination threats have risen during periods of national crisis, such as the World Wars and the Vietnam War era. New communication technologies such as Facebook, MySpace, and Twitter have become vectors for investigated alleged threats against the President. After the 2016 Presidential election mashable.com reported 12,000 calls for President Donald Trump's assassination in Twitter.

=== Legislators ===
There have been comparatively few physical assaults on Members of Congress. On May 22, 1856, Senator Charles Sumner was savagely beaten down to the floor of the Senate chamber with a gold-knobbed cane by Representative Preston Brooks after Sumner delivered a fiery oration against slavery. In 1954, four Puerto Rican nationalists opened fire on the House chamber, wounding five Members of Congress. In 1978, Representative Leo Ryan was shot and killed in Jonestown, Guyana, becoming the only member of Congress to lose his life in the line of duty. Representative Gabby Giffords was shot and severely injured in January 2011 outside a supermarket where she met with constituents. Representative Steve Scalise was gravely wounded in 2017 when he was shot by a former volunteer for Bernie Sanders's 2016 Presidential campaign. Senator Rand Paul suffered several rib fractures and developed pneumonia after a November 2017 attack by a neighbor over a dispute over lawn care.

Threats and intimidation directed against Members of Congress are more common than physical assaults. A prominent example was the burning of a cross, an intimidation tactic of the Ku Klux Klan, on House Speaker Sam Rayburn's front lawn in Texas during debate on civil rights legislation in the 1960s. The United States Capitol Police investigates threats against Members of Congress and reports to the chair and Ranking Member of the Committee on House Administration and/or the United States Senate Committee on Rules and Administration.

Social media have been used to publish threats and intimidating messages. Threats have been made through YouTube videos and Twitter (which hosted direct threats of violence against Members of Congress such as Representative Bob Goodlatte, and Senators Roy Blunt and John Hoeven). Concern has been voiced in the press over Twitter's failure in some cases to promptly remove threats made against Members of Congress. Kyler Schmitz's threats to shoot Senator Roy Blunt remained on Twitter after Schmitz had been arrested for illegally using interstate communications to make the threat. Christopher Michael McGowan was arrested in April 2018 for a series of Tweets threatening Representative Goodlatte and other lawmakers made from January to April 2018. Twitter's stated policy on "Violent threats and glorification of violence" says "You may not make specific threats of violence or wish for the serious physical harm, death, or disease of an individual or group of people".

2010 legislation for health care reform in the United States saw an increased number of threatening communications and actions directed at legislators. Several Members of Congress received threatening messages. Representative Eric Cantor received a threat from Norman Leboon, a donor to Barack Obama who had produced more than 2,000 threatening YouTube videos; the Democratic Party said that it would donate the funds to charity. Other lawmakers' windows were broken with bricks and other objects.

House Minority Leader John Boehner stated, "Violence and threats are unacceptable. Yes, I know there is anger, but let's take that anger, and go out and register people to vote, go volunteer on a political campaign, and let's do it the right way." Rep. Cantor, who received a bullet through his campaign office window, stated, "Security threats against members of Congress are not a partisan issue, and they should never be treated that way. To use such threats as political weapons is reprehensible." He accused Representative Chris Van Hollen of "dangerously fanning the flames by suggesting that these incidents be used as a political weapon." A spokesman for the Southern Poverty Law Center remarked, "I think it is astounding that we are seeing this wave of vigilantism."

After the 2016 Presidential election, personal attacks gained a more prominent place in dialogue between the President and legislators from both major US parties, with at least one Member of Congress advocating harassment of other Federal officials outside of work. In June 2018, Representative Maxine Waters, speaking at an outdoor rally said, "If you see anybody from that (Trump) Cabinet in a restaurant, in a department store, at a gasoline station, you get out and you create a crowd and you push back on them, and you tell them they're not welcome anymore, anywhere."

In July 2018, Senate Majority Leader Mitch McConnell was confronted with shouted personal insults and the threat "we know where you live" by a crowd of protesters; earlier, McConnell and his wife Elaine Chao were subjected to verbal abuse by a crowd as they left an event at Georgetown University. According to National Public Radio, at least three Trump administration officials — Secretary of Homeland Security Kirstjen Nielsen, Trump adviser Stephen Miller and White House Press Secretary Sarah Huckabee Sanders, along with her family — have been forced out by vocal protesters from restaurants or denied service.

Senate Minority Leader Charles Schumer and House Minority Leader Nancy Pelosi denounced the tactic of harassing their political enemies. Both Schumer and Pelosi referred to President Trump's personal attacks on political opponents on Twitter while disavowing the tactics of Rep. Maxine Waters.

During Senate confirmation hearings on Brett Kavanaugh's appointment to the US Supreme Court, Senator Ted Cruz's Houston campaign office received an envelope containing white powder just after two envelopes containing the poison ricin were mailed to US Secretary of Defense James Mattis and the Chief of Naval Operations. Sen. Cruz and his wife also had to leave their table at a Washington restaurant when protesters shouted them down at their table.

According to Newsweek, Senator Susan Collins's office received "threatening, profanity-laced phone calls and letters, telling her to vote against the confirmation of Brett Kavanaugh to the Supreme Court". One caller told a young woman working for Collins that he hoped she would be raped and impregnated, according to a voicemail provided to the New York Times by Collins's spokeswoman.

In 2020, Twitter announced that any posts wishing for Trump's death from coronavirus would be removed for violating the platform's terms of service. Democratic congresswomen Rashida Tlaib, Alexandria Ocasio-Cortez, Ilhan Omar, and Ayanna Pressley criticized Twitter for not taking threats against them seriously, pointing out posts calling for their deaths that had been allowed to remain on the site.

Doxing of legislators also occurs. Jackson A. Cosko, a member of Representative Sheila Jackson Lee's staff, was arrested by US Capitol Police in October 2018, charged with public restricted information, unauthorized access of a government computer, burglary, threatening Federal officials and other crimes. According to a Federal arrest warrant filed by Capitol Police, Cosko threatened an aide of Senator Maggie Hassan who found him using a computer in Sen. Hassan's office, then ordered him to leave in a email. Cosko posted confidential personal information such as home and office addresses and home telephone numbers of five US senators, including Senate Judiciary Committee members Lindsey Graham, Mike Lee and Orrin Hatch, to their Wikipedia articles. In April 2019 Cosko pleaded guilty to two counts of Making Public Restricted Personal Information, one count of Computer Fraud, one count of Witness Tampering, and one count of Obstruction of Justice, in exchange for an agreement by the prosecutors to drop other applicable charges. On June 19, 2019, Cosko was sentenced to 4 years in Federal prison.

Craig Deleeuw Robertson threatened to assassinate Joe Biden, Gavin Newsom, and Manhattan D.A. Alvin Bragg.

Cyberstalking of legislators is a related problem. Juan McCullum, a former member of Congressional delegate Stacey Plaskett and Representative Frederica Wilson's staffs was charged in July 2017 with illegally obtaining private nude photographs of Delegate Plaskett and videos of her family from Ms. Plaskett's iPhone while he worked for her, then using an Internet account under an assumed name to distribute the photos and encourage other Internet users to share them online.

=== Judges and prosecutors ===
Threats against federal judges can include threats of vigilantism. For instance, in 2004, gun-rights activist, Denver businessman and former Libertarian candidate for U.S. Senate Rick Stanley was sentenced to six years of imprisonment for sending two judges, Thornton Municipal Judge Charles J. Rose and 17th Judicial District Judge Donald W. Marshall, Jr., a "notice of order" demanding that they reverse his conviction for a weapons violation or face arrest by Stanley's Mutual Defense Pact Militia and a trial for treason. Stanley was also ordered to pay $8,250 restitution to police who worked overtime to protect the judges.

Threats against federal judges and prosecutors have more than doubled in recent years, with threats against federal prosecutors rising from 116 to 250 from 2003 to 2008, and threats against federal judges climbing from 500 to 1,278 in that same period, prompting hundreds to get 24-hour protection from armed U.S. marshals. The problem has become so pronounced that a threat management center has been opened in Crystal City, Virginia, where a staff of about 25 marshals and analysts monitor a 24-hour number for reporting threats, use sophisticated mapping software to track those being threatened and tap into a classified database linked to the FBI and CIA. In 2009, a radio host was indicted for, after criticizing three appellate judges of the United States Court of Appeals for the Seventh Circuit who affirmed a lower court decision to dismiss challenges to Chicago's handgun ban as "cunning, ruthless, untrustworthy, disloyal, unpatriotic, deceitful scum", allegedly saying, "Let me be the first to say this plainly: These judges deserve to be killed." He also allegedly posted blog entries providing a photo and a map of the Dirksen Federal Building in Chicago, where the court is located, with arrows pointing to "anti-truck bomb barriers." That case resulted in two hung juries. The sending of white powder as part of a threatening communication has become common since the 2001 anthrax attacks.

The making of these threats coincided with high-profile violence against federal officials in that same period, including Baltimore Assistant U.S. Attorney Jonathan Luna, who was stabbed 36 times with his own penknife and drowned in a creek, and Thomas C. Wales, an assistant U.S. attorney in Seattle gunned down at his home. Such incidents lead U.S. officials to take threats seriously. However, actual attacks on government officials are still rare in the U.S. relative to many countries with more unstable governments (e.g. so-called "banana republics" that frequently experience coups and assassinations) as evidenced by the fact that the most famous judge to be assassinated in recent times was John H. Wood, Jr. back in 1979.

Case law records that many threats are made by prisoners dissatisfied with the handling of their own case or fellow inmates', or wanting to serve time in the federal system. Often the penalties for making the threat are more serious than those imposed for the original offense. Threats by inmates are taken seriously if the person has contacts on the outside who are capable of carrying out the threat. Federal officials attribute the rising threat rate to disgruntled defendants, terrorism and gang cases that bring more violent offenders into federal courts, frustration over the economic crisis and the rise of the "sovereign citizen" movement – a loose collection of tax protesters, white supremacists and others who don't respect federal authority.

Social media has become notable in threats against high-profile Federal judges. Several threats or encouragements of others to kill United States Court of Appeals for the District of Columbia Circuit judge Brett Kavanaugh or members of the Senate who supported confirmation of his appointment to the US Supreme Court were made on Twitter. Twitter formally forbids users to "make specific threats of violence or wish for the serious physical harm, death, or disease of an individual or group of people".

=== Other civil servants ===
The Internal Revenue Service is frequently a target of threats. Examples include the case of U.S. v. Darby, in which the defendant told the IRS he was tired of their bullshit, asked how they would like to have a pipe bomb delivered to their place of employment, and said that he didn't eat his victims like Jeffrey Dahmer but just killed them by blowing them up; David J. D'Addabbo, who sent a petition to IRS workers warning that they would be "tried by a jury and your penalty will be sought for it to be death by firing squad" and told the arresting agents to "watch your back"; and John Barker, who perpetrated an anthrax hoax against the IRS. According to the U.S. Treasury Department's Inspector General for Tax Administration, threats against the IRS have been rising in recent years, and in 2009 rose from 834 to 1,014 per year, an increase of 21.5% over the prior year. There have been incidents of actual violence against the IRS to take place as well, by people ramming cars into IRS offices, setting them on fire, and taking out hits on IRS employees, although the 2010 Austin plane crash was one of the more high-profile incidents. According to a Cato Institute commentator, "this trend is likely to continue until there is a fundamental change in our tax laws and collection methods. People who do not have access to the media and cannot afford expensive tax lawyers sometimes reach such a level of frustration with the IRS that they resort to violent or irrational behavior." There is a special statute, 26 U.S.C. § 7212, that protects IRS employees from threats, which according to the U.S. Attorneys' Manual, "provides a particularly helpful alternative in cases where there is simply an offer of violence unaccompanied by the potential for imminent use of physical force."

Federal law enforcement agencies are often the target of threats. Examples include Jeff Henry Williamson, who threatened to blow up FBI headquarters, CIA headquarters and the Justice Department; and Micha Godfrey, who allegedly emailed medical cannabis websites threats against DEA agents and their families, and a search of whose house subsequently turned up four firearms, a bulletproof vest, and cannabis plants. Government agencies are sometimes the subject of blackmail attempts, as when an informer threatened to falsely accuse the FBI of knowing in advance that the World Trade Center would be bombed and of failing to stop it.

Doxing is also used against law enforcement officers. During the controversy over full enforcement of immigration laws in the United States in June 2018, the activist Web site WikiLeaks published the identities of over 9,000 alleged current and former employees of U.S. Immigration and Customs Enforcement gleaned from the LinkedIn Web site, with their places of employment and contact information.

== Enforcement ==
When the FBI receives threats over the Internet, it can use National Security Letters to obtain the real name, street address and Internet logs of the sender, and those who provide the information were forbidden by the PATRIOT Act from revealing the request to anyone, until the Doe v. Ashcroft case overturned that gag rule. According to the federal investigators, political protesters who threaten elected officials or turn violent are easier for law enforcement officials to track due to their vocal and high-profile statements on the internet. For instance, Nigel Coleman posted the address of Rep. Tom Perriello online and invited people to "visit" the official at his home. The address was actually Perriello's brother Bo. A severed gas line at the home was discovered one day after the address was made public.

== See also ==
- Disposition Matrix
- Domestic terrorism in the United States
- Stalking
- Terrorism
