= Terroristic threat =

Threat to commit violent crime or cause bodily injury

A terroristic threat is a threat to commit a crime of violence or a threat to cause bodily injury to another person and terrorization as the result of the proscribed conduct. Several U.S. states have enacted statutes which impose criminal liability for "terroristic threatening" or "making a terroristic threat."

== Overview ==
Generally, a terroristic threat "is sufficiently specific where it threatens death or great bodily injury, and a threat is not insufficient simply because it does not communicate a time or precise manner of execution. Thus, a criminal statute prohibiting terroristic threatening serves to criminalize future, as well as present, death threats."

Courts have held that "a threat need not take any particular form or be expressed in any particular words, and may be made by innuendo or suggestion, and that the words uttered will not be considered in a vacuum but rather in light of all the circumstances." A number of courts have upheld convictions under a state criminal terroristic threat statute on the basis of a single or solitary threat, a conditional threat, or a threat that some third person will take action. In several states, courts have held that a "threatener's present inability to carry out his or her threats does not in itself remove the threats from the purview of terroristic threat or terroristic threatening statutes." However, "the courts recognized that one does not violate a terroristic threat or terroristic threatening statute by making idle talk or jests which do not have a reasonable tendency to create apprehension that the speaker will act according to the threat."

The threat need not be communicated in person, but may be made by any means; courts have in a number of cases held that a terroristic threat statute may be violated by a threat made by telephone, by letter by communication with a third party, or by "a nonverbal, symbolic threat which in other respects satisfies the criminal elements specified in the terroristic threat statute" (such as the burning of a cross on the target's driveway).

The required mens rea element of the offense is generally "that the accused have made the threat with the intent or purpose of causing fear in the victim or in reckless disregard of the risk of causing such fear." At least one court has specified that the "proof of a terroristic threat is measured by an objective standard."

American Law Reports indicates that "the cases are in disagreement over the availability of voluntary intoxication as a defense in a terroristic threat or terroristic threatening prosecution, with intoxication being a defense where a specific criminal intent is an essential element of the offense, but not a defense where the offense is established without specific criminal intent."

Terroristic-threat statutes have generally been upheld by the courts against constitutional challenges raising claims that such laws violate the Free Speech Clause, are impermissibly vague, or overlap with a criminal assault statute.

== Example statutes ==
=== Model Penal Code ===
In the Model Penal Code, terroristic threats are defined as assault related crimes. Under the MPC "a person is guilty of a felony of the third degree if he threatens to commit any crime of violence with purpose to terrorize another or to cause evacuation of a building, place of assembly, or facility of public transportation, or otherwise to cause serious public inconvenience, or in reckless disregard of the risk of causing such terror or inconvenience."

=== California ===
"Under California law, the elements of the completed crime of making threats with intent to terrorize are: (1) willfully threatening to commit a crime that will result in death or great bodily injury to another person, (2) specific intent that the statement be taken as a threat, (3) the threat was on its face and under the circumstances so unequivocal, unconditional, immediate, and specific as to convey to the person threatened a gravity of purpose and an immediate prospect of execution of the threat, (4) the threat caused the victim to be in sustained fear for his or her own safety or for his or her immediate family's safety, and (5) the victim's fear was reasonable under the circumstances."

=== Texas ===
In Texas, terroristic threats are prohibited under Chapter 22 of the Texas Penal Code:

Sec. 22.07. TERRORISTIC THREAT. (a) A person commits an offense if he threatens to commit any offense involving violence to any person or property with intent to:

(1) cause a reaction of any type to his threat by an official or volunteer agency organized to deal with emergencies;
(2) place any person in fear of imminent serious bodily injury;
(3) prevent or interrupt the occupation or use of a building, room, place of assembly, place to which the public has access, place of employment or occupation, aircraft, automobile, or other form of conveyance, or other public place;
(4) cause impairment or interruption of public communications, public transportation, public water, gas, or power supply or other public service;
(5) place the public or a substantial group of the public in fear of serious bodily injury; or
(6) influence the conduct or activities of a branch or agency of the federal government, the state, or a political subdivision of the state.

=== United States ===
18 U.S.C. § 2332b(c)(1)(g) makes it a class C felony, punishable by 3 years imprisonment, for someone to willfully threaten to commit a crime that will result in death or great bodily harm; the threat is made with the specific intent that it be taken as a threat; the threat is so unequivocal, unconditional, and specific as to convey a gravity of purpose and immediate prospect of execution; the threat actually causes fear in the victim; and the fear is reasonable.

== See also ==
- Bomb threat
- Counterterrorism
- Death threat
- Harassment
- Incitement to terrorism
- Stalking
- Terrorism
- True threat
