= Garda Information Message =

An Irish police warning issued by Gardí

A Garda Information Message - also known as a GIM form or a GIM1 form is a green official written warning issued by Gardaí, the Irish police service, to let people know of a threat to their life. They have to be delivered by hand, accompanied by a leaflet advising how to take basic security measures.

== See also ==
- Osman notice, a similar notice in the UK
