= Crime Victims Fund =

The United States Crime Victims Fund, administered by the Office for Victims of Crime, is used to recompense victims of offenses against U.S. law. The fund was established as part of the 1984 Victims of Crimes Act. The special assessment on convicted persons is paid into this fund, as are certain other criminal fines and penalties, and forfeited bail bonds. As of September 2013, the unspent balance of the fund was almost $9 billion. Each state is entitled to disburse funds for a multitude of different reasons such as compensation for pain and suffering, property replacement, money for loss of wages, property restoration and or cleaning of the crime scene. Office of Victim Services (OVS) helps victims in a number of ways as a family member, or friend cope with victimization from a crime. OVS can point victims to other service providers who may also be able to assist them. The National Crime Scene Cleanup Association (NCSCA) performs all clean crime scene cleaning for this fund at no charge to the victim or family.
