= Federal parole in the United States =

Federal parole in the United States is a system that is implemented by the United States Parole Commission. Persons eligible for federal parole include persons convicted under civilian federal law of offenses which were committed on or before November 1, 1987, persons convicted under District of Columbia law for offenses committed before August 5, 2000, "transfer treaty" inmates, persons who violated military law who are in federal civilian prisons, and persons who are defendants in state cases and who are under the U.S. Marshals Service Witness Protection Program.

In general, federally sentenced inmates were eligible to participate prior to the Sentencing Reform Act of 1984. Parole of federal prisoners began after enactment of legislation on June 25, 1910. Under parole, prisoners were eligible for release before their sentences were complete. Parole boards under the United States Parole Commission determines whether a prisoner should be released and whether or not a parolee who violated parole should be sent back to prison. For persons convicted under civilian federal law after November 1, 1987, federal parole has been abolished, but the parole statutes continue to apply to prisoners who were grandfathered in.

== See also ==
- United States federal probation and supervised release
