= Intermittent confinement =

Intermittent detention of persons found guilty of crimes

In the United States and Canada, intermittent confinement or weekend jail is an alternative sentence in which a defendant is required to report to a correctional facility for multiple short periods of incarceration, usually during the weekend. This type of sentence allows a defendant to maintain employment and family relationships while completing a sentence.

The majority of defendants are usually sentenced to intermittent confinement for minor offenses, but occasionally persons convicted of more serious crimes, such as sex offenses, may be allowed to serve an intermittent confinement sentence. Intermittent confinement is used at both the state and federal levels in the United States. Canada imposes a ninety-day limit on sentences permitted to be served as intermittent confinement while the U.S. has no federally imposed restriction on the maximum amount of time a person may be sentenced to and still allowed to serve his or her sentence as intermittent confinement.

== Implementation ==
The exact conditions and implementation of intermittent confinement vary from jurisdiction to jurisdiction.

Intermittent confinement may take place in a pay-to-stay correctional facility offering more comfortable and safer accommodations than a usual correctional facility. This practice is common in Southern California, and generates revenue for smaller municipalities in the area.

But people sentenced to intermittent confinement are also held in facilities without enhanced accommodations that primarily function as regular correctional facilities. For example, weekend inmates in Virginia Beach Jail are held separately from the general population of the jail but in the same facility. Intermittent Confinement can consist of community service work or other labor under supervision, as opposed to being confined within a correctional facility.

Persons serving federal intermittent confinement sentences in the United States are generally held in a federal prison.

== Controversy ==
Intermittent confinement has been the subject of controversy. It has been criticized because it is viewed as a less severe punishment compared to a continuous sentence, especially in cases of violent or sex offenses. Others argue that, by allowing persons to continue working during the week, restitution is more likely to be paid to victims of crimes. In Canada, intermittent confinement has been subject to concerns about overcrowding.
