= Legislative intent =

Intention of a law passed by a legislature

In law, the legislative intent of the legislature in enacting legislation may sometimes be considered by the judiciary to interpret the law (see judicial interpretation). The judiciary may attempt to assess legislative intent where legislation is ambiguous or does not appear to directly, adequately address a particular issue, or appears to have been a legislative drafting error.

The courts have repeatedly held that when a statute is clear and unambiguous, the inquiry into legislative intent ends at that point. It is only when a statute could be interpreted in more than one fashion that legislative intent must be inferred from sources other than the actual text of the statute.

== Sources ==
Courts frequently look at the following sources in attempting to determine the goals and purposes that the legislative body had in mind when it passed the law:

- the text of the bill as proposed to the legislative body
- amendments to the bill that were proposed and accepted or rejected
- the record of hearings on the topic
- legislative records or journals
- speeches and floor debate made prior to the vote on the bill
- legislative subcommittee minutes, factual findings, and reports
- other relevant statutes that can be used to understand the definitions in the statute in question
- other relevant statutes which indicate the limits of the statute in question
- legislative files of the executive branch, such as the governor or president
- case law prior to the statute or following it that demonstrates the problems the legislature attempted to address by the bill
- constitutional determinations (would a certain section of a statute had been passed if it had had known about the constitutional invalidity of the other portions of the statute?)
- legislative intent (the reason for passing the law)

== Application ==
Courts in the United States and elsewhere have developed a number of principles for handling such evidence of legislative intent. For example, many courts have suggested that the comments of those opposing a bill under consideration should be treated with skepticism on the principle that opponents of a bill may often exaggerate its practical consequences.

One early example of an important US Supreme Court case that relied on legislative intent was Johnson v. Southern Pacific Co. (1904) 196 U.S. 1. The Court decided that a man may sue the railroad for failing to have an automatic coupler since the legislature had attempted to remedy the problem of multiple injuries by railroad coupling.

Others, most notably United States Supreme Court Justice Antonin Scalia, have objected generally to the use of such evidence, rather than reliance on the literal language of the statute. They argue that such evidence of "legislative intent" is often created by proponents of a bill to persuade a court to interpret the statute in a way that they had failed to persuade the legislative body to adopt when they passed the bill.

Those principles of legislative intent often overlap with those principles of statutory construction that courts have developed to interpret ambiguous or incomplete legislation. For example, the principle that courts should not interpret a statute to produce absurd or unintended results (the golden rule principle) is often informed by evidence of what the proponents of a bill stated on the objectives to be achieved by the statute.

== See also ==
- Judicial activism
- Statutory interpretation
- Legislative history
