= Relevant conduct =

Relevant conduct is an important concept in the U.S. Sentencing Guidelines. According to the U.S. Court of Appeals for the 2nd Circuit, relevant conduct is "almost a term of art as a result of its detailed exposition in Sections 1B1.3 (Relevant Conduct), 4 (Criminal History); and 3D1.2(d) (Drug Trafficking)." The U.S. Sentencing Commission notes, "Deemed the 'cornerstone' of the federal sentencing guidelines, relevant conduct defines the scope of behavior that must be considered in every federal case."
