= Classes of offenses under United States federal law =

Offenses under United States federal law are grouped into different classes according to the maximum term of imprisonment defined within the statute for the offense. The classes of offenses under United States federal law are as follows:

Offense classes
Type	Class	Maximum prison term	Maximum fine (Note: The maximum fine for misdemeanors is increased to $250,000 if the offense resulted in death; the maximum fine is doubled if the offender is an organization, as opposed to an individual.)	Probation term (Note: Probation is imposed as a substitute for imprisonment.)	Maximum supervised release term (Note: Supervised release is imposed in addition to imprisonment.)	Maximum prison term upon supervised release revocation	Special assessment (Note: The special assessment is quadrupled in value for felonies and quintupled in value for misdemeanors if the offender is a person other than an individual.)
Felony	A	Life imprisonment (or death in certain cases of murder, treason, espionage or mass trafficking of drugs)	$250,000	1-5 years	5 years	5 years	$100
Felony	B	25 years or more	$250,000	1-5 years	5 years	3 years	$100
Felony	C	More than 10 years and less than 25 years	$250,000	1-5 years	3 years	2 years	$100
Felony	D	More than 5 years and less than 10 years	$250,000	1-5 years	3 years	2 years	$100
Felony	E	More than 1 year and less than 5 years	$250,000	1-5 years	1 year	1 year	$100
Misdemeanor	A	More than 6 months and less than 1 year	$100,000	0-5 years	1 year	1 year	$25
Misdemeanor	B	More than 30 days and less than 6 months	$5,000	0-5 years	1 year	1 year	$10
Misdemeanor	C	More than 5 days and less than 30 days	$5,000	0-5 years	1 year	1 year	$5
Infraction	N/A	5 days or less	$5,000	0-1 years	N/A	N/A	N/A

== See also ==
- Special assessment on convicted persons
- Supervised release
- Probation and supervised release under United States federal law
