= Threatening the president of the United States =

Crime in the United States

Threatening the president of the United States is a federal felony under United States Code Title 18, Section 871. It consists of knowingly and willfully mailing or otherwise making "any threat to take the life of, to kidnap, or to inflict bodily harm upon the president of the United States". The law also includes presidential candidates, vice presidents, and former presidents. The Secret Service investigates suspected violations of this law and monitors those who have a history of threatening the president. Threatening the president is considered a political offense. Immigrants who commit this crime can be deported.

Because the offense consists of pure speech, the courts have issued rulings attempting to balance the government's interest in protecting the president with free speech rights under the First Amendment. According to the book Stalking, Threatening, and Attacking Public Figures, "Hundreds of celebrity howlers threaten the president of the United States every year, sometimes because they disagree with his policies, but more often just because he is the president."

== Frequency ==
The first prosecutions under the statute, enacted in 1917, occurred during the highly charged, hyperpatriotic years of World War I, and the decisions handed down by the courts in these early cases reflected intolerance for any words demonstrating even a vague spirit of disloyalty. There was a relative moratorium on prosecutions under this statute until the World War II era. The number increased during the turbulent Vietnam War era. They have tended to fall when the country has not been directly embroiled in a national crisis situation.

The number of reported threats rose from 2,400 in 1965 to 12,800 in 1969. According to Ronald Kessler, President George W. Bush received about 3,000 threats a year, while his successor Barack Obama received about four times that amount. This figure has been disputed by Secret Service director Mark Sullivan, who says that Obama received about as many threats as the previous two presidents.

According to the U.S. Attorneys' Manual, "Media attention given to certain kinds of criminal activity seems to generate further criminal activity; this is especially true concerning presidential threats which is well documented by data previously supplied by the United States Secret Service. For example, in the six-month period following the March 30, 1981, attempt on the life of President Reagan, the average number of threats against protectees of the Secret Service increased by over 150 percent from a similar period during the prior year." For this reason, the agency recommends considering the use of sealed affidavits to keep news of threats from leaking to the press.

== Incidents ==
Convictions under 18 U.S.C. § 871 have been sustained for declaring that "President Wilson ought to be killed. It is a wonder some one has not done it already. If I had an opportunity, I would do it myself"; and for declaring that "Wilson is a wooden-headed son of a bitch. I wish Wilson was in hell, and if I had the power I would put him there." In a later era, a conviction was sustained for displaying posters urging passersby to "hang [President Franklin D.] Roosevelt".

In 1935, 52-year-old Austin Phelps Palmer, a mechanical engineer, wrote two letters to President Roosevelt, blaming him for the loss of his $1 million fortune. In one letter, he wrote, "Franklin Delano Roosevelt, Communist and destroyer of private business. I warn you, if you destroy my business I will strangle you with my own hands. May your soul be exterminated in hell." Months later, newspapers reported that a dumbfounded Palmer was arrested after federal agents, who'd spent months tracking him down, showed up at the doorstep of his luxury apartment. His servant accompanied him to his arraignment, where he was charged with sending threatening letters to the President. Palmer pleaded guilty and was sentenced to 90 days in jail.

A number of Nazi sympathizers were prosecuted for threatening Roosevelt. In 1940, Edward De Roulhac Blount was arrested for saying he would kill the president at the first opportunity he got. He pleaded guilty to two counts of threatening the president and was sentenced to two to six years in prison. Federal prosecutors found two birthday greetings to Adolf Hitler on Blount's yacht. In 1943, William Thomas Reid, a known Nazi sympathizer, was arrested for telling an associate in the oil business, "President Roosevelt is one guy I hate. If I had the money, I would go to Washington and kill the president and if he ever comes south I will." Reid was convicted and sentenced to 18 months in prison.

In a 1971 interview, comedian Groucho Marx told Flash magazine, "I think the only hope this country has is Nixon's assassination." U.S. Attorney James L. Browning Jr. opined, "It is one thing to say that 'I (or we) will kill Richard Nixon' when you are the leader of an organization which advocates killing people and overthrowing the Government; it is quite another to utter the words which are attributed to Mr. Marx, an alleged comedian."

This cartoon by Michael Ramirez led to his questioning by the Secret Service.

In July 2003, the Los Angeles Times published a Sunday editorial cartoon by Michael Ramirez that depicted a man pointing a gun at President Bush's head; it was a takeoff on the 1969 Pulitzer Prize-winning photo by Eddie Adams that showed South Vietnamese National Police Chief Nguyễn Ngọc Loan executing a Viet Cong prisoner (Capt. Nguyễn Văn Lém) at point-blank range. The cartoon prompted a visit from the Secret Service, but no charges were filed.

In 2005, a teacher instructed her senior civics and economics class to take photographs to illustrate the rights contained in the Bill of Rights. One student "had taken a photo of George Bush out of a magazine and tacked the picture to a wall with a red thumb tack through his head. Then he made a thumb's-down sign with his own hand next to the president's picture, and he had a photo taken of that, and he pasted it on a poster." A Wal-Mart photo department employee reported it to police, and the Secret Service investigated. No charges were filed.

In 2007, Purdue University teaching assistant Vikram Buddhi was convicted of posting messages to Yahoo Finance criticizing the Iraq War and stating, "Call for the assassination of GW Bush" and "Rape and Kill Laura Bush". The defense had argued that the defendant never explicitly threatened anyone. He was imprisoned for 4 years and 9 months, and deported to India upon his release.

In September 2009 the Secret Service investigated Facebook polls that asked whether President Barack Obama should be assassinated. Some question has arisen as to how to handle Facebook groups such as "LETS KILL BUSH WITH SHOES" (a reference to the 2008 Muntadhar al-Zaidi shoe incident) which had 484 members as of September 2009; similar issues have arisen on MySpace. Tweets have come under Secret Service investigation, including ones that said "ASSASSINATION! America, we survived the Assassinations of Lincoln & Kennedy. We'll surely get over a bullet to Barrack [sic] Obama's head," and "The next American with a Clear Shot should drop Obama like a bad habit. 4get Blacks or his claims to b[e] Black. Turn on Barack Obama."

In 2010, Johnny Logan Spencer Jr. was sentenced in Louisville, Kentucky, to 33 months in prison for posting a poem entitled "The Sniper" about the president's assassination on a white supremacist website. He apologized in court, saying that he was, as WHAS news put it, "upset about his mother's death and had fallen in with a white supremacist group that had helped him kick a drug habit."

In 2010, Brian Dean Miller was sentenced in Texas to 27 months in prison for posting to Craigslist: "People, the time has come for revolution. It is time for Obama to die. I am dedicating my life to the death of Obama and every employee of the federal government. As I promised in a previous post, if the health care reform bill passed I would become a terrorist. Today I become a terrorist."

Later in 2010, Michael Stephen Bowden, who said that President Obama was not doing enough to help African Americans, was arrested after making murder-suicide threats against Obama.

On July 19, 2011, the 9th Circuit U.S. Court of Appeals reversed the conviction of Walter Bagdasarian for making online threats against Obama. The court found that his speech urging Obama's assassination ("Re: Obama fk the niggar [sic], he will have a 50 cal in the head soon" and "shoot the nig country fkd for another 4 years+, what nig has done ANYTHING right???? long term???? never in history, except sambos") was protected by the First Amendment.

In 2017, Stephen Taubert, a 59-year-old Air Force veteran and resident of Syracuse, New York, called the office of Senator Al Franken and, in a rant full of racial slurs, said he was going to "hang" former President Barack Obama. On April 29, 2019, United States District Court Judge Glenn T. Suddaby sentenced him to federal prison for 46 months for that crime and for making threats against the life of Congresswoman Maxine Waters and her staff. His sentence came six weeks after a jury found him guilty of threatening to kill a former United States president, transmitting a threat in interstate commerce and making a threat to influence, impede or retaliate against a federal official. At his sentencing, Taubert said "I'm sorry for the offensive language. That's all it was. It does get me upset when I listen to the news and they attack [President Donald Trump]. He's a good person and he's done a lot for this country and the veterans." After his sentencing, Grant C. Jaquith, the United States attorney for the Northern District of New York, said in a statement, "Racist threats to kill present and former public officials are not protected free speech, but serious crimes."

In October 2020, Twitter announced that posts wishing for the death of President Trump from COVID-19 would be removed for violating the platform's terms of service. Democratic congresswomen Rashida Tlaib, Alexandria Ocasio-Cortez, Ilhan Omar, and Ayanna Pressley criticized the company for not taking similar threats against them seriously.

In August 2023, firearms collector and former welding inspector Craig Robertson threatened to assassinate President Joe Biden and the Manhattan D.A. in multiple posts made on Facebook. He was killed while a search warrant was being served by FBI agents on his home.

== History ==
The prototype for Section 871 was the British Treason Act 1351 (25 Edw. 3. Stat. 5. c. 2), which made it a crime to "compass or imagine" the death of the king. The statute prohibiting threats against the president was enacted by Congress in 1917. The maximum fine it allowed was $1,000. The law was amended in 1994 to increase the maximum fine to $250,000. Additionally, a 1982 law extended Section 871 to cover former presidents and candidates of major parties by adding Section 879 to Title 18 of the United States Code.

Among the justifications that have been given for the statute include arguments that threats against the president have a tendency to stimulate opposition to national policies, however wise, even in the most critical times; to incite the hostile and evil-minded to take the president's life; to add to the expense of the president's safeguarding; to be an affront to all loyal and right-thinking persons; to inflame their minds; to provoke resentment, disorder, and violence; and to disrupt presidential activity and movement. It has also been argued that such threats are akin to treason and can be rightly denounced as a crime against the people as the sovereign power. Congressman Edwin Y. Webb noted, "That is one reason why we want this statute – in order to decrease the possibility of actual assault by punishing threats to commit an assault ... A bad man can make a public threat, and put somebody else up to committing a crime against the Chief Executive, and that is where the harm comes. The man who makes the threat is not himself very dangerous, but he is liable to put devilment in the mind of some poor fellow who does try to harm him."

Prisoners are sometimes charged for threatening the president though they lack the ability to personally carry out such a threat. The courts have upheld such convictions, reasoning that actual ability to carry out the threat is not an element of the offense; prisoners are able to make true threats as they could carry out the threat by directing people on the outside to harm the president. Sometimes prisoners make such threats to manipulate the system; e.g., a case arose in which an inmate claiming to be "institutionalized" threatened the president in order to stay in prison; there was also a case in which a state prisoner threatened the president because he wanted to go to a federal institution.

== Penalties ==
Threatening the president of the United States is a class D felony under United States Code Title 18, Section 871. It is punishable by up to 5 years in prison, a maximum fine of $250,000, a $100 special assessment, and up to 3 years of supervised release. Internet restrictions such as a prohibition on access to email have been imposed on offenders who made their threats by computer. The U.S. Sentencing Guidelines set a base offense level of 12 for sending threatening communication, but when a threat to the president is involved, a 6-level "official victim" enhancement applies. Moreover, "an upward departure may be warranted due to the potential disruption of the governmental function." Further enhancements can apply if the offender evidenced an intent to carry out the threat (6-level enhancement); made more than two threats (2-level enhancement); caused substantial disruption of public, governmental, or business functions or services (4-level enhancement); or created a substantial risk of inciting others to harm federal officials (2-level enhancement). Since each 6-level increase approximately doubles the Guidelines sentencing range, it is not particularly rare for an offender who threatens the president to receive a sentence at or near the statutory maximum, especially if they have a criminal history, does not qualify for a reduction for acceptance of responsibility, or both. There is a 4-level decrease available for a threat involving a "single instance evidencing little or no deliberation", which would usually apply to spur-of-the-moment verbal threats. The maximum penalty for threatening a United States judge or a Federal law enforcement officer is 10 years imprisonment — double the maximum penalty for threatening the president.

== Interpretation ==
There has been some controversy among the federal appellate courts as to how the term "willfully" should be interpreted. Traditional legal interpretations of the term are reflected by Black's Law Dictionary's definition, which includes descriptions such as "malicious, done with evil intent, or with a bad motive or purpose." In U.S. v. Patillo, the U.S. Court of Appeals for the Fourth Circuit held that a threat to the president could lead to a verdict of guilty "only if made with the present intention to do injury to the president". Specifically, the court opined that "The word [willfully] often denotes an act which is intentional, or knowing, or voluntary, as distinguished from accidental. But when used in a criminal statute it generally means an act done with a bad purpose...We believe that a 'bad purpose' assumes even more than its usual importance in a criminal prosecution based upon the bare utterance of words."

Most of the other circuits have held that it is not necessary that the threat be intended to be communicated to the president or that it have tendency to influence his action. The legislative history, which contains debate over a rejected amendment that would have eliminated the words "knowingly and willfully" from the statute, reflects that the word "willfully" was included in order to avoid criminalizing behavior carried out with innocent intent (e.g. mailing to a friend, for informational purposes, a newspaper article containing a threat to the president). The U.S. Court of Appeals for the Seventh Circuit held that a threat was knowingly made if the maker comprehended the meaning of the words uttered by him. It was willingly made, if in addition to comprehending the meaning of his words, the maker voluntarily and intentionally uttered them as a declaration of apparent determination to carry them into execution.

=== Watts v. United States ===
In the case of Watts v. United States 394 U.S. 705 (1969), the United States Supreme Court ruled that mere political hyperbole must be distinguished from true threats. At a DuBois Club public rally on the Washington Monument grounds, a member of the assembled group suggested that the young people present should receive more education before expressing their views. The accused, an 18-year-old man, replied:

They always holler at us to get an education. And now I have already received my draft classification as 1-A and I have got to report for my physical this Monday coming. I am not going. If they ever make me carry a rifle the first man I want to get in my sights is L. B. J.

According to court testimony, the accused also made a gesture simulating a gunman peering down the barrel of a rifle. The audience responded with laughter and applause, which the Court of Appeals would later view as potentially ominous:

[I]t has not been unknown for laughter and applause to have sinister implications for the safety of others. History records that applause and laughter frequently greeted Hitler's predictions of the future of the German Jews. Even earlier, the Roman holidays celebrated in the Colosseum often were punctuated by cheers and laughter when the Emperor gestured thumbs down on a fallen gladiator.

Watts was arrested and found to be in possession of cannabis, but a Court of General Sessions judge suppressed the cannabis evidence because there had been no probable cause for the Secret Service agents to believe the defendant's words constituted a threat to the president. This did not prevent a federal court from convicting him for threatening the president. The United States Court of Appeals for the District of Columbia Circuit affirmed his conviction, but the Supreme Court reversed, stating, "We agree with petitioner that his only offense here was 'a kind of very crude offensive method of stating a political opposition to the president.' Taken in context, and regarding the expressly conditional nature of the statement and the reaction of the listeners, we do not see how it could be interpreted otherwise." In a concurring opinion, William O. Douglas noted, "The Alien and Sedition Laws constituted one of our sorriest chapters; and I had thought we had done away with them forever ... Suppression of speech as an effective police measure is an old, old device, outlawed by our Constitution."

=== Other cases ===
Courts have held that a person is guilty of the offense if certain criteria are met. Specifically, the person must intentionally make a threat in a context, and under such circumstances, that a reasonable person would foresee that the statement would be interpreted by persons hearing or reading it as a serious expression of an intention to harm the president. The statement must also not be the result of mistake, duress or coercion. A true threat is a serious threat and not words uttered as a mere political argument, idle talk, or jest. The standard definition of a true threat does not require actual subjective intent to carry out the threat.

A defendant's statement that if they got the chance they would harm the president is a threat; merely because a threat has been conditional upon the ability of the defendant to carry it out does not render it any less of a threat. It has been ruled that taken together, envelopes containing ambiguous messages, white powder, and cigarette butts that were mailed to the president after the 9/11 anthrax outbreaks conveyed a threatening message. The sending of non-toxic white powder alone to the president has been deemed to be a threat. A broad statement that the president must "see truth" and "uphold Constitution" or else the letter writer will put a bullet in his head count as not expressly conditional as it does not indicate what events or circumstances will prevent the threat from being carried out. However, the statement "if I got hold of President Wilson, I would shoot him" was not an indictable offense because the conditional threat was ambiguous as to whether it was an expression of present or past intent.

The posting of a paper in a public place with a statement that it would be an acceptable sacrifice to God to kill an unjust president was ruled not to be in violation of the statute. The statute does not penalize imagining, wishing, or hoping that the act of killing the president will be committed by someone else. Conversely, the mailing of letters containing the words "kill Reagan" and depicting the president's bleeding head impaled on a stake was considered a serious threat. An oral threat against the president unheard by anyone does not constitute a threat denounced by statute.

Since other statutes make it a crime to assault or to attempt to kill the president, some question has arisen as to whether it is necessary to have a statute banning threats. As the Georgetown Law Journal notes, "It can be argued that the punishment of an attempt against the life of the president is not sufficient; by the time all the elements of an attempt have come into existence the risk to the president becomes too great. On the other hand, the punishment of conduct short of an attempt runs the risk of violating the established principle that intent alone is not punishable ... While ordinarily mere preparation to commit an offense is not punishable, an exception may perhaps be justified by the seriousness of the consequences of an executed threat on the president's life."

== Psychiatric matters ==
According to the 2018 U.S. Attorney's Manual, "Of the individuals who come to the Secret Service's attention as creating a possible danger to one of their protectees, approximately 75 percent are mentally ill." The Secret Service notes, "These are probably Secret Service's most serious cases because it must be determined whether the person making the threat really wants to hurt [Secret Service protectees] or whether they may have some medical problems of their own, for which they need help." It is not uncommon for judges to order psychological evaluations of defendants charged under this statute in accordance with United States federal laws governing offenders with mental diseases or defects. Psychiatrists divide people who threaten the president into three classes: Class 1 includes persons who have expressed overt threatening statements but have made no overt action, Class 2 comprises individuals who have a history of assaultive behaviors toward authority figures, and Class 3 includes person who are considered dangerous and typically have been prosecuted under Section 871.

Dilemmas related to patient confidentiality sometimes arise when a mentally ill subject makes a threat against the president. The termination of nurse Linda Portnoy was upheld after she reported such a statement to the Secret Service. The court noted that the patient was restrained and unable to act on his threats, so he was not an immediate safety risk. It also considered the patient's psychiatrist, not Portnoy, the appropriate person to assess the gravity of his threats. In a study found that in those who threaten the president, the primary differentiating variable related to lethality was "opportunity and happenstance". Conversely, a defendant's writings in his anger management workbook threatening to kill the president upon the defendant's release from the penitentiary were ruled to have fallen within the dangerous patient exception to psychotherapist-patient privilege.

Federal law provides that the director of the facility in which a person is hospitalized due to being found incompetent to stand trial or not guilty only by reason of insanity of a Section 871 violation shall prepare annual or semiannual reports concerning the mental condition of the person and containing recommendations about the need for his continued hospitalization; a copy of the reports shall be submitted to the Director of the United States Secret Service to assist it in carrying out its protective duties. The Ninth Circuit ruled that it is constitutional to hold a presidential threatener beyond Section 871's prescribed five-year statutory maximum if he is found to be dangerous and mentally ill. It is possible under federal law to hold some presidential threateners indefinitely.

== See also ==
- Stalking
- Security incidents involving Donald Trump
- Clear and present danger
- Imminent lawless action
- Lèse-majesté
- List of United States presidential assassination attempts and plots
- List of United States Supreme Court cases, volume 395
- Shouting fire in a crowded theater
- Abrams v. United States, 250 U.S. 616 (1919)
- Brandenburg v. Ohio 395 U.S. 444 (1969)
- Chaplinsky v. New Hampshire, 315 U.S. 568 (1942)
- Dennis v. United States 341 U.S. 494 (1951)
- Feiner v. New York, 340 U.S. 315 (1951)
- Hess v. Indiana 414 U.S. 105 (1973)
- Korematsu v. United States 323 U.S. 214 (1944)
- Masses Publishing Co. v. Patten (1917)
- Sacher v. United States, 343 U.S. 1 (1952)
- Schenck v. United States 248 U.S. 47 (1919)
- Terminiello v. Chicago, 337 U.S. 1 (1949)
- Whitney v. California, 274 U.S. 357 (1927)

== Other articles ==
- Finer (1976), Mens Rea, the First Amendment, and Threats Against the Life of the President, vol. 18, Ariz L Rev, p. 863
- Logan, William S.; Reuterfors, David L.; Bohn Jr., Martin J.; Clark, Charles L. (1984), "The description and classification of presidential threateners", Behavioral Sciences & the Law, 2 (2): 151–167, doi:10.1002/bsl.2370020205
- Megargee, Edwin I. (1986), "A Psychometric Study of Incarcerated Presidential Threateners", Criminal Justice and Behavior, 13 (3): 243–260, doi:10.1177/0093854886013003001, S2CID 144526957
- "2.36: Threats Against the President" (PDF), Criminal Pattern Jury Instructions, p. 137
