= Special assessment on convicted persons =

The special assessment on convicted persons is part of the sentence of all offenders convicted of federal crimes in the United States. It applies on a per-count basis. For any federal felony, the assessment is always $100 per count. The assessment for federal misdemeanors range from $5 to $25. For example, a person convicted of 14 federal felonies would need to pay 14 $100 special assessments, for a total of $1,400. The money is used to fund the Crime Victims Fund. The sentencing judge is not authorized to waive the special assessment, even for the indigent.
