= Sherman v. United States =

- Supreme Court of the United States

Argued January 16, 1958 Decided May 19, 1958
- Full case name: Sherman v. United States
- Citations: 356 U.S. 369 (more) 78 S. Ct. 819; 2 L. Ed. 2d 848; 1958 U.S. LEXIS 1024

Case history
- Prior: Defendant convicted; conviction reversed, Second Circuit, 200 F.2d 880; defendant convicted after retrial; conviction affirmed, 240 F.2d 949; certiorari granted, 353 U.S. 935.
- Subsequent: Conviction reversed

Holding
- Government cannot overcome entrapment defense by dissociating itself from informant's conduct; prior related offenses not sufficient to demonstrate predisposition to commit crime if they occurred long before investigation began.

Court membership
- Chief Justice Earl Warren Associate Justices Hugo Black · Felix Frankfurter; William O. Douglas · Harold H. Burton; Tom C. Clark · John M. Harlan II; William J. Brennan Jr. · Charles E. Whittaker

Case opinions
- Majority: Warren, joined by Black, Burton, Clark, Whittaker
- Concurrence: Frankfurter, joined by Douglas, Harlan, Brennan

Laws applied
- Statutory construction of entrapment

Sherman v. United States, 356 U.S. 369 (1958), was a United States Supreme Court case on the issue of entrapment. Unanimously, the Court overturned the conviction of a recovering New York drug addict who had been repeatedly solicited for drug sales by a fellow former addict who was working with federal agents.

The case was a virtual replay of Sorrells v. United States, the 1932 case in which the justices had first recognized entrapment as a defense. As in that case, all agreed the defendant had been entrapped, but the majority and a separate concurrence were at odds over what the best grounding for the entrapment defense was.

== Background of the case ==
In late August 1951, Kalchinian, a recovering drug addict, met Sherman at a doctor's office where they were both getting treatment for their addiction. They talked about drugs, and Kalchinian eventually asked Sherman if he could get him some as his own methadone program wasn't working. Sherman resisted, citing his own efforts to get clean.

On later chance encounters, Kalchinian continued to entreat Sherman, encountering similar resistance. Finally, in November, he gave in. Kalchinian informed agents of the Federal Bureau of Narcotics (a predecessor to today's Drug Enforcement Administration) whom he had been working with in hopes of lightening his sentence on a pending drug charge, that he had another seller for them. After three drug deals, Sherman was arrested.

== Lower courts ==
Federal prosecutors put on Kalchinian and the government agents working with him. Sherman's defense built their case around entrapment and merely recalled Kalchinian. A conviction was overturned on appeal when it was found that the jury had been improperly instructed on entrapment. A retrial led to another conviction, which was sustained by the appellate court.

The Supreme Court granted certiorari, limited to the entrapment question.

== Decision ==
=== Majority ===
As Charles Evans Hughes had in Sorrells, Warren spoke for the Court. "To determine whether entrapment has been established, a line must be drawn between the trap for the unwary innocent and the trap for the unwary criminal", he said. "We conclude from the evidence that entrapment was established as a matter of law ... We reach our conclusion from the undisputed testimony of the prosecution's witnesses." Kalchinian clearly induced Sherman, and "not only procured a source of narcotics but apparently also induced petitioner to return to the habit".

He scoffed at prosecution arguments that the government was not responsible for Kalchinian's actions. While he was not being paid, he clearly had dealings with the agents in the form of the leniency he was hoping for. Warren noted that the agent in charge of Kalchinian admitted at trial that he didn't inquire about how Kalchinian was getting his sellers. "Law enforcement does not require methods such as this," he concluded.

Sherman's two prior drug convictions did not prove the "ready complaisance" the government claimed he demonstrated, since only one was for dealing and that was nine years old. Warren also found Sherman's efforts to seek treatment, the absence of any drugs in his apartment when it was searched and his failure to profit from the sales to be significant in establishing that he did not have a predisposition to break the law. "The Government's characterization of petitioner's hesitancy to Kalchinian's request as the natural wariness of the criminal cannot fill the evidentiary void," he added.

He declined to reassess the alternative, objective test of entrapment proposed by Justice Owen Roberts in his Sorrells concurrence, that the focus should be on how the government acted rather than the defendant's state of mind. He believed that such a focus would unnecessarily burden prosecutors as they would not be able to raise predisposition in response to any defense attempt to examine police conduct; and that lower courts had ruled that juries should be allowed to consider entrapment, not judges as Roberts had proposed. "To dispose of this case on the ground suggested would entail both overruling a leading decision of this Court and brushing aside the possibility that we would be creating more problems than we would supposedly be solving," he said in conclusion.

=== Concurrence ===
Frankfurter's concurring opinion, in which he was joined by Justices William O. Douglas, John Marshall Harlan II and newly appointed William Brennan, argued nonetheless for Roberts' objective test of locating entrapment in the manner in which the government agents carried out their investigation. "(We fail) to give the doctrine of entrapment the solid foundation that the decisions of the lower courts and criticism of learned writers have clearly shown is needed," he said. Lower courts, he noted, had either ignored the Sorrells standard altogether and focused on narrow facts of the case, or failed to come up with a generalized rule, which was proof enough that it needed to be reassessed.

Congress had passed criminal laws, he asserted, not because it wanted to regulate the means by which the prohibited activities were curtailed but because it wanted to make the actions criminal. "The courts refuse to convict an entrapped defendant, not because his conduct falls outside the proscription of the statute, but because, even if his guilt be admitted, the methods employed on behalf of the Government to bring about conviction cannot be countenanced," he reminded his colleagues, foreshadowing the "outrageous government conduct" theory that Justice William Rehnquist would inadvertently create almost two decades later in United States v. Russell. That, he said, was exactly what the Court had done in this case, expressing its revulsion at the manipulative actions of Kalchinian, which he described as "particularly reprehensible", and the FBN's cavalier attitude toward his freelancing.

In addition, he made two other objections: that defendants might choose to forgo the defense despite the facts of the case out of fear that an inquiry into their predisposition to offend would allow the prosecution to bring up prior bad acts that might not otherwise be relevant, and that jury verdicts of entrapment were not as reliable in deriving precedent for future cases.

== Subsequent jurisprudence ==
- United States v. Russell, 411 U.S. 423 (1973). Government agent supplying key ingredient for manufacture of controlled substance did not constitute entrapment.
- Hampton v. United States, 425 U.S. 484 (1976). Defendant's belief that he and government informant were selling a legal counterfeit drug and misrepresenting it as heroin did not overcome government showing that he was predisposed to sell heroin in any event.
- Jacobson v. United States, 503 U.S. 540 (1992). Previously legal actions do not of themselves prove predisposition to violate later law prohibiting them; predisposition inquiry to be limited to defendant's history prior to contact with government agents.

== See also ==
- List of United States Supreme Court cases, volume 356
