= ATF fictional drug stash sting operations =

Campaign of sting operations

Between 2011 and 2014, the Bureau of Alcohol, Tobacco, Firearms and Explosives (ATF), part of the United States Department of Justice, engaged in a campaign of sting operations in which individuals were enticed to participate in gun and drug-related crimes against fictitious stash house targets for which they were then arrested and convicted. The fabricated crimes were in fact entirely the creation of ATF, and as described by two federal judges, carried severe sentences (typically 15 years), but were likely to cause grave unfairness and miscarriage of justice.

A USA Today investigation in 2013 showed that over 1000 individuals have been incarcerated for lengthy periods since 2011 for such fake crimes, and that the strategy has become a key part of the Bureau's enforcement practice. ATF officials stated that the strategy pre-emptively targeted people likely to commit serious crime rather than waiting for them to do so; opponents and critics, and later, judges, expressed concerns that it was tantamount to entrapment and punishing people for thoughts and possibilities rather than actual criminal acts, by presenting them with deliberately hard to resist fabricated inducements and goading them to become a participant, or to engage in more extreme criminal activities, up to an extent chosen almost completely by ATF.

In a 2013 federal case (Brown et al.), district court judge Rubén Castillo determined that lawyers had made "a strong showing of potential bias" relating to the operation of robbery stings conducted by the ATF, and ordered prosecutors to identify everyone that the government had charged in similar cases in the Northern District of Illinois. In 2014 California judge Otis Wright went further and dismissed another such case (Hudson) as "outrageous government conduct" and "unconstitutional", stating that it had neither prevented nor detected crime, but cost the taxpayer dearly, and that the overwhelming extent of ATF direction of the purported crime, and the level of ATF involvement, made the ATF operative more of a participant rather than an observer, the sentence a reflection of ATF whim rather than defendant's own conduct, and the case into one that lacked due process.

== Accusation of racial bias ==
In legal proceedings filed in Chicago, attorneys sought dismissal of charges against 40 defendants. One study that was unsealed had concluded that the ATF showed racial bias in target selection for the sting operations. The study concluded that the disparity between white and black defendants was so large that the chances of it being explained by any reason other than racial bias was around zero.

== U.S. v. Hudson, Whitfield & Dunlap (decided 2014) ==
The case was one of many US Government cases where a situation was presented to members of the public, who were tempted into committing a crime related to drugs, theft, or firearms, on the basis of a fabricated situation "sting operation". In this case, the judge Otis D. Wright II dismissed citing outrageous government conduct. He found that by fabricating every aspect of the supposed circumstances in a manner calculated to entice the subjects' involvement, the government acted "repugnant[ly] to the Constitution" by creating a crime "cut from whole cloth" that was intended not to fail to entice involvement, and was not related to any actual or existent criminal enterprise, but was calculated to produce a sentence of around 15 years. In his order dismissing the charges, Wright cited the words of James Madison from Federalist No. 51, "In framing a government which is to be administered by men over men, the great difficulty lies in this: you must first enable the government to control the governed; and in the next place oblige it to control itself."

== U.S. entrapment case law ==
In Jacobson v. United States (503 U.S. 540 (1990)) the U.S. Supreme Court considered an entrapment case from outside drug enforcement, and overturned the conviction of a Nebraska man for ordering child pornography after two years of being cajoled by material created by postal inspectors. The Court held that the government must show that predisposition existed before the government became involved, and prior behavior when an activity was legal does not constitute evidence of predisposition to break the law if the conduct is subsequently made illegal. This is in contrast to Hampton v. United States, where predisposition existed, even though the drugs and drug-related activity of the defendant in that case wholly coincided with the encouragement of law enforcement agents.

== See also ==
- Intention (criminal law)
- Pre-crime—criminal justice system approaches to crimes not yet committed
- Solicitation § United States
