= United States v. Russell =

- Supreme Court of the United States

Argued February 27, 1973 Decided April 24, 1973
- Full case name: United States v. Richard Russell
- Citations: 411 U.S. 423 (more) 93 S. Ct. 1637; 36 L. Ed. 2d 366; 1973 U.S. LEXIS 79

Case history
- Prior: Defendant convicted, United States District Court for the Western District of Washington; conviction reversed, United States Court of Appeals for the Ninth Circuit, 459 F.2d 671 (1972); certiorari to the 9th Circuit granted, 409 U.S. 911 (1972).
- Subsequent: Conviction affirmed

Holding
- Government agent's active participation in criminal conspiracy was not entrapment.

Court membership
- Chief Justice Warren E. Burger Associate Justices William O. Douglas · William J. Brennan Jr. Potter Stewart · Byron White; Thurgood Marshall · Harry Blackmun; Lewis F. Powell Jr. · William Rehnquist

Case opinions
- Majority: Rehnquist, joined by Burger, White, Blackmun, Powell
- Dissent: Douglas, joined by Brennan
- Dissent: Stewart, joined by Brennan, Marshall

Laws applied
- Existing entrapment jurisprudence

United States v. Russell, 411 U.S. 423 (1973), is a Supreme Court case dealing with the entrapment defense. The court split 5-4 and maintained the subjective theory that had first been adopted in Sorrells v. United States, 287 U.S. 435 (1932). Although an undercover federal agent had helped procure a key ingredient for an illegal methamphetamine manufacturing operation, and assisted in the process, the Court followed its earlier rulings on the subject and found that the defendant had a predisposition to make and sell illegal drugs whether he worked with the government or not.

Russell had admitted to that during his appeal, but he and his lawyers argued that the entrapment defense should focus entirely on what the federal operatives did and not his state of mind. They asked the Court to overrule two previous cases that had established this "subjective" test in favor of the "objective" one they advocated. It declined to do so. But Justice William Rehnquist pondered the possibility that what has become known as "outrageous government conduct" might force a judicial hand in an entrapment case regardless of any specific rights that had been or not been violated. While he backed away from it in a later opinion, his words have become a rallying point for advocates of the objective entrapment standard.

== Background of the case ==
In late 1969, Joe Shapiro, an agent for the federal Bureau of Narcotics and Dangerous Drugs (later to become part of the Drug Enforcement Administration), was assigned to locate an illegal methamphetamine ("meth") production lab believed to be on Whidbey Island in Washington. His investigation led him to Richard Russell and John and Patrick Connolly, the lab's proprietors. On December 7, they met and he represented himself to them as a member of a group which wanted to control meth production and distribution in the region. He offered to supply them with phenyl-2-propanone(P2P), a necessary ingredient in meth manufacture which had become difficult to obtain, in return for half of the resulting output. He insisted beforehand on being shown the lab and given a sample of what they could produce.

John Connolly gave Shapiro from his most recent output, and Patrick Connolly said they had been able to make three pounds of meth since May of that year. Shapiro also observed an empty P2P bottle at the house. Two days later, he returned with 100 g of P2P. While he mostly watched as the trio made their meth, at one point, according to later court testimony, he and Russell helped pick up some pieces of dropped aluminum foil and put it into a flask. Patrick Connolly finished the rest of the process, and Shapiro stopped by the next morning to pick up his half of the meth. He also bought a portion of the remainder for $60.

A month later, he returned and asked Connolly if he was still interested in doing business. Connolly said yes, but that he would not be able to sell him any as he had gotten some bottles of P2P elsewhere and was busy making another batch. Three days later, Shapiro returned with a search warrant. Among other items, he seized two bottles of P2P, one an empty 500-g container, the other a partially full 100-g one (not the one he had originally given them). All three were arrested and charged with five separate violations of federal drug laws.

== Lower courts ==
=== Trial ===
John Connolly did not appear. His brother and Russell were found guilty on all five counts. Both raised the entrapment defense, arguing that while they would have made and sold meth regardless of Shapiro's involvement, his supplying of an ingredient that, while legal, was difficult to get due to the bureau's own efforts to dissuade chemical companies from selling it and requiring that those who did sell only to buyers with a valid manufacturer's license, constituted entrapment as a matter of law.

==== Issue ====
In Sorrells v. United States, 287 U.S. 435 (1932), the case where it had first recognized entrapment as a valid defense, and Sherman v. United States, 356 U.S. 369 (1958), another entrapment case involving an undercover drug investigation, the Court had chosen to ground entrapment in the question of whether it could be established that the defendant had a "predisposition" to commit the crime absent government involvement. This has become known as the "subjective" test of entrapment since it involves evaluating the defendant's state of mind. It was somewhat controversial in both decisions, even though they were unanimous in overturning the convictions, because concurrences in both cases had criticized it sharply and called instead for an "objective" standard which concentrated instead on the behavior of law enforcement.

Connolly and Russell both argued that, in their cases, it was the government agent's assistance in their enterprise — and only that — which had made the specific offenses they were tried for possible. The jury rejected that argument, following instead the subjective entrapment standard, holding that they were predisposed to commit the crime in any event.

=== Appeal ===
The United States Court of Appeals for the Ninth Circuit agreed that the conduct of the government agents trumped any inclination to make and deal meth and overturned the conviction. Prosecutors petitioned the Supreme Court for certiorari.

== Decision ==
For the first time in an entrapment case, not only did the Court uphold a conviction, but split its decision.

=== Majority ===
After reviewing the case and Russell's arguments for adopting a new standard for entrapment, Rehnquist first pointed to practical problems specific to the case:

Even if we were to surmount the difficulties attending the notion that due process of law can be embodied in fixed rules, and those attending respondent's particular formulation, the rule he proposes would not appear to be of significant benefit to him. For, on the record presented, it appears that he cannot fit within the terms of the very rule he proposes.

The record discloses that although the propanone was difficult to obtain, it was by no means impossible. The defendants admitted making the drug both before and after those batches made with the propanone supplied by Shapiro. Shapiro testified that he saw an empty bottle labeled phenyl-2-propanone on his first visit to the laboratory on December 7, 1969. And when the laboratory was searched pursuant to a search warrant on January 10, 1970, two additional bottles labeled phenyl-2-propanone were seized. Thus, the facts in the record amply demonstrate that the propanone used in the illicit manufacture of methamphetamine not only could have been obtained without the intervention of Shapiro but was in fact obtained by these defendants.

The next sentence has reverberated around discourse on the entrapment defense ever since: "...we may some day be presented with a situation in which the conduct of law enforcement agents is so outrageous that due process principles would absolutely bar the government from invoking judicial processes to obtain a conviction." But, the justice continued, "the instant case is distinctly not of that breed". Later, he acknowledged the possibility of "overzealous law enforcement".

He went on to reject the notion of changing the entrapment standard, saying the Court had already reaffirmed the subjective test in Sherman and saw no reason to change now. He reiterated previous justices' argument against it from those decisions, and rapped the lower court: "We think that the decision of the Court of Appeals in this case quite unnecessarily introduces an unmanageably subjective standard which is contrary to the holdings of this Court in Sorrells and Sherman ... [T]here are circumstances when the use of deceit is the only practicable law enforcement technique available. It is only when the Government's deception actually implants the criminal design in the mind of the defendant that the defense of entrapment comes into play."

=== Dissents ===
==== Douglas ====
"In my view, the fact that the chemical ingredient supplied by the federal agent might have been obtained from other sources is quite irrelevant", replied Justice William O. Douglas. "Supplying the chemical ingredient used in the manufacture of this batch of 'speed' made the United States an active participant in the unlawful activity". He pointed to an appellate decision that had thrown out a counterfeiting conviction where the undercover Secret Service had supplied the paper and ink.

He insisted no conviction in such a case should be allowed. "Federal agents play a debased role when they become the instigators of the crime, or partners in its commission, or the creative brain behind the illegal scheme. That is what the federal agent did here when he furnished the accused with one of the chemical ingredients needed to manufacture the unlawful drug."

William Brennan signed this opinion as well.

==== Stewart ====
Potter Stewart sought to make an argument for the objective test, calling it "the only one truly consistent with the underlying rationale of the defense". Like the concurrences in the earlier two opinions, he argued that a judge, not a jury, should decide whether law enforcement crossed the line. He rejected the idea that the defendant's conduct or state of mind had any bearing, since arguing entrapment by its very nature concedes commission of the act: "He may not have originated the precise plan or the precise details, but he was "predisposed" in the sense that he has proved to be quite capable of committing the crime".

Like Owen Roberts in Sorrells, he expressed concern that a predisposition test would needlessly deter defendants who might otherwise have a case based on the behavior of the government agents involved from doing so, since it would allow the prosecution to bring up prior bad acts that would be prejudicial to the jury and otherwise inadmissible.

Stated another way, this subjective test means that the Government is permitted to entrap a person with a criminal record or bad reputation, and then to prosecute him for the manufactured crime, confident that his record or reputation itself will be enough to show that he was predisposed to commit the offense anyway ... In my view, a person's alleged "predisposition" to crime should not expose him to government participation in the criminal transaction that would be otherwise unlawful.

He next turned to the specifics of the case. Like Douglas, he argued that the government's supplying the propanone, a chemical made scarce but not illegal by its own efforts, and then turning around and prosecuting Russell and the Connollys for the methamphetamine made with that propanone, and only that batch, was entrapment no matter how predisposed the three were or whether they were able to obtain propanone from other sources.

Brennan and Thurgood Marshall joined Stewart.

== Subsequent jurisprudence ==
- Hampton v. United States, 452 U.S. 484 (1976). Defendant's belief that he and government informant were selling legal substance and claiming it to be heroin did not overcome evidence showing predisposition to commit crime. Rehnquist backs away slightly from "outrageous government conduct" here, maintaining that defendants must show a specific violation of constitutional rights or due process.
- Jacobson v. United States, 504 U.S. 530 (1992). Prior acts by defendant later made illegal but legal at the time do not demonstrate predisposition per se; prosecution must show beyond reasonable doubt that defendant was predisposed to commit crime prior to any contact by government agents.

== See also ==
- List of United States Supreme Court cases, volume 411
