= Hampton v. United States =

- Supreme Court of the United States

Argued December 1, 1975 Decided April 27, 1976
- Full case name: Hampton, a/k/a Byers v. United States
- Citations: 425 U.S. 484 (more) 96 S. Ct. 1646; 48 L. Ed. 2d 113; 1976 U.S. LEXIS 49

Case history
- Prior: Defendant convicted of violating 21 U.S.C. § 841(a) in United States District Court for the Eastern District of Missouri; conviction affirmed, 507 F.2d 832 (8th Cir. 1974); cert. granted, 420 U.S. 1003 (1975).
- Subsequent: Conviction affirmed

Holding
- Government agents supplying illegal drugs for transaction does not constitute entrapment where defendant had predisposition to sell drugs regardless of supplier.

Court membership
- Chief Justice Warren E. Burger Associate Justices William J. Brennan Jr. · Potter Stewart; Byron White · Thurgood Marshall; Harry Blackmun · Lewis F. Powell Jr. William Rehnquist · John P. Stevens

Case opinions
- Majority: Rehnquist, joined by Burger, White
- Concurrence: Powell, joined by Blackmun
- Dissent: Brennan, joined by Stewart, Marshall
- Stevens took no part in the consideration or decision of the case.

Laws applied
- Existing entrapment case law

Hampton v. United States, 425 U.S. 484 (1976), is a United States Supreme Court decision on the subject of Entrapment. By a 5–3 margin, the Court upheld the conviction of a Missouri man for selling heroin even though all the drug sold was supplied to him, he claimed, by a Drug Enforcement Administration informant who had, in turn, gotten it from the DEA. The majority held that the record showed Hampton was predisposed to sell drugs no matter his source.

The case came before the court when the defendant argued that while he was predisposed, it was irrelevant since the government's possible role as sole supplier in the case constituted the sort of "outrageous government conduct" that Justice William Rehnquist had speculated could lead to the reversal of a conviction in the court's last entrapment case, United States v. Russell. Rehnquist was not impressed and rejected the argument in his majority opinion.

The dissents agreed that the government's purported action was outrageous and that the conviction should be overturned on those grounds. The justices were among those who had said in Russell that the "subjective" entrapment standard adopted by the Court since it first recognized entrapment as a valid defense in Sorrells v. United States, was less fair and appropriate than the "objective" standard of evaluating official conduct, which dissents and concurrences in entrapment cases over the years had argued for. However, this was the last entrapment case to feature that conflict.

== Background of the case ==
In late February 1974, Hampton and a DEA informant known as Hutton were playing pool at the Pud bar in St. Louis when Hampton noticed the needle marks on Hutton's arms. He said he needed money and could obtain heroin to sell. Hutton responded that he could find a buyer. After the conversation, he called his handler, DEA agent Terry Sawyer, and reported the proposal.

At 10 p.m. on February 25, Hampton and Hutton met the undercover Sawyer and another DEA agent, McDowell, and sold him a tiny packet of heroin for $145. Hampton told the agents that he could get more and gave him his phone number. Sawyer called the next day and arranged another deal. Later, in a parked car, Hampton gave Sawyer another packet, whereupon he said he had to get the money from the trunk. When he opened it, other agents moved in to arrest Hampton.

== Lower courts ==
=== Trial ===
Hampton's story was very different from the one presented by federal prosecutors. He claimed Hutton had, in response to his cash flow problems, come up with the idea to sell not heroin but a fake, perfectly legal, he thought. Previous to the deals with the DEA the two had, he said, already sold it to one gullible buyer and that he solicited the agents in order to make more money. At no time had he ever believed the two were actually selling heroin, he claimed. He raised the entrapment defense but proposed an alternate to the standard entrapment instruction.

The jury chose not to believe him and convicted.

=== Appeal ===
The Eighth Circuit Court of Appeals affirmed the conviction, relying on the Supreme Court's Russell holding. The Court thereby rejected Hampton's argument that, whatever his predisposition, the conduct of the government operatives in his narrative was outrageous enough to trump it.

== Supreme Court case ==
The Supreme Court granted certiorari on the entrapment question alone.

=== Decision ===
==== Majority ====
Rehnquist said that Hampton had misunderstood his comments about outrageous government conduct in Russell, and then said it didn't apply here. "Admittedly petitioner's case is different from Russell's but the difference is one of degree, not of kind". He conceded that the government's role, at least in the defense case, was more significant but stuck with the admitted predisposition towards drug dealing in rejecting any entrapment claim. Again, he decisively rejected any effort to assert the objective standard.

"The limitations of the Due Process Clause of the Fifth Amendment come into play only when the Government activity in question violates some protected right of the defendant", he wrote, in a comment read as scaling back his Russell aside. "(T)he police conduct here no more deprived defendant of any right secured to him by the United States Constitution than did the police conduct in Russell deprive Russell of any rights."

===== Concurrence =====
While likewise rejecting Hampton's defense, Lewis Powell and Harry Blackmun took issue with what they saw as Rehnquist's overly broad assertion that (as they put it), "the concept of fundamental fairness inherent in the guarantee of due process would never prevent the conviction of a predisposed defendant, regardless of the outrageousness of police behavior in light of the surrounding circumstances."

"I do not understand Russell or earlier cases delineating the predisposition-focused defense of entrapment to have gone so far", Powell wrote. He noted that the jurisprudence was very limited, and that the Court had, for one, not yet had the opportunity to consider an entrapment claim from some source other than controlled-substance enforcement. "In these circumstances, I am unwilling to conclude that an analysis other than one limited to predisposition would never be appropriate under due process principles".

==== Dissent ====
William Brennan made the argument once again for the "objective" entrapment standard from previous concurrences and dissents, and said that this would necessitate overturning the conviction. He also said that he did not find the defendant predisposed to commit the crime either. "(T)he Government's role in the criminal activity involved in this case was more pervasive than the Government involvement in Russell ... In my view, the police activity in this case was beyond permissible limits."

He contrasted the two cases, noting that in the earlier case the government agent had merely supplied an ingredient for the manufacture of methamphetamine that was legal yet difficult to obtain, and one the defendant in that case had demonstrably been able to obtain from other sources than the government undercover agent. As well, in Russell the illegal manufacturing operation had been producing the drug well before the federal operation began.

But in the instant case, not only was the heroin a completely illegal substance, it had been supplied wholly by the DEA. There was also no evidence introduced beyond his admission as such that Hampton had been dealing drugs prior to Hutton's approach. "The beginning and end of this crime thus coincided exactly with the Government's entry into and withdrawal from the criminal activity involved in this case, while the Government was not similarly involved in Russell's crime".

He responded quite strongly to Rehnquist:

Whether the differences from the Russell situation are of degree or of kind ... I think they clearly require a different result. Where the Government's agent deliberately sets up the accused by supplying him with contraband and then bringing him to another agent as a potential purchaser, the Government's role has passed the point of toleration ... The Government is doing nothing less than buying contraband from itself through an intermediary and jailing the intermediary ... There is little, if any, law enforcement interest promoted by such conduct; plainly it is not designed to discover ongoing drug traffic. Rather, such conduct deliberately entices an individual to commit a crime. That the accused is "predisposed" cannot possibly justify the action of government officials in purposefully creating the crime. No one would suggest that the police could round up and jail all "predisposed" individuals, yet that is precisely what set-ups like the instant one are intended to accomplish.

In any case where an individual was prosecuted for selling drugs provided to him by a government operative, he said, conviction should be barred as a matter of law.

Justice John Paul Stevens, then newly appointed to the Court, took no part in the case.

== Subsequent jurisprudence ==
- Jacobson v. United States, 503 U.S. 540 (1990). The Court finally does consider an entrapment case from outside drug enforcement, and narrowly overturns the conviction of a Nebraska man for ordering child pornography after two years of being cajoled by material created by postal inspectors. Held: the government must show that predisposition existed before the government became involved, and legal behavior does not constitute a predisposition to violate the law after such conduct becomes illegal.

== See also ==
- List of United States Supreme Court cases, volume 425
