= South Prairie Construction Co. v. Local No. 627, International Union of Operating Engineers =

South Prairie Construction Co. v. Local No. 627, International Union of Operating Engineers, AFL-CIO
- Supreme Court of the United States

Decided May 24, 1976
- Full case name: South Prairie Construction Co. v. Local No. 627, International Union of Operating Engineers, AFL-CIO, et al.
- Citations: 425 U.S. 800 (more) 96 S. Ct. 1842; 48 L. Ed. 2d 382

Court membership
- Chief Justice Warren E. Burger Associate Justices William J. Brennan Jr. · Potter Stewart; Byron White · Thurgood Marshall; Harry Blackmun · Lewis F. Powell Jr. William Rehnquist · John P. Stevens

Case opinion
- Per curiam

South Prairie Construction Co. v. Local No 627, International Union of Operating Engineers, AFL-CIO, 425 U.S. 800 (1976), is a US labor law case, concerning the scope of labor rights in the United States.

== Facts ==
The union, Local No 627 of the International Union of Operating Engineers claimed that the South Prairie Construction Co and Peter Kiewit Sons' Co were both a single employer, and that they were committing an unfair labor practice under the National Labor Relations Act 1935 §8(a)(5) by refusing to apply a collective agreement to them. The union was already the representative of the bargaining unit.

The Administrative law judge held that the firms were one employer. The National Labor Relations Board held that South Prairie Co and Kiewit Co were separate employers. The Court of Appeals, DC Circuit, decided the firms were a single employer, reversing the NLRB decision under Radio and Television Broadcast Technicians Local Union 1264 v. Broadcast Service [1965] USSC 51, 380 U.S. 255 (1965).

== Judgment ==
The Supreme Court found that the DC Circuit had legitimately identified two corporations as a single employer given that they had a "very substantial qualitative degree of centralized control of labor", but that further determination of the relevant bargaining unit should have been remitted to the NLRB.

Stating that it was applying the criteria recognized by this Court in Radio and Television Broadcast Technicians Local Union 1264 v. Broadcast Service, 380 U.S. 255, 85 S.Ct. 876, 13 L.Ed.2d 789 (1965),3 the Court of Appeals disagreed with the Board and decided that on the facts presented Kiewit and South Prairie were a single "employer." It reasoned that in addition to the "presence of a very substantial qualitative degree of centralized control of labor relations," the facts "evidence a substantial qualitative degree of interrelation of operations and common management one that we are satisfied would not be found in the arm's length relationship existing among unintegrated companies". 171 U.S.App.D.C. 102, 108, 109, 518 F.2d 1040, 1046, 1047 (1975). The Board's finding to the contrary was, therefore, in the view of the Court of Appeals "not warranted by the record." Id., at 109, 518 F.2d, at 1047.

The Court of Appeals was evidently of the view that since the Board dismissed the complaint it had necessarily decided that the employees of Kiewit and South Prairie would not constitute an appropriate bargaining unit under § 9. But while the Board's opinion referred to its cases in this area and included a finding that "the employees of each constitute a separate bargaining unit," 206 N.L.R.B. 562, 563 (1973), its brief discussion was set in the context of what it obviously considered was the dispositive issue, namely, whether the two firms were separate employers. We think a fair reading of its decision discloses that it did not address the "unit" question on the basis of any assumption, Arguendo, that it might have been wrong on the threshold "employer" issue.

In foreclosing the Board from the opportunity to determine the appropriate bargaining unit under §9, the Court of Appeals did not give "due observance (to) the distribution of authority made by Congress as between its power to regulate commerce and the reviewing power which it has conferred upon the courts under Article III of the Constitution." FCC v. Pottsville Broadcasting Co., [1940] USSC 15; 309 U.S. 134, 141[1940] USSC 15; 60 S.Ct. 437, 440[1940] USSC 15; 84 L.Ed. 656, 661 (1940).

The petitions for certiorari are accordingly granted, and that part of the judgment of the Court of Appeals which set aside the determination of the Board on the question of whether Kiewit and South Prairie were a single employer is affirmed. That part of the judgment which held that the two firms' employees constituted the appropriate bargaining unit for purposes of the Act, and which directed the Board to issue an enforcement order, is vacated, and the case is remanded to the Court of Appeals for proceedings consistent with this opinion.

== See also ==
- United States labor law
