= Michael J. Lewis (composer) =

British composer (born 1939)

- Born: January 11, 1939 (age 87); Aberystwyth, Ceredigion, Wales
- Education: Guildhall School of Music and Drama
- Musical career
- Genres: Film score, musical theatre, choral, Welsh traditional
- Occupations: Composer, conductor
- Website: michaeljlewis.us

Michael John Lewis (born 11 January 1939) is a Welsh composer and conductor. He is known for his various film, theatre, and television scores.

== Career ==
He studied harmony, counterpoint and composition at the Guildhall School of Music and Drama. After a brief teaching career in North London he became a full time composer at the age of 24.

His first major work was Please, Sir, a stage musical that attracted the attention of English writer/director Brian Forbes and actor Richard Attenborough. In 1968, Forbes invited Lewis to score his film The Madwoman of Chaillot, starring Katharine Hepburn. That film score, Lewis's first, won him an Ivor Novello Award in 1970. Subsequently, he composed the scores for Upon This Rock, a dramatized documentary of St. Peter’s Basilica starring Orson Welles, which premiered at the 1970 Venice Film Festival, and Julius Caesar starring Charlton Heston, Jason Robards and John Gielgud. 1973 saw Lewis' Broadway musical debut with Cyrano starring Christopher Plummer, who won a Tony Award for his stellar performance. The show was co-written with Anthony Burgess, author of the novel A Clockwork Orange.

Through the late 1970s and early 80s, Michael J. Lewis scored a series of films including the British cult horror film, Theatre of Blood, starring Vincent Price, The Medusa Touch, starring Richard Burton and the animated film, The Lion, the Witch, and the Wardrobe, which earned Lewis an Emmy Award.

In 1982, Lewis composed the score for Franklin J Schaffner’s thriller, Sphinx, starring Frank Langella and Lesley-Anne Down. Lewis worked with Franklin J. Schaffner a second time on MGM/UA ’s musical, Yes, Giorgio, starring Luciano Pavarotti. The music credit was shared with John Williams.

Later, Lewis began writing British TV commercials, (British Rail, Tesco, 7 Up, Ford, Audi), and subsequently relocated to the United States in 1986, where he scored national TV campaigns including IBM, Lipton, Kentucky Fried Chicken, 3M, and Connecticut National Bank. Lewis's first US TV score, The Rose and the Jackal, starring Christopher Reeve, won him a Cable ACE Award nomination.

Following the death of his daughter Susannah in 1994, Lewis moved away from film scores to concentrate on writing and adapting the music, sacred and secular, of his native Wales. He issued The Romantic Splendour of Wales (Gogoniant Rhamantaidd Cymru) CD in 1997, recorded in Welsh. This spawned further recordings in subsequent years including, In the Language of Heaven, a collection of Welsh Folk songs performed a cappella in Welsh), The Golden Harp, Hearts Afire, Piano Moon, Celtic Moon, and others.

Lewis has lived in the Wiggins, Mississippi area for many years, where he continues to work as a composer, arranger, and musician.

== Filmography ==
- The Madwoman of Chaillot (1969)
- Upon This Rock (1970)
- The Man Who Haunted Himself (1970)
- Julius Caesar (1970)
- Unman, Wittering and Zigo (1971)
- Running Scared (1972)
- Theatre of Blood (1973)
- Baxter! (1973)
- 11 Harrowhouse (1974)
- 92 in the Shade (1975)
- Russian Roulette (1975)
- The Stick Up (1977)
- The Medusa Touch (1978)
- The Legacy (1978)
- The Lion, the Witch and the Wardrobe (1979)
- The Passage (1979)
- North Sea Hijack (1980)
- The Unseen (1980)
- Sphinx (1981)
- Yes, Giorgio (1982)
- The Hound of the Baskervilles (1983)
- On the Third Day (1983)
- The Naked Face (1984)
- Bad Manners (1984)
- The Rose and the Jackal (1990)
- Deadly Target (1994)
