= United States v. Rawls =

2020 Third Circuit case on civil contempt duration and compelled decryption

- Court: United States Court of Appeals for the Third Circuit
- Full case name: In re Grand Jury Subpoena Duces Tecum Dated March 25, 2015
- Argued: March 15, 2019
- Decided: February 6, 2020
- Citation: No. 17-3205

Case history
- Prior history: United States v. Apple MacPro Computer, 851 F.3d 238 (3d Cir. 2017)

Court membership
- Judges sitting: Julio M. Fuentes, Theodore McKee, Jane Richards Roth

Case opinions
- Majority: Fuentes
- Concurrence: McKee
- Dissent: Roth

Laws applied
- 28 U.S.C. § 1826(a); amend. V

United States v. Rawls, No. 17-3205 (3d Cir. 2020) (formally, In re Grand Jury Subpoena Duces Tecum Dated March 25, 2015), is a precedential case decided by the United States Court of Appeals for the Third Circuit on February 6, 2020. The appeal addressed whether the 18-month limit on civil contempt confinement under 28 U.S.C. § 1826(a) applied to Francis Rawls, a former Philadelphia Police Department sergeant who had been incarcerated for over four years for refusing to comply with a court order to decrypt two encrypted external hard drives seized during a federal child pornography investigation. In a 2–1 decision, the Third Circuit ordered his release, holding that the statutory cap applied.

== The case ==
Francis Rawls was a sergeant with the Philadelphia Police Department. As part of an investigation into Rawls's access to child pornography, the Delaware County Criminal Investigations Unit executed a search warrant at his residence in 2015, seizing an Apple iPhone 5S, an Apple iPhone 6 Plus, an Apple Mac Pro computer, and two Western Digital external hard drives, all of which were protected with encryption software. Rawls voluntarily provided the password for the iPhone 5S but did not provide the passwords for the Mac Pro or the external hard drives. Agents from the Department of Homeland Security subsequently obtained a federal search warrant and were able to determine the Mac Pro's password independently. Forensic examination of the Mac Pro revealed logs indicating visits to child exploitation websites and evidence that Rawls had downloaded thousands of files known to be child pornography, which were stored on the encrypted external hard drives. Rawls's sister stated that he had shown her hundreds of child pornography images on the external hard drives.

In August 2015, a federal magistrate judge issued a decryption order requiring Rawls to produce all seized devices in an unencrypted state pursuant to the All Writs Act. Rawls challenged the order on Fifth Amendment grounds, but his motion to quash was denied. Rawls and his counsel then appeared for a forensic examination, where Rawls provided the password for the iPhone 6 Plus but claimed he could not remember the passwords for the external hard drives and entered incorrect passwords. The district court found that Rawls knew the passwords and was deliberately withholding them, held him in civil contempt, and ordered his incarceration until he complied. Rawls was incarcerated on September 30, 2015. He was never formally charged with a crime.

Rawls appealed his contempt confinement, arguing that the decryption order violated his Fifth Amendment privilege against self-incrimination. In 2017, the Third Circuit affirmed the contempt order, holding that the ”foregone conclusion” doctrine applied: because the government already possessed his devices and knew of their contents, compelling Rawls to decrypt them would not add to the information already in the government's possession. The Supreme Court of the United States denied certiorari in 2018. Rawls ultimately remained in custody for more than four years.

== The decision ==
While his certiorari petition was pending, Rawls filed a motion seeking release under 28 U.S.C. § 1826(a), a federal statute which limits civil contempt confinement to 18 months for any witness refusing to comply with a court order to provide information. The government argued that the statute did not apply because Rawls was a suspect rather than a witness, and because no formal court proceeding was underway. The district court denied the motion, and Rawls appealed.

On February 6, 2020, the Third Circuit reversed the lower court in a 2–1 decision and ordered Rawls's immediate release. Writing for the majority, Judge Fuentes held that Rawls was a "witness" under § 1826(a), that the search warrant enforcement proceedings constituted a "proceeding before or ancillary to any court," and that the 18-month cap applied even to a person who was simultaneously a suspect in connection with other offenses. Judge McKee concurred separately, criticizing the government's decision to continue pursuing civil contempt given the substantial evidence it already possessed to charge Rawls with child pornography offenses. Judge Roth dissented, arguing that Rawls was not a "witness" because he was not being asked to testify but only to comply with a search warrant under the All Writs Act, and that § 1826(a) was therefore inapplicable. Following the ruling, Rawls was freed from federal custody.

== See also ==
- Key disclosure law
- Fisher v. United States
