= Suter v. Artist M. =

- Supreme Court of the United States

Decided March 25, 1992
- Full case name: Suter v. Artist M.
- Citations: 503 U.S. 347 (more)

Holding
- The Adoption Assistance and Child Welfare Act does not confer upon parents a private right to sue a state for not making "reasonable efforts" towards family reunification under that act, and they cannot sue for that under Section 1983.

Court membership
- Chief Justice William Rehnquist Associate Justices Byron White · Harry Blackmun; John P. Stevens · Sandra Day O'Connor; Antonin Scalia · Anthony Kennedy; David Souter · Clarence Thomas

Case opinions
- Majority: Rehnquist
- Dissent: Blackmun, joined by Stevens

Laws applied
- Adoption Assistance and Child Welfare Act

Suter v. Artist M., 503 U.S. 347 (1992), was a United States Supreme Court case in which the court held that the Adoption Assistance and Child Welfare Act does not confer upon parents a private right to sue a state for not making "reasonable efforts" towards family reunification under that act, and they cannot sue for that under Section 1983. Suter is among a pattern of cases limiting the reach of federal and state laws intended to govern parental abuse and neglect. Another is DeShaney v. Winnebago County.

== Background ==
The Adoption Assistance and Child Welfare Act of 1980 provides that a state will be reimbursed by the federal government for certain expenses it incurs in administering foster care and adoption services, if it submits a plan for approval by the Secretary of Health and Human Services. Among its requisite features, an approved plan must provide that it "shall be in effect in all" of a state's political subdivisions and "be mandatory upon them" and that "reasonable efforts will be made" to prevent removal of children from their homes and to facilitate reunification of families where removal has occurred.

The plaintiffs in this case, child beneficiaries of the act including Artist M., sought declaratory and injunctive relief, alleging that Suter, the Director and the Guardianship Administrator of the Illinois agency responsible for investigating charges of child abuse and neglect and providing services for abused and neglected children and their families, had failed to make reasonable efforts to preserve and reunite families. The federal District Court denied the state's motion to dismiss, ruling that the act contained an implied cause of action and that suit could also be brought under 42 U.S.C. § 1983. The court entered an injunction against the state, and the Seventh Circuit Court of Appeals affirmed. That court relied on Wilder v. Virginia Hospital Assn., 496 U. S. 498, to hold that the "reasonable efforts" clause of the act could be enforced through a § 1983 action, and applied the standard of Cort v. Ash to find that the act created an implied right of action entitling respondents to bring suit directly under the Act.

== Opinion of the court ==
The Supreme Court issued an opinion on March 25, 1992.
