= Moe v. Confederated Salish & Kootenai Tribes =

- Supreme Court of the United States

Decided April 27, 1976
- Full case name: Moe v. Confederated Salish & Kootenai Tribes
- Citations: 425 U.S. 463 (more)

Holding
- State tax on personal property owned by tribe members inside reservations and state sales tax on trade between two tribe members were preempted by the General Allotment Act. Charging non-members sales tax on commerce with tribe members was constitutional.

Court membership
- Chief Justice Warren E. Burger Associate Justices William J. Brennan Jr. · Potter Stewart; Byron White · Thurgood Marshall; Harry Blackmun · Lewis F. Powell Jr. William Rehnquist · John P. Stevens

Case opinion
- Majority: Rehnquist, joined by unanimous

Laws applied
- General Allotment Act

Moe v. Confederated Salish & Kootenai Tribes, 425 U.S. 463 (1976), was a United States Supreme Court case in which the Court held that a state tax on personal property owned by tribe members inside reservations and a state sales tax on trade between two tribe members were preempted by the General Allotment Act. Charging non-members sales tax on commerce with tribe members was constitutional, and the state could require the tribe member to collect that tax. The court also said that treating Natives differently in this context would constitute racial discrimination in violation of the Fifth Amendment.
