= Dann v. Johnston =

- Supreme Court of the United States

Argued December 9, 1975 Decided March 31, 1976
- Full case name: Dann, Commissioner of Patents and Trademarks v. Johnston
- Citations: 425 U.S. 219 (more) 96 S. Ct. 1393; 47 L. Ed. 2d 692; 1976 U.S. LEXIS 95; 189 U.S.P.Q. (BNA) 257

Case history
- Prior: In re Johnston, 502 F.2d 765 (C.C.P.A. 1974).

Holding
- Respondent's system is unpatentable on grounds of obviousness.

Court membership
- Chief Justice Warren E. Burger Associate Justices William J. Brennan Jr. · Potter Stewart; Byron White · Thurgood Marshall; Harry Blackmun · Lewis F. Powell Jr. William Rehnquist · John P. Stevens

Case opinion
- Majority: Marshall, joined by Burger, Brennan, Stewart, White, Powell, Rehnquist
- Blackmun and Stevens took no part in the consideration or decision of the case.

Dann v. Johnston, 425 U.S. 219 (1976), is a decision of the United States Supreme Court on the patentability of a claim for a business method patent.

== Background ==
=== The claimed invention ===
The business method at issue in Johnston was claimed as a "machine system for automatic record-keeping of bank checks and deposits." Although the advance was claimed as a system, the invention was a method of creating records of bank checks for expenditures in different categories, such as rent, wages, cost of materials, etc. so that income taxes could more readily be calculated. The system involved such steps as imprinting machine-readable numbers on the individual checks, corresponding to the categories into which the expenditures fell; then the computer would periodically provide a check tabulation, broken down by each category. However, the claims were written in the form of a series of means for performing the steps of the method (in functional language). Accordingly, the claimed subject matter could be argued to be a "machine."

The Patent Office did not accept that argument and rejected the patent application. It said that Johnston wanted the Office to "grant a monopoly ... on a method of conducting the banking business." Johnston then appealed the rejection to the United States Court of Customs and Patent Appeals (CCPA).

=== CCPA decision ===
The CCPA reversed the ruling of the Patent Office (3-2). The majority said that Johnston was claiming a machine, not a process, so that there would be no monopoly on the banking business if other banks used a different machine. The majority also held the Supreme Court's decision in Gottschalk v. Benson inapplicable because that case involved a process patent while this case involved a machine.

Judge Giles Rich dissented on the ground that the Benson case had held a computer program patent ineligible and the machine format was immaterial: " 'Every competent patent draftsman' can draft claims to computer programs either as a process or a machine system." Another dissenting judge found the claimed invention obvious.

The CCPA reversed the Patent Office and the government sought review by the Supreme Court,

== Proceedings in the Supreme Court ==
The government sought review on two questions: Whether the claimed business method was ineligible for patent protection, and whether the subject matter was obvious. The Court granted certiorari on both questions.

The great majority of the government's brief discussed reasons why the claimed invention was not patent eligible. A small portion addressed the obviousness issue.

Justice Thurgood Marshall delivered the unanimous opinion of the seven-member Court. The Court took notice of the prevalence, indeed ubiquity, of computers in the banking industry. That made computerization an obvious approach to the banking activities involved here. More important, the Dirks patent (claiming a computer-operated system for tracking expenses by category within each department of a business organization) was too close in concept to Johnston's system. The Court explained:

[T]he mere existence of differences between the prior art and an invention does not establish the invention's nonobviousness. The gap between the prior art and respondent's system is simply not so great as to render the system nonobvious to one reasonably skilled in the art.

== Subsequent developments ==
Until Bilski v. Kappos and Alice Corp. v. CLS Bank International about four decades later, Johnston was the only business-method patent case that the Supreme Court had so far decided. But the decision turns on obviousness rather than patent eligibility. Despite the fact that most of the pages of the government's brief on the merits were devoted to a discussion of why advances of the type claimed are not eligible to be considered for patentability, the Court declined to reach that question and instead simply found unanimously that the claimed system was obvious.
