= Outrageous government conduct =

Outrageous government conduct is a criminal defense that presupposes the defendant's predisposition to commit the crime but seeks dismissal of the indictment on the ground that the conduct of law enforcement agents was "so outrageous that due process principles would absolutely bar the government from invoking judicial process to obtain a conviction." The defense must prove that law enforcement agents' tactics violated "that 'fundamental fairness, shocking to the universal sense of justice,' mandated by the Due Process Clause of the Fifth Amendment." The outrageous government conduct defense is related to but distinct from the entrapment defense, and is a bar to prosecution which is decided by the judge based on legal theory while entrapment is an affirmative defense which is considered, potentially, by a jury. Additionally, predisposition to commit a crime is irrelevant to the outrageous government conduct defense and can succeed despite evidence of predisposition.

In 2014, U.S. District Judge Otis D. Wright, II, cited outrageous government conduct when dismissing felony criminal charges as a result of an elaborate sting by the U.S. Bureau of Alcohol, Tobacco and Firearms, which he described as an effort to "ensnare chronically unemployed individuals from poverty-ridden areas in its fake drug stash-house robberies."

== See also ==
- Entrapment
