= Alfred Dunhill of London, Inc. v. Republic of Cuba =

- Supreme Court of the United States

Decided May 24, 1976
- Full case name: Alfred Dunhill of London, Inc. v. Republic of Cuba
- Citations: 425 U.S. 682 (more)

Holding
- The Act of State doctrine does not apply to foreign acts that are "purely commercial."

Court membership
- Chief Justice Warren E. Burger Associate Justices William J. Brennan Jr. · Potter Stewart; Byron White · Thurgood Marshall; Harry Blackmun · Lewis F. Powell Jr. William Rehnquist · John P. Stevens

Case opinions
- Majority: White, joined by Burger, Powell, Rehnquist, Stevens
- Concurrence: Powell
- Concurrence: Stevens
- Dissent: Marshall, joined by Brennan, Stewart, Blackmun

Alfred Dunhill of London, Inc. v. Republic of Cuba, 425 U.S. 682 (1976), was a United States Supreme Court case in which the Court held that the Act of State doctrine does not apply to foreign acts that are "purely commercial."
