= Estelle v. Williams =

- Supreme Court of the United States

Argued October 7, 1975 Decided May 3, 1976
- Full case name: W. J. Estelle, Jr., Director, Texas Department of Corrections, Petitioner v. Harry Lee Williams
- Citations: 425 U.S. 501 (more) 96 S. Ct. 1691; 48 L. Ed. 2d 126; 1976 U.S. LEXIS 50

Case history
- Prior: Certiorari to the United States Court of Appeals for the Fifth Circuit

Holding
- Although the State cannot force the accused to stand trial in identifiable prison clothing, the failure to make a timely objection negates the violation of his amendment rights.

Court membership
- Chief Justice Warren E. Burger Associate Justices William J. Brennan Jr. · Potter Stewart; Byron White · Thurgood Marshall; Harry Blackmun · Lewis F. Powell Jr. William Rehnquist · John P. Stevens

Case opinions
- Majority: Burger, joined by Stewart, White, Blackmun, Powell, Rehnquist
- Concurrence: Powell, joined by Stewart
- Dissent: Brennan, joined by Marshall
- Stevens took no part in the consideration or decision of the case.

Laws applied
- U.S. Const. amend. XIV

Estelle v. Williams, 425 U.S. 501 (1976), is a Supreme Court case involving Harry Lee Williams' conviction of assault on his former landlord in Harris County, Texas. While awaiting trial Williams was unable to post bail. He was tried in his prison uniform, and later was found guilty. He sought a writ of habeas corpus saying being tried in a prison uniform violated his Constitutional rights in accordance with the 14th Amendment. The Court of Appeals ruled that the accused does not have to stand trial in identifiable prison clothes and Williams’ right to due process was violated. The Supreme Court reversed, reinstating the conviction, on June 21, 1976.

== Background ==
Section one of the Fourteenth Amendment of the Constitution states “No state shall make or enforce any law which shall abridge the privileges or immunities of citizens of the United States; nor shall any state deprive any person of life, liberty, or property, without due process of law; nor deny to any person within its jurisdiction the equal protection of the laws”. Williams argued that being tried in clearly identifiable prison clothes gave a perception of guilt and therefore undermined his due process right to be presumed innocent until proven guilty.

=== Historical context ===
In the case of Chapman v. California the court ruled that some mistakes and errors could be made that do not require reversal. The defendants in the case invoked the 5th Amendment privilege against self-incrimination and chose not to testify. They were eventually found guilty, but appealed on the basis that their silence created negative publicity which skewed the views of the jurors and undermined their trial. The court agreed that negative media attention was severe, but concluded that this occurrence had no effect on the outcome of the trial, and therefore did not require any modification. However, the court went on to say each case is particular and the stances should be viewed individually. The error would have to be found insignificant to the overall outcome of the trial in order to not be overturned. The court must find the error to be harmless without a doubt in order for the verdict to be considered final. If the appeal happens to be upheld, the defendant can be awarded a retrial.

In Hernandez v. Beto, the accused Hernandez appealed to the court for being tried in prison clothes. Hernandez had not requested to be tried in his civilian clothes and therefore the prosecutor maintains that if there was an error made it was harmless. The District Court referenced Brooks v. Texas (1967) and set the precedent that it is implicitly wrong to try a defendant in prison attire especially when civilian clothing is at hand. The appearance of the prison uniform should not be able to affect the jurors’ decision making, which should be on the hard evidence alone. The judge at Hernandez's trial referenced the decision in Brooks v. Texas and agreed that the situation is applicable to the case at hand. The Court of Appeals, however, found that, as no objection had been made by the defendant to wearing prison clothes, his appeal for retrial would be denied.

In Turner v. Louisiana, the appeal allowed the defendant, Turner, to have the decision reversed and remanded. During Turner's three-day trial for murder, the two deputy sheriffs who had custody of the jury and closely interacted with them during this time were the two main witnesses in his case. The appeal on a writ of habeas corpus was upheld on the basis that Turner's fourteenth amendment rights were violated because of his right to an impartial jury under due process.

=== Central conflict ===
The accused Williams went to his former residence to visit a female friend. While there he got into a confrontation with his former landlord in respect to his failed payments. Williams ended up stabbing the landlord multiple times in the back and abdomen. He was brought up on charges of assault with intent to murder with malice. Williams was unable to post bail and stayed in jail until his court date on October 7, 1975. Williams requested his civilian clothes from a jail guard, but he was denied. He was tried in Harris County, Texas, and the jury found him guilty. After, he sought for a writ of habeas corpus for being forced to stand trial in prison clothing. The District Court denied relief but the Court of Appeals took up his case which was eventually brought in front of the Supreme Court.

== Opinion of the Court ==
The Court ruled that Harry Lee Williams was not denied due process. While the Court concluded that no person could be compelled to stand trial in prison garb without their consent, wearing jail clothes could be a strategy to obtain sympathy from a jury. Accordingly, in the absence of a timely objection, there is no error in having a trial where the defendant appears in prison attire. Justice Stevens took no part in the decision of this particular case.

=== Concurrence ===
Justice Powell said, "'Courts [also] have required an accused to object to being tried in jail garments, just as he must invoke or abandon other rights.' Here, '[t]he record is clear that no objection was made to the trial judge concerning the jail attire either before or at any time during the trial. This omission plainly did not result from any lack of appreciation of the issue, for respondent had raised the question with the jail attendant prior to trial. At trial, defense counsel expressly referred to respondent's attire during voir dire. The trial judge was thus informed that respondent's counsel was fully conscious of the situation'". The Court ruled 6-2 that Williams wearing his prison clothes was considered harmless because of a failure to make a timely objection. Williams' appeal was rejected and a retrial was denied due to his lack of an objection to the judge despite clearly being aware of his appearance. Justices Powell and Stewart agreed that Williams' attorney made "an inexcusable procedural default" or "tactical choice" which allowed for Williams' appearance and therefore was liable on his own accord despite being denied due process.

=== Dissenting opinion ===
The two votes in favor of Williams came from the Justices Marshall and Brennan. Since Williams was in prison garb he gave the appearance of guilt. In Coffin v. United States it is stated “the principle that there is a presumption of innocence in favor of the accused is the undoubted law, axiomatic and elementary, and its enforcement lies at the foundation of the administration of our criminal law”. The appearance of Williams in prison garments corrupted the court process and therefore the error in the court cannot be considered “harmless beyond a doubt.” Justice Marshall said, “the Court could not rest the reversal on a finding that respondent knowingly, voluntarily, and intelligently consented to be tried in such attire, and thus had waived his due process right”. The defendant never conceded to wearing his prison clothes while on trial and a retrial should be awarded because of the violation of his fourteenth amendment rights under due process.

== Historical significance ==
The court's decision upheld the previous decisions regarding defendants wearing prison uniforms without objection in a timely manner. The opinion of the court was that Williams’ due process rights had been violated since he had not consented to wearing the clothing while on trial. In relation to other trials, the justices went on to agree that the waiving of due process rights must be done consciously and intelligently. If the defendant does not knowingly waive his rights then the court must rule the error harmless beyond a doubt or the accused can be awarded a retrial.
