= Adoption Assistance and Child Welfare Act of 1980 =

United States federal law

- Long title: Adoption Assistance and Child Welfare Act of 1980
- Enacted by: the 96th United States Congress
- Effective: June 17, 1980

Citations
- Public law: Pub. L. 96–272

Legislative history
- Introduced in the House by James Corman (D-CA) on April 4, 1979; Committee consideration by Ways and Means; Passed the House on August 2, 1979 (401-2); Passed the Senate on October 29, 1979 (Unanimous consent as amended); Signed into law by President Jimmy Carter on June 17, 1980

The Adoption Assistance and Child Welfare Act of 1980 (AACWA) was enacted by the US Government on June 17, 1980. Its purpose is to establish a program of adoption assistance; strengthen the program of foster care assistance for needy and dependent children; and improve the child welfare, social services, and aid to families with dependent children programs. This act amended titles IV-B and XX of the Social Security Act.

== Title I: Adoption and Foster Care Assistance ==
Establishes a program of, and authorizes appropriations for, adoption and foster care assistance for children under title IV (Aid to Families with Dependent Children and Aid to Child Welfare Services) of the Social Security Act. Requires a State, in order to be eligible for payments under such program, to have a plan approved by the Secretary of Health, Education, and Welfare which provides:

(1) that the State agency responsible for administering the Child Welfare Services program (part B of title IV) shall administer the program established by this Act;

(2) for audit at least every three years of the program established under this Act and under part B;

(3) for certain other administrative, personnel, reporting and benefit standards requirements; and

(4) that reasonable efforts will be made to prevent the removal of a child from his or her home and to make it possible for a child to return home.

Authorizes each State with an approved plan to make foster care maintenance payments covering the cost of food, clothing, shelter, daily supervision, school supplies, a child's personal incidentals, liability insurance with respect to a child, and reasonable travel to the child's home for visitation if: (1) the removal from the home occurred pursuant to a voluntary placement agreement entered into by the child's parent or guardian or was the result of a judicial determination declaring that continuation in the home would be contrary to the child's welfare and that reasonable efforts to keep the child in the home have been made; and (2) the child received Aid to Families with Dependent Children (AFDC) (part A of title IV) during the month in which court proceedings were initiated or was eligible to receive AFDC in that month or within six months prior to that time. Limits the time for which payments may be made pursuant to a voluntary agreement. Directs the Secretary to report on the desirability of continuing such payments.

Limits foster care maintenance payments to children who are in the State-licensed foster family homes of individuals or in licensed nonprofit private child-care institutions.

Requires each State having a plan approved under this Act to make adoption assistance payments, which take into account the circumstances of the adopting parents and the child, to parents who adopt a child who: (1) received AFDC during the month in which court proceedings leading to the removal of the child from home were initiated or was eligible to receive AFDC in that month or within six months prior to that time, or is eligible for payments under title XVI (Supplemental Security Income) of the Act; and (2) is a child with special needs.

Provides coverage for such child up to age 18 under titles XIX (Medicaid) and XX (Grants to States for Services) of the Act. Prohibits payments to parents after the child has reached age 18 and to parents who are no longer legally responsible for support of the child. Defines a child with special needs as a child who: (1) cannot or should not be returned to his or her parent's home; (2) has a special condition making it reasonable to conclude that such child cannot be placed with adoptive parents without providing adoption assistance; and (3) has not been able to be placed without assistance.

Sets forth provisions for determining Federal matching payments to States for foster care maintenance payments and adoption assistance payments based upon the Medicaid (title XIX) formula.

Establishes a ceiling on Federal foster care funding. Permits a State not using its full allotment for foster care to utilize the excess under part B (Child Welfare Services) for Title IV, subject to stated conditions.

Authorizes the Secretary to provide technical assistance to the States in order to develop programs under this Act. Requires each State to submit such statistical reports as the Secretary may require with respect to children for whom payments are made under this Act.

Requires a State, under part A of Title IV, to have in effect a foster care and adoption assistance plan as provided for in this Act. Directs the Secretary to conduct a study of the foster care and adoption assistance programs established by this Act and to submit a report to Congress which shall include recommendations as to whether the program should continue, and if so, any changes which should be made.

Sets forth revised State plan requirements under part B (Child Welfare Services) of Title IV including requiring States to provide that the standards and requirements with respect to child care under Title XX shall apply with respect to day care services under part B of Title IV.

Directs the Secretary to pay from a State's part B allotment an amount equal to 75 percent of the State's expenses for child welfare services.

Requires States, in order to be eligible for certain additional allotments under part B, to: (1) determine the appropriateness of, and necessity for, a child's current foster placement; and (2) implement a statewide information system on children in foster care, a care review system for each child, and a program to help children return to their families.

Defines child welfare services to mean, among other things: (1) protecting and promoting the welfare of all children; (2) preventing the unnecessary separation of children from their families; and (3) placing children in suitable adoptive homes where restoration to the biological family is not possible or appropriate.

Authorizes the Secretary to make payments under part B directly to an Indian tribal organization within a State which has an approved plan for child welfare services.

Provides that amounts appropriated under part B after the enactment of this Act shall be available in the fiscal year following the fiscal year to which the appropriation Act applies.

== Title II: Social Services ==
Amends title XX (Grants to States for Services) of such Act to increase the permanent ceiling on Federal matching funds for State social services programs to a maximum ceiling of $3,300,000,000.

Provides for payment, under title XX, of 100 percent of a State's expenditures for child day care services up to a maximum of $200,000,000 or 8 percent of a State's total allotment under Title XX. Directs that such funds shall be used, to the maximum extent feasible, to increase the employment of welfare recipients and other low-income persons in jobs related to the provision of child day care services.

Limits for fiscal year 1980 and 1981, funding for a State's Title XX training programs to four percent of the State's 1980 title XX allotment or the payment made to a State in 1979 for such expenditures, whichever is higher. Sets forth alternative methods for determining the amount of such limitation. Requires a State, in order to receive such funding in fiscal year 1982 and thereafter. to have a plan approved by the Secretary which, among other things: (1) describes how training needs were assessed; (2) demonstrates the relationship of training activities to title XX; and (3) describes the State's plan to monitor training programs.

Permits expenditures for the provision of emergency shelter, for not in excess of 30 days in any six-month period, provided as a protective service to an adult in danger of physical or mental injury, neglect, maltreatment, or exploitation, effective October 1, 1979.

Directs the Secretary to pay up to $15,000,000 to Puerto Rico, $500,000 to Guam, $500,000 to the Virgin Islands, and $100,000 to the Northern Mariana Islands for social services pursuant to specified sections of such Act.

Makes permanent the reimbursement provisions of title XX related to the costs of hiring welfare recipients in child care jobs. Amends the Internal Revenue Code to permit an employer a 100 percent tax credit for unreimbursed wages paid to welfare recipients hired as child care workers (whose wages are reimbursed under title XX) equal to the lesser of: (1) $6,000 minus the reimbursement; (2) $3,000 (for the first year of employment) or $1,500 (for the second year); or (3) 50 percent (for the first year) or 25 percent (for the second year) of the sum of the unreimbursed wages and the reimbursement.

Extends the provisions of title XX relating to the treatment of alcoholics and drug addicts.

== Title III: Other Social Security Act Provisions ==
Amends title IV, part D (Child Support and Establishment of Paternity) of the Social Security Act to make permanent the authority for 75 percent Federal matching of State costs for providing services to families, not on welfare in assisting them to obtain child support payments from absent parents.

Stipulates, under part A of title IV, that if an individual fails without good cause to report earned income there will be no income disregard.

Permits a State to pay reduced AFDC benefits in the case of an AFDC child living with a relative who is not legally responsible for such child by pro-rating the costs of shelter and utilities for such child among household members.

Amends title XVI (Supplemental Security Income for the Aged, Blind, and Disabled) of such Act to extend until October 1, 1982, the program of Federal payments to States for costs incurred in carrying out a State plan of services for disabled children who receive SSI benefits.

Amends part A (General Provisions) of title XI of such Act to make permanent provisions which provide for a temporary increase in the ceiling on Federal funds to Puerto Rico, the Virgin Islands, and Guam for public assistance payments under specified programs of the Social Security Act.

Requires a State, generally, to file a claim for Federal reimbursement of welfare, Medicaid, and social services program expenditures made under such Act within two years following the expenditures.

Permits a State under part D of such Act to retain 15 percent of any amounts collected as a result of such State's enforcement, on its own behalf, of any child support obligations assigned to it under part A (AFDC) of title IV as a condition of an applicant's eligibility for aid.

Amends titles XVIII (Medicare) and XIX of the Act to provide for the exchange of information between the Secretary and the State agency administering a plan under the Medicare or Medicaid program concerning the suspension of a provider of services under a Medicare or Medicaid plan.

Delays the date certain child support requirements under part D of title IV of the Social Security Act (Child Support and Establishment of Paternity) become effective in the case of certain States.

Exempts recipients of veterans' benefits who are also applicants for or recipients of AFDC, SSI, Old Age and Medical Assistance (Title I of the Social Security Act), Aid to the Blind (Title X of the Act), or Aid to the Permanently and Totally Disabled (title XIV of the Act) from the provision of the Veterans' and Survivors' Pension Improvement Act of 1978 which requires such beneficiaries to elect to receive higher benefits under a new pension program or to continue receiving lower benefits. Permits those individuals who elect the higher benefits to remain eligible for assistance under such programs of the Social Security Act and for Medicaid.

== Major provisions of the act ==
- Required states to make adoption assistance payments, which take into account the circumstances of the adopting parents and the child, to parents who adopt a child who is Aid to Families with Dependent Children (AFDC)-eligible and is a child with special needs.
- Defined a child with special needs as a child who:
  - Cannot be returned to the parent's home
  - Has a special condition such that the child cannot be placed without providing assistance
  - Has not been able to be placed without assistance
- Required, as a condition of receiving federal foster care matching funds, that States make reasonable efforts to prevent removal of the child from the home and return those who have been removed as soon as possible
- Required participating states to establish reunification and preventive programs for all in foster care
- Required the state to place a child in the least restrictive setting and, if the child will benefit, one that is close to the parent's home
- Required the court or agency to review the status of a child in any nonpermanent setting every six months to determine what is in the best interest of the child, with most emphasis placed on returning the child home as soon as possible
- Required the court or administrative body to determine the child's future status, whether it is a return to parents, adoption, or continued foster care, within 18 months after initial placement into foster care
