= List of United States Supreme Court cases, volume 287 =

Supreme Court of the United States
- Interactive map of Supreme Court of the United States
- 38°53′26″N 77°00′16″W
- Established: March 4, 1789; 237 years ago
- Location: Washington, D.C.
- Coordinates: 38°53′26″N 77°00′16″W
- Composition method: Presidential nomination with Senate confirmation
- Authorised by: Constitution of the United States, Art. III, § 1
- Judge term length: life tenure, subject to impeachment and removal
- Number of positions: 9 (by statute)
- Website: supremecourt.gov

This is a list of cases reported in volume 287 of United States Reports, decided by the Supreme Court of the United States in 1932 and 1933.

== Justices of the Supreme Court at the time of volume 287 U.S. ==
The Supreme Court is established by Article III, Section 1 of the Constitution of the United States, which says: "The judicial Power of the United States, shall be vested in one supreme Court . . .". The size of the Court is not specified; the Constitution leaves it to Congress to set the number of justices. Under the Judiciary Act of 1789 Congress originally fixed the number of justices at six (one chief justice and five associate justices). Since 1789 Congress has varied the size of the Court from six to seven, nine, ten, and back to nine justices (always including one chief justice).

When the cases in volume 287 were decided the Court comprised the following nine members:

| Portrait | Justice | Office | Home State | Succeeded | Date confirmed by the Senate (Vote) | Tenure on Supreme Court |
|---|---|---|---|---|---|---|
| | Charles Evans Hughes | Chief Justice | New York | William Howard Taft | February 13, 1930 (52–26) | February 24, 1930 – June 30, 1941 (Retired) |
| | Willis Van Devanter | Associate Justice | Wyoming | Edward Douglass White (as Associate Justice) | December 15, 1910 (Acclamation) | January 3, 1911 – June 2, 1937 (Retired) |
| | James Clark McReynolds | Associate Justice | Tennessee | Horace Harmon Lurton | August 29, 1914 (44–6) | October 12, 1914 – January 31, 1941 (Retired) |
| | Louis Brandeis | Associate Justice | Massachusetts | Joseph Rucker Lamar | June 1, 1916 (47–22) | June 5, 1916 – February 13, 1939 (Retired) |
| | George Sutherland | Associate Justice | Utah | John Hessin Clarke | September 5, 1922 (Acclamation) | October 2, 1922 – January 17, 1938 (Retired) |
| | Pierce Butler | Associate Justice | Minnesota | William R. Day | December 21, 1922 (61–8) | January 2, 1923 – November 16, 1939 (Died) |
| | Harlan F. Stone | Associate Justice | New York | Joseph McKenna | February 5, 1925 (71–6) | March 2, 1925 – July 2, 1941 (Continued as chief justice) |
| | Owen Roberts | Associate Justice | Pennsylvania | Edward Terry Sanford | May 20, 1930 (Acclamation) | June 2, 1930 – July 31, 1945 (Resigned) |
| | Benjamin N. Cardozo | Associate Justice | New York | Oliver Wendell Holmes Jr. | February 24, 1932 (Acclamation) | March 14, 1932 – July 9, 1938 (Died) |

== Notable Cases in 287 U.S. ==
=== Powell v. Alabama ===
Powell v. Alabama, 287 U.S. 45 (1932), is a landmark Supreme Court decision in which the Court reversed the convictions of nine young black men for allegedly raping two white women on a freight train near Scottsboro, Alabama. The majority of the Court reasoned that the right to retain and be represented by a lawyer was fundamental to a fair trial and that at least in some circumstances, the trial judge must inform a defendant of this right. In addition, if the defendant cannot afford a lawyer, the court must appoint one sufficiently far in advance of trial to permit the lawyer to prepare adequately for the trial.

Powell was the first time the Court had reversed a state criminal conviction for a violation of a criminal procedural provision of the United States Bill of Rights. In effect, it held that the Fourteenth Amendment Due Process Clause included at least part of the right to counsel referred to in the Sixth Amendment, making that much of the Bill of Rights binding on the states. Before Powell, the Court had reversed state criminal convictions only for racial discrimination in jury selection — a practice that violated the Equal Protection Clause of the Fourteenth Amendment.

Butler dissented, writing that he would uphold the convictions and death sentences, ignoring the circumstances surrounding the convictions; McReynolds joined the dissent.

=== Sorrells v. United States ===
In Sorrells v. United States, 287 U.S. 435 (1932), the Supreme Court unanimously recognized the entrapment defense. However, while the majority opinion by Chief Justice Charles Evans Hughes located the key to entrapment in the defendant's predisposition or lack thereof to commit the crime, Justice Owen Josephus Roberts' concurring opinion proposed instead that it be rooted in an analysis of the conduct of the law enforcement agents making the arrest. Although the Court has stuck with the predisposition analysis, the dispute has hung over entrapment jurisprudence ever since.

== Federal court system ==
Under the Judiciary Act of 1789 the federal court structure at the time comprised District Courts, which had general trial jurisdiction; Circuit Courts, which had mixed trial and appellate (from the US District Courts) jurisdiction; and the United States Supreme Court, which had appellate jurisdiction over the federal District and Circuit courts—and for certain issues over state courts. The Supreme Court also had limited original jurisdiction (i.e., in which cases could be filed directly with the Supreme Court without first having been heard by a lower federal or state court). There were one or more federal District Courts and/or Circuit Courts in each state, territory, or other geographical region.

The Judiciary Act of 1891 created the United States Courts of Appeals and reassigned the jurisdiction of most routine appeals from the district and circuit courts to these appellate courts. The Act created nine new courts that were originally known as the "United States Circuit Courts of Appeals." The new courts had jurisdiction over most appeals of lower court decisions. The Supreme Court could review either legal issues that a court of appeals certified or decisions of court of appeals by writ of certiorari. On January 1, 1912, the effective date of the Judicial Code of 1911, the old Circuit Courts were abolished, with their remaining trial court jurisdiction transferred to the U.S. District Courts.

== List of cases in volume 287 U.S. ==
| Case name | Citation | Opinion of the Court | Vote | Concurring opinion or statement | Dissenting opinion or statement | Procedural jurisdiction | Result |
|---|---|---|---|---|---|---|---|
| Wood, Secretary of State of Mississippi v. Broom | 287 U.S. 1 (1932) | Hughes | 9–0 | Brandeis, Stone, Roberts, and Cardozo (brief joint statement) | none | appeal from the United States District Court for the Southern District of Mississippi (S.D. Miss.) | decree reversed, and cause remanded |
| Stewart Dry Goods Company v. Lewis | 287 U.S. 9 (1932) | per curiam | 9–0 | none | none | appeal from the United States District Court for the Western District of Kentucky (W.D. Ky.) | decrees reversed, and causes remanded |
| New York Central Securities Corporation v. United States | 287 U.S. 12 (1932) | Hughes | 9–0 | none | none | appeal from the United States District Court for the Southern District of New York (S.D.N.Y.) | decree affirmed |
| Mosher v. City of Phoenix | 287 U.S. 29 (1932) | Hughes | 9–0 | none | none | certiorari to the United States Court of Appeals for the Ninth Circuit (9th Cir.) | decrees reversed |
| Gulf States Steel Company v. United States | 287 U.S. 32 (1932) | McReynolds | 9–0 | none | none | certiorari to the United States Court of Appeals for the Fifth Circuit (5th Cir.) | judgment affirmed |
| Powell v. Alabama | 287 U.S. 45 (1932) | Sutherland | 7–2 | none | Butler (opinion; with which McReynolds concurred) | certiorari to the Alabama Supreme Court (Ala.) | judgments reversed |
| United States v. Shreveport Grain and Elevator Company | 287 U.S. 77 (1932) | Sutherland | 9–0 | Brandeis, Stone, and Cardozo (joint short statement) | none | appeal from the United States District Court for the Western District of Louisiana (W.D. La.) | judgment reversed |
| Seaboard Air Line Railroad Company v. Watson | 287 U.S. 86 (1932) | Butler | 8-0[a] | none | none | appeal from the Florida Supreme Court (Fla.) | appeal dismissed |
| Schoenthal v. Irving Trust Company, Trustee in Bankruptcy | 287 U.S. 92 (1932) | Butler | 9–0 | none | none | certiorari to the United States Court of Appeals for the Second Circuit (2d Cir.) | judgment reversed |
| Washington Fidelity National Insurance Company v. Burton | 287 U.S. 97 (1932) | Butler | 7–2 | none | Stone (opinion; with which Brandeis concurred) | certiorari to the United States Court of Appeals for the District of Columbia (D.C. Cir.) | judgment reversed |
| Burnet, Commissioner of Internal Revenue v. Harmel | 287 U.S. 103 (1932) | Stone | 9–0 | none | none | certiorari to the United States Court of Appeals for the Fifth Circuit (5th Cir.) | judgment reversed |
| Gebardi v. United States | 287 U.S. 112 (1932) | Stone | 9–0 | Cardozo (without opinion) | none | certiorari to the United States Court of Appeals for the Seventh Circuit (7th Cir.) | judgment reversed |
| Grau v. United States | 287 U.S. 124 (1932) | Roberts | 7–2 | none | Stone and Cardozo (without opinions) | certiorari to the United States Court of Appeals for the Sixth Circuit (6th Cir.) | judgment reversed |
| United States ex rel. Stapf v. Corsi, Commissioner of Immigration | 287 U.S. 129 (1932) | Roberts | 9–0 | none | none | certiorari to the United States Court of Appeals for the Second Circuit (2d Cir.) | judgment affirmed |
| Norfolk and Western Railroad Company v. United States | 287 U.S. 134 (1932) | Roberts | 8-0[b] | none | none | appeal from the United States District Court for the Western District of Virginia (W.D. Va.) | judgment affirmed |
| United States v. Great Northern Railroad Company | 287 U.S. 144 (1932) | Cardozo | 9–0 | none | none | certiorari to the United States Court of Appeals for the Eighth Circuit (8th Cir.) | judgment affirmed |
| American Surety Company v. Baldwin | 287 U.S. 156 (1932) | Brandeis | 9–0 | none | none | certiorari to the Idaho Supreme Court (Idaho) | certiorari dismissed in one case; decree reversed in one case |
| Brooklyn Eastern District Terminal v. United States | 287 U.S. 170 (1932) | Cardozo | 9–0 | none | none | certiorari to the United States Court of Appeals for the Second Circuit (2d Cir.) | judgment affirmed |
| Interstate Commerce Commission v. New York, New Haven and Hartford Railroad Company | 287 U.S. 178 (1932) | Cardozo | 4-3[b][c] | none | VanDevanter, McReynolds, and Sutherland (joint short statement) | certiorari to the United States Court of Appeals for the District of Columbia (D.C. Cir.) | judgment reversed |
| Sgro v. United States | 287 U.S. 206 (1932) | Hughes | 7–2 | McReynolds (opinion) | Stone and Cardozo (joint short statement) | certiorari to the United States Court of Appeals for the Second Circuit (2d Cir.) | judgment reversed |
| Burns v. United States | 287 U.S. 216 (1932) | Hughes | 9–0 | none | none | certiorari to the United States Court of Appeals for the Ninth Circuit (9th Cir.) | judgment affirmed |
| Gwinn v. Commissioner of Internal Revenue | 287 U.S. 224 (1932) | McReynolds | 9–0 | none | none | certiorari to the United States Court of Appeals for the Ninth Circuit (9th Cir.) | judgment affirmed |
| Alton Railroad Company v. United States | 287 U.S. 229 (1932) | Brandeis | 9–0 | none | none | appeal from the United States District Court for the Northern District of Illinois (N.D. Ill.) | decree reversed, and cause remanded |
| Ex parte United States | 287 U.S. 241 (1932) | Sutherland | 9–0 | none | none | petition for mandamus to the United States District Court for the Eastern District of Pennsylvania (E.D. Pa.) | petition for mandamus granted |
| Stephenson v. Binford | 287 U.S. 251 (1932) | Sutherland | 8–1 | none | Butler (without opinion) | appeal from the United States District Court for the Southern District of Texas (S.D. Tex.) | decree affirmed |
| Bainbridge v. Merchants and Miners Transportation Company | 287 U.S. 278 (1932) | Sutherland | 9–0 | none | none | certiorari to the Pennsylvania Supreme Court (Pa.) | judgment reversed, and cause remanded |
| Advance-Rumely Thresher Company v. Jackson | 287 U.S. 283 (1932) | Butler | 9–0 | Stone and Cardozo (without opinions) | none | appeal from the North Dakota Supreme Court (N.D.) | judgment affirmed |
| Sun Oil Company v. Dalzell Towing Company, Inc. | 287 U.S. 291 (1932) | Butler | 9–0 | none | none | certiorari to the United States Court of Appeals for the Second Circuit (2d Cir.) | decree affirmed |
| Detroit International Bridge Company v. Corporation Tax Appeal Board of Michigan | 287 U.S. 295 (1932) | Butler | 9–0 | none | none | appeal from the Michigan Supreme Court (Mich.) | judgment affirmed |
| Murphy Oil Company v. Burnet, Commissioner of Internal Revenue | 287 U.S. 299 (1932) | Stone | 9–0 | none | none | certiorari to the United States Court of Appeals for the Ninth Circuit (9th Cir.) | judgment affirmed |
| Bankers Pocahontas Coal Company v. Burnet, Commissioner of Internal Revenue | 287 U.S. 308 (1932) | Stone | 9–0 | none | none | certiorari to the United States Court of Appeals for the Fourth Circuit (4th Cir.) | judgment affirmed |
| Strother v. Burnet, Commissioner of Internal Revenue | 287 U.S. 314 (1932) | Stone | 9–0 | none | none | certiorari to the United States Court of Appeals for the Fourth Circuit (4th Cir.) | judgment affirmed |
| Reichelderfer v. Quinn | 287 U.S. 315 (1932) | Stone | 9–0 | none | none | certiorari to the United States Court of Appeals for the District of Columbia (D.C. Cir.) | judgment reversed |
| Elting, Collector of Customs v. North German Lloyd | 287 U.S. 324 (1932) | Stone | 9–0 | none | none | certiorari to the United States Court of Appeals for the Second Circuit (2d Cir.) | judgment reversed |
| Lloyd Sabaudo Societa Anonima per Azioni v. Elting, Collector of Customs | 287 U.S. 329 (1932) | Stone | 9–0 | none | none | certiorari to the United States Court of Appeals for the Second Circuit (2d Cir.) | judgment reversed in part, affirmed in part |
| Costanzo v. Tillinghast, Commissioner of Immigration | 287 U.S. 341 (1932) | Roberts | 9–0 | none | none | certiorari to the United States Court of Appeals for the First Circuit (1st Cir.) | judgment affirmed |
| Porter v. Investment Syndicate | 287 U.S. 346 (1932) | Roberts | 9–0 | none | none | appeal from the United States District Court for the District of Montana (D. Mont.) (on rehearing) | prior judgment stands |
| Shapiro v. Wilgus | 287 U.S. 348 (1932) | Cardozo | 9–0 | none | none | certiorari to the United States Court of Appeals for the Third Circuit (3d Cir.) | decree reversed, and cause remanded |
| Great Northern Railroad Company v. Sunburst Oil and Refining Company | 287 U.S. 358 (1932) | Cardozo | 9–0 | none | none | certiorari to the Montana Supreme Court (Mont.) | judgment affirmed |
| Cortes v. Baltimore Insular Line, Inc. | 287 U.S. 367 (1932) | Cardozo | 9–0 | none | none | certiorari to the United States Court of Appeals for the Second Circuit (2d Cir.) | judgment reversed, and cause remanded |
| Sterling, Governor of Texas v. Constantin | 287 U.S. 378 (1932) | Hughes | 9–0 | none | none | appeal from the United States District Court for the Eastern District of Texas (E.D. Tex.) | judgment affirmed |
| Dalton v. Bowers | 287 U.S. 404 (1932) | McReynolds | 9–0 | none | none | certiorari to the United States Court of Appeals for the Second Circuit (2d Cir.) | judgment affirmed |
| Burnet, Commissioner of Internal Revenue v. Clark | 287 U.S. 410 (1932) | McReynolds | 9–0 | none | none | certiorari to the United States Court of Appeals for the District of Columbia (D.C. Cir.) | judgment reversed |
| Burnet, Commissioner of Internal Revenue v. Commonwealth Improvement Company | 287 U.S. 415 (1932) | McReynolds | 9–0 | none | none | certiorari to the United States Court of Appeals for the Third Circuit (3d Cir.) | judgement reversed |
| Earle and Stoddart, Inc. v. Ellerman's Wilson Line, Ltd. | 287 U.S. 420 (1932) | Brandeis | 9–0 | none | none | certiorari to the United States Court of Appeals for the Second Circuit (2d Cir.) | decree affirmed |
| General Electric Company v. Marvel Rare Metals Company | 287 U.S. 430 (1932) | Butler | 9–0 | none | none | certiorari to the United States Court of Appeals for the Sixth Circuit (6th Cir.) | judgment affirmed |
| Sorrells v. United States | 287 U.S. 435 (1932) | Hughes | 8–1 | Roberts (opinion; with which Brandeis and Stone concurred) | McReynolds (without opinion) | certiorari to the United States Court of Appeals for the Fourth Circuit (4th Cir.) | judgment reversed, and cause remanded |
| Johnson and Higgins of California v. United States | 287 U.S. 459 (1932) | Hughes | 9–0 | none | none | certiorari to the United States Court of Claims (Ct. Cl.) | judgment reversed |
| Pinellas Ice and Cold Storage Company v. Commissioner of Internal Revenue | 287 U.S. 462 (1933) | McReynolds | 9–0 | none | none | certiorari to the United States Court of Appeals for the Fifth Circuit (5th Cir.) | judgment affirmed |
| United States v. Arzner | 287 U.S. 470 (1933) | McReynolds | 9–0 | none | none | certiorari to the United States Court of Appeals for the Ninth Circuit (9th Cir.) | judgment affirmed |
| Fairmont Glass Works v. Cub Fork Coal Company | 287 U.S. 474 (1933) | Brandeis | 7–2 | none | Stone and Cardozo (joint opinion) | certiorari to the United States Court of Appeals for the Seventh Circuit (7th Cir.) | judgment reversed |
| Wabash Valley Electric Company v. Young | 287 U.S. 488 (1933) | Sutherland | 9–0 | none | none | appeal from the United States District Court for the Southern District of Indiana (S.D. Ind.) | decree affirmed |
| Atlantic Coast Line Railroad Company v. Ford | 287 U.S. 502 (1933) | Sutherland | 9–0 | none | none | appeal from the South Carolina Supreme Court (S.C.) | judgment affirmed |
| Guaranty Trust Company v. Blodgett, Tax Commissioner | 287 U.S. 509 (1933) | Sutherland | 9–0 | none | none | appeal from the Superior Court of Fairfield County, Connecticut (Fairfield Cnty. Super. Ct.) | judgment affirmed |
| American Surety Company of New York v. Marotta | 287 U.S. 513 (1933) | Butler | 9–0 | none | none | certiorari to the United States Court of Appeals for the First Circuit (1st Cir.) | judgment reversed, and cause remanded |
| Pobreslo v. Joseph M. Boyd Company | 287 U.S. 518 (1933) | Butler | 9–0 | none | none | appeal from the Wisconsin Supreme Court (Wis.) | judgment affirmed |
| Johnson v. Star | 287 U.S. 527 (1933) | Butler | 9–0 | none | none | appeal from the Texas Supreme Court (Tex.) | judgment affirmed |
| Aetna Life Insurance Company v. Moses | 287 U.S. 530 (1933) | Stone | 9–0 | none | none | certiorari to the United States Court of Appeals for the District of Columbia (D.C. Cir.) | judgment reversed, and cause remanded |
| Burnet, Commissioner of Internal Revenue v. Aluminum Goods Manufacturing Company | 287 U.S. 544 (1933) | Stone | 9–0 | none | none | certiorari to the United States Court of Appeals for the Seventh Circuit (7th Cir.) | judgment affirmed |
| Palmer v. Bender | 287 U.S. 551 (1933) | Stone | 9–0 | none | none | certiorari to the United States Court of Appeals for the Fifth Circuit (5th Cir.) | judgment reversed |

[a] Brandeis took no part in the case
[b] Butler took no part in the case
[c] Hughes took no part in the case
