= Connecticut National Bank v. Germain =

- Supreme Court of the United States

Argued January 21, 1992 Decided March 9, 1992
- Full case name: Connecticut National Bank, Petitioner v. Thomas M. Germain, Trustee for the Estate of O'Sullivan's Fuel Oil Co., Inc.
- Citations: 503 U.S. 249 (more) 112 S. Ct. 1146; 117 L. Ed. 2d 391; 1992 U.S. LEXIS 1531; 60 U.S.L.W. 4222; Bankr. L. Rep. (CCH) ¶ 78,009; 26 Collier Bankr. Cas. 2d (MB) 175; 22 Bankr. Ct. Dec. 1130; 92 Cal. Daily Op. Service 1971; 92 Daily Journal DAR 3080; 6 Fla. L. Weekly Fed. S 57

Case history
- Prior: 926 F.2d 191 (2d Cir. 1991)

Court membership
- Chief Justice William Rehnquist Associate Justices Byron White · Harry Blackmun; John P. Stevens · Sandra Day O'Connor; Antonin Scalia · Anthony Kennedy; David Souter · Clarence Thomas

Case opinions
- Majority: Thomas, joined by Rehnquist, Scalia, Kennedy, Souter
- Concurrence: Stevens
- Concurrence: O'Connor, joined by White, Blackmun

Laws applied
- 28 U.S.C. § 158(d), 28 U.S.C. § 1292

Connecticut National Bank v. Germain, 503 U.S. 249 (1992), was a United States Supreme Court case holding that a court of appeals may review an interlocutory order issued by a district court acting in its appellate capacity in a bankruptcy matter, when such review is authorized under 28 U.S.C. § 1292. The Court unanimously agreed on the statutory interpretation outcome but split over whether it was proper to consult legislative history in reaching that conclusion.

== Background ==
In the federal system, bankruptcy cases and related lawsuits are first heard in the United States Bankruptcy Court for the relevant judicial district. Appeals from bankruptcy court decisions typically go to the United States District Court for that district. Under Section 158(d) of title 28 of the United States Code, appeals from final judgments of the district courts in bankruptcy cases may be taken to the Court of Appeals for the circuit. However, § 158(d) does not address interlocutory—or non-final—district court decisions in bankruptcy cases.

Another statute, 28 U.S.C. § 1292, governs appeals from district courts to courts of appeals when the district court’s order is interlocutory rather than final. Section 1292 applies to all federal civil cases, whereas § 158 governs bankruptcy-specific appeals. Ordinarily, under 28 U.S.C. § 1291, only final judgments of district courts are appealable. Section 1292 provides limited exceptions, allowing interlocutory appeals in certain circumstances—such as orders involving injunctions or cases where both courts grant permission to appeal.

The underlying Connecticut bankruptcy case involved a dispute over whether the parties were entitled to a jury trial. The bankruptcy court granted a jury trial, and the district court affirmed that decision on appeal. Connecticut National Bank appealed the interlocutory order to the United States Court of Appeals for the Second Circuit, which dismissed for lack of jurisdiction.

The Supreme Court granted certiorari to decide whether § 1292 permits appellate review of a district court’s interlocutory order in a bankruptcy appeal. Janet C. Hall, later a federal judge in Connecticut, argued for the petitioner. Bankruptcy trustee Thomas M. Germain represented himself as respondent.

== Opinion of the Court ==
Justice Clarence Thomas wrote the Court's opinion, joined by Chief Justice William Rehnquist and Justices Antonin Scalia, Anthony Kennedy, and David Souter. In his opinion, Justice Thomas reviewed the language of the different statutory provisions, concluding that while there was some overlap between the provisions of Section 158 and Sections 1291 and 1292, each section also covers some cases that the other would not. Thomas observed that "[r]edundancies across statutes are not unusual events in drafting, and so long as there is no "positive repugnancy" between two laws ... a court must give effect to both."

Thomas argued the statutes’ text was unambiguous and that consulting legislative history was unnecessary. The opinion concluded that "[t]here is no reason to infer from either § 1292 or § 158(d) that Congress meant to limit appellate review of interlocutory orders in bankruptcy proceedings. So long as a party to a proceeding or case in bankruptcy meets the conditions imposed by § 1292, a court of appeals may rely on that statute as a basis for jurisdiction."

== Opinions concurring in the judgment ==
Justices John Paul Stevens and Sandra Day O'Connor each filed opinions concurring in the judgment, agreeing with the result but not the majority’s reasoning. Justices Byron R. White and Harry Blackmun joined O'Connor's concurrence.

Justice Stevens wrote that “whenever there is some uncertainty about the meaning of a statute, it is prudent to examine its legislative history.” He found nothing in § 158(d)’s legislative history suggesting that Congress intended it to supersede §§ 1291 or 1292. Stevens stated that he agreed with the Court's decision for this reason, in addition to the majority's textual analysis.

Justice O’Connor, in a brief concurrence, acknowledged that the ruling created some redundancy among the provisions of Title 28. She reasoned that it was “far more likely that Congress inadvertently created a redundancy than that Congress intended to withdraw appellate jurisdiction over interlocutory bankruptcy appeals,” and she joined the Court’s judgment on that basis.
