= Jacobson v. United States =

1992 US Supreme Court case on entrapment

- Supreme Court of the United States

Argued November 6, 1991 Decided April 6, 1992
- Full case name: Keith Jacobson, Petitioner v. United States
- Citations: 503 U.S. 540 (more) 112 S. Ct. 1535; 118 L. Ed. 2d 174; 1992 U.S. LEXIS 2117; 60 U.S.L.W. 4307; 92 Cal. Daily Op. Service 2901; 92 Daily Journal DAR 4584; 6 Fla. L. Weekly Fed. S 166

Case history
- Prior: Defendant convicted, United States District Court for the District of Nebraska; Conviction reversed United States Court of Appeals for the Eighth Circuit, 893 F.2d 999 (8th Cir. 1990); Conviction affirmed, United States Court of Appeals for the Eighth Circuit, 916 F.2d 467 (8th Cir. 1990) (en banc); certiorari granted, 499 U.S. 974 (1991).
- Subsequent: Conviction reversed

Holding
- The government must prove beyond a reasonable doubt that a defendant was predisposed to commit a crime prior to any contact with government agents in order to overcome entrapment defense; defendant's prior commission of acts later prohibited that were legal at the time did not establish evidence of predisposition sufficient to overcome entrapment defense where no evidence existed of commission of crimes independent of solicitation to do so by agents.

Court membership
- Chief Justice William Rehnquist Associate Justices Byron White · Harry Blackmun; John P. Stevens · Sandra Day O'Connor; Antonin Scalia · Anthony Kennedy; David Souter · Clarence Thomas

Case opinions
- Majority: White, joined by Blackmun, Stevens, Souter, Thomas
- Dissent: O'Connor, joined by Rehnquist, Kennedy; Scalia (except part II)

Laws applied
- Entrapment case law

Jacobson v. United States, 503 U.S. 540 (1992), is a case decided by the United States Supreme Court regarding the criminal procedure topic of entrapment. A narrowly divided court overturned the conviction of a Nebraska man for receiving child sexual abuse material through the mail, ruling that postal inspectors had implanted a desire to do so through repeated written entreaties.

It was the first time the court had considered an entrapment case other than regarding controlled-substance enforcement. By relying exclusively on whether the defendant had a predisposition to commit the crime, the court seemed to have finally resolved a lingering issue in its previous decisions on the subject.

The decision was considered as a rare triumph for defendants before a conservative court that frequently sided with prosecutors. Guidelines for federal law enforcement agents were changed in its wake, and it was described as having brought entrapment "back from the dead".

== Background of the case ==
=== U.S. anti-child pornography legislation and early cases ===
Until the late 1970s, there were no federal laws specifically addressing the production, distribution or possession of child sexual abuse material (CSAM), and it was readily available to those who sought it. While some was imported from European countries where it was produced, there was also a domestic industry.

Media exposés and popular outrage caused Congress to pass by unanimous vote the Protection of Children Against Sexual Exploitation Act of 1977 (SEOC), which criminalized the production and sale of child pornography. This act was signed into law by President Jimmy Carter on February 6, 1978. The legislation was supported by a unanimous decision of the Supreme Court in New York v. Ferber, 458 U.S. 747 (1982), that images of children need not meet legal definitions of obscenity to be prohibited by the government, since the state's interest in protecting children from harm trumped First Amendment rights in this instance.

Soon thereafter, an update to the SEOC Act, the Child Protection Act of 1984, made it illegal to purchase pornographic materials depicting minors through the mail, or possess them, on the grounds that it encouraged child sexual abuse. While popular with voters, civil liberties advocates warned that the expanded scope of these laws could result in prosecutions of entirely innocent people who had little or nothing to do with the child-porn industry, such as parents taking photos or videos of their children in the nude. Nevertheless, investigators forged ahead and had, by the mid-1980s, ended almost all domestic child-porn production.

=== Investigation and arrest of Keith Jacobson ===
In January 1985 inspectors for the United States Postal Service (USPS) in the Great Plains states began "Project Looking Glass", a sting operation under the newly enacted Child Protection Act of 1984, which made it illegal to send pictures of nude minors through the mail, even for noncommercial purposes (previously, only those who intended to resell them could be prosecuted). Ray Mack, the inspector in charge, meant it to be primarily an intelligence-gathering operation, a way to keep tabs on producers and distributors. It sent mail to those it had known to have ordered such materials while they were legal. Among them were Keith Jacobson, a bachelor 56-year-old U.S. Army retiree turned farmer living with his elderly parents in Newman Grove, Nebraska, who would later describe himself as bisexual although he said he had never had relations with men. Jacobson had, the previous year, ordered two magazines entitled Bare Boys I and Bare Boys II from Electric Moon, an adult bookstore in San Diego, California, that had been raided and shut down.

USPS investigators decided to send him a letter from a fictitious organization, the "American Hedonist Society", which supposedly sought to lobby for "the right to read what we desire, the right to discuss similar interests with those who share our philosophy, and finally that we have the right to seek pleasure without restrictions being placed on us by outdated puritan morality." Included was a questionnaire attempting to gauge the respondent's interest in various paraphilias, including pedophilia and ephebophilia. Jacobson indicated an "above average" interest in the latter, especially between males, but also stated he was opposed to the former. The USPS decided he was not a promising target and left him alone.

But some time later, Calvin Comfort, a "prohibited mailing specialist" for the region, found Jacobson's name in another file, and the government decided to try again, this time as part of an operation aimed at purchasers. In May 1986, they sent him mail from another fictitious organization, "Midlands Data Research", which was for those who "believe in the joys of sex and the complete awareness of those lusty and youthful lads and lasses of the neophite [sic] age". Jacobson confessed to them that he was "interested in teenage sexuality", asked for more information and that his name be kept confidential. This resulted in Jacobson getting mail from the "Heartland Institute for a New Tomorrow" (HINT), "an organization founded to protect and promote sexual freedom and freedom of choice. We believe that arbitrarily imposed legislative sanctions restricting your sexual freedom should be rescinded through the legislative process." Jacobson seemed to sympathize, writing in response that sexual freedom and freedom of the press were being attacked by "right-wing fundamentalists".

Along with a thank you note from "Jean Daniels" of HINT also came a supposed list of others in the area with similar interests as possible pen pals. But Jacobson never wrote to any of them. So Comfort, under the pseudonym "Carl Long", wrote back using a technique termed "mirroring", claiming to have interests calculated to be similar to those believed held by Jacobson, and specifically, to be equally interested in depictions of sex acts between young boys. Jacobson said he, too, liked "good looking young guys (in their late teens and early 20s) doing their thing together". Neither Jacobson nor Comfort made any more explicit reference to pornographic materials and Jacobson stopped writing back after two letters. With no evidence that he had ever watched or possessed any CSAM, the USPS again dropped its efforts against him.

Those were renewed in March 1987 when the United States Customs Service sent similar exploratory material, supposedly from Canada, to Jacobson and others on the USPS's list, and he responded, placing an order that was never filled. A catalog from a "Far Eastern Trading Company" was sent instead, along with other written material bemoaning the infringement of sexual freedoms. This time Jacobson ordered a publication named Boys Who Love Boys, which the catalog said featured "11 and 14 year old boys" who "get it on in every way imaginable. Oral, anal and heavy masturbation. If you love boys," it further read, "you will be delighted with this".

On June 16, 1987, Jacobson received a card in his mail telling him to go to the post office and pick up the envelope that supposedly contained Boys Who Love Boys. Comfort observed him doing so and got a search warrant for his home on that basis. He was arrested soon thereafter, 26 months after the postal inspectors had first contacted him.

== Lower court proceedings ==
=== Criminal trial ===
Jacobson was indicted on one count of knowingly receiving through the mails sexually explicit material depicting a minor in September. At trial in federal court, his attorney, George H. Moyer, noted his exemplary military service record, including a Bronze Star, service in Korea and Vietnam War and lack of a civilian criminal record beyond a drunken-driving conviction in 1958. He raised the entrapment defense.

Jacobson testified that he had been "shocked and surprised" by the contents of the Bare Boys collections when he received them, as he had not expected the photos to depict very young boys: "I thought these were a nudist type publication. Many of the pictures were out in a rural or outdoor setting. There was – I didn't draw any sexual connotation or connection with that".

The jury convicted him in April 1988. He was sentenced to three years imprisonment, suspended to two years' probation and 250 hours of community service, which he discharged by painting a school bus and working at a library. He had to sell his share of the family farm to his sister to pay his legal bills, and was dismissed from his job driving a school bus in Newman Grove even though there was no evidence he had ever approached children sexually. He lowered his profile, often driving to more distant communities to run routine errands. Nonetheless, his hometown sympathized with him. "Any of us could be caught up in such a sting," the Newman Grove local newspaper editorialized.

=== Appeals ===
A panel of three appellate judges heard the case for the Eighth Circuit Court of Appeals. On January 12, 1990, Senior Judge Gerald Heaney and Chief Judge Donald Lay overturned the conviction on the grounds that the government had insufficient grounds to believe that Jacobson was likely to purchase the material it was offering to him. Judge George G. Fagg said in dissent that his colleagues had "declared war on the government's power to initiate undercover investigations" and that reasonable suspicion need not be present for such operations to occur.

He would be successful after federal prosecutors appealed for an en banc rehearing by the entire court, reiterating that point for an eight-judge majority and saying that unless Jacobson could demonstrate that a specifically protected right had been violated by the investigation, the conviction should stand. The majority also rejected the entrapment defense, arguing that the postal investigators had merely provided Jacobson with opportunities to purchase CSAM and not sought to affect his predisposition (an important element in entrapment under U.S. law) to do so in any way.

Lay and Heaney were the sole dissenters, and wrote separate opinions based upon two different grounds. The former argued that Jacobson had not in fact shown "predisposition" toward breaking the law throughout his life, since the only known prior purchases and basis for belief by prosecutors, were purchases he had made at a time this was a legal act; Lay therefore concluded that without evidence of prior disposition to violate the law in this way, he had been entrapped. The latter's dissent was similar to the original panel opinion, arguing that the government had no reasonable belief that Jacobson would purchase CSAM. He also termed investigative tactics sufficiently outrageous to justify reversal: "In my view, the government's investigation and prosecution of Jacobson amount to the deliberate manufacture of a crime that would never have occurred but for the Postal Service's overzealous efforts to create it".

== Supreme Court case ==
=== Certiorari petition ===
John Paul Stevens, Associate Justice of the Supreme Court supposedly picked Jacobson's case out of a pile of "hopeless" certiorari petitions. After reading it, Justice Byron White made an argument moving and persuasive enough that Justices Harry Blackmun, Thurgood Marshall, and Stevens changed their minds and agreed to accept it. Regardless of how certiorari was granted, arguments before the Court were limited by the grant to the single issue in question: whether, as a matter of law, Jacobson had been entrapped.

=== Entrapment in federal prosecutions ===
The entrapment defense at the federal level exists entirely in case law. Federal courts first recognized entrapment in Woo Wai v. United States, 223 F 412 (9th Circuit 1915), and the Supreme Court followed suit in Sorrells v. United States, 287 U.S. 435 (1932).

The Sorrells court grounded the entrapment defense in what has since been termed the "subjective" test, in which the prosecution must overcome it by showing the defendant had a "predisposition" to commit the crime in any event. In Sherman v. United States, 356 U.S. 369 (1958), Felix Frankfurter, in a concurrence, had argued instead for an "objective" standard, which emphasizes instead the behavior of the law enforcement personnel involved and whether the crime would have occurred without their involvement, a call repeated by other justices in later decisions. While the majority of states have chosen to use the objective method, the Supreme Court has retained the former.

=== Briefings and pre-hearing public awareness ===
Jacobson's case attracted some national media attention. Civil liberties advocates including the ACLU supported him, worried about what they considered as dangerous growth of government police powers during the administrations of Reagan and Bush, when law enforcement were alleged to have cracked down on drugs as well as pornography distribution at the behest of the Religious Right. Operation Looking Glass, the USPS claimed, had netted 147 convictions, but only 35 where evidence was found that the offenders had either been involved in producing CSAM or molested children. Critics claimed that the government was exaggerating the problem at best and contributing to it at worst, possibly by introducing some consumers to material they might never have developed a preference for otherwise.

It was the subject of a 60 Minutes segment, in which Jacobson told Mike Wallace, after pausing for several seconds and looking downward, that he broke down and ordered Boys Who Love Boys because he wanted to see just what it was that he was being so heavily solicited to buy. A postal inspector also admitted to the show that since it had successfully put most CSAM producers out of business, it was now going after consumers with material of its own.

Interested parties on both sides filed amici. A group of conservative Republicans in both houses of Congress, including Newt Gingrich, Dick Armey, Henry Hyde and Rick Santorum, and the National Center for Missing and Exploited Children both argued for affirming the conviction, indicating the invaluable nature of undercover investigations in fighting CSAM, worrying that requiring reasonable suspicion beforehand could make such operations impossible. Americans for Effective Law Enforcement said there had been no entrapment and that reasonable suspicion was not required before starting investigations such as Looking Glass. The American Civil Liberties Union, its Nebraska chapter and the National Association of Criminal Defense Lawyers advocated for Jacobson.

=== Arguments ===
Moyer, who had never argued before the Supreme Court, continued to represent Jacobson (who was in the audience). In his brief and at oral argument, he said that a mere stated interest in sex among young men did not rise to a level of proving predisposition, that the government should have had evidence in hand that Jacobson was actually willing to violate the law to do so. (Kenneth Starr, then Solicitor General, had maintained in the government's brief opposing certiorari that his prior purchase of the Bare Boys magazines was all the proof it needed, even if the action were legal at the time.) Pressed on other undercover investigative techniques, he admitted that a government-run pawn shop would be a permissible way to apprehend thieves despite a lack of evidence of predisposition because the crimes might well have occurred prior to any contact with the government or its operatives.

During oral argument, Justice Antonin Scalia responded to this by suggesting that some interests a person might express, such as recreational drugs, signified a willingness to violate social norms regardless of whether the behavior was illegal or not. Paul Larkin, who appeared for the government, had to admit to that there was no case law on entrapment where something that had previously been permitted was now prohibited. At one point, trying to argue that Jacobson did not have access to the defense of entrapment by estoppel (where the government persuades an actor that it is legal to do something, only to prosecute them for it), Scalia told Larkin he'd lost him.

=== Decision ===
By a 5–4 margin, the justices reversed the conviction, agreeing that Jacobson had been entrapped, on April 6, 1992. It has since been reported that this was one of the rare cases where the decision changed after arguments. The original poll of the justices showed a 7–2 majority for affirmance, with only White and Stevens holding out. But White argued persuasively for reversal to his fellow Justices, and Blackmun and Clarence Thomas, who had replaced Marshall, changed their minds. It has been suggested that Thomas, who later established a reputation for allowing wide latitude to law enforcement similar to other contemporary Republican appointees, was especially sensitive at that time to Jacobson's situation due to the sexual harassment allegations raised by Anita Hill during his own recent confirmation hearings.

Justice David Souter later provided the swing vote, and opinions that White and Sandra Day O'Connor had already begun drafting had to be rewritten to represent the changed outcome of the case.

==== Majority ====
White, reiterating what he had written in Ferber, acknowledged that CSAM was a social evil and that the government could use undercover investigations to enforce laws against it. After reviewing the previous cases on entrapment, he said that the more than two years in which investigators had tried to get Jacobson to buy various child-porn offerings had suggested he did not have a predisposition to do so: "... (I)t is our view that the Government did not prove that this predisposition was independent, and not the product of the attention that the Government had directed at petitioner since January, 1985".

Since the Bare Boys purchases were legal at the time, they did not prove that he was willing to violate the law to acquire such materials. "... (E)vidence that merely indicates a generic inclination to act within a broad range, not all of which is criminal, is of little probative value in establishing predisposition", he wrote. "Evidence of predisposition to do what once was lawful is not, by itself, sufficient to show predisposition to do what is now illegal, for there is a common understanding that most people obey the law even when they disapprove of it". He also noted that, at trial, the prosecution had not challenged Jacobson's assertion that he did not know the magazines would contain pictures of minors until he received it.

Furthermore, he suggested, the appeals to political action he received may have given him reasons other than prurient interest to order the material, indeed even suggested he had a duty to order them as a way of taking a stand:

... (T)he strong arguable inference is that, by waving the banner of individual rights and disparaging the legitimacy and constitutionality of efforts to restrict the availability of sexually explicit materials, the Government not only excited petitioner's interest in sexually explicit materials banned by law, but also exerted substantial pressure on petitioner to obtain and read such material as part of a fight against censorship and the infringement of individual rights ... The evidence that petitioner was ready and willing to commit the offense came only after the Government had devoted 2 1/2 years to convincing him that he had or should have the right to engage in the very behavior proscribed by law.

White also dismissed the notion that his responses to the surveys he was sent proved he was willing to order child porn illegally, saying they only indicated "a predisposition to view photographs of preteen sex and a willingness to promote a given agenda by supporting lobbying organizations ... petitioner's responses hardly support an inference that he would commit the crime of receiving child pornography through the mails". He noted that twice before the Court had suggested that an individual's private fantasies are not the government's business, even if it has a strong interest in proscribing the enactment of those fantasies.

"When the Government's quest for convictions", he concluded, "leads to the apprehension of an otherwise law-abiding citizen who, if left to his own devices, likely would have never run afoul of the law, the courts should intervene."

==== Dissent ====
O'Connor made two arguments for the dissenting justices: that predisposition was proven by the fact that Jacobson had ordered materials both times he was actually solicited, and that the Court had usurped the jury's rightful role in deciding whether he was entrapped. She also expressed fears that the court had so broadened the definition of predisposition as to make it a viable defense in almost any case.

She began by stating what was, to the minority, the most relevant aspect of the case.

Keith Jacobson was offered only two opportunities to buy child pornography through the mail. Both times, he ordered. Both times, he asked for opportunities to buy more. He needed no Government agent to coax, threaten, or persuade him; no one played on his sympathies, friendship, or suggested that his committing the crime would further a greater good. In fact, no Government agent even contacted him face to face.

She noted also that Jacobson had written, in a note included with his order, that he would be doing more business with the company later and that he wanted to "(b)e discreet in order to protect you and me".

The majority, she said, had so greatly expanded the government's burden of proof in undercover sting operations as to make future such investigations untenable:

... (A)fter this case, every defendant will claim that something the Government agent did before soliciting the crime "created" a predisposition that was not there before. For example, a bribetaker will claim that the description of the amount of money available was so enticing that it implanted a disposition to accept the bribe later offered. A drug buyer will claim that the description of the drug's purity and effects was so tempting that it created the urge to try it for the first time. In short, the Court's opinion could be read to prohibit the Government from advertising the seductions of criminal activity as part of its sting operation, for fear of creating a predisposition in its suspects.

She scoffed at White's claim that the calls to activism were possibly instrumental in creating a predisposition to offend: "The most one finds is letters advocating legislative action to liberalize obscenity laws, letters which could easily be ignored or thrown away ... Nor did the Government claim to be organizing a civil disobedience movement, which would protest the pornography laws by breaking them." It was up to the jury, she said, to decide what Jacobson meant when he said on the stand that he wanted to see "what all the trouble and hysteria was about", and they had done so.

In Part II, she accused her colleagues of redefining predisposition so that it had to include an awareness that the action to be undertaken was illegal, despite the fact that the CPA did not include specific intent to receive child pornography as an element of the crime. "The elements of predisposition," she said, "should track the elements of the crime". The Bare Boys purchases were not, she argued, as dispositive of that as the majority claimed. Her last sentences responded to White's, saying that there was no question that the jury had been properly instructed on entrapment law and thus, their decision that Jacobson could not claim entrapment should be allowed to stand.

== Aftermath ==
=== Reaction ===
New York Times' reporter Linda Greenhouse described the initial verdict as "an anomaly, an extreme misuse of Government power in which an innocent person was led to commit a manufactured crime" and thus not likely to signal a shift back in favor of defendants after a period that had seen a move away from the liberalism of the Warren and Burger Courts towards a more law-and-order–oriented Court. Editorialists at newspapers around the country – the Times, the Chicago Tribune, and the Washington Post – praised the court's decision, as did Jacobson's hometown paper, the Omaha World-Herald. Columnists on both sides of the political spectrum, from Clarence Page to William Safire joined in celebrating his victory and criticizing the excessive zeal of the postal inspectors. Civil liberties advocates savored what they felt was an overdue triumph against the overreach of law enforcement during the preceding decade. "... (W)hen the State gets behind a moral panic, no one is safe," wrote Bob Chatelle of the political issues committee of the National Writers' Union, indicating other zealous prosecutions of people with no demonstrable interest in CSAM who had nevertheless fallen afoul of newer laws by taking or possessing pictures of naked children with no apparent sexual content.

Others objected to what they termed the horrific cost of Project Looking Glass. Among its other targets had been another middle-aged Nebraska farmer, Bob Brase, of Shelby. Like Jacobson, his name had been on the mailing list of a pornography distributor, and despite neither having a criminal record nor any interest in CSAM he was relentlessly solicited, including letters from the same "Carl Long". Finally he ordered a videotape and was arrested and indicted. No other prohibited material was found in his house, either.

Just before he was to be arraigned, he drove into a field and shot himself, leaving behind a wife and two children. His was one of four suicides by Looking Glass targets. Critics wondered if these suicides, which investigators had said they expected, were worth it. In 1999, Comfort also took his own life, citing despondency over the stresses of his job.

=== Legacy ===
Jacobson, opined Paul Marcus, a law professor at William & Mary three years later, "brought entrapment back from the (almost) dead". He noted that in its wake, courts were much more willing to allow, and sometimes agree with, entrapment defenses than they had been beforehand. Influential judge Richard Posner had used similar language a year before, writing in an opinion that it had "breathed new life" into the defense. Most significantly, he said, appeals courts were now considering it in cases where the defendant had seemed willing to commit the crime, examining predisposition closely in cases where they would have previously rejected it out of hand.

Despite vows by prosecutors and chiefs of federal law enforcement agencies that the decision would not change the way they did undercover operations, there were some noticeable changes, at least at the federal level. Later versions of the Attorney General's Guidelines on FBI Undercover Operations, much emulated by other federal agencies, show some changes in language from those published before Jacobson. "Entrapment should be avoided", became "entrapment must be avoided", and investigators were told it must be apparent to them that the activity they were investigating was illegal, rather than just corrupt. A definition of entrapment was included that used the same language as the decision.

Authors Joyce Murdoch and Deb Pryce say another effect of the case was a softening of the Court's attitude towards the gay community. Jacobson was the first such person to come before the Court to receive even the slightest empathy from it, and even a few years earlier his case might have been doomed from the start on that basis alone.

=== Subsequent lower-court jurisprudence ===
Jacobson remains the Court's current standard on the issue as it has not considered an entrapment case since. Similar sting operations continue to be widely used against all types of targets and in new ways. Most significantly, the rise of the Internet has resulted in operations where investigators pose as minors of either sex in chat rooms, trying to entice online predators to come meet them in person and have sex. When they do, they are arrested. These operations have become popular viewing on Dateline NBC's "To Catch A Predator" segments and other television shows.

Most such operations are over very quickly and result in guilty pleas, but entrapment is sometimes alleged, and a protracted investigation of a Florida man resulted in the first Internet entrapment case to be considered at the appellate level. Writing for a Ninth Circuit majority (the arrest occurred in California) in United States v Poehlman, 217 F3d 692 (9th Cir 2000), Judge Alex Kozinski reversed the conviction, saying the defendant had met the Jacobson standard and shown that the idea of crossing state lines to have sex with a minor had been implanted only after extensive email correspondence with an undercover FBI agent. In 2014 a case resulting from a sting operation was ruled by a Federal court to have been "cut from whole cloth" by ATF operatives and to have constituted as entrapment by the ATF; the case was dismissed.

=== Other analysis and commentary ===
Kenneth Lord notes that the decision did not address the subjective vs. objective test question at all. He observes that the decision adds two new strictures as part of its general rule that prosecutors must prove beyond a reasonable doubt that the defendant was predisposed to commit the crime prior to any contact by government agents:

- Behavior by the defendant which was legal at the time but later made illegal does not suffice to prove predisposition, and
- the defendant's predisposition must be evaluated based on his or her behavior prior to the commencement of any investigation.

But beyond that, it makes no effort to address the subjective vs. objective question, nor does its discussion of intent delve into the matter of specific vs. general intent. Some appeals courts, however, have developed more specific entrapment tests on their own.

University of Arizona law professor Gabriel J. Chin points out that the entire federal entrapment defense rests on statutory construction, which allows for the possibility that Congress could simply repeal or modify it so that operations implanting suggestion of criminal activity such as the one that ensnared Jacobson were authorized specifically by law. Since the majority had shown such distaste for it, how, he wondered, would it rule on the constitutionality of such a law if it were to be challenged?

== See also ==
- List of United States Supreme Court cases, volume 503
- List of United States Supreme Court cases
- Lists of United States Supreme Court cases by volume
- List of United States Supreme Court cases by the Rehnquist Court
