= Sorrells v. United States =

- Supreme Court of the United States

Argued November 8, 1932 Decided December 19, 1932
- Full case name: Sorrells v. United States
- Citations: 287 U.S. 435 (more) 53 S. Ct. 210, 77 L. Ed. 413, 1932 U.S. LEXIS 30

Case history
- Prior: Defendant convicted; conviction affirmed, 57 F.2d 973; certiorari granted, 287 U.S. 584 (1932).
- Subsequent: Conviction reversed

Holding
- Entrapment is a valid defense; the prosecution must show the defendant had a predisposition to commit the crime if it is raised.

Court membership
- Chief Justice Charles E. Hughes Associate Justices Willis Van Devanter · James C. McReynolds; Louis Brandeis · George Sutherland; Pierce Butler · Harlan F. Stone; Owen Roberts · Benjamin N. Cardozo

Case opinions
- Majority: Hughes, joined by Van Devanter, Sutherland, Butler, Cardozo
- Concurrence: Roberts, joined by Brandeis, Stone
- Dissent: McReynolds (no opinion)

Laws applied
- statutory construction

Sorrells v. United States, 287 U.S. 435 (1932), is a Supreme Court case in which the justices unanimously recognized the entrapment defense. However, while the majority opinion by Chief Justice Charles Evans Hughes located the key to entrapment in the defendant's predisposition or lack thereof to commit the crime, Owen Roberts' concurring opinion proposed instead that it be rooted in an analysis of the conduct of the law enforcement agents making the arrest. Although the Court has stuck with predisposition, the dispute has hung over entrapment jurisprudence ever since.

== Background of the case ==
In 1930, Martin, a Prohibition agent in Haywood County, North Carolina, heard from informers that Vaughno Crawford Sorrells, a factory worker at Champion Fiber Company in Canton, had a reputation as a rumrunner. He arranged to visit Sorrells at his home in Sorrells Cove in Canton, on July 13, accompanied by three acquaintances of Sorrells.

He had them introduce him to Sorrells as a fellow veteran of the U.S. Army 30th Infantry Division who had served in World War I and was passing through the area. At several times during an hour and a half of conversation and reminiscing the agent asked Sorrells if he would be so kind as to get a fellow soldier some liquor. Sorrells initially refused, but later wore down and procured him a half-gallon bottle of whiskey for $5. Martin then arrested him for violating the National Prohibition Act.

== Lower courts ==
Sorrells was convicted in federal court largely on the strength of Martin's testimony that he was the only one who had asked about acquiring liquor. Three other witnesses testified on rebuttal as to his general reputation as a rumrunner.

In his defense, Sorrells said that he had told Martin that he "did not fool with whiskey" several times before yielding. One of the acquaintances present also testified that he had no idea either that Martin was a government agent or that Sorrells dealt in liquor. His neighbors testified to his character, and the timekeeper at the factory where he worked also testified to his punctuality and good conduct during six years of employment there. In the lower courts, Sorrells's name was entered as CV Sorrells and was never corrected throughout the case.

The court did not allow entrapment to be raised, ruling it had not occurred as a matter of law.

The appeals court affirmed the conviction, whereupon Sorrells' attorney petitioned for certiorari. The court granted it on the condition it was limited to arguing entrapment as a defense.

== Decision ==
=== Majority ===
Calling the investigation a "gross abuse of authority", Hughes wrote:

It is clear that the evidence was sufficient to warrant a finding that the act for which defendant was prosecuted was instigated by the prohibition agent, that it was the creature of his purpose, that defendant had no previous disposition to commit it but was an industrious, law-abiding citizen, and that the agent lured defendant, otherwise innocent, to its commission by repeated and persistent solicitation in which he succeeded by taking advantage of the sentiment aroused by reminiscences of their experiences as companions in arms in the World War.

He reached his conclusion by construing statutes to mean that Congress wanted to prevent crime, not punish it, therefore entrapment had to be available as a defense.

=== Concurrence ===
Roberts' concurrence, joined by Harlan Fiske Stone and Louis Brandeis, took strong issue with this finding:

This seems a strained and unwarranted construction of the statute; and amounts, in fact, to judicial amendment. It is not merely broad construction, but addition of an element not contained in the legislation ... no guide or rule is announced as to when a statute shall be read as excluding a case of entrapment; and no principle of statutory construction is suggested which would enable us to say that it is excluded by some statutes and not by others.

Courts should instead, he said, focus on the conduct of the investigating officers instead of the defendants' predisposition. "Entrapment," he wrote, "is the conception and planning of an offense by an officer, and his procurement of its commission by one who would not have perpetrated it except for the trickery, persuasion, or fraud of the officer."

=== Dissent ===
Justice McReynolds was the only Justice to dissent from the Court's decision. However, he published no opinion in the case. His only comment was an inserted notation at the bottom of the majority opinion that he "would vote to affirm." This practice, sometimes called a "graveyard dissent," was once common on the Supreme Court, but has fallen out of favor and is very rarely practiced today.

== Subsequent jurisprudence ==
- Sherman v. United States, (356 U.S. 369 (1958)). Defendant's prior criminal history is not by itself sufficient to establish predisposition.
- Jacobson v. United States (503 U.S. 540 (1992)). Previous conduct by defendant does not show predisposition if it were legal at the time; state must prove beyond reasonable doubt that predisposition existed before investigation.

== See also ==
- List of United States Supreme Court cases, volume 287
