= Fisher v. United States (1976) =

- Supreme Court of the United States

Argued November 3, 1975 Decided April 21, 1976
- Full case name: Fisher et al. v. United States et al.
- Docket no.: 74-18
- Citations: 425 U.S. 391 (more)

Case history
- Prior: Certiorari to the United States Court of Appeals for the Third Circuit

Court membership
- Chief Justice Warren E. Burger Associate Justices William J. Brennan Jr. · Potter Stewart; Byron White · Thurgood Marshall; Harry Blackmun · Lewis F. Powell Jr. William Rehnquist · John P. Stevens

Case opinions
- Majority: White, joined by Burger, Stewart, Blackmun, Powell, and Rehnquist
- Concurrence: Brennan (in judgment only)
- Concurrence: Marshall (in judgment only)
- Stevens took no part in the consideration or decision of the case.

Fisher v. United States, 425 U.S. 391 (1976), is a decision of the U.S. Supreme Court which held that the Fifth Amendment's self-incrimination clause does not protect a taxpayer or their attorney from being required to turn over workpapers prepared by the taxpayer's accountant. The case was decided together with the companion case United States v. Kasmir, because the Fifth Circuit Court of Appeals considered similar issues but reached the opposite of the Third Circuit's conclusion in Fisher.
