= List of United States Supreme Court cases, volume 425 =

This is a list of all the United States Supreme Court cases from volume 425 of the United States Reports:

Case name	Citation	Date decided
Abbott Laboratories v. Portland Retail Druggists Ass'n, Inc.	425 U.S. 1	1976
Middendorf v. Henry	425 U.S. 25	1976
Carey v. Sugar	425 U.S. 73	1976
Geders v. United States	425 U.S. 80	1976
Goldberg v. United States	425 U.S. 94	1976
Beer v. United States	425 U.S. 130	1976
United States v. United Cont'l Tuna Corp.	425 U.S. 164	1976
Ernst & Ernst v. Hochfelder	425 U.S. 185	1976
Dann v. Johnston	425 U.S. 219	1976
Youakim v. Miller	425 U.S. 231	1976
Kelley v. Johnson	425 U.S. 238	1976
Ohio v. Gallagher	425 U.S. 257	1976
Butler v. Dexter	425 U.S. 262	1976
Diamond Nat'l Corp. v. State Bd. of Equalization	425 U.S. 268	1976
Sakraida v. AG Pro, Inc.	425 U.S. 273	1976
Hills v. Gautreaux	425 U.S. 284	1976
Baxter v. Palmigiano	425 U.S. 308	1976
Beckwith v. United States	425 U.S. 341	1976
Dept. of Air Force v. Rose	425 U.S. 352	1976
Fisher v. United States	425 U.S. 391	1976
United States v. Miller (1976)	425 U.S. 435	1976
N.Y. Civil Serv. Comm'n v. Snead	425 U.S. 457	1976
Nat'l Bank v. Associates of Obstetrics & Female Surgery, Inc.	425 U.S. 460	1976
Moe v. Confed. Salish & Kootenai Tribes	425 U.S. 463	1976
Hampton v. United States	425 U.S. 484	1976
Estelle v. Williams	425 U.S. 501	1976
Francis v. Henderson	425 U.S. 536	1976
Drew Municipal Separate Sch. Dist. v. Andrews	425 U.S. 559	1976
Quinn v. Muscare	425 U.S. 560	1976
United States v. Mandujano	425 U.S. 564	1976
Hynes v. City of Oradell	425 U.S. 610	1976
Am. Motorists Ins. Co. v. Starnes	425 U.S. 637	1976
N. Cheyenne Tribe v. Hollowbreast	425 U.S. 649	1976
NAACP v. FPC	425 U.S. 662	1976
Connor v. Coleman	425 U.S. 675	1976
Alfred Dunhill of London, Inc. v. Republic of Cuba	425 U.S. 682	1976
Hosp. Building Co. v. Rex Hosp.	425 U.S. 738	1976
Virginia State Pharmacy Board v. Virginia Citizens Consumer Council	425 U.S. 748	1976
United States v. Florida	425 U.S. 791	1976
Arizona v. New Mexico	425 U.S. 794	1976
S. Prairie Constr. Co. v. Operating Engineers	425 U.S. 800	1976
United States v. Orleans	425 U.S. 807	1976
Brown v. GSA	425 U.S. 820	1976
Chandler v. Roudebush	425 U.S. 840	1976
