= Entrapment =

Legal doctrine

Entrapment is a practice in which a law enforcement agent or an agent of the state induces a person to commit a crime that the person would have otherwise been unlikely or unwilling to commit. In US law, it is defined as "the conception and planning of an offense by an officer or agent, and the procurement of its commission by one who would not have perpetrated it except for the trickery, persuasion or fraud of the officer or state agent".

Police conduct rising to the level of entrapment is broadly discouraged and thus, in many jurisdictions, is available as a defense against criminal liability. Sting operations, through which police officers or agents engage in deception to try to catch persons who are committing crimes, raise concerns about possible entrapment.

Depending on the law in the jurisdiction, the prosecution may be required to prove beyond a reasonable doubt that the defendant was not entrapped or the defendant may be required to prove that they were entrapped as an affirmative defense.

In the practice of journalism and whistle-blowing, entrapment means "deceptive and trust-breaking techniques ... applied to trick someone to commit a legal or moral transgression".

== Etymology and usage ==
The word "entrapment", from the verb "to entrap," meaning to catch in a trap, was first used publicly in this sense in 1899 in the United States Court of Appeals for the Tenth Circuit case of People v. Braisted.

The 1828 edition of Noah Webster's American Dictionary of the English Language defines entrap as:

To catch as in a trap; to insnare [sic]; used chiefly or wholly in a figurative sense. To catch by artifices; to involve in difficulties or distresses; to entangle; to catch or involve in contraindications; in short, to involve in any difficulties from which an escape is not easy or possible. We are entrapped by the devices of evil men. We are sometimes entrapped in our own words.

== Canada ==
The Supreme Court of Canada developed the doctrine of entrapment in three major decisions: R. v. Amato, [1982] 2 S.C.R. 418, R. v. Mack, [1988] 2 S.C.R. 903, and R. v. Barnes, [1991] 1 S.C.R. 449.

There are two different forms of entrapment in Canadian law.

1. Random virtue testing: This form of entrapment occurs when the police offer an individual the opportunity to commit a crime without reasonable suspicion that either that individual or where that individual is located is associated with the criminal activity under investigation. If police have such a reasonable suspicion, they are still limited to providing only an opportunity to commit the offence.
2. Inducement of an offence: This form of entrapment occurs when the police go beyond merely providing an opportunity to commit an offence but actually induce the commission of the offense. Some factors a court may consider when deciding whether police have induced the offence include the type of crime being investigated, whether an average person would have been induced, the persistence and number of attempts made by the police, the type of inducement used (fraud, deceit, reward, etc.), and the existence of express or implied threats.

The question of entrapment is considered only after there has been a finding of guilt. If, after finding the accused guilty, the court determines that the accused was entrapped, the court enters a judicial stay of proceedings. That is similar to an acquittal.

=== History ===
In 2013, a British Columbia couple was found guilty of attempting to blow up the British Columbia Parliament Buildings. In 2016, the verdict was overturned because the couple were found to have been entrapped into the plot by the Royal Canadian Mounted Police.

It was the first time entrapment had been successfully argued in a terrorism case. Three previous attempts failed.

== Germany ==
In German law, it is normally forbidden to induce or persuade someone to commit a crime or to attempt to do so. However, the German Federal Court of Justice has held that entrapment by undercover police agents is not a reason to stay the case per se. If undercover agents have been used without proper justification, punishment for the committed offense may be reduced.

In the case of persons who are not initially under suspicion and unlikely to commit a certain crime, a decision from 1999 stated that entrapment of such persons violates the right to a fair trial, and the punishment for the committed offense may thus be reduced.

== United Kingdom ==
=== England and Wales ===
The main authority on entrapment in England and Wales, held to be equally applicable in Scotland, is the decision of the House of Lords in R v Loosely (2001). A stay is granted if the conduct of the state was so seriously improper that the administration of justice was brought into disrepute. In deciding whether to grant a stay, the Court will consider, as a useful guide, whether the police did more than present the defendant with an unexceptional opportunity to commit a crime.

In Loosely, Lords Hoffman and Hutton indicated certain factors that should be considered in deciding whether proceedings against a defendant should be stayed:

- Whether the police acted in good faith;
- Whether the police had good reason to suspect the accused of criminal activities;
- Whether the police suspected that crime was particularly prevalent in the area in which the investigation took place (Williams v DPP);
- Whether pro-active investigatory techniques were necessary because of the secrecy and difficulty of detection of the criminal activity in question;
- The defendant's circumstances and vulnerability; and
- The nature of the offence.

It has been held that it is generally acceptable for the police to conduct test purchases (DPP v Marshall) or pose as passengers to catch unlicensed taxi drivers (Nottingham City Council v Amin).

Historically, entrapment was common in the eighteenth and nineteenth century, and was used frequently by the Bank of England and Royal Mint to catch people involved in currency crime during the Restriction Period of 1797–1820.

Entrapment by plainclothes policemen was often used to prosecute gay men, even after the Sexual Offences Act 1967 exempted consensual gay sex in private from prosecution.

=== Scotland ===
In Scotland the main authority is the case of Brown v HMA (2002) which stated that entrapment will occur when law enforcement officials cause an offense to be committed which would not have occurred had it not been for their involvement. The remedies available correspond with those in England and are considered to be either a plea in bar of trial or a challenge to the admissibility of evidence obtained through entrapment.

== United States ==
In the United States, two competing tests exist for determining whether entrapment has taken place, known as the "subjective" and "objective" tests.

- The "subjective" test looks at the defendant's state of mind; entrapment can be claimed if the defendant had no "predisposition" to commit the crime.
- The "objective" test looks instead at the government's conduct; entrapment occurs when the actions of government officers would usually have caused a normally law-abiding person to commit a crime.

Contrary to popular belief, the United States does not require police officers to identify themselves as police in the case of a sting or other undercover work, and police officers may lie when engaged in such work. The law of entrapment instead focuses on whether people were enticed to commit crimes they would not have otherwise considered in the normal course of events.

=== History ===
Entrapment defenses in the United States have evolved mainly through case law.

Courts took a dim view of the defense at first. The New York Supreme Court said in 1864 that "[It] has never availed to shield crime or give indemnity to the culprit, and it is safe to say that under any code of civilized, not to say Christian, ethics, it never will". (Note: A fuller quote includes a reference to original sin. Even if inducements to commit crime could be assumed to exist in this case, the allegation of the defendant would be but the repetition of the plea as ancient as the world, and first interposed in Paradise: "The serpent beguiled me and I did eat." That defense was overruled by the great Lawgiver, and whatever estimate we may form, or whatever judgment pass upon the character or conduct of the tempter, this plea has never since availed to shield crime or give indemnity to the culprit, and it is safe to say that under any code of civilized, not to say Christian ethics, it never will.) Forty years later, another judge in that state affirmed that rejection, arguing "[courts] should not hesitate to punish the crime actually committed by the defendant" when rejecting entrapment claimed in a grand larceny case.

Other states, however, had already begun reversing convictions on entrapment grounds. Federal courts recognized entrapment as a defense starting with Woo Wai v. United States. The U.S. Supreme Court declined to consider the question of entrapment in Casey v. United States, since the facts in the case were too vague to definitively rule on the question; but, four years later, it did. In Sorrells v. United States, the Supreme Court unanimously reversed the conviction of a North Carolina factory worker who gave in to an undercover Prohibition officer's repeated entreaties to get him some liquor. It identified the controlling question as "whether the defendant is a person otherwise innocent whom the government is seeking to punish for an alleged offense which is the product of the creative activity of its own officials".

In Sherman v. United States, the Court considered a similar case in which one recovering drug addict working with agents of the Federal Bureau of Narcotics (a predecessor agency to today's Drug Enforcement Administration (DEA)) solicited another to sell him drugs on the premise that his own efforts were failing. Again unanimous, its opinion focused more clearly on the defendant's predisposition to commit the offense and, on that basis, overturned Sherman's conviction as well since, although he had two prior drug convictions, the most recent dated back five years. Furthermore, he was attempting to rehabilitate himself, he had made no profit on the sales, and no drugs were found in his apartment when it was searched, suggesting the absence of a predisposition to break drug laws. "To determine whether entrapment has been established", it said, "a line must be drawn between the trap for the unwary innocent and the trap for the unwary criminal".

Prosecutors won the next two times entrapment came before the Court, in United States v. Russell and Hampton v. United States, albeit by narrow margins. In the former, the Court upheld the conviction of a Washington man for manufacturing methamphetamine even though an undercover agent had supplied some of the ingredients, and also pondered an outrageous government conduct defense, though it did not enable it. Hampton let stand, by a similar margin, the conviction of a Missouri man who had, upon seeing track marks on the arms of a DEA informant, expressed interest in obtaining heroin to sell. The DEA informant arranged a meeting between the Missouri man and undercover DEA agents in which the Missouri man sold a small quantity of heroin to agents and indicated that he could obtain larger quantities. After a second sale to the undercover agents, he was arrested. The defendant alleged that the informant supplied the drugs and that he had been led to believe, by the informant, that he was not selling heroin but a counterfeit with which he intended to defraud the buyers. Regardless, the Court found he was sufficiently predisposed to sell heroin so as to be criminally liable.

The argument employed in the majority opinion on Hampton became known as the "subjective" test of entrapment, since it focused on the defendant's state of mind. However, in all cases, concurring opinions had advocated an "objective" test, focusing instead on whether the conduct of the police or other investigators would catch only those "ready and willing to commit crime". Under the objective approach the defendant's personality (i.e., his predisposition to commit the crime) would be immaterial, and the potential for the police conduct to induce a law-abiding person considered in the abstract would be the test. This, supporters argued, avoided the dubious issue of an unexpressed legislative intent on which the Sorrells court had relied and instead grounded the entrapment defence, like the exclusionary rule, in the court's supervisory role over law enforcement. And like the exclusionary rule, they would have had judges, not juries, decide whether a defendant had been entrapped as a matter of law.

Since the subjective test focusing on predisposition had, unlike the exclusionary rule, not been applied to the states, they were free to follow it as they saw fit. The state courts or legislatures of 37 states have chosen the subjective test, while the others use the objective test. Some have allowed both the judge and the jury to rule on whether the defendant was entrapped.

In the Supreme Court's last major ruling on entrapment, Jacobson v. United States, which overturned the conviction of a Nebraska man for receiving child pornography via the mail, the subjective vs. objective debate was completely absent. Both the majority and dissenting opinions focused solely on whether the prosecution had established that the defendant had a predisposition for purchasing such material (which had only recently been outlawed at the time of his arrest). Since no other material was found in his home save what he had purchased from the undercover postal inspectors, Justice Byron White believed the operation had implanted the idea in his mind through mailings decrying politicians for assaulting civil liberties by passing laws such as the one the inspectors hoped he would break. Justice Sandra Day O'Connor disagreed in her dissent, arguing that the record did indeed establish that Jacobson was interested in continuing the purchases.

=== Entrapment by estoppel ===
A subset of the entrapment defense was first recognized by the Supreme Court in Raley v. Ohio. There, four defendants were testifying before a committee of the Ohio State Legislature. The chairman of the committee told them that they could assert their right against self-incrimination. They asserted this right, and refused to answer questions. However, Ohio law provided them immunity from prosecution, so the right against self-incrimination was inapplicable, and they were subsequently prosecuted for their failure to answer questions. The Supreme Court overturned three of the four convictions based on the doctrine of entrapment by estoppel. (The fourth refused to state his address, at which point the committee expressed the view that the right against self-incrimination did not apply to that question.)

As described in United States v. Howell, the defense "applies when, acting with actual or apparent authority, a government official affirmatively assures the defendant that certain conduct is legal and the defendant reasonably believes that official".

The entrapment by estoppel defense exists in both federal and city jurisdictions; however, case law remains inconsistent as to whether the misleading advice of e.g. a state official provides protection against federal criminal charges. Examples exist of an appellate court failing to allow an entrapment by estoppel defense where a municipal official provided misleading instructions regarding a state law.

=== Federal court ===
Federal courts apply a subjective test for claims of entrapment. In federal criminal prosecutions, if a defendant proves entrapment the defendant may not be convicted of the underlying crime. A valid entrapment defense has two related elements:

1. government inducement of the crime, and
2. the defendant's lack of predisposition to engage in the criminal conduct.

The federal entrapment defense is based upon statutory construction, the federal courts' interpretation of the will of Congress in passing the criminal statutes. As this is not a constitutional prohibition, Congress may change or override this interpretation by passing a law.

=== State court ===
Each state has its own case law and statutory law that defines when and how the entrapment defense is available, and states may choose to adopt either the subjective or objective test for what government action constitutes entrapment. The essential elements of an entrapment defense are:

1. Improper inducement: the government induced the defendant to commit the crime; and
2. Lack of predisposition: the defendant (or, under the objective test, an ordinary person in the position of the defendant) would not have committed the crime but for the government's inducement.

== European Convention of Human Rights ==
Article 6 of the European Convention on Human Rights has been interpreted as forbidding prosecution of acts induced by undercover officers. In the case of Teixeira de Castro v Portugal, the European Court of Human Rights found that the prosecution of a man for drugs offences after being asked by undercover police to procure heroin was a breach of the defendant's rights under Article 6 as the investigating officers's actions "went beyond those of undercover agents because they instigated the offence and there is nothing to suggest that without their intervention it would have been committed". The decision in Teixeira de Castro has been used by signatory countries in interpreting domestic law (e.g. in the United Kingdom in the Looseley case described above).

== See also ==
- Mr. Big (police procedure), a legal technique used in Canada, Australia and New Zealand, similar to entrapment
- Sting operation – Deceptive way to catch a person committing a crime
- Agent provocateur – Person who incites others to commit incriminating acts
- DPP v Armstrong
- Outrageous government conduct
- Frameup – Falsely prove someone guilty of a crime
- Abscam
- Provocatie (België)
