= List of United States Supreme Court cases, volume 503 =

This is a list of all the United States Supreme Court cases from volume 503 of the United States Reports:

| Case name | Citation | Date decided |
|---|---|---|
| Hudson v. McMillian | 503 U.S. 1 | 1992 |
| United States v. Nordic Village, Inc. | 503 U.S. 30 | 1992 |
| Holywell Corp. v. Smith | 503 U.S. 47 | 1992 |
| Franklin v. Gwinnett Cnty. Pub. Schools | 503 U.S. 60 | 1992 |
| INDOPCO, Inc. v. Commissioner | 503 U.S. 79 | 1992 |
| Arkansas v. Oklahoma | 503 U.S. 91 | 1992 |
| Collins v. Harker Heights | 503 U.S. 115 | 1992 |
| Willy v. Coastal Corp. | 503 U.S. 131 | 1992 |
| McCarthy v. Madigan | 503 U.S. 140 | 1992 |
| Dawson v. Delaware | 503 U.S. 159 | 1992 |
| General Motors Corp. v. Romein | 503 U.S. 181 | 1992 |
| Williams v. United States | 503 U.S. 193 | 1992 |
| Stringer v. Black | 503 U.S. 222 | 1992 |
| Connecticut National Bank v. Germain | 503 U.S. 249 | 1992 |
| PFZ Properties, Inc. v. Rodriguez | 503 U.S. 257 | 1992 |
Dismissed as improvidently granted.
| Holmes v. Sec. Investor Protection Corp. | 503 U.S. 258 | 1992 |
| United States v. RLC | 503 U.S. 291 | 1992 |
| Nationwide Mut. Ins. Co. v. Darden | 503 U.S. 318 | 1992 |
| United States v. Wilson | 503 U.S. 329 | 1992 |
| Suter v. Artist M. | 503 U.S. 347 | 1992 |
| United States v. Felix | 503 U.S. 378 | 1992 |
| Barnhill v. Johnson | 503 U.S. 393 | 1992 |
| National R.R. Passenger Corp. v. Boston & Me. Corp. | 503 U.S. 407 | 1992 |
| Robertson v. Seattle Audubon Soc. | 503 U.S. 429 | 1992 |
| Department of Com. v. Montana | 503 U.S. 442 | 1992 |
| Freeman v. Pitts | 503 U.S. 467 | 1992 |
| Yee v. Escondido | 503 U.S. 519 | 1992 |
| Jacobson v. United States | 503 U.S. 540 | 1992 |
| Trevino v. Texas | 503 U.S. 562 | 1992 |
| United States v. Alaska | 503 U.S. 569 | 1992 |
| Barker v. Kansas | 503 U.S. 594 | 1992 |
| Department of Energy v. Ohio | 503 U.S. 607 | 1992 |
| Taylor v. Freeland & Kronz | 503 U.S. 638 | 1992 |
| Gomez v. N.D. Cal. | 503 U.S. 653 | 1992 |
