= Stochastic terrorism =

Probabilistic link between public rhetoric and ideologically motivated violence

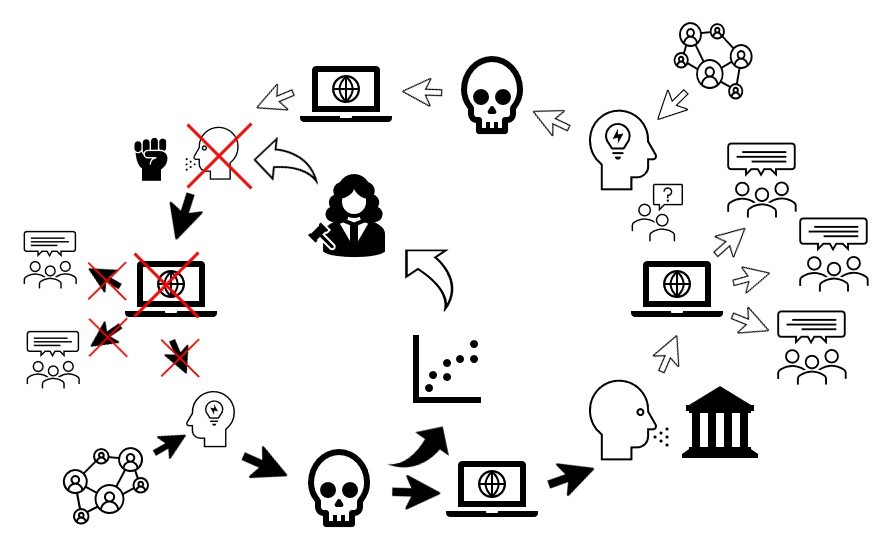
A conceptual schematic of stochastic terrorism, depicting hypothesized influence pathways of message transmission, media amplification, audience effects, other influences, and potential intervention points. The diagram indicates that "out-groups" may be more frequently targeted by the dominant social group, whereas comparable rhetoric supportive of established power draws correspondingly fewer police investigations. The model posits a self-reinforcing feedback loop in which different interpretations of what constitutes "threatening" speech can produce unequal enforcement outcomes.

Stochastic terrorism is an analytic description used in scholarship and counterterrorism to describe a mass-mediated process in which hostile public rhetoric, repeated and amplified across communication platforms, elevates the statistical risk of ideologically motivated violence by unknown individuals, even without direct coordination or explicit orders.

The phrase first appeared in the early-2000s as a probabilistic approach to quantifying the risk of a terrorist attack. In the 2010s, a second usage developed in public discourse as attention shifted toward mass communications, popularized by a 2011 blog definition that framed the "stochastic terrorist" as a speaker who leverages broad reach to provoke a unique type of lone-actor violence.

Contemporary treatments typically model a circuit of originator(s), amplifiers, and receivers who may act even in the absence of explicit directives. Stochastic terrorism is not explicitly defined in most legal systems. In the United States, related conduct is evaluated under existing doctrines such as Brandenburg v. Ohio and the true-threats doctrine.

Use of the term increased markedly after 2020 across criminology, security studies, media analysis, and popular media. Scholars continue to debate its scope, evidentiary thresholds, and best practices for applying the term without reducing its precise meaning.

== Origin and popularization of the term ==
"Stochastic terrorism is the use of mass communications to stir up random lone wolves to carry out violent or terrorist acts that are statistically predictable but individually unpredictable"

— G2geek, 2011

The term stochastic terrorism first appears in the risk-modeling literature of the early 2000s. In a 2002 article in The Journal of Risk Finance, risk analyst Gordon Woo introduced "a stochastic terrorism model" as part of a probabilistic framework for quantifying terrorism risk, by analogy to catastrophe modeling. He elaborated this approach in a 2003 paper for the National Bureau of Economic Research, which examined publicity cycles, copycat effects, and the state of the system within a stochastic framework. Etymologically, "stochastic" derives from Greek stochastikós ("aiming/guessing"), contrasting probabilistic processes with determinism.

In the 2010s, a second, less technical usage regarding mass communication emerged—the usage that would go on to become mainstream. A 2011 blog post on the Daily Kos platform by the pseudonymous "G2geek" reframed the idea as speech → violence, centering the speaker, rather than the attacker, as the "stochastic terrorist" who uses mass media to generate lone-actor violence. Subsequent academic surveys recount this genealogy and trace how the term moved into scholarship and policy debates, while noting variation in definitions across fields. A frequently cited scholarly gloss defines it as "the use of mass media to provoke random acts of ideologically motivated violence that are statistically predictable but individually unpredictable."

By the early 2020s the term appears across criminology, anthropology, policy, and counterterrorism discussions, though usage and scope vary.

== Conceptual model ==
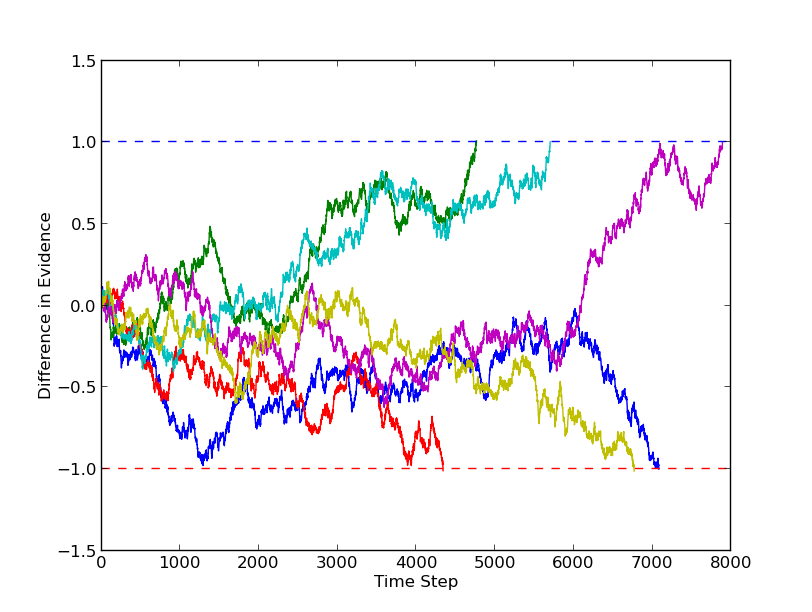
An example of a stochastic diffusion process. Such models illustrate how individually unpredictable outcomes can arise within statistically predictable patterns.

Retired FBI profiler Molly Amman and forensic psychologist J. Reid Meloy describe stochastic terrorism as an interactive process linking public rhetoric to acts of violence. Scholars typically employ a three-part structure: an originator (often a public figure or organization), amplifying forces (typically mass media platforms), and ultimate receivers—individuals who may act without direct coordination between speaker and attacker.

According to this framework, originators deploy hostile rhetoric toward identified out-groups while avoiding explicit calls for violence. Amplifiers repeat and spread the messages, causing some receivers to internalize the content and take action once a personal threshold is reached. The rhetoric frequently frames targets as existential threats and may use coded, joking, or ambiguous references to violence; particularly within echo chamber environments, this repetition can stoke anger, contempt, and fear.

Scholars describe the central dogma of stochastic terrorism as probabilistic: when hostile, dehumanizing, or threat-framed rhetoric is repeatedly amplified to mass audiences, it elevates the background risk of ideologically motivated violence by unknown individuals over time, even though who acts, when, and how remains indeterminate and uncoordinated. Continuing the Markovian modeling by Woo, Andrea Molle suggests that integrating computational modeling with policy-oriented interventions can potentially improve early-warning systems and provide a means to mitigating some types of political violence.

== Legal context and contrasts ==
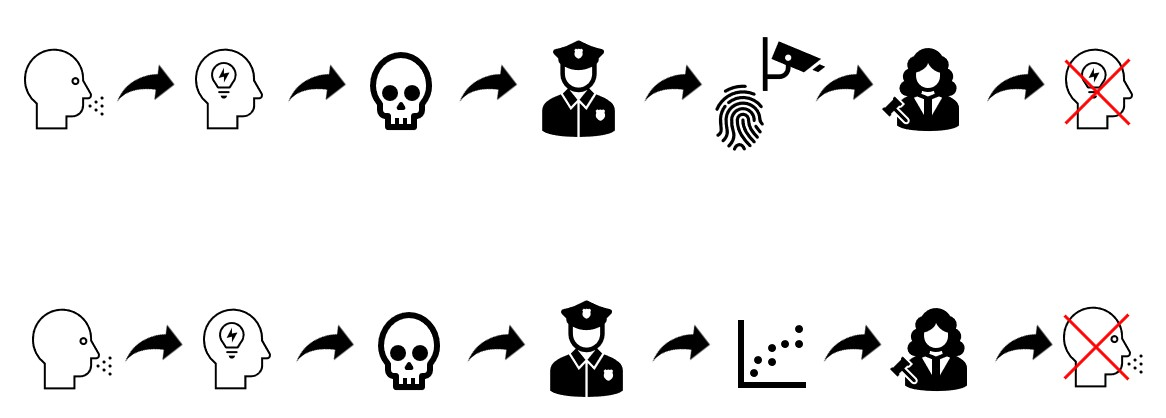
Top (traditional terrorism): authorities prosecute the lone actor and the speaker faces no direct legal consequence. Bottom (stochastic terrorism): authorities examine the speaker's indirect/statistical role while the actor is prosecuted separately.

In the United States, stochastic terrorism is neither a statutory offense nor a term of art in criminal codes; it is an analytic label used in scholarship and practitioner writing to describe probabilistic risks of violence linked to rhetoric. Recent legal and critical surveys stress that usage is heterogeneous and contested, and that the concept's value lies in describing a structure of communication and harm rather than in supplying a justiciable element test.

By contrast, U.S. incitement law is anchored in Brandenburg v. Ohio (1969), which protects advocacy short of speech that is intended to produce imminent lawless action and likely to do so. Stochastic accounts often concern non-directive, cumulative rhetoric whose effects materialize unpredictably, making the Brandenburg imminence and likelihood prongs difficult to satisfy absent clear exhortation.

Stochastic terror discussions also sit next to, rather than replace, the true threats doctrine. "True threats" are unprotected when the speaker purposefully communicates a serious expression of intent to commit unlawful violence, regardless of whether they plan to carry it out. This doctrine has been applied to online speech, where Elonis v. United States is often misread as a First Amendment shield when, in fact, the Court reversed on jury instruction mens rea grounds and the conviction was later reinstated.

Because "stochastic terrorism" names a risk mechanism rather than a codified offense, investigators and courts tend to translate it into familiar legal questions: Is there specific advocacy that meets Brandenburg? Is there a chargeable true threat? Is there conspiracy, solicitation, or material support? Where the answer is "no," the analytic label may still inform threat assessment (e.g., attention to "leakage," warning behaviors, and contextual build-up), but does not by itself establish criminal liability.

Scholars therefore distinguish between: (1) chargeable incitement/true-threats cases that meet existing elements and (2) stochastic-risk scenarios marked by demagogic, dehumanizing, and amplified rhetoric raising population-level risk. In the latter scenarios, the appropriate response is often preventative policy, platform governance, and threat-assessment rather than prosecution under a "stochastic terrorism" statute which does not exist.

== Rhetorical tactics, audience effects, and platform dynamics ==
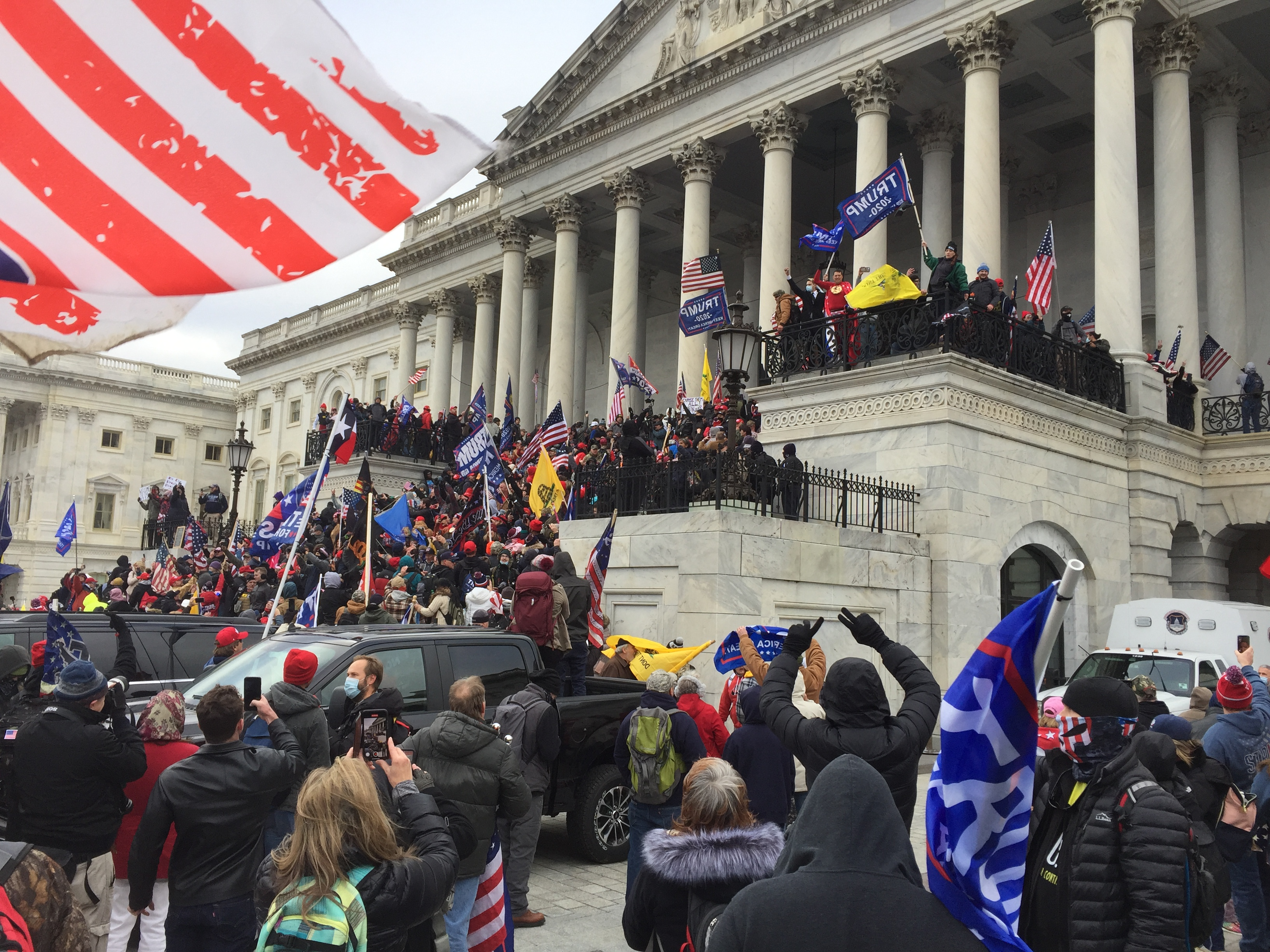
Scholarly literature on stochastic terrorism has used the 2021 attack on the U.S. Capitol as an illustrative example of the regression of large groups.

Scholarly analyses identify a cluster of persuasive devices used in terror campaigns associated with stochastic outcomes. These include coercive legitimization strategies that elevate the speaker's legitimacy or "right to be obeyed" and complementary delegitimization of opponents such as attacks on competence, sanity, or motives. Other common techniques include scapegoating, dehumanization, and the use of implicature or "joking" references to violent remedies to preserve plausible deniability.

Speakers often deploy a threat–fear–solution script akin to a fear appeal, presenting danger as existential, imminent, and/or personally consequential to pressure even disparate, heterogenous groups into action. Amman and Meloy have argued this particular tactic can contribute to erosion of democratic guardrails. Several authors highlight dehumanization as a particularly powerful form of demonization that helps unlock violence in receptive audiences.

In contrast with generic fighting words, analyses emphasize patterned false, negative characterizations of targets. For example, Dr. James Angove cited the labeling of COVID-19 as "the China virus" as a dehumanizing cue which essentialized a group as disease, linking such rhetoric to subsequent xenophobia and racism related to the COVID-19 pandemic. Related work argues that mainstreamed materials supply recognizable meanings that can normalize extreme outcomes; Angove situates such cues within broader authoritarian repertoires including conspiracy narratives and long-running moral panics that construct folk devils.

Large-group dynamics further shape audience reception. Drawing on the work of Cornell psychiatry professor Otto F. Kernberg, Amman and Meloy describe "poliregression," in which crowds can shift from narcissistic dependency on an admired leader to a paranoid posture that splits in- and out-groups, "closely mirroring the oftentimes primitive defenses of a severe personality disorder." As part of this "poliregression," targets discover an external otherized enemy, and rationalize "defensive" violence as imminently necessary. The overriding of democratic norms, entitlement, binary "extreme overvalued beliefs," and time compression can all contribute to a neurobiological tilt toward rapid action under perceived urgent threat.

Amman and Meloy treat the January 6 United States Capitol attack as a live example of poliregression: a crowd shifting from a benign, leader-focused rally into a paranoid, in-/out-group posture that cast an out-group as an imminent, existential threat and thereby rationalizing "defensive" violence. These scholars believe this phenomenon helps to explain the paradox of some law-enforcement participants assaulting police even as pre-planned actors operated alongside "regressed" followers.

Digital platforms and social media can accelerate and magnify these processes. Amman and Meloy describe "rhetorical accelerationism," whereby echo chambers amplify emotionally charged content. Empirical data indicate that lies travel farther, faster, and deeper than truths: falsehoods are about 70% more likely to be reshared online, with true stories taking around 6× longer to reach comparable audiences; furthermore, migration across platforms leads to a small minority of highly engaged clusters out-competing mainstream voices over time. They add that followers with authoritarian leanings may be especially susceptible to consensual validation in such environments.

On the receiver side, threat-assessment research offers practical indicators proximate to action. The Terrorist Radicalization Assessment Protocol-18 (TRAP-18) used on lone-actor terrorism cases emphasizes late-stage "pathway" behaviors such as research, preparation, adopting a warrior/pseudo-commando conception of self, affinity with prior attackers, and a "last-resort" time imperative as particularly discriminating warning behaviors in incitement contexts; by contrast, mere fixation is common and non-discriminating.

Media terrorism studies note that exploitation of publicity cycles and independent action long predates social media e.g., Al-Qaeda and the Islamic State using propaganda to inspire uncoordinated attackers.

== Countermeasures ==
Scholarly and practitioner work mostly emphasizes preventing stochastic terror rather than post hoc speech restrictions, with the aim of lowering the persuasive force of upstream cues before audiences encounter them at scale. Some approaches include attitudinal "pre-bunking"/inoculation, counterspeech that explains manipulative tactics, and nonviolent grievance channels. At the receiver level, threat-assessment experts primarily focus on late-stage, observable pathway behaviors rather than broad ideology. The TRAP-18 identifies extensive research, preparation, and "last-resort" time pressure as discriminating indicators that warrant intervention, whereas mere fixation does not.

Legal and ethical constraints differ by jurisdiction. In the United States, most stochastic terrorism discourse falls outside statutory categories and is treated through existing doctrines. By contrast, some European systems criminalize broader categories such as incitement to hatred (e.g., Germany's Volksverhetzung).

A 2021 report from the Arizona State University Threatcasting Lab noted that strategies for addressing stochastic terrorism resemble public health models more than conventional counterterrorism. The authors recommended approaches such as containment of harmful narratives, improved attribution of online amplification, and resilience programs to help communities resist randomized radicalization dynamics. A 2025 paper proposes a numerical modeling approach, coupled with policy-oriented interventions, to anticipate and mitigate some forms of potential political violence.

== Alleged incidents ==
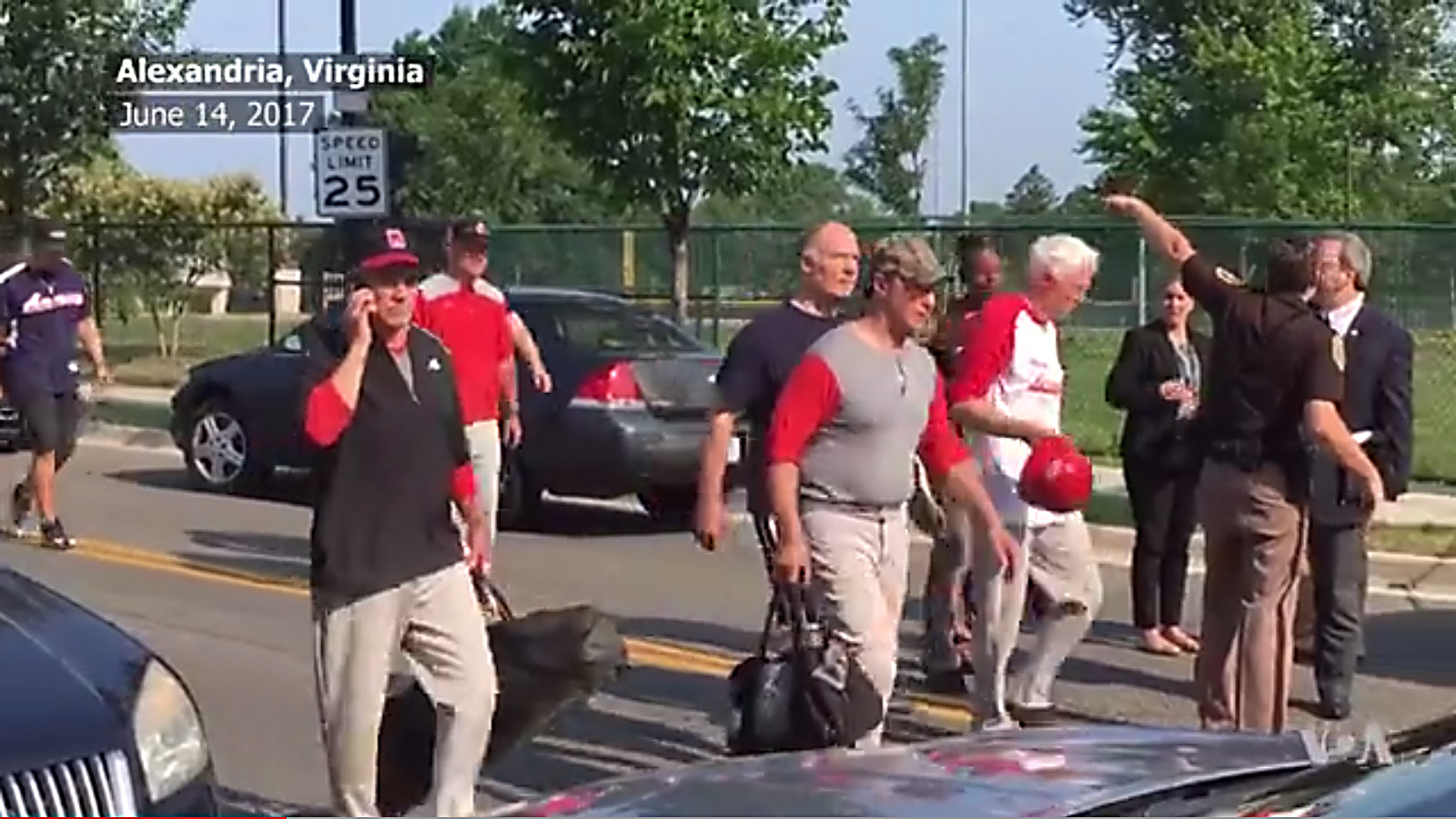
The aftermath of the 2017 Congressional Baseball shooting in Alexandria, Virginia, where a lone assailant shot six people in an act of domestic terror

Scholars have applied the concept of stochastic terrorism to a range of historical and contemporary cases.

- The murder of Thomas Becket in 1170 has been retroactively cited by FBI profiler Molly Amman and forensic psychologist J. Reid Meloy as an early illustration: King Henry II's ambiguous lament ("Will no one rid me of this turbulent priest?") was followed by four knights killing the Archbishop of Canterbury, despite no explicit order being given.
- Amman and Meloy further analyzed the assassination of Yitzhak Rabin in 1995 as an example of stochastic terrorism following months of vilification, mock funerals, and rabbinical rulings branding him a legitimate target.
- Criminologists Mark Hamm and Ramón Spaaij described the attempted attack in 2010 against the Tides Foundation and ACLU as stochastic terror, citing the influence of conservative media figures such as Glenn Beck on the would-be assassin, Byron Williams
- The 2011 Norway attacks by neo-Nazi Anders Breivik and the Christchurch mosque shootings in 2019 have been interpreted as outcomes of online radicalization pipelines where rhetorical and memetic culture fostered mass violence.
- Similarly, the Family Research Council shooting in 2012 by Floyd Corkins, who identified the organization via the Southern Poverty Law Center's "Hate Map," has been used in debates about whether public labeling can have stochastic effects.
- The Congressional baseball shooting in 2017, when a left-wing extremist targeted Republican lawmakers, has also been cited as an incident of stochastic terrorism.
- Researchers at the Max Planck Institute for the Study of Crime, Security and Law have described several high-profile incidents as stochastic terror, including: the plot to kidnap Michigan Governor Gretchen Whitmer in 2020, the January 6 United States Capitol attack in 2021, and the 2022 Buffalo shooting.

More broadly, Gordon Woo has argued that the statistical dynamics of copycat terrorism (such as al-Qaeda's replication of suicide bombings, including the 2002 Bali nightclub attack) can be understood within a stochastic framework, even when no single rhetorical instigator is identifiable.

== Criticism and debate ==
Some commentators argue the term is deployed as a political cudgel. Scholars (including Amman, Melloy, and Angove) warn that the concept's scope and evidentiary standards are unsettled: recent critical surveys describe "stochastic terrorism" as variably defined, prone to rhetorical overreach, and difficult to operationalize without clear causal tests. A 2020 report from Dutch and Belgian researchers at RAND Europe found both parts of the term problematic, arguing "there are enough terms to describe the various aspects of the phenomenon." However, the authors conceded that no other phrases "cover[ed] the complex phenomenon that stochastic terrorism describes" and did not suggest an alternative.

In a 2019 piece for The Atlantic, Los Angeles litigator Ken White (a founder of the legal blog site Popehat) lambasted the notion that "stochastic terrorism is not free speech," arguing instead for a broad interpretation of the First Amendment which protects "the majority of contemptible, bigoted speech." Charles C. W. Cooke, writing for the National Review called stochastic terrorism "the latest faux-academic ruse to have polluted our national conversation and made us all a bit dumber." Citing the Brett Kavanaugh assassination plot and Representative Alexandria Ocasio-Cortez's 2023 claim that the GOP was engaging in stochastic terrorism, Cooke posited the term was being invoked hypocritically, to the detriment of "free debate."

== See also ==
- Accusation in a mirror – Hate speech incitement technique
- Association fallacy – Formal fallacy
- Conspiracy theory – Attributing events to an improbable conspiracy
- Dehumanization – Behavior or process that undermines individuality of and in others
- Demonization – Characterization of individuals, groups, or political bodies as evil
- Diffusion of responsibility – Sociopsychological phenomenon
- Doxing – Publication of private details
- Ethnic violence – Conflict between ethnic groups
- Extremism – Ideology considered far outside the mainstream
- False accusation – Claim or allegation of wrongdoing that is untrue
- Genocide justification – Claiming or arguing that a particular genocide is excusable or good
- Hate media – Communication medium promoting hatred
- Hate speech – Speech that expresses hatred towards individuals or groups
- Incitement to ethnic or racial hatred – Criminal offence in several countries
- Incitement to genocide – Crime against humanity under international law
- Incitement to terrorism – Category in some national legal systems
- Little Eichmanns – Small actions leading to complicity in evil
- Lone wolf terrorism – Self-planned terrorism
- Moral panic – Fear that some evil threatens society
- Online hate speech – Type of hate speech
- Political violence – Violence conducted with political goals
- Radicalization – Social process by which people arrive at extreme views
- Religious violence – Violence practiced in the name of religion
- Scapegoating – Practice of singling out any party for undeserved negative treatment or blame
- Sectarian violence – Violence motivated by conflict between sects of ideology or religion
- Terrorism and social media – Terrorism and mass media
- Two Minutes Hate – Daily mass ritual in Nineteen Eighty-Four
- Volksverhetzung – modern German legal principle against hate speech
