= Coles Whalen =

American singer-songwriter

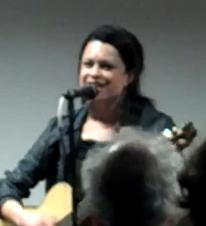
Coles Whalen live in Tucson

Coles Whalen is a pop and country singer-songwriter based in Denver. She has toured extensively through the United States and Canada and has released six independent records.

Whalen also composed and performed the soundtrack to Passport & Palette, a public television series, and is the voice of the Living Spaces 2010 ad campaign seen in Super Bowl XLIV. In 2009, a writer for the St. Joseph News-Press described her music as "evolving from a stereotypical emotive folksy singer-songwriter into an artist who dabbles in crafting melodic pop mixed with touches of alt-country, rock and jazz."

In January 2023, the Supreme Court of the United States agreed to review a particular case regarding the extent of First Amendment protection for threatening communications. Whalen was the recipient of the communications in the case.

== Personal background ==
Coles Whalen is based in Denver, Colorado. She began her performance career with the Colorado Children's Chorale and traveled with the group throughout the United States and to China. She attended Cherry Creek High School and graduated from the University of Southern California.

== Counterman v. Colorado ==
From 2014 to 2016, Whalen received thousands of messages sent by Billy Raymond Counterman to her Facebook account. Counterman was convicted of stalking via the true threats doctrine. In 2023, the case's appeal reached the Supreme Court of the United States, which wanted to decide whether or not the state needed to prove a specific mental state when prosecuting a true threat. In Counterman v. Colorado, the Supreme Court held that the State must prove that the threat was made recklessly, overturning Counterman's conviction and restarting the trial process.

Following the Supreme Court's decision to review the case, Whalen released a statement:

The thousands of unstable messages sent to me were life threatening and life altering. I was terrified that I was being followed and could be hurt at any moment; I had no choice but to step back from my dream, a music career that I had worked very hard to build. As the Supreme Court weighs this issue, I hope it will consider how dangerous stalking is for victims and their families all over this country. … I am grateful that when I reported these alarming messages, they were taken seriously …. If you are afraid – please – trust yourself and reach out for help.

== Appearances ==
South by Southwest 2016

Denver Pride Festival 2012 with En Vogue

HRC National Gala 2011
Phoenix Pride Festival 30th Anniversary 2010 with Joan Jett

Akon's Hitlab Showcase, Winner 2009

Taos Solar Music Festival 2008 with Paula Cole, John Butler Trio

== Discography ==
Stronger (Single) 2024

1. Stronger - seen in Stalking the Stars, MAX

Let's Be Lovers 2021

1. We're Gonna Make it Right
2. Let's Be Lovers
3. I'll Make a Change
4. Right Back to You
5. Getaway Car
6. Stop Drop and Roll
7. Love Me Loving You
8. Till the Next Life

Come Back, Come Back 2013

1. Catch Hold
2. Counting Down the Days
3. Cruel Game
4. There's Gotta Be
5. More Than the Immediate
6. Fairy Tale
7. Go Back
8. Tether
9. Phone Lines
10. On My Way to You

I Wrote This for You 2012

1. Cannonball
2. Average 20 Something
3. Beautiful Without Me
4. Cactus
5. Chasing Cars by Snow Patrol
6. So It Is
7. These Small Things
8. Wrecking Ball
9. Wake Up Easy
10. You'll Be There
11. Can't Take My Eyes Off of You
12. Paper Airplane
13. Second to None

The Whistle Stop Road Record 2010

1. Go Child
2. Whistle Stop
3. Butterflies
4. Hole in My Heart
5. Wrecking Ball
6. So It Is
7. Romeo and Juliet (by Mark Knopfler)
8. Average 20 Something
9. Call On Me
10. Wake Up Easy
11. Hurricane (Wicked Won Remix)

Nothing is Too Much 2008

1. Call on Me
2. How Do You Do This to Me
3. The Gettin' Side
4. When You Were Here
5. Honeyed Out

Gee Baby 2006

1. Shine
2. Manhattan
3. Turn Away
4. Ship That Sails The Sea
5. Twice
6. Weepin' Heart
7. Pretty Kids
8. Saint Tony
9. The Hand That Gives the Rose
10. Come Back for More
11. Sevens
12. Gee Baby

Coles Whalen: ep 2005

1. Why I Cry
2. Pick Up the Pieces
3. Sevens
4. Hollow Railroad
5. Providence
6. Old Man Reality

Songs for Sensational Kids Vol. 1: The Wiggly Scarecrow 2005
