= Issa (Senegalese singer) =

Senegalese singer

- Born: Amadou Issa Diop
- Origin: Dakar, Senegal
- Genres: contemporary R&B, pop, reggae
- Occupations: singer, songwriter, record producer
- Labels: Hitlab Music Company, Just 4 the Records

Issa (self-styled ISSA in caps or I$$A, pronounced "e-suh", stage name of Issa Diop) is a singer, songwriter, and record producer. Born in Dakar, Senegal, his musical style blends various styles, including contemporary R&B, pop, and reggae.

== Music career ==
Issa's self-titled debut EP, Issa, was released on 14 November 2007. International cable television broadcaster BET selected Issa as a "Ya Heard? Break-out Artist of the Month" in August 2008 for "Used to Be the One", the first official single and video from his upcoming album Rules of Attraction.

In July 2009, Issa performed in Portland, Oregon as the opening act for Cash Money Records recording artist Jay Sean's single release party for "Down" (featuring Lil Wayne), which peaked at Number 1 on the U.S. Billboard Hot 100 chart. He performed various songs from his upcoming album, including his latest single, "Blowin up My Phone."

In August 2009, Issa was selected by Portland radio station Jammin 107.5 as one of eight top finalists competing for a chance to open for LMFAO at their performance as part of the summer 2009 Dew Tour.

In January 2010, Akon announced Issa as the challenger artist to be featured during week 11 on Akon's new Hitlab Radio Show on Virgin Radio, in which Issa's single "Blowin up My Phone" was featured.

In August 2011, Akon signed Issa to the music label Hitlab Music Company. Issa performed with Akon during his 2011 Canada Tour in Montreal and Toronto.

== Education ==
Issa graduated from Portland State University in Portland, Oregon with a degree in business marketing in 2008.

== Awards and nominations ==
- 2008: BET Ya Heard? Break-out Artist of the Month (August 2008)
- 2009: LL Cool J's First Annual Boomdizzle All-Star Competition (Finalist)
- 2009: WiLD 107.5 Dew Tour Concert Competition (Finalist)
- 2010: WiLD 107.5 Open for Snoop Dogg Contest (Finalist)
- 2011: Akon's Show presented by Hitlab Music Company

== Discography ==
- 2007: Issa – EP
- 2008: "Used to Be the One" – single
- 2009: "Won't B Da Same" – single
- 2015: "All About You" feat. Zito – single
- 2015: "Wake up the Bea(S)T" – album
- 2015: "Good times (Before It All Ends)" – single
- 2015: "Sleep On You" feat. Tory Lanez – single
- 2017: "Bambi" – single
