= Preparation and attempt =

Preparation and attempt are related, but different standards in criminal law.

An attempt to commit an unconsummated crime may be viewed as having the same gravity as if the crime had occurred. Preparation that falls short of an actual attempt is less likely to be treated as equal in gravity to the crime, although it may be punishable in some other way.

Courts have not been able to draw a clear, bright line as to when acts committed in preparation for a crime are actually an attempt to commit the crime.

Some approaches, summarized in the case of United States v. Mandujano, include the physical proximity doctrine, the dangerous proximity doctrine, the indispensable element test, the probable desistance test, the abnormal step approach, and the uneqivocality test.

The Model Penal Code approach requires a substantial step, in addition to having a criminal purpose.
