= Threat =

Indication of intent of harm

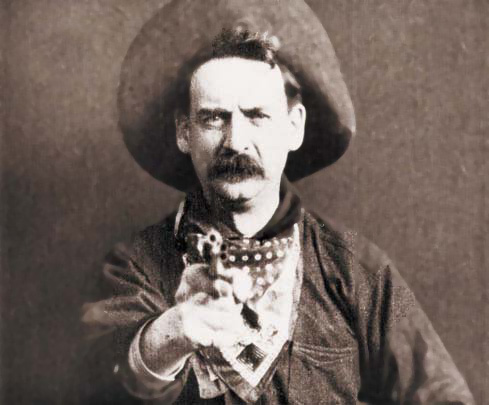
Threats can be subtle or overt. Actor Justus D. Barnes in The Great Train Robbery

A threat is a communication of intent to inflict harm or loss on another person. Intimidation is a tactic used between conflicting parties to make the other timid or psychologically insecure for coercion or control. The act of intimidation for coercion is considered a threat.

Threatening or threatening behavior (or criminal threatening behavior) is the crime of intentionally or knowingly putting another person in fear of bodily injury.

In business negotiation, threats include the prospects that one party will walk away from the negotiation, file a lawsuit, or damage the other party's reputation.

Some of the more common types of threats forbidden by law are those made with an intent to obtain a monetary advantage or to compel a person to act against their will. In most U.S. states, it is an offense to threaten to (1) use a deadly weapon on another person; (2) injure another's person or property; or (3) injure another's reputation.

== Law ==
=== Brazil ===
In Brazil, the crime of threatening someone, defined as a threat to cause unjust and grave harm, is punishable by a fine or three months to one year in prison, as described in the Brazilian Penal Code, article 147. Brazilian does not treat as a crime a threat that was proffered in a heated discussion.

=== Germany ===
The German Strafgesetzbuch § 241 punishes the crime of threat with a prison term for up to three years or a fine.

=== United States ===
In the United States, federal law criminalizes certain true threats transmitted via the U.S. mail or in interstate commerce. It also criminalizes threatening the government officials of the United States. Some U.S. states criminalize cyberbullying. Threats of bodily harm are considered assault.

==== State of Texas ====
In the state of Texas, it is not necessary that the person threatened actually perceive a threat for a threat to exist for legal purposes.

==== True threat ====
A true threat is threatening communication that can be prosecuted under the law. It is distinct from a threat that is made in jest. The U.S. Supreme Court has held that true threats are not protected under the U.S. Constitution based on three justifications: preventing fear, preventing the disruption that follows from that fear, and diminishing the likelihood that the threatened violence will occur.

== See also ==
- Anger
- Balance of threat
- Death threat
- Elonis v. United States
- Emotional blackmail
- Extortion
- Intimidation
- Non-credible threat
- Protection racket
- Threat (computer)
- Throffer
