= Timothy Masters =

Timothy Masters may refer to:

- Timothy Lee Masters, convicted and then exonerated in the Peggy Hettrick murder case
- Timothy Masters (rower) (born 1992), Australian rower
