= Holly Hargreaves-Cormany =

American psychologist

Holly Hargreaves-Cormany is an American psychologist who is most prominently known for her work on the sexual exploitation of juveniles, the association between animal cruelty and interpersonal violence, equine assisted therapy and humane education. As of 2024, she is an associate professor at Marymount University in the Forensic and Legal Psychology Program, is Co-Chair of the Animals and Interpersonal Violence Research Group in the American Psychological Association's Section on Human-Animal Interaction: Research and Practice, and serves as a Licensed Clinical Professional Counselor (LCPC) in both private practice and community counseling settings.

== Education ==
Hargreaves-Cormany received her B.A. in Psychology in December 2003, at the University of Kansas. Following that, she received her M.A. in Community Counseling in May 2007 at Marymount University, and in the following year, she received her second M.A. in Forensic Psychology in May 2008, also at Marymount University. She completed her studies in 2016 upon receiving her Ph.D. in Counseling from George Washington University. Under the guidance of her Dissertation Director, Sam Steen, her dissertation entitled Engendering Empathic Development and Pro-Social Responses in Elementary School Students Through a Humane Education Program examined the effectiveness of Washington Animal Rescue League's (WARL) Humane Education Program (HEP) on fourth-grade students, as well as the schools and communities they belong to. The conclusion of the study "resulted in positive outcomes for the participants and effected the desired outcomes aimed for within the mission of the WARL HEP." Richard Lanthier and Brandi Weiss also served as members of her dissertation committee.

== Career ==
While completing her Ph.D., Hargreaves-Cormany held the position as a Research Fellow at the Oak Ridge Institute for Science and Education from 2012 to 2016. After completing her Ph.D. in 2016, she returned to Marymount University as an Assistant Professor of Forensic and Legal Psychology. In 2022, she received tenure at Marymount and became an associate professor of forensic and legal psychology. Her teaching areas include subjects such as forensic assessment, psychology of criminal behavior and psychology, public policy, and the law.

== Research ==
In addition to her teaching, Hargreaves-Cormany has also published and conducted several studies, alongside presenting findings from her research at national and international conferences. In 2016, Hargreaves-Cormany published published two research articles pertaining to the sex trafficking of juveniles. One article, in partnership with Terri D. Patterson, the authors further developed a typology for offenders who engage in the sex trafficking of juveniles. Results from the study reveal that developmental factors likely explain differences between offender types, with age predicting increased alcohol use among sex trafficking survivors. Findings from qualitative interviews provided deeper insights into survivors' perspectives and helps to inform treatment and intervention options which may facilitate efforts to prevent and reduce harm towards juveniles. The second article, co-authored with Terri D. Patterson and Yvonne Muirhead, sought to construct a typology for offenders who commit sexual trafficking of juveniles. The conclusion of their study identified two general categories of sex trafficking offenders: 1) Aggressive/Antisocial and 2) Charismatic/Manipulative, each containing subtypes. Findings from this study also suggested that the Violent Charismatic/Manipulative offenders are the most dangerous to society.

In 2018, in collaboration with Tia Hoffer, Yvonne Muirhead and J. Reid Meloy, published a book titled Violence in animal cruelty offenders, which examined the relationship between animal cruelty and crimes against persons. Findings from this study provided a positive link between offenders engaging in animal cruelty and interpersonal violence, and explored other themes such as predatory and affective animal cruelty acts compared to offender characteristics.

In 2022, her research with Terri D. Patterson and Yvonne Muirhead (2016) was utilized in the book Psychopathy and Criminal Behavior: Current Trends and Challenges, alongside other researchers including James Beasley, Terri D. Patterson, Kara Meadows, Princess-Kasharáe Middleton, Ellen Wood, Jonathan Alicchio and Nathanael Gaspar. In the chapter they are mentioned in, a comprehensive review of current literature regarding psychopathy and human trafficking offenders was conducted.
