= Probable desistance test =

The probable desistance test is a standard for distinguishing between preparation and attempt in a criminal case. Under this standard, a person is guilty of attempt if they intended to commit a crime and acted in such a way that the offense would have been committed, but for intervention by some external factor not in the control of the defendant, such as being stopped by law enforcement. In United States v. Mandujano (1974), the U.S. Supreme Court wrote that under the probable desistance test, "the conduct constitutes an attempt if, in the ordinary and natural course of events, without interruption from an outside source, it will result in the crime intended".
