= Unequivocality test =

Standard for distinguishing between preparation and attempt in a criminal case

The unequivocality test is a standard for distinguishing between preparation and attempt in a criminal case. When a person's conduct, in itself, shows that the person unequivocally and without reasonable doubt, actually intends to carry out a crime, then the conduct is a criminal attempt to commit that crime.
