= Dangerous proximity doctrine =

Legal Standard

The dangerous proximity doctrine is an American standard for distinguishing between preparation and attempt in a criminal case. Under this standard, evidence that preparatory acts are an actual attempt is considered to be stronger if the offense is more probable and more grave or serious; if the defendant is nearer to completing the intended crime; and if the defendant's acts are likely to lead to the commission of the crime. However, the standard is not a clear bright line.

== History ==
The standard was advocated by Justice Oliver Wendell Holmes Jr while he was on the Massachusetts Supreme Judicial Court. While he did not use the exact phrase, Commonwealth v. Kennedy contains perhaps the earliest outline of the factors considered under the doctrine; the same factors were later used in deciding Commonwealth v. Peaslee. Justice Holmes continued to advocate for the test in his time on the United States Supreme Court, including in his dissent Hyde & Schneider v. United States, which has been cited to establish the doctrine under New York law.

The test has also been influential as a principle in the development of parts of the Model Penal Code. However, the Model Penal Code's drafters ultimately chose the broader substantial step doctrine. The dangerous proximity doctrine has significant similarities with the physical proximity doctrine, however, the dangerous proximity doctrine is slightly broader in that it does not require the defendant to be physically near the site of the intended crime.
