= Counterman v. Colorado =

- Supreme Court of the United States

Argued April 19, 2023 Decided June 27, 2023
- Full case name: Billy Raymond Counterman, Petitioner v. Colorado
- Docket no.: 22-138
- Citations: 600 U.S. 66 (more)
- Argument: Oral argument
- Opinion announcement: Opinion announcement

Holding
- In criminal cases about true threats, the First Amendment requires a state to prove that the defendant had some subjective understanding of the statements' threatening nature, and the defendant must have said the threat at least recklessly.

Court membership
- Chief Justice John Roberts Associate Justices Clarence Thomas · Samuel Alito; Sonia Sotomayor · Elena Kagan; Neil Gorsuch · Brett Kavanaugh; Amy Coney Barrett · Ketanji Brown Jackson

Case opinions
- Majority: Kagan, joined by Roberts, Alito, Kavanaugh, Jackson
- Concurrence: Sotomayor (in part and in judgment), joined by Gorsuch (Parts I, II, III-A and III-B)
- Dissent: Thomas
- Dissent: Barrett, joined by Thomas

Laws applied
- U.S. Const. amend. I

Counterman v. Colorado, 600 U.S. 66 (2023), is a United States Supreme Court case concerning the line between true threats of violence punishable as crimes and free speech protected by the First Amendment. The states and lower courts were divided over how to define the line. By a 7–2 majority, the court decided that statements are not protected if the defendant recklessly disregarded a substantial risk that their statements would be viewed as threatening.

Beginning in 2010, Billy Counterman sent thousands of messages to singer-songwriter Coles Whalen that foreboded her death and followed her activities. Counterman was convicted of stalking in Colorado, with his conviction left intact by the Colorado Court of Appeals and Colorado Supreme Court. Under Colorado law, statements were not protected under the First Amendment if a reasonable person would view the statements as threatening, with no need to prove that the speaker had subjective intent to threaten. Writing for the majority, Justice Elena Kagan wrote that there must be some subjective understanding of the threatening nature of the statements, but that a mental state of recklessness is sufficient, with no need for any more demanding form of subjective intent. Although the decision left Counterman vulnerable to conviction on retrial, some criticized it for declaring that stalking could be protected by the First Amendment.

== Background ==
=== State of the law ===
Although the First Amendment to the United States Constitution protects free speech, there are exceptions for incitement, defamation, obscenity, fighting words, and true threats. Before the Supreme Court ruling, there were conflicting standards in different states as well as federal appeals courts over how to determine whether a threatening statement was protected by the First Amendment. Some standards were based on whether a "reasonable person" would interpret the statement as threatening, known as an "objective" standard. Others were "subjective" standards based on the speaker's recklessness as to their statement's threatening nature, knowledge that their statement will be seen as a threat, or intent that their statement be a threat. Colorado used the reasonable-person standard.

=== Lower court history ===
Beginning in 2010, Billy Counterman sent thousands of Facebook messages to singer-songwriter Coles Whalen over a six-year period. His messages to her included "You're not being good for human relations. Die. Don't need you," "was that you in the white Jeep?", "staying in cyber life is going to kill you," and "seems like I'm being talked about more than I'm being talked to. This isn't healthy." She blocked him several times, but he created new accounts and continued sending messages. He was arrested in 2016 and prosecuted for stalking under Colorado law based on the messages he sent. He was convicted and sentenced to four and a half years of prison. Colorado did not present any evidence of physical stalking acts, such as following, at the trial; the lack of a proven physical act exposed the case to First Amendment review under the true threats doctrine because the proven criminal act involved only speech. The Colorado Court of Appeals affirmed his conviction in 2021 under the standard that a person could "reasonably perceive" that his threats were serious. The Colorado Supreme Court denied review.

== Supreme Court ==
The Supreme Court granted Counterman's petition for certiorari on January 13, 2023. The Biden administration submitted an amicus brief warning that "threats of violence against public officials in particular have proliferated in recent years, including threats against Members of Congress, judges, local officials, and election workers."

=== Oral arguments ===
Oral arguments were held on April 19, 2023. At oral arguments, Justice Clarence Thomas said, "we are more hypersensitive about different things now, and people can feel threatened in different ways." Justice Neil Gorsuch said, "we live in a world in which people are sensitive, and maybe increasingly sensitive. As a professor, you might have issued a trigger warning from time to time when you had to discuss a bit of history that's difficult or a case that's difficult. What do we do in a world in which reasonable people may deem things harmful, hurtful, threatening? And we're going to hold people liable willy-nilly for that?" Justice Amy Coney Barrett asked about if a professor gave a lecture "about just how vicious it was to be in a Jim Crow South and puts up behind them on a screen a picture of a burning cross and reads aloud some threats of lynching that were made at the time" and Black students interpret the lecture as a physical threat "because they don't understand it"? Chief Justice John Roberts made light of Counterman's messages, prompting laughter from other justices and the audience. Justice Elena Kagan said that from Whalen's perspective, Counterman's actions could "be objectively terrifying."

=== Opinion of the Court ===
Justice Elena Kagan delivered the majority opinion. In a 7–2 decision, she ruled that the Colorado Court of Appeals had erred in holding that the burden on the government to establish a statement as being a "true threat" was to prove that a reasonable person would understand his statements as threats. She stated that for "true threat" cases, the government must prove that the speaker was reckless in their comments but does not need to prove that the speaker intended harm with their comments. She wrote specifically that "the State must show that the defendant consciously disregarded a substantial risk that his communications would be viewed as threatening violence," and that "the State need not prove any more demanding form of subjective intent to threaten another." She explained that the recklessness standard involves "insufficient concern with risk, rather than awareness of impending harm."

Kagan vacated the judgment of the appeals court and remanded the case, which meant that the lower court would reconsider the case and could still convict Counterman if he was found guilty of stalking under the new standard set forth by the Supreme Court.

=== Concurrence ===
Justice Sonia Sotomayor concurred in the judgment, writing that "there is simply no need to reach out in this stalking case to determine whether anything more than recklessness is needed for punishing true threats generally." In Justice Sotomayor's view, because Counterman was prosecuted for stalking, fewer First Amendment concerns are raised because stalking need not be carried out through speech, the content of the communications is often irrelevant, and the risk of accidental liability is lower with a course of repeated unwanted conduct. Justice Neil Gorsuch joined her concurrence in part.

=== Dissent ===
Justice Amy Coney Barrett dissented, writing that the decision "unjustifiably grants true threats preferential treatment" and that, because the majority had decided the case as a First Amendment matter, the standard would apply to civil cases as well as criminal. Justice Clarence Thomas joined her dissent and separately wrote to address the majority's "surprising and misplaced reliance" on New York Times Co. v. Sullivan, the landmark 1964 Supreme Court case that raised the requirement for public figures to claim libel.

== Reaction ==
Law specialists said that the messages would probably still lead to reconviction under the new recklessness standard. Rhonda Saunders, a prosecutor specializing in stalking law, said that many states already had the recklessness doctrine in their laws but added that "I'm afraid police agencies and prosecutors are going to use [the Supreme Court decision] as an excuse not to do the job they are supposed to do." Annie Seifullah, a civil litigator and cyberbullying survivor, said that "as the dust settles, I believe we'll find that a lot of egregious behavior will still fall under this new standard. But some won't ... We need something more tailored to the actual harm here."

Law professor Mary Anne Franks, whose focus is cyberbullying, wrote that "the court ignores the reality that many stalkers fervently believe that their actions are or should be welcomed by their victims; indeed, the court's holding means that the more delusional the stalker, the more the stalking is protected." She stated that "the Supreme Court has declared stalking to be protected by the First Amendment" and that the decision "elevates stalkers into free speech heroes". Victims' rights advocate Lenora Claire said that "my phone is blowing up with victims who are absolutely terrified. If you even get as far as prosecution, you've already been through the gauntlet, navigating the restraining order process, convincing law enforcement to take you seriously."

Brian Hauss, senior staff attorney with the American Civil Liberties Union's Speech, Privacy, & Technology Project said that "we're glad the Supreme Court affirmed today that inadvertently threatening speech cannot be criminalized. In a world rife with misunderstandings and miscommunications, people would be chilled from speaking altogether if they could be jailed for failing to predict how their words would be received."

== See also ==
- Mens rea
- Elonis v. United States
