= Physical proximity doctrine =

The physical proximity doctrine is a standard in criminal law for distinguishing between preparation and attempt. "Physical" refers to the physical element of a criminal act (actus reus), as distinguished from the mental element of a guilty mind (mens rea). When a person makes preparation to commit a crime, and one of the preparatory acts is close or proximate to the completed crime, the preparation is considered to have merged into being an actual attempt. The standard is not a clear bright line standard. The closer the preparatory act is to the completed crime, the stronger the case for calling it an attempt. The determination as to whether the standard has been met is a matter for the jury to determine.
