= Publication cycle =

The publication cycle is the process through which authors take their ideas and put them into viewable form. This includes all forms of publication, from initial research reports to articles posted on websites, and commonly recognized magazine articles and books.

== Publication process ==
=== Idea ===
The cycle begins with the authors deciding on what topic they wish to publish about. This can be a very quick step for some authors, who decided on a topic and develop it more later in the process, or the author can take a large amount of time fully developing a complete idea.

=== Research ===
This is when authors take their ideas and find out all the information that is readily available. For scientific publication, this includes previously done experiments as well as conducting more experiments that focus mainly on the chosen topic. For literary authors, this step includes reading previous publications and to seeing if any other authors have published work similar to theirs.

=== Informal communication ===
Informal communication is when authors get together and exchange ideas without there being any formal purposes or any structured agenda to guide them along. This includes dinners, going to the bar, phone calls, parties, and small gatherings.

=== Idea protection ===
Idea protection is when authors formalize their ideas and reserve their rights to them. This includes patents, copyright, trademark, registered trademarks, and creative commons. It is important for authors to protect their work so that others do not take credit for their work.

=== Report findings ===
This can be done in many different ways. There are formal reports, such as lab reports, research documents, and other white paper publications. Informal versions include posts on personal web pages, blogs, and new forms like facebook posts.

=== Conferences ===
These meetings include both formal and inform forms of communication and are great ways not only to present your findings but also begin the cycle. Presentations and discussions are held to publicize research.

=== Magazines and newspapers ===
One of the more public and common types of publications, these are one of the most popular types of printed publications. These are used at many levels such as small towns, college campuses, and regional or national levels.

=== Journal articles ===
These vary a lot throughout their process, but they generally have the same objective in mind: to present an idea or position These can range from a personal to corporate journal and have many various subjects. Depending on the level, the journal article may be peer-reviewed by others in the field or a dedicated editing staff.

- Examples
- The Wall Street Journal
- Personal Diary

=== Book publication ===
This is possibly one of the longest processes due to the many levels of review that go into the production of a book. There are usually many editions of books because each must be reviewed and revised before it actually goes into production. Also, many revisions to manuscripts may be made because of grammatical errors or a focus that needs to be fleshed out in more detail.

=== Government documents ===
There are many varieties of these documents. They can range from bills, deeds, constitutions or government contracts. These carry the most complexity with them because it must be kept updated regularly to reflect the current version of the document. Amendments to government documents make these documents have a longer publication cycle than most other documents because they must constantly be revised and it has to publicly be known that an amendment has been added and usually there are a series of checks these documents must pass through before their publication cycle has ended.

== Types of publication ==
- Research reports are published when authors do experiments to help support their topics. Reports are generally a formal type of publications, but it depends on the author. Some authors simply publish research findings, without any detailed explanations or formal papers. Other authors will write up full reports, with all the findings, calculations, and conclusions drawn from the information found.
- Conference papers are published following conferences. Authors find these helpful, not only for reviewing what happened during the conference, but also finding out what happened at conferences they were unable to attend.
- Magazines and newspapers are some of the most commonplace publications that people think of. They are the main source of recent, up to date information that affects everyday life. These types of media are generally published from a day to a week after the event being reported on occurred. Daily newspapers operate on a 24-hour news cycle.
- Journals are slower to publish information, but are more reputable than magazines and newspapers. Journals go through a much more formal and strict review process to ensure that the information is authenticated and trustworthy.
- Books are the key publication type, used not only for information, but also telling stories, listing facts, and sharing opinions. Books go through a very long revision process which makes sure not only that all errors in the writing have been fixed, but also that there are no copyright infringements.
- Encyclopedias are similar to books because they have a complicated revision process, but because of the information contained in encyclopedias and because they are periodicals, they are different in how they function. When encyclopedias are republished, all that changes is the information that has been proven wrong or has altered since the last publication. But even so, they are not normally published more than once a year.

=== Online publication types ===
- Blogs are simply people or a corporation's ideas that are published throughout the internet. These are not usually edited and usually have the most interaction with readers. They usually employ comment boxes that allow for people to comment on. The more followers the blog has, the more credible it appears.
- Forums are usually for support or posting reviews and specific questions about a specific product or brand.
- E-Books (see E-Book) An electronic book (or e-book) is a book publication made available in digital form, consisting of text, images, or both, readable on the flat-panel display of computers or other electronic devices.
- Personal website are usually hosted by an individual. It usually reflects the interest of that individual and can have any variety content they see fit to host and have the rights to host.
- Corporate and government websites are usually contributed to expressly by employees of a particular company or department of the government. There is usually a small amount of funding that is solely devoted to the internet division of a particular camp. There is also a need to have servers and a large financial cost can be incurred due to the bandwidth that is needed because of the traffic that may travel to the page.
- Tutorials are simply videos or texts that demonstrate how to perform a particular task. These can be a part of a larger site, such as Youtube.com, where users are able to post content that other may critique and view.

== See also ==
- Information cycle
