= Abnormal step =

The abnormal step approach is a standard for distinguishing between preparation and attempt in a criminal case. If a person takes a series of steps in preparation for a crime, then takes a step that a normal noncriminal person would have come to their good senses and held back from taking (an abnormal step), then that is evidence of an attempt.

== See also ==
- Attempt
- Inchoate crime
