= Murder of Peggy Hettrick =

Unsolved 1987 murder in Colorado

People v. Masters
- Court: District Court, Larimer County, Colorado, U.S.
- Full case name: The People of the State of Colorado vs. Timothy Lee Masters
- Decided: March 26, 1999
- Citation: n° 98-CR-1149 (Colo. Dist.)

Case history
- Subsequent actions: Masters sentenced to life in prison without the possibility of parole; his sentence would be vacated in January 2008.; Affirmed, 33 P.3d 1191 (Colo. App. 2001); affirmed, 58 P.3d 979 (Colo. 2002); charges dropped in January 2008.; Civil proceedings initiated in federal court sub. nom. Masters v. Gilmore, 663 F.Supp.2d 1027 (D. Colo. 2009).

The Peggy Hettrick murder case concerns the unsolved 1987 death of Peggy Hettrick in Fort Collins, Colorado. Timothy Lee "Tim" Masters enlisted in the United States Navy following a high school career plagued by police accusation of murder when he was a sophomore at Fort Collins High School. After eight years in the Navy, he was honorably discharged. Masters worked for Learjet as an aviation mechanic until 1997, when he was arrested for the murder of Peggy Hettrick. He was charged and convicted of the Hettrick murder in 1999 and sentenced to life imprisonment without parole. His sentence was vacated in January 2008 when DNA evidence from the original crime scene indicated that he was not the responsible party. Three years after his release from prison, Masters was exonerated by the Colorado Attorney General on June 28, 2011. As of 2023, no one else has been charged with Hettrick's murder.

== Background ==
On the morning of February 11, 1987, a bicyclist investigated what he thought was a mannequin and discovered the dead body of 37-year-old Peggy Hettrick in a field in southern Fort Collins. According to the coroner, she died from a single stab wound in the upper left back, likely very early in the morning. Her body had been "sexually mutilated," with the precise removal of her left nipple and areola, as well as a female "circumcision", including what one doctor described as a partial vulvectomy; a procedure that requires high skill and quality surgical equipment to perform.

According to testimony, before the bicyclist found the body, 15-year-old Timothy Masters saw it while walking to school at daybreak and, thinking it was a mannequin left as a prank, did not report the body to the police. After Masters' father Clyde Masters told canvassing police that he had seen his son deviate from his usual path across the field to the bus that morning, police pulled Masters, then a 5 ft 10 in (1.78 m)-tall, 120 lb (54 kg) high school sophomore nicknamed "Toothpick", out of class for questioning.

== Investigation and conviction ==
Early in the investigation, lead investigator Fort Collins detective Jim Broderick centered on Masters as the primary suspect due to his failure to report the body found on his way to school. However, no physical evidence linking Masters to the crime was found.

On February 12, investigators searched his home, including the sinks, for blood, as well as his school locker. They found 2,200 pages of writings and violent artwork by Masters in his bedroom, backpack and school locker, along with a knife collection and pornography. The local newspaper with the account of the body's discovery was found on his dresser next to his knife collection. However, no trace of Hettrick's blood or hair was found in Masters' room or among his belongings, including his clothes and knife collection.

Despite hours of police questioning without an adult present, wherein policemen repeatedly told Masters they knew he'd committed the murder, the 15-year-old Masters maintained his innocence. The adolescent was administered a polygraph test after police interrogation; the results were inconclusive.

Over 1,000 pages of Masters' violent artwork were admitted into evidence.

Two hairs were found on Hettrick, but they did not match Masters. Investigators also found unknown fingerprints in Hettrick's purse, but these did not match Masters either. With no new leads, and following consultation with the FBI Behavioral Science Unit, investigators planted an article containing false information in the local newspaper on February 12, 1988, in an attempt to provoke an incriminating reaction from Masters. Around-the-clock police surveillance of Masters saw no reaction. Masters maintained his innocence during periodic police interviews during his high school and Navy years.

In 1992, during an interview with a former fellow high school student, investigators discovered that Masters told his friends details about the sexual mutilations. The investigators thought this information had never been made public or disclosed to Masters or his defense attorneys; they thought that only the killer would know those details. Investigators interviewed Masters again in Philadelphia, where he was serving in the Navy. He told investigators that a friend in his art class told him about the mutilations. The friend had been part of a group of Explorer Scouts helping the police search the crime scene, and he was told of the nature of the mutilations early in the investigation. His story checked out and the investigation reached a dead end until 1997, when Broderick contacted a forensic psychologist from California, Dr. J. Reid Meloy.

Meloy analyzed Masters's writings and artwork extensively and concluded (without having ever spoken to Masters, which he could not since Masters was protected by his Fifth Amendment rights) that some of the drawings represented Masters reliving the crime.

Based largely on Meloy's testimony about Masters's drawings, including one that Meloy interpreted as a knife cutting into a vagina and another drawing of a body being dragged, Masters was convicted in 1999 of Hettrick's murder and sentenced to life in prison. Though some jurors had doubts about his guilt, the drawings and writings shown to the jury were cited by jury members as compelling evidence against him.

=== Appeals ===
Soon after his conviction, Masters appealed to the Colorado Court of Appeals on the grounds that his drawings were inadmissible under rules of the court, as was testimony concerning a confrontation between Masters and a teacher before the murder occurred. Masters's defense team also objected to the testimony by Dr. Meloy. The Colorado Court of Appeals unanimously upheld his conviction on February 15, 2001.

In 2002, the Colorado Supreme Court granted certiorari to determine whether evidence supposedly suggestive of Masters's violent nature, which was fundamental to the prosecution in securing a conviction, was improperly admitted. Finding that some evidence should have, in fact, been suppressed, the Court, nevertheless, determining the error to be harmless, affirmed the lower court's finding. On December 16, 2002, the Colorado Supreme Court denied a petition for rehearing in the case, effectively ending his first appeal.

In 2004 Masters mounted another appeal on the grounds of ineffective counsel. The state appointed a new defense team who immediately began investigating the case. The defense team discovered that evidence, including the hairs found on Hettrick and photographs of the fingerprints found in her purse, was missing. During 2007 hearings, the defense alleged police and prosecutorial misconduct in the investigation and trial. The defense argued that Jim Broderick perjured himself during the 1999 trial concerning his involvement in the case, and that prosecutors allegedly withheld evidence about links to Dr. Richard Hammond, a potential suspect in the murder.

=== Release ===
In early 2008, special prosecutors assigned to the case agreed that critical information was not turned over to the original defense team. On January 18, 2008, defense attorneys released evidence that further suggested Masters's innocence. Defense attorneys had touch DNA testing done in the Netherlands on evidence found at the scene, but tested samples did not include Masters's DNA. Rather, the DNA results pointed to Hettrick's sometime boyfriend. Special prosecutors assigned to the appeal recommended overturning Masters's sentence as a result of the DNA findings. The DNA results were confirmed by the Colorado Bureau of Investigation.

On January 22, 2008, a Colorado judge vacated Masters's conviction and ordered him released immediately. On February 5, 2008, District Attorney Larry Abrahamson and the Eight Judicial Circuit held proceedings to decide whether to retry Masters or to drop all charges against him. Prosecutors filed a motion to dismiss murder charges against Masters on January 26, 2008, though at the time the Larimer County District Attorney stated that Masters had not been exonerated for the crime.

In an announcement on June 28, 2011, Colorado Attorney General John Suthers said Masters was no longer a suspect in the 1987 murder of Peggy Hettrick of Fort Collins and had been fully exonerated. Suthers stated, "Pursuant to the mandate from the Governor's Office, our team undertook a comprehensive review of the entire Hettrick homicide," Suthers said in a statement. "Our team conducted more than 170 interviews and conducted further DNA analysis. Throughout the past year, the Statewide Grand Jury heard evidence and testimony from numerous witnesses. Based on the testimony, the forensic analysis and the crime scene analysis, the overwhelming conclusion is that Timothy Masters was not involved in the murder of Peggy Hettrick."

He continued: "Masters cooperated fully with our investigation, including the Grand Jury proceedings. Given the nature and extent of the Grand Jury investigation, the time has come for law enforcement to officially exonerate Timothy Masters. The Hettrick case remains open. We have made significant progress in the investigation. Our team will continue to develop evidence and we will continue to work on this case until the murderer is brought to justice. Too many lives have been affected by the events of that day. Justice requires that we continue to diligently work on the case."

== Alternate suspects ==
=== Dr. Richard Hammond ===
In 1995, seven years after the murder and two years before the retention of experts for the Masters's trial, Dr. Richard Hammond, an eye surgeon, was arrested for secretly filming women's genitalia, including that of his own female family members, through fake ventilation grates in his downstairs bathroom. The cameras were positioned to allow for detailed, closeup viewing of the women's genitals while sitting on the toilet. Investigators also found that Hammond kept thousands of dollars' worth of pornography hidden in a locked office and in a storage shed in town, indicating an obsession with female genitalia. As a surgeon, Hammond had the skill and equipment to perform the precision mutilation found on Hettrick's body. In 1987, Hammond's bedroom window overlooked the location where Hettrick's body was discovered, and he was home the morning after the murder, despite his usually scheduled surgeries on that day of the week. Hammond committed suicide in March 1995, several days after his arrest for the secret filming of the females. The police were called to a La Quinta Motor Inn in north Denver. There, they found Hammond dead, an IV needle containing cyanide residue sticking out of his thigh. "My death should satisfy the media's thirst for blood," he wrote in the suicide note.

Though investigators noted a possible link between Hammond and the Hettrick murder, no follow up investigation was done. Broderick ordered evidence in the Hammond case destroyed before it could be examined for any link with Hettrick based upon the premise that he had committed suicide and there was no criminal investigation that would begin. The arrest of Dr. Hammond, and his subsequent suicide, was information withheld from Dr. Meloy and the other experts, and the FBI was not informed of this case by Larimer County to reconsider their profiling of Mr. Masters from 1987.

=== Matthew Zoellner ===
The DNA testing that led to the 2008 overturning of Masters's conviction also implicated Hettrick's sometime boyfriend, Matt Zoellner, a young used car salesman, who testified at Masters's trial. Zoellner was initially a suspect in 1987, but was quickly ruled out. Officials in 2008 said they planned to renew the investigation.

== Aftermath ==
Colorado law had no requirement that evidence be preserved, and shields liability to authorities who destroy evidence after criminal trials are complete. Partially as a result of this case, Colorado lawmakers passed H.B. 1397, which requires the preservation of all evidence that may contain DNA that is collected in cases resulting in a conviction for a Class 1 felony or a sex offense. The evidence must be preserved for the life of the defendant, after which the evidence may be destroyed. If charges have not been filed, DNA evidence must be preserved for the length of the investigation.

In June 2008, after a six-month review of the case, Weld County District Attorney Ken Buck determined that police had acted inappropriately (misfeasance), but not criminally (malfeasance). "Buck was responsible for determining whether Broderick broke any laws, but in a letter to Chief Judge James H. Hiatt, he said it was important to give context of the overall case, which he used to reach his conclusions. 'After consideration of the evidence, I did not discover criminal conduct among employees of the Fort Collins Police Department or the prosecutors in the case,' Buck wrote." Buck also noted that the statute of limitations had expired.

On October 21, 2008, David Lane, a criminal defense attorney in Denver, filed a civil suit in federal district court against the Larimer County prosecutors, Terry Gilmore and Jolene Blair, as well as against detective James Broderick, alleging violations of Masters's civil rights. In their legal brief are facts concerning the Masters case, including withholding evidence from Dr. Meloy and other expert witnesses (including a surgeon consultant and a criminalist), and interference with the sharing of evidence among expert witnesses that would cast doubt on Masters's involvement in Hettrick's homicide and would have pointed toward other suspects. No information on the other suspects, including their existence, was provided to the experts at the time of their retention. The county settled with Masters for US$4.1 million and the City of Fort Collins settled for US$5.9 million, for a total of US$10 million.

The original Masters case was prosecuted by then deputy District Attorneys Terry Gilmore and Jolene Blair, who were elevated to district judgeship soon after. On September 9, 2008, the Colorado Supreme Court censured Gilmore and Blair. In an agreement with the Colorado Supreme Court's Office of Attorney Regulation, Gilmore and Blair acknowledged failing to ensure that Masters's defense attorneys received large amounts of the information which had been obtained by the Fort Collins Police Department, including many key pieces indicating Masters's innocence. In addition, the prosecutors failed to gather other information from police, despite indications that it existed.

In the General Election of November 2, 2010, Judges Blair and Gilmore were voted out of office, receiving less than 40% of the vote in the 8th Judicial District; their tenures ended on January 11, 2011.

On June 30, 2010, a Larimer County Grand Jury under the direction of neighboring Weld County District Attorney Ken Buck's office indicted Lt. James Broderick on eight counts of felony first-degree perjury for materially false statements he made pursuant to the arrest and conviction of Masters. Count 1, concerning an affidavit for Masters' arrest, was dismissed by Weld County District Judge James Hartmann in the January 26, 2011 ruling, "People v. Broderick," in a section entitled "Bronston Principles."

On May 9, 2011, all remaining charges were dismissed by a ruling from Weld County District Judge James Hartmann that the 3-year statute of limitations for perjury in Colorado had expired. Weld County then-District Attorney Ken Buck, who handled the prosecution of the Broderick case, said he was evaluating the judge's order and "will proceed with Broderick's prosecution if legally appropriate". Buck's options included a direct appeal to the Colorado Supreme Court, as well as filing a reconsider motion with the original judge which would include a clarification of the timeline in the case.

On July 29, 2011, a different Larimer County Grand Jury under the direction of Weld County District Attorney Ken Buck's office, re-indicted Lt. James Broderick on nine counts of perjury. Broderick faced up to six years in prison for each count if convicted. Those charges also were dismissed. In 2013, Broderick resigned to avoid an internal investigation into his handling of the Hettrick murder. Fort Collins has reportedly spent $400,000 to date to defend Broderick. Charges against him were dismissed in 2013.

A detailed forensic study that included the investigative methods used in the Hettrick murder case was published in 2009. In June 2012, Berkley Books published Drawn to Injustice, a book co-written by Timothy Masters and Steve Lehto, which tells the story from Masters' perspective.

== Cold Case Files ==
A&E's true crime television documentary series, Cold Case Files, produced and narrated by Bill Kurtis featured a 1999 episode, Murder Illustrated, that dealt with the Peggy Hettrick case. The episode labeled Masters a murderer and congratulated the Fort Collins Police Department and District Attorney's office for a job well done. Since Masters's exoneration, the episode has been withdrawn from syndication, although it remains available on DVD. Kurtis refused to comment on the episode.

== See also ==
- Crime in Colorado
- List of unsolved murders (1980–1999)
- Overturned convictions in the United States
