= Information cycle =

The term information cycle refers to the way information is processed and distributed and how it changes over time. It is usually used to describe the progression of media coverage relating to a particular newsworthy event or topic during which information goes through various stages of reporting and publication.

In the cycle model, information begins circulation with a news story presented via the Internet, television, radio, or newspaper, followed by its release in magazines. The information is then researched by scholars and published in academic journals or books and presented at academic conferences. Finally, if the information is considered important enough, it is included in reference works such as handbooks and encyclopedias.

As information passes through these stages, its content and presentation changes. Initial news coverage may take place as events unfold, and offer only the basics in terms of "who, what, when, and where." News magazines will provide more background information, adding the fifth W, "why," especially in less frequently appearing or specialized periodicals. As more time passes, scholars will research the information and write detailed studies that take historical context and long-term meaning into account. Finally, after a few years, books regarding the information may appear.

Understanding the information cycle helps aid researchers and academics in determining the validity of source material. For instance, the cycle model is commonly taught in library education. Information flow in this model can be thought of as a cycle because, conceptually, the published information might spark new ideas which will pass through similar stages.

== See also ==
- Information
- Research
- Publication cycle
