= Indispensable element test =

The indispensable element test is a standard for distinguishing preparation and attempt in a criminal case. A person who does every act needed to commit a crime, except for one necessary or indispensable element, is not guilty of having made an attempt.
