= J. Reid Meloy =

American forensic psychologist

- Occupations: Forensic psychologist, professor, consultant

Academic background
- Education: College of Wooster; University of Illinois Chicago; McCormick Theological Seminary; United States International University

Academic work
- Discipline: Forensic Psychology
- Institutions: University of California, San Diego

J. Reid Meloy is a forensic psychologist and academic known for his work in psychopathy, stalking, and threat assessments. Meloy is a former clinical professor of psychiatry at the University of California, San Diego, School of Medicine and faculty member of the San Diego Psychoanalytic Center. Meloy has served as a consultant since 2002 for the Federal Bureau of Investigation's Behavioral Analysis Unit, and has consulted on many criminal and civil cases as an expert witness.

== Education ==
Meloy received a B.A. in history at the College of Wooster in 1971. He went on to obtain a M.S.W in clinical social work from the University of Illinois in 1974. In 1975, he completed his second graduate degree, receiving a Master of Divinity in Theology from the McCormick Theological Seminary. Six years later, Meloy would obtain his Ph.D. in clinical psychology from the United States International University in 1981. He is an Academic Graduate of the San Diego Psychoanalytic Center.

== Career ==
Meloy started in psychiatric social work and worked both in private and public practice in clinics and day treatment centers in Chicago and San Diego. In 1982, after receiving his Ph.D., Meloy became the director of the Psychiatric Security Unity at the San Diego County Detention Facility. Meloy held this position until 1986 when he became Chief of the Forensic Mental Health Division of San Diego County Health Services. In that capacity, he established and expanded mental health programs for men and women in custody and on probation, including the Conditional Release Program for insanity acquittees and the Forensic Evaluation Unit for court-ordered evaluations for the Superior Court of San Diego County.

Meloy left public service in 1995 and established a consulting corporation in forensic psychology. Since 2002, he has consulted with the FBI's Behavioral Analysis Unit in Quantico on criminal, counterterrorism, and counterintelligence cases. Between 2002-2010 he was a member of the Fixated Research Group for the United Kingdom's Home Office, researching threats to the British Royal Family. This research, producing multiple scientific studies, led to the establishment of the Fixated Threat Assessment Center next to Buckingham Palace. This model program has since been replicated in the Netherlands, Australia, and other countries. Meloy consulted on the TV program CSI from its inception in 2001 until the end of the series in 2015, and has also appeared in various other media productions, including "bin Laden's Hard Drives" in 2022 produced by Peter Bergen, and "Indivisible," a Paramount+ series on the origins of the Jan. 6, 2021 attack on the U.S. Capitol. He is intermittently quoted in the New York Times, the New Yorker, NPR, Washington Post, and the Wall Street Journal. Meloy has historically been retained by both the prosecution and the defense on various criminal and civil cases, typically involving single or multiple homicide victims. He continues to consult on threat cases for corporations, foundations, colleges, universities, federal agencies, and public figures.

== Teaching ==
Meloy has held several teaching positions throughout his career, including a voluntary clinical appointment as a professor of psychiatry at the University of California, San Diego School of Medicine. Meloy remains as a faculty member at the San Diego Psychoanalytic Center.

== Research ==
Meloy has authored, co-authored, or edited over 260 articles and 14 books. His research has focused on stalking, personality disorders, psychopathy, narcissism, criminality, mental disorders, lone actor terrorism and targeted violence. Following the terrorist attacks on 9/11, Meloy broadened his research to aid in the assessment of risk for terrorist attacks and more generally workplace and campus violence mass murderers. Meloy has developed two risk assessments: Workplace Assessment of Violence Risk (WAVR-21) with Dr. Stephen White and the Terrorist Radicalization Assessment Protocol (TRAP-18). The TRAP-18 continues to be the most validated risk assessment instrument concerning lone actor targeted attacks, and is widely used in North America, Europe, Australia, New Zealand, and South Africa.

Meloy is a founding associate editor of the Journal of Threat Assessment and Management. He was the Secretary, Vice President, and President of the American Academy of Forensic Psychology 1992-1998.

Meloy was the Yochelson Visiting Scholar at Yale University in March, 2015.

== High profile cases ==
Meloy has been retained as a consultant or an expert witness on a number of high profile cases, including the murder of Polly Klaas by Richard Allen Davis, the stalking of the pop singer Madonna and the film star Gwyneth Paltrow, the Oklahoma City bombing cases in the prosecution of Timothy McVeigh and Terry Nichols, as well as an erotomania case in Michigan, where an Army veteran opened fire inside a Ford manufacturing facility, killing a man and wounding three others.

== Controversy ==
=== Wrongful conviction of Timothy Masters ===
On February 11, 1987, Peggy Hettrick's body was found in a Fort Collins, Colorado field by a bicyclist. Timothy Masters, a fifteen-year-old who lived near the field, was brought in for questioning after he claimed to have seen a mannequin on his walk to school that morning. Masters consented to a search of his backpack, locker, and bedroom. During the search, police recovered knives, swords, pornography, maps of the crime scene, and over 2000 pages of graphic drawings and writings. Many of the writings and drawings depicted hatred for women and individuals being stabbed in the back, which resembled that of Hetrrick's murder.

In 1997, Meloy was brought in as a consultant in the case. Meloy concluded that Masters' illustrations and narratives could represent depictions of the crime scene and also rehearsal fantasy, particularly explicit drawing of a body being dragged by another person. He gave no testimony concerning the guilt or innocence of Masters, and offered no testimony to the jury concerning a possible motivation if it was determined that Masters was guilty. Using Meloy's testimony and the drawings and the knives in his possession, Masters was found guilty in 1999 and sentenced to life in prison. The verdict was upheld by the Colorado Supreme Court.

Masters filed for an appeal of his conviction in 2007 which was later denied. His lawyers petitioned for a new trial which would allow for DNA testing to be brought in as evidence. On January 2, 2008, it was revealed that reports from two experts contradicting that of Meloy's was withheld from Masters defense and unknown to Meloy. Later that month, DNA results indicated that Masters DNA was not found on the body nor at the crime scene. Based upon these findings, the court dismissed the charges against Masters and he was released after 9 years in custody.

In the subsequent civil suit filed by Masters against the Ft. Collins prosecutors and police, it was discovered that they had withheld exculpatory evidence from Meloy and other experts, including information on a primary suspect who had committed suicide prior to Meloy's retention on the case, an ophthalmologist who lived close to the location of the body. Meloy provided an affidavit in the civil suit on behalf of Masters, stating that this new exculpatory evidence would have altered his opinions. Masters was awarded $10 million, and the lead detective on the case was charged with multiple felony counts of perjury. The prosecutors who had subsequently become judges were removed from their positions by the voters in Colorado.

== Significant books ==
- Meloy, J. R. (1988). The psychopathic mind: Origins, dynamics, and treatment. Jason Aronson.
- Meloy, J.R. (Ed). (1992). "Violent attachments," Aronson.
- Gacono, C.B. & Meloy, J.R. (1994). Rorschach assessment of aggressive and psychopathic personalities. Lawrence Erlbaum Associates.
- Meloy, J.R., Acklin, M., Gacono, C., Murray, S. & Peterson, C. (1997). Contemporary Rorschach interpretation. Laawrence Erlbaum Associates.
- Meloy, J. R. (Ed). (1998). The psychology of stalking: Clinical and forensic perspectives. Academic Press, Inc.
- Meloy, J. R. (2000). Violence risk and threat assessment: A practical guide for mental health and criminal justice professionals. Specialized Training Services.
- Meloy, J.R. (2001). The mark of Cain: Psychoanalytic insight and the psychopath. The Analytic Press.
- Meloy, J.R., Sheridan, L. & Hoffmann, J. (2008). Stalking, threatening, and attacking public figures. Oxford Univ. Press.
- Meloy, J.R. & Hoffmann, J. (eds.) (2014). International handbook of threat assessment. Oxford Univ. Press.
- Meloy, J.R. & Hoffmann, J.(eds). (2021). International handbook of threat assessment, 2nd ed. Oxford Univ. Press.

== Awards ==
Meloy was awarded the Association of Threat Assessment's National Achievement Award in 1998. In 1999, he received the William T. Rossiter Award from the Forensic Mental Health Association of California. His latest awards, the American Academy of Forensic Psychology's Distinguished Contributions to Forensic Psychology award and the Manfred Guttmacher Award from the American Psychiatric Association were both presented to Meloy in 2022.
