= Forensic Mental Health Association of California =

The Forensic Mental Health Association of California (FMHAC) is a member based non-profit providing resources and education to professionals working in the forensic mental health field. The FMHAC also sponsors an annual conference in the Monterey Bay area. The conference aims to provide a forum for discussion between professionals from the varied disciplines involved in providing mental healthcare to incarcerated patients, educate professionals in forensic mental health on the most current best practices, share innovations and successful program models such as behavioral health Courts and CIT, and improve the mental healthcare provided to incarcerated patients.
