= United States v. Mandujano =

- Supreme Court of the United States

Argued November 5, 1975 Decided May 19, 1976
- Full case name: United States v. Mandujano
- Docket no.: 74-754
- Citations: 425 U.S. 564 (more) 96 S. Ct. 1768; 48 L. Ed. 2d 212

Case history
- Prior: United States District Court for the Western District of Texas, 365 F. Supp. 155 (W.D. Tex. 1973), Count 1, attempted distribution of heroin: Conviction (without use of Mandujano’s grand jury testimony). Count 2, making false representations: thrown out. United States Court of Appeals for the Fifth Circuit, 496 F.2d 1050 (5th Cir. 1974), affirmed.
- Subsequent: remanded to district court United States Court of Appeals for the Fifth Circuit 539 F.2d 106 (5th Cir. 1976)

Holding
- It is not necessary to provide full Miranda warnings to a person called to testify before a grand jury and false statements given during that testimony may not be suppressed in a subsequent prosecution for perjury.

Court membership
- Chief Justice Warren E. Burger Associate Justices William J. Brennan Jr. · Potter Stewart; Byron White · Thurgood Marshall; Harry Blackmun · Lewis F. Powell Jr. William Rehnquist · John P. Stevens

Case opinions
- Majority: Burger, joined by White, Powell, Rehnquist
- Concurrence: Brennan, joined by Marshall
- Concurrence: Stewart, joined by Blackmun
- Stevens took no part in the consideration or decision of the case.

United States v. Mandujano, 425 U.S. 564 (1976), was a United States Supreme Court case that determined that it is not necessary to provide full Miranda warnings to a person called to testify before a grand jury; and that false statements given during that testimony may not be suppressed in a subsequent prosecution for perjury.

== Background ==
In 1973, Roy Mandujano negotiated with an undercover narcotics officer to purchase an ounce of heroin for six hundred fifty dollars. The transaction was never completed. Mandujano was then called before the grand jury, where he testified regarding his familiarity of the heroin industry in San Antonio, Texas. He was not given Miranda warnings before testifying.

After his testimony, Mandujano was arrested for 1) attempted distribution of heroin and 2) perjury, but the United States District Court for the Western District of Texas suppressed the grand jury statements on the grounds that Mandujano was entitled to Miranda warnings before his testimony. Thus, the perjury charge was thrown out; however, Mandujano was convicted of the distribution charge. The United States Court of Appeals for the Fifth Circuit affirmed the decision to throw out the perjury charges on June 28, 1974.

== Supreme Court decision ==
The decisions by the District Court and Appellate Court to throw out the perjury charges were reversed and remanded by the Supreme Court. The Supreme Court determined that the grand jury is an integral part of the United States constitutional heritage which was brought with the common law. Furthermore, the grand jury serves as a barrier to reckless or unfounded charges.

Miranda warnings are aimed at the evils seen by the Court as endemic to police interrogation of a person in custody. The Court considers it unlikely that a grand jury will abuse powers as police sometimes do. Therefore, it is not necessary to provide full Miranda warnings to a person called to testify before the grand jury. Furthermore, false statements given during that testimony may not be suppressed in a subsequent prosecution for perjury.

However, the Court did not decide whether a suspect questioned before a grand jury had a right to be warned of their Fifth Amendment right against self-incrimination. The defendant in this case received such a warning.

== Fifth Circuit guidance on defining "attempt" ==
On August 19, 1974, the Fifth Circuit Court of appeals affirmed Mandujano's conviction of attempted distribution of heroin. This case is worth noting for how the United States Court of Appeals for the Fifth Circuit summarized approaches to defining what constitutes an "attempt" to commit a crime. Attempt has two elements, intent, and some conduct toward completion of the crime. This part of the opinion by the appellate court was not overturned by the Supreme Court decision.
