= True threat =

Threat that is not protected speech under US law

A true threat is a threatening communication that can be prosecuted under the law. It is distinct from a threat that is made in jest, or a threatening remark that no reasonable person would perceive to be a genuine threat, intended to be acted upon. The U.S. Supreme Court has held that true threats are not protected under the U.S. Constitution based on three justifications: preventing fear, preventing the disruption that follows from that fear, and diminishing the likelihood that the threatened violence will occur. There is some concern that even satirical speech could be regarded as a "true threat" due to concern over terrorism.

The true threat doctrine was established in the 1969 Supreme Court case Watts v. United States. In that case, an eighteen-year-old male was convicted in a Washington, D.C. District Court for violating a statute prohibiting persons from knowingly and willfully making threats to harm or kill the President of the United States.

The conviction was based on a statement made by Watts, in which he said, "[i]f they ever make me carry a rifle the first man I want to get in my sights is L.B.J." Watts appealed, leading to the Supreme Court finding the statute constitutional on its face, but reversing the conviction of Watts.

In reviewing the lower court's analysis of the case, the Court noted that "a threat must be distinguished from what is constitutionally protected speech." The Court recognized that "uninhibited, robust, and wide open" political debate can at times be characterized by "vehement, caustic, and sometimes unpleasantly sharp attacks on government and public officials." In light of the context of Watts' statement - and the laughter that it received from the crowd - the Court found that it was more "a kind of very crude offensive method of stating a political opposition to the President" than a "true threat."

In so holding, the Court established that there is a "true threat" exception to protected speech, but also that the statement must be viewed in its context and distinguished from protected hyperbole. The opinion, however, stopped short of defining precisely what constituted a "true threat."

Traditionally, the standard for whether a true threat could be punished was based its effect on a "reasonable person" in the shoes of the person who received the threat. In 2023, Counterman v. Colorado established an additional "subjective" test that required a state to show evidence that the accused subjectively understood the nature of their threat and consciously, recklessly disregarded that nature. It did not remove the requirement to prove that a reasonable person would feel threatened. It just added that the accused also has to have a subjective belief that their statements could be construed as threats.

== See also ==
- Elonis v. United States
- Clear and present danger
- Imminent lawless action
