= Elonis v. United States =

- Supreme Court of the United States

Argued December 1, 2014 Decided June 1, 2015
- Full case name: Anthony Douglas Elonis, Petitioner v. United States
- Docket no.: 13-983
- Citations: 575 U.S. 723 (more) 135 S. Ct. 2001; 192 L. Ed. 2d 1
- Opinion announcement: Opinion announcement

Holding
- A court's instruction that requires only negligence with respect to the communication of a threat is not sufficient to support a conviction under 18 U.S.C. § 875(c). Third Circuit reversed and remanded.

Court membership
- Chief Justice John Roberts Associate Justices Antonin Scalia · Anthony Kennedy; Clarence Thomas · Ruth Bader Ginsburg; Stephen Breyer · Samuel Alito; Sonia Sotomayor · Elena Kagan

Case opinions
- Majority: Roberts, joined by Scalia, Kennedy, Ginsburg, Breyer, Sotomayor, Kagan
- Concur/dissent: Alito
- Dissent: Thomas

Laws applied
- 18 U.S.C. § 875(c)

Elonis v. United States, 575 U.S. 723 (2015), was a United States Supreme Court case concerning whether conviction of threatening another person over interstate lines (under 18 U.S.C. § 875(c)) requires proof of subjective intent to threaten or whether it is enough to show that a "reasonable person" would regard the statement as threatening. In controversy were the purported threats of violent rap lyrics written by Anthony Douglas Elonis and posted to Facebook under a pseudonym. The ACLU filed an amicus brief in support of the petitioner. It was the first time the Court has heard a case considering true threats and the limits of speech on social media.

== Background ==
In May 2010, Elonis was in the process of divorce and made a number of public Facebook posts. Prior to his postings, he had lost his job at an amusement park.

He "posted the script of a sketch" by The Whitest Kids U' Know, which originally referenced saying "I want to kill the President of the United States" and replaced the president with his wife:

Did you know that it's illegal for me to say I want to kill my wife?
It's illegal.
It's indirect criminal contempt.
It's one of the only sentences that I'm not allowed to say.
Now it was okay for me to say it right then because I was just telling you that it's illegal for me to say I want to kill my wife ...
Um, but what's interesting is that it's very illegal to say I really, really think someone out there should kill my wife. ...
But not illegal to say with a mortar launcher.
Because that’s its own sentence. ...
I also found out that it’s incredibly illegal, extremely illegal to go on Facebook and say something like the best place to fire a mortar launcher at her house would be from the cornfield behind it because of easy access to a getaway road and you’d have a clear line of sight through the sun room. ...
Yet even more illegal to show an illustrated diagram. [Here Elonis posted an illustrated diagram]

Elonis ended the post with this statement: "Art is about pushing limits. I'm willing to go to jail for my constitutional rights. Are you?"

A week later, Elonis posted about local law enforcement and a kindergarten class, which caught the attention of the Federal Bureau of Investigation. Then, he wrote a post on Facebook about one of the agents who visited him:

Took all the strength I had not to turn the bitch ghost
Pull my knife, flick my wrist, and slit her throat
Leave her bleedin’ from her jugular in the arms of her partner ...

He concluded:

And if you really believe this shit
I'll have some bridge rubble to sell you tomorrow
[BOOM!][BOOM!][BOOM!]

== Arrest and Conviction ==
These actions led to Elonis's arrest on December 8, 2010. He was indicted by a grand jury on five counts of threats to his estranged ex-wife, park employees and visitors, local law enforcement, an FBI agent, and a kindergarten class that had been relayed through interstate communication.

At the district court, Elonis moved to dismiss the indictment for failing to allege that he had intended to threaten anyone, claiming his Facebook post was not intended as a threat. He argued that, as an aspiring rap artist, his posts were intended to be a form of artistic expression to help him cope with his recent loses. According to him, he did not mean anything said in his posts in a literal sense. His motion was denied. He requested a jury instruction that "the government must prove that he intended to communicate a true threat", which was also denied.

He was convicted on the last four of the five counts, and was sentenced to 44 months in prison and three years on supervised release. He appealed unsuccessfully to the Third Circuit, renewing his challenge to the jury instructions. He then appealed to the U.S. Supreme Court based on lack of any attempt to show intent to threaten and on First Amendment rights.

== Decision ==
On June 1, 2015, the U.S. Supreme Court reversed Elonis's conviction in an 8–1 decision. Chief Justice John Roberts wrote for a seven-justice majority, Samuel Alito authored an opinion concurring in part and dissenting in part, and Clarence Thomas authored a dissenting opinion. The finding of the circuit court was reversed and the matter remanded.

=== Majority opinion ===
The majority opinion, written by Roberts, did not rule on First Amendment matters or on the question of whether recklessness was sufficient mens rea to show intent. It ruled that mens rea was required to prove the commission of a crime under §875(c). Importantly, the mens rea issue had been preserved for review, since Elonis had raised that objection at every stage of the previous proceedings.

The government contended that the presence of the words "intent to extort" in §875(b) and §875(d) implied that the absence in §875(c) was constructive. The court disagreed, holding that the absence of the language in §875(c) was because the section was intended to have a broader scope than threats relating to extortion.

The opinion drew on many Supreme Court cases holding that in criminal law, mens rea was required though it had not been mentioned explicitly in statute. Consequently, the Supreme Court ruled in favor of Elonis.

=== Alito's concurrence ===
Justice Samuel Alito, concurring in part and dissenting in part, opined that while agreeing that mens rea was required and specifically that showing negligence was not sufficient, the court should have ruled on the question of recklessness. He further opined that recklessness was sufficient to show a crime under that provision on the basis that going further would amount to amending the statute, rather than interpreting it. Since Elonis explicitly argued that recklessness was not sufficient, Alito said:

I would therefore remand for the Third Circuit to determine if Elonis’s failure (indeed, refusal) to argue for recklessness prevents reversal of his conviction.

The Third Circuit should also have the opportunity to consider whether the conviction could be upheld on harmless error grounds.

Alito also addressed the First Amendment question, elided by the majority opinion. He held that "lyrics in songs that are performed for an audience or sold in recorded form are unlikely to be interpreted as a real threat to a real person. ... Statements on social media that are pointedly directed at their victims, by contrast, are much more likely to be taken seriously."

=== Thomas's dissent ===
Justice Clarence Thomas, dissenting, wrote against discarding the "general intent" standard without replacing it with a clearer standard. Thomas argued that "there is no historical practice requiring more than general intent when a statute regulates speech."

Thomas cited Rosen v. United States, arguing that general intent was sufficient in this case. However, the majority opinion offers refutation in that Rosen turned on ignorance of the law: knowledge as to whether material was legally obscene, not on whether it was intended to be obscene. Thomas also supported the government's claim that the presence of "intent to extort" language in the adjacent §875(b) and did not address the majority's reasoning on that language.

Thomas used precedent, notably from the states and 18th-century England based on other but similar and, arguably, influencing legislation to support his "general intent" claim. Thomas also drew a parallel with general intent in tort. While he sought to address the First Amendment issues, he never strayed far from "general intent".

== Aftermath ==
On remand, the Third Circuit reaffirmed the conviction "concluding beyond a reasonable doubt that Elonis would have been convicted if the jury had been properly instructed" and therefore was harmless error.

In 2022, Elonis was once again arrested and indicted on three counts of cyberstalking involving three people. It was discovered that between 2018 and 2021, Elonis had sent numerous threatening messages over email, text, voice mail, and social media platforms like Twitter to a former prosecutor of the Eastern District of Pennsylvania, his ex-girlfriend, and ex-wife. On August 5, after a five-day trial, Elonis was found guilty on all three counts, and on March 23, 2023, he was sentenced by U.S. District Court Judge Edward G. Smith of Easton, Pennsylvania to twelve years and seven months in prison.

== See also ==
- Rule of lenity
- Counterman v. Colorado
