= Hitlab Music Company =

Artist/band sharing site

Hitlab is a musical website where bands and musicians can promote and advertise themselves. Each artist or band has its own page that may include news, photos, videos, upcoming shows, background / biographical information, contact information, and music for free listening and downloads. Hitlab's artists can share music with each others. Over 30,000 artists house such profiles on Hitlab.

Hitlab, considered an online social network service portal for artists and listeners alike, was founded in October 2007, the website is a promotional grounds for minor or up-and-coming artists, but also boasts signed mainstream]bands as well.

Hitlab created the DHS (dynamic hit scoring) which uses artificial intelligence to predict the hit potential of a new song. The DHS originated from Diagnos, a company who develops and markets knowledge extraction solutions.

By comparing this new song to a massive database of chart-topping singles called the Music DataBase. Where every genre is represented: pop, country, hip hop, rock etc.

The database is updated constantly with new releases. Where a song lives in the universe (i.e. where it is positioned in the database's grid) is determined by patterns in its melody, harmony, chord progression, rhythm, beat, pitch and so on. Songs with similar patterns are close to each other and form groups; songs that are vastly different end up far apart.

Recent hit songs only account for a small number of these groups. To have more chances of being a hit in today's music environment, a new song should fall into one of these groups, i.e. have the same sort of patterns as other recent hits.

Pamela, a 16-year-old singer from Montreal, Canada, initially rose to fame after performing in front of Akon at Hitlab's "September 2008 Showcase". She was one of eight music industry hopefuls chosen by Hitlab for the event and her performance caught the eye of Akon, who promptly took her under his wing. She worked with Akon's production team in the recording studio and is releasing a duet with him in French. It marks the first time Akon, a native of Senegal, has sung in French.
