= Raoul Duke =

Fictional character created by Hunter S. Thompson

- Johnny Depp as Raoul Duke in Fear and Loathing in Las Vegas
- First appearance: Fear and Loathing in Las Vegas (1971 novel)
- Last appearance: Rango (2011 film) (cameo)
- Created by: Hunter S. Thompson
- Portrayed by: Johnny Depp; Hunter S. Thompson (Matrix flashback); Bill Murray

In-universe information
- Gender: Male
- Occupation: Gonzo journalism

Raoul Duke is the partially fictionalized author surrogate character and sometimes pseudonym used by Hunter S. Thompson as the main character and antihero for many of his works. He is best known as the narrator for his 1971 autobiographical novel Fear and Loathing in Las Vegas. The book was originally written under the name Raoul Duke. The character wears a bucket hat and yellow tinted aviator sunglasses.

== In Thompson's writings ==
Duke is the main character and narrator of many of Thompson's stories, novels, and articles, often taking part in the events of Thompson's life in Thompson's place. He is portrayed as a cynical, mentally unbalanced, Gonzo journalist whose daily life is a near-perpetual state of intoxication on whatever drugs happen to be available—ranging from cannabis to amyl nitrite to adrenochrome—in an attempt to keep the spirit of the 1960s, a time which he speaks of romantically in Fear and Loathing in Las Vegas, alive within himself even as the rest of the country forgets it and what it represented. He usually obtains and consumes these substances in the company of his attorney, Dr. Gonzo, a "half-crazed 300 pound Samoan", whose drug-induced frenzies give even Duke pause. Thompson based Gonzo on his friend Oscar Zeta Acosta.

Duke is first mentioned by Thompson in his 1966 book Hell's Angels, where he is described as an outlaw who does not break the law in an offensive way to society, but a way that in fact makes him more acceptable.

Duke is often characterized as being somewhat of an author surrogate. His name, according to Thompson in interviews, was inspired by Raúl Castro and John Wayne's nickname "The Duke"; however, David S. Wills, in High White Notes: The Rise and Fall of Gonzo Journalism, argues that he borrowed the name from a newspaper article during his research for Hell's Angels.

Duke was also used so that Thompson could talk about himself – after a diving accident, Thompson had to spend some time in a decompression chamber, and wrote a letter signed "Raoul Duke" in which the pseudonym described the insanity of Thompson's condition in the chamber – holding up scrawled notes to the single glass window and ordering a television set to watch coverage of the Watergate hearings. The letter appeared in Rolling Stone in August 1973.

In The Great Shark Hunt (a large selection of articles written by Thompson), Raoul Duke's name appears on several essays that were published in newspapers and magazines, including the "Police Chief", an article published by Scanlan's Monthly (June 1970) in which Duke is apparently an ex-police chief raging at the inadequate amount of real "weaponry" used by the police and advertised in the (presumably invented) Police Chief magazine. It was signed "Raoul Duke (Master of Weaponry)".

In Fear and Loathing on the Campaign Trail '72, Thompson describes Raoul Duke as a sports writer friend, one of the few journalists who can truly write objectively instead of merely talking about the concept of objectivity. In the same section, Thompson calls journalistic objectivity "a pompous contradiction in terms", and warns the reader not to look for it under his byline.

Thompson is quoted in the 1978 documentary film Fear and Loathing in Gonzovision, "I'm never sure which one people want me to be [Thompson or Duke], and sometimes they conflict... I am living a normal life, but beside me is this myth, growing larger and getting more and more warped. When I get invited to universities to speak, I'm not sure who they're inviting, Duke or Thompson... I suppose that my plans are to figure out some new identity, kill off one life and start another."

== Portrayals in other media ==
The Duke character has been portrayed in three films:

- The 1980 film Where the Buffalo Roam, in which he is portrayed by Bill Murray.
- The 1998 film adaptation of Fear and Loathing in Las Vegas, in which he is portrayed by Johnny Depp. Author and character creator Hunter S. Thompson portrays an older Duke in a cameo in the Matrix flashback scene where Duke sees himself.
- The 2011 film Rango, in which Duke makes a cameo, voiced again by Johnny Depp, who also voiced the titular character of this film.

== Homages ==
Garry Trudeau's Doonesbury character Uncle Duke is based on Thompson's Raoul Duke. Although the Doonesbury character is usually referred to only as "Duke", various other names for him have appeared over the years, including having the first name "Raoul".
