= The Temptations of Jean-Claude Killy =

1970 article by Hunter S. Thompson

"The Temptations of Jean-Claude Killy" is an article published in the premiere issue of Scanlan's Monthly in March 1970, written by Hunter S. Thompson.

The subject of the article is Jean-Claude Killy, the alpine skiing champion who, in the 1968 Winter Olympics, became the second alpine skier ever to win three gold medals in a single olympic games. By the time of the article Killy, then 26, was retired from skiing and had embarked on the next phase of his career—endorsements.

Thompson's article follows Killy around the United States during his marketing tour for the Chevrolet automotive company. As he attends automotive shows, holds press conferences, and makes appearances for television (all in conjunction with fellow Chevrolet spokesman, O. J. Simpson) Thompson chronicles the newly flush world of celebrity sports endorsements. Though endorsement by a sports figure was not an entirely new concept, the world-wide magnitude of Killy's stardom made his Chevrolet contract something of a fascination for Thompson.

The article's focus on the relative depths of the new pitch-man status obtained by Killy so shortly after the incredible heights he had achieved develops through acerbic descriptions of the settings Killy finds himself in, the automotive executives that profit by him, and the fans and onlookers who make him such a valuable spokesman. Through it all, Killy's focus on his own enormous profit is a source of worry to Thompson. The trend he sees developing is one of larger-than-life stars—athletes of the highest physical standards who have achieved feats unimaginable by normal people—demeaning themselves and their accomplishments by agreeing to shill for a few extra dollars. An enormous sports fan himself, Thompson is distraught by this turn of events and wonders that Killy was never quite sure "why I was embarrassed for him in those scenes."

Thompson compares Killy to F. Scott Fitzgerald's Gatsby: although, unlike that character, Killy's dollars are earned honestly, the author concludes while watching Killy's selling of himself that "nothing in his narrow, high-powered experience can allow him to understand how I can watch his act and say that it looks, to me, like a very hard dollar—maybe the hardest."

The article was later included in Thompson's collection The Great Shark Hunt (1979).
