= Gonzo Today =

Internet-based publication

- Website type: News, literature, music and opinion
- Available in: English
- Founded: 2015
- Website: gonzotoday.com
- Commercial: No
- Current status: Active

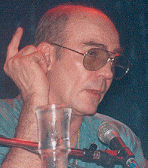
Gonzo journalism originator Hunter S. Thompson in 1989

Gonzo Today is an internet-based publication inspired by the writing and reporting style of gonzo journalism popularized by Hunter Thompson.

== Interviews ==
Among other pursuits, Gonzo Today interviews a wide range of subjects, as reported by The New York Times obituary of poet and artist Heathcote Williams and includes other interview subjects such as artist Clayton Patterson, Ambrosia band members Mary Harris and Burleigh Drummond and former CIA agent and whistleblower, John Kiriakou. Other interview subjects include Michale Graves, Ryan Leone and Doyle Wolfgang von Frankenstein.

Gonzo Today features a banner created by Fear and Loathing in Las Vegas illustrator Ralph Steadman, who has also been interviewed by Gonzo Today. Several Gonzo Today articles have been reprinted and archived by the International Times.

== Staff ==
As of 2025 Gonzo Today lists noted poet and author Ron Whitehead as its honorary poetry editor. Whitehead, a Hunter Thompson friend and associate, has worked for many years to honor Thompson's legacy, including an annual spring "Gonzofest" held in Louisville, Kentucky. Gonzo Today has been acknowledged as a noted contributor to Gonzofest.

Founded by Clayton Luce, his wife and co-founder Jaslyn, then-Editor-in-chief David Pratt and Art Director Joey Feldman played major roles in the formative years, along with a substantial group of writing contributors and artists. Luce and Whitehead's travels to interview Thompson's son and author Juan Thompson have been documented in the Louisville paper LEO Weekly.

Other current staff include Editor-in-chief Kidman J. Williams, Publisher and Contributing Editor Kyle K. Mann, Contributing Editor Karene Horst and Website Manager Maggie Rotts.

== See also ==
- Gonzo journalism
- Censorship
