= The Gonzo Papers =

Series of books by Hunter S. Thompson

The Gonzo Papers is a four volume series of books by American journalist and author Hunter S. Thompson published between 1979 and 1994. The word Gonzo is often used to describe the unique style of journalism that Thompson cultivated throughout his life.

The books largely serve as a collection of hard-to-find newspaper and magazine articles written by Thompson throughout his career, although all volumes do contain some new material by the author. Articles from Thompson's early days as a newspaper free-lancer, correspondent for the National Observer, and columnist for the San Francisco Examiner are included, as are excerpts from Thompson's better known works such as Fear and Loathing in Las Vegas.

The fourth volume, Better Than Sex, is mostly composed of faxes and letters Thompson sent and received regarding the 1992 U.S. Presidential Election, along with a few articles Thompson wrote on the subject.

== Volumes of The Gonzo Papers ==
- Gonzo Papers, Vol. 1: The Great Shark Hunt: Strange Tales from a Strange Time. (New York, Summit Books, 1979; Simon & Schuster, 2003, ISBN 0-7432-5045-1)
- Gonzo Papers, Vol. 2: Generation of Swine: Tales of Shame and Degradation in the '80s. (New York, Summit Books, 1988; Vintage, 1989, ISBN 0-679-72237-8; Simon & Schuster, 2003, ISBN 0-7432-5044-3)
- Gonzo Papers, Vol. 3: Songs of the Doomed: More Notes on the Death of the American Dream. (New York, Summit Books, 1990; Pocket, 1991, ISBN 0-671-74326-0; Simon & Schuster/Touchstone, 2002, ISBN 0-7432-4099-5)
- Gonzo Papers, Vol. 4: Better Than Sex: Confessions of a Political Junkie. (New York, Random House, 1994; Ballantine Books, 1995, ISBN 0-345-39635-9)
