= The Great Shark Hunt =

1979 essay collection by Hunter S. Thompson

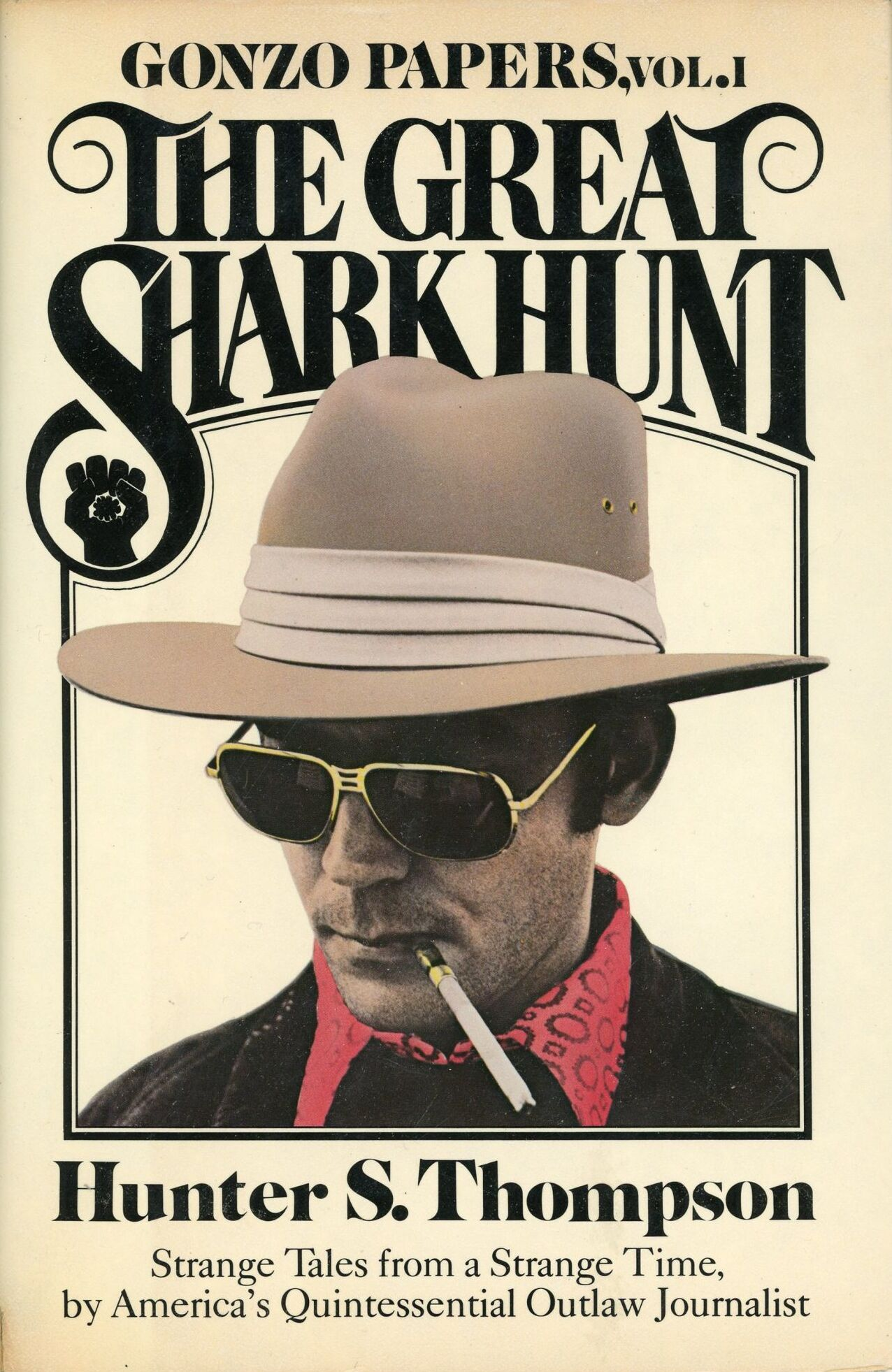
- First edition
- Author: Hunter S. Thompson
- Language: English
- Series: The Gonzo Papers
- Subject: Counterculture of the 1960s, politics, sports
- Genre: Essays, journalism
- Publisher: Summit Books
- Publication date: 1979
- Publication place: United States
- Media type: Print (hardcover and paperback)
- Pages: 624
- ISBN: 0671400460
- Followed by: Generation of Swine

The Great Shark Hunt is a book by Hunter S. Thompson, originally published in 1979. It is also known as Gonzo Papers, Vol. 1: The Great Shark Hunt: Strange Tales from a Strange Time. The book is a roughly 600-page collection of Thompson's essays from 1956 to the end of the 1970s, including the rise of the author's own gonzo journalism style as he moved from Air Force and sports beat writing to straight-ahead political commentary. It is the first of what would become four volumes in The Gonzo Papers series.

== Contents ==
The book has four sections, not strictly chronological, beginning with a collection of his more famous Gonzo-style articles, including those about the Kentucky Derby, Olympic skier Jean-Claude Killy, his Chicano lawyer friend Oscar Zeta Acosta ("Strange Rumblings in Aztlan"), and the 1973 Super Bowl. Next is a section on politics, including excerpts from his book Fear and Loathing on the Campaign Trail '72 and a group of articles from 1973 and 1974 documenting the last months of Richard Nixon's presidency. The third section has a selection of Thompson's earliest writing, including for National Observer and the U.S. Air Force. The last section comprises later cultural commentary and other items. Sections from the author's two original Fear and Loathing serials (...in Las Vegas and on the Campaign Trail '72) are excerpted. Thompson worked for several different publications throughout his career, and The Great Shark Hunt includes articles from the National Observer, Rolling Stone, Scanlan's Monthly, The New York Times, Playboy, and others.

Personalities depicted by the author as cavorting about with him include his illustrator and friend Ralph Steadman, Chicano lawyer Oscar Zeta Acosta, Jean-Claude Killy, and then-football player O. J. Simpson. Political figures appearing prominently in the collection include former U.S. presidents Richard Nixon and Jimmy Carter, and Democratic presidential candidate George McGovern.

The book omits the illustrations by Ralph Steadman that originally accompanied many of the Thompson articles in this collection.

== Contents ==
From the 1992 Simon & Schuster paperback edition, with bibliographies by Kihm Winship

=== Part One ===
- Author's Note
- "Fear and Loathing in the Bunker"
- "The Kentucky Derby Is Decadent and Depraved"
- A Southern City with Northern Problems"
- "Fear and Loathing at the Super Bowl"
- "The Temptations of Jean-Claude Killy"
- "The Ultimate Free Lancer"
- "Collect Telegram from a Mad Dog"
- "'Genius 'Round the World Stands Hand in Hand, and One Shock of Recognition Runs the Whole Circle 'Round'—Art Linkletter" (Note: The quote is actually from "Hawthorne and His Mosses" by Herman Melville.)
- Jacket Copy for Fear & Loathing in Las Vegas: A Savage Journey to the Heart of the American Dream
- "A Conversation on Ralph Steadman and His Book, America, with Dr. Hunter S. Thompson"
- "Strange Rumblings in Aztlan"
- "Freak Power in the Rockies"
- "Memo from the Sports Desk: The So-Called 'Jesus Freak' Scare"
- "Memoirs of a Wretched Weekend in Washington"

=== Part Two ===
- "Presenting: The Richard Nixon Doll (Overhauled 1968 Model)"
- Author's Note
- "June, 1972: The McGovern Juggernaut Rolls On"
- "Later in June"
- "September"
- "October"
- "Epitaph"
- "Memo from the Sports Desk & Rude Notes from a Decompression Chamber in Miami"
- "Fear and Loathing at the Watergate: Mr. Nixon Has Cashed His Check"
- "Fear and Loathing in Washington: The Boys in the Bag"
- "Fear and Loathing in Limbo: The Scum Also Rises"

=== Part Three ===
- "Traveler Hears Mountain Music Where It's Sung"
- "A Footloose American in a Smugglers' Den"
- "Why Anti-Gringo Winds Often Blow South of the Border"
- "Democracy Dies in Peru, but Few Seem to Mourn Its Passing"
- "The Inca of the Andes: He Haunts the Ruins of His Once-Great Empire"
- "Brazilshooting"
- "Chatty Letters During a Journey from Aruba to Rio"
- "What Lured Hemingway to Ketchum"
- "Living in the Time of Alger, Greeley, Debs"
- "Marlon Brando and the Indian Fish-In"
- "The "Hashbury" Is the Capital of the Hippies"
- "When the Beatniks Were Social Lions"
- "The Nonstudent Left"
- "Those Daring Young Men in Their Flying Machines ... Ain't What They Used to Be!"
- "The Police Chief"

=== Part Four ===
- "The Great Shark Hunt"
- "Jimmy Carter and the Great Leap of Faith"
- "Address by Jimmy Carter on Law Day: University of Georgia, Athens, GA"
- "The Banshee Screams for Buffalo Meat"
- "The Hoodlum Circus and the Statutory Rape of Bass Lake"
- "Ashes to Ashes & Dust to Dust: The Funeral of Mother Miles"
- "Welcome to Las Vegas: When the Going Gets Weird the Weird Turn Pro"
- "Last Tango in Vegas: Fear and Loathing in the Near Room"
- "Last Tango in Vegas: Fear and Loathing in the Far Room"
- Bibliography of Work by Dr. Hunter S. Thompson, by Kihm Winship
- Bibliography of Work on Dr. Hunter S. Thompson, by Kihm Winship
