= Songs of the Doomed =

1990 book by Hunter S. Thompson

- First edition
- Author: Hunter S. Thompson
- Language: English
- Series: The Gonzo Papers
- Subject: Politics, Journalism
- Publisher: Simon & Schuster
- Publication date: October 1990
- Publication place: United States
- Pages: 320
- ISBN: 0-330-32179-X
- OCLC: 24246483
- Dewey Decimal: 973.92 20
- LC Class: E839.5 .T47 1991
- Preceded by: Generation of Swine
- Followed by: Better Than Sex

Gonzo Papers, Vol. 3: Songs of the Doomed: More Notes on the Death of the American Dream is a book by the American writer and journalist Hunter S. Thompson, originally published in 1990. The third installment of the four-volume The Gonzo Papers, it is a chronologically arranged selection of essays, newspaper articles, stories and letters, allowing readers to see how Thompson's brand of New Journalism, also termed Gonzo journalism, evolved over the years. Songs of the Doomed is mostly made up of pieces written between 1980 and 1990, but there is also some older material, including excerpts from Fear and Loathing in Las Vegas; Fear and Loathing on the Campaign Trail '72; his unfinished first novel, Prince Jellyfish, which is still unpublished; and The Rum Diary, which was not published in its entirety until 1998.

== Contents ==
Songs of the Doomed is a collection of essays, short stories, and newspaper articles written by Thompson during his career. The book is separated into five sections: "The Fifties: Last Rumble in Fat City", "The Sixties: What the Hell? It's Only Rock and Roll...", "The Seventies: Reaping the Whirlwind, Riding the Tiger", "The Eighties: How Much Money Do You Have?", and "Welcome to the Nineties: Welcome to Jail".

Author's Note
Let the Trials Begin / Electricity / Last Train from Camelot / Note from Ralph Steadman

The Fifties: Last Rumble in Fat City
Tarred and Feathered at the Jersey Shore / Saturday Night at the Riviera / Prince Jellyfish / Fleeing New York

The Sixties: What the Hell? It's Only Rock and Roll...
Letter to Angus Cameron / The Rum Diary / Revisited: The Puerto Rican Problem / The Kennedy Assassination / Back to the U.S.A. / Hell's Angels: Long Nights, Ugly Days, Orgy of the Doomed / Midnight on the Coast Highway / Ken Kesey: Walking with the Kind / LSD-25: Res Ipsa Loquitor / Chicago 1968: Death to the Weird / First Visit with Mescalito

The Seventies: Reaping the Whirlwind, Riding the Tiger
Iguana Project / Never Apologize, Never Explain / Vegas Witchcraft / High-Water Mark / Fear and Loathing / Lies / Ed Muskie Doomed by Ibogaine / Washington Politics / Summit Conference in Elko: Secret Gathering of the Power Elite / Opening Statement: HST / Rolling Stone: Abandon All Hope Ye Who Enter Here / Dance of the Doomed / Checking into the Lane Xang / Whooping it up with the War Junkies / Confidential Memo to Colonel Vo Don Giang / Memo to Jim Silberman on the Death of the American Dream / Letter to Russell Chatham

The Eighties: How Much Money Do You Have?
Welcome to the 80's / Love on the Palm Beach Express / Sugarloaf Key / The Silk Road / Letter to Ralph Steadman / Letter to Ken Kesey / Last Memo from the National Affairs Desk / Memo from the Sports Desk / Wild Sex in Sausalito / The Dukakis Problem: Another vicious beating for the New Whigs / Secret Cables to Willie Hearst / San Francisco Examiner Columns / The New Dumb / Fear and Loathing in Sacramento / Whiskey Business / I knew the Bride When She Used to Rock and Roll / Community of Whores / Return to the Riviera Cafe / Avery: Making Sense of the 60's / German Decade: Rise of the Fourth Reich / Turbo Must Die / Memo to Jay Johnson / Warning Issued on Cocaine

Welcome to the Nineties: Welcome to Jail

== Reception ==
Writing for The New York Times, Ron Rosenbaum said, "Reading Songs of the Doomed reminds us how good he was at his best, and how good he still can be when he's given the freedom — and expenses — to hit the road, rather than stewing in his own bitterness in Woody Creek." Kirkus Reviews gave Songs of the Doomed a mixed review, calling it "an erratically incandescent collection, full of curiosities but not nearly as marvelous as Thompson seems to think."
