= Kingdom of Fear (book) =

2003 non-fiction book by Hunter S. Thompson

- First edition cover
- Author: Hunter S. Thompson
- Publisher: Simon & Schuster
- Publication date: January 21, 2003
- Pages: 356
- ISBN: 0-684-87323-0

Kingdom of Fear: Loathsome Secrets of a Star-Crossed Child In the Final Days of the American Century is a 2003 non-fiction book by American journalist and author Hunter S. Thompson. The book is a collection of writings about Thompson's past that focuses on the theme of rebellion against authority. Many of the stories are placed in the context of the aftermath of the September 11 attacks and its emphasis on heightened police and military operations.

== Plot summary ==
The book seems to begin as memoir or an autobiography, but rapidly devolves into numerous fragmented accounts of Thompson's exploits which could be termed as a type of Gonzo biography. There is a rough adherence to actual chronology though many events in the book are not in order. However, some continuity does exist throughout the work, for example, the "Witness" segments, dealing with Gail Palmer's sexual assault lawsuit against Thompson, appearing once every section in roughly the same area. In addition to these larger narratives, there are also several sections which hold no connection to each other in any way, with the exception of some of the same people or places from a previous section being mentioned.

Among the events, the ones which seem to be as closely related to Thompson's life include:

- An early incident involving the FBI attempting to arrest a then nine-year-old Thompson for an action which apparently resulted in the destruction of a federal mailbox.
- The "Witness" sections
- Various exploits of Thompson's either at or involving the Mitchell Brothers O'Farrell Theatre in San Francisco, a notorious pornographic theater where he claims to have worked throughout the mid eighties.
- A possibly fictionalized account of how Thompson met his assistant and later wife Anita.

== Major themes ==
Writing and punctuation themes are more pronounced in Kingdom of Fear than in many of Thompson's previous works. In particular, he habitually uses the following alterations:

- The addition of a number in numerals in brackets after printing the number as word, such as, "but when you are a nine-year-old boy with two (2) full-grown FBI agents..."
- The use of the ampersand instead of the word 'and' when he is using 'and' as a word to connect two adjectives, such as, deranged & insane
- The use of the abbreviation 'yr.' instead of the word 'your'.
- The capitalization of nouns deemed important to the author: "...an eerie sense of Panic in the air, a silent Fear and Uncertainty that comes with once-reliable faiths and truths and solid Institutions that are no longer safe to believe in..."
- The typeface changes throughout the book.

Thompson also used this style in the contemporary Hey Rube: Blood Sport, the Bush Doctrine, and the Downward Spiral of Dumbness.
