= Strange Rumblings in Aztlan =

1971 magazine article by Hunter S. Thompson

"Strange Rumblings in Aztlan" is an article published in Rolling Stone #81, dated April 29, 1971, and written by Hunter S. Thompson. It was included in the first volume of Thompson's Gonzo Papers, The Great Shark Hunt, published in 1979.

The article takes its title from the city of Aztlán, the ancestral home of the Aztec people, which generally refers to the "conquered territories" of Mexico that came under United States control after the Mexican–American War. The territory covered parts of modern-day Texas, Arizona, New Mexico, and California.

== Background ==
The subject of the article is primarily the events and atmosphere surrounding the reaction of the Chicano community in Los Angeles to the killing of Rubén Salazar on August 29, 1970, the day of the historic National Chicano Moratorium March and rally against the Vietnam War. Salazar was covering the day's events as a columnist for the Los Angeles Times and news director of Los Angeles Spanish-language station KMEX-TV. After the conclusion of the march, while sipping a beer at the counter of the Silver Dollar Cafe, Salazar was hit in the head by a tear gas shell fired by Los Angeles County sheriff's deputy Tom Wilson. The day's almost entirely nonviolent nature had turned suddenly violent due to the decision of police to clear Laguna Park (now renamed Ruben F. Salazar Park) of the 20,000 to 30,000 people attending a post-march rally.

Though marginally involved in the nascent Chicano civil rights movement of the time, Salazar became a martyr to the community when the details surrounding his death became public. Thompson's report on the situation focuses largely on this history of the violence and repression that haunted the barrio neighborhoods of Los Angeles during this period. The article lays out a timeline of events preceding and following Salazar's death. Of primary concern is the reaction of the sheriff's department and what many saw as a cover-up for a deliberate murder. Over the course of the reporting it becomes increasingly clear that the official stories offered to explain the shooting contradict eyewitness, and eventually, previous "official" versions of the event.

The article is also of note for the appearance of Oscar Zeta Acosta, an acquaintance and "sometimes antagonist" of Thompson's at the time. It was during his reporting for the Salazar story that Thompson and Acosta took a road trip to Las Vegas in order to escape the pressure of Los Angeles and to find a place where Acosta could discuss the case openly, without fear of retaliation from either the police or Chicanos who might see him as cooperating with the Establishment. The road trip to Vegas became the basis for Thompson's book Fear and Loathing in Las Vegas, with Acosta serving as the inspiration for the novel's Dr. Gonzo.

== See also ==
- Chicano Liberation Front § Legacy
