= Polo Is My Life =

Novel by Hunter S. Thompson

Polo Is My Life is an unpublished novel written by Hunter S. Thompson. It was briefly excerpted in Rolling Stone in 1994, and which Thompson himself described in 1996 as "...a sex book — you know, sex, drugs and rock and roll. It's about the manager of a sex theater who's forced to leave and flee to the mountains. He falls in love and gets in even more trouble than he was in the sex theater in San Francisco". The novel was slated to be released by Random House in 1999, and was even assigned ISBN 0-679-40694-8, but was not published. A self-contained short story by that title was published in Rolling Stone, no. 697, 15 December 1994, 44ff. An analysis of the story was published in Hunter S. Thompson: Fear, Loathing, and the Birth of Gonzo, Rowman & Littlefield, 2016 by Kevin T. McEneaney, 225-231.

Thompson recalled the origin of the title during the conclusion of an October 30, 1998 interview on Charlie Rose: "I remember this woman... the title comes from... I was talking to this woman that I developed a correspondence for – a polo person – and, she had a violent husband, the cops were all over me... chasing me; I said, 'Let's go to Australia, go on a plane... across Australia', and she said, 'You don't understand. Polo is my life. I can't run away with you. Who would take care of my ponies?' That's where Polo Is My Life comes from".
