= Generation of Swine =

1988 book by Hunter S. Thompson

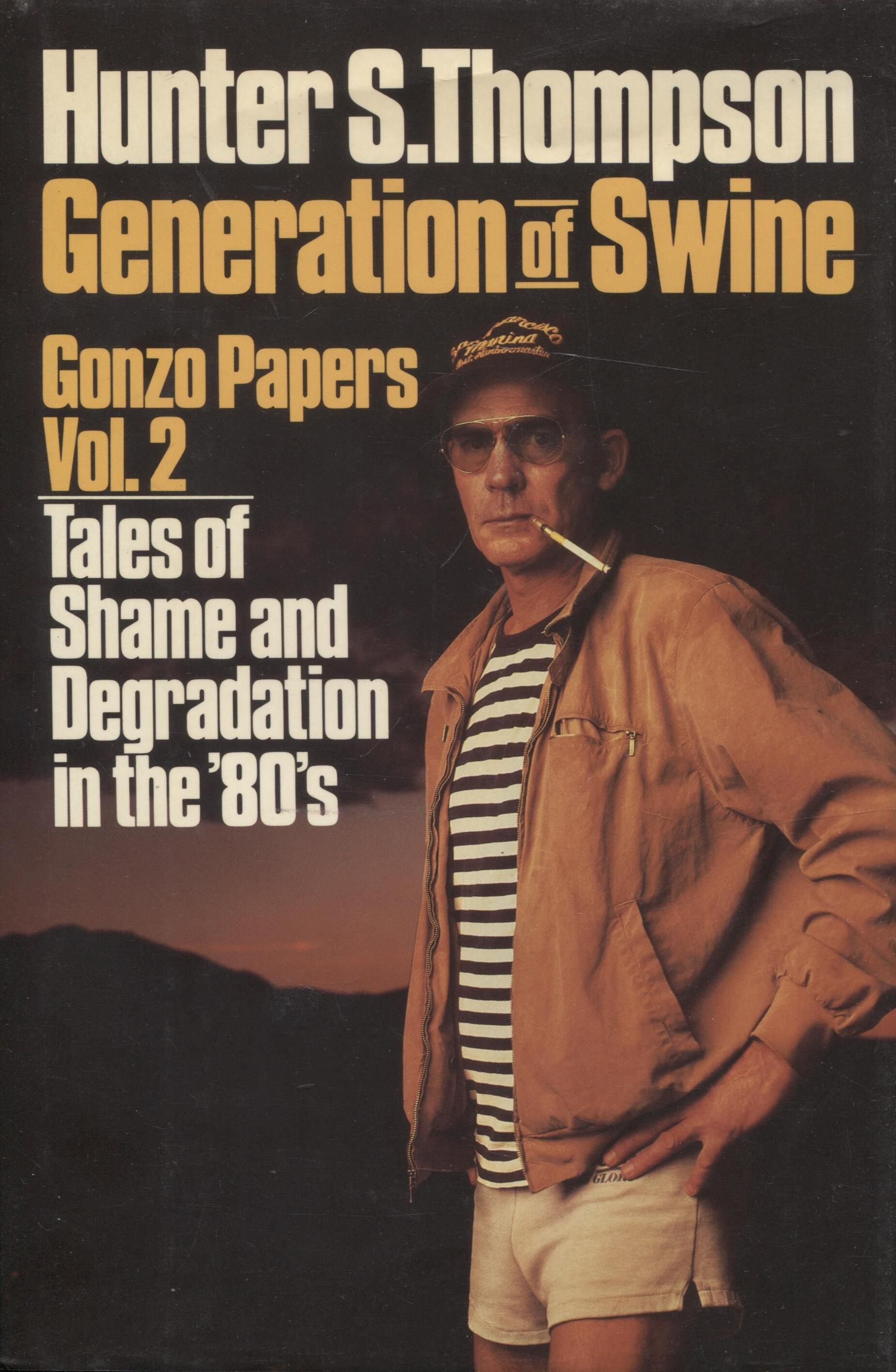
- First edition
- Author: Hunter S. Thompson
- Language: English
- Series: The Gonzo Papers
- Subject: Politics
- Publisher: Summit Books
- Publication date: 1988
- Publication place: United States
- Pages: 304
- ISBN: 978-0-671-66147-2
- Preceded by: The Great Shark Hunt
- Followed by: Songs of the Doomed

Gonzo Papers, Vol. 2: Generation of Swine: Tales of Shame and Degradation in the '80s is a book by the American writer and journalist Hunter S. Thompson, originally published in 1988. The book contains 100 of Thompson's columns that appeared from September 1985 to November 1988 in the San Francisco Examiner, which discuss the politics and culture of the 1980s, with significant coverage of the Iran-Contra Affair, and Gary Hart's run for president.

He predicts that the Democrats will self-destruct in the 1988 presidential campaign. He also makes bets about the Democratic Party candidates odds of winning their elections. People he dislikes are described as "money-sucking animals," "brainless freaks," "geeks," "greed-crazed lunatics" and so on. Thompson also quotes from the Bible's Book of Revelation in many instances.

It is the second volume of the four-volume The Gonzo Papers series. Besides the first six columns (which front-load the collection by setting up the overtly political aspect of the book's main topics), the columns are presented in chronological order.

One oft-quoted, and misquoted, passage from Volume 2 is about the television broadcasting business, specifically television journalism:

The TV business is uglier than most things. It is normally perceived as some kind of cruel and shallow money trench through the heart of the journalism industry, a long plastic hallway where thieves and pimps run free and good men die like dogs, for no good reason.
