= Better Than Sex (book) =

1994 book by Hunter S. Thompson

- First edition
- Author: Hunter S. Thompson
- Language: English
- Series: The Gonzo Papers
- Subject: Politics, Bill Clinton, Journalism
- Publisher: Random House
- Publication date: August 22, 1994
- Publication place: United States
- Pages: 245 pp (Hardcover Version)
- ISBN: 978-0-345-39635-8
- OCLC: 33068635
- Dewey Decimal: 973.929 20
- LC Class: E884 .T47 1995
- Preceded by: Songs of the Doomed

Better Than Sex: Confessions of a Political Junkie is a 1994 book written by American author and journalist Hunter S. Thompson. In Volume IV of The Gonzo Papers series of books, Thompson details his reactions to the 1992 election of Bill Clinton as U.S. President, as well as recollects his own (unsuccessful) run for sheriff of Pitkin County, Colorado.

The book contains a number of magazine articles and other essays Thompson wrote about the Clinton election, but consists largely of faxes Thompson sent to various celebrities, politicians and journalists about the subject. It is the only volume in The Gonzo Papers to be composed of mostly new material.

Some copies are additionally subtitled Trapped Like a Rat in Mr. Bill's Neighborhood.
