= Fear and Loathing in Las Vegas =

1971 novel by Hunter S. Thompson

- First edition
- Author: Hunter S. Thompson
- Illustrator: Ralph Steadman
- Language: English
- Series: Gonzo Series
- Genre: Gonzo journalism
- Publisher: Random House
- Publication date: November 11, 1971 (magazine); July 7, 1972 (book)
- Publication place: United States
- Media type: Print (Hardback & Paperback)
- Pages: 204 pp
- ISBN: 0-679-78589-2
- OCLC: 41049769
- Dewey Decimal: 070/.92 B 21
- LC Class: PN4874.T444 A3 1998b

Fear and Loathing in Las Vegas: A Savage Journey to the Heart of the American Dream is a 1971 novel in the gonzo journalism style by Hunter S. Thompson. The book is a roman à clef, rooted in autobiographical incidents. The story follows its protagonist, Raoul Duke, and his attorney, Doctor Gonzo, as they descend on Las Vegas to chase the American Dream through a drug-induced haze, all the while ruminating on the failure of the 1960s countercultural movement. The work is Thompson's most famous book and is noted for its lurid descriptions of illicit drug use and its early retrospective on the culture of the 1960s. Thompson's highly subjective blend of fact and fiction, which it popularised, became known as gonzo journalism. Illustrated by Ralph Steadman, the novel first appeared as a two-part series in Rolling Stone magazine in 1971 before being published in book form in 1972. It was later adapted into a film of the same title in 1998 by director Terry Gilliam, starring Johnny Depp and Benicio del Toro, who portrayed Raoul Duke and Dr. Gonzo, respectively.

== Plot ==
In 1971, journalist Raoul Duke and his attorney, Dr. Gonzo, are driving from LA to Las Vegas to cover the Mint 400 Motorcycle race. Along the way, they pick up a hitchhiker, and Duke explains the preparation for the trip, including gathering quantities of several different types of drugs and renting the "Great Red Shark". Shortly after explaining, the two scare off the hitchhiker, and then take a large dose of LSD and finish the drive to Vegas.

The two arrive in the lobby of the Mint Hotel, while still under the influence of LSD. Duke has bizarre hallucinations and acts strangely, culminating in him perceiving everyone in the bar to be giant lizards, devouring the women within the area. Gonzo, who is able to keep a level head throughout all of this, signs the two in with press credentials, and brings Duke up to their hotel room. They later leave to get an early look at the Mint Gun Club, where the race will be held. While there, Duke meets Lacerda, a photographer assigned to work with them.

The next day, Duke and Gonzo go to the bar at the gun club and wait for the race to start. Once it starts, Duke is unable to tell what is going on, and goes on a side-by-side ride with Lacerda, to capture photos. Eventually, Duke gives up and leaves.

Later that night, Duke and Gonzo are driving around Vegas intoxicated. After struggling to find parking, they go to the Desert Inn to see a Debbie Reynolds performance. The pair get kicked out of the show for smoking marijuana. They then huff some ether and wander around the Circus Circus, in a drunken stupor. While in the Circus Circus, Gonzo starts to feel the effects of the mescaline pills that he took earlier, and the two leave. Back in the hotel room, Gonzo keeps getting worse. When Duke eventually calms him down, he reminisces about the 1960s, and goes to sleep.

He wakes up the next morning and finds that Gonzo is gone and there is a pile of room service receipts. Unable to pay, he flees, hoping to make a quick drive back to Los Angeles. While driving along in an extremely paranoid state, Duke eventually calls Gonzo, and finds that he was supposed to check into the Flamingo Hotel and cover a national police meeting on drug use.

After Duke finishes checking into the hotel, he is attacked by a teenage girl named Lucy who has traveled from Kalispell, Montana to Las Vegas to gift Barbra Streisand portraits she made of the singer. He then learns that Gonzo gave her LSD to "help her out" only to find that she is a devout Christian and has never even used alcohol. The two give her more LSD, and then drop her off at a different hotel, hoping she will not remember them. However, when they get back to the hotel room, they find that Lucy has left them a message, and is asking Gonzo for help. Gonzo manages to trick her into thinking that Duke drugged both of them, and that Gonzo is now being arrested, advising her to hide. Afterwards, Gonzo advises Duke to take adrenochrome. When Duke takes it he experiences nightmarish hallucinations before eventually falling asleep.

The next day, they attend the drug convention, where they observe a comically out of touch presentation by a police "drug expert". Later, the two drive in Las Vegas, and encounter a family from Oklahoma, to whom Gonzo aggressively tries to sell heroin. Afterwards, they stop at a diner in North Las Vegas, where Gonzo makes a provocative and offensive gesture to the waitress, leading to a confrontation.

Next morning, the two rush to the airport and upon realizing they are about to miss a flight to L.A., Duke drives onto the runway area of the airport, drops Gonzo off and escapes through a break in a fence. After the departure of his lawyer, Duke spends the remaining days in his hotel suite recounting memories from Aspen, and attempting to purchase an ape. Duke returns to Circus Circus to acquire the ape, but discovers it has been taken by animal control after attacking another patron. After a while, Duke himself boards a plane to Denver. The book ends with Duke purchasing amyl nitrite from the airport pharmacy, and consuming them in front of the petrified pharmacist.

== Origins ==
The novel Fear and Loathing in Las Vegas is based on two trips to Las Vegas, Nevada, that Hunter S. Thompson took with attorney and Chicano activist Oscar Zeta Acosta in March and April 1971. The first trip resulted from an exposé Thompson was writing for Rolling Stone magazine about the Mexican American television journalist Rubén Salazar, whom officers of the Los Angeles County Sheriff's Department had shot and killed with a tear gas grenade fired at close range during the National Chicano Moratorium March against the Vietnam War in 1970. Thompson was using Acosta—a prominent Mexican American political activist and attorney—as a central source for the story, and the two found it difficult for a brown-skinned Mexican to talk openly with a white reporter in the racially tense atmosphere of Los Angeles, California. Needing a more comfortable place to discuss the story, they decided to take advantage of an offer from Sports Illustrated to write photograph captions for the annual Mint 400 desert race being held in Las Vegas from March 21 to 23, 1971.

Thompson wrote that he concluded their March trip by spending some 36 hours alone in a hotel room "feverishly writing in my notebook" about his experiences. These writings became the genesis of Fear and Loathing in Las Vegas: A Savage Journey to the Heart of the American Dream.

What originally was a 250-word photo caption assignment for Sports Illustrated grew to a novel-length feature story for Rolling Stone; Thompson said publisher Jann Wenner had "liked the first 20 or so jangled pages enough to take it seriously on its own terms and tentatively scheduled it for publication—which gave me the push I needed to keep working on it." He had first submitted a 2,500-word manuscript to Sports Illustrated that was "aggressively rejected."

Weeks later Thompson and Acosta returned to Las Vegas to report for Rolling Stone on the National District Attorneys Association's Conference on Narcotics and Dangerous Drugs being held from April 25–29, 1971, and to add material to the larger Fear and Loathing narrative. Besides attending the attorneys' conference, Thompson and Acosta looked for ways in Vegas to explore the theme of the American Dream, which was the basis for the novel's second half, to which Thompson referred at the time as "Vegas II".

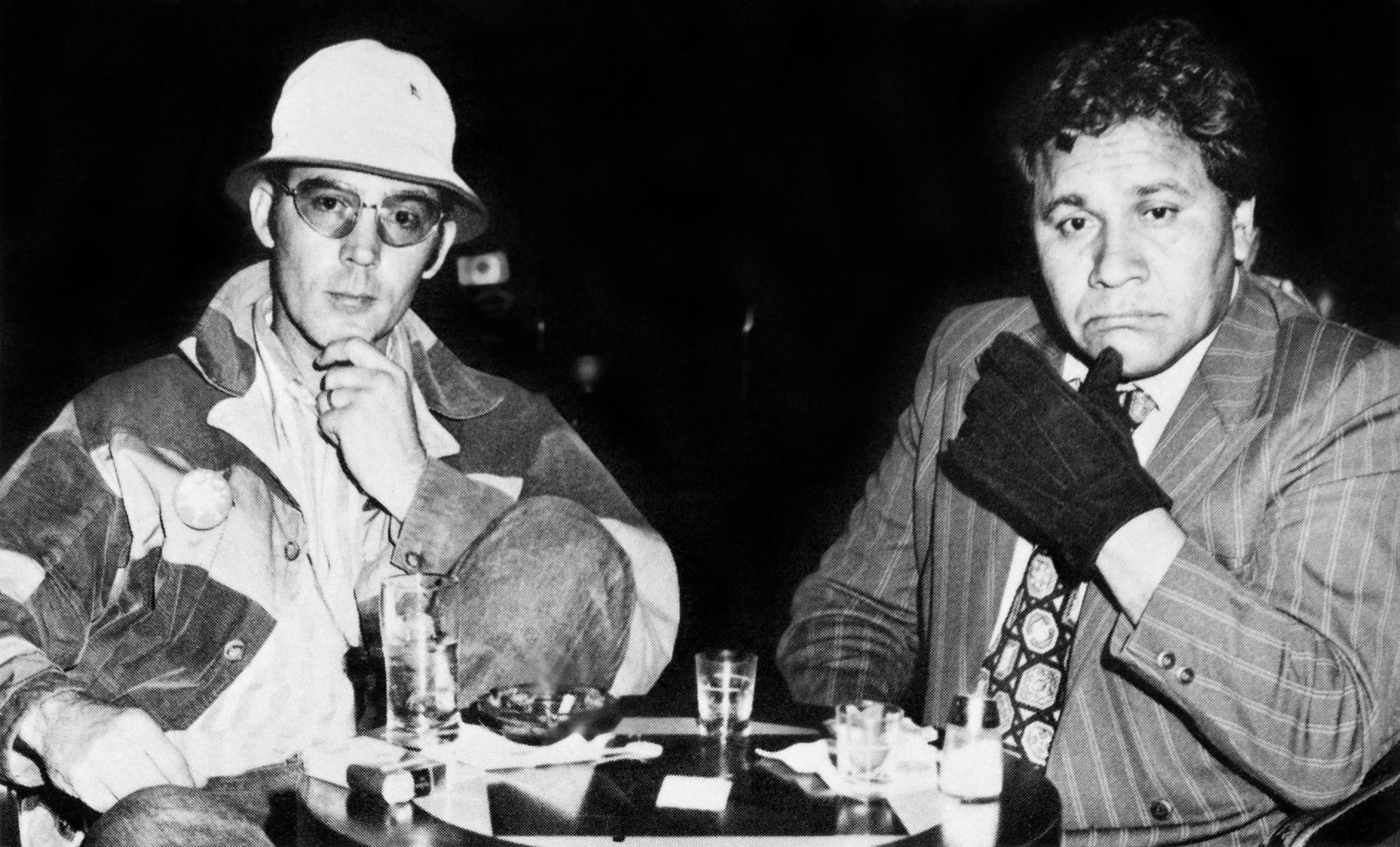
Thompson (left) and Oscar Zeta Acosta in Caesars Palace, c. March–April 1971

On April 29, 1971, Thompson began writing the full manuscript in a hotel room in Arcadia, California, in his spare time while completing "Strange Rumblings in Aztlan," the article chronicling the death of Salazar. Thompson joined the array of Vegas experiences within what he called "an essentially fictional framework" that described a singular free-wheeling trip to Vegas peppered with creative licenses.

In November 1971, Rolling Stone published the combined texts of the trips as Fear and Loathing in Las Vegas: A Savage Journey to the Heart of the American Dream as a two-part story, illustrated by Ralph Steadman, who two years before had worked with Thompson on an article titled "The Kentucky Derby Is Decadent and Depraved". Random House published the hardcover edition in July 1972, with additional illustrations by Steadman; The New York Times said it is "by far the best book yet on the decade of dope," with Tom Wolfe describing it as a "scorching epochal sensation."

== The "wave speech" ==
The "wave speech" is a passage at the end of the eighth chapter that captures the hippie zeitgeist and its end. Thompson often cited this passage during interviews, choosing it when asked to read aloud from the novel:

Strange memories on this nervous night in Las Vegas. Five years later? Six? It seems like a lifetime, or at least a Main Era—the kind of peak that never comes again. San Francisco in the middle sixties was a very special time and place to be a part of. Maybe it meant something. Maybe not, in the long run... but no explanation, no mix of words or music or memories can touch that sense of knowing that you were there and alive in that corner of time and the world. Whatever it meant....

History is hard to know, because of all the hired bullshit, but even without being sure of "history" it seems entirely reasonable to think that every now and then the energy of a whole generation comes to a head in a long fine flash, for reasons that nobody really understands at the time—and which never explain, in retrospect, what actually happened.

My central memory of that time seems to hang on one or five or maybe forty nights—or very early mornings—when I left the Fillmore half-crazy and, instead of going home, aimed the big 650 Lightning across the Bay Bridge at a hundred miles an hour wearing L. L. Bean shorts and a Butte sheepherder's jacket... booming through the Treasure Island tunnel at the lights of Oakland and Berkeley and Richmond, not quite sure which turn-off to take when I got to the other end (always stalling at the toll-gate, too twisted to find neutral while I fumbled for change)... but being absolutely certain that no matter which way I went I would come to a place where people were just as high and wild as I was: No doubt at all about that...

There was madness in any direction, at any hour. If not across the Bay, then up the Golden Gate or down 101 to Los Altos or La Honda.... You could strike sparks anywhere. There was a fantastic universal sense that whatever we were doing was right, that we were winning....

And that, I think, was the handle—that sense of inevitable victory over the forces of Old and Evil. Not in any mean or military sense; we didn't need that. Our energy would simply prevail. There was no point in fighting—on our side or theirs. We had all the momentum; we were riding the crest of a high and beautiful wave....

So now, less than five years later, you can go up on a steep hill in Las Vegas and look West, and with the right kind of eyes you can almost see the high-water mark—that place where the wave finally broke and rolled back.

In High White Notes: The Rise and Fall of Gonzo Journalism, David S. Wills explains how the "wave speech" was influenced by Thompson's use of The Great Gatsby as a literary template. He argues that the entire wave passage replicated the rhythm, not to mention the theme, of the final page and a half of F. Scott Fitzgerald's novel. Thompson himself frequently compared his book to The Great Gatsby.

== Title ==
Fear and Loathing in Las Vegas is Thompson's most famous work and is known as Fear and Loathing for short; however, he later used the phrase "Fear and Loathing" in the titles of other books, essays, and magazine articles.

In a Rolling Stone magazine interview, Thompson said of the phrase: "It came out of my own sense of fear, and [is] a perfect description of that situation to me, however, I have been accused of stealing it from Nietzsche or Kafka or something. It seemed like a natural thing."

He first used the phrase in a letter to a friend written after the Kennedy assassination, describing how he felt about whoever had shot President John F. Kennedy. In "The Kentucky Derby Is Decadent and Depraved", he used the phrase to describe how people regarded Ralph Steadman upon seeing his caricatures of them.

Jann Wenner claims that the title came from Thomas Wolfe's The Web and the Rock.

Another possible influence is Fear and Trembling, a philosophical work by existentialist Søren Kierkegaard published in 1843. The title is a reference to a line from a Bible verse by St. Paul, Philippians 2:12, that man works out his salvation "in fear and trembling."

== Reactions to the novel ==
When it was published in fall of 1971 many critics did not like the novel's loose plot and the scenes of drug use; however, some reviewers predicted that Fear and Loathing in Las Vegas would become an important piece of American literature.

In The New York Times, Christopher Lehmann-Haupt told readers to not "even bother" trying to understand the novel, and that "what goes on in these pages make[s] Lenny Bruce seem angelic"; instead, he acknowledged that the novel's true importance is in Thompson's literary method: "The whole book boils down to a kind of mad, corrosive prose poetry that picks up where Norman Mailer's An American Dream left off and explores what Tom Wolfe left out".

As the novel became popular the reviews became positive; Crawford Woods, also in The New York Times, wrote a positive review countering Lehmann-Haupt's negative review: the novel is "a custom-crafted study of paranoia, a spew from the 1960s and—in all its hysteria, insolence, insult and rot—a desperate and important book, a wired nightmare, the funniest piece of American prose"; and "this book is such a mind storm that we may need a little time to know that it is also literature... it unfolds a parable of the nineteen-sixties to those of us who lived in them in a mood—perhaps more melodramatic than astute—of social strife, surreal politics and the chemical feast." About Thompson, Woods said he "trusts the authority of his senses, and the clarity of a brain poised between brilliance and burnout".

In any event, Fear and Loathing in Las Vegas became a benchmark in American literature about U.S. society in the early 1970s. In Billboard magazine, Chris Morris said, "Through Duke and Gonzo's drug-addled shenanigans amid the seediness of the desert pleasure palaces, it perfectly captured the zeitgeist of the post–'60s era". In Rolling Stone magazine, Mikal Gilmore wrote that the novel "peers into the best and worst mysteries of the American heart" and that Thompson "sought to understand how the American dream had turned a gun on itself". Gilmore believes that "the fear and loathing Thompson was writing about—a dread of both interior demons and the psychic landscape of the nation around him—wasn't merely his own; he was also giving voice to the mind-set of a generation that had held high ideals and was now crashing hard against the walls of American reality". Cormac McCarthy had called the book "a classic of our time" and one of the few great modern novels.

== As a work of gonzo journalism ==
In the book The Great Shark Hunt, Thompson refers to Fear and Loathing in Las Vegas as "a failed experiment in the gonzo journalism" he practiced, which was based on William Faulkner's idea that "the best fiction is far more true than any kind of journalism—and the best journalists have always known this". Thompson's style blended the techniques of fictional story-telling and journalism.

He called it a failed experiment because he originally intended to record every detail of the Las Vegas trip as it happened, and then publish the raw, unedited notes; however, he revised it during the spring and summer of 1971. For example, the novel describes Duke attending the motorcycle race and the narcotics convention in a few days' time; the actual events occurred a month apart. Later, he wrote, "I found myself imposing an essentially fictional framework on what began as a piece of straight/crazy journalism".

Nevertheless, critics call Fear and Loathing Thompson's crowning achievement in gonzo journalism. For example, journalist and author Mikal Gilmore said the novel "feels free wheeling when you read it [but] it doesn't feel accidental. The writing is right there, on the page—startling, unprecedented and brilliantly crafted".

== Changes in the book version ==
The novel was first published serially in Rolling Stone magazine, under the byline "Raoul Duke". The book version was published with Thompson's name as the author.

In chapter 8 of part I, Thompson tells a story about his neighbor, "a former acid guru who later claimed to have made that long jump from chemical frenzy to preternatural consciousness". In the Rolling Stone article, the neighbor was identified as "Dr. Robert De Ropp on Sonoma Mountain Road". In the book version, the name and the street were redacted, as a footnote says, "at insistence of publisher's lawyer".

In chapter 12 of part II, Thompson tells of a belligerent drunk confronting Bruce Innes, of Canadian folk band The Original Caste, at a club in Aspen. The heckler was identified in the Rolling Stone version as "Wally Schirra, the Astronaut". In the book version he is only identified as "a former Astronaut" and his name is, again, redacted "at insistence of publisher's lawyer".

== Illustrations ==
British artist Ralph Steadman added his unique and grotesque illustrations to the Rolling Stone issues and to the novel. Steadman had first met Thompson when Scanlan's Monthly hired Steadman to do the illustrations for Thompson's first venture into gonzo journalism called "The Kentucky Derby Is Decadent and Depraved."

Many critics have hailed Steadman's illustrations as another main character of the novel and companion to Thompson's disjointed narrative. The New York Times noted that "Steadman's drawings were stark and crazed and captured Thompson's sensibility, his notion that below the plastic American surface lurked something chaotic and violent. The drawings are the plastic torn away and the people seen as monsters."

Steadman has expressed regret at selling the illustrations, at the advice of his agent, to Rolling Stone founder Jann Wenner for the sum of $75, which remained in Wenner's possession until he sold them in 2016. As a result of that transaction Steadman has largely refused to sell any of his original artwork and has been quoted as saying "If anyone owns a Steadman original, it's stolen." While there are original pieces held outside his archive, they are exceedingly rare. The artist has kept possession of the vast bulk of his artwork.

== Adaptations ==
=== Audiobook ===
An audiobook version was released by Margaritaville Records and Island Records in 1996, on the 25th anniversary of the book's original publication. It features the voice talents of Harry Dean Stanton as the narrator/an older Hunter S. Thompson, Jim Jarmusch as Raoul Duke, and Maury Chaykin as Dr. Gonzo, with Jimmy Buffett, Joan Cusack, Buck Henry, and Harry Shearer in minor roles. Sound effects, period-appropriate music and album-like sound mixing are used extensively to give it the surreal feeling characteristic of the book. Quotes from Thompson himself bookend the album.

The album is believed to be out-of-print due to its relative rarity, but is sought after by fans for its high production values and faithfulness to the book's tone. Excerpts of it were included in the Criterion Collection release of the movie.

=== Film adaptation ===
The novel's popularity gave rise to attempted cinematic adaptations; directors Martin Scorsese and Oliver Stone each unsuccessfully attempted to film a version of the novel. In the course of these attempts, Jack Nicholson and Marlon Brando were considered for the roles of Duke and Dr. Gonzo but the production stalled, and the actors aged beyond the characters. Afterwards, Dan Aykroyd and John Belushi were considered, but Belushi's death ended that plan. Art Linson's 1980 film Where the Buffalo Roam starring Bill Murray and Peter Boyle is based on a number of Thompson's stories, including Fear and Loathing in Las Vegas.

In 1989, Fear and Loathing in Las Vegas was almost made by director Terry Gilliam when he was given a script by illustrator Ralph Steadman. Gilliam, however, felt that the script "didn't capture the story properly". In 1995, Gilliam received a different script he felt worth realising; his 1998 film features Johnny Depp and Benicio del Toro as Raoul Duke and Dr. Gonzo respectively. However, criticism was mixed, and the film was a box office failure.

=== Graphic novel ===
A graphic novel adaptation of Fear and Loathing in Las Vegas, adapted by Canadian artist Troy Little, was released in October 2015. In interviews, Little said "We decided right off the bat not to go the Steadman route, or be too influenced by the movie either, and draw Johnny Depp and Benicio Del Toro. So we wanted to make it its own unique thing... For me, capturing the manic energy and spirit of the book, and staying true to the feel of Fear and Loathing was my big goal."

== In popular culture ==
"Fear and Loathing on the Planet of Kitson," an episode of the ABC/Marvel Studios superhero series Agents of S.H.I.E.L.D., first broadcast on May 24, 2019, not only takes its title from the novel, it also incorporates plot elements from the novel and 1998 film, particularly around characters having to navigate a casino (in this case a casino on an alien planet) while under the influence of a psychedelic drug.

The 2013 album Too Weird to Live, Too Rare to Die! by Panic! at the Disco (originally from Las Vegas) was named after a line from the movie adaptation of the novel. The quote itself is attributed to Thompson's article "The Banshee Screams For Buffalo Meat" written after Acosta's presumed death.

The music videos for Lil Wayne's "No Worries" and The Weeknd's song "Heartless" draw heavy inspiration from the 1998 film.

Japanese electronicore band Fear, and Loathing in Las Vegas is named after the book and film.

"Bat Country", from the album City of Evil of the band Avenged Sevenfold, is based on the novel, with the title coming from what Raoul Duke says to Dr. Gonzo after seeing huge bats and flying manta rays in his hallucinations, "We can't stop here. This is bat country." The song's music video exemplifies that, referencing numerous scenes from the film.

An achievement in Halo: The Master Chief Collection called "Can't Stop Here, This is Brute Country" is a reference to the line "We can't stop here, this is bat country" from the book and the 1998 film.

A set of cosmetic items in the class-based first-person shooter video game Team Fortress 2 are directly based on one of the outfits that Raoul Duke wears in the book and the 1998 film, both cosmetic items belonging to the Sniper class. The items are named the Hawaiian Hunter and Tropical Camo in-game, respectively.

American post-hardcore band, Piebald, references the book and film in their song, "Fear and Loathing on Cape Cod", off the album We Are the Only Friends We Have.
