= The Kentucky Derby Is Decadent and Depraved =

1970 article by Hunter S. Thompson

"The Kentucky Derby Is Decadent and Depraved" is a sports article written by journalist Hunter S. Thompson on the 1970 Kentucky Derby, which first appeared in Scanlan's Monthly in June of that year. The article marked the birth of what would become known as "gonzo journalism".

== History ==
The idea for the story began at a dinner party at the Aspen, Colorado, home of novelist James Salter. Hunter S. Thompson queried Scanlan's Monthly editor Warren Hinckle, who approved the project and paired Thompson with illustrator Ralph Steadman for the first time.

The genesis of the article has been described by Thompson as akin to "falling down an elevator shaft and landing in a pool of mermaids". Faced with a deadline and without any coherent story for his editors, Thompson began tearing pages from his notebook, numbering them, and sending them to the magazine. Accompanied by Ralph Steadman's sketches (the first of many collaborations between Thompson and Steadman), the resulting story, and the manic, first-person subjectivity that characterized it, were the beginnings of gonzo journalism.

The article is less about the actual Kentucky Derby – indeed, Thompson and Steadman could not actually see the race from their standpoint – than the revelry surrounding the event. Thompson's depiction includes the events in Louisville, his hometown, in the days before and after the Derby, and Steadman captured the debauched atmosphere in his surreal drawings. Thompson provided up-close views of activities in the Derby infield and the grandstand at Churchill Downs, and a running commentary on the drunkenness and lewdness of the crowd, which he states in the article as the only thing he was focusing on. The narrative ends with Thompson and Steadman's realization that, by participating in the drunken pageantry of the event, they had become exactly what they had originally planned to caricature.

Shortly after Thompson's suicide in 2005, Steadman recalled his first impression of Thompson at the Kentucky Derby to the British newspaper The Independent:

I had turned around and two fierce eyes, firmly socketed inside a bullet-shaped head, were staring at a strange growth I was nurturing on the end of my chin. "Holy shit!" [Thompson] exclaimed. "They said I was looking for a matted-haired geek with string warts and I guess I've found him." ...This man had an impressive head chiseled from one piece of bone, and the top part was covered down to his eyes by a floppy-brimmed sun hat. His top half was draped in a loose-fitting hunting jacket of multi-colored patchwork. He wore seersucker blue pants, and the whole torso was pivoted on a pair of huge white plimsolls with a fine red trim around the bulkheads. Damn near 6-foot-6 of solid bone and meat holding a beaten-up leather bag across his knee and a loaded cigarette holder between the arthritic fingers of his other hand.

== Release ==
The article was first released in the June 1970 edition of Scanlan's Monthly. It was later reprinted in Tom Wolfe's 1973 anthology The New Journalism and in Thompson's 1979 anthology The Great Shark Hunt.

=== Reception ===
The article was not widely read at the time, but Thompson did garner attention from other journalists for its unusual style. In 1970, Bill Cardoso, editor of The Boston Globe Sunday Magazine, wrote to Thompson, whom he had met on a bus full of journalists covering the 1968 New Hampshire presidential primaries. Cardoso praised the piece as a breakthrough: "This is it, this is pure Gonzo. If this is a start, keep rolling." Considered the first use of the word "gonzo" to describe Thompson's work, Thompson took to the word right away, and according to Steadman said, "Okay, that's what I do. Gonzo."
