= National Observer (United States) =

Weekly American national newspaper

- Owner: Dow Jones & Company
- Founder: Bernard Kilgore
- Founded: February 4, 1962
- Ceased publication: July 11, 1977
- Headquarters: Washington, D.C.
- Sister newspapers: Wall Street Journal
- ISSN: 0027-9803
- OCLC number: 1759309

The National Observer was a weekly American general-interest national newspaper published by Dow Jones & Company from 1962 until July 11, 1977. Hunter S. Thompson wrote several articles for the National Observer as the correspondent for Latin America early in his career.

The newspaper was the inspiration of Barney Kilgore, then the president of Dow Jones. (Kilgore is credited as the "genius" who transformed the Wall Street Journal from a provincial financial daily with a circulation of 32,000, mostly on Wall Street, into the national giant it became.)

It was Kilgore's idea that the nation needed a weekly national newspaper that would synthesize all the week's events and current trends into an attractive, convenient package. In effect, the National Observer would offer the kind of quality non-financial journalism that the Wall Street Journal once featured in its front-page "leaders" (the articles that occupy the left- and right-hand columns).
