= Scanlan's Monthly =

Monthly publication featuring controversial muckraking journalism

- Cover of the April 1970 issue
- Editor: Warren Hinckle and Sidney Zion
- Frequency: Monthly
- Publisher: Scanlan's Literary House
- First issue: March 1970
- Final issue Number: January 1971; 8
- Country: United States

Scanlan's Monthly was a New York, New York and St. Jean, Quebec monthly publication that ran from March 1970 to January 1971. The publisher was Scanlan's Literary House. Edited by Warren Hinckle and Sidney Zion, it featured politically controversial muckraking and was ultimately subject to an investigation by the FBI during the Nixon administration.

It was boycotted by printers in early 1971 as "un-American". According to the publishers, more than 50 printers refused to handle the January 1971 special issue Guerilla War in the USA because it appeared to be promoting domestic terrorism. The issue was finally printed in Quebec and in a German translation in Stuttgart (Guerilla-Krieg in USA, Deutsche Verlagsanstalt 1971). The magazine produced a total of eight issues; Guerilla War in the USA, was the last.

Scanlan's is best-remembered for featuring several articles by Hunter S. Thompson, and especially for what is considered the first instance of gonzo journalism, Thompson's "The Kentucky Derby Is Decadent and Depraved". Thompson's articles from this period are collected with others in The Great Shark Hunt.

In the magazine, its name was described as being that of a "universally despised Irish pig farmer".

The September 1970 issue included an editorial entitled, "Nixon And The Bums", with an accompanying picture of President Richard M. Nixon having lunch with a group of construction union leaders who attended the so-called White House Hard Hat Luncheon. The editorial identified each of the individuals and enumerated each one's alleged criminal record. To advertise the issue, Scanlan's ran two full-page ads in the New York Times, which were noticed by the White House. This was the primary reason for the enmity that ensued in Washington.

Scanlan's is also remembered for its catchy subscription-ad slogan, "You Trust Your Mother But You Cut the Cards", adapted from "Thrust ivrybody—but cut th' ca-ards." expressed in dialect by Finley Peter Dunne's character "Mr. Dooley" in Mr. Dooley's Philosophy (1900), p. 260.
