= Gonzo journalism =

Style of journalism

The "Gonzo fist", characterized by two thumbs and four fingers holding a peyote button, was originally used in Hunter S. Thompson's 1970 campaign for sheriff of Pitkin County, Colorado. It has since evolved into a symbol for gonzo journalism.

Gonzo journalism is a style of journalism that is written without claims of objectivity, often including the reporter as part of the story using a first-person narrative. The word "gonzo" is believed to have been first used in 1970 to describe an article about the Kentucky Derby by Hunter S. Thompson, who popularized the style. It is an energetic first-person participatory writing style in which the author is a protagonist, and it draws its power from a combination of social critique and self-satire. It has since been applied to other subjective artistic endeavors.

Gonzo journalism involves an approach to accuracy that concerns the reporting of personal experiences and emotions, in contrast to traditional journalism, which favors a detached style and relies on facts or quotations that can be verified by third parties. Gonzo journalism disregards the strictly edited product once favored by newspaper media and strives for a more personal approach; the personality of a piece is as important as the event or actual subject of the piece. Use of sarcasm, humour, exaggeration, and profanity is common.

Thompson, who was among the forefathers of the New Journalism movement, said in the February 15, 1973, issue of Rolling Stone, "If I'd written the truth I knew for the past ten years, about 600 people—including me—would be rotting in prison cells from Rio to Seattle today. Absolute truth is a very rare and dangerous commodity in the context of professional journalism."

== Etymology ==
The term gonzo was first used in connection with Hunter S. Thompson by The Boston Globe magazine editor Bill Cardoso in 1970. He described Thompson's article "The Kentucky Derby Is Decadent and Depraved", which was written for the June 1970 edition of Scanlan's Monthly, as "pure Gonzo journalism". This predates the December 1970 debut of the Muppet Gonzo in The Great Santa Claus Switch. Cardoso said gonzo was South Boston Irish slang describing the last man standing after an all-night drinking marathon. He also said it was a corruption of the Canadian French word gonzeaux, which means 'shining path', although this is disputed.

"Gonzo", 1960 song by James Booker

Another speculation is that the word may have been inspired by the 1960 hit song "Gonzo" by the rhythm and blues pianist James Booker. This possibility is supported by a 2007 oral biography of Thompson, which states that the term is taken from a song by Booker but does not explain why Thompson or Cardoso would have chosen the term to describe Thompson's journalism. The 2013 documentary Bayou Maharaja: The Tragic Genius of James Booker quotes Thompson's literary executor as saying that the song was the origin of the term. According to a Greg Johnson biographical note on Booker, the song title "Gonzo" comes from a character in a movie called The Pusher, which in turn may have been inspired by a 1956 Evan Hunter novel of the same title.

In 2025, David S. Wills, author of High White Notes: The Rise and Fall of Gonzo Journalism, investigated the origins of the word "gonzo" and discovered that Cardoso had found it in an article he had edited for The Boston Globe Sunday Magazine just a week prior to calling Thompson's story "pure Gonzo journalism." The article was about countercultural icon Baba Ram Dass and "gonzo" was used "with the context suggesting 'going wild' or 'losing control' on a hallucinogenic substance." The original article said that Dass "smoked pot and went gonzo on STP, the most powerful hallucinogenic ever concocted."

== Hunter S. Thompson ==
Thompson based his style on William Faulkner's notion that "fiction is often the best fact". While the things that Thompson wrote about are basically true, he used satirical devices to drive his points home. He often wrote about recreational drugs and alcohol use, which added subjective flair to his reporting. The term "gonzo" has also come into (sometimes pejorative) use to describe journalism in Thompson's style, characterized by a drug-fueled stream of consciousness writing technique.

Fear and Loathing in Las Vegas followed the Mint 400 piece in 1971 and included a main character by the name of Raoul Duke, accompanied by his attorney, Dr. Gonzo, with defining art by Ralph Steadman. Although this book is considered a prime example of gonzo journalism, Thompson regarded it as a failed experiment. He had intended it to be an unedited record of everything he did as it happened, but he edited the book five times before publication.

Thompson would instigate events himself, often in a prankish or belligerent manner, and then document both his actions and those of others. Notoriously neglectful of deadlines, Thompson often annoyed his editors because he submitted articles late, "too late to be edited, yet still in time for the printer". Thompson wanted his work to be read as he wrote it, in its "true Gonzo" form. Historian Douglas Brinkley said gonzo journalism requires virtually no rewriting and frequently uses transcribed interviews and verbatim telephone conversations.

"I don't get any satisfaction out of the old traditional journalist's view: 'I just covered the story. I just gave it a balanced view,'" Thompson said in an interview for the online edition of The Atlantic. "Objective journalism is one of the main reasons American politics has been allowed to be so corrupt for so long. You can't be objective about Nixon."

== Influence and legacy ==
Thompson felt that objectivity in journalism was a myth. Gonzo journalism has now become a bona fide style of writing that is similar to the New Journalism of the 1960s, led primarily by Tom Wolfe and also championed by Lester Bangs, George Plimpton, Terry Southern, and John Birmingham, and is considered a subgenre of New Journalism. When asked whether there was a difference between the two, Thompson answered, "Yeah, I think so. Unlike Tom Wolfe or Gay Talese, for instance, I almost never try to reconstruct a story. They're both much better reporters than I am, but then I don't really think of myself as a reporter."

In 1998, Christopher Locke asserted that the webzine genre is descended from gonzo journalism, a claim that has since been extended to social media. Thompson's gonzo journalism influence is reflected in the current website Gonzo Today which features a top banner by Thompson's longtime illustrator Ralph Steadman, with rotating contributions by others including Thompson associate, poet Ron Whitehead.

It has been claimed that Thai writer Rong Wongsawan wrote in a style that was Gonzo, beginning in the 1960s when he reported from San Francisco. However, he wrote in Thai, and he probably developed the style independently of Hunter S. Thompson. He also used the style in his books Sattahip and Takli which describe American soldiers and Thai bar girls during the Vietnam War. His book The Man from Bangkok: San Francisco Culture in the 60s is an English translation of a book published in Thai in 1978.

Work of James O'Keefe and Jim Acosta has been compared to gonzo journalism.

== Aspects of Gonzo journalism ==
Jesse Jarnow states the main parts of Gonzo journalism are total subjectivity and the first/best draft mentality. This mentality is described by William McKeen, a journalism professor at Boston University and author of Outlaw Journalist: The Life and Times of Hunter S. Thompson, as where the journalist does “virtually no rewriting”. He adds that everything within the reporting process is documented, including notes, interviews, transcribed telephone conversations, telegrams, etc. Jason Mosser states that Gonzo journalism is unique because of how it places the narrator as the center of the story. Still, gonzo journalism relies primarily on being grounded in the truth.

Thompson believed primarily in all of these aspects of Gonzo journalism; however, he was also quoted as sharing a similar affinity with George Orwell of making political writing into art. Thompson’s style of writing relied heavily on verb-driven syntax along with metaphors, allusions, ellipsis and more. Critics essay this was used to create feelings of despair, degradation, and desperation within his narrators.

The Gonzo Studies Society proposes eleven features that, to varying degrees, are included in Hunter S. Thompson's Gonzo journalism:

- Subjectivity
- Immediacy (using notes, transcripts, etc.)
- A blend of fact and fiction
- Dark comedy
- A peculiar lexis
- Some kind of sidekick figure
- Hyperbole and/or fantasy
- Drug use
- Violence
- Digressions
- Conspiratorial tone

== Gonzo journalism in other countries ==
Millar is an example of gonzo journalism outside of the United States. Millar is a Uzbekistan television news program. As of September 2025, the program has 27,500 subscribers on YouTube. Though the television is regarded as slightly controversial due to its usage of sensationalism and staged footage, scholars in the field regard it as partially fitting the category of Gonzo journalism. Scholars argue the program counts as Gonzo journalism because of the subjective tone, perspectives of those involved, and internal coverage.

== Ethical concerns ==
Scholars' concerns regarding Gonzo journalism primarily surround Gonzo journalism's subjective tone and free-style approach to journalism. Scholars worry that this creates conflicting ideas about how to carry out journalistic ethics and integrity while reporting. Others state this makes journalists "moral arbiters of the news". Those who argue against the inclusion of subjectivity within journalism point to the possibility of journalists allowing their audience to live within their own reality without any shared common knowledge between readers of one news source and readers of another. Scholars and people in favor of objectivity rather than subjectivity argue that objectivity allows for public figures and civilians to gather reliable information consistently and easily, allowing them to use "facts to base their opinions on".

== See also ==
- Citizen journalism
- Creative nonfiction
- Embedded journalism
- Gonzo pornography
- Hamilton Morris
- Immersion Journalism
- New Games Journalism
- New Journalism
- Non fiction novel
- Reportage
- Roman à clef
- Shane Smith
- Transmetropolitan
- Post Modern literature

== General sources ==
- Bowe, Brian J. (Spring 2012). "A Brain Full of Contraband: The Islamic Gonzo Writing of Michael Muhammad Knight" (PDF). Literary Journalism Studies. Archived (PDF) from the original on 2014-01-08.
- "Gonzo". Lexico Dictionaries. Archived from the original on October 25, 2019.
- Hirst, Martin (January 19, 2004). "What is Gonzo? The Etymology of an Urban Legend" (PDF). University of Queensland. Archived from the original (PDF) on April 14, 2008.
- Kahn, Ashley; George-Warren, Holly; Dahl, Shawn, eds. (1998). The Seventies: A Tumultuous Decade Reconsidered. Little, Brown and Company. ISBN 0-316-75914-7.
- Thompson, Hunter S. (1971). Fear and Loathing in Las Vegas: A Savage Journey to the Heart of the American Dream. Random House. ISBN 0-679-78589-2.
- Thompson, Hunter S. (1997). The Proud Highway: Saga of a Desperate Southern Gentleman. Villard. ISBN 0-679-40695-6.
- Thompson, Hunter S. (2000). Fear and Loathing in America: The Brutal Odyssey of an Outlaw Journalist. Simon & Schuster. ISBN 0-684-87315-X.
- Wenner, Jann S.; Seymour, Corey (2007). Gonzo: The Life of Hunter S. Thompson, An Oral Biography. Little, Brown and Company. ISBN 978-0316005272.
