= Duane Boutte =

American actor, director, composer (born 1966)

Duane Boutté (born March 5, 1966) is an American actor, director, and composer known in film for his portrayal of "Bostonia" in Nigel Finch's Stonewall (1995), and as young "Bruce Nugent" in Rodney Evans' Brother to Brother (2004). Boutté was in the original Broadway company of Parade, and played "Enoch Snow, Jr." in the 1994 TONY Award-winning revival of Carousel. His television acting credits date from the 1980s and include episodes of What's Happening Now, A Year in the Life, Sex and the City, and the made-for-television movie The Drug Knot, directed by Happy Days star, Anson Williams.

== Early life ==
Duane Boutté was born and raised in Fresno, California where his mother (Velda Neal Boutte) taught piano. Boutté's father, Alfred Boutte, is an Air Force veteran and was regional administrator for California's Employment Development Department. Boutté's parents were active in community programs, particularly those advancing opportunities for Fresno's black citizens, and are honored in Fresno's African American History Museum. Duane Boutté is the youngest of the couple's seven children. Though coming to California from east Texas, Boutté's paternal family has its Creole roots in Louisiana. Boutté began taking piano lessons from his mother when he was a toddler, and started composing music at age 4 that his mother would then transcribe.

In 1979, Boutté's parents took him to Roger Rocka's Music Hall in Fresno to see Anything Goes performed by Good Company Players (GCP). The musical was preceded by a 15-minute pre-show of song and dance by the troupe's "Junior Company." Boutté auditioned and was accepted into Junior Company later that year. Boutté, then 13, would perform six shows each week for the next three years, taking just two weeks off each year for family vacation. He calls GCP the place where he learned "important...life lessons [like] commitment, responsibility, showing up on time ready, really ready, to work." In GCP's Junior Company, Boutté worked alongside youngsters who would later become his Broadway colleagues (Audra McDonald, Heidi Blickenstaff, Sharon Leal, Andrea Chamberlain, and Sarah Uriarte Berry). Boutté also performed in plays and musicals with the senior company, mostly under the direction of company founder, Dan Pessano, and gained his first television experience in Junior Company's local Saturday morning variety shows, and holiday specials.

== Career ==
Duane Boutté's early career was managed by Summer of '42 actress Jennifer O'Neill. In these years ('86-'88), Boutté filmed episodes of What's Happening Now, A Year in the Life and a made-for-TV movie directed by Anson Williams, and starring Dermot Mulroney. Boutte completed his B.A. in theatre at UCLA, and earned an M.F.A. in acting under Tony Church at the National Theatre Conservatory in Denver before moving to New York in 1991. That year, Boutté toured the U.S. with Jeffrey Wright, Rainn Wilson and other young actors in The Acting Company's A Midsummer Night's Dream. In 1994, he played "Enoch Snow, Jr." in Lincoln Center's TONY Award-winning revival of Carousel, and was one of Michael Hayden's "Billy Bigelow" understudies. Boutté returned to Broadway in 1999 in Parade. He has performed numerous roles in classical and contemporary plays Off-Broadway and at leading regional theatres throughout the country. In 2001, Boutté played "Orestes" in the Oresteia trilogy directed by Tony Taccone and Stephen Wadsworth, inaugurating Berkeley Repertory Theatre's new RODA Theatre. Among his favorite roles performed, Boutté names "Mercutio" at Oregon Shakespeare Festival, and opportunities to premiere works by playwrights like Terrence McNally, Eric Overmyer, Charles Randolph-Wright, and Robert O'Hara. Of note among his premieres are Kirsten Childs' Off-Broadway musical The Bubbly Black Girl Sheds Her Chameleon Skin (Playwrights Horizons), and Brian Freeman's play Civil Sex in which Boutté played civil rights activist Bayard Rustin (Berkeley Repertory Theatre). In New York, Boutté has been listed among Vineyard Theatre's esteemed "Community of Artists."

Boutté stars in two films that have become landmarks in gay cinema. The first of these, Stonewall (1995), was directed by Nigel Finch (The Lost Language of Cranes). In the film, Boutté plays "Bostonia," a fictional 'mother' of the Stonewall Inn, whose imagined, first punch incites this film's version of the 1969 Stonewall riots. Interview magazine profiled Boutté for his performance in the role, stating "a Stonewall star is born." He was the first of the film's actors to come out as gay in an interview with 4-Front magazine that year. Boutté later played "Bruce Nugent, young" in Rodney Evans' 2004 film Brother to Brother. The film, also starring Anthony Mackie and Roger Robinson, presents circa 1920's Bruce Nugent as an unapologetic homosexual accepted, and embraced by celebrated Harlem Renaissance figures like Langston Hughes, and Zora Neale Hurston.

Boutté has directed plays and musicals in regional theatres and universities, and has collaborated as composer on new musicals including Lyin' Up a Breeze (presented by Good Company Players in 2002), and Caravaggio Chiaroscuro (performed at LaMama Etc. in 2007). He has taught acting at Illinois State University), National Theatre Institute, Ramapo College, and directed work at Stella Adler Studio of Acting in New York.

== Feature films ==
Year	Title	Role
1995	Stonewall	Bostonia
2002	Checkout	Almo
2004	Brother to Brother	Bruce Nugent, young
2007	You Belong to Me	Robert
2013	All is Bright	Man 1

== Television ==
Year	Title	Role	Episode
1986	What's Happening Now	Howard	Season 2: "Picture Perfect"
1986	What's Happening Now	Howard	Season 2: "Shirley's Little Sister"
1986	CBS Schoolbreak Special	Leon	"The Drug Knot"
1986	The Drug Knot	Leon	TV movie
1987	A Year in the Life	Co-Star "student"	"While Someone Else is Eating or Opening a Window"
1998	Sex and the City	Allanne	"Oh Come All Ye Faithful"
2018	Unbreakable Kimmy Schmidt	Principal Webb	"Kimmy Disrupts a Paradigm"

== Web series ==
Year	Title	Role	Episode/Notes
2012-13	Child of the '70s	Weezy	Four episodes: Happy Birthday Darling, Kiki Lawrence, The Wedding, The Wedding Part 2

== Broadway ==
Year	Show	Credit	Theatre
1994	Carousel (Broadway Revival)	Enoch Snow Jr., and understudy Billy Bigelow	Vivian Beaumont Theater
1998	Parade	Ensemble, and principle understudy	Vivian Beaumont Theater

== Off-Broadway ==
Year	Show	Credit	Notes
1992	A Midsummer Night's Dream national tour	Francis Flute, Thisby	The Acting Company
1993	The Heliotrope Bouquet by Scott Joplin and Louis Chauvin	Louis Chauvin	Playwrights Horizons
1993	Motherlode	Revolutionary	Mabou Mines
1993	Christina Alberta's Father	Teddy	Vineyard Theatre (workshop)
1999	Civil Sex	Bayard Rustin	Public Theatre "First Stages"
2000	The Bubbly Black Girl Sheds Her Chameleon Skin	Larry Grimble, and Keith	Playwrights Horizons, world premiere

== Regional Stage ==
Year	Show	Role	Notes
1990	Twelfth Night	Fabian	Berkeley Shakespeare Festival
1990	Cymbeline	Philharmonus	Berkeley Shakespeare Festival
1990	The Merry Wives of Windsor	Fenton	Berkeley Shakespeare Festival
1990	Othello	Clown	Berkeley Shakespeare Festival
1990	The American Clock	Rudy	Denver Center Theatre Company
1991	Joe Turner's Come and Gone	Jeremy	Denver Center Theatre Company
1991-92	A Midsummer Night's Dream national tour	Francis Flute, Thisby	The Acting Company
1992	Riverview	Robert	Goodman Theatre
1993	Six Degrees of Separation	Paul	Dallas Theater Center
1995	Insurrection	Ron	Columbia University, world premiere
1995	A Midsummer Night's Dream	Demetrius	La Jolla Playhouse
1997	Civil Sex	Bayard Rustin	Woolly Mammoth Theatre Company
1998	Les Blancs	Eric	Center Stage, Baltimore
1998	Afterplay	Raziel	Coconut Grove Playhouse
1999	Blues for an Alabama Sky	Guy	Virginia Stage Company
2000	Civil Sex	Bayard Rustin	Berkeley Repertory Theatre
2000	The Odyssey	Neoman	McCarter Theatre
2000	The Odyssey	Neoman	Seattle Repertory Theatre
2001	Oresteia	Orestes	Berkeley Repertory Theatre
2002	Hamlet	Laertes	Alabama Shakespeare Festival
2002	Much Ado About Nothing	Claudio	Alabama Shakespeare Festival
2003	Romeo and Juliet	Mercutio	Oregon Shakespeare Festival
2003	Antony and Cleopatra	Pompey, and Eros	Oregon Shakespeare Festival
2004	The Story	Neil	Long Wharf Theatre
2005	The Tempest	Ferdinand	Shakespeare Theatre Company
2005	Cuttin' Up	Various	Arena Stage, world premiere
2006	Some Men	Angel Eyes	Philadelphia Theatre Company, world premiere
2007	Cuttin' Up	Various	Alliance Theatre
2007	Caravaggio Chiaroscuro	Caravaggio	La MaMa Experimental Theatre Club
2008	Macbeth	Macduff	Roust Theatre Company
2009	The Whipping Man	John	Penumbra Theatre Company
2010	On the Verge	Grover, et al.	Rep Stage
2012	Shadows	Ben	Hoi Polloi
2012	Fierce Love	Various	PomoAfroHomo anniversary tour (New Conservatory Theatre)
2012	All Hands	Various	Hoi Polloi
2013	Wild With Happy	Mo	TheatreWorks

== Stage Direction ==
Year	Show	Notes
2008	LOL	Algonquin Productions (NY)
2011	Stalag 17	Good Company Players (CA)
2012	Othello	Stella Adler Studio (NY)
2013	Home	Rep Stage (MD)
2014	The Merry Wives of Windsor	Worcester Shakespeare Festival
2015	Cabaret	Illinois State University
2015	Fences	Illinois State University

== Musical Compositions and Librettos ==
Year	Show	Credit	Notes
1987	Bottom's Up: A Musicommedia	Music - Duane Boutté, book - Ron Morasco, lyrics - Ron Mohasco, Dwight Smith, Paul Svendson, Luck Hari	Produced at UCLA; winner ACTF and ASCAP awards 1988
2002	Lyin' Up a Breeze	Book and lyrics - Terry Miller, music - Duane Boutté	Produced by Good Company Players, Second Space Theatre
2007	Caravaggio Chiaroscuro	Book - Gian Marco Lo Forte, Music - Duane Boutté	Produced by LaMama Etc. (2007)
2011	Thanks to the Lighthouse	Music and Libretto by Duane Boutté	Presented 2011 and 2012 by NYC Parks and Recreation, and Historic House Trust
