= CBS Schoolbreak Special =

1978 American TV series

- Titular screenshot
- Also known as: CBS Afternoon Playhouse
- Country of origin: United States
- Original language: English
- No. of seasons: 18
- No. of episodes: 89

Production
- Running time: 60 minutes
- Production company: CBS Productions

Original release
- Network: CBS
- Release: December 4, 1978 – January 23, 1996

CBS Schoolbreak Special is an American anthology series for teenagers that aired on CBS from December 1978 to January 1996. The series began under the title CBS Afternoon Playhouse, and was changed during the 1984–85 season. The concept was similar to ABC's Afterschool Special.

== List of specials ==
=== Afternoon Playhouse specials ===
Under its original name, the Afternoon Playhouse aired a handful of made-for-TV films, the most notable of which was the 1983 release of Revenge of the Nerd. The TV special was often mistaken for the film of a similar name which premiered one year later in 1984.

==== Season 1 (1978) ====
No. overall	No. in season	Title	Directed by	Written by	Original release date
1	1	"Joey and Redhawk: Part 1"	Larry Elikann	Art Wallace	December 4, 1978
A suburban kid from the Midwest, his dad, and a Colorado Apache must join forces to try to survive in the Rocky Mountains. Note Guest stars: Chris Petersen, Guillermo San Juan, Bert Kramer, Hersha Parady, Bob Hastings, Stephen Furst, Lucille Benson, Danny Bonaduce, Ron Godines, Joshua Gallegos, Monika Ramirez, Lois Red Elk, Frank Salsedo, Scott Durnavich, and Eric Stoltz
2	2	"Joey and Redhawk: Part 2"	Larry Elikann	Art Wallace	December 5, 1978
A suburban kid from the Midwest, his dad, and a Colorado Apache must join forces to try to survive in the Rocky Mountains. Note Guest stars: Chris Petersen, Guillermo San Juan, Bert Kramer, Hersha Parady, Bob Hastings, Stephen Furst, Lucille Benson, Danny Bonaduce, Ron Godines, Joshua Gallegos, Monika Ramirez, Lois Red Elk, Frank Salsedo, Scott Durnavich, and Eric Stoltz
3	3	"Joey and Redhawk: Part 3"	Larry Elikann	Art Wallace	December 6, 1978
A suburban kid from the Midwest, his dad, and a Colorado Apache must join forces to try to survive in the Rocky Mountains. Note Guest stars: Chris Petersen, Guillermo San Juan, Bert Kramer, Hersha Parady, Bob Hastings, Stephen Furst, Lucille Benson, Danny Bonaduce, Ron Godines, Joshua Gallegos, Monika Ramirez, Lois Red Elk, Frank Salsedo, Scott Durnavich, and Eric Stoltz
4	4	"Joey and Redhawk: Part 4"	Larry Elikann	Art Wallace	December 7, 1978
A suburban kid from the Midwest, his dad, and a Colorado Apache must join forces to try to survive in the Rocky Mountains. Note Guest stars: Chris Petersen, Guillermo San Juan, Bert Kramer, Hersha Parady, Bob Hastings, Stephen Furst, Lucille Benson, Danny Bonaduce, Ron Godines, Joshua Gallegos, Monika Ramirez, Lois Red Elk, Frank Salsedo, Scott Durnavich, and Eric Stoltz
5	5	"Joey and Redhawk: Part 5"	Larry Elikann	Art Wallace	December 8, 1978
A suburban kid from the Midwest, his dad and, a Colorado Apache must join forces to try to survive in the Rocky Mountains. Note Guest stars: Chris Petersen, Guillermo San Juan, Bert Kramer, Hersha Parady, Bob Hastings, Stephen Furst, Lucille Benson, Danny Bonaduce, Ron Godines, Joshua Gallegos, Monika Ramirez, Lois Red Elk, Frank Salsedo, Scott Durnavich, and Eric Stoltz

==== Season 2 (1979–80) ====
No. overall	No. in season	Title	Directed by	Written by	Original release date
6	1	"Year of the Gentle Tiger"	Dennis Kane	Barney Cohen	November 23, 1979
A teenager is determined to win his father's respect by winning the gold medal in Judo at the Junior Olympics. Note Guest stars: Lance LeGault, Keenan Shimizu, Anthony Candell, Jeff Edmond, Karen Anthony, George Harris, and Henry Calvert
7	2	"The House That Half-Jack Built"	Stephen Gyllenhaal	Teleplay by : Fred Freiberger & Paul C. Elliot; Novel by: Eloise Engle	January 3, 1980
A 13-year-old is pressured by his pals to try drugs. Note Guest stars: Tim Rail, Carol Lawrence, Aiden McNulty, Mark Neely, Patrick Collins, Karlene Crockett, Stan Wells, and Roberta Jean Williams
8	3	"One Last Ride - Part 1"	Gerald Mayer	Richard H. Landau	April 7, 1980
Following the death of his estranged ex-wife, a rodeo champion must now take care of a son he never knew he had. Note Guest stars: Ronny Cox, David Hollander, Carmen Zapata, Andrew Duggan, Cathey Paine, Norman Howell, Louise Lorimer, Timothy Blake, Harry Caesar, Robert Emhardt, William Bryant, Paul Larson, Ed Ness, Kenny Call, Ron Roy, Chuck Henson, and Larry McKinney
9	4	"One Last Ride - Part 2"	Gerald Mayer	Richard H. Landau	April 8, 1980
Following the death of his estranged ex-wife, a rodeo champion must now take care of a son he never knew he had. Note Guest stars: Ronny Cox, David Hollander, Carmen Zapata, Andrew Duggan, Cathey Paine, Norman Howell, Louise Lorimer, Timothy Blake, Harry Caesar, Robert Emhardt, William Bryant, Paul Larson, Ed Ness, Kenny Call, Ron Roy, Chuck Henson, and Larry McKinney
10	5	"One Last Ride - Part 3"	Gerald Mayer	Richard H. Landau	April 9, 1980
Following the death of his estranged ex-wife, a rodeo champion must now take care of a son he never knew he had. Note Guest stars: Ronny Cox, David Hollander, Carmen Zapata, Andrew Duggan, Cathey Paine, Norman Howell, Louise Lorimer, Timothy Blake, Harry Caesar, Robert Emhardt, William Bryant, Paul Larson, Ed Ness, Kenny Call, Ron Roy, Chuck Henson, and Larry McKinney
11	6	"One Last Ride - Part 4"	Gerald Mayer	Richard H. Landau	April 10, 1980
Following the death of his estranged ex-wife, a rodeo champion must now take care of a son he never knew he had. Note Guest stars: Ronny Cox, David Hollander, Carmen Zapata, Andrew Duggan, Cathey Paine, Norman Howell, Louise Lorimer, Timothy Blake, Harry Caesar, Robert Emhardt, William Bryant, Paul Larson, Ed Ness, Kenny Call, Ron Roy, Chuck Henson, and Larry McKinney
12	7	"One Last Ride - Part 5"	Gerald Mayer	Richard H. Landau	April 11, 1980
Following the death of his estranged ex-wife, a rodeo champion must now take care of a son he never knew he had. Note Guest stars: Ronny Cox, David Hollander, Carmen Zapata, Andrew Duggan, Cathey Paine, Norman Howell, Louise Lorimer, Timothy Blake, Harry Caesar, Robert Emhardt, William Bryant, Paul Larson, Ed Ness, Kenny Call, Ron Roy, Chuck Henson, and Larry McKinney
13	8	"Lost in Death Valley"	Stephen Gyllenhaal	Story by : Barney Cohen & Dennis Kane; Teleplay by : Stephen Gyllenhaal	April 19, 1980
After their plane crashes in Death Valley, a group of teenagers struggle to survive the searing heat, while waiting for help to arrive. Note Guest stars: Leslie Winston, Bennett Liss, David Knell, Mark Miyama, Guy Boyd, Barbara Tarbuck, Paul Kent, and Grace Zabriskie

==== Season 3 (1981) ====
No. overall	No. in season	Title	Directed by	Written by	Original release date
14	1	"The Great Gilly Hopkins"	Jeffrey Hayden	Teleplay by : Charles Pratt Jr. Novel by: Katherine Paterson	January 19, 1981
An unwanted foster child is bounced around the system as she looks for a home. Note Guest stars: Tricia Cast, Conchata Ferrell, Edith Atwater, Tyne Daly, Joel Fluellen, Kari Ann Patterson, and Ricky Slyter
15	2	"I Think I'm Having a Baby"	Arthur Allan Seidelman	Blossom Elfman	March 3, 1981
Laurie is fifteen and she thinks she is pregnant. Her boyfriend does not care. Her mother does not know. Why did it happen? And whom can she turn to? Note Guest stars: Jennifer Jason Leigh, Shawn Stevens, Bobbi Block, Shane Sinutko. Helen Hunt, Tracey Gold, Susan Niven, Sheila Scott-Wilkenson, David Birney, Ron Asher, Marc Copage, Shirlee Kong, Kipp Lennon, Claudio Martínez, Yvonne Perez, and Ally Sheedy
16	3	"Me and Mr. Stenner"	Sigmund Neufeld Jr.	Teleplay by : Corey Blechman; Novel by: Evan Hunter	June 2, 1981
An 11-year-old girl finds it difficult to accept her mother's re-marriage, and her new step-father. Note Guest stars: April Gilpin, David Ogden Stiers, Bobbie Ferguson, Frederick Tully, Bubba Larramore, Joseph William Galt, Bill Martin, and Lee Ritchey

==== Season 4 (1981–82) ====
No. overall	No. in season	Title	Directed by	Written by	Original release date
17	1	"Portrait of a Teenage Shoplifter"	William P. D'Angelo	Story by : Todd Kessler; Teleplay by : Deborah Baker & Todd Kessler	December 1, 1981
With her life going nowhere, aspiring dancer Karen Hughes drowns her sorrows in the thrill of shoplifting. Ultimately she is caught in the act, and her entire future goes up in smoke. Note Guest stars: Maureen Teefy, Allen Fawcett, Laura Dean, Katherine Gene Kamhi, Jessica Cain, Marilyn Rockafellow, Marisa Morell, Thomas Quinn, Christina-Avis Krauss, William Schilling, Joe Spinell, Elaine Swann, Martha Gallub, Deborah Malone, Buddy Short, John Scott, George Vlismas, and Donna Phillips
18	2	"Dangerous Company"	Lamont Johnson	Teleplay by : Christopher Keane; Novel by: Raymond Johnson & Mona McCormick	February 9, 1982
The true story of Ray Johnson, a convict who spent most of his life in and out of prison until he finally decided to turn his life around. Note Guest stars: Beau Bridges, Carlos Brown, Karen Carlson, Jan Sterling, Kene Holliday, Ralph Macchio, Max Wright, Shizuko Hoshi, Dale Ishimoto, Chris Mulkey, Buck Taylor, Ward Wood, Raymond Johnson, Christopher Keane, Thomas H. Middleton, David McKnight, Eric Gold, Peter Brunt, David Hall, Patrick Rowe, Sue Rihr, Steven M. Porter, Frank F. Muhr, Ralph Meyering Jr., Anna Lynn Brown, and Robert Coad
19	3	"Journey to Survival"	Richard Bennett	Adam Dubov	April 6, 1982
Six troubled teens take part in a wilderness adventure program, in the hopes that it will teach them more about themselves and each other. Note Guest stars: Ralph Macchio, James G. Richardson, Sal Lopez, Dori Brenner, Larry B. Scott, Leon Robinson, David Greenlee, Grant Gottschall, and Phyllis Guerrini
20	4	"The Shooting"	Michael Ray Rhodes	Josef Anderson	June 2, 1982
A group of three boys are involved in a hunting accident, and find that their lives will be changed forever. Note Guest stars: Lance Kerwin, Gavin Muir, Wil Wheaton, Lynn Redgrave, Barry Primus, Woodrow Parfrey, John Quade, Ivy Bethune, Michael Greene, John O'Brien, Fritz Anderberg, Sara Grunwald, Shane Kerwin, and William Martinelli

==== Season 5 (1982–83) ====
No. overall	No. in season	Title	Directed by	Written by	Original release date
21	1	"Just Pals"	Randa Haines	Story by : Nick Anderson & Gretchen Ebrahim; Teleplay by : H.B. Kay	September 15, 1982
A 13-year-old boy finds it hard to continue his friendship with the neighborhood tomboy, who is beginning to become more ladylike. Note Guest stars: Heather McAdam, Byron Thames, Arthur Peterson, Sandy Lipton, Terrence O'Connor, Richard McKenzie, Linda Hoy, Shelly Juttner, Marc Gilpin, Shana O'Neil, Rachel Goslins, John 'Bunky' Butler, Brian Andrews, and Mara Alexander
22	2	"Help Wanted"	Stephen Gyllenhaal	Elizabeth Clark	October 12, 1982
The Welsh family is hit hard when the father is laid off from his factory job, and there are no jobs in sight. Note Guest stars: Kevin Dobson, Dee Wallace, Melanie Gaffin, K.C. Martel, Tricia Cast, Arlene Golonka, Don Sherman, Kristoff St. John, Raymond Singer, Ryan MacDonald, and Mariah Dobson
23	3	"Secret Agent Boy"	Jay Daniel	John Whelpley	November 26, 1982
Wanting to impress a girl, a 12-year-old boy tells her he is a CIA Agent. But soon he finds himself in the midst of a real-life spy caper. Note Guest stars: Victor G. Hill III, Kristin Cumming, Kathryn Leigh Scott, Arthur Rosenberg, Judith-Marie Bergan, Taylor Lacher, and Harold Sylvester
24	4	"Revenge of the Nerd"	Ken Kwapis	John McNamara	April 19, 1983
Class brain Bertram Cummings (Jacobs) is tired of being picked on at school. He decides to use his brainpower to exact revenge against his tormentors. The special was perhaps the best known of the Schoolbreak programs, due to the release a year later of the similarly named film Revenge of the Nerds. Note Guest stars: Manny Jacobs, Christopher J. Barnes, Sarah Inglis, Robert Weiler, Brian Lima, Herb Downer, Jean De Baer, Pamela Burrell, Tenney Walsh, Edd Gasper, Matthew Vipond, April Lerman, JD Cullum, Wendell Brown, Bonnie Deroski, and Frankie Scasso

=== Schoolbreak Specials ===
==== Season 1 (January 24 – June 12, 1984) ====
Episode	Synopsis
Dead Wrong: The John Evans Story	Convicted of murder and set for execution, John Evans tells his story to the prison chaplain. Starring John Laughlin, and Timothy Gibbs.
Welcome Home, Jellybean	The story of Geraldine Oxley, a cognitively deficient 12-year-old girl whose parents remove her from the institution where she has been raised in order to give her a normal-as-possible home life. Christopher Collet stars as her elder brother.
All the Kids Do It	The consequences of driving under the influence are suffered by a teenager (Scott Baio) who has earned them, and by his family, who have not. Directed by Henry Winkler; co-starring Barbara Bosson and George Dzundza as Baio's parents, Jeremy Licht as Baio's brother, and featuring Danny DeVito.
The Alfred G. Graebner Memorial High School Handbook of Rules and Regulations	Teenagers from diverse backgrounds experience their freshman year in high school, in this adaptation of the same-titled novel. Starring Fisher Stevens and Suzanne Snyder.

==== Season 2 (October 16, 1984 – April 23, 1985) ====
Episode	Synopsis
Hear Me Cry	Two high school sophomores decide to make a suicide pact. Starring Lee Montgomery and Robert MacNaughton. Co-starring Claudia Wells and Elinor Donahue.
Contract for Life: The S.A.D.D. Story	The true story of high school hockey coach Bob Anastas (Stephen Macht). After losing two of his finest players to alcohol-related car crashes, Anastas gets their teammates — and the players' families — to prevent more tragedies by forming Students Against Driving Drunk. Co-starring Nicky Katt, Timothy Gibbs, Don Dubbins (The D.I.), and William Zabka.
The Exchange Student	Teenager from India comes to the US to live with her American 'sister'.
The Day the Senior Class Got Married	Students are paired off in a make-believe marriage class, so they can learn how money problems can affect a marriage. Based on the novel by Gloria D. Miklowitz.
Ace Hits the Big Time	On his first day at Manhattan's Kennedy High, 16-year-old Horace "Ace" Hobart (Rob Stone) wears an eyepatch to class. Consequently, he is urged to join a gang of street youths who run the school, or do they? Co-starring James LeGros. Adapted from the book of the same name by Barbara Murphy.
Student Court	When a teenager is caught shoplifting, she decides to stand before a jury of her peers, rather than face judgement from a Juvenile Court. Co-starring Marcelino Sanchez and Moosie Drier.

==== Season 3 (October 22, 1985 – April 1, 1986) ====
Episode	Synopsis
The War Between the Classes	In this Emmy Award-winning adaptation, racial discrimination is examined when a high school teacher assigns his students to play "The Color Game", thus dividing the youngsters into different social classes. Based on the same-titled novel by Gloria D. Miklowitz; co-starring Marcelino Sanchez.
Have You Tried Talking to Patty?	Wanting to be accepted by her peers, a hearing-impaired teenager attempts to change her image. Co-starring Khrystyne Haje, Dedee Pfeiffer, Mark Patton, Heather Langenkamp and Joseph Mascolo.
Babies Having Babies	Five pregnant teenage girls meet in the same group-counseling session. They discuss their varied feelings about their common situation. Directed by Martin Sheen, whose real-life daughter Renee Estevez portrays one of the young moms-to-be. Also starring Eileen Ryan, Jill Whelan, Claudia Wells and Lori Loughlin.
God, the Universe & Hot Fudge Sundaes	A teenage girl questions her religion after her sister is diagnosed with a terminal illness.

==== Season 4 (September 10, 1986 – June 21, 1987) ====
Episode	Synopsis
The Drug Knot	Dermot Mulroney portrays a high school student who seems hopelessly addicted to drugs, until he is slapped with the most horrifying wake-up call imaginable. All the while, drug counselor and motivational speaker David Toma lectures teens and parents about the dangers of teen drug and alcohol use, and about alternative ways to cope. David Faustino co-stars as Mulroney's younger brother; Tracy Nelson plays Dermot's girlfriend. Also starring Rance Howard, David Toma as himself, and directed by Anson Williams.
Little Miss Perfect	Not to be confused with the junior beauty pageant-reality show of the same title. Debbie Welker is upset over being forced into a new neighborhood and a new high school. Having a (seemingly) flawless, and oblivious (at first), single mother does not help at all. To cope with her problems, Debbie takes up binging and purging, which leads to an even greater problem, and to a long-overdue revelation from her mom. Co-starring April Lerman and Lisa Wilcox; directed by actress Marsha Mason; co-written by actress Judy Strangis.
My Dissident Mom	Spouses' conflicting opinions on nuclear weapons policy jeopardize not only the husband (Martin Sheen)'s impending business deal, but their relationships with each other and their kids. Co-starring Lukas Haas and Amy Green.
The Day They Came to Arrest the Book	Uncomfortable with racist language in "The Adventures of Huckleberry Finn", a high school student and his parents attempt to get the book removed from the school's library. Starring Jonathan Crombie. Special appearance by Anne Meara. Script written by Melvin Van Peebles, based on a book by Nat Hentoff.
What If I'm Gay?	The popular and macho captain of his high school soccer team is forced to confront his homosexuality, after his buddies discover a male pornography magazine in his bedroom. Co-starring Gabrielle Carteris.
Juvi	Teenager Susan Atherton (Traci Lind) is wrongfully accused of theft by her stepfather, who has her arrested and placed in juvenile hall. Co-starring Khrystyne Haje. Written and directed by actress Joanna Lee.
An Enemy Among Us	A teenager is stunned to discover that he has contracted the AIDS virus after having a blood transfusion.

==== Season 5 (October 20, 1987 – April 19, 1988) ====
Episode	Synopsis
Soldier Boys	Detective Robb (James Earl Jones) investigates a club for teenage boys who take their "war game" fantasies into the real world.
Never Say Goodbye	After her grandmother is pronounced brain dead following a stroke, a teenage girl must make the painful decision whether to continue life support.
Home Sweet Homeless	After a series of bad luck, a single mother and her sons become homeless and are forced to live in their car. Co-starring Michael Faustino and Alfonso Ribeiro.
Gangs	On leave from the army, a 19-year-old returns home to find that his kid brother is the leader of a gang — a gang that he once led himself.

==== Season 6 (October 18, 1988 – April 11, 1989) ====
Episode	Synopsis
No Means No	When Megan Wells (Dana Barron) becomes a date-rape victim, she and her brother Michael (Chad Lowe) must deal with the fallout, which has lasting effects on their relationship with each other, and with the opposite sex in general. Co-starring Tracy Wells and Lori Loughlin.
Gambler	A 17-year-old becomes addicted to gambling, which soon takes over his life. Not to be confused with the James Caan movie of the same title, despite similar subject matter. Co-starring George Dzundza.
Words to Live By	Two teenage boys are suspended from school after distributing an underground newspaper on campus. Starring Ricky Paull Goldin.
My Past Is My Own	Two black teenagers are sent through time to experience how blacks were treated during the civil rights movement. Co-starring CCH Pounder.
15 and Getting Straight	A look at a drug addiction treatment center for teenagers (including real-life victims Drew Barrymore and Corey Feldman), where the counselors are ex-addicts themselves.
A Matter of Conscience	A teenager is stunned when his grandfather's Nazi past becomes known to his family. Co-starring Eli Wallach.

==== Season 7 (October 17, 1989 – April 24, 1990) ====
Episode	Synopsis
Frog Girl: The Jenifer Graham Story	A 15-year-old school girl refuses to dissect a frog and sues her school district for not allowing her to do an alternative project.
Flour Babies	A group of high school students take part in a parenting class where their assignment is to treat a sack of flour like a newborn baby. Co-starring Ian Ziering.
The Girl with the Crazy Brother	A teenage girl (Patricia Arquette) struggles to cope when her brother is diagnosed with schizophrenia. Co-starring Alex Desert; Belinda Carlisle contributes several songs from her album Runaway Horses.
American Eyes	A Korean boy, who has been adopted by an American family, decides to attend a Korean-American summer camp to learn more about his heritage.
Maggie's Secret	15-year-old Maggie Kingston must decide how to resolve not one but two drinking problems: that of her father (Joseph Bottoms); and that of her mother (Mimi Kuzyk).
Malcolm Takes a Shot	Teenage athlete Malcolm Jones is in denial about his epilepsy, as he strives for super-stardom on the basketball court. Directed by Mario Van Peebles, who also makes a cameo as Malcolm's doctor.

==== Season 8 (October 16, 1990 – April 2, 1991) ====
Episode	Synopsis
The Fourth Man	Not to be confused with the Paul Verhoeven film of the same title. Seeking the respect of his star athlete-father John (Tim Rossovich), teenage computer-wiz Joey Martelli (Peter Billingsley) uses steroids to make his high school track and field team...and to win cheerleader-captain Heidi (Nicole Eggert) as his girlfriend. But soon those "roids" take their toll, both on Joey's social life and on his scholastic status...and, ultimately, on his body as well. Co-starring Adrienne Barbeau (as Joey's mom Mary), Ken Medlock (as Coach Gerry James), Vince Vaughn (as Joey's best friend Steve), and Lyle Alzado (as Hugo "Bear" Volkovich); with Michael Cedar (as roid-dealing sporting goods-clerk Frank Malone), Laurence Haddon (as Principal Williams), and Dan Blom (as the Pusher at Vito's Gym). Co-scripted, executive produced, and directed by Joanna Lee; with a music score by TV host John Tesh.
Lies of the Heart	Following a hit-and-run, wealthy high school seniors Jordan Crane (Christopher Rydell) and his best friend Kyle (Christopher Collet) are forced to deal with the consequences of their actions. It does not get any easier when Jordan, who was driving, falls in love with his victim's financially struggling daughter, who has no idea (at first) that he is responsible. Also starring Tricia O'Neil as Jordan's mother; with Brooke Theiss and Vince Vaughn.
The Emancipation of Lizzie Stern	After a woman announces plans to move their family to another state, her 16-year-old daughter (Tammy Lauren) – the title character – seeks legal emancipation so she will not have to leave the school and friends she has had for so many years. Ultimately, Lizzie gets what she fought for, but wins much more than she counted on.
But He Loves Me	When teenager Cassie O'Brian (Kelli Williams) hits it off with Charlie Tyler (Donovan Leitch), the most popular boy in her school, everything is wonderful, until he becomes violent toward her. Both take turns narrating this story. Co-starring Season Hubley and Robin Tunney.
Abby, My Love	Teenager Chip Fulton (Josh Hamilton) is determined to help his new girlfriend Abby Morris (Cara Buono) when he learns she is being sexually abused at home. Anthony Heald and Veronica Cartwright portray Abby's parents.

==== Season 9 (October 22, 1991 – April 7, 1992) ====
Episode	Synopsis
Dedicated to the One I Love	Teenage Amy Miller (Lisa Dean Ryan) is stunned to discover what killed her beloved boyfriend: AIDS. With Joely Fisher.
Two Teens and a Baby	Two teenage brothers (one of them portrayed by Brice Beckham) are stunned when their mother announces that she is expecting a daughter. Co-starring Robert Picardo (as the boys' dad) and Maureen Flannigan.
50 Simple Things Kids Can Do to Save the Earth	Special featuring 50 things young people can do to save the earth.
Please, God, I'm Only Seventeen	Young Michael Leland is critically injured in an automobile accident, which teaches both his sister (Roxana Zal) and his best friend Steve (Stan Kirsch) never to take life for granted. Co-starring Randolph Mantooth and Talia Shire as Michael's parents.
Different Worlds: A Story of Interracial Love	Two teens from racially different background begin a relationship after witnessing the murder of a mutual friend.

==== Season 10 (October 20, 1992 – April 13, 1993) ====
Episode	Synopsis
Sexual Considerations	Teenager Jen (Heather McAdam) blows the whistle on sexual harassment by a classmate, so a student court is hand-picked to straighten things out. Co-starring Bernie Casey, Tito Ortiz and Hudson Leick.
Words Up!	An illiterate 25-year-old (Kadeem Hardison) returns to high school, posing as a teenager so he can learn to read. Co-starring Richard Moll, David Faustino and Vanna White (as herself).
Love Off Limits	Two youngsters cry censorship when their school demands that they edit out "inappropriate" portions of their student film. Co-starring Steve Guttenberg (who also directed) and John Savage.
Big Boys Don't Cry	High school wrestler Tony suspects, accurately, that his younger brother is being molested by their uncle Paul (Robert Pine). For Tony, this causes painful memories of his own sexual abuse as a child by Paul...which all but destroys Tony's life, when his parents refuse to believe him and his wrestling coach does not care. Co-starring Mario Lopez as a fellow wrestler (and the only person who's sympathetic to Tony's plight).
Crosses on the Lawn	A community begins to take sides when an affirmative action program is introduced.

==== Season 11 (October 12, 1993 – April 12, 1994) ====
Episode	Synopsis
Other Mothers	Justin Whalin portrays a teenage basketball player who has been raised by a lesbian couple. Now he must contend with the conservative views of his new high school. Co-starring Joanna Cassidy, Meredith Baxter and Judith Ivey.
If I Die Before I Wake	High school students must ultimately pick up the pieces when their entire track and field team is killed in an airplane crash. Co-starring Gavin MacLeod, Tammy Lauren and Tito Ortiz.
Love in the Dark Ages	Teenage girl is stunned to discover that her boyfriend has given her an STD.
Same Difference	Two teens from different cultural backgrounds face opposition from their parents when they begin to date. Co-starring Skeet Ulrich.

==== Season 12 (October 11, 1994 – May 30, 1995) ====
Episode	Synopsis
The Writing on the Wall	Three teens (one portrayed by Peter Billingsley) are arrested for defacing a Jewish temple. The indomitable rabbi (Hal Linden) – who prides himself on never writing anybody off, and on never blowing his cool (except, he admits, when the Mets lose) – persuades the judge (Steven Gilborn) to give the boys 25 hours of Holocaust/Judaism "Tolerance" education, which the rabbi himself will teach. Based on a true story.
My Summer as a Girl	Desperate for a summer job, a teenage boy (Zach Braff) masquerades as a girl to land a chambermaid job at a swanky hotel.
What About Your Friends	A unique look at the senior year successes, and failures, of three high school girlfriends (Monica Calhoun, Lark Voorhies, and Malinda Williams) as they prepare for college. Directed by Gina Prince-Bythewood, who was nominated for two Daytime Emmy Awards, Outstanding Directing for a Children's Series and Outstanding Writing in a Children's Special. Winner of Outstanding Animated/Live-Action/Dramatic Youth or Children's Series/Special at the 27th Annual NAACP Image Awards. Followed in 2002 by What About Your Friends: Weekend Getaway, a direct feature-length sequel with a different creative team and a brand new cast playing the same characters.
Kids Killing Kids	Malcolm-Jamal Warner hosts this program, which depicts four separate stories showing the tragic consequences when teens use guns to solve their problems, and how they can solve the same problem without guns. Originally aired jointly as a prime time special by CBS and Fox in May 1994.
Between Mother and Daughter	Anna Leone (Lindsay Crouse) is dying of breast cancer. Her husband Joe (Dan Lauria) has trouble dealing with this, as do their teenage offspring Scott (Christopher Daniel Barnes) and especially, Carla (A.J. Langer).
Stand Up	A teenager wants to be a stand-up comic and go on tour, despite her father's opposition.

==== Season 13 (October 24, 1995 – January 23, 1996) ====
Episode	Synopsis
My Indian Summer	Native American teenager decides to learn more about her culture by spending the summer on the Indian Reservation where her mother was born.
Children Remember the Holocaust	Keanu Reeves hosts this special where celebrities narrate letters, diaries, and published stories of children who have lived through the Holocaust.
Crosstown	When her parents split up, a teenage girl must move out of the suburbs and into the big city. Co-starring Roscoe Lee Browne.
