= The Drug Knot =

- Genre: Drama; Family; Romance
- Written by: David Villaire
- Directed by: Anson Williams
- Starring: Dermot Mulroney; David Toma; David Faustino; Tracy Nelson; Kim Myers
- Theme music composer: Robert De La Garza
- Country of origin: United States
- Original language: English

Production
- Producer: Arnold Shapiro
- Production locations: Marshall Fundamental Secondary School - 990 Allen Avenue, Pasadena, California
- Cinematography: Stephen L. Posey
- Editor: Craig Ridenour
- Running time: 96 minutes
- Production companies: CBS Schoolbreak Special Telefilm; CBS

Original release
- Network: CBS
- Release: September 10, 1986

The Drug Knot is a 1986 CBS Schoolbreak Special, a cautionary tale about teenage drug dependency.

== Plot ==
High-school student Doug Dawson has it all: a loving family (composed of his younger brother and their parents), a terrific girlfriend, a rock band he plays in after school...and a drug habit. He began by smoking marijuana but is now seeking more dangerous highs. The latter costs him everything else, as his behavior becomes increasingly erratic and alienation – some of it mutual – sets in. Doug wanders into an anti-drug lecture by David Toma, playing himself, but Doug is eventually ejected for disruptive behavior. In his bedroom, Doug snorts a line of cocaine, unaware his younger brother is watching from the doorway.

Doug's girlfriend tires of his volatile behavior and she convinces Doug's mother to meet with the charismatic Toma to get help for Doug. Initially in denial, Mrs. Dawson agrees to seek help for her son. However, unlike most young people's specials, The Drug Knot has a completely downbeat ending. Doug's adoring younger brother Louie finds his brother's drug supply and snorts a line himself. Doug arrives home to find Louie floating face down in the family swimming pool. As Doug frantically jumps into the pool to rescue Louie, a voiceover of Toma asks: "You kids are killing yourselves...for what?"

== Cast ==
- Dermot Mulroney as Doug Dawson
- David Toma as Himself
- Mary Ellen Trainor as Helen Dawson
- Lawrence Pressman as Jack Dawson
- David Faustino as Louie Dawson
- Rance Howard as Mr. Sellers
- Nick Angotti as Coach
- Tracy Nelson as Lori
- Kim Myers as Kim
- Annie Oringer as Annie
- Duane Boutte as Leon
- Barbara Stamm as Mary Parks
