= Anthony Wall (filmmaker) =

British documentary filmmaker (born 1951)

- Born: 1951 (age 74–75); Hackney, London, England
- Education: King's College, Cambridge
- Occupation: Filmmaker
- Notable credit: Arena

Anthony Wall (born 1951) is a British documentary filmmaker whose lifelong contribution to cinema has been honoured with the Special Medallion of the Telluride film festival. He was the longest-serving Series Editor of the BBC's flagship arts documentary strand Arena, voted by leading TV executives in Broadcast magazine as one of the top 50 most influential programmes of all time.

== Early life ==
Anthony Wall was born in Hackney, East London, in 1951, and grew up in Herne Hill. He attended a Catholic grammar school before studying English at King's College, Cambridge.

In 1974, he joined BBC Radio as a trainee studio manager. That same year, he joined the Morning Star as its first rock critic.

Wall moved across to television production in 1978, working in the Music and Arts (Television) department of the BBC under its head Humphrey Burton.

== Arena ==
He joined the Arena production office in late 1978, when Alan Yentob was in charge of its Theatre and Art & Design strands. This was soon consolidated into a series of single films, moving away from the magazine format. Wall was instrumental in this shift, forming the core team with directors Nigel Finch and Nigel Williams, together developing a more discursive and playful approach to art documentary. With Finch as director, Wall co-devised the landmark films My Way, Chelsea Hotel and The Private Life of the Ford Cortina.

As an emerging director on the series, Wall profiled Luck and Flaw, John Peel, Desert Island Discs, The Everly Brothers, Superman, Mikey Smith, Luis Buñuel and Jerry Lee Lewis.

In 1985, Wall was appointed joint series editor alongside Finch, replacing Yentob, who had been promoted to Head of Music and Arts. Together they pioneered the themed evening, beginning with Blues Night (1985), followed by Caribbean Nights (1986), Animal Night (1989), Food Night (1990) and the immersive Wall-directed Texas Saturday Night (1991). With Radio Night (1993) they took over both BBC Two and BBC Radio 4 for a unique simulcast.

A sister series, Rhythms of the World (1988–93), was added to Finch and Wall's roster, reflecting the abundance of extra material shot for Arena's world music films. It was also a strand for original work, with many of its 69 films being new commissions.

When Finch died in 1995, Wall continued as series editor for a further 23 years. In place of a weekly slot, Arena had now entered a new era of occasional "specials" in the schedules, and would grow to enjoy a major presence on the international documentary stage. High-profile collaborations with Martin Scorsese, Clint Eastwood and Bob Dylan were broadcast in this period.

Since 2015, Wall has developed Night and Day, also known as The Arena Time Machine, an ongoing art project with film editor/director Emma Matthews. It is a series of films made entirely from the Arena archive that simply present the day and night as they proceed, each one in exact synchronicity with the date and time of the screening. They vary in length from eight to 24 hours, and have appeared in Cambridge, Brighton, New York, San Francisco, Telluride, Ireland, Sheffield and London.

Wall stepped down as series editor in 2018. He was succeeded by Mark Bell as commissioning editor.

== Awards ==
Wall has personally been awarded three BAFTA awards, three Royal Television Society awards, an Emmy, the Prix Italia, and the Special Medallion of the Telluride Film Festival. He also accepted the Mel Novikoff Award at the San Francisco International Film Festival 2019 on behalf of Arena.

== Selected filmography ==
Year	Films
1979	My Way (researcher)
1980	Climb Every Mountain, or Nothing Succeeds Like Failure (researcher); Luck And Flaw (director)
1981	Chelsea Hotel (researcher); Hazel Meets His Makers (researcher); Today Carshalton Beeches, Tomorrow Croydon (director); The Comic Strip Hero (director); Brixton to Barbados (director)
1982	The Private Life of the Ford Cortina (associate producer); Desert Island Discs (director); Upon Westminster Bridge (director)
1983	Jazz Juke Box (producer); Jazz Juke Box II (director); The Everly Brothers Reunion Concert (associate producer)
1984	The Life And Times of Don Luis Buñuel (director); Jerry Lee Lewis (director); The Everly Brothers – Songs of Innocence And Experience (director); Music of the Other Americas (co-director)
1986	Maytime on the Mosquito Coast (director); Scarfe on Scarfe (co-director)
1987	How Do You Solve a Problem Like Maria? (director)
1988	My Name is Celia Cruz (director)
1989	Slim Gaillard's Civilisation (four episodes, director)
1991	Tudo da Samba - Everything That Makes for a Samba (director); One Irish Rover (director); Slim's Jazz (director); Texas Saturday Night (director)
1992	Rhythms of the World in Texas (four episodes, director)
1993	Jorge Ben in Performance (director)
1998	Jerry Jeff Walker – Let's Go to Luckenbach, Texas (director)
1998	The Brian Epstein Story (two episodes, director)
1999	Looking for the Iron Curtain (director)
2001	Sykes and A Day (director)
2002	Pinter at the BBC (director of 5 live recordings)
2003	Dylan Thomas – Grave To Cradle (director)
2005	Dennis Potter – It's in the Songs! It's in the Songs! (director); Dennis Potter – Potter on TV (director); Dylan in the Madhouse (director)
2007	Bob Marley - Exodus '77 (director); Dylan’s Folk - The Pure, The Bad and the Ugly (director)
2009	Cool (director)
2010	Harold Pinter – A Celebration (co-director); Johnny Mercer – The Dream's On Me (co-director)
2012	Dickens on Film (director)
2014	Whatever Happened to Spitting Image (director); Roger Law – Carved, Drawn and Quartered (director); Peter Fluck – Stillness to Movement (director); John Lloyd – The Meaning Of (director)
2015–present	Night and Day (co-director)
2016	The Roundhouse – The People's Palace (director)
