= Unwed Mother =

Unwed Mother may refer to:

- Unwed mother
- Unwed Mother (novel), a 1977 novel by Gloria D. Miklowitz
- Unwed Mother (film), a 1958 American drama film
