= Stonewall (1995 film) =

1995 film by Nigel Finch

- Theatrical release poster
- Directed by: Nigel Finch
- Screenplay by: Rikki Beadle-Blair
- Based on: Stonewall by Martin Duberman
- Produced by: Christine Vachon
- Starring: Guillermo Díaz; Frederick Weller; Duane Boutte; Bruce MacVittie; Brendan Corbalis
- Cinematography: Chris Seager
- Edited by: John Richards
- Music by: Michael Kamen
- Production companies: BBC; BBC Arena; Killer Films
- Distributed by: 2\Entertain (UK); Strand Releasing (US)
- Release dates: September 2, 1995 (Italy); May 10, 1996 (United Kingdom); September 3, 1996 (United States)
- Running time: 99 minutes
- Countries: United Kingdom; United States
- Language: English
- Box office: $692,400

Stonewall is a 1995 British-American historical comedy-drama film directed by Nigel Finch, his final film before his AIDS-related death shortly after filming ended. Inspired by the memoir of the same title by gay historian Martin Duberman, Stonewall is a fictionalized account of the weeks leading up to the Stonewall riots, a seminal event in the modern American gay rights movement. The film stars Guillermo Díaz, Frederick Weller, Brendan Corbalis, and Duane Boutte.

While the film is a work of fiction, Finch makes the unusual directorial choice of including documentary-style interview footage with several people who were at the Stonewall Inn during the uprising. Finch also intersperses lip synch numbers performed by the actors throughout the film to function as something of a Greek chorus.

== Plot ==
Matty Dean, a young gay man, arrives in New York City and heads for Greenwich Village. He falls in with crossdressing sex worker La Miranda and friends, who take him to Stonewall Inn. There is a police raid and Matty and La Miranda are arrested. They are bailed out by Bostonia, the African-American "mother" of the queens who hang out at Stonewall, and the secret lover of Vinnie, the deeply closeted mafioso who runs Stonewall. Matty and La Miranda go back to her place where she receives her draft notice. Matty attends a meeting of the Mattachine Society, where he meets Burt and Ethan. The group is planning a picket at Independence Hall in Philadelphia. Matty later witnesses an initiation ritual of sorts as a young man named José becomes the persona Camelia. After the ceremony they return to La Miranda's place and have sex.

Matty spends time with Ethan, who is a writer under a pseudonym for a homophile magazine. La Miranda reports to the induction center in full drag and is ordered to go for psychological evaluation. La Miranda is terrified because of former bad experiences with psychiatrists, so Matty dons her clothes and meets with the doctor in her place, securing a rejection from military service for her as a "sexual deviant." On the subway ride home, La Miranda tells Matty that she’s never had a hero before and asks if he loves her, to which he replies that it’s his turn to be scared.

At a Mattachine meeting, Matty is disgusted by the guest speaker, a psychiatrist who discourses on the then-current disease model of homosexuality, and leaves. After the meeting Burt, Ethan and Matty argue about it on their way to meet with a reporter and photographer from the Village Voice newspaper. The group stages a "sip-in," trying to illustrate discriminatory alcohol service laws by being refused service but no one refuses to serve them until they go to Stonewall. At the bar La Miranda and Ethan meet and Ethan treats her mockingly. La Miranda realizes that Matty hasn't told his Mattachine friends about her and storms out. Matty follows and they argue about La Miranda's refusal to conform and Matty's feeling the need to be with more masculine men. Matty seeks out Ethan and they begin an affair.

Vinnie points out a clinic he calls the "Palace of Dreams" and tells Bostonia that he wants her to have sex reassignment surgery so that they can marry, but she is opposed to the idea.

Following the Philadelphia picket, Ethan takes Matty to Fire Island. Given the choice between Ethan's acceptance of discrimination and La Miranda's defiance, Matty chooses La Miranda and they reconcile.

It is the day of Judy Garland's death. Bostonia watches the television coverage. To cheer her up, Vinnie takes her out in full drag in public for the first time. They have ice cream at a fancy restaurant, their open affection drawing disapproving stares, and they are asked to leave by the manager.

As they wake up together the next morning, Vinnie asks Bostonia if he's ever told her that he loves her. She says no. Vinnie suddenly commits suicide with a bullet through the head and Bostonia becomes hysterical. Vinnie has left her a large amount of cash and scrawled "I LOVE YOU" on a mirror in lipstick.

That night at Stonewall there's another raid. Several of the queens are arrested, including Bostonia. She smashes a police officer in the face and is attacked by other cops. Then other queens fight back, touching off the riots that marked the beginning of the gay community's militant advocacy movement for its rights.

== Cast ==
- Guillermo Díaz as La Miranda
- Frederick Weller as Matty Dean
- Brendan Corbalis as Ethan
- Duane Boutte as Bostonia
- Bruce MacVittie as Vinnie
- Peter Ratray as Burt
- Dwight Ewell as Helen Wheels
- Matthew Faber as Mizz Moxie
- Michael McElroy as Princess Ernestine
- Luis Guzmán as Vito
- Joey Dedio as Angelo

== Factual inaccuracies ==
Although the film is based on true events, there are some factual inaccuracies. These include:

- The sip-in did not include the Stonewall Inn as a stop. Service was refused at a bar called Julius. This action took place in 1966, not 1969.
- The picket in Philadelphia, known as the Annual Reminder, took place each July 4 from 1965 to 1969, later in the summer than depicted in the film.
- Many of those in attendance at the riots deny categorically that Judy Garland's death was a motivating factor.

== Soundtrack ==
Stonewall: Music from the Motion Picture

Soundtrack album
- Released: 1996
- Genre: Pop

1. The Shangri-Las – "Give Him a Great Big Kiss"
2. The Butterflies – "Gee Baby Gee"
3. The Shangri-Las – "Sophisticated Boom"
4. The Shirelles – "Ooh Poo Pah Doo"
5. The Shangri-Las – "Remember (Walkin' in the Sand)"
6. The Ad Libs – "Boy from New York City"
7. Judy Garland – "Zing! Went the Strings of My Heart"
8. Patti LaBelle and the Bluebelles – "Down the Aisle"
9. Bessie Banks – "Go Now"
10. Judy Garland – "Over the Rainbow"
11. Barenaked Ladies – "What a Good Boy"
12. The Shangri-Las – "Give Him a Great Big Kiss" (Hani's Kiss Mix)

== Release ==
=== Box office ===
Stonewall opened theatrically on September 3, 1996, its widest release being 10 venues. Closing on December 12, 1996, it grossed $692,400.

=== Critical reception ===
The film received positive reviews from critics. On Rotten Tomatoes, the film has a 67% score based on 9 reviews.

=== Accolades ===
- 1995 London Film Festival - Audience Award
- 1996 San Francisco International Lesbian & Gay Film Festival - Audience Award for Best Feature
- 1996 Outfest - Grand Jury Award Honorable Mention - Outstanding Screenwriting - Rikki Beadle-Blair

=== Home media ===
Stonewall was released on VHS tape in the 1996 by Tartan Video. This video was a Virgin exclusive and is out of print. A VHS release also happened in Australia (dendy).

Stonewall was released on Region 1 DVD on October 26, 1999 and again by the BBC in 2008, in NTSC (not widescreen). It received a German DVD release (region 2) in 2004.

A laserdisc was released in the US in 1996.

The film is difficult to find due to the low numbers of DVD sales in the 1990s. However, as of July 25, 2021, it was available on Amazon Prime in the US, but in other countries, it is unavailable. In the UK, the film is available on BBC iPlayer.

== Stage play ==
The film was adapted for the stage by screenwriter Beadle-Blair. It premiered in London and The Edinburgh Festival in 2007.

== Sources ==
- Eisenbach, David (2006). Gay Power: An American Revolution. Carroll & Graf Publishers. ISBN 0-7867-1633-9.
- Loughery, John (1998). The Other Side of Silence – Men's Lives and Gay Identities: A Twentieth-Century History. New York, Henry Holt and Company. ISBN 0-8050-3896-5.
- Marks Ridinger, Robert B. (2004). Speaking For Our Lives: Historic Speeches and Rhetoric for Gay and Lesbian Rights (1892-2000). Haworth Press. ISBN 1-56023-175-0.
- Remembering Stonewall (1988) Sound Portraits Productions, Inc.
