= Frederick Baker =

Austrian-British filmmaker (1965–2020)

- Born: Frederick Douglas Stephan Baker; 26 January 1965; Salzburg, Austria
- Died: 24 August 2020 (aged 55); Vienna, Austria
- Citizenship: British, Austrian
- Spouse: Sandra Fasolt Baker

Frederick Douglas Stephan "Fred" Baker (26 January 1965 – 24 August 2020) was an Austrian-British filmmaker, media scholar, and archaeologist.

He was born in Salzburg and was brought up in London. After graduating from Queen Elizabeth's Grammar School for Boys, he studied Anthropology and Archaeology at St John’s College, Cambridge, Tübingen and Sheffield Universities, finishing with a Ph.D. from Cambridge University.

He was a Senior Research Associate at the McDonald Institute for Archaeological Research, Cambridge University, specialising in Digital Humanities, Heritage, and Prehistoric Rock Art. He was a co-founder of the EU-funded 3D Pitoti digital heritage project and co-director of the Cambridge University Prehistoric Picture Project.

He divided his time between London, Berlin and Vienna, producing and directing films, as well as writing articles and books. In the book The Art of Projectionism (2007) he defined a projectionist school of filmmaking and media art. In this publication he also presented "ambient film", a surround experience that can be shown in specially developed "ambient cinemas". His first narrative ambient short, Ruhetag, was premiered in Vienna in 2007. Ring Road: A Viennese Odyssey, the first ambient feature film, was premiered at the Biennale in Seville in 2008.

His interview partners included Yoko Ono, George H. W. Bush, Mikhail Gorbachev, Václav Havel, Shimon Peres, Helmut Kohl, John Major, Michel Rocard, Tadeusz Mazowiecki, Amalia Rodrigues, Cardinal Franz König, Lord Norman Foster, Sir Ernst Gombrich, Simon Wiesenthal, Prince Louis Ferdinand of Prussia, Joseph Stalin’s grandson and Vivienne Westwood.

Baker taught film at the Donau University, Krems and St. Pölten University of Applied Sciences in Austria. He lectured on film, media and journalism at the Bauhaus University, Weimar, the Universität der Künste in Berlin and Middlesex University in London. He also taught film as part of the Screen Media and Culture Group at Cambridge University. His specialties included cinema of Austria, new media art and television documentary. For the Museum of Applied Arts, Vienna he created 'Klimt's Magic Garden: A Virtual Reality Experience by Frederick Baker' (2018).

Baker died on 25 August 2020, at the age of 55.

== Filmography ==
- Goodbye to Berlin's Big Brother (BBC Late Show) (1994)
- Correspondent - 12 reports from Central Europe (BBC Current Affairs) (1995-2000)
- Killing Time - the 48 hour week (BBC Assignment) (1995)
- Right to Reply - Bloody Bosnia (Channel 4) (1995)
- Stories My Country Told Me: The Meaning of Nationhood - Eric Hobsbawn and Slovakian Nationalism (for BBC Arena) (1996)
- Austrian-Jewish Cultural Festival (ORF Culture) (1996)
- Shopping for King Arthur (ORF Culture) (1996)
- Women Priests in England (ORF) (1996)
- The First Silent Night (BBC Music) (1997)
- Die erste Stille Nacht (Media Europa/ORF) (1997)
- Re-cycling Churches in England (ORF Religion) (1997)
- Fado: Religion und Music in Portugal (ORF Religion) (1997)
- The German Giant - Helmut Kohl (BBC Correspondent Special) (1998)
- Viennese Jews on the Thames (Austrian Cultural Institute, London) (1998)
- Big Brother - The Stasi - East Germany's Secret Police (BBC Correspondent Special) (1999)
- Magic Lantern: Václav Havel & Revolution (BBC Correspondent Special) (1999)
- Stille Nacht - Ein Lied geht um die Welt (Media Europa/ORF) (1999)
- Stalin- der Rote Gott (ORF/ Rainer Moritz Arts) (1999)
- Rebuilding the Reichstag (BBC Omnibus) (1999)
- The Haider Show (BBC Correspondent) (2000)
- Stalin: Red God (BBC Arena) (2000)
- The Kabbala Oratorio (ORF - Bayern Alpha) (2002)
- Deutschland Deutschland: Sigmund Nissels musikalische Reise (ORF/3SAT) (2002)
- Imagine IMAGINE (BBC Arena/ORF) (2003)
- Creme Bavaroise: obazt is Gerhard Polt & die Biermöslblosn (Media Europa) (2003)
- Shadowing the Third Man (with Silverapples Media for BBC/ORF) (2004)
- Anziehendes Österreich - Modische Inszenierungen von Kopf bis Fuss (With Sandra Fasolt) (2005)
- Testing Mozart (BBC/ ORF/ Arte/ Euroarts) (2006)
- Romy Schneider- Eine Frau in drei Noten (ORF/ARTE) (2008)
- Kultur des Widerstands (ORF/ Filmbäckerei) (2010)
- Widerstand in Haiderland (Filmbäckerei/Polyfilm) (2010)
- Und Äktschn (2014)
- Und Äktschn: Making of (TV movie documentary) (2014)
- Prometheus Pitoti (short film) (2016)
- Cinema Austria: Die ersten 112 Jahre (TV movie documentary) (2020)

== Awards ==
- Golden Halo, Best Virtual Reality Documentary, Amsterdam European VR days

VR Days Amsterdam, September 2017 Award for 360 VR film "Pitoti Prometheus" with Marcel Karnapke, Produced at Cambridge University and the Bauhaus University Weimar for the EU project 3D Pitoti.

- Best 3D Animation

World 3D Guild, Liege, Belgium December 2016 Award for "Pitoti Prometheus" 360 VR film with Marcel Karnapke. Produced with McDonald Institute for Archaeological Research, Cambridge University & Bauhaus University Weimar, as part of the EU Project "3D Pitoti".

- Europa Nostra European Union Digital Research Prize 2016

Europa Nostra & European Union

- 2008: Homosexuell und dennoch Christ (ORF, Kreuz & Quer): Leopold Ungar Preis. Fredrick Baker wurde gemeinsam mit Sandra Fasolt für den Beitrag "Homosexuell und dennoch Christ" (ORF, Kreuz & Quer) mit dem Anerkennungspreis in der Kategorie TV ausgezeichnet. Der Bericht kratze massiv an Vorurteilen und stelle festgefahrene Haltungen der Kirche in Frage, so die Begründung der Jury -> Caritas Wien
- 2007: Shadowing the Third Man: Finalist, Hollywood Film Festival and Belgrade International Film Festival; Finalist, URTI International Film Festival, Monte Carlo.
- 2006: Shadowing the Third Man won 1st Overall Prize for best documentary at the Festival di Palazzo Venezia_Arte 2006 in Rome.
- 2005: Shadowing the Third Man was selected for the Cannes Film Festival. Imagine IMAGINE was awarded the World Gold Medal for feature documentaries in the category Film and Video at the New York Festivals 2005. Deutschland, Deutschland was awarded the Silver Remi at the Worldfest in the Houston International film festival.
- 2004: Stalin: Red God won a Bronze Remi at the Worldfest Houston - category History and Archaeology films. Imagine IMAGINE was awarded a Golden Prague award (Special Mention) in the documentary category at the 41st Golden Prague International Film Festival in the documentary category. Jury statement:"Through an iconic song, this film paints a colourful portrait of a global generation."
- 2003: Deutschland, Deutschland was selected as a finalist in the Hollywood Film Festival and showcased at the Arclight Theater on Sunset Boulevard. It also made the finals of the PRIX EUROPA in Berlin, as one of the top ten in Europe in the multi-cultural documentary category - "Iris". The film was shortlisted for the Golden Prague Music documentary award in Prague. It was selected for the Academia festival in Olomouc and the Hradec Kralovy in the Czech Republic, and for the Golden Chest award in Bulgaria.
- 2002: Rebuilding the Reichstag won the Architectural Education award at 26th Festival International du Film d'Art et Pedagogique (FIFAP) Paris. Stalin: Red God was awarded the Golden Gate Award in the category History film at the 45th San Francisco International Film festival 2002. It was also a Finalist at the Banff film festival, the New York TV festival 2002.
- 2001: Stalin: Red God was jointly awarded the prize for best documentary at the 36th International Academia film festival in Olomouc, Czech Republic. It made the finals of the UNESCO festival in Paris, Maremma Doc, in Italy, and DocumentArt festival in Germany, Mediawave in Hungary, Palic in Yugoslavia & Booz, Allen Hamilton Award, Diagonale, Graz, Austria.
- 2001: The Correspondent series 2000 (including The Haider Show, Dr. Gross and Lojze Wieser) was awarded the prize for best TV Programme by the Royal Television society in London.
- 2001: The Haider Show was nominated for the Diagonale Documentary Prize, Graz.
- 2000: Rebuilding the Reichstag: Grand Prix at Techfilm 2000 - the 38th International Arts and Technology Film Festival, Czech Republic.
- 1997: Stories My Country Told Me: The Meaning of Nationhood - Eric Hobsbawn and Slovakian Nationalism: “Gold Hugo” – the top award in the category Social/ Political Documentary, INTERCOM film festival, Chicago. Also selected for and shown at the Jewish Film Festival, Vienna 1998.

== Bibliography ==
- Die beschämte Republik. Österreich 10 jahre nach Schwarz-Blau (Ed. with Petra Herczeg), Czernin Verlag, Vienna, 2010.
- The Art of Projectionism, Czernin Verlag, Vienna, 2007
- Salzburg Erlesen (edited by Frederick Baker), Wieser Verlag, Klagenfurt, 2007
- The Reichstag Graffiti / Die Reichstag Graffiti (with Norman Foster and Deborah Lipstadt), Jovis Verlag, Berlin, 2003
- "The Red Army graffiti in the Reichstag, Berlin: politics of rock-art in a contemporary European urban landscape" in European Landscapes of Rock-Art, edited by George Nash and Christopher Chippindale, Routledge, London, 2002
- Der dritte Mann: Auf den Spuren eines Filmklassikers (with Brigitte Timmermann), Czernin Verlag, Vienna, 2002
- Wiener Wandertage: eine Dokumentation (edited by Frederick Baker & Elisabeth Boyer), Wieser Verlag, Klagenfurt, 2002
