= After the Bomb =

After the Bomb may refer to:

- After the Bomb (novel), a 1985 novel by Gloria D. Miklowitz
- After the Bomb (game), a 1986 role-playing game supplement and 2001 complete RPG published by Palladium Books
