= Good Company Players =

- Formation: 1973
- Type: Theatre group
- Purpose: Musical theatre, plays
- Location: Fresno, California, USA
- Artistic director: Dan Pessano
- Website: https://gcplayers.com/

Good Company Players (GCP) is an amateur theatre company in Fresno, California. They perform at two venues; Roger Rocka's Dinner Theater, which primarily stages musicals, and the 2nd Space Theatre, which primarily produces straight plays. Between the two theaters, GCP mounts 12 shows a year; it has produced over 450 productions since it was founded. Notable alumni include Audra McDonald, Heidi Blickenstaff and Chris Colfer.

== History ==
GCP organized as a company and dinner theatre in 1973. Its charter executive board consisted of Dan Pessano, Chris Moad, Cathy Glenn, Ron Harlan and Steven Pilibos.^{:322} The company's first production was Stephen Sondheim's A Funny Thing Happened on the Way to the Forum, which opened on June 26, 1973, at Fresno's Hilton Hotel. In 1976 they moved to the Veterans Memorial Auditorium, where they staged Carousel. This was followed by productions at the Del Webb Towne House from 1977 to 1978.

=== Roger Rocka's Dinner Theater ===
In 1978 the company moved into a permanent location in a vacant Sprouse-Reitz store in Fresno's Tower District on the corner of Olive Ave. and Wishon Ave. There they opened what was known as "Roger Rocka's Good Company Music Hall, Eating Establishment and Drinking Emporium" with a production of Gypsy. The name was eventually shortened to "Roger Rocka's Dinner Theater, the home of Good Company Players."

==== Junior Company ====
In 1978 Good Company Players established the Junior Company, a group of up to twenty young people (aged between eight and sixteen) who perform a short musical cabaret before the main performance. Junior Company alumna Audra McDonald recalls:

"... we kids would do cabarets before each [show], things like Irving Berlin songs. I was singing 'White Cliffs of Dover' at ten. Before I was out of my teens, I'd basically absorbed the Broadway songbook."

Unlike Good Company Players, which is a for-profit business, the Junior Company is "a separate nonprofit entity that works with the program to train children in the specifics of performing arts, including acting, singing, and dance."^{:46}

=== 2nd Space Theatre ===
On July 16, 1982, GCP opened 2nd Space Theatre at 928 E. Olive, a 150-seat black box theater "intended to allow GCP to mount less commercial comedies and dramas in a smaller setting."

== Legacy ==
George Radanovich, the Representative for California's 19th congressional district, paid tribute to GCP In 1997 on the floor of the United States House of Representatives. He referred to the theater as "Fresno's gateway to Broadway", and "the centerpiece in Fresno's Tower District". Additionally, he stated that it has "launched many of Fresno's residents into television, technical, and choreographic careers."^{:785} Former alumni of the company have acknowledged the role it played in the personal, professional and artistic formation.

It is best known internationally as the location where multiple Tony Award-winner Audra McDonald first started performing. McDonald has described performing at GCP as "an incredible education":

My entire theatrical foundation was built there. Everything I know about theater, I first learned there. I honed it, maybe, as the years went on, but it was all learned at the Good Company Players.

Other notable alumni include Heidi Blickenstaff, Duane Boutte, Chris Colfer, Todd Decker, Christopher Gorham, Sharon Leal, Katrina Elayne Steward, Sarah Uriarte Berry, Robert Westenberg, and Michael Willett.^{:785}
