= Brother to Brother (film) =

- Theatrical release poster
- Directed by: Rodney Evans
- Written by: Rodney Evans
- Produced by: Rodney Evans; Jim McKay; Isen Robbins; Aimee Schoof
- Starring: Anthony Mackie; Roger Robinson; Duane Boutte
- Cinematography: Harlan Bosmajian
- Edited by: Sabine Hoffmann
- Music by: Barney McAll; Marc Anthony Thompson; Dave Warrin
- Distributed by: Wolfe Releasing
- Release dates: January 17, 2004 (Sundance); November 5, 2004 (United States)
- Running time: 94 minutes
- Country: United States
- Language: English
- Box office: $80,906

Brother to Brother is a 2004 film written and directed by Rodney Evans. The film debuted at the 2004 Sundance Film Festival, where it was awarded with the Special Jury Prize for Dramatic Feature. It went on to play the gay and lesbian film festival circuit where it collected many top festival awards. Brother to Brother was given a limited theatrical release in November 2004.

== Plot ==
Black art student Perry lives in the college dormitory at Columbia University after his homophobic parents kick him out of home when they discover he is gay. He is romantically pursued by another student, but his prospective boyfriend, who is white, says something he considers racist, so he ends the relationship. At a social loose end, Perry befriends an elderly, impoverished man named Bruce, whom he discovers was an important figure in the Harlem Renaissance. Through recalling his friendships with other important Harlem Renaissance figures Langston Hughes, Aaron Douglas, Wallace Thurman, and Zora Neale Hurston, Bruce chronicles some of the challenges he faced as a young, Black gay writer in the 1920s. Perry discovers that the challenges of homophobia and racism he faces in the early 21st century closely parallel Bruce's.

== Cast ==
- Anthony Mackie as Perry Williams
- Roger Robinson as Bruce
  - Duane Boutte as Young Bruce (credited as Duane Boutté)
- Alex Burns as Jim
- Ryan Michelle Bathe as Classroom Girl #2
- Lawrence Gilliard Jr. as Marcus (credited as Larry Gilliard Jr.)
- Oni Faida Lampley as Evelyn
- James Martinez as Julio, Perry's Boyfriend in Flashbacks
- Daniel Sunjata as Langston Hughes
- Ray Ford as Wallace Thurman
- Lance Reddick as James Baldwin
- Chad L. Coleman as "El" (credited as Chad Coleman)
- Leith M. Burke as Aaron Douglas
- Aunjanue Ellis as Zora Neale Hurston
- Richard Bekins as Carl
- Bradley Cole as MacAllister, Book Publisher
- Lizan Mitchell as Protesting Woman
- Tom Wiggin as Mr. Lewis
- Michael Duvert as Attacker #2
- Tracie Thoms as Mom On Subway
- Curtis McClarin as Black Man on Subway (credited as Curtis L. McClarin)
- Michael Mosley as White Man #1 on Subway

== Production ==
The film was inspired by a 1991 anthology titled Brother to Brother: New Writing by Black Gay Men. The editing of the book was started by Joseph Beam and, when he died in 1988, finished by Essex Hemphill. Director Rodney Evans chose the title for his film. His screenplay for the film was the recipient of The Independent Feature Project's Gordon Parks Award for Screenwriting. He also received funding from The Jerome Foundation, the Rockefeller Foundation and ITVS for the production of the film.

In an interview after the film's release, Evans said: "I thought of the film as a cinematic corollary to that book, which looked at Black gay life from different perspectives. I thought the piece was about relationships between Black men; the relationships were not necessarily sexual and the men were not necessarily gay."

The film was shot in 16mm and later blown up to 35mm.

== Reception ==
The film received positive reviews from critics, who applauded its handling of themes of queer community and racial turmoil and fetishization. At NPR, Allison Keyes wrote that "the voices of gay activists were often silenced during the civil rights movement and, before that, the Harlem Renaissance" and "Brother to Brother examines this silence."

In a positive review, Ty Burr of The Boston Globe wrote, "The larger context -- of whether the African-American struggle can include black homosexuality as part of its rebellion and one of its voices without having a meltdown -- is put across with admirable finesse. It isn't merely nice that Perry can take strength from a survivor like Nugent. As this promising film insists, it's necessary."

Michael D. Klemm wrote in Cinema Queer that the film is "a revelation," "beautifully acted and directed" and "almost overflows with ideas".

On review aggregate site Rotten Tomatoes, Brother to Brother has an approval rating of 76% based on 45 critics' reviews. The site's critics consensus states: "Led by two fine lead performances, Brother to Brother is a moving and thought-provoking dramatization of the Harlem Renaissance."

== Awards and nominations ==
- Gotham Independent Film Award for Breakthrough Actor: Anthony Mackie - nominated; Gotham Independent Film Award for Breakthrough Director: Rodney Evans - nominated (2004)
- Miami Gay and Lesbian Film Festival Jury Award best Fiction Feature - winner (2004)
- New York Lesbian and Gay Film Festival Vanguard Award - winner (2004)
- Philadelphia International Gay and Lesbian Film Festival, Jury Award for Best Feature Film - winner (2004)
- Outfest Grand Jury Award, Outstanding Actor in a Feature Film: Roger Robinson - winner; Outstanding American Narrative Feature - winner (2004)
- San Francisco International Lesbian & Gay Film Festival Audience Award Best Feature - winner (2004)
- Sundance Film Festival Special Jury Prize, Dramatic - winner; Grand Jury Prize, Dramatic - nominated (2004)
- GLAAD Media Awards Outstanding Film Limited Release - nominated (2005)
- Glitter Awards Best Feature Indie Gay Film - winner (2005)
- Independent Spirit Awards Best Debut Performance: Anthony Mackie - nominated; Best Supporting Male: Roger Robinson - nominated; Best First Screenplay: Rodney Evans - nominated; Best First Feature - nominated (2005)

== Home media ==
Brother to Brother was released on Region 1 DVD on June 14, 2004.
