= Toma (TV series) =

Television series

- Genre: Crime; Drama
- Created by: Edward Hume
- Starring: Tony Musante
- Country of origin: United States
- Original language: English
- No. of seasons: 1
- No. of episodes: 22 (plus 1 TV movie)

Production
- Producer: Stephen J. Cannell
- Production locations: Universal City, California; Long Beach, California
- Running time: 48 minutes
- Production companies: Universal Television; Roy Huggins Public Arts Productions

Original release
- Network: ABC
- Release: March 21, 1973 – May 10, 1974

Related
- Baretta

Toma is an American crime drama television series that ran on ABC from March 21, 1973, to May 10, 1974. The series stars Tony Musante as the real-life detective Dave Toma, who was a master of disguise and undercover work. Susan Strasberg and Simon Oakland play his wife and his boss, respectively.

== Overview ==
The series stars Tony Musante and Susan Strasberg and was based on the real-life story and published biography of Newark, New Jersey police detective David Toma, who had compiled an amazing arrest record during his years on the force, particularly in arresting drug dealers. His boss, Inspector Spooner, was played by Simon Oakland. The actual David Toma played bit parts in the series.

The show ended production after one season, as Musante had only agreed to film one full season, citing a desire not to get trapped into only playing one character over a long period of time. The network and producers had initially assumed this to be a negotiating ploy, but it was not. Musante held firm and did not return for a second season.

Although the role of David Toma was recast with Robert Blake, producers soon felt that Blake would be better served with a different concept; accordingly, Toma was overhauled and became the 1975 series Baretta. Apart from the circumstances of its conception, Baretta has no obvious on-screen connection to Toma, as the shows have no characters or settings in common.

Many of the people on the Toma writing staff went on to write episodes of The Rockford Files, which debuted shortly after Toma's cancellation. These writers included Stephen J. Cannell, Roy Huggins (who signed most of his work on both shows as "John Thomas James"), Juanita Bartlett, Zekial Marko, Don Carlos Dunaway, and Gloryette Clark. Series stars Musante, Strasberg, and Oakland also guest-starred on various episodes of The Rockford Files. An early version of the character of Jim Rockford had originally been conceived of as a guest star for a never-filmed episode of Toma; the script was rewritten and became The Rockford Files 90-minute pilot, and all connections and references to Toma were dropped.

== Episodes ==
=== Pilot (1973) ===
Episode	Directed by	Written by	Original air date
"Toma"	Richard T. Heffron	Gerald Di Pego, Edward Hume	March 21, 1973
90-minute TV-movie: A cop in Newark, New Jersey, defies his superiors to try to bring down the head of a Mafia numbers racket.

=== Season 1 (1973–74) ===
No.	Title	Directed by	Written by	Original release date
1	"The Oberon Contract"	Jeannot Szwarc	Teleplay by Stephen J. Cannell, Story by John Thomas James	October 4, 1973
Toma helps out an ex-con who has been framed for murder.
2	"Ambush on 7th Avenue"	Richard C. Bennett	Gloryette Clark, Roy Huggins and Edward Hume	October 11, 1973
Toma teams up with a college student to investigate a gang killing gone bad.
3	"Crime Without Victim"	Daniel Haller	Teleplay by Stephen J. Cannell, Story by John Thomas James	October 18, 1973
A hostage escapes from her kidnappers, but that is not the end of the matter, as Toma soon discovers.
4	"Stakeout"	Nicholas Colasanto	Roy Huggins	October 25, 1973
Toma and his new partner are assigned to track down a pusher by staking out his girlfriend.
5	"The Cain Connection"	Gary Nelson	Teleplay by Stephen J. Cannell, Story by John Thomas James	November 1, 1973
A desperate novelist decides to take a page from one of his own books when he accidentally acquires a shipment of heroin.
6	"Blockhouse Breakdown"	Richard C. Bennett	Teleplay by Lonne Elder III, Story by John Thomas James	November 8, 1973
Toma goes up against a sniper, Billy Haskell (Jan-Michael Vincent), who has decided to open fire on the crowds from the top of an office building.
7	"Frame-Up"	Marc Daniels	Stephen J. Cannell	November 15, 1973
When a numbers runner turns up beaten to within an inch of his life, Toma is accused of the crime.
8	"The Bambara Bust"	Alexander Grasshoff	Teleplay by Judy Burns, Story by John Thomas James	December 6, 1973
A heroin-smuggling ring that uses an ocean liner to move their product is Toma's next target.
9	"50% of Normal"	Jeannot Szwarc	Teleplay by Zekial Marko, Story by Peter Salerno and Jane Sparkes	January 18, 1974
A particularly violent rapist who wears a ski mask to conceal his identity is on the loose, and Toma is assigned to the case. NOTE: "Peter Salerno" is a pseudonym for series star Tony Musante; Jane Sparkes is Musante's wife.
10	"Rock-A-Bye"	Joseph Hardy	Jane Sparkes and Peter Salerno	January 25, 1974
Black marketeers are selling babies to desperate couples, forcing Toma to go undercover as a prospective client.
11	"Time and Place Unknown: Part 1"	Richard C. Bennett	Don Carlos Dunaway, Roy Huggins and Edward Hume	February 8, 1974
Toma poses as an ex-con stunt driver to infiltrate a burglary ring.
12	"Time and Place Unknown: Part 2"	*	*	February 15, 1974
Toma has infiltrated the burglary ring, but cannot warn the police about a planned heist without endangering his own life.
13	"A Funeral for Max Fabian"	Alexander Grasshoff	Zekial Marko	February 22, 1974
Toma takes on the dockworkers' union by going undercover as a stevedore.
14	"The Big Dealers"	Russ Mayberry	Edward Hume	March 1, 1974
Toma goes after drug dealers who are importing large quantities of high-quality heroin.
15	"The Contract on Alex Cordeen"	Alexander Grasshoff	Teleplay by Stephen J. Cannell, Story by John Thomas James	March 8, 1974
Mobster Alex Cordeen makes an unusual request of Toma; he wants the undercover cop to watch him be assassinated.
16	"Joey the Weep"	Charles S. Dubin	Teleplay by Don Carlos Dunaway, Story by John Thomas James	March 22, 1974
A small-time crook turns up dead, and Toma tries to work out why anyone would want him murdered.
17	"Friends of Danny Beecher"	Alexander Grasshoff	Teleplay by Edward Hume; Story by Gloryette Clark	March 29, 1974
Ex-con Danny Beecher kills the cop who put him away and goes on the run, and Toma has to find him.
18	"The Madam"	Michael Schultz	Teleplay by Juanita Bartlett, Story by John Thomas James	April 12, 1974
Toma's next target is a crook who gets women strung out on drugs and then sells them to the syndicate as prostitutes.
19	"Pound of Flesh"	*	Edward Hume	April 19, 1974
A case strikes close to home for Toma when he helps out a restaurant owner who used to be close to Patty, and is now the target of loan sharks.
20	"Indictment"	Gary Nelson	Teleplay by Juanita Bartlett, Story by John Thomas James	April 26, 1974
Toma finds himself at odds with a prosecutor who will do anything to win his cases.
21	"The Street"	Jeannot Szwarc	Zekial Marko	May 3, 1974
Toma has a racial war on his hands when a crime threatens to set off riots in the ghettos.
22	"The Accused"	Russ Mayberry	Teleplay by Don Carlos Dunaway, Story by David Toma	May 10, 1974
Bernie Travlos has a reputation as a good cop, but Toma has his doubts when Bernie is connected to a murder.

== Reviews ==
The series received favorable reviews and blistering criticism for its depictions of criminal and police violence. Although Toma was achieving relatively good ratings, the show ended after one season. A second season was planned, but Tony Musante refused to continue with the show. Musante had told the producers at the outset that he wanted to do only one season, but they mistakenly assumed that this was only a negotiating tactic and that he would return if the series was renewed. The show would rank 45th out of 80 shows that season, with a 17.7 rating.

== Legacy ==
=== Baretta ===
Rather than recast the starring role of Toma, the show was retooled as Baretta starring Robert Blake, with violent scenes toned down. Baretta debuted as a midseason replacement on ABC in early 1975.

=== The Rockford Files ===
According to interviews on The Greatest American Hero DVD set, a writers' strike during the shooting of Toma indirectly led to creation of The Rockford Files. Writer Stephen J. Cannell and his mentor Roy Huggins created the character of Jim Rockford as a way to get around an impossible schedule created by the strike.

=== Reruns ===
Despite having contributed to the development of the popular Baretta, reruns of Toma were never syndicated to local stations, and repeats of the show on national television after cancellation have been rare. Repeats of Toma aired in the late-1970s during ABC Late Night, and later on USA Network's Crimebusters in 1984–1985. One episode aired on TV Land in 2001.
