= The Vampyr: A Soap Opera =

- Country of origin: United Kingdom

Original release
- Network: BBC 2
- Release: 29 December 1992

The Vampyr: A Soap Opera is a miniseries based on Heinrich Marschner's opera Der Vampyr. It first aired on BBC 2 on 29 December 1992. The new English libretto was written by Charles Hart, based on a story by Janet Street-Porter and Nigel Finch, which was based on the original libretto by Wilhelm August Wohlbrück, which was based on John Polidori's short story "The Vampyre." It was conducted by David Parry and directed by Nigel Finch and co-directed by Robert Chevara.

== Roles ==
Role	Equivalent role in the Marschner opera	Voice type	Sung by
Ripley, a businessman, the vampyr	Ruthven	baritone	Omar Ebrahim
Sir Hugo Davenant, a city tycoon	Davenaut	bass	Richard van Allan
Miranda, his daughter	Malwina	soprano	Fiona O'Neill
Alex, her secret lover	Edgar	tenor	Philip Salmon
George, Ripley's chauffeur	George Dibdin, a servant	tenor	Colenton Freeman
Ginny, a model	Janthe	soprano	Willemijn van Gent
Berkeley, Ginny's lover	Sir John Berkley	bass	Roberto Salvatori
Emma, an executive secretary	Emmy	soprano	Sally-Ann Shepherdson
Susie, car-wash receptionist	Suse Blunt	mezzo-soprano	Sarah Jane Wright
Blunt, car-wash proprietor	Toms Blunt	baritone	Richard Suart

== Synopsis ==
Ripley, the vampire, was frozen in the late eighteenth century, but has revived in modern times and becomes a successful businessman. Neither his associate, Alex, nor anyone else knows of his criminal activities or secret life.

At a ceremony to invoke Satan, Ripley learns that his revival has come with a price: in the next three days, he must kill three women in order to gain another year of life. Ripley swears that it will be done, and goes on the hunt. He sees a couple, Ginny and Berkeley, having an argument; Berkeley storms off, and Ripley seduces Ginny and kills her. Ripley escapes from her apartment badly injured, and Alex discovers him half-dead. Ripley asks to be taken into the moonlight, where he begins to heal; frightened, Alex runs away. In the morning, the police find Ginny dead, and Berkeley blames himself.

Miranda, a rich heiress, waits for her lover Alex. They argue because he has arrived late and has been acting secretively for a while, but eventually make up. He spends the night with her. In the morning, her father, Davenant, arrives and tells her that she must marry the Earl of Marsden to secure a business deal. There is an engagement party that evening. Alex arrives, only to discover that the Earl of Marsden is Ripley. He tells Alex that he himself will have Miranda, and threatens him.

Later that evening, Emma, an executive, is with her friends in a bar. Ripley arrives with his chauffeur, George. Emma approaches Ripley, and they share drinks. Ripley suggests that they go somewhere more private, and steps out for a moment. George attempts to flirt with Emma, but she spills her drink in his lap. Alex, who has been watching through the window, confronts Ripley. Ripley tells Alex that he is a vampire, and threatens him with damnation should Alex reveal the secret. Having given George the rest of the night off, Ripley drives off with Emma. They stop in a deserted park, where he kills her.

In the morning, Susie arrives to her job at a car wash, telling her co-workers that she read about Ginny's murder in the paper. When Ripley's car goes through the wash, they discover blood; they pry open the trunk and discover Emma's body. George arrives to pick up the car and recognizes Emma.

Later that morning, Alex is caught in traffic, frightened by what Ripley has told him and trying to leave the city. When he sees the news of Emma's murder in the paper, he decides to return to the city and rescue Miranda.

As the wedding of Ripley and Miranda is about to begin, George arrives and tries to tell everyone that Ripley is a murderer. Believing him to be a madman, the police drag him away. The wedding begins, but Alex bursts in, ignoring Ripley's threats and revealing him to be a vampire. Enraged, Ripley attacks Miranda, but lightning strikes the church and a cross falls from the ceiling, killing the vampire. Davenant declares that Alex must marry Miranda, and everyone rejoices.

== Differences between The Vampyr and Marschner's opera ==
Although the libretto of The Vampyr is based on that of Der Vampyr, there have been numerous changes because of the modernization of the plot and the constraints of the miniseries format:

- Almost every choral number has been cut
- Most of the roles are renamed
- The characters' relationships have been changed: for example, Berkeley becomes Ginny's lover rather than her father, and Emma is no longer engaged to George
- Alex's aria is relocated from the second act to the first act, after he finds Ripley's body
- George sings Alex's part in the first half of the Act II finale
- The drinking quintet, in which Suse Blunt scolds her husband and his friends for drinking, becomes a friendly scene between co-workers at a car wash

== See also ==
- Vampire film
- List of vampire television series
