= Fear and Loathing on the Road to Hollywood =

1978 film directed by Nigel Finch

- Directed by: Nigel Finch
- Edited by: Chris Lysaght
- Production company: BBC
- Release date: 1978
- Running time: 50 minutes
- Country: United Kingdom
- Language: English

Fear and Loathing on the Road to Hollywood (also known as Fear and Loathing in Gonzovision), is a 1978 British documentary film directed by Nigel Finch for the BBC TV Omnibus programme, on the subject of Hunter S. Thompson.

== Scenario ==
The film pairs Thompson with illustrator Ralph Steadman, as they travel to Hollywood via Death Valley and Barstow from Las Vegas. It also includes scenes of Thompson's home, Owl Farm in Aspen, Colorado, and contains interviews with Thompson and Steadman, as well as some short excerpts from Thompson's writings, and displays of Steadman's artwork.

== Factual inaccuracies ==
The film's narrator states that Thompson was a former member of the Hells Angels motorcycle club. Thompson was never a patched member of – nor was he prospected for membership in – the Hells Angels. At best, Thompson was an authorized observer and allowed intimate access to the Hells Angels' lifestyle and activities while writing Hell's Angels: The Strange and Terrible Saga of the Outlaw Motorcycle Gangs. The narrator also states that Thompson ran for sheriff in his hometown of Aspen, Colorado. Thompson's hometown was Louisville, Kentucky – not Aspen. According to Thompson's son Juan, the Thompson family had been in Kentucky for generations.

== Home media ==
The film is featured in The Criterion Collection edition of Fear and Loathing in Las Vegas.
