= Rupert Haselden =

British writer (1957–1994)

- Born: September 25, 1957; United Kingdom
- Died: May 8, 1994 (aged 36); United Kingdom
- Occupations: Writer, essayist, critic
- Writing career
- Language: English

Rupert Anthony Greville Haselden (25 September 1957 – 8 May 1994) was a British writer known for essays, short fiction, and criticism on contemporary gay male culture.

== Life and career ==
Haselden was born in Sussex, England in 1957. He studied English literature at University of Cambridge. As a teenager he was a sex worker (1972–3), and as an adult served for one year as a staff member at Buckingham Palace (1976-77).

From the early 1980s he wrote short stories, essays, and reviews for literary magazines, newspapers and journals, while working as a film publicist, including in New York (1978-1982).

His screenwriting credits include scripting the television movie Raspberry Ripple (1988) and the period drama John Daniel the First (1989).

He gained notoriety after publishing an essay, 'Gay Abandon', in the newspaper The Guardian in September 1991. The essay drew attention for its candid depiction of gay life during the AIDS crisis. Using interviews conducted at the London Apprentice, a gay club in London, he argued that promiscuity, cruising for sex, and gay clone culture were once subversive, but that AIDS transformed them into fatalistic sites of danger. The essay describes a shift from the siege mentality of the 1980s to a reckless hedonism in the 1990s, suggesting that HIV infection had become perversely normalised, or glorified as a rite of passage. As he reflected in an interview with the journalist Simon Garfield:

I was very concerned about a number of young friends that I had who were finding great thrills in not having safe sex, night after night in the clubs. And I felt that gay liberation had, as I said, got stuck in the liberation phase. Unlike feminism and race issues which had moved on beyond that, in the face of AIDS we had retreated to the ghetto and to the support structures that it supplied. We seem to not have any clue of a future and nobody seems to be discussing the future, everybody's so busy coping with this awful present of illness everywhere. I felt we continued to only offer one lifestyle up for inspection, which was the lifestyle of the ghetto, boys in blue jeans and T-shirts running off to the clubs and the discos, and that we were failing to reveal the range of lifestyles that gays live.

Critics including AIDS activist Simon Watney complained that Haselden risked reinforcing homophobic rhetoric, even as he aimed to stage an internal reckoning within the gay community. The essay prompted a picket of the Guardian offices by gay activists including Derek Jarman. Guardian editor Peter Preston met with representatives of lesbian and gay organisations, resulting in a significant improvement in both the breadth and quality of the paper's coverage of LGBTQ+ topics.

Haselden's life partner was the filmmaker Nigel Finch (1949–1995). The two lived together in Balham, South London from 1981 until Haselden's death in 1994. Haselden is named as the dedicatee of Finch's film Stonewall (1995). Finch died less than a year after Haselden on 4 February 1995.

== Death ==
Haselden was diagnosed as having AIDS in 1988 or 1989. He died from AIDS-related illnesses on 8 May 1994, aged 36. His funeral took place at St Paul's Church in Clapham Old Town, South London.
