= The War Between the Classes =

1985 novel by Gloria D. Miklowitz

The War Between The Classes
- First edition
- Author: Gloria D. Miklowitz
- Language: English
- Genre: Young adult novel
- Publisher: Delacorte Press
- Publication date: 1985
- Publication place: United Kingdom
- Media type: Print (hardback & paperback)
- Pages: 158 pp
- ISBN: 0-440-99406-3
- OCLC: 40663489

The War Between The Classes is a novel written by Gloria D. Miklowitz.

The novel explores how society can overcome the stereotypes taught by media through its teen-aged protagonist. The book focuses on the main character, Amy, as she struggles to keep a good relationship with her boyfriend throughout the story due to the disapproval of their parents. It also focuses on the colour armband game, and Amy's feelings as she goes against all the laws of the game.

The novel was adapted into a television special, as part of the CBS Schoolbreak Special series.

== Summary ==
The story begins with Amy and Adam making their way to the school luau after leaving Amy's house, where the story introduces its themes of racism and prejudice. Later, Amy's high-school class plays a game created by their teacher, Mr. Otero. In the game, there are classes which are represented by armbands: Blues – highest, richest; Dark Greens – upper-middle class, semi-rich; Light Greens – lower-middle class, semi-poor; Oranges – lowest class, very poor. To further split up the classes, there is the superior sex, Teks(females), and the inferior sex, No-Teks(males). There are also groups of Color Game “policemen" (known as G4's in the color game), which are older students who played the game in previous years. They record the students’ activities, and make note of any good or bad behavior, which can result in demotions or promotions. The Color Game runs like this: Lower classes, or No-Teks, must bow when they meet eyes with a higher class, or Tek. Higher classes can give orders to lower classes. Lower classes may not speak to a higher class unless spoken to, and can only reply in a short answer. You must have your armband and journal with you at all times. The main character in this book is Emiko “Amy” Sumoto. She comes from a Japanese family, and her parents believe she should keep the family tradition going by marrying a Japanese boy. Instead, she is interested in a rich, White youth named Adam. In the Color Game, all the minorities in the class turn out to be high colors, and rich whites end up as lower colors, which is all planned out by their teacher. Although Amy is used to being treated as a lower person in real life, along with the Latinos, she doesn't feel right with the power she has. However, being one of the most powerful people in the class, she decides to try and unite all the colors to an equal rank. She puts up “All Colors Unite” posters all over the school, causing her to be demoted from Blue to Orange along with Juan, who helped her attach the advertisements. Afterward, the oranges make four-colored armbands for all students to wear. Finally she succeeds in doing this, and unites the whole class as one. The Color Game was arranged to show real-life racial, sex, and economic differences between people.
