= Katrina Elayne Steward =

American choreographer, dancer, singer and actress

Katrina Elayne Steward (born October 26, 1979) is an American choreographer, dancer, singer and actress. She was the 2005–2006 Miss Black Arkansas USA in the Miss Black USA Pageant.

Steward is a community activist, with a focus on Celebrating Diversity, and has been awarded her own day, in the State of Arkansas. She is the first choreographer in the city of Fort Smith, Arkansas to have an all black Baptist praise dance group, worship in a Catholic church. Steward worked closely with Governor Mike Huckabee during Hurricane Katrina, during her time as Miss Black Arkansas USA 2005-2006.

Steward graduated from Northside High School in Fort Smith, Arkansas and attended the University of Arkansas – Fort Smith.

Steward also performed in the Good Company Players production of Hairspray in 2009.
