= Arena (British TV series) =

British television documentary series

- Message in a bottle title sequence used by Arena since 1975.
- Genre: Documentary
- Created by: Humphrey Burton
- Written by: Various
- Directed by: Various
- Opening theme: "Another Green World" by Brian Eno
- Country of origin: United Kingdom
- Original language: English
- No. of episodes: over 600

Production
- Editors: Mark Bell (2018–present); Anthony Wall (1985–2018); Anthony Wall and Nigel Finch (1985–1995); Alan Yentob (1979–1985); Leslie Megahey (1977–1978); Various (1975–1977)
- Running time: 60 minutes
- Production company: BBC Arts

Original release
- Network: BBC Two (1975–2011); BBC Four (2003–present)
- Release: 1 October 1975 – present

Arena is a British television documentary series, made and broadcast by the BBC since 1 October 1975. Voted by TV executives in Broadcast magazine as one of the top 50 most influential programmes of all time, it has produced more than six hundred episodes directed by, among others, Frederick Baker, Jana Boková, Jonathan Demme, Nigel Finch, Mary Harron, Vikram Jayanti, Vivian Kubrick, Paul Lee, Adam Low, Bernard MacMahon, James Marsh, Leslie Megahey, Volker Schlondorff, Martin Scorsese, Julien Temple, Anthony Wall, Leslie Woodhead, and Alan Yentob.

== History ==
The arts strand Arena was initially created in 1975 by the BBC Head of Music & Arts at that time, Humphrey Burton, when he founded a magazine named Arena exploring art, design, filmmaking, and theatre. In 1977, under producer and director Leslie Megahey, the strand divided into Arena Theatre and Arena Art and Design, and Arena became less of a magazine and more a home for short, distinctive and stylish films about mainly British theatre and visual arts. In 1978, Megahey became editor of Omnibus and Alan Yentob, who had been supervising Arena Theatre, took over and the two themes were merged. The series, relaunched in January 1979 and renamed simply Arena, began to adopt a format of single subject essays. It earned great critical acclaim for its enthusiasm for the popular as well as the high arts. During Yentob's time as editor, Arena had six BAFTA nominations and three BAFTA awards.

A group of radical directors, notably Nigel Finch and Anthony Wall, gathered around Yentob and Arena, including Nigel Williams and Mary Dickinson. Hits from 1979 included Who Is Poly Styrene?, La Dame Aux Gladiolas, a portrait of Edna Everage, and most notably the groundbreaking My Way, an examination of the appeal of the song, by Finch and Wall. It was the first of their collaborations, which developed a new kind of arts film, taking an unlikely subject and building a poetic meditation on its various aspects - further examples include The Chelsea Hotel (1981), The Private Life of the Ford Cortina (1982), Desert Island Discs (1982). Other successes included Megahey's portrait of Orson Welles (1982), Williams's study of George Orwell (1982), Yentob's portrait of Mel Brooks (1981) and Wall's four-part documentary on Slim Gaillard (1989).

On Yentob's move to become Head of Music & Arts in 1985, Finch and Wall took over as joint editors of Arena until Finch's death in 1995. Following a period of uncertainty concerning the future of the arts strand, series editor Wall protected the series in a reshuffle of the BBC. Since then Arena has been transmitted outside the conventional weekly broadcast strand on BBC Two and latterly on BBC Four.

Under Wall and Finch, Arena developed the idea of the themed evening, beginning with Blues Night (1985), followed by Caribbean Nights (1986), Animal Night (1989), Food Night (1990), Texas Saturday Night (1991), Radio Night simulcast with BBC Radio 4 (1993) and Stories My Country Told Me (1995), a three-and-a-half-hour presentation on Nations and Nationalism. Since then Arena has won numerous awards with regular screenings at the BFI Southbank and has continued to cover the arts and culture at the highest level, with films on Bob Dylan, Harold Pinter, The National Theatre and Spitting Image.

Arena developed a substantial online presence featuring the Arena Hotel, a site that turns the 600-film Arena archive into a resource to build an online hotel for the stars. The Arena Hotel was nominated for a Focal International Award in 2013. Werner Herzog has praised the series as "the oasis in the sea of insanity that is television".

Wall retired in 2018, and the strand is now overseen by commissioning editor Mark Bell.

== Branding ==
The programme's theme music is taken from the title track of the 1975 album Another Green World by Brian Eno, himself the subject of a 2010 Arena film subtitled Another Green World.

The Arena opening titles were voted among the "Top 5 Most Influential Opening Titles in the History of Television" by Broadcast magazine in 2004.

== Awards and nominations ==
Arena has won a Primetime and International Emmys, a Grammy, nine BAFTAs, six Royal Television Society Awards, a Peabody and the Prix Italia. Arena also won the Sundance Grand Jury Prize for Paris Is Burning (1990), the Best Performance Award for Lili Taylor's role in I Shot Andy Warhol (1996) at the Sundance Film Festival, and the SFFIF's Mel Novikoff Award.

== Selected filmography ==
Year	Films	Director
1975	Theatre	
1978	Art and Design: The Journey	Nigel Finch Alan Yentob
1979	Now and Then - Anthony Green	Nigel Williams
1979	My Way	Nigel Finch
1979	Six Days in September	Judy Marle
1980	Rudies Come Back: The Rise and Rise of 2 Tone	Jeff Perks
1980	Andrea Dunbar and Victoria Wood	
1980	Making The Shining	Vivian Kubrick
1981	Gary Glitter: Did You Miss Me?	
1981	The Comic Strip Hero	Anthony Wall
1981	Chelsea Hotel	Nigel Finch
1981	Edward Hopper	Carol Bell
1981	Brixton to Barbados	Anthony Wall
1982	The Private Life of the Ford Cortina	Nigel Finch
1982	Desert Island Discs	Anthony Wall
1982	Last Waltz in Vienna	
1982	The Orson Welles Story	Alan Yentob L. Megahey
1982	Mike Leigh: Making Plays	
1983	Burroughs	H. Brookner
1983	Borges and I	D. Wheatley
1983	Bette Davis: A Basically Benevolent Volcano	
1984	Billie Holiday: The Long Night of Lady Day	John Jeremy
1984	Sunset People	Jana Boková
1984	Beat This: A Hip-Hop History	Dick Fontaine
1984	Francis Bacon	Adam Low
1985	Old Kent Road	M. Dickinson
1985	Blues Night: 1. Sonny Boy Williamson Sings	Kevin Loader
1985	Blues Night: 2. B. B. King Speaks	Kevin Loader
1985	Blues Night: 3. Chicago Blues	Kevin Loader
1985	Blues Night: 4. Blind John Davis	Kevin Loader
1985	Blues Night: 5. Blues Medley	Kevin Loader
1985	Blues Night: 6. Big Bill Blues	Kevin Loader
1985	Saint Genet	Nigel Williams C. Chabot
1986	Tosca's Kiss	
1986	Louise Brooks	Charles Chabot Richard Leacock
1986	Tango Mio	Jana Boková
1986	Henry Moore	
1986	Caribbean Nights: C. L. R. James' First Cricket XI	C. Pattinson
1987	The Confessions of Robert Crumb	M. Dickinson
1987	Evelyn Waugh Trilogy	Adam Low
1987	Stop Making Sense	Jonathan Demme
1988	Kapuściński	Adam Low
1989	The Other Graham Greene	Nigel Finch
1989	Tales from Barcelona	Jana Boková
1989	Slim Gaillard's Civilisation (Episode 1) - "A Traveller's Tale"	Anthony Wall
1989	Slim Gaillard's Civilisation (Episode 2) - "How High The Moon"	Anthony Wall
1989	Slim Gaillard's Civilisation (Episode 3) - "My Dinner With Dizzy"	Anthony Wall
Slim Gaillard's Civilisation (Episode 4) - "Everything's OK in the UK"		Anthony Wall
1990	Paris is Burning	J. Livingston Nigel Finch
1990	Havana	Jana Boková
Agatha Christie: An Unseen Portrait	James Marsh	
1991	Miller Meets Mandela	B. Marcus Nigel Finch
1991	Kenneth Anger's Hollywood Babylon	Nigel Finch
1991	The Human Face	Nichola Bruce Michael Coulson
1992	Masters of the Canvas	Mary Dickinson
1992	An Argentinian Journey	Jana Boková
Armistead Maupin is a Man I Dreamt Up		
1993	Edward Said	F Hanly T. May
1993	The Last Soviet Citizen	Leslie Woodhead
1994	Kalashnikov	Paul Lee
1994	Bahía of all the Saints	Jana Boková
Marvin Gaye	J. Marsh	
1995	The Peter Sellers Story Part 1: Southsea to Shepperton	Peter Lydon
1995	The Peter Sellers Story Part 2: Jack to Jacques	Peter Lydon
1995	The Peter Sellers Story Part 3: I am Not a Funny Man	Peter Lydon
1995	Punk and the Pistols	P. Tickell
1995	Stonewall	Nigel Finch
1996	Stories My Country Told Me: The Meaning of Nationhood - Eric Hobsbawn and Slovak Nationalism	Frederick Baker
1996	Stories My Country Told Me: The Meaning of Nationhood - Desmond Tutu and the Rainbow Nation	T. May
1996	Stories My Country Told Me: The Meaning of Nationhood - Eqbal Ahmad on the Grand Trunk Road	H. O. Hazareth
1996	The Burger & the King: The Life & Cuisine of Elvis Presley	James Marsh
1996	I Shot Andy Warhol	M. Harron
1996	Tony Bennett's New York	Leslie Woodhead
1997	Busby, Stein and Shankly: The Football Men	F. Hanly
1997	The Banana	Kate Maynell
1998	Frank Sinatra: The Voice of the Century	Alan Lewens
1998	The Brian Epstein Story: The Sun Will Shine Tomorrow	Anthony Wall
1998	The Brian Epstein Story: Tomorrow Never Knows	Anthony Wall
1999	Cuba Night	P. Esterson J. Shinner
1999	Salman Rushdie	M. Dickinson
1999	Looking for the Iron Curtain	Anthony Wall
2000	Wisconsin Death Trip	James Marsh
2000	Clint Eastwood	Anthony Wall B. Ricker
2001	Salgado: Spectre of Hope	P. Carlin
2001	My Way	
2002	Kurosawa	Adam Low
2002	Harold Pinter Season at the BBC	Anthony Wall Nigel Williams Martin Rosenbaum
2003	The Many Lives of Richard Attenborough	
2003	Imagine Imagine	Frederick Baker
2003	Dylan Thomas: Grave to Cradle	Anthony Wall
2004	Pavarotti: The Last Tenor	Frank Hanly
2004	Shadowing the Third Man	Frederick Baker
2004	Painting the Clouds: A Portrait of Dennis Potter	Martin Rosenbaum Nigel Williams
2005	Hank Williams: Honky Tonk Blues	Morgan Neville
2005	Calling Hedy Lamarr	Georg Misch
2005	Bacon's Arena	Adam Low
2005	No Direction Home: Bob Dylan	Martin Scorsese
2005	The Princess and Panorama	Samantha Peters
2006	Pete Doherty	Ashtar Alkhirsan
2007	Underground	Zimena Percival
2007	Bob Marley's Exodus '77	Anthony Wall
2007	Encountering Bergman	David Thompson
2007	Bergman and the Cinema	Marie Nyrerod
2007	Ken Dodd's Happiness	Ashtar Al Khirsan
2008	V.S. Naipaul: The Strange Luck Of...	Adam Low
2008	Phil Spector	Vikram Jayanti
2009	T. S. Eliot	Adam Low
2010	Brian Eno: Another Green World	Nicola Roberts
2010	Harold: A Celebration	Anthony Wall
2010	Dave Brubeck: In His Own Sweet Way	Bruce Ricker
2011	Produced by George Martin	Frank Hanly
2011	George Harrison: Living in the Material World	Martin Scorsese
2012	Dickens On Film	Anthony Wall
2012	Sonny Rollins: This is Who I Am	Dick Fontaine
2012	The Dreams of William Golding	Adam Low
2012	Jonathan Miller	David Thompson
2012	Amy Winehouse: The Day She Came to Dingle	Maurice Linnane
2012	The Beatles' Magical Mystery Tour Revisited	Frank Hanly
2012	Screen Goddesses	David Thompson
2012	Sister Wendy and the Art of the Gospels	Randall Wright
2013	AKA Norman Parkinson	Nicola Roberts
2013	The National Theatre	Adam Low
2014	Whatever Happened to Spitting Image?	Anthony Wall
2014	The 50 Year Argument: The New York Review of Books	Martin Scorsese David Tedeschi
2015	Night and Day	
2016	All the Worlds a Screen: Shakespeare on Film	
2017	The American Epic Sessions	Bernard MacMahon
2017	American Epic	Bernard MacMahon
2018	Nothing Like a Dame	Dames Eileen Atkins, Judi Dench, Joan Plowright and Maggie Smith
2019	Bergman: A Year in the Life	
2021	Delia Derbyshire: The Myths and the Legendary Tapes	
2022	River	
2023	The Mysterious Mr. Lagerfield	
2023	The Stones and Brian Jones	
2023	Coco Chanel Unbuttoned	
2023	Being Kae Tempest	
2023	Caroline Aherne: Queen of Comedy	
2024	Loaded: Lad's Mags and Mayhem	
2024	From Roger Moore With Love	
2024	Maria Callas: The Final Act	
2025	Steven McRae: Dancing Back to the Light	
2025	My Brain: After the Rupture	
2025	Kim Novak's Vertigo	Alexandre O. Philippe
2026	McCartney: The Hunt for the Lost Bass	Arthur Cary

== See also ==
- Storyville, a similar documentary series by the BBC

== Sources ==
- Vahimagi, Tise. British Television: An Illustrated Guide. Oxford: Oxford University Press / British Film Institute, 1994. ISBN 0-19-818336-4.
