= Illinois State University College of Fine Arts =

The Illinois State University College of Fine Arts (Wonsook Kim College of Fine Arts) offers programs in art, music, theatre, dance, and arts technology. The name of the college was officially changed to "Wonsook Kim College of Fine Arts" in recognition of a $12 million gift from the artist and alumn Wonsook Kim.

== Wonsook Kim School of Art ==
The art school at Illinois State University provides a professional education for students desiring careers in the visual arts.The baccalaureate program provides students the opportunity to mentor with a faculty sponsor and to produce a professional solo exhibition prior to graduation. The master’s program provides visual artists the opportunity to work toward their development as artists.

=== Accreditation ===
The National Association of Schools of Art and Design fully accredits the Wonsook Kim School of Art.

=== Undergraduate programs ===
- Art History
- Fine Arts
- Graphic Design
- Studio Arts
- Teacher Education

=== Graduate programs ===
- Fine Arts
- Art Education
- Visual Culture

== School of Music ==
Illinois State University offers a variety of study programs within the spectrum of music. More than fifteen ensemble opportunities are available to all students on-campus, plus multiple chamber music ensembles and musical theatre/opera productions. Admission to the program is through audition. There are also private instruction opportunities taught by professors, not teaching assistants, on all wind, brass and percussion instruments, as well as piano, voice, and strings, including classical guitar.

=== Accreditation ===
Illinois State is one of 593 schools of music accredited by the National Association of Schools of Music (NASM).

=== Undergraduate programs ===
- Band and Orchestral Instrument Performance
- Classical Guitar Performance
- Liberal Arts
- Music Business
- Music Composition
- Music Education
- Music Theater
- Music Therapy
- Keyboard Pedagogy and Performance
- Voice Performance

=== Graduate programs ===
- Collaborative Piano
- Music Composition
- Music Conducting
- Music Education: The summer's only program in the graduate program in Music Education affords teachers the flexibility to complete a master’s.
- Music Performance
- Music Therapy

=== RED NOTE New Music Festival ===
The annual RED NOTE New Music Festival at Illinois State University is a week-long event which features outstanding performances of contemporary concert music. Highlights of past seasons include appearances by Ensemble Mise-en, City of Tomorrow, Momenta Quartet, Orchid Ensemble, Fulcrum Point New Music Ensemble, Color Field Ensemble, Spektral Quartet, Del Sol Quartet, loadbang and Ensemble Dal Niente. Featured guest composers have included Stephen Hartke, Steven Stucky, Joan Tower, Lee Hyla, Sydney Hodkinson and Augusta Read Thomas. RED NOTE also holds an annual Composition Competition which brings in entries from around the world.

== School of Theatre, Dance, and Film ==
The School of Theatre, Dance, and Film offers conservatory-level training within the context of a liberal arts education. Performance opportunities with Illinois State include the professional Illinois Shakespeare Festival, extensive main stage, second-stage and studio productions, plus student produced works. Admission to the Acting, Dance, and Dance Education sequences are through audition. Admission to the Design/Production sequence is through portfolio.

=== Undergraduate programs ===
- Acting
- Dance
- Dance Education
- Design/Production
- Theater Education
- Theater Studies

=== Graduate programs ===
- Master of Arts or Master of Science in Theater
- Master of Fine Arts in Theater
  - Acting
  - Costume Design
  - Directing
  - Lighting Design
  - Scene Design

== School of Creative Technologies ==
The School of Creative Technologies integrates study across the arts with the study of digital technology. Students use digital media to explore areas of traditional creative art making in music, sound, still and moving imagery and typography to express ideas and solve problems. Admission is through portfolio.
