= After the Bomb (novel) =

Novel by Gloria D. Miklowitz

- Front cover of the first edition of the book
- Author: Gloria D. Miklowitz
- Language: English
- Genre: Science fiction Young adult literature
- Publisher: Scholastic Corporation
- Publication date: 1985
- Publication place: United States
- Media type: Print (Paperback)
- Pages: 156 pp (paperback edition)
- ISBN: 0-590-33287-2
- OCLC: 11858242

After the Bomb is a post-apocalyptic juvenile novel by Gloria D. Miklowitz, first published in 1985.

== Plot ==
The story follows a teen, Philip, who attempts to survive in the aftermath of a nuclear missile accidentally launched at Los Angeles by the Soviet Union, with his mother (the father is presumed dead as he worked in downtown Los Angeles, ground zero for the bomb), older brother, and friends. During the story Philip develops an attitude of "Me and mine first", with him being portrayed as switching the tag of an evacuee with his mother's so that his mother would be evacuated to another state for treatment.

== Writing of the novel ==
Miklowitz based the protagonist of the book, Philip, on her son, who was awkward as a teenager. Her regular publisher refused the book due to its grim content, so it and its sequel were published instead by Scholastic, who also issued a teachers guide to accompany the book and facilitate classroom discussions. The book was written with the objective of turning young people into anti-nuclear weapons activists.

== Reception ==
The book won the 1989 Iowa Books for Young Adults Poll. A May 1985 review published in the Wausau Daily Herald by Alice Hornbacker described the subject-matter of the book as "scary and morbid", but also as offering young readers afraid of nuclear war not only an opportunity to "sort out their unspoken fears, but articulate and share them as well". A 1995 review in the book Anatomy of wonder: a critical guide to science fiction described After the Bomb as being "well researched and harrowing" and featuring "attractive characterization". A 1986 review of the book in Fantasy Review by Martha A. Barrter was more critical, however, describing the book as "almost blithely optimistic". Marijo Grimes, writing for the English Journal, spoke of the book's appeal in that "students can all relate to the fear of an atomic bomb attack, and this slender volume is of a nonthreatening size, which is a plus."

== Sequel ==
In 1987 a sequel entitled After The Bomb: Week One was published. It portray's Philip's reunion with his father, who had been in Pasadena when the attack happened, and the chaotic evacuation of the area of the attack.
