= Little Miss Perfect =

- Genre: Reality television
- Country of origin: United States
- Original language: English
- No. of seasons: 2
- No. of episodes: 10

Production
- Running time: 48 minutes

Original release
- Network: WE tv
- Release: February 18, 2009 – April 6, 2010

Related
- Toddlers & Tiaras

Little Miss Perfect is an American reality television series that follows girls in the same beauty pageant each week. The pageant is hosted by Michael Galanes with judges Deedy Melanson, Nyahsha Zimucha, David Gilbert, and sometimes Janet McCullogh.

The show, like Toddlers & Tiaras, is aired without narration to avoid judgment. Unlike Toddlers & Tiaras, Little Miss Perfect has only two girls instead of three families and there is only one girl awarded a crown, sash, and money at the pageant.

Season 1 premiered on February 18, 2009, and season 2 debuted on January 12, 2010.

== Episodes ==
=== Season 1 ===
No. overall	No. in season	Title	Winner	Original release date
1	1	"Shelbie vs Hadlie"	Hadlie Campbell	February 18, 2009
It is a vintage 400-dollar bathing suit against a live 6-foot python. Will Hadlie come out and take the crown again or will Shelbie, the natural, shy girl, bring home the crown.
2	2	"Emily vs Jordan"	Emily Tye	TBA
3	3	"Sabrina vs Amber"	Jena-Deme Revels	TBA
Will an extreme glitz bathing suit with sweet and styling, tomboy catch the eye of the judges or a Broadway entourage with dramatic girly-girl Amber let her take home the crown?
4	4	"Jayne vs Katelyn"	Katelyn Torres	TBA
Russian pageant mom Irina struggles to put together a yankee doodle themed outfit with the "right pageant" as Katelyn's divorced parents reunite and put together a rock star routine for their daughter.
5	5	"Traci and Alexa vs Rhonda and Kendall"	Traci and Alexa Pangonas	TBA
Pageant mom Traci throws it hard on her daughter while her husband is serving in the military. Rhonda and Kendall are mother-daughter duo and plan to wing their wow-wear as Kendall goes natural.
6	6	"Ashley vs BrandiJean"	Ashley Ramkissoon	TBA
Ashley, the reigning Little Miss Citrus, brings it back to the 1960s as 9 year old BrandiJean plans to "disguise" herself as Marilyn Monroe.

=== Season 2 ===
No. overall	No. in season	Title	Winner	Original release date
7	1	"Madison vs Angelina"	Alie Gilstrap	January 12, 2010
Angelina and Madison, two best friends, compete as Madison gets glitzed up with spray tans and fake hair as Angelina's mom only has her daughter go with products from God on Earth.
8	2	"Destinee vs Shelbie"	Shelbie Rhodes	TBA
Shelbie's back from her "braces" break from pageantry but will she have to outwow Destinee with her western wear?
9	3	"Lexi vs Brianna"	Lexi Teaff	TBA
Lexi plans to impress the judges without a flipper doing a story-telling wow wear as Little Red Riding Hood as Brianna goes with her natural beauty as a Platinum Edition Brianna Doll.
10	4	"Trinity vs Taylor"	Alain Baten	TBA
Taylor, a natural pageant pro plans to wow the judges doing Kung-fu as Trinity's outfit is wow but she is completely clueless coming to dancing.
11	5	"Asia vs Kaylee"	Asia Hickson	TBA
Asia, an accomplished beauty queen, is on a mission to impress her mom; Mr. Michael changes Kaylee's outfit and routine just days before the pageant.
12	6	"Tykierre ki-ki vs Kiersten"	Kiersten Johnson	TBA
Kiki can never go without winning while Kiersten can never go without losing but who will win Little Miss Perfect?
13	7	"Mayce vs Jacee"	Mayce Harden	TBA
Jacee and Mayce are two best friends and have never competed against each other. But who will go home happy?
14	8	"Patience vs Jayne"	Cherish Davis	TBA
Jayne Dolinsky (from Season 1, episode "Katelyn vs Jayne") is back to compete at Little Miss Perfect! This time she comes prepared with a Michael Jackson themed routine and a new beauty dress. Patience, has been in pageants for years but according to her older sister, "has no patience" and does not like to practice. Her mom is proud of her for doing well in her firefighter wow wear routine.
15	9	"Taylor vs Madison vs Maggie"	Taylor Cox	TBA
Sisters Taylor, 10, and Madison, 9, compete against pageant newcomer, Maggie, 9. Taylor has been competing in glitz pageants since she was 3 and is a pro already. Younger sister Madison competed in a few glitz pageants as a toddler but has recently only competed in natural pageants.
16	10	"Kyndal vs Alyssa"	Alyssa Bernard	TBA
Kyndal, 5, the youngest of 3 pageant sisters (older sisters Kaylen and Kelsey are also competing in Little Miss Perfect), has been on a losing streak. Alyssa, 5, Nyasha's favorite, is adorable but can she stick to her Army routine or will she be scared?
17	11	"Kayla vs Aliyah"	Hannah White	TBA
Kayla, 9, a clogger and natural pageant pro competes against Aliyah, 10, who has also competed in natural pageants in the past. Kayla's mom wants to prepare for the pageant on her own and even makes Kayla's dress. Aliyah takes her first dance class to learn her wow wear routine and her mom and grandmother help make her cowgirl outfit.
18	12	"Shelby vs Kaylee"	Shelby Hiedel	TBA
