= Nigel Finch =

British film director (1949–1995)

Nigel Lucius Graeme Finch (1 August 1949 – 14 February 1995) was an English film director and filmmaker whose career influenced the growth of British gay cinema.

== Biography ==
Nigel Finch was born in Tenterden, Kent, the son of Graham and Tibby Finch, and raised in Bromley, south east London. He studied art history at the University of Sussex.

Finch began working as co-editor for the BBC television documentary series Arena in the early 1970s. He produced and directed many notable programs including My Way (1978), and The Private Life of the Ford Cortina (1982). He rose to prominence with the documentary Chelsea Hotel (1981), which profiled the famed New York hotel and its legacy of famous gay guests, including Oscar Wilde, Tennessee Williams, William S. Burroughs, Quentin Crisp and Andy Warhol. His documentary subjects include artist Robert Mapplethorpe (1988), filmmaker Kenneth Anger (1991), and artist Louise Bourgeois (1994). Finch went on to direct films such as the BAFTA-nominated drama The Lost Language of Cranes, and the musical soap opera The Vampyr.

Finch's longterm partner was the writer Rupert Haselden. Haselden died of AIDS-related complications on 8 May 1994, aged 36.

Finch died from AIDS-related illness in London in 1995 during post-production of his first full-length feature film Stonewall, a docudrama loosely based on events leading up to the 1969 Stonewall riots in New York City.

== Filmography ==
Film

- The Errand (1980) (Short film)
- The Caravaggio Conspiracy (1984)
- Stonewall (1995)

TV movies

- Ligmalion: A Musical for the 80s (1985)
- Raspberry Ripple (1986)
- The Lost Language of Cranes (Note: Also featured as an episode in the Screen Two series) (1991)

TV series

Year	Title	Notes
1986	Screen Two	Episode "Shergar"
1988	Bergerac	Episode "Whatever Lola Wants"
1992–1993	The Vampyr: A Soap Opera	Miniseries

=== Documentary works ===
TV movies

- 25x5: The Continuing Adventures of the Rolling Stones (1989)

TV series

Year	Title	Episode
1978	Omnibus	"Fear and Loathing in Gonzovision" (Also producer)
1978	Arena	My Way
1981	Arena	Did You Miss Me?
1981	Arena	Chelsea Hotel
1982	Arena	The Private Life of the Ford Cortina
1983	Arena	Kurt Vonnegut, Jr: "Deadeye Dick"
1988	Arena	Robert Mapplethorpe
1991	Arena	Kenneth Anger
1993	Arena	Tales of Rock 'N' Roll: Peggy Sue
1993	Arena	Pirates (Also producer)
1994	Arena	Louise Bourgeois: No Trespassing

Executive producer

- Paris Is Burning (1991)

== Accolades ==
Year	Award	Category	Nominated work	Result
1988	BAFTA TV Award	Best Factual Series	Arena TV series	Nominated
1989	BAFTA TV Award	Best Factual Series	Arena TV series	Won
1990	BAFTA TV Award	Best Factual Series	Arena TV series	Nominated
1991	BAFTA TV Award	Best Factual Series	Arena TV series	Nominated
1992	BAFTA TV Award	Best Factual Series	Arena TV series	Nominated
1981	Chicago International Film Festival Gold Hugo	Best Short Film	The Errand	Nominated
1995	BFI London Film Festival	Audience Award	Stonewall	Won
1996	Frameline Film Festival	Audience Award	Stonewall	Won

Nigel Finch's death was commemorated in the ending title of the opera-film "Dido and Aeneas" (1995) directed by Peter Maniura (conducted by Richard Hickox. See the corresponding entry in Dido and Aeneas discography).
