= Gloria D. Miklowitz =

American novelist

- Born: May 18, 1927; New York City, U.S.
- Died: January 20, 2015 (aged 87); California, U.S.
- Education: University of Michigan
- Occupations: Writer, novelist
- Writing career
- Language: English
- Genres: Fiction, non-fiction

Gloria D. Miklowitz (May 18, 1927, in New York City – January 20, 2015, in Pasadena, California) was an American author of more than 60 fiction and non-fiction books for young adults. Her books have won national and international awards and deal with important issues such as nuclear war, racial injustice, steroid abuse, date violence and militia involvement.

== Early life ==
Miklowitz was born in New York and wrote her first story "My Brother Goo Goo" in third grade. Miklowitz graduated from the University of Michigan in 1948 with a degree in English. She worked at Bantam Books in New York briefly and then worked at the U.S. Naval Ordnance Test Station near Pasadena, California after moving there with her husband in 1951.

== Career ==
Miklowitz was the author of more than 60 fiction and nonfiction books for children and young adults. Her books have won national and international awards and deal with important issues such as nuclear war, racial injustice, steroid abuse, date violence and most recently militia involvement. Three of her novels were made into award-winning television specials, including one which won the Emmy for "Best Children’s Special" in 1986 (The War Between the Classes). A frequent speaker at schools, Gloria has also taken part in conferences in the United States, South Africa and Sweden.

=== Series ===
After the Bomb

- After the Bomb (1984)
- Week One (1987)

=== Novels ===
- The Marshmallow Caper (1971)
- Sad Song, Happy Song (1973)
- Turning Off (1973)
- Time to Hurt, a Time to Heal (1976)
- Earthquake! (1977)
- Paramedic Emergency! (1977)
- Unwed Mother (1977)
- Save That Raccoon (1978)
- Did You Hear What Happened to Andrea? (1979)
- The Love Bombers (1980)
- Close to the Edge (1983)
- Carrie Loves Superman (1983)
- The Day the Senior Class Got Married: A Novel (1983)
- Runaway (1984)
- The War Between the Classes (1985)
- Love Story Take Three (1986)
- Secrets Not Meant to Be Kept (1987)
- Good-Bye Tomorrow (1987)
- Emerson High Vigilantes (1988)
- Anything to Win (1989)
- Standing Tall, Looking Good (1990)
- Desperate Pursuit (1992)
- The Killing Boy (1993)
- Past Forgiving (1995)
- Camouflage (1998)
- Masada: The Last Fortress (1998)
- Secrets in the House of Delgado (2001)
- The Enemy Has a Face (2003)

=== Collections ===
- Ghastly Ghostly Riddles (1977)

=== Non-fiction ===
- Harry Truman (1975)
- Nadia Comaneci (1977)
- Natalie Dunn: World Roller Skating Champion (1979)
- Movie Stunts and the People Who Do Them (1980)
- The Young Tycoons: Ten Success Stories (1981) (with Madeleine Yates)

== Family ==
She married Julius Miklowitz in 1948. She had two children- who are both college professors. All four of the Miklowitz's are published authors.
