= Anson Williams =

American actor (b. 1949)

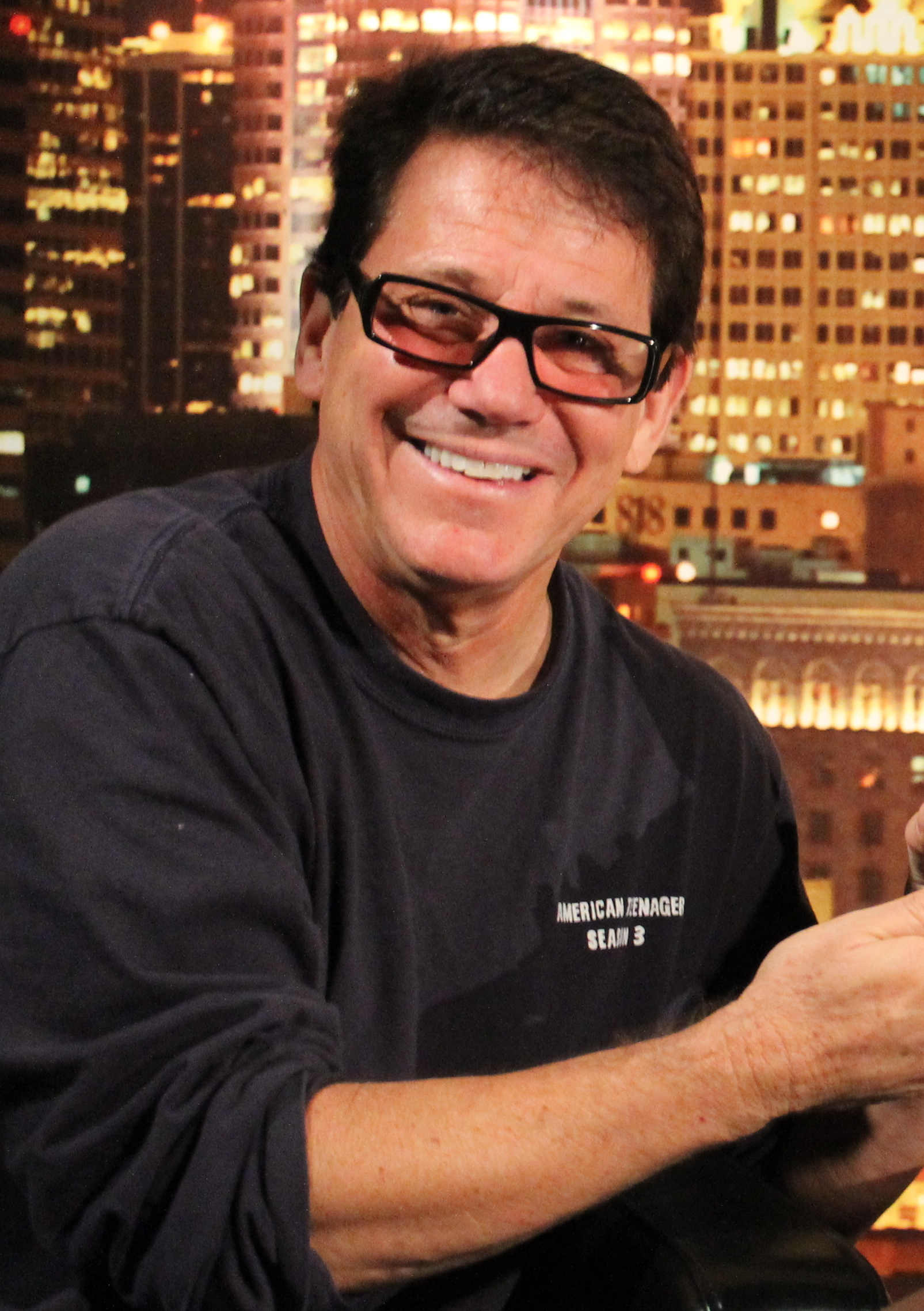
- Williams in 2011
- Born: Anson William Heimlich; September 25, 1949 (age 77); Los Angeles, California, U.S.
- Education: Burbank High School
- Occupations: Actor; singer; television director
- Years active: 1971–present
- Known for: Happy Days; The Secret Life of the American Teenager; Sabrina the Teenage Witch; Melrose Place; Beverly Hills, 90210
- Spouses: Lorrie Mahaffey (m. 1978; div. 1986); Jackie Gerken (m. 1988; div. 2020); Sharon MaHarry (m. 2023)

Anson Williams (born Anson William Heimlich; September 25, 1949) is an American actor. He is best known for his role as gullible, well-intentioned singer Warren "Potsie" Weber on the television series Happy Days (1974–1984), a role for which he was nominated for the Golden Globe Award for Best Supporting Actor – Series, Miniseries or Television Film.

Williams has since become a prominent television director, working on programs such as Melrose Place (1992–1999), Beverly Hills, 90210 (1990–2000), Sabrina the Teenage Witch (1996–2003), Lizzie McGuire (2001–2004), and The Secret Life of the American Teenager (2008–2013).

== Early life ==
Williams was born Anson William Heimlich to a Jewish family. His father, Haskell Heimlich, legally changed the spelling of the family name to "Heimlick", unlike Williams's father's cousin, Dr. Henry Heimlich, namesake of the Heimlich maneuver for treating choking victims. Williams lived in Burbank, California and attended Burbank High School, where he was captain of the track team and acted in multiple school productions.

== Career ==
In 1971, Williams appeared in the Sherman Brothers' original musical, Victory Canteen, at the Ivar Theater in Los Angeles. That year he also appeared with John Amos in a commercial for McDonald's.

In 1972, Williams portrayed Potsie Weber in a segment of the comedy-anthology series Love, American Style titled "Love and the Happy Days", which also introduced Richie Cunningham (Ron Howard), Richie's mother Marion (Marion Ross), and other characters who were spun off into the television series Happy Days. (Only Williams, Howard, and Ross reprised their roles). The new series' first season, during which Williams received second billing after Howard, was centered mainly on Richie and Potsie. Eventually, as breakout character Arthur "Fonzie" Fonzarelli (Henry Winkler) and Richie's mother, father, and sister became more popular, Potsie was joined by Ralph Malph (Don Most, who was merely a side character in season one), and Potsie and Ralph became inseparable.

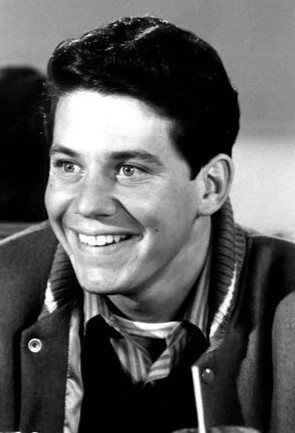
Williams as Potsie Weber in 1974

Unlike Howard and Most, Williams was one of the few to remain through the entire run of the series, although his appearances became less frequent in later seasons. In some episodes, Richie, Potsie, and Ralph formed a band combo that performed at Arnold's Drive-In and other places. As Potsie, Williams actually sang lead vocals for the group. Williams's first wife, Lorrie Mahaffey, portrayed Potsie's girlfriend, Jennifer, in later seasons.

In 1977, during his run on "Happy Days" Williams recorded and released a single, "Deeply" which peaked at #93 on the Hot 100.

After Happy Days, Williams began a much more prolific career as a television director and producer. He served as producer for the 1980 TV movie Skyward, directed by his Happy Days co-star Ron Howard and starring screen icon Bette Davis. Williams went on to direct various short programs for adolescent-age children, including afterschool specials "No Greater Gift" (1985) and "The Drug Knot" (1986), and TV-movie Lone Star Kid (1986). He has gone on to direct many episodes for a variety of television series, including The Pretender, Beverly Hills, 90210, Melrose Place, seaQuest 2032, Star Trek: Deep Space Nine, Star Trek: Voyager, Xena: Warrior Princess, Hercules: The Legendary Journeys, The Secret Life of the American Teenager, Sabrina the Teenage Witch and Charmed. He also directed several episodes of the TV series 7th Heaven.

Despite his success as a director and producer, Williams has occasionally returned to his work on Happy Days in retrospective ways. He played himself in a 1996 Happy Days-themed Boy Meets World episode (which also featured former castmates Tom Bosley and Pat Morita). While directing a 2003 episode of Sabrina the Teenage Witch titled "Sabrina in Wonderland", he appeared as Potsie in a fantasy sequence. He also joined his fellow Happy Days cast members for two reunion specials: The Happy Days Reunion Special (1992) and Happy Days: 30th Anniversary Reunion (2005).

Williams initially objected to footage of Potsie appearing in Weezer's 1994 music video for "Buddy Holly", which is set in Arnold's Drive-In from Happy Days, but he later relented.

Williams is also a businessman. In 1987, he and fellow Happy Days cast member Al Molinaro opened a chain of diners called Big Al's; however the business lasted only a short time. He founded Starmaker Products, a cosmetics company, and was a featured speaker at the U.S. Patent and Trademark Office's National Trademark Expo in 2008, where he discussed the importance of registered trademarks for small businesses and signed autographs for Happy Days fans. Williams is the author of Singing to a Bulldog: From Happy Days to Hollywood Director, and the Unlikely Mentor Who Got Me There.

As of July 2023, Williams and his wife, memoirist Sharon MaHarry, who had married in May, were collaborating on a one woman stage play based on her book, Crazy Mama: A Memoir of Love and Madness, which depicts a character growing up with a mother who has struggled with mental illness, which won the 2014 Southwest Writers Competition and Santa Barbara Writers Conference Fiction Award.

== Personal life ==
Williams' first wife was Lorrie Mahaffey, whom he met on the set of Happy Days. They were divorced in 1986, and had one daughter. Williams then married Jackie Gerkin. He filed for divorce in 2019, but later filed a motion to have that previous filing dismissed in October of that year. He then filed again in 2020. They have four children.

Around 2010, Williams met memoirist and real estate broker Sharon MaHarry, when she sold him his house in Ojai, California. Williams also helped her regain the ability to walk as she recovered from a serious back injury, and as she mourned the loss of her husband of 35 years to cancer. They subsequently began a relationship, which Williams characterized by saying, "the first few months of the relationship was healing." MaHarry commented that the relationship "first healed a body then a heart." They eventually moved into a home in Ojai, California. On May 6, 2023, the couple married in their backyard in what they called a "very untraditional" ceremony. Williams' Happy Days co-star Don Most served as best man. Commenting on getting married at age 73, Williams said, "At this age, to be able to find that kind of full connection for the first time, and what that means — it's a miracle. I would trade my stardom, notoriety, all that bologna for Sharon in a minute. There's no age limit on being loved. There's no age limit on living life fully."

Williams was diagnosed with colon cancer in December 2016 and had two surgeries. He spent three weeks in the hospital but made a full recovery.

=== Politics ===
On July 7, 2022, Williams announced that he would be running for mayor of Ojai, California. He lost to incumbent mayor Betsey Stix by 42 votes, with Williams receiving 1,781 votes to Stix’s 1,823.

=== Legal issues ===
On April 19, 2011, Williams and four of his Happy Days co-stars, Erin Moran, Don Most, Marion Ross, and the estate of Tom Bosley, who died in 2010, filed a $10 million breach-of-contract lawsuit against CBS, which owns the show, claiming they had not been paid for merchandising revenues owed under their contracts. The cast members claimed they had not received revenues from show-related items, including comic books, T-shirts, scrapbooks, trading cards, games, lunch boxes, dolls, toy cars, magnets, greeting cards, and DVDs, where their images appeared on the box covers. Under their contracts, they were supposed to be paid 5% from the net proceeds of merchandising if their sole images were used, and half that amount if they were in a group. CBS said it owed the actors $8,500 and $9,000 each, most of it from slot machine revenues, but the group said they were owed millions. The lawsuit was initiated after Ross was informed by a friend playing slots at a casino of a Happy Days machine on which players win the jackpot when five Marion Rosses are rolled.

In October 2011, a judge rejected the group's fraud claim. On June 5, 2012, a judge denied a motion filed by CBS to have the case thrown out, which meant it would go to trial on July 17 if the parties did not reach a settlement by then. In July 2012, the actors settled their lawsuit with CBS. Each received a payment of $65,000 and a promise by CBS to continue honoring the terms of their contracts. Williams said, "I'm very satisfied with the settlement. And that's all I can say."

== Filmography ==
=== Actor ===
Year	Title	Role	Notes
1971	The Money Tree	Jerry	Credited as "William Heimlick"
1971	Owen Marshall, Counselor at Law	Steve Baggot	Episode: "Eulogy for a Wide Receiver"
1972	Love, American Style	Potsie Weber	Episode: "Love and the Happy Days" (pilot for Happy Days)
1972	The Paul Lynde Show	Jimmy	Episode: "Whiz Kid Sizzles as Quiz Fizzles"
1973	Bridget Loves Bernie	Young Man	Episode: "Life Begins at 65"
1973	Marcus Welby, M.D.		Episode: "The Panic Path"
1973	Lisa, Bright and Dark	Brian Morris	TV movie
1974–1984	Happy Days	Potsie Weber	Main cast (219 episodes)
1976	Laverne & Shirley	Potsie Weber	Episode: "Excuse Me, May I Cut In?"
1977	The Love Boat	Sean McGlynn	Episode: "The Old Man and the Runaway/The Painters/A Fine Romance"
1978	The Hanna-Barbera Happy Hour	Himself (Guest Star)	Episode #1.2
1978	Greatest Heroes of the Bible	Nabar	Episode: "The Ten Commandments"
1983	Fantasy Island	Dan O'Dwyer	Episode: "The Songwriter/Queen of the Soaps"
1984	I Married a Centerfold	Nick Bellows	TV movie
1992	The Happy Days Reunion Special	Himself	TV special
1995	Fudge	Waiter	Episode: "No Exit"
1996	Boy Meets World	Himself	Episode: "I Was a Teenage Spy"
2000	Baywatch	Councilman McKenna	Episodes: "Soul Survivor", "Dream Girl"
2002	Son of the Beach	Warden Jack Beatty	Episode: "Jailhouse Notch: Part 2"
2003	Sabrina the Teenage Witch	Potsie Weber	Episode: "Sabrina in Wonderland"
2005	Happy Days: 30th Anniversary Reunion	Himself	TV special
2016	The Odd Couple	Clayton	Episode: "Taffy Days"

=== Director ===
Year	Title	Notes
1985	ABC Afterschool Special	Episode: "No Greater Gift"
1986	WonderWorks	Episode: "Lone Star Kid"
1986	CBS Schoolbreak Special	Episode: "The Drug Knot"
1987	L.A. Law	Episode: "Brackman Vasektimized"
1987–1988	Hooperman	Episodes: "Baby Talk", "Blaste from the Past", "In Search of Bijoux"
1988	Just the Ten of Us	Episode: "The Merry Mix-Up"
1989	Your Mother Wears Combat Boots	TV movie
1989	Dream Date	TV movie
1989	Little White Lies	TV movie
1990	Glory Days	Episodes: "Blastin' Away the Blues", "Tammy Tell Me True"
1990	A Quiet Little Neighborhood, a Perfect Little Murder	TV movie
1991	All-American Murder	Direct-to-video
1993–1994	Diagnosis: Murder	4 episodes
1994	Heaven Help Us	Episode: "The Wall"
1994–1995	Robin's Hoods	Episodes: "To Heir is Human", "Deja Vu"
1995	Live Shot	4 episodes
1995	Fudge	7 episodes
1995–1996	seaQuest 2032	7 episodes
1996	The Cape	Episodes: "The Need to Know", "Reggie's Wild Ride"
1996	Xena: Warrior Princess	Episode: "Remember Nothing"
1996	Hercules: The Legendary Journeys	Episodes: "King for a Day", "Mummy Dearest"
1996–1999	Melrose Place	9 episodes
1996–2000	Beverly Hills, 90210	9 episodes
1997	The Pretender	Episode: "The Better Part of Valor"
1997	Clueless	Episode: "Sharing Cher"
1997–1998	Star Trek: Deep Space Nine	Episodes: "Statistical Probabilities", "It's Only a Paper Moon"
1997–1999	Star Trek: Voyager	4 episodes
1998	Love Boat: The Next Wave	Episodes: "How Long Has Thing Been Going On?", "Reunion"
1998–1999	7th Heaven	Episodes: "Cutters", "Come Drive with Me"
1999	Cousin Skeeter	Episodes: "The Not-So-Great Outdoors", "The Volcano"
1999	The Net	Episode: "Chem Club"
1999–2000	Profiler	Episodes: "Infidelity", "Mea Culpa"
1999–2003	Sabrina the Teenage Witch	10 episodes
2000–2001	Baywatch	6 episodes
2000–2001	Charmed	Episodes: "Awakened", "All Halliwell's Eve", "The Demon Who Came in from the Cold"
2001	Titans	Episode: "She Stoops to Conquer"
2001–2002	The Nightmare Room	Episodes: "Scareful What You Wish For", "My Name is Evil"
2001–2003	Lizzie McGuire	7 episodes
2002	Body & Soul	Episode: "Running Home"
2006	Sons & Daughters	Episode: "Surprise Party"
2008–2013	The Secret Life of the American Teenager	31 episodes

== Awards and nominations ==
Year	Association	Category	Nominated work	Result
1983	Golden Globe Award	Golden Globe Award for Best Supporting Actor - Series, Miniseries or Television Film	Warren "Potsie" Weber in Happy Days	Nominated
