= Unwed Mother (novel) =

1977 book by Gloria D. Miklowitz

- First edition
- Author: Gloria D. Miklowitz
- Publisher: Tempo Books
- Publication date: 1977
- Publication place: United States
- Media type: Print
- ISBN: 0-448-13533-7

Unwed Mother is a novel by Gloria D. Miklowitz, first published in 1977 by Tempo Books. It was reprinted in 1985. The story deals with a fourteen-year-old girl's pregnancy and her relationship with her baby's father.

== Plot ==
Kathy Sellers is the daughter of lower middle-class parents, living in Los Angeles, California. Her mother Helen is on her fourth marriage to Mike, an unemployed man who uses his back as an excuse to avoid work, and living with them are Kathy's 16-year-old twin sisters, Mona and Dona.

After a sexual encounter with her 18-year-old boyfriend Guy, Kathy learns she is pregnant. She is sent to live at St. Anne's, a home for unwed mothers until her delivery, which happens not long after her fifteenth birthday. After he initially reacts with outrage, she does extract a promise from Guy (who enters the Army) that he will send for her once he gets settled. Despite her regular series of letters to Guy in the military, he doesn't reciprocate. Thus, that day never comes for Kathy.

She gives birth to a baby boy whom she names John. She initially decides to give John up for adoption, but changes her mind and tells Miss Ambrose, her social worker, that she wants to try to raise her baby on her own, after Helen tells her she and the family will help raise him. She is given an allotment of food stamps and welfare money, which Helen decides to use as a vehicle to move the family into a larger apartment.

Within a few short months, Kathy begins to mature as a mother, wanting more for her child, and knowing that living with her parents and sisters isn't going to make that possible. She begins to explore options of moving into a place of her own, which doesn't sit well with Mike and Helen, who depend on her welfare money to pay for the bigger apartment.

She makes friends with Linda and Sue, two other girls in a teen mother program to move into a rented house with their children in a middle-class family-type neighborhood. She also makes friends with her neighbor Jane, a married woman about ten years her senior with a house, her fireman husband Allen, and their young daughter Wendy. Kathy sees Jane's family as perfect and wants to aspire to that level, but isn't sure how.

However, Kathy's dreams of sharing responsibilities with her roommates as a collective effort to rise above their circumstances are quashed when Linda throws a party with booze found in a baby bottle. After a near-violent confrontation, Kathy learns that her roommates (mostly Linda) are only interested in having a place of their own so they can continue their reckless behavior. Feeling trapped again, with her illusion of cooperative motherhood shattered, Kathy begins having second thoughts about her role as a mother.

Following the earlier confrontation, Kathy takes her now-four-month-old son outside in their backyard and sees Allen, Jane and Wendy in their own backyard, enjoying their time as a family. Kathy decides that despite her best efforts, she ultimately has to do right by John. She calls Miss Ambrose and tells her that she's reconsidered her decision to have John put up for adoption. Most people close to Kathy condemn her decision, but she finds a friend in Jane, who offers to help her on her road to building a better life for herself if she promises to keep in touch. Kathy happily agrees.

Miss Ambrose tracks down Guy in the Army and gets his permission to allow the adoption. He apologizes to Kathy through Miss Ambrose for running out on her.

At the end of the story, Kathy appears to get cold feet about the adoption, but it is implied that she goes through with it.
