= Dave Toma =

American police officer (born 1933)

David Toma
- Born: 1933 (age 92–93); Newark, New Jersey
- Education: West Side High School
- Known for: Undercover police work, "Toma" TV series
- Police career
- Department: Newark Police Department
- Service years: 21 years
- Status: Retired
- Other work: Lecturer on drug and alcohol abuse

David Toma (born 1933) is a United States former police officer whose undercover work and battles with his superiors became the basis of the television series Toma, which ran on the ABC network from 1973 to 1974.

== Biography ==
Born and raised in Newark, New Jersey as the youngest of 12 children, Toma graduated from West Side High School.

In 1956, after serving 3 years in the USMC as a drill instructor and following a brief career as a professional baseball player, Toma joined the Newark Police Department, staying on for 21 years. Initially a patrol officer, Toma moved up to narcotics detective; he was frustrated with minor criminals being frequently arrested, while the big-time criminals who ran the illegal operations were unaffected. Toma started going undercover, often using disguises, in order to better observe major-league crooks. While higher-ups in the department objected to his techniques, he succeeded in amassing a significant record of arrests. He wrote a book based on his 20 years of experiences as a police officer but was unsuccessful in finding a publisher for the book. His demonstration of quick-change disguises on The Mike Douglas Show led to his book being picked up and the development of a television series based on his exploits. Toma ran on ABC from 1973 to 1974, with Tony Musante playing Toma. In his review of the show in The New York Times, John J. O'Connor described Toma's groundbreaking role as "a loner, openly distrustful of the competence and honesty of his fellow police officers," Eventually, Musante and others involved with Toma thought that the series had become too formula-based; the show was canceled and eventually resurrected in part as Baretta, which ran from 1975 to 1978, with Robert Blake playing the title character.

In 1977, producer Bob Roberts and Trans World Attractions developed a film based on his career, with a screenplay written by Frank Scioscia.

For decades after retiring from the police department, Toma lectured high school and college students about the dangers of alcohol and other drugs. He focused on his own personal experiences as a drug addict, which began after his 5-year-old son David Junior died in a choking accident; doctors had prescribed tranquilizers to help Toma cope with his son's death. To date he has lectured thousands of students and continues his efforts to this day.

Toma's books include Toma: The Compassionate Cop, Airport Affair and Turning Your Life Around: David Toma's Guide for Teenagers.

He and his wife Pat are residents of Clark, New Jersey. They have four children: son Jimmy; daughters Patricia Anne, Donna, and Janice.
