= Omnibus (British TV programme) =

British documentary series

- Genre: Documentary
- Presented by: Humphrey Burton; Barry Norman
- Country of origin: United Kingdom
- Original language: English

Production
- Running time: 43 minutes

Original release
- Network: BBC One (1967–2001); BBC Two (2001–2003)
- Release: 13 October 1967 – 8 January 2003

Omnibus is a British documentary series broadcast mainly on BBC One. The programme was the successor to the arts-based series Monitor. It ran from 1967 until 2003, usually being transmitted on Sunday evenings. During its 35-year history, the programme won 12 British Academy of Film and Television Arts (BAFTA) awards.

== History ==
For one season in 1982, the series was in a magazine format presented by Barry Norman. In 2001, the BBC announced that the programme was being switched to BBC Two, prompting accusations that the corporation was further marginalising its arts programming. BBC controller of arts commissioning Roly Keating defended the move, saying "the documentary strand will be able to tackle a wider range of subjects." Regarded as its "flagship arts programme", Omnibus was one of only two regular arts programmes broadcast by the BBC. In late 2002, the BBC announced that Omnibus would be cancelled the following year, to be replaced by the arts series Imagine, hosted by Alan Yentob.

== Selected list of programmes ==
Among the series' best remembered documentaries are:

- Song of Summer (1968) biographical film by Ken Russell about Frederick Delius and Eric Fenby
- Whistle and I'll Come to You (1968) - Jonathan Miller's adaptation of M.R. James's ghost story, starring Michael Hordern.
- The Garden Beyond (1971), Douglas Eadie's film about the Scots poet William Soutar.
- Cracked Actor (1975), a profile of David Bowie during the peak of his cocaine addiction
- Fear and Loathing on the Road to Hollywood (1978), follows American Gonzo Journalist Hunter S. Thompson and British artist Ralph Steadman on a trip to Hollywood during the development of a film based on Thompson's life and work.
- Rene Magritte (1979), a graduate film by David Wheatley.
- Leonard Bernstein's West Side Story (1984), a documentary about a studio recording of Leonard Bernstein conducting his own music from West Side Story. Bernstein had not previously conducted the 1957 musical. The episode won the Robert Flaherty Award for the best television documentary in 1986.
- Anna Benson-Gyles Madonna: Behind the American dream (1990), a film produced by Nadia Hagger. 7.7 million people watched this episode, which was slightly higher that the average audience of 3.1 million.
- Van Gogh (1991)
- Profile of British film director Ridley Scott (1992)
- A two-hour career overview of director Jean Renoir (1995)
- A documentary about The K Foundation's various art projects (1995).

== See also ==
- Omnibus (American TV programme)
