= Felony murder and the death penalty in the United States =

Most jurisdictions in the United States of America maintain the felony murder rule. In essence, the felony murder rule states that when an offender kills (regardless of intent to kill) in the commission of a dangerous or enumerated crime (called a felony in some jurisdictions), the offender, and also the offender's accomplices or co-conspirators, may be found guilty of murder. It means that the common law malice required for murder is "implied as a matter of law for homicides arising from felonies." It is a widely criticized feature of American criminal law. Initially, it was widely believed by scholars that the felony murder rule had originated in England. However, more recent scholarship has argued that it likely originated in the United States, independently of England. Its historic roots have been called "deep but terribly obscure".

There are two forms of the felony murder doctrine practiced in the United States. The first uses a "dangerous felony" approach, which relies upon felonies which are thought to be dangerous listed in the felony-murder statute and if the defendant commits one of those felonies, it triggers the rule. The other form requires that the defendant commit an act clearly dangerous to human life while committing a felony and does not rely on any enumerated felonies in a statute. Further, whether the murder is considered first or second degree murder depends on the jurisdiction.

The Supreme Court of the United States has held that the Eighth Amendment to the United States Constitution does not prohibit imposing the death penalty for felony murder. The Supreme Court has created a two-part test to determine when the death penalty is an appropriate punishment for felony murder. Under Enmund v. Florida, the death penalty may not be imposed on someone who did not kill, attempt to kill, or intend that a killing take place. However, under Tison v. Arizona, the death penalty may be imposed on someone who was a major participant in the underlying felony and acted with reckless indifference to human life. In Kennedy v. Louisiana, 554 U.S. 407 (2008), the Court added with respect to the defendants in Tison it "allowed the defendants’ death sentences to stand where they did not themselves kill the victims but their involvement in the events leading up to the murders was active, recklessly indifferent, and substantial."

== Application and limitations of the rule ==
The law of felony-murder in the United States varies substantially jurisdiction to jurisdiction. It has been abolished by Hawaii, Kentucky, and Michigan. Most states limit the rule to deaths caused negligently during the commission of a felony. While California uses the enumerated felonies approach, Texas requires that the defendant committed an act clearly dangerous to human life during the commission of a felony, and Alabama uses both approaches. All jurisdictions have limited the application of the felony murder rule to those who have committed or attempted certain felonies. The traditional predicate felonies (felonies which are either enumerated or considered "inherently dangerous") are "burglary, arson, robbery, rape, and kidnapping" (informally "BARRK crimes").

=== Inherently dangerous felony limitation ===
The inherently dangerous felony approach is the most popular limitation on the rule. It is further divided into two subtypes. The majority of jurisdictions using this limitation look at whether the felony was inherently dangerous by looking at the facts of the case before the court, i.e. "based on the manner in which the felony was committed." The abstract approach which looks at the elements of the predicate felony in the abstract and not the particular facts of the case before the court is the minority approach. In California, examples of felonies that have been identified as "inherently dangerous" in the abstract include kidnapping and arson of a motor vehicle. While felonies that have not been found to be inherently dangerous in the abstract include prison escape and grand theft.

Felonies that endanger the physical health of the victim are excluded from being a predicate felonies in jurisdictions that follow the inherently dangerous felony approach under the merger limitation. It is reasoned that such felonies (like assault) have been designated as a lesser form of homicide by state legislatures, and therefore most jurisdictions punish intentional killings as voluntary manslaughter "if committed with provocation or extreme emotional disturbance" because otherwise it would invalidate the legislature's choice of punishment. An example of the merger doctrine in most jurisdictions is this: A person who commits burglary with the intent to steal inside the dwelling and who, during this process, comes across and murders the homeowner will be found guilty under the felony murder rule. However, someone who commits burglary with the intent to kill another inside the dwelling does not fall under the felony murder rule as the felony is merged.

=== Complicity Doctrine ===
Cofelons are individuals who commit a felony together, such as armed robbery. Under the complicity doctrine, an individual who is a cofelon to a felon who accidentally kills someone during an armed robbery, is also liable for that murder.

=== Jurisdiction by jurisdiction ===
- Alabama
- Alaska
- Arizona
- Arkansas
- California (only if the deceased is a peace officer or the defendant operated with reckless indifference to human life and was a major participant)
- Colorado
- Connecticut
- Delaware
- Florida
- Georgia
- Hawaii (abolished)
- Idaho
- Illinois
- Indiana
- Iowa
- Kansas
- Kentucky (abolished)
- Louisiana
- Maine
- Maryland
- Massachusetts
- Michigan (abolished)
- Minnesota
- Mississippi
- Missouri
- Montana
- Nebraska
- Nevada
- New Hampshire
- New Jersey (follows Model Penal Code)
- New Mexico
- New York
- North Carolina
- North Dakota
- Ohio
- Oklahoma
- Oregon
- Pennsylvania
- Rhode Island
- South Carolina
- South Dakota
- Tennessee
- Texas
- Utah
- Vermont
- Virginia
- Washington
- West Virginia
- Wisconsin
- Wyoming
- District of Columbia
- Federal

== Supreme Court jurisprudence ==
=== Proportionality and felony murder ===
The Court's proportionality principle has three components, two of which are objective and one of which is subjective. The objective evidence the Court looks for is the legislative judgment of the states and the behavior of sentencing juries; the subjective evidence the Court looks for is the extent to which a particular death penalty serves the goals of retribution and deterrence. Examining nearly the same question a mere five years apart, the Court came to two different conclusions—that the Eighth Amendment allows the death penalty for felony murder in some cases but not others, and that the dividing line is the situation presented by Tison.

==== Legislative judgments of the states ====
In Coker v. Georgia, the Court had rejected the death penalty for rape because only one state—Georgia—allowed that punishment. Accordingly, the task for the Court was to count the number of states that allowed the death penalty for felony murder to see if the death penalty was a comparatively rare sanction for that crime.

This enumeration was not as simple as it might seem at first. In 1982, 36 states authorized the death penalty. In four, felony murder was not a capital crime. In 11 others, proof of some culpable mental state was an element of capital murder. In 13 states, aggravating circumstances above and beyond the fact of the murder itself were required before imposing the death penalty. This left eight states—out of 36—allowed the death penalty for merely participating in a felony in which a murder was committed. The Court concluded that this evidence "weighs on the side of rejecting capital punishment for the crime at issue"—felony murder for a minor participant who did not actually kill anyone or intend to kill anyone.

By 1987, the counting of the states had shifted. In response to Enmund, four states had modified their capital punishment statutes to reject the death penalty for murder committed in the course of a felony when the participant exhibited reckless indifference to human life. Nevertheless, the Court observed in Tison that of the states that authorized the death penalty for felony murder, only 11 forbade it even for major participants in the felony who exhibited reckless indifference to human life. By the time of Tison, some state supreme courts had expressly interpreted Enmund to allow the death penalty in these cases.

==== Sentencing decisions of juries ====
"The jury... is a significant and reliable objective index of contemporary values because it is so directly involved" in the criminal justice system. In Enmund the Court recited that of 362 appellate decisions since 1954, only 6 involved a death sentence for a nontriggerman convicted of felony murder, and all 6 executions took place in 1955. This was comparatively rarer than death sentences for rape, of which there had been 72 between 1955 and 1977. Also, as of October 1, 1981, there were 796 people on death row in the United States, of whom only 3 had been sentenced to death absent a finding that the defendant had actually killed someone or intended that a killing take place. In Tison, however, the fact that since Enmund, state appellate courts continued to review and approve death sentences for defendants convicted of felony murder who were major participants in the underlying felony and had exhibited extreme indifference to human life persuaded the Court that juries still considered the death penalty an appropriate punishment for at least some defendants convicted of felony murder.

==== Retribution and deterrence ====
Faced with the objective evidence suggesting that legislatures and sentencing juries did not uniformly reject the death penalty for all defendants convicted of felony murder, the Court had to limit the death penalty to a discrete and narrow category of felony murder defendants based on its estimation of which category would best effectuate the goals of retribution and deterrence. The Enmund Court stressed that the propriety of the death penalty must be measured in light of Enmund's own conduct. The Tison Court added that historically, the individualized determination incorporates an assessment of the mental state with which the defendant commits a crime, because a more culpable mental state merits a more severe punishment. In Woodson v. North Carolina, the Court had struck down a mandatory death penalty statute because it failed to provide for individualized consideration at sentencing. The rule fashioned by Enmund and Tison accommodated this concern by ensuring that only felony murder defendants who had a sufficiently culpable mental state received the death penalty.

In an earlier case the Court had remarked that "capital punishment can serve as a deterrent only when murder is the result of premeditation and deliberation." The Tison rule retreats from this belief with its implicit assessment that the death penalty can deter even those who act recklessly. "A narrow focus on the question of whether or not a given defendant intended to kill... is a highly unsatisfactory means of definitively distinguishing the most culpable and dangerous of murderers." In the Court's estimation, "reckless indifference to the value of human life may be every bit as shocking to the moral sense as an intent to kill." Imposing the death penalty on a major participant in a felony who exhibits reckless indifference to human life is justified because of the interest in expressing retribution; imposing it on someone who intends to kill serves deterrence.

=== Justice Brennan on those who do not intend to kill ===
Justice William J. Brennan Jr. concurred in the result in Enmund but dissented in Tison because he believed that there was a measurable difference between one who acts intentionally and one who acts merely recklessly. Both cases had one crucial fact in common—neither Enmund nor the Tison brothers had committed an act of murder. Enmund had been in the getaway car; the Tison brothers had been fetching a jug of water for the Lyon family. If the death penalty is to be reserved for the worst murderers, Brennan believed in maintaining the distinction between an intentional act and a reckless one. "It is precisely in this context -- where the defendant has not killed -- that a finding that he or she nevertheless intended to kill seems indispensable to establishing capital culpability." Yet the law had traditionally regarded reckless behavior to be less blameworthy than intentional behavior, because it recognizes the "freedom of the human will and a consequent ability and duty of the normal individual to choose between good and evil." Because Enmund had not intended to kill the Kerseys, the Court had struck down his death sentence as not measurably contributing to either the goal of retribution or of deterrence. For Brennan, then, it was incongruous for the Court to hold in Tison that putting someone to death who had acted recklessly would.

Brennan also faulted the Court for ignoring the states that had abolished the death penalty altogether when counting the states that authorized the death penalty for felony murder. "It is critical to examine not simply those jurisdictions that authorize the death penalty in a given circumstance, but those that actually impose it." None of the 65 executions that had taken place after Enmund were carried out on a felony murderer who had not killed or intended to kill (as determined by a jury).

== Policy arguments ==
The felony murder rule is a popular topic of discussion in criminal law scholarship. It is often criticized by scholars for disconnecting liability from culpability. David Crump, a legal scholar, argued that the felony murder rule is misunderstood, that unlike the popular perception, no American jurisdictions maintains a rule that is essentially "felony plus death automatically equals murder, without important limits. Scholars typically rationalize the felony-murder rule in four different ways: deterrence, transferred intent, retribution, and general culpability.

There are two reasons that the felony-murder rule is argued to deter criminals. The first is that it deters negligent killings during the commission of felonies. The argument goes that cofelons will dissuade their criminal coconspirators from using violence because they too would be liable for any violence that occurs. The second reason argued is that it deters the commission of felonies altogether, the belief being that the rule adds to the risk of committing a felony in general. Opponents of the deterrence rationale argue that it is impossible to deter an unintended act, that the cofelons are likely to be unaware of the rule, and that there is no statistical evidence of deterrence.

The retributivist rationale is that a killing occurring during the commission of a felony is a strict liability offense. The reasoning behind this rationale is that a felon bears responsibility for the harmful result arising from their criminal activity regardless of their intent. Opponents of the retributivist rationale argue that it is "primitive" and "simple", that it lacks nuance in terms of the felon's culpability and that it unjustifiably removes the mens rea element of the crime in question. Another retributivist argument in favor comes from Crump, who states that societal outrage at the offense is a justification for the rule. Crump argues that the rule distinguishes crimes that cause human death thereby reinforcing the "reverence for human life." He also argues that the condemnation represents society's "expression of solidarity with the victim's of the crime" which is useful because it reaffirms to the victim's family "the kinship society as a whole" feels for them.
