= Murder of Jimmy Farris =

On May 22, 1995, 16-year-old Jimmy Farris, the son of a Los Angeles Police Department officer, was stabbed to death. Farris and his friend, Michael McLoren, were next to a clubhouse-type fort in McLoren's backyard. Four acquaintances of Farris and McLoren (Micah Holland, Jason Holland, Tony Miliotti, and Brandon Hein) jumped the chainlink fence and approached the fort. There was a fight inside the fort. Farris and McLoren went into the house, bleeding from stab wounds, while the other four climbed back over the fence and left. Farris died before paramedics arrived. McLoren was airlifted to UCLA Medical Center.

The Holland brothers, Miliotti, and Hein were charged with felony murder, among other charges. A fifth male, Christopher Velardo, who remained outside the yard in the truck throughout the incident, was charged with voluntary manslaughter and conspiracy to commit robbery. Velardo pled guilty to the charges, receiving a sentence of 11 years. The other four were found guilty and received lengthy sentences.

The case received widespread media attention. Public opinion was divided on the application of the felony murder rule in this case and the lengthy sentences given to the defendants.

== Description of the fight ==
The following description of the fight and stabbing is from the "Summary of Facts and Proceedings" in the January 29, 2001 California Court of Appeal findings. Note that the term "appellants" excludes Christopher Velardo, 17, owner of the pickup truck, who remained in the truck throughout the incident and was tried separately.

At approximately 7:00 p.m. McLoren and Farris were in the McLoren backyard in the immediate vicinity of the fort. Without permission or invitation, all appellants as a group entered the McLoren backyard by hopping over a fence. Micah Holland (Micah) and Miliotti entered first. Jason and Hein followed approximately ten to fifteen feet behind Micah and Miliotti. Micah immediately entered the fort and Miliotti stood in the doorway. Appellants did not have permission or invitation to enter the fort. There had not been prior arrangement for the sale of marijuana between McLoren and appellants.

Appellant Jason was carrying a folding pocketknife. There is no evidence that appellants Micah, Hein, or Miliotti carried weapons or that any of them knew Jason carried a pocketknife.

Appellant Micah unsuccessfully attempted to pull open the locked desk drawer. Next, appellants Micah and Hein, in a threatening manner, shouted words demanding that McLoren turn over the key to the locked desk drawer. Appellant Micah, when threatening McLoren and demanding the key, shouted, "Give me the key fool" and "Give me the key, ese. You want shit with Gumbys, ese?" McLoren refused to relinquish the key.

Appellants Micah, Jason and Hein then verbally and physically assaulted McLoren. The intensity and violence of the battle escalated. McLoren held Micah face down on a bed and elbowed him about the back and neck. Jason attempted to pull McLoren off of Micah. McLoren kicked Jason in the face. McLoren then heard appellant Jason say, "Let's get this fucker." While being held in a headlock, McLoren twice felt sharp, debilitating, pulsating sensations, which later proved to be multiple stab wounds. Jason admitted stabbing McLoren.

After McLoren was stabbed, Farris entered the fort and became involved in the melee. Farris confronted Jason, who turned and, without hesitation, stabbed Farris twice in the torso. Immediately thereafter, McLoren observed Hein beating Farris in the head and face with his fists. Farris did not resist or otherwise defend himself from the blows administered by Hein.

Both McLoren and Farris broke away from the fight and ran to McLoren's house. They each reported to McLoren's mother that "... they (appellants) came to get our stuff ..." and had stabbed them. Mrs. McLoren saw a stab wound in the center of Farris’ chest.

Witnesses observed appellants together leaving the McLoren yard, being met by the Velardo pickup truck and driving away in Velardo's pickup truck. A witness testified that he observed the four appellants on the street as they left the McLoren backyard apparently talking among themselves and smiling.

== Charges ==
Christopher Velardo, 17, who remained outside in the truck throughout the incident, was charged and tried separately.

Micah Holland, 15, Brandon Hein, 17, and Anthony Miliotti, 17, as well as the actual killer Jason Holland, 18, were charged with burglary, attempted robbery, and murder committed during the course of a burglary and an attempted robbery, and with attempted willful, deliberate, premeditated murder of McLoren.

All four were charged with felony murder because the murder was committed during the course of a felony, the alleged attempted robbery of McLoren's marijuana.

California law allows felony murder charges to be "enhanced" by special circumstances if the murder is committed during the commission of certain other crimes, among them robbery and burglary. The special circumstances of robbery and burglary were both alleged in this case. Murders under special circumstances require the imposition of the death penalty or life without possibility of parole.

== Trial ==
The severity of the charges polarized the small town of Agoura Hills and attracted international attention. The case was heard in the Superior Court of Los Angeles County in Malibu, California, with Judge Lawrence Mira presiding.

The issue of the defendants' intent when entering the McLoren property and during the events at the fort was critical and hotly contested throughout the trial. The defendants said they had gone to the fort to buy, not steal, marijuana that day, so there was no burglary or attempted robbery. McLoren, testifying as a prosecution witness under promise of immunity from prosecution on drug charges, said there had been no prior arrangement for the sale of marijuana.

Testimony about the earlier wallet theft was introduced, with Judge Mira instructing the jury that it could be considered only to determine if it tended to show the criminal intent required for the offenses charged later that day. The prosecution said that both incidents were alike, in that they were theft-type offenses involving group action and intimidating conduct by members of the group.

Extensive media coverage before the trial had suggested that the defendants were members of Gumbys, a local street gang. In pre-trial proceedings, Judge Mira found that there was insufficient evidence that the defendants were gang members and excluded any evidence of gang membership. Notwithstanding this ruling, during cross-examination the prosecution twice asked Jason Holland about Gumbys, including asking him if he was a member. Judge Mira instructed the jury to ignore these questions. During closing arguments, the prosecution again strongly suggested the existence of gang activity. These suggestions of gang activity were brought up in the defendants' later appeal as prejudicial misconduct that deprived them of their right to a fair trial.

Jason Holland admitted stabbing both McLoren and Farris.

On May 28, 1996, the jury found the four defendants guilty of burglary, attempted robbery, and murder committed during the course of a burglary and an attempted robbery, that is, felony murder. In addition, Jason Holland was convicted of assault with a deadly weapon. The jury also found the allegations of special circumstances to be true, and found the murder, burglary and attempted robbery to be of the first degree.

== Sentences ==
The four were sentenced to state prison as follows:

- Jason Holland – life without possibility of parole plus eight years.
- Brandon Hein – life without possibility of parole plus four years.
- Tony Miliotti – life without possibility of parole plus four years.
- Micah Holland – 29 years to life.

Christopher Velardo pleaded guilty separately to voluntary manslaughter and conspiracy to commit robbery and was sentenced to eleven years. Velardo was released from prison in 2000.

In October 2019, Hein was granted parole. He was released from prison by summer 2020.

== Supporters ==
The case attracted international attention and support, due largely to media coverage of the charges, the application of the felony murder rule, and the long sentences imposed.

Director William Gazecki made a documentary film called Reckless Indifference about the murder, trial, and resulting prison sentences. In his film, Gazecki argues that the defendants received an unfair trial and overly harsh sentences.

A bill by former California state senator Tom Hayden to revise California's felony murder rule died in the Senate.

Actor Charles Grodin wrote and directed a sympathetic play, The Prosecution of Brandon Hein.

In 2005 Gazecki was a guest speaker at California State University Los Angeles, where his film was shown to Soren Kerk's sociology class with the question in mind, "What is Justice?"

== Detractors ==
Although the crime occurred outside his jurisdiction (in Los Angeles County, not in the city of Los Angeles), Los Angeles police chief Willie Williams wrote to Judge Mira recommending the maximum punishment for all four defendants: life in prison without the possibility of parole.

In an interview with Farris' parents, his mother asks, ”How much is too much time for killing someone? For taking away and changing our lives completely, forever?”

== Controversy ==
Supporters of the defendants as well as opponents of the felony murder rule have expressed various concerns and criticisms.

=== Regarding the charges ===
- According to William Gazecki and other critics, the prosecutor's office was spurred to lay the heaviest possible charges by the victim's father, an LAPD officer; and says that if the victim had not been a police officer's son the felony murder rule would never have been applied. In a CBS 60 Minutes II segment, a spokesman for the defendants' families charges that the boys were punished not for what they did, but for who was killed. The spokesman says, "It's about a police officer's son who died. And the only way they could convict all these kids was use the felony murder rule." James Farris Sr., the victim's father, says "The fact that I'm a policeman has nothing to do with anything. I just happen to be a policeman whose son was murdered. That's it."
- The felony murder rule itself has been criticized as unjust and offensive to the basic notion of fairness, since all participants in the underlying felony are punished equally regardless of their role, or lack of a role, in the murder. Supporters of the rule regard it as an example of strict liability, whereby a person who chooses to commit a crime is considered absolutely responsible for all the possible consequences of that action.
- The application of the felony murder rule in this case was also questioned by those who did not agree that an underlying felony, the attempted robbery of McLoren's marijuana, had actually taken place.

=== Regarding the trial ===
- Critics have accused the Los Angeles district attorney's office of being less interested in justice than in making up for their embarrassing high-visibility loss in the murder trial of O. J. Simpson a few months earlier.
- The fact that the victim's father was an LAPD officer also generated suspicions that the district attorney's office was pressured for convictions, with Farris Sr. supposedly enjoying extraordinary access to authorities and attorneys, and using his influence to gain favors for the prosecution. Farris says in the film he never was present while prosecutors interviewed witnesses, while Deputy District Attorney Jeff Semow says that Farris "may have been present."
- To prove felony murder, the prosecution had to prove that an underlying felony had taken place, the attempted robbery of McLoren's marijuana. On the witness stand as a prosecution witness, McLoren testified that there had been no prior arrangement for the sale of marijuana. Before he testified, the prosecution had given him immunity from prosecution for selling drugs, a fact not known to the jury.
- Extensive pre-trial media coverage available to the pool of potential jurors suggested that the defendants were gang members. Judge Mira found that there was insufficient evidence of gang membership, and ruled that no evidence of this type was allowed in the trial. Notwithstanding this ruling, the prosecution several times asked questions about gang membership or otherwise suggested to the jury the existence of gang activity. After each suggestion, the judge instructed the jury to ignore it, a process likened by some critics to "trying to unring a bell". Interviewed in Reckless Indifference, Harvard law professor Alan Dershowitz says the prosecutors "terrorized" the jury into believing the defendants were violent gang members.

=== Regarding the sentences ===
- The sentences – 29 years to life for Micah Holland, life without possibility of parole for Hein, Miliotti, and Jason Holland – have been widely criticized as out of proportion to the nature of the crimes. Dershowitz calls the sentence "disproportional, outrageous, unconstitutional and immoral."

== Appeals ==
=== State appeals ===
An appeal of the convictions and sentences to the California Court of Appeal for the Second District charged prosecutors with misconduct and presenting inadmissible evidence, including alleging that the defendants belonged to the Gumbys street gang. Among other things, the appeal also alleged that it was improper to present the earlier wallet theft to the jury; that the prosecution engaged in egregious personal attacks on defense counsel; and that the verdicts were inconsistent. It further alleged juror misconduct, judicial bias, and faulty instructions to the jury.

Defending the sentences, Deputy District Attorney Victoria Bedrossian argued that while only Jason Holland wielded the knife, the defendants acted "in concert." "Each appellant was a major participant who acted with reckless indifference to Jimmy Farris' life," Bedrossian said. "The sentences in this case do not offend fundamental notions of human dignity and the penalties in this case should not be changed."

On 29 January 2001 the California Court of Appeal ruled that "In order to warrant reversal, it must be determined that the alleged misconduct has prejudiced appellants’ right to a fair trial. In this case, the evidence against appellants was overwhelming." The Court affirmed the convictions and sentencing of Jason Holland, Brandon Hein and Micah Holland. The special circumstance finding against Anthony Miliotti, who stood and watched, was struck from the record and his crime reduced to second-degree murder, and his case sent back to the trial court for resentencing, resulting in a new sentence of nineteen years to life.

The California Supreme Court denied petitions for review on April 25, 2001.

Hein filed a petition for a writ of certiorari with the United States Supreme Court, which was denied on October 1, 2001.

A petition for a writ of habeas corpus with the California Supreme Court was filed on September 23, 2002, which was summarily denied on May 12, 2004.

=== Federal appeals ===
Following exhaustion of their appeals in state court, Hein, Miliotti, Micah and Jason Holland filed individual Petition for Writ of Habeas Corpus in the United States District Court for the Central District of California in May and July 2004. The petitions raised identical, overlapping, and separate claims: Brady violations, prosecutorial misconduct, ineffective assistance of counsel, improper exclusion or admission of evidence, juror misconduct, judicial misconduct, cruel and unusual punishment, and arbitrary and capricious sentence reduction. On April 3, 2007, the United States magistrate judge assigned to the case filed a joint Report and Recommendation, recommending that the petitions be denied. All four appellants filed objections to the Magistrate's report, but the United States District Judge adopted the Report and Recommendation without modification. Each appellant then requested a Certificate of Appealability to the United States Court of Appeals for the Ninth Circuit, which were all granted in whole or in part by the District Court. On January 17, 2008, the Ninth Circuit Court granted a motion to consolidate the appeals of the four appellants.

On October 7, 2009, the appeals were heard by a three-judge panel of the United States Court of Appeals for the Ninth Circuit. Attorneys for the four alleged false testimony by McLoren and misconduct by the prosecution, including failure to disclose evidence favorable to the defense.

On April 12, 2010, the appeals were denied, with the court acknowledging some instances of prosecutorial misconduct but saying their combined effect, along with the nondisclosure of McLoren's immunity, was not sufficient to render the trial fundamentally unfair.

On May 26, 2010, attorneys for Hein, Miliotti, and Jason Holland filed a "Joint Petition for Rehearing En Banc." Attorneys for Micah Holland filed a separate "Petition for Rehearing En Banc." In the petitions, the attorneys argue that the April 12 opinion by the three-judge panel "conflicts with a well-settled body of law within the Ninth Circuit," and that "En banc review is necessary to secure and maintain the uniformity of this Court's decisions."

On July 16, 2010, the three-judge panel of the Ninth Circuit Court issued an order stating that "The full court has been advised of the petitions for rehearing en banc and no judge has requested a vote on whether to rehear the matter en banc. The petitions for panel rehearing and the petitions for rehearing en banc are denied."

On November 15, 2010, attorneys for the four petitioners filed a petition for a writ of certiorari with the Supreme Court of the United States. The petition was denied on April 18, 2011.

=== Commutation to 29 years to life with the possibility of parole ===
On March 17, 2009, Hein's sentence was commuted by Governor Schwarzenegger, from life without possibility of parole plus four years, to 29 years to life with the possibility of parole. Hein's "Initial Suitability Hearing" is scheduled for October 30, 2019.

=== Current status ===
On September 25, 2020, Brandon Hein's murder sentence was vacated. The Honorable Yvette Verastegui, Superior Court Judge, ordered upon resentencing, “Defendant’s Penal Code Section 1170.95 petition having been granted on today’s date, his murder conviction is vacated.” [Page 1 Court finding of Case SA022108-01]

The board found that Miliotti was "not yet suitable for parole and would pose an unreasonable risk of danger or a threat to public safety if released from prison," and gave him a ten-year denial. However, under Marsy's Law, a life inmate who is denied parole may, in three year intervals, request that his or her hearing be moved to an earlier date. Miliotti filed a petition to advance which was approved and his next hearing was advanced from ten to seven years. His "Subsequent Parole Consideration Hearing" took place on March 8, 2018. The parole board found that, "Mr. Miliotti does not pose an unreasonable risk of danger to society or threat to public safety and is therefore suitable for parole." On December 24, 2018, Governor Edmund G. Brown Jr. commuted Jason Holland's sentence, from life without the possibility of parole plus eight years, to 30 years to life. Micah Holland appeared before the Board of Parole Hearings on March 13, 2019. He was denied parole and given a seven-year denial.

=== Bill under consideration would require re-sentencing ===
As of August 16, 2018, a bill which would reduce the broad scope allowed in charging "special circumstances" had been approved by the California Senate. The bill restricts the charging of special circumstances to only those who actually commit murder or who are directly involved, and would require re-sentencing of offenders such as Hein. Senate Bill 1437 was enacted on September 30, 2018.

== See also ==
- Felony murder and the death penalty
