= Lisl Auman =

American woman controversially convicted of murder

- Born: Lisl Auman; 1976 (age 49–50)
- Known for: Conviction under felony murder rule for murder of Denver police officer

Lisl Auman (born 1976) is an American woman who was convicted of first degree murder and second-degree burglary in connection with the murder of Denver police officer Bruce VanderJagt on November 12, 1997. On the day of her arrest, Auman and several acquaintances traveled to her former boarding house in Pine to retrieve items from her and her former boyfriend's apartments. Auman departed as a passenger in a car driven by Matthaeus Jaehnig; soon after, other boarding house residents reported the event as a suspected burglary. After multiple police chases, Denver police discovered Auman and Jaehnig in a condominium's parking lot. Auman was immediately arrested, handcuffed, and placed in an officer's car. Jaehnig escaped arrest, hiding in a dead-end stairwell. He was soon discovered by officer VanderJagt, whom Jaehnig then fatally shot with a rifle. As a result of these events, Auman was convicted of first-degree murder (among other charges) in July 1998 and sentenced to life in prison.

Auman's conviction attracted controversy in part because she had been arrested and detained prior to Jaehnig's fatal shooting of VanderJagt. The conviction was obtained using the felony murder rule, which holds that a person accused of a violent felony may be charged with murder if the act of committing the felony resulted in someone's death even if the accused person did not personally intend or cause the death. Lisl's case attracted attention from several celebrities and public figures, most notably by Hunter S. Thompson who co-authored a Vanity Fair article that attracted significant public interest in the case.

On March 28, 2005, the Colorado Supreme Court reversed Auman's initial conviction for second degree burglary, finding that the jurors in the initial case had been given improper instructions. This also caused the reversal of Auman's conviction for murder. In 2006 Auman pleaded guilty to burglary and accessory to first-degree murder, avoiding a re-trial and resulting in a 20-year sentence of community corrections.

== Background ==
Lisl Auman was born in 1976 to Colleen and Don Auman in Colorado. Her parents divorced in 1987; her mother remarried to Rob Auerbach and Lisl alternately lived with Don and with Collen and Rob. She was named after the character "Liesl" from The Sound of Music.

After dropping out of junior college, Auman lived with a group of friends in Englewood while working various jobs. During the summer of 1997 she took a reforestation job in the mountains outside of Denver, moving to a small boarding house in Buffalo Creek. She soon entered into a relationship with Shawn Cheever, a logger working in the area who lived in the same boarding house. Their relationship deteriorated as Auman learned of Cheever's involvement in petty crime and felt he was not reciprocating her interest.

Auman subsequently moved back to her father's house in Denver, leaving her possessions behind in her and Cheever's apartments in Buffalo Creek. In November 1997, Auman met with a friend, Deme Soriano, and her boyfriend, Dion Gerze. After hearing Auman describe her predicament, Gerze offered to assist her in retrieving her possessions with the assistance of two of his friends, Matthaeus Jaehnig and Steven Duprey. In her later trial, the characterization of this meeting would differ between the prosecution and defense. Prosecutors would allege that Auman proposed – or, at minimum, agreed with – plans to burglarize Cheever, noting that Auman had voiced a desire to "retaliate" against him and, when asked about Cheever's possessions, responded that he owned two large speakers. However, Auman, Soriano, and Gerze would all deny discussing any plans to take any items other than those owned by Auman in sworn statements to the court.

== Events leading to VanderJagt's murder ==
On November 12, 1997, the group of Auman, Duprey, Gerze, Jaehnig, and Soriano left Denver in two cars bound for Buffalo Creek. The group arrived at the Buffalo Creek lodge around 1:45 PM. Auman and Soriano retrieved items from Auman's former room, while Gerze and Duprey forcibly entered Cheever's room, cutting a padlock to enter the room. Cheever was not present, and the group took items belonging to Auman in addition to items belonging to Cheever. Auman would later admit to entering Cheever's room, but not to personally taking any items not belonging to her. Unknown to the group, other residents of the lodge noticed them loading their cars with the items they had taken and notified Denver police around 2:30 PM, providing them with Jaehnig's license plate number. The group then set out to return to Denver, with Auman the passenger in Jaehnig's Pontiac Trans Am and Duprey, Gerze, and Soriano driving in Soriano's car.

Around 2:34 PM, a Denver police deputy spotted Jaehnig's Trans Am near Conifer and gave chase. The chase continued into Denver around 3:02 PM; soon after entering Denver, Jaehnig, driving recklessly and at high rates of speed, evaded the officers and the chase was temporarily abandoned. However, around 3:08 PM, a deputy spotted Jaehnig's car on East Hampden Avenue and gave pursuit. At this point, Jaehnig retrieved a Chinese SKS assault rifle, asked Auman to steer the car, and proceeded to fire three shots at the pursuing deputy. Auman controlled the steering wheel of the car for several seconds while Jaehnig was firing his weapon. The deputy slowed down in response and lost sight of the car. While regaining control of the car, Jaehnig struck another car, briefly coming to a stop. Auman recalled opening the passenger door of the car at this time and considered escaping; however, she reported Jaehnig demanded she stay in the car and she complied.

Around 3:10 PM, officers again sighted Jaehnig's Trans Am in the parking lot of Soriano's condominium in the Monaco Place complex. On their arrival they found Jaehnig and Auman standing in an alcove close to the officers. The officers approached and demanded the two surrender. Auman stepped out of the alcove and officers forced her to the ground, handcuffing her before placing her in a police car. Jaehnig disappeared, and officers began searching the complex for him. Around 3:23 PM, officer Bruce VanderJagt discovered that Jaehnig was hiding in a dead end stairwell near the alcove. When VanderJagt peered into the stairwell, Jaehnig opened fire on him, striking him 10 times in the head and torso, fatally wounding him. Jaehnig then entered into a gun battle with the remaining officers. After exhausting his own ammunition, Jaehnig retrieved VanderJagt's pistol and killed himself by firing a bullet into his head.

== Prosecution ==
While in police custody, Auman agreed to participate in two videotaped interviews on November 12, waiving her right to an attorney. During both interviews, Auman was evasive, misidentifying the color of Jaehnig's car as green (the car was red) and inaccurately identifying her companions. Auman would later admit to providing false statements, stating that she was unaware Jaehnig had been killed and she feared retaliation from him. During the interviews, Auman acknowledged that she had steered Jaehnig's car while he shot at police. She also denied ever intending to burglarize Cheever, although she did admit that, when asked by her companions about Cheever's possessions the previous night, she had mentioned two large speakers he owned.

Two days later, the officers involved in Auman's arrest would provide additional statements that differed from their initial reports. Officers Jason Brake and Marc Bennett had initially reported that Auman had immediately stepped out of the alcove she was found in with her hands raised. In their second statement, the officers instead stated Auman leaned down to the right "as if to drop something" before raising her hands, which the officers interpreted as her possibly dropping or transferring Jaehnig's gun. In a later interview, Auman denied this occurred and stated she never held Jaehnig's weapon.

Auman's trial began on July 8, 1998. The district attorney had previously offered a plea deal in which Auman would have pleaded guilty to assaulting a police officer when she steered Jaehnig's car while he fired at pursuing officers. In exchange, Auman would have received a 30 year prison sentence. Auman declined the deal. Auman and her family were unable to afford private legal representation (citing quotes for retainer fees at around $100,000, equivalent to $197,530 in 2025), so Auman was represented by the Colorado State Public Defender's office. The prosecution was led by Colorado Deputy District Attorney Tim Twining.

Auman's charges included first degree murder, first degree burglary, first degree assault, and menacing. Twining's legal strategy centered around the felony murder rule, a law stating that a defendant accused of certain "predicate" felonies may also be charged with murder if the act of committing the felony resulted in someone's death, even if the accused person did not personally intend or cause the death. In Colorado, burglary is one of these predicate felonies; therefore, Auman's charge for second-degree burglary also allowed her to be charged with murder, even though she had already been detained at the time Jaehnig fatally shot VanderJagt.

Auman's trial lasted 10 days. After several hours of deliberation, the jury found Auman guilty of first-degree murder, second-degree burglary, menacing, and conspiracy to commit first-degree burglary. She was subsequently sentenced to life in prison without parole. Auman was ultimately placed in the Women's Correctional Facility in Cañon City, Colorado.

Auman's companions at the Buffalo Creek lodge (Steven Duprey, Dion Gerze, and Deme Soriano) were separately charged only with burglary and each took a plea deal. Duprey received four years in prison. Gerze and Soriano each received two years of probation.

== Public response ==
Auman's family began attempts at public outreach following her conviction, with her stepfather creating a website (lisl.com) in order to collect information about her legal case and to attract interest. Initial coverage was primarily within Denver media, focusing on the harshness of her sentence (at the time of Auman's sentencing, life imprisonment was mandatory for felony murder) and the perceived incongruity of Auman's conviction for murder despite the uncontested fact that she was detained in police custody while a separate person committed the murder (under the felony murder rule).

In January 2001, Auman wrote a brief letter from prison to Hunter S. Thompson in which she expressed her appreciation for his novel Fear and Loathing in Las Vegas, complained that the Colorado Department of Corrections had banned his books, and briefly summarized her case. Thompson wrote back that he had heard of her situation and would consider writing about her. His subsequent publications about Auman and his personal efforts at advocacy and organization on her behalf would attract national attention towards Auman's case and the felony murder rule.

Soon after receiving Auman's letter, Thompson hosted a gathering of criminal defense lawyers visiting Aspen for a National Association of Criminal Defense Lawyers (NACDL) conference to watch the 2001 Super Bowl. During the game, Thompson discussed Auman's case, resulting in the NACDL's involvement in the case and the creation of a legal defense fund. Matt Moseley, communications director for the Colorado Senate Democratic Party, suggested that Thompson hold a public event supporting Auman. On May 14, 2001, Thompson did so, holding a rally at the Colorado State Capital with speakers including musician Warren Zevon, Pitkin County Sheriff Bob Braudis, past president of the NACDL Gerry Goldstein, and Moseley. The rally was timed to coincide with the filing of an appeal on Auman's behalf by Colorado public defender Kathleen Lord and an amicus brief filing by the NACDL.

== Appeals and re-sentencing ==
Colorado public defender Kathleen Lord appealed Auman's conviction in May 2001. Lord's arguments included that Auman was no longer "in immediate flight" once she had been detained by police, and that her arrest terminated her liability for murder. The Colorado Court of Appeals disagreed in September 2002, affirming Auman's initial convictions.

Lord next appealed to the Colorado Supreme Court. In their response in March 2005, the Supreme Court maintained that Auman's liability for murder did not terminate upon her arrest. However, they agreed with Lord's argument that the instructions given to the jury regarding her burglary charge were faulty, as they did not specify that Auman must have acted "knowingly" in taking Cheever's property when she entered his room. As Auman had stated she did not intend to steal Cheever's property and that she did not personally take any of his items, the Court felt the jury could have been misled by their improper instructions. The Court therefore reversed both Auman's burglary and murder convictions, as her conviction for murder was predicated on her burglary conviction, calling for a new trial.

In July 2005, Auman accepted a plea deal in which she pleaded guilty to burglary and accessory to first-degree murder, avoiding a re-trial. Auman was re-sentenced to 20 years of community corrections, and discharged from prison into a halfway house in October 2005. She was released from her halfway house in April 2006 under the restrictions that she remain in the Denver area and submit to close supervision for another eight years.

== See also ==
- Felony murder rule
- Felony murder and the death penalty in the United States
- Murder in Colorado law
- Hey Rube (book)
- Hunter S. Thompson
