= Murder in California law =

The law on the crime of murder in the U.S. state of California is defined by sections 187 through 191 of the California Penal Code.

The United States Centers for Disease Control and Prevention reported that in the year 2020, the state had a murder rate near the median for the entire country.

== Definition ==
The Code defines murder as "the unlawful killing of a human being, or a fetus, with malice aforethought", with the exception of abortions consented to by the mother of the fetus, where an abortion is necessary to preserve the mother's life, or when the abortion complied with the Therapeutic Abortion Act. While malice may be expressed in the form of a 'deliberate intention to take away the life of a fellow creature', it may be implied when there is no 'considerable provocation' for the killing, or when the circumstances around the killing 'show an abandoned and malignant heart'.

In California, the common law "year and a day" rule has been changed to a "three years and a day" rule. If a death occurs more than three years and one day after the act alleged to have caused it (and the act was committed on or after 1 January 1997), there is "a rebuttable presumption that the killing was not criminal", but the prosecution may seek to overcome this presumption. However, if the murder is committed by somebody who is serving a term of life imprisonment and is sentenced to state prison the year and a day rule applies instead.

== Degrees ==
There are multiple degrees of murder in California.

Second-degree murder

Second-degree murder is any murder that does not constitute first-degree murder.

First-degree murder

Murder may be charged as first-degree murder if committed under the following circumstances:

- Armor-piercing ammunition
- Poison
- Lying in wait
- Torture
- Involving a destructive device
- Any other kind of willful, deliberate, and premeditated killing
- Perpetration of, or attempt to perpetrate arson, rape, carjacking, robbery, burglary, mayhem, kidnapping, train wrecking, or any act punishable under Section 206, 286, 287, 288, or 289, or former Section 288a
- Drive-by shooting, where the intent is to kill a person

Capital murder

Also known as first degree murder with special circumstances, capital murder is distinguishable from first-degree murder in that the death penalty may be imposed upon conviction. (If the defendant was under 18, the only penalties are life without parole or 25 years to life. Youth offender parole laws require a parole hearing after 25 years regardless of sentence imposed however.) The circumstances which allow for the death penalty to be imposed for murder are contained in

- for financial gain (1)
- the defendant had previously been convicted of first or second degree murder (2)
- multiple murders (3)
- committed using explosives (4); (6)
- to avoid arrest or aiding in escaping custody (5)
- the victim was an on-duty peace officer; federal law enforcement officer or agent; or firefighter (7); (8); (9)
- the victim was a witness to a crime and the murder was committed to prevent them from testifying (10)
- the victim was a prosecutor or assistant prosecutor; judge or former judge; elected or appointed official; juror; and the murder was in retaliation for the victim's official duties (11); (12); (13); (20)
- the murder was "especially heinous, atrocious, or cruel, manifesting exceptional depravity" (14)
- the murderer lay in wait for the victim (15)
- the victim was intentionally killed because of their race, religion, nationality, or sexual orientation. (a hate crime) (16)
- the murder was committed during the committing of a robbery; kidnapping; rape; sodomy; performance of a lewd or lascivious act upon the person of a child under the age of 14 years; oral copulation; burglary; arson; train wrecking; mayhem; rape by instrument; carjacking; torture; poisoning (17),
- the murder was intentional and involved the infliction of torture (18)
- poisoning (19)
- the murder was committed by discharging a firearm from a motor vehicle (21)
- the defendant is an active member of a criminal street gang and was to further the activities of the gang (22)

In addition, aiding, abetting, counseling, commanding, inducing, soliciting, requesting, or assisting in the commission of a crime enumerated in subdivision (17), with reckless indifference to human life and as a major participant, is murder even if even if the defendant is not the actual killer.

Although technically not charged under section 187, the following crimes involving the death of a person may also lead to a death sentence.

- train wrecking which leads to a person's death
- fatal assault by a person under a life sentence, subject to the year and a day rule.

== Penalties ==
If a person is convicted of capital murder in California, that person may face a sentence of life in prison without the possibility of parole, or the death penalty.

A person convicted of first-degree murder will face a sentence of 25 years-to-life in prison, and thus must serve at least 25 years before being eligible for parole. If the murder was committed because of the victim's race, religion, or gender, the convicted will be sentenced to life in prison without the possibility of parole.

A person convicted of second-degree murder in California will face a sentence of 15 years-to-life in prison, and thus must serve at least 15 years in prison before being eligible for parole.

Punishments are increased if the murder victim was a peace officer, or was killed during a drive-by shooting.

If a gun was used during the murder, the punishment will include an additional 10, 20, or 25 years to life prison sentence. Those convicted will also receive a strike on their criminal record, and fines of up to $10,000. They will also have to pay restitution to victims, and will no longer be allowed to own a gun.

The United States Centers for Disease Control and Prevention reported that in the year 2020, the state had a murder rate near the median for the entire country.

A summary of the penalties for California's homicide offenses is listed below.

Offense	Mandatory sentencing
Misdemeanor vehicular manslaughter	Up to 1 year in jail
Involuntary manslaughter	2, 3, or 4 years (a strike under California Three Strikes Law if a firearm was used)
Felony vehicular manslaughter	2 to 10 years in prison
Voluntary manslaughter	3, 6, or 11 years in prison
Second-degree murder	Life-without-parole for 15 years (either 15 years to life or life without parole if the defendant served a prior murder conviction under Penal Code 190.05)
First-degree murder	Life-without-parole for 25 years
First-degree murder with special circumstances	Death (de jure) or life imprisonment without the possibility of parole

== Bail ==
Under the California Uniform Bail Schedule, the standard bail for murder is $750,000. The standard bail for first-degree murder with special circumstances (that is, circumstances under which the district attorney is seeking the death penalty) is "NO BAIL".

== See also ==
- Felony murder rule (California)
