= Cleophus Cooksey Jr. =

American serial killer (born 1982)

- Born: Cleophus Emmanuel Cooksey Jr. March 25, 1982 (age 44); Tucson, Arizona, U.S.
- Convictions: Armed robbery (4 counts); Manslaughter; First degree murder (8 counts); Kidnapping (2 counts); Attempted sexual assault
- Penalty: Death

Details
- Victims: 8–9+
- State: Arizona
- Date apprehended: 2001 (first arrest); December 2017 (second arrest)

Cleophus Emmanuel Cooksey Jr. (born March 25, 1982) is an American convicted spree killer and serial rapist who was found guilty in 2025 of killing eight people during a three-week killing spree in the Phoenix metropolitan area in late 2017. Cooksey was sentenced to death for six of those murders. He was also convicted of related crimes including kidnapping, armed robbery, and attempted sexual assault.

== Early life and prior convictions ==
Cooksey is a grandson of Tucson civil rights leader Roy L. Cooksey.

Cooksey was convicted of manslaughter and armed robbery in 2001. He was one of four men who attempted to rob a topless bar. Although the manager fatally shot one of Cooksey's accomplices and the shooting was deemed self-defense, under Arizona's felony murder law, Cooksey was held culpable because the death occurred during the commission of a crime. Under an agreement, he pleaded guilty to manslaughter.

== 2017 murders and arrest ==
Cooksey was linked to nine murders and other crimes committed in Phoenix and surrounding areas during a 21-day span between November and December 2017. All nine victims were shot.

On December 17, 2017, police responded to shots fired at the apartment where Cooksey's mother, Rene Cooksey, and stepfather, Edward Nunn, lived. They were found both dead at the scene, and Cooksey was arrested nearby. Investigators reportedly found evidence and personal items belonging to other victims at the apartment.

Ballistics evidence, DNA testing, stolen jewelry, and a stolen mobile phone belonging to one of the victims linked Cooksey to the other seven murders. Phoenix authorities say there is a "distinct possibility" of more victims. Investigations into unsolved murders are ongoing.

== Trial ==
Cooksey was represented by public defender Robert Reinhardt and Adrian Little. MCAO Deputy County Attorneys Josh Maxwell, Chris Sammons, and James Baumann, represented the State of Arizona. His trial began on May 5, 2025.

On September 25, Cooksey was convicted on eight murder charges.

On December 18, Cooksey was sentenced to death for six of the murders; jurors deadlocked on their sentencing recommendation for the remaining two murder counts.

== Victims ==
#	Name	Age	Date of death	Notes
1	Andrew Remillard	27	November 27, 2017	Fatally shot in a car with Parker Smith; motive unknown – left behind a child and wife
2	Parker Smith	21	November 27, 2017	Fatally shot in a car with Andrew Remillard – motive unknown
3	Salim Richards	35	December 2, 2017	Cooksey stole a Glock 9mm handgun
4	Jesus Real	25	December 11, 2017	Brother of Cooksey's ex-girlfriend – left behind children – murder occurred in Avondale
5	LaTorrie Beckford	29	December 13, 2017	Motive unknown
6	Kristopher Cameron	21	December 16, 2017	Murder occurred in Glendale – left behind an 11-month-old son and a second child on the way
7	Maria Villanueva	43	December 16, 2017	Allegedly raped by Cooksey – left behind two daughters
8	Rene Cooksey	56	December 17, 2017	Cooksey's mother
9	Edward Nunn	54	December 17, 2017	Cooksey's stepfather

Prosecutors did not charge Cooksey for the murder of Jesus Real.

== Related arrests ==
Phoenix police arrested three women: Desaree Coronado (aged 23) and sisters Griselda and Liliana Vasquez (ages 24 and 26, respectively), on one count each of hindering prosecution and tampering with physical evidence. Both are felonies. Coronado was the mother of Jesus Real's child. She was also charged with one misdemeanor count of false reporting to law enforcement. Liliana Vasquez is Cleophus Cooksey Jr.'s ex-girlfriend. Griselda Vasquez ultimately admitted to taking a mobile phone off Real's body. Police say they have evidence that Liliana's car was in the area of two of the murders.

== See also ==
- Capital punishment in Arizona
- List of death row inmates in the United States § Arizona
- List of serial killers in the United States
