= Felony murder rule =

Legal doctrine in some common-law jurisdictions

The rule of felony murder is a legal doctrine in some common law jurisdictions that broadens the crime of murder: when someone is killed (regardless of intent to kill) in the commission of a dangerous or enumerated crime (called a felony in some jurisdictions), the offender, and also the offender's accomplices or co-conspirators, may be found guilty of murder.

The concept of felony murder originates in the rule of transferred intent. In its original form, the malicious intent inherent in the commission of any crime, however trivial, was considered to apply to any consequences of that crime regardless of intent.

== History ==
While there is debate about the original scope of the rule, modern interpretations typically require that the offence be an inherently dangerous one, or one committed in an obviously dangerous manner. For this reason, the felony murder rule is often justified by its supporters as a means of deterring dangerous felonies.

According to some commentators, the common law rule dates to the twelfth century and took its modern form in the eighteenth century. The modern conception of the felony murder rule arose in 1716, with William Hawkins' Treatise of Pleas of the Crown, during his work on English criminal law. Hawkins reasoned that malice was implicit in a crime that "necessarily tends to raise Tumults and Quarrels, and consequently cannot but be attended with the danger of personal hurt." Thus, "this rule should extend to killings in the course of felonies à fortiori."

== Elements ==
In most jurisdictions, to qualify as an underlying offense for a felony murder charge, the underlying offense must present a foreseeable danger to life, and the link between the offense and the death must not be too remote. For example, if the recipient of a forged check has a fatal allergic reaction to the ink, most courts will not hold the forger guilty of murder, as the cause of death is too remote from the criminal act.

There are two schools of thought concerning whose actions can cause the defendant to be guilty of felony murder. Jurisdictions that hold to the "agency theory" admit only deaths caused by the agents of the crime. Jurisdictions that use the "proximate cause theory" include any death, even if caused by a bystander or the police, provided that it meets one of several proximate cause tests to determine if the chain of events between the offence and the death was short enough to have legally caused the death.

The merger doctrine excludes from the offenses that qualify as underlying offenses any felony that is presupposed by a murder charge. For example, nearly all murders involve some type of assault, but so do many cases of manslaughter. To count any death that occurred during the course of an assault as felony murder would obliterate a distinction that is carefully set by the legislature. However, merger may not apply when an assault against one person results in the death of a different person.

Felony murder is typically the same grade of murder as premeditated murder and carries the same sentence as is used for premeditated murder in the jurisdiction in question.

== By country ==
The felony murder rule has been abolished in England and Wales and in Northern Ireland. In Canada, it has been held to be unconstitutional, as breaching the principles of fundamental justice. In some jurisdictions, the common law felony murder (called constructive murder) rule has been abolished, but has been replaced by a similar statutory provision (such as in Victoria, Australia with the Crimes Act 1958). Similarly, in New South Wales, common law has been overridden and the question needs only be dealt with through statutory construction and application.

=== Australia ===
In New South Wales, § 18(1)(a) of the Crimes Act 1900 provides the statutory definition of 'constructive murder'. The act or omission causing death must be "done in an attempt to commit or during or immediately after the commission, by the accused, or some accomplice with him or her, of a crime punishable by imprisonment for life or for 25 years". The rationale is to discourage acts of felony which are dangerous to human life.

Ryan v R clarifies the elements of constructive murder. The prosecution must prove beyond reasonable doubt: (1) a base offence with 25 years' imprisonment or more; and that (2) the act causing death occurred in attempt, during, or immediately after this base offence. This means that the prosecution must prove both the actus reus and mens rea of this base offence. R v Munro confirmed that the mens rea of the act causing death is not required to prove constructive murder. For example, the accused may commit an act causing death in the course of robbery or armed robbery without any intention to kill, to inflict grievous bodily harm, or with reckless indifference to human life.

=== Canada ===
As Canadian criminal law aims to maintain proportionality between the stigma and punishment attached to a conviction and the moral blameworthiness of an offender, in R v Martineau the Supreme Court of Canada held that it is a principle of fundamental justice under sections 7 and 11(d) of the Canadian Charter of Rights and Freedoms that a conviction for murder requires proof beyond a reasonable doubt of a subjective foresight of death. In so doing, the court declared sections 230 and 229(c) of the Criminal Code to be unconstitutional.

S. 230 provided that a conviction for murder would lie for any killing that was "objectively foreseeable as a result of the abominable nature of the predicate crimes ... inter alia ... coupled with intentional infliction of bodily harm". This largely equated with a Canadian form of felony murder, though it is technically closer to constructive murder in other jurisdictions. Similarly, according to s. 229(c) it was sufficient for a person to do anything that he "ought to know is likely to cause death".

Nevertheless, s. 229(c), as far as it provides for a form of constructive murder in situations where "an accused for an unlawful object did anything knowing that it was likely [on an objective standard] to cause someone's death" is still operative, as confirmed in a 1999 appellate court decision.

Bill C-39 was introduced in 2017 in order to repeal s. 230 and modify s. 229(c).

Like other common law jurisdictions, Canada's Criminal Code specifically enumerates offences to account for instances where (a) person(s) is/are unintentionally killed during the commission of a crime (for example, criminal negligence causing death and impaired driving causing death). In cases where multiple deaths are caused by the same criminal act, the accused will face a separate charge for each death caused. While such charges are not considered to be murder under Canadian law, the maximum penalty for such offences is still life imprisonment – although unlike murder this is not a mandatory sentence and is only very rarely imposed. The main difference between a sentence of life imprisonment for murder and a sentence of life imprisonment for an offence such as criminal negligence causing death is that in the latter case, the offender is eligible for parole after serving seven years.

=== Ireland ===
The rule was abolished in the Republic of Ireland by section 4 of the Criminal Justice Act 1964 which codified the mens rea for murder as intention to kill or seriously injure another person.

=== United Kingdom ===
The felony murder rule was abolished in the United Kingdom in 1957.

==== England and Wales, Northern Ireland ====
The rule was abolished in England and Wales by section 1 of the Homicide Act 1957, and in Northern Ireland by section 8 of the Criminal Justice Act (Northern Ireland) 1966; but its effect is preserved by the application of the common law principle of joint enterprise. In England and Wales, the definition of murder requires only an intent to cause grievous bodily harm to the victim, rather than specific intent to kill; the effect is the same as that of the felony murder rule applied to crimes of personal violence, though not to all felonies.

In 2006, as part of a broad review of the law on murder, the Law Commission considered and rejected the suggestion of reinstating the felony murder rule in English law.

==== Scotland ====
There is no equivalent to the felony murder rule in Scots law, which has also never had a specific concept of felonies in the previous style of English law. However, the Scots equivalent of joint enterprise, known as "art and part", also has a similar effect.

=== United States ===
As of August 2008, 46 states in the United States had a felony murder rule, under which felony murder is generally first-degree murder. In 24 of those states, it is a capital offense. When the government seeks to impose the death penalty on someone convicted of felony murder, the Eighth Amendment has been interpreted so as to impose additional limitations on the state power. The death penalty may not be imposed if the defendant is merely a minor participant and did not actually kill or intend to kill. However, the death penalty may be imposed if the defendant is a major participant in the underlying felony and exhibits extreme indifference to human life.

Most states recognize the merger doctrine, which holds that a criminal assault cannot serve as the predicate felony for the felony murder rule.

To avoid the need for reliance upon common law interpretations of what felony conduct merges with murder, and what offenses do and do not qualify for felony murder, many U.S. jurisdictions explicitly list what offenses qualify in a felony murder statute. Federal law specifies additional crimes, including terrorism, kidnapping, and carjacking.

The American Law Institute's Model Penal Code does not include the felony murder rule, but allows the commission of a felony to raise a presumption of extreme indifference to the value of human life. The felony murder rule is effectively used as a rule of evidence. The Model Penal Code lists robbery, rape or forcible deviant sexual intercourse, arson, burglary, and felonious escape as predicate felonies upon which a charge of felony murder can be maintained.

==== State law ====
- Alabama
- Alaska
- American Samoa
- Arizona
- Arkansas
- California
- Colorado
- Connecticut
- Delaware
- Florida
- Georgia
- Guam
- Hawaii (abolished)
- Idaho
- Illinois
- Indiana
- Iowa
- Kansas
- Kentucky (abolished)
- Louisiana
- Maine
- Maryland
- Massachusetts
- Michigan (abolished)
- Minnesota
- Mississippi
- Missouri
- Montana
- Nebraska
- Nevada
- New Hampshire
- New Jersey (follows Model Penal Code)
- New Mexico
- New York
- North Carolina
- North Dakota
- Northern Mariana Islands
- Ohio
- Oklahoma
- Oregon
- Pennsylvania
- Puerto Rico
- Rhode Island
- South Carolina
- South Dakota
- Tennessee
- Texas
- Utah
- Vermont
- Virgin Islands, US
- Virginia
- Washington
- West Virginia
- Wisconsin
- Wyoming
- District of Columbia
- Federal

===== Colorado =====
Lisl Auman was convicted under the felony murder rule in connection with a felony burglary conviction in 1998 and initially received a life sentence. Her conviction was later reversed, and she pleaded guilty to lesser charges in 2016.

===== Kentucky =====
In the state of Kentucky, the common law felony murder rule has been completely abolished. The Kentucky Legislature abolished the felony murder rule with the enactment of Kentucky Revised Statutes § 507.020. Recognizing that an automatic application of the rule could result in conviction of murder without a culpable mindset, the Kentucky Legislature instead allowed the circumstances of a case, like the commission of a felony, to be considered separately. The facts each case would be used to show the mental state of the defendant instead of using an automatic rule.

===== Minnesota v. Derek Michael Chauvin =====
The police officer who murdered George Floyd was tried and convicted under the felony murder rule.

== Criticism ==
Some commentators regard the rule of transferred intent as a legal fiction whereby the law pretends that the person who intended one wrongful act also intends all the consequences of that act, however unforeseen. Others regard it as an example of strict liability, whereby a person who chooses to commit a crime is considered absolutely responsible for all possible consequences of that action. Lord Mustill regarded the historical rule as a convergence of those views.

Some critics of the felony murder rule argue that the rule is unjust because it does not require intent to kill. For example, in 2003, twenty-year-old Florida resident Ryan Holle was convicted of first-degree murder after lending his car to a friend who used it in a robbery during which another participant killed an 18-year-old woman, although Holle remained at home. Similarly, Doug Gilding was sentenced to life without parole under Florida's felony murder rule for a 1997 robbery and killing that occurred while he was at home asleep, after having been present when the robbery was discussed the previous day.

Felony murder rules give prosecutors more leverage when a plea bargain is being negotiated, because prosecutors may offer the dropping of such a charge as a bargaining chip which they otherwise would not have. A 2022 review of criminal convictions in Minnesota found that most white defendants convicted of felony murder were originally charged with more serious offenses, while felony murder was the most serious offence initially charged against Black defendants. Almost half of defendants charged with felony murder in Minnesota were under the age of 25, and the average sentence was 24 years.

Felony murder is also criticised as unfair in situations involving excessive force or careless use of extreme force by law enforcement, particularly in police shootings. Deaths caused by police action can then be attributed to defendants instead of a law enforcement officer, even if the victim was unarmed, the officer(s) involved had histor(ies) of excessive force, etc. In such circumstances, there may be no incentive for a police officer or a police department to alter their standard procedures.

Scholars have also identified substantial racial disparities in the application of the felony murder rule. Alexandra Harrington, a legal scholar at University at Buffalo, has stated that "[b]lack people were 34 times as likely as white people to be convicted of felony murder as participants that didn't do the actual killing."

In favor of the rule, it can be argued that the rule affirms the principle of the sanctity of human life by imposing harsher penalties for crimes that destroy human life.

== See also ==
- Common purpose
- Law of parties
