= Preston Lord homicide case =

2023 murder in Queen Creek, Arizona

- Location: Queen Creek, Arizona, United States
- Date: October 28, 2023
- Deaths: 1
- Victim: Preston Lord (aged 16)
- Accused: 7

The Preston Lord homicide case refers to the murder of 16-year-old Preston Lord in Queen Creek, Arizona, in October 2023. Seven individuals between the ages of 15 and 18 were arrested and charged with first-degree murder in connection with the case. According to the medical examiners report, 16-year-old Preston Lord died of multiple blunt force injuries after being attacked in October 2023 and that no drugs or alcohol were found in his system.

== Background ==
Preston Lord was a 16-year-old high school student in Queen Creek, Arizona. On October 30, 2023, Lord was pronounced dead after having been attacked in a remote area of Queen Creek on October 28, 2023. The medical examiner ruled his death a homicide.

== Investigation and arrests ==
The Queen Creek Police Department launched an investigation into Lord's murder. Over the course of several weeks, seven suspects between the ages of 15 and 18 were arrested and charged with first-degree murder.

The investigation revealed that the suspects allegedly planned to rob Lord and that the murder was premeditated.

One of the suspects, a 17-year-old, was initially named as a person of interest but then participated in a high school football game after being named as a suspect. This led to accusations of a potential cover-up by the teenager's family.

In March 2024, a grand jury indicted the seven suspects on charges of first-degree murder. Seven individuals were indicted: Talan Renner, Talyn Vigil, Treston Billey, Dominic Turner, Taylor Sherman, Jacob Meisner, and William Hines.

== Court proceedings ==
In May 2024, the seven suspects appeared in court for a target trial date. The suspects were indicted on charges of first-degree murder.

The case has drawn significant media attention, and prosecutors have indicated they will seek the harshest possible punishments for the suspects.

William Owen Hines was sentenced to 12 years in the death of Preston Lord. He was also sentenced to an additional five years (with credit for 456 days already served) after pleading guilty to vehicular aggravated assault in a separate case. The two sentences will be served consecutively.

== See also ==
- Murder in Arizona
