= Murder in Michigan law =

Murder in Michigan law constitutes the intentional killing, under circumstances defined by law, of people within or under the jurisdiction of the U.S. state of Michigan.

The United States Centers for Disease Control and Prevention reported that in the year 2020, the state had a murder rate well above the median for the entire country.

== Definitions ==
=== First-degree murder ===
Michigan specifies a variety of homicide offenses, with first-degree murder being the most severe. In Michigan, a person is found guilty of first-degree murder when murder is perpetrated by means of poison, lying in wait, or any other willful, deliberate, and premeditated killing. The only sentence for adult offenders is life in prison without the possibility of parole. For juvenile offenders, they can be sentenced to either life-without-parole, or any number of years at a minimum of 60 years, with the possibility of parole after 25 to 40 years.

=== Second-degree murder ===
Second-degree murder in Michigan is defined as an intentional killing without premeditation, a killing caused by the perpetrator's reckless indifference to human life, or an assault causing death without intention to kill. It's punishable by life without the possibility of parole or any number of years in prison.

== Felony murder rule ==
The felony murder rule was abolished in the state of Michigan by the 1980 decision People v. Aaron. The court reasoned that the commission of a felony should only be used as a grading factor between first and second degree murder, and not something that could independently make an offense punishable as murder.

== Penalties ==
Offense	Mandatory sentencing
Aiding suicide	Up to 5 years in prison
Involuntary manslaughter	Up to 15 years in prison
Voluntary manslaughter	Up to 15 years in prison
Death due to explosives	For defendants 21 and older: Maximum of life-without parole For defendants under 21: Maximum of life-without parole
Sale of a controlled substance resulting in death	For defendants 21 and older: Maximum of life-without parole For defendants under 21: Maximum of life-without parole
Second-degree murder	For defendants 21 and older: Maximum of life-without parole For defendants under 21: Maximum of life-without parole
Terrorism resulting in death	For defendants 21 and older: Life imprisonment without the possibility of parole For defendants under 21: 25 years to life in prison without the possibility of parole
First-degree murder	For defendants 21 and older: Life imprisonment without the possibility of parole For defendants under 21: 25 years to life in prison without the possibility of parole

== See also ==
- Law of Michigan
- Law of the United States
