= 1998 Westside Middle School shooting =

1998 mass shooting in Jonesboro, Arkansas, US

- Location: 35.8569°N 90.8058°W; Craighead County (Jonesboro street address), Arkansas, U.S.
- Date: March 24, 1998; 28 years ago c. 12:40 p.m. (CST; UTC–6)
- Target: Students and staff at Westside Middle School
- Attack type: School shooting; mass shooting; mass murder; crime of passion
- Weapons: Remington 742 .30-06 semi-automatic rifle (fitted with a telescopic sight); Ruger .44 Magnum rifle; Universal .30 M1 carbine replica; Smith & Wesson .38 Special revolver; Double Deuce Buddie .22 caliber two-shot derringer; FIE .380 semi-automatic pistol; Star .380 semi-automatic pistol; Ruger Security Six .357 revolver; Davis Industries .38 caliber two-shot derringer; Charter Arms .38 Special revolver
- Deaths: 5
- Injuries: 10
- Perpetrators: Mitchell Scott Johnson; Andrew Douglas Golden (later Drew Douglas Grant)
- Defender: Shannon Dawn Wright
- Motive: Revenge; Anger
- Verdict: Guilty on all counts
- Convictions: Capital murder (5 counts); Attempted murder (10 counts); Illegal firearm possession (7 counts)
- Sentence: Imprisonment until the age of 21: Johnson released after 7 years and 4 months in prison; Golden released after 9 years and 2 months in prison

The 1998 Westside Middle School shooting was a mass shooting that occurred on March 24, 1998, at Westside Middle School in unincorporated Craighead County, Arkansas, near the city of Jonesboro. Thirteen-year-old Mitchell Johnson and eleven-year-old Andrew Golden opened fire on the school, shooting and killing five people (Note: Four students and a teacher.) and wounding ten others. Both were arrested when they attempted to flee the scene. On August 11, 1998, Golden and Johnson were convicted of five murders and ten assaults, and were imprisoned until each turned twenty-one years of age. After the 1992 Lindhurst High School shooting that killed four people in Olivehurst, California, the massacre was the deadliest non-college school shooting in contemporary U.S. history until the April 1999 Columbine High School massacre. As of 2026, the incident is the deadliest mass shooting at a middle school in U.S. history.

== Shooting ==
On the night before the shooting, Golden assisted Johnson in loading his mother's Dodge Caravan with camping supplies, snack foods, a number of weapons (a Remington 742 .30-06 rifle, Universal .30 M1 carbine replica, Smith & Wesson .38 Special revolver, Double Deuce Buddie .22 caliber two-shot derringer, FIE .380 pistol, Star .380 pistol, Ruger Security Six .357 revolver, Davis Industries .38 two-shot derringer, and Charter Arms .38 Special revolver), seven of which had been stolen from Golden's grandfather's house and three from Golden's father's house, as well as 2,000 rounds of ammunition.

The following morning, the perpetrators rode in the van to Westside Middle School, arriving late after deliberately missing their bus. Golden then pulled the fire alarm just after 12:30 p.m., during the beginning of fifth period, while Johnson took the weapons to the woods outside of the school. Golden then ran back to the woods where Johnson had taken the weapons. When children and teachers fled out of the school, the two perpetrators opened fire, with officials stating that the shooting began at 12:41 pm. During the incident, many became confused initially with reports of shouting of "It's all fake", as friends of wounded students tried to evacuate their friends and teacher Shannon Wright used her body to protect a wounded student. Another teacher had been checking off students on her class list when she heard pops, "like firecrackers", and thought it was an ill-advised attempt to frighten the children, to potentially make them take the drill seriously. A student reported that the sounds were at first dismissed by some, as construction workers had been working on the new fifth-grade building nearby.

Students who had initially evacuated for the drill were brought back into the school's gymnasium, where students could hear the bullets ricocheting off the outside bricks and walls. Some victims were brought back inside by uninjured students and teachers after a teacher opened the doors from the inside, as they had automatically locked because of the fire alarm. A student who had sought shelter in the school told a teacher with them that they believed the shooter was Mitchell Johnson, as they had been told by him not to come to school that day.

The perpetrators killed four students and one teacher and wounded nine students and one teacher. The five murdered were: Shannon Wright, 32 (teacher); Stephanie Johnson, 12 (no relation to Mitchell Johnson); Natalie Brooks, 11; Paige Ann Herring, 12; and Brittheny (Note: Brittheny is the correct spelling.) Varner, 11. All ten of those injured survived their injuries; among the wounded students was Tristan McGowan, a cousin of Golden's. After firing a combined total of 22 bullets, Golden and Johnson attempted to run back to the van and escape, but they were later caught by the police. They were apprehended about 10 minutes after the shooting began, according to a lieutenant with the Jonesboro Police Department. The perpetrators evidently planned to run away, as they had food, sleeping bags and survival gear in the van.

== Aftermath ==
The incident was the third fatal mass shooting at an American school since October 1997, following the Pearl High and the Heath High School shootings. President Bill Clinton ordered Attorney General Janet Reno to organize experts on school violence to analyze the recent incidents, determine what they may have had in common, and what steps could be taken to reduce the chance of a similar incident.

=== Memorials ===
White ribbons were tied on tree trunks and other objects were left in memory of the victims. The school installed a memorial bench outside the school that is carved with the date of the massacre. A sundial memorial, installed in a park area behind the school, is engraved with the names of the victims. The park area was designed as a memorial park based around the number five to commemorate the five dead victims, with five trees, five picnic tables, and five stepping-stones, along with the sundial.

=== Trial ===
During the trial, Johnson hung his head and read a letter of apology he had written to victims' families. He said he had not been targeting anyone.

While in detention awaiting trial, Johnson wrote a letter that stated, "Hi. My name is Mitchell. My thoughts and prayers are with those people who were killed, or shot, and their families. I am really sad inside about everything. My thoughts and prayers are with those kids that I go to school with. I really want people to know the real Mitchell someday. Sincerely, Mitchell Johnson."

Due to their ages, they were tried as juveniles, and were found guilty of five counts of murder. Following their convictions, Johnson and Golden were taken by National Guard helicopter to Alexander, Arkansas, so they could be placed at the Arkansas Juvenile Assessment & Treatment Center (AJATC), the Arkansas Department of Human Services Youth Services Division's juvenile facility and the state's most secure juvenile facility.

=== Imprisonment ===
The two youths were among the youngest people ever charged with murder in the United States. The Jonesboro prosecutor later stated that, were it not for their ages, he would have sought death sentences. At the time, the minimum age for capital punishment was 16 due to Thompson v. Oklahoma. All death sentences for defendants under 18 were invalidated in 2005 by Roper v. Simmons.

In August 1998, both perpetrators were sentenced to confinement until they reached the age of 21, which was the maximum sentence available under Arkansas law for minors under the age of 14. They would have served until age 18 had federal authorities not added additional confinement for weapons charges. Judge Ralph Wilson commented that "The punishment will not fit the crime." The case led to wide public outcry for tougher sentencing laws pertaining to juvenile offenders. Johnson was released from the Federal Correctional Institution, Memphis, on his 21st birthday, August 11, 2005, having spent seven years in prison. Golden was released from the Federal Correctional Institution, Memphis, on May 25, 2007, also on his 21st birthday, after spending nine years in prison.

=== Lawsuit ===
In 2017, the victims' families were awarded $150 million after filing a lawsuit against Johnson and Golden seeking damages and to prevent the two from profiting from the shooting.

== Perpetrators ==
Johnson and Golden were both students at Westside Middle School. The pair rode the bus together, but were not close friends. Together, they were known to bully other students, and people recalled Johnson talking of wanting to belong to the Bloods and to smoke marijuana. The Texaco truck stop was a popular hang-out for youths in Jonesboro, and adolescents there remember Johnson claiming to belong to street gangs. He also spoke of "having a lot of killing to do" and his classmates also commented that he had a fascination with firearms. He had particularly threatened to kill sixth-grader Candace Porter, his former girlfriend who ended their relationship.

Golden was a sixth-grader at the school, where schoolmates said he displayed troublesome behavior. He would often engage other students in fistfights and use profane language. A classmate accused him of killing her cat with a BB gun.

Three months before the incident, a student reported to a school counselor that Golden had stated he intended to shoot some people at the school. When Golden was called to the counselor, he stated that he had a nightmare in which he followed through and then was killed, scaring him off the plan. The day before the massacre, Johnson told friends he had "a lot of killing to do" and suggested to them that they would know the next day whether they were destined to live or die.

=== Mitchell Johnson ===
Mitchell Scott Johnson was born August 11, 1984, in Rochester, Minnesota, to Gretchen and Scott Johnson. When Mitchell was seven, his parents divorced, and he and his brother moved with their mother to Jonesboro, Arkansas. His mother soon remarried to Terry Woodard, an inmate at the prison where she was employed as a Correctional Officer. Johnson had a good relationship with his stepfather and brother, and adults who remembered him described him as being quiet and respectful. He was a former member of the Central Baptist Church youth choir, later joining the youth group at the Revival Tabernacle Church, Jonesboro.

Following the shooting, Johnson's attorney claimed that he had been sexually abused when he was 6 and 7 years old by a "family member of the daycare where he was placed". One year before the shooting, Mitchell, then aged 12, was charged with molesting a 3-year-old girl while visiting southern Minnesota with his family. However, the record of the case was expunged because of Mitchell's age.

==== Johnson's later legal troubles ====
On January 1, 2007, Johnson was arrested by the ATF after a traffic stop in Fayetteville, Arkansas, on misdemeanor charges of carrying a weapon, a loaded 9 mm pistol, and possession of 21.2 g of marijuana. Though the van that Johnson was riding in was registered to him, the driver was 22-year-old Justin Trammell. Trammell and Johnson reportedly met at Alexander Youth Services Correctional Facility in Alexander, Arkansas, where Trammell was incarcerated after pleading guilty to the 1999 crossbow murder of his father, a crime committed when Trammell was 15. The pair were roommates and provided officers with the same Fayetteville address. Trammell was cited for careless driving and released. Johnson was arrested for possession of marijuana and a loaded weapon and later released on a $1,000 bond. He appeared in court on January 26, 2007, at the Washington County, Arkansas, courthouse.

Johnson was indicted by a federal grand jury on October 24, 2007, for possession of a firearm while either using or addicted to a controlled substance. The US Attorney's Office for the Western District of Arkansas reported that Johnson pleaded not guilty and was released on a $5,000 bond. Johnson's trial began on January 28, 2008. After two days of testimony from the prosecution and the defense witnesses, Johnson was found guilty on a charge of possessing a weapon while being a drug user. In February 2008, just days after his conviction, Johnson was arrested again for possession of marijuana at the convenience store at which he worked and on suspicion of using a stolen credit card.

In September 2008, US District Judge Jimm Larry Hendren sentenced Johnson to four years in prison on the weapon and drug charges. During his sentencing, the judge expressed dismay that Johnson had not taken advantage of the chance he had to reform. He told him, "No matter your sentence, you still have a life; those killed in 1998 do not." On October 7, 2008, Johnson pleaded guilty to a felony theft charge and misdemeanor possession of marijuana. Johnson admitted that he stole a debit card left by a disabled man at the Bentonville gas station where he worked and subsequently used it to purchase a meal at a local Burger King. He also admitted that at the time he was arrested, he was in possession of marijuana. On November 14, 2008, Johnson, then 24 years old, was sentenced to 12 years in prison for the theft charge and misdemeanor possession charges. Although Johnson could have faced up to 30 years, the sentence of 12 years was given because Johnson technically had no criminal record from the Jonesboro shooting.

On January 23, 2009, Johnson was sentenced to six additional years in prison for a further charge of theft by receiving and financial identity fraud for using the stolen card to purchase a meal from a local Burger King. Circuit Judge William Storey told Johnson, "You continue to run afoul of the law. I am hopeful this is the last time." That brought Johnson's combined state sentences to 18 years. In February 2010, the Arkansas Supreme Court granted Johnson leave to appeal his sentence by saying that the trial judge should not have admitted evidence of the juvenile convictions during the sentencing phase of the theft and possession trial. Johnson will have to complete his federal sentence of four years after serving his 18-year state sentence. He could have remained incarcerated into his forties but was eligible for parole from his Arkansas sentence in 2011, after which he served the four-year federal sentence. In February 2016, ABC News reported online that Johnson was released in July 2015 into the custody of the United States Probation Office for the Southern District of Texas and placed in a drug rehabilitation program.

=== Andrew Golden ===
Andrew Douglas Golden was born May 25, 1986, in Jonesboro, Arkansas, to Jacqueline and Dennis Golden; he died July 27, 2019, aged 33, near Cave City, Arkansas, after being struck in a head-on traffic accident. By all accounts, Golden came from a stable household, having a good relationship with both his parents, and he regularly visited his grandparents and great-grandmother. Both of his parents worked as postal workers, and his paternal grandfather, Douglas Golden, was a wildlife conservation officer in Jonesboro.

Golden was taught to shoot guns from a young age. His father and grandfather taught him to hunt. A video surfaced of Golden in a backyard shooting range, and he received a Christmas gift of a shotgun when he was six years old. After the shooting, pictures of a young Golden armed with firearms would be published by magazines, including on the cover of Time.

After he was released from prison on May 25, 2007, Golden's whereabouts were unknown until he applied for a concealed weapon permit in Arkansas on October 7, 2008, under the name he used until his death, Drew Douglas Grant. His application was denied by the Arkansas State Police, who noted that he had lied on the application about his previous residences and declared it was illegal for Golden to own or possess a firearm. The assumed name that Golden was using had been unknown until this point because of a gag order, but police were able to tie Andrew Golden to Grant through fingerprint records during the background check for the permit. He was living in Cape Girardeau, Missouri, at the time and attending Batesville Community College.

Golden completed his civil case deposition on May 6, 2008. As of 2017, Golden was said to be living outside of Cape Girardeau, Missouri while Johnson was said to be living in Houston, Texas. Their exact whereabouts were withheld by the government for legal reasons.

Golden died on July 27, 2019, after a 2013 Chevrolet Tahoe departed its lane, crashing head-on into Golden's 2017 Honda CRV on U.S. Route 167 in Independence County, Arkansas near Cave City, Arkansas, about 65 miles (105 km) west of Jonesboro and 100 miles (160 km) north of Little Rock. The Chevrolet driver, identified as Daniel Petty, 59, of Essex, Missouri, was also killed in the crash, according to an Arkansas State Police preliminary summary of the wreck. Three other people, including Golden's wife, another adult, and Golden's daughter, were injured and taken to hospitals in Little Rock and Batesville. At the time of his death Golden was said to be living in Jackson, Missouri.

== See also ==
- List of school shootings in the United States by death toll
- List of school shootings in the United States (before 2000)
- List of attacks related to secondary schools
- List of school massacres by death toll
