= Murder in South Carolina law =

Murder in South Carolina law constitutes the intentional killing, under circumstances defined by law, of people within or under the jurisdiction of the U.S. state of South Carolina.

The United States Centers for Disease Control and Prevention reported that in the year 2020, the state had the sixth highest murder rate in the country.

== Felony murder rule ==
In the state of South Carolina, the common law felony murder rule is treated as an automatic aggravator for underlying felonies. It is codified in SC Code § 16-3-20 but it is largely the creation of the state judiciary. There are six underlying predicate felonies, five of which are traditional predicate felonies such as kidnapping, larceny, robbery, burglary and rape, as well as one nontraditional predicate felony, drug trafficking. South Carolina is one of the few jurisdictions to require malice as an element for felony murder. The South Carolina Supreme Court recommended juries be permitted to infer the malice from some particular felonious purpose. Co-felons are held liable in South Carolina for "any homicide that is the 'probable or natural consequence of the acts which were done in pursuance of this common design.'"

== Penalties ==
Offense	Mandatory sentencing
Involuntary manslaughter	Up to 5 years in prison
Voluntary manslaughter	2 to 30 years in prison
Homicide by child abuse	20 years to life in prison
Murder	Death (aggravating circumstances) or; 30 years to life imprisonment without the possibility of parole
