= Murder in Vermont law =

Murder in Vermont law constitutes the intentional killing, under circumstances defined by law, of people within or under the jurisdiction of the U.S. state of Vermont.

The United States Centers for Disease Control and Prevention reported that in the year 2020, the state had the lowest murder rate in the country, in a near tie with New Hampshire.

== Felony murder rule ==
In the state of Vermont the common law felony murder rule is codified at 13 V.S.A. § 2301. This rule provides that anyone who kills another person while committing or attempting to commit an arson, sexual assault, aggravated sexual assault, robbery or burglary, shall be guilty of first degree murder. Every other factor not provided in this statute is murder in the second degree.

== Penalties ==
Offense	Mandatory sentencing
Manslaughter	1 to 10 years in prison
Second degree murder if mitigating factors outweigh any aggravating factors	Life (minimum of 10–20 years)
Second degree murder	Life (minimum of 20 years)
Second degree murder if aggravating factors outweigh any mitigating factors	Life without parole (juveniles cannot be sentenced to life without parole) or life (minimum of at least 20 years)
First degree murder if mitigating factors outweigh any aggravating factors	Life (minimum of 15–35 years)
First degree murder	Life (minimum of 35 years)
First degree murder if aggravating factors outweigh any mitigating factors	Life without parole (juveniles cannot be sentenced to life without parole) or life (minimum of at least 35 years)
Aggravated murder	Life without parole (juveniles cannot be sentenced to life without parole)
