= Hey Rube (book) =

Book by Hunter S. Thompson

Hey Rube: Blood Sport, the Bush Doctrine, and the Downward Spiral of Dumbness
- First edition
- Author: Hunter S. Thompson
- Genre: Non-fiction
- Publisher: Simon & Schuster
- Publication date: 2004

Hey Rube: Blood Sport, the Bush Doctrine, and the Downward Spiral of Dumbness is a book written by Hunter S. Thompson, consisting of 83 articles split into three parts. The articles were first published on ESPN.com's Page 2 under Thompson's column Hey Rube. First published in mid-2004, the book contains articles from November 20, 2000, to October 13, 2003. It is sub-titled, Modern History from the Sports Desk.

This was the final book Thompson published before his death in February 2005.

== Synopsis ==
Most of the columns were written primarily as sports commentary, but tend to branch into other subjects—commonly politics and social commentary—either due to a perceived relevance to the sports news, or as a result of Thompson's natural discursive tendencies. Some articles are focused on subjects entirely outside sports, such as "Fear and Loathing in America" and "Love Blooms in the Rockies", which deal with the 9/11 attacks and Thompson's marriage, respectively.

Thompson also chimes in on world events at the time of writing the articles. He voices his distaste for the 2000 presidential election, promotes warning as he writes through September 11, and tells of his crusade to free Lisl Auman, who had been sentenced to 20 years in prison in connection to the murder of a police officer.

Included in Hey Rube is a copy of a personal report written about Thompson during his time in the United States Air Force at Eglin Air Force Base in Florida. It requests that he be reassigned duties and advises that Thompson should not do any unauthorized writing or accept outside employment with local media. Thompson also includes a personal political statement and an “Honor Roll” which includes the names of such figures as Johnny Depp, Fidel Castro, Al Gore, and Anita Thompson.

The title is taken from the 19th century slogan "Hey, Rube!", a slang term of circus folk used to rally other carnies to their aid during a fight with a patron from the local town. Thompson elaborates in the introduction on the meaning of the term and the zeitgeist of old-fashioned circuses from the golden era that spawned the term.

== Included articles ==
Part One

- The New Dumb
- The Fix Is In
- Welcome to Generation Z
- The White House Disease
- Get Ready for Sainthood
- The Xmas Vice
- The Curse of Musburger
- Cruel Twist in the Coaching Business
- The NFL Sucks...Another League Bites the Dust...Rich Kids with Weapons
- Slow Week for Sports, in Politics
- Lynching in Denver
- Mad Cow Disease Comes to the NBA
- Death in the Afternoon
- XFL, R.I.P.
- The Most Horrible Curse in Sports
- Urgent Warning to Gamblers: Beware the Ideas of March
- I Told You It Was Wrong
- Where Were You When the Fun Stopped?
- Running Away with the Circus
- NBA and the Downward Spiral of Dumbness
- Bad Craziness at Owl Farm
- Can the Three Stooges Save the NBA?
- Kentucky Derby and Other Gambling Disasters
- Quitting the Gambling Business While I'm Ahead
- The Most Dangerous Sport of All
- Patrick Roy and Warren Zevon- Two Champions at the Top of Their Game
- Wild Days at the Sports Desk
- Eerie Lull Rattles the Sports World
- Olympic Disaster in Utah
- The Wisdom of Nashville and the Violence of Jack Nicholson- A Football Story

Part Two

- Fear and Loathing in America: The Beginning of the End
- When War Drums Roll
- Will Sports Survive Bin Laden?
- Stadium Living in the New Age
- Football in the Kingdom of Fear
- Foul Balls and Rash Predictions
- Getting Weird for Devil's Day
- The Yankees are Dead: Long Live the Yankees
- The Man Who Loved Sport Too Much
- The Shame of Indianapolis
- Failure, Football, and Violence on the Strip
- Madness in Honolulu
- Break Up the Ravens
- Pay Up or Get Whipped
- Getting Braced for the Last Football Game
- Sodomized at the Airport: Are Terrorists Seizing Control of the NFL? And Who Let It Happen?
- Slow Dance in Rap Town
- Dr. Thompson in Beirut
- Dr. Thompson Is Back from Beirut
- The NFL: We Will March on a Road of Bones

Part Three

- A Wild and Wooly Tale of Sporting Excess
- My 49er Habit
- Don't Let This Happen to You
- Grantland Rice Haunts the Honolulu Marathon
- Honolulu Marathon is Decadent and Depraved
- Public Shame and Private Victory
- Shooting the Moon with the Raiders
- The Last Super Bowl
- Extreme Behavior in Aspen
- Billionaire Swine and Kiwi Catastrophe
- Fleeced by Ed Bradley
- Love Blooms in the Rockies
- Love in a Time of War
- A Sad Week in America
- The Doomed Prefer Oakland
- The Tragedy of Naked Bowling
- West Coast Offense
- Great Fleecing in Woody Creek: Lakers Staggered in Series Opener
- The Sport of Kings
- The Good, the Bad, and the Vicious
- Rewarding the Ugly
- Killed by a Speeding Hummer
- When in Doubt, Bet the Dark Side
- Welcome to the Big Darkness
- The Nation's Capital
- Speed Kills and Other Football Wisdom
- Nightmare in Hollywood
- Speed Will Rule the NFL This Year
- The Bush League
- Boxing Sucks
- George Plimpton
- Victory
- Wisdom

Honor Roll
