= Murder in Wyoming law =

Murder in Wyoming law constitutes the intentional killing, under circumstances defined by law, of people within or under the jurisdiction of the U.S. state of Wyoming.

The United States Centers for Disease Control and Prevention reported that in the year 2020, the state had a murder rate well below the median for the entire country.

== Felony murder rule ==
For the felony murder rule in all U.S. jurisdictions, see felony murder rule.

In the state of Wyoming the common law felony murder rule is codified at W.S. 6-2-101(a). This rule provides that anyone who kills another human being during the perpetration or attempted perpetration of a sexual assault, arson, robbery, burglary, escape, resisting arrest, or kidnapping is guilty of first degree murder. The Wyoming Supreme Court has clarified this by stating that the intent necessary to be convicted under the felony murder rule is only the intent that is necessary for the underlying crime.

== Penalties ==
Offense	Mandatory sentencing
Criminally negligent homicide	Up to 1 year in jail
Homicide by vehicle	Up to 1 year in jail
Drug-induced homicide	Up to 20 years in prison
Aggravated homicide by vehicle	Up to 20 years in prison
Manslaughter	Up to 20 years in prison
Second degree murder	Minimum of 20 years and maximum of life (minimum set by judge; can only be parole by governor if no minimum set)
First degree murder if defendant was a juvenile	Life (minimum of 25 years)
First degree murder	Death (aggravating circumstances), life without parole, or life (can only be paroled by governor)
