= Federal Correctional Institution, Memphis =

Medium-security prison in Tennessee, US

Coordinates: 35°09′20″N 89°52′02″W

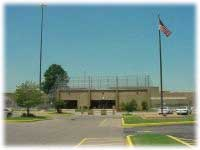
- Interactive map of Federal Correctional Institution, Memphis
- Location: Memphis, Tennessee
- Status: Operational
- Security class: Low-security (with minimum-security prison camp)
- Population: 1,160 (330 in prison camp)
- Managed by: Federal Bureau of Prisons
- Warden: F.J. Bowers

The Federal Correctional Institution, Memphis (FCI Memphis) is a low-security United States federal prison for male inmates located in Memphis, Tennessee. It is operated by the Federal Bureau of Prisons, a division of the United States Department of Justice. It also includes a satellite prison camp for minimum-security male offenders.

== Notable incidents ==
In early 2012, a joint investigation conducted by the FBI, the Bureau of Prisons, and the Department of Justice Inspector General found that several inmates at FCI Memphis, identified as Mark Evans, Vincent West, Tyrone Bryant, David Chambers and Larry Burse, operated a marijuana ring from FCI Memphis that spanned three states - Tennessee, Louisiana, and Texas - between September 2009 and May 2010. Evans received shipments of marijuana through the prison kitchen, brought into the prison by a corrupt food services employee, Debra Thompson. Evans or his fellow inmates would then distribute the marijuana to other prisoners for up to $900 an ounce. Inmates purchasing the marijuana would send money orders to the wife of Evans’ top marijuana wholesaler in Shreveport, Louisiana. The money orders were converted to cash and disbursed to Evans’ family members in Texas and also to two post office boxes in Memphis, Tennessee opened up at the behest of the corrupt food services employee.

This operation generated at least $85,000 during the course of the conspiracy. Evans, the ringleader of the operation, was found guilty of conspiracy to distribute marijuana in August 2012 and faces up to ten years additional years of incarceration. Members of Evans’ family, his fellow inmate co-conspirators and the food services employee all agreed to plead guilty and testify in return for the possibility of reduced sentences.

== Notable inmates ==
- Mitchell Johnson and Andrew Golden, perpetrators of the 1998 Westside Middle School shooting
- Joseph Chase Winkle (Register Number: 17517-028), Former Muncie, Indiana Police Officer serving 10 years. Plead guilty to eleven civil rights and obstruction offenses for assaulting arrestees and writing false reports.
- Ron Hansen - Former Defense Intelligence Officer who is serving a 10-year sentence for attempting to communicate, deliver, or transmit information involving the national defense of the United States to the People’s Republic of China. Is scheduled for release in September 2026.

== See also ==
- List of U.S. federal prisons
- Federal Bureau of Prisons
- Incarceration in the United States
