= Hey, Rube! =

19th century American circus slang

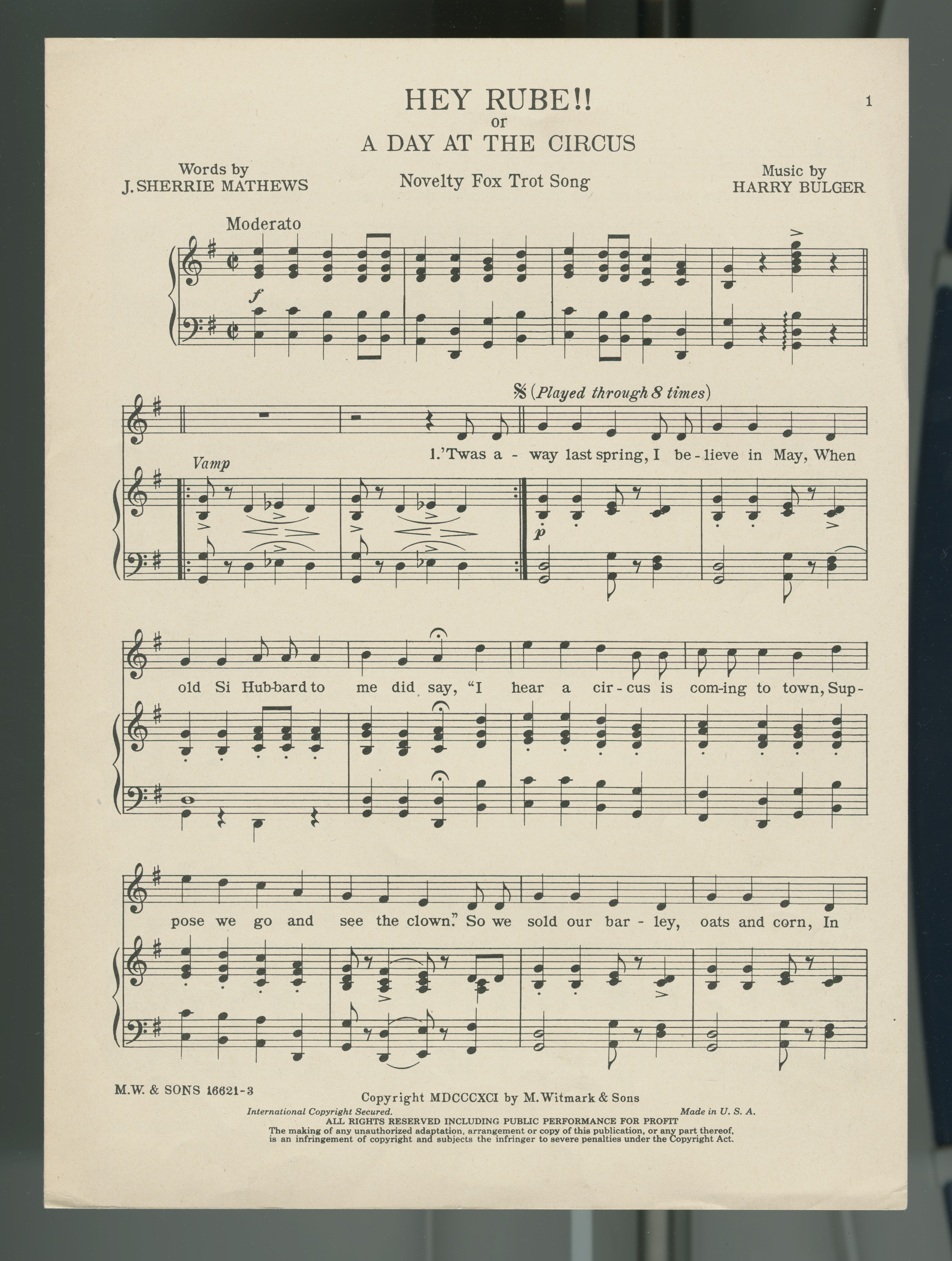
1891 sheet music for "Hey Rube!! or, A Day at the Circus"

"Hey, Rube!" is a slang phrase most commonly used in the United States by circus and traveling carnival workers ("carnies"), with origins in the middle of the 19th century. It is a rallying call, or a cry for help, used by carnies in a fight with outsiders. It is also sometimes used to refer to such a fight: "The clown got a black eye in a Hey, Rube."

In the early days of circuses in America (c. 1800–1860), it was very common for circus folk to get into fights with the locals as they travelled from town to town. Circuses were rowdy, loud, and often lewd affairs, where country people could gather, blow off steam, and voice political views. Mark Twain's classic description of a circus and other shows in his 1884 novel Adventures of Huckleberry Finn provides illustration. It was a rare show that did not include at least some violence, and this often involved the members of the circus.

When a carnie was attacked or in trouble, he would yell "Hey, Rube!" and all carnies within earshot would rush to his aid. Circus pioneer and legendary clown Dan Rice called it "a terrible cry, [meaning] as no other expression in the language does, that a fierce deadly fight is on, that men who are far away from home [travelling circus workers] must band together in a struggle that means life or death to them." "Hey, Rube!" is still the safety phrase used by many modern theatrical performers to alert security of a violent audience member, especially in outdoor or festival environments where entertainers are in close proximity with large numbers of intoxicated patrons.

The origin of the expression can possibly be traced to 1848 when a member of Dan Rice's troupe was attacked at a New Orleans dance house. That man yelled to his friend, named "Reuben", who rushed to his aid. Another potential explanation is that the name "Rube" is a slang term for country folk (e.g., "Rustic Reubens"), usually shortened to "rubes".

The Oxford English Dictionary's first entry for "Hey, Rube!" is from 1882, in the Chicago Times (3 Dec. Suppl. 12/4): "A canvasman watching a tent is just like a man watching his home. He'll fight in a minute if the outsider cuts the canvas, and if a crowd comes to quarrel he will yell, ‘Hey Rube!’ That's the circus rallying cry, and look out for war when you hear it."

The term is still known and used today in circuses, but usually as an allusion to the "glory days" when circuses were rowdy affairs, rather than in actual fights.

== Other uses ==
- Hey, Rube! was the title of a 1921 American silent comedy short film starring Bobby Vernon and Helen Darling.
- During World War II, "Hey Rube!" was the open-microphone radio call issued by Combat Air Directors on American aircraft carriers to alert USN fighters to prepare to defend a task force from enemy air-attack.
- American author Hunter S. Thompson (1937–2005) wrote a web sports column called "Hey, Rube", for ESPN "Page 2," which was later compiled into a book called Hey Rube: Blood Sport, the Bush Doctrine, and the Downward Spiral of Dumbness Modern History from the Sports Desk (2005).
- During the 1980s the United States Navy conducted a periodic electronic warfare exercise code-named Hey Rube.
- In the Dungeons & Dragons role-playing adventure module The Keep on the Borderlands (1979), the goblin enemies shout the phrase "Bree-Yark" when attacked. The author, Gary Gygax indicated that this translated as "Hey Rube!"

== See also ==
- Dog whistle (politics)
