= Murder in New Hampshire law =

Murder in New Hampshire law constitutes the intentional killing, under circumstances defined by law, of people within or under the jurisdiction of the U.S. state of New Hampshire.

The United States Centers for Disease Control and Prevention reported that in the year 2020, the state had the lowest murder rate in the country, in a near tie with Vermont.

== Felony murder rule ==
In the state of New Hampshire, the common law formulation of the felony murder rule has been replaced by the Model Penal Code's formulation of the rule.

The felony murder rule is codified as a form of second-degree murder, at RSA 630:1-b, I(b).

== Penalties ==
Offense	Mandatory sentencing
Causing or aiding suicide	Up to 7 years in prison (Note: For aiding or assisting in a suicide or suicide attempt without causing the suicide or attempt, up to one year in jail.)
Negligent homicide	7 1/2 to 17 years in prison
Manslaughter	Up to 30 years in prison
Second-degree murder	30 to 40 years in prison, or life imprisonment with the possibility of parole
First-degree murder	Life imprisonment without the possibility of parole
