= People v. Aaron =

- Court: Michigan Supreme Court
- Full case name: People of the State of Michigan v. Stephen J. Aaron
- Decided: November 24, 1980
- Citation: 299 N.W.2d 304; 409 Mich. 672

Case history
- Appealed from: Michigan Court of Appeals

Court membership
- Judges sitting: Kavanagh • Williams • Coleman • Levin • Fitzgerald • Ryan • Moody

Case opinions
- Held: (1) Murder in Michigan is common-law murder; the elements of murder are established solely by case law. (2) Felony-murder requires malice equivalent to murder, is thus redundant, and is therefore abolished.
- Decision by: Fitzgerald
- Concurrence: Williams
- Concur/dissent: Ryan

People v. Aaron, 299 N.W.2d 304 (1980), was a case decided by the Michigan Supreme Court that abandoned the felony-murder rule in that state. The court reasoned that the rule should only be used in grading a murder as either first or second degree, and that the automatic assignment of the mens rea of the felony as sufficient for the mens rea of first degree murder was indefensible.

Michigan is unique among states that have abolished the felony-murder rule entirely in doing so by judicial decision. This was acceptable because, unlike most other states, the felony-murder rule, and indeed the definition of murder itself, was entirely a common law offense, i.e. inherited from English judge-made common law. Michigan's criminal code did have statute on murder, but as the court noted, it merely defined the criteria under which a murder would be considered a first-degree murder and therefore opened the defendant to harsher punishment (specifically mandating life imprisonment as the penalty, Michigan having abolished the death penalty for ordinary crimes in 1846).
