= Murder in Alabama law =

Intentional homicides in Alabama

Murder in Alabama law constitutes the intentional killing, under circumstances defined by law, of people within or under the jurisdiction of the U.S. state of Alabama.

The United States Centers for Disease Control and Prevention reported that in the year 2020, Alabama had the third-highest rate of homicides in the country.

== Felony murder rule ==
In Alabama, the common law felony murder rule has been codified in Alabama Code § 13A-6-2(a)(3). It provides that when a person commits various crimes and "in the course of and in furtherance of the crime" another is killed, then the perpetrator is guilty of murder, a "Class A Felony", the punishment of which is not less than 10 years nor more than 99 years in prison, or life in prison. If any aggravating circumstances were present, the penalty is death or life imprisonment.

== Penalties ==
Offense	Mandatory sentencing
Manslaughter	2–20 years in prison
Murder	10–99 years in prison (20–99 years if a deadly weapon is used) or life-with-parole
Capital murder	Death or life imprisonment without the possibility of parole
