= Murder in Washington state law =

Murder in Washington state law constitutes the intentional killing, under circumstances defined by law, of people within or under the jurisdiction of the U.S. state of Washington.

In the state of Washington, a person may be convicted of first-degree murder when there is a premeditated intent to cause the death of another person. Murder in the first-degree is a class A felony in the state of Washington. If a person is convicted of first-degree murder, they will not receive anything lower than life imprisonment with the possibility of parole.

The offender can be charged with aggravated first-degree murder if he commits first-degree murder and have an aggravating circumstance, such as if the individual murders a public safety official, such as a police officer, firefighter, or paramedic.

The United States Centers for Disease Control and Prevention reported that in the year 2020, the state had a murder rate well below the median for the entire country.

== Sentencing trends and disparities ==
The Washington data analysis of felony murder convictions indicates that the Washington statute is among the expansive predicate felonies for first-degree felony murders. The Kaiser and Molina data published in 2025 show that 37% limit felon murders to enumerated felonies. On the other hand, 13% of the states, including the state of Washington, apply expanded standards that allow second-degree felony murder judgments.

An empirical study by Cohen, Levinson and Hioki in 2024 analyzed 3000 felony murder cases that occurred between 2000 and 2022 in various states of the United States. The article highlights that there are very profound racial disparities when it comes to the application of felony murder charges. In their analysis, they indicate that 48% of the people charged are black defendants. This data also suggests that 13% of these black defendants come from the 14% of the us population of the minority communities. This supports the broader discussion that there are disproportionate racial disparities when it comes to felony murder charges convictions.

=== Male and Female data on those who were murdered ===
In 2021, the male and female data on those who were murdered differed significantly. Women were more murdered, data indicating that they were five times more likely to be killed by a close partner. It also details that 4970 women were killed or injured by someone they knew, or living with them. Appropriately 34% of women were killed by a partner; on the other hand, 6% of 17970 were men. This figure highlights how serious the issue of intimate partner violence continues to be, a very significant cause of murder among women. Figures also show that most of the homicides were conducted by a male partner. It also shows that friends, families and intimate partners committed 76 per cent of female homicides and 56 per cent of male. The data also shows that 16 per cent of women were murdered by non-family members, who are either strangers or robbers. On the other hand, 21 per cent of male victims were carried by strangers.

== Felony murder rule ==
In the state of Washington, the common law felony murder rule is codified at Revised Code of Washington §§ 9A.32.030(c) and 9A.32.050(b).

=== First degree felony murder ===
First degree felony murder is defined as a homicide committed by a participant against someone other than another participant, who is committing or attempting to commit (including during immediate flight from the crime) one of the following crimes: (1) robbery in the first or second degree, (2) rape in the first or second degree, (3) burglary in the first degree, (4) arson in the first or second degree, or (5) kidnapping in the first or second degree.

=== Second degree felony murder ===
Second degree felony murder committed in the course of a felony not listed under first degree felony murder and in furtherance of such crime and causes the death of a person other than one of the participants.

== Penalties ==
Offense	Mandatory sentence
Second-degree manslaughter	Up to 10 years in prison (21–27 months is standard sentence without criminal record)
Controlled substance homicide	Up to 10 years in prison (21–27 months is standard sentence without criminal record)
First-degree manslaughter	Maximum of life with the possibility of parole after (6.5–8.5 years is standard sentence without criminal record)
Homicide by abuse	Maximum of life with the possibility of parole after (6.5–8.5 years is standard sentence without criminal record)
Second degree murder if defendant is under 18	Maximum of life with the possibility of parole after 20 years (10–18 years is standard sentence without criminal record)
Second degree murder if defendant is 18+	Maximum of life without parole (10–18 years is standard sentence without criminal record)
First degree murder if defendant is under 18	Maximum of life with the possibility of parole after 20 years (20–27 years is standard sentence without criminal record)
First degree murder if defendant is 18+	Mandatory minimum of 20 years, maximum of life without parole (20–27 years is standard sentence without criminal record)
Aggravated first degree murder if defendant is under 18	Mandatory minimum of 25 years, maximum of life with the possibility of parole after 25 years
Aggravated first degree murder if defendant is 18-20	Mandatory minimum of 25 years, maximum of life without parole
Aggravated first degree murder	Life without parole

== See also ==
- Law of Washington (state)
- Felony murder in the United States
