= Enmund v. Florida =

- Supreme Court of the United States

Argued March 23, 1982 Decided July 2, 1982
- Full case name: Earl Enmund v. State of Florida
- Citations: 458 U.S. 782 (more) 102 S. Ct. 3368; 73 L. Ed. 2d 1140

Case history
- Prior: Conviction and sentence upheld by the Supreme Court of Florida, 399 So. 2d 1362 (Fla. 1981); cert. granted, 454 U.S. 939 (1981).

Holding
- The Eighth Amendment's prohibition of cruel and unusual punishment does not allow the death penalty for a person who is involved in a felony in the course of which a murder is committed but does not kill, attempt to kill, or intend for a killing to take place.

Court membership
- Chief Justice Warren E. Burger Associate Justices William J. Brennan Jr. · Byron White; Thurgood Marshall · Harry Blackmun; Lewis F. Powell Jr. · William Rehnquist; John P. Stevens · Sandra Day O'Connor

Case opinions
- Majority: White, joined by Brennan, Marshall, Blackmun, Stevens
- Concurrence: Brennan
- Dissent: O'Connor, joined by Burger, Powell, Rehnquist

Laws applied
- U.S. Const. amend. VIII

Enmund v. Florida, 458 U.S. 782 (1982), is a United States Supreme Court case. It was a 5–4 decision in which the United States Supreme Court applied its capital proportionality principle, to set aside the death penalty for the driver of a getaway car, in a robbery-murder of an elderly Floridian couple. The court ruled that the imposition of the death penalty under the felony murder rule when the defendant did not intentionally kill the victim constituted cruel and unusual punishment under the Eighth Amendment of the United States constitution.

== Background ==
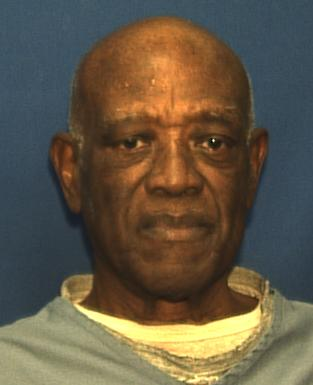
Earl Enmund

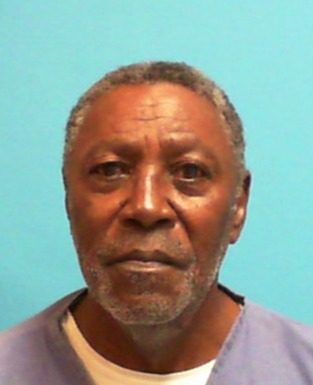
Sampson Armstrong

While Earl Enmund sat outside in the getaway car, his accomplices Sampson and Jeanette Armstrong rang the doorbell of Thomas and Eunice Kersey, who lived at a farmhouse in Central Florida. When Thomas Kersey answered, Sampson Armstrong held him at gunpoint while Jeanette took his money. Eunice came out with a gun and shot Jeanette, wounding her. Sampson shot back and killed both of the Kerseys. The Armstrongs took all the Kerseys' money and then went back to the getaway car Enmund was driving.

Enmund and the Armstrongs were indicted for first-degree murder and robbery. The judge instructed the jury that under Florida law, killing a human being while engaged in the perpetration or in the attempt to perpetrate a robbery is first-degree murder. Jeanette and Sampson Armstrong were convicted of first-degree murder. At a separate penalty hearing, the trial judge found that the murders were committed for pecuniary gain and were especially heinous, atrocious, or cruel, and no statutory mitigating factors applied, and then sentenced Enmund to death. On appeal, the Florida Supreme Court rejected Enmund's contention that his death sentence was inappropriate because he did not kill or intend to kill the Kerseys. It held that the "felony murder rule and the law of principals combine to make a felon generally responsible for the lethal acts of his co-felon."

== Opinion of the Court ==
Justice White delivered the opinion of the Court. The question before the Court was whether death is a valid penalty under the Eighth and Fourteenth Amendments for one who neither took life, attempted to take life, nor intended to take life. The majority found that the record did not support a finding that Enmund killed or attempted to kill the Kerseys, and the record did not support a finding that Enmund intended to participate in the killing or facilitate the killing. Accordingly, the Court held the imposition of a sentence of death upon Enmund was prohibited by the Eighth Amendment's prohibition of cruel and unusual punishment because Enmund only "aided and abetted a felony in the course of which a murder is committed by others but who does not himself kill, attempt to kill, or intend that a killing take place or that lethal force will be employed." The court cited Lockett v. Ohio which held that individualized consideration was required by the Constitutional before imposing the death penalty: "The focus must be on his culpability, not on that of those who committed the robbery and shot the victims".

=== Concurring opinion ===
Justice Brennan delivered a concurring opinion and stated that the death penalty is a cruel and unusual punishment prohibited by the Eighth Amendment in all circumstances.

=== Dissent ===
Justice O'Connor, joined by Chief Justice Burger, Justice Powell, and Justice Rehnquist, delivered the dissenting opinion, on the basis that the majority opinion interferes with state criteria for assessing intent, and creates an Eighth Amendment meaning of intent limited to intent-to-kill:

Thus, while proportionality requires a nexus between the punishment imposed and the defendant's blameworthiness, the Court fails to explain why the Eighth Amendment concept of proportionality requires rejection of standards of blameworthiness based on other levels of intent

Justice O'Connor said the court's proportionality analysis in Coker v. Georgia concluded that "[rape] does not compare with murder", and the Eighth Amendment requires the punishment to fit the crime, as well as the defendant's moral blameworthiness for that crime. She said in this case two lives were unjustifiably taken, and as an accomplice to the robbery she concluded that Enmund was at least partially responsible for their deaths. However, she said she would have remanded the case for a new sentencing hearing because the trial court had not considered the argument that Enmund's role in the killings was too minor for capital punishment as a mitigating circumstance.

== See also ==
- Tison v. Arizona
- Felony murder and the death penalty in the United States
