= Lawrence Mira =

American lawyer and jurist (born 1942)

Lawrence Joseph Mira (born August 9, 1942) is an American lawyer and jurist who is currently serving as a judge for the Los Angeles County Superior Court. Known by some as "Judge to the Stars", Mira's name has been mentioned in numerous high-profile and celebrity arrests due to the region his courtroom serves.

Mira attended Loyola Marymount University for both his undergraduate studies and law school, then was admitted to the bar in August 1970 and practiced criminal law both privately and as a deputy district attorney. In 1986, he was appointed by Governor George Deukmejian as a judge for the Malibu Municipal Court. He was challenged by a local attorney in 1988 who was dissatisfied with his administration of the municipal court, but won that election and remained a municipal court judge until the municipal courts in Los Angeles County were merged with the Superior Court in 2000. As part of the unification process, he became a judge for the Superior Court, while continuing to be assigned to Malibu. In the 2012 election, he faced no opposition and consequently was reelected to a new six-year term.

== Notable defendants ==
- Brandon Hein
- Robert Downey Jr.
- Nick Nolte
- Charlie Sheen
- Tommy Lee
- Nicole Richie
- Mel Gibson
- Nick Gessner
