= Ryan v R =

Australian court case

Ryan v The Queen
- Court: High Court of Australia
- Decided: 3 March 1967
- Citation: [1967] HCA 2, (1967) 121 CLR 205, (1967) 40 ALJR 488, [1967] ALR 577, 1967 WL 22945
- Transcript: Original judgement

Case history
- Appealed from: NSWSC

Case opinions
- Application for special leave to appeal refused Appeal failed

Ryan v The Queen (abbreviated to Ryan v R) is a seminal case in Australian criminal law. The case is an application to the High Court of Australia for special leave to appeal a conviction for murder. It is often cited in cases of felony murder (referred to as constructive murder in Australian law) and when the issue of voluntariness is in question.

== Facts ==
On March 10, 1965, Robert Patrick Ryan and his accomplice, Mr White, committed an armed robbery of a service station in Carramar, New South Wales. White would act as the getaway using a motorcycle, while Ryan would carry out the robbery proper using a sawn-off rifle. Mimicking a book he had read, Ryan planned to tie the service attendant up before absconding. While tying up the service attendant, Noel Francis Taylor, the rifle discharged, a bullet penetrated Taylor's neck and caused Taylor's death.

Ryan claimed the discharged of the rifle was accidental and that he was culpable for manslaughter, not murder. Under the doctrine of common purpose, White was also liable for Taylor's death, but was offered and accepted a plea of guilty of manslaughter. Ryan's manslaughter plea was refused by the prosecution and he was convicted of murder at trial. At the time, murder in New South Wales carried a mandatory minimum sentence of life imprisonment with the harshest sentence being death. Ryan received the former.

== Judgement ==
Under New South Wales law, a conviction of murder requires that the death of the victim be caused by a voluntary action of the accused, that is to say a willful and deliberate action, and that the action be done with malice. Generally, the law will not hold people accountable for involuntary actions such as spasms, sneezes or twitches. While Ryan claimed that the pulling of the rifle trigger was an involuntary action and there was no way for the prosecution to prove otherwise, the actions that lead up to the discharge were voluntary: loading the gun, presenting it to menace the attendant, and pointing it at the victims neck.

New South Wales follows a modified version of the felony murder rule, wherein the prosecution does not need to prove malice to convict for murder if the death is caused "in an attempt to commit, or during or immediately after the commission, by the accused, or some accomplice with him, of a crime punishable by death or penal servitude for life." Since Ryan's actions and Taylor's death occurred during and as the result of an armed robbery, which at the time was punishable with life imprisonment, the felony murder rule applied.

The High Court unanimously ruled that Ryan's application for special leave be refused. Subsequently, his conviction for murder and life sentence were upheld.

== See also ==
- Woolmington v DPP
- Murder in Australian law
- Malice aforethought
- Voluntariness
