= Murder in Kentucky law =

Murder in Kentucky law constitutes the intentional killing, under circumstances defined by law, of people within or under the jurisdiction of the U.S. state of Kentucky.

The United States Centers for Disease Control and Prevention reported that in the year 2020, the state had a murder rate well above the median for the entire country.

== Felony murder rule ==
In the state of Kentucky, the common law felony murder rule has been completely abolished.

=== KRS § 507.020 ===
The Kentucky General Assembly abolished the felony murder rule with the enactment of Kentucky Revised Statutes § 507.020. Recognizing that an automatic application of the rule could result in conviction of murder without a culpable mindset, the Kentucky Legislature instead allowed the circumstances of a case, like the commission of a felony, to be considered separately. The facts of each case would be used to show the mental state of the defendant instead of using an automatic rule.

== Penalties ==
Offense	Mandatory sentencing
Murder (aggravating circumstances)	Death penalty (de jure) (Note: Capital punishment in Kentucky has been indefinitely suspended by court order since 2009.) or; Life imprisonment without the possibility of parole or; Life imprisonment without the possibility for 25 years
Murder (no aggravating circumstances)	Life (minimum of 20 years) or 20 to 50 years in prison
First degree manslaughter	10 to 20 years in prison
Second degree manslaughter	5 to 10 years in prison
Reckless homicide	1 to 5 years in prison
