= Murder in Oregon law =

Murder in Oregon law constitutes the intentional killing, under circumstances defined by law, of people within or under the jurisdiction of the U.S. state of Oregon.

The United States Centers for Disease Control and Prevention reported that in the year 2020, the state had a murder rate well below the median for the entire country.

== Felony murder rule ==
In the state of Oregon, the common law felony murder rule has been codified in Oregon Revised Statutes § 163.115.

=== Murder ===
Under § 163.115, anyone in a group or alone that commits or attempts to commit a predicate felony, and in furtherance of the crime or in the immediate flight therefrom causes the death of a person other than one of the participants is guilty of murder. The predicate felonies are:

- Arson in the first degree
- Criminal mischief in the first degree by means of an explosive
- Burglary in the first degree
- Escape in the first degree
- Kidnapping in the first or second degree
- Robbery in the first degree
- Any felony sexual offense in the first degree
- Compelling prostitution
- Assault in the first or second degree against a victim younger than 14

=== Affirmative defenses ===
§ 163.115(3) provides affirmative defenses to murder under the felony murder rule. It is an affirmative defense that the defendant:

- Was not the only participant in the underlying crime;
- Did not commit or solicit the homicidal act;
- Was not armed by a deadly weapon;
- Had no reasonable ground to believe that any other participant was armed with a deadly weapon; and
- Had no reasonable ground to believe that any other participant intended to engage in conduct likely to result in death.

== Penalties ==
Offense	Mandatory sentencing
Assisting suicide (non-euthanasia)	Up to 10 years in prison
Criminally negligent homicide	Up to 10 years in prison
Second-degree manslaughter	Up to 10 years in prison
Aggravated vehicular homicide	Up to 20 years in prison
First-degree manslaughter	Up to 20 years in prison
Second degree murder	Life (minimum of 25 years; 15 years if the defendant was a juvenile)
First degree murder	Life without parole or life (minimum of 30 years for adults, 15 years if the defendant was under 18 and only an option)
Aggravated murder	Death, life without parole, or life (minimum of 30 years for adults, 15 years if the defendant was under 18 and only an option)
