= Murder in New Mexico law =

Homicide in New Mexico law constitutes the intentional killing, under circumstances defined by law, of people within or under the jurisdiction of the U.S. state of New Mexico

The United States Centers for Disease Control and Prevention reported that in the year 2021, the state had the fourth highest murder rate in the country

== Felony murderthird ==
In the state of New Mexico, the common law felony murder rule is codified in N.M. Stat. Ann. § 30-2-1(2).

The rule was narrowed in the case of State v. Ortega, where the court held that the perpetrator must have the same mens rea as one who commits murder.

== Penalties ==
Offense	Mandatory sentencing
Involuntary manslaughter	Up to 1 1/2 years in prison
Voluntary manslaughter	Up to 6 years in prison
Second-degree murder	Up to 18 years in prison
Child abuse resulting in death	Up to life imprisonment
First-degree murder	Life imprisonment without the possibility of parole, or life-with-parole after 30 years
