= Murder in West Virginia law =

Murder in West Virginia law constitutes the intentional killing, under circumstances defined by law, of people within or under the jurisdiction of the U.S. state of West Virginia.

The United States Centers for Disease Control and Prevention reported that in the year 2020, the state had a murder rate near the median for the entire country.

== Felony murder rule ==
In the state of West Virginia the common law felony murder rule is codified at W. Va. Code § 61-2-1 (1991). This statute provides that someone kills another during the commission of, or attempt to commit arson, kidnapping, sexual assault, robbery, burglary, breaking and entering, escape from lawful custody, or a felony offense of manufacturing or delivering a controlled substance shall be guilty of first degree murder.

== Penalties ==
| Offense | Mandatory sentencing |
|---|---|
| Involuntary manslaughter | Up to 1 year in jail |
| Voluntary manslaughter | 3 to 15 years in prison |
| Second-degree murder | 10 to 40 years in prison |
| First-degree murder | Life imprisonment without the possibility of parole, or life-with-parole after 15 years |
