= Unring the bell =

Legal analogy

In law, unring the bell is an analogy used to suggest the difficulty of forgetting information once it is known. When discussing jury trials, the phrase is sometimes used to describe the judge's instructions to the jury to ignore inadmissible evidence or statements they have heard. It may also be used if inadmissible evidence has been brought before a jury and the judge subsequently declares a mistrial.

Commenting on Court TV about the pre-trial release of nearly 200 pages of documents from a hearing on the sexual activities of the accuser in the Kobe Bryant sexual assault case, jury consultant Idgi D'Andrea said, "It's really hard to unring the bell, once that bell has been rung, and ask people to forget what they've heard." In a more recent case, judge Reggie Walton said that he could not "unring the bell" when he declared a mistrial in the Roger Clemens perjury trial.

== In Oregon v. Rader ==
One of the earliest reported legal references to unringing a bell can be found in the Oregon Supreme Court case State v. Rader, 62 Ore. 37; 124 P. 195, argued on May 9, 1912, and decided on May 28, 1912.

In that case, the defendant, Frederick Rader, indicted as Fritz Rader, was tried and convicted of the crime of arson for allegedly burning two haystacks. The prosecution's theory was that Rader did so in retaliation for the victim reporting another crime (that Rader had cut off the tail of one of the victim's cows). At trial, the victim was permitted to testify concerning Rader's alleged tail-cutting. The court ruled that improper testimony had been admitted and it constituted a reversible error. Chief Justice McBride noted (at p. 40):

While in some cases an express instruction to the jury to disregard testimony injuriously admitted is properly held to cure the error, the courts are cautious in the application of this rule. It is not an easy task to unring a bell, nor to remove from the mind an impression once firmly imprinted there, and the withdrawal of the testimony should be so emphatic as to leave no doubt in the mind of the juror as to the unequivocal repudiation by the court of the erroneously admitted matter, and even then, in a case where the testimony is evenly balanced or contradictory, courts hesitate to sanction such withdrawal, though it seems necessary to permit this course in some instances.

== In USA v Lowis ==
The phrase also appears several times in the ruling of the United States Court of Appeals for the Seventh Circuit in the case USA v Lowis, 174 F.3d 881, 885 (7th Cir. 1999). Gary Lowis was arrested for possession of amphetamine and marijuana. Between that arrest and the subsequent trial, he was arrested a second time on similar charges. Before the trial in the United States District Court on the first arrest, the judge granted a defense motion to exclude evidence of the second arrest. However, during testimony, a police witness quoted a statement made by Lowis after the second arrest. The judge later instructed the jury to disregard that portion of the evidence.

Lowis appealed his subsequent conviction, arguing, among other things, that the statements were so prejudicial to him that despite the judge's best efforts in instructing the jury to disregard that evidence, as a practical matter it was impossible to "unring the bell". Addressing the evidence admitted in error, the appeals court wrote that that evidence was "not a very loud bell" and the judge's instructions to the jury were adequate to "unring" it. Lowis' conviction was upheld.

In its ruling in USA v Lowis, the appeals court provided some background and mentioned a few other phrases (citations removed):

"Unring the bell" is a good analogy which can save a lot of words in making the point. That phrase originated, as far as we can find, in Sandez v. United States [1956], and was elaborated on in Dunn v. United States, which added other pertinent analogies. "After the thrust of the saber it is difficult to forget the wound," was another, and then the most colorful one of all, "If you throw a skunk into the jury box, you can't instruct the jury not to smell it." In the present case there was no skunk thrown in the jury box. As also mentioned in Dunn, "Trials are rarely, if ever, perfect, but gross imperfections should not go unnoticed." We find no gross imperfections which would overpower the district court's instruction to the jury to disregard Lowis' statement.
