= Murder in Kansas law =

Murder in Kansas law constitutes the intentional killing, under circumstances defined by law, of people within or under the jurisdiction of the U.S. state of Kansas.

The United States Centers for Disease Control and Prevention reported that in the year 2020, the state had a murder rate near the median for the entire country.

== Felony murder rule ==
In Kansas, the common law felony murder rule has been codified in K.S.A. 21-3401. The statute defines first degree murder as, among other things, homicide in the commission of, attempt to commit, or escape from an inherently dangerous felony. Inherently dangerous felonies are defined in K.S.A. 21-3436 and include armed robbery, arson, and aggravated burglary. A felony murder conviction in Kansas carries a mandatory life sentence without the possibility of parole for 25 years.

In the case State v. Hoang, 243 Kan. 40 (1988), the Supreme Court of Kansas held that the accidental death of a co-felon during the commission of arson could support a felony murder conviction.

In the case State v. Sophophone, 270 Kan. 703 (2001), the Supreme Court of Kansas held that a felony murder conviction could not be supported if the co-felon was killed by lawful attempts at apprehension by a police officer.

== Penalties ==
Offense	Mandatory sentencing
Unintentional second-degree murder	9 to 41 years in prison
Intentional second-degree murder	12 1/2 to 54 years in prison
Felony first-degree murder	Life imprisonment with the possibility of parole after 25 years
Premeditated first-degree murder	Life imprisonment with the possibility of parole after 25 or 50 years
Capital murder	Death or life imprisonment without the possibility of parole
