= State v. Yanz =

- Court: Connecticut Supreme Court of Errors
- Full case name: The State of Connecticut v. George Yanz
- Decided: September 27, 1901
- Citation: 74 Conn. 177; 50 A. 37; 1901 Conn. LEXIS 91

Court membership
- Judges sitting: Andrews, Torrance, Baldwin, Hamersley, Hall

Case opinions
- Decision by: Baldwin
- Concurrence: Torrance and Hall
- Dissent: Andrews and Hamersley

State v. Yanz, 50 A. 37 (Conn. 1901), was a case decided by the Supreme Court of Connecticut (then called the Connecticut Supreme Court of Errors) that held that a provocation defense that reduced a murder charge to one of manslaughter is still valid even in the presence of a reasonable mistake of fact. Specifically, in the case where a man reasonably believed his wife was committing adultery and kills her alleged paramour, even where that belief was mistaken, the provocation would be enough to reduce the charge from murder to manslaughter.

== Facts and procedural background ==
George Yanz, an employee at the Winchester Repeating Arms factory, left work early on June 20, 1900 after noticing his co-worker, machinist George H. Goering had left early. Yanz suspected that Goering was having an affair with Yanz's wife Kitty, and went to his home in the Highwood neighborhood of Hamden, Connecticut. Yanz, discovering his wife and Goering "in a compromising position", took his Winchester rifle and shot Goering in the head, killing him. Yanz surrendered himself to police the same afternoon.

Yanz was arraigned June 22, and held without bail. He initially claimed that he did not realize the person he was shooting was Goering, and that he initially believed he was protecting his wife against a rapist. Public opinion at the time was that he was claiming this to defend his wife's reputation. Yanz was indicted for murder by the grand jury, and his case was deferred to October. The trial began the second week of October, with closing arguments held the morning of October 17. That afternoon, the jury found Yanz guilty of second degree murder after two hours of deliberation, and he was sentenced to life imprisonment.

At least one contemporary report noted that public opinion was on Yanz's side in his motion for a new trial.

== Appeal and aftermath ==
In a 3-2 decision, the Supreme Court of Errors overturned the conviction, ordering a new trial. The majority opinion, authored by Justice Baldwin and joined by Justices Torrance and Hall, held that there was error in the jury instructions that led to an improper conviction. The basis for this decision rested upon four factors. First, Connecticut's statute defining murder in the second degree required "implied malice". Second, the court applied State v. Johnson, 41 Conn. 584 (1874), holding that malice cannot be implied where "the fatal act was the sudden result of what the law deems either a sufficient provocation or an uncontrollable passion naturally excited by the circumstances of the occasion". Third, the court held that Yanz's discovery of his wife with a paramour would have amounted to such sufficient provocation. Finally, even if Yanz had believed Goering was his wife's paramour, but been reasonably mistaken in that belief, the charge of second degree murder would still be reduced to manslaughter.

Justice Hamersley dissented from the majority, and was joined by Chief Justice Andrews. The main point of disagreement was on the effect of a reasonable mistake on a defendant's part as to whether the act he witnessed was in fact adultery: The dissent argued that in the presence of a reasonable mistake, the crime would still be murder.

After his conviction was vacated and a new trial ordered, Yanz entered a plea of guilty to manslaughter on October 16, 1901. He was sentenced to five years in prison.
