= Murder in Hawaii law =

Murder in Hawaii law constitutes the intentional killing, under circumstances defined by law, of people within or under the jurisdiction of the U.S. state of Hawaii.

The United States Centers for Disease Control and Prevention reported that in the year 2020, the state had a murder rate well below the median for the entire country.

== Elements ==
A first-degree murder involves one or more specific elements:

- Multiple victims killed
- A public safety official, such as a police officer, firefighter, or paramedic/EMT
- A judge or prosecutor killed (in connection with their respective duties)
- A witness in a criminal case killed (in connection with the person being a witness)
- Murder committed for hire (with the charge applying to both the murderer and the person who paid the murderer)
- Murder committed by an imprisoned person
- Murder committed under organized crime (refer to RICO act)

== Felony murder rule ==
In Hawaii, the common law felony murder rule has been completely abolished. In Hawaii Revised Statutes §707-701, the Hawaii State Legislature noted the critical history of the felony murder rule and the severe limitation of it in the Model Penal Code. The legislature determined that the commission of a felony should not serve to automatically classify an offense as murder, and that a separate factual inquiry should be undertaken for each case to determine the significance of a felony on the severity of the offense.

== Penalties ==
Offense	Mandatory sentencing
Second-degree murder	Life imprisonment with the possibility of parole; Possible life-without-parole for repeat offenders
First-degree murder	Life imprisonment without the possibility of parole; Possible commuting of sentence by governor to life imprisonment with parole at the end of twenty years of imprisonment
