= Murder in Colorado law =

Aspect of Colorado law

Murder in Colorado law constitutes the unlawful killing, under circumstances defined by law, of people within or under the jurisdiction of the U.S. state of Colorado.

The United States Centers for Disease Control and Prevention reported that in the year 2020, the state had a murder rate somewhat below the median for the entire country.

== Definitions ==
=== First-degree murder ===
There are several types of first-degree murder in Colorado, those being:

- Intentionally killing another person with premeditation
- Committing perjury leading to an innocent person's execution
- Causing the death of another person caused by the perpetrator's extreme indifference to the value of human life
- Distributing a drug to a minor on school grounds causing the minor's death
- Knowingly causing the death of a child under the age of 12 when the perpetrator was in a position of trust over the child

First-degree murder in Colorado carries a mandatory sentence of life imprisonment without the possibility of parole. The death penalty is possible for intentional first-degree murder if the crime was committed before July 1, 2020. Following Colorado abolishing the death penalty for all crimes after that date, Governor Jared Polis commuted all of Colorado's remaining death row prisoners' sentences to life-without-parole.

=== Second-degree murder ===
Second-degree murder is defined as intentionally causing the death of another person without premeditation, and that the killing was not in the heat-of-passion, or causing the death of another person during the commission or attempted commission of a felony under Colorado's felony murder rule. It is punishable by 16 to 48 years in prison.

==== Felony murder rule ====
In Colorado, the common law felony murder rule has been codified in Colorado Revised Statutes § 18-3-103. As of September 15, 2021, the statute classifies a homicide as second degree murder when committed during one of these predicate felonies:

- Committing or attempting to commit arson, robbery, burglary, kidnapping, sexual assault, or a class 3 felony sexual assault on a child
- Or if in the course of one of these crimes or the immediate escape from it, anyone causes the death of a person other than one of the participants

For the reason above, Colorado's felony murder rule is unique compared to some other states' felony murder rules, in that it does not allow a person to be charged with felony murder if the person that died during the felony was a co-conspirator to the felony.

=== Heat-of-passion second-degree murder ===
Heat-of-passion second-degree murder is defined as a mitigated version of intentional second-degree murder, in which the perpetrator intentionally caused the death of another person in the sudden heat-of-passion, commonly known in other jurisdictions as voluntary manslaughter. It is punishable by 4 to 12 years in prison.

== Penalties ==
Offense	Mandatory sentencing
Criminally negligent homicide	Probation, or 1 to 3 years in prison
Manslaughter	2 to 6 years in prison
Second-degree vehicular homicide	2 to 6 years in prison
First-degree vehicular homicide	4 to 12 years in prison
Heat-of-passion second-degree murder	4 to 12 years in prison
Second-degree murder	16 to 48 years in prison
First degree murder if the defendant was a juvenile	Life with parole eligibility after 40 years (eligible for parole after 20-25 years if certain prison programs completed)
First-degree murder	Life imprisonment without the possibility of parole or; Death if the murder was intentional and occurred before July 1, 2020

== See also ==
- Law of Colorado
