= Murder in Alaska law =

Felony murder rule in Alaska

Murder in Alaska law constitutes the intentional killing, under circumstances defined by law, of people within or under the jurisdiction of the U.S. state of Alaska.

The United States Centers for Disease Control and Prevention reported that in the year 2020, the state had a murder rate near the median for the entire country.

== Felony murder rule ==
In the state of Alaska, the common law felony murder rule is codified in Alaska Statutes § 11.41.100(a). Alaska's law regarding felony murder is very specific, and unlike most felony murder rule laws, which make all felony crimes that cause murder that of the first degree, delegates some felony murders to second degree murder.

=== First degree murder ===
Alaska makes the following offenses equate to first degree murder if they result in death:

- Sexual offenses and kidnapping of a child under 16
- Criminal Mischief in the first degree
- Terroristic Threatening in the first degree

=== Second degree murder ===
The following offenses equate to second degree murder if they result in death:

- Arson in the first degree
- All other Kidnapping
- Sexual Assault in the first and second degrees
- Burglary in the first degree
- Escape in the first or second degrees
- Robbery
- Misconduct involving a controlled substance
- Acting to commit a felony with a street gang
- Criminal negligence involving a child under 16, if that person had been convicted before under certain specific crimes involving a child under 16

This is enumerated entirely at Alaska Statute Sec. 11.41.100(a)(2)-(5) (first degree murder) and 11.41.110(a)(3)-(5) (second degree murder).

== Penalties ==
| Offense | Mandatory sentencing |
|---|---|
| Second-degree murder | 5–99 years |
| First-degree murder or second-degree murder of an unborn child | 30–99 years |
| First-degree murder with aggravating factor | 99 years without parole (can apply for a one-time reduction after 49.5 years; for juveniles, a judge can sentence them to 99 years and the governor can parole them) |
