= Murder in Arkansas law =

Murder in Arkansas law constitutes the intentional killing, under circumstances defined by law, of people within or under the jurisdiction of the U.S. state of Arkansas.

The United States Centers for Disease Control and Prevention reported that in the year 2020, the state had one of the highest murder rates in the country.

== Felony murder rule ==
In the state of Arkansas, the felony murder rule is defined as a death that is caused "in the course of", "in the furtherance of" or "in the immediate flight" of a felony. These deaths all must exhibit "extreme indifference to the value of human life" to qualify. The following predicate felonies are crimes when causing death automatically qualify the perpetrator for capital punishment in Arkansas:

- Terrorism
- Rape
- Kidnapping
- Vehicular piracy
- Robbery or aggravated robbery
- Residential or aggravated residential burglary
- Commercial burglary
- Felonies involving delivery of a controlled substance
- Escape of the first degree
- Arson

This is found in Arkansas Code, under capital punishment.

The remaining felonies that result in death of another are classified as first degree murder. This is known as a "Class Y Felony" which carries a minimum prison term of ten years to a maximum of life. If the defendant was under 18 at the time of offense, a judge sets out a life sentence and they are eligible for parole after 30 years. For the remaining felonies, juveniles are eligible for parole after 25 years.

== Penalties ==
Offense	Mandatory sentencing
Second-degree murder	6–30 years
First-degree murder	10–40 years or life without parole (eligible for parole after 25 years if the defendant was a juvenile)
Capital murder	Death or life without parole (eligible for parole after 30 years if the defendant was a juvenile)
