= Murder in Arizona law =

Criminal statute

Murder in Arizona law constitutes the intentional killing, under circumstances defined by law, of people within or under the jurisdiction of the U.S. state of Arizona.

In Arizona, a person is charged with murder when the offender knowingly and intentionally causes the death of a person or unborn child. The murder must be premeditated. In the state of Arizona, if one is found guilty of first-degree murder, there is the possibility of receiving the death penalty.

The United States Centers for Disease Control and Prevention reported that in the year 2020, the state had a murder rate near the median for the entire country.

== Felony murder rule ==
Arizona abolished all common law criminal concepts and replaced them with criminal statutes. The felony murder rule survives in Arizona by current statutory law. The felony murder rule holds that a killing of a person occurring in the course of, or in the immediate flight from, the commission of the following crimes is considered murder in the first degree:

- Sexual Conduct with a minor
- Sexual Assault
- Molestation of a child
- Terrorism
- Marijuana offenses
- Dangerous drug offenses
- Narcotics offenses
- The use of minors in drug offenses
- Drive by shooting
- Kidnapping
- Burglary
- Arson
- Robbery
- Escape
- Child abuse
- Unlawful flight from a pursuing law enforcement vehicle

A person convicted of murder in the first degree faces possible sentences of life imprisonment or, when aggravating factors exist, the death penalty.

== Penalties ==
Offense	Mandatory sentencing
Negligent homicide	1–3.75 years (first violent felony offense)
Manslaughter	7–21 years (first violent felony offense)
Second degree murder	10–25 years (first violent felony offense)
Felony first degree murder	Death (aggravating circumstances), natural life imprisonment, or life (minimum of 25 years; 35 years if the victim was under the age of 15)
Premeditated first degree murder	Death (aggravating circumstances), natural life imprisonment, or life (minimum of 25 years; 35 years if the victim was under the age of 15; only an option if the defendant was a juvenile)
