= Felony murder rule in California =

In the state of California, a heavily modified version of the common law felony murder rule is codified in California Penal Code § 189.

== Circumstances ==
Since the enactment of Senate Bill 1437 on September 30, 2018, felony murder can only be prosecuted in certain specific circumstances if at least one of these is true:

- The defendant directly killed a person.
- The defendant, with the intent to have the victim killed, "aided, abetted, counseled, commanded, induced, solicited, requested, or assisted" the actual killer.
- The defendant was a major participant in the underlying felony and acted with reckless indifference to human life.
- The victim was a peace officer who was killed while in the course of the peace officer's duties, where the defendant knew or reasonably should have known that the victim was a peace officer engaged in the performance of their duties, during the commission, attempted commission, or flight of an inherently dangerous felony.

Felony murder is a theory of murder, not a charge, thus felony murder is punished as first degree murder if committed during any of these enumerated felonies.

- Pen. Code, § 451 (Arson).
- Id., § 261 (Rape).
- Id., § 215 (Carjacking).
- Id., § 211 (Robbery).
- Id., § 459 (Burglary).
- Id., § 203 (Mayhem).
- Id., § 207 (Kidnapping).
- Id., § 219 (Train-wrecking).
- Id., § 206 (Torture).
- Id., § 286 (Unlawful Sodomy).
- Id., § 288 (Lewd Acts with a minor).
- Id., § 289 (Forcible penetration with a foreign object).

Under Penal Code Section 190.2, “special circumstances”, all murders committed during the commission, attempted commission, or immediate flight of any of the listed felonies also qualify as a special circumstance for the charge of first degree murder with special circumstances. Thus, all felony murder charges will also be special circumstances murder unless the felony was merely committed for furthering the murder with the exception of arson and kidnapping. (However, for a defendant that was not the actual killer, in order for special circumstances to be found true the jury has to find that the defendant intended to someone to be killed.) (For example, Person A murders Person B, and steals Person B's belongings in order to hide the body. Although Person A is guilty of felony murder and robbery, Person A is not guilty of the special circumstance as the robbery was committed to facilitate the murder.) The two exceptions to these are arson and kidnapping. Any murder committed during the commission, attempted commission, or flight of these felonies fall under special circumstances regardless of the situation.

Felony murder can also be prosecuted for felonies not in this list, provided the felony is “inherently dangerous”. Whether a felony is inherently dangerous or not is done on a case-by-case basis and is found by the jury. Felonies that are inherently dangerous but not included in the above list are punished under PC 187, second degree murder.

== Escape rule ==
In March 2013, the California Supreme Court held, in People v. Wilkins (2013) 56 Cal.4th 333, as modified (May 1, 2013), a burglary is complete for purposes of the felony murder rule where death resulted from a negligent act committed while actively engaged in a burglary. Wilkins committed a burglary. On the way from the burglary, unsecured items fell from his pickup truck, causing another driver to swerve and become involved in a fatal collision. The Court set aside the conviction, which had been upheld by the Court of Appeals, reaffirming the escape rule in which a defendant is deemed to have completed a burglary when he escapes from the scene, is no longer being chased, and has unchallenged possession of the property.

== Inherently dangerous felonies ==
In People v. Ford (1964) 60 Cal.2d 772, overruled by People v. Satchell (1971) 6 Cal.3d 28, the California Supreme Court held that homicide during the commission of a felony can constitute second degree murder if the felony is "inherently dangerous to human life."

In People v. Hansen (1994) 9 Cal.4th 300, overruled by People v. Chun (2009) 45 Cal.4th 1172, the California Supreme Court held that discharging a firearm at an inhabited dwelling is an inherently dangerous felony for the purposes of second degree felony murder.

In People v. Jones (2000) 82 Cal.App.4th 663, a California Appeals court held that the charge of evading a police officer causing death was not an acceptable felony under the felony murder rule, as the offense was a felony specifically because it caused the death of a pedestrian. California courts have also found manufacturing methamphetamine, maliciously burning a car, and possessing a bomb in a residential area to be inherently dangerous felonies.
