= Manslaughter (United States law) =

Crime in the United States

Manslaughter is a crime in the United States. Definitions can vary among jurisdictions, but manslaughter is invariably the act of causing the death of another person in a manner less culpable than murder. Three types of unlawful killings constitute manslaughter. First, there is voluntary manslaughter which is an intentional homicide committed in "sudden heat of passion" as the result of adequate provocation. Second, there is the form of involuntary manslaughter which is an unintentional homicide that was committed in a criminally negligent manner. Finally, there is the form of involuntary manslaughter which is an unintentional homicide that occurred during the commission or attempted commission of an unlawful act which does not amount to a felony (thereby triggering the felony-murder rule).

== Laws in the United States ==
=== Voluntary manslaughter ===
Voluntary manslaughter involves the intentional killing of a person in which the offender did not have prior intent to kill. The defendant may have the intention of causing serious injury short of death.

The following are some examples of defenses that may be raised to mitigate murder to voluntary manslaughter:

==== Provocation ====
A killing that occurs after adequate provocation by an event which would cause a reasonable person to lose self-control is voluntary manslaughter. There must not be a cooling off period negating provocation. If there is an interval between the provocation and killing sufficient to allow the passion of a reasonable person to cool, the homicide is not manslaughter, but murder.

In the United States, jurisdictions vary on what counts as adequate provocation. Traditionally, there were five categories which constituted adequate provocation: (1) observation of sexual marital infidelity, (2) assault and battery, (3) mutual combat, (4) witnessing harm to a loved one, and (5) resistance to an illegal arrest. Courts have since moved on to less restrictive rules which look at whether the provocation was of such a nature that it would cause an ordinary person to enter a heightened state of passion and lose their self-control. Nonetheless, regardless of the rule used to determine adequate provocation, under the common law words alone are almost always never enough. However, that does not apply to jurisdictions which use the Model Penal Code.

==== Imperfect self-defense ====
In some jurisdictions, a person who acted in self-defense with an honest but unreasonable belief that deadly force was necessary to do so can reduce a murder charge to one of voluntary manslaughter or deliberate homicide committed without criminal malice. (Malice is found if a person is killed intentionally and without legal excuse or mitigation.)

==== Diminished capacity ====
Diminished capacity is a defense that may negate the mental state of "malice". If a jurisdiction recognizes that a person can kill without justification but also without any evil intent, for example due to a mental defect or mental illness, that jurisdiction may define the person's crime as something less than murder. This partial defense is only available in some U.S. jurisdictions and not others; whereas the complete defense of insanity is available throughout the U.S. but is rarely used because it is more difficult to prove.

=== Involuntary manslaughter ===
Involuntary manslaughter is the killing of another person without the intent to kill, but where the person's death occurs as a result of the negligent or reckless actions of the defendant.

==== Constructive manslaughter ====
In the United States, constructive manslaughter, also known as unlawful act manslaughter, is a lesser version of felony murder, and covers a person who causes the death of another while committing a misdemeanor – that is, a violation of law that does not rise to the level of a felony. Such a law may allow for conviction for the homicide if the misdemeanor law that was violated by the defendant is a law designed to protect human life.

==== Criminally negligent manslaughter ====
In some U.S. jurisdictions, if a person is so reckless as to "manifest extreme indifference to human life", the defendant may be guilty of aggravated assault as well as of involuntary manslaughter.

In some U.S. jurisdictions, malice may be found only if the defendant's actions reflect willful or depraved indifference to human life. In such a case, even though the injury to the victim was not intended, the wrongdoer may be guilty of second degree murder.

==== Vehicular manslaughter ====
Vehicular manslaughter is a criminal charge that may be imposed upon a person who causes a death through criminal negligence, or a violation of certain traffic safety laws. A common use of the vehicular manslaughter laws involves prosecution for a death caused by driving under the influence of intoxicating substances (determined by excessive blood alcohol content levels set by individual U.S. states), although an independent infraction (such as driving with a suspended driver's license), or negligence, is usually also required.

In Wisconsin, a person who causes death with any type of motor vehicle while legally intoxicated may be liable and charged with homicide by intoxicated use of a motor vehicle. Culpability lies with the perpetrator. The maximum penalty for homicide by intoxicated use of a vehicle is twenty-five years in prison, but with a prior OWI offense the maximum penalty may be increased to forty years in prison.

In the State of Texas, intoxication manslaughter is a distinctly defined offense. A person commits intoxication manslaughter if he, or she, operates a motor vehicle in a public place, operates an aircraft, a watercraft, or an amusement ride, or assembles a mobile amusement ride while intoxicated and, by reason of that intoxication, causes the death of another by accident or mistake.

Intoxication manslaughter, vehicular manslaughter and other similar offenses require a lesser mens rea than other manslaughter offenses. Furthermore, the fact that the defendant is entitled to use the alcohol, controlled substance, drug, dangerous drug, or other substance, is no defense. For example, to prove intoxication manslaughter, it is not necessary to prove the person was negligent in causing the death of another, nor that they unlawfully used the substance that intoxicated them, but only that they were intoxicated, and operated a motor vehicle, and someone died as a result.

The same principle of strict liability applies in New York for vehicular manslaughter in the second degree.

==== Assisted suicide ====
In some U.S. states, assisted suicide is punishable as manslaughter, while others classify it as an independent criminal offense or as a form of murder.

=== Terminology ===
As each state has its own statutes, law that cover the same criminal conduct may have different names. For example:

- New York State defines manslaughter in the first degree as conduct that causes a death with intent to cause serious physical injury, a definition that corresponds to "voluntary manslaughter" in most other states. If the defendant's intent was to cause death, the charge would be murder.
- New York defines manslaughter in the second degree as a death that occurs without intent to cause serious physical injury, but where reckless conduct by the defendant resulted in death. This corresponds to "involuntary manslaughter" in most other states.

== Case law ==
- State v. Anderson (1804)
- State v. Yanz (Conn. 1901)

== See also ==
- Manslaughter in English law
- Causing death by criminal negligence, for motor manslaughter penalties under Canadian criminal law
