= Hunter S. Thompson bibliography =

Hunter Stockton Thompson
- Born: July 18, 1937; Louisville, Kentucky, USA
- Died: February 20, 2005 (aged 67); Woody Creek, Colorado, USA

Bibliography of works by American author and journalist Hunter S. Thompson (July 18, 1937 – February 20, 2005).

== Books ==
Thompson's books include:

Hell's Angels: The Strange and Terrible Saga of the Outlaw Motorcycle Gangs

- Random House, 1967, (Trade Cloth)
- Random House Publishing Group, 1975, ISBN 0-345-24825-2 (Mass Market)
- Random House Publishing Group, 1980, ISBN 0-345-29238-3 (Mass Market)
- Random House Publishing Group, 1981, ISBN 0-345-30113-7 (Mass Market)
- Random House Publishing Group, 1985, ISBN 0-345-33148-6 (Mass Market)
- Random House Publishing Group, 1996, ISBN 0-345-41008-4 (Trade Paper)
- Random House Publishing Group, 1999, ISBN 0-679-60331-X (Trade Cloth)

Fear and Loathing in Las Vegas

- Random House, 1971, ISBN 0-394-46435-4 (Trade Cloth)
- Warner Books, 1985, ISBN 0-446-31393-9 (Mass Market)
- Knopf Publishing Group, 1989, ISBN 0-679-72419-2 (Trade Paper)
- Knopf Publishing Group, 1998, ISBN 0-679-78589-2 (Trade Paper)
- Recorded Books LLC, 2005, ISBN 1-4193-6336-0 (Audio Cassette)
- Recorded Books LLC, 2005, ISBN 1-4193-6338-7 (Compact Disc)
- Recorded Books LLC, 2005, ISBN 1-4193-5627-5 (Compact Disc)

Fear and Loathing on the Campaign Trail '72

- San Francisco, Straight Arrow Books, 1973
- Grand Central Publishing, 1985, ISBN 0-446-31364-5 (Trade Paper)
- Grand Central Publishing, 2006, ISBN 0-446-69822-9 (Trade Paper)

Gonzo Papers, Vol. 1: The Great Shark Hunt: Strange Tales from a Strange Time

- Summit Books, 1979, ISBN 0-671-40046-0 (Trade Cloth)
- Warner Books, 1982, ISBN 0-446-31034-4 (Mass Market)
- Warner Books, 1986, ISBN 0-446-31440-4 (Mass Market)
- Random House Publishing Group, 1992, ISBN 0-345-37482-7 (Trade Paper)
- Simon & Schuster, 2003, ISBN 0-7432-5045-1 (Trade Paper)

The Curse of Lono, illustrated by Ralph Steadman

- Bantam Books, 1983, ISBN 0-553-34354-8 (Trade Paper)
- Bantam Books, 1983, ISBN 0-553-34523-0 (Trade Paper)
- Bantam Books, 1983, ISBN 0-553-01387-4 (Trade Paper)
- Taschen America, 2005, ISBN 3-8228-4897-2 (Trade Cloth)
- Taschen America, 2005, ISBN 3-8228-3656-7 (Trade Cloth; Box or Slipcase)

Gonzo Papers, Vol. 2: Generation of Swine: Tales of Shame and Degradation in the '80s

- Summit Books, 1988, ISBN 0-671-66147-7 (Trade Cloth)
- Knopf Publishing Group, 1989, ISBN 0-679-72237-8 (Trade Paper)
- Random House Value Publishing, 1991, ISBN 0-517-07504-0 (Trade Cloth)
- Simon & Schuster, 2003, ISBN 0-7432-5044-3 (Trade Paper)

Gonzo Papers, Vol. 3: Songs of the Doomed: More Notes on the Death of the American Dream

- Simon & Schuster, 1990, ISBN 0-671-42018-6 (Trade Cloth)
- Simon & Schuster Audio, 1990, ISBN 0-671-72634-X (Audio Cassette)
- Simon & Schuster, 1991, ISBN 0-671-74413-5 (Trade Paper)
- Simon & Schuster Audio, 1994, ISBN 0-671-50265-4 (Audio Cassette)
- Simon & Schuster, 2002, ISBN 0-7432-4099-5 (Trade Paper)
- Simon & Schuster Audio, 2004, ISBN (Audio Recording Downloadable)

Gonzo Papers, Vol. 4: Better Than Sex: Confessions of a Political Junkie

- Random House Publishing Group, 1994, ISBN 0-679-42447-4 (Trade Cloth)
- Random House Publishing Group, 1995, ISBN 0-345-39635-9 (Trade Paper)
- Random House Value Publishing, 1996, ISBN 0-517-17162-7 (Trade Cloth)
- Transworld Publishers Limited, 2000, ISBN 0-552-99638-6 (Trade Paper)

The Fear and Loathing Letters, Vol. 1: The Proud Highway: The Saga of a Desperate Southern Gentleman 1955–1967

- Random House, 1997, ISBN 0-375-75020-7 (Trade Paper)
- Random House Publishing Group, 1997, ISBN 0-679-40695-6 (Trade Cloth)
- Random House Publishing Group, 1997, ISBN 0-679-45285-0 (Trade Cloth)
- Random House Publishing Group, 1998, ISBN 0-345-37796-6 (Trade Paper)
- Random House Value Publishing, 1999, ISBN 0-517-45503-X (Trade Cloth)

The Rum Diary

- Simon & Schuster, 1998, ISBN 0-684-85521-6 (Trade Cloth)
- Simon & Schuster, 1998, ISBN 0-684-85224-1 (Trade Paper)
- Simon & Schuster, 1999, ISBN 0-684-85647-6 (Trade Paper)
- Simon & Schuster, 1999, ISBN 0-671-03352-2 (Audio Cassette)

Screw-Jack

- Simon & Schuster, 2000, ISBN 0-684-87321-4 (Trade Cloth)
- Simon & Schuster, 2000, ISBN 0-7432-1523-0 (E-Book)
- SoftBook Press, n.d., ISBN 0-7410-0325-2 (E-Book)
- SoftBook Press, n.d., ISBN 0-7410-0305-8 (E-Book)
- Adobe Systems, n.d., ISBN 1-931208-92-1 (E-Book)
- Adobe Systems, n.d., ISBN 1-931208-91-3 (E-Book)

Mistah Leary – He Dead

- X-Ray Book Company, 1996, (chapbook)

Fear and Loathing in America: The Brutal Odyssey of an Outlaw Journalist 1968–1976

- Simon & Schuster, 2000, ISBN 0-684-87315-X (Trade Cloth)
- Simon & Schuster, 2001, ISBN 0-7432-1926-0 (Trade Cloth)
- Simon & Schuster, 2001, ISBN 0-684-87316-8 (Trade Paper)

Kingdom of Fear: Loathsome Secrets of a Star-Crossed Child in the Final Days of the American Century

- Simon & Schuster, 2003, ISBN 0-684-87324-9 (Trade Paper)
- Simon & Schuster, 2003, ISBN 0-684-87323-0 (Trade Cloth)
- Simon & Schuster, 2003, ISBN 0-684-87324-9 (Trade Cloth)

Hey Rube: Blood Sport, the Bush Doctrine, and the Downward Spiral of Dumbness Modern History from the Sports Desk

- Simon & Schuster, 2004, ISBN 0-684-87319-2 (Trade Cloth)
- Simon & Schuster, 2005, ISBN 0-684-87320-6 (Trade Paper)

Gonzo: Photographs by Hunter S. Thompson

- AMMO Books, 2006, ISBN 0-9786076-0-0 (Perfect; Paper over boards)

Happy Birthday, Jack Nicholson

- Penguin Books, 2005, Ltd ISBN 0-14-102243-4 (Trade Cloth)

Fear and Loathing at Rolling Stone: The Essential Writings of Hunter S. Thompson

- Simon & Schuster, 2011, ISBN 9781439165959 (Trade Cloth)

== Selected articles ==
Thompson wrote many articles over the course of his career, for publications including Rolling Stone, Esquire, The Boston Globe, Chicago Tribune, New York Times, The San Francisco Examiner, Time, Vanity Fair, The San Juan Star, and Playboy. Only his most important articles are listed.

Rolling Stone

ISSN 0035-791X

- Freak Power in the Rockies (The Battle of Aspen) – October 1, 1970 (No. 67, pp. 30–37)
- Strange Rumblings in Aztlan – April 29, 1971 (No. 81, pp. 30–37)
- Memo From the Sports Desk: The So-Called "Jesus Freak Scare" (as Raoul Duke) – November 11, 1971 (No. 90, p. 24)
- Fear and Loathing in Las Vegas: A Savage Journey to the Heart of the American Dream (as Raoul Duke) – November 11, 1971 (No. 95, pp. 36–48)
- Conclusion of Fear and Loathing in Las Vegas: A Savage Journey to the Heart of the American Dream (as Raoul Duke) – November 25, 1971 (No. 96, pp. 38–50)
- He Was A Crook (The Death of Richard Nixon) - June 16, 1994 (no. 684)

Scanlan's Monthly

ISSN 0036-5661

- The Temptations of Jean-Claude Killy — March 1970 (Volume 1, Issue 1, pp. 89–100)
- The Kentucky Derby Is Decadent and Depraved – June 1970 (Volume 1, Issue 4, pp. 1–12)

Playboy

ISSN 0032-1478

- The Great Shark Hunt – December 1974 (Volume 21, Issue 12, pp. 183–184)
- The Curse of Lono (book excerpt) – 1983

== Miscellany ==
"Song of the Sausage Creature", Cycle World, March 1995.

- "Fire in the Nuts". Gonzo International/Steam Press/Petro III Graphics/Sylph Publications, 2004 (Limited edition of 176 copies). Republished in the third issue of The Woody Creeker.
- Liner Notes – The Big Sky Singers Self-Titled debut album on Dot Records, 1964.
- Introduction – America by Ralph Steadman, Straight Arrow. 1974
- Introduction – Autobiography of a Brown Buffalo by Oscar Zeta Acosta 1989 Edition. Vintage ISBN 0-679-72213-0
- Introduction – Revolt of the Cockroach People by Oscar Zeta Acosta 1989 Edition. Vintage ISBN 0-679-72212-2
- Foreword – Gonzo: The Art by Ralph Steadman, Harcourt Brace. 1998. ISBN 0-15-100387-4.
- You're a Whole Different Person When You're Scared – cowritten with Warren Zevon on the album My Ride's Here. 2001.
- Foreword – The Boys on the Bus by Timothy Crouse, Random House. 2003 Trade Paperback Edition. ISBN 978-0-8129-6820-0 (0-8129-6820-4).S"

== Known unpublished works ==
- Short Stories – Thompson wrote numerous short stories during the late 1950s and early 1960s, most of which were rejected by literary magazines at the time. Douglas Brinkley, Thompson's literary executor, told an interviewer that many of them are quite good, and that a collection is in the works.
- Prince Jellyfish – Thompson's first novel, written in the early 1960s. A short excerpt was printed in Songs of the Doomed.
- The Joint Chiefs or The Death of the American Dream – Thompson's letters from 1968 mention a book on the death of the American dream that was never published because he wasn't satisfied with the manuscript, calling it "a pile of shit".
- Fear and Loathing in Las Vegas: Extra Chapters – Two chapters written for the book were not included in the final text. One has the "coconut smashing scene" that was shown in the film adaptation of Fear and Loathing in Las Vegas. Brinkley told an interviewer that he did not understand why the chapters were cut, as they are extremely funny and fit very well with the rest of the book. (Rolling Stone may have cut them because of space, but that doesn't explain why they weren't in the book.) He said he hopes they will be released in the near future.
- The Gun Lobby – Brinkley describes the 250-page manuscript as "Fear and Loathing at the NRA". Thompson wrote the story for Esquire magazine, but the manuscript got shoved in a drawer for decades. Brinkley says he hopes to have it published soon.
- The Night Manager – A non-fiction novel about Thompson's time at the O'Farrell Theater strip club in San Francisco. Originally an assignment to write about "couples pornography" for Playboy.
- Polo Is My Life – Thompson described this novel as "...a sex book — you know, sex, drugs and rock and roll. It's about the manager of a sex theater who's forced to leave and flee to the mountains. He falls in love and gets in even more trouble than he was in, in the sex theater in San Francisco". It was slated to be released by Random House in 1999, and was even assigned ISBN 0-679-40694-8, but was never published.

== Sources ==
- Joel Parham (2006). Hunter S Thompson: A Bibliography
