= Eric Boehlert =

American writer (1965–2022)

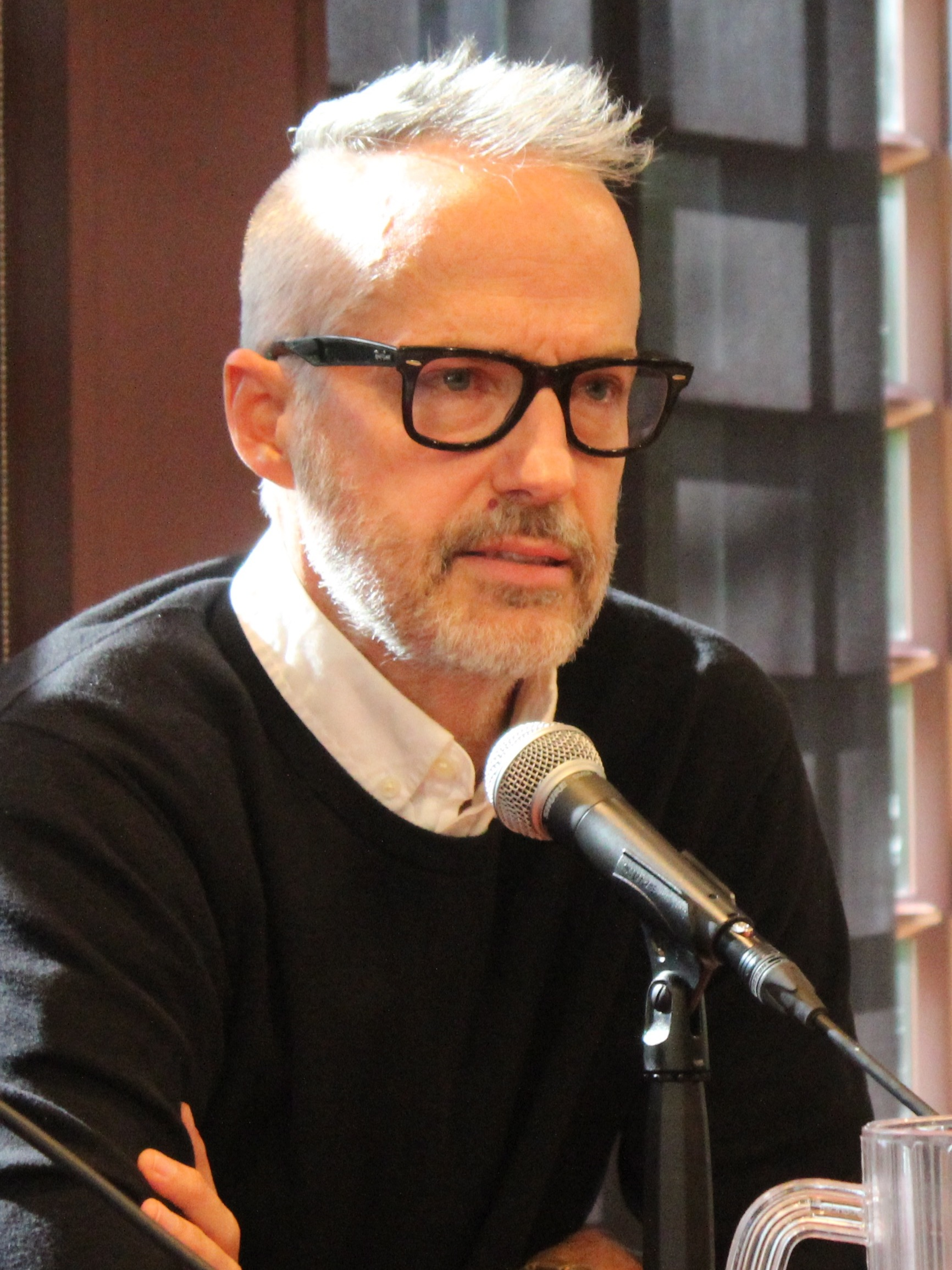
- Boehlert in 2019
- Born: December 6, 1965; Utica, New York, U.S.
- Died: April 4, 2022 (aged 56); Montclair, New Jersey, U.S.
- Education: University of Massachusetts Amherst
- Occupations: Journalist; media critic
- Spouse: Tracy Breslin
- Children: 2

Eric Boehlert (December 6, 1965 – April 4, 2022) was an American journalist, writer, and media critic. He was a senior fellow at Media Matters for America for ten years and a staff writer at both Salon and Billboard.

In 2020, Boehlert started a digital newsletter, Press Run, as a venue for his commentary. He described it as "an unfiltered, passionate, and proudly progressive critique of the political press in the age of Trump."

== Early life and education ==
Boehlert was born on December 6, 1965, in Utica, New York. As a child, Boehlert lived with his family in Indiana before moving to Guilford, Connecticut. He had three siblings, Bart, Thom, and Cynthia. Standing 6 feet 4 inches (193 cm) in height, he played guard on his high school basketball team.

Boehlert attended the University of Massachusetts Amherst, where he received a bachelor's degree in Middle Eastern Studies in 1988.

== Career ==
As a music writer, Boehlert was a contributing editor to Rolling Stone and was hired as a senior staff writer at Billboard in 1992. He later became a senior writer at Salon, a news and opinion website. Writing at Billboard, Boehlert investigated corporate malfeasance in the music business. When Pearl Jam filed a complaint with the U.S. Justice Department against Ticketmaster in 1994, Boehlert wrote a series of reports, many of which were featured on the front page of Billboard.

At Salon, Boehlert won the 2002 American Society of Composers, Authors, and Publishers' Deems Taylor Award for music journalism for a series of articles in 2001 on the radio industry, in which he wrote about Clear Channel Communications' dominance of the radio and concert businesses. The series was also shortlisted for the Gerald Loeb Award for Distinguished Business and Financial Journalism.

External videos
- Presentation by Boehlert on Lapdogs, July 19, 2006, C-SPAN

In 2006, Boehlert joined Media Matters for America (MMFA), a content analysis organization. The same year, Boehlert released his book Lapdogs: How the Press Rolled Over for Bush, where he argued that the mainstream press insufficiently scrutinized the George W. Bush administration. His 2009 book, Bloggers on the Bus, covered the emergence of blogging in U.S. politics. Its title plays on the title of Timothy Crouse's The Boys on the Bus (1973) that details life on the road for reporters covering the presidential campaign during 1972.

Boehlert was a vocal critic of both Donald Trump and the media coverage surrounding him. Boehlert remained at MMFA for ten years, eventually being promoted to senior fellow, before launching his own online newsletter, Press Run, on the Substack platform in 2020. He wrote that he started the liberal newsletter because "we can't fix America if we don't fix the press", and in February 2020 he declared, "When a radical White House player is eagerly chipping away at our freedoms and the Constitution, we need the press to stand up to the unprecedented challenge at hand—a press corps that doesn't wallow in 'Both Sides' journalism as a way to escape the wrath from Republicans." In his thrice-weekly commentaries, Boehlert frequently contended that reporters for many publications, especially The New York Times, were unfairly critical of Democrats while being overly deferential toward Republicans. In his final article for Press Run, published on the day he died, he questioned coverage by journalists of the Biden administration, writing that the news media was minimizing the achievements of the president.

== Personal life and death ==
Boehlert was married to Tracy Breslin for 29 years and they had two children. He lived in Montclair, New Jersey, where he was an avid cyclist and his wife said that he often biked at night, wearing reflective gear and using lights on his bicycle. While biking on the evening of April 4, 2022, he was struck and killed by an eastbound NJ Transit train that was coming into Watchung Avenue station in Montclair. Investigators said on April 11 that the safety equipment at the train station was working properly at the time of the crash. A spokesman for NJ Transit confirmed that the lights were flashing and the gates were down, saying, "The investigation indicated that safety mechanisms were working as intended at North Fullerton".

== Legacy ==
He was memorialized by commentator Soledad O'Brien, who called him a "fierce and fearless defender of the truth", and former Secretary of State Hillary Clinton, who praised his "critical work to counteract misinformation and media bias". Historian Heather Cox Richardson lamented the loss of his criticism of what he identified as the misguided focus of media during a crucial period in a battle between democracy and authoritarianism, both nationally and internationally.

== Books ==
- Boehlert, Eric (2006). Lapdogs: How the Press Rolled over for Bush. New York: Free Press. ISBN 9780743289313.
- Boehlert, Eric (2009). Bloggers on the Bus: How the Internet Changed Politics and the Press. Riverside: Free Press. ISBN 9781416560357.
