= Fear and Loathing in America =

2000 book by Hunter S. Thompson

- First edition
- Author: Hunter S. Thompson
- Language: English
- Publisher: Simon & Schuster
- Publication date: 2000
- Publication place: United States
- Pages: 784
- ISBN: 0-684-87315-X
- OCLC: 63717046
- Dewey Decimal: 070/.92 B 21
- LC Class: PN4874.T444 A3 2000
- Preceded by: The Fear and Loathing Letters, Vol. 1: The Proud Highway: The Saga of a Desperate Southern Gentleman 1955–1967

Fear and Loathing in America: The Brutal Odyssey of an Outlaw Journalist 1968–1976 is a collection of hundreds of letters Hunter S. Thompson wrote (as well as a handful he received) after his rise to fame with his 1967 book Hell's Angels. These letters deal primarily with Thompson and his editor at Random House, Jim Silberman, his correspondence with Oscar Zeta Acosta, and his perpetually fluctuating relationship with Jann Wenner, the founder of Rolling Stone.

Throughout this time period, Thompson discusses Fear and Loathing in Las Vegas, Fear and Loathing on the Campaign Trail '72, and his unending desire to see his then-unpublished novel The Rum Diary made into a film.
