= Martin Nolan (journalist) =

American journalist

Martin F. Nolan is an American journalist. A longtime reporter and editor for The Boston Globe, Martin F. Nolan has covered American politics with a distinctive style that deployed allusions from Shakespeare to baseball.

His reporting was innovative. In 1971, he began a year-end tradition of recalling the year's notable obituaries, an “Auld Lang Syne” feature widely copied by other newspapers and magazines.

In 1970, he was the first reporter to use “Joe SixPack” to describe a working-class American voter.

Nolan wrote for the Globe from 1961 to 2001. While working as a White House correspondent, his name appeared on President Richard Nixon's “enemies list” in 1973.

He was a general assignment reporter, manning the Globe desk at the Boston police headquarters overnight. After covering Boston City Hall and the Massachusetts State House, Nolan was assigned to Washington. In 1969, he was named Washington bureau chief, and in 1981, he became the Globe's editorial page editor.

== Early life ==
Born in Boston on March 28, 1940, he was the fifth of five children born to Neil and Martina Nolan. After attending St. Patrick's Grammar School in Roxbury and Boston College High School, he received a B.A. in history from Boston College. He later received fellowships at Duke, Harvard and Stanford Universities.

From 1963 to 1965, Nolan was a private in the U.S. Army. He taught what the military called “applied journalism” at the Army and Defense Information Schools.

While off-duty, he reported for the Globe on a free-lance basis, interviewing Richard Nixon, Robert Kennedy, Barry Goldwater and Nelson Rockefeller.

== Journalism coverage ==
The Globe assigned him to Washington in 1965, where he worked until 1981, covering Congress, the White House, the Supreme Court and other government agencies.

He was a member of the Globe investigative team, which was awarded the 1966 Pulitzer Prize for “meritorious and disinterested public service”. The paper reported conflicting testimony from a federal judgeship nominee supported by Sen. Edward M. Kennedy. The nominee had served as an aide to the family patriarch, former Ambassador Joseph P. Kennedy.

Nolan covered presidential campaigns from 1968 to 2004. He interviewed 12 U.S. Presidents, from Harry Truman to Barack Obama, before, during or after their presidencies. Overseas, he interviewed Israeli prime minister Menachem Begin, Palestinian leader Yassir Arafat and politicians in Ireland and the United Kingdom.

== Critical praise ==
After he became the Globe's Washington bureau chief in 1969, he won approval from his peers, including John Chancellor and Walter Mears, co-authors of The News Business. On NBC, Chancellor called Nolan “one of the very best political reporters in Washington, as savvy and careful as they come”. Mears, of the Associated Press, wrote that “Nolan was a talented, insightful reporter”.

In Boys on the Bus, a 1973 book on campaign journalism, the author, Timothy Crouse, described him as the following:

"Nolan, a witty man in his middle 30s, had the unshaven, slack-jawed, nuts-to-you-too look of a bartender in a sailors’ cafe. He grew up in Dorchester, then a poor section of Boston, and asked his first tough political question at the age of 12. “Sister, how do you know Dean Acheson’s a Communist?”. He had challenged a reactionary nun in his parochial school, and the reprimand hadn't daunted him from asking wiseacre questions ever since."

— Timothy Crouse, Boys on the Bus

Nolan seldom described political leaders and their predicaments as solemnly as their staffs and campaign handlers did. In 1972, he told Globe readers about a “more precise” Massachusetts senator: "Interviewing Edward Kennedy used to be like watching an haute-cinematheque French movie. The dialogue was often reduced to soulful stares and meaningful grunts."

He compared George Meany, the AFL-CIO president, to Shakespeare's King Lear: "A cigar stub as his orb and a plumber's wrench as his scepter.... presiding over the final hours of labor's dominance in Democratic Party politics."

Reporting from Portland, Oregon after a volcano eruption, he wrote: "Church services were canceled Sunday in reluctant homage to Mount St, Helens. As citizens of these ecology-minded states swept volcanic ash off homes and cars, many of their shrines of scenery were shrouded in Biblical gray. If clergymen needed an Old Testament text, they could have chosen Genesis 18:27 in which Abraham argues with the Lord to spare cities, noting that he is still ‘but dust and ashes.’”

== Nominations and awards ==
In 1973, Nolan was elected to Washington’s Gridiron Club, devoted to an elite annual white-tie dinner “roasting” politicians. In February 1974, the club voted to continue its policy of refusing membership to women reporters. Nolan resigned, the first Gridiron member to quit since the 19th century.

He called the vote “an active policy of discrimination,” as well as “unprofessional, unfair and ungentlemanly.” Protests from female reporters and their political supporters helped change the policy. In November 1974, the Gridiron Club, founded in 1885, voted to admit women for the first time.

In Washington, Nolan continued to follow Massachusetts politics. In 1975, Globe editor Thomas Winship assigned him to help cover Boston's mayoral election. Nolan also reported on the 1978 Bay State elections.

In 1981, Globe publisher William O. Taylor named him editorial page editor. He continued to report on politics and won several awards. In 1985, he was one of three finalists for the Pulitzer Prize in commentary. In 1991, he was a finalist for the Pulitzer Prize in editorial writing.

Nolan has been a season ticket holder at Fenway Park since 1982, a longtime fan of the Boston Red Sox.

In 1986, he helped the Globe recruit writers for a special edition for the World Series. The articles were collected in the 1991 book, The Red Sox Reader. Its first sentences come from Nolan's essay on Fenway Park, often cited in exhibitions of baseball art:

Fenway Park has remained a central feature of Boston baseball throughout multiple eras, from the careers of Tris Speaker and Babe Ruth to those of Jimmie Foxx, Ted Williams, Carl Yastrzemski, and Jim Rice. Known for its distinctive and unconventional design, the ballpark differs from many modern stadiums in its layout and architectural features. Fenway Park is widely recognized as a historic landmark in New England and has played a significant role in the history and culture of baseball. It continues to serve as the home venue for baseball games and other events.

After new ownership came to Fenway in 2000, Red Sox president Larry Lucchino ordered the first sentences be printed on the wall of the team's conference room.

In 2003, in his book on the Red Sox, The Teammates, David Halberstam quoted Nolan on life as a Red Sox fan: "The Red Sox killed my father, and now they're coming after me." In 2012, the team commissioned Nolan to write a centenary essay marking Fenway Park's 100th birthday. “The Fenway Century,” printed in the ballpark's official tour book, concludes that:

For ten dynamic decades, a prosaic pile of bricks assembled in a reclaimed swamp has housed the passionate poetry of hope. The park defines the intensity of history and tradition in Boston, an old city on the edge of the continent.

— Martin Nolan, "The Fenway Century"

== Journalism career ==
In 1991, after 10 years of editing the Globe's editorial page, Nolan returned to reporting on city, state and national politics. Boston Magazine profiled a reporter "whose curiosity, skill and spirit combine to catch the essence of the town....it is hard to be iconoclastic in an age without idols, but Marty Nolan comes close."

After a fellowship at Stanford's Hoover Institution, Nolan returned to California in 1995 to become the Globe's West Coast correspondent, writing news stories and columns until 2001, when he retired. He wrote for the San Francisco Chronicle, the San Francisco Examiner, the Los Angeles Times and the California Journal.

He became a board member of the Gold Rush Trail Foundation in San Francisco, which aims to replicate Boston's Freedom Trail. The foundation sponsors tours of historic downtown sites in San Francisco for Bay Area schoolchildren.

He has contributed chapters to five books and written in The Atlantic, National Review, New Republic, New York, The New York Observer, The Reporter, Village Voice, Washingtonian, and Washington Monthly. His writings have also appeared in the Los Angeles Times, The New York Times, the Washington Post, and the Washington Star.

== Personal life ==
Nolan has three children (David, Ellen, and Peter) and two stepchildren, Sarah and Rose Weld.

His marriage to Margaret Carroll ended in divorce in 1974. In 1984, he married Elizabeth New Weld. They have six grandchildren and live in San Francisco.
