= Marion Elizabeth Rodgers =

Chilean-born scholar of Mencken

- Born: October 31, 1958 (age 67); Santiago, Chile
- Education: Goucher College
- Occupations: Writer, editor, biographer
- Writing career
- Notable works: Mencken: The American Iconoclast; Mencken and Sara: A Life in Letters

Marion Elizabeth Rodgers (born October 31, 1958) is a scholar, author, and editor recognized for her biographical work on H. L. Mencken.

== Early life ==
Rodgers was born October 31, 1958, in Santiago, Chile, the daughter of Chilean Maria Arce Fernandez and American William Livingston Rodgers (died 2021), a businessman and official of the United States Agency for International Development. She has a sister, Linda Suben, and a brother, William Rodgers. She graduated from Goucher College in 1981.

== Mencken scholarship ==
Rodgers became interested in Mencken while researching Sara Haardt, who had attended Goucher College and later married Mencken. She discovered a trove of correspondence between Mencken and Haardt which she compiled and edited for the book Mencken and Sara: A Life in Letters: The Private Correspondence of H.L. Mencken and Sara Haardt.

Certainly Mencken’s name came up during the course of my studies. But my real introduction to Mencken was shortly before my graduation from Goucher College, in 1981, while I was researching the papers of Southern writer and alumna Sara Haardt, whom Mencken had married, thereby shattering his reputation as “America’s Foremost Bachelor.” I was putting away one of her scrapbooks in the vault of the library when I literally tripped over a box of love letters between her and Mencken. Taped to the top of the collection was a stern command, written by Mencken, that it was not to be opened until that very year. To say that my life changed at that moment would be an understatement. Suddenly, a door was swung open into Mencken’s life through the tender route of romantic correspondence. In those days my dream was to go to graduate school and write (yet another!) dull thesis on T. S. Eliot. Instead, I focused my degree on the Mencken/Haardt collection, promptly received a book contract, and became hooked.

Rodgers wrote a biography, Mencken: The American Iconoclast, published in 2007. Joseph C. Goulden, founder of The Mencken Society, declared Rodgers’s book to be "the most superb and entertaining biography (in any field) that I’ve read in years.” Kirkus Reviews praised the book as “the best biography of Mencken to date.” The Blade found it to be “by far the best Mencken biography ever written...a masterpiece.” Publishers Weekly commended it as "a meticulous portrait of one of the most original and complicated men in American letters.” Boston Globe writer Martin Nolan declared the biography "the best ever on the sage of Baltimore, is exhaustive but never exhausting, and offers readers more than moderate intelligence and an awfully good time." In The Independent, Douglas Kennedy opined that "Rodgers juggles the dense narrative of Mencken's life and times with considerable dexterity, while also providing a glimpse into the very private world of a man who had many mistresses and a pathological fear of domestic entrapment. His was one of the key American literary lives of the 20th century, and Rodgers has, quite simply, done him proud."

Terry Teachout, the author of an earlier biography of Mencken, offered a mixed review of Rodgers's book. He called it "absorbing, even indispensable reading for anyone who already has a well-informed interest in H. L. Mencken." On the other hand, he wrote, "Rodgers appears to be writing about Mencken the libertarian, a devout believer in 'liberty up to the extreme limits of the feasible and tolerable,' but on closer inspection it becomes clear that she takes his political and philosophical ideas, such as they are, at something like face value, rarely stopping to probe below the surface." Charles Fecher, who edited Mencken's diary for publication, was more approving, calling Rodgers's book "the most complete and most living picture of H.L. Mencken that has ever been attempted, written with vividness and even poignancy."

For the Library of America Rodgers edited a reissue of Mencken's Prejudices series and an expanded edition of Mencken's three volumes of memoirs known as the Days books.

== Personal life ==
Rodgers married journalist Jules Witcover on June 21, 1997, in the rear garden of his historic home in Georgetown, in Washington, D.C.; the two had met at a tribute to the Baltimore Evening Sun.

== Selected works as author, editor, speaker, contributor ==
=== Books ===
- Mencken and Sara: A Life in Letters: The Private Correspondence of H.L. Mencken and Sara Haardt (McGraw-Hill Companies, 1987)
- The Impossible H.L. Mencken: A Selection of His Best Newspaper Stories, editor (Anchor, 1991)
- Mencken: The American Iconoclast (Oxford University Press, 2005)
- Notes on Democracy: A New Edition (by H. L. Mencken), introduction and annotation (Dissident Books, 2008)
- Prejudices: The Complete Series, editor and annotation (Library of America 2010)

=== Articles ===
- By His Own Rules: H. L. Mencken, a cigar always in hand, was the most influential commentator of his time (Cigar Aficionado, Summer 1994)
- H.L. Mencken: Courage in a Time of Lynching (Nieman Reports, Summer 2006)
- The Last Trials of Clarence Darrow (review, The Washington Times, August 16, 2009)
- Louisa May Alcott: The Woman Behind Little Women (review, The Washington Times, November 1, 2009)
- Anne Frank: The Book, The Life, The Afterlife (review, The Washington Times, December 6, 2009)
- Mark Twain: Man in White: The Grand Adventure of His Final Years (review, The Washington Times, April 9, 2010)
- Animal Factory: The Looming Threat of Industrial Pig, Dairy, and Poultry Farms to Humans and the Environment (review, The Washington Times, April 23, 2010)
- H.L. Mencken would skewer Hillary Clinton and Donald Trump (The Washington Times, October 10, 2016)
- The Savaging of Laura Ingalls Wilder (The American Spectator, July 6. 2018)
- Memories of Edmund Morris (The American Spectator, May 30, 2019)
- H.L. Mencken on Independence Day: 'We Have Borne Rascality Since 1776, and We Continue To Survive’ (Reason, July 3, 2019)
- The Alt-Right Loves H.L. Mencken. The Feeling Would Not Have Been Mutual. (Reason, September 12, 2018)
- H.L. Mencken on 'Numskull' Presidents, the Spanish Flu, and the Depression (Reason, March 20, 2020)

=== Speeches ===
- Mencken: The American Iconoclast (C-SPAN, 2005)
- H. L. Mencken and George S. Schuyler (Baltimore Bar Library, Mitchell Courthouse, Baltimore, MD., March 10, 2016)
- Mencken and Religion (Baltimore Bar Library, Mitchell Courthouse, Baltimore, May 9, 2018)
- H. L. Mencken: The German-American from Baltimore (The Society for the History of Germans in Maryland, date unknown)

=== Interviews ===
- Writings of H.L. Mencken (C-SPAN, 2002)
- Mencken and Making of an Ink-Stained Wretch (C-SPAN 2005)
- Marion Elizabeth Rodgers interview, 2006 (Connie Martinson Talks Books, 2006)
- The Library of America interviews Marion Elizabeth Rodgers about H. L. Mencken (2010)
- Book Interview: “Prejudices” Complete — The World According to H. L. Mencken (The Arts Fuse, October 26, 2010)
- Marion Elizabeth Rodgers on the new, expanded edition of H. L. Mencken’s autobiographical trilogy (2014)
- More Mencken (Baltimore City Paper, September 9, 2014)
