= Parachute journalism =

Aspect of journalism

Parachute journalism is the practice of sending journalists into unfamiliar areas to report on a story in which they have little prior knowledge. This approach is often used during breaking news events. It can lead to inaccurate or distorted reporting, due to the journalist's lack of familiarity with the topic, tight deadlines, and reliance on external sources. Unlike beat reporters and correspondents who may live in the area and develop expertise over time, parachute journalists are typically general assignment reporters or well-known figures sent to cover a specific event.

Critics argue that parachute journalism often results in superficial coverage that misrepresents facts and overlooks the broader context of a situation. Journalists involved in parachute reporting may lack in-depth understanding, making them vulnerable to disorientation in unfamiliar environments. They often rely on external sources, such as other media outlets or official statements, which can sometimes be biased or propagandistic.

Additionally, parachute journalists may have limited local contacts, leading them to depend on freelance stringers for information. This can strain relationships, as stringers may feel overshadowed by the arrival of a high-profile journalist, potentially affecting the quality of reporting. Furthermore, due to time constraints and lack of local knowledge, parachute journalists may forgo comprehensive background research or independent investigations, often relying on pre-departure research conducted in their home country. Another downside is the tendency of parachute journalists to engage in pack journalism, where multiple reporters adopt similar angles or narratives.

Despite these challenges, there are potential benefits to parachute journalism. As outsiders, parachute journalists may offer a fresh perspective, highlighting aspects of a story that local reporters or stringers might overlook. They may also be more adept at identifying elements of the story that would resonate with a global audience.
