= Fear and Loathing in Las Vegas (disambiguation) =

Fear and Loathing in Las Vegas is a 1971 novel by Hunter S. Thompson.

Fear and Loathing in Las Vegas may also refer to:

- Fear and Loathing on the Campaign Trail '72
- Fear and Loathing in Las Vegas (film), a 1998 film based on the novel
- Fear, and Loathing in Las Vegas, a Japanese metalcore band
