= The Proud Highway =

Book by Hunter S. Thompson

- Editor: Douglas Brinkley
- Author: Hunter S. Thompson
- Language: English
- Series: The Fear and Loathing Letters
- Publisher: Random House
- Publication date: 1997
- Publication place: United States
- ISBN: 0-375-75020-7
- Preceded by: Fear and Loathing in America
- Text: The Proud Highway online

The Fear and Loathing Letters, Vol. 1: The Proud Highway: The Saga of a Desperate Southern Gentleman, 1955–1967 is a 1997 collection of letters by Hunter S. Thompson, edited by Douglas Brinkley. Published by Villard Books, it is the first volume of Thompson's collected correspondence, spanning the years 1955 to 1967. The letters chronicle Thompson's early career as a journalist and writer, documenting his travels, military service, newspaper work in the United States and Latin America, and the development of his literary voice leading up to the publication of Hell's Angels (1966).

== Contents and reception ==
The book begins with an essay Thompson wrote while attending Louisville Male High School in Louisville, Kentucky, and follows his development as a writer through the publication of Hell's Angels in 1967, which established him as a nationally and internationally recognized author. The collection includes letters to family members, journalists, writers, political figures, and other public figures, including Charles Kuralt, Phil Graham, Norman Mailer, Tom Wolfe, Carey McWilliams, Lyndon B. Johnson, and Joan Baez. The correspondence documents Thompson's development as a writer and provides observations on American society and culture during the administrations of Dwight D. Eisenhower and John F. Kennedy and the social and cultural changes of the 1960s.

The forward of the book, written by William Kennedy, reads:

Hunter identified with literary outsiders: Salinger's Holden Caulfield, Donleavy's Ginger Man. He learned from Mencken how to be an attack dog, but he cheered for Algren and Fitzgerald and West.

—

Steven Moore, writing for The Washington Post, praised The Proud Highway as Thompson's "best book in years" and highlighted the energy and exuberance evident in his early letters.
