= The Rum Diary (film) =

2011 film by Bruce Robinson

- Theatrical release poster
- Directed by: Bruce Robinson
- Screenplay by: Bruce Robinson
- Based on: The Rum Diary by Hunter S. Thompson
- Produced by: Johnny Depp; Graham King; Christi Dembrowski; Anthony Rhulen; Robert Kravis; Tim Headington; Greg Shapiro
- Starring: Johnny Depp; Aaron Eckhart; Michael Rispoli; Amber Heard; Richard Jenkins; Giovanni Ribisi
- Cinematography: Dariusz Wolski
- Edited by: Carol Littleton
- Music by: Christopher Young
- Production companies: GK Films; Infinitum Nihil; FilmEngine
- Distributed by: FilmDistrict
- Release dates: October 13, 2011 (Los Angeles); October 28, 2011 (United States)
- Running time: 120 minutes
- Country: United States
- Language: English
- Budget: $45 million
- Box office: $30.1 million

The Rum Diary is a 2011 American comedy-drama film written and directed by Bruce Robinson, based on the novel of the same name by Hunter S. Thompson, published 1998. The film stars Johnny Depp, Aaron Eckhart, Michael Rispoli, Amber Heard, Richard Jenkins, and Giovanni Ribisi.

Filming began in Puerto Rico in March 2009 and was released by FilmDistrict on October 28, 2011. The film received mixed reviews and grossed just $30.1 million against its $45 million budget.

== Plot ==
Paul Kemp is an author who has not been able to sell a book. He gets a job at a newspaper in San Juan, Puerto Rico. There, he meets staff photographer Sala, who gets him acclimated and tells him he thinks the newspaper will fold soon. Kemp checks into a hotel, and while idling about on a boat in the sea, meets Chenault, who is skinny-dipping while avoiding a Union Carbide party. Kemp is immediately smitten with her.

Kemp and Sala immediately go on a drinking binge, which earns Kemp the enmity of his editor, E. J. Lotterman. Kemp also meets Moburg, a deadbeat reporter who cannot be fired. While waiting for an interview, Kemp meets Hal Sanderson, a PR consultant flaunting a luxurious lifestyle, who offers him a side job writing public relations material for his latest venture. Sanderson is engaged to Chenault, who pretends not to know Kemp.

Later, Kemp moves in with Sala, who also rooms with Moburg. Kemp begins to see the poverty of San Juan, but Lotterman does not want him to write about it, as it would be bad for tourism. Moburg returns with leftover filters from a rum plant; they contain high-proof alcohol. Moburg has been fired, and rants about killing Lotterman.

Kemp visits Sanderson and spies on him having sex with Chenault in the sea. He meets Zimburger and Segurra, who are working with Sanderson on his venture. Later, an inebriated Sala berates a restaurant owner for refusing them service; Kemp senses the owner's hostility, so Sala and he make a hasty retreat, pursued by angry locals. The police arrive, break up the fight, and then throw Sala and Kemp in jail. Sanderson bails them out.

The next day, Kemp meets with Sanderson's partners, who introduce him to the venture. The plan is to build a resort on a "pristine" island off the coast of Puerto Rico. Later Kemp is asked to pick up Chenault from her house. They share a moment, but Kemp resists temptation.

Zimburger takes Kemp and Sala to see the island, part of which is still used as an artillery range by the US military. Then they head to St. Thomas for Carnival. Kemp finds Chenault, and they wind up on Sanderson's boat. Sanderson berates Kemp for involving Sala in the deal. At night, they go to a club, and a drunk Chenault dances with local men to provoke Sanderson, with whom she has been fighting. When Sanderson tries to intervene, he is forcefully removed from the dance floor by locals and led out of the club by Kemp and Sala for his own safety. Chenault stays behind at the club.

The next day, Chenault is gone, and Sanderson tells Kemp that their business arrangement is over. When Sala and Kemp return home, Moburg tells them that Lotterman has left and that the paper will go out of business. He also sells them hallucinogens, which they take. Kemp has an epiphany while under the influence, and resolves to write an exposé on Sanderson's shady deals.

Lotterman returns, but will not publish Kemp's story. Chenault shows up at Kemp's place after Sanderson disowns her. Out of spite, Sanderson withdraws his bail, indicating that Kemp and Sala are now wanted by the police. Moburg also tells them that Lotterman has closed the paper. Kemp decides to print a last issue, telling the truth about Lotterman and Sanderson as well as the stories Lotterman declined.

To make money to print the last edition, Kemp, Sala, and Moburg place a big cockfighting bet. They visit Papa Nebo, Moburg's intersex witch doctor, to lay a blessing on Sala's prize cockerel. They win but return to the office to find that the printing presses have been confiscated.

Kemp continues his quest, leaving Puerto Rico on a sailboat. The end credits explain that Kemp makes it back to New York, marries Chenault, and becomes a successful journalist, finally finding his voice as a writer.

== Cast ==
- Johnny Depp as Paul Kemp
- Aaron Eckhart as Hal Sanderson
- Michael Rispoli as Bob Sala
- Amber Heard as Chenault Holdsworth
- Richard Jenkins as Edward J. Lotterman
- Giovanni Ribisi as Moburg
- Amaury Nolasco as Segurra
- Marshall Bell as Donovan
- Bill Smitrovich as Art Zimburger
- Julian Holloway as Wolsey
- Karen Austin as Mrs. Zimburger
- Jason Smith as Davey
- Karimah Westbrook as Papa Nebo

== Production ==
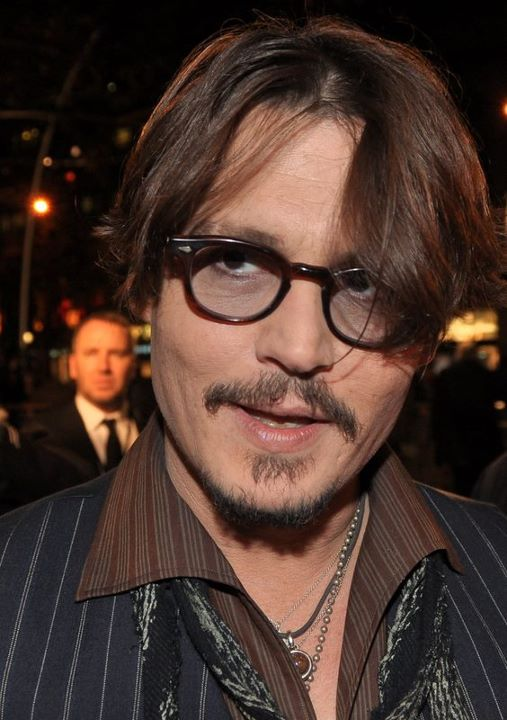
Johnny Depp in November 2011, at a premiere of the film in Paris

Hunter S. Thompson wrote the novel The Rum Diary in 1961, but it was not published until 1998. The independent production companies Shooting Gallery and SPi Films sought to adapt the novel into a film in 2000, and Johnny Depp was signed to star and to serve as executive producer. Nick Nolte was also signed to star alongside Depp. The project did not move past the development stage. During this stage, the author became so frustrated as to fire off an obscenity-laden letter calling the process a "waterhead fuckaround".

In 2002, a new producer sought the project, and Benicio del Toro and Josh Hartnett were signed to star in the film adaptation. The second incarnation also did not move past the development stage. In 2007, producer Graham King acquired all rights to the novel and sought to film the adaptation under Warner Independent Pictures. Depp, who previously starred in the 1998 film adaptation of Thompson's novel Fear and Loathing in Las Vegas with del Toro, was cast as the freelance journalist Paul Kemp.

Several actresses including Scarlett Johansson and Keira Knightley reportedly expressed interest in the role of Chenault, however some "had reservations regarding the nudity the role calls for". Actress Amber Heard was cast in the role. Bruce Robinson joined to write the screenplay and to direct The Rum Diary. In 2009, Depp's production company Infinitum Nihil took on the project with the financial backing of King and his production company GK Films. Principal photography began in Puerto Rico on March 25, 2009. Composer Christopher Young signed on to compose the film's soundtrack. Robinson had been sober for six-and-a-half years before he started writing the screenplay for The Rum Diary. The filmmaker found himself suffering from writer's block. He started drinking a bottle of wine a day until he finished the script and then he quit drinking again.

About playing the character of Kemp, Depp compared and related it to his previous role in Fear and Loathing in Las Vegas. He said "The way I approached it was that the character of Paul Kemp is Raoul Duke as he was learning to speak. It was like playing the same character, only 15 years before. This guy's got something; there's an energy burning underneath it, it's just ready to pop up, shoot out."

== Reception ==
On review aggregator Rotten Tomatoes, the film has an approval rating of 52% based on 166 reviews, with a rating average of 5.7/10. The website's critical consensus reads, "It's colorful and amiable enough, and Depp's heart is clearly in the right place, but The Rum Diary fails to add sufficient focus to its rambling source material." Metacritic, which assigns a weighted average score to reviews, gives the film a score of 56 out of 100, based on 37 critics, indicating "mixed or average reviews". Audiences polled by CinemaScore gave the film a "C" on an A+ to F scale.

Wyatt Williams, writing for Creative Loafing, argues that "the movie version amounts to Thompson's whole vision of journalism, glossed and made plain by Hollywood."

== See also ==
- List of films set in Puerto Rico
