= Jules Witcover =

American journalist (1927–2025)

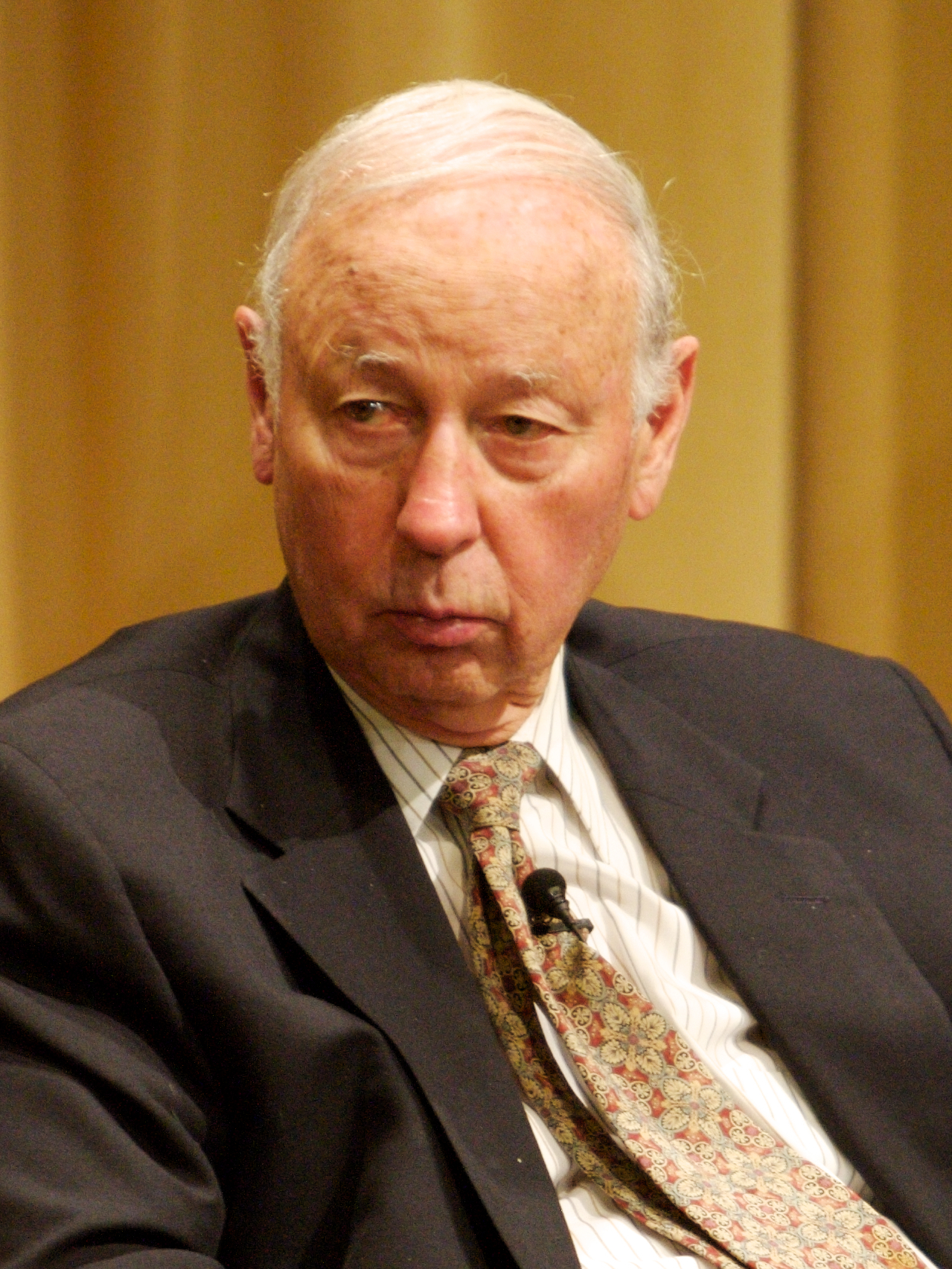
- Witcover in 2008
- Born: Jules Joseph Witcover; July 16, 1927; Union City, New Jersey, U.S.
- Died: August 16, 2025 (aged 98); Washington, D.C., U.S.
- Education: Columbia University
- Occupation: Journalist; author
- Years active: 1954–2022
- Spouse: Marion Elizabeth Rodgers (m. 1997)

Jules Joseph Witcover (July 16, 1927 – August 16, 2025) was an American journalist, author and political columnist. With a career lasting 50 years, Witcover wrote for The Baltimore Sun, the now-defunct Washington Star, the Los Angeles Times, and The Washington Post. Together with Jack Germond, Witcover co-wrote "Politics Today," a five-day-a-week syndicated column, for over 24 years.

== Early life ==
Witcover was born in Union City, New Jersey, on July 16, 1927. He graduated from Columbia College in 1949 and later from Columbia University Graduate School of Journalism in 1951.

== Career ==
Witcover began working in Washington for Newhouse Newspapers in 1954. He was reportedly steps away from where Robert F. Kennedy was shot in 1968. He was also one of the reporters featured in the 1972 book on campaign journalism, The Boys on the Bus, and eventually came to be seen as a "journalistic institution," according to media critic Howard Kurtz.

For 45 years, Witcover wrote a syndicated political column, from which he retired in 2022. His most recent book is The American Vice Presidency: From Irrelevance to Power. Published in 2014, Kirkus Reviews described the work as a "valuable book of American history." Other work includes Very Strange Bedfellows: The Short and Unhappy Marriage of Nixon & Agnew, Public Affairs (2007), and Joe Biden: A Life of Trial and Redemption. In March 2008, his history of campaign finance reform, "The Longest Campaign," appeared on the Center for Public Integrity's The Buying of the President 2008 website. Joe Biden: A Life Of Trial And Redemptions 2020 update includes 4 additional chapters, picking up where the original version left off and covers Biden's successful presidential campaign.

== Personal life and death ==
Witcover married author and H.L. Mencken scholar Marion Elizabeth Rodgers on June 21, 1997. Witcover died from cardiovascular disease at his home in Washington, D.C., on August 16, 2025, at the age of 98.

== Books written with Germond ==
External videos
- Booknotes interview with Witcover and Germond on Whose Broad Stripes and Bright Stars?, August 27, 1989, C-SPAN

- Blue Smoke & Mirrors: How Reagan Won and Why Carter Lost the Election of 1980, Viking Press (1981)
- Wake Us When It's Over: Presidential Politics of 1984, Macmillan (1985)
- Whose Broad Stripes and Bright Stars? The Trivial Pursuit of the Presidency 1988, Warner Books (1989)
- Mad As Hell: Revolt at the Ballot Box 1992, Warner Books (1992)

== Books written solo ==
External videos
- Washington Journal interview with Witcover on The Year the Dream Died, August 7, 1997, C-SPAN
- Presentation by Witcover on No Way to Pick a President, December 7, 1999, C-SPAN
- Presentation by Witcover on Party of the People, November 25, 2003, C-SPAN
- Presentation by Witcover on Very Strange Bedfellows, June 8, 2007, C-SPAN
- Presentation by Witcover on Joe Biden: A Life of Trial and Redemption, December 14, 2010, C-SPAN

- The American Vice Presidency: From Irrelevance to Power, Smithsonian Books (2014)
- Joe Biden: A Life of Trial and Redemption, William Morrow & Company (2010, paperback 2019, updated 2020)
- Very Strange Bedfellows: The Short and Unhappy Marriage of Nixon & Agnew, Public Affairs (2007)
- The Making of an Ink-Stained Wretch: Half a Century Pounding the Political Beat, Johns Hopkins Press (2005)
- Party of the People: A History of the Democrats, Random House (2003)
- No Way to Pick a President: How Money and Hired Guns Have Debased American Elections, Farrar, Straus and Giroux (1999)
- The Year the Dream Died: Revisiting 1968 in America, Warner Books (1997)
- Crapshoot: Rolling the Dice on the Vice Presidency, Crown Publishers (1992)
- The Main Chance: A Novel, Viking Press (1979)
- Marathon: The Pursuit of the Presidency 1972–1976, Viking Press (1977)
- White Knight: The Rise of Spiro Agnew, Random House (1972)
- The Resurrection of Richard Nixon, Putnam (1970)
- 85 Days: The Last Campaign of Robert Kennedy, Putnam (1969) (A 20th-anniversary edition was printed by Quill in 1988 with a new introduction by Sen. Edward M. Kennedy and epilogue by the author)
