= R. W. Apple Jr. =

American journalist

- Born: Raymond Walter Apple Jr. November 20, 1934; Akron, Ohio, U.S.
- Died: October 4, 2006 (aged 71); Washington, D.C., U.S.
- Education: Columbia University School of General Studies
- Occupation: Journalist

Raymond Walter Apple Jr. (November 20, 1934 – October 4, 2006), known as Johnny Apple but bylined as R.W. Apple Jr., was a correspondent and associate editor at The New York Times, where he wrote on politics, travel, food, and other topics.

== Early life and education ==
Apple was born in Akron, Ohio. He attended and graduated from Western Reserve Academy, a private, coeducational boarding school in the small suburban town of Hudson, where he first practiced journalism at the school's newspaper, "The Reserve Record." Apple first attended Princeton University, where he was twice expelled for devoting too much time to working as chairman of The Daily Princetonian instead of attending classes. He later received a B.A. in history (magna cum laude) from the Columbia University School of General Studies in 1961.

== Career ==
He began his career with The Wall Street Journal in the 1950s, covering business and social issues, including the early years of the Civil Rights Movement. He served as a journalist and speechwriter in the United States Army from 1957 to 1959, and returned to The Wall Street Journal after completing his service. In 1961, he went to work at NBC News, becoming lifelong friends with Tom Brokaw. While at NBC, Apple reported for The Huntley-Brinkley Report and won an Emmy Award for his work. In the last of his 29 appearances on the Charlie Rose talk show, he said that the most satisfying time of his career was when he was reporting on the American civil rights movement.

In 1963, Apple joined The New York Times, where he worked for over 30 years, contributing foreign correspondence from over 100 countries, including coverage of the Vietnam War – where his penetrating questioning helped expose the unreliability of the military briefings known as the Five O'Clock Follies – the Biafra crisis, the Iranian revolution, and the fall of Communist governments in the Soviet bloc. In addition, he served as the Times' bureau chief in Saigon, Lagos, Nairobi, London and Moscow.

In Vietnam, Apple distinguished himself as chief of The New York Times bureau and won many awards for his work. In a long article in 1967, "The Making of a Stalemate," he exposed the failure of the U.S. military to make progress in the war after 2 1/2 years of fighting and with some 500,000 troops in the country. Nearly 40 years later, it was revealed that one of the main sources for that influential story was Lt. Gen. Frederick Weyand, commander of U.S. forces in III Corps, the area around Saigon.

Apple covered combat stories in the field in Vietnam. In 1966, he was nearly killed by friendly fire while covering a firefight at a village when a machine-gun bullet ripped through the back of his trousers and split his belt in half.

Timothy Crouse profiled Apple in his book The Boys on the Bus about journalists covering the 1972 presidential campaign. Reporters "recognized many of their own traits in him, grotesquely magnified. The shock of recognition frightened them. Apple was like them, only more blatant. He openly displayed the faults they tried to hide: the insecurity, the ambitiousness, the name-dropping" and "the weakness for powerful men."

From 1993 to 1997, he was chief of the Washington, D.C. bureau. He also served as the newspaper's National Political Correspondent in the 1970s and covered the 1972 presidential election.

Beyond The New York Times and The Wall Street Journal, Apple was published in many prominent magazines, including The Atlantic, Esquire, GQ, and Gourmet.

=== Personal life ===
His first marriage was to Edith Smith, a former vice-consul in Saigon. He married Betsey Pinckney Brown in 1982. They maintained residences at 1509 28th Street, Northwest, Washington, D.C. in the Georgetown neighborhood; on a farm near Gettysburg, Pennsylvania; and in the Cotswold region of England.

Apple was widely known as an expert on food and wine, and lectured on those as well as political, social, and historical topics on several continents. According to his New York Times colleague Adam Nagourney, "Johnny was the person to call for a restaurant recommendation when heading anywhere around the globe. To his eternal credit, he never kept secrets; he wrote about the places he discovered and loved. I soon learned a trick to find his recommendations without pestering him: I would search Nexis using three elements: his byline, the name of a city and the phrase "my wife, Betsey." For his 70th birthday, Apple threw a party at his favorite Paris bistro Chez l'Ami Louis that Calvin Trillin wrote about in Gourmet Magazine: 'It's my understanding that Apple has simplified what could be a terribly difficult choice by telling them to bring everything."

On October 4, 2006, Apple died from complications of thoracic cancer. His last article published for The New York Times while he was still alive was an article on Singapore cuisine that was published on September 30, 2006. The last New York Times article he wrote, entitled "The Global Gourmet," was published posthumously on October 5, 2006. The article was meant to be published in the Times' travel section several weeks later but was brought forward due to his unexpected death.

== Honors and awards ==
Apple was the recipient of a number of honors and fellowships, including the Chubb Fellowship at Yale University.

He was the chair of the Rhodes Scholarship selection committee for the U.S. mid-Atlantic region.

He received honorary degrees from several institutions, including Denison University, Knox College, Gettysburg College, Marquette University, and the University of the South.

== Bibliography ==
- Apple's Europe: An Uncommon Guide. Atheneum Press. 1987. ISBN 978-0689707216.
- Apple's America: The Discriminating Traveler's Guide to 40 Great Cities in the United States and Canada. North Point Press. 2005. ISBN 978-0865476851.
- Far Flung and Well Fed: The Food Writing of R.W. Apple Jr. St. Martin's Press. 2009. ISBN 978-0312325770.
