= The Joke's Over =

2006 book written and illustrated by Ralph Steadman

- Author: Ralph Steadman
- Illustrator: Steadman
- Cover artist: Steadman
- Publisher: William Heinemann
- Publication date: 2006
- Publication place: United Kingdom
- Media type: Print (hardcover)
- Pages: xviii, 396, 32 plates
- ISBN: 9780434016068
- OCLC: 70173319
- LC Class: NC1479.S79 A2 2006b (first), NC1479.S79 A2 2006

The Joke's Over: Bruised Memories—Gonzo, Hunter S. Thompson, and Me is a book written and illustrated by Ralph Steadman chronicling the odd and very often dangerous times when he met and worked with his friend Hunter S. Thompson. It contains some illustrations by Steadman created at the time of the events and some photos taken by Steadman or Thompson. It was published in 2006 by Heinemann in the UK and, perhaps during the same year, by Harcourt in the US.

The book tells stories of what happened when Hunter and Steadman were working together, from their first joint work at the Kentucky Derby to Fear and Loathing in Las Vegas, published as a book in 1972.
