= Prince Jellyfish =

Unpublished novel by Hunter S. Thompson

Prince Jellyfish is an unpublished novel by American journalist and author Hunter S. Thompson.

The novel was Thompson's first, written around 1960 while he was in his early 20s and was working as a reporter for the Middletown Daily Record in New York State. Thompson had moved to Middletown from New York City, where he worked briefly as a copy boy for Time.

Little is known about the book, although in Thompson's obituary, The Guardian described it as "an autobiographical novel about a boy from Louisville, going to the big city and struggling against the dunces to make his way." A short excerpt was published in Thompson's Songs of the Doomed.

The book was rejected by a number of literary agents before Thompson moved briefly to Puerto Rico and then moved on to writing his next novel, The Rum Diary. The Rum Diary, too, remained unpublished until 1998, long after Thompson had become famous.

== See also ==
- Fire in the Nuts
