= Walter Mears =

American journalist (1935–2022)

- Born: January 11, 1935; Lynn, Massachusetts, U.S.
- Died: March 3, 2022 (aged 87); Chapel Hill, North Carolina, U.S.
- Education: Middlebury College
- Occupation: Journalist
- Years active: 1956–2001
- Employer: Associated Press
- Spouses: Sally Danton (died 1962); Joyce Lund (divorced); Carroll Ann Rambo (m. 1986, divorced); Frances Richardson (m. 1997; died 2019)
- Children: 4

Walter Robert Mears (January 11, 1935 – March 3, 2022) was an American journalist, author, and educator. Mears worked for the Associated Press (AP) from 1956 until his retirement in 2001. In 1977, he won the Pulitzer Prize for National Reporting for his coverage of the 1976 United States presidential election. After retirement, he taught journalism at the University of North Carolina at Chapel Hill and at Duke University.

== Early life and education ==
Mears was born in Lynn, Massachusetts, on January 11, 1935, and raised in Lexington. He graduated in 1956 from Middlebury College, where he was editor-in-chief of the school newspaper, the Campus, later referring to his four years of work with the paper as his "journalism school".

== Career ==
Mears began working as a newsman with the AP immediately after graduation in 1956, initially covering Vermont state politics from the Montpelier office and moving to national politics in 1960. He became chief of the Washington bureau, in the 1980s was executive editor in the New York bureau, and retired in 2001 as vice president of the Washington bureau, where he wrote a widely syndicated Washington Today column. In the 1970s, he was one of the subjects of Timothy Crouse's book The Boys on the Bus about reporters covering the 1972 presidential election between Richard Nixon and George McGovern. and was such a well known reporter that he was featured in Doonesbury comics; one Trudeau comic strip, published on February 5, 1973, depicted Mears questioning Richard Nixon's so-called "Energy Czar", John A. Love, during the embargo and oil crisis. He won the 1977 Pulitzer Prize for National Reporting for his coverage of the 1976 Presidential campaign and election.

After retirement, Mears occasionally published articles on his AP blog, and taught journalism at the University of North Carolina at Chapel Hill and at Duke University, where he also became a volunteer instructor at the Osher Lifelong Learning Institute in 2016.

External videos
- Booknotes interview with Mears on Deadlines Past, January 11, 2004, C-SPAN
- Presentation by Mears on Deadlines Past, March 27, 2004, C-SPAN

With colleague John Chancellor, Mears co-wrote two books on journalism, The News Business (1983) and The New News Business: A Guide to Writing and Reporting (1995). In 2003, he published Deadlines Past: Forty Years of Presidential Campaigning: A Reporter's Story, a book about his experiences covering 11 presidential campaigns over his career. He also worked for two years with reporters of the Associated Press in writing Breaking News: How the Associated Press Has Covered War, Peace and Everything Else, published in 2004.

== Honors ==
In addition to the Pulitzer Prize for National Reporting, Mears won several awards over the course of his career. From the AP, he won the Managing Editors Association's Top Performance Award in 1973, and the Robert R. Eunson Distinguished Journalist Award in 1986. The AP also awarded him a membership to the Burning Tree Club following his Pulizer Prize win. Middlebury College awarded him an honorary Doctor of Letters in 1977 and the Alumni Award in 2011; he served on the Board of Trustees from 1980 to 1984.

== Political and philosophical views ==
Mears believed the newspaper business had a duty to report facts and maintain a neutral point of view; he believed that personal opinions had no place in good journalism. Even after retiring, he continued to encourage transparent campaign coverage and spoke about the need for good background and fact checking, especially in the digital age of reporting. He believed that "print news is the best place to look for information."

In 2004, two questions were directed to Mears during the first session of a bloggers conference sponsored by the Berkman Klein Center for Internet & Society. The questioner, David Weinberger, wanted to know whom Mears supported for president; Mears refused to say, asking "How could you trust what I write?" In response, Mears was asked how could he be trusted in what he writes about on his blog. Mears responded to the second question in his AP blog by speaking to the importance of transparency and ethics in campaign reporting. He decried the lack of content and accuracy in much of today's reporting. He wrote about the need to "get the facts straight," and, while he acknowledged the difference and difficulties in reporting between his days and now, he implicitly responded to the question asked by Weinberger by explaining how to earn trust. Mears' point in the blog was emphasized by Bill Mitchell and Bob Steel in a report for the Poynter Institute after the conference.

During his years of reporting and after, Mears was critical of all candidates, no matter their political affiliation. Earlier in 2004, speaking at Montgomery College's Lycem series, he called the political conventions "all show and no decision." During a question-and-answer session, he said the word media "had become convoluted in the context of 24-hour cable news and the 'echo chamber' it [had] created."

In a 2016 interview for Duke Today, when questioned about "getting the journalism that our democracy needs," Mears responded:

"You can always make it better. But I think the information that the AP and other solid outlets are delivering is there, it's available. The problem is that you can write the best story in the world and if no one reads it, what difference does it make? And as I say, the attention spans have decreased to fit the size of the tweet. And it takes time to read an 800-word explanation of where a candidate stands on a particularly difficult issue. I think too many of us don't take the time to find out the facts and accept as the truth something that someone tells them. They accept opinion as truth".

In the same interview, he was questioned about the presidential election campaign. Mears remained analytical in his responses. When asked about Trump speeches and if they reminded of him of an earlier era, Mears compared him to populist senator Huey Long, saying "If you want to go back to another time when someone matched Trump in simple answers – 'I'll fix this for you' – you have to go all the way back to Huey Long. The Roosevelt people were concerned about Long running for president back in 1936. He was assassinated before he got there, but he had much of the same approach that Trump does. You know, don't ask a lot of questions. I'll make every man a king. And that's Donald Trump."

In 2019, Mears described his views on the impeachment hearings of Donald Trump in the context of previous hearings of Richard Nixon and Bill Clinton.

== Personal life ==
Mears was married four times. His first wife, Sally Danton, and their two children died in a house fire on December 24, 1962. He and his second wife, Joyce Lund Mears, a former reporter, had two daughters; the couple later divorced. He and Carroll Ann Rambo Mears, a producer for NBC News, married in 1986; that marriage also ended in divorce. He met AP journalist Frances Richardson in 1994, and they married in 1997. Following Mears' retirement in 2001, the couple moved to Arlington County, Virginia. After his book Deadlines Past was published, they left the Washington area in 2005 and moved to Chapel Hill, North Carolina, where they lived in Governors Club, a private community. Frances Mears died in 2019.

Mears died from cancer at his home in Chapel Hill on March 3, 2022, at the age of 87.
