= Chez l'Ami Louis =

Restaurant in Paris, France

Coordinates: 48.8670°N 2.3582°E

- Founded: 1924; 101 years ago
- Founder: Antoine Magnin
- Headquarters: Paris, France
- Owner: LVMH Group; (2024–present)

Chez l'Ami Louis (French pronunciation: [ʃe lami lwi], Our friend Louis's) is a restaurant at 32, rue du Vertbois, in the 3rd arrondissement of Paris, France, founded in 1924.

The restaurant, which has been called "the world's most famous bistro" and "the worst restaurant in the world", has only fourteen tables and serves meals in a traditional French setting. It was founded by the chef Antoine Magnin, who died in 1987. Gault Millau said of him that he had "an eagle eye for choosing produce" and that the meat and poultry he served was the best in Paris. The current host is Louis Gadby.

L'Ami Louis specializes in traditional bistro-style French cuisine, including roast chicken, thickly sliced foie gras, and roast lamb. Notable clients have included Francis Ford Coppola and Alice Waters, who has named it as her favourite restaurant. L'Ami Louis has been visited by Bill Clinton and Jacques Chirac, was the venue for the 60th birthday party of writer Anthony Dias Blue, as well as the 70th birthday party of R. W. Apple, Jr. On 12 November 2021, U.S. Vice President Kamala Harris dined there with Second Gentleman Douglas Emhoff.

After being acquired in June 2024 by LVMH Group, the century-old Parisian restaurant became part of the LVMH Hospitality Excellence division.
