= Watchung Avenue station =

NJ Transit rail station

Watchung Ave.
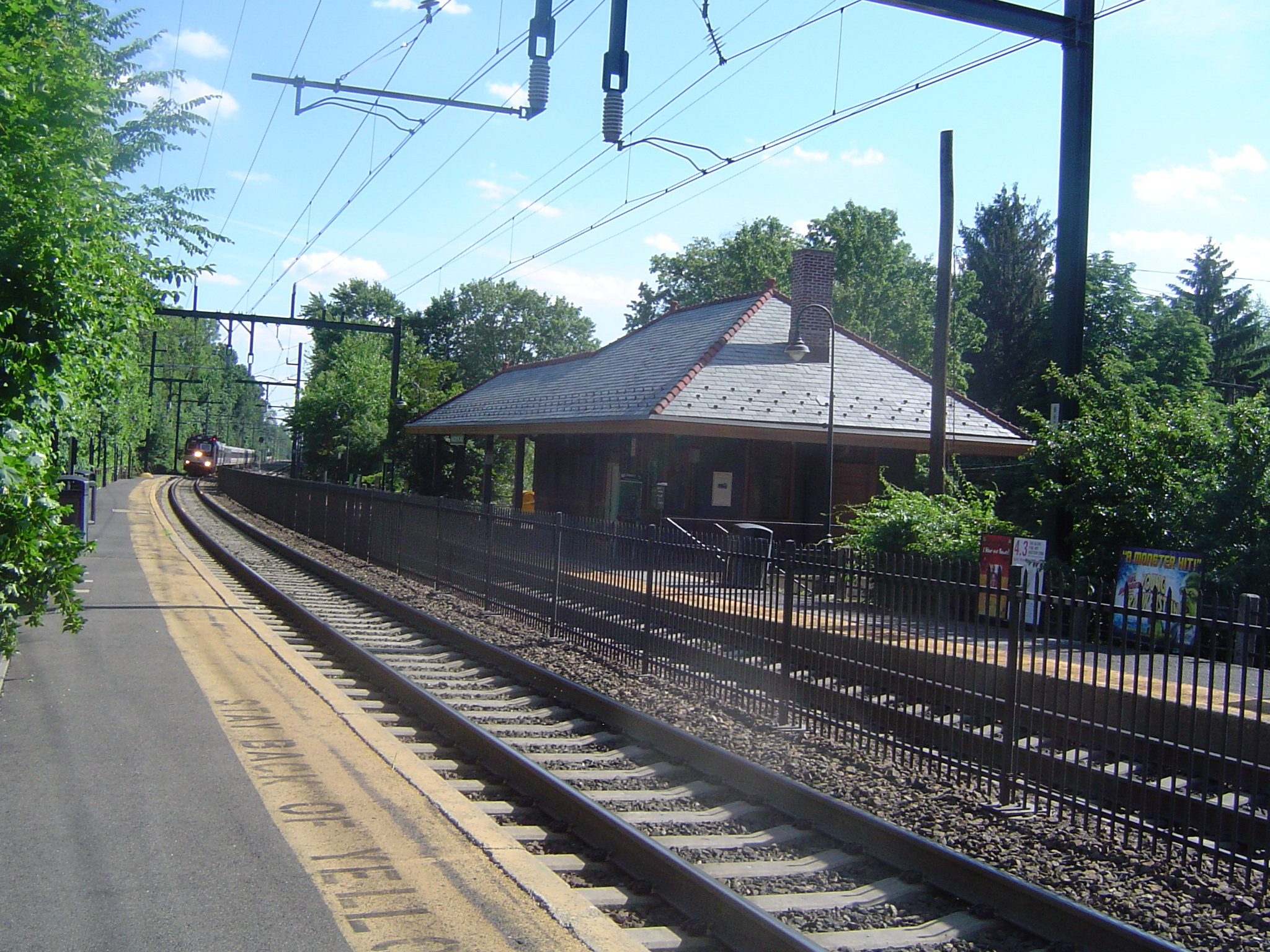
- Watchung Avenue station as a train enters the station

General information
- Location: 396 Park Street; Montclair, New Jersey 07042
- Owner: New Jersey Transit
- Platforms: 2 low-level side platforms
- Tracks: 2
- Connections: NJT Bus: 28, 101

Construction
- Parking: 95 permit spots
- Cycle facilities: No bicycle racks

Other information
- Station code: 1739 (Erie Railroad)
- Fare zone: 5

History
- Opened: January 1, 1873
- Rebuilt: March 19, 1901–1904
- Electrified: September 30, 2002
- Former names: Park Street (January 1, 1873–March 31, 1919)

Passengers
- 2025: 610 (average weekday)
- Rank: 48 of 153

Services
Preceding station	NJ Transit	Following station
Upper Montclair toward Hackettstown	Montclair–Boonton Line weekdays	Walnut Street toward New York or Hoboken
Former services
Preceding station	Erie Railroad	Following station
Upper Montclair toward Sterling Forest	New York and Greenwood Lake Railway	Montclair toward Jersey City
- Watchung Avenue Station
- U.S. National Register of Historic Places
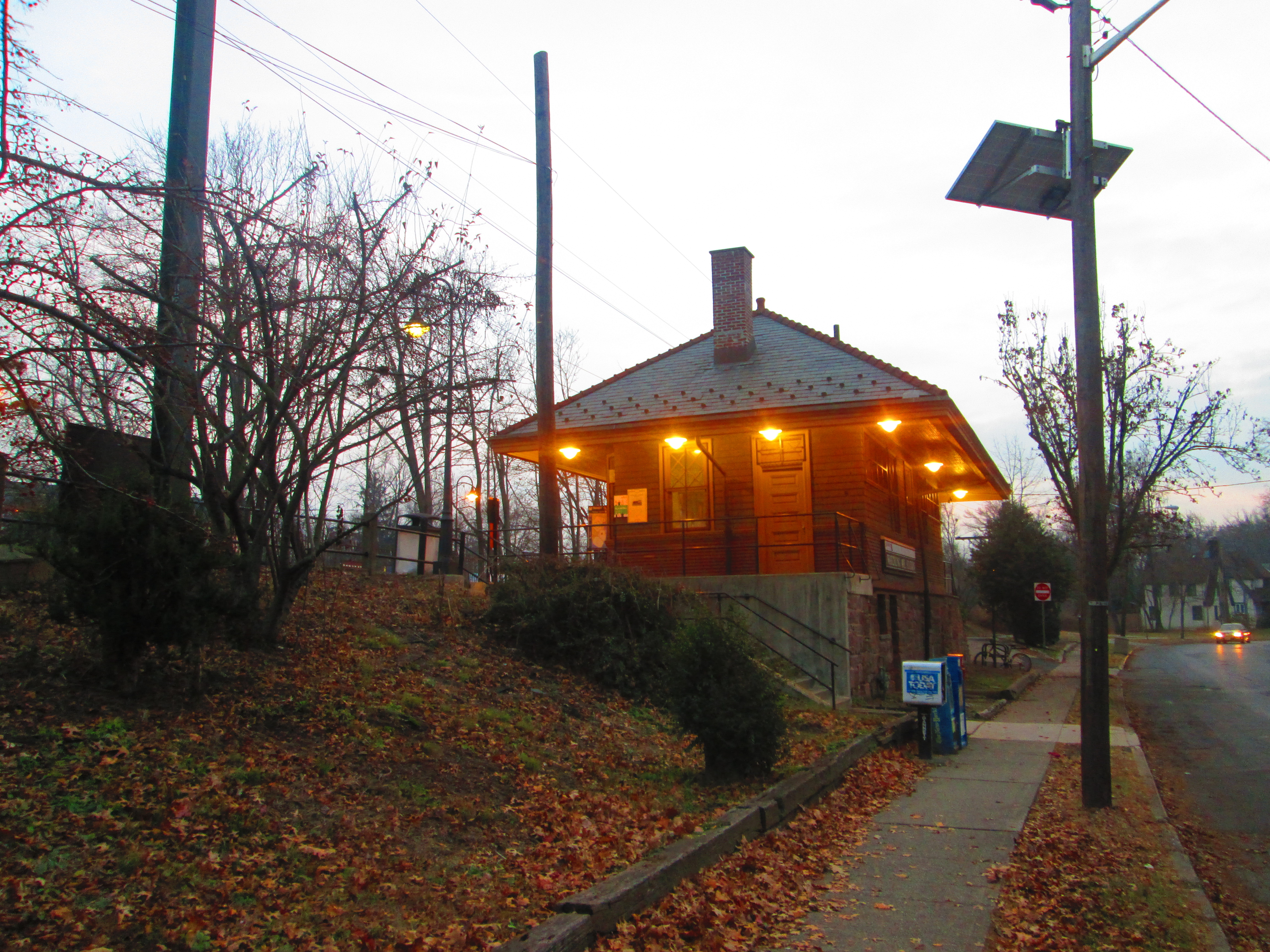
- The Watchung Avenue station depot in December 2014.
- Location: Montclair, New Jersey, USA
- Coordinates: 40°49′46.56″N 74°12′25.38″W
- Area: 1.5 acres (0.61 ha)
- Built: 1873
- Architectural style: Renaissance
- MPS: Operating Passenger Railroad Stations TR
- NRHP reference No.: 84002674
- Added to NRHP: June 22, 1984
Location

Watchung Avenue is an active commuter railroad station in the township of Montclair, Essex County, New Jersey. Located at Park Street (inbound) and Watchung Plaza (outbound), the station serves trains of NJ Transit's Montclair–Boonton Line from New York Penn Station to Hackettstown station in Warren County on weekdays. Regular weekend service in Montclair terminates at Bay Street, two stations south. The only station not at street-level in Montclair, Watchung Avenue station is located on an elevated embankment at the end of a bridge over the namesake Watchung Avenue. The station consists of two low-level side platforms, running from the overpass to the Watchung School. The wooden station depot stands on the embankment next to the inbound platform.

Watchung Avenue station opened on January 1, 1873 under the name of Park Street as part of the Montclair Railway, which operated between Jersey City and Sterling Forest. The railroad built the current station in 1904 and changed the name to Watchung Avenue on March 31, 1919. The station depot was placed on the National Register of Historic Places on June 22, 1984, one of three stations added via the Operating Passenger Railroad Stations Thematic Resource. Until the opening of the Montclair Connection on September 30, 2002, all train service operated on the Boonton Line from Hoboken Terminal. That day, the station became part of a merged Montclair–Boonton Line.

== Station layout ==
The station's low-level side platforms are not wheelchair accessible.

== Bibliography ==
- Baxter, Raymond J.; Adams, Arthur G. (1999). Railroad Ferries of the Hudson: And Stories of a Deckhand. Fordham, New York: Fordham University Press. ISBN 9780823219544.
- Catlin, George L. (1873). Homes on the Montclair Railway, for New York Business Men. A Description of the Country Adjacent to the Montclair Railway, Between Jersey City and Greenwood Lake. New York, New York: Montclair Railway Company.
- Whittemore, Henry (1894). History of Montclair Township, State of New Jersey: Including the History of Families who Have Been Identified with Its Growth and Prosperity. New York, New York: The Suburban Publishing Company.
