= The Curse of Lono =

1983 book by Hunter S. Thompson

- Author: Hunter S. Thompson
- Illustrator: Ralph Steadman
- Language: English
- Genre: Memoir
- Publisher: Bantam Books
- Publication date: 1983
- Publication place: United States
- Media type: Print
- Pages: 208

The Curse of Lono is a book by Hunter S. Thompson describing his experiences in Hawaii in 1980. Originally published in 1983, the book was only in print for a short while. In 2005 it was re-released as a limited edition of 1,000 copies, each being signed by the author and artist Ralph Steadman. The book is now available as a smaller hardcover edition.

== Plot ==
Hunter S. Thompson receives a letter from the editor of Running magazine, asking him to cover the 1980 Honolulu Marathon, which the editor says should be "a good chance for a vacation". Thompson asks the illustrator Ralph Steadman to accompany him. On the flight over, he meets a man named Ackerman, who seems to have connections to the drug trade in Hawaii. Thompson covers the marathon with his characteristic gonzo style, weaving his own experiences into the coverage of the story. After the marathon, Thompson along with Steadman and his family move to a rented beach side compound on Hawaii's Kona coast. The weather is miserable and they are trapped indoors, besieged by huge waves. Steadman and his family, upset about the terrible conditions of their vacation, return to England. Later, Thompson reunites with Ackerman to go fishing. Thompson eventually catches a huge Marlin, which he beats to death with a Samoan war club. The fishing boat returns to the dock, with Thompson screaming triumphantly, "I am Lono!", referring to the ancient Hawaiian god which upsets the locals, and he goes into hiding in the City of Refuge. The story frequently breaks away to excerpts from The Last Voyage of Captain James Cook by Richard Hough, which tells the story of the man the native Hawaiians thought was the reincarnation of Lono and was eventually killed by them when he overstayed his welcome on the island of Hawaii.

== Criticism ==
Due to his dependence on alcohol and other drugs, Thompson struggled so badly to write The Curse of Lono that his editor, Alan Rinzler, had to steal the manuscript, which was partially written on scraps of paper. Lacking substance and coherence, the text was hastily assembled and then padded with quotes from other books, with a heavy paper used in order to make it seem more substantial. Rinzler admitted that “It was a patchwork, a cut-and-paste job. It doesn’t quite make sense.” Elsewhere, he called it “disorganized and incoherent in places.” Rob Fleder, Thompson's editor at Playboy, struggled to find parts to excerpt, calling The Curse of Lono "mostly a series of false starts and half-baked ideas. I was surprised by the degree of degeneration in Hunter’s work.” The book was poorly reviewed and was not reprinted until 2005 in a signed, limited edition, then more widely released in 2014. David S. Wills, in High White Notes: The Rise and Fall of Gonzo Journalism, dissected numerous problems with the book, including errors and repetitions, concluding that, "Few books have been more cynically foisted upon the public than The Curse of Lono."

== Film adaptation ==
In November 2017, it was announced that Steve Pink has signed on to direct the film adaptation from a script by JD Rosen. Production was to begin sometime in 2018.

== Citation ==
Thompson, Hunter S. The Curse of Lono. Taschen, 2006 (ISBN 3-8228-4897-2)
