= Screw-Jack =

Short story collection by Hunter S. Thompson

- Simon & Schuster edition
- Author: Hunter S. Thompson
- Language: English
- Genre: short story collection
- Publisher: Simon & Schuster (hardcover), Picador (paperback)
- Publication date: December 2000
- Publication place: United States
- Media type: Print (hardcover and paperback)
- Pages: 64
- ISBN: 9780684873213

Screw-Jack is a collection of short stories written by Hunter S. Thompson. It was first published by Maurice Neville in 1991 in a limited edition of 300 numbered and 26 lettered copies, then republished in 2000 by Simon & Schuster.

== Contents ==
=== "Mescalito" ===
"Mescalito", previously published in Thompson's 1990 collection Songs of the Doomed, is a drug-influenced account of a long wait for morning in a Los Angeles hotel while high on speed and mescaline, aided only when Oscar arrives with beer. The story then picks up on an airplane, where Thompson's trip turns dark and miserably comedic in typical Gonzo style.

=== "Death of a Poet" ===
"Death of a Poet" relates a visit to a friend's trailer home that takes a number of bizarre twists. The friend, F.X. Leach, was also a character in Thompson's 1992 Rolling Stone article Fear and Loathing in Elko, in which he is portrayed in an almost identical scenario, as a friend of not Thompson, but Justice Clarence Thomas. The "friend" F.X. Leach is actually a pen-name which Hunter occasionally wrote under.

=== "Screwjack" ===
Ostensibly written by Raoul Duke, "Screwjack" begins with an editor's note explaining of Thompson's alter ego that "the first few lines contain no warning of the madness and fear and lust that came more and more to plague him and dominate his life...." "I am guilty, Lord" Thompson writes, "but I am also a lover -- and I am one of your best people, as you know; and yea tho I have walked in many strange shadows and acted crazy from time to time and even drooled on many High Priests, I have not been an embarrassment to you...." The story appears to be a surreal and disjointed description of the bizarre, violent, and even sexual relationship between Raoul Duke and a black tomcat named Mr. Screwjack. Halfway through the text, there is a break in the text and the narrator briefly refers to Duke by name, implying this half is either told by another narrator or merely written by Duke briefly in the third person.
