= Fear and Loathing on the Campaign Trail '72 =

1973 book by Hunter S. Thompson

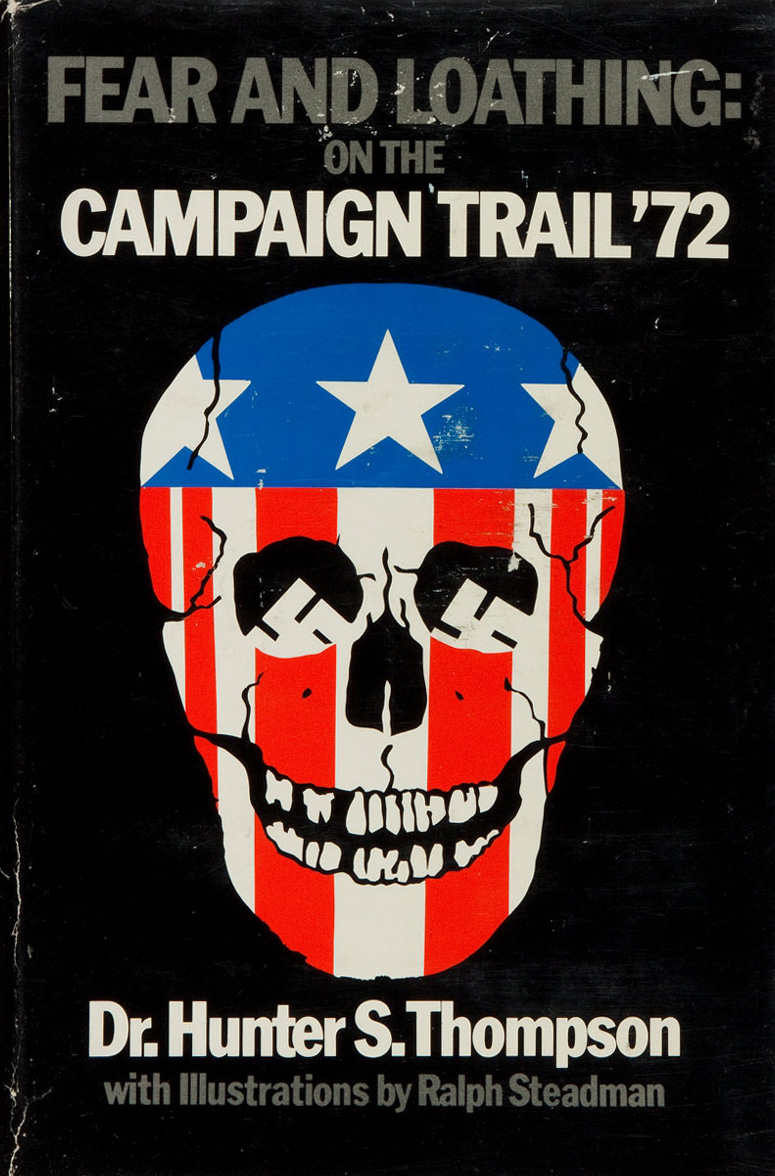
- First edition
- Author: Hunter S. Thompson
- Illustrator: Ralph Steadman
- Cover artist: Thomas W. Benton
- Language: English
- Genre: Gonzo journalism
- Publisher: Straight Arrow Books
- Publication date: 1973
- Publication place: United States
- Media type: Print (Hardback & Paperback)
- Pages: 506
- ISBN: 978-0-87932-053-9
- OCLC: 636410
- Dewey Decimal: 329/.023/730924
- LC Class: E859 .T52

Fear and Loathing on the Campaign Trail '72 is a 1973 book that recounts, analyzes, and sometimes fictionalizes the 1972 presidential campaign in which Richard Nixon was re-elected President of the United States. Written by Hunter S. Thompson and illustrated by Ralph Steadman, the book was largely derived from articles serialized in Rolling Stone throughout 1972. Like his earlier book Fear and Loathing in Las Vegas, Thompson employed a number of unique literary styles in On the Campaign Trail, including the use of vulgarity and the humorous exaggeration of events. Despite the unconventional style, the book is still considered a hallmark of campaign journalism and helped to launch Thompson's role as a popular political observer.

The book focuses almost exclusively on the Democratic Party's primaries and the breakdown of the party as it splits between the different candidates such as Ed Muskie and Hubert Humphrey. Of particular focus is the manic maneuvering of George McGovern's campaign during the Miami convention as they sought to ensure the Democratic nomination despite attempts by Humphrey and other candidates to block McGovern.

== Insider look at the political campaigns ==
A self-described political junkie, Thompson fixes his sights early on McGovern as the candidate to whom he will attach himself. Dismissing 1968 Democratic nominee Hubert Humphrey as a "hopeless old hack" and presumed nominee Senator Edmund Muskie, whose campaign Thompson says exudes a "stench of death", Thompson was vindicated in his choice of McGovern. The nomination of McGovern was not assured, however, as others in the Democratic Party attempted to recruit Ted Kennedy to run or focused on George Wallace's perceived ability to win the South.

Adopting an affect of brutal honesty, Thompson narrates the smallest decisions on what speech to give where (from school gymnasiums for young voters, to public halls in heavily Polish districts of Milwaukee, to the attempt to create buzz for Muskie through an old-fashioned and disastrous whistle-stop train tour through Florida dubbed the Sunshine Special) to McGovern's ill-fated selection of Thomas Eagleton as the Vice-Presidential candidate.

The book is notable for its introduction not only to the candidates of 1972 but also its early glimpses of future political leaders: Gary Hart of Colorado, who served as McGovern's campaign manager and would later win a seat in the U.S. Senate and Georgia Governor Jimmy Carter, who would himself capture the 1976 Democratic nomination and presidency, are two examples.

Thompson's hatred of Richard Nixon is on display throughout—in diatribes on policy, as well as personal invective directed at Nixon and his inner circle. Despite this, Thompson humanizes the incumbent through several episodes, including recounting a private interview with Nixon in New Hampshire during the 1968 presidential election that largely focused on their mutual fascination with football. In later years and articles, Thompson recounted his amazement that Nixon was not just talking about football but that he seemed to have a "genuine interest" in the game, and often cited the encounter as further evidence of how Nixon's every public maneuver was politically calculated even if it hid his true self.

By the end of the 1972 campaign and its disastrous defeat for McGovern (who won only Massachusetts and Washington D.C., losing even his home state of South Dakota), Thompson was clearly thoroughly exhausted and burned out on the process of politics.

== Critique of journalism ==
As much as it is about the candidates and their various political processes, the book is equally a critical look at the mainstream media coverage of the campaigns and politics. Criticizing the various pundits and political "experts", Thompson rails against the often incestuous relationships between politicians and those who write about them. He cites as a well-known fact among political journalists the matter of Thomas Eagleton, the United States senator who was removed after just 18 days as McGovern's running mate, when news that he had previously undergone electroshock therapy for depression was broken through the press as a scandal of the press's own making.

This position of portraying the campaigns as much as a media compilation of the stories they wished to cover instead of presenting all the stories that occurred was widely recognized as depicting a previously unspoken truth. Frank Mankiewicz, McGovern's campaign manager, would often say in later years that the book, despite its embellishments, represented "the least factual, most accurate account" of the election.

Timothy Crouse, who provided supplemental coverage of the campaign for Rolling Stone, wrote a memoir called The Boys on the Bus (1973) that critically analyzes the coverage of the '72 presidential campaign. In the book, often a standard text in university journalism courses, Crouse echoes Thompson's observations on the pack journalism mentality of the reporters covering the campaign, who were greatly dependent on the access provided by the Nixon campaign staff. Crouse describes Thompson as the one reporter who broke from the pack, however, and later printings of The Boys on the Bus contain an introduction by Thompson.

== Methodology and creative process ==
Thompson began his coverage of the campaign in December 1971, just as the race toward the primaries was beginning, from a rented apartment in Washington, D.C. (a situation he compared to "living in an armed camp, a condition of constant fear"). Over the next twelve months, in voluminous detail, he covered every aspect of the campaign, from the smallest rally to the raucous conventions.

An early fax machine was procured for Thompson after he inquired about the device while visiting venture capitalist Max Palevsky, who concurrently served as chairman of Xerox and Rolling Stone for several years in the early 1970s. Dubbing it "the mojo wire", Thompson used the nascent technology to capitalize on the freewheeling nature of the campaign and extend the writing process precariously close to printing deadlines, often haphazardly sending in notes mere hours before the magazine went to press. Fellow writers and editors would have to assemble the finished product with Thompson over the phone.
