= Fear and Loathing at Rolling Stone =

2009 book

Fear and Loathing at Rolling Stone: The Essential Writings of Hunter S. Thompson
- First edition
- Author: Hunter S. Thompson
- Language: English
- Genre: Non-fiction
- Publisher: Little Brown & Co
- Publication date: 2009
- Publication place: United Kingdom
- Pages: 512

Fear and Loathing at Rolling Stone: The Essential Writings of Hunter S. Thompson is a 2009 book that collects "the finest work" by Hunter S. Thompson during his 40-year stint at Rolling Stone. The book was edited by Jann S. Wenner, co-founder and publisher of Rolling Stone.
