= The Rum Diary (novel) =

Novel by Hunter S. Thompson

- First US edition
- Author: Hunter S. Thompson
- Language: English
- Publisher: Simon & Schuster (US); Bloomsbury Publishing Plc (UK)
- Publication date: 1998
- Publication place: United States
- Media type: Print
- Pages: 213 pp
- ISBN: 0-684-85521-6
- OCLC: 42751248
- Preceded by: Hell's Angels: A Strange and Terrible Saga

The Rum Diary is an early novel by American writer Hunter S. Thompson. It was written in the early 1960s but was not published until 1998. The manuscript, begun in 1959, was discovered among Thompson's papers by Johnny Depp. The story involves a journalist named Paul Kemp who, in the 1950s, moves from New York to work for a major newspaper, The Daily News, in San Juan, Puerto Rico. It is Thompson's second novel, preceded by the still-unpublished Prince Jellyfish.

== Background ==
Set in the late 1950s, the novel encompasses a tangled love story involving jealousy, treachery and violent alcoholic lust among the Americans who staff the newspaper. Thompson himself travelled from New York to San Juan in 1960 to write for an ill-fated sports newspaper on the island of Puerto Rico. He had unsuccessfully applied to work at the larger English-language daily called The San Juan Star which novelist William J. Kennedy edited. While in Puerto Rico, Thompson befriended many of the writers at the Star, providing the context for The Rum Diary's fictional storyline.

Although Thompson wrote his narrative at the age of 22, it deals extensively with a fear of "going over the hill" and growing old. The prominent characters are typical of Thompson's work: violent, maniacal and alcoholic, stumbling through life. The narrative uses a highly paced and rather exciting style, also typical of Thompson's oeuvre. Thompson himself stated that he wanted to write the Great American Novel. "I still can't beat that goddamn Gatsby."

Thompson finished a draft of The Rum Diary in the early sixties but continued to work on it throughout that decade, ultimately selling it to Random House after they agreed to publish his first book, Hell's Angels. However, he felt that the more time passed, the more difficult it was to write about an increasingly distant era. After missing various deadlines, he gave up on The Rum Diary until 1998, when it was finally published.

Parts of the novel were published in 1990 in Thompson's collection, Songs of the Doomed. In these excerpts, it is possible to see how the manuscript was changed before its final publication. David S. Wills wrote in High White Notes: The Rise and Fall of Gonzo Journalism that the original manuscript, as well as the 1990s excerpts, were "littered with" racial epithets and racist depictions, but that these had almost all been removed by the time it was released as a book.

When it was published in 1998, The Rum Diary was billed as "The Long Lost Novel" but it had never in fact been lost. Thompson had always felt it was too weak to sell, but now he needed money. His assistant, Lynn Nesbit, explained: "The Rum Diary came out when it did because he needed money, absolutely. He never would've published that twenty years before." The book sold well but Thompson was disappointed, calling it "the sloppiest job of Book Publishing I've ever seen."

== Film adaptation ==
The Rum Diary has been adapted into a film. Bruce Robinson wrote the screenplay and directed the film, which stars Johnny Depp as journalist Paul Kemp. Filming took place in Puerto Rico during 2009. It was released on October 28, 2011.
