= The Boys on the Bus =

1973 book

- 2003 printing
- Author: Timothy Crouse
- Cover artist: Ralph Steadman
- Publication date: 1973

The Boys on the Bus (1973) is a non-fiction book by author Timothy Crouse detailing life on the road for reporters covering the 1972 United States presidential election.

The book was one of the first treatises on pack journalism ever to be published, following in the footsteps of Gay Talese's 1969 "fly on the wall" look into the New York Times called The Kingdom and the Power.

The Boys on the Bus evolved out of several articles Crouse had written for Rolling Stone. When released, the book became a best-seller.

Several notable reporters are at turns critiqued, lampooned and glorified in the book, including R.W. "Johnny" Apple, Robert Novak, Walter Mears, Haynes Johnson, David Broder, Hunter S. Thompson, Thomas Oliphant, Curtis Wilkie, Carl Leubsdorf, and Jules Witcover. Politicians discussed include Richard Nixon and George McGovern. Later editions of the book contain a foreword by Thompson.

== See also ==
- Fear and Loathing on the Campaign Trail '72
- 1972 United States presidential election
