= Pack journalism =

Pack journalism is the characterization of news reporting in which reporters from different news outlets collaborate to cover the same story, leaving news reporting homogeneous. This is the practice whereby reporters use the same sources of information for their stories. This not only refers to print sources but people who provide quotes and information for stories too. When reporters need to cover a specific person for a story, these individuals will often move from place to place, and crowd together in masses at the scenes of newsworthy locations just for comments and/or quotes from individuals involved. While this is considered proper reporting, when reporters from several news outlets take the same steps to cover the same story, it leaves news virtually unvaried.

Overall, the occurrence of pack journalism is largely due to reporters' reliance on one another for news tips and use of one single source for their information (which could often even be the very subject they're covering). "Group think" occurs, as journalists are constantly aware of what others are reporting on, and an informal consensus emerges on what is newsworthy.

While pack journalism has had a presence in news reporting for quite some time, it initially gained meaning in political journalism surrounding the campaign of the 1972 Presidential election. Since then, it has continued to become more prominent in reporting and more common for news organizations.

== History ==
The term was first coined by Timothy Crouse in response to his observation during the 1972 Nixon and McGovern presidential election. The coverage of this particular campaign was deplored in depth by Crouse in his 1973 book The Boys on the Bus. Journalists were following candidates on the campaign trail as a group, often crowding together and spending time comparing notes. While the intent was to write unique stories for respective news organizations, journalists were working together so much that it became impossible for even the most self-reliant journalists to separate their notes from others. News organizations and media outlets were taking on the role of determining who the most popular candidate was among the public. Crouse noted what reporters knew well was not the American electorate but the much smaller community of the press plane. Crouse felt campaign journalism is what ultimately paved the road to pack journalism.

Modern pack journalism practices no longer require a physical proximity of campaign buses or shared press rooms. Journalists continue to conform to the pack from their phone screens just in monitoring and imitating other reporters online.

== Consequences ==
Pack journalism is currently widely connected with political journalism and remains a widespread issue in reporting. Pack journalism leads to a lazier approach whereby it is not necessary for reporters to compile information on their own because other reporters have already done so. This, in turn, leads to numerous news organizations highlighting and/or publishing similar or even identical stories. While it is common for the same news event to be covered by various news organizations, when the stories are covered from the same perspectives and use the same quotes, the news is left virtually unvaried.

A significant short term consequence of pack journalism is that it turns minor news stories into national headlines. While these stories might be worthy of coverage, their widespread influence on the public causes people to lose sight of other important newsworthy stories elsewhere in the world.

A major long term consequence of this kind of journalism is that it reduces news reporting to a competition with news organizations competing over breaking stories. This results in the public missing out on other important news. Readers and viewers of news might not take this kind of reporting seriously, and they might not feel the news is a reliable source of information.

When pack journalism is connected with political journalism, there is an under-representation of minority parties that results from the media's focus on one prominent party over another. Watching and reporting on one person over and over provides viewers with one perspective on the race and leads to a shortsighted view of the campaign overall. Conformity within the news has been related to "agenda setting", which is the result of the press's influence over audiences in conveying to the people which events are important simply by covering them.

Potential positives stem from this practice, too. The individual journalist who releases a story has widespread influence, and the story, in turn, receives widespread attention. In the United States, when a reporter breaks an important story to the media, other news organizations pick it up and spread it further. This ultimately keeps stories alive, and leads to a story's impact on viewers.

== Criticism ==
The unethical nature of pack journalism is further explored through social responsibility theory. According to the Hutchins Commission, social responsibility theory states that the press must be responsible for publishing information to the public in an honest manner. The Hutchins Commission argued that unless reliable, complete coverage of news is included in each news organization, the public would be ignorant and misled by the media – in this case, pack journalism. According to the Hutchins Commission, the five standards news organizations should meet are as follows:

1. A truthful, comprehensive, and intelligent account of the day's events in a context which gives them meaning.
2. A forum for the exchange of comment and criticism.
3. The projection of a representative picture of the constituent groups in the society.
4. The presentation and clarification of the goals and values of the society.
5. Full access to the day's intelligence

Pack journalism contradicts these recommended standards.
