= Ralph Steadman =

Welsh illustrator and cartoonist (born 1936)

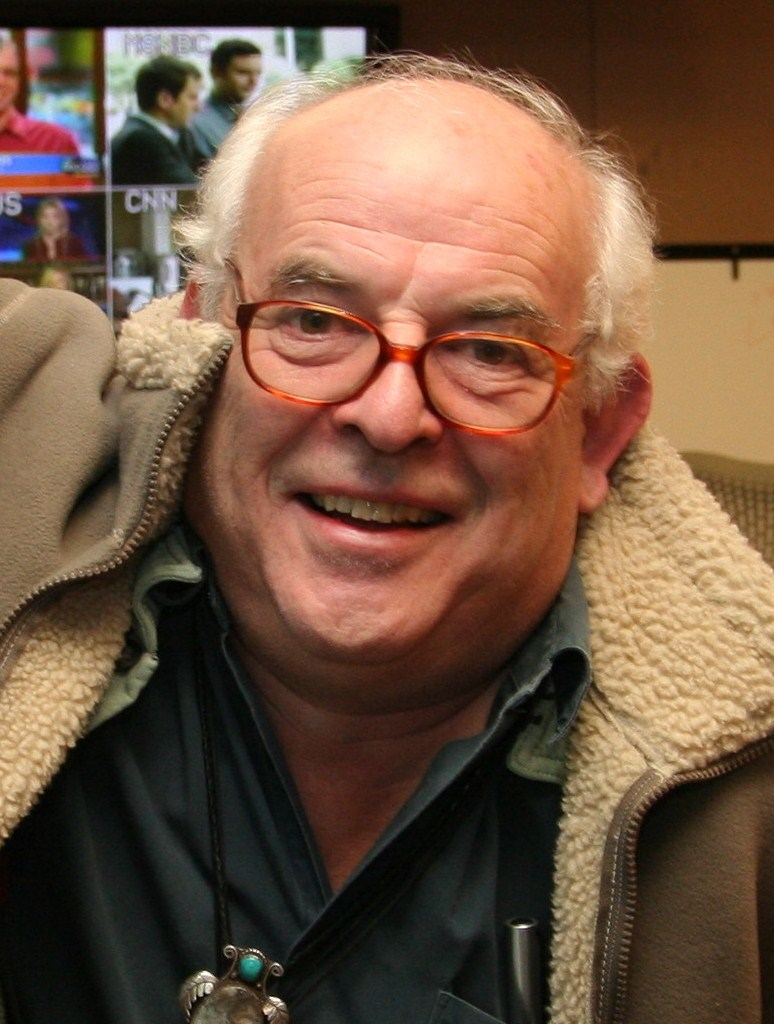
- Steadman in 2006
- Born: Ralph Idris Steadman; 15 May 1936 (age 90); Wallasey, Cheshire, England
- Education: East Ham Technical College; London College of Printing
- Occupations: Illustrator and cartoonist
- Known for: Painting, drawing, caricatures, cartoons
- Website: www.ralphsteadman.com

Ralph Idris Steadman (born 15 May 1936) is a Welsh illustrator and was a collaborator with the American writer Hunter S. Thompson (1937–2005). Steadman draws satirical political cartoons, social caricatures, and picture books.

== Early life ==
Steadman was born in Wallasey, Cheshire, to an English father, Lionel Raphael Steadman, and a Welsh mother, Gwendoline; the family moved to Wales towards the end of the Second World War. Steadman attended the grammar school in Abergele in north Wales but hated the draconian, sadistic new headmaster and left aged 16. "I couldn't wait to get out," he said. He came from a lower middle class background; his father was a commercial traveller and his mother was a shop assistant at T. J. Hughes in Liverpool.

Steadman took his first job at 16 as a radar operator at the De Havilland aircraft factory in the border town of Broughton near Chester but only remained for nine months, finding factory life repetitive and dull, and becoming fed up with fellow employees, citing persistent cruel practical jokes ("They were always putting stuff in your tea"); however, while there he became skilled in technical drawing, thus sowing the seeds of his future career.

Steadman returned to England after National Service in 1954 and found work in London as a cartoonist. Wishing to accelerate his progress he enrolled in 1959 at East Ham Technical College and the London College of Printing during the 1960s, doing freelance work for Punch, Private Eye, The Daily Telegraph, The New York Times and Rolling Stone during this time.

== Career ==
=== Collaborations with Hunter S. Thompson ===
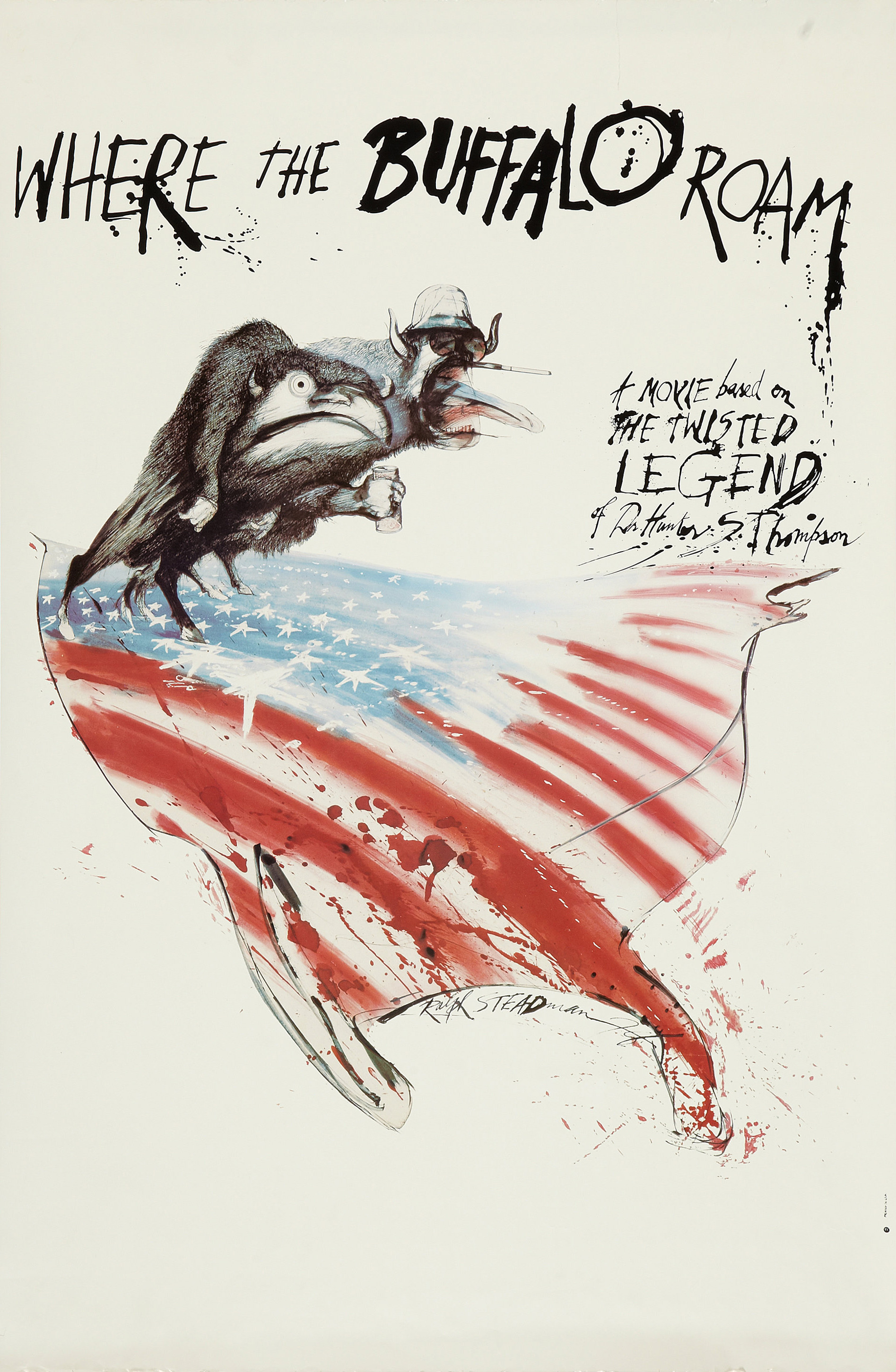
Steadman's film poster for Where the Buffalo Roam (1980).

Steadman had a long partnership with the American journalist and writer Hunter S. Thompson, drawing pictures for many of his articles and books. He accompanied Thompson to the Kentucky Derby for an article for the magazine Scanlan's, to the Honolulu Marathon for the magazine Running, and illustrated both Fear and Loathing in Las Vegas and Fear and Loathing on the Campaign Trail '72.

Steadman has expressed regret at selling the original illustrations for Fear and Loathing in Las Vegas at the advice of his agent to Rolling Stone founder Jann Wenner for the sum of $75, a fraction of their later value. As a result of that transaction, Steadman has largely refused to sell any of his original artwork and has been quoted as saying: "If anyone owns a Steadman original, it's stolen." While there are original pieces held outside of his archive, they are exceedingly rare. The artist has kept possession of the vast bulk of his original artwork.

Steadman appears on the second disc of The Criterion Collection Fear and Loathing in Las Vegas DVD set, in a documentary called Fear and Loathing in Gonzovision, which was made by the BBC in 1978, of Thompson planning the tower and cannon that his ashes were later blasted out of. The cannon was atop a 153-ft. tower of Thompson's fist gripping a peyote button; Thompson demanding that Steadman gives the fist two thumbs, "Right now."

=== Other illustration work ===
As well as writing and illustrating his own books and Thompson's, Steadman has worked with writers including Ted Hughes, Adrian Mitchell and Brian Patten, and also illustrated editions of Alice in Wonderland, Treasure Island, Animal Farm, the English translation of Flann O'Brien's Gaelic-language classic The Poor Mouth, and most recently, Fahrenheit 451.

Steadman has drawn album covers for numerous music artists, including the Who, Exodus, Frank Zappa, Nils Lofgren and Ambrosia, as well as the lead banner for the gonzo journalism website GonzoToday.com.

Among the British public, Steadman is well known for his illustrations for the catalogues of the off-licence chain Oddbins.

In 1985, Steadman designed a set of four British postage stamps to commemorate the appearance that year of Halley's Comet.

Steadman has illustrated Will Self's column in The Independent newspaper.

Steadman has contributed to BirdLife International's Preventing Extinctions programme with an image of critically endangered northern bald ibis.

In 2014, Steadman created the artwork for a series of limited edition Breaking Bad SteelBook DVDs. These works were the subject of an exhibition at 71a Gallery in Hackney, London, in February 2015.

In 2016, Steadman did the cover art for Anthony Bourdain's cookbook Appetites.

In 2017, Steadman penned the artwork for Travis Scott and Quavo's joint project Huncho Jack, Jack Huncho.

In 2019, Steadman created the artwork for Taylor Mac's Broadway show Gary: A Sequel to Titus Andronicus.

In 2020, Steadman created the artwork for the documentary film Freak Power: The Ballot or the Bomb, which follows journalist Hunter S. Thompson and his 1970 campaign for sheriff of Pitkin County, Colorado.

=== Beer labels and freedom of speech ===
Steadman has designed label art for Flying Dog beer and designed the V logo used on Flying Dog's packaging since 1995. The logo includes an original motto by Steadman: "Good Beer No Shit". Because of this, and because of Steadman's controversial label art for the craft brewery's Road Dog ale and Doggie Style ale, a complaint of obscenity was filed against Flying Dog. The Colorado State Liquor Board then had Flying Dog beers pulled from store shelves. Flying Dog and the American Civil Liberties Union sued the state of Colorado while the displayed motto was changed to "Good Beer No Censorship". In 2001, the Colorado Supreme Court entered final judgment in favour of Flying Dog, based on the First Amendment to the United States Constitution, (freedom of speech).

In 2009, the Michigan Liquor Control Commission banned Flying Dog's "Raging Bitch Belgian-Style IPA" beer, partly for the name and partly for Steadman's label art. In 2015, the Court of Appeals for the Sixth Circuit struck down the ban on first amendment grounds and recommended civil damages against the state of Michigan.

In an article since deleted from its website, Flying Dog stated that its Cardinal "Spiced" Zin' wine was banned in Ohio for Steadman's "disturbing" interpretation of a Catholic cardinal on its label.

In 2018, Flying Dog received a complaint in the United Kingdom about the packaging of its "Easy IPA" reduced-alcohol beer. The complaint partially involved Steadman's label art, depicting a tipsy cartoon character. The Portman Group, a third-party organization which evaluates alcohol-related marketing in the UK, has accepted the complaint's allegation that the artwork "could be seen as encouraging drunkenness", particularly among minors, and has issued an advisory.

In 2021, Flying Dog sued the North Carolina Alcoholic Beverage Control Commission for violation of free speech provisions after the NC ABC rejected the label for the brewery's "Freezin' Season" beer as "inappropriate".

=== Music and writing ===
In 1980, Steadman wrote a 57-second song, "Sweetest Love (Lament after a Broken Sashcord on a Theme by John Donne)", for an album he was illustrating, Miniatures: A Sequence of Fifty-One Tiny Masterpieces (edited by Morgan Fisher), on Pipe Records. Steadman sang the song to Fisher's harmonium accompaniment.

In 1999, Steadman wrote the lyrics for Richard Harvey's choral album Plague and the Moonflower, on Altus Records.

Also in 1999, Steadman released an anthology album of his "favourite music", on EMI Records, entitled I Like It. Two pieces of his own music are included, "Weird & Twisted Nights" (listed as a collaboration with Hunter S. Thompson and someone named Mc Dean) and "Sweetest Love I Do Not Go" (the same 57-second piece he released in 1980). The album comes with a "songbook", which has text by Steadman.

Hal Willner and Johnny Depp's 2006 anthology of songs, Rogue's Gallery: Pirate Ballads, Sea Songs, and Chanteys contains two contributions from Steadman. He sings lead on "Little Boy Billee" and sings backing vocals for Eliza Carthy on "Rolling Sea".

In 2011, Steadman began running prose and poetry in Kotori Magazine.

In 2015, Steadman released a 7-inch vinyl single on Philthy Phonograph Records, "The Man Who Woke Up in the Dark" B/w "Striped Paint".

In 2020, Chronicle Chroma published the definitive book on Steadman's work and career, A Life in Ink by Ralph Steadman.

== Awards ==
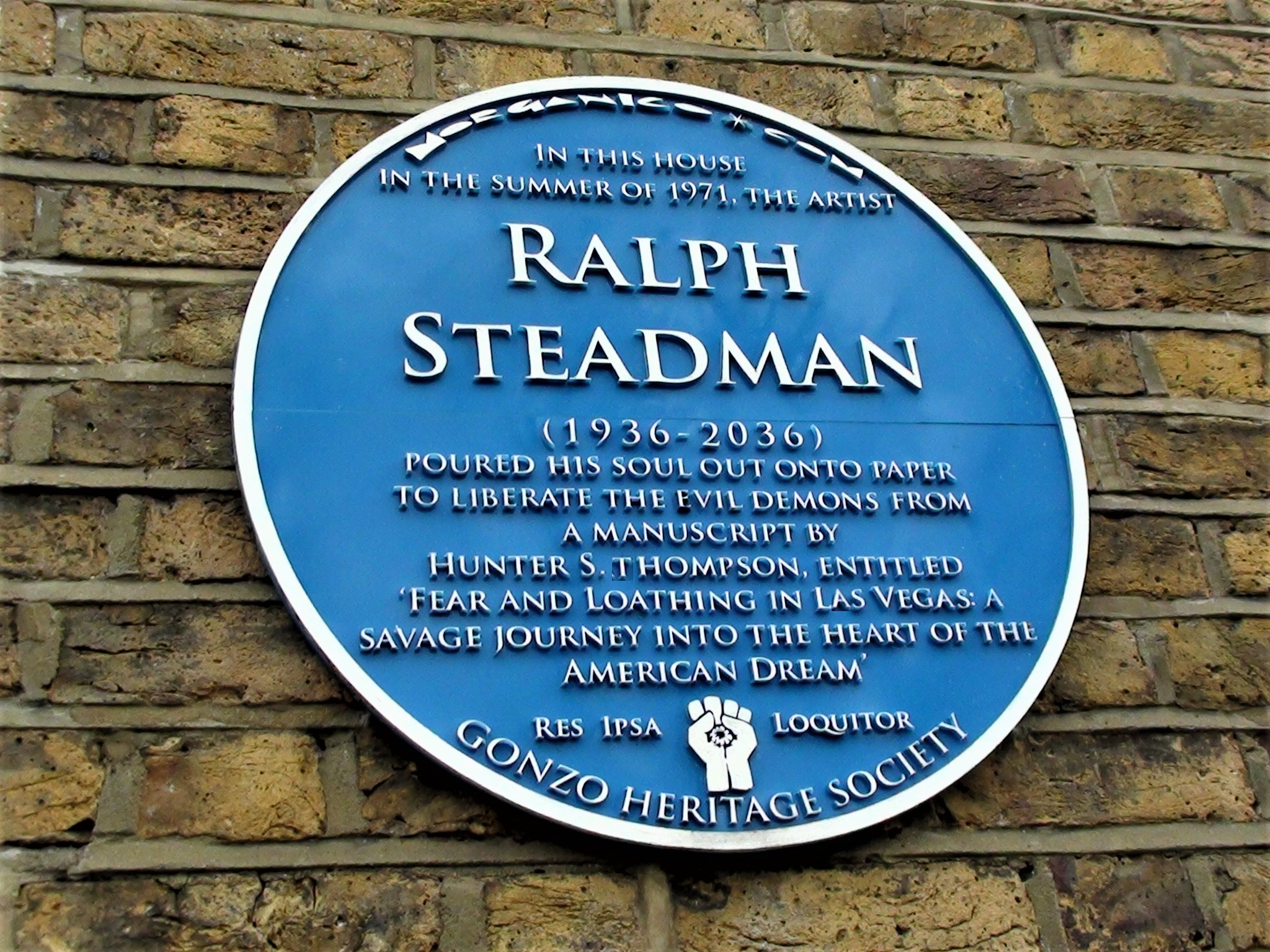
Blue plaque on a house on the New King's Road, London SW6

Awards that he has won for his work include the Francis Williams Book Illustration Award for Alice in Wonderland, the American Society of Illustrators' Certificate of Merit, the W H Smith Illustration Award for I Leonardo, the Dutch Silver Paintbrush Award for Inspector Mouse, the Italian Critica in Erba Prize for That's My Dad, the BBC Design Award for postage stamps, the Black Humour Award in France, and several Designers and Art Directors Association Awards. He was voted Illustrator of the Year by the American Institute of Graphic Arts in 1979.

=== Film documentary ===
A major documentary about Steadman's career, For No Good Reason, directed by Charlie Paul, played at the 2013 Toronto International Film Festival in the "Mavericks" programme. The film, reportedly 15 years in the making, played in New York City and Los Angeles in December 2013, and was given US domestic release in spring 2014. The film was in competition for the Grierson Award for Best Documentary at the 2012 BFI London Film Festival.

== Personal life ==
Steadman is a member of the Chelsea Arts Club.

He is a patron of the Association of Illustrators.

Steadman lives in Kent. His second wife, Anna, died in February 2022. He has five children.

== Selected works ==
- The Little Red Computer (1968)
- Still Life with Raspberry or the Bumper Book of Steadman (1969)
- "The Kentucky Derby Is Decadent and Depraved" (1970) (written by Hunter S. Thompson)
- Fear and Loathing in Las Vegas (1971) (written by Hunter S. Thompson)
- Two Donkeys and a Bridge (1972)
- Fear and Loathing on the Campaign Trail '72 (1973) (written by Hunter S. Thompson)
- America (1974)
- Cherrywood Cannon, based on a story told by Dmitri Sidjanski, Paddington Press (1978)
- Emergency Mouse (1978) (written by Bernard Stone)
- Who is Eddie Linden? (1979) (biography of poet Eddie Linden, written by Sebastian Barker)
- The Curse of Lono (1983) (written by Hunter S. Thompson)
- Inspector Mouse (1980) (written by Bernard Stone)
- Road Island (1982) by Ambrosia
- I Leonardo (1983)
- No Good Dogs (1983)
- Sir Henry at N'didi's Kraal (Vivian Stanshall)
- Quasimodo Mouse (1984) (written by Bernard Stone)
- Treasure Island (1985) (written by Robert Louis Stevenson)
- That's My Dad (1986)
- The Complete Alice (1986) (Through the Looking-Glass and The Hunting of the Snark, written by Lewis Carroll)
- Withnail and I (1987)
- The Crazy Never Die! by Mitchell Brothers Film Group (1988)
- The Big I Am (1988)
- No Room to Swing a Cat (1989)
- Near the Bone (1990)
- Tales of the Weirrd (1990)
- Force of Habit (1992) (album by Exodus)
- The Grapes of Ralph: Wine according to Ralph Steadman (1992)
- Still Life with Bottle: Whisky according to Ralph Steadman (1994)
- Teddy! Where Are You? (1995)
- Animal Farm (1995) (written by George Orwell)
- The Poor Mouth (1996) – English translation of the 1941 novel An Béal Bocht
- Heart on the Left (1997)
- Have I Offended Someone? (1997) (Frank Zappa compilation)
- Sigmund Freud (1997)
- The Mildenhall Treasure (2000) (written by Roald Dahl)
- Gonzo: The Art of Ralph Steadman (1998); also known as Gonzo the Art
- "Doodaaa: The Balletic Art of Gavin Twinge" (Bloomsbury, 2002)
- The Devil's Dictionary (2004) (written by Ambrose Bierce)
- Psychogeography (2007) (written by Will Self)
- Garibaldi's Biscuits (2008)
- Slash (2010) (album by Slash)
- Little.com (2014)
- "Extinct Boids" (2012)
- "Proud Too Be Weirrd" (2013)
- "Nextinction" (2014)
- Huncho Jack, Jack Huncho (2017) (Travis Scott and Quavo album)
- "Critical Critters" (2020)

=== Autobiographical writings ===
- Between the Eyes (1984).
- The Joke's Over: Bruised Memories—Gonzo, Hunter S. Thompson, and Me (2006).
- Appetites: A Cookbook (2016). Ecco Press. ISBN 9780062409959.
