= Hell's Angels (book) =

1966 book by Hunter S. Thompson

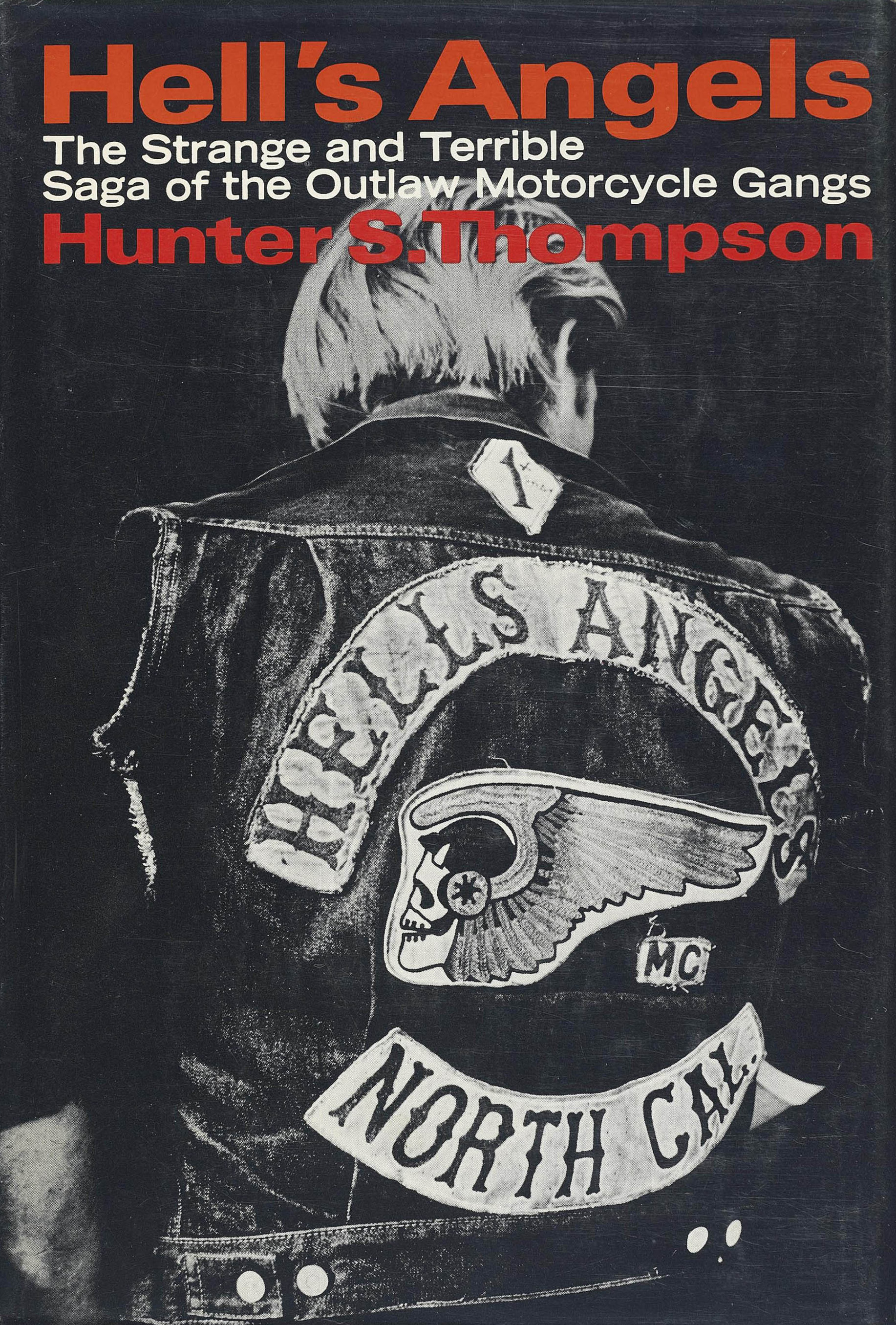
- First edition
- Author: Hunter S. Thompson
- Original title: Hell's Angels: The Strange and Terrible Saga of the Outlaw Motorcycle Gangs
- Language: English
- Genre: Gonzo journalism
- Publisher: Random House
- Publication date: 1966
- Publication place: United States
- Media type: Print (hardcover and paperback)
- Pages: 278
- ISBN: 0-394-42819-6
- LC Class: 66-18327

Hell's Angels: A Strange and Terrible Saga (originally published with the subtitle The Strange and Terrible Saga of the Outlaw Motorcycle Gangs) is a book written by Hunter S. Thompson, published in 1966 by Random House. It was widely lauded for its up-close and uncompromising look at the Hells Angels motorcycle club, during a time when the gang was highly feared and accused of numerous criminal activities. The New York Times described Thompson's portrayal as "a world most of us would never dare encounter."

It was Thompson's first published book and his first attempt at a nonfiction novel.

== Origins ==
Hell's Angels began as the article "The Motorcycle Gangs: Losers and Outsiders" written by Thompson for the May 17, 1965 issue of The Nation. In March 1965, The Nation editor Carey McWilliams wrote to Thompson and offered to pay the journalist for an article on the subject of motorcycle gangs, and the Hells Angels in particular. Thompson took the job, and the article, published about a month later, prompted book offers from several publishers interested in the topic.

Thompson spent the next year preparing for the new book in close quarters with the Hells Angels, in particular the San Francisco and Oakland chapters of the club and their president Ralph "Sonny" Barger. Thompson was upfront with the Angels about his role as a journalist, a dangerous move given their marked distrust of reporters from what the club considered to be bad press. Thompson was introduced to the gang by Birney Jarvis, a former club member and then police-beat reporter for the San Francisco Chronicle. This introduction, coming from an Angel and reporter, allowed Thompson to get close to the gang.

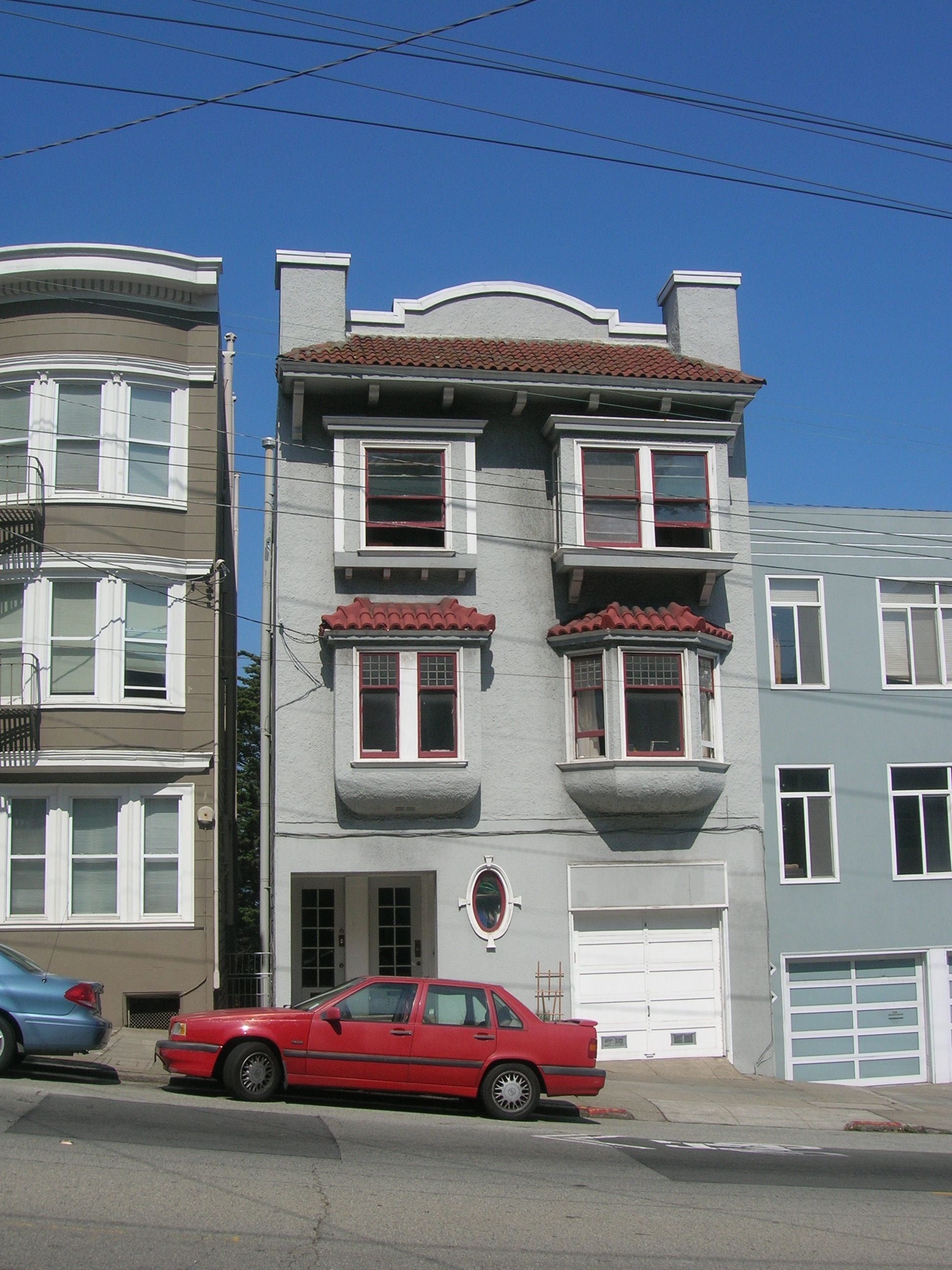
Thompson's residence during the Hell's Angels period at 318 Parnassus Avenue, San Francisco

Far from being wary of this outsider, the Angels were sincere in their participation, often talking at length into Thompson's tape recorder and reviewing early drafts of the article to ensure he had his facts straight. The gang often visited his apartment at 318 Parnassus Avenue in San Francisco, much to the dismay of his wife and neighbors. Thompson, however, felt comfortable with the arrangement. When "jokingly" threatened with violence, he pointed to a loaded double-barreled shotgun that he kept hanging on his wall and replied in a similar vein that he would "croak two of them first."

Thompson remained close with the Angels for a year, but ultimately the relationship waned. It ended for good after several members of the gang gave him a savage beating or "stomping" over a remark made by Thompson to an Angel named Junkie George, who was beating his wife. Thompson said: "Only a punk beats his wife and dog." The beating stopped only when senior members of the club ordered it. Thompson had essentially ended his time with the Angels by then, but he later noted in letters to friends and Sonny Barger that the members who had participated in the beating had not been those with whom he had most closely associated. He continued being fond of Barger, writing in his 1971 book Fear and Loathing in Las Vegas: "Sonny Barger never quite got the hang of it, but he'll never know how close he was to a king-hell breakthrough."

== Plot and themes ==
The book details Thompson's experiences living with the Hells Angels, a notorious motorcycle club in California. The author spent over a year embedded with one chapter, learning their unique subculture and immersing himself in their lifestyle. He recounts his time spent traveling through California by motorcycle, and describes the contrast between the general lawlessness of the club and the exaggerated fear that very lawlessness engenders in society.

In a contemporary New York Times review of the book, Thompson relates how he "drank at their bars, exchanged home visits, recorded their brutalities, viewed their sexual caprices, became converted to their motorcycle mystique, and was so intrigued, as he puts it, that 'I was no longer sure whether I was doing research on the Hell's Angels or being slowly absorbed by them.'"

The book's epigraph is a translation of François Villon's 15th-century poem Ballade du concours de Blois:

In my own country I am in a far-off land
I am strong but have no force or power
I win all yet remain a loser
At break of day I say goodnight
When I lie down I have a great fear
Of falling.

== Effects and criticism ==
Hell's Angels was the book that launched Thompson's career as a writer. Even though by this point in his career he had published numerous articles for various journals and newspapers and was recognized as a journalist, the book was his first true exposure to a national audience. Reviews of the work were generally very positive and despite a poor performance on the publicity tour by Thompson, who was by his own admission drunk or exhausted for nearly every interview, the book sold relatively well. Even so, Thompson himself made little from the royalties from early editions of the book, a misfortune he blamed on a succession of agents and the book's publisher, Random House.

Thompson's treatment of a gang-rape by Hells Angels was criticized by feminist Susan Brownmiller in her 1975 book Against Our Will: Men, Women, and Rape.
