= Timothy Crouse =

American journalist and writer

Timothy Crouse (born 1947) is an American journalist and writer.

== Family ==
Crouse is the son of Anna (née Erskine) and Russel Crouse. His maternal grandparents were Pauline (Ives) and author, educator, and former Columbia professor John Erskine. Timothy Crouse's affinity for campaign reporters and the theater took root from his father, Russel Crouse, who was a career newspaperman and playwright. "The stories he told me of his newspaper days—especially traveling around the country with prankish sports teams—had a fatal tinge of romance about them," said Crouse. His father's career in theatre began in 1928 when he played Bellflower in the play Gentlemen of the Press. Later, his father turned his attention to writing. In 1934, he and his long-time partner Howard Lindsay together revised P. G. Wodehouse and Guy Bolton's book for the Cole Porter musical Anything Goes. "My father and Howard's trademark was a painstaking craftsmanship," says Crouse. "They spent months on an outline for a play, then worked on the dialogue, then rewrote and rewrote until everything was just right." And more than fifty years after his father collaborated on the original score, Timothy Crouse's revised libretto of Anything Goes opened on Broadway.

Crouse is the brother of actress Lindsay Crouse. He attended Harvard University.

== Early career ==
Crouse served as a Peace Corps Volunteer in Morocco from 1968 to 1969. Returning to the United States he wrote for the Boston Herald before joining the staff of Rolling Stone where he worked as a contributing editor from 1971 to 1972.

== The Boys on the Bus ==
Crouse is the author of The Boys on the Bus, a largely critical look at the journalists who covered the 1972 US presidential campaign. As a young Rolling Stone reporter he wrote music stories, but he wanted to try his hand at political reporting. At a 1972 Rolling Stone staff meeting the only other writer interested in covering the election was his colleague, the legendary writer Hunter S. Thompson, so Crouse latched onto him. "It only took a few days of riding the bus for me to see that the reporters themselves would make a great story," Crouse said. Crouse also profiled Hunter S. Thompson in the book. Thompson "wrote to provoke, shock, protest and annoy," wrote Crouse. Crouse also profiled R.W. Apple, the legendary reporter and editor at the New York Times. Reporters "recognized many of their own traits in him, grotesquely magnified. The shock of recognition frightened them. Apple was like them, only more blatant. He openly displayed the faults they tried to hide: the insecurity, the ambitiousness, the name-dropping" and "the weakness for powerful men." David Broder and Robert Novak are also profiled in the book. In the book, Crouse coins the term pack journalism. "The press likes to demonstrate its power by destroying lightweights, and pack journalism is never more doughty and complacent than when the pack has tacitly agreed that a candidate is a joke."

== Later work ==
After The Boys on the Bus, Crouse became the Washington columnist for Esquire and also wrote articles for The New Yorker and The Village Voice. In 1982 Crouse conceived the idea of reviving Anything Goes. He co-authored a new libretto for the musical with John Weidman that opened at the Vivian Beaumont Theater on October 19, 1987, and ran for 784 performances. They re-ordered the musical numbers, borrowing Cole Porter pieces from other Porter shows, a practice which the composer often engaged in. ("Easy To Love" was from the 1936 movie Born to Dance.) In 2002 the musical was produced at the Royal National Theatre in London. In 2000 Alfred A. Knopf published Crouse and Luc Brébion's translation of Nobel-prize winner Roger Martin du Gard's nearly 800-page memoir Lieutenant-Colonel de Maumort. Crouse has been working on fiction for the past several years and his story Sphinxes appeared in the Spring 2003 issue of Zoetrope: All-Story.
