= Gadget (disambiguation) =

A gadget is a small technological object such as a device or an appliance that has a particular function, but is often thought of as a novelty.

Gadget may also refer to:

== Media ==
- Gadget: Invention, Travel, & Adventure, also known as Gadget: Past as Future, a 1993 videogame
- The Gadget (novel), a 2001 young-adult novel by Paul Zindel

=== Characters ===
- GADGET, a robot character in the Doctor Who episode "The Waters of Mars"
- Gadget, a fictional robot from the Suikoden series of video games
- Gadget Hackwrench, a young female mouse from the TV series Chip 'n Dale Rescue Rangers
- Gadgets, a series of machine-type monsters in the Yu-Gi-Oh! Trading Card Game
- Gary "Gadget" Flowers, a character in the This Is England series of films
- Inspector Gadget, the titular character of the animated series of the same name

== People ==
- Fad Gadget (born 1956), British avant-garde electronic musician and vocalist
- Little Nobody (also Funk Gadget), Australian musician and writer
- Next Time Gadget (born 1980), American electronic musician
- Reverend Gadget, steel fabrication artist, craftsman, prop builder, and television personality

== Science ==
- "The Gadget" was the code name given to the first atomic bomb/device detonated at the "Trinity" nuclear test in July 1945

=== Technology ===
- GADGET, a free software for cosmological N-body/SPH simulations
- Gadget (computer science), a subset of a problem instance
- Gadget (machine instruction sequence), a sequence of computer instructions used in security exploit techniques
- Google Gadgets, dynamic web content that can be embedded on a web page
- Microsoft Gadgets, lightweight single-purpose applications

== See also ==
- Gizmo (disambiguation)
- Widget (disambiguation)
