= Lists of people on the United States cover of Rolling Stone =

The United States cover of Rolling Stone magazine has featured various celebrities. Many are musicians, but politicians, actors, comedians, sports figures, and fictional characters are also sometimes included. The Beatles, as individuals or as the band, have appeared over 30 times. Madonna has appeared on more covers than any other female with a total of 23 times as of 2018, either alone or in a "collage" cover; or dozen alone between 1984 and 2009.

This is a portal to a series of articles, separated by decades, listing the people who have appeared on issue covers of Rolling Stone since it premiered in 1967.

== 1960s–2020s ==
- List of people on the United States cover of Rolling Stone (1960s)
- List of people on the United States cover of Rolling Stone (1970s)
- List of people on the United States cover of Rolling Stone (1980s)
- List of people on the United States cover of Rolling Stone (1990s)
- List of people on the United States cover of Rolling Stone (2000s)
- List of people on the United States cover of Rolling Stone (2010s)
- List of people on the United States cover of Rolling Stone (2020s)
