= Magazine =

Publication that is typically distributed at a regular interval

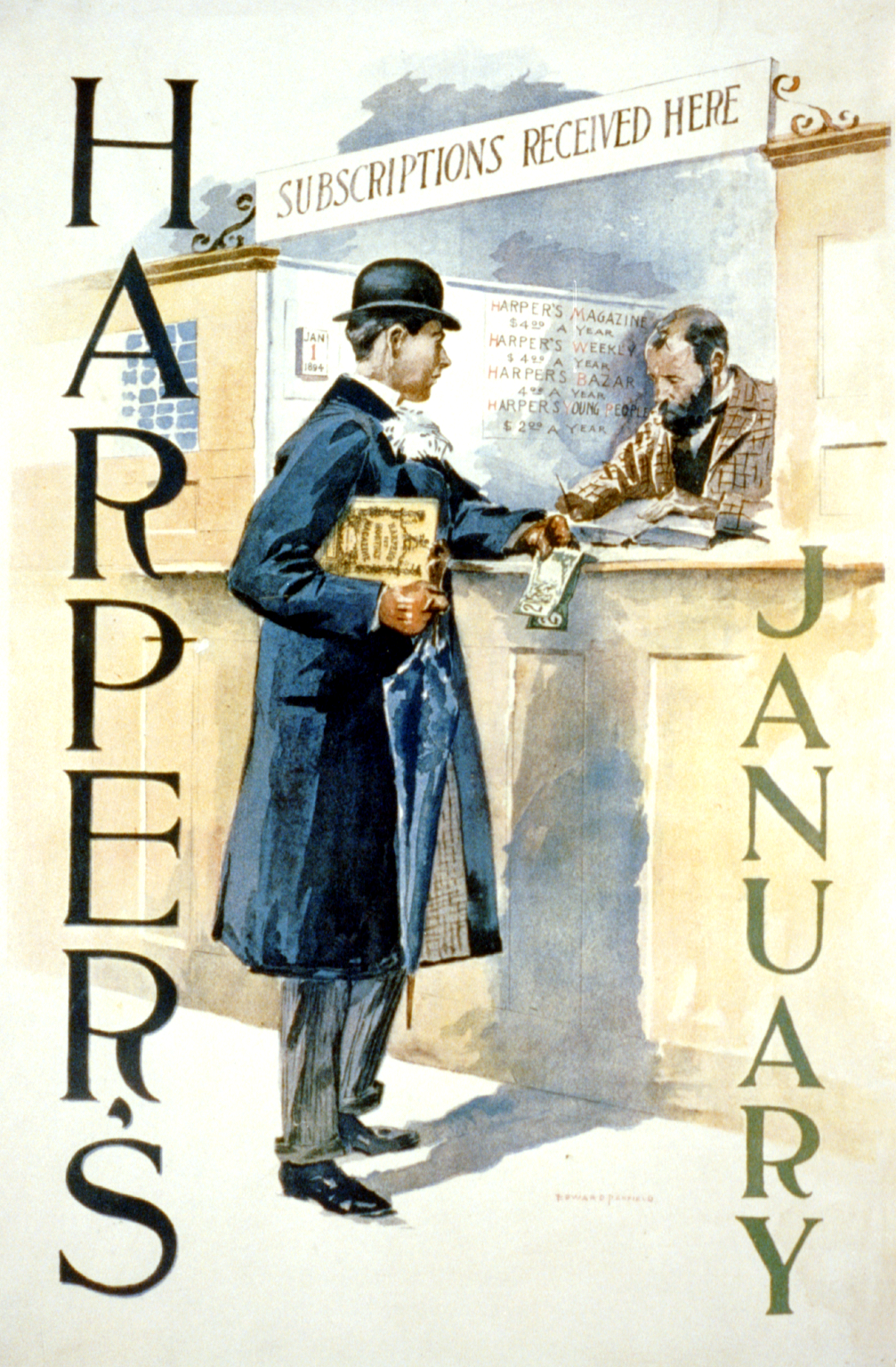
Harper's Monthly, a literary and political force in the late 19th century

A magazine is a periodical publication, print or digital, produced on a regular schedule, that contains any of a variety of subject-oriented textual and visual content forms. Magazines are generally financed by advertising, purchase price, prepaid subscriptions, or by a combination of the three. They are categorised by their frequency of publication (i.e., as weeklies, monthlies, quarterlies, etc.), their target audiences (e.g., women's and trade magazines), their subjects of focus (e.g., popular science and religious), and their tones or approach (e.g., works of satire or humor). Appearance on the cover of print magazines has historically been understood to convey a place of honor or distinction to an individual or event. In the 21st century, many traditional print magazines have transitioned entirely to digital formats or launched online editions to reach a global audience.

== Origin ==
The term magazine derives from the Semitic verb root hzn ("bank"). The specific etymology of the word "magazine" suggests derivation from the Arabic makhāzin (مخازن), the broken plural of makhzan (مخزن) meaning "depot, storehouse" (originally military storehouse); that comes to English via Middle French magasin and Italian magazzino. In its original sense, the word "magazine" referred to a storage space or device.

== Definitions ==
A magazine is a periodical publication, issued in print or digital form at regular intervals, that contains a collection of articles, essays, stories, photographs, illustrations, or other content intended for a particular audience. Magazines are typically published weekly, monthly, or quarterly and are distinguished from newspapers by their less frequent publication schedule, greater emphasis on feature content, and more specialized or targeted audience.

The publishing sense emerged in the eighteenth century, reflecting the idea of a publication serving as a "storehouse" of information.

In the case of written publication, it refers to a collection of written articles; hence, magazine publications share the moniker with storage units for military equipment such as gunpowder, artillery and firearm magazines, and in French and Russian (adopted from the French, as магазин), retailers such as department stores.

The difference between magazines and journals are their audience, purpose, and publication process. Journal articles are written by experts for experts, while magazine articles are usually intended for the general public or a demographic. Journals contain recent research on specific areas, while magazines aim to entertain, inform, or educate a general audience on a wide range of topics. Journals are published by academic or professional organizations, and may be peer-reviewed, while magazine articles are typically shorter and more accessible than journal articles, often written in a journalistic style.

== Distribution ==
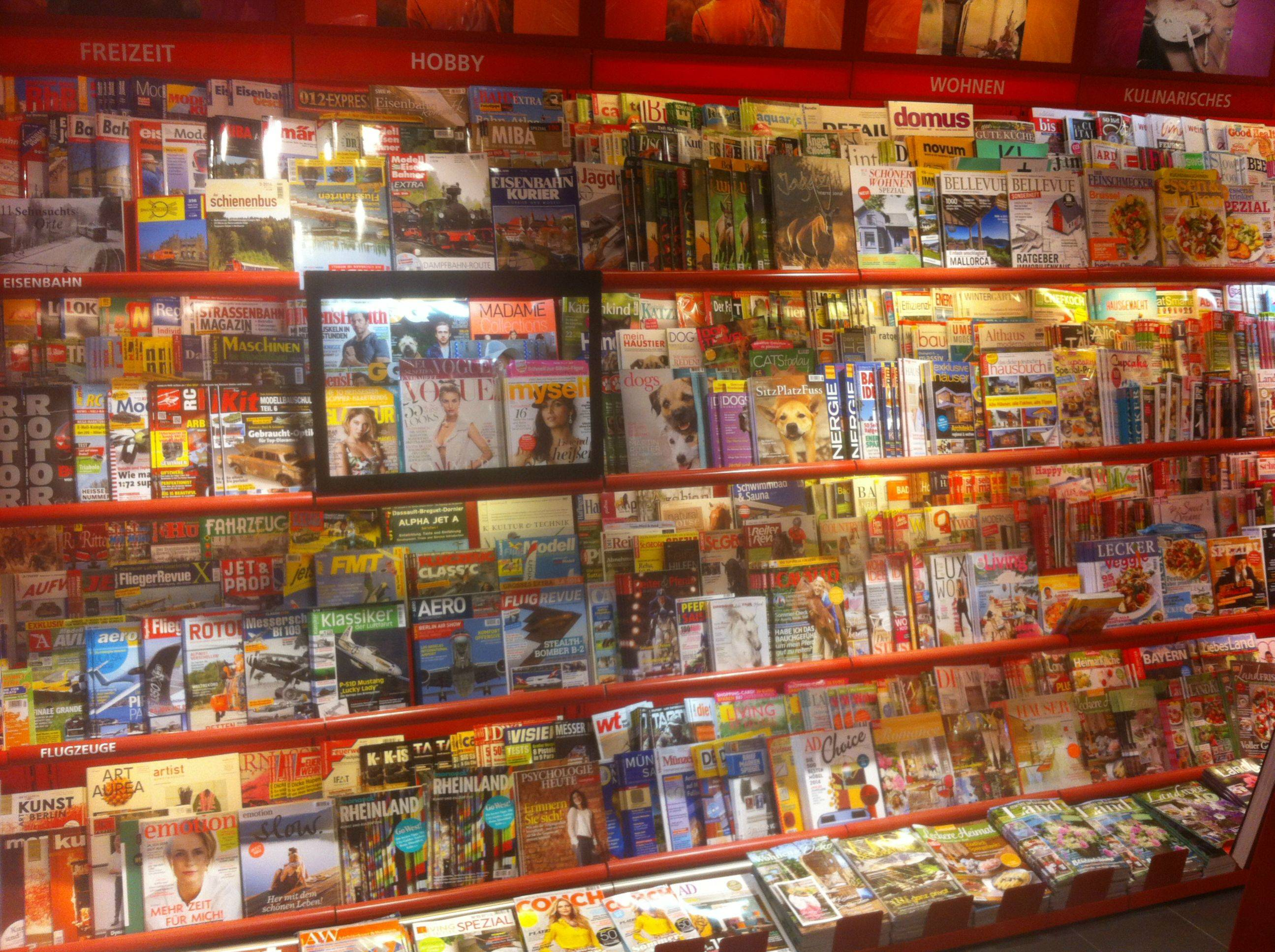
German print magazines

Print magazines can be distributed through the mail, through sales by newsstands, bookstores, or other vendors, or through free distribution at selected pick-up locations, such as within libraries, near railway or bus stations. Electronic distribution methods can include social media, email, news aggregators, and visibility of a publication's website and search engine results. The traditional subscription business models for distribution fall into three main categories; Paid, Non-paid and Controlled.

=== Paid circulation ===
In this model, the magazine is sold to readers for a price, either on a per-issue basis or by subscription, where an annual fee or monthly price is paid and issues are sent by post to readers. Paid circulation allows for defined readership statistics.

=== Non-paid circulation ===
This means that there is no cover price and issues are given away, for example in street dispensers, on airlines, or included with other products or publications. Because this model involves giving issues away to unspecific populations, the statistics only entail the number of issues distributed, and not who reads them.

=== Controlled circulation ===
This is the model used by many trade magazines (industry-based periodicals) distributed only to qualifying readers, often for free and determined by some form of survey. Because of costs (e.g., printing and postage) associated with the medium of print, publishers may not distribute free copies to everyone who requests one (unqualified leads); instead, they operate under controlled circulation, deciding who may receive free subscriptions based on each person's qualification as a member of the trade (and likelihood of buying, for example, likelihood of having corporate purchasing authority, as determined by job title). This allows a high level of certainty that advertisements will be received by the advertiser's target audience, and it avoids wasted printing and distribution expenses. This latter model was widely used before the rise of the World Wide Web and is still employed by some titles. For example, in the United Kingdom, a number of computer-industry magazines use this model, including Computer Weekly and Computing, and in finance, Waters Magazine. For the global media industry, an example would be VideoAge International.

== History ==
Front cover of 1 October 1892 issue of The Illustrated London News

The earliest example of magazines was Erbauliche Monaths Unterredungen, a literary and philosophy magazine, which was launched in 1663 in Germany. The Gentleman's Magazine, first published in 1731 in London was the first general-interest magazine. Edward Cave, who edited The Gentleman's Magazine under the pen name "Sylvanus Urban", was the first to use the term "magazine", on the analogy of a military storehouse, the quote being: "a monthly collection, to treasure up as in a magazine". Founded by Herbert Ingram in 1842, The Illustrated London News was the first illustrated weekly news magazine.

=== Britain ===
The oldest consumer magazine still in print is The Scots Magazine, which was first published in 1739, though multiple changes in ownership and gaps in publication totalling over 90 years weaken that claim. Lloyd's List was founded in Edward Lloyd's England coffee shop in 1734; although its online platform is still updated daily, it has not been published as a printed magazine since 2013, when it ended print publication after 274 years.

=== France ===
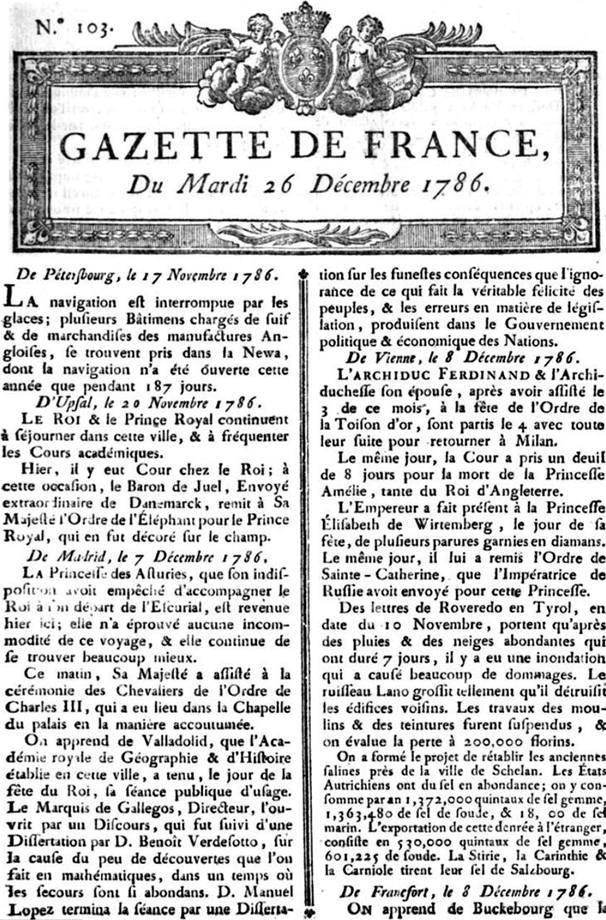
La Gazette, 26 December 1786

Under the Ancien Régime, the most prominent magazines were Mercure de France, Journal des sçavans, founded in 1665 for scientists, and Gazette de France, founded in 1631. Jean Loret was one of France's first journalists. He disseminated the weekly news of music, dance and Parisian society from 1650 until 1665 in verse, in what he called a gazette burlesque, assembled in three volumes of La Muse historique (1650, 1660, 1665). The French press lagged a generation behind the British, for they catered to the needs of the aristocracy, while the newer British counterparts were oriented toward the middle and working classes.

Periodicals were censored by the central government in Paris. They were not totally quiescent politically—often they criticized Church abuses and bureaucratic ineptitude. They supported the monarchy and they played at most a small role in stimulating the revolution. During the Revolution, new periodicals played central roles as propaganda organs for various factions. Jean-Paul Marat (1743–1793) was the most prominent editor. His L'Ami du peuple advocated vigorously for the rights of the lower classes against the enemies of the people Marat hated; it closed when he was assassinated. After 1800 Napoleon reimposed strict censorship.

Magazines flourished after Napoleon left in 1815. Most were based in Paris and most emphasized literature, poetry and stories. They served religious, cultural and political communities. In times of political crisis they expressed and helped shape the views of their readership and thereby were major elements in the changing political culture. For example, there were eight Catholic periodicals in 1830 in Paris. None were officially owned or sponsored by the Church and they reflected a range of opinion among educated Catholics about current issues, such as the 1830 July Revolution that overthrew the Bourbon monarchy. Several were strong supporters of the Bourbon kings, but all eight ultimately urged support for the new government, putting their appeals in terms of preserving civil order. They often discussed the relationship between church and state. Generally, they urged priests to focus on spiritual matters and not engage in politics. Historian M. Patricia Dougherty says this process created a distance between the Church and the new monarch and enabled Catholics to develop a new understanding of church-state relationships and the source of political authority.

=== Turkey ===
==== General ====
The Moniteur Ottoman was a gazette written in French and first published in 1831 on the order of Mahmud II. It was the first official gazette of the Ottoman Empire, edited by Alexandre Blacque at the expense of the Sublime Porte. Its name perhaps referred to the French newspaper Le Moniteur Universel. It was issued weekly. Takvim-i vekayi was published a few months later, intended as a translation of the Moniteur into Ottoman Turkish. After having been edited by former Consul for Denmark "M. Franceschi", and later on by "Hassuna de Ghiez", it was lastly edited by Lucien Rouet. However, facing the hostility of embassies, it was closed in the 1840s.

==== Satire ====
Satirical magazines of Turkey have a long tradition. One of the earliest satirical magazines was Diyojen which was launched in 1870. There are around 20 satirical magazines; the leading ones are Penguen (70,000 weekly circulation), LeMan (50,000) and Uykusuz. Historical examples include Oğuz Aral's magazine Gırgır (which reached a circulation of 750,000 in the 1970s) and Marko Paşa (launched in 1946). Others include L-Manyak and Lombak.

=== United States ===
==== Colonial America ====
Publishing was a very expensive industry in colonial times. Paper and printer's ink were taxed imported goods and their quality was inconsistent. Interstate tariffs and a poor road system hindered distribution, even on a regional scale. Many magazines were launched, most failing within a few editions, but publishers kept trying. Benjamin Franklin is said to have envisioned one of the first magazines of the American colonies in 1741, the General Magazine and Historical Chronicle. The Pennsylvania Magazine, edited by Thomas Paine, ran only for a short time but was a very influential publication during the Revolutionary War. The final issue containing the text of the Declaration of Independence was published in 1776.

==== Late 19th century ====
In the mid-19th century, monthly magazines gained popularity. They were general interest to begin, containing some news, vignettes, poems, history, political events, and social discussion. Unlike newspapers, they were more of a monthly record of current events along with entertaining stories, poems, and pictures. The first periodicals to branch out from news were Harper's and The Atlantic, which focused on fostering the arts. Both Harper's and The Atlantic persist to this day, with Harper's being a cultural magazine and The Atlantic focusing mainly on world events. Early publications of Harper's even held famous works such as early publications of Moby Dick or famous events such as the laying of the world's first transatlantic telegraph cable; however, the majority of early content was trickle down from British events.

The development of the magazines stimulated an increase in literary criticism and political debate, moving towards more opinionated pieces from the objective newspapers. The increased time between prints and the greater amount of space to write provided a forum for public arguments by scholars and critical observers.

The early periodical predecessors to magazines started to evolve to modern definition in the late 1800s. Works slowly became more specialized and the general discussion or cultural periodicals were forced to adapt to a consumer market which yearned for more localization of issues and events.

==== Progressive era: 1890s–1920s ====
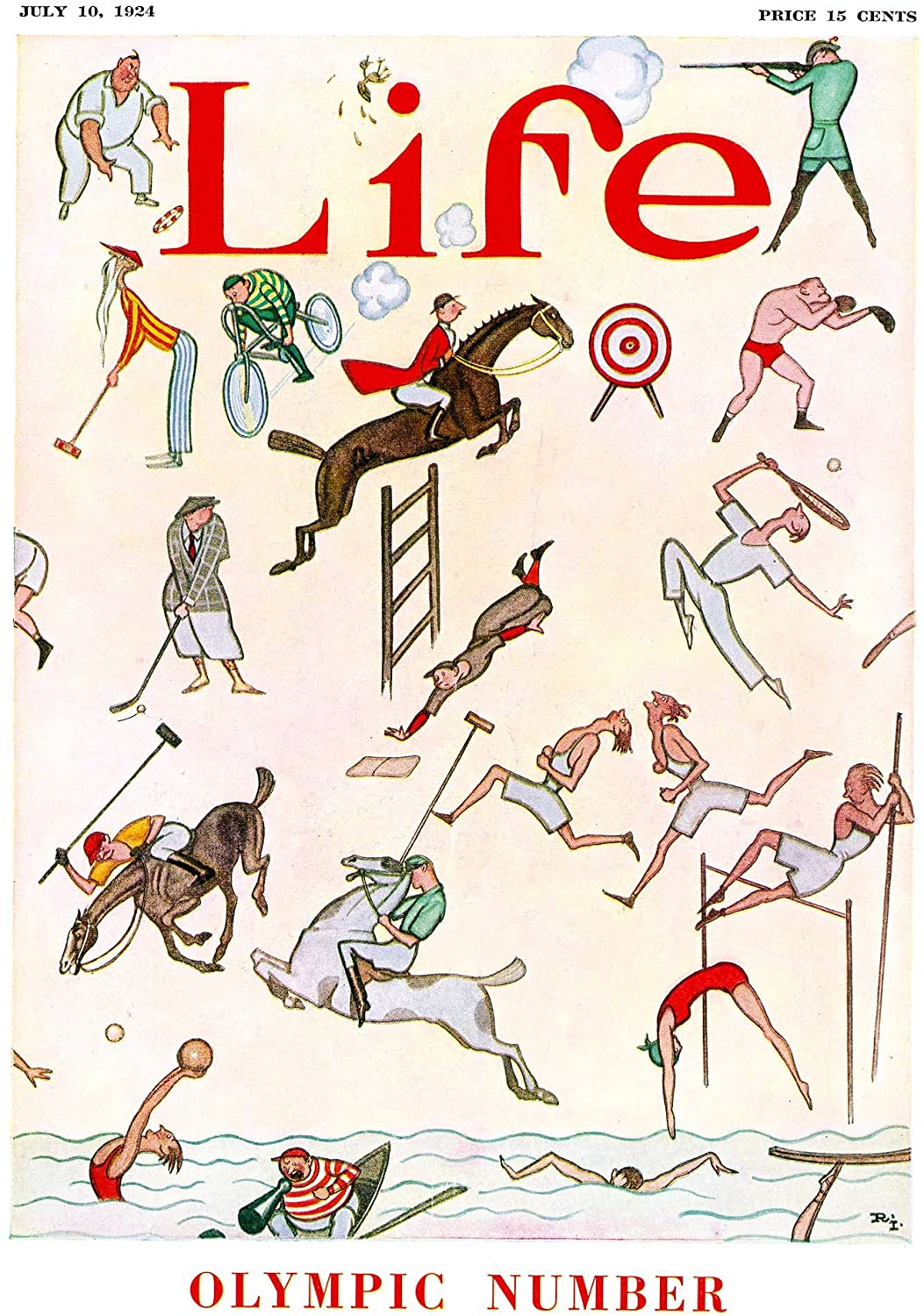
The Olympic Number of Life, 10 July 1924. Issues of general interest magazines focused on a specific subject were referred to as "numbers" and featured cover art relevant to the given topic, in this case the 1924 Summer Olympics.

Mass-circulation magazines became much more common after 1900, some with circulations in the hundreds of thousands of subscribers. Some passed the million-mark in the 1920s. It was an age of mass media. Because of the rapid expansion of national advertising, the cover price fell sharply to about 10 cents. One cause was the heavy coverage of corruption in politics, local government and big business, especially by Muckrakers. They were journalists who wrote for popular magazines to expose social and political sins and shortcomings. They relied on their own investigative journalism reporting; muckrakers often worked to expose social ills and corporate and political corruption. Muckraking magazines–notably McClure's–took on corporate monopolies and crooked political machines while raising public awareness of chronic urban poverty, unsafe working conditions, and social issues such as child labor.

The journalists who specialized in exposing waste, corruption, and scandal operated at the state and local level, like Ray Stannard Baker, George Creel, and Brand Whitlock. Others, including Lincoln Steffens, exposed political corruption in many large cities; Ida Tarbell went after John D. Rockefeller's Standard Oil Company. Samuel Hopkins Adams in 1905 showed the fraud involved in many patent medicines, Upton Sinclair's 1906 novel The Jungle gave a horrid portrayal of how meat was packed, and, also in 1906, David Graham Phillips unleashed a blistering indictment of the U.S. Senate. Roosevelt gave these journalists their nickname when he complained that they were not being helpful by raking up all the muck.

==== 1930s–1990s ====
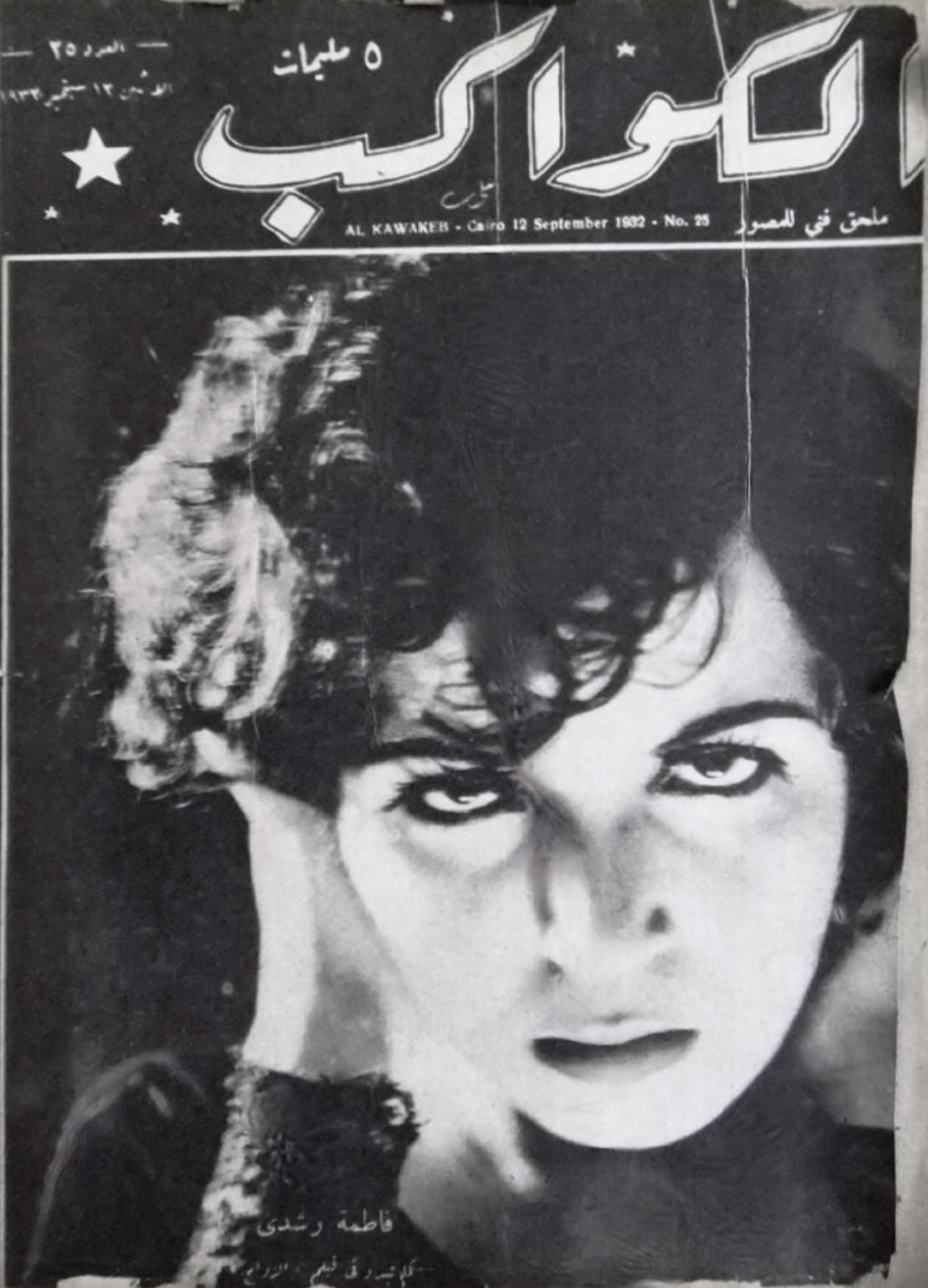
Actress Fatima Rushdi on the cover of Al-Kawakeb magazine, 12 September 1932

==== 21st century ====
Full scan of the January 2009 issue of State Magazine, published by the United States Department of State

According to the Research Department of Statista, closures of magazines outnumbered launches in North America during 2009. Although both figures declined during 2010–2015, launches outnumbered closures in each of those years, sometimes by a 3:1 ratio. Focusing more narrowly, MediaFinder.com found that 93 new magazines were launched during the first six months of 2014, while only 30 closed in that time frame. The category which produced the most new publications was "Regional interest", of which six new magazines were launched, including 12th & Broad and Craft Beer & Brewing. However, two magazines had to change their print schedules. Johnson Publishing's Jet stopped printing regular issues, making the transition to digital format, though still printing an annual print edition. Ladies' Home Journal stopped their monthly schedule and home delivery for subscribers to become a quarterly newsstand-only special interest publication.

According to statistics from the end of 2013, subscription levels for 22 of the top 25 magazines declined from 2012 to 2013, with just Time, Glamour and ESPN The Magazine gaining numbers. However, by 2024, some titles, notably outdoors magazines, appeared to be growing in popularity. Furthermore, recent research (2025) has shown that print magazines are seen as more trustworthy, with better quality journalism.

==== Women's magazines ====
The "seven sisters" of American women's magazines are Ladies' Home Journal, Good Housekeeping, McCall's, Woman's Day, Redbook, Family Circle, and Better Homes and Gardens. Some magazines, among them Godey's Lady's Book and Harper's Bazaar, were intended exclusively for a female audience, emphasizing the traditional gender roles of the 19th century. Harper's Bazaar was the first to focus exclusively on couture fashion, fashion accessories and textiles. The inclusion of didactic content about housekeeping may have increased the appeal of the magazine for a broader audience of women and men concerned about the frivolity of a fashion magazine.

== Types ==
There are many types of magazines. While some zero in on topics such as niche trade journals, cutting-edge research, or women's mags, others include topics like religion and pop culture. These may include deliciously satirical, dead serious, or a laugh-out-loud funny.

== Categories ==
=== Based on periodicity ===
Magazines are often categorised by their frequencies of publication (i.e., as weeklies, monthlies, quarterlies, etc.).

=== Based on target audience and subject ===
==== Women's fashion ====
The first women's magazine targeted toward wives and mothers was published in 1852. In the 1920s, new magazines appealed to young German women with a sensuous image and advertisements for the appropriate clothes and accessories they would want to purchase. The glossy pages of Die Dame and Das Blatt der Hausfrau displayed the "Neue Frauen", "New Girl" – what Americans called the flapper. This ideal young woman was chic, financially independent, and an eager consumer of the latest fashions. Magazines kept her up to date on fashion, arts, sports, and modern technology such as automobiles and telephones.

==== Parenting ====
Other women's magazines have influenced views of motherhood and child-rearing through the use of advice columns, advertisements, and articles related to parenting. Mass-marketed women's magazines have shaped and transformed cultural values related to parenting practices. As such, magazines targeting women and parenthood have exerted power and influence over ideas about motherhood and child-rearing.

==== Religion ====
Religious magazines have a long and varied history. In the United States, religious magazines are among the first magazines to appear, and their content helped shape the early Republic's literacy, morals, and political events. But during the past 150 years, their influence has lessened. See Christianity Today and The Tablet.

Interior design

Several interior design magazine publications also started out in the late 19th century, featuring the latest and greatest developments in the scene, showcasing beautiful, inspiring interiors and recording the changing trends and shifting demands of the public.

Some of the first few publications are Innen-Dekoration (founded in 1890), a monthly journal with well-illustrated articles on contemporary German and Austrian interiors and decorative art and Home Beautiful (founded in 1896), the oldest continually-published shelter magazine in the United States that shared the best of home inspiration and design education.

==== Celebrity gossip, human interest ====
Magazines publishing stories and photos of high-profile individuals and celebrities have long been a popular format in the United States. In 2019, People Magazine ranked second behind ESPN Magazine in total reach with a reported reach of 98.51 million.

==== Professional ====
An example of professional magazine is Broadcast, targeted towards readers in radio and television broadcast industry in United Kingdom

Professional magazines, also called trade magazines, or business-to-business magazines are targeted to readers employed in particular industries. These magazines typically cover industry trends and news of interest to professionals in the industry. Subscriptions often come with membership in a professional association. Professional magazines may derive revenue from advertisement placements or advertorials by companies selling products and services to a specific professional audience. Examples include Advertising Age, Automotive News, Broadcast, The Bookseller, and The Stage.

=== Based on tone or approach ===
Magazines can be categorised by their tone or approach, e.g., as with periodical works of satire or humor.

=== Puzzle magazines ===
Games World of Puzzles is an American games and puzzle magazine.

== Cover ==
Being on the cover of a magazine is sometimes considered an honor, or even historic; examples are one-time common statements to the effect that an individual had "appeared on the cover of Time" or of the Rolling Stone, etc.

The English Wikipedia presents a number of List-type articles that survey subjects and individuals appearing in the covers of specific magazines; see for example:

- List of stories on the cover of National Geographic;
- List of individuals on the cover of Rolling Stone;
- List of people/stories on the cover of Time magazine;
- List of individuals on the cover of U.S. Vogue.

== See also ==
- History of journalism
- Automobile magazines
- Boating magazines
- British boys' magazines
- Business magazines
- Computer magazines
- Customer magazines
- Fantasy fiction magazines
- Fashion journalism
- Horror fiction magazines
- Humor magazines
- Inflight magazines
- Lifestyle magazine
- Literary magazines
- Luxury magazines
- Music magazines
- News magazines
- Online magazines
- Pornographic magazines
- Pulp magazines
- Science fiction magazines
- Scientific journals
- Shelter magazines (home design and decorating)
- Sports magazines
- Sunday magazines
- Teen magazines
- Trade journals
- Video game magazine
- Video magazines
- Zines

=== Lists ===
- List of 18th-century British periodicals
- List of 19th-century British periodicals
- List of amateur radio magazines
- List of architecture magazines
- List of art magazines
- List of avant-garde magazines
- List of computer magazines
- List of environmental periodicals
- List of fashion magazines
- List of food and drink magazines
- List of gadget magazines
- List of health and fitness magazines
- List of horticultural magazines
- List of lesbian periodicals
- List of LGBT periodicals
- List of literary magazines
- List of magazines by circulation
- Lists of magazines by country
- List of manga magazines
- List of manga magazines published outside of Japan
- List of men's magazines
- List of music magazines
- List of online magazine archives
- List of political magazines
- List of pornographic magazines
- List of railroad-related periodicals
- List of satirical magazines
- List of science magazines
- List of travel magazines
- List of teen magazines
- List of video game magazines
- List of wildlife magazines
- List of women's magazines

=== Categories ===
- Periodicals
- Religious magazines
- Satirical magazines
- Wildlife magazines
