= Livability.com =

American demographics website

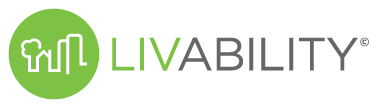
Livability.com's logo

Livability.com is a website that ranks the most livable small and mid-sized cities in the United States. The website includes demographic information, statistics, articles, photography and video that summarize the quality of life in cities, including information about schools, neighborhoods, local restaurants, and cultural events. The website's content is anchored by original photography shot by Journal Communications Inc. staff photographers. The site also provides moving tools and tips, do-it-yourself project help, and home and garden advice.

== Principals ==
Livability.com is owned and operated by Journal Communications, a Franklin, Tennessee-based publisher of over 100 custom magazines for chambers of commerce, economic development agencies and corporations, such as the Tennessee Farm Bureau Federation.

== Services ==
Livability.com publishes lists of small- to medium-sized U.S. cities, including "Best Affordable Places to Live," "Top 10 Best Places to Retire," and "10 Best Cities for Families."
