= List of gadget magazines =

This is a list of magazines writing about gadgets, consumer electronics and future technologies. The primary focus of the magazines in this list was to write about gadgets, for at least part of their run.

Name	Founded	Defunct	Country	Publisher	Topics
Stuff	1996		United Kingdom	Haymarket Media Group	Reviews of consumer electronics and previews of future technology
T3	1996		United Kingdom	Future plc	Technology magazine specialising in gadgets, gizmos, and other technology
TechRadar	2010		United Kingdom	Future plc	News and reviews of new technologies and technology products, especially cellphones
Wired	1993		United States	Condé Nast	Impact of emerging technologies on culture, economy and politics
CNET	1994		United States	CBS Interactive	Reviews, News, Articles, Blogs, Podcasts, and Videos
Engadget	2004		United States	AOL	Technology News and Reviews
