= Customer magazine =

Magazine produced by a business to its customers

A customer magazine is a magazine produced by a business as a means of communicating to its customers. It is a branch of custom media, a product that broadly shares the look and feel of a newsstand or consumer magazine but is paid for in part or whole by a business. Rather than copy sales and advertising, the primary goal of a customer magazine is to achieve a particular business objective. This could be for a firm to cross- or up-sell, change brand perception or engender loyalty. In-flight magazines, sponsored by airlines, were among the first customer magazines, and remain typical of the genre. In the UK, every supermarket chain now provides a customer magazine to promote its products through recipes and other food editorial. Many prominent digitally-native companies, like WebMD and Net-À-Portér, have released customer magazines of their own. Some customer magazines carry advertising; this is often seen as a useful way to offset the cost but equally can have some benefit in making the product look more like a regular magazine.

As a communications tool customer magazines are enormously powerful and allow firms to have a level of engagement with their customers that other media do not have. They are particularly good at conveying difficult and complex messages to an audience. They also lend themselves well to measurement and tracking, offering tangible information on return on investment and performances against objectives.
