= List of people on the United States cover of Rolling Stone (2010s) =

This is a list of people (real or fictional) appearing on the cover of Rolling Stone magazine in the 2010s. This list is for the biweekly and later, monthly issues of the magazine, including variant covers, and does not include special issues. Issue numbers that include a slash (XXX/YYY) are combined double issues.

== 2010 ==
Issue number	Cover date	People on cover	Notes
1096	January 21, 2010	None	Global warming cover story
1097	February 4, 2010	John Mayer	
1098	February 18, 2010	Lil Wayne	
1099	March 4, 2010	Jeff Beck, Eric Clapton	
1100	March 18, 2010	Shaun White	
1101	April 1, 2010	Jimi Hendrix	
1102	April 15, 2010	Glee cast (Dianna Agron, Jane Lynch, Lea Michele, Cory Monteith, Matthew Morrison)	
1103	April 29, 2010	The Black Eyed Peas (apl.de.ap, Fergie, Taboo, will.i.am)	
1104	May 13, 2010	Robert Downey Jr.	
1105	May 27, 2010	Mick Jagger	
1105	May 27, 2010	Keith Richards	
1106	June 10, 2010	Russell Brand	
1107	June 24, 2010	Jay-Z	
1108/1109	July 8–22, 2010	Lady Gaga	
1110	August 5, 2010	Leonardo DiCaprio	
1111	August 19, 2010	Katy Perry	
1112	September 2, 2010	True Blood cast (Stephen Moyer, Anna Paquin, Alexander Skarsgård)	
1113	September 16, 2010	Mad Men cast (Jon Hamm, Christina Hendricks, January Jones, Elisabeth Moss)	
1114	September 30, 2010	Roger Waters	
1115	October 14, 2010	Barack Obama	The Hot List 2010
1116	October 28, 2010	Keith Richards	
1117	November 11, 2010	Conan O'Brien	
1118	November 25, 2010	Eminem	
1119	December 9, 2010	None	Cover story on artists' playlists
1120/1121	December 23, 2010 – January 6, 2011	John Lennon	

== 2011 ==
Issue number	Cover date	People on cover	Notes
1122	January 20, 2011	Jimmy Fallon	
1123	February 3, 2011	Lil Wayne	
1124	February 17, 2011	Elton John	
1125	March 3, 2011	Justin Bieber	
1126	March 17, 2011	Snooki	
1127	March 31, 2011	Howard Stern	
1128	April 14, 2011	Rihanna	
1129	April 28, 2011	Adele	
1130	May 12, 2011	Steven Tyler	
1131	May 26, 2011	Bob Dylan	
1132	June 9, 2011	Lady Gaga	
1133	June 23, 2011	Zach Galifianakis	
1134/1135	July 7–21, 2011	Katy Perry (front cover), Dave Grohl (back cover)	
1136	August 4, 2011	Larry David	
1137	August 18, 2011	The Sheepdogs (Sam Corbett, Ewan Currie, Ryan Gullen, Leot Hanson)	Group was the winner of a Rolling Stone contest in which readers voted among several unsigned acts to appear on the cover
1138	September 1, 2011	Red Hot Chili Peppers (Flea, Anthony Kiedis, Josh Klinghoffer, Chad Smith)	
1139	September 15, 2011	George Harrison	
1140	September 29, 2011	Jon Stewart	
1141	October 13, 2011	Pink Floyd	Cover did not show the band members, only a take-off of the cover for their album The Dark Side of the Moon
1142	October 27, 2011	Steve Jobs	
1143	November 10, 2011	Eddie Murphy	The Hot List 2011
1144	November 24, 2011	George Clooney	
1145	December 8, 2011	Eric Clapton	"100 Greatest Guitarists of All Time" cover story
1145	December 8, 2011	Jimi Hendrix	"100 Greatest Guitarists of All Time" cover story
1145	December 8, 2011	Jimmy Page	"100 Greatest Guitarists of All Time" cover story
1145	December 8, 2011	Eddie Van Halen	"100 Greatest Guitarists of All Time" cover story
1146/1147	December 22, 2011 – January 5, 2012	People from covers of issues 1123, 1127, 1129–1136, 1139, 1140, 1143	2011 year-end issue

== 2012 ==
Issue number	Cover date	People on cover	Notes
1148	January 19, 2012	The Black Keys (Dan Auerbach, Patrick Carney)	
1149	February 2, 2012	David Bowie	
1150	February 16, 2012	The Voice cast (Christina Aguilera, Cee Lo Green, Adam Levine, Blake Shelton)	
1151	March 1, 2012	Paul McCartney	
1152	March 15, 2012	Whitney Houston	
1153	March 29, 2012	Bruce Springsteen	
1154	April 12, 2012	Jennifer Lawrence	
1155	April 26, 2012	Radiohead (Colin Greenwood, Jonny Greenwood, Ed O'Brien, Phil Selway, Thom Yorke)	
1156	May 10, 2012	Barack Obama	
1157	May 24, 2012	Peter Dinklage	
1158	June 7, 2012	Adam Yauch	
1159	June 21, 2012	Charlie Sheen	
1160/1161	July 5–19, 2012	deadmau5	
1162	August 2, 2012	Justin Bieber	
1163	August 16, 2012	Breaking Bad cast (Bryan Cranston, Aaron Paul)	
1164	August 30, 2012	Rick Ross	
1165	September 13, 2012	Mitt Romney	
1166	September 27, 2012	Bob Dylan	
1167	October 11, 2012	Adele (front cover), Amy Heidemann (back cover)	Heidemann appeared on the cover after her group Karmin won Rolling Stone's "Women Who Rock" cover contest
1168	October 25, 2012	Taylor Swift	The Hot List 2012
1169	November 8, 2012	Barack Obama	
1170	November 22, 2012	Daniel Craig (front cover), Pitbull (back cover)	
1171	December 6, 2012	Jimmy Page	
1172/1173	December 20, 2012 – January 3, 2013	Eminem	"The 50 Greatest Hip-Hop Songs of All Time" cover story
1172/1173	December 20, 2012 – January 3, 2013	Jay-Z	"The 50 Greatest Hip-Hop Songs of All Time" cover story
1172/1173	December 20, 2012 – January 3, 2013	The Notorious B.I.G.	"The 50 Greatest Hip-Hop Songs of All Time" cover story
1172/1173	December 20, 2012 – January 3, 2013	Tupac Shakur	"The 50 Greatest Hip-Hop Songs of All Time" cover story

== 2013 ==
Issue number	Cover date	People on cover	Notes
1174	January 17, 2013	Jimmy Kimmel	
1175	January 31, 2013	30 Rock cast (Alec Baldwin, Tina Fey, Tracy Morgan)	
1176	February 14, 2013	Rihanna	
1177	February 28, 2013	Lena Dunham	
1178	March 14, 2013	Billie Joe Armstrong	
1179	March 28, 2013	Mumford & Sons (Ted Dwane, Ben Lovett, Winston Marshall, Marcus Mumford)	
1180	April 11, 2013	Jon Hamm	
1181	April 25, 2013	Louis C.K.	
1182	May 9, 2013	Bruno Mars	
1183	May 23, 2013	The Rolling Stones (Mick Jagger, Keith Richards, Charlie Watts, Ron Wood)	
1184	June 6, 2013	Daft Punk (Thomas Bangalter, Guy-Manuel de Homem-Christo)	
1185	June 20, 2013	This Is the End cast (James Franco, Jonah Hill, Danny McBride, Seth Rogen)	
1186/1187	July 4–18, 2013	Johnny Depp	
1188	August 1, 2013	Dzhokhar Tsarnaev	
1189	August 15, 2013	Bruce Springsteen	Cover includes unidentified concertgoers
1190	August 29, 2013	Macklemore	
1191	September 12, 2013	Bob Dylan	
1192	September 26, 2013	Michael J. Fox	
1193	October 10, 2013	Miley Cyrus	The Hot List 2013
1194	October 24, 2013	Andrew Lincoln	
1195	November 7, 2013	Paul McCartney	
1196	November 21, 2013	Lou Reed (front cover), Naya Rivera (back cover)	
1197	December 5, 2013	Eminem	
1198/1199	December 19, 2013 – January 2, 2014	Will Ferrell	

== 2014 ==
Issue number	Cover date	People on cover	Notes
1200	January 16, 2014	The Beatles (George Harrison, John Lennon, Paul McCartney, Ringo Starr)	
1201	January 30, 2014	Lorde	
1202	February 13, 2014	Pope Francis	
1203	February 27, 2014	Philip Seymour Hoffman	Drake was originally planned to be on the cover, but was replaced by Hoffman after the latter's sudden death.
1204	March 13, 2014	Justin Bieber	
1205	March 27, 2014	Skrillex	
1206	April 10, 2014	KISS (Peter Criss, Ace Frehley, Gene Simmons, Paul Stanley)	
1207	April 24, 2014	Julia Louis-Dreyfus	
1208	May 8, 2014	Kit Harington	
1209	May 22, 2014	Neil Patrick Harris	
1210	June 5, 2014	Jack White	
1211	June 19, 2014	Eric Church	Country music issue
1211	June 19, 2014	Miranda Lambert	Country music issue
1212/1213	July 3–17, 2014	Melissa McCarthy	
1214	July 31, 2014	Lana Del Rey	
1215	August 14, 2014	Katy Perry	
1216	August 28, 2014	Willie Nelson	
1217	September 11, 2014	Robin Williams	
1218	September 25, 2014	Taylor Swift	
1219	October 9, 2014	John Oliver	
1220	October 23, 2014	Barack Obama	
1221	November 6, 2014	U2 (Bono, Adam Clayton, The Edge, Larry Mullen Jr.)	
1222	November 20, 2014	Bob Dylan	
1223	December 4, 2014	Dave Grohl	The Hot List 2014
1224/1225	December 18, 2014 – January 1, 2015	Seth Rogen	

== 2015 ==
Issue number	Cover date	People on cover	Notes
1226	January 15, 2015	Nicki Minaj	
1227	January 29, 2015	Stevie Nicks	
1228	February 12, 2015	Sam Smith	
1229	February 26, 2015	John Belushi	
1230	March 12, 2015	Madonna	
1231	March 26, 2015	Kendrick Lamar	Lamar appears with stylist Dianne Garcia
1232	April 9, 2015	Ringo Starr	
1233	April 23, 2015	Kurt Cobain	
1234	May 7, 2015	The Hulk	
1235	May 21, 2015	David Letterman	
1236	June 4, 2015	The Grateful Dead (Jerry Garcia, Mickey Hart, Bill Kreutzmann, Phil Lesh, Bob Weir)	
1237	June 18, 2015	Orange Is the New Black cast (Laura Prepon, Taylor Schilling)	
1238	July 2, 2015	Rush (Geddy Lee, Alex Lifeson, Neil Peart)	
1239/1240	July 16–30, 2015	Kim Kardashian	
1241	August 13, 2015	Kevin Hart	
1242	August 27, 2015	Dr. Dre, Ice Cube	
1243	September 10, 2015	Dez Bryant	NFL issue
1243	September 10, 2015	Andrew Luck	NFL issue
1243	September 10, 2015	Russell Wilson	NFL issue
1244	September 24, 2015	Donald Trump	
1245	October 8, 2015	Barack Obama	
1246	October 22, 2015	Keith Richards	
1247	November 5, 2015	The Weeknd	
1248	November 19, 2015	Adele	
1249	December 3, 2015	Bernie Sanders	The Hot List 2015
1250/1251	December 17–31, 2015	Star Wars: The Force Awakens cast (BB-8, John Boyega, Chewbacca, Harrison Ford, Daisy Ridley)	

== 2016 ==
Issue number	Cover date	People on cover	Notes
1252	January 14, 2016	5 Seconds of Summer (Michael Clifford, Luke Hemmings, Calum Hood, Ashton Irwin)	
1253	January 28, 2016	Leonardo DiCaprio	
1254	February 11, 2016	David Bowie	
1255	February 25, 2016	Chris Martin (Coldplay)	
1256	March 10, 2016	Ted Cruz, Marco Rubio, Donald Trump	
1257	March 24, 2016	Hillary Clinton, Bernie Sanders	
1258	April 7, 2016	James Franco	
1259	April 21, 2016	Ramones (Dee Dee Ramone, Joey Ramone, Johnny Ramone, Tommy Ramone)	
1260	May 5, 2016	Merle Haggard	
1261	May 19, 2016	Prince	
1262	June 2, 2016	Oscar Isaac	Isaac appears with his dog, Moby
1263	June 16, 2016	Lin-Manuel Miranda	
1264	July 1, 2016	Muhammad Ali	
1265/1266	July 14–28, 2016	Future	
1267	August 11, 2016	Jared Leto	
1268	August 25, 2016	Paul McCartney	
1269	September 8, 2016	James Corden	
1270	September 22, 2016	Green Day (Billie Joe Armstrong, Tré Cool, Mike Dirnt)	
1271	October 6, 2016	Uzo Aduba, Alan Alda, Jason Alexander, Gillian Anderson, Jennifer Aniston, Dan Aykroyd, Alec Baldwin, Lucille Ball, Beavis and Butt-head, John Belushi, Kyle Broflovski, Steve Carell, Johnny Carson, Eric Cartman, Kyle Chandler, Dave Chappelle, Chevy Chase, Emilia Clarke, John Cleese, Stephen Colbert, Courteney Cox, Bryan Cranston, Claire Danes, Larry David, Danny DeVito, Peter Dinklage, David Duchovny, Lena Dunham, Idris Elba, Peter Falk, Tina Fey, Dennis Franz, James Gandolfini, Sarah Michelle Gellar, Ricky Gervais, Ilana Glazer, Larry Hagman, Jon Hamm, Kit Harington, Sherman Hemsley, Christina Hendricks, Abbi Jacobson, Keegan-Michael Key, Jack Klugman, Lisa Kudrow, Matt LeBlanc, David Letterman, Andrew Lincoln, Louis C.K., Julia Louis-Dreyfus, Kyle MacLachlan, Stan Marsh, Danny McBride, Kenny McCormick, Mary Tyler Moore, Elisabeth Moss, Leonard Nimoy, Carroll O'Connor, Sarah Jessica Parker, Jordan Peele, Matthew Perry, Tony Randall, Norman Reedus, Isabel Sanford, Santa's Little Helper, David Schwimmer, Jerry Seinfeld, Rod Serling, Garry Shandling, William Shatner, Bart Simpson, Homer Simpson, Lisa Simpson, Maggie Simpson, Marge Simpson, John Slattery, Snowball II, Kevin Spacey, Jon Stewart, Kiefer Sutherland, Jeffrey Tambor, Jimmie Walker, Dominic West, Michael K. Williams, Henry Winkler	"The 100 Greatest TV Shows of All Time" cover story; cover includes unidentified walker from The Walking Dead
1272	October 20, 2016	Bruce Springsteen	
1273	November 3, 2016	Kevin Durant	
1274	November 17, 2016	Bruno Mars	The Hot List 2016
1275	December 1, 2016	The Rolling Stones (Mick Jagger, Keith Richards)	
1276/1277	December 15–29, 2016	Barack Obama	

== 2017 ==
Issue number	Cover date	People on cover	Notes
1278/1279	January 12–26, 2017	Emma Stone	
1280	February 9, 2017	Paris Jackson	
1281/1282	February 23 – March 9, 2017	John Oliver	
1283	March 23, 2017	Ed Sheeran	
1284	April 6, 2017	Donald Trump	
1285	April 20, 2017	Chuck Berry	
1286	May 4, 2017	Harry Styles	
1287	May 18, 2017	Chris Rock	
1288	June 1, 2017	Lorde	
1289	June 15, 2017	Thom Yorke	
1290	June 29, 2017	Rachel Maddow	
1291/1292	July 13–27, 2017	Emilia Clarke	
1293	August 10, 2017	Justin Trudeau	
1294	August 24, 2017	Kendrick Lamar	
1295	September 7, 2017	Gal Gadot	
1296	September 21, 2017	Dave Grohl	
1297	October 5, 2017	Donald Trump	
1298	October 19, 2017	Kesha	
1299	November 2, 2017	Tom Petty	
1300	November 16, 2017	Cardi B	The Hot List 2017
1301	November 30, 2017	Elon Musk	
1302/1303	December 14–28, 2017	Star Wars: The Last Jedi cast (Adam Driver, Mark Hamill, Daisy Ridley)	

== 2018 ==
Issue number	Cover date	People on cover	Notes
1304/1305	January 11–25, 2018	Bono	
1306/1307	February 8–22, 2018	Migos (Offset, Quavo, Takeoff)	
1308	March 8, 2018	Chadwick Boseman	
1309/1310	March 22 – April 5, 2018	Jack White	
1311/1312	April 19 – May 3, 2018	Dwayne Johnson	
1313/1314	May 17–30, 2018	Janelle Monáe	
1315/1316	June 14–28, 2018	Camila Cabello	
1317	July 2018	Cardi B, Offset	
1318	August 2018	Eric Church	
1319	September 2018	Stephen Colbert	
1320	October 2018	Aretha Franklin	
1321	November 2018	Zoë Kravitz	The Hot List 2018
1322	December 2018	Shawn Mendes	

== 2019 ==
Issue number	Cover date	People on cover	Notes
1323	January 2019	Travis Scott	
1324	February 2019	Jordan Peele	
1325	March 2019	Jahana Hayes, Alexandria Ocasio-Cortez, Ilhan Omar, Nancy Pelosi	"Women Shaping the Future" cover story
1326	April 2019	Game of Thrones cast (Sophie Turner, Maisie Williams)	
1327	May 2019	Willie Nelson	
1328	June 2019	Howard Stern	
1329	July 2019	Halsey	The Hot List 2019
1330	August 2019	Billie Eilish	
1331	September 2019	Harry Styles	
1332	October 2019	Taylor Swift	
1333	November 2019	Lana Del Rey, Elton John	"Musicians on Musicians" cover story
1334	December 2019	Adam Driver	

== Sources ==
- Rolling Stone Coverwall 1967–2013
- Rolling Stone: 50 Years of Covers: A History of the Most Influential Magazine in Pop Culture, New York, NY: Abrams, 2018. ISBN 978-1-4197-2902-7
