= Custom media =

Custom media (or, customer media) is a marketing term referring broadly to the development, production and delivery of media (print, digital, audio, video, events) designed to strengthen the relationship between the sponsor of the medium and the medium's audience. It is also called branded media, customer media, member media, content marketing, and custom publishing in the US; contract publishing and customer publishing in the UK. In-flight magazines, sponsored by airlines, were one of the first custom media and remain typical of the genre. While other channels have had significant success, the customer magazine is the most successful example of the genre.

Typically, custom media is sponsored by a single marketer (a company, brand, association or institution) and is designed to reach a tightly focused audience of customers, members, alumni or other constituency. Custom media can be produced "in-house" by such organizations. Over the past two decades, a growing number of specialized publishing and media firms have emerged, called "custom media" or "custom publishing" companies in the US, and "customer publishers'" or '"publishing agencies" in the UK. Like advertising policy other version and other marketing services firms, the companies or divisions of traditional media companies, provide professional marketing and communications services to clients for a fee. Such out-sourced services can be limited to design and editorial responsibilities or include the complete production and distribution process. In addition, many of the companies sell advertising space within custom publications to third parties; this subsidizes the cost of publication; creates a more authentic editorial environment; and allows third parties to purchase and publicizes an association with the media's sponsor, while reaching that sponsor's customers (e.g. food suppliers may purchase advertising space within a supermarket's custom media).

Custom media aims to build a relationship of trust and loyalty with the sponsor's customers, so they regard the sponsor as the vendor of choice when they make purchases. This is accomplished by providing information and, often, advice, that meets the needs and suits the preferences of the sponsor's target market. It serves the interests of the audience, rather than overtly plugging products and services the way ads do.

== See also ==
- Self-publishing
- Policy Other Version
