= The Big Word Project =

- The Big Word Project (as of April 8, 2008)
- Website type: Online Dictionary
- Owners: Paddy Donnelly and Lee Munroe
- Creators: Paddy Donnelly and Lee Munroe
- Website: thebigwordproject.com
- Launched: February 25, 2008

The Big Word Project was a website created by Paddy Donnelly and Lee Munroe, two Masters students from the University of Ulster, Belfast, Northern Ireland. Launched on February 25, 2008, the project was aimed at redefining the English dictionary with websites. Users could buy a word from a list of over 170,000 at $1 a letter and that word was then permanently linked to a URL of their choice.

In its first week, the project saw thousands of visitors and added more than 2,000 words, thanks largely to a glowing review by the popular blog Daring Fireball. But growth cooled; seven weeks after launch, the site stood at 2,345 words. However, an April 21 article in WIRED magazine renewed interest, and on May 22, the word count passed 5,000. As of 29 January 2010, the count was 7,025.

== Origin ==
The collaborative project was set up as part of Paddy and Lee’s Masters course in Multi-Disciplinary Design and drew upon Paddy’s viral marketing experience and Lee’s knowledge of Ruby on Rails applications and web usability. The creators, who are web designers, created a simplistic web 2.0-style website with few colours and no advertisements.

Paddy went on to research Viral Marketing, looking at how information is spread through word of mouth and the internet and how certain things can become phenomena overnight. Lee freelanced in web design and development for several years and is now concentrating his studies on web usability and web applications. The students wanted to create a mass collaboration project where a global movement could be made by combining a small effort from thousands of people and research what words mean to different people.

The project made use of a viral marketing campaign and relied on other people, primarily bloggers, spreading the word throughout the internet. The project has been featured in newspapers and magazines in Northern Ireland and beyond.

== Website ==
Once a word was purchased, that word was then 'redefined' on The Big Word Project, no longer having a traditional meaning but linking to a URL of the owners’ choice. The homepage consisted of a random selection of 100 bought words, and users could click a word to visit the new ‘definition’. Users could search for a word from the list of 170,000 or view them alphabetically. Since January 2010 there is a German version online Das grosse Wort Projekt for the German speaking area.

The site contained a blog following the creators’ studies, press for the project and interesting websites submitted to the project.

The money gained from the site went towards paying their student fees.
