= Gizmo =

A gizmo is a gadget, especially one whose real name is unknown or forgotten.

Gizmo may also refer to:

== Technology ==
- The Gizmo or "Gizmotron", an effects device for electric guitars
- Gizmo key, found on certain flutes
- Gizmos, interactive online simulations for math and science education from ExploreLearning
- Gizmo, a 1996-2001 digital game distribution platform by Mplayer.com
- Goodyear GA-400R Gizmo, a one-man helicopter introduced in 1954

== Entertainment ==
- The Gizmos, a 1970s proto-punk band
- Gizmo, a band formed in 2005 by Stewart Copeland
- "Gismo My Way", B-side to the 1974 single "The Wall Street Shuffle" by 10cc
- Gizmo!, a 1977 documentary film about inventions
- Gizmo, a 1999 play by Sir Alan Ayckbourn
- The Gizmo, a book series by Paul Jennings
- Gizmo (DC Comics), a character in the Teen Titans animated series
- Gizmo (Mirage Studios), a 1986 comic book series
- Gizmo Duck, a character in the DuckTales series
- Gizmo, a character in the Gremlins films
- Don Gizmo, a character in the Fallout computer game
- Gizmo, a character in the comic strip Beetle Bailey
- Professor Gizmo, a character in the TV cartoon The Ruff and Reddy Show
- A Super Mario Maker 2 category of objects
- War with the Gizmos, a 1958 novel by Murray Leinster
- Rasheed Rahal (codenamed Gizmo), an operator from Delta Force (2025 video game)

== Other uses ==
- Gizmo Williams (born 1962), former Canadian Football League player
- Gizmo (born 2025), a bald eagle offspring of Jackie and Shadow

== See also ==
- Gizmo5, a peer-to-peer internet telephony and instant messaging software application
- Gizmodo, a technology website
- Gizmondo, a handheld gaming console
- Gizmodgery, a 2000 album by pop rock band sElf
