= List of people on the United States cover of Rolling Stone (1980s) =

This is a list of people (real or fictional) appearing on the cover of Rolling Stone magazine in the 1980s. This list is for the regular biweekly issues of the magazine, including variant covers, and does not include special issues. Issue numbers that include a slash (XXX/YYY) are combined double issues.

== 1980 ==
Issue number	Cover date	People on cover	Notes
309	January 24, 1980	Walter Adams Jr., Peter Bowes, Connie Burns, Jacqueline Eckerle, David Heck, Teva Ladd, Karen Morrison, Stephan Preston, Phillip Snyder, Bryan Wagner, James Warmoth	The Who concert disaster cover story
310	February 7, 1980	Fleetwood Mac (Mick Fleetwood, Stevie Nicks)	
311	February 21, 1980	Tom Petty	
312	March 6, 1980	Richard Gere	
313	March 20, 1980	Bob Hope	
314	April 3, 1980	Linda Ronstadt	
315	April 17, 1980	The Clash (Mick Jones, Joe Strummer)	
316	May 1, 1980	Bob Seger	
317	May 15, 1980	Heart (Ann Wilson, Nancy Wilson)	
318	May 29, 1980	The Pretenders (Martin Chambers, Pete Farndon, James Honeyman-Scott, Chrissie Hynde)	
319	June 12, 1980	Ted Kennedy	
320	June 26, 1980	Pete Townshend	
321	July 10, 1980	John Travolta	
322	July 24, 1980	The Empire Strikes Back cast (Carrie Fisher, Harrison Ford, Mark Hamill, Billy Dee Williams)	
323	August 7, 1980	Jackson Browne	
324	August 21, 1980	The Rolling Stones (Mick Jagger, Keith Richards)	
325	September 4, 1980	Billy Joel	
326	September 18, 1980	Rodney Dangerfield	Dangerfield appears with unidentified baby
327	October 2, 1980	Robert Redford	
328	October 16, 1980	Pat Benatar, Neil Giraldo	
329	October 30, 1980	The Cars (Elliot Easton, Greg Hawkes, Ric Ocasek, Benjamin Orr, David Robinson)	
330	November 13, 1980	Mary Tyler Moore	
331	November 27, 1980	It's My Turn cast (Jill Clayburgh, Michael Douglas)	
332	December 11, 1980	Dolly Parton	
333/334	December 25, 1980 – January 8, 1981	None	1980 year-end issue

== 1981 ==
Issue number	Cover date	People on cover	Notes
335	January 22, 1981	John Lennon, Yoko Ono	Cover was ranked as the greatest magazine cover of the last 40 years by the American Society of Magazine Editors in 2005
336	February 5, 1981	Bruce Springsteen	
337	February 19, 1981	The Police (Stewart Copeland, Sting, Andy Summers)	
338	March 5, 1981	Goldie Hawn	
339	March 19, 1981	Warren Zevon	Cover includes unidentified hands grabbing Zevon's arms and legs
340	April 2, 1981	Roman Polanski	Cover includes illustration of Tess Durbeyfield
341	April 16, 1981	Jack Nicholson	
342	April 30, 1981	Ringo Starr	
343	May 14, 1981	John Lennon	"Inside the Gun Lobby" cover story
344	May 28, 1981	Susan Sarandon	
345	June 11, 1981	James Taylor	
346	June 25, 1981	Harrison Ford	
347	July 9, 1981	Margot Kidder	A picture of Christopher Reeve appears in the lower right corner
348	July 23, 1981	Tom Petty	
349	August 6, 1981	Rickie Lee Jones	
350	August 20, 1981	Bill Murray	John Irving appears in the banner in the lower right corner
351	September 3, 1981	Stevie Nicks	Nicks appears with her brother Chris' cockatoo, Maxwellington
352	September 17, 1981	Jim Morrison	
353	October 1, 1981	Yoko Ono	
354	October 15, 1981	Meryl Streep	
355	October 29, 1981	Elvis Presley	Presley appears with unidentified fan
356	November 12, 1981	Keith Richards	
357	November 26, 1981	William Hurt	
358	December 10, 1981	Carly Simon	Simon appears with her children, Ben Taylor and Sally Taylor
359/360	December 24, 1981 – January 7, 1982	The Rolling Stones (Mick Jagger, Keith Richards, Ian Stewart, Ron Wood, Bill Wyman)	Cover includes unidentified concertgoers

== 1982 ==
Issue number	Cover date	People on cover	Notes
361	January 21, 1982	John Belushi	
362	February 4, 1982	Timothy Hutton	
363	February 18, 1982	Steve Martin	
364	March 4, 1982	Peter Wolf	
365	March 18, 1982	Simon and Garfunkel (Art Garfunkel, Paul Simon)	
366	April 1, 1982	Warren Beatty	
367	April 15, 1982	Mariel Hemingway	
368	April 29, 1982	John Belushi	
369	May 13, 1982	Sissy Spacek	
370	May 27, 1982	Nastassja Kinski	
371	June 10, 1982	David Letterman	
372	June 24, 1982	Pete Townshend	
373	July 8, 1982	Sylvester Stallone	
374	July 22, 1982	E.T. the Extra-Terrestrial	
375	August 5, 1982	The Go-Go's (Charlotte Caffey, Belinda Carlisle, Gina Schock, Kathy Valentine, Jane Wiedlin)	
376	August 19, 1982	Jeff Bridges	
377	September 2, 1982	Elvis Costello	
378	September 16, 1982	Robin Williams	
379	September 30, 1982	Richard Gere	
380	October 14, 1982	John Lennon, Yoko Ono	
381	October 28, 1982	Billy Joel	
382	November 11, 1982	The Who (Roger Daltrey, John Entwistle, Kenney Jones, Pete Townshend)	
383	November 25, 1982	Matt Dillon	
384	December 9, 1982	Bette Midler	
385/386	December 23, 1982 – January 6, 1983	People from covers of issues 361-385/386	1982 year-end issue

== 1983 ==
Issue number	Cover date	People on cover	Notes
387	January 20, 1983	Paul Newman	
388	February 3, 1983	Dustin Hoffman	
389	February 17, 1983	Michael Jackson	
390	March 3, 1983	The Stray Cats (Slim Jim Phantom, Lee Rocker, Brian Setzer)	
391	March 17, 1983	Jessica Lange	
392	March 31, 1983	Dudley Moore	
393	April 14, 1983	Joan Baez	
394	April 28, 1983	Prince, Vanity	
395	May 12, 1983	David Bowie	
396	May 26, 1983	Sean Penn	
397	June 9, 1983	Christie Brinkley, Michael Ives	Cover story on health clubs
398	June 23, 1983	Men at Work (Greg Ham, Colin Hay)	
399	July 7, 1983	Eddie Murphy	
400/401	July 21 – August 4, 1983	Return of the Jedi cast (Carrie Fisher, Darth Vader)	Cover includes unidentified Ewok and Gamorrean
402	August 18, 1983	John Travolta	
403	September 1, 1983	Sting	
404	September 15, 1983	Jackson Browne	
405	September 29, 1983	Annie Lennox	
406	October 13, 1983	Chevy Chase	
407	October 27, 1983	Sean Connery	
408	November 10, 1983	Boy George	
409	November 24, 1983	Mick Jagger	
410	December 8, 1983	Michael Jackson, Paul McCartney	
411/412	December 22, 1983 – January 5, 1984	People from covers of issues 385/386-411/412	1983 year-end issue

== 1984 ==
Issue number	Cover date	People on cover	Notes
413	January 19, 1984	Jeff Beck, Eric Clapton, Joe Cocker, Kenney Jones, Ronnie Lane, Jimmy Page, Paul Rodgers, Charlie Watts, Bill Wyman	ARMS Charity Concerts cover story
414	February 2, 1984	Duran Duran (Simon Le Bon, Nick Rhodes, Andy Taylor, John Taylor, Roger Taylor)	
415	February 16, 1984	The Beatles (George Harrison, John Lennon, Paul McCartney, Ringo Starr)	
416	March 1, 1984	The Police (Stewart Copeland, Sting, Andy Summers)	
417	March 15, 1984	Michael Jackson	
418	March 29, 1984	Jack Nicholson	
419	April 12, 1984	Eddie Murphy	
420	April 26, 1984	Daryl Hannah	
420	April 26, 1984	The Pretenders (Martin Chambers, Malcolm Foster, Chrissie Hynde, Robbie McIntosh)	
421	May 10, 1984	Marvin Gaye	
422	May 24, 1984	Cyndi Lauper	
423	June 7, 1984	Culture Club (Boy George, Mikey Craig, Roy Hay, Jon Moss)	
424	June 21, 1984	Bob Dylan	
425	July 5, 1984	The Go-Go's (Charlotte Caffey, Belinda Carlisle, Gina Schock, Kathy Valentine, Jane Wiedlin)	
426/427	July 19 – August 2, 1984	Little Richard, Steven Spielberg, Tom Wolfe	Various cover stories
428	August 16, 1984	Bill Murray	
429	August 30, 1984	Prince	
430	September 13, 1984	Huey Lewis	
431	September 27, 1984	John Belushi	
432	October 11, 1984	Tina Turner	
433	October 25, 1984	David Bowie	
434	November 8, 1984	Steve Martin	
435	November 22, 1984	Madonna	
436	December 6, 1984	Bruce Springsteen	
437/438	December 20, 1984 – January 3, 1985	People from covers of issues 413-437/438	1984 year-end issue

== 1985 ==
Issue number	Cover date	People on cover	Notes
439	January 17, 1985	Hall & Oates (Daryl Hall, John Oates)	
440	January 31, 1985	Billy Idol	
441	February 14, 1985	Mick Jagger	
442	February 28, 1985	Bruce Springsteen	
443	March 14, 1985	U2 (Bono, Adam Clayton, The Edge, Larry Mullen Jr.)	
444	March 28, 1985	Miami Vice cast (Don Johnson, Philip Michael Thomas)	
445	April 11, 1985	David Lee Roth	
446	April 25, 1985	Richard Gere	
447	May 9, 1985	Desperately Seeking Susan cast (Rosanna Arquette, Madonna)	
448	May 23, 1985	Phil Collins	
449	June 6, 1985	Julian Lennon	
450	June 20, 1985	David Letterman	
451	July 4, 1985	Clint Eastwood	
452/453	July 18 – August 1, 1985	Perfect cast (Jamie Lee Curtis, John Travolta)	
454	August 15, 1985	Bryan Adams, Bono, David Bowie, Eric Clapton, Phil Collins, Bob Dylan, Bryan Ferry, Bob Geldof, Chrissie Hynde, Mick Jagger, Mark Knopfler, Madonna, Paul McCartney, Ric Ocasek, Robert Plant, Sade, Sting, John Taylor, Pete Townshend, Tina Turner	Live Aid cover story
455	August 29, 1985	Mad Max Beyond Thunderdome cast (Mel Gibson, Tina Turner)	
456	September 12, 1985	Prince	
457	September 26, 1985	Sting	
458	October 10, 1985	Bruce Springsteen	
459	October 24, 1985	Steven Spielberg	
460	November 7, 1985	Don Johnson	
461	November 21, 1985	Mark Knopfler	
462	December 5, 1985	Bob Geldof	
463/464	December 19, 1985 – January 2, 1986	People from covers of issues 437/438-463/464	1985 year-end issue

== 1986 ==
Issue number	Cover date	People on cover	Notes
465	January 16, 1986	Michael Douglas	
466	January 30, 1986	John Mellencamp	
467	February 13, 1986	Chuck Berry, James Brown, Ray Charles, Sam Cooke, Fats Domino, The Everly Brothers (Don Everly, Phil Everly), Buddy Holly, Jerry Lee Lewis, Little Richard, Elvis Presley	Rock and Roll Hall of Fame cover story
468	February 27, 1986	Bruce Springsteen	
469	March 13, 1986	Jim McMahon	
470	March 27, 1986	Bruce Willis	
471	April 10, 1986	Stevie Wonder	
472	April 24, 1986	Prince, Wendy & Lisa (Lisa Coleman, Wendy Melvoin)	
473	May 8, 1986	Whoopi Goldberg	
474	May 22, 1986	Michael J. Fox	The Hot List 1986
475	June 5, 1986	Madonna	
476	June 19, 1986	Tom Cruise	
477	July 3, 1986	Van Halen (Michael Anthony, Sammy Hagar, Alex Van Halen, Eddie Van Halen)	
478/479	July 17–31, 1986	Bob Dylan, Tom Petty	
480	August 14, 1986	Jack Nicholson	
481	August 28, 1986	Boy George	
482	September 11, 1986	Paul McCartney	
483	September 25, 1986	Don Johnson	
484	October 9, 1986	Cybill Shepherd	
485	October 23, 1986	Tina Turner	
486	November 6, 1986	Billy Joel	
487	November 20, 1986	Huey Lewis	
488	December 4, 1986	Run-D.M.C. (Darryl McDaniels, Jason Mizell, Joseph Simmons)	
489/490	December 18, 1986 – January 1, 1987	People from covers of issues 463/464-489/490	1986 year-end issue

== 1987 ==
Issue number	Cover date	People on cover	Notes
491	January 15, 1987	Talking Heads (David Byrne, Chris Frantz, Jerry Harrison, Tina Weymouth)	
492	January 29, 1987	Peter Gabriel	
493	February 12, 1987	Paul Reubens	
494	February 26, 1987	Bruce Springsteen	
495	March 12, 1987	Michael J. Fox	
496	March 26, 1987	The Bangles (Susanna Hoffs, Debbi Peterson, Vicki Peterson, Michael Steele)	
497	April 9, 1987	Woody Allen	
498	April 23, 1987	David Bowie	
499	May 7, 1987	U2 (Bono, Adam Clayton, The Edge, Larry Mullen Jr.)	
500	May 21, 1987	Jon Bon Jovi	The Hot List 1987
501	June 4, 1987	Jimi Hendrix	
502	June 18, 1987	Robert Cray	
503	July 2, 1987	Ladysmith Black Mambazo (Jabulani Dubazana, Abednego Mazibuko, Albert Mazibuko, Geophrey Mdletshe, Russel Mthembu, Inos Phungula, Ben Shabalala, Headman Shabalala, Jockey Shabalala, Joseph Shabalala), Paul Simon	
504/505	July 16–30, 1987	The Grateful Dead (Jerry Garcia, Mickey Hart, Bill Kreutzmann, Phil Lesh, Brent Mydland, Bob Weir)	
506	August 13, 1987	Mötley Crüe (Tommy Lee, Mick Mars, Vince Neil, Nikki Sixx)	
507	August 27, 1987	None	"The 100 Best Albums of the Last Twenty Years" cover story
508	September 10, 1987	Madonna	
509	September 24, 1987	Michael Jackson	
510	October 8, 1987	Bono	
511	October 22, 1987	George Harrison	
512	November 5 – December 10, 1987	None	20th anniversary issue
513	November 19, 1987	Pink Floyd	Cover did not show the band members, only an illustration of various icons associated with the band and its music
514	December 3, 1987	R.E.M. (Bill Berry, Peter Buck, Mike Mills, Michael Stipe)	
515/516	December 17–31, 1987	People from covers of issues 491-503, 504/505 (minus Hart, Lesh, and Mydland), 506-511, 513, 514	1987 year-end issue

== 1988 ==
Issue number	Cover date	People on cover	Notes
517	January 14, 1988	Michael Douglas	
518	January 28, 1988	George Michael	
519	February 11, 1988	Sting	
520	February 25, 1988	Robin Williams	
521	March 10, 1988	U2 (Bono, Adam Clayton, The Edge, Larry Mullen Jr.)	
522	March 24, 1988	Robert Plant	
523	April 7, 1988	Martin Luther King Jr.	
524	April 21, 1988	David Byrne	
525	May 5, 1988	Bruce Springsteen	
526	May 19, 1988	Lisa Bonet	The Hot List 1988
527	June 2, 1988	Neil Young	
528	June 16, 1988	Terence Trent D'Arby	
529	June 30, 1988	Tom Hanks	
530/531	July 14–28, 1988	Van Halen (Michael Anthony, Sammy Hagar, Alex Van Halen, Eddie Van Halen)	
532	August 11, 1988	Tom Cruise	
533	August 25, 1988	Eric Clapton	
534	September 8, 1988	None	"The 100 Best Singles of the Last Twenty-Five Years" cover story
535	September 22, 1988	Tracy Chapman	
536	October 6, 1988	Keith Richards	
537	October 20, 1988	John Lennon	
538	November 3, 1988	Johnny Carson, David Letterman	Comedy issue
539	November 17, 1988	Guns N' Roses (Steven Adler, Duff McKagan, Axl Rose, Slash, Izzy Stradlin)	
540	December 1, 1988	Steve Winwood	
541/542	December 15–29, 1988	People from covers of issues 517-522, 524-540	1988 year-end issue

== 1989 ==
Issue number	Cover date	People on cover	Notes
543	January 12, 1989	Mel Gibson	
544	January 26, 1989	Roy Orbison	
545	February 9, 1989	Jon Bon Jovi	
546	February 23, 1989	Sam Kinison	
547	March 9, 1989	Bono	
548	March 23, 1989	Madonna	
549	April 6, 1989	James Brown	
550	April 20, 1989	R.E.M. (Bill Berry, Peter Buck, Mike Mills, Michael Stipe)	
551	May 4, 1989	Lou Reed	
552	May 18, 1989	Uma Thurman	The Hot List 1989
553	June 1, 1989	Ghostbusters II cast (Dan Aykroyd, Ernie Hudson, Bill Murray, Harold Ramis, Sigourney Weaver)	
554	June 15, 1989	Paul McCartney	
555	June 29, 1989	Michael Keaton	
556/557	July 13–27, 1989	The Who (Roger Daltrey, John Entwistle, Pete Townshend)	
558	August 10, 1989	Axl Rose	
559	August 24, 1989	Eddie Murphy	
560	September 7, 1989	The Rolling Stones (Mick Jagger, Keith Richards)	
561	September 21, 1989	Madonna	
562	October 5, 1989	Roland Gift	
563	October 19, 1989	Andie MacDowell	
564	November 2, 1989	Arsenio Hall, Jay Leno	1989 comedy issue
565	November 16, 1989	None	"The 100 Greatest Albums of the '80s" cover story
566	November 30, 1989	Jerry Garcia	
567/568	December 14–28, 1989	People from covers of issues 543, 544, 546-566	1989 year-end issue

== Sources ==
- Rolling Stone Coverwall 1967-2013
- Rolling Stone: 1,000 Covers: A History of the Most Influential Magazine in Pop Culture, New York, NY: Abrams, 2006. ISBN 0-8109-5865-1
