= List of people on the United States cover of Rolling Stone (1970s) =

This is a list of people (real or fictional) appearing on the cover of Rolling Stone magazine in the 1970s. This list is for the regular biweekly issues of the magazine, including variant covers, and does not include special issues. Issue numbers that include a slash (XXX/YYY) are combined double issues.

== 1970 ==
Issue number	Cover date	People on cover	Notes
50	January 21, 1970	N/A	Altamont Free Concert cover story; cover includes unidentified concertgoers
51	February 7, 1970	John Lennon, Yoko Ono	
52	February 21, 1970	Creedence Clearwater Revival (Doug Clifford, Stu Cook, John Fogerty, Tom Fogerty)	
53	March 7, 1970	Zabriskie Point cast (Mark Frechette, Daria Halprin)	
54	March 19, 1970	Sly & the Family Stone (Greg Errico, Larry Graham, Jerry Martini, Cynthia Robinson, Freddie Stone, Rose Stone, Sly Stone)	
55	April 2, 1970	Abbie Hoffman	
56	April 16, 1970	Dennis Hopper	
57	April 30, 1970	Paul McCartney	
58	May 14, 1970	Captain Beefheart	
59	May 28, 1970	Little Richard	
60	June 11, 1970	N/A	"On America 1970" cover story; cover includes unidentified antiwar demonstrators
61	June 25, 1970	Charles Manson	
62	July 9, 1970	Van Morrison	
63	July 23, 1970	David Crosby	
64	August 6, 1970	Janis Joplin	
65	September 3, 1970	Performance cast (Mick Jagger, Anita Pallenberg)	
66	September 17, 1970	The Grateful Dead (Jerry Garcia, Mickey Hart, Bill Kreutzmann, Phil Lesh, Ron "Pigpen" McKernan, Bob Weir)	
67	October 1, 1970	The Rascals (Eddie Brigati, Felix Cavaliere, Gene Cornish, Dino Danelli)	
68	October 15, 1970	Jimi Hendrix	
69	October 29, 1970	Janis Joplin	
70	November 12, 1970	Grace Slick	
71	November 26, 1970	Meher Baba	
72	December 10, 1970	Leon Russell	
73	December 24, 1970	Rod Stewart	

== 1971 ==
Issue number	Cover date	People on cover	Notes
74	January 21, 1971	John Lennon	
75	February 4, 1971	John Lennon, Yoko Ono	
76	February 18, 1971	James Taylor	
77	March 4, 1971	Bob Dylan	
78	March 18, 1971	Muhammad Ali	
79	April 1, 1971	Nicholas Johnson	
80	April 15, 1971	Joe Dallesandro	Dallesandro appears with his son, Joseph Jr.
81	April 29, 1971	Michael Jackson	
82	May 13, 1971	Peter Fonda	
83	May 27, 1971	Country Joe McDonald, Robin Menken	
84	June 10, 1971	Elton John	
85	June 24, 1971	Tricia Nixon	Nixon appears with unidentified girl
86	July 8, 1971	Doug Sahm	
87	July 22, 1971	Ian Anderson	
88	August 5, 1971	Jim Morrison	
89	August 19, 1971	Keith Richards	
90	September 2, 1971	George Harrison	
91	September 16, 1971	The Incredible Hulk	
92	September 30, 1971	Jefferson Airplane (Jack Casady, Joey Covington, Papa John Creach, Paul Kantner, Jorma Kaukonen, Grace Slick)	
93	October 14, 1971	Ike & Tina Turner (Ike Turner, Tina Turner)	
94	October 28, 1971	The Beach Boys (Al Jardine, Bruce Johnston, Mike Love, Brian Wilson, Carl Wilson, Dennis Wilson)	
95	November 11, 1971	N/A	"Fear and Loathing in Las Vegas" cover story
96	November 25, 1971	N/A	"Fear and Loathing in Las Vegas, Part Two" cover story
97	December 9, 1971	Pete Townshend	
98	December 23, 1971	Mel Lyman	

== 1972 ==
Issue number	Cover date	People on cover	Notes
99	January 6, 1972	Cat Stevens	
100	January 20, 1972	Jerry Garcia	
101	February 3, 1972	The Grateful Dead (Jerry Garcia, Keith Godchaux, Bill Kreutzmann, Phil Lesh, Ron "Pigpen" McKernan, Bob Weir)	
102	February 17, 1972	Gerritt Van Raam	"Nark, a Tale of Terror" cover story
103	March 2, 1972	Bob Dylan	
104	March 16, 1972	Bob Dylan	
105	March 30, 1972	Alice Cooper	
106	April 13, 1972	N/A	Erotic massage cover story; cover includes unidentified man and woman
107	April 27, 1972	Marvin Gaye, Hubert Humphrey	Various cover stories; cover includes unidentified man at Dripping Springs Reunion festival
108	May 11, 1972	David Cassidy	
109	May 25, 1972	Jane Fonda	
110	June 8, 1972	George McGovern	
111	June 22, 1972	Van Morrison	
112	July 6, 1972	Mick Jagger	
113	July 20, 1972	Paul Simon	
114	August 3, 1972	Huey Newton	
115	August 17, 1972	George McGovern	
116	August 31, 1972	Randy Newman	
117	September 14, 1972	Three Dog Night (Michael Allsup, Jimmy Greenspoon, Danny Hutton, Chuck Negron, Joe Schermie, Floyd Sneed, Cory Wells)	
118	September 28, 1972	Richard Nixon	
119	October 12, 1972	Sally Struthers	
120	October 26, 1972	Jeff Beck	
121	November 9, 1972	David Bowie	
122	November 23, 1972	Joe Conforte	Conforte appears with unidentified women
123	December 7, 1972	Carlos Santana	
124	December 21, 1972	Keith Moon	

== 1973 ==
Issue number	Cover date	People on cover	Notes
125	January 4, 1973	Carly Simon, James Taylor	
126	January 18, 1973	N/A	Apollo 17 cover story
127	February 1, 1973	Diana Ross	
128	February 15, 1973	Bette Midler	
129	March 1, 1973	Mick Jagger	
130	March 15, 1973	Robert Mitchum	
131	March 29, 1973	Dr. Hook & The Medicine Show (Billy Francis, Dennis Locorriere, Ray Sawyer)	Appeared on the cover as "What's-Their-Names" (drawn caricatures, not photographed) after releasing the song "The Cover of the Rolling Stone"
132	April 12, 1973	Truman Capote	
133	April 26, 1973	Mark Spitz	
134	May 10, 1973	Alice Cooper	
135	May 24, 1973	Dirk Dickenson	"Death in the Wilderness" cover story
136	June 7, 1973	N/A	Jesus freaks cover story
137	June 21, 1973	Rod Stewart	
138	July 5, 1973	Paul Newman	
139	July 19, 1973	Tatum O'Neal	
140	August 2, 1973	Peter Wolf	
141	August 16, 1973	Elton John	
142	August 30, 1973	Dan Hicks	Hicks appears with unidentified woman
143	September 13, 1973	Sam Ervin	
144	September 27, 1973	Richard Nixon	
145	October 11, 1973	Art Garfunkel	
146	October 25, 1973	Gene Autry	
147	November 8, 1973	Daniel Ellsberg	
148	November 22, 1973	Jerry Garcia	
149	December 6, 1973	Gregg Allman	
150	December 20, 1973	Hugh Hefner	

== 1974 ==
Issue number	Cover date	People on cover	Notes
151	January 3, 1974	The Spirit of Ecstasy	"Funky Chic" cover story
152	January 17, 1974	Lady Liberty, Richard Nixon	
153	January 31, 1974	Linda McCartney, Paul McCartney	
154	February 14, 1974	Bob Dylan	
155	February 28, 1974	N/A	"Fear and Loathing at the Super Bowl" cover story
156	March 14, 1974	Bob Dylan	
157	March 28, 1974	Rick Springman	"The POW Who Laid Down His Gun" cover story
158	April 11, 1974	Marvin Gaye	
159	April 25, 1974	Kris Kristofferson	
160	May 9, 1974	John Paul Getty III	
161	May 23, 1974	Jackson Browne	Browne appears with his son, Ethan
162	June 6, 1974	Uncle Sam, Oliver "Daddy" Warbucks	Cover story on the economy of the United States; cover is a parody of The Sting movie poster
163	June 20, 1974	James Dean	
164	July 4, 1974	The Carpenters (Karen Carpenter, Richard Carpenter)	
165	July 18, 1974	Eric Clapton	
166	August 1, 1974	Maria Muldaur	
167	August 15, 1974	Steely Dan	Cover did not show the band members, only an illustration of a woman riding a silver vibrator in reference to the band's name
168	August 29, 1974	Crosby, Stills, Nash & Young (David Crosby, Graham Nash, Stephen Stills, Neil Young)	
169	September 12, 1974	Richard Nixon	
170	September 26, 1974	Tanya Tucker	
171	October 10, 1974	Richard Pryor, Lily Tomlin	
172	October 24, 1974	The Beatles (George Harrison, John Lennon, Paul McCartney, Ringo Starr)	
173	November 7, 1974	Evel Knievel	
174	November 21, 1974	Elton John	
175	December 5, 1974	Dustin Hoffman	
176	December 19, 1974	George Harrison	

== 1975 ==
Issue number	Cover date	People on cover	Notes
177	January 2, 1975	Suzi Quatro	
178	January 16, 1975	Gregg Allman	
179	January 30, 1975	Freddie Prinze	
180	February 13, 1975	Pan	Cover story on musical instruments
181	February 27, 1975	Loggins & Messina (Kenny Loggins, Jim Messina)	
182	March 13, 1975	Led Zeppelin (Jimmy Page, Robert Plant)	
183	March 27, 1975	Linda Ronstadt	
184	April 10, 1975	Roger Daltrey	
185	April 24, 1975	Peter Falk	
186	May 8, 1975	John Denver	
187	May 22, 1975	Carly Simon	
188	June 5, 1975	Phoebe Snow	
189	June 19, 1975	Stevie Wonder	
190	July 3, 1975	Labelle (Sarah Dash, Nona Hendryx, Patti LaBelle)	
191	July 17, 1975	The Rolling Stones (Mick Jagger, Keith Richards)	
192	July 31, 1975	Richard Dreyfuss	
193	August 14, 1975	Neil Young	
194	August 28, 1975	Doonesbury cast (MacArthur, Uncle Duke)	
195	September 11, 1975	Mick Jagger	
196	September 25, 1975	The Eagles (Don Felder, Glenn Frey, Don Henley, Bernie Leadon, Randy Meisner)	
197	October 9, 1975	Muhammad Ali	
198	October 23, 1975	Patty Hearst	
199	November 6, 1975	Britt Ekland, Rod Stewart	
200	November 20, 1975	Randolph Apperson Hearst	Patty Hearst appears in a background portrait
201	December 4, 1975	Jack Nicholson	
202	December 18, 1975	Bonnie Raitt	

== 1976 ==
Issue number	Cover date	People on cover	Notes
203	January 1, 1976	Jefferson Starship (Marty Balin, Paul Kantner, Grace Slick)	
204	January 15, 1976	Joan Baez, Bob Dylan	
205	January 29, 1976	Pat Boone	
206	February 12, 1976	David Bowie	
207	February 26, 1976	John Cipollina, Jerry Garcia, Dan Hicks, Steve Miller, Grace Slick	San Francisco cover story
208	March 11, 1976	Donny Osmond	
209	March 25, 1976	Louise Lasser	
210	April 8, 1976	All the President's Men cast (Dustin Hoffman, Robert Redford)	
211	April 22, 1976	Peter Frampton	Frampton faces forward in cover photo
211	April 22, 1976	Peter Frampton	Frampton faces left in cover photo
212	May 6, 1976	Carlos Santana	
213	May 20, 1976	Marlon Brando	
214	June 3, 1976	Jimmy Carter	Cover illustration also includes Gregg Allman, Hubert Humphrey, Mr. Peanut, and Hunter S. Thompson
215	June 17, 1976	Linda McCartney, Paul McCartney	
216	July 1, 1976	Paul Simon	
217	July 15, 1976	The Beatles (George Harrison, John Lennon, Paul McCartney, Ringo Starr)	
218	July 29, 1976	John Gardner Ford	
219	August 12, 1976	Bob Marley	
220	August 26, 1976	Steven Tyler	
221	September 9, 1976	Doonesbury cast (Ginny Slade, Jimmy Thudpucker)	
222	September 23, 1976	Neil Diamond	
223	October 7, 1976	Elton John	
224	October 21, 1976	None	Cover story on Richard Avedon's portfolio "The Family 1976"
225	November 4, 1976	Brian Wilson	
226	November 18, 1976	Janis Joplin	
227	December 2, 1976	Linda Ronstadt	
228	December 16, 1976	Jackson Browne	
229	December 30, 1976	Moishe	

== 1977 ==
Issue number	Cover date	People on cover	Notes
230	January 13, 1977	Rod Stewart	
231	January 27, 1977	Jeff Bridges	
232	February 10, 1977	Peter Frampton	
233	February 24, 1977	Boz Scaggs	
234	March 10, 1977	Princess Caroline of Monaco	
235	March 24, 1977	Fleetwood Mac (Lindsey Buckingham, Mick Fleetwood, Christine McVie, John McVie, Stevie Nicks)	
236	April 7, 1977	Lily Tomlin	
237	April 21, 1977	Hall & Oates (Daryl Hall, John Oates)	
238	May 5, 1977	Mark Fidrych	
239	May 19, 1977	Hamilton Jordan, Joseph Lester Powell	
240	June 2, 1977	Crosby, Stills & Nash (David Crosby, Graham Nash, Stephen Stills)	
241	June 16, 1977	Robert De Niro	
242	June 30, 1977	Diane Keaton	
243	July 14, 1977	The Bee Gees (Barry Gibb, Maurice Gibb, Robin Gibb)	
244	July 28, 1977	Heart (Ann Wilson, Nancy Wilson)	
245	August 11, 1977	Diana Ross	
246	August 25, 1977	Star Wars cast (Chewbacca, Carrie Fisher, Harrison Ford, Mark Hamill)	
247	September 8, 1977	O. J. Simpson	
248	September 22, 1977	Elvis Presley	
249	October 6, 1977	Bella Abzug	
250	October 20, 1977	John Lydon	
251	November 3, 1977	Ron Wood	
252	November 17, 1977	Pete Townshend	
253	December 1, 1977	Steve Martin	
254	December 15, 1977	None	10th anniversary issue
255	December 29, 1977	Peter Asher, Linda Ronstadt, James Taylor	

== 1978 ==
Issue number	Cover date	People on cover	Notes
256	January 12, 1978	Fleetwood Mac (Lindsey Buckingham, Mick Fleetwood, Christine McVie, John McVie, Stevie Nicks)	
257	January 26, 1978	Bob Dylan	
258	February 9, 1978	Jimmy Thudpucker	
259	February 23, 1978	Rita Coolidge, Kris Kristofferson	
260	March 9, 1978	Jane Fonda	
261	March 23, 1978	Donna Summer	
262	April 6, 1978	Brooke Shields	
263	April 20, 1978	Sgt. Pepper's Lonely Hearts Club Band cast (The Bee Gees (Barry Gibb, Maurice Gibb, Robin Gibb), Peter Frampton)	
264	May 4, 1978	Muhammad Ali	
265	May 18, 1978	Jefferson Starship (Marty Balin, John Barbata, Craig Chaquiço, David Freiberg, Paul Kantner, Pete Sears, Grace Slick)	
266	June 1, 1978	Carly Simon	
267	June 15, 1978	John Travolta	
268	June 29, 1978	Mick Jagger	
269	July 13, 1978	Willie Nelson	
270	July 27, 1978	Patti Smith	
271	August 10, 1978	John Belushi	
272	August 24, 1978	Bruce Springsteen	
273	September 7, 1978	The Rolling Stones (Mick Jagger, Keith Richards)	
274	September 21, 1978	Gary Busey	
275	October 5, 1978	The Who (Roger Daltrey, John Entwistle, Keith Moon, Pete Townshend)	
276	October 19, 1978	Linda Ronstadt	
277	November 2, 1978	Gilda Radner	
278	November 16, 1978	Bob Dylan	
279	November 30, 1978	Steve Martin, Gilda Radner, Linda Ronstadt	
280	December 14, 1978	Kareem Abdul-Jabbar, Cheech & Chong (Tommy Chong, Cheech Marin)	
281/282	December 28, 1978 – January 11, 1979	Richard Dreyfuss	

== 1979 ==
Issue number	Cover date	People on cover	Notes
283	January 25, 1979	The Cars (Elliot Easton, Greg Hawkes, Ric Ocasek, Benjamin Orr, David Robinson)	
284	February 8, 1979	Neil Young	
285	February 22, 1979	The Blues Brothers (Dan Aykroyd, John Belushi)	
286	March 8, 1979	Ted Nugent	
287	March 22, 1979	Johnny Carson	
288	April 5, 1979	Michael Douglas	Douglas appears with his son, Cameron Douglas
289	April 19, 1979	Village People (Alex Briley, David Hodo, Glenn Hughes, Randy Jones, Felipe Rose, Victor Willis)	
290	May 3, 1979	Richard Pryor	
291	May 17, 1979	The Bee Gees (Barry Gibb, Maurice Gibb, Robin Gibb)	
292	May 31, 1979	Jon Voight	
293	June 14, 1979	Cheap Trick (Bun E. Carlos, Rick Nielsen, Tom Petersson, Robin Zander)	
294	June 28, 1979	Blondie (Clem Burke, Jimmy Destri, Nigel Harrison, Debbie Harry, Frank Infante, Chris Stein)	
295	July 12, 1979	Paul McCartney	
296	July 26, 1979	Joni Mitchell	
297	August 9, 1979	Rickie Lee Jones	
298	August 23, 1979	Robin Williams	
299	September 6, 1979	James Taylor	
300	September 20, 1979	The Doobie Brothers (Cornelius Bumpus, Keith Knudsen, Chet McCracken, Michael McDonald, John McFee, Tiran Porter, Patrick Simmons)	
301	October 4, 1979	Jimmy Buffett	
302	October 18, 1979	Sissy Spacek	
303	November 1, 1979	Martin Sheen	
304	November 15, 1979	Jackson Browne, John Hall, Graham Nash, Bonnie Raitt, Carly Simon, Bruce Springsteen, James Taylor	Musicians United for Safe Energy cover story
305	November 29, 1979	The Eagles (Don Felder, Glenn Frey, Don Henley, Timothy B. Schmit, Joe Walsh)	Don Novello appears as Father Guido Sarducci in the banner in the lower right corner
306	December 13, 1979	Bette Midler	
307/308	December 27, 1979 – January 10, 1980	None	1979 year-end issue

== Sources ==
- Rolling Stone Coverwall 1967-2013
- Rolling Stone: 1,000 Covers: A History of the Most Influential Magazine in Pop Culture, New York, NY: Abrams, 2006. ISBN 0-8109-5865-1
