= Widget =

Widget may refer to:

== Arts and media ==
- Widget (Marvel Comics), a comic book character, an alternate version of Shadowcat from the Days of Future Past timeline
- Widget (TV series) or Widget the World Watcher, a 1990s animated television series
  - Widget (video game), based on the TV series
- Widget, a character on the animated series Cyberchase
- The Widget, nickname of New York World Journal Tribune

== Technology ==
- Widget (beer), a device placed in cans and bottles of beer to aid in the generation of froth
- Software widget, a generic type of software application comprising portable code intended for one or more different software platforms
  - Widget (GUI), an element of interaction in a graphical user interface, such as a button or a scroll bar
  - Widget toolkit, a software library containing a collection of GUI widgets that collaborate when used in the construction of applications
  - Web widget, an applet intended to be used within web pages
- E-9A Widget, a turboprop airliner
- Widget drive, a hard drive used only in the Apple Lisa computer system

== Other uses ==
- Widget (economics), a placeholder name for an unnamed, unspecified, or hypothetical manufactured good or product

== See also ==
- Widget Workshop, a science-based computer game developed by Maxis
- The MediaWiki Widgets extension
