= List of people on the United States cover of Rolling Stone (2000s) =

This is a list of people (real or fictional) appearing on the cover of Rolling Stone magazine in the 2000s. This list is for the regular biweekly issues of the magazine, including variant covers, and does not include special issues. Issue numbers that include a slash (XXX/YYY) are combined double issues.

== 2000 ==
Issue number	Cover date	People on cover	Notes
832	January 20, 2000	Backstreet Boys (Nick Carter, Howie Dorough, Brian Littrell, AJ McLean, Kevin Richardson)	
833	February 3, 2000	David Crosby, Jan Crosby, Bailey Jean Cypher, Beckett Cypher, Julie Cypher, Melissa Etheridge	
834	February 17, 2000	Mariah Carey	
835	March 2, 2000	Leonardo DiCaprio	
836	March 16, 2000	Carlos Santana	
837	March 30, 2000	'N Sync (Lance Bass, JC Chasez, Joey Fatone, Chris Kirkpatrick, Justin Timberlake)	
838	April 13, 2000	DMX	
839	April 27, 2000	Red Hot Chili Peppers (Flea, John Frusciante, Anthony Kiedis, Chad Smith)	
840	May 11, 2000	Sarah Michelle Gellar	
841	May 25, 2000	Britney Spears	
842	June 8, 2000	Tom Green	Green appears with unidentified baby
843	June 22, 2000	Kid Rock	
844/845	July 6–20, 2000	Christina Aguilera	
846	August 3, 2000	Blink-182 (Travis Barker, Tom DeLonge, Mark Hoppus)	
847	August 17, 2000	Dr. Dre, Eminem, Macy Gray, James Hetfield, Kid Rock, Anthony Kiedis, Dave Matthews, Ozzy Osbourne, Britney Spears, Bruce Springsteen, Mick Thomson, Eddie Vedder	Live music cover story
848	August 31, 2000	Keanu Reeves	
849	September 14, 2000	Gisele Bündchen	The Hot List 2000
850	September 28, 2000	Madonna	
851	October 12, 2000	Kate Hudson	
852	October 26, 2000	Jakob Dylan	
853	November 9, 2000	Al Gore	
854	November 23, 2000	Drew Barrymore	
855	December 7, 2000	The Beatles (John Lennon, Paul McCartney), Eminem, Madonna, Prince, The Rolling Stones (Mick Jagger, Keith Richards), Britney Spears	"Pop 100! The 100 Greatest Pop Songs" cover story
856/857	December 14–21, 2000	Backstreet Boys (Nick Carter, Howie Dorough, Brian Littrell, AJ McLean, Kevin Richardson)	
858/859	December 28, 2000 – January 4, 2001	People from covers of issues 832, 833 (minus Jan Crosby), 834–846, 848-854	2000 year-end issue

== 2001 ==
Issue number	Cover date	People on cover	Notes
860	January 18, 2001	U2 (Bono, Adam Clayton, The Edge, Larry Mullen Jr.)	
861	February 1, 2001	Johnny Knoxville	
862	February 15, 2001	Jennifer Lopez	
863	March 1, 2001	The Beatles (George Harrison, John Lennon, Paul McCartney, Ringo Starr)	
864	March 15, 2001	Dave Matthews Band (Carter Beauford, Stefan Lessard, Dave Matthews, LeRoi Moore, Boyd Tinsley)	
865	March 29, 2001	The Sopranos cast and crew (Lorraine Bracco, David Chase, Dominic Chianese, Drea de Matteo, Edie Falco, James Gandolfini, Robert Iler, Michael Imperioli, Joe Pantoliano, Jamie-Lynn Sigler, Tony Sirico, Aida Turturro, Steven Van Zandt)	
866	April 12, 2001	Julia Stiles	The Cool Issue
867	April 26, 2001	Aerosmith (Joe Perry, Steven Tyler)	
868	May 10, 2001	Pamela Anderson, Tommy Lee	
869	May 24, 2001	Destiny's Child (Beyoncé Knowles, Kelly Rowland, Michelle Williams)	
870	June 7, 2001	The Rock	
871	June 21, 2001	Bono, Eric Clapton, Destiny's Child (Beyoncé Knowles, Kelly Rowland, Michelle Williams), Nelly Furtado, Madonna, Dave Matthews, Moby, 'N Sync (Lance Bass, Joey Fatone, Chris Kirkpatrick, Justin Timberlake), Jim Root, Steven Tyler	Summer concerts cover story; Joe Perry can be seen behind Steven Tyler in his photo; JC Chasez is cut out of the 'N Sync photo
872	July 5, 2001	Angelina Jolie	
873	July 19, 2001	Staind (Johnny April, Aaron Lewis, Mike Mushok, Jon Wysocki)	
874	August 2, 2001	Radiohead (Colin Greenwood, Jonny Greenwood, Ed O'Brien, Phil Selway, Thom Yorke)	
875	August 16, 2001	Lance Bass	
875	August 16, 2001	JC Chasez	
875	August 16, 2001	Joey Fatone	
875	August 16, 2001	Chris Kirkpatrick	
875	August 16, 2001	Justin Timberlake	
875	August 16, 2001	'N Sync (Lance Bass, JC Chasez, Joey Fatone, Chris Kirkpatrick, Justin Timberlake)	
876	August 30, 2001	American Pie 2 cast (Shannon Elizabeth, Tara Reid, Mena Suvari)	The Hot List 2001
877	September 13, 2001	Britney Spears	
878	September 27, 2001	Jennifer Aniston	
879	October 11, 2001	Slipknot (Shawn Crahan, Chris Fehn, Paul Gray, Craig Jones, Joey Jordison, Jim Root, Corey Taylor, Mick Thomson, Sid Wilson)	
880	October 25, 2001	None	September 11 attacks cover story
881	November 8, 2001	Alicia Keys	
882	November 22, 2001	Bob Dylan	
883/884	December 6–13, 2001	Britney Spears	
885/886	December 27, 2001 – January 3, 2002	People from covers of issues 860, 862–870, 872–874, 875 ('N Sync cover), 876, 878-883/884	2001 year-end issue

== 2002 ==
Issue number	Cover date	People on cover	Notes
887	January 17, 2002	George Harrison	
888	January 31, 2002	No Doubt (Tom Dumont, Tony Kanal, Gwen Stefani, Adrian Young)	
889	February 14, 2002	Jennifer Garner	
890	February 28, 2002	Creed (Scott Phillips, Scott Stapp, Mark Tremonti)	
891	March 14, 2002	Linkin Park (Chester Bennington, Rob Bourdon, Brad Delson, Dave Farrell, Joe Hahn, Mike Shinoda)	
892	March 28, 2002	Smallville cast (Kristin Kreuk, Tom Welling)	
893	April 11, 2002	Shakira	The Cool Issue
894	April 25, 2002	The Sweetest Thing cast (Christina Applegate, Selma Blair, Cameron Diaz)	
895	May 9, 2002	The Osbournes cast (Jack Osbourne, Kelly Osbourne, Ozzy Osbourne, Sharon Osbourne)	
896	May 23, 2002	Kirsten Dunst	
897	June 6, 2002	Kurt Cobain	
898	June 20, 2002	Natalie Portman	
899/900	July 4–11, 2002	Eminem	
901	July 25, 2002	Ozzy Osbourne	
902	August 8, 2002	Dave Matthews Band (Carter Beauford, Stefan Lessard, Dave Matthews, LeRoi Moore, Boyd Tinsley)	
903	August 22, 2002	Bruce Springsteen	
904	September 5, 2002	Asia Argento	
905	September 19, 2002	The Vines (Ryan Griffiths, Patrick Matthews, Craig Nicholls, Hamish Rosser)	
906	October 3, 2002	Jennifer Love Hewitt	The Hot List 2002
907	October 17, 2002	Keith Richards	
908	October 31, 2002	Ashanti, Mary J. Blige, Avril Lavigne, Alanis Morissette, Shakira, Britney Spears	"Women in Rock" cover story
909	November 14, 2002	Christina Aguilera	
910	November 28, 2002	Bart Simpson	Cover is a parody of the Nevermind album cover
910	November 28, 2002	Homer Simpson	Cover is a parody of the Born in the U.S.A. album cover
910	November 28, 2002	The Simpsons cast (Bart Simpson, Homer Simpson, Lisa Simpson, Marge Simpson)	Cover is a parody of the Abbey Road album cover
911	December 12, 2002	Eminem	
912/913	December 26, 2002 – January 9, 2003	People from covers of issues 887, 888, 890, 893, 895–909, 910 (Bart Simpson cover), 911	2002 year-end issue

== 2003 ==
Issue number	Cover date	People on cover	Notes
914	January 23, 2003	Justin Timberlake	
915	February 6, 2003	Shania Twain	
916	February 20, 2003	The Beatles (George Harrison, John Lennon, Paul McCartney, Ringo Starr)	
917	March 6, 2003	Phish (Trey Anastasio, Jon Fishman, Mike Gordon, Page McConnell)	
918	March 20, 2003	Avril Lavigne	
919	April 3, 2003	50 Cent	
920	April 17, 2003	Lisa Marie Presley	The Cool Issue
921	May 1, 2003	Good Charlotte (Benji Madden, Joel Madden, Billy Martin, Paul Thomas)	
922	May 15, 2003	None	"American Icons" cover story
923	May 29, 2003	Ashton Kutcher	
924	June 12, 2003	Chester Bennington, Brody Dalle, Fred Durst, Perry Farrell, Dave Grohl, Davey Havok, James Hetfield, Josh Homme, Marilyn Manson, Dave Navarro, Ozzy Osbourne, Lars Ulrich	"Monsters of Summer" cover story
925	June 26, 2003	Christina Aguilera, Justin Timberlake	
926	July 10, 2003	Clay Aiken	
927	July 24, 2003	Eminem	
928	August 7, 2003	Angelina Jolie	
929	August 21, 2003	Ruben Studdard	
930	September 4, 2003	Ashley Olsen, Mary-Kate Olsen	
931	September 18, 2003	Jimi Hendrix	
932	October 2, 2003	Britney Spears	The Hot List 2003
933	October 16, 2003	Johnny Cash	
934	October 30, 2003	Missy Elliott, Eve, Alicia Keys	"Women Who Rock" cover story
935	November 13, 2003	The Strokes (Julian Casablancas, Nikolai Fraiture, Albert Hammond Jr., Fabrizio Moretti, Nick Valensi)	
936	November 27, 2003	Jessica Simpson	
937	December 11, 2003	None	"The 500 Greatest Albums of All Time" cover story
938/939	December 25, 2003 – January 8, 2004	Justin Timberlake	

== 2004 ==
Issue number	Cover date	People on cover	Notes
940	January 22, 2004	Dave Matthews	
941	February 5, 2004	Howard Dean	
942	February 19, 2004	The Beatles (George Harrison, John Lennon, Paul McCartney, Ringo Starr)	
943	March 4, 2004	Beyoncé Knowles	
944	March 18, 2004	Outkast (André 3000, Big Boi)	
945	April 1, 2004	Ben Affleck	
946	April 15, 2004	The Beatles (George Harrison, John Lennon, Paul McCartney, Ringo Starr), Chuck Berry, Bono, Kurt Cobain, Bob Dylan, Aretha Franklin, Jimi Hendrix, Janis Joplin, Elvis Presley, The Rolling Stones (Mick Jagger, Keith Richards)	"The Immortals: The Fifty Greatest Artists of All Time" cover story
947	April 29, 2004	Quentin Tarantino, Uma Thurman	
948	May 13, 2004	Usher	
949	May 27, 2004	Prince	
950	June 10, 2004	D12 (Bizarre, Eminem, Kon Artis, Kuniva, Swifty McVay, Proof)	
951	June 24, 2004	Bob Dylan, Eminem, Jimi Hendrix, Mick Jagger, John Lennon, Madonna, Bruce Springsteen	"50 Moments that Changed the History of Rock & Roll" cover story; Mitch Mitchell can be seen playing the drums in the Jimi Hendrix photo; cover includes unidentified concertgoers
952/953	July 8–22, 2004	Ray Charles	
954	August 5, 2004	B.D.	Cover includes unidentified Doonesbury characters
955	August 19, 2004	Lindsay Lohan	The Hot List 2004
956	September 2, 2004	Tom Cruise	
957	September 16, 2004	Michael Moore	
958	September 30, 2004	The Beatles (John Lennon, Paul McCartney), Kurt Cobain, Sean Combs, Jimi Hendrix, Janet Jackson, Madonna, Marilyn Manson, Dave Matthews, Jim Morrison, Elvis Presley, Red Hot Chili Peppers (Flea, John Frusciante, Anthony Kiedis, Chad Smith), Tupac Shakur, Britney Spears, Michael Stipe, Justin Timberlake, Pete Townshend, U2 (Bono, Adam Clayton, The Edge, Larry Mullen Jr.)	"The Photographs: The Fifty Greatest Portraits" cover story; René Elizondo Jr.'s hands appear in the Janet Jackson photo
959	October 14, 2004	Jackson Browne, Ben Gibbard, Stone Gossard, Martie Maguire, Dave Matthews, John Mellencamp, Mike Mills, Bonnie Raitt, Emily Robison, Patti Scialfa, Bruce Springsteen, Boyd Tinsley, Steven Van Zandt, Eddie Vedder	Vote for Change Tour cover story
960	October 28, 2004	Jon Stewart	
961	November 11, 2004	John Kerry	
962	November 25, 2004	Eminem	
963	December 9, 2004	None	"The 500 Greatest Songs of All Time" cover story
964/965	December 30, 2004 – January 13, 2005	U2 (Bono, Adam Clayton, The Edge, Larry Mullen Jr.)	

== 2005 ==
Issue number	Cover date	People on cover	Notes
966	January 27, 2005	Gwen Stefani	
967	February 10, 2005	Johnny Depp	
968	February 24, 2005	Green Day (Billie Joe Armstrong, Tré Cool, Mike Dirnt)	
969	March 10, 2005	Bob Marley	
970	March 24, 2005	Hunter S. Thompson	
971	April 7, 2005	Ethan Browne, James Garfunkel, Nona Gaye, Alexa Ray Joel, Sean Lennon, Aisha Morris, Kelly Osbourne, Otis Redding III, Alexandra Richards, Theodora Richards, Sebastian Robertson, Harper Simon, Chris Stills, Ben Taylor, Rufus Wainwright	"The Children of Rock" cover story
972	April 21, 2005	Eric Clapton, Elvis Costello, Eminem, Jerry Garcia, Joni Mitchell, Axl Rose, Tupac Shakur, James Taylor, Tina Turner, Frank Zappa	"The Immortals: The 100 Greatest Artists of All Time" cover story
973	May 5, 2005	Weezer (Brian Bell, Rivers Cuomo, Scott Shriner, Patrick Wilson)	
974	May 19, 2005	Orlando Bloom	
975	June 2, 2005	Darth Vader	
976	June 16, 2005	Dave Matthews Band (Carter Beauford, Stefan Lessard, Dave Matthews, LeRoi Moore, Boyd Tinsley)	
977/978	June 30 – July 14, 2005	Jessica Alba	
979	July 28, 2005	Wedding Crashers cast (Vince Vaughn, Owen Wilson)	
980	August 11, 2005	Jimi Hendrix	
981	August 25, 2005	Coldplay (Guy Berryman, Jonny Buckland, Will Champion, Chris Martin)	
982	September 8, 2005	The White Stripes (Jack White, Meg White)	
983	September 22, 2005	The Rolling Stones (Mick Jagger, Keith Richards, Charlie Watts, Ron Wood)	
984	October 6, 2005	Evangeline Lilly	The Hot List 2005
985	October 20, 2005	Paul McCartney	
986	November 3, 2005	Bono	
987	November 17, 2005	Billie Joe Armstrong	
988	December 1, 2005	Madonna	
989	December 15, 2005	Jay-Z	
990/991	December 29, 2005 – January 12, 2006	King Kong	

== 2006 ==
Issue number	Cover date	People on cover	Notes
992	January 26, 2006	Neil Young	
993	February 9, 2006	Kanye West	
994	February 23, 2006	Mariah Carey	
995	March 9, 2006	Shaun White	
996	March 23, 2006	Heath Ledger	
997	April 6, 2006	American Idol cast (Paula Abdul, Simon Cowell, Randy Jackson)	Cover includes a picture of Ryan Seacrest on a book cover
998	April 20, 2006	Kiefer Sutherland	
999	May 4, 2006	George W. Bush	
1000	May 18 – June 1, 2006	Muhammad Ali, Woody Allen, Pamela Anderson, Billie Joe Armstrong, John Belushi, Chuck Berry, Bono, David Bowie, Marlon Brando, James Brown, Jackson Browne, William S. Burroughs, David Byrne, Johnny Carson, Jimmy Carter, Johnny Cash, Ray Charles, Eric Clapton, Bill Clinton, George Clooney, Kurt Cobain, Sam Cooke, Francis Ford Coppola, Cindy Crawford, Walter Cronkite, Tom Cruise, James Dean, Johnny Depp, Bo Diddley, Bob Dylan, Clint Eastwood, Eminem, E.T. the Extra-Terrestrial, 50 Cent, Jane Fonda, Aretha Franklin, Jerry Garcia, Art Garfunkel, Marvin Gaye, Allen Ginsberg, Al Gore, Woody Guthrie, Zonker Harris, George Harrison, Debbie Harry, Topper Headon, Jimi Hendrix, Don Henley, James Hetfield, Albert Hofmann, Buddy Holly, Michael Jackson, Mick Jagger, Jam-Master Jay, Jay-Z, Billy Joel, Elton John, Angelina Jolie, Mick Jones, Janis Joplin, Michael Jordan, Diane Keaton, John F. Kennedy, Robert F. Kennedy, Jack Kerouac, Martin Luther King Jr., Timothy Leary, John Lennon, David Letterman, Little Richard, George Lucas, Madonna, Nelson Mandela, Marilyn Manson, Bob Marley, Paul McCartney, Kenny McCormick, Darryl "D.M.C." McDaniels, Freddie Mercury, Bette Midler, Joni Mitchell, Jim Morrison, Van Morrison, Eddie Murphy, Bill Murray, Mike Myers, Willie Nelson, Jack Nicholson, Stevie Nicks, Richard Nixon, Sinéad O'Connor, Yoko Ono, Roy Orbison, Ozzy Osbourne, Al Pacino, Tom Petty, Robert Plant, Elvis Presley, Prince, Richard Pryor, Joey Ramone, Ronald Reagan, Otis Redding, Lou Reed, Keith Richards, Robbie Robertson, Linda Ronstadt, Axl Rose, Diana Ross, Johnny Rotten, Arnold Schwarzenegger, Martin Scorsese, Pete Seeger, Jerry Seinfeld, Tupac Shakur, Joseph "Run" Simmons, Paul Simon, Paul Simonon, Bart Simpson, Patti Smith, Snoop Dogg, Britney Spears, Steven Spielberg, Bruce Springsteen, Ringo Starr, Gwen Stefani, Howard Stern, Jon Stewart, Rod Stewart, Sting, Michael Stipe, Joe Strummer, Quentin Tarantino, James Taylor, Hunter S. Thompson, Justin Timberlake, Pete Townshend, John Travolta, Tina Turner, Darth Vader, Eddie Vedder, Sid Vicious, Waldo, Andy Warhol, Muddy Waters, Robin Williams, Brian Wilson, Tom Wolfe, Stevie Wonder, Malcolm X, Angus Young, Neil Young, Frank Zappa	1000th issue; cover includes unidentified concertgoers
1002	June 15, 2006	Red Hot Chili Peppers (Flea, John Frusciante, Anthony Kiedis, Chad Smith)	
1003	June 29, 2006	Eddie Vedder	
1004/1005	July 13–27, 2006	Johnny Depp	
1006	August 10, 2006	Led Zeppelin (Jimmy Page, Robert Plant)	
1007	August 24, 2006	Christina Aguilera	
1008	September 7, 2006	Bob Dylan	
1009	September 21, 2006	Justin Timberlake	
1010	October 5, 2006	Jack Nicholson	
1011	October 19, 2006	Fergie	The Hot List 2006
1012	November 2, 2006	N/A	Cover story on the worst Congress ever
1013	November 16, 2006	Stephen Colbert, Jon Stewart	
1014	November 30, 2006	Sacha Baron Cohen	
1015	December 14, 2006	Snoop Dogg	
1016/1017	December 28, 2006 – January 11, 2007	People from covers of issues 992-1015	2006 year-end issue

== 2007 ==
Issue number	Cover date	People on cover	Notes
1018	January 25, 2007	James Brown	
1019	February 8, 2007	Panic! at the Disco (Ryan Ross, Spencer Smith, Brendon Urie, Jon Walker)	
1020	February 22, 2007	John Frusciante, John Mayer, Derek Trucks	"The New Guitar Gods" cover story
1021	March 8, 2007	Fall Out Boy (Andy Hurley, Patrick Stump, Joe Trohman, Pete Wentz)	
1022	March 22, 2007	South Park cast (Eric Cartman, Saddam Hussein)	Cover includes South Park version of the real Saddam Hussein's executioner
1023	April 5, 2007	Pink Floyd (David Gilmour, Nick Mason, Roger Waters, Richard Wright)	
1024	April 19, 2007	Grindhouse cast (Rosario Dawson, Rose McGowan)	
1025/1026	May 3–17, 2007	None	40th anniversary issue
1027	May 31, 2007	Johnny Depp, Keith Richards	
1028	June 14, 2007	Amy Winehouse	
1029	June 28, 2007	The Police (Stewart Copeland, Sting, Andy Summers)	
1030/1031	July 12–26, 2007	N/A	40th anniversary issue; cover includes unidentified concertgoers
1032	August 9, 2007	Guns N' Roses (Steven Adler, Duff McKagan, Axl Rose, Slash, Izzy Stradlin)	
1033	August 23, 2007	Zac Efron	
1034	September 6, 2007	Maroon 5 (Jesse Carmichael, Matt Flynn, Adam Levine, Mickey Madden, James Valentine)	
1035	September 20, 2007	50 Cent, Kanye West	
1036	October 4, 2007	Hunter S. Thompson	
1037	October 18, 2007	Kid Rock	Rock appears with models Krista Ayne, Nicole Herold, Alyssa Lipsky, and Maria Smith & The Hot List 2007
1038	November 1, 2007	Bruce Springsteen	
1039	November 15, 2007	None	40th anniversary issue
1040	November 29, 2007	Jay-Z	
1041	December 13, 2007	Led Zeppelin (John Paul Jones, Jimmy Page, Robert Plant)	
1042/1043	December 27, 2007 – January 10, 2008	People from covers of issues 1018, 1021, 1024, 1027–1029, 1033, 1035–1038, 1040	2007 year-end issue

== 2008 ==
Issue number	Cover date	People on cover	Notes
1044	January 24, 2008	Johnny Depp	
1045	February 7, 2008	Thom Yorke	
1046	February 21, 2008	Britney Spears	
1047	March 6, 2008	Jack Johnson	
1048	March 20, 2008	Barack Obama	
1049	April 3, 2008	Chris Rock	
1050	April 17, 2008	Mick Jagger, Keith Richards, Jack White	
1051	May 1, 2008	Bono, Chris Brown, Lil Wayne, Madonna, The Mars Volta (Cedric Bixler-Zavala, Omar Rodríguez-López), My Morning Jacket (Tom Blankenship, Jim James, Bo Koster), Conor Oberst, Robert Plant, Bruce Springsteen, Taylor Swift, Vampire Weekend (Chris Baio, Rostam Batmanglij, Ezra Koenig, Chris Tomson), Thom Yorke	"The Best of Rock 2008" cover story
1052	May 15, 2008	The Hills cast (Lauren Conrad, Heidi Montag, Audrina Patridge, Whitney Port)	
1053	May 29, 2008	The Eagles (Glenn Frey, Don Henley, Timothy B. Schmit, Joe Walsh)	
1054	June 12, 2008	Buddy Guy, Kirk Hammett, B. B. King, John Mayer, Jimmy Page, Omar Rodríguez-López, Carlos Santana, Eddie Van Halen	"100 Greatest Guitar Songs of All Time" cover story
1055	June 26, 2008	Chris Martin	
1056/1057	July 10–24, 2008	Barack Obama	
1058	August 7, 2008	Jonas Brothers (Joe Jonas, Kevin Jonas, Nick Jonas)	
1059	August 21, 2008	Robert Downey Jr.	
1060	September 4, 2008	George W. Bush	
1061	September 18, 2008	Billy Crystal, Larry David, Jimmy Fallon, Tina Fey, David Letterman, Tracy Morgan, Amy Poehler, Don Rickles, Chris Rock, Martin Short, Sarah Silverman, Robin Williams	Cover story on the new golden age of comedy
1062	October 2, 2008	Metallica (Kirk Hammett, James Hetfield, Robert Trujillo, Lars Ulrich)	
1063	October 16, 2008	John McCain	
1064	October 30, 2008	Barack Obama	Barack Obama was featured three times in seven months, a record equaled only by John Lennon
1065	November 13, 2008	AC/DC (Brian Johnson, Angus Young, Malcolm Young)	
1066	November 27, 2008	Bob Dylan	"The 100 Greatest Singers of All Time" cover story; the Presley cover includes unidentified background musicians
1066	November 27, 2008	Aretha Franklin	"The 100 Greatest Singers of All Time" cover story; the Presley cover includes unidentified background musicians
1066	November 27, 2008	John Lennon	"The 100 Greatest Singers of All Time" cover story; the Presley cover includes unidentified background musicians
1066	November 27, 2008	Elvis Presley	"The 100 Greatest Singers of All Time" cover story; the Presley cover includes unidentified background musicians
1067	December 11, 2008	Britney Spears	The Hot List 2008
1068/1069	December 25, 2008 – January 8, 2009	Brad Pitt	

== 2009 ==
Issue number	Cover date	People on cover	Notes
1070	January 22, 2009	George W. Bush	
1071	February 5, 2009	Bruce Springsteen	
1072	February 19, 2009	Sean Penn	
1073	March 5, 2009	Taylor Swift	
1074	March 19, 2009	U2 (Bono, Adam Clayton, The Edge, Larry Mullen Jr.)	
1075	April 2, 2009	Gossip Girl cast (Blake Lively, Leighton Meester)	
1076	April 16, 2009	Lil Wayne	
1077	April 30, 2009	Kings of Leon (Caleb Followill, Jared Followill, Matthew Followill, Nathan Followill)	
1078	May 14, 2009	Bob Dylan	
1079	May 28, 2009	Green Day (Billie Joe Armstrong, Tré Cool, Mike Dirnt)	
1080	June 11, 2009	Lady Gaga	The Hot List 2009
1081	June 25, 2009	Adam Lambert	
1082/1083	July 9–23, 2009	Jonas Brothers (Joe Jonas, Kevin Jonas, Nick Jonas)	
1084	August 6, 2009	Michael Jackson	
1085	August 20, 2009	Barack Obama	
1086	September 3, 2009	The Beatles (George Harrison, John Lennon, Paul McCartney, Ringo Starr)	
1087	September 17, 2009	Stephen Colbert	
1088	October 1, 2009	Megan Fox	
1089	October 15, 2009	U2 (Bono, The Edge)	
1090	October 29, 2009	Madonna	
1091	November 12, 2009	Shakira	
1092	November 26, 2009	Bono, Mick Jagger, Bruce Springsteen	Rock and Roll Hall of Fame 25th Anniversary Concerts cover story
1093	December 10, 2009	Taylor Lautner	
1094/1095	December 24, 2009 – January 7, 2010	None	"The Decade's Best Songs and Albums" cover story

== Sources ==
- Rolling Stone Coverwall 1967-2013
- Rolling Stone: 1,000 Covers: A History of the Most Influential Magazine in Pop Culture, New York, NY: Abrams, 2006. ISBN 0-8109-5865-1
- Rolling Stone: 50 Years of Covers: A History of the Most Influential Magazine in Pop Culture, New York, NY: Abrams, 2018. ISBN 978-1-4197-2902-7
