= Doonesbury (musical) =

1983 Broadway musical

- Original Broadway Playbill
- Music: Elizabeth Swados
- Lyrics: Garry Trudeau
- Book: Garry Trudeau
- Basis: Doonesbury series of comic strips by playwright
- Productions: 1983 Broadway

Doonesbury, also known as Doonesbury: A Musical Comedy, is a 1983 musical with a book and lyrics by Garry Trudeau and music by Elizabeth Swados.

Based on Trudeau's comic strip of the same name, it served to change the format of the strip from an episodic satire of college campus life that existed on a floating timeline to a more character driven, serialized political cartoon series in which characters changed, aged, and died, while still retaining a satirical political bent. Notably, the play depicts the core cast of characters—perpetually twenty-something undergraduates for the first twelve years of the strip's run—graduating college.

Trudeau took a nearly two-year sabbatical from writing the comic strip to develop the project.

== Synopsis ==
The play takes place over the course of two days, represented by two acts. During scene transitions, a backdrop of the White House descends in front of the stage and unseen voice actors engage in brief skits parodying the Reagan administration.

Act I

Reporter Roland Hedley travels to the fictional Walden College to profile a group of students in the graduating class of 1983, the members of "Walden Commune," an ersatz commune started by a diverse group of students in the 1970s: everyman Mike Doonesbury, jock B.D., campus radio host Mark Slackmeyer, stoner Zonker Harris, and B.D.'s ditzy girlfriend Boopsie ("Graduation"). Having spent the duration of college living together, the group are preparing to go their separate ways for the first time in years, with varying degrees of optimism towards their futures: B.D. has been drafted by the Dallas Cowboys professional football team; Mike is preparing to propose to his girlfriend, aspiring artist J.J., to whom he also plans to lose his virginity ("Just One Night"); Mark faces unemployment, as his job at the radio station ends with graduation; and Zonker, fearful of adult responsibility, escapes into fantasy and looks for excuses not to leave Walden ("I Came to Tan").

Meanwhile, Zonker's career criminal uncle, Duke, appears before a federal court after unknowingly selling cocaine to undercover FBI agents in a sting operation. Against the counsel of his henchwoman and sidekick Honey Huan, Duke represents himself, claiming he intended to use the profits for altruistic purposes ("Guilty").

Back at Walden, Mike and J.J. argue over the phone after she learns that he invited her estranged mother, attorney Joanie, to his graduation. Later, Joanie—who once lived at the commune as den mother—arrives with her son, Jeffrey, from her second marriage, reuniting with the Walden Commune group. Boopsie reveals her plans to become a Dallas Cowboys cheerleader so she can follow B.D. on the road ("I Can Have it All"), while Mark reveals Mike's proposal plans to the rest of the group.

Back at the courthouse, Duke is found guilty and sentenced to probation, with the additional requirement that he open and manage a drug rehabilitation center for the next five years.

J.J. arrives at Walden, only to discover that Mike has meticulously planned out every aspect of their weekend down to the minute. Joanie returns from grocery shopping and attempts to mediate the tensions between the two, which only leads to an argument between mother and daughter ("Get Together"). At the campus radio station, Hedley and Mark campaign on-air to get Mark hired by another radio station after he graduates ("Baby Boom Boogie Boy").

That night, the members of Walden, Joanie, and J.J. come together for their final meal together, which descends into a roast as they mock Mike's cooking ("Another Memorable Meal"). Zonker proposes that the group continue living together after graduation, only to realize everyone else is looking forward to moving on with their lives. As the evening ends, Duke blasts down the front door with a grenade launcher, announcing that he's purchased the commune to turn into a rehab center.

Act II

The next morning, the resident of the Commune awake to Duke bulldozing the meadow surrounding the building, and they engage in a debate with him about whether it's "just a house" ("Just a House"). Joanie intervenes, telling Duke that she'll represent the residents pro bono and will seek an injunction against him for redeveloping the house without a rezoning permit. A nonplussed Duke resumes bulldozing as Mike and Joanie leave for the courthouse.

Boopsie and B.D. attempt to discuss the future of their relationship when B.D. receives a call from his agent Sid Kibbitz, informing him that he's been traded to Tampa Bay in exchange for a tour bus. Crushed that he was valued so little by the team, B.D. leaves, prompting Honey and Boopsie to commiserate on their complicated relationships with men ("Complicated Man"). Outside, Zonker attempts to confront Duke, who informs his nephew that he plans to use the "drug rehab facility" as a front to turn the rest of the land around Walden into multimillion-dollar condos ("Real Estate (Mondo Condo)"). The gullible Zonker agrees to help Duke with his plan.

Mike and Joanie return from the courthouse, having successfully obtained an injunction against Duke. Joanie and J.J. reconcile their differences ("Mother"). Roland arrives with his news crew to conduct a final interview of the graduates, and informs Mark of a job offer from a radio station on Long Island. Roland and B.D. discuss their mutual admiration for Ronald Reagan's domestic policies ("It's The Right Time To Be Rich"); they are shortly thereafter joined by "Muffy and the Topsiders," a band made up of preppies ("Muffy and the Topsiders").

Duke, crushed after being presented with the injunction against him, takes a massive amount of hallucinogens and crashes his bulldozer through the commune. A stunned Mike blurts out his proposal to J.J., who accepts ("Just One Night (Reprise)"). Duke collapses as Honey admits she's worried about him.

As the play closes, Roland covers the graduation, and the various characters look forward to their futures ("Graduation (Reprise)").

== Song list ==
Act I

- Graduation
- Just One Night
- I Came To Tan
- Guilty
- I Can Have It All
- Get Together
- Baby Boom Boogie Boy
- Another Memorable Meal

Act II

- Just A House
- Complicated Man
- Real Estate (Mondo Condo)
- Mother
- It's The Right Time To Be Rich
- Muffy & The Topsiders
- Just One Night (Reprise)
- Graduation (Reprise)

== Production ==
After twenty previews, the musical, directed by Jacques Levy and choreographed by Margo Sappington, opened on Broadway at the Biltmore Theatre on November 21, 1983, where it ran for 104 performances.

=== Cast ===
- Mark Linn-Baker as Mark Slackmeyer
- Keith Szarabajka as B.D.
- Gary Beach as Uncle Duke
- Lauren Tom as Honey Huan
- Kate Burton as J.J. Caucus
- Barbara Andres as Joanie Caucus
- Reathel Bean as Roland Hedley
- Ralph Bruneau as Mike Doonesbury
- Albert Macklin as Zonker
- Laura Dean as Boopsie.

An original cast recording was released by MCA Records, and a companion book including song lyrics and production photos was published in conjunction with the opening.

== Awards and nominations ==
- Theatre World Award (Dean, winner)
- Grammy Award for Best Cast Show Album (nominee)
- Drama Desk Award for Outstanding Book (nominee)
- Drama Desk Award for Outstanding Lyrics (nominee)
- Drama Desk Award for Outstanding Featured Actress in a Musical (Dean, nominee)
- Drama Desk Award for Outstanding Director of a Musical (nominee)

== Critical reception ==
The musical received mixed reviews. Frank Rich of The New York Times wrote, "'Doonesbury' is a pleasant show. The surprise is that it's dull. A few bright interludes notwithstanding, this musical never catches fire. Some of the shortfall can be traced to conventional failings of craft in Mr. Trudeau's book and a weak score by Elizabeth Swados."

The Chicago Reader called the musical "pathetically tame and straight-faced. There is no point of view to the show, no commentary, no insight. There are just some very conventional songs and a series of subplots that do nothing but put the personalities from the comic strip on parade. In fact, the musical transforms those wonderful tools of expression into mere cartoon characters, as though their foibles and idiosyncrasies are what the comic strip is all about. The whole project resembles a franchise arrangement, the kind that permits Bert and Ernie and Cookie Monster and Big Bird to be plastered all over lunch boxes and sweatshirts."

== Spinoff ==
Trudeau and Swados would spin off the Reagan portions of the play into their show, Rap Master Ronnie, which premiered in 1984.
