= List of published collections of Doonesbury =

The first collections of Garry Trudeau's comic strip Doonesbury were published in the early 1970s by Holt, Rinehart and Winston. Regular collections of strips continue to the present day, and are currently published by Andrews McMeel Publishing.

== Regular collections ==
1. Still a Few Bugs in the System, 1972 (republished as Even Revolutionaries Like Chocolate Chip Cookies and Just a French Major from the Bronx, Popular Library, 1972), ISBN 0-03-091356-X
2. The President Is a Lot Smarter Than You Think, 1973 (republished as Don’t Ever Change, Boopsie, Popular Library, 1973), ISBN 0-03-091406-X
3. But This War Had Such Promise, 1973 (republished as Bravo for Life's Little Ironies and I Have No Son, Popular Library), ISBN 0-03-007521-1
4. Call Me When You Find America, 1973, ISBN 0-03-011031-9
5. Guilty, Guilty, Guilty!, 1974, ISBN 0-03-012511-1
6. "What Do We Have for the Witnesses, Johnnie?", 1975, ISBN 0-03-013176-6
7. Dare to Be Great, Ms. Caucus, 1975, ISBN 0-03-013866-3
8. Wouldn’t a Gremlin Have Been More Sensible?, 1975, ISBN 0-553-02733-6
9. "Speaking of Inalienable Rights, Amy...", 1976, ISBN 0-553-11805-6
10. You’re Never Too Old for Nuts and Berries, 1976, ISBN 0-03-018216-6
11. An Especially Tricky People, 1977, ISBN 0-03-020681-2
12. As the Kid Goes for Broke, 1977, ISBN 0-03-022681-3 (hardbound), ISBN 0-03-022676-7 (paperback)
13. Stalking the Perfect Tan, 1978, ISBN 0-03-042881-5 (hardbound), ISBN 0-03-042876-9 (paperback)
14. "Any Grooming Hints for Your Fans, Rollie?", 1978, ISBN 0-03-044861-1
15. "But the Pension Fund Was Just Sitting There", 1979, ISBN 0-03-049176-2
16. We’re Not Out of the Woods Yet, 1979, ISBN 0-03-049181-9
17. A Tad Overweight, But Violet Eyes to Die For, 1980, ISBN 0-03-049186-X.
18. And That's My Final Offer!, 1980, ISBN 0-03-049191-6
19. He's Never Heard of You, Either, 1981 (republished as Adjectives Will Cost You Extra and Gotta Run, My Government Is Collapsing, Fawcett, 1982), ISBN 0-03-049196-7
20. In Search of Reagan's Brain, 1981 (republished as Is This Your First Purge, Miss? and We Who Are About to Fry, Salute You, Fawcett, 1982), ISBN 0-03-059904-0 (hardcover), ISBN 0-03-059788-9 (paperback)
21. Ask for May, Settle for June, 1982 (republished as It's Supposed to Be Yellow, Pinhead and Do All Birders Have Bedroom Eyes, Dear?, Fawcett, 1983), ISBN 0-03-061532-1 (hardbound), ISBN 0-03-061522-4 (paperback)
22. Unfortunately, She Was Also Wired for Sound, 1982 (republished as The Thrill Is Gone, Bernie and Guess Who, Fish Face, Fawcett, 1983), ISBN 0-03-061731-6
23. The Wreck of the "Rusty Nail", 1983 (republished as A Farewell to Alms and Sir, I’m Worried About Your Mood Swings, Fawcett, 1984), ISBN 0-03-061732-4
24. You Give Great Meeting, Sid, 1983 (republished as Dressed for Failure, I See and Confirmed Bachelors Are Just So Fascinating, Fawcett, 1984), ISBN 0-03-061733-2
25. Check Your Egos at the Door, Owl Books, Henry Holt and Company, New York. 1985 ISBN 0-03-005627-6
26. That's Doctor Sinatra, You Little Bimbo!, 1986, ISBN 0-03-008537-3
27. Death of a Party Animal, 1986, ISBN 0-8050-0073-9
28. Downtown Doonesbury, Owl Books, Henry Holt and Company, New York. 1987. ISBN 0-8050-0354-1
29. Calling Dr. Whoopee, Owl Books, Henry Holt and Company, New York. 1988. ISBN 0-8050-0642-7
30. Talkin’ About My G-G-Generation, 1988, ISBN 0-8050-0791-1
31. We’re Eating More Beets!, Owl Books, Henry Holt and Company, New York. 1988. ISBN 0-8050-0932-9
32. Read My Lips, Make My Day, Eat Quiche and Die!, Andrews McMeel, 1989. ISBN 0-8362-1845-0
33. Give Those Nymphs Some Hooters!, Andrews McMeel, 1989. ISBN 0-8362-1858-2
34. You’re Smokin’ Now, Mr. Butts!, Andrews McMeel, 1990. ISBN 0-8362-1814-0
35. I’d Go With the Helmet, Ray, Andrews McMeel, 1991. ISBN 0-8362-1870-1
36. Welcome to Club Scud!, Andrews McMeel, 1991. ISBN 0-8362-1882-5
37. What Is It Tink, Is Pan in Trouble?, 1992. ISBN 978-0836218862
38. Quality Time on Highway 1, Andrews McMeel, 1993. ISBN 0-8362-1712-8
39. Washed Out Bridges and Other Disasters, Andrews McMeel, 1994. ISBN 0-8362-1747-0
40. In Search of Cigarette Holder Man, Andrews McMeel, 1994. ISBN 0-8362-1767-5
41. Doonesbury Nation, Andrews McMeel, 1995. ISBN 0-8362-1784-5
42. Virtual Doonesbury, Andrews McMeel, 1996. ISBN 0-8362-1032-8
43. Planet Doonesbury, Andrews McMeel, 1997. ISBN 0-8362-3686-6
44. Buck Wild Doonesbury, Andrews McMeel, 1999. ISBN 0-7407-0015-4
45. Duke 2000: Whatever it Takes, 2000. ISBN 978-0740706073
46. The Revolt of the English Majors, 2001. ISBN 978-0740718472
47. Peace Out, Dawg!, Andrews McMeel, 2002. ISBN 0-7407-2677-3
48. Got War?, 2003. ISBN 978-0-7407-3817-3.
49. Talk to the Hand, Andrews McMeel, 2004. ISBN 0-7407-4671-5
50. Heckuva Job, Bushie!, Andrews McMeel, 2006. ISBN 0-7407-6200-1
51. Welcome to the Nerd Farm, Andrews McMeel, 2007. ISBN 0-7407-6850-6
52. Tee Time in Berzerkistan, Andrews McMeel, 2009. ISBN 978-0740773570
53. Red Rascal's War, Andrews McMeel, 2011. ISBN 1449408206
54. Squared Away: A Doonesbury Book, Andrews McMeel, 2013, ISBN 978-1-4494-3058-0
55. The Weed Whisperer, Andrews McMeel, 2015, ISBN 978-1-4494-7224-5
56. Yuge!: 30 Years of Doonesbury on Trump. A collection of Donald Trump comics. Andrews McMeel, 2016. ISBN 978-1449481339
57. #SAD!: Doonesbury in the Time of Trump, Andrews McMeel, 2018. ISBN 978-1449489977, ISBN 1449489974
58. Lewser! More Doonesbury in the Time of Trump, Andrews McMeel, 2020. ISBN 978-1-5248-5950-3
59. Former Guy: Doonesbury in the Time of Trumpism, Andrews McMeel, 2022. ISBN 978-1-5248-7558-9
60. Day One Dictator: More Doonesbury in the Time of Trumpism, Andrews McMeel, 2024. ISBN 978-1-5248-9434-4

The appearance and contents of the annual collections have changed over the years, but first printings of the books fall in six distinctly different archetypes.

1–13. White cover background, app. 133 x 203 mm (5 1/4 x 8"). 128 pp., one daily strip in B&W per page. Each title contains 124 dailies (#1 only 122 dailies, though).

14–26. Colored cover background, app. 154 x 208 mm (6 1/8 x 8 1/4"). 128 pp., one daily strip in B&W per page. Each title contains 124 dailies.

27–31. Multicolored covers, title with large initial. Otherwise identical in appearance to #'s 14–26.

32–41. Multicolored covers, app. 217 x 229 mm (8 1/2 x 9"). 96 pp., 2–3 daily strips or one Sunday strip without top tier per page, all in B&W. Contents vary widely, each title holding 180–200 dailies and 20-30 Sundays.

42–52. Multicolored covers, app. 230 x 276 mm (9 x 10 7/8"). 152 pp., 3 daily strips in B&W or 1 complete Sunday strip in full color per page. Each title contains 294 dailies and 48 Sundays – with three exceptions:

- 47: 144 pp., containing 294 dailies and 40 Sundays
- 50: 256 pp., containing 510 dailies and 80 Sundays
- 52. 240 pp., containing 462 dailies and 80 Sundays

53–55. Hardbound with dust cover, app. 224 x 234 mm (8 3/4 x 9 1/4"). 240 pp., 3 daily strips or one Sunday strip without top tier per page, all in full color. Contents vary:

- 53. 468 dailies and 78 Sundays
- 54. 483 dailies and 73 Sundays
- 55. 176 pp., containing 180 dailies and 110 Sundays

56-60. Softcover, more than 100 Sunday strips (without the top tier), all in full color. The "NY Times article" about Hitler on the back cover of "Day One Dictator" is satire by Trudeau.

== Anthology collections ==
1. The Doonesbury Chronicles. Contains 501 daily strips published Oct. 26, 1970 to Dec. 20, 1974 and 79 Sunday strips from Dec. 27, 1970 to Dec. 22, 1974 (about 38% of strips published during this time). Introduction by Garry Wills, Henry Holt and Company, 1975. ISBN 0-03-014906-1
2. Doonesbury's Greatest Hits. Contains 516 daily strips published Jan. 7, 1975 to Dec. 10, 1977 and 80 Sunday strips from Jan. 26, 1975 to Dec. 25, 1977 (about 55% of strips published during this time). Introduction by William F. Buckley, Jr., Henry Holt and Company, 1978. ISBN 0-8050-0883-7
3. The People's Doonesbury: Notes from Underfoot. Contains 520 daily strips published Jan. 9, 1978 to June 21, 1980 and 76 Sunday strips from Jan. 22, 1978 to June 29, 1980 (about 66% of strips published during this time). Also contains a rare interview with Trudeau for an introduction, as well as introducing each section of reprinted comics. Holt, Rinehart and Winston, 1981. ISBN 0-03-049166-5 (hardbound) ISBN 0-03-049171-1 (paperback)
4. Doonesbury Dossier: The Reagan Years. Contains 523 daily strips published Jan. 7, 1981 to Jan. 1, 1983 and 81 Sunday strips from Jan. 6, 1981 to Jan. 2, 1983 (about 83% of strips published during this time). Introduction by Gloria Steinem. Holt, Rinehart and Winston, 1984. ISBN 0-03-000072-6 (paperback) ISBN 0-03-061729-4 (hardback)
5. Doonesbury Deluxe: Selected Glances Askance. Contains 538 daily strips published Oct. 1, 1984 to April 4, 1987 and 82 Sunday strips from Sept. 30, 1984 to April 5, 1987 (about 67% of strips published during this time). Introduction by Studs Terkel. Henry Holt and Company, 1987. ISBN 0-8050-0596-X
6. Recycled Doonesbury: Second Thoughts on a Gilded Age. Contains 540 daily strips published Dec. 1, 1986 to May 3, 1990 and 79 Sunday strips from April 26, 1987 to Sept. 9, 1990 (about 50% of strips published during this time). Andrews McMeel, 1990. ISBN 0-8362-1824-8
7. The Portable Doonesbury. Contains 541 daily strips published Mar. 5, 1990 to Feb. 4, 1993 and 79 Sunday strips from May 13, 1990 to April 25, 1993 (about 68% of strips published during this time). Andrews McMeel, 1993. ISBN 0-8362-1734-9
8. The Bundled Doonesbury: A Pre-Millennial Anthology. Contains 660 daily strips published Jan. 11, 1995 to May 2, 1998 and 79 Sunday strips from Feb. 12, 1995 to Aug. 2, 1998 (about 60% of strips published during this time). Includes bundled CD-ROM Doonesbury Flashbacks: 25 Years of Serious Fun with 8,062 comics from 1970 to May 1995. Andrews McMeel, 1998. ISBN 0-8362-6752-4
9. Doonesbury Redux. Contains the strips collected in Duke 2000 and The Revolt of the English Majors: 588 daily strips published May 10, 1999 to May 26, 2001 and 96 Sunday strips from June 27, 1999 to Aug. 12, 2001 (about 98% of strips published during this time). Gramercy, 2004. ISBN 0-517-22407-0
10. Doonesbury: The War Years. Contains the strips collected in Peace Out, Dawg! and Got War?: 582 daily strips published May 28, 2001 to July 19, 2003 and 88 Sunday strips from July 8, 2001 to July 20, 2003 (about 95% of strips published during this time). Gramercy, 2006. ISBN 0-517-22866-1

== Other collections and books ==
- Bull Tales: A Yale Comic Strip Reprints the original college newspaper strips, published originally before the series was syndicated.
- Michael J. Volume Two of Bull Tales collection, published by Yale humor magazine The Yale Record in 1970.
- Doonesbury: The Original Yale Cartoons, American Heritage Press, 1971. Paperback: Andrews McMeel, 1973. Library of Congress 73-9100. Foreword by Trudeau's Yale professor, Erich Segal. ISBN 0-8362-0550-2
- The Fireside Watergate (with Nicholas von Hoffman), Sheed & Ward, 1973. Paperback retitled Trout Fishing in the Reflecting Pool or the Fireside Watergate, Popular Library, 1973. Library of Congress 73-11506. The cover shows Zonker Harris with a snowglobe of the White House. The title references the fireside chats of President Roosevelt. The revised title spoofs Trout Fishing in America, the once-famous book by Richard Brautigan. The book is dedicated to Ron Ziegler. ISBN 0-8362-0547-2
- Tales from the Margaret Mead Taproom (with Nicholas von Hoffman), Sheed & Ward, 1976. Library of Congress 75-17055. The cover shows Uncle Duke with his aide MacArthur in Samoa. The title references anthropologist Margaret Mead and her book Coming of Age in Samoa. A caricature of the authors appears on page 19; Trudeau wears a Yale hat whilst flying a kite. ISBN 0-8362-0631-2
- A Doonesbury Special, A Director's Notebook. Preface by Faith Hubley, with an introduction by Trudeau (reprinted from TV Guide Magazine). ISBN 978-0-8362-1104-7 hardback ISBN 0-8362-1103-0 paperback
- Joanie, part of the Cartoons for New Children series. ISBN 0-8362-0581-2
- Doonesbury: A Musical Comedy, 1983. A book containing the script, lyrics and photographs from the short-lived Broadway musical. ISBN 0-517-05491-4
- The 1990 Doonesbury Stamp Album, A bound collection of humorous artistamps drawn for the strip's 20th anniversary. ISBN 0-14-012809-3
- Action Figure! The Life and Times of Doonesbury's Uncle Duke Contains selected strips from 1974 to 1991 focusing on Duke. Includes a Duke action figure packaged with three accessories: a chainsaw, a machine gun, and a liquor bottle and martini glass. Andrews McMeel, 1992. ISBN 0-8362-1702-0
- Dude: The Big Book of Zonker
- Flashbacks: Twenty-Five Years of Doonesbury 25th anniversary book. Andrews McMeel, 1995. ISBN 0-8362-0436-0 (paperback) ISBN 0-8362-0437-9 (hardback)
- The Long Road Home: One Step at a Time, 2005. Special 96 page collection, with proceeds going to the Fisher House charity. ISBN 0-7407-5385-1
- The War Within: One More Step at a Time, 2006. Special 112 page collection, with proceeds going to the Fisher House charity. ISBN 0-7407-6202-8
- My Shorts R Bunching. Thoughts? The Tweets of Roland Hedley, 2009. ISBN 0-7407-9109-5
- 40: A Doonesbury Retrospective. A limited collection of strips spanning 40 years, plus 18 essays by the author, and a character map. Andrews McMeel, 2010. ISBN 978-0-7407-9735-4
- Signature Wound: Rocking TBI, 2010. Special 120 page collection, with proceeds going to the Fisher House charity. Andrews McMeel. ISBN 978-0-7407-9196-3

From 1984 to 1991, Henry Holt and Company reprinted select cartoons in an annual edition called the Doonesbury Desk Diary.

Most of Trudeau's original drawings for Doonesbury, along with letters, notebooks, and other archival materials, are in the collection of the Beinecke Rare Book and Manuscript Library at Yale University. Original drawings are also in the collections of the Library of Congress; the Smithsonian Institute's Museum of American History; the National Portrait Gallery; the National Museum of Health and Medicine; and the Billy Ireland Cartoon Library and Museum at Ohio State University.

== Games ==
- The Doonesbury Game, board game, published by Mikrofun, Inc. 1993.
- The Doonesbury Election Game: Campaign ’96, CD-ROM, published by Mindscape, Inc. 1996.
