= Mr. Butts =

Publication information
- Publisher: Universal Press Syndicate
- Created by: Garry Trudeau

Mr. Butts is a character in Garry Trudeau's comic strip Doonesbury. When Mike Doonesbury was asked to create an ad campaign aimed at teenage smokers, he suffered a morality crisis, and the hallucinatory Mr. Butts was the result. An eight-foot-tall (2.5 meter) cigarette with a goofy smile, Mr. Butts is the anthropomorphic personification of the tobacco industry. Stylistically he is reminiscent of Zap Comix, as pointed out by J. J. when first described to her by Mike.

At first "Buttsy" only appeared in Mike's dreams, and he took them as a sign of his morality rebelling. But Doonesbury often bends the line between fantasy and reality, and it was not long before Mr. Butts was being treated as a real person, interacting with other characters and even testifying before Congress for the Tobacco Institute.

Butts seems to have a very naïve personality when it comes to the product he represents. He honestly cannot see that there is any connection between cigarettes and cancer, downplays the effect of nicotine addiction, and he is fully convinced that smoking will help make kids cool. He usually treats his appearances as public service announcements, addressing the audience directly to tell them "good news" about the tobacco industry.

In the real world, Mr. Butts has appeared in an animated anti-smoking commercial (voiced by Billy West), the third television appearance of a Doonesbury character after the animated special aired in 1977 and the Larry King Live appearance of Duke on 2000-03-13. He also appeared on hundreds of trashcans on Santa Monica, California's beaches as part of that city's awareness promotion of their new anti-smoking ordinance in August 2005.

Mr. Butts is sometimes accompanied by Mr. Jay, a large marijuana joint, along with Mr. Dum Dum (a large bullet personifying the National Rifle Association of America), and Mr. Brewski (a large beer can personifying the liquor industry). Trudeau often uses the appearances of these sidekicks to illustrate his own viewpoints on the legalization of marijuana. In addition, with the rising of vaping, there is also Juuly, a giant electronic cigarette, who cheerfully models herself on Mr. Butts. Mr. Butts was also a pseudonym (inspired by the Doonesbury character) of a then-anonymous informant who in 1995 sent 4,000 pages of incriminating Brown & Williamson tobacco company documents to researcher Stanton Glantz. The documents were used extensively in litigation against the tobacco industry and were the basis of the book The Cigarette Papers.
