= Ron Headrest =

Fictional character in comic strip Doonesbury

- Created by: Garry Trudeau

In-universe information
- Origin: United States
- Nationality: American

Ron Headrest is a fictional character in the comic strip Doonesbury.

During the 1980s, Garry Trudeau thought it would be fun to do a political parody of the television program Max Headroom (of which he was a fan). He combined the concept with the president, Ronald Reagan, to produce Ron Headrest, the world's first electronically simulated politician (the name "Headrest" was a humorous allusion to the frequent and lengthy naps that Reagan was notorious for).

The idea was that Ron had been created to serve as a backup president during the long periods Reagan spent on vacation. He appeared as a stylized version of Reagan's head and shoulders on a television screen, complete with sunglasses. Because he was electronic, he would have no memory troubles, and his sense of humor and attitude were designed to appeal to young voters.

It ends up being a disaster: Headrest is stuttering and incompetent, openly mocks the administration he is designed to serve, and causes nothing but trouble. During the first week of his appearance, he flashes the White House's phone number on his screen and tells children to call if they wanted "rock-solid information on safe sex" (because the number printed was accurate, the real world White House got calls which jammed their switchboards. Eventually, they got revenge by giving callers the number of Trudeau's editor).

In the continuity of the comic strip, the White House staff is less creative and simply tries to turn Headrest off. But like his televised counterpart, Ron escapes into the airwaves and begins causing trouble wherever he can find a television and someone to listen to him. He takes particular delight in tormenting Mike Doonesbury, whom he calls "Y-Person" (meaning "yuppie"). Headrest also seeks the 1988 Republican Party presidential nomination in his own right, but withdraws from the race, promising to go into reruns instead.

Ron appeared regularly throughout the Reagan and Bush presidencies and then began to show up less frequently. He only appeared a few times during the Clinton administration, and then disappeared entirely. The real Ronald Reagan had retired and left the public view, and Max Headroom's program was long since gone, making the character far less topical than he had once been. Although Doonesbury characters rarely disappear, Ron Headrest has not appeared since November 6, 1994.

== See also ==
- List of Doonesbury characters
