= Roland Hedley =

Publication information
- Publisher: Universal Press Syndicate
- Created by: Garry Trudeau

Roland Burton Hedley, III is a fictional character in the comic strip Doonesbury by Garry Trudeau, inspired by the on-air style of the veteran US reporter Sam Donaldson.

Hedley is a journalist who covers sports at the Saigon bureau for Time and, once called back, is commissioned to write an article about Walden Commune, where most of the strip's characters live during the 1970s. They fill his head with a lot of nonsense, convincing him that the hippie movement is coming back and that they represent a national trend. He is even convinced that Zonker's lilacs are marijuana plants.

Later he resurfaces in the strip as a television reporter for ABC News. By this point he has developed an extraordinarily large ego, which remains his defining trait to this day. He is a sensationalist, willing to stretch the truth and say anything that would further his career. Often he is sent on dangerous assignments, and it is implied that his superiors send him on these intentionally, hoping get rid of him. He plays along, knowing that the danger of his job will earn him higher ratings.

As a result, he has covered many of the dangerous political developments of the last 30 years, although he often greatly exaggerates the danger he personally faces in order to boost his ego. Any news story, no matter how important, can get sidetracked when he begins to talk about his three Emmys, his high ratings, his date with Christiane Amanpour, and so forth.

His most surreal appearances are two trips into the brain of Ronald Reagan, first to try to comprehend what the then presidential candidate was thinking during the 1980 presidential election, and then to try to unlock his memories of the Iran Contra Affair. Reagan's brain is depicted as decayed, calcified, and unable to process thoughts and memories, mocking Reagan's old age. It also contains a subconscious inhabited by a persona of Nancy Reagan called the "She-Mommy," a fornix filled with memories of “an idyllic America, with 5-cent cokes, Burma-Shave signs, and hard-working white people,” and a visual cortex which instead of viewing time normally "is only able to see backwards, through a rose-colored mist.” The story arcs were one of the most iconic and controversial strips in the history of Doonesbury, with many newspaper editors and critics characterizing them as mean-spirited. Trudeau revived the idea in a 2019 strip in which Hedley enters the brain of Donald Trump in a tour culminating with a visit to Trump's amygdala, which is portrayed as a literal echo chamber that amplifies conspiracy theories and caves in when Hedley shouts "Soros" into it.

After leaving ABC, Hedley works a brief stint as "chief content provider" for Yap!com, but goes back to television when the site is downsized by the AOL-Time Warner merger. He then works for CNN and later for Fox News. In this post he gets in trouble with his fellow journalists Rick Redfern and Mark Slackmeyer when they find out that he is taking bribes from the White House in order to give them "softballs" at press conferences. He ceases to do so, and his colleagues decide not to blow the whistle on him. In March 2009 he begins to tweet and that October Trudeau published My Shorts R Bunching. Thoughts?: The Tweets of Roland Hedley, the first collection of tweets from a single author. The Twitter account was closed in 2010, but Roland begins tweeting again a few weeks before the 2017 inauguration of Donald Trump.

In 2009 Fox news attempts to fire him as the High Definition format shows his facial skin in a gruesome way. He survives the attempt after threatening to sue his employers for discrimination against his allegedly work-related disability.

Over the history of the comic strip, this character's name has been given as Roland Hedley Burton Jr, Roland Burton Hedley, Jr. and Roland Burton Hedley III. The Washington Post's website at Doonesbury.com uses the last of these, although as recently as July 12, 2008 he identified himself as "Junior." Hedley's three names evoke the preppie "last name as first name" aura and may have been taken from names on the masthead of Time—Los Angeles Correspondent Roland Flamini, Boston Bureau Chief Sandra Burton and Editor-in-Chief Hedley Donovan.
