= Andy Lippincott =

Publication information
- Publisher: Universal Press Syndicate
- Created by: Garry Trudeau

Andy Lippincott is a fictional character in the comic strip Doonesbury. An attorney, he is the openly homosexual best-friend of Joanie Caucus, one of the core members of the strip's ensemble cast. Although Joanie initially sees Andy as a potential romantic partner, the two become best friends, and she supports him as he navigates the difficulties of gay culture in the 1980s, including his eventual contraction of HIV and subsequent death from the disease.

Andy is significant for a number of reasons in the history of newspaper comics, including being the first openly gay character and the first character to die of AIDS.

== Publication history ==
The character first appears in January 1976, in a law library. Joanie Caucus becomes attracted to him before Lippincott says he is gay. (His statement of orientation caused several papers to not run the strip for the week.) Joanie is heartbroken, and takes some time to recover. Lippincott contributes position papers to Virginia Slade's failed run for Congress in 1976. He disappears from the strip for a few years after this storyline.

In 1982, the character reappears as an organizer for the Bay Area Gay Alliance, and contributes to the congressional re-election of Lacey Davenport. In 1989 he returns to the strip again when he is diagnosed with AIDS. Over the course of the next year, Lippincott's battles with the disease, and eventual death from it, helped bring the AIDS crisis into popular culture. Ultimately, he is shown dying to the sound of the Beach Boys' song "Wouldn't It Be Nice", finally fulfilling his wish to hear the (then newly released) CD version of their album Pet Sounds.

Shortly thereafter, Andy made posthumous appearances in the strip, making several days of appearances in a self-made video shown during his memorial service. He later appears in the dreams of Joanie and Mark Slackmeyer, helping the latter come to terms with his own homosexuality.

== Significance ==
This storyline led to more notability for Garry Trudeau, but three newspapers of the 900 carrying the strip refused to publish it as being allegedly in bad taste.

Andy Lippincott may be the only fictional character with a panel on the AIDS quilt. The panel (created by G. Scott Austen, Marceo Miranda and Juan-Carlos Castano) reads: "In Loving Memory: Andy Lippincott 1945–1990. Community leader, conservationist, author, Olympic medalist, and winner of the Nobel Peace Prize!" The panel hangs in The NAMES Project Foundation's offices in Atlanta and was not actually sewn into a block of The AIDS Memorial Quilt. (Note: Details on Lippincott's panel for the AIDS quilt from the Doonesbury Flashbacks computer program by Garry Trudeau, published by Mindscape in 1995 (ISBN 0791118657).)
