= Jimmy Thudpucker =

Doonesbury comic strip character

Jimmy Thudpucker is a fictional character in the comic strip Doonesbury, created by Garry Trudeau.

He first appeared in the strip in 1975. He is generally seen as a combination of Bob Dylan and John Denver (and to some extent, Loudon Wainwright III), and became a rock star in the seventies, when he was only 19. Others have compared Thudpucker to a young Jackson Browne.

== Fictional character biography ==
Unlike many of the other parodied and fictional celebrities in the strip, who are often portrayed as shallow and conceited, Jimmy is essentially a good person; he is one of the few adult characters to retain the round eyes of innocence that the strip's child characters lose when they grow up. He is very moral and not afraid to turn down money for what he feels is right. He even wrote a song about Doonesbury character Ginny Slade to help her raise money for her campaign for free, because he agreed with her politics. Jimmy is also extremely devoted to his fans, his wife Jennifer, and their son, Feedback.

Jimmy expatriated to Vietnam during the 1990s, and became the number one act in the country. While there he performed in a benefit organized by Kim Rosenthal to help the poorly paid workers at a Nike plant. He has since returned to America.

Jimmy's biggest fault seems to be his habit of "reinventing" himself, often switching musical genres on a whim. When he does so he changes his name to match his new style; he became Jimmy Ray Thudpucker to perform country music, MC Jimmy to perform rap music, Jimmy T. to record a Christmas album, and James R. Thudpucker III to make an album of standards.

Jimmy supports file sharing, and firmly believes that in the future artists will make a modest living by touring because the recording industry will collapse and all music will be free. He has released all of his own music on the internet, to be freely shared, emulating the real world practice of Janis Ian (who has seen sales of her music radically rise after making her songs freely available on her website). Unfortunately in June 2014 he revealed that the "new model" of releasing his own music direct to his fans without a music label meant he was now living in his car.

In January 2009, he branched out into recording and selling ringtones. In February 2010, he visited Afghanistan with the USO show. On the return journey his helicopter was accidentally shot down by Jeff Redfern (who was on duty for the CIA). However, Jimmy and the other helicopter passengers survived unharmed.

In August 2022 it was revealed that he was now in the business of recording hold music as the ringtone market had cooled.

== Real world recordings ==
In a real-world crossover, Trudeau has twice arranged for Thudpucker's "music" to be recorded. James Allen Brewer, an actor ("Ryan and Sean's Not So Excellent Adventure"), producer ("Simply Sondheim – A 75th Birthday Salute"), and singer/songwriter co-wrote and sang, in character, on the single "Ginny's Song," released by Warner Bros. He also performed on the LP Jimmy Thudpucker's Greatest Hits, released by Windsong Records, which featured songs from the Academy Award-nominated A Doonesbury Special (1977), which also won the Special Jury Prize at the Cannes Film Festival.

The LP credits the composition of all but one song to "Jimmy Thudpucker". In reality, this was a collective pseudonym used by Brewer and other co-authors. "Take Your Life" is registered at BMI as being written by Brewer, Clifford Evens, David Foster and Garry Trudeau; "So Long" to Brewer and Foster; "You Can't Fight It" to Brewer, Trudeau and Laura Plotkin.

== Jimmy Thudpucker's Greatest Hits ==
Greatest Hits

Studio album by Jimmy Thudpucker
- Released: 1977
- Genre: Rock
- Length: 37:31
- Label: Windsong
- Producer: Steve Cropper

=== Track listing ===
All songs written by Jimmy Thudpucker, except where noted.

No.	Title	Length
1.	"You Can't Fight It"	3:10
2.	"Take Your Life"	4:08
3.	"I Don't Know My Love"	3:33
4.	"Stop"	3:09
5.	"Indian Brown" (Renée Armand, Kerry Chater)	3:18
6.	"Where Can I Go"	3:47
7.	"I Do Believe"	2:29
8.	"Fretman Sam"	3:52
9.	"Ginny's Song"	3:22
10.	"So Long/Overture '73"	6:43

=== Personnel ===
- James Allen Brewer - lead vocals
- Donald "Duck" Dunn – bass
- Dennis Parker – bass
- Jeff Porcaro – drums
- Keith Moon – drums (on "Ginny's Song")
- Mike Baird – drums
- David Foster – keyboards
- Bill Champlin – organ, background vocals
- Steve Cropper – guitar
- Jay Graydon – guitar
- Steve Lukather – guitar
- Dan Ferguson – guitar
- Steve Forman – percussion
- Leon Rubenholt – harmonica
- Jim Horn – alto saxophone
- Bobby Keys – saxophone (on "Ginny's Song")
- Doug Atwell – viola
- Chuck Findley, Trevor Lawrence, Steve Madaio, Quitman Dennis, Don Menza – horns
- Donny Gerrard, Brooks Hunnicutt, Lisa Roberts, Joyce King, Jana Lee Dare, Jeanne Anne Chapman, Renée Armand, Verna Richardson, Jim Haas, Ron Hickland, Stan Farber – background vocals
