= Weltschmerz (comics) =

Comic strip by Gareth Lind

Weltschmerz was a weekly comic strip in Canada, written and drawn by cartoonist Gareth Lind. The strip, published in alternative newsweeklies such as Eye Weekly, offers political and social satire with a regular cast of characters, similar to Doonesbury by Garry Trudeau, but with more emphasis on caricature.

Characters in the strip included computer geek Horst Weltschmerz, his girlfriend Celia Jones, his friends Frank, Cindy, Cosmo and Max, and Max's partner Des. Political figures such as George W. Bush, Stephen Harper and Dalton McGuinty also appear as characters.

Storylines included Horst and Celia's attempt to have a child (so far unsuccessfully); Raj being held in prison on a security certificate, then extradited to Pakistan on suspicion of being a terrorist, then kidnapped by terrorists; and Frank running for Liberal leader on a porn-based platform.

The Weltschmerz web site was expanded to a blog-based format, allowing an archive that can be sorted by theme and character.

The first Weltschmerz collection, Attack of the Same-Sex Sleeper Cells, was self-published in spring 2006.

Weltschmerz ran from 1994 to 2008.
