= B. D. (Doonesbury) =

Fictional character

Publication information
- Publisher: Universal Press Syndicate
- Created by: Garry Trudeau

B.D. is a fictional character in Garry Trudeau's popular comic strip Doonesbury. In the comic strip, nobody is certain what "B.D." is short for (he gives his last name as "D"), but he was based on Brian Dowling, quarterback at Yale University, where Trudeau attended college. In the 1983 stage adaptation of the strip, Doonesbury: A Musical Comedy, his full name was revealed to be Brian John Dowling (that of his real life namesake).

== History ==
B.D. was first introduced on September 30, 1968, in Trudeau's strip Bull Tales in the Yale Daily News. At the time, B.D.'s helmet was white, with a block letter "Y" for Yale.

B.D. was reintroduced in the first frame of the Doonesbury strip in 1970 in which the popular quarterback became roommate to the nerdy, awkward Mike Doonesbury at Walden College. At Walden, B.D. wore a football helmet with a star on the side, replacing the Yale "Y". Mike and B.D. had many differences and initially could not stand each other.

As captain of the Walden football team, B.D. faced many tests of his short patience. His teammates could rarely keep their minds on the game, opting to have intense philosophical and political discussions during huddle. This became much worse when self-described "freak" Zonker Harris joined the team.

B.D. is notable for having rather conservative views, in contrast to the more liberal beliefs of the other main characters, Mike, Mark and Zonker. He deplored welfare and marijuana use. In some of the early strips, he was even portrayed as slightly racist and sexist, and a supporter of the Vietnam War. He eventually joined the U.S. Army and went to South Vietnam simply to get out of writing a term paper. He found military life to be a good fit for him, and enjoyed his tour of duty immensely in sharp contrast to most of his colleagues. While in Vietnam, B.D. met and befriended Phred, a Viet Cong "terrorist" who captured him, only to get them both lost. They bonded after finding a cache of Schlitz beer and remain friends to this day. He was awarded a Purple Heart for being injured while lost (he cut his hand on a beer can). After his discharge he visited Phred for Christmas in his home village of Quảng Trị during an intense battle there . He ran into Phred, now a venture capitalist working with B.D.’s friend from the war, again while visiting Vietnam after the normalization of diplomatic relations, and Phred offered him a job as a performer at a Vietnam War-style theme park.

In 1971, he started dating Boopsie, and they moved into Walden Commune with Mike, Mark, Zonker, and others. He graduated with the original Doonesbury characters during the strip's hiatus in 1983, and with Boopsie moved to Malibu, California, where he played as a third-string quarterback for the Los Angeles Rams, and worked as Boopsie's manager while she tried to develop a career in Hollywood.

B.D. remained in the Army Reserve and was called up for the Gulf War in 1991. There he became friends with Ray Hightower, who subsequently became a recurring character in the strip. While on leave B.D. cheated on Boopsie with a female officer. The affair ended abruptly when it turned out the other soldier was a captain while B.D. (at the time) was a corporal.

When Boopsie learned of the affair she broke up with B.D., but eventually they reconciled, married and in 1992 had a daughter, Samantha (Sam). During the early 1990s, B.D. worked as a cop in the California Highway Patrol, changing his military helmet for a policeman's motorcycle helmet. Eventually he was hired by his alma mater Walden College to coach the football team he was once captain of.

He was recalled up to military duty and served briefly, keeping order after the terrorist attacks at the World Trade Center, and in 2003 he was sent to fight the Iraq War.

The helmet finally came off on April 21, 2004 when, while serving in Iraq, B.D. lost a leg; his reaction to its loss was a loud, anguished, "Son of a bitch!", which caused the strip to be pulled from some newspapers. His friend and fellow soldier Ray Hightower had him airlifted to safety in time, and he survives as an amputee. He has successfully gone through physical therapy and can walk with the aid of a high-tech prosthetic "C-Leg". His only reflection on losing the helmet was on July 31, 2004, when he thought to himself, "Oh yeah, my helmet. What the hell was THAT all about?"

Although he was physically in good condition, his mental state deteriorated since returning home. B.D. began drinking too much, suffered from nightmares and became highly irritable. Realizing the seriousness of his problems, he entered therapy in January 2006. B.D. shows great reluctance or even fear about discussing his Iraq service with the counselor. This is revealed to stem from guilt over an incident wherein he ordered the driver of his HMMWV to drive through a crowd in order to escape an ambush of the Iraqi insurgency.

In 2008–2009, B.D. spent time and efforts on helping another wounded veteran known as Toggle, who was injured in similar circumstances.

== B.D.'s helmet ==
One of B.D.'s oddest traits was his helmet. For 34 years he was never seen without one. He wore a football helmet at college, as a coach and as a pro football player, a soldier's helmet in the army, a California Highway Patrol motorcycle officer's helmet when he was a police officer. His only explanations for this were "My ears stick out" or "I have bad hair". In the February 21, 2006, strip he revealed that his mother used to put helmets on him, as a means of protection, when he was a child. When Ray visits B.D. in the hospital after losing a leg, he's more shocked at seeing B.D.'s hair than his injury.

== Chronology of major events ==
Date	Event
26 October 1970	First appearance, wearing a white helmet with a star (the star is later revealed to be green)
5 February 1972	Leaves for Vietnam
12 December 1984	Becomes a third-string quarterback for the Los Angeles Rams, now wears that team's helmet
3 August 1987	Returns to wearing his Walden College helmet
16 August 1987	Retires from professional sports
5 September 1990	Called up for the first Persian Gulf War
10 September 1990	Changes helmet to desert camouflage
18 January 1991	Field promoted to Sergeant
6 May 1991	Returns home from first Gulf War
20 April 1992	Marries Boopsie, daughter Samantha born
12 May 1992	Called up again to protect Los Angeles after the start of the 1992 Los Angeles Riots
9 September 1992	Joins the California Highway Patrol, changes helmet
1992	Moves back to Walden to coach the football team
2003	Called up for the second Gulf War, promoted to lieutenant
21 April 2004	Loses leg and helmet

== Sources ==
- Gene Weingarten (2006-10-22). "Doonesbury's War". The Washington Post. p. W14.
