= List of Doonesbury characters =

The comic strip Doonesbury, by Garry Trudeau, features an extensive cast of characters with complex interpersonal relationships; as of 2018, the strip's official website lists twenty-four primary characters, with dozens more having been featured over the years, including some who were phased out of the strip only to be reintroduced years later. Kim Rosenthal, for example, first appeared as a recurring child character in the 1970s, then as a teenager in the 1980s, and was reintroduced as an adult in the 1990s.

== Main characters ==
- Mike Doonesbury (October 26, 1970) – Former Walden College student, former roommate of B.D., and former Walden commune member, ex-advertising man and then co-founder of a software start-up; ex-husband of J.J., husband of Kim, and father of Alex. Originally from Tulsa, Oklahoma and the main protagonist of the strip.
- B.D. (October 26, 1970) – husband of Boopsie. A reservist and veteran of Vietnam and both Gulf Wars, he lost a leg in Iraq. Known for his conservative views and (until April 21, 2004) wearing a series of helmets (originally football helmets, and later desert camouflage, riot gear, and California Highway Patrol). A running gag involves his name never being revealed; when his future wife's agent, Sid, queried him on his surname, he replied "D." When he is injured, the doctor asks his wife, Boopsie (see below), "By the way, what is 'D'?" she replies "He's never told me. I think it's birth order." The only hint as to his full name came in the Doonesbury musical, in which he is referred to as "B. John Dowling". The character was originally inspired by Brian Dowling, the captain of Yale's football team in 1968.
- Mark Slackmeyer (November 19, 1970, unnamed until November 30) – Former campus revolutionary turned radio commentator, and one of several openly gay characters in the strip after coming out on public radio January 18, 1994.
- Zonker Harris (September 21, 1971) – Stereotypical hippie and founder of the Walden Commune. During college he was also a football player, briefly Lieutenant Governor of American Samoa, and a professional tanner. After graduation he went to Haiti to study medicine, won $23 million in the lottery, and spent most of it to buy his Uncle Duke out of zombie slavery, and the remainder to become an ennobled British lord (His Lordship the Viscount St. Austell-in-the-Moor Biggleswade-Brixham). Also works occasionally as a nanny. After his campaign to enable public access to some of California's beaches, a beach access road in Malibu was named in his honor. Fired from McFriendly's restaurant because of drug use, tardiness and a number of other reasons just as he was about to lead strikers during the Minimum Wage Protests, he began a legal marijuana venture with his nephew Zipper in Colorado, where they are mistaken for "that nice gay couple".
- Joanie Caucus (September 10, 1972) – Ex-housewife and "libbie" who left her first husband Clinton Caucus and two unnamed children (one of whom reappears in adulthood as daughter J.J.) to join Mike and Mark "on the road" in Colorado. After joining the gang at the Walden commune, she was hired as the caregiver at the local day care center, received her J.D. from University of California, Berkeley School of Law, worked with Mike on the John Anderson campaign, was chief of staff to Congresswoman Lacey Davenport, and worked in the Clinton Justice Department. She lived with and eventually married journalist Rick Redfern, with whom she had a child, Jeff. After seeing her great-grandsons "playing Trump" by staging a mock fight with name-calling, she agreed to come out of retirement to help Elizabeth Warren tweet against Donald Trump.
- Rick Redfern (July 1, 1976) – Husband to Joanie and father to Jeff. He worked as a reporter for The Washington Post before being laid off. Currently a freelance blogger. Generally portrayed as very weary/phlegmatic and somewhat clueless as a father. In appearance the character is based on Washington Post reporter Bob Woodward as he was portrayed by Robert Redford in All the President's Men.
- J.J. Caucus (possibly April 22, 1973, as a child, unnamed until September 10, 1979) – Daughter of Joanie ("J.J." is "Joan Junior"). She was originally engaged to Zeke, but married Mike, eventually left Mike for Zeke (and married him in March 2001), and later won a MacArthur Fellowship (but still doesn't know that she was nominated by Mike, who did so in the hope that her winning would relieve him of paying alimony). Former performance artist, current modern artist and sometimes irresponsible free spirit. Mother of Alex Doonesbury and half-sister to Jeff Redfern.
- Zeke Brenner (heard July 24, 1977, appears June 25, 1979) – Former caretaker for Uncle Duke, who once mistook him for an intruder and shot him. Totally lacking in responsibility, he accidentally burned down Duke's house. He married J.J. on the second try despite being sleazy in March 2001. Despised by his wife's daughter Alex, who refers to him as "Uncle Stupidhead" and from whom he stole and sold a valuable collection of dolls.
- Kim Rosenthal (May 5, 1975) – Jewish-raised Vietnamese orphan (the "last orphan out of Vietnam"), geek and Mike's second wife. Dropped out of a program towards a doctorate in computer science at MIT because it was "too easy".
- Alexandra "Alex" Doonesbury (born November 30, 1988, named August 9, 1989) – Daughter of Mike and J.J. who lived with her father and Kim, before attending and graduating from MIT (2006–2010), and holds several patents. A techie, Alex bonded with future-stepmother Kim over the computer. More or less a liberal foil for her more moderate father. She met Toggle online (March 21, 2009) but B.D., who knew both, facilitated their meeting (April 6, 2009). The two hit it off and began dating. They got engaged in early February 2012 and married in June (sequence June 11–23, 2012). On January 22, 2013 it was announced that Alex was pregnant with twins. Alex received her Ph.D. in the June 6, 2013 strip and went into labor at the ceremony in the following day's strip. The twins are named Eli and Danny, after buddies of Toggle who didn't make it home from Iraq. In the February 4, 2018, strip, it is revealed that Alex has a third child, a girl (named as Rosie in the March 3, 2019 strip).
- Leo "Toggle" DeLuca – A veteran of the Iraq War. Toggle, a young heavy metal fan, was wounded in an ambush while serving as Ray Hightower's driver, and returned home with expressive aphasia and a loss of sight in one eye. B.D., his former commanding officer, often checks in to see how he is doing. He juggles music studies with working as an engineer in a recording studio. While recovering from his injuries, Toggle met Alex Doonesbury through Facebook. The two hit it off and began dating. They got engaged in early March 2012 and married in June 2012. Has three children with Alex.
- Jimmy Thudpucker (mentioned September 23, 1975, appears September 25, 1975) – Overnight success as a rock star at 19. Husband of Jennifer, father of Feedback. Later moved to Vietnam. In recent years, has frequently made wholesale changes to his music style (folk, rap, country), changing his name with each genre switch (to Jimmy Ray Thudpucker, James R. Thudpucker III, etc.) Modeled partially on a combination of Bob Dylan, Jackson Browne and John Denver.
- Barbara Ann "Boopsie" Boopstein (September 15, 1971, as "Boopsie") – Cheerleader turned actress, model, New Age channeler, and generic starlet. She is married to B.D.; they have a daughter named Sam. Was acting coach for the Walden football team while B.D. was deployed in the Gulf. She claims to have been reincarnated many times. Has a policy of not doing nude scenes in films "unless the film is in trouble." Used to channel the ancient warrior Hunk-Ra, who still appears sporadically.
- Zipper Harris (September 7, 1998) – Zonker's nephew and Walden undergraduate; his roommate was Jeff Redfern. Currently runs a legal marijuana farm in Colorado with his uncle Zonker.
- Nguyen van Phred (February 16, 1972) – "Phred" for short. The Viet Cong "terrorist" who became friends with B.D. when he was deployed to Vietnam, got lost while out on patrol, and was captured by Phred, who was also lost; later Vietnam's delegate to the United Nations, last seen working for Nike in Vietnam.
- Roland Burton Hedley, III (mentioned March 4, 1974, appears March 5, 1974) – Former print journalist (to use that term generously), moved to television and then the Internet. Intermittent Tweeter extraordinaire. Currently working for Fox News.
- Jeff Redfern (born December 31, 1982, appears January 1, 1983) – Joanie and Rick's son; J.J.'s half-brother and Alex's uncle. A sort of latchkey child, Jeff graduated from Walden (and stopped rooming with Zipper Harris), formerly worked for the Central Intelligence Agency with Havoc, and was in Afghanistan working for contractor Jack Overkill. Through social networking, Jeff established himself as the mysterious but fictional anti-Taliban fighter known as the "Red Rascal" ("Sorkh Razil" in the local dialect). In early 2012, he received a seven-figure advance for his next two books, enabling him to purchase a 12-bedroom trophy mansion, but was evicted in October 2012 when he was unable to keep up the payments and was forced to move back in with his parents (under very strict conditions laid down by his mother). Suffered from writer's block for some time, but with motivation, his writing has improved enough to turn in a new manuscript.
- Uncle Duke (mentioned July 5, 1974, appears July 8, 1974) – A family friend of the Harrises (and thus "uncle by courtesy" of Zonker), Vietnam War veteran, former Rolling Stone writer, governor of American Samoa and ambassador to China, once the proconsul of Panama, former owner of "Club Scud" in Kuwait City, ex-orphanage manager (where he realized one of the orphans, Earl, was his illegitimate son), and former mayor of the fictional Al Amok, Iraq. He has also been a drug smuggler (and heavy user), an enemy of John Denver, head coach of the Washington Redskins, toady to Donald Trump, bounty hunter (along with his son Earl) and a zombie slave to ex-Haitian President Jean-Claude Duvalier. Currently works as a super-lobbyist for his son Earl's lobbying firm (which seems to specialize in representing dictators and tyrants); one of his biggest clients was Trff Bmzklfrpz, the now-former President-for-Life of the Republic of Berzerkistan. His character was initially based on Gonzo journalist Hunter S. Thompson's pseudonymous self-portrait, Raoul Duke.
- Ching "Honey" Huan (January 22, 1976) – Originally Duke's interpreter when he was Ambassador to China during the Nixon era, she fell in love with him (a feeling that was never reciprocated) and became his constant companion until 2006 when she grew disillusioned with him. Inspired by Tang Wensheng (Mao's interpreter when meeting with Nixon) and partially Marcie of Peanuts. Following her return to China, she is currently the Vice-Minister for Transportation for the Chinese government (January 28, 2018).
- Mr. Butts (April 19, 1989) – A hallucinatory walking, talking cigarette, conceived by Mike as part of an ad campaign to represent the completely self-serving interests of the tobacco industry. Initially only seen by Mike, though now a character who can pop up in a variety of settings.
- Alice P. Schwarzman (August 24, 1973) and Elmont – Two homeless people, Alice first appeared as a garment worker who was a regular at a bar where Zonker was bartender. She later re-appeared as a homeless character and subsequently married Elmont, a deranged man, in order to move up the list for public housing; Rev. Sloan performed the ceremony. As the affluent Rep. Lacey Davenport became senile, she began to believe Alice was her deceased sister Pearl.
- The Rev. Scot Sloan (January 10, 1972) – Described by Look magazine as "the fighting young priest who can talk to the young". A streetwise priest and unofficial chaplain at Walden. Named for the Rev. William L. "Scotty" McLennan, Jr., Trudeau's undergraduate roommate, and the Rev. William Sloane Coffin, Yale's chaplain when Trudeau attended. He declared that he and Joanie Caucus "used to date," although when was not indicated.
- Sid Kibbitz (November 15, 1982) – Sid first appeared in 1982 to help Duke and Alice Schwarzman produce a movie on the life of John DeLorean, and later became Boopsie's agent.
- President King (November 30, 1970) – The president of Walden College. Based on Kingman Brewster, Jr., president of Yale when Trudeau was a student. (Indeed, the same character appeared in Bull Tales more directly as Brewster.)

== Other characters ==
- Jim Andrews (February 9, 1974) – A greedy executive who worked for Universal Petroleum, and was later employed by the administration of George W. Bush. Favors lax government oversight on environmental protection. He is a Walden alumnus, and was friends with the late Phil Slackmeyer. Jim was named after Trudeau's first editor at Universal Press Syndicate. The book, The People's Doonesbury, is dedicated to the memory of Andrews.
- Mr. Jay (May 21, 1989) – A hallucinatory walking, talking marijuana joint. Feels inadequate next to Mr. Butts because despite his reputation, he is relatively harmless.
- Lacey Davenport (May 15, 1974 – August 15, 1998) – Republican U.S. Congresswoman, now deceased – reminiscent of New Jersey Congresswoman Millicent Fenwick. Trudeau was asked in 1976 if the similarities were deliberate, and laughed at the reporter, saying "I really don't know her that well." Fenwick was said, in the same article, to not know about Doonesbury and could not remember having met Trudeau. Lacey and her husband Dick sometimes appear to Jeremy Cavendish as ghosts.
- Dick Davenport (May 15, 1974 – June 11, 1986) – Lacey's longtime friend and later husband. An avid watcher of endangered bird species. Died in a controversial 1986 strip asking God to let him live just long enough to take a picture of a rare Bachman's warbler (he succeeded). Lacey and her husband Dick sometimes reappear to Jeremy Cavendish.
- Benjamin (a.k.a. Sal Putrid or Benjy) Doonesbury (possibly November 6, 1971, unnamed, or December 27, 1971) – Mike's younger brother. He later became a stereotypical punk rocker. Like his brother Mike, he too went to Walden. Started a condom distribution franchise at Walden called "Dr. Whoopee". The company was later revealed to be run by Uncle Duke. He currently lives in a mansion in Florida.
- Daisy Doonesbury (June 5, 1971 – March 1, 2011) – Mike and Benjamin's mother. Often called "The Widow Doonesbury", she lived in Seattle before her death. She used to live on the Doonesbury farm near Tulsa and represented the current state of the ailing family farms in America. The Widow's health began to deteriorate and she moved in with her son Mike in Seattle. Her funeral was shown in the January 3, 2011, strip.
- Marcia Feinbloom – Mike's former secretary at Mr. Bellows' advertising business. She is still looking for her perfect man to marry even though she's in her 60s. She once dated Zonker, but nothing serious happened between them. Last seen following the 9/11 attacks. Her religious background is Jewish.
- Havoc (August 26, 1986) – A CIA operative – real name Terry Blackburn Jr. – who has conducted numerous covert operations in Nicaragua and Afghanistan. He was Jeff Redfern's boss during his internship at the CIA and teaches a class on torture at Walden.
- Ray Hightower (September 24, 1990) – An African-American soldier whose friendship with B.D. began during the Gulf War, in which Ray was wounded. They were unemployed until the 1992 Los Angeles riots when they were called up to quell the riot and later by the California Highway Patrol following that event. Ray fought in the Iraq War with a blog updating his status and telelinking his wife from time to time, and survived the bomb which injured Toggle. He was later discharged with post-traumatic stress disorder.
- Rufus (a.k.a. Thor) Jackson (April 5, 1971) – A poor African-American who gave a viewpoint on the Civil Rights issues in the 70s. Much younger than the rest of the main Doonesbury cast.
- Calvin (January 19, 1971) – Campus radical and Black Panther, prominent in the strip in the early seventies.
- George (February 9, 1972) – One of B.D.'s fellow soldiers in Vietnam. Later gained a great deal of weight and went into business with Phred in Vietnam, giving tours to former American GIs.
- Andy Lippincott (January 27, 1976 – May 24, 1990) – A law school classmate of Joanie's. She was romantically interested in him until he revealed that he was gay. Was later diagnosed with and died of AIDS. His ghost makes occasional appearances in the strip.
- Didi Robins (May 18, 1971) – One of the members at the Walden Commune, originally introduced as Bernie's girlfriend. She helped found a lesbian magazine, but is straight. She was also J.J.'s art assistant when she lived in New York in the 80s.
- Phil Slackmeyer (December 23, 1970 – August 4, 2002) – Father of Mark. A wealthy, conservative, corporate businessman. Served a term in prison for insider trading. He died in 2002. (In the August 18, 1971, strip he is referred to as Morris, not Phil.)
- Marilou Slackmeyer (December 28, 1970) – Mark's mother, later divorced from Phil Slackmeyer by him in favor of a trophy wife.
- Mark's "Cousin Bob" (August 9, 1971) – FBI agent needing Mark's help to infiltrate "the drug culture".
- B.D.'s parents (April 14, 1971) – Introduced without names when B.D. goes home after his father loses his job. His mother is Maria (August 6, 1971).
- Zonker's parents – First appear briefly on December 20, 1971, but are redeveloped later. His father appears in regular form on June 27, 1973, his mother on December 14, 1974.
- Virginia "Ginny" Slade (August 19, 1974) – During the 1970s, when Joanie moved to California to study law at University of California, Berkeley School of Law, she moved in with Ginny, a much younger, African-American law student. Ginny ran for Congress as a semester project, with Zonker, Andy Lippincott, and Jimmy Thudpucker contributing to her campaign. She lost the Democratic primary to a scandal-ridden incumbent, Congressman Phil Ventura, then re-entered the campaign as an independent. Close to Election Day, she chose to drop out so that long-time Republican candidate Lacey Davenport would win.
- Clyde Montana (August 19, 1974) – Ginny's boyfriend whom she later married. Former Black Panther. An obnoxious but lovable guy. Clyde himself later ran against Davenport in 1986. Clyde eventually did make it to Congress as a Republican (replacing Lacey Davenport when she stepped down in 1997) and in the snack business trying to create the perfect cookie for all races. He lost his re-election bid in the general Democratic victory in 2008.
- Woodrow (November 19, 1974) – An overachieving student in Ginny and Joanie's law classes. Obnoxious, sexist, and disliked by practically everybody (but perfectly oblivious to it). Later staff attorney to Lacey Davenport's Ethics Committee.
- Bobby Matthews (October 28, 1974, by name October 30, 1974) – A white boy attending an integrated school in the 1970s as a way to introduce the subject of busing into the strip.
- Malcolm Deveaux (November 2, 1974) – A black boy attending the same school as Bobby Matthews.
- Kirby (possibly March 9, 1971, unnamed; December 9, 1971 by name) – Mustache-wearing player on B.D. and Zonker's college football team. Slightly timid personality, admires Zonker, who sometimes takes him under his wing.
- Clinton Caucus (heard October 9, 1972; appears September 27, 1972) – Joanie's ex-husband.
- Chase Talbott III (October 28, 1996) – Formerly Mark's significant other, a conservative Republican, and co-host of their NPR show, All Things Being Equal.
- Bernie (February 22, 1971) – Mike's college lab partner and member of Walden Commune. A mad scientist, he invented a werewolf potion and spent a summer in Scotland searching for the Loch Ness Monster. He later founded a computer company and hired Mike. Appears when the strip needs a wealthy backer of long-shot ventures, or Mike needs financial advice.
- Cornell (June 6, 1977) – Zonker's longtime friend. Helped out terminally ill patients by handing out desserts filled with cannabis. Currently serving a ten-year prison sentence for the distribution of cannabis to the terminally ill.
- Jeremy Cavendish (September 16, 1981) – Wildly eccentric (in his own words, "genuinely strange") bird-watcher friend of Dick and Lacey Davenport. Wooed Lacey bizarrely and unsuccessfully after Dick's death. His madcap presence made both funerals less somber than they might otherwise have been. Occasionally visited by Dick and Lacey's spirits.
- Earl (April 12, 1995) – Discovered in an orphanage Duke attempted to run in the early 1990s. Honey sent one of Duke's warts off for DNA tests, which proved Earl was his son. He shares many of Duke's physical and moral qualities. Currently a lobbyist.
- Elias – A Puerto Rican Vietnam veteran. He lost a leg, but it was in a post-Vietnam motorcycle accident. He's B.D.'s counselor after B.D. came home from the Iraq War. Tries to help B.D. and others to overcome their post-traumatic stress.
- Ellie, Howard, and Jenny – Three kids who first appeared at the Walden Daycare where Joanie Caucus worked. They mainly gave the input on the women's rights issues and children's issues in the 70s and 80s.
- Uncle Henry (April 7, 1972) – Mike's uncle, tends to the Doonesbury farm. He's also a former county commissioner in Oklahoma and got caught in a corruption scandal only to be acquitted later.
- Mini-D – A small man who looks like Duke, sometimes pops out of Duke's head (via a flip-top scalp) when Duke is stoned.
- Nicole (September 29, 1971, spelled Nichole in the strip until 1977 and again in 1993) – A radical feminist and member of the Walden Commune. She and Mike almost had an affair after meeting at their class reunion (May 5, 1988), but broke it off when Mike learned J.J. was pregnant.
- MacArthur (January 16, 1975) – A native Samoan, Duke's assistant during his tenure as Governor of American Samoa. Appointed as governor after Duke resigned to become Ambassador to China. Last seen running a resort in Pago Pago.
- Samantha – B.D. and Boopsie's daughter, born in 1992. Mainly raised by her sitter Zonker. For a several-year period, she was shown to own an action doll modeled after Sarah Palin. A graduate of Walden University; she is currently a social media influencer/creative on Twitch. Revealed in the November 25, 2018 strip to be gender-fluid.
- Skip Willis (April 3, 1973) – A Vietnam POW who joined the commune for a period following his release.
- "Lava-Lava Lenny" Fali (August 4, 1975) – Massive Samoan football player. Duke and Zonker arrange an athletic scholarship for him at Walden, but he jumps to the Detroit Lions for a better offer. Duke later purchases his contract for the Washington Redskins.
- Nate and Amy Harris (July 21, 1975) – Zonker's great-uncle and aunt, presented in several flashback threads. Nate was a Minuteman in the American Revolution, interacting with Paul Revere and other revolutionaries. Reappears from time to time to make points about slavery, gender, and racial equality, the Constitution, etc.
- Samuel "Sammy" Tucker (July 4, 1976) – Former slave, appears periodically in Nate Harris Revolution-era flashbacks.
- Phil Ventura (June 28, 1976) – Long-time Congressman who defeated Ginny Slade in the primary but then lost to Lacey Davenport.
- Jennifer "Jenny" Thudpucker (mentioned September 26, 1975; appears February 22, 1977) – Jimmy's wife, gives birth March 18, 1977 to son, Feedback.
- Dan Doheny, Barney Perkins, Mr. Weinburger (February 28, 1977) – Students (Doheny a teaching assistant) in Henry Kissinger's history seminar at Georgetown. Later joined by Honey Huan.
- Duane Delacourt (March 21, 1977) – Secretary of Symbolism under President Carter. Later Executive Symbolist and Press Secretary for California Governor and presidential candidate Jerry Brown.
- Dr. Dan Asher (January 29, 1978) – Fellow at the California Institute for the Mellow, author of such best-sellers as "Mellow: How to Get It" and "Winning through Mellow", Mark's frequent guest on WBBY's "Profiles on Parade".
- Riley (July 17, 1978) – 15 year-old nephew of Redskins owner Edward Bennett Williams. Briefly Duke's protege, but turns him in to Rick Redfern.
- Trip Tripler – Benjamin Doonesbury's college roommate. Writer for George Will, officer in the U.S. Navy.
- Trff Bmzklfrpz – Former President-for-Life of the fictional Republic of Berzerkistan. Ex-President Bmzklfrpz was a typical dictator, and, according to an interview with Mark Slackmeyer, engaged in genocide and is anti-Semitic. In a parody of former Turkmenistan president Saparmurat Niyazov, he renamed the month of April (as well as a species of plant and a type of bird) "Trff", after himself. Uncle and Earl Duke acted as his advisors, and after he was airlifted out of Berzerkistan he moved himself into Duke's home. Until he is able to return to power, he is sponging off Duke while working on receiving asylum in the U.S. (August 9, 2011) and trying to get his memoirs published (August 16, 2011). He later became an adviser to Donald Trump (March 19, 2017).
- Drew – Alex Doonesbury's unusually attractive roommate at MIT. Currently a physician working at a hospital ICU.
- Melissa "Mel" Wheeler (March 26, 2007) – A US Army aviation mechanic who has been a victim of command rape. She first appears when B.D. meets her at the Vet Center where he gets treatment, and later re-enlists and deploys to Afghanistan. She has been promoted to grade E-5, Sergeant. Her best friend is Roz, a gay Army Specialist. In 2018 Melissa launched a campaign for public office, with Joanie Caucus serving as her campaign manager. Mel won the election and later received a courteous note from her Republican opponent, who apologized for insulting her during the campaign.
- Cricket (September 14, 1998) – Zipper's classmate and sometimes girlfriend at Walden.
- Mr. Bellows (died 11 September 2001 in the 9/11 attacks) – Mike's boss at the ad agency and later his boss at a smaller firm.
- Jimmy Crow – A human-sized crow who has appeared during recent election campaigns and is used to highlight voter-suppression measures (introduced July 23–28, 2012). His name is an apparent reference to Jim Crow discrimination.

== Real people ==
Numerous real-world figures, especially from politics, have appeared in the strip. Since the late 1980s some prominent politicians were given direct, but metaphorical, visual portrayals via Doonesbury Icons, avatars in the strip which abstractly represented them.

- Ronald Reagan – A character named Ron Headrest appeared as a computer-generated alter ego of President Reagan. Headrest was a composite of Max Headroom and Ronald Reagan. A similar caricature of Reagan appeared briefly in the film Back to the Future Part II.
- Dan Quayle – Famously appeared as a feather, depicting what Trudeau saw as the Vice-president's lightweight status, and as a pun on the bird species quail.
- George H. W. Bush – Trudeau drew the first President Bush as one of his "thousand points of light" from his speech at the 1988 Republican National Convention.
- Bill Clinton was depicted as a waffle, emphasizing the popular image that Clinton avoided taking firm stands on political issues; the symbol was voted for by readers over the alternative choice of a flipping coin.
- Newt Gingrich – Trudeau drew Gingrich as a lit bomb that would sometimes explode.
- George W. Bush was initially depicted as a "point of light" like his father (and the rest of the Bush family), later topped with a baseball cap and then a cowboy hat. Following his inauguration as president, he was depicted as an asterisk to indicate his dubious status as a Supreme Court-appointed head of state, still wearing a cowboy hat ("all hat, no cattle", a phrase used in Texas). After the beginning of the Iraq War he was shown as an asterisk wearing an imperial Roman military helmet. As the second Bush presidency encountered repeated difficulties, the helmet became continually more battered, so that, by his final appearance in office on January 18, 2009, the helmet had lost all of its decoration and was missing several large pieces.
- David Duke was depicted as a swastika, due to his extreme stands on racial issues, and his former status as a Grand Wizard of the Ku Klux Klan.
- Arnold Schwarzenegger was drawn as a groping hand, and often addressed by other characters as "Herr Gröpenfuhrer", a reference to accusations of sexual assault. He and Trump meet in the November 20, 2016 strip, where Schwarzenegger advised Trump to deal with accusations by patting women on the head (accidentally removing his toupee).
- Dick Cheney, late in his vice-presidency, was occasionally represented as a dark-cloaked figure, reminiscent of the Grim Reaper or the Emperor from Star Wars, bearing a Roman Imperial staff.
- Ben Quayle (son of Dan Quayle) was depicted September 19, 2010, as a smaller feather when he and his father are interviewed by Mark.

Most other prominent figures, after the strip's early years, stopped appearing directly in-frame, and were represented solely by their dialogue emerging from outside the frame, or from a television or a building shown from the outside (especially the White House). The small number of exceptions to this rule are below.

The following figures have been directly portrayed in-frame in the strip.

- Hubert Humphrey (May 7, 1971) – Mark Slackmeyer met with the Senator and former Vice president as part of his lobbying against the Vietnam War.
- Mike Mansfield (May 10, 1971) – Aging Senator from Montana, lobbied by Mark about the war and Congressional seniority.
- Joseph Alsop (May 11, 1971) – Prominent columnist confronted by Mike over his support for the Vietnam War.
- Dick Cavett (May 12, 1971) – Host of TV interview show on which Mark appears to discuss recent peace rally.
- John Lindsay (May 28, 1971) – Mayor of New York City.
- Frank Rizzo (August 7, 1972) – Mayor of Philadelphia. Orders Mike, Mark, and their motorcycle out of town, but relents when Mark introduces himself as a "fellow Italian-American".
- John Kerry (October 21, 1971 – October 23, 1971) – Spoke at Walden College for Vietnam Vets Against the War.
- Henry Kissinger (August 14, 1972) – Many appearances, but only appeared in-frame for the first few; subsequently is not shown directly.
- Mark Spitz (November 16, 1972) – Olympic swimming champion. Appeared in-frame as coda to Zonker's series of Spitz-related nightmares.
- Jann Wenner (July 11, 1974) – Owner of Rolling Stone magazine, consistently referred to as "Yawn Wenner". Appeared frequently during Uncle Duke's time as a writer for the magazine.
- Jeb Stuart Magruder (September 26, 1973) – Figure in the Watergate scandal.
- Dan Rather (January 20, 1974).
- William E. Simon (January 28, 1974) – Head of Federal Energy Administration ("Energy Czar") under Nixon and later Secretary of the Treasury ("Money Czar") under Nixon and Ford. Generally depicted seated in throne-like chair with at most nose and pipe visible, referred to by staff as "Your Czarship" or "Your Exchequership".
- Neil Young (July 13, 1974) – Attended a party thrown by Rolling Stone editor Jann Wenner (seen November 7, 1974) for Zonker on his first visit to Uncle Duke. Asked by Zonker what his new album's message was, Young's stammering, incoherent reply involved "energy".
- Gladys Knight & the Pips (July 28, 1974) – Singing "Midnight Train to Georgia".
- Deng Xiaoping (February 19, 1976) – Provides Duke his official welcome as envoy to China and appears again from time to time. (Referred to as "Teng Hsiao-Ping", as he was known in the United States at the time, before Pinyin romanization came into common use.)
- Mao Zedong (March 3, 1976 – June 3, 1976).
- Steven Weed (March 10, 1976) – Fiancé of Patty Hearst. (Referred to as "Stephen".)
- Jay "Wah Wah" Graydon (August 5, 1976) – Grammy-winning LA-area musician. Appeared as guitar side-man for Jimmy Thudpucker.
- Amy Carter (September 7, 1976) – Daughter of the President.
- Phyllis Schlafly (December 23, 1977) – Opposed the ERA in a debate with Joanie, who was substituting for Lacey.
- David Halberstam (July 26, 1979) – Pulitzer-winning journalist and author. Interviews Rick for a book he's writing on "the giants of journalism".
- Robert Vesco (November 22, 1984) - Duke invites his former college roommate to speak at the inauguration of the Baby Doc School of Medicine.
- Donald Trump – The New York City real-estate mogul and 45th President of the United States has appeared in Doonesbury strips since the 1980s. In 2016, Andrews McMeel Publishing published Yuge, a collection of Trudeau's strips depicting Trump.
- Clint Eastwood (March 3, 1986) – Shown at the edge of the frame, by a boot and leg in denim. First of six strips mostly concerned with Eastwood's campaign for Mayor of Carmel, California.
- Frank Sinatra – Appears not only in cartoon form but in actual photos reprinted in the strip showing him consorting with various mobsters.
- Bill Casey (August 24, 1987 – August 29, 1987).
- Evan Mecham (September 7, 1987 – December 9, 1987).
- Al Gore (February 15, 1988 – February 20, 1988) introduces him to the American public as part of the 1988 Presidential campaign.
- Elvis Presley (August 29, 1988) – Turns out not to be dead. He is found as a stowaway on the Trump Princess, and claims to have been held aboard a UFO in the intervening years.
- Michael Dukakis (November 1, 1988).
- Jesse Helms (August 9, 1992) – as a shadow in Mr. Butts' dream, which is itself inside Mike Doonesbury's dream
- Michael Milken (November 16, 1993) – teaching his class at UCLA to recite the three principles of the Milken Code: Greed Works, Crime Pays, Everybody Does It.
- Arianna and Michael Huffington (October 6, 1994) – appear as California residents while Michael runs for senate. Michael is drawn as an empty suit.
- Rupert Murdoch (January 15, 2003) – off screen, saying he is not buying the strip.
- Sarah Palin (July 23, 2010) – Roland Hedley informs the former governor of Alaska that he is stalking her stalker.
- David Petraeus (September 12, 2010) – partial silhouette.
- Warren Buffett (September 23, 2010).
- Roger Ailes (September 8, 2011).
- Mitt Romney (October 8, 2012 – October 13, 2012) – The young Mitt Romney was depicted as a Mormon missionary in France in 1968.
- Alexandria Ocasio-Cortez (August 4, 2019).
- Melania Trump (October 13, 2019)
