= Lacey Davenport =

Publication information
- Publisher: Universal Press Syndicate
- Created by: Garry Trudeau

Lacey Davenport is a fictional character in Garry Trudeau's comic strip Doonesbury. She is often said to be based on Millicent Fenwick, a Republican member of Congress from New Jersey, although Trudeau has denied this link.

She and Dick Davenport, her husband, were first introduced as attendees at a Walden College Alumni Reunion in 1974. The two had been "living in sin" for decades, and finally decided to get married. Lacey later became a major character when she ran as the Republican candidate for a seat in the United States House of Representatives in the mid-1970s, serving a district comprising the San Francisco Bay Area. Her opponents in the election were Virginia "Ginny" Slade, who ran as an independent, and the incumbent, Congressman Ventura, the Democratic nominee.

For a while the race was close, but with Lacey and Ginny fighting over votes, their mutual opponent (whom they both found to be highly immoral) was unifying his support and coming out ahead. Deciding that anything was better than having him win, and that Lacey was more qualified than herself, Ginny dropped out of the race and supported Lacey, who won. Lacey was challenged again for her seat in Congress in 1986 by Clyde, who had been Ginny's boyfriend, and later her husband. Davenport won re-election.

Dick Davenport, a bird watcher, died in 1986 due to a massive coronary brought on by observing the possibly extinct Bachman's warbler, managing to snap a photo before collapsing. This death scene has been noted as a particularly memorable one.

In many ways, Lacey represented Trudeau's idea of a perfect politician. Although she was a member of the Republican Party, and was fiscally quite conservative, she was nevertheless a very liberal character at heart. Although she was very wealthy and traveled in the highest social circles, Lacey's devotion to her constituents was unbreakable. In some ways, she seemed naive to how dishonest her colleagues in Congress could be. In 1990, she announced she was resigning over the Savings and Loan crisis, in order to set an example. Instead of following her lead, most assumed she was dying. Only after the elections that same year did Lacey return to Congress, winning the election as a write-in candidate.

The personal loyalty she inspired was demonstrated in other ways as well. Joanie Caucus went to work for her after graduation and stayed in her employ for many years, even though she was a die hard Democrat. After a discussion with Joanie, Lacey retired from Congress in 1997 after serving many years. By this time she was suffering from Alzheimer's disease, and could scarcely remember any recent events. She mistook a homeless woman, Alice P. Schwarzman, for her late sister Pearl, and ended up willing all her money to her.

Lacey herself died in 1998. Lacey's spirit was collected by her late husband, and he led her to heaven. Since then she has made sporadic ghostly appearances.
