= Joanie Caucus =

Publication information
- Publisher: Universal Press Syndicate
- Created by: Garry Trudeau

Joanie Caucus is a fictional character in Garry Trudeau's comic strip Doonesbury.

She first appeared in September 1972 in which she has a fight with her husband, Clinton, over her rights as a woman. She finds that her recently acquired feminist beliefs clash with his idea of how a wife should behave, and she promptly walks out on him and her two children. She catches a ride with Mike Doonesbury and Mark Slackmeyer, who happen to be traveling cross-country on motorcycle at the time, and travels with them back to Walden Commune.

There she spends several years living with the other characters while running a day-care service for local children (whose parents often aren't too thrilled when their little girls come home talking about Women's Rights). While running Walden Day Care, Caucus sends off applications to several real-life law schools (whose actual students petitioned the schools to accept her as a student). She eventually receives her J.D. from University of California, Berkeley School of Law in the class of 1977, and moves to California. She shares an apartment with Ginny Slade while there, and helps Ginny in an unsuccessful bid for the United States Congress.

After becoming a lawyer, Joanie spends many years working for Congresswoman Lacey Davenport, and marries Rick Redfern, a reporter with the Washington Post. She also reconnects with her daughter J.J., whom she hasn't seen since leaving her family. Joanie feels intensely guilty over this, but she and J.J. eventually reconcile.

Joanie later works for the Justice Department, is an aide during the Clinton Presidency, and has since gone into private practice. In the 1980s she gives birth to Jeff Redfern while in Lamaze class.

Joanie is one of the more down to earth characters of the strip. She had an almost maternal relationship with the others at the commune, and appears to have moderate political beliefs. She works for Davenport despite the fact that Lacey is a Republican and Joanie is a Democrat, considering that Lacey's upstanding character is more important than her politics.

On March 3, 1974, Joanie, applying to law school, gives her birthdate as July 21, 1935 but in a January 2009 appearance, Joanie describes herself as a 70-year-old retired civil servant born in 1938. She and Rick Redfern still live in Washington DC.

Starting in the fall 2011 Joanie worked as volunteer coordinator for the real-live candidate Elizabeth Warren's campaign to unseat Massachusetts Senator Scott Brown. On Feb. 6, 2013, Joanie points out to Rick that her granddaughter's pregnancy means that Joanie's going to be a great-grandmother.
