= Mike Doonesbury =

Publication information
- Publisher: Universal Press Syndicate
- Created by: Garry Trudeau

Michael James "Mike" Doonesbury is the main character in Garry Trudeau's comic strip Doonesbury. He started out as a nerdish freshman from Tulsa at the fictional Walden College, and shared a dorm room with B.D. Currently he is married to Kim Rosenthal, and divorced from J.J. Caucus. Mike's daughter, Alex continued to live with Mike and Kim, until she left to attend MIT. He has a younger brother, Benjamin (who during some time as a punk rocker was known as "Sal Putrid"), and a widowed mother who died in late 2010.

Mike is a fairly normal, well-adjusted individual to whom most readers can relate, in contrast to the often surreal, crazy and extreme characters that populate the strip. Trudeau based Mike's personality on his own and for this reason it is usually Mike who speaks the creator's own viewpoints. Mike's name was taken from the word "doone", meaning a person who is not afraid to appear foolish, and Charles Pillsbury, Trudeau's roommate at Yale.

== History ==
In the early strips (from 1970), his primary traits were his inability to hit it off with any girl, and his refusal to admit his lack of success with women. Mike was initially set as a "preppy" counterpoint to his college roommate, B.D., a stereotypical jock. The role as B.D.'s foil soon shifted to the more radical Mark Slackmeyer, and the hippie Zonker Harris. He also talked to his own reflection in the mirror (and was frequently insulted by it) and was even able to talk to plants on some occasions (although it was generally Zonker who talked to the plants). During this period he had a sister who appeared once (on February 21, 1971), but she were silently dropped from subsequent continuity. He also tutored a young African American boy named Rufus.

After a couple of years on campus, he moved to Walden Commune, along with B.D., Zonker, Mark, Nicole, Boopsie, Didi, Bernie and Joanie.

In the Doonesbury musical that ran during the strip's hiatus in 1983–84, he graduated from Walden and married Joanie's daughter, J.J. By the time the strip picked up again, he had started and then dropped out of business school, but this was not shown.

After this, Mike took a career in advertising in New York City at the World Trade Center, and frequently found that the jobs he was assigned to violated his values and caused him a great deal of moral anguish over whether he should take the job or rebel. These assignments included selling Ronald Reagan to black voters and the creation of a new mascot for the tobacco industry. The latter caused him to have disturbing dreams, which came to life in the form of Mr. Butts, who occasionally haunts Mike's dreams to this day. Despite his qualms about his work, he usually accepted the tasks he was given, as he was too timid and too worried about finding another job to resist.

Mike's marriage was rocky from the beginning, and only got worse as time went on. He was down to earth and sensible, and J.J.'s "artistic" behavior became increasingly erratic. The two had trouble relating to each other, and he was almost tempted into an affair with Nicole. He relented at the last moment when J.J. revealed that she was pregnant. She gave birth to Alex Doonesbury in 1988. This temporarily saved their relationship, but they ended up divorced in 1996, after J.J. had an affair with Zeke Brenner that was inspired by the novel The Bridges of Madison County.

After his stint as an ad-man, Mike found himself unemployed for an extended period of time, and became increasingly desperate. Eventually he landed a dream job working for Bernie's software company, moved from New York to Seattle, and met Kim Rosenthal, a brilliant and beautiful computer programmer who, despite being many years his junior, fell for him. They have been married since 1997, and have started their own company, Mikim Inc. They now run MyVulture.com, an internet business that buys and sells overstock from other, failed, internet ventures.

Like many people, Mike knew someone who died in the World Trade Center attacks. His former boss, Mr. Bellows, was killed and Mike flew out to attend the funeral. He felt extremely guilty because he hadn't actually liked Bellows very much, and the feelings of guilt increased when Mike learned that Bellows had acted heroically during the attacks.

Politically, Mike started out as a very liberal Democrat, campaigning for George McGovern in 1972. In 1980 he supported independent candidate John B. Anderson. In 1994 he became a Republican, supporting Steve Forbes and later Bob Dole for president. He since has expressed views that reveal him as being more moderate-leaning-to-conservative. However, he did vote for Barack Obama in 2008. During the 2016 elections, he stated that he would not be voting for Donald Trump.

=== Mike's Summer Daydreams ===
One of the strip's traditions is Mike's Annual Summer Daydream. Once a year starting in the 1990s, a week of strips during the summer is devoted to him fantasizing about how he feels things should be. The daydreams sometimes cross over into actual plotlines: in 1995 Mike dreamed that he was being offered a fantastic job from Bernie, and was suddenly informed that due to a mix-up this was actually happening.
