= Zonker Harris =

Publication information
- Publisher: Universal Press Syndicate
- Created by: Garry Trudeau

Zonker Harris (his full name is revealed in Doonesbury: A Musical Comedy to be Edgar Zonker Harris) is the stereotypical unfocused confused hippie character in Garry Trudeau's comic strip Doonesbury. He made his first appearance as a perennial pot-smoking pest plaguing B.D.'s football team in 1971. He moved with Mike, B.D., and the gang to a rural commune (named Walden in homage to Thoreau's 19th century idyll).

== Family ==
Zonker's family consists of his mother, father, "Uncle" Duke, his nephew Zipper, and his sister, Louise. His mother and father have a habit of fighting, which leads to the mother leaving for a short time to clear her head (but always returning in time to water the plants). Whenever this happens, Zonker's father becomes upset and visits Zonker, within minutes of the argument. Although Zonker's sister never appears in the series, she is the mother of Zipper Harris, Zonker's nephew.

Zonker's ancestors from Colonial America are mentioned several times in the series. Nathan Harris was a minuteman (who could literally be ready in one minute) as well as an activist for civil rights and was responsible for "freeing" a nearby slave (who was under the impression that they were in Virginia, where slavery was still legal. They were, in fact, in Massachusetts). Nathan's wife, Amy Harris, was equally revolutionary, fighting for women's equality in the Constitution and taking up an apprenticeship with Paul Revere to become a silversmith. Neither cause worked out very well however, as men were not interested in women's civil rights and she was unable to even cast simple pewter tankards. She quits her apprenticeship when Nathan assures her that he needs her as a companion and equal as well as a wife.

== History ==
While at Walden Commune, Zonker spent most of his time watching TV, getting high, and swimming around in a minuscule body of water called "Walden Puddle", which he considered to be a sacred and holy place. In his early years in the strip, Zonker had the ability to talk to plants. (Mike also talked to the plants during Zonker's stint as Lieutenant Governor of American Samoa.) In later stories, Zonker appeared to lose this ability, but it has sprung back up occasionally, and he has been seen conversing with a marijuana plant, and a scrawny Christmas tree in recent years. Other than these few exceptions, this power seems to have left him, and he misses it terribly. When wondering out loud why he had it in the first place, he was told "It was the drugs, man". Ironically, it was a plant that informed him of this.

Zonker is habitually unemployed, and is very protective of his slacker lifestyle. He has taken on temporary jobs as a bartender and a postman, but always leaves these careers as soon as he gets bored with them. The only "work" to which he has shown any diligence is acquiring a suntan. Throughout the 1980s, he spent more and more of his time trying to develop "the perfect tan", and even became a celebrity (on par with a professional athlete) for his accomplishments, with George Hamilton as his idol. Eventually he wised up to the damage the sun was doing to his skin, and has since appeared in public service announcements about sun safety.

After his graduation from Walden, Zonker eventually enrolled in "The Baby Doc College of Physicians" (which was run by Uncle Duke, an old family friend). However, he dropped out after winning $23 million from a lottery ticket. Shortly afterward, he had to spend most of it on saving Duke from being a zombified slave, but had enough left over to buy a British title (His Lordship the Viscount St. Austell-in-the-Moor Biggleswade-Brixham), which caused him to be called to England as a tie-breaker for a vote in the House of Lords over one of Margaret Thatcher's tax bills. He stayed at another lord's castle for several months, oblivious to many not-so-subtle hints to leave, and was eventually forcibly removed by a butler. He ended up as a live-in nanny for Mike and J.J. Doonesbury (who kicked him out in the early 1990s).

== Lifestyle ==
Zonker spent several years as a live-in babysitter for B.D. and Boopsie's daughter Samantha in Connecticut. As they live on the former Walden Commune, Zonker was reunited with his beloved puddle. He contributed to the household by working at McFriendly's, apparently a portmanteau of McDonald's and Friendly's restaurants.

In 2012, with the legalization of marijuana in Colorado, Zonker and his nephew Zipper began to conceive a plan to move to Boulder and start a marijuana farm. They did this in early 2014.

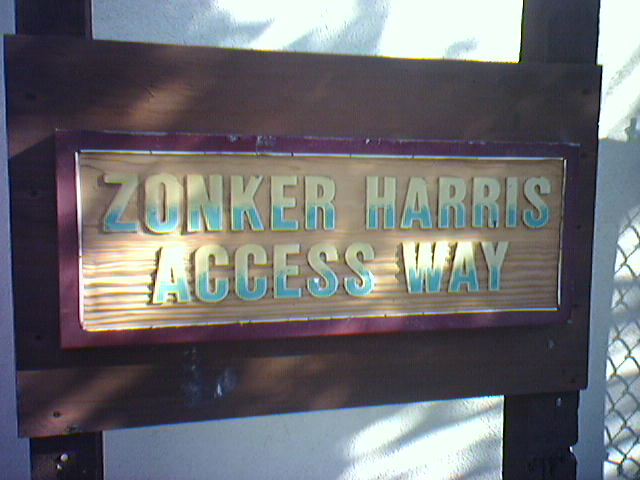
The Zonker Harris Access Way in Malibu, CA

Occasionally he travels back to his birthplace of California to commune with "Old Surfer Dude", an elderly man who preaches the virtues of the surfer lifestyle in a style reminiscent of both a kung fu master and Yoda. He has been in conflict for many years with David Geffen for denying the public access to his beaches, in conflict with California law. Geffen finally relented in 2005. There is an access way in Malibu named after Zonker.

Zonker is entirely uninterested in sex and romance and has never pursued a romantic relationship. He claims that this is because his heart was broken by a girl when he was ten years old, and that this convinced him that love was not worth the trouble.

Zonker often supports political causes that are out of the mainstream. Zonker voted for Ross Perot in 1992 and worked for his Uncle Duke's 2000 presidential campaign. In a March 2010 strip, he told a Tea Party supporter that he has "always stuck it to the man".

Wesleyan University students hold an unofficial yearly event in April called Zonker Harris Day, celebrating psychedelic music and culture, with the Doonesbury character as a mascot. MGMT are among the acts to have performed at Zonker Harris Day: in 2003, while the members were undergraduates at Wesleyan, the band performed a set including a version of their later hit "Kids". In early 2008, the new Wesleyan University president, Michael S. Roth, declared Zonker Harris Day to be "stupid", and the Residential Life office officially opposed its "hippie-druggie" image. Funding for the event was banned pending a new title. After prolonged disagreement, students renamed the event "Ze Who Shall Not Be Named Day". With a new name, the former Zonker Harris Day was held as usual on April 19, 2008. The students protested what they viewed to be unnecessary and irrelevant censorship, while the administration maintained that Zonker Harris Day gave the university a poor image. A series of strips in late 2010 parodied this, with Zonker (having been told of the event's renaming) debating whether or not to personally intervene, especially in light of the major conflict on his calendar in April – the Royal Wedding of Prince William. In 2011, the name of the festival was reinstated.

The University of Miami named the scout team the Zonkers.

== References and in-jokes ==
- Named after Steven "Zonker" Lambrecht, one of the Merry Pranksters described in Tom Wolfe's The Electric Kool-Aid Acid Test
- In the LucasArts computer game Monkey Island 2: LeChuck's Revenge, Guybrush Threepwood – now sporting a long ponytail and a beard – attends a fancy dress party at Elaine Marley's mansion on Booty Island, attired in a dress. If the player makes him look in Elaine's mirror, Guybrush says "Hey, it's Zonker Harris in a dress!"
- The flavor of Ben & Jerry's named "Doonesberry", both a pun and tribute to the strip, shows Zonker mixing the ice cream in place of the standard pictures of Ben & Jerry.
