= Uncle Duke =

Publication information
- Publisher: Universal Press Syndicate
- Created by: Garry Trudeau

Uncle Duke is a fictional character in the comic strip Doonesbury by Garry Trudeau. He is nominally Zonker Harris's uncle, albeit an "uncle by courtesy" only. Duke appeared in the strip July 1974 and was originally a straightforward caricature of the gonzo journalist Hunter S. Thompson (see Raoul Duke), but eventually took on a life of his own and a succession of ill-fated ventures in the areas of politics, business and crime.

Duke is an epic consumer of drugs and alcohol and an amoral trickster with a fondness for firearms. He has a son called Earl who resembles him in most ways but is sober and more intelligent.

== Character biography ==
Duke's early life is murky. His mother is mentioned very few times in the strip; a flashback has her noting at Duke's college graduation that "one of three men I used to know would be very proud of you." He recalls having been born wearing Ray Bans, and is almost never seen without sunglasses in the strip. As Jim Andrews calls him a "42-year old balding bagman" in the strip for 6 July 1979, his birthyear could be 1936 or 1937. He tells Earl that he does not remember where he attended high school. He mentions to Honey that he fought in the Belgian Congo to pay for college. While in Haiti, he is visited by his former college roommate, Robert Vesco.

Despite Zonker calling him "Uncle Duke", Duke appears to be his surname, shared by his son Earl and his cousin David. The back matter for the Doonesbury collection "Death of a Party Animal" refers to him as "Raoul Duke," a throwback to the character's origins. Conversely, in one exposé of his past, he is revealed to have no last name.

In early strips, Duke and others would occasionally mention his wife, Sandy, and she makes a brief "appearance" (only her dialogue is shown, as is often the case in the comic strip) in several strips during a visit by Duke to their home in Colorado. Later, Duke forgets to bring her when he goes to his appointed posts in Samoa and China. When he finally returns home, his caretaker informs him that "She left years ago". They eventually divorced.

=== 1970s ===
Since his first appearance in the strip, Duke has assumed many career hats, each more outlandish than the last. When first introduced, Duke was working as a writer under Jann Wenner for Rolling Stone magazine, much to Wenner's chagrin and aggravation over Duke's inability to meet deadlines and/or maintain coherence within the confines of his articles, which were often written with the aid of controlled substances. His Hunter S. Thompson comparisons are fairly evident in this beginning, as the first strip to feature him has him drunk and high on tequila and coke, attempting to kill invisible bats with a ruler.

While still on the staff of Rolling Stone, Duke applied for the position of Governor of American Samoa, and to his—and everyone else's—surprise, was actually appointed to the post by the United States Senate. Duke's tenure as governor was marked by a series of consecutive natural disasters, culminating in Duke himself instigating a hostage crisis.

Despite Duke's gross incompetence, he earned the favor of then-President Gerald Ford and was appointed as the United States Ambassador to the People's Republic of China, a role for which Duke claimed to be perfectly suited due to his being "good with minorities". (In fact, the United States had no ambassador to mainland China at that time.) His tenure was largely uneventful and mostly consisted of his abusing his authority for personal gain and wagering with other members of the diplomatic community (notably the British ambassador) over the purging of various Chinese officials. During his time in China, he was assisted by interpreter Honey Huan, who developed an unrequited obsession with him, followed him to the US and became his much-abused sidekick for the next 30 years.

Recalled by the newly elected Jimmy Carter in 1977, Duke briefly worked as a laetrile farmer before being appointed as the manager of the Washington Redskins, ostensibly for his experience in "sports medicine" i.e. performance-enhancing drugs. After his activities were exposed by a concerned whistleblower, Duke fled Washington in a hail of bullets.

=== 1980s ===
Shortly after his departure from the Redskins, Duke was hired as a lobbyist for the National Rifle Association, owing to his borderline paraphilic love for firearms and gun violence. His role consisted chiefly of threatening members of Congress with write-in campaigns. He was next hired by oil executive Jim Andrews to parachute into Iran and bribe a government accountant for oil rights. The mission went disastrously wrong and Duke accidentally triggered the real-life Iran hostage crisis.

Upon his return to the US, Duke made a living for a while as a former hostage on the lecture circuit, then went on the run again after accidentally shooting his caretaker Zeke Brenner. With Honey's help, Duke bought a fishing boat in Florida and began to smuggle drugs and illegal immigrants. This new career move was cut short by an ill-timed sightseeing cruise to the Falkland Islands to witness the war. After running the boat into a reef, Duke and Honey suffered a mutiny at the hands of their own cruise passengers, and ended up shipwrecked for months on what they believed to be a deserted island in the South Atlantic but turned out to be Matagorda Island, a few miles off the coast of Texas.

Upon returning to the mainland, Duke became entangled in Hollywood politics, encountering "superagent" Sid Kibbitz. Kibbitz represented Duke in negotiations for a John DeLorean biopic project entitled Fast Lanes, White Lines. In order to secure funding for the film, Duke became a cocaine dealer and was shortly thereafter arrested after trying to deal drugs with men who turned out to be federal agents.

While the strip was on hiatus from January 1983 to October 1984, the characters lived on in a Broadway production entitled Doonesbury: A Musical Comedy. Duke was found guilty of drug-dealing, sentenced to five years' probation, and required by the court to open and manage a drug rehabilitation center for that period. At the end of the musical, Duke's efforts to seize the Walden Commune so it could be razed and the land used for the rehab center were thwarted, and Trudeau has stated in interviews and on the official website FAQ that both Duke and Honey were forced to flee the country afterwards.

Back in the strip, Duke opened the Baby Doc College of Offshore Medicine in Haiti, a grossly fraudulent medical school which was not above hosting a designer drug conference. One morning, Duke was discovered by Honey looking "more inert than usual" and pronounced dead, prompting the St. Petersburg Times to run a full obituary in real life. However, a few days after his funeral, it was discovered that Duke had been zombified, dug out and taken into slavery by the deposed tyrant Jean-Claude "Baby Doc" Duvalier, who renamed him Légume ("vegetable"). After reporter Rick Redfern recognized him during an interview of Duvalier, Zonker Harris bought "Légume"'s freedom using most of a recently acquired lottery fortune. Duke remained hairless for several years following his zombie period.

Back on his feet, Duke founded the Dr. Whoopee condom company to cash in on AIDS-induced panic, but lost control of it following a bad financial deal with John Gotti. After being briefly committed, he resurfaced as captain of Donald Trump's executive cruise ship, the Trump Princess. During Duke's captaincy, Honey returned to Beijing for a college reunion, which led to her inadvertent involvement in the Tiananmen Square protests of 1989. Seeking refuge in the U.S. embassy after being named one of China's "25 most-wanted hooligans", Honey attracted the attention of Trump, who offered a million-dollar reward for her recovery as a "symbol of freedom". Financial inducement succeeding where personal loyalty failed, Duke smuggled Honey out of China by marrying her, causing her delusions about their relationship to reach new levels. They divorced soon after.

At the decade's end, Duke was tapped by President George H. W. Bush to serve as Maximum Proconsul in post-invasion Panama.

=== 1990s ===
The first Gulf War found Duke smuggling arms to the underground resistance in Kuwait, then opening Club Scud, a popular wartime watering hole in Kuwait City. After working on David Duke's campaign, he began selling doctored photos of the John F. Kennedy assassination in Dallas, Texas, to conspiracy theorists.

After the Republican revolution of 1994 Duke appealed to Speaker Newt Gingrich to help him open a low budget, privatized orphanage in Aspen called "Nothin' But Orphans". This resulted in the discovery of an illegitimate son called Earl, who shares his father's extreme views and absence of morality. Abandoning the orphans and Honey, father and son lived in a trailer park in Las Vegas, gaming and trafficking in stolen Beanie Babies.

Duke also spent some time in the early nineties as a bodyguard for Oliver North. North was slow to trust him, but Duke soon became a key part of his security during his campaign for senator in Virginia. The public office bug soon became a key part of Duke's increasingly megalomaniacal psyche.

Duke also found work as a bounty hunter, apprehending Zeke Brenner for jumping bail with the assistance of Earl.

=== 2000 and beyond ===
Duke ran for the White House after a short stretch as a key advisor to Minnesota Governor Jesse Ventura. His campaign, headquartered in a motel in Coon Rapids, Minnesota, was a resounding failure, despite corporate sponsorships by heavy hitters Lipton Tea and Absolut Vodka. (Through the magic of motion capture technology, Duke was able to announce his candidacy in the real world on Larry King Live.) A successful business trafficking in stem cells was followed by a lucrative involvement in the messy fallout from the Enron scandal.

In March 2005, following the suicide of Hunter S. Thompson, the strip ran a tribute, with Uncle Duke lamenting the death of the man he called his "inspiration". The first of these strips featured a panel with artwork similar to that of Ralph Steadman, who illustrated several of Thompson's works, including his 1971 novel Fear and Loathing in Las Vegas.

During the U.S. occupation of Iraq, Duke installed himself as mayor of the (fictional) Iraqi city of Al Amok by exploiting a power base of looters. In late September 2005, he, having been robbed of his new fortune, relocated to New Orleans, Louisiana, to profit from the reconstruction efforts after hurricanes Katrina and Rita. There, after years of verbal abuse and neglect, Honey finally left Duke's employ, though they would later cross paths again.

Duke was then contacted by his son, now a successful "K Street lobbyist" in Washington, D.C., and joined his firm as a partner. The pair lobby first in favor of Native American tribes, then the repressive regime of "Greater Berzerkistan", a fictitious Central Asian country with a genocidal and megalomaniacal dictator called Trff Bmzklfrpz. During summer 2010 he also served as a mouthpiece for BP in conjunction with the Gulf oil leak.

== Hunter S. Thompson's reaction ==
Author and gonzo journalist Hunter S. Thompson, the obvious inspiration for Trudeau's Uncle Duke character (Thompson originally wrote Fear and Loathing in Las Vegas under the pseudonym Raoul Duke; in a short sequence of Doonesbury strips, Uncle Duke desires to write a memoir about his shoplifting conviction, entitled, "Fear And Loathing at Macy's Menswear") said in numerous interviews that he was irritated and unhappy with the characterization. After being questioned about his reaction to the character during a 1977 lecture at the University of Colorado at Boulder, Thompson commented that "some people grow up and want to be firemen, and some want to be president; nobody wants to grow up and be a cartoon character". He repeatedly stated that his anonymity as a journalist and his privacy as a citizen were lost "largely due to our friend Trudeau," and said he had no desire to meet Trudeau "because I might set the little bastard on fire." The two men apparently never did meet face to face. Toward the end of his life, Thompson reportedly told friends he had "made peace" with the Duke character, and it no longer bothered him.
