= Mark Slackmeyer =

Publication information
- Publisher: Universal Press Syndicate
- Created by: Garry Trudeau

Mark Sheldon Slackmeyer is a character in the comic strip Doonesbury.

== Character biography ==
Mark starts out as a radical at Walden College, and leads several peace rallies (in his first appearance, he referred to himself as "'Megaphone' Mark Slackmeyer"). The character was initially modeled after a Yale undergraduate activist, Mark Zanger. Mark seized the office of Walden's President King twice (he considers the first time a failure as President King was far too cooperative), and in 1972 took a cross-country trip with Michael Doonesbury to Washington, and eventually to that year's Republican National Convention in Miami, Florida.

Mark gives up his radical ideas and becomes the college radio personality at Walden, going by the moniker "'Marvelous' Mark". His father, Phil Slackmeyer, goes to the college for a reunion, and is astounded that his son is taking fewer business classes so he can become a radio man. However, Mark has never really cared about his father's positions on things (having referred to his father as a "fascist" in early strips). They have always simply agreed to disagree. After graduating (in Doonesbury: A Musical Comedy, where his full name is revealed to be Mark Sheldon Slackmeyer), Mark goes to work for NPR, where he is sometimes referred to as "'Microphone' Mark". In September 2025, Mark's long-running radio show is canceled due budget cuts to the Corporation for Public Broadcasting. Mark subsequently begins a podcast called 'Rolling with the Bros,' focusing on the phenomenon of bro culture and its political ramifications. His views remain liberal, but are less extreme than they were in early years (in which he even seemed to have communist leanings). Jewish by birth, Mark could now be best described as a secular humanist.

One of Mark's most famous appearances was on the May 29, 1973, strip published during the Watergate scandal, in which Mark proclaimed that Attorney General John N. Mitchell was "Guilty! Guilty, Guilty, Guilty!!" Mark later did the same to describe Ronald Reagan, John Poindexter, and Oliver North in a strip written during the Iran–Contra affair. The original image from 1973 also returned as a flashback after the death of Richard Nixon in 1994 (with Mark's words crossed out and replaced with "Flawed! Flawed, Flawed, Flawed!!" to parody the rehabilitation of Nixon's reputation) and in 2017 during the Special Counsel investigation of President Donald Trump.

Andy Lippincott, who died of AIDS, came down from heaven as an angel in a "dream sequence" to tell Mark that he is gay. (Mark was portrayed as heterosexual in the 1970s, though without much in the way of actual relationships.) Mark eventually publicly comes out, and forms a relationship with a gay political conservative named Chase. The two are united in a ceremony in Pago Pago, American Samoa by MacArthur, one-time assistant to then-Governor Duke. However, the two of them have more recently decided that they are not very happy with their relationship, and are thinking of getting a divorce, but are unable due to no documentation of the marriage taking place. In early 2007, Mark was forced out of the house by his partner Chase and began bitter rants of him on his radio show. He has since reconciled somewhat with Chase, and has had him on his radio show and podcast since their divorce. They are friendly, but not "together".

He has recently allowed his advancing age to show by "ceasing to dye" his hair brown, and is now grey-haired.

== See also ==
- List of characters in Doonesbury
