= Doonesbury =

Comic strip by Garry Trudeau

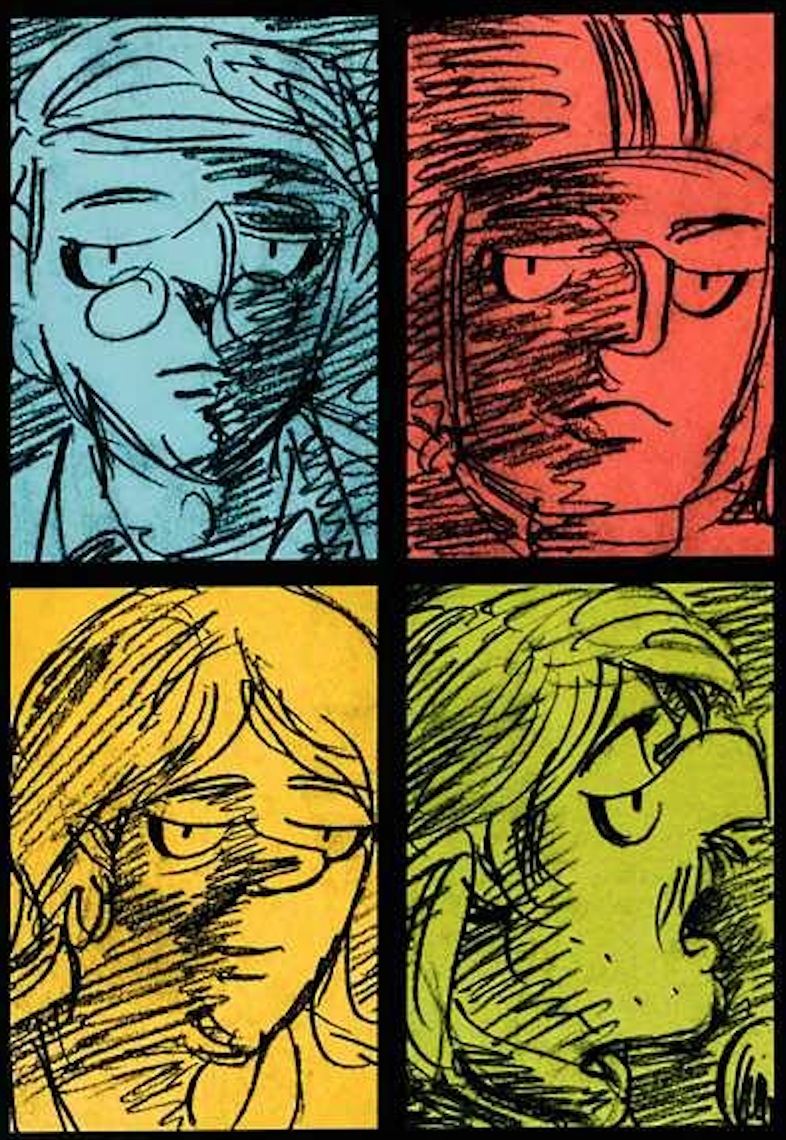
- Author: Garry Trudeau
- Website: doonesbury.com
- Current status/schedule: Sunday only (repeat strips through the week)
- Launch date: October 26, 1970; 56 years ago
- Syndicate: Universal Press Syndicate/Andrews McMeel Syndication
- Genre(s): Humor, politics, satire
- Preceded by: Bull Tales

Doonesbury is a comic strip by American cartoonist Garry Trudeau that chronicles the adventures and lives of an array of characters of various ages, professions, and backgrounds, from the President of the United States to the title character, Mike Doonesbury, who has progressed over the decades from a college student to a youthful senior citizen.

Created in "the throes of '60s and '70s counterculture", and frequently political in nature, Doonesbury features characters representing a range of affiliations, but the cartoon is noted for a liberal viewpoint. The name "Doonesbury" is a combination of the word doone (American prep school slang for someone who is clueless, inattentive, or careless) and the surname of Charles Pillsbury, Trudeau's roommate at Yale University.

Doonesbury is written and penciled by Garry Trudeau, then inked and lettered by an assistant, Don Carlton, then Todd Pound. Sunday strips are colored by George Corsillo. Doonesbury was a daily strip through most of its existence, but since February 2014 it has run repeat strips Monday through Saturday, and new strips on Sunday.

== History ==
=== Origin ===
The first Doonesbury cartoon, from October 26, 1970

Doonesbury began as a continuation of Bull Tales, which appeared in the Yale University student newspaper, the Yale Daily News, from 1968 to 1970. It focused on local campus events at Yale.

Doonesbury proper debuted as a daily strip in twenty-eight newspapers on October 26, 1970 (it being the first strip from Universal Press Syndicate). A Sunday strip began on March 21, 1971. Many of the early strips were reprints of the Bull Tales cartoons, with some changes to the drawings and plots. B. D.'s helmet changed from having a "Y" (for Yale) to a star (for the fictional Walden College). Mike and B. D. started Doonesbury as roommates; they were not roommates in Bull Tales.

Doonesbury became known for its social and political commentary. By the 2010s, it was syndicated in approximately 1,400 newspapers worldwide.

In May 1975, Doonesbury became the first daily comic strip to win a Pulitzer Prize, taking the award for Editorial Cartooning. That year, U.S. President Gerald Ford told the Radio and Television Correspondents' Association at their annual dinner, "There are only three major vehicles to keep us informed as to what is going on in Washington: the electronic media, the print media, and Doonesbury, not necessarily in that order."

A panel from the a Doonesbury "Stonewall" strip, referring to the Watergate scandal, from August 12, 1974; awarded the Pulitzer Prize

=== 1983–1984 hiatus ===
Trudeau took a 22-month hiatus, from January 2, 1983, to September 30, 1984. Before the break in the strip, the characters were eternal college students, living in a commune together near Walden College, which was modeled after Trudeau's alma mater, Yale. During the break, Trudeau helped create a Broadway musical of the strip, showing the graduation of the main characters. The Broadway adaptation opened at the Biltmore Theatre on November 21, 1983, and played 104 performances. Elizabeth Swados composed the music for Trudeau's book and lyrics.

=== After the hiatus ===
The strip resumed some time after the events in the musical, with further changes having taken place after the end of the musical's plot. Mike, Mark, Zonker, B.D., and Boopsie were all now graduates; B.D. and Boopsie were living in Malibu, California, where B.D. was a third-string quarterback for the Los Angeles Rams, and Boopsie was making a living from walk-on and cameo roles. Mark was living in Washington, D.C., working for National Public Radio. Michael and J.J. had gotten married, and Mike had dropped out of business school to start work in an advertising agency in New York City. Zonker, still not ready for the "real world", was living with Mike and J.J. until he was accepted as a medical student at his Uncle Duke's "Baby Doc College" in Haiti.

Prior to the hiatus, the strip's characters had aged only slightly. But when Trudeau returned to Doonesbury, the characters began to age in something close to real time, as in Gasoline Alley and For Better or for Worse, Since then, the main characters' ages and career developments have tracked those of standard media portrayals of baby boomers, with jobs in advertising, law enforcement, and the dot-com boom. Current events are mirrored through the original characters, their offspring (the "second generation"), and occasional new characters.

Garry Trudeau received the National Cartoonist Society Newspaper Comic Strip Award for 1994, and their Reuben Award for 1995 for his work on the strip.

=== Alpha House, hiatuses, and Sunday only: 2013–present ===
Doonesbury's syndicate, Universal Uclick, announced on May 29, 2013, that the comic strip would go on hiatus from June 10 to Labor Day of that year while Garry Trudeau worked on his streaming video comedy Alpha House, which was picked up by Amazon Studios. "Doonesbury Flashbacks" were offered during those weeks, but due to the unusually long hiatus, some newspapers opted to run different comic strips instead. Sunday strips returned as scheduled, but the daily strip's hiatus was extended until November 2013.

After Alpha House was renewed for a second season in February 2014, Trudeau announced that he would now produce only Sunday strips for the foreseeable future. Since March 3, 2014, the strip has offered reruns starting from the very beginning of its history as opposed to more recent ones that re-run when Trudeau is on vacation. Also in 2014, the site at doonesbury.com moved under washingtonpost.com, and since then it redirects to the latter. Alpha House was cancelled in 2016, but Trudeau did not return to drawing Monday-to-Saturday strips, and continued his Sunday-only schedule.

In a 2018 interview with Rolling Stone, Trudeau said that while Donald Trump appears in only a limited number of strips, "for the last two years, he's been subtext in almost all of them."

=== TV special ===
In 1977, Trudeau wrote a script for a 26-minute animated special, A Doonesbury Special, which was produced and directed by Trudeau along with John Hubley (who died during the storyboarding stage) and Faith Hubley. The special was first broadcast by NBC on November 27, 1977. It won a Special Jury Award at the Cannes International Film Festival for best short film, and received an Oscar nomination (for best animated short film), both in 1978. Voice actors for the special included Barbara Harris, William Sloane Coffin Jr., Jack Gilford and Will Jordan. Also included were "Stop in the Middle" and "I Do Believe", two songs "sung" by the character Jimmy Thudpucker, also part of the "Special". While the compositions and performances were credited to "Jimmy Thudpucker", they were in fact co-written and sung by James Allen "Jimmy" Brewer, who also co-wrote and provided the vocals for "Ginny's Song", a 1976 single on the Warner Bros. label, and Jimmy Thudpucker's Greatest Hits, an LP released by Windsong Records, John Denver's subsidiary of RCA Records.

== Style ==
With the exception of Walden College, Trudeau has frequently used real-life settings, based on real scenarios, but with fictional results. Because of lead times, real-world events have rendered some of Trudeau's comics unusable, such as a 1973 series featuring John Ehrlichman, a 1989 series set in Tiananmen Square in Beijing, China, a 1993 series involving Zoë Baird, and a 2005 series involving Harriet Miers. Trudeau has also displayed fluency in various forms of jargon, including those of real estate agents, flight attendants, computer scientists, journalists, presidential aides, and soldiers in Iraq.

=== Walden College ===
The unnamed college attended by the main characters was later given the name "Walden College", revealed to be in Connecticut (the same state as Yale), and depicted as devolving into a third-rate institution under the weight of grade inflation, slipping academic standards, and the end of tenure, issues that Trudeau has consistently revisited since the original characters graduated. Some of the second generation of Doonesbury characters have attended Walden, a venue Trudeau uses to advance his concerns about academic standards in the United States.

President King, the leader of Walden College, was originally intended as a parody of Kingman Brewster, President of Yale, but all that remains of that is a certain physical resemblance.

=== Use of real-life politicians as characters ===
Even though Doonesbury frequently features real-life U.S. politicians, they are rarely depicted with their real faces. Originally, strips featuring the President of the United States would show an external view of the White House, with dialogue emerging from inside. During the Gerald Ford administration, characters would be shown speaking to Ford at press conferences, and fictional dialogue supposedly spoken by Ford would be written as coming "off-panel". Similarly, while having several characters as students in a class taught by Henry Kissinger, the dialogue made up for Kissinger would also come from "off-panel" (although Kissinger had earlier appeared as a character with his face shown in a 1972 series of strips in which he met Mark Slackmeyer while the latter was on a trip to Washington). Sometimes hands, or in rare cases, the back of heads would also be seen.

Later, personal symbols reflecting some aspect of their character came into use. These included:

- Ronald Reagan as "Ron Headrest," a computer-generated video character in imitation of Max Headroom
- George H. W. Bush as a disembodied voice, indicating a lack of personality
- Dan Quayle as a talking feather, both as a pun on his name and representing him as a political lightweight
- Bill Clinton as a talking waffle in reference to his triangulation strategy
- Newt Gingrich as a talking fragmentation bomb, referring to his reputation as a political bomb-thrower
- White nationalist David Duke as a talking swastika
- George W. Bush initially as a disembodied voice wearing a Stetson hat, since he had been Governor of Texas. After his controversial election the voice became an asterisk, and during the war on terror the hat was replaced with a Roman military helmet that grew increasingly worn.
- Arnold Schwarzenegger as a large hand due to accusations that he had groped women

The long career of the series and continual use of real-life political figures, analysts note, have led to some uncanny cases of the cartoon foreshadowing a national shift in the politicians' political fortunes. Tina Gianoulis in St. James Encyclopedia of Popular Culture observes that "In 1971, well before the conservative Reagan years, a forward-looking B.D. called Ronald Reagan his 'hero'. In 1984, almost ten years before Congressman Newt Gingrich became Speaker of the House, another character worried that he would 'wake up someday in a country run by Newt Gingrich.'" In its 2003 series "John Kerry: A Candidate in the Making" on the 2004 presidential race, The Boston Globe reprinted and discussed 1971 Doonesbury cartoons of the young Kerry's Vietnam War protest speeches.

== Characters ==
Doonesbury has a large group of recurring characters, with 24 currently listed at the strip's website. There, it notes that "readers new to Doonesbury sometimes experience a temporary bout of character shock", as the sheer number of characters (and the historical connections among them) can be overwhelming.

The main characters are a group who attended the fictional Walden College during the strip's first 12 years, and moved into a commune together in April 1972. Most of the other characters first appeared as family members, friends, or other acquaintances. The original Walden Commune residents were Mike Doonesbury, Zonker Harris, Mark Slackmeyer, Nichole, Bernie, and DiDi. In September 1972, Joanie Caucus joined the comic, meeting Mike and Mark in Colorado and eventually moving into the commune. They were later joined by B.D. and his girlfriend (later wife) Boopsie, upon B.D.'s return from Vietnam. Nichole, DiDi, and Bernie were mostly phased out in subsequent years, and Zonker's Uncle Duke was introduced as the most prominent character outside the Walden group, and the main link to many secondary characters.

The Walden students graduated in 1983, after which the strip began to progress in something closer to real time. Their spouses and developing families became more important after this: Joanie's daughter J.J. Caucus married Mike and they had a daughter, Alex Doonesbury. They divorced, Mike married Kim Rosenthal, a Vietnamese refugee (who had appeared in the strip as a baby adopted by a Jewish family just after the fall of Saigon; see Operation Babylift), and J.J. married Zeke Brenner, her former boyfriend and Uncle Duke's former groundskeeper. Joanie married Rick Redfern, and they had a son, Jeff. Uncle Duke and Roland Hedley have also appeared often, frequently in more topical settings unconnected to the main characters. In more recent years the second generation has taken prominence as they have grown to college age: Jeff Redfern, Alex Doonesbury, Zonker's nephew Zipper Harris, and Uncle Duke's son Earl.

== Controversial strips and groundbreaking moments ==
Doonesbury has covered numerous political and social issues, some of which were pioneering and others that drew criticism:

=== 1970s ===
- A November 1972 Sunday strip depicting Zonker telling a little boy in a sandbox a fairy tale ending in the protagonist being awarded "his weight in fine, uncut Turkish hashish" raised an uproar.
- During the Watergate scandal, a strip showed Mark on the radio with a "Watergate profile" of John Mitchell, declaring him "Guilty! Guilty, guilty, guilty!!" A number of newspapers removed the strip and one, The Washington Post, ran an editorial criticizing the cartoon. Following Richard Nixon's death in 1994, the strip was rerun with all the instances of the word "guilty" crossed out and replaced with "flawed".
- In June 1973, the military newspaper Stars and Stripes dropped Doonesbury for being too political. The strip was quickly reinstated after hundreds of protests by military readers.
- September 1973: The Lincoln Journal became the first newspaper to move Doonesbury to its editorial page.
- In February 1976, a storyline included the character Andy Lippincott saying that he was gay. Dozens of papers opted not to publish the storyline, with Miami Herald editor Larry Jinks saying, "We just decided we weren't ready for homosexuality in a comic strip."
- In November 1976, when the storyline included the blossoming romance of Rick Redfern and Joanie Caucus, four days of strips were devoted to a transition from one apartment to another, ending with a view of the two together in bed, marking the first time any nationally run comic strip portrayed premarital sex in this fashion. The strip was removed from the comics pages of a number of newspapers, although some newspapers opted to simply repeat the opening frame of that day's strip.
- In June 1978, a strip included a coupon listing various politicians and dollar amounts allegedly taken from Korean lobbyists, to be clipped and glued to a postcard to be sent to the Speaker of the House Tip O'Neill, resulting in an overflow of mail to the Speaker's office.

=== 1980s ===
- In 1985, a series of Doonesbury strips helped to repeal a 60-year-old discriminatory law in Palm Beach, in Florida.
- In June 1985, a strip featuring Aniello Dellacroce and Frank Sinatra together, which referred to Dellacroce as an "alleged human" who has been charged with murder led to several papers dropping the strip and a statement from Sinatra.
- In December 1988, a Sunday strip featured the R.J. Reynolds Tobacco Company in which a prospective executive cannot deny the link between smoking and cancer without bursting out laughing. The Winston-Salem Journal did not print the strip because "it would be personally offensive to its employees." It was the first time the strip had been pulled in deference to a corporation.
- In June 1989, several days' comics (which had already been drawn and written) had to be replaced with repeats, because the humor of the strips was considered in bad taste in light of the violent crackdown on protesters in Tiananmen Square in Beijing. Trudeau himself asked for the recall, despite an interview published with Universal Press Syndicate Editorial Director Lee Salem in the May 28, 1989, San Jose Mercury News, in which Salem stated his hopes the strips could still be used.

=== 1990s ===
- In November 1991, a series of strips appeared to give credibility to a real-life prison inmate who falsely stated that former Vice President Dan Quayle had connections with drug dealers. The strip sequence was dropped by some two dozen newspapers, in part because the allegations had been investigated and dispelled previously. Six years later, the reporter who broke the Quayle story, some weeks after the Doonesbury cartoons, later published a book saying he no longer believed the story had been true.
- In November 1993, a storyline dealing with California wildfires was dropped from several California newspapers, including the Los Angeles Times, The Orange County Register, and The San Diego Union-Tribune.
- In June 1994, the Roman Catholic Church took issue with a series of strips dealing with the book Same-Sex Unions in Pre-Modern Europe by John Boswell. A few newspapers dropped single strips from the series, and the Bloomington, Illinois, Pantagraph refused to run the entire series.
- In March 1995, John McCain denounced Trudeau on the floor of the Senate: "Suffice it to say that I hold Trudeau in utter contempt." This was in response to a strip about Bob Dole's strategy of exploiting his war record during his presidential campaign. The quotation was used on the cover of Trudeau's book Doonesbury Nation. McCain and Trudeau later made peace: McCain wrote the foreword to The Long Road Home, Trudeau's collection of comic strips dealing with character B.D.'s leg amputation during the second Iraq war.
- In February 1998, a strip dealing with Bill Clinton's sex scandal was removed from the comics pages of a number of newspapers because it included the phrases "oral sex" and "semen-streaked dress".

=== 2000s ===
- In November 2000, a strip was not run in some newspapers when Duke said of presidential candidate George W. Bush: "He's got a history of alcohol abuse and cocaine."
- In September 2001, a strip perpetuated the Internet hoax that claimed George W. Bush had the lowest IQ of any president in the last 50 years, half that of Bill Clinton. When caught repeating the hoax, Trudeau apologized "with a trademark barb – he said he deeply apologized for unsettling anyone who thought the president quite intelligent."
- In 2003, a cartoon that publicized the recent medical research suggesting a connection between masturbation and a reduced risk of prostate cancer, with one character alluding to the practice as "self-dating", was not run in many papers; pre-publication sources indicated that as many as half of the 700 papers to which it was syndicated were planning not to run the strip.
- In February 2004, Trudeau used his strip to make the apparently genuine offer of $10,000 (to the USO in the winner's name) for anyone who could personally confirm that George W. Bush was actually present during any part of his service in the National Guard. Reuters and CNN reported by the end of that week that despite 1,300 responses, no credible evidence had been offered. An FAQ posted on the Doonesbury site in September of that year noted that the submissions, while "surreally entertaining", had failed to provide a single definitive corroborator, adding that Trudeau had donated the $10,000 to the USO anyway.
- April 2004: On April 21, after nearly 34 years, readers finally saw B.D.'s head without some sort of helmet. In the same strip, it was revealed that he had lost a leg in the Iraq War. Two days later, on April 23, after awakening and discovering his situation, B.D. exclaims "SON OF A BITCH!!!" The single strip was removed from many papers—including The Boston Globe—although in others, such as Newsday, the offending word was replaced by a line. The Dallas Morning News ran the cartoon uncensored, with a footnote that the editor believed profanity was appropriate, given the subject matter. An image of B.D. with an amputated leg also appeared on the cover of Rolling Stone that summer (issue 954).
- In June 2005, Trudeau published The Long Road Home, a book devoted to B.D.'s recovery from his loss of a leg in Iraq. Although Trudeau opposed the Iraq War, the foreword was written by Senator John McCain, a supporter of the war. McCain was impressed by Trudeau's desire to highlight the struggle of seriously wounded veterans, and his desire to assist them. Proceeds from the book, and its sequel The War Within benefited Fisher House.
- July 2005: Several newspapers declined to run two strips in which George W. Bush refers to his adviser Karl Rove as "Turd Blossom", a nickname Bush has been reported to use for Rove.
- In September 2005 when The Guardian relaunched in a smaller format, Doonesbury was dropped for reasons of space. After a flood of protests, the strip was reinstated with an omnibus covering the issues missed and a full apology.
- The strips scheduled to run from October 31 to November 5, 2005, and a Sunday strip scheduled for November 13 about the nomination of Harriet Miers to the Supreme Court were withdrawn after her nomination was withdrawn. The strips have been posted on the official website, and were replaced by re-runs by the syndicate.
- Trudeau sought input from readers as to where Alex Doonesbury should attend college in a May 15, 2006, straw poll at Doonesbury.com. Voters chose among MIT, Rensselaer, and Cornell. Students from Rensselaer and then MIT hacked the system, which was designed to limit each computer to one vote. In the end, voters logged 175,000 votes, with MIT grabbing 48% of the total. The Doonesbury Town Hall FAQ stated that given that the rules of the poll had not ruled out such methods, "the will, chutzpah, and bodacious craft of the voting public will be respected", declaring that Alex will be attending MIT.
- Before the 2008 presidential election, Trudeau sent out strips to run in the days after the election in which Barack Obama was portrayed as the winner. Newspapers were also provided with old strips as an alternative. When asked whether he created the original strip with complete confidence in an Obama victory, Trudeau replied: "Nope, more like rational risk assessment. Nate Silver at FiveThirtyEight is now giving McCain a 3.7% chance of winning – pretty comfortable odds. Here's the way I look at it: If Obama wins, I'm in the flow and commenting on a phenomenon. If he loses, it'll be a massive upset, and the goofy misprediction of a comic strip will be pretty much lost in the uproar. I figure I can survive a little egg on my face." In response, McCain spokesman Tucker Bounds said, "We hope the strip proves to be as predictive as it is consistently lame."

=== 2010s ===
- The sequence for the week of March 12–17, 2012, lampooning the changes in abortion law in several states was pulled or moved to the editorial page by a number of newspapers.

== Criticism ==
When the strip became a success with its often seemingly static imagery where the essential action is entirely in the dialogue, veteran cartoonist Al Capp grudgingly admitted: "Anybody who can draw bad pictures of the White House four times in a row and succeed knows something I don't. His style defies all measurement."

Charles M. Schulz of Peanuts called Trudeau "unprofessional" for taking a long sabbatical. (See also, similar comments by Schulz about sabbaticals taken by Bill Watterson.) Nor was the return of the strip itself greeted with universal acclaim; in 1985, Saturday Review listed Trudeau as one of the country's "Most Overrated People in American Arts and Letters", commenting that the "most publicized return since MacArthur's has produced a strip that is predictable, mean-spirited, and not as funny as before."

Doonesbury has angered, irritated, or been rebuked by many of the political figures that have appeared or been referred to in the strip over the years. A 1984 series of strips showing Vice President George H. W. Bush placing his manhood in a blind trust—in parody of Bush's use of that financial instrument to fend off concerns that his governmental decisions would be influenced by his investment holdings—brought the politician to complain, "Doonesbury's carrying water for the opposition. Trudeau is coming out of deep left field."

Some conservatives have intensely criticized Doonesbury. Several examples are cited in the Milestones section of the strip's website. The strip has also met criticism from its readers almost since it began syndicated publication. For example, when Lacey Davenport's husband Dick, in the last moments before his death, calls on God, several conservative pundits called the strip blasphemous. The sequence of Dick Davenport's final bird-watching and fatal heart attack was run in November 1986.

Liberal politicians skewered by Trudeau in the strip have also complained, including Democrats such as former U.S. House Speaker Tip O'Neill and California Governor Jerry Brown.

Strips about post-World War II American wars have also generated controversy, including Vietnam, Grenada, Panama and both Gulf Wars.

After many letter-writing campaigns demanding the removal of the strip were unsuccessful, conservatives changed their tactics, and instead of writing to newspaper editors, they began writing to one of the printers who prints the color Sunday comics. In 2005, Continental Features refused to continue printing the Sunday Doonesbury, causing it to disappear from the 38 Sunday papers that Continental Features printed. Of the 38, only one newspaper, The Anniston Star in Anniston, Alabama, continued to carry the Sunday Doonesbury, though of necessity in black and white.

Some newspapers have dealt with the criticism by moving the strip from the comics page to the editorial page, because many people believe that a politically based comic strip like Doonesbury does not belong in a traditionally child-friendly comics section. The Lincoln Journal started the trend in 1973. In some papers (such as the Tulsa World and Orlando Sentinel) Doonesbury appears on the opinions page alongside Mallard Fillmore, a politically conservative comic strip.

== Awards and honors ==
- In 1975, the strip won Trudeau a Pulitzer Prize for Editorial Cartooning, the first strip cartoon to be so honored. The Editorial Cartoonists' Society subsequently passed a resolution condemning the Pulitzer Committee. (After being assured that the award was irrevocable, Trudeau supported the resolution.) Doonesbury was also a Nominated Pulitzer Finalist in 1990, 2004, and 2005.
- In 1977, the short film A Doonesbury Special won the Grand Jury Prize from the Cannes Film Festival. It was nominated for the Palme d'Or for "Best Short Film". It was also nominated for an Academy Award.
- Trudeau received Certificates of Achievement from the US Army 4th Battalion 67th Armor Regiment and the Ready First Brigade in 1991 for his comic strips dealing with the first Gulf War. The texts of these citations are quoted on the back of the comic strip collection Welcome to Club Scud!
- Trudeau won the Reuben Award from the National Cartoonists Society in 1995.
- Trudeau was awarded the US Army's Commander's Award for Public Service in 2006 for his series of strips about B.D.'s recovery following the loss of his leg in Iraq.
- In 2008, Trudeau received the Mental Health Research Advocacy Award from the Yale School of Medicine for his depiction of the mental-health issues facing soldiers upon returning home from the Afghanistan and Iraq wars.
- In 2020, Trudeau was inducted into the New York State Writers Hall of Fame.

== See also ==
- List of published collections of Doonesbury
