= Garry Trudeau =

American cartoonist (born 1948)

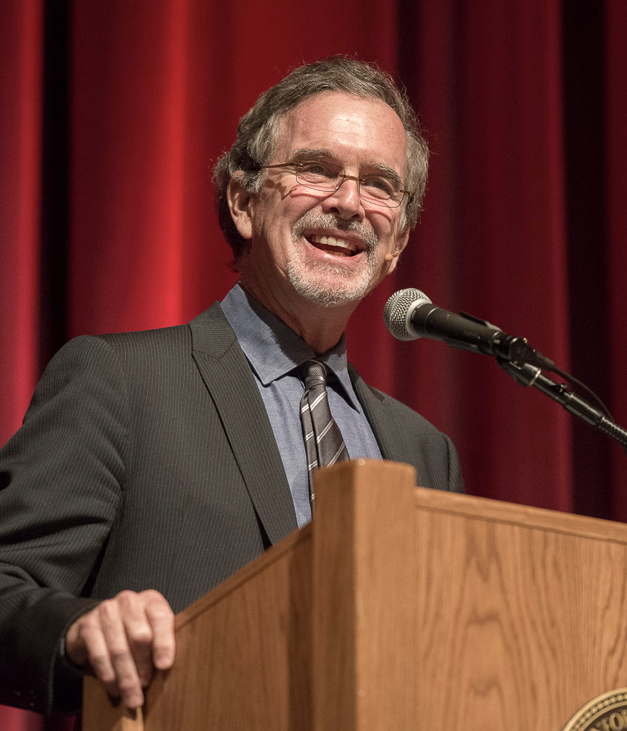
- Trudeau giving a lecture at Stanford in 2014
- Born: Garretson Beekman Trudeau; July 21, 1948 (age 78); New York City, U.S.
- Education: Yale University (BA, MFA)
- Occupation: Cartoonist
- Years active: 1970–present
- Known for: Doonesbury
- Spouse: Jane Pauley (m. 1980)
- Children: 3
- Relatives: Edward Livingston Trudeau (great-grandfather)

Garretson Beekman Trudeau (born July 21, 1948) is an American cartoonist best known for creating the Doonesbury political satirical comic strip.

Trudeau won the Pulitzer Prize for Editorial Cartooning in 1975, making him the first comic strip artist to win a Pulitzer. He is one of only two comic strip artists to win the award, the other being Berkeley Breathed, whose work was influenced by Trudeau. Trudeau was also the creator and executive producer of the Amazon Studios political comedy series Alpha House.

== Early life and education ==
Trudeau was born in New York City, the son of Jean Douglas (née Moore, daughter of New York Assembly member Thomas Channing Moore) and Francis Berger Trudeau Jr. He is the great-grandson of Edward Livingston Trudeau, who created Adirondack Cottage Sanitarium for the treatment of pulmonary tuberculosis at Saranac Lake, New York. Edward was succeeded by his son Francis and grandson Francis Jr. The latter founded the Trudeau Institute at Saranac Lake, with which Garry Trudeau retains a connection.

Raised in Saranac Lake, Trudeau attended St. Paul's School in Concord, New Hampshire. He enrolled in Yale University in 1966. As an art major, Trudeau initially focused on painting, but soon discovered a greater interest in the graphic arts. He spent much of his time cartooning and writing for Yale's humor magazine The Yale Record, eventually serving as the magazine's editor-in-chief. At the same time, Trudeau began contributing to the Yale Daily News, which eventually led to the creation of Bull Tales, a comic strip parodying the exploits of Yale quarterback Brian Dowling. This strip was the progenitor of Doonesbury.

While still an undergraduate at Yale, Trudeau published two collections of Bull Tales: Bull Tales (1969, published by the Yale Daily News) and Michael J. (1970, published by The Yale Record).

As a senior, Trudeau became a member of Scroll and Key. He did postgraduate work at the Yale School of Art, earning a Master of Fine Arts degree in graphic design in 1973. It was there that Trudeau first met photographer David Levinthal, with whom he collaborated on Hitler Moves East, an influential "graphic chronicle" of the German invasion of the Soviet Union.

== Creative works ==
Soon after Bull Tales began running in the Yale student newspaper, the strip caught the attention of the newly formed Universal Press Syndicate. The syndicate's editor, James F. Andrews, recruited Trudeau, changed the strip's name to Doonesbury, and began distributing it following the cartoonist's graduation in 1970. Today Doonesbury is syndicated to 1,000 daily and Sunday newspapers worldwide and is accessible online in association with The Washington Post.

In 1975, Trudeau became the first comic strip artist to win a Pulitzer, traditionally awarded to editorial-page cartoonists. He was also a Pulitzer finalist in 1990, 2004, and 2005. Other awards during this time include the National Cartoonist Society Newspaper Comic Strip Award in 1994, the Reuben Award from the National Cartoonist Society in 1995, the George Orwell Award in 1994, and the Forte dei Marmi Prize for Satire 1990 in Italy,

Awards received in the 21st century include: The Max & Moritz Award for Best Comic Strip (2006, Germany) the Harvey Award, Best Syndicated Strip (2011), the George Polk Award, Lifetime Achievement (2015), and the National Cartoonist Society's Gold T-Square (2021).

Trudeau's work has been recognized by fellowships and halls of fame. In 1993, Trudeau was made a fellow of the American Academy of Arts and Sciences. In 2021, he was inducted into the New York State Writers Hall of Fame, and the Eisner Hall of Fame in 2023.

Wiley Miller, fellow comic-strip artist responsible for Non Sequitur, called him "far and away the most influential editorial cartoonist in the last 25 years". A regular graduation speaker, Trudeau has received 37 honorary degrees.

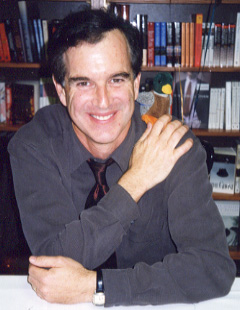
Trudeau in 1999

In addition to his creating his strip, Trudeau has worked in both theater and television. He was nominated for an Oscar in 1977 in the category of Animated Short Film for A Doonesbury Special, created for NBC in collaboration with John and Faith Hubley. The film won the Cannes Film Festival Jury Prize in 1978. In 1984, with composer Elizabeth Swados, he wrote the book and lyrics for the Broadway musical Doonesbury, for which he was nominated for two Drama Desk Awards. A cast album of the show, recorded for MCA, received a Grammy nomination. Trudeau again collaborated with Swados in 1984, this time on Rap Master Ronnie, a satirical revue about the Reagan Administration that opened off-Broadway at the Village Gate. A filmed version, featuring Jon Cryer, the Smothers Brothers, and Carol Kane, was broadcast on Cinemax in 1988.

Also in 1988, Trudeau wrote and co-produced with director Robert Altman HBO's critically acclaimed Tanner '88, a satiric look at that year's presidential election campaign. The show won the gold medal for Best Television Series at the Cannes Television Festival, the British Academy Television Award for Best Foreign Program, and Best Imported Program from the British Broadcasting Press Guild. It earned an Emmy Award, as well as four ACE Award nominations. In 2004, Trudeau reunited with Altman to write and co-produce a sequel mini-series, Tanner on Tanner, for the Sundance Channel.

In February 2000, Trudeau, working with Dotcomix, launched Duke2000, a web-based presidential campaign featuring a real-time, 3-D, streaming-animation version of Duke. Nearly 30 campaign videos were created for the site, and Ambassador Duke was interviewed live by satellite on the Today Show, Larry King Live, The Charlie Rose Show, and dozens of local TV and radio news shows.

In 2013, Trudeau created, wrote and co-produced Alpha House, a political sitcom starring John Goodman that revolves around four Republican U.S. Senators who live together in a townhouse on Capitol Hill. Trudeau was inspired to write the show's pilot after reading a 2007 New York Times article about a real D.C. townhouse shared by New York Senator Chuck Schumer, Illinois Senator Dick Durbin, and California Representative George Miller, all Democrats. The pilot for Alpha House was produced by Amazon Studios and aired in early 2013. Due to positive response, Amazon picked up the show to develop into a full series, streaming eleven episodes for its first season. On March 31, 2014, Amazon announced that Alpha House had been renewed. Production began in July 2014, and the entire second season became available for streaming on October 24, 2014.

While writing Alpha House, Trudeau put the daily Doonesbury into rerun mode. On March 3, 2014, the "Classic Doonesbury" series began, featuring approximately four weeks of daily strips from each year of the strip's run. He continues to produce new strips for Sundays. Although Alpha House has not been in production since the end of 2014, Trudeau has not returned to creating daily Doonesbury strips; new material remains a Sunday-only event.

Trudeau has contributed to such publications as Harper's, Rolling Stone, The New Republic, The New Yorker, New York, and The Washington Post. From 1990 to 1994, he wrote and drew an occasional column for The New York Times op-ed page, and was a contributing essayist for Time magazine from 1996 to 2001.

Beginning with the Gulf War in 1991, Trudeau has written about military issues extensively. In recognition for his work on injured soldiers, he has been presented with the Commander's Award for Public Service by the Department of the Army, the Commander's Award from Disabled American Veterans, the President's Award for Excellence in the Arts from Vietnam Veterans of America, the Distinguished Public Service Award from the American Academy of Physical Medicine and Rehabilitation, the Mental Health Research Advocacy Award from the Yale School of Medicine, and a special citation from the Vet Centers.

He received several unit commendations from the field during the Gulf War, and he traveled with the USO to visit troops in Iraq and Afghanistan. From 2005 to 2014, his website hosted The Sandbox, a milblog posting over 800 essays by deployed soldiers, returned vets, caregivers, and spouses. For most of the strip's run, Trudeau has eschewed merchandising, but starting in 1998 he teamed up with Starbucks to create Doonesbury products to raise funds for local literacy programs. The items were offered for sale in Starbucks stores for nearly two years and raised over $1 million. Also for charity, Trudeau licensed the strip to Ben & Jerry's, which created a bestselling sorbet flavor called Doonesberry.

Trudeau's son Ross, a digital media producer, is also a crossword constructor who has been published in the New York Times. As part of the ongoing celebrity partnership series, father and son collaborated on a crossword puzzle that was published on May 15, 2018, in the Times.

Trudeau, formerly a member of Writers Guild of America, East, left and maintained financial core status.

== Private life and public appearances ==
Trudeau married Jane Pauley on June 14, 1980; they have three children. He maintains a low personal profile. A rare early appearance on television was as a guest on To Tell the Truth in 1971, where only one of the three panelists guessed his identity. In 1990, Trudeau appeared on the cover of Newsweek for Inside Doonesbury's Brain, a story written by Jonathan Alter. This was the first interview Trudeau had given in 17 years.

Trudeau cooperated extensively with Wired magazine for a 2000 profile, "The Revolution Will be Satirized". He later spoke with the writer of that article, Edward Cone, for a 2004 newspaper column in the Greensboro, North Carolina, News & Record, about the war wounds suffered by the Doonesbury character "B.D.", and in 2006 did a Q&A at Cone's personal blog about The Sandbox. Trudeau granted an interview to Rolling Stone in 2004 in which he discussed his time at Yale, which he entered two years after George W. Bush. He granted another Rolling Stone interview in 2010. In 2006, The Washington Post printed an extensive profile of Trudeau by writer Gene Weingarten. He appeared on the Charlie Rose television program, and at signings for The Long Road Home: One Step at a Time, his Doonesbury book about B.D.'s struggle with injuries received during the second Gulf War.

On August 1, 2016, Trudeau appeared on MSNBC on The Rachel Maddow Show. He was brought on to discuss his prediction about Donald Trump's plans to run for president almost three decades earlier. Maddow presented cartoon strips from as far back as 1987. Trudeau was on her show to promote his new book Yuge, which covers 30 years of Trump appearing in Doonesbury. On November 7, 2016, Trudeau appeared on Fresh Air with Terry Gross to discuss Yuge. On the CBS News Sunday Morning broadcast of December 2, 2018, he was featured and was interviewed by his wife, Jane Pauley.

== Appraisals and controversies ==
Eric Alterman, writing in The Nation, called Doonesbury "one of the great intellectual/artistic accomplishments of the past half-century, irrespective of category".

Trudeau has also attracted criticism both for the comic strip and for his own opinions. In 1985, responding to changes after his 1983–1984 hiatus in Doonesbury, readers of The Saturday Review voted Trudeau one of the "Most Overrated People in American Arts and Letters", stating that after his hiatus, his comic strip was "predictable, mean-spirited, and not as funny as before." Trudeau's acceptance speech on the occasion of receiving a Polk Award in 2015 for lifetime achievement stirred controversy. In the speech, Trudeau criticized the cartoonists of Charlie Hebdo—some of whom had recently been killed by terrorists after publishing anti-Muslim cartoons —for "punching downward... attacking a powerless, disenfranchised minority with crude, vulgar drawings closer to graffiti than cartoons", and thereby wandering "into the realm of hate speech" with cartoons of Muhammad. Writing in The Atlantic, in which Trudeau had published his speech, political commentator David Frum criticized what he called Trudeau's "moral theory" that calls for identifying "the bearer of privilege", then holding "the privilege-bearer responsible".

In 2026, Trudeau was the subject of a biography by journalist Joshua Kendall entititled Trudeau & Doonesbury: A Biography: The Cartoonist Who Turned the News Into Art. Garry Trudeau calls the new biography ‘Unopposed."

== Bibliography ==
=== Non-Doonesbury publications ===
- Hitler Moves East: A Graphic Chronicle, 1941–43 (with David Levinthal), Sheed, Andrews and McMeel, 1977. LCCN 76-52888. The cover shows two Wehrmacht motorcyclists. The book relates the story of Nazi Germany's Army Group Centre on the Eastern Front through archival photos and new photography of model soldiers (ISBN 0-8362-0708-4).
- Finding Your Religion: When the Faith You Grew Up with Has Lost Its Meaning by Rev. Scotty McLennan, HarperSanFrancisco, 1999. Trudeau drew the cover cartoon and wrote the introduction.
- Doonesbury.com's The Sandbox: Dispatches from Troops in Iraq and Afghanistan, introduction by G. B. Trudeau; edited by David Stanford, Duty Officer, Doonesbury Town Hall, Andrews McMeel Publishing (2007), ISBN 0-7407-6945-6, 978-0740769450. More than 100 blog posts by soldiers in Iraq and Afghanistan, returned vets, caregivers, and family members.
- Doonesbury.com's The War in Quotes, introduction by G. B. Trudeau; edited by David Stanford, Duty Officer, Doonesbury Town Hall, Andrews McMeel Publishing (2008); ISBN 0-7407-7231-7, 978-0740772313.

== Collections ==
Most of Trudeau's original drawings for Doonesbury, along with letters, notebooks, and other archival materials, are in the collection of the Beinecke Rare Book and Manuscript Library at Yale University. Original drawings are also in the collections of the Library of Congress; the Smithsonian Institute's Museum of American History; the National Portrait Gallery; the National Museum of Health and Medicine; and the Billy Ireland Cartoon Library and Museum at Ohio State University.
