= Chevron Nigeria =

Subsidiary of Chevron Corporation

Chevron Nigeria Limited is a subsidiary of Chevron Corporation and it is one of the largest oil producers in Nigeria. It was previously operating in Nigeria under the business name of Gulf Oil Company until merger activities changed its name to Chevron Nigeria. After another merger by the parent company with Texaco, the Nigerian oil and gas assets of Texaco Overseas Petroleum Company of Nigeria were merged into Chevron.

In the shallow and inland waters of Nigeria, the firm operates a joint venture with the Nigerian National Petroleum Corporation.

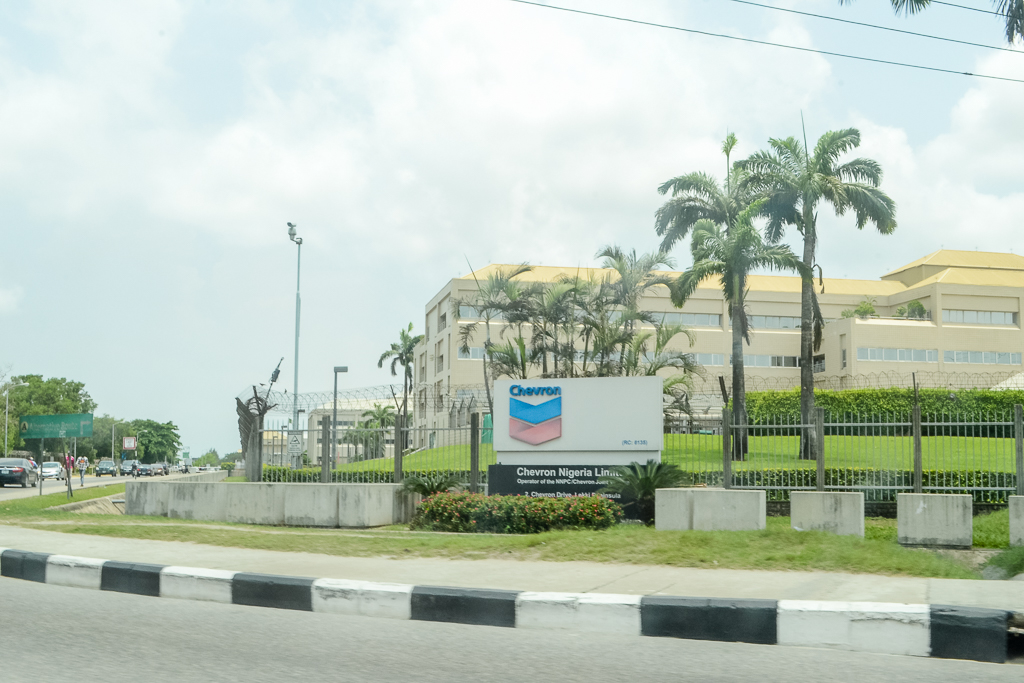
Chevron Lekki 3

== History ==
=== Texaco Overseas ===
Texaco commenced operations Nigeria in 1961 under the business name, American Overseas Company (Amoseas), a joint operation of Texaco and Standard Oil Company of California (Chevron). Drilling operations began in 1963 but it was not until the end of the Biafran War that production began at an average of 2,500 barrels (400 m^{3}) of oil per day. The company ramped up production to 65,000 barrels (10,300 m^{3}) of oil per day in 1984. In 1970, the firm's operating name was changed to Texaco Overseas Company of Nigeria. Gradually, the participatory interest became 60% for NNPC, 20% for Texaco (operator) and 20% for Chevron (previously Standard oil of California). The company's top production fields were located offshore in water depths between 30 and 400 metres (98 and 1,312 ft), majority of the oil flowed into the firm's floating and storage facility, M.V. Oloibiri which has a holding capacity of 1.5 million barrels of oil. In the 1990s, the company entered into a joint alliance with Statoil and BP in the ownership of OPL's 217 and 218 and a joint alliance with Famfa as operator of OPL 216.

=== Gulf Oil ===
Gulf Oil Company of Nigeria which became later known as Chevron obtained oil acreage license in 1961. It is noteworthy for being the first oil major to discover commercially viable offshore oil with its discovery of the large Okan field, at Escravos River in 1963. The field had an estimated 2 billion barrels of oil in place and up to 800 million of recoverable crude oil. Production from the oilfield began in 1965. Over the years, the company has developed a large petroleum and physical infrastructure in Nigeria that include the Escravos Tank farm, an export terminal, Escravos gas gathering project and an office complex. By 1993, the company had produced 2.55 billion barrels of crude oil in Nigeria. The major fields of the firm include, Okan, Delta South, Meren, Meji, Isan, and Abiteye.

In 1998, Democracy Now! produced the documentary Drilling and Killing: Chevron and Nigeria's Oil Dictatorship after journalists Amy Goodman and Jeremy Scahill documented Chevron Corporation's role in a confrontation between the Nigerian Army and villagers who had seized oil rigs and other equipment belonging to oil corporations. Two villagers were shot and killed during the standoff. On May 28, 1998, the company provided helicopter transport to the Nigerian Navy and Mobile Police (MOPOL) to their Parabe oil platform, which had been occupied by villagers who accused the company of contaminating their land. Soon after landing, the Nigerian military shot and killed two of the protesters, Jola Ogungbeje and Aroleka Irowaninu, and wounded 11 others. Chevron spokesperson Sola Omole acknowledged that the company transported the troops. Omole said that Chevron management had requested troops from the government to protect their facility.

Following a merger between Gulf Oil and Chevron Corporation, Gulf's oil operations in Nigeria became known as Chevron in 1991 and in 2001, a merger with Texaco led to combining Texaco's remaining assets in Nigeria with Chevron.

== Activities ==
Chevron's activities inland and in shallow waters have been deeply affected by local and criminal activities. However, the company has been active producing commercially viable gas in its Western Niger Delta operations and its deepwater operations. Prior to militancy in the Niger Delta, Chevron was Nigeria's third largest oil producer after Shell and Mobil Producing.

=== Partnership with NNPC ===
Chevron operates under a joint-venture agreement with the Nigerian National Petroleum Company (NNPC). Chevron has a significant stake in multi-partner deepwater projects as well. The Agbami field, which is one of Nigeria's biggest deepwater discoveries, is operated by the company. Additionally, Chevron holds a non-operated interest in the Usan Field. Over 600 initiatives, which have resulted in the creation of scholarships, new schools, medical facilities, and housing, as well as support for agriculture and infrastructure development in the country, have been funded by the NNPC/Chevron joint venture, which has spent more than $118 million.
