= University of Michigan Press =

Part of Michigan Publishing at the University of Michigan Library

- Parent company: University of Michigan
- Status: Active
- Founded: 1930
- Country of origin: United States
- Headquarters location: Ann Arbor, Michigan
- Distribution: Chicago Distribution Center (US); Eurospan Group (Europe and Africa)
- Publication types: Books, digital media
- Nonfiction topics: Humanities and social sciences
- Official website: press.umich.edu

The University of Michigan Press is a university press that is a part of Michigan Publishing at the University of Michigan Library. It publishes 170 new titles each year in the humanities and social sciences. Titles from the press have earned numerous awards, including Lambda Literary Awards, the PEN/Faulkner Award, the Joe A. Callaway Award, and the Nautilus Book Award. The press has published works by authors who have been awarded the Pulitzer Prize, the National Humanities Medal and the Nobel Prize in Economics.

== History ==
From 1858 to 1930, the University of Michigan had no organized entity for its scholarly publications, which were generally conference proceedings or department-specific research. The University Press was established in 1930 under the university's Graduate School, and in 1935, Frank E. Robbins, assistant to university president Alexander G. Ruthven, was appointed as the managing editor of the University Press. He would hold this position until 1954, when Fred D. Wieck was appointed as Press Director. Though initial plans for the press only foresaw it maintaining the output of conference materials and Alumni Readings Lists, Robbins expanded this vision to include publications on diverse fields of interest, such as archaeology, linguistics, and international interests.

In 2009, the press became a part of the University of Michigan Library. Today, the press primarily publishes English Language Teaching (ELT) textbooks and teacher training manuals, scholarly monographs in a variety of fields—including classical studies, Asian studies, political science, disability studies, and theater and performance—and books on Michigan and the Great Lakes region.

== English language teaching ==
The University of Michigan Press is known for its English as a Second Language (ESL) product line. Because the University of Michigan was the first place to publish ESL student textbooks and teacher training manuals in the United States (1941), the products ultimately ended up being first distributed and then fully published by the University of Michigan Press. Although at one point the only new titles published were those by faculty and staff at the English Language Institute, authors currently represent a variety of institutions around the world. Today, the MICHIGAN ELT list is primarily recognized for its English for Academic Purposes (EAP) and teacher training products.

== Digital media ==
The University of Michigan Press has over 1,100 monographs in its catalogue that are available as ebooks, and it is involved in several digital media projects.

=== digitalculturebooks ===
digitalculturebooks is an imprint of the University of Michigan Press dedicated to publishing innovative work in new media studies and digital humanities. The imprint began in 2006 as a partnership between MLibrary and the press, taking advantage of the skills and expertise of staff throughout Michigan Publishing. Its primary goal is to be an incubator for new publishing models in the humanities and social sciences.

=== Fulcrum ===
Fulcrum is a publishing platform that the press has developed with a grant from the Andrew W. Mellon Foundation in partnership with Indiana, Minnesota, Northwestern, and Penn State Universities. Fulcrum helps publishers present the full richness of their authors' research outputs in a durable, discoverable, and flexible form. With Fulcrum, scholarly authors can link source materials—including images, video and audio clips, and three-dimensional interactive models—to book-length interpretations of them in an integrated way. These digital objects can be published as supplemental materials, with the book elsewhere, or both narrative and data can be presented together.

=== Knowledge Unlatched ===
The University of Michigan Press is one of thirteen publishers to participate in the Knowledge Unlatched pilot, a global library consortium approach to funding open access books, and has included three titles in the Knowledge Unlatched Pilot Collection.

== Imprints and series ==
=== Imprints ===
- English Language Teaching
- digitalculturebooks

=== Series ===
The University of Michigan Press publishes numerous ongoing series, including:

- Class : Culture
- Configurations: Critical Studies of World Politics
- Corporealities: Discourses on Disability
- Digital Humanities
- Jazz Perspectives
- Law, Meaning, and Violence
- Legislative Politics and Policy Making
- Michigan Modern Dramatists
- New Comparative Politics
- Perspectives on Contemporary Korea
- Poets on Poetry
- Social History, Popular Culture, and Politics in Germany
- Theater: Theory/Text/Performance
- Tracking Pop
- Triangulations: Lesbian/Gay/Queer Theater/Drama/Performance
- Under Discussion

== Controversies ==
In June 2008, the University of Michigan Press severed ties with the British independent publishing firm, Pluto Press for which it served as the American distributor. The decision came after a series of events tied to the distribution of the 2007 book Overcoming Zionism by Joel Kovel, which argues "that the creation of Israel was a mistake and urges adoption of the 'one state' solution to the Israeli-Palestinian conflict in which Israelis and Palestinians would form a new country, without a Jewish character". The University of Michigan Press ceased distributing the book in the Fall of 2007, after "serious questions" were raised about the book by "members of the university community". In addition, the relationship between the University of Michigan Press and Pluto Press came under examination by the faculty committee that oversees the press. Later in September, the University of Michigan Press announced that it would resume distribution of Overcoming Zionism after receiving complaints that it was conducting censorship. The Executive Board of the University of Michigan Press asserted in a statement that though it, "has deep reservations about Overcoming Zionism, it would be a blow against free speech to remove the book from distribution on that basis. We conclude that we should not fail to honor our distribution agreement based on our reservations about the content of a single book." In the same statement, the University of Michigan Press stated that it would review its relationship with Pluto Press.

In October 2007, the University of Michigan Press announced in a statement that it would continue to distribute books for Pluto Press. It also announced that it would review the policies dictating its relationship with external presses. In an interview with Joel Kovel, Amy Goodman of Democracy Now! discussed this issue and focused in particular on the influence of Howard Zinn. In response, Kovel stated that he had contacted Zinn and that "Zinn and other well-known people, like Richard Falk, you know, have said yes, we're on board with this."

In November 2007, three members (out of eight) of the University of Michigan Board of Regents released a statement that called for the University of Michigan Press to cease distributing books for external publishing companies. In January 2008, the University of Michigan announced new guidelines for the distribution of books by external publishing companies. The new guidelines stated that The University of Michigan Press will only distribute books by presses "whose mission is aligned with the mission of the UM Press and whose academic standards and processes of peer review are reasonably similar to those of the UM Press."

In June 2008, the University of Michigan Press ended its relationship with Pluto Press. An associate dean at the University of Michigan who was chair of the executive board of the press, Peggy McCraken stated in an interview with Inside Higher Ed that the relationship ended because Pluto Press does not use the same peer review process as the University of Michigan. She also stated in response to a question that postulated a link with criticism of Overcoming Zionism that "the initial decision of the executive board of the press was that it would not make a decision based on a particular book" and that "certainly the free and open exchange of ideas is the foundation of everything we do at the university." Roger van Zwanenberg, chairman of Pluto Press responded to the decision by linking it to the criticism of Overcoming Zionism. He stated: "What this tells you is that there are dark forces in America who would like to control the flow of ideas, and they are powerfully organized and they are very dangerous." He suggested that The University of Michigan knew that there was a difference in the peer review process from the beginning of their relationship, calling the decision to focus on peer review "a facade". He also stated that Pluto Press would seek a new American distributor. Pluto Press is currently distributed in the United States by the University of Chicago Press."

== See also ==
- List of English-language book publishing companies
- List of university presses
