= Joe A. Callaway Award for Civic Courage =

American courage award

The Joe A. Callaway Award for Civic Courage is presented annually by The Shafeek Nader Trust for the Community Interest. The Callaway Award "recognizes individuals who take a public stance to advance truth and justice, at some personal risk". The award was established by in 1990 by Joe Callaway to recognize "individuals in any area of endeavor who, with integrity and at some personal risk, take a public stance to advance truth and justice, and who challenged prevailing conditions in pursuit of the common good."

The first recipient of the award was Joseph A. Kinney, of the National Safe Workplace in Chicago, who was credited for his fearless advocacy of safety for America's workers.

In 2006 the Sharon Shaffer, Charlie Swift and Bunnatine Greenhouse were awarded the prize. Shaffer and Swift were military officers who vigorously defended Guantanamo captives before Guantanamo military commissions. Greenhouse was a contracting officer employed by the US Army Corps of Engineers, who exposed financial improprieties.

In 2007, award recipients were: Dahr Jamail (independent journalist in Iraq) and Linda Peeno, M.D., (whistleblower and patient advocate).

In 2012, the award was shared by William Binney & J. Kirk Wiebe for their work on Government Data Centers & Spying on Citizens, as well as John Kiriakou for his work on the Government's Torture Policy.

== Past winners ==
1990 Joe A. Kinney, Marie Cirillio

1991 Roldo Bartimole, Thomas E. Gish and Patricia Ann Burnett Gish, Forrest (Frosty) Troy and Helen B. Troy

1992 Karl Z. Morgan, Robert D. Pollard, Mary P. Sinclair

1993 William J. Lehman, William Reid, Terri Swearingen

1994 Robert Bigham, Julie Boyd, Roger Crisafi, Von Marie Erkert, Sherene Lee Jennings, James Keefer, Thomas Vernon Russell Jr., Dennis Shrader, Steven Craig Slagowski, Joseph A. Villarreal, Carroll E. Cox, Allan Nairn

1995 Lance Hughes, Steven W. Jones, Agnes Mulroy

1996 John Brodeur, Janet Chandler, Peter Gunn Montague

1997 Merrell Williams, Stanton Glantz

1998 Jane Akre, Steve Wilson, David F. Noble

1999 Roberta Baskin, Nancy Olivieri, Martha L. Crouch

2000 Doris Haddock, Paul E. Farmer

2001 Anthony Mazzocchi, Amy Goodman

2002 Barry Commoner, Herbert L. Needleman

2003 John Munsell, Theodore A. Postol

2004 David Graham, Mark Livingston

2005 Bunny Greenhouse, Lieutenant Colonel Sharon A. Shaffer, Lieutenant Commander Charles D. Swift

2006 John Thayer, Thomas Baker, Frank Binns, Martin R. Blanchet, Edward J. Hill, Richard Leonard, Charles Morris, Christian Raley, Scott Smith, Timothy Taylor, Maria Gunnoe, Edward (Ed) Wiley

2007 Dahr Jamail, Linda Peeno

2008 Michael German, Barbara Bailey, Peter Chase, George Christian, Jan Nocek

2009 Frances Crowe, Ivor Van Heerden

2010 Becky A. McClain, Percy and Louise Schmeiser

2011 Concepcion Picciotto, Harry Kelber

2012 William Binney & J. Kirk Wiebe, John Kiriakou

2013 Ramsey Clark (lawyer, U.S. Attorney General [1967-69], antiwar campaigner, defender of due process and the rule of law), Saul Landau (human rights activist, journalist, filmmaker)

2014 Marcy Benstock, Dinesh Thakur

2015 John Crane, James Love and Manon Ress, Jonathan G. Lundgren

2016 Whistleblowers for the Common Good, Robert MacLean, Larry Criscione

2017 Joel Clement, Megan Rice, Michael R. Walli, and Greg Boertje-Obed

2018 Sandra C. Black, John Slowik

2023 Josh Paul
