= Society of Professional Journalists =

Association for journalists in the US

- Logo, Society of Professional Journalists
- Formation: April 17, 1909; 117 years ago
- Headquarters: 3909 N. Meridian Street, Indianapolis, Indiana, U.S.
- Official language: English
- President: Emily Bloch
- Key people: Caroline Hendrie - Executive Director
- Website: www.spj.org

The Society of Professional Journalists (SPJ), formerly known as Sigma Delta Chi, is the oldest organization representing journalists in the United States. The organization is headquartered in Indianapolis, Indiana.

It was established on April 17, 1909, at DePauw University in Greencastle, Indiana. Its charter was designed by William Meharry Glenn. It is the oldest organization serving the field of journalism.

Sigma Delta Chi logo

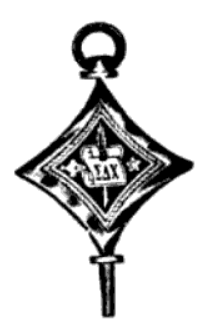
Sigma Delta Chi badge

== History ==
=== Sigma Delta Chi ===
The Society of Professional Journalists was established on April 17, 1909, as a men's collegiate professional fraternity named Sigma Delta Chi. Its ten founding members were Gilbert C. Clippinger, Charles A. Fisher, William M. Glenn, H. Hedges, L. Aldis Hutchens, Edward H. Lockwood, LeRoy H. Millikan, Eugene C. Pulliam, Paul M. Riddick, and Lawrence H. Sloan.

In 1910, Sigma Delta Chi expanded to the University of Kansas, the University of Michigan, Denver University, and the University of Virginia. By 1929, it had initiated 5,821 members at 53 college chapters, with 44 chapters remaining active. It was governed by an executive council consisting of national officers who were elected during the fraternity's annual convention of delegates.

The organization continued to function as a fraternity until 1960 when it became a professional society for journalists. The professional society was a nonprofit voluntary organization for men, with professional membership being by invitation. In 1963, it had initiated more than 24,200 members, 79 active college chapters, and 16 inactive college chapters.

At the 1969 San Diego convention, Sigma Delta Chi decided to begin admitting women into the society.

=== Society of Professional Journalists ===
In 1973, the society changed its name to Society of Professional Journalists, Sigma Delta Chi. In 1988, the present Society of Professional Journalists name was adopted.

The stated mission of SPJ is to promote and defend the First Amendment guarantees of freedom of speech and freedom of the press; encourage high standards and ethical behavior in the practice of journalism; and promote and support diversity in journalism.

== Symbols ==
Sigma Delta Chi's emblem was a key that bore a quill over a scroll, between the lamp of learning on the left and a five-pointed star on the right. Its publication was The Quill.

SPJ's color is blue. Its symbol is its logo. The organization also has a shield logo. Its motto is "Protecting Journalism since 1909".

== Chapters ==
SPJ has had as many as 300 chapters across the United States.

== Membership ==
SPJ has three classes of members: undergraduate, professional, and alumni.

As of 2023, membership has declined from its peak around 10,000 members to more than 4,000 members. The declining number of journalists in the United States appears largely responsible for the decline as well as the organization's inability to afford to put on a conference in 2024.

== Activities ==
The society's chapters bring educational programming to local areas and offer regular contact with other media professionals. SPJ initiatives include a Legal Defense Fund that wages court battles to secure First Amendment rights; the Project Sunshine campaign, to improve the ability of journalists and the public to obtain access to government records; the magazine Quill; and the annual Sigma Delta Chi Awards, which honor excellence in journalism.

=== Code of ethics ===
It has also drawn up a code of ethics that aims to inspire journalists to adhere to high standards of behavior and decision-making while performing their work. Last updated in 2014, this code of ethics has been what the SPJ has been best known for.

== Awards ==
=== Eugene S. Pulliam First Amendment Award ===
The Eugene S. Pulliam First Amendment Award is awarded annually by the Society of Professional Journalists in honor of publisher Eugene S. Pulliam's dedication to First Amendment rights and values. The award seeks "to honor a person or persons who have fought to protect and preserve one or more of the rights guaranteed by the First Amendment." No winners were announced from 2021 to 2024 but The State News, Michigan State University was awarded it in September 2025.

Year	Recipient	References
2025	The State News	
2020	The Post and Courier	
2019	Spotlight Team, Boston Globe	
2018	Kansas City Star	
2017	Better Government Association	
2015	The Columbus Dispatch and the Student Press Law Center	
2014	Associated Press	
2013	Gina Barton, John Diedrich and Ben Poston, Milwaukee Journal Sentinel	
2012	Carol Marbin Miller, Miami Herald	
2011	Associated Press	
2010	Renee Dudley, The Island Packet of Bluffton, S.C.	
2009	Jill Riepenhoff and Todd Jones, The Columbus Dispatch	
2008	Jim Schaefer & M.L. Elrick, Detroit Free Press	
2007	Joe Adams, The Florida Times-Union	
2006	Terry Francke, Peter Scheer, and the California First Amendment Coalition	
2005	Kate Martin and the Center for National Security Studies	
2004	Dan Christensen, Miami Daily Business Review	
2003	Seth Rosenfeld, San Francisco Chronicle	
2002	William Lawbaugh, Mount Saint Mary's University	

=== Kunkel Awards ===
Responding to concerns originating in the Gamergate controversy, in 2015 the SPJ launched the Kunkel Awards (named after pioneering video game journalist Bill Kunkel) for game journalism. The award was folded into the Mark of Excellence Awards in 2020.

Year	Recipient	References
2019	Super Bunnyhop, Alex Andrejev (Washington Post), Luke Winkie (The Atlantic), Kenneth Niemeyer (Daily Mississippian), Alex Andrejev (Washington Post), Ferris Jabr (New York Times Magazine)	
2018	Mark Brown, Megan Fernandez (Indianapolis Monthly), Lydia Niles (The Daily Orange), Felix Gillette (Bloomberg), Cecilia D'Anastasio (Kotaku)	
2017	My Life in Gaming, Brian Crecente (Polygon), Caroline Bartholomew (The Daily Orange), Simon Parkin (Nautilus), Jason Schreier(Kotaku)	
2016	Brad Glasgow (Allthink), Richard Moss (Polygon)/Ben Sailer (Kill Screen), Aiden Strawhun (Kotaku), Danny O'Dwyer (Noclip)	
2015	Kotaku, The Guardian, Super Bunnyhop, Innuendo Studios, Ars Technica	

=== Helen Thomas Award for Lifetime Achievement ===
The Helen Thomas lifetime achievement award was awarded by the SPJ between 2000 and 2010. It was named after Helen Thomas, who received the first award in 2000. The award was discontinued in 2011 due to the controversy surrounding Thomas's statements about Israeli Jews and the Israeli–Palestinian conflict.

Year	Recipient	References
2010	David Perlman (science journalist for the San Francisco Chronicle)	
2009	Robert Churchwell	
2008	Caryl Rivers (Boston University)	
2007	Chuck Stone (first president of the National Association of Black Journalists)	
2006	Stan Chambers (KTLA, Los Angeles)	
2005	Alan Walden (WBAL Baltimore)	
2004	Tom Brokaw (NBC News)	
2003	Ed Barber (The Independent Florida Alligator)	
2002	Tom and Pat Gish (The Mountain Eagle, Whitesburg, Kentucky)	
2001	not awarded	
2000	Helen Thomas, former senior UPI White House correspondent	

=== Other Awards ===
The SPJ also administers the Green Eyeshade Awards and the Sunshine State Awards. The Green Eyeshade Awards annually recognize journalists in Alabama, Arkansas, Florida, Georgia, Kentucky, Louisiana, Mississippi, North Carolina, Puerto Rico, South Carolina, Tennessee, U.S. Virgin Islands, Virginia, and West Virginia. The Sunshine State Awards are given each year to journalists in Florida, Puerto Rico, and the U.S. Virgin Islands.

== See also ==
- Institute for Nonprofit News
- Online News Association
