= Merrell Williams Jr. =

Tobacco industry whistleblower

- Born: January 26, 1941; Baton Rouge, Louisiana, US
- Died: November 18, 2013 (aged 72); Ocean Springs, Mississippi, US
- Other names: Mr. Butts
- Education: Ph.D. in Theater Arts
- Alma mater: Baylor University and University of Denver
- Occupation: paralegal
- Years active: 1988–1994
- Employer: Wyatt, Tarrant & Combs
- Known for: Leaking secret tobacco company documents
- Awards: Joe A. Callaway Award for Civic Courage Gleitsman Foundation's Citizen Activist Award

Merrell Williams Jr. (January 26, 1941 – November 18, 2013) was a whistleblower in the tobacco industry, revealing secret papers of tobacco companies showing that the companies had been lying to the public. It eventually resulted in a multi-billion-dollar settlement with the US states.

== Early life ==
Merrill Williams Jr., was born in Baton Rouge, Louisiana January 26, 1941, to a family of heavy cigarette smokers. The family later moved to West Texas for most of his childhood, then briefly to Mississippi. He attended Baylor University, obtained a master's degree from University of Mississippi, and, in 1971, a Ph.D. in theatre arts at University of Denver. After obtaining his Ph.D., he taught at junior colleges. By 1981, he was a heavy Kool menthol cigarette smoker, an alcoholic, and couldn't find work as a teacher. He began training as a paralegal at Sullivan Junior College of Business. Then his wife of 10 years moved to divorce him. Mr. Williams was left with little other than a bicycle. He took odd jobs to make do.

== Career ==
By the time Williams joined Wyatt, Tarrant & Combs in 1988 as a $9/hr (equivalent to $24/hr in 2024) paralegal, he had declared bankruptcy four times, was behind in child support, and in the middle of his third divorce. His task was to assist the group reviewing documents from tobacco giant Brown & Williamson, preparing defenses for court cases against tobacco companies and legislation restricting tobacco use and marketing.

He began to recognize that some of the papers contained valuable information exposing tobacco company malfeasance. By Christmas of 1988, he began stealing selected documents that he felt were the most important. In 1990 he sent a cache of the documents to his friend, Nina Selz, who lived in Orlando, Florida.

Between 1990 and 1992, he tried to get tobacco industry opponents interested in the documents. In September 1990, he met up with Richard Daynard, an anti-tobacco crusader, at Nina Selz's Orlando home. Daynard referred Williams to Morton Mintz, a retired investigative reporter from the Washington Post. Mintz reviewed the information, but felt that the legal liability was too high to publish it. In March 1992, Williams was fired from his job at Wyatt, Tarrant & Combs. That same month, he had a quintuple bypass operation. June 1992, Williams attempted to interest the U.S. Attorney's office in the issue, after learning that they were looking into allegations of fraud at the Council for Tobacco Research. That attempt failed as well.

The next year, he sued the company for damages, claiming that the contents of the tobacco documents caused him great stress, eventually asking for $2.5 million, equivalent to $5 million in 2024. The company quickly ascertained who was behind the lawsuit, and served him with a restraining order that essentially prevented him from discussing the case with his attorney, but the order was later altered to permit him to speak to his lawyer. The accusations against Williams were later dropped.

In 1994, Williams met with Don Barrett, a Mississippi attorney representing cancer patients suing tobacco firms. Barrett referred Williams to Richard Scruggs, another lawyer, who had made his fortune from asbestos litigation. At the time of the meeting, Williams was "obviously very ill, very nervous, had been drinking." Scruggs noted the significance of the documents Williams had selected. As summarized by Mike Moore (at that time Mississippi's Attorney General), the files refuted "the three big lies" of the tobacco industry: that "cigarettes don’t cause cancer, nicotine is not addictive, and we don’t market to kids." Scruggs began financially supporting Williams, who bought a house and a 30-foot sailboat. Williams also began receiving $3,000/month (equivalent to $6,400/month in 2024) from Scruggs for a paralegal job that didn't require any work.

Scruggs, along with Mike Moore, on May 6, 1994, brought 4,000 pages of Williams' purloined documents to Representative Henry Waxman, who began using them in hearings in Washington. Later that same month, a large box containing the 4,000 pages of documents obtained by Williams, with no return address other than the name "Mr. Butts", was shipped Federal Express to UCSF Professor Stanton Glantz, who quickly recognized their importance and began publicizing the documents and publishing analyses based upon them.

The ensuing series of revelations led to a 1998 settlement against US tobacco companies for over $206 billion, equivalent to over $397 billion in 2024. Scruggs, who had personally received $300 million in the settlement, gave Williams $1.5 million.

== Late life ==
Afterwards, he quickly faded from what limited public view there was. He resided in various locations in Florida, Mississippi, and the Virgin Islands. He died November 18, 2013, in Ocean Springs, Mississippi from heart disease, probably brought on by heavy smoking.

== Awards ==
- Joe A. Callaway Award for Civic Courage (1997)
- Gleitsman Foundation's Citizen Activist Award (1998)
- Proposed for Congressional Medal of Appreciation of Public Spirit (1994) (Joint Resolution died in committee)

== See also ==
- Tobacco Master Settlement Agreement
- The Cigarette Papers
