= The Exception to the Rulers =

- First edition
- Author: Amy Goodman
- Publisher: Hyperion
- Publication date: April 14, 2004
- Media type: Hardcover
- Pages: 352 pages
- ISBN: 978-1-4013-0131-6
- OCLC: 54066579
- Dewey Decimal: 973.931 22
- LC Class: E902 .G66 2004

The Exception to the Rulers is a 2004 non-fiction book co-authored by American liberal journalists Amy and David Goodman. It reached number 12 in the New York Times Best Seller list for non-fiction paperbacks in 2005.

== Contents ==
- Introduction: The Silent Majority
- 1. Blowback
- 2. OILYgarchy
- 3. Drilling and Killing: Chevron and Nigeria's Oil Dictatorship
- 4. Crackdown
- 5. Smackdown
- 6. Lockdown
- 7. Lies of Our Times
- 8. State Media, American Style
- 9. In Bed with the Military
- 10. Killing the Messenger
- 11. Sanitized
- 12. Going to Where the Silence Is
- 13. Not on Bended Knee
- 14. Psyops Comes Home
- 15. Things Get Messy with Sally Jessy
- 16. Hiroshima Cover-up: How the War Department's Timesman won a Pulitzer
- 17. The People's Airwaves
- 18. Conclusion: Free the Media
