= The Cigarette Papers =

Nonfiction Book By Stanton A Glantz

- Editors: Stanton A. Glantz, John Slade, Lisa A. Bero, Peter Hanauer, Deborah E. Barnes
- Language: English
- Published: 1998 by University of California Press
- Publication place: United States
- Media type: Print/Online
- Pages: 560
- ISBN: 9780520213722
- Original copyright is 1996.

The Cigarette Papers is a 1996 non-fiction book by Stanton A. Glantz (editor), John Slade (editor), Lisa A. Bero (editor), Peter Hanauer (editor), Deborah E. Barnes (editor), and C. Everett Koop (Foreword), analyzing leaked documents that for the first time proved "tobacco companies had long known the grave dangers of smoking, and did nothing about it." In May 1994, 4,000 pages of internal tobacco industry documents were sent to the office of Professor Stanton Glantz, a well-known anti-smoking activist, at the University of California, San Francisco. The source of these "cigarette papers" was initially named as Mr. Butts, and was only later identified as Merrell Williams, Jr. The documents provide an inside look at the internal activities of American tobacco company Brown & Williamson over more than 30 years.
