= Seco, Kentucky =

Unincorporated community in Kentucky, United States

- Unincorporated community
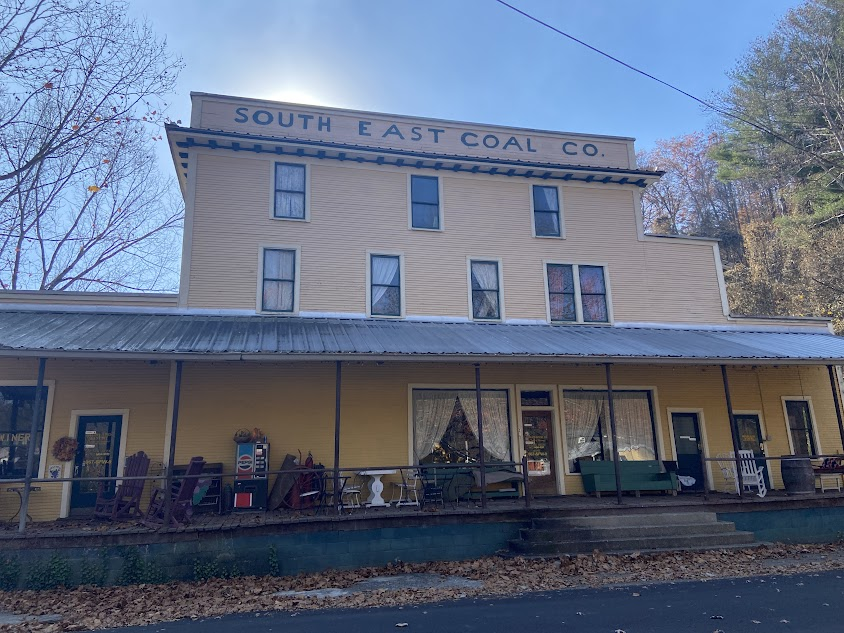
- South East Coal Company Store

- Location in Kentucky Location in the United States
- Coordinates: 37°10′19″N 82°43′56″W
- Country: United States
- State: Kentucky
- County: Letcher
- Elevation: 1,260 ft (380 m)
- Time zone: UTC-5 (Eastern (EST))
  - Summer (DST): UTC-4 (EDT)
- ZIP codes: 41849
- GNIS feature ID: 503143

Seco is an unincorporated community in Letcher County, Kentucky, United States. Located in the eastern part of the state, it lies about 6 miles (9 km) E of Whitesburg. The area was inhabited in the late 19th century, but did not receive a post office until 1915: the name derives from the South East Coal Company, which owned the land. The mines are now defunct, although a small mine may still be visited, to some extent, about 500 feet from the center of town. The main business is the small Highland Winery, established in the mid‑1990s. Tom Gish, longtime publisher of The Mountain Eagle weekly newspaper in nearby Whitesburg, was born in Seco.
