= Amy Goodman =

American journalist and author (born 1957)

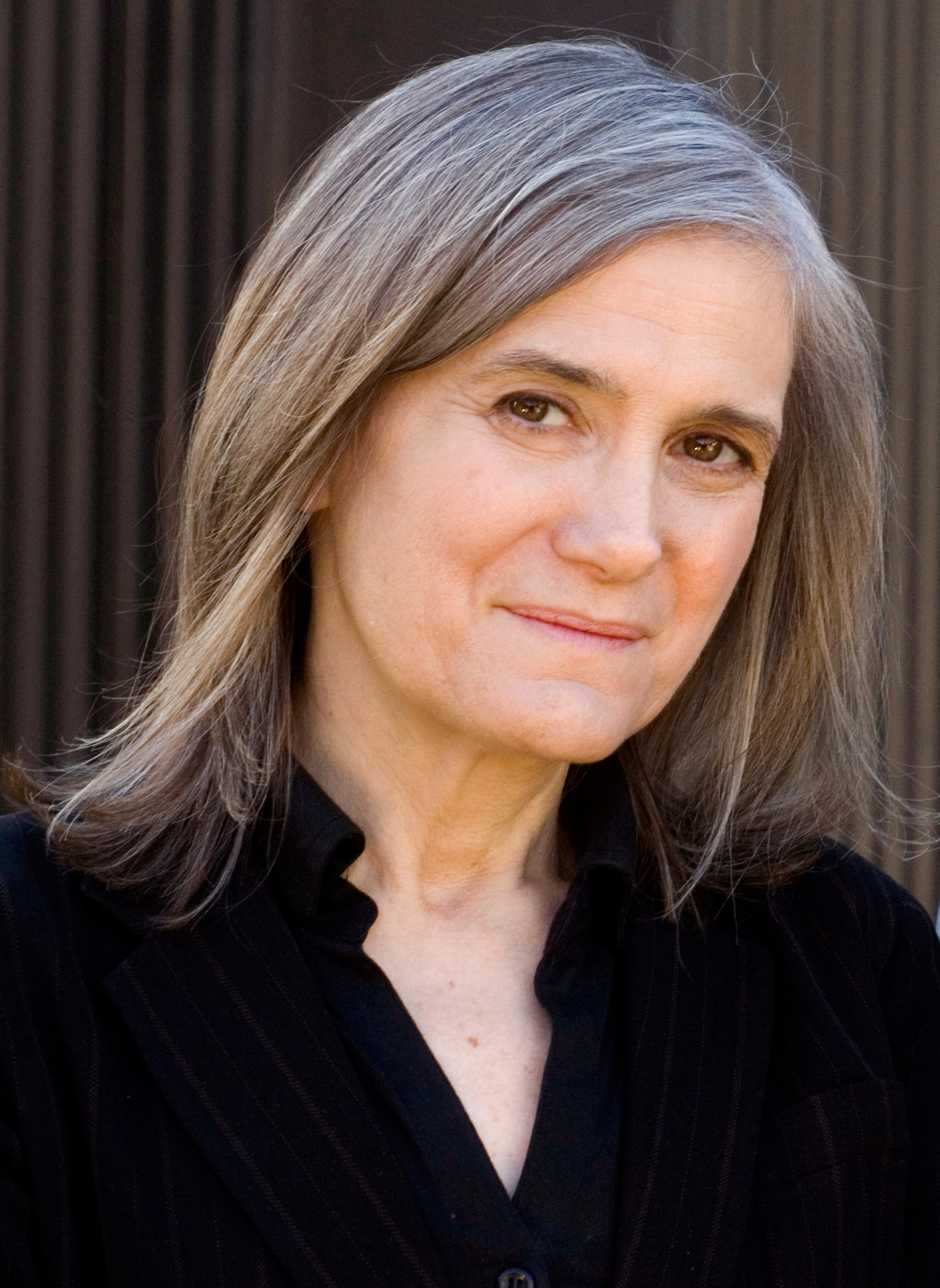
- Goodman in 2019
- Born: April 13, 1957 (age 69); Bay Shore, New York, U.S.
- Education: College of the Atlantic; Radcliffe College (BA)
- Occupations: Journalist and author
- Awards: Right Livelihood Award
- Presenting career
- Show: Democracy Now!
- Network: Pacifica Radio
- Style: Investigative journalism

Amy Goodman (born April 13, 1957) is an American broadcast journalist, syndicated columnist, investigative reporter, and author. Since 1996, Goodman has been the main host and executive producer of Democracy Now!, an independent global news program that she co-founded; it is broadcast daily and syndicated nationally on radio, television, and the Internet, including transcription. On the award-winning program, Goodman elevates voices and perspectives rarely covered in US corporate media.

Highlights of Goodman's investigative journalism career include coverage of the Santa Cruz massacre and the East Timor independence movement, the Chevron Corporation's assistance to armed forces in Nigeria, the 1999 Seattle World Trade Organization protests and anti-globalization activism, the American political prisoner in Peru Lori Berenson, and the US-backed 2004 Haitian coup d'état.

Goodman has received awards for her work, including the Thomas Merton Award in 2004, a Right Livelihood Award in 2008, and an Izzy Award in 2009 for "special achievement in independent media". In 2012, Goodman received the Gandhi Peace Award for a "significant contribution to the promotion of an enduring international peace".

Goodman is the author of six books, including the 2012 The Silenced Majority: Stories of Uprisings, Occupations, Resistance, and Hope, and the 2016 Democracy Now!: Twenty Years Covering the Movements Changing America. In 2014, she was awarded the I.F. Stone Medal for Journalistic Independence by Harvard University's Nieman Foundation. In her field reporting, Goodman has faced attacks and arrest, including in Dili in 1991, Minnesota in 2008, and North Dakota in 2016.

== Early life and education ==
Amy Goodman grew up in Bay Shore, New York, on Long Island, to secular Jewish parents who were active in social action groups. Her father, George Goodman, was an ophthalmologist. Her mother, Dorothy Goodman, was a literature teacher and later a social worker. She has two brothers, David Goodman and Steven N. Goodman. Goodman's maternal grandfather was an Orthodox rabbi. Her maternal grandmother was born in Rivne, present day Ukraine.

Goodman graduated from Bay Shore High School in 1975. She attended Radcliffe College at Harvard University, took time off during which she studied at the College of the Atlantic in Bar Harbor, Maine, then returned, graduating with a degree in anthropology in 1984.

== Investigative journalism career ==
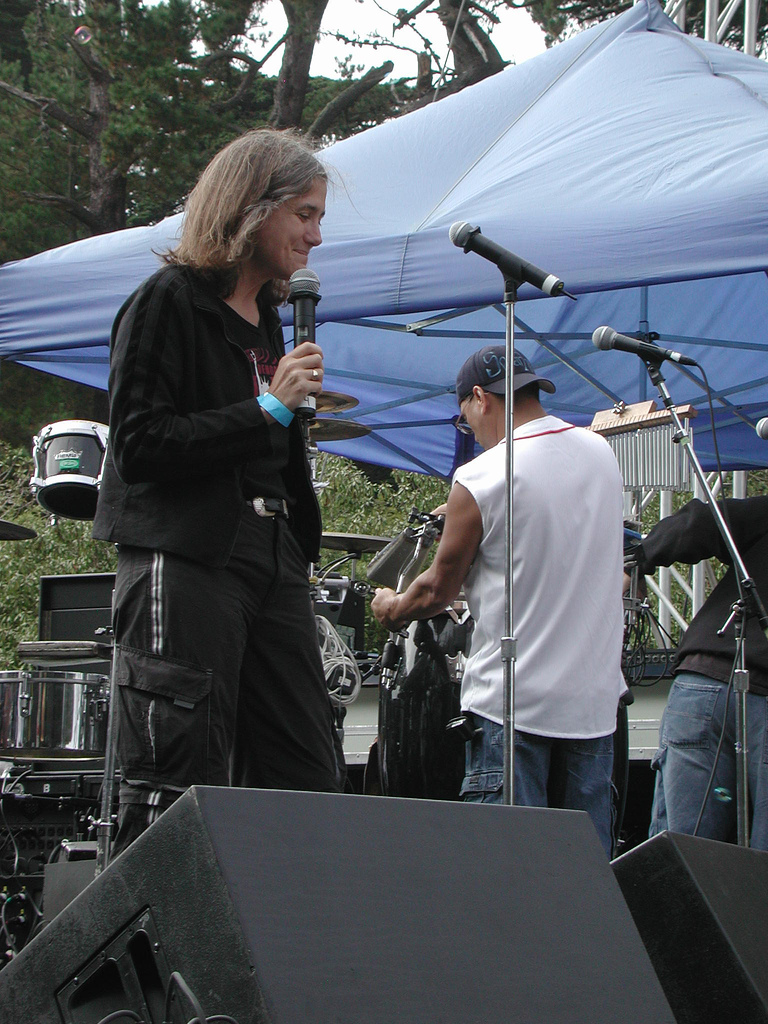
Goodman speaking at Power to the Peaceful Festival, San Francisco, 2004

Goodman produced the evening news program for WBAI, a Pacifica Radio community station in New York City, for 10 years. In 1991, covering the East Timor independence movement, Goodman and fellow journalist Allan Nairn reported that they were badly beaten by Indonesian soldiers after witnessing the Santa Cruz massacre, a mass killing of East Timorese pro-independence demonstrators during the US-backed Indonesian occupation of East Timor. Goodman and Nairn produced the award-winning 1992 radio documentary Massacre: The Story of East Timor, about the event, later set to video.

=== Democracy Now! ===
Goodman co-founded the program Democracy Now! The War and Peace Report, which premiered in 1996. Since then, Goodman has hosted and produced the program. It became a flagship of Pacifica Radio, which was founded by Lewis Hill in 1949. Democracy Now! has been described as "probably the most significant progressive news institution that has come around in some time" by professor and media critic Robert McChesney.

In 1998, Goodman and journalist Jeremy Scahill documented Chevron Corporation's role in a confrontation between the Nigerian Army and villagers who had seized oil rigs and other equipment belonging to oil corporations. Two villagers were shot and killed during the standoff. On May 28, 1998, the company provided helicopter transport to the Nigerian Navy and Mobile Police (MOPOL) to their Parabe oil platform, which had been occupied by villagers who accused the company of contaminating their land. Soon after landing, the Nigerian military shot and killed two of the protesters, Jola Ogungbeje and Aroleka Irowaninu, and wounded 11 others. Chevron spokesperson Sola Omole acknowledged that the company transported the troops. Omole said that Chevron management had requested troops from the government to protect their facility. The documentary made by Goodman and her colleagues, Drilling and Killing: Chevron and Nigeria's Oil Dictatorship, won the George Polk Award in 1998.

In 2000, amid conflicts regarding control of Pacifica that threatened the stability of the program's platform, Goodman negotiated greater independence for the program by pioneering a national, collaborative multimedia model to offer independent coverage of the political conventions of the 2000 United States presidential election. Democracy Now! thus expanded as a daily program broadcast across different media platforms, without advertisements and with support from foundations and listener contributions. Its website had 50,000 daily visits, its annual budget reached $1.8 million, and its staff grew to 27. Democracy Now! was dedicated to journalism in the style of George Seldes and Seymour Hersh.

=== Interview with President Clinton ===
When President Bill Clinton called WBAI on Election Day 2000 for a quick get-out-the-vote message, Goodman and WBAI's Gonzalo Aburto challenged him for 28 minutes with human rights questions about AIM activist Leonard Peltier, racial profiling, the Iraq sanctions, Ralph Nader, the death penalty, the North American Free Trade Agreement (NAFTA), the normalization of relations with Cuba, and the Israeli–Palestinian conflict. Clinton defended his administration's policies and said that Goodman was "hostile and combative".

=== Break with Pacifica Radio ===
In 2001, the show was temporarily pulled off the air, as a result of a conflict between some Pacifica Radio board members and staff members and listeners over the direction of the station. During that time, it moved to a converted firehouse, from which it broadcast from January 2002 for nearly eight years, until November 13, 2009. Democracy Now! subsequently moved to a studio located in the Chelsea neighborhood of Manhattan. Goodman credits the program's success to the "huge niche" left by coverage of mainstream media organizations. Michael Delli Carpini, dean of the Annenberg School for Communication, said of Goodman: "She's not an editorialist. She sticks to the facts... She provides points of view that make you think, and she comes at it by saying: 'Who are we not hearing from in the traditional media?'"

=== Arrest at 2008 Republican Convention ===
During the 2008 Republican National Convention in Saint Paul, Minnesota, several of Goodman's colleagues from Democracy Now! were arrested and detained by police while reporting on an anti-war protest outside the RNC. While trying to ascertain the status of her colleagues, Goodman was also arrested and held, accused of obstructing a legal process and interfering with a police officer. Fellow Democracy Now! producers, including reporter Sharif Abdel Kouddous, were held on charges of probable cause for riot. The arrests of the producers were videotaped. Goodman and her colleagues were later released, City Attorney John Choi indicated that the charges would be dropped. Goodman (et al.) filed a federal civil lawsuit against the St. Paul and Minneapolis police departments and the US Secret Service for the illegal arrests. The agencies reached a $100,000 settlement and agreed to educate officers about the First Amendment rights of members of the press and public.

=== British Columbia border crossing incident ===
On November 25, 2009, Goodman and her two colleagues, Denis Moynihan and Chuck Scurich, were detained for approximately 90 minutes by Canadian agents at the Douglas, British Columbia border crossing into Canada while en route to a scheduled meeting at the Vancouver Public Library. Immigration officials asked questions pertaining to the intended topics of discussion at the meeting. They wanted to know whether she would be speaking about the 2010 Olympic Games to be held in Canada. She and her colleagues were eventually permitted to enter Canada after the customs authorities took four photographs of her, inspected Scurich's computer, and stapled a "control document" into her passport; it required that she leave Canada within 48 hours.

=== 2016 North Dakota access pipeline protests ===
Goodman's Dakota Access Pipeline video report

In September 2016, Goodman covered the Dakota Access Pipeline protests in Morton County, North Dakota; footage from her reporting "showed security personnel pepper-spraying and siccing attack dogs on demonstrators." After Democracy Now! aired the footage, she was charged by state prosecutor Ladd Erickson with criminal trespass. After the court dismissed that charge, Erickson charged her with riot, gaining a warrant for her arrest. Erickson said that Goodman acted as "a protester" rather than a journalist, because "Everything she reported on was from the position of justifying the protest actions."

Goodman turned herself in to the Morton County sheriff on October 17, saying that she would be fighting the charges against her as a "clear violation" of the First Amendment, which guarantees freedom of the press. She was supported by the Committee to Protect Journalists, which issued a statement saying: "This arrest warrant is a transparent attempt to intimidate reporters from covering protests of significant public interest. [...] Authorities in North Dakota should stop embarrassing themselves, drop the charges against Amy Goodman, and ensure that all reporters are free to do their jobs." Steve Andrist, executive director of the North Dakota Newspaper Association, also expressed concern that a journalist was one of only two people covered by an arrest warrant from the day in question. Authorities said that Goodman was charged because she was identified from the video footage.

On October 17, 2016, the case was dismissed by District Judge John Grinsteiner, of the South Central Judicial District, who found no probable cause to support a riot charge. The charges against Goodman reportedly increased the public awareness of the Dakota Access Pipeline protests. Goodman had presented that day's Democracy Now! broadcast from in front of the Morton County Courthouse. Reporter Deia Schlosberg was arrested in similar circumstances while reporting on pipeline-related protests.

== Awards and honors ==
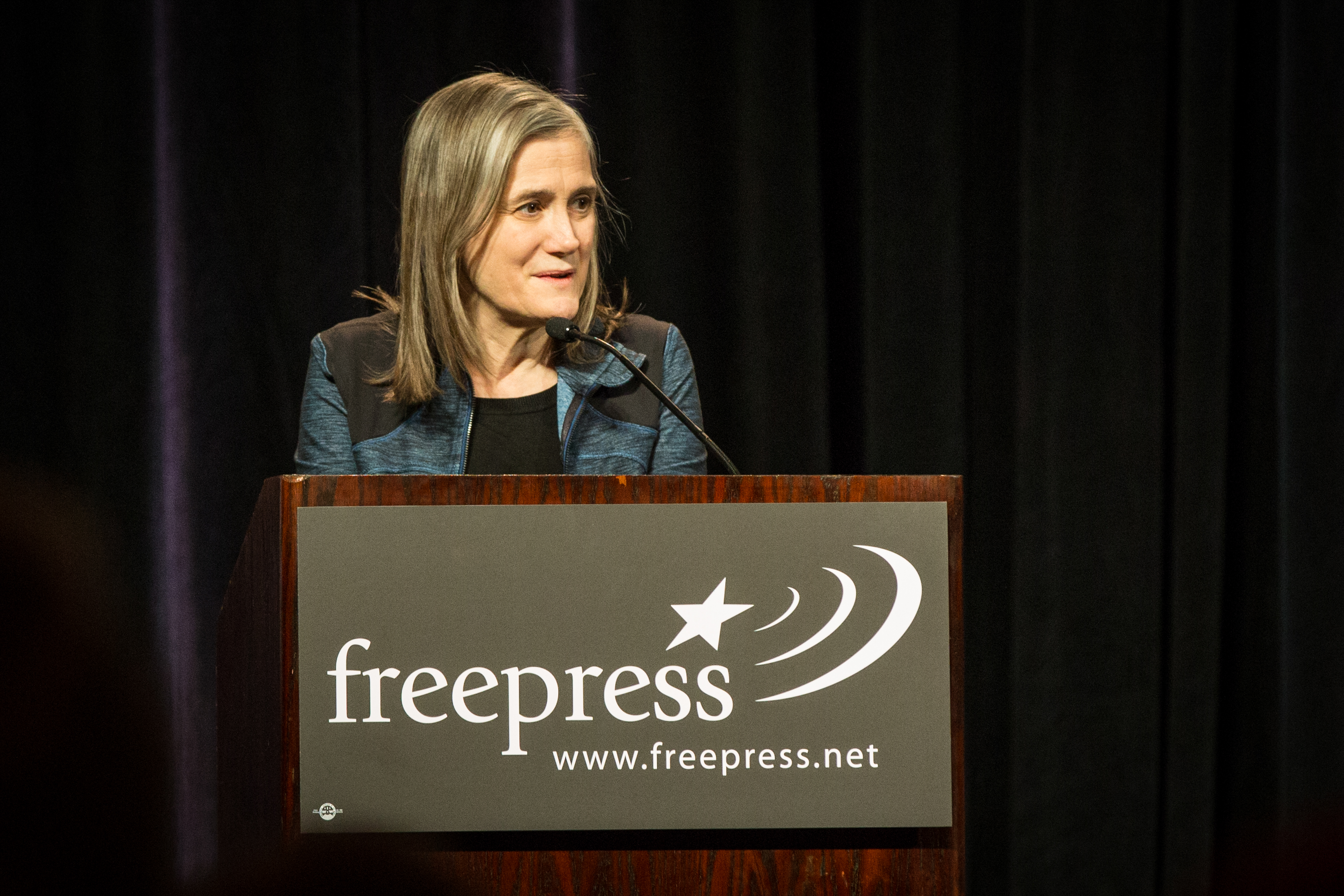
Democracy Now's Amy Goodman gives a keynote address at the 2013 National Conference for Media Reform in Denver, Colorado.

Goodman has received awards for her work, including the Robert F. Kennedy Prize for International Reporting (1993, with Allan Nairn) and the George Polk Award (1998, with Jeremy Scahill). In 1999, she declined to accept the Overseas Press Club Award, in protest at the group's pledge not to ask questions of keynote speaker Ambassador Richard Holbrooke and because the OPC was honoring Indonesia for its improved treatment of journalists despite the fact that its forces had recently beaten and killed reporters in occupied East Timor. She received the 2001 Joe A. Callaway Award for Civic Courage. On October 2, 2004, she was presented the Islamic Community Award for Journalism by the Council on American-Islamic Relations. On November 18, 2004, she was presented the Thomas Merton Award. In 2006, she received the Puffin/Nation Prize for Creative Citizenship.

Goodman was a recipient of the 2008 Right Livelihood Award. The Right Livelihood Award Foundation cited her work in "developing an innovative model of truly independent grassroots political journalism that brings to millions of people the alternative voices that are often excluded by the mainstream media". On March 31, 2009, Goodman, with Glenn Greenwald, received the first Izzy Award (named after journalist I. F. "Izzy" Stone) for "special achievement in independent media". The award is presented by Ithaca College's Park Center for Independent Media.

In May 2012, she received an honorary Doctor of Letters degree from DePauw University in recognition of her journalistic work. She also received the Gandhi Peace Award from Promoting Enduring Peace, for a "significant contribution to the promotion of an enduring international peace". On May 16, 2014, she received an honorary Doctor of Letters degree from Purchase College, SUNY in recognition of her progressive journalism. In February 2015, she (and Laura Poitras) received the 2014 I.F. Stone Lifetime Achievement Award from the Nieman Foundation for Journalism at Harvard.

In 2016, Goodman and Democracy Now! (along with Laura Gottesdiener, John Hamilton and Denis Moynihan) received a Sigma Delta Chi Award for excellence in journalism from the Society of Professional Journalists in the category of Breaking News Coverage (Network/Syndication Service/Program Service) for their piece, "Standoff at Standing Rock: Epic Native resistance to Dakota Access Pipeline." On February 14, 2019, she, and others, received the Frederick Douglass 200 award and was honored at the Library of Congress in Washington, D.C. The Frederick Douglass 200 award is a project of the Frederick Douglass Family Initiatives and the Antiracist Research and Policy Center at American University in Washington D.C. In October 2023, the NY Peace Action Network recognized her with the William Sloane Coffin "Peacemaker Award". In 2024, Goodman received the Humanist of the Year Award from the American Humanist Association.

== Personal life ==
In September 2007, Goodman suffered a bout of Bell's palsy. She practices yoga. Goodman is vegan and has been vegetarian since her teenage years.

== Bibliography ==
- 2004 – The Exception to the Rulers: Exposing Oily Politicians, War Profiteers, and the Media That Love Them co-written with her brother, Mother Jones reporter David Goodman. ISBN 1-4013-0799-X
- 2006 – Static: Government Liars, Media Cheerleaders, and the People who Fight Back (also with David Goodman). She appeared on the Colbert Report on October 5, 2006, to promote the book. ISBN 1-4013-0293-9
- 2008 – Standing up to the Madness: Ordinary Heroes in Extraordinary Times (also with David Goodman) details the capabilities of ordinary citizens to enact change. Was on The New York Times Best Seller list. ISBN 1-4013-2288-3
- 2009 – Breaking the Sound Barrier (with a preface by journalist Bill Moyers), an anthology of columns written for King Features Syndicate. In her first piece she wrote: "My column will include voices so often excluded, people whose views the media mostly ignore, issues they distort and even ridicule." ISBN 1-931859-99-X
- 2012 – The Silenced Majority: Stories of Uprisings, Occupations, Resistance, and Hope ISBN 1-6084-6231-5
- 2016 – Democracy Now!: Twenty Years Covering the Movements Changing America (with David Goodman and Denis Moynihan) ISBN 978-1501123580

== Filmography ==
She is the subject of the Tia Lessin and Carl Deal documentary Steal This Story, Please!, which had its world premiere as the first screening in the DC/DOX film festival on June 12, 2025. She appeared in person at DC's Woolly Mammoth Theatre Company, along with the filmmakers, for a discussion after the screening. The documentary, by filmmakers Carl Deal and Tia Lessin, is scheduled to open at New York's IFC Center in April 2026. In 2006, Goodman narrated the film One Bright Shining Moment: The Forgotten Summer of George McGovern, a documentary chronicling the life and times of the retired Democratic politician George McGovern, focusing on his failed 1972 bid for the presidency.

== See also ==
- List of peace activists
- New Yorkers in journalism
