= Roldo Bartimole =

American journalist

- Born: April 5, 1933 (age 93); Bridgeport, Connecticut, U.S.
- Occupations: Journalist, Media critic
- Known for: Founder of Point of View newsletter; civic journalism in Cleveland
- Notable work: Point of View (1968–2000)
- Awards: Joe A. Callaway Award for Civic Courage (1991); Cleveland Journalism Hall of Fame (2004); Herrick Award (2024)
- Website: Cleveland Memory Archive

Roldo Bartimole (born April 5, 1933) is an American journalist. He was born in Bridgeport, Connecticut. He worked for a series of newspapers, including The Wall Street Journal and The Cleveland Plain Dealer, before founding his own newsletter, Point of View, in 1968. In 1991, he was the recipient of the second annual Joe A. Callaway Award for Civic Courage. Upon his induction in 2004 to the Cleveland Journalism Hall of Fame, Editor & Publisher described him as "Cleveland's most famous and iconoclastic media critic." He has been a critic of the Cleveland, Ohio, political scene since Point of View's founding and continues to report and comment on Cleveland politics today. In 2024, he received the Herrick Award from the Early Settlers Association of the Western Reserve for his contributions to Cleveland.

Bartimole wrote for various other publications, both online and offline, following his final issue of Point of View. Among them were The Cleveland Edition, the Cleveland Free Times, Cool Cleveland, and a blog, Have Coffee Will Write. He continued to report on and make observations about Cleveland politics. In 2018, he announced that he was retiring from journalism, but he began writing again for Have Coffee Will Write in 2019. In September 2021, he once again announced his retirement from journalism, and he began a retrospective collaboration with Cleveland Review of Books to republish his past essays.

== Point of View ==
Bartimole began publishing his political newsletter in 1968 following the assassination of the Rev. Martin Luther King, Jr. The bi-weekly newsletter, Point of View, ran for 32 years. At one point, more than 1,700 people subscribed to it. Politicians, social activists, journalists and members of the business community comprised much of the readership. He frequently wrote about Cleveland politician Dennis Kucinich, who would later be a candidate for President of the United States. At age 21, during his first campaign for public office in Cleveland, Kucinich told Bartimole he aspired to run for president someday. Point of View's subscriber base was at its peak when Kucinich was Mayor of Cleveland. Cleveland Review of Books began to republish selections from Bartimole's work after he announced his retirement in September 2021, including his article "Who Really Governs?"

== Forcible removal from Cleveland City Council chambers ==
Bartimole's coverage of Cleveland politics and especially his coverage of its city council made him a controversial figure at city hall. In 1981, Council President George Forbes, angered by an article Bartimole had written, ordered him to leave a city council caucus meeting that Forbes said was not a public meeting. Bartimole refused. Forbes then confronted Bartimole, grabbed him and forcibly ejected him from the hotel meeting room.
