= Bunny Greenhouse =

Former chief contracting officer and whistleblower

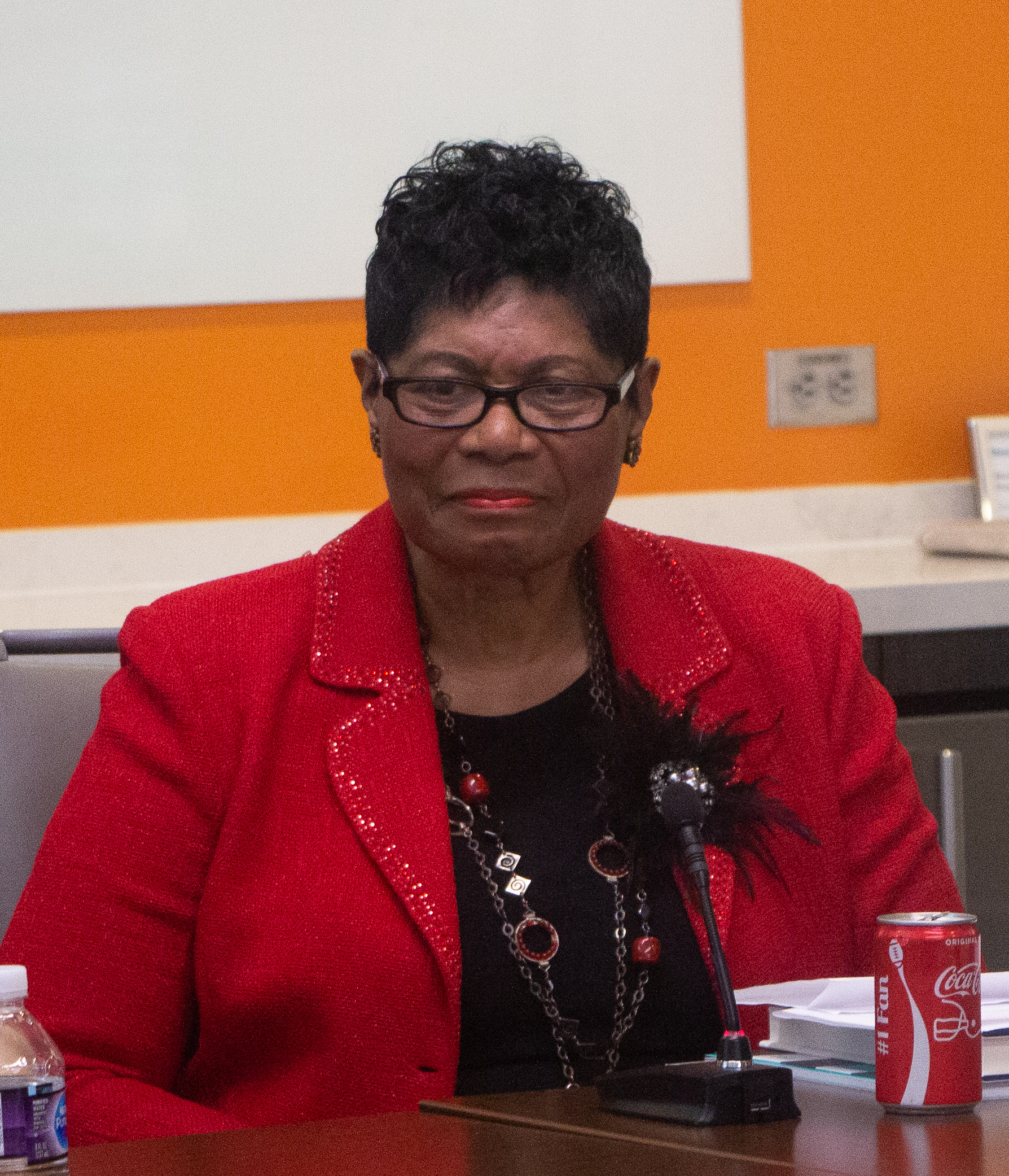
Greenhouse speaks at New America in 2019

Bunnatine (Bunny) H. Greenhouse is a former chief contracting officer Senior Executive Service (Principal Assistant Responsible for Contracting (PARC)) of the United States Army Corps of Engineers. On June 27, 2005, she testified to a Congressional panel, alleging specific instances of waste, fraud, and other abuses and irregularities by Halliburton with regard to its operations in Iraq since the 2003 invasion. She described one of the Halliburton contracts (secret, no-bid contracts awarded to Kellogg, Brown and Root (KBR)—a subsidiary of Halliburton) as "the most blatant and improper contract abuse I have witnessed during the course of my professional career".

A long-time government employee, Greenhouse was hired by Lieutenant General Joe Ballard in 1997 to oversee contracts at the Army Corps of Engineers. After Ballard retired in 2000, Greenhouse's performance reviews, which had been exemplary throughout her public career, suddenly soured. Greenhouse filed an Equal Employment Opportunity Commission (EEOC) complaint alleging race and gender discrimination, which her attorney states has never been investigated. In August 2005, she was demoted in what her lawyer called an "obvious reprisal" for her revelations about the Halliburton contracts.

On July 25, 2011, The U.S. District Court in Washington, DC approved awarding Greenhouse $970,000 in full restitution of lost wages, compensatory damages and attorney fees.

In June 2019, Greenhouse was featured on an episode of Whistleblower on CBS, named "Bunny's War: The Case Against the U.S. Army Corps of Engineers".

== Personal life ==
The valedictorian of her high school, Greenhouse earned a bachelor's degree in Mathematics from Southern University and master's degrees from the University of Central Texas, George Washington University, and the Industrial College of the Armed Forces. She is the elder sister of basketball Hall-of-Famer Elvin Hayes.

== See also ==
- Joe A. Callaway Award for Civic Courage
