= Cleveland Free Times =

Alternative weekly newspaper

- Type: Alternative weekly
- Format: Tabloid
- Owner: Kildysart LLC
- Publisher: Matt Fabyan
- Editor: Frank Lewis
- Founded: 1992; 33 years ago
- Ceased publication: 2008; 17 years ago
- Language: English
- Headquarters: 800 W. St. Clair Avenue; Second Floor; Cleveland, Ohio; United States
- Circulation: 75,000
- Website: www.freetimes.com

The Cleveland Free Times was an alternative weekly newspaper in Cleveland, Ohio. United States. Its first issue was published on September 30, 1992.

The Free Times and Cleveland Scene, a competing weekly paper, were purchased by Times-Shamrock Communications, located in Scranton, Pennsylvania, in June 2008. The Free Times published its final issue on July 16, 2008. It merged with Cleveland Scene.

Noteworthy staff members included Roldo Bartimole.
