= Dahr Jamail =

American journalist (born 1968)

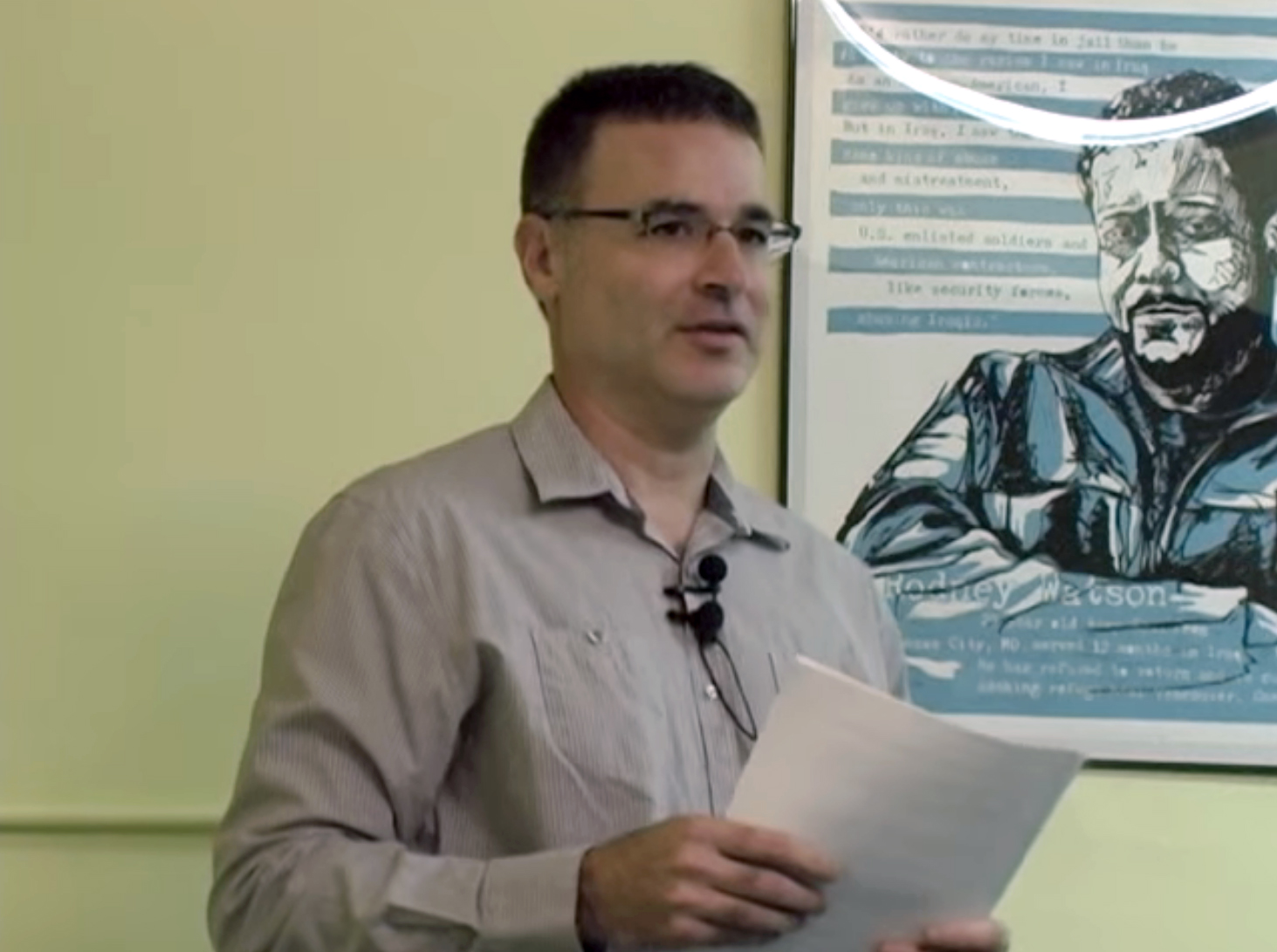
Dahr Jamail, 2015

Dahr Jamail (born 1968) is an American journalist who was one of the few unembedded journalists to report extensively from Iraq during the 2003 invasion of Iraq. He spent eight months in Iraq, between 2003 and 2005, and presented his stories on his website, entitled "Dahr Jamail's MidEast Dispatches." Jamail has been a reporter for Truthout and has also written for Al Jazeera. He has been a frequent guest on Democracy Now!, and is the recipient of the 2008 Martha Gellhorn Prize for Journalism. In 2018, the Izzy Award of the Park Center for Independent Media was awarded to Jamail, and shared by investigative reporters Lee Fang, Sharon Lerner, and author Todd Miller.

== Biography ==
Jamail is a fourth-generation Lebanese American, who was born and raised in Houston, Texas. He graduated from Texas A&M University and later moved to Alaska. In October 2007, his first book, Beyond the Green Zone, was published by Haymarket Books. Jamail embarked on a national speaking tour the same month that the book was released, first in New York City, where he and journalist Jeremy Scahill discussed the Afghan and Iraq wars. In 2007, he was awarded the Joe A. Callaway Award for Civic Courage.

Jamail's second book, The Will to Resist: Soldiers Who Refuse to Fight in Iraq and Afghanistan, was published in 2009.

His next book, The Mass Destruction of Iraq; The Disintegration of a Nation: Why It Is Happening, and Who Is Responsible, was co-authored in 2014 with William Rivers Pitt.

Dahr Jamail has written for Truthout about climate change issues since the early 2000s. In January 2019, he published the book, The End of Ice: Bearing Witness and Finding Meaning in the Path of Climate Disruption, about his mountaineering adventures where he witnessed glaciers melting, and grieving multiple aspects of climate change and catastrophe around the world.

In 2022, with Stan Rushworth, he edited We Are the Middle of Forever: Indigenous Voices From Turtle Island On the Changing Earth, a collection of interviews and conversations with indigenous people about climate change.

== Books ==
- Jamail, Dahr (October 2007). Beyond the Green Zone; Dispatches from an Unembedded Journalist in Occupied Iraq (Hardcover ed.). Haymarket Books. ISBN 9781931859479.
- Jamail, Dahr (July 2009). The Will to Resist; Soldiers Who Refuse to Fight in Iraq and Afghanistan (Hardcover ed.). Haymarket Books. ISBN 9781931859882.
- Pitt, William Rivers; Jamail, Dahr (2014). The Mass Destruction of Iraq; The Disintegration of a Nation: Why It Is Happening, and Who Is Responsible. Truthout.
- Jamail, Dahr (2019). The End of Ice (Hardcover ed.). New York: The New Press. ISBN 9781620972342.
- Jamail, Dahr; Rushworth, Stan (2022). We Are the Middle of Forever (Hardcover ed.). New York: The New Press. ISBN 978-1-62097-719-4.
