= Center for Tobacco Control Research and Education =

Research center in San Francisco, US

The Center for Tobacco Control Research and Education at the University of California, San Francisco, "serves as a focal point for a broad range of research, education, and public service activities for 46 faculty in 11 departments and all 4 schools at UCSF, as well as colleagues at UC Berkeley and UC Merced." It is part of the UCSF Cardiovascular Research Institute. The Center's director and principal investigator is Stanton Glantz, a Professor of Medicine in the Division of Cardiology at UCSF.

In 2013, the Center received a five-year, $20 million grant from the new Tobacco Centers of Regulatory Science (TCORS) program under the US Food and Drug Administration (FDA), one of 14 US institutions funded to develop a science-based approach to tobacco regulation.
