= Agbami Field =

Oil field in Nigeria

Agbami field
- Country: Nigeria
- Offshore/onshore: Offshore
- Operators: Star Deep Water
- Partners: Chevron, Famfa Oil, Petrobras, Statoil, NNPC

Field history
- Discovery: 1998
- Start of production: 2008

Production
- Current production of oil: 140,000 barrels per day (~7.0×10^{6} t/a)
- Peak of production (oil): 250,000 barrels per day (~1.2×10^{7} t/a)
- Estimated oil in place: 400 million tonnes (~ 500×10^{6} m^{3} or 3,000 million bbl)
- Recoverable oil: 900 million barrels (~1.2×10^{8} t)
- Producing formations: Lower and middle Miocene deepwater turbiditic sandstones

Agbami Field is an oil field in Nigeria. Discovered in late 1998, it was the second major deepwater oil field discovered off the Niger Delta, the first being Bonga Field by Shell.

The field is located in nearly 1,500 meters (4,900 ft) of water off the central Niger Delta. The operator of the field is Star Deep Water Limited, an affiliate of Chevron. Also involved in the field are Famfa Oil, an indigenous oil company owned by the Alakija Family of Lagos, Petrobras (Brazil), Statoil, and NNPC (the national oil company of Nigeria).

== Geology ==
Most of the reserves are in lower and middle Miocene deepwater turbiditic sandstones and reserves are estimated at 900 MM barrels with upside to perhaps 1.5 B making it either the biggest or second biggest (to Bonga) deepwater field in Nigeria. Its crude oil quality is high API gravity in the high 40s (very flowable) and the crude is sweet (low sulfur). The trap is mainly anticlinal 4-way rollover but internally the doubly plunging anticline is cored by a small reverse fault and upwardly diapiric mobile shale or mud. The northwestern portion of the field is overthrusted at shallow levels.

== Production ==
Production began in 2008 at over 70,000 barrels per day (11,000 m^{3}/d) with peak production estimated to be at approximately 250,000 bls/d. The Floating Production unit is the length of three football fields and cost over $US1.2 billion to build.

== Philanthropy ==
The Agbami scholarship scheme is fully sponsored by all companies involved in the Agbami oil field. The scheme pays engineering students ₦100,000 while medical and pharmacy students get paid ₦200,000 on some selected conditions. The scholarship is administered by dragnet-solutions.
