= Folorunso Alakija =

Nigerian businesswoman (born 1951)

Chief Folorunso Alakija
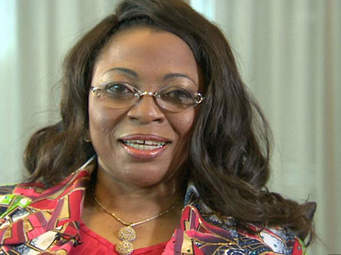
- Born: Folorunso Alakija; July 15, 1951 (age 75); Ikorodu, Lagos State, Nigeria
- Citizenship: Nigeria
- Education: Pitman Central College, London; American College in London; Central School of Fashion, London
- Occupations: Businesswoman, philanthropist
- Years active: 1974–present
- Known for: Co-founder of Famfa Oil; Rose of Sharon Group; fashion entrepreneurship; philanthropy
- Title: Executive Vice Chairman, Famfa Oil
- Board member of: Famfa Oil Limited; Rose of Sharon Group
- Spouse: Modupe Folorunso Alakija
- Children: 4
- Awards: Forbes Power Women listing (2014); Various honorary doctorates
- Website: www.folorunsoalakija.com

Chief Folorunso Alakija (born 15 July 1951) is a Nigerian businesswoman and philanthropist. She is the group managing director of the Rose of Sharon Group and executive vice chairman of Famfa Oil Limited.

== Early life ==
Alakija was born into a middle-class family in Nigeria on 15 July 1951. Her father, Chief L.A. Ogbara, had 8 wives and 52 children, and Folorunso's mother was his first. She is from the Yoruba ethnicity of south-western Nigeria.

At the young age, Folorunso Alakija travelled to the United Kingdom, where she began her primary education at Dinorben School for Girls in Wales before later returning to Nigeria for her secondary schooling.

She later returned to the United Kingdom for further studies in secretarial administration at Pitman Central College, London, and subsequently pursued training in fashion design at institutions in London.

Biographical accounts consistently describe her early education as beginning in the United Kingdom during childhood, a period which preceded her return to Nigeria for secondary education at Muslim High School, Sagamu.

== Career ==
In 1974, Alakija began working as an executive secretary at Sijuade Enterprises in Lagos. She later held positions at the First National Bank of Chicago and the International Merchant Bank of Nigeria.

Alakija then studied fashion design at the American College in London and the Central School of Fashion. She started a fashion label called Supreme Stitches, renamed in 1996 as the Rose of Sharon House of Fashion. She served as the president of the Fashion Designers Association of Nigeria (FADAN) and remains a trustee of the organization.

In May 1993, Alakija applied for the allocation of an oil prospecting license (OPL). The license to explore for oil on a 617,000-acre block, about 100 km offshore of Nigeria, in the Agbami Field, was granted to her company, Famfa Limited. In September 1996, Alakija entered into a joint venture agreement with Star Deep Water Petroleum Limited, transferring a 40 percent stake to Star Deep. After they struck oil, the Nigerian government claimed a 40% stake, followed by an additional 10%. The Nigerian government subsequently sought to acquire a 50% interest in the block; Alakija contested this acquisition in court and the Supreme Court ruled in her favor in 2012.

== Recognition ==
In 2014, Forbes ranked Alakija as the 96th most powerful woman in the world. As of 2021, she was the wealthiest woman in Africa with an estimated net worth of $1 billion.

In July 2021, Benson Idahosa University, Benin City, conferred on her an honorary doctorate degree. Chrisland University, Abeokuta, Ogun State, in November 2022, gave Alakija an honorary doctorate.

== Chancellor of Osun State University (2016 – 2026) ==
Folorunso Alakija served as Chancellor of Osun State University (UNIOSUN) from 2016 to 2026, following her appointment by the Osun State Government.

She was reappointed in 2021 for a second five-year term after completing her initial tenure, in line with the university’s statutory provisions for the office of Chancellor.

During her tenure, she served as the ceremonial head of the university and presided over convocation ceremonies and official academic events, as required of chancellors in Nigerian public universities.

Her tenure ended on 18 March 2026 after completing two terms in office. The Osun State Government and university authorities publicly acknowledged her contributions to the institution’s development during her decade-long service.

She was succeeded as Chancellor of Osun State University by entrepreneur Victoria Adunola Samson in May 2026, following an announcement by the Osun State Government.

== Wealth and Influence ==
Folorunso Alakija has been consistently ranked among Africa’s wealthiest women by Forbes, with her net worth largely derived from her stake in Famfa Oil, which holds a significant interest in the Agbami offshore oil field operated in partnership with international oil companies such as Chevron.

Her wealth has been estimated at around US$1 billion in various Forbes rankings, although her position among global billionaires has fluctuated in recent years due to changes in oil prices and valuation of upstream assets in Nigeria’s petroleum sector.

In 2014, Forbes ranked her among the 100 most powerful women in the world, placing her as one of the highest-ranked African women on the list at the time.

Alakija’s wealth has also been widely reported in Nigerian and international media, particularly in relation to her business holdings in oil, real estate, printing, and fashion through the Rose of Sharon Group and affiliated companies.

Beyond her business interests, she has used her wealth for large-scale philanthropic activities through the Rose of Sharon Foundation, which provides scholarships, business grants, and support for widows and orphans across Nigeria. The foundation has been reported to have reached thousands of beneficiaries since its establishment in 2008.

In addition, she has funded educational and vocational initiatives, including the donation of a skills acquisition centre to Yaba College of Technology in Lagos, designed to support training in technical and entrepreneurial skills.

In 2025, she funded and donated the Modupe and Folorunsho Alakija Medical Research and Training Hospital to Osun State University, a large teaching hospital project aimed at improving medical education and healthcare delivery in Nigeria.

== Philanthropy ==
Alakija established the Rose of Sharon Foundation, which provides scholarships and business grants to widows and orphans

She donated a skills acquisition center to Yaba College of Technology (Yabatech), a higher educational institution located in Lagos.

In 2025, Alakija funded and donated the Modupe and Folorunso Alakija Medical Research and Training Hospital to Osun State University, a 250-bed teaching hospital reportedly valued at ₦34 billion.

The facility comprises 20 clinical departments, five non-clinical departments, and a community health unit. It also provides maternity and neonatal care services, research and diagnostic laboratories, and four operating theatres. Its diagnostic services include imaging facilities such as CT scan, MRI, ultrasound, and X-ray, as well as radiotherapy suites. In addition, the hospital has 16 intensive care units, an ophthalmology unit, and several other specialized units aimed at supporting healthcare delivery and research activities.

== Personal life ==
Alakija married Modupe Alakija in November 1976. They reside in Lagos, Nigeria, with their four sons. In June 2017, their son, Folarin Alakija, married Iranian model Nazanin Jafarian Ghaissarifar.
