= Pat Gish =

American journalist and publisher (1927–2014)

- Born: Patricia Ann Burnett; January 11, 1927; Paris, Kentucky
- Died: April 13, 2014 (aged 87); Whitesburg, Kentucky
- Occupations: Newspaper reporter, editor and publisher; rural housing developer
- Years active: 1947–2001
- Known for: Rural housing activism
- Notable work: The Mountain Eagle, Eastern Kentucky Housing Development Corporation
- Spouse: Tom Gish (married 1948–2008 (his death))
- Awards: Hugh M. Hefner First Amendment Award, 1983; Joe A. Calloway Award for Civic Service, 1991; Environmental Policy Institute's Recognition for Coverage of Coalfields Issues, 1987; Pat and Tom Gish Award, 2005

Pat Gish (January 11, 1927 – April 13, 2014) was an American journalist, publisher and co-editor of the Whitesburg, Kentucky, newspaper The Mountain Eagle, along with her husband, Tom Gish. The Gishes led The Mountain Eagle in covering controversial topics such as the effects of strip mining on the Appalachian environment and political corruption. Under the Gishes' guidance, The Mountain Eagle became a prominent rural newspaper, and the pair won many awards for their journalism. Gish also founded the Eastern Kentucky Housing Development Corporation and worked to improve living conditions in Eastern Kentucky.

== Early life and education ==
Gish was born Patricia Ann Burnett in Paris, Kentucky, to Georgia and Elmer Burnett. She began working in journalism early; she had her first job at age thirteen working as a proof reader for a small daily newspaper in Danville, Illinois. Gish later moved to Lexington, Kentucky, and graduated from Lafayette High School and later studied journalism at the University of Kentucky. While in college, Gish worked with her campus newspaper The Kentucky Kernel and met her future husband, Tom. In addition to serving as editor of The Kernel, she worked part-time as a proofreader for the afternoon Lexington Leader, which merged into the Lexington Herald-Leader in 1984. Gish worked full- or part-time with the Lexington Leader between the ages of 15, when she was accepted the job as proofreader, and 30, when she left her job as assignment reporter to enter the weekly newspaper business. She married Tom Gish in Lexington in 1948 and graduated from college in 1949. In 1970, Gish acquired a Masters of Science in Community Development from the University of Louisville.

== The Mountain Eagle ==
Pat and Tom Gish bought The Mountain Eagle from Pearl and Martha Nolan in November 1956 and took over editing the paper, and published their first issue on January 1, 1957. They changed the paper's motto from "A Friendly Non-Partisan Weekly Newspaper Published Every Thursday" to "It Screams". Under their leadership, The Mountain Eagle for the first time reported on the inner workings of the Letcher County government, which often caused controversy within the community and friction between the paper and city government officials. They covered controversial regional issues, such as meetings of the local school board and fiscal court which were previously held behind closed doors, strip mining, and mine safety abuses in the Appalachian coal industry. They also covered stories on a wide range of problems, including corruption, poor education, inadequate housing and poverty, though Al Cross, director of the Institute for Rural Journalism and Community Issues, said they were protective of their readers' dignity, refusing to run photos of poor people.

Their work reached both a regional and national audience, leading to changes in legislation and inspiring journalists and activists who supported the War on Poverty and increased environmental awareness. The Gishes' work often caused controversy within their community, prompting reactions from the public such as advertising boycotts and, in August 1974, a firebombing of their publication facilities.

It was discovered that a local police officer paid to have the building burned after The Mountain Eagle published an article addressing unfair treatment of local youths by the Letcher County police. Tom Gish also reported that he believed a local coal company contributed funds to the arson as well. In reaction to this incident, the Gishes changed the motto of the paper from "It Screams" to "It Still Screams".

The couple was also notable for publishing the works of opinion columnists, especially women opinion columnists, from other communities in Eastern Kentucky, including the writing of Mabel Kiser, Thelma Cornett, Siller Brown, Sarah Ison, Elsie Banks, and Gaynell Begley.

Although the couple worked as a team, Tom freely admitted that "without Pat, The Mountain Eagle would have gone under long ago." Within The Mountain Eagle, Pat did most of the reporting, editing, and business aspects of the company. In addition to this work, she also was the "founder and director of a federally funded affordable housing initiative" " This additional job required Pat to drive to Louisville on the weekends for two years to earn her Master's degree. On top of all that, Pat also was a full-time mother of five children. As stated by Mike Clark, a former Eagle staffer, she was the "best multi-tasking saint of an editor, housing expert, wife and mother I have ever known...How Pat balanced all those roles without sleep or peace or rest is beyond me."

Pat and Tom were highly praised and respected for reporting "the real news, regardless of whether it was either profitable or popular — and despite considerable risk to both life and livelihood". Throughout their career in journalism, the duo worked hand in hand to publish accurate and trustworthy news, "regardless of the consequences".

== Eastern Kentucky Housing Development Corporation ==
In 1968, Pat Gish founded the Eastern Kentucky Housing Corp. The program was responsible for the implementation of programs that served to alleviate the struggles of low income families in Eastern Kentucky and Appalachia, as well as the construction of low income housing throughout the region. Pat even partnered with Yale Architecture School, employing students to help design housing affordable for the natural difficulties of Eastern Kentucky's landscape. The organization made use of funding from the Office of Economic Opportunity, Department of Agriculture, Department of Health, Education and Welfare, and Department of Labor funds. However, in the 1980s the federal support of these housing programs was heavily reduced. With this new development, Pat decided to oversee the merger of the EKHCDH and another similar organization, allowing her to return to a full-time position at The Eagle.

== Later life and death ==
In 2001, Pat's son Ben Gish took over as editor of The Mountain Eagle, due to the declining health of Pat and Tom. Gish was diagnosed with Alzheimer's disease in the early 2000s. She succumbed to complications from Alzheimer's on April 13, 2014.

== Awards and recognition ==
In 1983, Pat and Tom received the Hugh M. Hefner First Amendment Award for "outstanding community leadership". In 1985, the Gishes were acknowledged jointly in Newsweek magazine as two of its "100 American Heroes". In 1986, the Gishes were inducted into the Mountain Heritage Hall of Fame and the Kentucky Journalism Hall of Fame. In 1987, the Gishes received the Environmental Policy Institute award for their work in promoting the environmental rights of the Appalachian region. In 1991, the Ralph Nader organization awarded the Gishes with the Joe A. Callaway Award for Civic Courage. In 1993, the Lexington Herald-Leader awarded the Gishes with the Edwards M. Templin Award for Community Service. The couple also donated land for a community park.

The University of Kentucky Institute for Rural Journalism and Community Issues instituted in 2005 the Tom and Pat Gish Award in honor of the pair. The award is to be given to "rural journalists who demonstrate courage, tenacity and integrity often needed to render public service through journalism". The Gishes were the first recipients of the award on February 28, 2005.
