= Allan Nairn =

American journalist (born 1956)

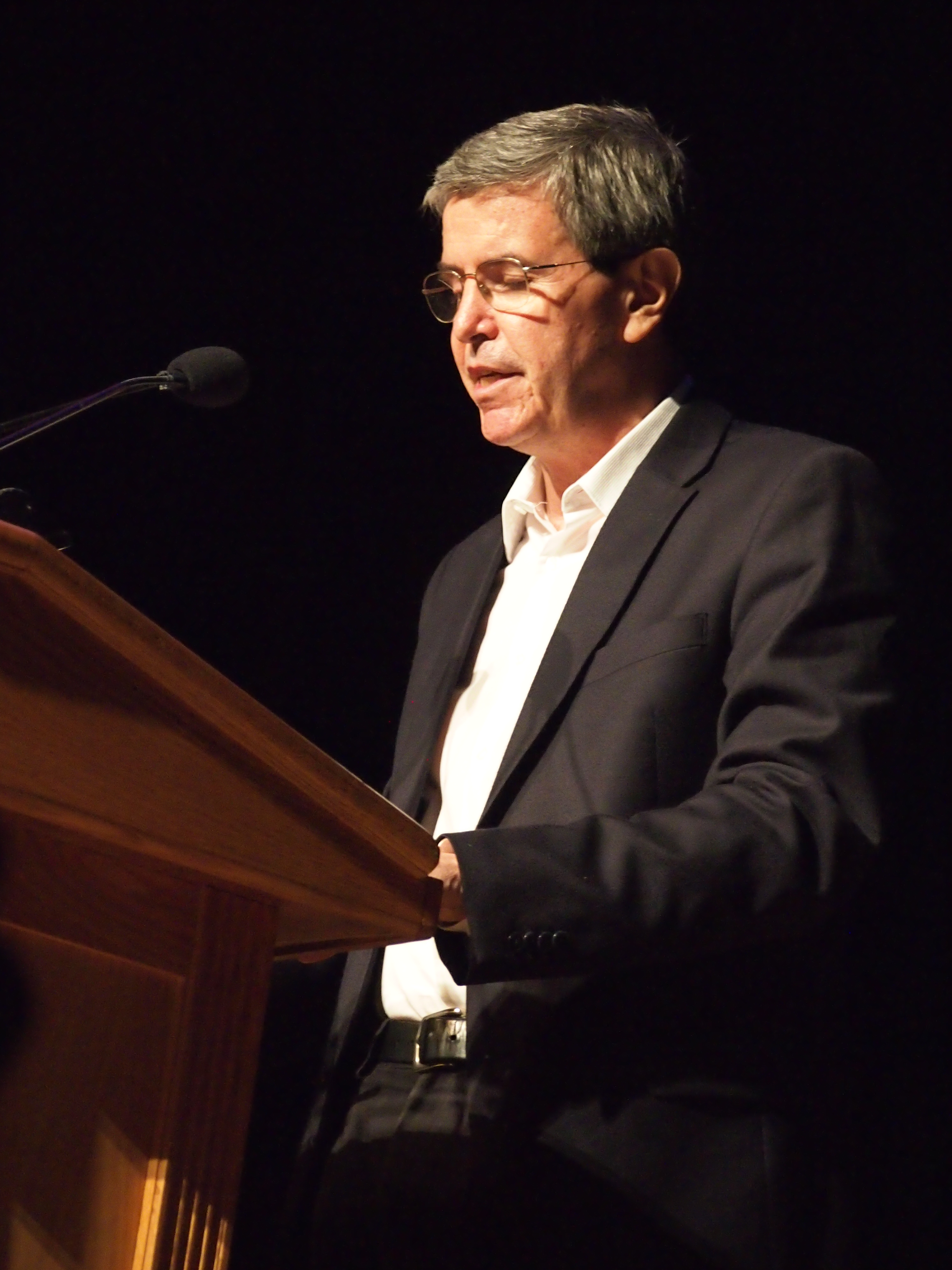
- Born: 1956 (age 69–70); Morristown, New Jersey, United States
- Occupations: Journalist; Reporter; Author
- Notable work: East Timor's Unfinished Struggle (1999); Our Kind of Guys (1999)
- Awards: Robert F. Kennedy Journalism Award (1993); George Polk Award (1994); James Aronson Award (1994); Joe A. Callaway Award for Civic Courage (1994)
- Website: allannairn.org

Allan Nairn (born 1956) is an American investigative journalist. He was imprisoned by Indonesian military forces under United States-backed strongman Suharto while reporting in East Timor. His writings have focused on U.S. foreign policy in such countries as Haiti, Guatemala, Indonesia, and East Timor.

== Biography and career ==
Nairn was born in Morristown, New Jersey to a Puerto Rican mother. In high school, he got a job with consumer activist Ralph Nader, working for him for six years. His book The Reign of ETS: the Corporation That Makes up Minds, an investigation of the SAT I exam and its creators, the Educational Testing Service, was printed as part of the Ralph Nader report in 1980.

In 1980 Nairn visited Guatemala in the middle of a campaign of assassination against student leaders amidst a chaotic counterinsurgency campaign against Marxist guerrillas active in both urban and rural areas. He interviewed United States corporate executives there, who endorsed the death squads, and he decided to further investigate death squad activities in that country and in El Salvador, also in the throes of civil war. Subsequently, Nairn became interested in East Timor and helped found the East Timor Action Network (ETAN), which was instrumental in bringing the independence movement in East Timor to international attention.

On November 12, 1991, covering developments in East Timor, Nairn and fellow journalist Amy Goodman were badly beaten by Indonesian soldiers after they witnessed a mass killing of Timorese demonstrators in what became known as the Santa Cruz Massacre. He was beaten with the butts of M16 rifles and had his skull fractured in the melee. Nairn was declared a "threat to national security" and banned from East Timor, but he re-entered several times illegally, and his subsequent reports helped convince the U.S. Congress to cut off military aid to Jakarta in 1993. In a dispatch from East Timor on March 30, 1998, Nairn disclosed the continuing U.S. military training of Indonesian troops implicated in the torture and killing of civilians. In 1999, Nairn was detained briefly by the Indonesian Army in East Timor, where he had chosen to remain after most other media had evacuated following East Timor's independence referendum.

In an article published in The Nation in 1994 Nairn revealed the U.S. government's role in establishing and funding the Haitian paramilitary, Front for the Advancement and Progress of Haiti (FRAPH) which was involved in human rights abuses.

On March 24, 2010, it was revealed that Nairn could be facing possible detention and criminal charges in Indonesia for revealing Indonesian military assassinations of civilian activists. An Indonesian Military spokesperson told the Jakarta Globe that the military is considering legal actions against Nairn's publication.

In June 2013 Nairn and numerous other celebrities appeared in a video showing support for Chelsea Manning.

A June 27, 2014 report indicated that Nairn had been threatened with arrest for revealing the role of Indonesian presidential candidate Prabowo Subianto in human rights abuses.

On April 19, 2017, the Intercept published an exposé researched and written by Nairn warning that a cadre of Indonesian military officers had joined forces with an ISIS-affiliated "vigilante street movement" in order to unseat President Joko Widodo.

== Awards ==
In 1993 Nairn and Amy Goodman received the Robert F. Kennedy Memorial First Prize for International Radio award for their reporting on East Timor. In 1994, Nairn won the George Polk Award for Journalism for Magazine Reporting. Also in 1994, Nairn received the James Aronson Award for Social Justice Journalism for his writing on Haiti for The Nation magazine. He was a recipient of the 1994 Joe A. Callaway Award for Civic Courage.
