= Bonga Field =

Oilfield in Nigeria

Bonga oil field
- Country: Nigeria
- Block: OML 118 (formerly OPL 212)
- Offshore/onshore: Offshore
- Operator: Shell Nigeria
- Partners: Shell; ExxonMobil; TotalEnergies; Eni

Field history
- Discovery: 1996
- Start of production: November 2005
- Abandonment: 2022 (Estimated)

Production
- Current production of oil: 202,000 barrels per day (~1.01×10^{7} t/a)
- Year of current production of oil: 2006
- Current production of gas: 144×10^{6} cu ft/d (4.1×10^{6} m^{3}/d)
- Estimated oil in place: 965 million tonnes (~ 1×10^{9} m^{3} or 6000 million bbl)
- Recoverable oil: 1,470,000 million barrels (~2.01×10^{11} t)
- Producing formations: Middle to Late Miocene unconsolidated turbidite sandstones

The Bonga Field is an oilfield in Nigeria. It was located in License block OPL 212 off the Nigerian coast, which was renamed OML 118 in February 2000. The field covers approximately 60 km^{2} in an average water depth of 1,000 metres (3,300 ft). The field was discovered in 1996, with government approval for its development given in 2002. The field began first production in November 2005. The field is worked via an FPSO vessel. The field produces both petroleum and natural gas; the petroleum is offloaded to tankers while the gas is piped back to Nigeria where it is exported via an LNG plant. The field contains approximately 6,000 MM barrels of oil.

The field is operated by Shell Nigeria who own 55% of the license. The other partners in the field development are ExxonMobil (20%), Nigerian Agip (12.5%) and Elf Aquitaine (12.5%).

== Field history ==
Located 120 kilometres (75 mi) southwest of the Niger Delta, the first discovery well was spudded in September 1995 after acquiring extensive information about the block via a 3D seismic survey in 1993/94.

A secondary field was discovered in the block in May 2001 known as Bonga SW, which encountered significant hydrocarbons. A third field was discovered later in 2004 which is known as Bonga North.

== Field development and FPSO ==
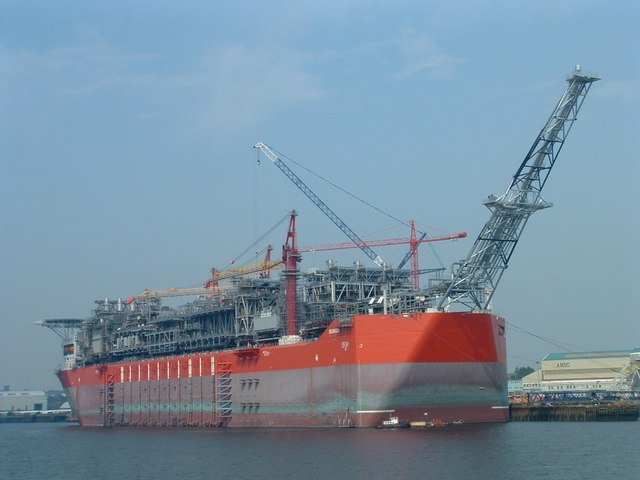
The Bonga FPSO

The field has been produced as a subsea tie back to a Floating Production Storage and Offloading vessel (FPSO) ('The Bonga FPSO'). The FPSO was built by Samsung Heavy industries. It was then taken to Newcastle upon Tyne for installation of the process topsides. It contained a number of firsts for its type. The SURF (Subsea, Umbilicals, Risers, Flowlines) contract was won by Stolt Offshore (later renamed Acergy and now Subsea7). Stolt vessel POLARIS installed all the flowlines and subsea structures in J-Lay and S-Lay pipelay modes. The processing equipment processes some 225,000 barrels of stabilised crude oil per day at a maximum tank temperature of 60°C.

Currently there are 16 oil producing and water injection wells on the field. However, this will be increased to nearly 40 wells as the field is developed further. Oil produced from the field is stored on the FPSO for transport to markets via tankers while the gas is exported via a pipeline to the Nigerian Coast for LNG.

Production at the well was shut down for three weeks after 19 June 2008, after an attack by the Movement for the Emancipation of the Niger Delta.

== 2011 oil spill ==
On 20 December 2011 an oil spill occurred that "likely was less than 40,000 barrels, or 1.68 million gallons [6.4 megalitres]". It resulted in an oil slick 185 km (115 mi) long off the Nigerian coast. It was probably the worst spill in the area for a decade. Oil spills have the potential to cause great damage to the environment, for example water pollution, which reduces fishing yields and agriculture, which is one of Nigeria's largest industries.

== 2024 reinvestment ==
Shell made a final investment decision (FID) on the Bonga North deep-water project, located off the coast of Nigeria in December 2024. This project is a significant investment, expected to sustain oil and gas production at the Bonga facility.

The Bonga North project involves drilling and completing 16 wells, modifying the existing Bonga Main FPSO facility, which produced its one-billionth barrel in 2023, and installing new subsea hardware. The project is estimated to have a recoverable resource volume of over 300 million barrels of oil equivalent (boe) and is expected to reach a peak production of 110,000 barrels of oil per day. The development project is expected to cost approximately $5bn USD.

This investment decision was a significant milestone for Shell's operations in Nigeria and is expected to generate an internal rate of return (IRR) in excess of the hurdle rate for Shell's Upstream business.

== See also ==
- Petroleum industry in Nigeria
- Natural gas
- Oilfield
