= Tom Gish =

American newspaper reporter and editor

- Born: January 28, 1926; Seco, Kentucky, U.S.
- Died: November 21, 2008 (aged 82); Whitesburg, Kentucky, U.S.
- Education: University of Kentucky
- Occupations: Newspaper reporter and editor
- Spouse: Pat Gish
- Writing career
- Notable work: The Mountain Eagle
- Notable awards: Zenger Award, 1974; Hugh M. Hefner First Amendment Award, 1983; Environmental Policy Institute's Recognition for Coverage of Coalfields Issues, 1987; Helen Thomas Lifetime Achievement Award, 2002

Tom Gish (January 28, 1926 – November 21, 2008) was an American newspaper reporter and editor, best known for his work as the owner and co-editor of The Mountain Eagle weekly newspaper alongside his wife, Pat Gish, in Whitesburg, the county seat of Letcher County, Kentucky, where his paper was the first in the eastern part of the state to challenge the damage caused to the environment resulting from strip mining.

== Early life and education ==
Gish was a native of Seco, a coal camp near Whitesburg. He met his wife Pat while the two attended the University of Kentucky, where they both worked on The Kentucky Kernel, the school's student publication. Before purchasing the newspaper in 1956, Gish was the bureau chief in Frankfort, Kentucky for United Press International. His wife had been a reporter for The Lexington Leader (which later merged to become the Lexington Herald-Leader).

== Owner/editor of The Mountain Eagle ==
After purchasing the newspaper, the motto was changed from "A Friendly Non-Partisan Weekly Newspaper Published Every Thursday" to "It Screams".

For a period of time, the newspaper's reporters were banned from attending school board and fiscal court meetings. Their efforts to ensure that they could attend and keep those meetings available to the public and press led to passage of Kentucky's open meeting and open records legislation.

An August 1974 firebombing destroyed $17,000 worth of the newspaper's equipment, doing only light structural damage to its facility, yet the local police department placed a condemnation order on the building. A police officer paid to have the building burnt down, after the paper had published articles criticizing treatment of youths by the local police force. Gish said that he had discovered that a coal company had funded the money to pay for the arson. The paper was published the next week, this time with the motto "It Still Screams". After several years of publishing under the masthead of "It Still Screams", the Mountain Eagle returned to its motto of "It Screams", which still remains in use.

The Mountain Eagle has a long history of advocating for coal mine safety and for the protection of the land and communities of eastern Kentucky from the impacts of strip mining.

== Honors ==
The Kentucky-based Institute for Rural Journalism and Community Issues created the Tom and Pat Gish Award in 2005 to recognize rural journalists who "demonstrate courage, tenacity and integrity." The Gishes were honored by the Society of Professional Journalists with the Helen Thomas Lifetime Achievement Award in 2002. They also received the Hugh M. Hefner First Amendment Award in 1983 and were profiled among "100 American Heroes" in a 1986 Special Issue of Newsweek. Pat and Tom were also profiled in Studs Terkel's 1983 book "American Dreams: Lost and Found" concerning their work as publishers of a small-town newspaper. Tom Gish received the Zenger Award from the University of Arizona in 1974 (between Katharine Graham of the Washington Post (1973) and Seymour Hersh of the New York Times (1975)). He was twice honored in the name of Elijah Parish Lovejoy—once from the University of Arizona (1975), and later from Colby College (2001). He also received the Environmental Policy Institute's Recognition for Coverage of Coalfields Issues in 1987.

Gish died at age 82 on November 21, 2008, after having experienced kidney failure and heart problems.
