= Drilling and Killing =

Audio documentary

Drilling and Killing: Chevron and Nigeria's Oil Dictatorship is an audio documentary produced by Amy Goodman and Jeremy Scahill, mixed and engineered by Dred Scott Keyes. The piece was first aired in 1998 on Democracy Now!

The documentary suggested the possibility for the first time that Chevron played a role in the killing of two Nigerian villagers by facilitating an attack by the Nigerian Navy and Mobile Police (MOPOL). As part of a movement by local people for social, economic and environmental justice in response to the significant degradation of the environment of the area in which they live and try to earn a living, local activists stage protests to raise awareness of their plight and to obtain some compensation for the costs they bear. In the documentary, spokespeople for Chevron and of its contractor explain that Chevron flew in Nigerian Mobile Police and Nigerian Navy personnel on helicopters to the protesters and paid extra for their time. These forces shot two protesters in May 1998 and kept dozens of others in shipping containers until they were finally arrested.

== Awards ==
- George Polk Award for Radio Reporting
- Overseas Press Club, The Lowell Thomas Award, (refused)

== See also ==
- Niger Delta shootings
