= Bowoto v. Chevron Corp. =

2008 Californian lawsuit by Nigerian citizens

Bowoto v. Chevron Corp. was a lawsuit against Chevron Nigeria Ltd., a subsidiary of Chevron USA, which went to trial in 2008 in the United States District Court for the Northern District of California. The plaintiffs, Nigerian citizens who had been injured during or who had survived human rights violations perpetrated by Nigerian military personnel, alleged that the Chevron subsidiary backed the military action and that the parent company thus should bear liability in US courts for the resultant fallout. The suit was decided on December 1, 2008, when nine jurors unanimously agreed Chevron was not liable for any of the numerous allegations. Judgment was entered the next day, officially exonerating Chevron.

== Background ==
During the late 1990s, Nigerian community organizers were protesting Chevron's regional business activities, alleging negative environmental and social impact. These organizers sought cessation of Chevron's conduct, reparations, and cleanup.

The Bowoto case stems from two incidents in which Chevron was alleged to have hired or provided assistance to Nigerian security forces confronting local citizens. At dispute in the case was Chevron's role in these incidents and whether this role could be tied to liability for resultant damages.

Between May 25 and 28, 1998, approximately 100 community protesters occupied the Parabe platform, a Chevron Nigeria-owned offshore drilling rig and construction barge located in the Niger delta. Chevron Nigeria was believed to have hired Nigerian government security agents to forcibly remove the protesters and to have provided the agents with Chevron-leased helicopters to transport their troops to and from the barge. The security forces allegedly shot four protesters, killing two, and captured and tortured a fifth. Chevron claimed the protesters were "kidnappers and extortionists who held 175 people hostage for three days while (Chevron Nigeria) vainly tried to negotiate with them."

On January 4, 1999, Nigerian government security forces launched an assault on the villages of Opia and Ikenyan, military personnel shooting civilians and setting fire to buildings. Chevron was alleged to have provided assistance to the Nigerian military forces in the form of helicopters and sea trucks piloted by Chevron Nigeria employees. Other accounts suggest Chevron hired the security forces and helped plan the attack on the villages in retaliation for the protesters' activities. (On March 12, 2008, the Botowo plaintiffs' attorneys voluntarily dismissed claims connected to Opia and Ikenyan due to fraud or conflict of interest.)

== Legal claims ==
With the assistance of several nonprofit organizations including the Center for Constitutional Rights, the Public Interest Lawyers Group, and EarthRights International , a group of victims and the relatives of some of those killed in the attacks filed suit against ChevronTexaco Corporation in 1999. The complaint alleged that "[t]he military, at the request of, and with the participation and complicity of Chevron, killed and injured people, destroyed churches, religious shrines and water wells; burned down homes, killed livestock; and destroyed canoes and fishing equipment belonging to villagers." The plaintiffs raised several federal claims under the Alien Tort Claims Act, the Torture Victim Protection Act of 1991, and the Racketeer Influenced and Corrupt Organizations Act (RICO). They also alleged California state law claims of wrongful death, assault, battery, intentional infliction of emotional distress and negligence per se, among others.

The first major ruling in the case came in 2004 when the district court denied Chevron's motion for summary judgment. The court held that the plaintiffs had supplied sufficient evidence that ChevronTexaco could be found responsible for the actions of its subsidiary. Therefore, the case could go forward to trial to determine if plaintiffs may pierce the corporate veil.

It was not until June 2005 that the plaintiffs and the court learned that ChevronTexaco failed to disclose that Chevron USA, Inc. rather than Chevron Overseas Petroleum Inc. controlled the subsidiary in Nigeria. This is significant because the plaintiffs were suing the wrong defendant. Presiding U.S. District Court Judge Susan Illston chided Chevron's attorneys for keeping silent, and intimated that they may have done so on purpose to delay or otherwise obstruct the plaintiffs' claims.

Judge Illston made a series of decisions in August 2006. First and foremost, she allowed the plaintiffs to make Chevron USA a defendant. She also granted the defendants' motion to dismiss the claims under the Torture Victim Protection Act and the Alien Tort Claims Act. However, the court allowed the international law claim of crimes against humanity to go forward temporarily. On August 13, 2007, however, Judge Illston dismissed the claim of crimes against humanity.

In March 2007, the court granted Chevron's motion for summary judgment on the plaintiffs' RICO claim. To win a RICO claim, the plaintiffs needed to show (1) conduct, (2) of an enterprise, (3) through a pattern, (4) of racketeering activity. The court found that the plaintiffs did not satisfy the first element; although they provided evidence that a significant amount of the oil extracted in Nigeria was exported to the United States, the plaintiffs did not provide enough evidence that the two incidents underlying this litigation or Chevron's treatment of the local communities had any impact on the U.S. economy.

On December 1, 2008, the jury delivered a complete defense verdict for Chevron. On September 10, 2010, the Ninth Circuit Court of Appeals upheld a jury verdict in favor of Chevron Corporation.

== Legal implications ==
Legal regulation of multinational corporations is difficult because they are not under the control of any one jurisdiction. Rather, they are subject to multiple legal systems, including the country of their corporate headquarters as well as the countries in which they operate. There is no international oversight body to regulate multinational corporations, or an international forum in which suit may be brought against multinational corporations. It can be difficult for domestic courts to hold multinational corporations responsible for jurisdictional reasons or because the particular government lacks the legal infrastructure to impose liability. An example of a jurisdictional shortcoming in the United States is the difficulty of piercing the corporate veil. It can be extremely difficult to hold a parent company liable for acts committed by its subsidiary. Bowoto v. Chevron Corp. is an example of the difficulties in suing a multinational corporation for alleged violations of human rights, and perhaps the need for more formal regulation and accountability of multinational corporations.
