= Stanton Glantz =

American scientist and anti-smoking activist (born 1946)

- Born: 1946 (age 79–80); Cleveland, Ohio
- Education: University of Cincinnati, Stanford University
- Known for: Research into health effects of tobacco and regulation of tobacco products
- Spouse: Marsha Glantz
- Children: Aaron and Frieda Glantz
- Awards: Elected to the Institute of Medicine in 2005
- Scientific career
- Fields: Cardiology, public health
- Workplaces: University of California, San Francisco
- Thesis: A mathematical approach to cardiac muscle physiology (1973)

Stanton Arnold Glantz (born 1946) is an American professor, author, and tobacco control activist. Glantz is a faculty member at the University of California, San Francisco (UCSF) School of Medicine, where he is a professor of medicine (retired) in the Division of Cardiology, the American Legacy Foundation Distinguished Professor of Tobacco Control, and former director of the Center for Tobacco Control Research and Education. Glantz's research focused on the health effects of tobacco smoking.

Described as the "Ralph Nader of the anti-tobacco movement," Glantz is an activist for nonsmokers' rights and an advocate of public health policies to reduce smoking. He is the author of four books, including The Cigarette Papers and Primer of Biostatistics. Glantz is also a member of the UCSF Cardiovascular Research Institute and Institute for Health Policy Studies, and co-leader of the UCSF Comprehensive Cancer Center Tobacco Program. He was elected to the Institute of Medicine in 2005.

In 2017, Glantz was sued by a former postdoctoral researcher for alleged sexual harassment and retaliation. While UCSF internally found that Glantz had "more likely than not" engaged in harassment and had violated the faculty code of conduct, Glantz and UCSF publicly denied the allegations and settled the lawsuit for $150,000. In 2018, a second former employee sued Glantz for harassment; Glantz and UCSF denied these allegations as well.

== Life and career ==
Glantz was the first of two children born in Cleveland, Ohio to Louis Glantz, an insurance salesman, and Frieda, a real estate broker. As a youth, Glantz took a great interest in the Soviet Union's Sputnik 1 satellite. He was a member of the Boy Scouts of America, where he achieved the top rank of Eagle Scout, and earned a Bronze Palm for further achievements.

Glantz obtained a B.Sc. in aerospace engineering from the University of Cincinnati in 1969, an M.Sc. in applied mechanics from Stanford University in 1970, and in 1973, a Ph.D. from Stanford in applied mechanics (concentrating on the mechanics of the human heart) and engineering-economic systems (EES is a Stanford department created in the late 1960s, integrating computers and engineering in "methods of systems and economic analysis to engineering problems involving policy and decision making, both in government and industry"). Concurrently with his studies, he worked at NASA's Manned Spacecraft Center, first as a student trainee, then as an aerospace engineer. In 1973, Glantz carried out postdoctoral research on the mathematical modeling of heart tissue at Stanford, and then at the UCSF, where he has worked since 1977.

He served for 10 years as an associate editor of the Journal of the American College of Cardiology and is a member of the California State Scientific Review Panel on Toxic Air Contaminants of the California Air Resources Board. He is married to Marsha, a home-care nurse; and is the father of journalist Aaron Glantz and daughter Frieda Glantz. In 2005, he was elected to the prestigious Institute of Medicine. Known for being blunt and abrasive, Glantz embraces his public image and controversial positions on smoking, on occasion wearing a "Here Comes Trouble" T-shirt.

== Research ==
Glantz conducts research on a wide range of issues including the effects of secondhand smoke on the heart by studying reductions in heart attacks observed when smoke-free policies are enacted, and how the tobacco industry fights tobacco control programs. His research on the effects of secondhand smoke on blood and blood vessels concludes that, in terms of heart disease, the effects of secondhand smoke are nearly as large as those of smoking. One such study demonstrated a large and rapid reduction in the number of people admitted to the hospital with heart attacks in Helena, Montana, after that community made all workplaces and public places smokefree.

Glantz is author or coauthor of numerous publications related to secondhand smoke and tobacco control, as well as many papers on cardiovascular function and biostatistics. He published the first study linking e-cigarettes to heart attacks in people. He has written several books, including the widely used Primer of Biostatistics (which has been translated into Japanese, French, Russian, German, Italian, Japanese and Spanish), and Primer of Applied Regression and Analysis of Variance. In total, he is the author of 4 books and over 400 scientific papers, including the first major review (published in Circulation) which identified secondhand smoke as a cause of heart disease and the landmark 1995 Journal of the American Medical Association summary of the Brown & Williamson documents, which showed that the tobacco industry knew nicotine was addictive and that smoking caused cancer 30 years ago. This publication was followed up with his book, The Cigarette Papers, which has played a key role in the ongoing litigation surrounding the tobacco industry. His book Tobacco Wars: Inside the California Battles chronicles the last quarter century of activism against the tobacco industry in California.

Working with the UCSF Library, Glantz helped in making over 90 million pages of previously secret tobacco industry documents available via the internet on the UCSF Truth Tobacco Industry Documents, formerly known as the Legacy Tobacco Documents Library. In February 2013, a paper co-authored by Glantz was published in the journal Tobacco Control. Entitled "'To quarterback behind the scenes, third-party efforts': the tobacco industry and the Tea Party", the paper detailed how the Tea Party political movement was funded and organized by organizations which were created by tobacco companies.

In March 2014 Glantz released a study concluding that "e-cigarette use is aggravating rather than ameliorating the tobacco epidemic among youths." Thomas J. Glynn, a researcher at the American Cancer Society, responded that "The data in this study do not allow many of the broad conclusions that it draws" In 2018, the National Academies of Science, Engineering and Medicine reviewed all the available evidence on e-cigarettes and youth and concluded that "there is substantial evidence that e-cigarette use increases risk of ever using combustible cigarettes among youth and young adults."

In March 2024, Glantz and colleagues published "Population-Based Disease Odds for E-Cigarettes and Dual Use versus Cigarettes" in NEJM Evidence reporting the associations between e-cigarette use and disease. Based on 107 peer reviewed studies of e-cigarette use in the real world, they concluded that, "Direct epidemiological evidence based on actual use of e-cigarettes in the general population suggests that, at least for cardiovascular disease, stroke, and metabolic dysfunction, the odds of disease between current e-cigarette and cigarette use were similar. For asthma, COPD, and oral disease, although lower than with cigarettes, the odds of disease were still substantial." The paper also concluded that dual use (using e-cigarettes and cigarettes at the same time) is riskier than smoking alone for all outcomes. The paper has been criticized by an e-cigarette advocate. Glantz responded that all these potential criticisms were addressed in the paper or its technical appendix.

== Activism ==
Glantz has been a leading researcher and activist in the nonsmokers' rights movement since 1978, when he helped lead an unsuccessful state initiative campaign to enact a nonsmokers' rights law by popular vote. In 1983, he helped successfully defend the San Francisco Workplace Smoking Ordinance against a tobacco industry-supported attempt to repeal it by referendum. The San Francisco victory represented the first electoral defeat of such a tobacco industry sponsored referendum, and is now viewed as a major turning point in the battle for nonsmokers' rights. He is one of the founders of Americans for Nonsmokers' Rights.

In 1982 he was part of a group of health activists who resurrected the last remaining copy of the film Death in the West, previously suppressed by Philip Morris, and developed an accompanying mini-course for fifth to tenth graders that has been used by over one million students. He helped write and produce the films Secondhand Smoke, which concerns the health effects of involuntary smoking, and 120,000 Lives, which presents evidence that smoking in the movies recruits adolescent smokers and proposes solutions for reducing this effect. He also wrote Tobacco: Biology and Politics for high school students and The Uninvited Guest, a story about secondhand smoke, for second graders.

In May, 1994, Glantz received at his UCSF office two boxes containing 4,000 documents leaked from Brown & Williamson, the third largest US cigarette manufacturer at the time. The material provided the first definitive proof that the tobacco industry had known for 30 years that nicotine was addictive and caused cancer, and had hidden that knowledge from the public. The documents became a landmark in tobacco litigation, medical scholarship, government policy, and corporate control of information. With four co-authors, Glantz analyzed the documents and, with extensive excerpts, published the findings as The Cigarette Papers.

Glantz appears in several investigative documentaries: Cigarette Wars (2011), a CNBC examination of how the tobacco industry in America "continues to thrive"; and Merchants of Doubt (2014), based on the non-fiction book, Merchants of Doubt, in which the leaked Brown & Williamson tobacco documents play a key role in illustrating tactics created by tobacco companies and copied by others.

Glantz was also an opponent of the Tobacco Master Settlement Agreement (MSA), the "global settlement" of tobacco litigation proposed in 1996, in which the tobacco industry was to be granted de facto immunity from further litigation in exchange for payments to the states and acceptance of regulation by the U.S. Food and Drug Administration. The tobacco industry turned against and defeated this compromise, and defeated legislation introduced in Congress by Senator John McCain (R-AZ), after some public health advocates succeeded in getting the immunity provisions removed. Many of the provisions of the "global settlement"—but not the immunity or FDA provisions—were implemented by the (MSA) between the attorneys general of 46 states and the large tobacco companies. Glantz' analysis of the two agreements concluded that the MSA included most of the desirable provisions of the global settlement without the immunity provisions. In particular, the immunity provisions in the global settlement would have prevented the massive (and successful) federal Racketeer Influenced and Corrupt Organizations Act (RICO) lawsuit that the US Department of Justice won against the tobacco industry in 2007. He is now running a website, SmokeFreeMedia, which is working to end depictions of tobacco use in movies.

== Oral history published by University of California ==
In July 2023, the Oral History Center at the University of California Bancroft Library published an oral history of Glantz' career. The history follows Glantz from elementary school through college and graduate school, including work to develop the emergency protocols for the Apollo 5 mission while still an undergraduate, and research on the relationship between the Department of Defense funding and university research while at Stanford. Guided by Paul Burnett, an historian of science and director of the Oral History Center, the history discusses how Glantz moved from rocket science to cardiovascular research and public health and talks about the practicalities of working at the interface between science and public policy. Also discussed is Glantz' administrative service to UCSF and the larger University of California system, including advocating for fair and equitable treatment of graduate and post-doctoral students, adjunct and clinical faculty, and research into the feasibility of restoring free high-quality higher education in California.

== Harassment allegations ==
On December 6, 2017, Dr. Eunice Neeley, a former postdoctoral researcher working with Dr. Glantz at UCSF, filed a complaint of sexual harassment against him in San Francisco Superior Court, alleging that Glantz subjected her to misogynistic, racially and sexually insensitive behavior from 2015 to 2017. Dr. Neeley also alleged that when she complained about the harassment to the university, Dr. Glantz retaliated by removing her name from a research paper she had co-authored. The UCSF Associate Vice Chancellor and Research Integrity Officer, Chairman of the Department of Medicine, and Director of the Cardiovascular Research Institute informed the intended journal, American Association for Cancer Research, by letter that "the reason that Dr. Glantz did not include Dr. Neely as an author when he initially submitted the manuscript on May 26, 2017 was that, despite repeated requests, Dr. Neeley had refused to grant Dr. Glantz permission to include her as an author on the paper." Confidential internal UCSF investigations concluded that Glantz had "more likely than not" harassed the former researcher, and that his conduct constituted "hostile work environment sexual harassment" which violated the Faculty Code of Conduct. In September 2018, the Regents of the University of California and Dr. Glantz executed a settlement agreement resolving Dr. Neeley's lawsuit against the Regents and Dr. Glantz personally. This settlement agreement, signed by all parties, stated that the Regents and Dr. Glantz denied Dr. Neeley's allegations.

In 2018, a second former employee filed a sexual-harassment lawsuit against Glantz; the University of California and Glantz denied these allegations as well.
