= The Mountain Eagle (newspaper) =

Local weekly newspaper published in Whitesburg, Kentucky

The Mountain Eagle is a local weekly newspaper published in Whitesburg, Kentucky. It is the main newspaper of Letcher County, Kentucky and one of the primary newspapers of the Eastern Kentucky Coalfield.

It was published by Thomas E. Gish until his death in November 2008, and edited by his son, Benjamin T. Gish.

== History ==
Founded by Nehemiah Webb in 1907, The Mountain Eagle was purchased by Tom and Pat Gish in 1956 and has been owned by the Gish family of Letcher County ever since. It has won numerous awards for its coverage of strip mining and its environmental effects, education, and political corruption. After the newspaper's office was set on fire by an arsonist in 1974, Tom and Pat Gish produced a new print the next morning in which they had changed the newspaper's motto from "It Screams" to "It STILL Screams." The fire, along with damage caused by the fire hoses, destroyed irreplaceable historic photographs of Appalachia.

Tom Gish was born and raised in Letcher County while Pat Gish was from Central Kentucky. The two met at The University of Kentucky. Tom Gish would later become a bureau chief for United Press in Frankfort, and Pat would become a reporter for The Lexington Leader which is now part of The Herald-Leader. The two had planned on moving to Columbus, Ohio, for Tom Gish's work; however, on a visit at Tom Gish's home they found that The Mountain Eagle was for sale and decided to buy it and remain in Letcher County the rest of their lives. It did not take long for the newspaper to gain attention as both Tom and Pat were experienced journalists. On November 21, 2008, Tom Gish died at the age of 82, and Pat Gish died on April 13, 2013, at age 87. This left the newspaper in need of a new editor and publisher and both roles would be fulfilled by Ben Gish, the son of Tom and Pat. Pat Gish was pregnant with Ben Gish when they purchased The Mountain Eagle and thus he grew up being involved in the newspaper and began working there at 5 years old, folding newspapers.

== Awards ==
On February 28, 2005, The Gish Award was created and awarded to Tom and Pat Gish by the Institute for Rural Journalism and Community Issues. It was awarded to Tom and Pat Gish at the institute's first conference for journalists focused on covering healthcare in Central Appalachia, which was held at The University of Kentucky's Center for Rural Health in Hazard, KY. This award recognizes rural journalists that demonstrate "courage, tenacity and integrity often needed to render public service through journalism." The award was named after Tom and Pat Gish in honor of their journalistic work in Appalachia through publishing The Mountain Eagle.

== Controversy ==
The controversy surrounding The Mountain Eagle first started with the Letcher County School Board. During the 1950s the Letcher County School Board was the biggest public employer of the county. Pat Gish began to sit in on the board's meetings and report what they said and did in The Mountain Eagle. This coverage caused the board to ban press coverage of its meetings, and left the town of Whitesburg in fear of unemployment. The townspeople began to conduct boycotts, create competition, and commit arson in hopes of shutting the newspaper down. Later in 1960 the controversy would continue with The Mountain Eagle's article on Bert Combs, the Kentucky governor, in which he was criticized for not taking a stronger stand against strip mining, as well as not addressing the failing economy of the Appalachian area. This led to the presence of the National Guard in the coalfields to prevent violence.

== Influence ==
The reach of "The Mountain Eagle's" influence was not limited to Letcher County or the state of Kentucky, and would become nationally influential when an article was written about the Tennessee Valley Authority's involvement in strip mining. This gained attention from Harry Caudill who wrote a book in 1963 entitled Night Comes to the Cumberlands which focused on the issues the Appalachian area faced. This book's content was similar to that of The Mountain Eagle's, touching on the same content such as strip mining, corrupt school systems, and poverty. This book gained national attention, drawing news reporters to Whitesburg. In November 1963 Homer Bigart, a New York Times reporter, traveled to Eastern Kentucky and wrote about the hunger faced in the area during Christmas. This led to donations of food and clothes from all over the country, and became the first time the federal government considered an economic aid program for Appalachia.
