= Alumni magazine =

Magazine for alumni of an educational institution

An alumni magazine is a magazine published by a university, college, or other school or by an association of a school's alumni (and sometimes current students) in order to keep alumni abreast of fellow alumni and news of their university, often with an implicit goal of fundraising.

An emerging version of alumni magazines are unrelated to educational institutions. Instead the intended readers are former employees of a company. An example of this type of alumni magazine is MoForever magazine of the law firm of Morrison & Foerster. (Note: The emerging type of alumni magazines for former employees of a company should not be confused with any fictional alumni magazines whose intended readers are former customers of the company (for example, the Flown magazine, with former passengers of Delta Air Lines as the target readership, as reported in satirical newspaper The Onion).)

== History ==
The oldest alumni magazine in the United States is Wayland Academy's Greetings, founded in 1882. Still published today, Greetings was initially mailed to Baptist families throughout Wisconsin, but by the July 1888 issue was devoted to "give former students a picture of present Wayland life and to furnish information regarding those who have once been its students." The oldest known university alumni magazine isYale Alumni Magazine, founded in 1891. Chartered in 1636, Harvard University—the oldest university in the U.S.--established an official alumni association in 1840 but did not publish the Harvard Bulletin until 1898. Seven years earlier, Yale University began publishing a weekly alumni publication, which has been credited as the first such periodical that dealt solely with college or university alumni matters. In 1894, Princeton University started producing the Alumni Princetonian in the Saturday edition of the student newspaper. The College of Wooster, however, has been credited as the first institution to publish an alumni magazine-the Alumni Bulletin-in 1886.

=== Role of Alumni Magazines ===
"The role of college and university magazines is to inform, interpret, interest, and at times to inspire." Over the years, the role of these magazines has evolved from serving solely as house organs of college and university administrations to independent journalistic voices that report about campus life, even if the stories may negatively portray the university that sponsors the publication. Alumni magazines generally report to different university departments. "Most of the magazines receive some support from gifts, the college and alumni. Some editors report to the alumni association, while other report to the offices of alumni relations or development."
The editor of the University of Idaho alumni magazine Idaho the University explicitly stated his view of the role of these publications: "Good university magazines hold themselves a little apart from the universities they serve and even farther apart from their alumni offices. They are not disloyal, but they are honest. That touch of independence is a reality check: There is a larger world to be served than just that of the university." Almost two decades earlier, Mark Singer, the former associate editor of the Yale Alumni Magazine also had strong views about the importance of maintaining an independent campus voice: "An alumni magazine should be a vehicle for continuing education; the publication that functions as a house organ is bound to estrange its audience from the intellectual life of the institution."

In April 1998, about 175 college and university alumni editors asked the Council for the Advancement and Support of Education (CASE) to endorse a statement affirming the right of editorial freedom in their publications. Editors "should be assured the freedom to exercise their editorial judgment without censorship, within the framework of agree-upon editorial policy." The statement updated an earlier version on professional standards endorsed by the American Alumni Council, the predecessor of CASE. The proposed standards "balances good and bad news" and gives a "complete picture of the institution. The editors called on CASE to adopt the standards for all of its members and mediate disputes between editors and the university administration. This current discussion partially arose because of the controversial 1995 retirement of Anthony Lyle, the editor of the University of Pennsylvania alumni magazine, Pennsylvania Gazette who published some articles that upset the Penn university administration.

CASE refused the request and in October 1998 its commission on communications "concluded that it is not within CASE's mission to sponsor, endorse, or mediate the job conditions for any group of professionals within the association."

=== Readership ===
Although there are several thousand college and university alumni magazines, no comprehensive listing of these publications has been published. In 2013, the Council for Advancement and Support of Education (CASE) published a study on some alumni magazine readers. Some of their findings from 252 participating institutions:

- "Readers of all ages prefer print magazines, and, secondly, a combination of print and online"
- 45% of respondents acquire information from their alma mater; 35% from emails from institution
- 17% spend 60 minutes or more reading the magazine; 40% spend 30–59 minutes; 31% 10–29 minutes
- 86% strongly agree or just agree that the magazine strengthens their personal connection to the institution
- 39% saved magazine article; 34% recommended school to students; 16% submitted "Class Notes"
- Magazine credibility as a source of information about the institution: 28% "consistently portrays the institution accurately and objectively; 39% "contains some 'spin' but is generally accurate and objective; 18% usually portrays the institution only in a positive light; 3% is "not a good source of objective information."

Ivy League Magazine Network (Brown, Cornell, Dartmouth, Harvard, Princeton, Stanford, University of Chicago, University of Pennsylvania, Yale) conducts surveys of its member institutions. The 2019 Media Kit published the following findings about the alumni readers of these magazines:

- 76% said it is the "primary way I stay connected to my school".
- 89% "took action as a result of seeing an article or ad."
- 73% "read it as soon as it arrives in my mailbox."
- The total circulation of the nine alumni magazines is 1,300,908

=== Controversies ===
- In September 2015, the editors of the Cornell Alumni magazine apologized for a cover photograph which featured a split-page photograph of four white students and on the other side a color photograph of four Asian students. The cover caption: "Collegetown is changing fast. Is that a good thing?" Sophie Sidhu, associate dean and director of the Asian and Asian American Center was disturbed by the cover. "While I believe that this was a poor editorial choice and not intentionally racist or malicious, it inadvertently sends a hurtful message that is neither accepted nor supported by Cornell."
- In November 2011, the national media reported that Jerry Sandusky the assistant football coach at Pennsylvania State University perpetrated multiple child molestation incidents, the Penn Stater alumni magazine was in a quandary about how to report on this notorious crime which so adversely affected the entire university community
- In 1991, when the editor of the University of Idaho alumni magazine wrote an article for that publication on Philadelphia's homeless population, his piece unleashed a controversy about the mission of alumni magazines. In response, the Assistant Director of the University of Idaho Foundation, wrote that the "purpose of the magazine, as made explicit by its title, Idaho the University is to report the research, scholarship, teaching and contributions by the faculty, staff, and students of the University of Idaho to the State of Idaho and alumni and friends of this institution . . . We have no ambition to be a national magazine or to discuss current literary, historical, sociological, economic or scientific matters not pertinent to what is going on at the University of Idaho or in the State of Idaho."
- In 1982, Dartmouth President David T. McLaughlin placed Dennis A. Dinan, editor of the Dartmouth Alumni Magazine, on probation if he didn't publish more positive stories about the College. Dinan, who formerly worked at American Heritage, recalled that the president told him that the magazine had "gone out of its way" to portray the school in a negative light. The editor decided that the prospect of probation was 'intolerable' and resigned his position on December 31, 1982.

== Awards for Excellence ==
The Robert Sibley Magazine of the Year award, which bears the name of a former editor of the University of California at Berkeley's alumni monthly, helped initiate the award in 1943 which is the highest award given to alumni magazine editors. The first awards focusing on editorial excellence and achievement by alumni magazines were awarded by the American Alumni Council in 1929. More than 100 magazines competed for awards recognizing best editorial and best story on the achievement of an alumnus, among other topics. California Monthly—the predecessor publication to California, the alumni publication of the University of California, Berkeley—took home top honors for articles about alumni. Robert Sibley was the editor of the winning publication.

=== Recent Award Recipients ===
- 2020 LMU Magazine, Joseph Wakelee-Lynch, editor
- 2019 Wake Forest Magazine, Maria Henson, editor
- 2018 HBS Alumni Bulletin, Tom Witkowski, editor
- 2017 TCNJ Magazine, Renee Olson, editor
- 2016 UofTMed, Heidi Singer, editor
- 2015 Johns Hopkins Magazine, Dale Keiger, editor
- 2014 Kenyon College Alumni Bulletin, Shawn Presley, editor
- 2013 Harvard Medicine, Harvard University, Ann Marie Menting, editor
- 2012 University of Chicago Magazine, Amy Puma, editor
- 2011 Kenyon College Alumni Bulletin, Shawn Presley, editor
- 2010 CAM, University of Cambridge, Mira Katbamna, editor

== List of alumni magazines ==
=== 0-9 ===
| Magazine name | Educational institution | Ref. |
|---|---|---|
| 116th and Broadway | Columbia Journalism School | |

=== A ===
| Magazine name | Educational institution | Ref. |
|---|---|---|
| ACU Today | Abilene Christian University | |
| AIU ink | American InterContinental University | |
| Alabama Alumni Magazine | University of Alabama | |
| AlbanyLaw Magazine | Albany Law School | |
| The Alcalde | The University of Texas at Austin | |
| Alumni & Friends | University of Jamestown | |
| Alumni Magazine | Black Hills State University | |
| Alumnus | University of Michigan | |
| ALUMNUS | Mississippi State University | |
| American University Magazine | American University | |
| Amherst | Amherst College | |
| Andover Magazine | Phillips Academy (Massachusetts) | |
| Arches | University of Puget Sound | |
| Arizona Alumni Magazine | University of Arizona | |
| Aspire: The Lehigh Carbon Community College Magazine | Lehigh Carbon Community College | |
| ASU Magazine | Arizona State University | |
| AtBuffalo | State University of New York at Buffalo | |
| Auburn Magazine | Auburn University | |

=== B ===
| Magazine name | Educational institution | Ref. |
|---|---|---|
| Baruch College Alumni Magazine | Baruch College | |
| Bates Magazine | Bates College | |
| Baylor Magazine | Baylor University | |
| The Bell | Thiel College | |
| Bellarmine Magazine | Bellarmine University | |
| Bentley Magazine | Bentley University | |
| Berkeley Carroll School Magazine | Berkeley Carroll School | |
| Berry | Berry College | |
| Binghamton University Magazine | Binghamton University | |
| Biola Magazine | Biola University | |
| Bluffton | Bluffton University | |
| Boston College Magazine | Boston College | |
| Bostonia | Boston University | |
| Brandeis Magazine | Brandeis University | |
| BROOME Magazine | SUNY Broome Community College | |
| Brown Alumni Magazine | Brown University | |
| Brown Medicine | Brown University's Alpert Medical School | |
| Bucknell Magazine | Bucknell University | |

=== C ===
| Magazine name | Educational institution | Ref. |
|---|---|---|
| Cal State East Bay | California State University, East Bay | |
| California Magazine | University of California, Berkeley | |
| Caltech Magazine (formerly Engineering & Science) | California Institute of Technology | |
| CAM | University of Cambridge | |
| Campbell Magazine | Campbell University | |
| Carlson School | University of Minnesota's Carlson School of Management | |
| The Carthaginian | Carthage College | |
| Case Alumnus | Case Western Reserve University's Case School of Engineering | |
| Castleton Magazine | Castleton University | |
| Cedarville Magazine | Cedarville University | |
| Clark Magazine | Clark University | |
| CMC Magazine | Claremont McKenna College | |
| Colby Magazine | Colby College | |
| Colby-Sawyer College Magazine | Colby-Sawyer College | |
| Coloradan | University of Colorado Boulder | |
| Columbia Business | Columbia Business School | |
| Columbia College Today | Columbia University's Columbia College | |
| Columbia Engineering | Columbia University's Fu Foundation School of Engineering and Applied Science | |
| Columbia Law School Magazine | Columbia Law School | |
| Columbia Magazine | Columbia University | |
| Columbia Medicine | Columbia University's College of Physicians and Surgeons | |
| Columbia Nursing | Columbia University School of Nursing | |
| Columns | University of Washington | |
| Connections | Minot State University | |
| Contact | Fitchburg State University | |
| Cornell Alumni Magazine | Cornell University | |
| Crossroads Magazine | Missouri Southern State University | |
| Cumberland Lawyer | Stamford University's Stanford Law School | |
| Cumberlands Alumni Magazine | University of the Cumberlands | |
| Cupola | Moses Brown School | |

=== D ===
| Magazine name | Educational institution | Ref. |
|---|---|---|
| Dakota State Magazine | Dakota State University | |
| Dartmouth Alumni Magazine | Dartmouth College | |
| Denver Law | University of Denver's Sturm College of Law | |
| DePaul Magazine | DePaul University | |
| DePauw Magazine | DePauw University | |
| DEMO | Columbia College Chicago | |
| Dialogues | Fashion Institute of Design & Merchandising | |
| Dickinson Magazine | Dickinson College | |
| Drexel Magazine | Drexel University | |
| Drexel University College of Medicine Alumni Magazine | Drexel University's College of Medicine | |
| Duke Magazine | Duke University | |

=== E ===
| Magazine name | Educational institution | Ref. |
|---|---|---|
| Eastern Magazine | Eastern Washington University | |
| EKU Magazine | Eastern Kentucky University | |
| Elizabethtown | Elizabethtown College | |
| Emory & Henry | Emory & Henry College | |
| The Evergreen Magazine | The Evergreen State College | |
| Exchange | Institute for the International Education of Students | |
| The Exeter Bulletin | Phillips Exeter Academy | |

=== F ===
| Magazine name | Educational institution | Ref. |
|---|---|---|
| Farmington First | University of Maine at Farmington | |
| Flagler College Magazine | Flagler College | |
| Florida Gator Magazine | University of Florida | |
| Florida State Law | Florida State University College of Law | |
| Fordham News | Fordham University | |
| Forward | Seton Hall University | |
| Fox Focus | Temple University's Fox School of Business | |
| Foxcraft | Foxcroft Academy | |
| Framingham State | Framingham State University | |
| Franklin College Magazine | Franklin College (Indiana) | |
| Furman Magazine (South Carolina) | Furman University | |

=== G ===
| Magazine name | Educational institution | Ref. |
|---|---|---|
| GēDUNK | Grove City College | |
| Georgetown Law | Georgetown University Law Center | |
| Georgetown Magazine | Georgetown University | |
| Georgia Magazine | University of Georgia | |
| Georgia State University Magazine | Georgia State University | |
| Georgia Tech Alumni Magazine | Georgia Institute of Technology | |
| Gold Coaster | Adams House, Harvard College | |
| Gonzaga Magazine | Gonzaga University | |
| The Graduate | University of Arkansas's Dale Bumpers College of Agricultural, Food and Life Sciences | |
| Greetings | Wayland Academy | |
| gssmNOW | South Carolina Governor's School for Science and Mathematics | |
| GW Magazine | George Washington University | |

=== H ===
| Magazine name | Educational institution | Ref. |
|---|---|---|
| Hamline Magazine | Hamline University | |
| Harvard Magazine | Harvard University | |
| Harvard Business School Alumni Bulletin | Harvard Business School | |
| Haverford | Haverford College | |
| Here We Have Idaho Magazine | University of Idaho | |
| Howard Magazine | Howard University | |
| Hue | Fashion Institute of Technology | |
| Huntsman Alumni Magazine | Utah State University's Jon M. Huntsman School of Business | |

=== I ===
| Magazine name | Educational institution | Ref. |
|---|---|---|
| Illinois State | Illinois State University | |
| Illuster | Utrecht University | |
| Indiana University Alumni Magazine | Indiana University | |
| Industrial & Systems Engineering | Georgia Institute of Technology's H. Milton Stewart School of Industrial and Systems Engineering | |
| inPractice | Pennsylvania College of Health Sciences | |
| Iowa Alumni Magazine | University of Iowa | |
| ISU Magazine | Idaho State University | |
| IUP Magazine | Indiana University of Pennsylvania | |

=== J ===
| Magazine name | Educational institution | Ref. |
|---|---|---|
| John Carroll University | John Carroll University | |

=== K ===
| Magazine name | Educational institution | Ref. |
|---|---|---|
| K-Stater | Kansas State University | |
| Kansas Alumni | University of Kansas | |
| Kentucky Alumni | University of Kentucky | |
| The Kenyon College Alumni Bulletin | Kenyon College | |
| Knightlines | University of Bridgeport | |
| Knox Magazine | Knox College (Illinois) | |

=== L ===
| Magazine name | Educational institution | Ref. |
|---|---|---|
| Lift | Embry–Riddle Aeronautical University | |
| Link | Kansas State University's Global Campus | |
| LMU | Loyola Marymount University | |
| Loquitur | Vermont Law School | |
| LSU Alumni Magazine | Louisiana State University | |
| LSU Geology & Geophysics Alumni Magazine | Louisiana State University's Department of Geology & Geophysics | |
| Luther Alumni Magazine | Luther College (Iowa) | |
| Lynchburg College Magazine | Lynchburg College | |

=== M ===
| Magazine name | Educational institution | Ref. |
|---|---|---|
| Maine Alumni Magazine | University of Maine | |
| Marian University Magazine | Marian University (Indiana) | |
| Marriott Alumni Magazine | Brigham Young University's Marriott School of Business | |
| Mars Hill: The Magazine of Mars Hill University | Mars Hill University | |
| Maryland Carey Law | University of Maryland's Francis King Carey School of Law | |
| Mayo Clinic Alumni | Mayo Clinic | |
| Medical Alumni Magazine | Joint Medical Program of the University of Newcastle and the University of New England (both in Australia) | |
| Metropolitan Denver Magazine | Metropolitan State University of Denver | |
| McCombs | University of Texas at Austin's McCombs School of Business | |
| MCLA Alumni Magazine | Massachusetts College of Liberal Arts | |
| Miamiam | Miami University | |
| Middlebury Magazine | Middlebury College | |
| Middlesex | Middlesex School | |
| Mines Magazine | Colorado School of Mines | |
| Minnesota Alumni | University of Minnesota | |
| Mirage Magazine | University of New Mexico | |
| Missouri S&T Magazine | Missouri University of Science and Technology | |
| MIT Technology Review (formerly The Technology Review, Technology Review) | Massachusetts Institute of Technology | |
| MIT Sloan | MIT Sloan School of Management | |
| MIZZOU | University of Missouri | |
| Monmouth University Magazine | Monmouth University | |
| Montanan | University of Montana | |
| Montclair State University Magazine | Montclair State University | |
| Moody Alumni News | Moody Bible Institute | |
| MSU Alumni Magazine | Michigan State University | |
| Muhlenberg | Muhlenberg College | |

=== N ===
| Magazine name | Educational institution | Ref. |
|---|---|---|
| Nebraska Magazine | University of Nebraska–Lincoln | |
| New Paltz | State University of New York at New Paltz | |
| New York Law School Magazine | New York Law School | |
| Newhouse Network | Syracuse University's S. I. Newhouse School of Public Communications | |
| NMH Magazine | Northfield Mount Hermon School | |
| Northeastern | Northeastern University | |
| Northeastern College of Professional Studies Alumni Magazine | Northeastern University's Northeastern College of Professional Studies | |
| Northern Magazine | Northern Michigan University | |
| Northwest Alumni Magazine | Northwest Missouri State University | |
| Northwestern | Northwestern University | |

=== O ===
| Magazine name | Educational institution | Ref. |
|---|---|---|
| Oberlin Alumni Magazine | Oberlin College | |
| Ohio State Alumni | Ohio State University | |
| Ohio TodayF | Ohio University | |
| Old Dominion University | Old Dominion University | |
| On Wisconsin | University of Wisconsin–Madison | |
| Oregon Stater | Oregon State University | |
| OSWEGO | State University of New York at Oswego | |
| The Owl | Columbia University School of General Studies | |
| Oxford Today: The University Magazine | Oxford University | |

=== P ===
| Magazine name | Educational institution | Ref. |
|---|---|---|
| Pacific Review | University of the Pacific (California) | |
| Penn GSE Magazine | University of Pennsylvania Graduate School of Education | |
| The Penn Stater | Pennsylvania State University | |
| Pennsylvania Gazette | University of Pennsylvania | |
| Phoenix Focus | University of Phoenix | |
| Pierce Alumni Magazine | Franklin Pierce University | |
| Portland State Magazine | Portland State University | |
| Pomona College Magazine | Pomona College | |
| Prairie | The Prairie School (Racine, Wisconsin) | |
| Presbyterian College Magazine | Presbyterian College | |
| The Pride | St. Mark's School of Texas | |
| Primus | Columbia University College of Dental Medicine | |
| Princeton Alumni Weekly | Princeton University | |
| Principia Purpose | Principia College | |
| Providence College Magazine | Providence College | |
| Purchase | Purchase College, State University of New York | |

=== Q ===
| Magazine name | Educational institution | Ref. |
|---|---|---|
| QuadAngles | University of Rhode Island | |

=== R ===
| Magazine name | Educational institution | Ref. |
|---|---|---|
| Reed Magazine | Reed College | |
| Regis | Regis High School (New York City) | |
| Regis University Magazine | Regis University | |
| Rensselaer | Rensselaer Polytechnic Institute | |
| Rhode Island College Magazine | Rhode Island College | |
| Rider | Rider University | |
| Ripon Magazine | Ripon College (Wisconsin) | |
| RISD XYZ | Rhode Island School of Design | |
| Rowan Magazine | Rowan University | |
| Rutgers Magazine | Rutgers, The State University of New Jersey | |

=== S ===
| Magazine name | Educational institution | Ref. |
|---|---|---|
| Sac State Magazine | California State University, Sacramento | |
| Saint Francis | University of Saint Francis (Indiana) | |
| St. John's University Alumni Magazine | St. John's University (New York City) | |
| St. Lawrence | St. Lawrence University | |
| Saint Mary's Magazine | Saint Mary's University of Minnesota | |
| Saint Michael's College Magazine | Saint Michael's College | |
| St. Norbert College Magazine | St. Norbert College | |
| St. Olaf Magazine | St. Olaf College | |
| St. Thomas Magazine | University of St. Thomas (Minnesota) | |
| The Scarab | Medical College of Virginia | |
| Scripps Magazine | Scripps College | |
| Sesame | Open University | |
| Shafer Court Connections | Virginia Commonwealth University | |
| Shareholder | Saint Louis University's John Cook School of Business | |
| Shipmate | United States Naval Academy | |
| Siena News Magazine | Siena College | |
| SIPA | Columbia University's School of International and Public Affairs | |
| Southern Alumni Magazine | Southern Connecticut State University | |
| Southern News | Florida Southern College | |
| Spark Magazine | Calvin College | |
| Stanford Magazine | Stanford University | |
| STATE | South Dakota State University | |
| State | Oklahoma State University | |
| STERN business | New York University Stern School of Business | |
| The Stevens Indicator | Stevens Institute of Technology | |
| Stevenson Alumni Magazine | Stevenson School | |
| Stonehill Alumni Magazine | Stonehill College | |
| Suffolk Law Alumni Magazine | Suffolk University Law School | |
| Superscript | Columbia Graduate School of Arts and Sciences | |
| SUU in View | Southern Utah University | |

=== T ===
| Magazine name | Educational institution | Ref. |
|---|---|---|
| TCNJ Magazine | The College of New Jersey | |
| TCU Magazine | Texas Christian University | |
| The Tennessee Alumnus | University of Tennessee (all campuses) | |
| Tepper Magazine | Tepper School of Business | |
| Texas Aggie | Texas A&M University | |
| The Tower | Kutztown University of Pennsylvania | |
| Tradition | Cranbrook Schools | |
| Triton | University of California, San Diego | |
| Troy University Magazine | Troy University | |
| Tufts Magazine | Tufts University | |

=== U ===
| Magazine name | Educational institution | Ref. |
|---|---|---|
| UC Hastings | University of California, Hastings College of the Law | |
| UC Santa Cruz Review | University of California, Santa Cruz | |
| UCLA Magazine | University of California, Los Angeles | |
| UConn Magazine | University of Connecticut | |
| UH Alumni Quarterly | University of Houston | |
| UMASS Amherst | University of Massachusetts Amherst | |
| UMASS Lowell Magazine for Alumni and Friends | University of Massachusetts Lowell | |
| UMASSD Magazine | University of Massachusetts Dartmouth | |
| UMBC Magazine | University of Maryland, Baltimore County | |
| UMKC School of Law | University of Missouri–Kansas City School of Law | |
| UNCP Magazine | University of North Carolina at Greensboro | |
| UNCP Today | University of North Carolina at Pembroke | |
| UNH Magazine | University of New Hampshire | |
| Union College: A Magazine for Alumni and Friends | Union College | |
| The University Magazine | Rochester Institute of Technology | |
| The University of Chicago Magazine | University of Chicago | |
| University of Dayton Magazine | University of Dayton | |
| University of New Haven Alumni Magazine | University of New Haven | |
| The University of Virginia Magazine | University of Virginia | |
| UNO Magazine | University of Nebraska Omaha | |
| Ursinus College Magazine | Ursinus College | |
| USC Trojan Family Magazine | University of Southern California | |
| Utah Tech University Magazine (alternatively UT Magazine, formerly DSU Magazine) | Utah Tech University (formerly Dixie State University) | |
| UVU Magazine | Utah Valley University | |
| UWYO Magazine | University of Wyoming | |

=== V ===
| Magazine name | Educational institution | Ref. |
|---|---|---|
| Vanderbilt Magazine | Vanderbilt University | |
| Vermont Quarterly | University of Vermont | |
| VISIONS | Iowa State University | |

=== W ===
| Magazine name | Educational institution | Ref. |
|---|---|---|
| W&J Magazine | Washington & Jefferson College | |
| W&M | College of William & Mary | |
| Wake Forest Magazine | Wake Forest University | |
| Walden Alumni Magazine | Walden University | |
| Washington and Lee Law Alumni Magazine | Washington and Lee University School of Law | |
| Washington College Magazine | Washington College | |
| Washington Magazine | Washington University in St. Louis | |
| Washington Square: The Stories of San Jose State University | San Jose State University | |
| Washington State Magazine | Washington State University | |
| Wayne State Magazine | Wayne State University | |
| Wesleyan Today | Wesleyan University | |
| Western Magazine | Western Illinois University | |
| Wharton Magazine | Wharton School of the University of Pennsylvania | |
| Wheaton | Wheaten College (Illinois) | |
| Whitman Magazine | Whitman College | |
| Williams Magazine | Williams College | |
| WKU Spirit | Western Kentucky University | |
| WKWSCI Alumni Magazine | Nanyang Technological University's Wee Kim Wee School of Communication and Information | |
| WVU Magazine | West Virginia University | |

=== Y ===
| Magazine name | Educational institution | Ref. |
|---|---|---|
| Y Magazine | Brigham Young University | |
| Yale Alumni Magazine | Yale University | |
| Yale Law Report | Yale Law School | |
| Youngstown State University: A Magazine for Alumni and Friends | Youngstown State University | |
