= Gordon Kaufman =

Gordon Kaufman may refer to:

- Gordon D. Kaufman (1925–2011), theologian
- Gordon M. Kaufman, professor of statistics

== See also ==
- Gordon Kaufmann, American architect
