= Ryan Craig (education investor) =

Canadian investor and author

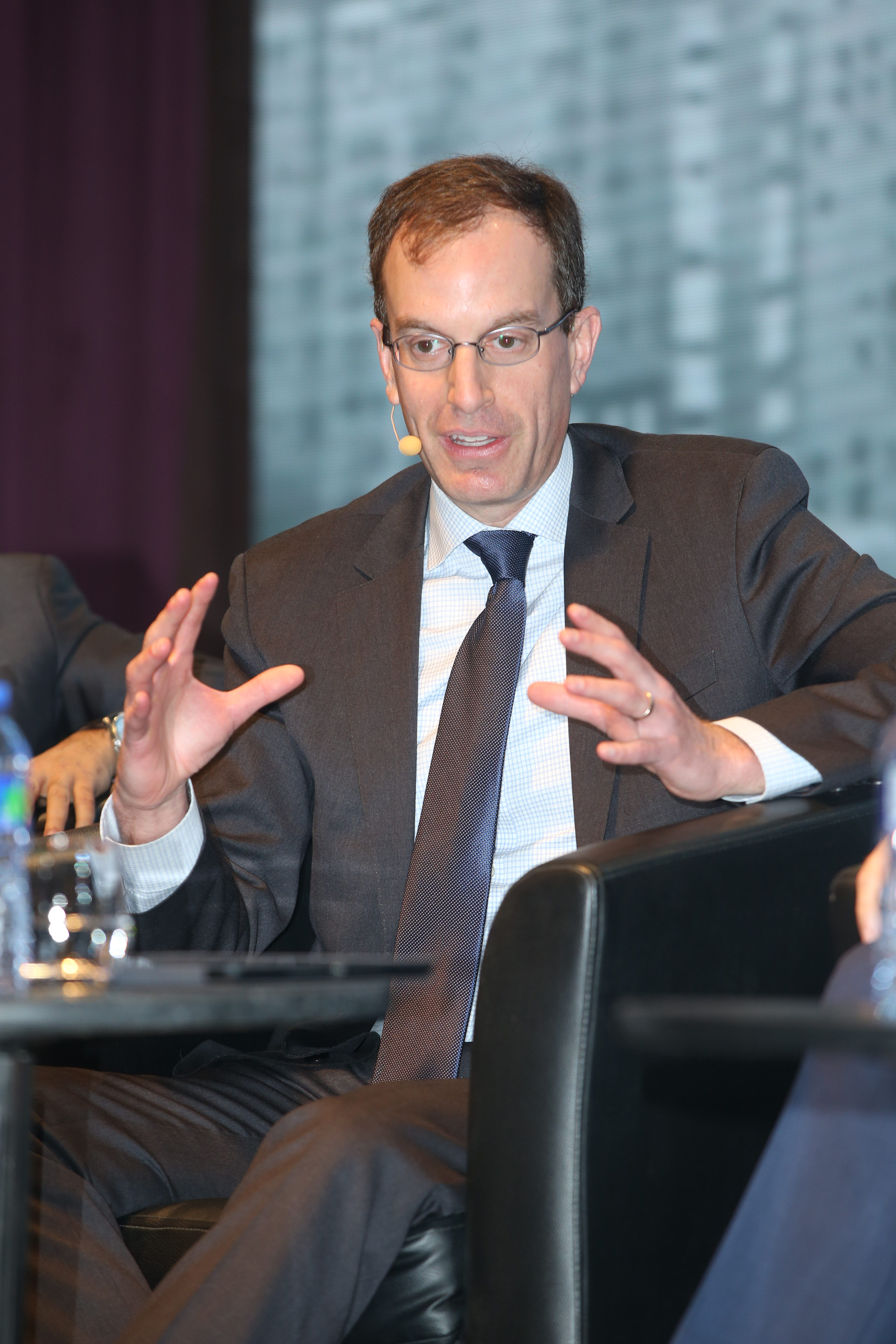
Ryan Craig speaking at the inaugural 2017 Yidan Pize Summit

Ryan Craig (born February 12, 1972) is a Canadian-born investor, author, and commentator on issues of higher education and workforce development. He advocates for apprenticeships as a faster, less expensive, and less risky pathway to career launch and economic mobility than four-year college degrees. Craig co-founded and serves as Managing Director of Achieve Partners, which acquires technology and healthcare services companies in sectors facing talent shortages, as well as educational technology companies.

== Early life and education ==
Craig was born in Toronto, Canada on February 12, 1972. He cites his mother, who taught sociology at a community college for 30 years, for sparking his interest in academia and student outcomes from a young age. He attended Yale University, earning bachelor’s degrees in literature and economics, before proceeding to obtain a Juris Doctor from Yale Law School. While at Yale, Craig co-founded Rumpus Magazine, a student-run tabloid newspaper, alongside his fellow classmates, including journalist and author Euny Hong.

== Career ==
Ryan Craig's professional career began as a consultant for McKinsey & Company. From 1999 to 2001, Ryan Craig was Vice President of Strategic Development at Fathom, an online learning portal project led by Columbia University.

From 2001, Ryan headed the Education & Training sector at private equity firm Warburg Pincus.

In March 2004, Ryan Craig began serving as President of Wellspring Academies, a division of therapeutic intervention company Aspen Education Group.

In 2011, Craig co-founded University Ventures, an investment firm focused on the education sector.

In 2019 he became Managing Director at Achieve Partners, a private equity firm acquiring tech and healthcare service companies in sectors with severe talent shortages, building apprenticeship programs within them. That same year, the American Association of University Administrators granted him the Stephen J. Trachtenberg award for thought leadership in higher education.

In 2022, in partnership with the Urban Institute and Maryland State Senator Jim Rosapepe, Craig co-founded Apprenticeships for America, the first industry association for apprenticeship sponsors and intermediaries.

Craig is also a Senior Fellow at the Progressive Policy Institute. He spoke at the institute's panel "New Career Pathways for Young Americans" at the 2024 Democratic National Convention, advocating for apprenticeship and “earn-and-learn” pathways for youth economic mobility.

== Commentary and publications ==
Ryan Craig is a regular contributor to publications on matters related to higher education, startups, workforce-related issues, and education technology. He also publishes a biweekly newsletter for Achieve Partners, The Gap Letter.

In 2015, Craig authored College Disrupted: The Great Unbundling of Higher Education, published by Palgrave Macmillan. The book discusses and speculates on changes in American higher education brought about by the advent of massive online open courses (MOOCs).

In 2018, Craig released A New U: Faster + Cheaper Alternatives to College. A New U was named a favorite book of 2018 by The Wall Street Journal.

Craig’s most recent book, Apprentice Nation: How the "Earn and Learn" Alternative to Higher Education Will Create a Stronger and Fairer America, was released in 2023. According to Bloomberg, the book “makes the case that the US isn’t doing nearly enough to develop the ‘earn and learn’ educational system” needed to address persistent talent shortages.

== See also ==
- Apprenticeship in the United States
- Educational Technology
- Massive open online course
