= Mitchell James Kaplan =

American writer

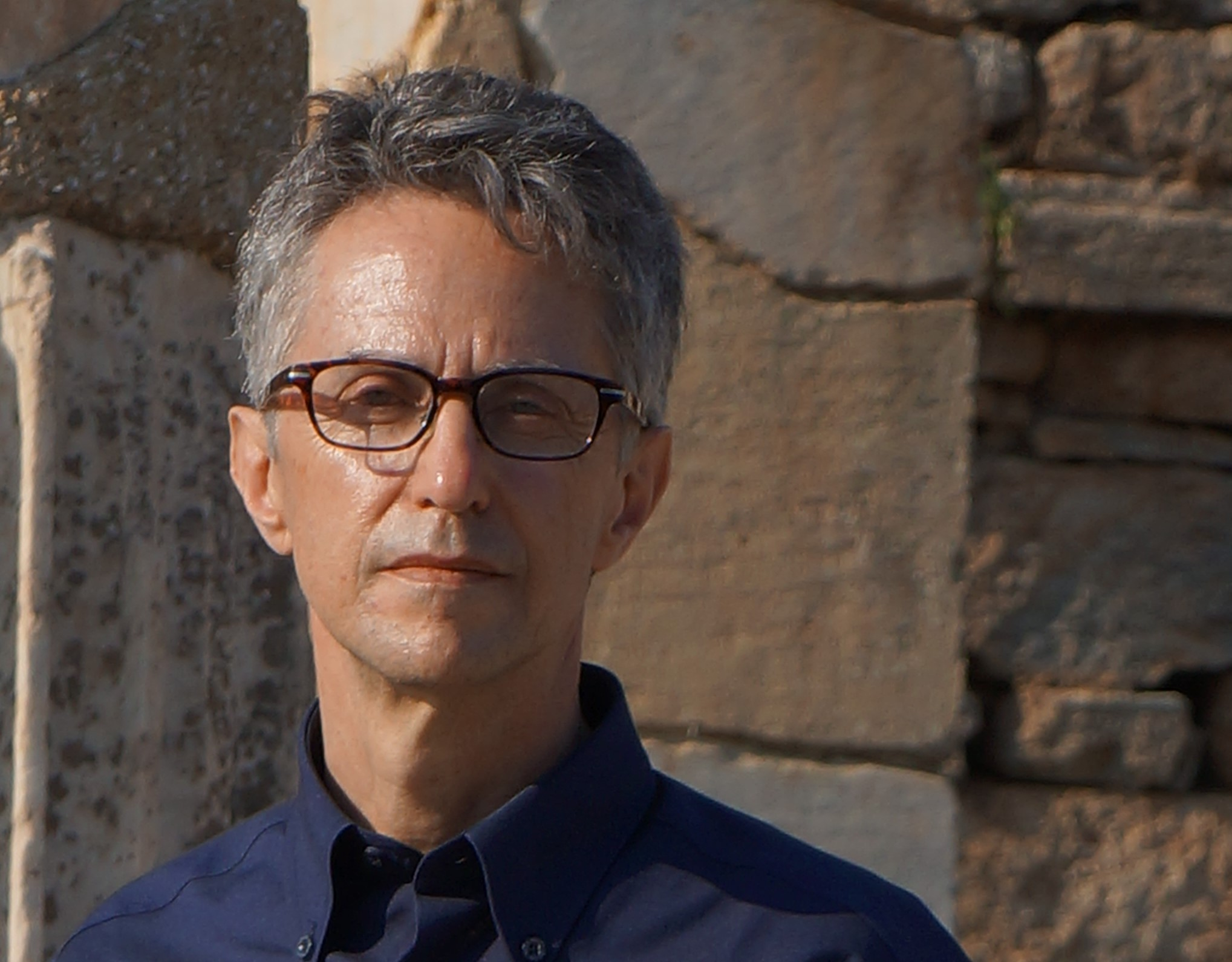
- Born: Mitchell James Kaplan; Los Angeles, California, U.S.
- Education: Yale University
- Occupations: Writer; Musician
- Spouse: Annie Kaplan
- Children: 2
- Awards: 2011 Independent Publishers Award); 2011 ForeWord Magazine Book of the Year Award (BOTYA) Bronze Medal
- Website: mitchelljameskaplan.com/

Mitchell James Kaplan is an American author. He has published three fiction novels: By Fire, By Water, Into the Unbounded Night, and Rhapsody. By Fire, By Water won the 2011 Independent Publishers Award Gold Medal for Historical Fiction. He has also written book reviews and literary commentaries for Pittsburgh Post-Gazette.

== Early life ==
Mitchell James Kaplan attended The Cate School, a boarding preparatory high school near Santa Barbara, California.

Following time at Yale University, Kaplan spent four years in France, where he worked as a translator. He returned to California in 1986, where he and his wife worked in the film industry as script doctors and wrote several screenplays of their own.

== Career ==
=== Author ===
==== By Fire, By Water ====
Kaplan spent six years writing his first novel, By Fire, By Water, which was published by Other Press in 2010. By Fire, By Water was a Book Club selection of the Jewish Book Council and Kaplan was invited to speak in venues throughout the United States, Mexico, and Italy. He was honored as one of the six up-and-coming authors in the “First Author, First Book” program at the 2010 American Library Association conference in Washington, DC. By Fire, By Water received numerous awards and accolades including the 2011 Independent Publisher Book Awards Gold Medal for Historical Fiction, the ForeWord Magazine Book of the Year Award Bronze Medal for Historical Fiction, an Eric Hoffer Award Honorable Mention in the General Fiction category, and the Adelina Della Pergola Students' Choice Prize for the Italian edition. It was one of fifteen novels nominated for the Goodreads Choice Award in Historical Fiction< and was selected as Book of the Year by "One Book, One Community" organizations in Philadelphia and other cities. In the Minneapolis Star-Tribune, Pamela Miller called By Fire, By Water "[a] remarkably learned and heartbreaking romantic novel." In “Haaretz”, Matt Beynon Rees wrote that it "must take its place as one of the most important contemporary historical novels with a Jewish theme." Tirdad Derakshani, in The Philadelphia Inquirer, called By Fire, By Water "a beautiful tapestry... Despite its epic sweep, [it] is also an intimate portrait of a remarkable individual." Rege Behe, in the Pittsburgh Tribune-Review, called it "a grand novel."

==== Into the Unbounded Night ====
Kaplan's second novel, Into the Unbounded Night, was published in September 2020 by Regal House. In The Millions, Martha Anne Toll called the novel "sweeping and absorbing". Pamela Miller, in the Minneapolis StarTribune, said: "Kaplan is a gifted storyteller and approaches his story with reverence and nuance. The pursuit of meaning and hope in a dark time is an age-old theme, and yet ever fresh. Into the Unbounded Night is a perfect book to top our reading piles in the coming COVID winter."

==== Rhapsody ====
Kaplan's third novel, Rhapsody, was published on March 2, 2021, by Gallery Books / Simon & Schuster. It has been prominently reviewed and appeared on several “Most Exciting Upcoming Reads” lists. Rhapsody appeared on many “Best of 2021” lists; critics and readers were again enthusiastic: "Kaplan (By Fire, by Water) builds an enchanting world featuring musical giants George Gershwin and Kay Swift... This spellbinding and luminous tale will linger in readers’ minds long after the final page is turned." (Publishers Weekly, Starred Review); “A complex and involving story… It is difficult to imagine living a more incredible first half of a life than Swift’s, and Mitchell James Kaplan’s prose luxuriates in depicting her surprising and wildly artistic world.” (Pittsburgh Post-Gazette); "Kaplan’s well-researched and well-crafted historical novel recreates the 1920s and ’30s, telling a mesmerizing story that examines their individual and intersecting lives. He explores why, for Gershwin and Swift, 'ordinary results' were not enough." (Yale Alumni Magazine) In July, 2022, the Library of Virginia announced that "Rhapsody" was a Finalist in their People's Choice Award.

=== Other professional activities ===
Kaplan has written book reviews and literary commentaries for the Pittsburgh Post-Gazette.

== Personal life ==
Mitchell completed the first draft of his first novel, By Fire, By Water, in his country house in Big Bear, California.

== Awards and highlights ==
- 2010: Book Club selection of the Jewish Book Council for By Fire, By Water
- 2011: Independent Publisher Book Awards (IPPY) Gold Medal for Historical Fiction

== Bibliography ==
=== Fiction ===
- By Fire, By Water. Other Press, 2010. ISBN 9781590513521 By Fire, By Water
- Into the Unbounded Night. Regal House Publishing, 2020. ISBN 9781646030026 Into the Unbounded Night
- Rhapsody. Gallery Books, 2021. ISBN 9781982104009 Rhapsody

=== Selected articles ===
- “Christopher Columbus' Patron and Financier”. The Daily Beast. October 11, 2010.
- “The Next Page: The endless discovery of Christopher Columbus”. Pittsburgh Post-Gazette. October 2, 2011.
- “'God's Jury': Why everybody has come to expect the Inquisition”. Pittsburgh Post-Gazette. January 15, 2012.
- “The Next Page: In praise of the massive, sprawling 19th-century novel (or, un-hunchbacking the mind)”. Pittsburgh Post-Gazette. December 9, 2012.
- “‘Christ Actually’ asserts that Jesus is human, Jewish and divine”. Pittsburgh Post-Gazette. December 14, 2014.
- “Review: 'Bound in the Bond of Life' offers Pittsburgh perspectives on Tree of Life tragedy”. Pittsburgh Post-Gazette. October 25, 2020.

=== Multimedia ===
- with Jaynie Royal" Truth in Historical Fiction" A Conspiracy of Lemurs. July 15, 2020.
- with Susanne Dunlap "It's Just Historical: Interview with Mitchell James Kaplan" It's Just Historical. July 15, 2020.
- "Any Saturday" A Conspiracy of Lemurs. February 2, 2021.
- "Roanoke author Mitchell James Kaplan talks newest novel" Richmond Times-Dispatch. March 18, 2021.
- with Dean Karayanis. "George Gershwin and Kay Swift, in Mitchell James Kaplan's Novel "Rhapsody"" History Author Show with Dean Karayanis. August 22, 2021.
