= John Case Nemiah =

American psychiatrist

John C. Nemiah (November 30, 1918 – May 11, 2009) was an American psychiatrist.

Nemiah was born on November 30, 1918, in Cheshire, Connecticut, and later on moved with his family to Hanover, New Hampshire, when he was young. During his childhood, while at Hotchkiss School, he decided to pursue a career in psychiatry while reading Sigmund Freud. He attended Yale University, where he served on the business staff of The Yale Record, the campus humor magazine. After Yale, he graduated from Harvard Medical School in 1943 he obtained an internship at Boston City Hospital and was a resident in at Yale General Hospital and Massachusetts General Hospital. His residencies were interrupted when he was drafted into the armed service for two years where he kept his neuropsychiatrist position.

He held the same position at Tufts University, became a member of the faculty, and served as chief of Inpatient Psychiatry Unit for 16 years. During the same years he began psychoanalytic training at the Boston Psychoanalytic Institute, where he also did psychiatry and psychosomatic researches. He held weekly lectures on psychopathology and psychodynamics at his alma mater and Massachusetts General Hospital.

From 1968 to 1973 he was a secretary to the faculty of medicine, and from 1968 to 1985 he was Psychiatrist-in-Chief at the Beth Israel Hospital. In 1978 he became the 10th editor of the American Journal of Psychiatry.

In 1985 he retired but continued lecturing at the Dartmouth Medical School and two years later was awarded the Outstanding Psychiatric Educator award from the Association for Academic Psychiatry. He died at 90 years of age on May 11, 2009 in Nashua, New Hampshire.
