= Herman Armour Webster =

American etcher water colerist

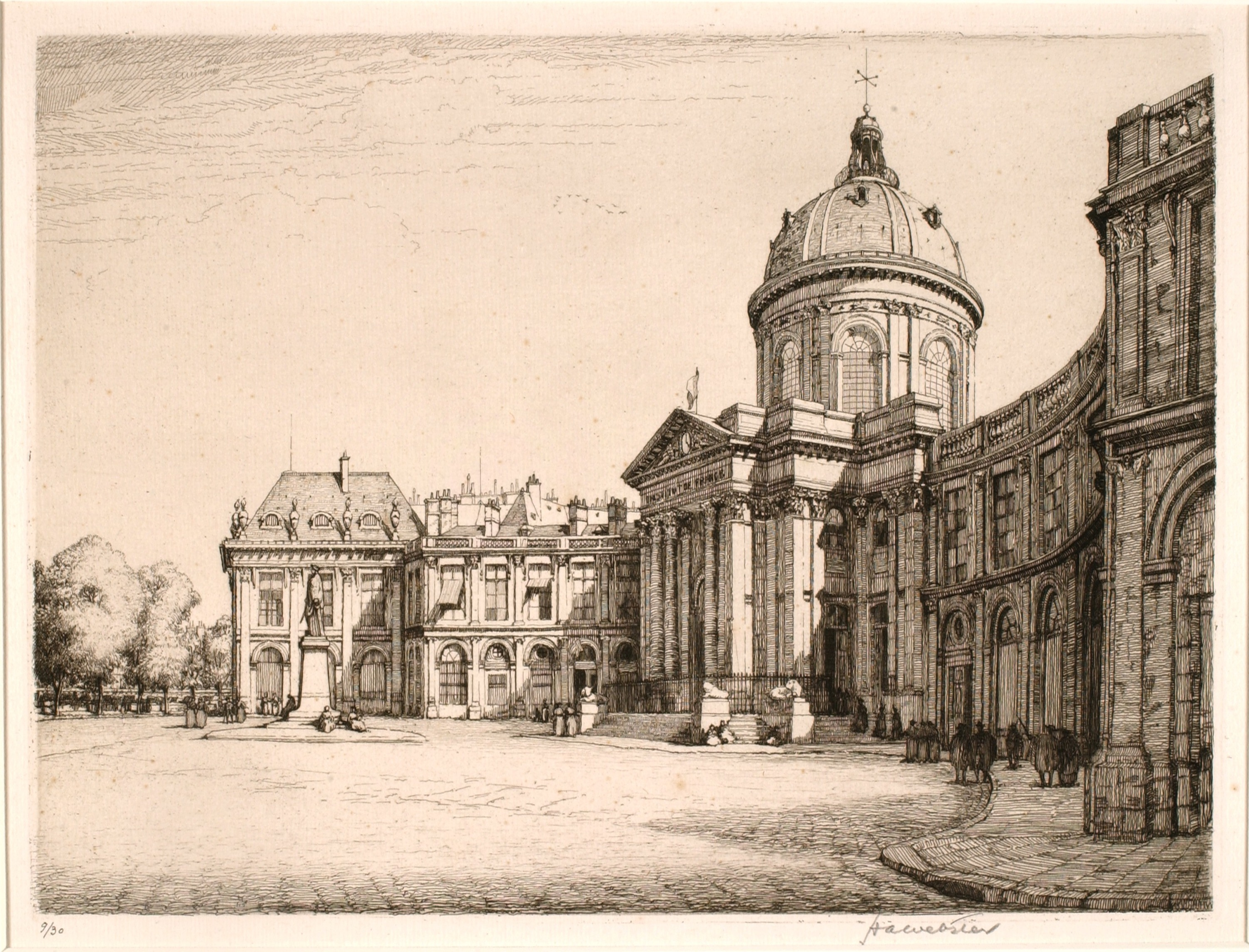
L'Institut de France, Paris (1913).

Herman Armour Webster (New York City, April 6, 1878 – Paris, March 9, 1970) was an American artist.

== Biography ==
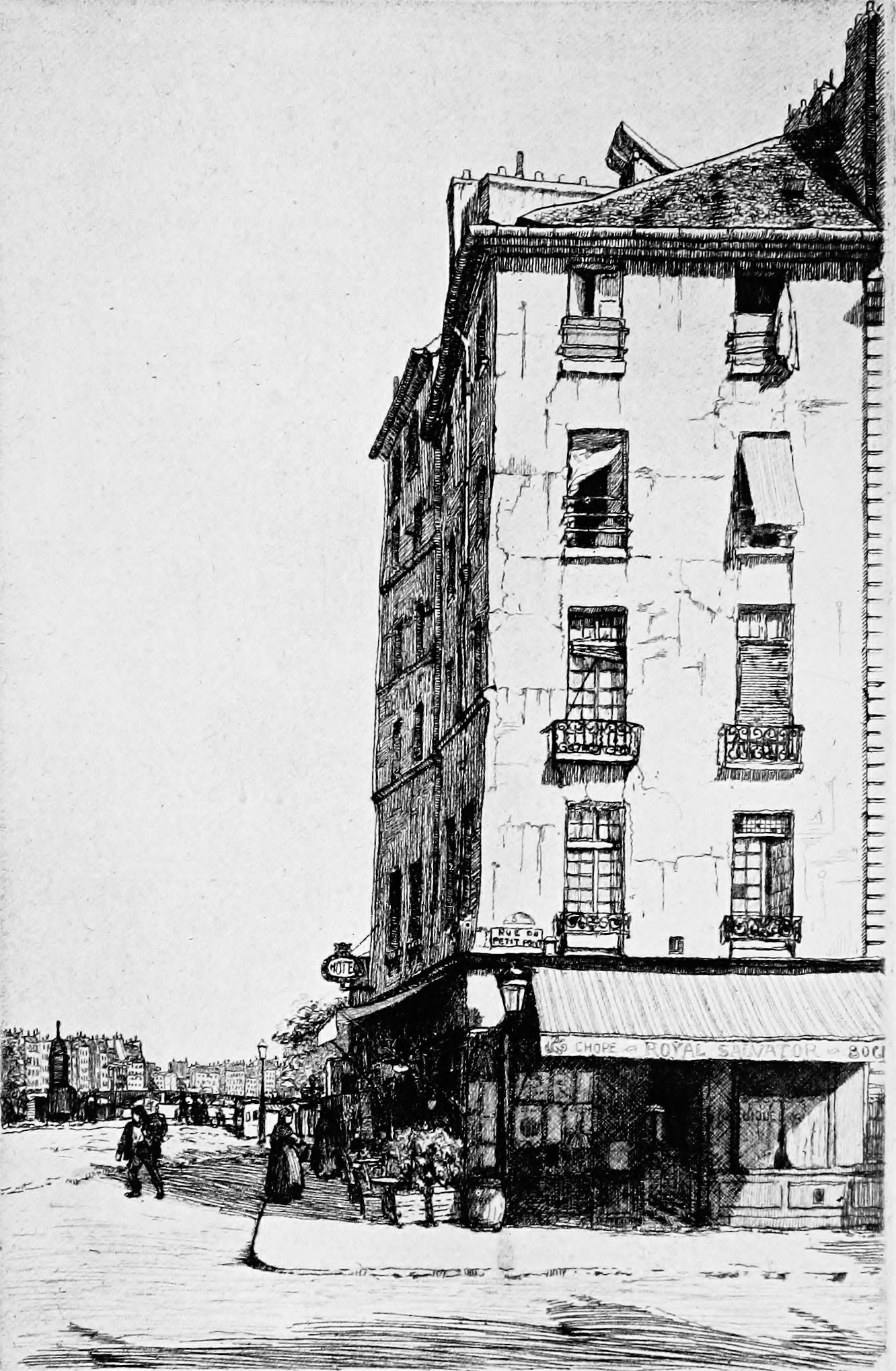
Sur le quai Montebello (1913).

Webster was born in New York City on April 6, 1878. His father, George Huntington Webster, was a partner in the New York division of the Armour business interests of Chicago; and it was as a sign of appreciation and respect that he named his child after his benefactors. The family later moved to Chicago, where Herman Webster grew up, after which he returned east to attend St. Paul’s School in Concord, New Hampshire. He went on to The Sheffield Scientific School at Yale University, Class of 1900, where he edited and contributed illustrations to campus humor magazine The Yale Record. Upon graduation he sailed to Europe to attend the 1900 Universal Exposition in Paris.

In Paris, he took art lessons from the Serbian muralist Alphonse Mucha (1860 – 1939). Over the next two years Webster would reside in Paris; contend with a bout of typhoid fever in Berlin; trek the Russian steppes on the Trans-Siberian Railway; puzzle over the mysteries of the Orient while visiting Beijing, Nagasaki, Yokohama, and Tokyo; and ultimately return home via the Pacific. He reached Chicago just before Christmas, 1901, and revealed to his family a desire to pursue the artist’s life in Paris. Webster's family was opposed to his career choice. Webster, however, would return to Paris in 1904, after spending two years unsuccessfully pursuing a business career in America, at his father's insistence. G. H. Webster finally resigned himself to his son's wishes: “All right, try it for a year.”

Upon his return to Paris, Webster enrolled at the Académie Julian, where he joined the studio of Jean-Paul Laurens (1838–1921), the Paris academician and professor at the École nationale supérieure des Beaux-Arts. It was there that Webster met Donald Shaw MacLaughlan (1876 – 1938), a Canadian artist already established as a significant presence in the Paris art scene. MacLaughlan was a practiced printmaker of considerable skill, as well as a teacher, and it was he who first taught Webster the craft of etching. It is said that Webster first became interested in etching after viewing a portfolio of prints made by the visionary French artist Charles Méryon (1821–1868) at the Bibliothèque Nationale. Webster may also have known of the work of James Abbott McNeill Whistler (1834–1903), the American artist whose eccentric personality and masterful prints captivated generations of young graphic artists. And Webster did take instruction from Eugène Béjot (1867–1931), the French printmaker whose views of Paris and the Seine perfectly depicted the buoyant spirit of Paris during the Belle Époque.

Webster’s first etchings consisted of small pastoral studies made in and around the Village of Grez in the Forest of Fontainebleau outside Paris. In 1905, Webster submitted three of these etchings at the Salon de La Societe Nationale des Beaux Arts. They were accepted, and he was noticed as a rising talent. He followed these with tours of Italy, Spain, and France, accompanied by Donald Shaw MacLaughlan. Together they made scores of sketches, studies, and renderings, many of which provided inspiration for their subsequent work. Upon his return to Paris, Webster established himself in a studio on the Rue de Furstenberg. His reputation grew quickly with the issuance of additional prints, and in 1907 Webster was made an associate of The Royal Society of Painter-Etchers in London, as well as a member of both the Société Nationale des Beaux-Arts and the National Academy of Design. In 1915 Webster was awarded the gold medal at The Panama-Pacific Exposition in San Francisco.

In 1910, Webster visited New York City, where he was impressed by the skyscrapers he saw, a building type unknown in Europe. He stayed long enough to make a series of drawings and at least one etching that captured the changing shape and structure of the city, and arranged for representation with the New York publisher and dealer Frederick Keppel & Company.

In 1914 Webster enlisted in the American Ambulance Corps in support of the Allied Forces during World War I, and served through 1917, when he was exposed to militarized gas. His eyesight was severely impaired forcing him to abandon the close, detailed work of etching in favor of watercolor and ink wash painting for a period of nearly ten years. Ironically, his watercolors from this period, and especially those made during his travels to Venice, are some of the most beautiful ever produced, and rival those of John Singer Sargent in their evocative fluidity and economy of means. His technique was orthodox Beaux Arts, using transparent layers of sepia ink or colored paint to suggest rather than depict a scene, and one cannot help but be reminded of the pen and brush fresco studies of Tiepolo. For his service to the nation of France, Webster was awarded the Croix de Guerre and made a Chevalier of The National Order of The Legion of Honor in 1926 (in 1956, his rank was elevated to Officer).

Webster died in Paris in 1970. In 1974 His personal papers, reference articles, correspondence, and estate prints were placed in the Archives of American Art, at The Smithsonian Institution by his wife, Moune G. H. Webster, as part of a commemorative exhibition of his work held by the National Collection of Fine Arts, and are preserved as an archive.
