= Hugh Aiken Bayne =

American judge (1870–1954)

- Born: Hugh Aiken Bayne; February 15, 1870; New Orleans, Louisiana, U.S.
- Died: December 24, 1954 (aged 84); New Haven, Connecticut, U.S.
- Education: Yale University
- Occupations: Lawyer; Judge Advocate; Lieutenant Colonel; Judge
- Employer(s): Strong & Cadwalader; Adjutant General's Office; Prisoners of War Mission; Liquidation Commission of the War Department; Inter-Allied Reparations Commission
- Known for: Judge on the Inter-Allied Reparations Commission under the treaties of Versailles and St. Germain
- Spouse: Helen (Cheney) Bayne
- Parent: Thomas Levingston Bayne
- Relatives: John Gayle (grandfather)
- Honors: Distinguished Service Medal; Légion d'honneur

Hugh Aiken Bayne (15 February 1870 in New Orleans – 24 December 1954 in New Haven, Connecticut) was the son of Thomas Levingston Bayne, a lawyer who fought in the Civil War. His grandfather John Gayle was a Congressman and Governor of Alabama.

Bayne attended Yale University, where he graduated in 1892 with an AB. While at Yale, he published The Tales of Temple Bar: A Prologue (1891), a collection of his comic writing for campus humor magazine The Yale Record. He was a member of Skull and Bones.

He later received an honorary LLD from Tulane University. In the same year he was admitted to the bar, and began the practice of law in New Orleans. Bayne moved to New York City in 1898, where he would continue the practice of law until 1919. From 1905 to 1914 he was a member of the storied law firm Strong & Cadwalader of New York City.

During World War I, he served as a major judge advocate in the Adjutant Generals Office, as a counsel on the Prisoners of War Mission and served on the Liquidation Commission of the War Department. He was made a lieutenant colonel in 1919, but he never fought in any battles. For his services he was decorated with the Distinguished Service Medal and the Légion d'honneur.

After the war, he served on the Reparation Commission under the treaties of Versailles and St. Germain. During this time he served as a judge deciding the claim of Belgium vs. Austria, regarding the Treasure of the Order of Golden Fleece. The King of Belgium requested that the treasure be transferred to him as the new ruler of the former Habsburg lands of the Austrian Netherlands. The three judges, of whom Bayne was one gave serious consideration to handing the treasure over to Belgium. However at the request of Emperor Carl, King Alfonso XIII of Spain intervened and the treasure remained in Austrian hands. He also handled the claim of Czecho-Slovakia being the successor to the Kingdom of Bohemia, and a claim regarding 500 works of art stolen from Bohemia by Austria between 1616 and 1914. One of the most interesting claims he handled was Standard Oil Co. vs. the Reparations Commission. The commission had appropriated 21 oil tankers owned by a Germany subsidiary of Standard Oil to pay for Germans reparations. He also handled cases on disarmament clauses.

On 8 October 1895 he married Helen Cheney (1868–1937), the sister of Knight Dexter Cheney, Jr., one of Bayne's classmates at Yale and brothers in Skull and Bones.
