= Robert L. Levers Jr. =

American artist

Robert L. Levers Jr. was an American artist and painter. He was born April 11, 1930, in Brooklyn, New York, and died February 6, 1992, in Austin, Texas. He received a B.F.A. (1952) and an M.F.A. (1961) from Yale University, then joined the faculty of the University of Texas, Austin, where he taught and painted for the rest of his life. His paintings explore conflict, chaos, destruction, and apocalyptic themes with a mordant humor.

== Early life and education ==
Robert L. Levers Jr. was born in Brooklyn, New York, in 1930, the son of Robert L. Levers, Sr., an Englishman with artistic interests, and Gertrude (Burrow) Levers. He attended Yale University in New Haven, Connecticut, and received a B.F.A. in 1952. In the early 1950s he was a teacher at the Whitney Art School in New Haven, Connecticut, and also worked at the J. Walter Thompson advertising agency in New York City. Levers married Mary Lou Schlichting in 1954 and they had two daughters and a son. He served as a gunnery officer in the United States Navy from 1954 to 1957, mostly in the Caribbean during peacetime. After his service in the Navy, he worked at the "Famous Artists School", a correspondence school based in Westport, Connecticut, where he learned how to teach, and further develop his drawing skills. He returned to Yale University, where he studied under Josef Albers and earned his M.F.A. in 1959 to 1961. A solo exhibition of his work was held at the Columbia Museum in Columbia, South Carolina, in 1959 and his work was included in an exhibition at the Wadsworth Atheneum Museum of Art in Hartford, Connecticut, in 1960. Levers taught at Yale for one year before moving to Texas.

== Career and exhibitions ==
In 1961, Levers joined the faculty of the University of Texas, Austin, where he taught painting and drawing until his death in 1992. He received several honors, including a Ford Foundation Faculty Grant, teaching-excellence awards in 1963 and 1984, and he was named the Leslie Waggener Professor of Fine Arts in 1987. Among his notable students were Luis Jiménez and Millie Wilson. His work was selected for inclusion in the Corcoran Gallery of Art's 27th Biennial Exhibition in Washington D.C. in 1961 and for an exhibition at the New York World's Fair in 1964. In 1980, he was awarded a fellowship from the National Endowment for the Arts. Lever's work was included in the prestigious 41st Venice Biennale in 1984, titled "Paradise Lost/Paradise Regained: American Visions of the New Decade", which continued on an international tour including: the New Museum of Contemporary Art, New York; Calouste Gulbenkian Museum, Lisbon, Portugal; Círculo de Bellas Artes, Madrid, Spain; The National Gallery, Athens, Greece; The King St. Stephens Museum, Szekesfehervar, Budapest, Hungary; State Art and Sculpture Museum, Ankara, Turkey.

Robert Levers work has been shown throughout the United States; he listed 135 "selected exhibitions" on his CV. His paintings have been included in exhibitions at The Contemporary Arts Center, New Orleans (1982), Aspen Art Museum, Aspen (1987), University of Colorado Art Gallery, Boulder (1988), and the Arkansas Arts Center, Little Rock (1989). In 1990 the exhibition "Northwest by Southwest: Painted Fictions" included his work and toured several museums and universities across the USA: Palm Springs Art Museum in Palm Desert, California; Yellowstone Art Museum, Billings, Montana; Western Gallery, Western Washington State University, Bellingham; Blaffer Art Museum, University of Houston, Texas.

Robert Levers's paintings have been exhibited in several art museums in Texas including: The Museum of Fine Arts, Houston; The Contemporary Arts Museum Houston; Dallas Museum of Art; Modern Art Museum of Fort Worth; Blanton Museum of Art (Huntington Art Gallery), Austin; Laguna Gloria Art Museum, Austin; Witte Museum, San Antonio; Abilene Fine Arts Museum; Amarillo Art Center; Art Museum of Southeast Texas, Beaumont; Art Museum of South Texas, Corpus Christi; El Paso Museum of Art; Tyler Museum of Art; Waco Art Center. In 1991 a retrospective exhibit of his work was organized by Austin's Laguna Gloria Art Museum; it toured Texas in 1991 and 1992.

=== Collections ===
- Blanton Museum of Art (Huntington Art Gallery), University of Texas, Austin
- Modern Art Museum of Fort Worth, Texas
- Museum of Fine Arts, Houston, Texas
- The Old Jail Art Center, Albany, Texas
- Texas Fine Arts Association, Austin, Texas
- Art Museum of Southeast Texas, Beaumont, Texas

== Media ==
Levers worked in traditional art media, predominantly oils, watercolor, and pen-and-ink, but also egg tempera paintings, pastels, gouaches, chalk, charcoal, and mixed media pieces with various combinations. Exceptions include a number of construction pieces from the early 1970s, in which drawings and watercolors of combat figures and explosions were cutout and collaged onto pieces of wood cut to matching shapes. These figures stand on painted wooden bases, some with drawn/collaged backdrops. Levers was also a printmaker, particularly in the last 20 years of his life, working with the Peregrine Press in Dallas and the Flatbed Press in Austin among others, producing aquatints, etching, and lithographs.

== Stylistic development, and subjects ==
Early Work 1950-1972: Although Levers exhibited during the late 1950s through the early 1970s, his work before 1973 is absent from exhibition catalogues after 1973 and his retrospective exhibit in 1991. He drew cartoons for the Yale Record in the 1950s and is known to have made watercolors of people's homes to help fund his college tuition. His early work has been compared to Sidney Dickinson's and described as "a misty realistic style". While at Yale, Levers took Josef Albers' "Interaction of Color" course, forming the basis of his concepts on color for the rest of his career and some of his work from the 1950s varied from geometric abstraction to abstract expressionism. Ultimately, Levers rejected abstraction in his own art, but he always valued Albers' instruction and liked him personally. After moving to Texas in 1961, the family begin visiting Mexico with some degree of regularity in 1963. He spent much of his sabbatical time in Mexico City painting and drawing with frequent trips to the National Museum of Anthropology and other galleries, as well as a trip to the Yucatán Peninsula to view Mayan ruins. However those influence were said to have been "so deeply absorbed as to be invisible in his art". On one visit to Mexico City during the 1968 Olympic Games, he witnessed protesting students clash with riot police, an event that was to influence his work, contributing to a shift toward figurative painting and an exploration of themes in conflict and violence.

Mid Period 1973-1982: Levers produced drawings and watercolors that made up a substantial part of his output in the early to mid 1970s. Many pieces from this period (including oil paintings) appear in compartmental and fragmented compositions, sometimes resembling comic strips. However, these strips do not illustrate a clear linear narrative, as one author noted "Levers' strip-form designs defy attempts to tell their stories: as comic strips they are frustrating." Levers' works of the 1970s are populated with figures of combat and conflict like soldiers, rioters, and even hostile red-necks in overalls. As he had witnessed in Mexico City 's riots, faces are often concealed by gas mask, later diversifying to gas mask tubes attached directly to the faces, red, white and blue erect wind socks, and bazooka barrels, or skulls for heads. Still others have heads that appear to be made of spare parts from ventriloquist's dummies. More often than not these figures are engaged in some short of conflict, running the gamut from wrestling and fist fights to full-scale military battles where exploding artillery fills the air: people engaged in tragicomic exercises in futility. His painting The Battle (1979) in the collection of the Museum of Fine Arts, Houston is exemplary of his work from this period (see External links below). Superficially, Levers work can sometimes have vague affinities to Surrealism or Magic Realism but neither term can really be applied to his paintings accurately.

The late 1970s and early 1980s mark a period of maturation in Levers work, in style, technique, subject matter, and content. "Pop art and comic strips offered him an initial point of departure in his works of the 1960s; however, by the mid-1970s his references had broadened". Another author made the analogy "a composer of songs expanding to oratorio and finally to opera." Like Goya, who produced tapestry designs and portraits into his 40s then budded into a master late in life, Levers' work showed a significant growth in his late 40s. "The consistent development of his style manifests an intellectual power that the humor, earthiness, and fantasy of his subjects might mask for the casual observer." Starting about 1979 the predominance of drawings begin to swing to increasing numbers of oil paintings. Faces and heads were increasingly represented with natural features, albeit occasionally masked or hooded. After receiving a National Endowment for the Arts Artists Fellowship, he lived full-time in New York City for a time in 1980–81, absorbing the wealth of art in the museums there, particularly the old masters (e.g. Giovanni Domenico Tiepolo and his Punchinellos).

Late Work 1983-1992: "The Destruction of Memorial Stadium seems to announce a larger theater of ideas". Levers stated "One night I had a dream about Memorial Stadium [University of Texas, Austin] burning down. In my dream, it had been capable of accommodating a million people, all of whom were scurrying around, many with banners. It was a troubling dream; I had no idea what it meant or why I'd had it, but since I usually make art to find out what I think and feel, I began a painting".The Destruction of Memorial Stadium (1983), a 40 x 50 inch canvas, was accompanied by an entire series of paintings depicting the chaos going on as the monument burned: the artist said "riots, orgies, the summary execution of the presumed arsonist. . . whole subcultures of bogus, berserk and violent referees doing vaudeville turns". . . "By fits and starts this world would be funny and then sad and sometimes both at the same time. I sensed people locked into rituals of behavior - loveable, in way, pitiable in other ways, maybe like all of us." The Memorial Stadium series was followed by more interrelated cycles of paintings, apocalyptic metaphors, some with iconic and monumental architecture, ranging from the LBJ Presidential Library (1985) to the Tower of Babel (1991), under siege by terrorist and going up in smoke and flames. Another informal series portrays hooded terrorists in bullfighting rings and other arenas ineptly juggling plates and other peculiar activities.

Levers made his first trip to Europe to participate in the Venice Biennale in 1984; he later stated "My purpose was to research Renaissance and Baroque figure painting, make notes and sketches, and return home to begin a series of large paintings involving life-size or nearly life-size figures." His subject matter broadened beyond apocalypse and destruction in his later years and other subjects begin to appear in his work e.g.: Mutatis Mutandis, Incorporated (1984, 72 x 90 inches, oil on canvas) depicts an ominous gust of wind descending on four suited executives; the self-descriptive God Creating Animals (1989, 60 x 90 inches, oil on canvas); Taking Care of Old People (1990, 17 x 22 inches, mixed media drawing) recalls some of the symbolist graphic work of Odilon Redon and Alfred Kubin.

In his 1985 book on contemporary American art, Edward Lucie-Smith stated "The presence of a visionary satirist of this quality in the ranks of Texan artists is one of the great surprises of an art scene which is surprising in many other ways as well." His paintings allude to mêlées, violence, and ruin; yet presented absurdly, nearly comical at times, a seemingly incongruous combination with a troubling tone that resonate in his finest work. In one statement from 1980s Levers said "The work always has a layer of humor, I notice, even when the nominal subject is dead serious. I prefer not to consider this a limitation but instead an opportunity to make the picture richer". . . "I hope I live long enough to paint almost all - God forbid absolutely all - the pictures I think I can feel behind my forehead". Levers died of a heart attack at the age of 61.

== Bibliography ==
- Carlozzi, Annette, Gay Block, and Laurel Jones (1986). 50 Texas Artist: A Critical Selection of Painters and Sculptors Working in Texas. Chronicle Books, San Francisco. 120 pp. ISBN 0-87701-399-3
- Lucie-Smith, Edward (1985). American Art Now. William Morrow and Company, Inc. New York, New York. 160 pp. ISBN 0-688-05884-1
- Greene, Alison de Lima (2000). Texas: 150 Works from the Museum of Fine Arts, Houston. Harry N. Abrams, Inc., Publishers. New York, New York, 279 pp. ISBN 0-8109-6706-5
- Grieder, Terence (1979). Robert Levers: Paintings, Drawings, and Constructions. University of Texas, Austin, Texas. 28 pp. Library of Congress Catalogue Card No. 79-51124
- Meats, Peter, Terence Grieder, and Joan Seeman Robinson (1991). The Art of Robert Levers: A Retrospective. Laguna Gloria Art Museum. Austin Texas. 32 pp. Library of Congress Catalogue Card No. 91-075325
- Plake Hough, Katherine, Michael Zakian, Iona Chelette, and Marti Mayo (1990). Northwest by Southwest: Painted Fictions. Palm Springs Desert Museum, Palm Springs. 116 pp. ISBN 978-9992172964
- Smith, Mark Lesly, Katherine Brimberry, and Susan Tallman (2016). Flatbed Press at 25. University of Texas Press. Austin. 432 pp. ISBN 978-1477310083
- Tucker, Marcia, Ned Rifkin and Lynn Gumpert (1984). Paradise Lost/Paradise Regained: American Visions of the New Decade. Venice: La 41a Biennale de Venezia, United States Pavilion. New Museum of Contemporary Art, New York. 127 pp.
