= Clovis Heimsath =

American architect (1930–2021)

Clovis Heimsath, FAIA (October 25, 1930 – October 10, 2021) was an American architect with significant contributions to both architectural scholarship and modern architecture, particularly in Texas. He was born in New Haven, Connecticut and educated at Yale, where he was an editorial associate of campus humor magazine The Yale Record. Heimsath died on October 10, 2021, at the age of 90.

== Noteworthy buildings ==
Newman Hall at Texas Southern University

Becker Library at St. Stephens Episcopal School

Sanctuary at Episcopal Church of the Epiphany

== Awards ==
- Fulbright Scholarship
- Admission to the American Institute of Architects College of Fellows

== Publications ==
- Pioneer Texas Buildings
- Behavioral Architecture
- Geometry in Architecture: Texas Buildings Yesterday and Today
