= Eugene Kingman =

American cartographer and painter

- Born: November 10, 1909; Providence, Rhode Island; United States
- Died: February 20, 1975 (aged 65); Lubbock, Texas; United States
- Education: Yale University; Rhode Island School of Design; Fogg Art Museum
- Occupations: Cartographer, Artist, Curator, Museum Director
- Employer(s): Rhode Island School of Design in Providence, Rhode Island; Joslyn Art Museum in Omaha, Nebraska; Texas Tech Museum in Lubbock, Texas
- Known for: landscape paintings, public murals

Eugene Kingman (1909–1975) was an American cartographer, painter, muralist, teacher and museum director.

== Biography ==
Kingman was born in 1909 in Providence, Rhode Island. He studied extensively at the Rhode Island School of Design (with John Frazier, Frederic Sisson and Nancy Jones) during high school, and for a year after high school, Kingman studied at the Fogg Art Museum with Edward Forbes and Paul Sachs. The entirety of his formal higher education was spent at Yale University, where he obtained both a BA and an MFA, and contributed cartoons to campus humor magazine The Yale Record.

Early in his career (he was in his third year at Yale), he was commissioned by Horace M. Albright to paint seven paintings of park scenes at Sequoia, Mt. Rainier, Grand Teton, Grand Canyon, Yellowstone, Yosemite and Crater Lake.

In 1946, The New York Times commissioned Kingman to paint a mural for their newly renovated lobby at 229 West 43rd Street in New York City. He settled on an image of the earth as if the observer was suspended over Newfoundland. Above the horizon was the line from a Sarah Chauncey Woolsey poem, "Every day is a fresh beginning - every morn is the world made new". The mural spent four decades in the lobby and was then moved to storage. On June 16, 2016, the recently restored mural was installed in the lobby of the W. Dale Clark Library in Omaha, Nebraska, the city where the mural was started, in the basement of the Joslyn Art Museum there.

Among other projects, he received Section of Painting and Sculpture commissions to paint United States post office murals. In Hyattsville, Maryland, his single mural was untitled; in Kemmerer, Wyoming; he painted a three-panel set with various titles in 1938; and in 1939 in East Providence, Rhode Island; he completed an oil-on-wall five-panel with various titles.

Kingman taught at Rhode Island School of Design for three years, soon after which he joined the OSS as a cartographer.

After World War II, Kingman became director of the Joslyn Art Museum. In addition, he acted as consultant to the Smithsonian Institution, and to the U.S. Corps of Engineers for their exhibit of the Missouri River Powerhouse.

He died in 1975.

== Style ==
From an early age, Eugene Kingman painted landscapes. He worked in a high contrast manner, putting highlights and shade next to each other with little blending. This could have either been a result of, or the reason for, using acrylic paint, which dries quite quickly. The high contrast creates quite a dramatic rendering, which is reinforced by the use of intense, saturated colors. The surface of the canvases are rough with the marks of Kingman's paint application, most likely with a palette knife. The lighting in Kingman's scenes feels quite harsh, due in part to the use of unmodified whites and yellows as highlights, and also because of the sharp juxtaposition of highlights and shadows.
