= Eden Collinsworth =

American businesswoman and writer

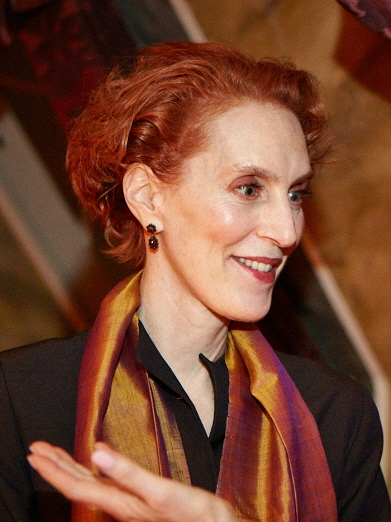
- Education: BA, Bennington College
- Occupations: Businesswoman and writer
- Spouse: William Hamilton (m. 1986–2003)
- Children: 1
- Website: www.edencollinsworth.com

Eden Collinsworth is an American writer of fiction and non-fiction, whose career has been in media and international business.

== Career ==
Collinsworth began her career in book publishing at Doubleday & Company. She joined Arbor House Book Publishing Company in 1976, and was named its president and publisher in 1983.

Collinsworth founded Buzz, Inc. In October 1990, with two partners, Allan Mayer, and Susan Gates, Collinsworth, as president and CEO, launched Buzz Magazine, a Los Angeles-based monthly, city magazine.

From 1999 to 2008, Collinsworth was vice president of The Hearst Corporation and its director of cross media business development responsible for identifying business opportunities across all Hearst divisions, including magazines, newspapers, cable, syndication, and broadcast.

In 2008, Collinsworth became vice president, COO and chief of staff of The EastWest Institute, an international think tank.

In 2011, Collinsworth launched Collinsworth & Associates, a Beijing-based consulting company, which specializes in intercultural communication. She is the author of a book on the subject published by Xiron in China.

== Publications ==
- It Might Have Been What He Said (2006) – a novel
- The Strangeness of Men and Women – a play
- I Stand Corrected: How Teaching Manners in China Became Its Own Unforgettable Lesson (2014) - a memoir
- Behaving Badly: The New Morality in Politics, Sex, and Business (2017) – non-fiction
- What the Ermine Saw: The Extraordinary Journey of Leonardo's da Vinci's Most Mysterious Portrait (2022) - non-fiction
- The Improbable Victoria Woodhull: Suffrage, Free Love, and the First Woman to Run for President (2025) - non-fiction
