= Montanan (magazine) =

University of Montana's alumni magazine

- Editor-in-Chief: John Heaney '02
- Categories: Alumni magazine
- Frequency: Tri-yearly
- Circulation: 80,000
- Publisher: University of Montana
- Founded: 1983
- Country: United States
- Language: English
- Website: montanan.umt.edu

The Montanan is the University of Montana's (UM) alumni magazine with a circulation of over 113,000 - making it the largest circulating magazine from Montana, United States. It is one of eleven publications of the University of Montana's University Relations published in its current state since 1983 though Montanan as a magazine has been published at the university since at least 1920.

== Description ==
The magazine's goals are to inform its readers about accomplishments and advances at the university, as well as inspire loyalty that will keep alumni connected to UM throughout their lives.

Each issue is divided into four main sections:

1. Features
2. Around the Oval
3. About Alumni
4. Artifacts

== Awards ==
- It is the university’s institutional magazine and won a Silver Award in the magazine category of the CASE District VIII competition. The magazine is edited by Joan Melcher of University Relations. A Montanan feature story on John Craighead, an internationally known scientist who spent 25 years in research at UM, won a CASE Bronze Award. Melcher also won a Merit Award in the Admissions Marketing Advertising Awards competition for copy writing in a Montanan ad.
- The Montanan won the 2005 Distinguished Achievement Award in the Most Improved Magazine category in the Association of Educational Publishers competition. Editor Joan Melcher led a year-long redesign effort that premiered with the fall 2004 issue of the magazine. In addition, the Montanan was named a finalist in two similar categories in competition sponsored by the Association of Western Publishers.
- Twenty-Fifth Annual Educational Advertising Awards
  - Merit Award for External Publication

== Related publications ==
Other publications of the University of Montana's University relations include:

- Main Hall to Main Street Connecting Campus and Community
- The President's Report UM's annual report
- Research View Newsletter about UM research
- Vision Annual magazine dedicated to research and innovation
- Montana's Agenda Issues Shaping Our State

== See also ==
- List of alumni magazines
