= William Hamilton (cartoonist) =

American cartoonist and playwright

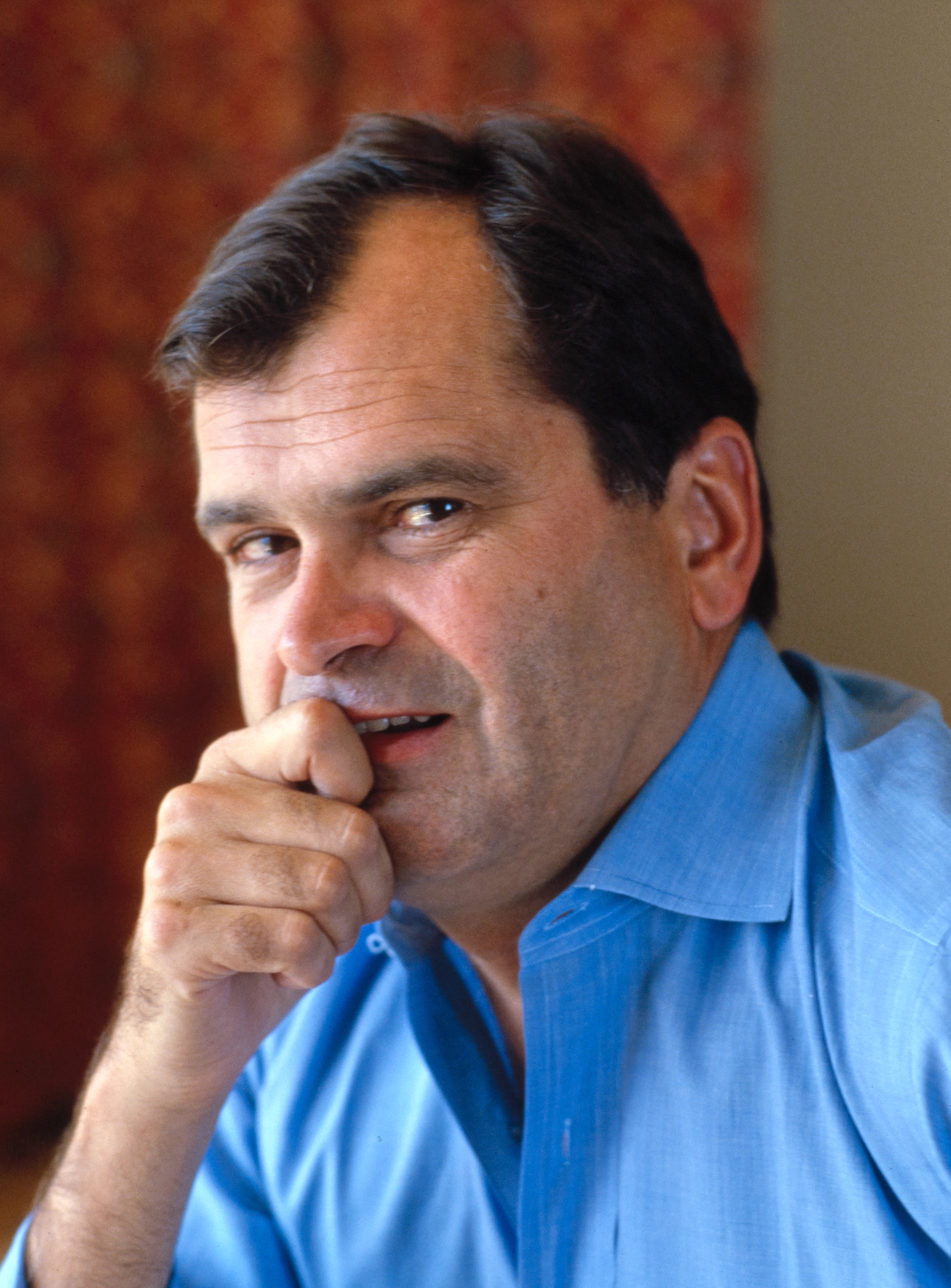
- Hamilton in 1985
- Born: June 2, 1939; Palo Alto, California, U.S.
- Died: April 8, 2016 (aged 76); Lexington, Kentucky, U.S.
- Education: Phillips Academy; Yale University
- Occupations: Cartoonist; playwright; novelist
- Employer: The New Yorker (1965-2016)
- Spouses: Candida Vargas (m. 1969–1976) Eden Collinsworth (m. 1986–2003) Lucy Young Hamilton (m. 2003–2016)

William Hamilton (June 2, 1939 – April 8, 2016) was an American cartoonist and playwright. He was most closely associated with the magazine The New Yorker.

== Biography ==
Hamilton was born in Palo Alto, California in 1939. Hamilton grew up on the family estate Ethelwild in St. Helena, California. While he came from a moneyed family great-grandson of Mark Lyndsay McDonald, his father was an unemployed, free-spending eccentric amateur inventor. Hamilton later said "We lived on one of those dwindling trust funds with a hint of money in the past, but not much in the present". The house, inherited from an uncle, was much as it was in 1901, and Hamilton tells of ancient pencils that shattered upon use. Hamilton's interest in cartooning was sparked by stacks of European magazines found in the house.

Hamilton attended Phillips Academy, where the relatively poor Hamilton studied alongside the children of the wealthy. He said that the experience of being "out of place" was "an ideal experience for going into the arts" and "the process of being an alien gives you the distance to be an artist." He went on to Yale, where he drew cartoons and covers for campus humor magazine The Yale Record and was a member of Skull and Bones. He graduated from Yale in 1962 with a degree in English.

While serving in the US Army (1963–5) he sold his first cartoon to The New Yorker in 1965. In the World Encyclopedia of Cartoons, Richard Calhoun describes Hamilton's work:

His close-up renderings of features have more the quality of preliminary portrait sketches than of caricature ... His humor also tends to be of a rather personal stamp—very much New York, corporate and Ivy League in setting, and dedicated to the deflation of intellectual pretension and cliché ... those familiar with the rather hermetic environment he satirizes will laugh (or wince) at his thrusts. Especially keen are his frequent variations upon the theme of the cocktail party—surely one of civilization's most persistent forms of self-inflicted torture. The drink is innocuous, the food familiar, and the topics of conversation hopelessly predictable.

His friend Lewis H. Lapham described Hamilton's work: "You were never in doubt about who the cartoonist was. He had a particular beat, as it were — the preppy world, the world of Ralph Lauren, the Protestant WASP establishment that was on their way out, holding onto their diminishing privileges."

In 1969, Hamilton married Candida Vargas, granddaughter of Getúlio Vargas, dictator of Brazil. They separated in 1976. The disintegration of his marriage prompted his turn to playwriting, and his first play Save Grand Central was "about the middle of the end of a marriage." Hamilton's plays document the same world as his cartoons, and sometimes recycle lines from his cartoons. His play White Chocolate has been described as "a farce about race and class in the upper echelons of New York society."

Hamilton married Eden Collinsworth in 1986. The marriage produced a son and ended in divorce circa 2003.

Hamilton married Lucy Young Hamilton in 2003. Hamilton died in a car accident in Lexington, Kentucky, on April 8, 2016. He was 76. He was survived by his wife, along with his children Gilliam Collinsworth Hamilton and Alexandra Hamilton Kimball.

== Bibliography ==
=== Cartoons ===
- The Anti-Social Register, Chronicle Books, 1974.
- Terribly Nice People, Putnam, 1975.
- Husbands, Wives and Live-Togethers, Putnam, 1976.
- Introducing William Hamilton, Wildwood (London), 1977.
- Money Should Be Fun, Houghton, 1979.
- The Men Will Fear You, and the Women Will Adore You, St. Martin's Press, 1986.
- Voodoo Economics, Chronicle Books, 1992.
- My goodness, I had no idea people from California had ancestors!

=== Novels ===
- The Love of Rich Women, Houghton, 1980.
- The Charlatan, Simon and Schuster, 1985.
- The Lap of Luxury, Atlantic Monthly Press, 1988.

=== Plays ===
- Save Grand Central, 1976
- Plymouth Rock, 1977
- Happy Landings, 1982
- Interior Decoration, 1988
- White Chocolate, 2004
