= William Anthony (artist) =

American artist (1934–2022)

- Born: William Graham Anthony; September 25, 1934; Fort Monmouth, New Jersey, U.S.
- Died: December 24, 2022 (aged 88); New York City, New York, U.S.
- Education: Yale University; Art Students League of New York; San Francisco Art Institute
- Known for: Painting
- Spouse: Norma Anthony

William Anthony (September 25, 1934 – December 24, 2022) was an American painter and illustrator.

== Life and career ==
William Anthony was born in Fort Monmouth, New Jersey on September 25, 1934. He attended Yale University, getting his undergraduate degree in history and serving as a senior editor for campus humor magazine The Yale Record. While attending Yale, he took a series of art classes, including one taught by Josef Albers. In 1958 and 1961 he attended the Art Students League of New York.

After graduating from Yale University, he went to California, where his family had moved and attended classes at the San Francisco Art Institute. In 1962 he began teaching drawing at a commercial art school in San Francisco and developed a method of drawing that resulted in the book A New Approach to Figure Drawing. In 1964 he returned to New York. From 1977 to 1978 he created illustrations for Interview and published another book called Bible Stories. In 1983 he married Norma Neuman. His work is held in the collection of the Museum of Modern Art. Anthony's work has recently been shown at the Christopher Henry Gallery in New York City. His most recent exhibition of which was highly influenced by the work of Picasso.

Anthony died on December 24, 2022, from injuries sustained in a December 17 apartment fire at Westbeth Artists Community, his longtime home. He was 88.
