= William Churchill (ethnologist) =

Logic

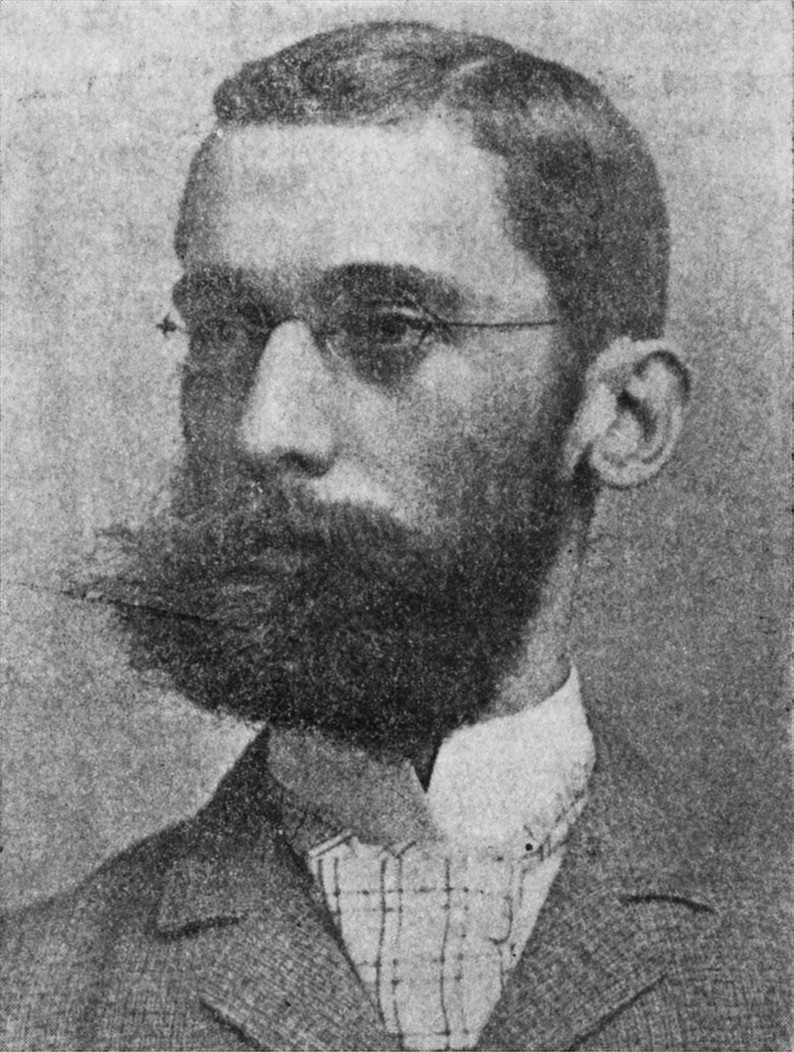
- Churchill in 1896.
- Born: William Churchill; October 5, 1859; Brooklyn, New York, U.S.
- Died: June 9, 1920 (aged 60); Washington, D.C., U.S.
- Education: Yale University
- Occupations: Polynesian ethnologist and philologist consul general to Samoa and Tonga
- Employer(s): Federal government of the United States; New York Sun; Carnegie Institution
- Known for: A Princess of Fiji (1892); The Polynesian Wanderings, Tracks of the Migration Deduced from an Examination of the Proto-Samoan Content of Efaté and other Languages of Melanesia (1910); Beach-la-Mar, the Jargon or Trade Speech of the Western Pacific (1911); Easter Island, Rapanui Speech and the Peopling of Southeast Polynesia (1912); The Subanu, Studies of a Sub-Visayan Mountain Folk of Mindanao (1913)
- Spouse: Llewella (Pierce) Churchill
- Parent(s): William Churchill; Sarah Jane (Starkweather) Churchill
- Honors: F.R.A.I. Archaeological Institute of America; Association of American Geographers; Order of Leopold II

William Churchill, FRAI, AIA, AAG (October 5, 1859 – June 9, 1920) was an American Polynesian ethnologist and philologist, born in Brooklyn, New York, and educated at Yale, where he wrote for campus humor magazine The Yale Record. In 1896 he became consul general to Samoa. In 1897 his commission was extended, making him also Consul General to Tonga. In 1902 he began working for New York Sun, where he later became a member of the editorial staff. In 1915, he took a position as research associate in primitive philology at the Carnegie Institution in Washington, D.C.

While working for the Committee on Public Information during World War I, he suffered a skull fracture inflicted by an enemy spy.

== Biography ==
Churchill was born in Brooklyn. In 1881, he enrolled at Yale University but had to suspend his studies for health reasons. He returned to Yale in 1882 and excelled in writing and public speaking. Churchill contributed articles to the university’s newspapers and was active in the Yale Natural History Society. After graduating, he taught for a year in Indianapolis before embarking on a long journey across the South Pacific Islands. After an extended stay in Samoa where he studied the local language, he visited Australia, New Zealand, and Fiji, where he managed a business.

Upon returning to the United States, Churchill worked in journalism in the San Francisco area. For a time, he was a reporter and associate editor of the Oakland Times and served as the librarian at the San Francisco Academy of Sciences, where he gave lectures on the indigenous peoples of the South Pacific. He later moved to the eastern United States and continued contributing articles to newspapers. In 1891, he became the literary editor of the Brooklyn Times until June 1896, when President Grover Cleveland appointed him as Consul General in Samoa, and in 1897, his appointment was extended to include Tonga.

He returned to the United States in 1898 and resumed working in journalism, becoming the literary editor at the Sun newspaper in New York. In 1915, he relocated to Washington, D.C., as a research associate at the Carnegie Institution for Science in the field of primitive philology. At the onset of World War I, he joined the Committee on Public Information and was responsible for news censorship and managing foreign language publications. During this role, he was beaten and had his skull fractured by what was described in his obituary as an "enemy spy." In 1920, he was awarded the Order of Leopold II for his service to Belgium during the war.

William Churchill died of pneumonia on June 9, 1920, after suffering from the illness for nearly a year.

Churchill was a prolific writer whose work included scientific articles, magazine pieces, reviews, and books on the life and customs of the indigenous peoples of the South Pacific Islands. He specialized in languages and collected folklore. He prepared a dictionary of the Samoan language and improved maps of the South Pacific Islands. He was a member of several scientific organizations, including the Royal Anthropological Institute of Great Britain and Ireland and the American Association for the Advancement of Science.

== Selected works ==
- A Princess of Fiji (1892)
- Samoa o le Vavau (1902)
- The Polynesian Wanderings, Tracks of the Migration Deduced from an Examination of the Proto-Samoan Content of Efaté and other Languages of Melanesia (1910)
- Beach-la-Mar, the Jargon or Trade Speech of the Western Pacific (1911)
- Easter Island, Rapanui Speech and the Peopling of Southeast Polynesia (1912)
- The Subanu, Studies of a Sub-Visayan Mountain Folk of Mindanao (1913)
