= Rumpus (magazine) =

Yale College tabloid publication

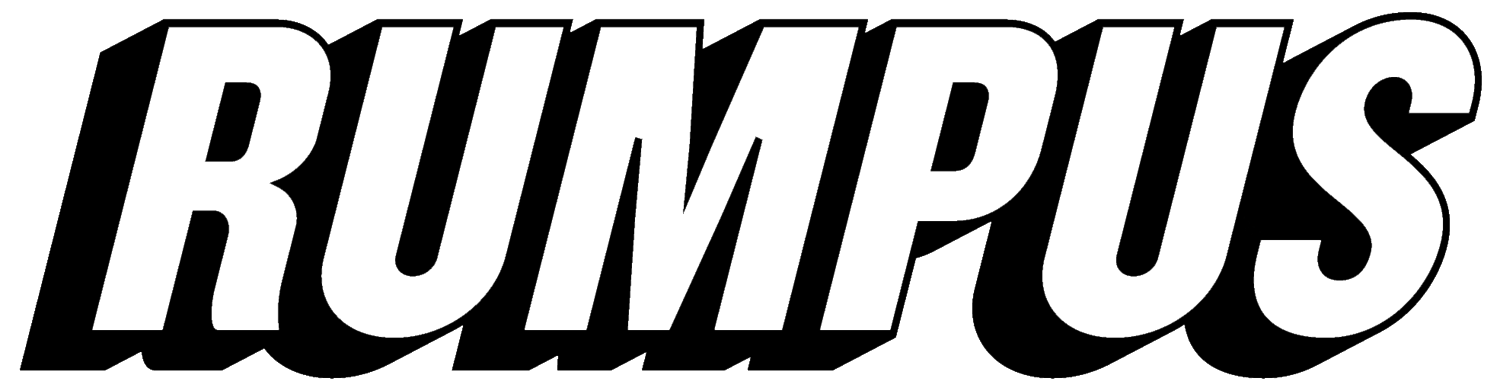
- Categories: Humor magazine
- Circulation: Print magazine
- Founder: Ryan Craig Euny Hong
- Founded: 1992, Yale University
- Based in: New Haven, Connecticut
- Language: English
- Website: https://yalerumpus.net/

Rumpus is a tabloid publication produced six times a year by students at Yale College in New Haven, Connecticut. Visually resembling the New York Post, Rumpus is a controversial, humorous publication with content ranging from campus gossip to investigative reporting.

== History ==
Rumpus was first published in fall 1992 by Yale Record contributor Ryan Craig, Euny Hong, and other members of the Classes of 1994 and 1995. Rumpus claims to be the "Oldest College Tabloid," a play on both the Yale Daily News ("Oldest College Daily") and the Yale Record ("Oldest College Humor Magazine").

The founders of Rumpus aimed to write "to be read" by fellow students; its motto is "The only magazine at Yale about Stuff at Yale." According to the Rumpus website, "Once upon a time, print media was dying. Then, Rumpus was born. A little blue pill of light, truth, and humanity." Rumpus is primarily a print-only edition.

== Features ==
Rumpus' annual "Yale's Fifty Most Beautiful People" list features glamour shots and profiles of the 25 most attractive male students and the 25 most attractive female students of Yale College. "Rumpus Rumpus" is a column devoted to rumors and embarrassing campus hijinks. "Remedial Media" critiques other campus publications including the Yale Daily News and the Yale Herald. Rumpus also closely follows the doings of Yale's secret societies, including Skull and Bones, to which both Presidents George H. W. Bush and George W. Bush belonged when they were seniors at Yale. The magazine regularly exposes membership lists and once even infiltrated the Skull and Bones retreat at Deer Iland (sic) in Canada. In July 2024, a New York Times profile of Usha Vance, the wife of 2024 United States presidential election candidate JD Vance for vice president, revealed that she was featured in the 2006 edition of Rumpus' 50 Most Beautiful People issue.

== Controversies ==
Rumpus was sued for libel in 1997 by a local New Haven landlord and ultimately settled the case.

In spring 2001, Rumpus closely followed First Daughter and Yale student Barbara Bush. One article, cited by the Washington Post and other publications around the globe, detailed an incident where Bush and her friends escaped from the assigned Secret Service detail by stranding them at a tollbooth. (Bush was on her way to see a wrestling match at Madison Square Garden.) Barbara's driver had an E-ZPass and the Secret Service did not, which put the Secret Service agents in a position where they had to race at a high speed to catch up with the First Daughter. The Barbara article received attention at the highest levels in the Secret Service and the White House, prompting the Yale administration to request that Rumpus pull the issue from their website for security concerns.

In April 2006, Rumpus was accused of insensitivity by the Asian American Students Association (AASA) and other cultural organizations on campus when the magazine published two articles about racial stereotyping. Rumpus claimed that the articles were intended to ridicule racial stereotyping, not endorse the practice. AASA requested that both Rumpus and the Yale Herald (accused of the same insensitivity) be defunded by the Yale College administration. This request was not granted.

In September 2018, Rumpus retracted their annual First-Year issue after backlash against jokes the issue made about sexual assault. The publication apologized, and twelve staffers left their positions.

The following year, Rumpus returned to campus and is currently still publishing articles.

== Founders ==
- Ryan Craig, education and workforce development specialist
- Euny Hong, writer and journalist
