= Gordon M. Kaufman =

American management professor

- Born: United States
- Education: Yale University; Harvard University
- Awards: IAMG Distinguished Lectureship
- Scientific career
- Fields: Bayesian econometrics Multivariate analysis Risk analysis Geostatistics
- Workplaces: Massachusetts Institute of Technology

Gordon M. Kaufman is Morris A. Adelman Professor of Management, Emeritus Professor of Statistics at the MIT Sloan School of Management, Massachusetts Institute of Technology since 2014. The International Association for Mathematical Geosciences appointed him as the Distinguished Lecturer for 2015.

In 1985 he was elected as a Fellow of the American Statistical Association.

== Education ==
- BS in industrial and electrical engineering, Yale University (where he was a business associate of campus humor magazine The Yale Record)
- MBA Harvard University
- DBA Harvard University

== Selected books ==
- Gordon M. Kaufman (2011), Risk Analysis: From Prospect to Exploration Portfolio and Back. Nabu Press, 66 p.
- Gordon M. Kaufman, Patrick J. Lee (1992), Are Wildcat Well Outcomes Dependent Or Independent?, Sloan School of Management, Massachusetts Institute of Technology, 43 p.
- Giovanni Andreatta, Gordon M. Kaufman (1990), Software Reliability Modeling and Exponential Order Statistics, Sloan School of Management, Massachusetts Institute of Technology, 45 p.
- Eytan Barouch, Gordon M. Kaufman (1976), Oil and Gas Discovery Modelled as Sampling Proportional to Random Size, M.I.T. Alfred P. Sloan School of Management, 63 p.
- Eytan Barouch, Gordon M. Kaufman (1976), On Sums of Lognormal Random Variables, Sloan School of Management, Massachusetts Institute of Technology, 42 p.
- Gordon M. Kaufman (1963), Statistical decision and related techniques in oil and gas exploration. Ford Foundation Doctoral Dissertation Series, Prentice Hall, 307 p.
