= Oxford Today =

Alumni magazine of Oxford University

- Editor: Dr. Richard Lofthouse
- Categories: Alumni
- Frequency: Triannual
- Circulation: c. 150,000
- Founded: 1988
- Final issue: 2017
- Company: Future plc
- Country: United Kingdom
- Based in: Oxford
- Language: English
- Website: www.alumni.ox.ac.uk
- ISSN: 0954-1306

Oxford Today: The University Magazine was a magazine for the alumni of Oxford University.

Oxford Today was a magazine distributed free to around 160,000 alumni around the world. It appeared three times a year, with the issues coinciding with the three Oxford academic terms of Michaelmas, Hilary, and Trinity. The editor was Dr Richard Lofthouse, and it was published by Future plc on behalf of the University of Oxford.

Articles covered subjects such as current affairs, history, literature, as well as the University itself. Contributors and interviewees had included many Oxford alumni from different walks of life, such as the politician Michael Heseltine, the author and playwright Alan Bennett and the comedian Terry Jones of Monty Python fame.

The magazine was previously published by Wiley-Blackwell. In April 2010, it was reported that a new publisher would be taking over the magazine, resulting in the job of then-current editor Greg Neale being placed under review; this caused concern among members of the publication's editorial review board, some of whom expressed the view that the Oxford administration was seeking to reduce the magazine's independence. The magazine was published by FuturePlus, a division of Future Publishing Limited, on behalf of the University of Oxford. After a review of the magazine and its mounting costs, Oxford University decided to close the publication with its last issue published in Trinity 2017.
