= Euny Hong =

Korean-American journalist

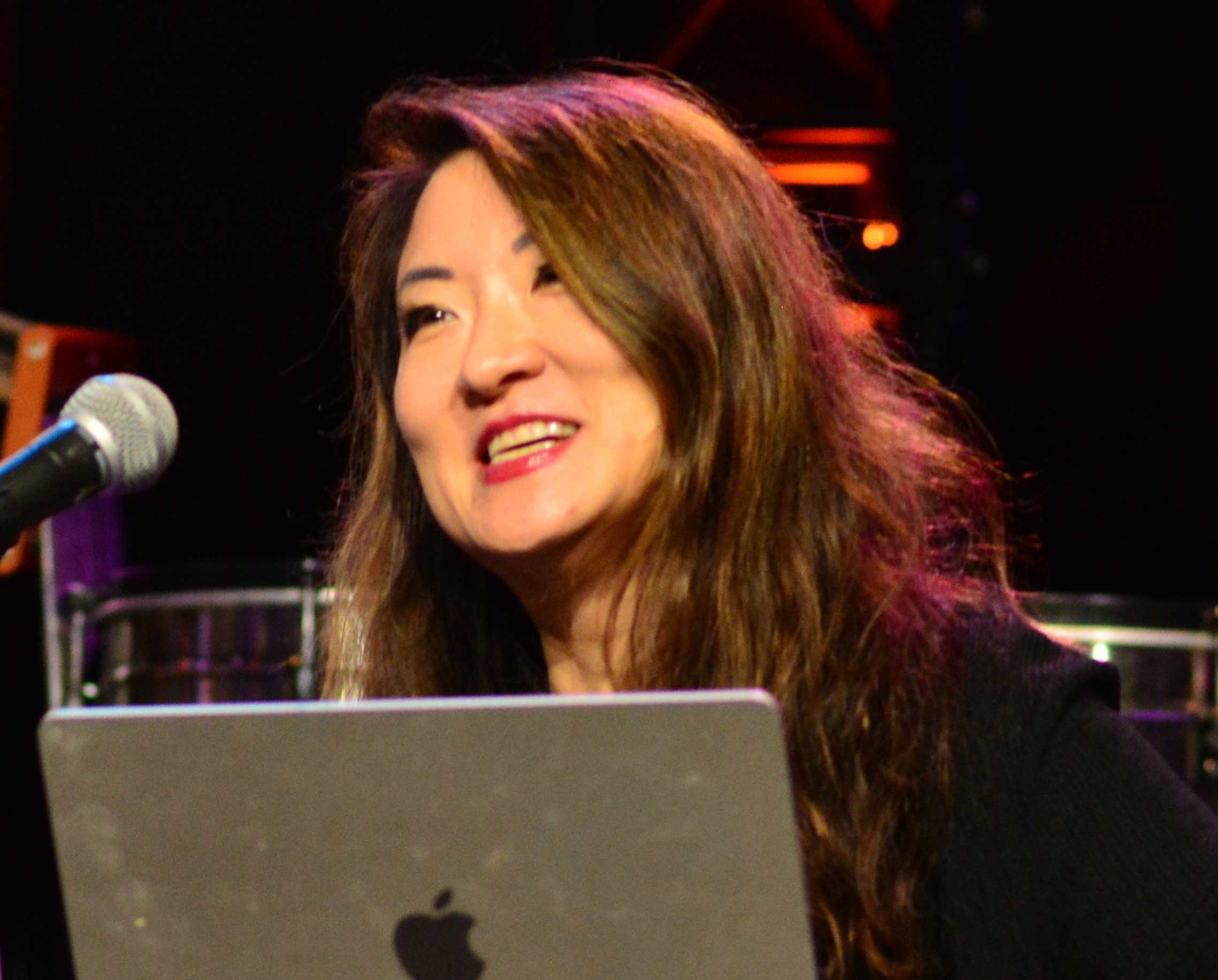
- March 2025
- Born: Youn-Kee Euny Hong; New Jersey, United States
- Education: Yale University

Youn-Kee Euny Hong is an American journalist and author, based in France.

== Biography ==
Hong is a Paris-based author of three books. The novel Kept: A Comedy of Sex and Manners was published by Simon and Schuster in 2006. The Birth of Korean Cool: How One Nation is Conquering the World Through Pop Culture was published by Picador Books in the US/Simon & Schuster in the UK in 2014, and has been published in seven languages. It was named an Amazon Editor's Pick. Her third book, The Power of Nunchi: The Korean Secret to Success and Happiness, was published by Penguin Random House in 2019. Her books have been translated into 18 languages, including French, Dutch, Spanish, Polish, Italian, German, Portuguese (standard and Brazilian), Indonesian, Thai, and Chinese.

Hong was a senior columnist for the U.S. edition of the Financial Times, where she wrote a weekly television column and other articles on culture. She was awarded a Fulbright Beginning Professional Journalism Award. Hong's works have appeared in The New York Times, The Wall Street Journal, The Washington Post, The New Republic, The Daily Beast, The Atlantic, and elsewhere.

Hong was born in New Jersey in the United States. At age 12, she moved to Seoul with her family, and was educated in both the Korean public school system and an international school (Seoul Foreign School). While studying in Korea, she experienced anti-communist indoctrination. After high school, she returned to the U.S. to attend Yale University, from which she graduated with a B.A. in Philosophy. While at Yale, she was co-founder and the first Editor-in-Chief of Rumpus Magazine, an undergraduate humour publication that remains in publication. Hong lives in Paris, France, and was a journalist for France 24, an international news network. She has also lived in Frankfurt and Berlin, Germany. Hong has been diagnosed with type II bipolar disorder, and had been married and divorced twice by the age of 33. She is fluent in English, Korean, French, and German. Hong is a convert to Judaism.

== Selected works ==
=== Articles ===
- Hong, Euny (August 8, 2023). "In Paris, I Get Judged on What I Speak, Not How I Look". The New York Times.
- Hong, Euny (January 3, 2023). "I May Have Started a Rumor About K-Pop, and It May Be Ruining My Life". The New York Times.
- Hong, Euny (21 May 2021). "Americans ruined pizza, St. Patrick's Day and House of Cards. Now they're ruining Eurovision". Politico Europe.
- Hong, Euny (14 April 2020). "Book Review: In This Korean Best Seller, a Young Mother Is Driven to Psychosis". The New York Times.
- Hong, Euny (2 November 2017). "Opinion: I Grew Up Around Korean Beauty Products. Americans, You've Been Had". The New York Times.
- Hong, Euny (15 May 2020). "Why I've Stopped Telling People I'm Not Chinese". The New York Times.
- Hong, Euny (19 December 2019). "Opinion: The Korean Secret to Happiness and Success". The New York Times.
- Hong, Euny (2 November 2017). "Opinion: I Grew Up Around Korean Beauty Products. Americans, You've Been Had". The New York Times.
- Hong, Euny (July 21, 2017). "Unfamous Valley: Why it sucks to be not quite famous". Quartz.
- Hong, Euny (November 13, 2015). ""Resilience in Paris"". The Los Angeles Times.
- Hong, Euny (April 13, 2016). "Conan O'Brien accidentally exposed the culture gap between Koreans and Korean-Americans". Quartz.
- Hong, Euny (May 13, 2016). "Justin Timberlake is going to ruin Eurovision". Quartz.
- Hong, Euny (May 13, 2016). "K-Pop Music and the Hallyu Hullabaloo". The Wall Street Journal.
- "Hong, Euny (November 30, 2003). "Teaching Germany to Grin and Bear Cheerleading". The New York Times.
- Hong, Euny (May 26, 2003). "Rise of the New Europe in Euro Pop". The New York Times.
- Hong, Euny (September 24, 2012). "Growing Up Gangnam-Style: What the Seoul Neighborhood Was Really Like". The Atlantic.
- Hong, Euny (June 27, 2013). "The Crazy, All-Night Goldman Sachs Scavenger Hunt". The Atlantic.
- Hong, Euny (November 30, 2012). "The biggest royal event in France since Versailles: Burger King is coming back". Quartz.
- Hong, Euny (September 24, 2012). "In the Future, Your Champagne Will Come From England". The Atlantic.

=== Books ===
- (Hong, Euny (2019). The Power of Nunchi: The Korean Secret to Happiness and Success. Penguin. ISBN 978-0143134466.
- (Hong, Euny (2014). The Birth of Korean Cool: How One Nation is Conquering the World through Pop Culture. Picador. ISBN 978-1250045119.
- (Hong, Euny (2006). Kept: A Comedy of Sex and Manners. Simon & Schuster. ISBN 978-0743286848.

== See also ==
- Koreans in France
- Koreans in New York City
- New Yorkers in journalism
- Popular culture
