= Yale Alumni Magazine =

Alumni magazine of Yale University

- Categories: Alumni magazine
- Frequency: Bimonthly
- Founded: 1891
- Company: Yale University
- Country: USA
- Based in: New Haven, Connecticut
- Language: English
- Website: yalealumnimagazine.org
- ISSN: 0044-0051

The Yale Alumni Magazine is an alumni magazine about Yale University that was founded in 1891.

== History ==
The magazine was founded in 1891. Hal Boyle praised the magazine in a 1957 column.

In 2006, the magazine published a recently uncovered 1918-letter between two Skull and Bones members talking about Geronimo's skull robbed by their own club, further alleging the club was secretly in possession of that skull. In 2008, the magazine released an investigation seriously questioning Reinhold Niebuhr's authorship of the Serenity Prayer. In 2014, a cover of the magazine that featured the headline "Reaching beyond the low-hanging fruit," with the subhed "Yale College seeks smart students from poor families. They're out there — but hard to find," was widely criticized.

Yale University took over operations of the Yale Alumni Magazine in 2015.

== Activities ==
The editor-in-chief has been Kathrin Day Lassila since July 2015.
