= List of roles and awards of Salma Hayek =

Salma Hayek filmography
- Acting credits: 81
- Producing credits: 9
- Directing credits: 3

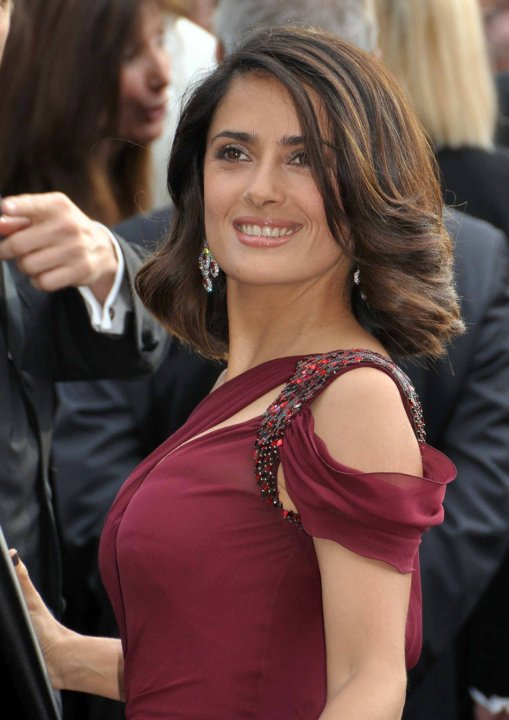
Hayek at the 2010 Cannes Film Festival

Salma Hayek awards and nominations
| Award | Wins | Nominations |
| Academy Awards | 0 | 1 |
| British Academy Film Awards | 0 | 1 |
| Golden Globe Awards | 0 | 1 |
| Emmy Awards | 1 | 4 |
| Producers Guild of America Awards | 1 | 2 |
| ALMA Awards | 2 | 7 |

Salma Hayek is a Mexican American and French actress who made her acting debut in the Mexican television series in Un Nuevo Amanecer (1988–1989), before becoming a household name to Hispanic audiences for her starring role in Teresa, a successful telenovela that aired on Televisa for two years and 125 episodes. After moving to the United States, Hayek initially struggled as an actress. In 1995, however, she found early acclaim for her performance in the drama Midaq Alley (El Callejon de los Milagros) and obtained her Hollywood breakthrough in the action-orientated Desperado, directed by Robert Rodriguez, who would become a frequent collaborator. She soon established herself in Hollywood with roles that relied significantly on her sex appeal in films such as From Dusk till Dawn (1996), Wild Wild West (1999) and Dogma (1999).

Hayek founded her production company, Ventanarosa, in 1999, through which she produces film and television projects. The biographical film Frida (2002) —in which she served as a producer and portrayed painter Frida Kahlo— made her the first Mexican actress to be nominated for the Academy Award for Best Actress and, in addition, earned her Golden Globe Award, Screen Actors Guild Award and British Academy Film Award nominations. She has since starred in a diverse list of films, including Once Upon a Time in Mexico (2003), After the Sunset (2004), Bandidas (2006), Grown Ups (2010), Grown Ups 2 (2013), Tale of Tales (2015), Beatriz at Dinner (2017), The Hitman's Bodyguard (2017), Eternals (2021) and House of Gucci (2021). She has also lent her voice for the animated Puss in Boots (2011), The Pirates! In an Adventure with Scientists! (2012), Kahlil Gibran's The Prophet (2014), Sausage Party (2016) and Puss in Boots: The Last Wish (2022).

Hayek has received seven ALMA Awards nominations and was the recipient of the 2009 Anthony Quinn Award for Achievement in Motion Pictures by the association. Her directing, producing and acting work on television has garnered Hayek four Emmy Award nominations. She won the Daytime Emmy Award for Outstanding Directing in a Children Special for The Maldonado Miracle (2004) and received two Primetime Emmy Award nominations, one for Outstanding Guest Actress in a Comedy Series and the other for Outstanding Comedy Series, for her work on the ABC series Ugly Betty (2006–10). She has also been the recipient of Glamour magazine Woman of the Year Award in 2001, the Producers Guild of America Celebration of Diversity Award in 2003, the Harvard Foundation Artist of the Year Award in 2006, and the Franca Sozzani Award at the Venice Film Festival in 2018. In 2011, Hayek was appointed Knight (Chevalier) of the National Order of the Legion of Honour, the highest French order of merit, and in 2021, she was honored with a star on the Hollywood Walk of Fame.

== Screen credits ==
Key
| † | Denotes films that have not yet been released |

=== Film ===
| Year | Title | Role | Notes | Ref(s). |
|---|---|---|---|---|
| 1993 | My Crazy Life | Gata | | |
| 1995 | Midaq Alley | Alma | | |
| 1995 | Desperado | Carolina | | |
| 1995 | Four Rooms | TV Dancing Girl | | |
| 1995 | Fair Game | Rita | | |
| 1996 | From Dusk till Dawn | Santanico Pandemonium | | |
| 1996 | Follow Me Home | Betty | | |
| 1996 | Fled | Cora | | |
| 1997 | Fools Rush In | Isabel Fuentes-Whitman | | |
| 1997 | Breaking Up | Monica | | |
| 1997 | Sístole Diástole | Carmelita | Short film | |
| 1998 | 54 | Anita Randazzo | | |
| 1998 | The Velocity of Gary | Mary Carmen | | |
| 1998 | Welcome to Hollywood | Herself | | |
| 1998 | The Faculty | Nurse Harper | | |
| 1999 | Dogma | Serendipity | | |
| 1999 | No One Writes to the Colonel | Julia | | |
| 1999 | Wild Wild West | Rita Escobar | | |
| 2000 | Timecode | Rose | | |
| 2000 | Living It Up | Lola | | |
| 2000 | Traffic | Rosario | Uncredited role | |
| 2001 | Chain of Fools | Sergeant Meredith Kolko | | |
| 2001 | Hotel | Charlee Boux | | |
| 2002 | Frida | Frida Kahlo | Also producer | |
| 2003 | Spy Kids 3-D: Game Over | Francesca Giggles | | |
| 2003 | Once Upon a Time in Mexico | Carolina | | |
| 2004 | After the Sunset | Lola Cirillo | | |
| 2006 | Bandidas | Sara Sandoval | | |
| 2006 | Ask the Dust | Camilla Lopez | | |
| 2006 | Lonely Hearts | Martha Jule Beck | | |
| 2007 | Across the Universe | Bang Bang Shoot Shoot Nurses | | |
| 2009 | Cirque du Freak: The Vampire's Assistant | Madame Truska | | |
| 2010 | Grown Ups | Roxanne Chase-Feder | | |
| 2011 | Americano | Lola | | |
| 2011 | Puss in Boots | Kitty Softpaws | Voice role | |
| 2011 | As Luck Would Have It | Luisa Gómez | | |
| 2012 | The Pirates! In an Adventure with Scientists! | Cutlass Lizz | Voice role | |
| 2012 | Savages | Elena "La Reina" Sánchez | | |
| 2012 | Here Comes the Boom | Bella Flores | | |
| 2013 | Grown Ups 2 | Roxanne Chase-Feder | | |
| 2014 | Muppets Most Wanted | Herself | Cameo appearance | |
| 2014 | Kahlil Gibran's The Prophet | Kamilla | Voice role; also producer | |
| 2014 | Everly | Everly | | |
| 2014 | Some Kind of Beautiful | Olivia | | |
| 2015 | Tale of Tales | Queen of Longtrellis | | |
| 2015 | Septembers of Shiraz | Farnez Amin | Also executive producer | |
| 2016 | I Saved My Belly Dancer | The Dancer | Short film | |
| 2016 | Sausage Party | Theresa del Taco | Voice role | |
| 2017 | Beatriz at Dinner | Beatriz Blanco | | |
| 2017 | How to Be a Latin Lover | Sara | | |
| 2017 | 11th Hour | Maria José | Short film | |
| 2017 | The Hitman's Bodyguard | Sonia Kincaid | | |
| 2018 | The Hummingbird Project | Eva Torres | | |
| 2019 | Drunk Parents | Nancy Teagarten | | |
| 2020 | Like a Boss | Claire Luna | | |
| 2020 | The Roads Not Taken | Dolores | | |
| 2021 | Bliss | Isabel Clemens | | |
| 2021 | Hitman's Wife's Bodyguard | Sonia Kincaid | | |
| 2021 | Eternals | Ajak | | |
| 2021 | House of Gucci | Giuseppina "Pina" Auriemma | | |
| 2022 | Puss in Boots: The Last Wish | Kitty Softpaws | Voice role | |
| 2023 | Magic Mike's Last Dance | Maxandra Mendoza | | |
| 2024 | Without Blood | Nina | | |
| 2025 | Sacrifice | Mrs. Braken | | |
| TBA | Grown Ups 3 | Roxanne Chase-Feder | Filming | |
| TBA | Arena † | —N/a | Filming; director and writer | |

=== Television films ===
| Year | Title | Role | Notes |
|---|---|---|---|
| 1994 | Roadracers | Donna | |
| 1997 | The Hunchback | Esmeralda | |
| 2001 | In the Time of the butterflies | Minerva Mirabal | Also executive producer |

=== Television ===
| Year | Title | Role | Notes |
|---|---|---|---|
| 1988-1989 | Nuevo Amanecer | Fabiola Ramírez-Anthony | Main role |
| 1989-1990 | Teresa | Teresa Martínez | Main role |
| 1992 | Street Justice | Andrea | Episode: "Homecoming" |
| 1992 | Dream On | Carmela | Episode: "Domestic Bliss" |
| 1992 | Nurses | Yolanda Cuevas | Episode: "One Pequeno, Two Pequeno" |
| 1993 | Jack's Place | Gypsy Katrina 'Kata' Nicklos | Episode: "Gypsies, Champs and Thieves" |
| 1993 | The Sinbad Show | Gabriela Contreras | Recurring role; 3 episodes |
| 1994 | El vuelo del águila | Juana Catalina Romero | Episode: "Episode #1.1" |
| 1997 | Gente Bien | Teresa | Episode: "Episode #1.1" |
| 1999 | Actiona | Herself | Episode: "Re-Enter the Dragon" |
| 1999 | HBO First Look | Herself | Episode: "It's a Whole New West: The Making of 'Wild, Wild West'" |
| 2003 | Saturday Night Live | Herself | Episode: "Salma Hayek / Christina Aguilera" |
| 2004 | Independent Lens | Herself | Episode: "Los Angeles Now" |
| 2005 | Punk'd | Herself | Episode: "Episode #4.1" |
| 2005 | Nobel Peace Prize Concert | Herself | Main Co-Host |
| 2006 | Will & Grace | Herself | Episode: "Buy, Buy Baby" |
| 2006–2007 | Ugly Betty | Sofia Reyes | Recurring role; 8 episodes (season 1); Also executive producer |
| 2007 | E! True Hollywood Story | Herself | Episode: "Vanessa Williams" |
| 2008 | Wetten, dass..? | Herself | Episode: "Wetten, dass..? aus Nürnberg" |
| 2009, 2013 | 30 Rock | Elisa Pedrera | Recurring role; 6 episodes (season 3); Special guest star; Episode: "Hagcock!/Last Lunch" |
| 2010 | Cubed | Herself | Episode: "Episode #1.41" |
| 2014 | Bystander Revolution | Herself | Recurring guest; 9 episodes |
| 2017 | Nature Is Speaking | Mother Nature | Voice role; Episode: "Madre Naturaleza" |
| 2023 | Black Mirror | Herself as Joan | Episode: "Joan Is Awful" |

=== Documentary ===
| Year | Title |
|---|---|
| 1997 | ¿Quién diablos es Juliette? |
| 1999 | Get Bruce! |
| 2002 | Playboy: Inside the Playboy Mansion |
| 2002 | Searching for Debra Winger |
| 2003 | V-Day: Until the Violence Stops |
| 2004 | Stupidity |
| 2004 | Los Angeles Now |
| 2007 | Marc Jacobs & Louis Vuitton |
| 2011 | The Love We Make |
| 2013 | Girl Rising |
| 2014 | Ferite a morte |
| 2014 | Journey to Sundance |
| 2016 | No Retakes! No Surrender! |

=== Music videos ===
| Year | Artist | Song | Notes | Ref. |
|---|---|---|---|---|
| 1995 | Better Than Ezra | "Rosealia" | Lead | |
| 1999 | Will Smith featuring Dru Hill and Kool Moe Dee | "Wild Wild West" | Rita Escobar | |
| 2005 | Prince | "Te Amo Corazón" | Director | |
| 2011 | "Nada Se Compara" | "Nada Se Compara" | Director | |

== Awards and nominations ==
| Year (Note: Refers to the year in which the ceremony was held) | Association | Category | Film | Result | Ref. |
|---|---|---|---|---|---|
| 1989 | TVyNovelas Awards | Best Debut Actress | Un Nuevo Amanecer | Won | |
| 1990 | TVyNovelas Awards | Best Revelation | Teresa | Won | |
| 1996 | Ariel Awards | Best Actress | El Callejon de los Milagros | Nominated | |
| 1996 | Mexican Cinema Journalists | Best Newcomer | El Callejon de los Milagros | Won | |
| 1996 | Saturn Awards | Best Supporting Actress | Desperado | Nominated | |
| 1996 | MTV Movie Awards | Best Kiss (shared with Antonio Banderas) | Desperado | Nominated | |
| 1998 | ALMA Awards | Outstanding Actress in a Feature Film | Fools Rush In | Nominated | |
| 1998 | ALMA Awards | Outstanding Individual Performance in a Made for Television Movie | The Hunchback | Nominated | |
| 1999 | ALMA Awards | Outstanding Actress in a Feature Film | 54 | Nominated | |
| 2000 | ALMA Awards | Outstanding Actress in a Feature Film | Wild Wild West | Nominated | |
| 2000 | Blockbuster Entertainment Awards | Favorite Supporting Actress – Action | Wild Wild West | Won | |
| 2000 | Razzie Awards | Worst Supporting Actress | Nominated | | |
| 2000 | Razzie Awards | Worst Supporting Actress | Dogma | Nominated | |
| 2001 | Glamour | Woman of the Year Award | —N/a | Won | |
| 2002 | ALMA Awards | Outstanding Individual Performance in a Made for Television Movie | In the Time of the Butterflies | Won | |
| 2002 | Critic's Choice Awards | Best Actress in a Picture Made for Television or Miniseries | In the Time of the Butterflies | Nominated | |
| 2003 | Goldene Kamera | Best International Actress | Frida | Won | |
| 2003 | Imagen Awards | Best Actress – Film | Frida | Won | |
| 2003 | Academy Awards | Best Actress | Frida | Nominated | |
| 2003 | BAFTA Awards | Best Actress | Frida | Nominated | |
| 2003 | Boston Society of Film Critics | Best Actress | Frida | Nominated | |
| 2003 | Chicago Film Critics Association | Best Actress | Frida | Nominated | |
| 2003 | Golden Globe Awards | Best Actress in a Motion Picture – Drama | Frida | Nominated | |
| 2003 | Satellite Awards | Best Actress – Motion Picture | Frida | Nominated | |
| 2003 | Screen Actors Guild Awards | Outstanding Performance by a Female Actor in a Leading Role | Frida | Nominated | |
| 2003 | Producers Guild of America | Celebration of Diversity Award | —N/a | Won | |
| 2004 | Daytime Emmy Awards | Outstanding Directing in a Children/Youth/Family Special | The Maldonado Miracle | Won | |
| 2004 | Daytime Emmy Awards | Outstanding Children/Youth/Family Special | The Maldonado Miracle | Nominated | |
| 2006 | Harvard Foundation | Harvard Foundation Artist of the Year Award | —N/a | Won | |
| 2007 | San Sebastián International Film Festival | Best Actress | Lonely Hearts | Nominated | |
| 2007 | Primetime Emmy Awards | Outstanding Guest Actress in a Comedy Series | Ugly Betty | Nominated | |
| 2007 | Primetime Emmy Awards | Outstanding Comedy Series | Ugly Betty | Nominated | |
| 2007 | Producers Guild of America Awards | Best Episodic Comedy | Ugly Betty | Nominated | |
| 2009 | ALMA Awards | Anthony Quinn Award for Achievement in Motion Pictures | —N/a | Won | |
| 2009 | ALMA Awards | Actress in Television – Comedy | 30 Rock | Nominated | |
| 2009 | Online Film & Television Association | Best Guest Actress in a Comedy Series | 30 Rock | Nominated | |
| 2012 | Teen Choice Awards | Choice Movie Actress – Action | Puss in Boots | Nominated | |
| 2012 | Alliance of Women Film Journalists | Best Animated Female | Puss in Boots | Nominated | |
| 2012 | Behind the Voice Actors Awards | Best Female Vocal Performance in a Feature Film | Puss in Boots | Nominated | |
| 2012 | Behind the Voice Actors Awards | Best Vocal Ensemble in a Feature Film | Puss in Boots | Nominated | |
| 2012 | Bambi Awards | Best International Actress | —N/a | Won | |
| 2012 | San Sebastián International Film Festival | Best Actress | Americano | Nominated | |
| 2012 | Goya Awards | Best Actress | La chispa de la vida | Nominated | |
| 2013 | Behind the Voice Actors Awards | Best Vocal Ensemble in a Feature Film | The Pirates! | Nominated | |
| 2013 | MTV Movie Awards | Best Latino Actor | Savages | Nominated | |
| 2013 | ALMA Awards | Favorite Movie Actress – Drama | Savages | Nominated | |
| 2014 | Golden Raspberry Awards | Worst Supporting Actress | Grown Ups 2 | Nominated | |
| 2017 | CinemaCon | Vanguard Award | —N/a | Nominated | |
| 2018 | Independent Spirit Award | Best Female Lead | Beatriz at Dinner | Nominated | |
| 2018 | AARP Movies for Grownups Awards | Best Actress | Beatriz at Dinner | Nominated | |
| 2018 | Venice Film Festival | Franca Sozzani Award | —N/a | Won | |
| 2021 | Cannes Film Festival | Kering Women in Motion Award | —N/a | Won | |
| 2022 | Alliance of Women Film Journalists | Most Egregious Lovers' Age Difference Award (shared with Samuel L. Jackson) | Hitman's Wife Bodyguard | Nominated | |
| 2022 | Screen Actors Guild Awards | Outstanding Performance by a Cast in a Motion Picture | House of Gucci | Nominated | |
| 2022 | IMDb | Icon STARmeter Award | Career Achievement | Awarded | |
| 2023 | Nickelodeon Kids' Choice Awards | Favorite Female Voice from an Animated Movie | Puss in Boots: The Last Wish | Nominated | |
| 2024 | Golden Raspberry Awards | Worst Actress | Magic Mike's Last Dance | Nominated | |
| 2026 | Women in Film Honors | Jane Fonda Humanitarian Award | For her advocacy for the rights of women, children and immigrants. | Honoured | |
