= Jeff Harms =

American musician and actor

- Education: School of the Art Institute of Chicago (MFA)
- Occupations: Musician; actor
- Website: jeffharmsactor.com

Jeff Harms is an American musician and actor from Arlington Heights, Illinois. In the music world he is known for his song-writing and solo performances, occasionally accompanied by the likes of Leroy Bach, Emmett Kelly, Sam Wagster, Dan Mohr, Gillian Lisée. Benjamin Boye, Rachel Ries, and Nora O'Connor among many others. As an actor and performer he is known for his collaboration with long-time collaborator and playwright Brian Torrey Scott.

== Career ==
=== Music ===
Jeff's first album was made in 2002 during a workshop at The School of the Art Institute of Chicago run by the performance group Goat Island. Spencer Matern and Emily Evans developed some of the songs further at ESS in Chicago and released the album on their label Naivete Records in 2004 as Big Amazing Songs. After graduating from SAIC Jeff toured the US opening for Jason Webley. Since he has released three more records. The Myth of Heroics, was produced by Emmett Kelly in 2008, He Said She Said That's What She Said, produced by LeRoy Bach in 2012 and Pretty Girls Don't Just Talk to Me in 2013, produced by Sam Wagster. In all three cases, these producers both produced and played extensively on the records. Pretty Girls is an album of duets also featuring singers Gillian Lisée, Rachel Ries, Nora O'Connor, Dan Mohr, and Angela James. In 2015 he provided rhythm guitar and backing vocals for The Cairo Gang's tour of the US and Canada. His music appears in the movie Elephant Medicine by Julian Wayser.

=== Performance ===
Jeff received his MFA from The School of the Art Institute of Chicago in 2004 with a focus on performance art and sculpture. There he met writer-director Brian Torrey Scott and began a decade long friendship making experimental theater and video in Chicago. Brian directed and occasionally played opposite Jeff in over a dozen plays and movies. In 2008 Brian joined the group Every House Has a Door and in 2009 Jeff took his place in the role of Benny Goodman for Every House's production They're Mending the Forest Highway. Jeff was in the company for two years.

In 2007 Jeff produced and starred in A Thing as Big as the Ocean, written and directed by Joseph Cashiola, shot by Daniel Mejia. The film was invited to the IFP Narrative Film Lab and won the Narrative Lab Finishing Grant of $50,000. It premiered at the Woods Hole Film Festival the following year.

Brian Torrey Scott and Jeff made three films together, The Objects of Living, Isthmus and Ganzfeld. Objects was shot at the Catwalk Artist Residency in upstate New York. Ganzfeld was shot in the mountains of Montana and in Chicago in a year long collaboration with Scott and long-time friend and cameraman Daniel Mejia. Ganzfeld features an original soundtrack of songs written by LeRoy Bach performed by Azita Youssefi and Marvin Tate. The song that plays over the credits was written by Harms and arranged by Bach. Ganzfeld was produced by Michael Gilio and Kwik Stop Productions.

Jeff plays Ben Hecht in David Fincher's Mank. He starred in The Rise and Fall of the Brown Buffalo for PBS as Hunter S. Thompson, as well as music videos for Billy Idol, Metallica, Coheed and Cambria, and Death From Above 1979. Jeff also has small roles in Elephant Medicine, directed by Julian Wayser and Oh My Soul, directed by Nicholas Monsour. He also created an ongoing animated series about dating called Jeff Hobbs the Cartoon.

== Personal life ==
Jeff currently lives and works in Los Angeles, California.

== Discography ==
- Big Amazing Songs (Naivete Records, 2004)
- The Myth of Heroics (The Disneyland Reform Party, 2008)
- He Said She Said That's What She Said (2015)
- Pretty Girls Don't Just Talk to Me (2015)

== Filmography ==
- Pitch and Tone (2007)
- The Objects of Living (2008)
- A Thing as Big as the Ocean (2009)
- Isthmus (tbd)
- Ganzfeld (2011)
- The Rise and Fall of the Brown Buffalo (2018)
- Mank (2020)
- V/H/S/Halloween (2025)
