= The Rise and Fall of the Brown Buffalo =

- Directed by: Phillip Rodriguez
- Written by: Phillip Rodriguez David Ventura
- Produced by: Benicio Del Toro (executive producer) Alison Sotomayor
- Cinematography: Claudio Rocha
- Edited by: Claudio Rocha
- Music by: Alejandro Cohen Aaron Drake
- Production company: City Projects
- Release date: September 2017 (San Francisco Latino Film Festival)
- Running time: 56 minutes
- Country: US
- Language: English

The Rise and Fall of the Brown Buffalo is a 2017 American documentary film directed by Phillip Rodriguez, and written by Phillip Rodriguez, and David Ventura.

== Plot summary ==
The film documents the life and career of Oscar Zeta Acosta, an American attorney, politician, novelist, and Chicano Movement activist who was fictionalized as Dr. Gonzo in Hunter S. Thompson's Fear and Loathing in Las Vegas. The documentary was developed and directed by Phillip Rodriguez over many years and consists of stills and film footage interspersed with dramatic reenactments. It is based in part on Acosta's autobiography with the similar title, Autobiography of a Brown Buffalo.

== Cast ==
- Jesse Celedon as Oscar Zeta Acosta
- Jeff Harms as Hunter S. Thompson
- Steve Ledesma as young Oscar Zeta Acosta

== Streaming ==
The film is available online through pbs.org and Kanopy
