= Phillip Rodriguez =

American documentary filmmaker

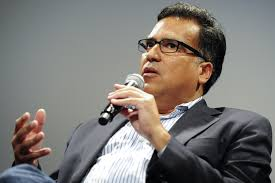
Filmmaker Phillip Rodriguez at a screening of Ruben Salazar: Man in the Middle.

Phillip Rodriguez is an American documentary filmmaker and veteran content provider for PBS.

In 2002, Rodriguez founded City Projects, a production company whose films and educational programs challenge ideas about race and diversity in America. Rodriguez' documentary films bring to light the complexities of Latino culture, history, and identity at a time when our nation’s demographics reflect unprecedented growth in the Latino community and the concomitant demand for relevant storytelling.

Ruben Salazar: Man in the Middle, RACE 2012, Latinos ’08, Brown is the New Green: George Lopez and the American Dream, Los Angeles Now, Mixed Feelings: San Diego/Tijuana, Manuel Ocampo: God is My Copilot, and Pancho Villa & Other Stories.

Ruben Salazar: Man in the Middle won Best Documentary at the 2014 San Antonio CineFestival and 2014 Denver XicanIndie Festival. RACE 2012: A Conversation About Race and Politics in America was awarded a 2013 CINE Golden Eagle Award in the Best Televised News Division – Informational/Current Issue category. Latinos ’08 received a 2009 CINE Golden Eagle Award for Best News Analysis. Brown is the New Green: George Lopez and the American Dream was awarded the 2008 Imagen Award for Best TV Documentary.

A graduate of U.C. Berkeley, Rodriguez has an M.A. in Latin American Studies (Honors) and an M.F.A. in Film and Television from UCLA. He also studied Art History and Spanish Literature at Universidad Cumplutense de Madrid. He is a former Senior Research Fellow for The Center for the Study of Los Angeles at Loyola Marymount University and Senior Fellow at the Institute for Justice & Journalism at USC. In 2006, Rodriguez received the first annual USA Broad Fellow Award. This annual award, made by United States Artists (USA), honors the country's finest living artists. Currently, he is Senior Fellow at the USC Annenberg School for Communication and Journalism.

Not limited to film, Rodriguez wrote the story and title song for the Grammy-nominated "Papa's Dream" by Los Lobos. He also founded, published, and edited Avance, a national Latino magazine of arts and culture as well as Esencia, a San Francisco Latino magazine of arts and culture.

The Washington Post has referred to Rodriguez’ work as “higher truth-telling,” The San Diego Tribune calls his work “masterful,” and The New York Times "thoughtful."

== Current Project ==
Rodriguez' current project is about Oscar Zeta Acosta, a brilliant and controversial writer/lawyer/activist who is often remembered in popular culture for his fictionalized appearance as Dr. Gonzo in Hunter S. Thompson’s classic, Fear and Loathing in Las Vegas, as well as for his cult classic books, The Revolt of the Cockroach People and The Autobiography of a Brown Buffalo. It was released in 2017 as The Rise and Fall of the Brown Buffalo

== Filmography ==
Ruben Salazar: Man in the Middle, (2014) an investigative look at the life and mysterious death of pioneering journalist Ruben Salazar. Winner of Best Documentary at the 2014 San Antonio CineFestival.

RACE 2012, (PBS, 2012), a one-hour PBS election special, is a conversation about race, politics, and how demographic change will affect the country's political future. Fast-moving and non-partisan, RACE 2012 draws insights on racial political history from analysts, strategists and activists on both sides of the aisle. Winner of a 2013 CINE Golden Eagle Award.

Latinos '08 (PBS, 2008), a one-hour PBS election special, looks at these new Americans through the prism of the 2008 presidential election, exploring how Latinos will impact not just the 2008 election but also American politics for decades to come. Winner of a 2009 CINE Golden Eagle Award.

Encounter: USA Fellows (United States Artists, 2008), a series of short webisodes documenting leading U.S. artists and their work, in collaboration with United States Artists.

Brown is the New Green: George Lopez and the American Dream (PBS, 2007), a one-hour documentary for PBS, is a look at how Hispanic marketing and media shape Latino identity, featuring George Lopez, an advocate for moving Latinos into the mainstream. Brown is the New Green won a 2008 Imagen award for Best Documentary.

Los Angeles Now (PBS, Independent Lens, 2004), a one-hour documentary, investigates the "browning" of America's second-largest city. Newsday said that the film, "reveals L.A. for what it really is: the most multicultural city in the world and, possibly, a blueprint for the future of the United States.”

Mixed Feelings: San Diego/Tijuana (PBS, 2002), a half-hour documentary, is a commentary on contrasting conditions and attitudes of the U.S. and Mexico using the urban landscapes of neighboring border cities. The New York Times praised the film's "snappy digital imagery;" The Los Angeles Times called it "transnational fun, with a point."

Pancho Villa & Other Stories (PBS, 1999) is a look at popular opinion about one of Mexico's most revered and controversial 20th century personalities. The film was featured at the 2000 San Antonio CineFestival.

Manuel Ocampo: God is My Copilot (Film, 1998) an exploration of identity politics in the contemporary art world, featuring Manuel Ocampo, Dennis Hopper, and Julian Schnabel. Screened in 1998 at the American Film Institute International Festival, Los Angeles; Hawaii International Film Festival; and the Biennale Internationale du film sur l'art at the Centre Georges Pompidou in Paris.
