= George Lopez =

American comedian, actor (born 1961)

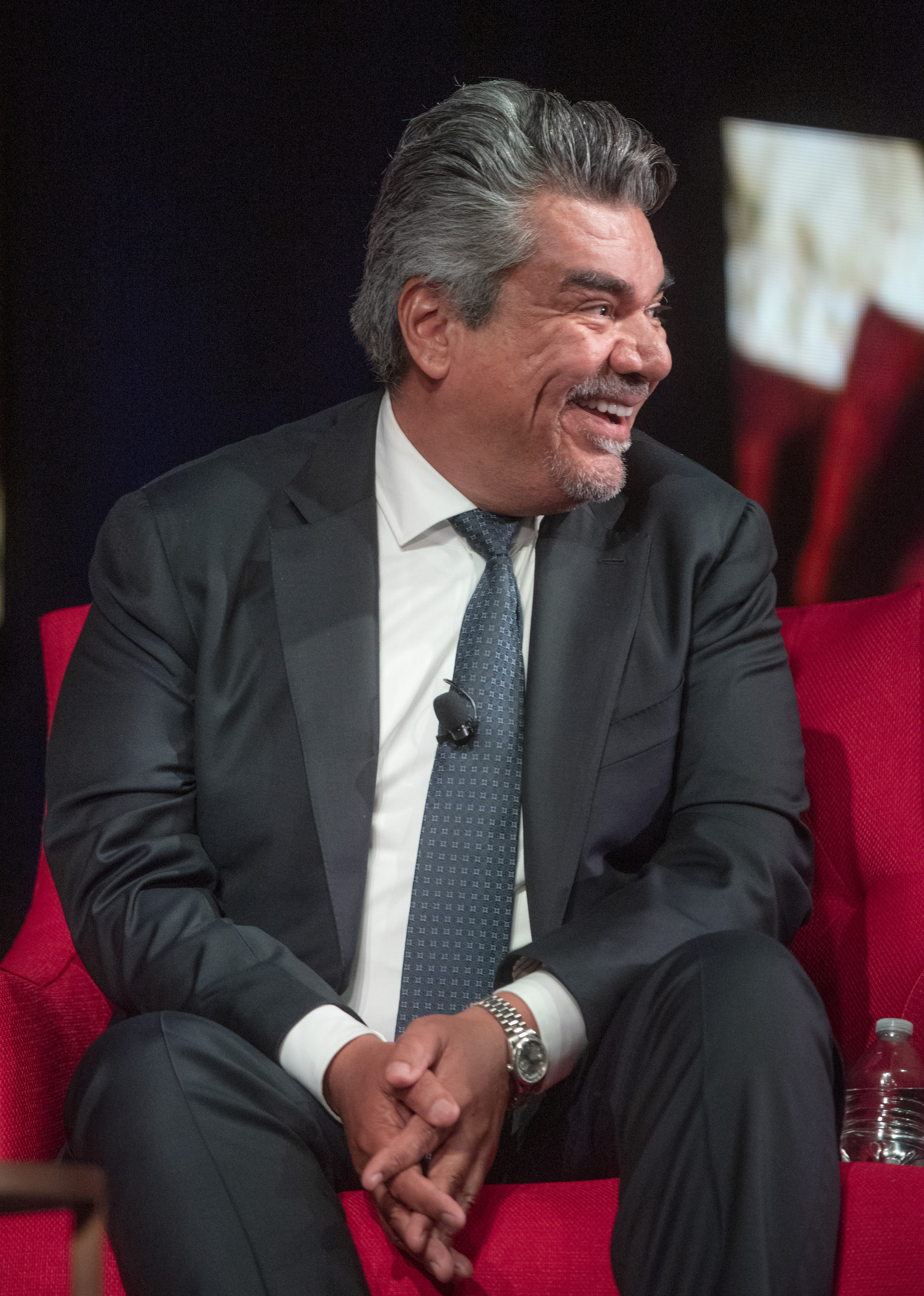
- Lopez in 2019
- Born: George Edward Lopez; April 23, 1961 (age 65); Los Angeles, California, U.S.
- Spouse: Ann Serrano (m. 1993; div. 2011)
- Children: 1

Comedy career
- Years active: 1983–present
- Medium: Stand-up; film; television
- Genres: Observational comedy; black comedy; insult comedy; physical comedy; racial humor; satire
- Subjects: Latin American culture; American politics; race relations; racism; family; everyday life; pop culture; current events
- Website: www.georgelopez.com

George Edward Lopez (born April 23, 1961) is an American stand-up comedian and actor most known for starring in his eponymous ABC sitcom George Lopez from 2002 to 2007. His stand-up comedy examines race and ethnic relations, including Mexican-American culture. Lopez has received several honors for his work and contributions to the Latino community, including the 2003 Imagen Vision Award, the 2003 Latino Spirit Award for Excellence in Television and the National Hispanic Media Coalition Impact Award. He was also named one of the "25 Most Influential Hispanics in America" by Time magazine in 2005.

== Early life ==
Lopez was born on April 23, 1961 in Los Angeles, to Frieda and Anatasio Lopez, a Mexican migrant worker. He grew up in an impoverished, unstable, Catholic household. He was abandoned by his father when he was two months old and by his mother when he was 10 years old. His mother was a deeply troubled woman who attempted suicide and was sent to a psychiatric hospital when Lopez was a child. She was illiterate, unable to write her own name, and suffered from epilepsy since her childhood. Lopez described her as "a scammer" and "a party girl [with] no parental instincts." He has two half-sisters from his mother's relationship with a man 40 years her senior.

Lopez was raised by his maternal grandmother, Benita Gutierrez, a factory worker who was herself abandoned by her mother, and his step-grandfather, Refugio Gutierrez, a day laborer and alcoholic who physically abused Lopez and his grandmother. His grandmother was cold, cruel, and unsympathetic towards Lopez.

Lopez attended San Fernando High School, graduating in 1979.

== Career ==
=== Television ===
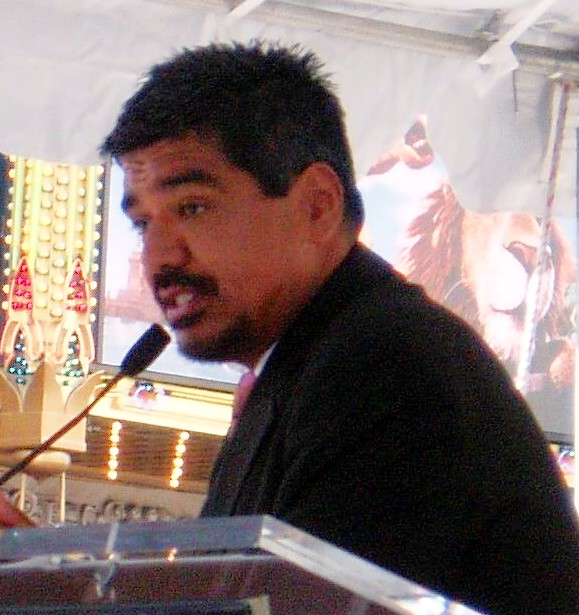
Lopez at his Walk of Fame star dedication ceremony, March 29, 2006

In 2000, after several years of performing stand-up comedy, Lopez was approached by actress Sandra Bullock, who wanted to produce a comedic television show for Lopez. Bullock was concerned about the lack of Hispanic-oriented sitcoms on American television, and pushed to get a sitcom on network television that starred Hispanics without being exclusively about the Hispanic American community. Long criticized by Hispanic American groups for lack of Latinos on their television programs, ABC quickly picked up the television series. In 2002, Lopez became one of the few Latinos to star in a television series, following in the footsteps of Desi Arnaz, Freddie Prinze, and John Leguizamo.

On March 8, 2007, it was announced that George Lopez would join the Nick at Nite lineup. It first aired on Nick at Nite on September 10, 2007. On May 15, 2007, ABC announced that the series would be canceled after its sixth season. The show last aired on ABC September 7, 2007. The show also entered syndication in the fall of 2007. Never a big Nielsen hit in prime-time, the show became a surprise success in syndication.

After receiving the news that his show was canceled in 2007, Lopez criticized the president of ABC Entertainment, Steve McPherson, for using racially motivated reasons for his decision. He told the Los Angeles Times that "TV just became really, really white again", and lashed out against ABC by saying, "So a chicano can't be on TV, but a caveman can?" in reference to the short-lived sitcom Cavemen, which replaced George Lopez on the schedule; he further blamed the network for causing over one hundred members of his show's staff to become jobless.Cavemen garnered a sharply negative reception from critics and viewers, and was canceled after 13 episodes.

Lopez was a cast member and commentator for HBO's hit sports show Inside the NFL for the 2003–04 football season.

Lopez guest-starred as the mayor of Reno, Nevada, in season five of Reno 911! in 2008.

On March 28, 2009, it was announced that Lopez would be hosting his own late-night talk show on TBS entitled Lopez Tonight, Monday through Thursday at midnight Eastern Time.

The show debuted in November 2009. In November 2010, the show moved back to midnight ET to accommodate a new show with former Tonight Show host Conan O'Brien. Although O'Brien had reservations about the move and initially refused TBS's offer, Lopez supported and even advocated for it, making it different from the 2010 Tonight Show conflict that saw O'Brien depart NBC after a proposal to push Tonight back 30 minutes for Jay Leno to return to the 11:35 p.m. slot. On August 10, 2011, Lopez received a cancellation notice from TBS. The network decided not to renew Lopez Tonight for a third season.

On April 18, 2013, it was announced that Lopez would be starring in his own sitcom on FX called Saint George, which premiered on March 6, 2014. Saint George was produced under Debmar-Mercury and Lionsgate Television's syndication model, which states that if a show hits certain ratings thresholds in its first 10-episode run, it triggers an additional 90-episode order. Failing to do so, Saint George was canceled on June 25, 2014, after one season.

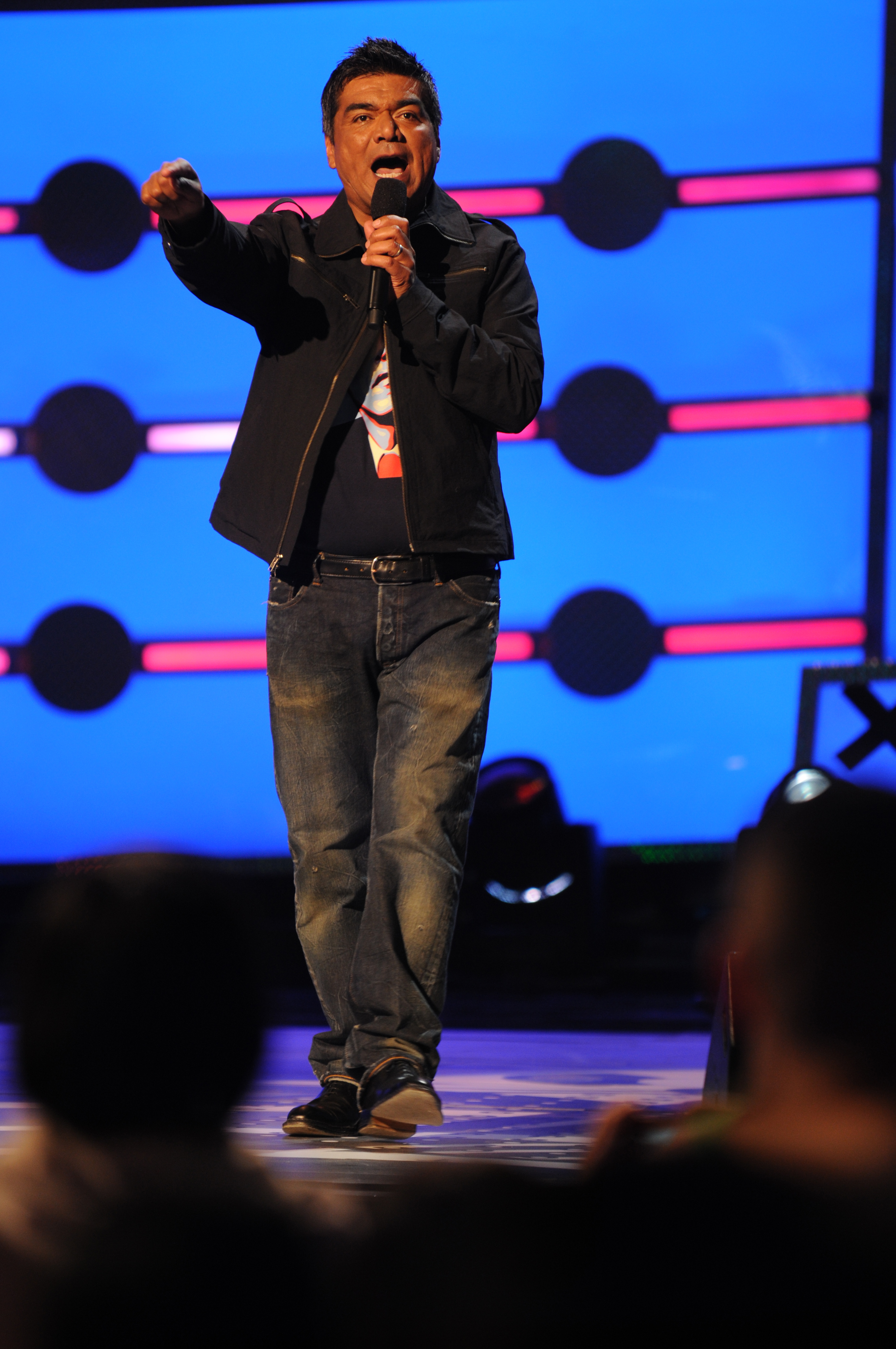
Lopez at the "Kids Inaugural: We Are the Future" concert in 2009

In August 2015, TV Land announced a straight-to-series order for Lopez, a semi-autobiographical single-camera sitcom, which debuted on March 30, 2016.

Lopez was invited to be a guest judge on America's Got Talent in 2016. He was allowed to use his golden buzzer once, which made an act go straight to the live shows. He used his on the dance group Malevo.

In May 2022, NBC picked up Lopez's new series, Lopez vs Lopez, where he co-stars opposite his daughter, Mayan. The series was canceled in May 2025, after three seasons.

=== Film ===
Lopez's HBO Films drama Real Women Have Curves premiered at the Sundance Film Festival, where it received the 2002 Audience Award. Previously, Lopez was featured in the 2000 drama Bread and Roses. He starred in the ABC Wonderful World of Disney Christmas film Naughty or Nice, and he appeared in the Robert Rodriguez-directed film The Adventures of Sharkboy and Lavagirl in 3-D (2005).

Brown Is the New Green: George Lopez and the American Dream is a 2007 documentary directed and produced by Phillip Rodriguez.

In 2008, Lopez voiced Papi Cortez (a Chihuahua) in Disney's Beverly Hills Chihuahua. In 2010, Lopez appeared in The Spy Next Door with Jackie Chan, starring as a villain named Glaze. The following year Lopez reprised his role as Papi for Beverly Hills Chihuahua 2, and was the voice of a toco toucan, Rafael, in the animated box-office hit Rio, alongside Jesse Eisenberg, Anne Hathaway, will.i.am, and Jamie Foxx. In 2019, he played the role of Captain Gomez in the independent film El Chicano.

In 2023, Lopez starred as Rudy Reyes, uncle of Jaime Reyes / Blue Beetle, in the DC Extended Universe superhero film Blue Beetle. He will next star in The Underdoggs, scheduled for release in 2024.

=== Books ===
Lopez's autobiography Why You Crying was published by the Touchstone/Fireside division of Simon & Schuster, and placed in The New York Times bestsellers top twenty. The book is co-written by Armen Keteyian.

=== Other work ===
In January 2009, Lopez appeared in We Are One: The Obama Inaugural Celebration at the Lincoln Memorial.

In 2011, Lopez was hired by Carnival Cruises as the cruise line’s creative director for comedy. The cruiseline introduced the Punchliner Comedy Clubs Presented by George Lopez on their ships. Lopez was a consultant on the vetting and hiring of comedic talent for the line’s existing fleet-wide comedy clubs. This relationship lasted 5 years ending in 2016.

He is a two-time host of the Latin Grammy Awards, and a co-host of the Emmy Awards.

== Personal life ==
In 1993, Lopez married Ann Serrano; they have one daughter together. On September 27, 2010, Lopez announced that he and his wife had decided to end their marriage. Serrano filed for divorce on November 23, 2010, citing irreconcilable differences. The divorce was finalized on July 1, 2011.

Lopez has a genetic condition that caused his kidneys to deteriorate. His doctors had told him in April 2004 that he was going to require an organ transplant but he postponed the operation until finishing the fourth season of George Lopez. In 2005, his wife Ann donated one of her kidneys to Lopez. The transplant was successful; Lopez lost 45 lb (20 kg) after the operation, partly because of the improvement in his health. He brought awareness to the issue on his show; his character's father Manny was diagnosed with a similar illness.

Lopez is a supporter of the Democratic Party and endorsed Senator Bernie Sanders for President in the 2016 U.S. presidential election.

In October 2023, he signed an open letter supporting Israel during the Gaza war.

Lopez resides in Los Feliz, Los Angeles.

Though he was raised Catholic, he is not religious, saying: "My religion is helping people and not carrying anger."

=== Charity work and honors ===
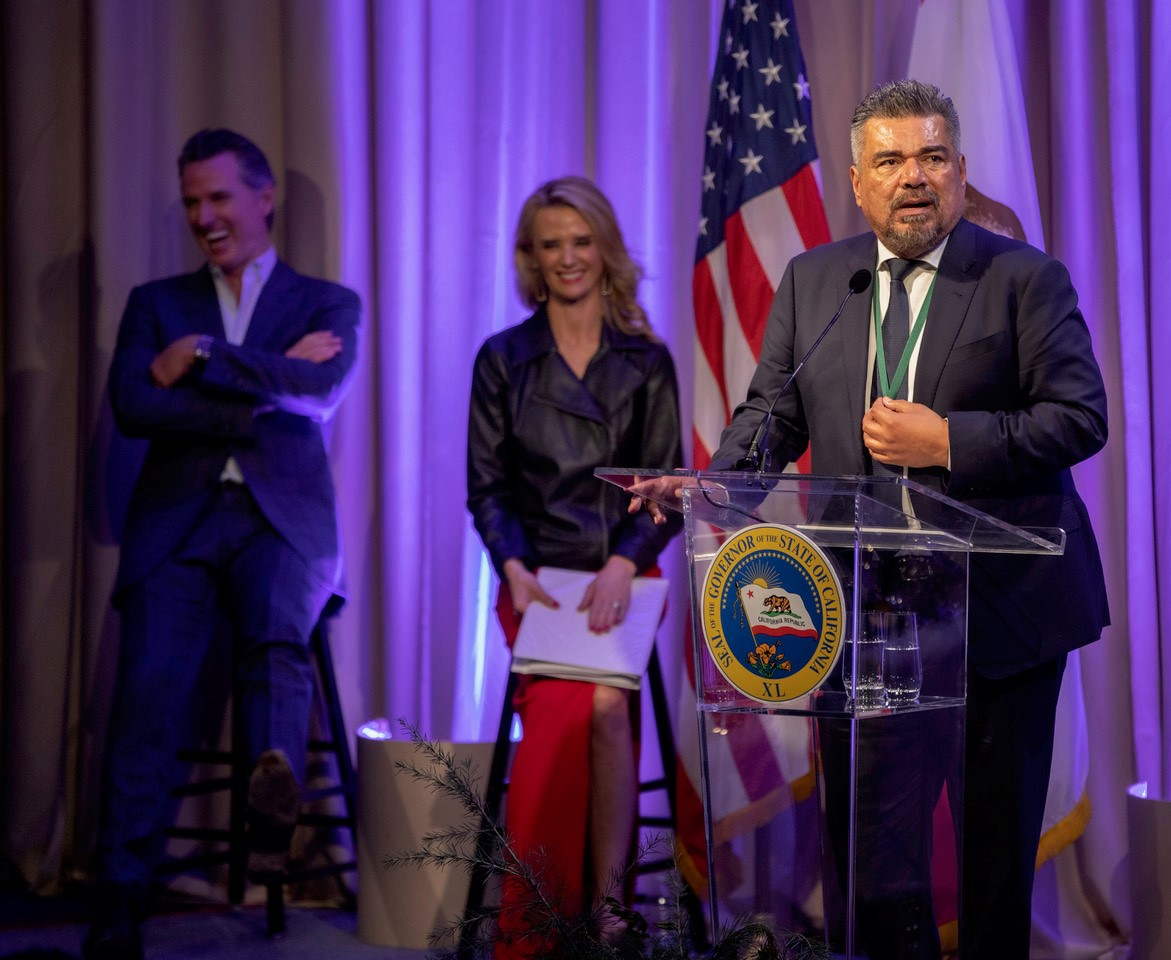
Lopez speaking in 2019 at the California Hall of Fame when he was inducted.

Lopez was a featured celebrity golfer in the 2004 Bob Hope Chrysler Classic and the 2004 AT&T Pebble Beach National Pro-Am. Lopez and his pro partner finished third in the Pebble Beach event. George was the top-ranking celebrity at completion of the tournament. Since 2006, Lopez has served as host of the Bob Hope Chrysler Classic. He is a member at Lakeside Country Club in Burbank, California, and has a 13 handicap.

Lopez heads his own charity, The Ann & George Lopez Foundation. He is a recipient of the Manny Mota Foundation Community Spirit Award and was named Honorary Mayor of Los Angeles for his extensive fund-raising efforts benefiting earthquake victims in El Salvador and Guatemala. In February 2004, Lopez was presented the 2004 Artist of the Year and Humanitarian Award by the Harvard Foundation at Harvard University, presented by its president and dean for his artistic work and charitable endeavors.

Lopez has received several honors for his work and contributions to the Latino community. In September 2004, George was honored with the "Spirit of Liberty Award", presented by People for the American Way. In August 2005, Time magazine recognized George as one of "The 25 Most Influential Hispanics in America". On October 18, 2011, Lopez's elementary school, San Fernando Elementary School, honored him for his beneficent efforts by naming their auditorium after him. Lopez has ensured through his annual toy giveaway that every child at the school receives a gift during the holidays.

== Filmography ==
=== Film ===
Year	Title	Role	Notes
1990	Ski Patrol	Eddie Martinez	
1993	Fatal Instinct	Murder Investigator	
2001	Bread and Roses	Perez	
2002	Real Women Have Curves	Mr. Guzman	
2002	Outta Time	Felix	
2005	The Adventures of Sharkboy and Lavagirl in 3-D	Mr. Electricidad, Mr. Electric, Tobor, Ice Guardian	
2006	Balls of Fury	Ernie Rodriguez	
2006	Tortilla Heaven	Everardo	
2008	Swing Vote	John Sweeney	
2008	Henry Poole Is Here	Father Salizar	
2008	Beverly Hills Chihuahua	Papi	Voice
2010	The Spy Next Door	Glaze	
2010	Valentine's Day	Alfonso	
2010	Marmaduke	Carlos	Voice
2011	Beverly Hills Chihuahua 2	Papi	
2011	The Smurfs	Grouchy Smurf	Voice
2011	Rio	Rafael	Voice
2011	April Apocalypse	Dr. Lyle	
2012	Beverly Hills Chihuahua 3: Viva la Fiesta!	Papi	Voice
2013	Escape from Planet Earth	Thurman	Voice
2013	The Smurfs 2	Grouchy Smurf	Voice
2014	Rio 2	Rafael	Voice
2014	School Dance	Oscar	
2015	Spare Parts	Fredi Cameron	Also producer
2016	Meet the Blacks	President El. Bama	
2016	Car Dogs	Christian	
2016	Aloha Santa		Filming
2017	Gnome Alone	Zook	Voice
2018	River Runs Red	Javier	
2019	El Chicano	Captain Gomez	
2020	The Tax Collector	Uncle Louis	
2020	Cats & Dogs 3: Paws Unite!	Pablo the Parrot	Voice, direct-to-video
2021	No Man's Land	Ramirez	
2021	Walking with Herb	Herb	
2022	The Boss Baby: Christmas Bonus	Santa	
2023	Blue Beetle	Rudy Reyes	
2024	The Underdoggs	Coach Feis	
2025	The SpongeBob Movie: Search for SquarePants	JK Fishlips	Voice

=== Television ===
Year(s)	Title	Role	Notes
2002	Fidel	Chucho Osorio	
2002	The Brothers García	Mr. Fender	Episode: "The Student Buddy"
2002	Curb Your Enthusiasm	Himself	
2002–07	George Lopez	George Lopez	120 episodes Won – Imagen Award for Best Actor – Television (2004); Nominated – NAACP Image Award for Outstanding Actor in a Comedy Series (2004–07); Teen Choice Award for Choice TV Breakout Star – Male; Young Artist Award for Most Popular Mom & Pop in a Television Series (shared with Constance Marie; 2004)
2004	Naughty or Nice	Henry Ramiro	
2006	Freddie	George	Episode: "Freddie Gets Cross Over"
2007	America's Mexican	Himself	HBO special
2007–08	The Naked Brothers Band	Himself	5 episodes
2008, 2022	Reno 911!	Mayor of Reno	4 episodes
2009	Mr. Troop Mom	Eddie Serrano	Nickelodeon film Nominated – ALMA Award for Outstanding TV Comedy Actor; Nominated – Teen Choice Award for Choice Summer TV Star: Male
2009	Tall, Dark, & Chicano	Himself	HBO special
2009–11	Lopez Tonight	Himself/host	Nominated – People's Choice Award for Favorite Talk Show Host (2011)
2012	Take Me Out	Himself/host	
2012	It's Not Me, It's You	Himself	HBO special
2013	Shake It Up	George Martinez	Episode: "In The Bag It Up"
2014	Saint George	George	Series regular (10 episodes); also creator and executive producer
2015	Real Rob	Himself	Episode: "Cleaning House"
2016–17	Lopez	Himself	Series regular and executive-producer 24 episodes
2016	America's Got Talent	Himself (guest judge)	Episode: "Judge Cuts 2"
2017	The Comedy Get Down	Himself	
2018	The Garbage Man Show	Beach Man	Episode: "This is the End"
2019–21	The Casagrandes	Ernesto Estrella	Voice, 3 episodes
2020	Harley Quinn	Himself	Voice, episode: "There's No Place to Go But Down"
2020	Jimmy Kimmel Live!	Himself	Guest host
2021	The Neighborhood	Victor Alvarez	Episode: "Welcome to the Challenge"
2021	Victor and Valentino	José Guadalupe Posada	Voice, episode: "Finding Posada"
2022–25	Lopez vs Lopez	George Lopez	Also creator / executive producer,
2022	The Loud House	Ernesto Estrella	Voice, episode: "Great Lakes Freakout!"

== Accolades ==
Award	Year	Category	Nominated work	Result	Ref.
ALMA Awards	1999	Outstanding Performance by an Individual or Act in a Variety or Comedy Special	2nd Annual Latino Laugh Festival	Nominated	
ALMA Awards	2002	Outstanding Supporting Actor in a Motion Picture	Bread and Roses	Nominated	
ALMA Awards	2006	Outstanding Actor in a Television Series	George Lopez	Nominated	
ALMA Awards	2008	Outstanding Performance of a Lead Latino/Latina Cast in a Motion Picture (Note: Shared with the cast.)	Tortilla Heaven	Nominated	
ALMA Awards	2008	Outstanding Comedy Special	George Lopez: America’s Mexican	Nominated	
ALMA Awards	2009	Outstanding Actor – Comedy	Mr. Troop Mom	Nominated	
ALMA Awards	2011	TV Reality, Variety or Comedy Personality or Act	Lopez Tonight	Won	
ALMA Awards	2012	TV Reality, Variety or Comedy Personality or Act	Take Me Out	Nominated	
BET Comedy Awards	2004	Outstanding Lead Actor in a Comedy Series	George Lopez	Nominated	
Grammy Awards	2004	Best Comedy Album	Team Leader	Nominated	
Grammy Awards	2008	Best Comedy Album	America's Mexican	Nominated	
Grammy Awards	2010	Best Comedy Album	Tall, Dark & Chicano	Nominated	
Imagen Awards	2004	Best Actor in a Television Comedy	George Lopez	Won	
Imagen Awards	2005	Best Actor – Television	George Lopez	Nominated	
Imagen Awards	2006	Best Actor – Television	George Lopez	Nominated	
Imagen Awards	2007	Best Actor – Television	George Lopez	Nominated	
Imagen Awards	2007	Best Variety Show or Reality Show	George Lopez: America’s Mexican	Nominated	
Imagen Awards	2009	Best Actor – Feature Film	Beverly Hills Chihuahua	Nominated	
Imagen Awards	2015	Best Actor – Feature Film	Spare Parts	Won	
Imagen Awards	2017	Best Actor – Television	Lopez	Nominated	
Imagen Awards	2023	Best Actor – Comedy (Television)	Lopez vs Lopez	Nominated	
Imagen Awards	2024	Best Actor – Comedy (Television)	Lopez vs Lopez	Nominated	
Imagen Awards	2024	Best Supporting Actor – Feature Film	Blue Beetle	Nominated	
Imagen Awards	2025	Best Actor – Comedy (Television)	Lopez vs Lopez	Nominated	
Kids' Choice Awards	2009	Favorite Male Movie Star	Beverly Hills Chihuahua	Nominated	
Kids' Choice Awards	2025	Favorite Male TV Star (Family)	Lopez vs Lopez	Nominated	
NAACP Image Awards	2004	Outstanding Actor in a Comedy Series	George Lopez	Nominated	
NAACP Image Awards	2005	Outstanding Actor in a Comedy Series	George Lopez	Nominated	
NAACP Image Awards	2006	Outstanding Actor in a Comedy Series	George Lopez	Nominated	
NAACP Image Awards	2007	Outstanding Actor in a Comedy Series	George Lopez	Nominated	
People's Choice Awards	2011	Favorite Talk Show Host	Himself	Nominated	
Teen Choice Awards	2003	Choice Breakout Male TV Star	George Lopez	Nominated	
Teen Choice Awards	2009	Choice Summer TV Star: Male	Mr. Troop Mom	Nominated	
Teen Choice Awards	2009	Choice Comedian	Himself	Won	
Teen Choice Awards	2010	Choice Comedian	Himself	Nominated	
Teen Choice Awards	2010	Choice Movie: Male Scene Stealer	Valentine's Day	Nominated	
Teen Choice Awards	2011	Choice Comedian	Himself	Nominated	
Teen Choice Awards	2015	Choice Comedian	Himself	Nominated	
Young Artist Awards	2004	Most Popular Mom & Dad in a Television Series (Note: Shared with Constance Marie.)	George Lopez	Nominated	
