= Latinos '08 =

Latinos '08 is a PBS documentary that examines the political influence of Latinos through the lens of the 2008 presidential election. Since 2008, shifting demographics in the United States are reshaping elections, changing the political landscape, and impacting policy at the federal, state, and local levels. Latinos and other racial/ethnic groups are challenging the ways in which politicians, academics and other cultural influencers consider and discuss race by upending this country's black/white racial binary paradigm.

Latinos '08 features interviews with a wide range of prominent Latinos, including Henry Cisneros, consultant Lionel Sosa, columnist Ruben Navarrette Jr., Federico Peña, Ana Navarro, Leslie Sanchez, Luis Cortés of Esperanza USA, and academics Lisa García Bedolla of University of California at Berkeley, Rodolfo de la Garza of Columbia University, Roberto Suro of the University of Southern California and Luis Fraga of the University of Washington.

== Production ==
Latinos '08 was produced and directed by Phillip Rodriguez, an award-winning documentary filmmaker based in Los Angeles. In 2002, Rodriguez founded City Projects, a production company whose films and educational programs challenge ideas about race and diversity in America. Rodriguez' documentary films bring to light the complexities of Latino culture, history, and identity at a time when our nation's demographics reflect unprecedented growth in the Latino community and the concomitant demand for relevant storytelling.

== Reception ==
Latinos '08 received several reviews, including in the Washington Post, the New York Times, and the San Diego Union Tribune, and a 2009 CINE Golden Eagle Award for Best News Analysis.

The Washington Post:

One of the best things about the new PBS documentary Latinos '08 ... is that it challenges a premise of such efforts—the assumption that the Latino vote is a monolithic bloc that can be appealed to and delivered as one. The film commits an even more refreshing heresy: It questions whether the Latino vote really is as critical as everyone says it is ... Yet credit the higher truth-telling of this brisk, brief (one-hour) political, demographic and cultural tour that it also resists taking refuge in easy contrarianism, which is as overly simple as the conventional wisdom. Rather than present us with a neat package of the Latino influence as either-or, this-or-that, it unwraps the package and reveals something with more to it than many presume.

The New York Times:

[T]his zippy little film about the Hispanic vote in the current American presidential election isn't afraid to turn conventional wisdom on its head, including the conventional wisdom that there is even such a thing as a Hispanic vote.

The San Diego-Union Tribune:

One thing [Latinos '08] makes clear is that this subject is much more nuanced and complicated than many people imagine. For instance, most Latinos are registered Democrats, but they have shown a willingness to support moderate Republicans without surrendering their party affiliation. They come from different countries, advocate different agendas, and represent different generations, social status, education levels, and political philosophies. And yet they have also demonstrated they can come together as one community when they're under attack, as many Latinos claim is true with the immigration issue ... Director Philip Rodriguez has done a masterful job of drawing the complexities of Latino voters in ways that help us better understand America.
