= Oscar Zeta Acosta =

American attorney, politician and novelist

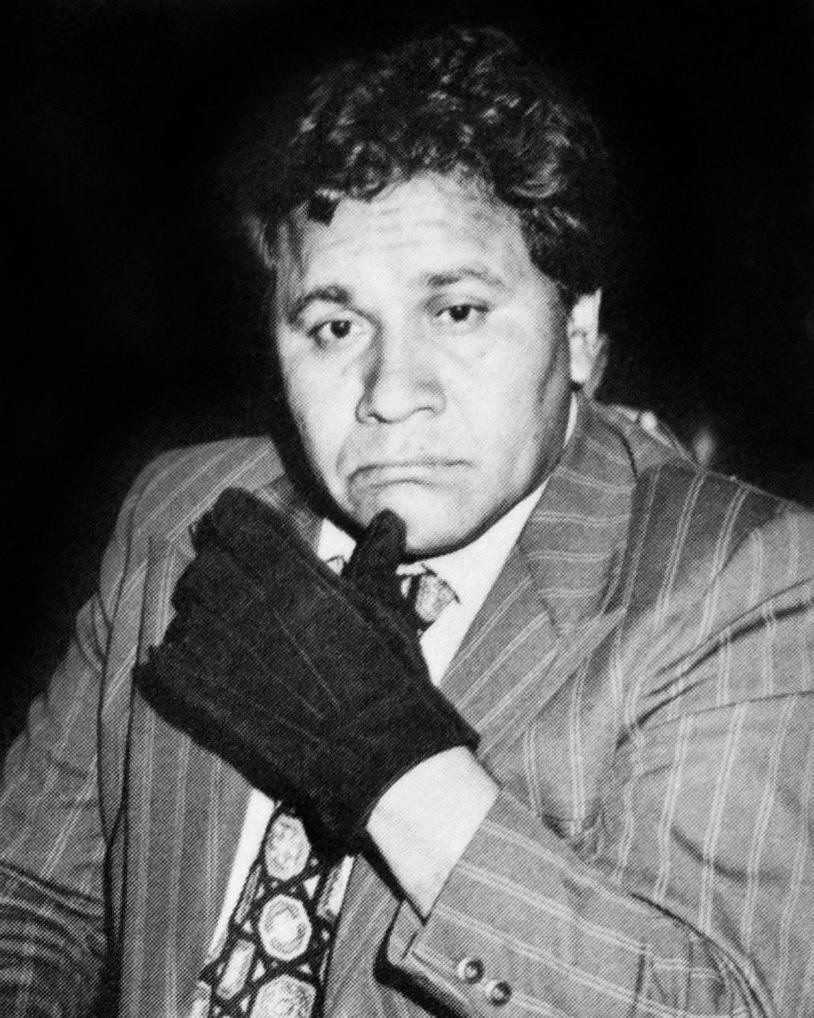
- Acosta in Caesars Palace, Las Vegas, c. March–April 1971
- Born: Oscar Acosta Fierro; April 8, 1935; El Paso, Texas, U.S.
- Disappeared: May 1974 (aged 39); Mazatlán, Sinaloa, Mexico
- Status: Missing, presumed dead after cartel confrontation
- Education: San Francisco State University (BA); San Francisco Law School (JD)
- Occupations: Attorney, author, activist
- Known for: Activism, friendship with Hunter S. Thompson
- Notable work: Autobiography of a Brown Buffalo; The Revolt of the Cockroach People
- Movement: Chicano Movement

Oscar "Zeta" Acosta Fierro (/əˈkɒstə/; April 8, 1935 – disappeared May 1974) was an American attorney, author and activist in the Chicano Movement. He wrote the semi-autobiographical novels Autobiography of a Brown Buffalo (1972) and The Revolt of the Cockroach People (1973), and was friends with American author Hunter S. Thompson. Thompson characterized him as a heavyweight Samoan attorney, Dr. Gonzo, in his 1971 novel Fear and Loathing in Las Vegas. Acosta disappeared in 1974 during a trip in Mexico and is presumed dead.

== Life and career ==
Oscar Acosta was born in El Paso, Texas, to Manuel and Juanita (née Fierro) Acosta, from Mexico and El Paso, respectively. He was the third child born, but second to survive childhood. Acosta had an older brother, Roberto, born in 1934. After the family moved to California, the children were raised in the small San Joaquin Valley rural community of Riverbank, near Modesto. Acosta's father was drafted during World War II.

After finishing high school, Acosta joined the U.S. Air Force. Following his discharge, he worked his way through Modesto Junior College. Acosta went on to San Francisco State University where he studied creative writing, becoming the first member of his family to get a college education. He attended night classes at San Francisco Law School and passed the state bar exam in 1966. In 1967, Acosta began working locally as an antipoverty attorney for the East Oakland Legal Aid Society.

In 1968, Acosta moved to East Los Angeles and joined the Chicano Movement as an activist attorney, defending Chicano groups and activists. He represented the Chicano 13 of the East L.A. walkouts, members of the Brown Berets, Rodolfo Gonzales, and other residents of the East L.A. barrio. Acosta's controversial defenses earned him the ire of the Los Angeles Police Department, who often followed and harassed him. In 1970, he ran for sheriff of Los Angeles County against Peter J. Pitchess, and received more than 100,000 votes. During the campaign, Acosta was jailed for two days for contempt of court. He vowed that if elected, he would do away with the Sheriff's Department as it was then constituted. Known for loud ties and a flowered attaché case with a Chicano Power sticker, Acosta lost to Pitchess' 1.3 million votes but beat Everett Holladay, chief of police of Monterey Park.

In 1972, Acosta published his first novel, Autobiography of a Brown Buffalo, about a lawyer fighting for the rights of a marginalized people. In 1973, he published The Revolt of the Cockroach People, a fictionalized version of the 1970 Chicano Moratorium as well as an account of the death of Los Angeles Times columnist Rubén Salazar.

== Friendship with Hunter S. Thompson ==
In the summer of 1967, Acosta met author Hunter S. Thompson. In 1971, Thompson wrote an article about Acosta and the injustice in the barrios of East Los Angeles, as well as the death of Salazar, for Rolling Stone magazine, titled "Strange Rumblings in Aztlan". While working on that article, Thompson received an offer from Sports Illustrated to cover an off-road race outside Las Vegas. He invited Acosta to join him, and the two men returned to Las Vegas for a second weekend. Thompson wrote about their adventures in a two-part article for Rolling Stone that appeared in 1971. The following year, Random House published Fear and Loathing in Las Vegas as a nonfiction title.

The legal department of the publisher of Fear and Loathing said the book could not be published without clearance by Acosta, as references to him were recognizable. Acosta initially refused the clearance, saying that he was insulted by Thompson's alteration of his race—Thompson had described him as a "300-pound Samoan." He understood, however, that inserting his real name and race would necessitate extensive rewriting and delay publication of the book, so he promised clearance provided that his name and picture would appear on the dustjacket. He later claimed a portion of the film rights, which led to more acrimony.

Scholar David S. Wills, in High White Notes: The Rise and Fall of Gonzo Journalism, argued that it was Acosta who pushed Thompson to pursue the theme of the American Dream and indeed provided much of the plot of the novel through his actions in Las Vegas. He asserts that this is likely the reason why Acosta felt so aggrieved, citing various letters and audio recordings of the two men. Acosta even complained to one of Thompson's editors, "Hunter has stolen my soul. He has taken my best lines and has used me."

Although Thompson and Acosta attempted to work together one more time, their relationship was strained by the dispute over Fear and Loathing in Las Vegas, and it never fully recovered. After Acosta's disappearance and presumed death, it took Thompson several years before he wrote an obituary for his friend, "The Banshee Screams for Buffalo Meat". In it, Thompson called Acosta "a stupid, vicious quack with no morals at all and the soul of a hammerhead shark." Ralph Steadman explained that Thompson "berated most of his friends a lot, but somehow it was funny. His way of expressing love for people was to be both angry and insulting."

== Disappearance ==
In May 1974, Acosta disappeared while traveling in Mazatlán, Sinaloa, Mexico. His son, Marco Acosta, believes that he was the last person to talk to his father. Acosta telephoned his son from Mazatlán, telling him that he was "about to board a boat full of white snow." Marco is later quoted in reference to his father's disappearance: "The body was never found, but we surmise that probably, knowing the people he was involved with, he ended up mouthing off, getting into a fight, and getting killed."

In 1977, Thompson's investigation of Acosta's disappearance, titled "The Banshee Screams for Buffalo Meat", was published in Rolling Stone. According to Thompson, Acosta was a powerful attorney and spokesman, but suffered from an addiction to amphetamines and had a predilection for LSD. Thompson wrote that he believed Acosta was either murdered by drug dealers or was the victim of a political assassination. Others have speculated that Acosta overdosed or suffered a nervous breakdown during his trip.

Acosta was declared legally dead in absentia in December 1986.

== Motion pictures ==
The film Where the Buffalo Roam (1980) loosely depicts Acosta's life and his relationship with Thompson. Its name is derived from Thompson's article about Acosta, "The Banshee Screams for Buffalo Meat", in reference to Acosta's book Autobiography of a Brown Buffalo. Actor Peter Boyle portrayed Acosta, whose character is named Carl Lazlo, Esquire, and Bill Murray portrayed Thompson.

Fear and Loathing in Las Vegas (1998) is a film adaptation of Thompson's 1972 novel of the same name, a fictionalized account of Thompson and Acosta's trip to Las Vegas in 1971. Benicio del Toro portrays Acosta, referred to in the film and novel as Dr. Gonzo, while Johnny Depp portrays Thompson (under the alias of Raoul Duke).

The Rise and Fall of the Brown Buffalo (2017) is a documentary of the life and career of Acosta, with dramatic reenactments. The documentary was directed by Phillip Rodriguez and produced by Benicio del Toro.

== See also ==
- American literature in Spanish
- Latino literature
- List of people who disappeared
