= Brown Is the New Green: George Lopez and the American Dream =

- Directed by: Phillip Rodriguez
- Produced by: Phillip Rodriguez
- Starring: George Lopez, Hector Orcí, Bill Dana, Arlene Dávila, Alex Nogales, Bruce Helford
- Release date: 2007
- Country: United States
- Language: English

Brown Is the New Green: George Lopez and the American Dream is a 2007 American documentary directed and produced by Phillip Rodriguez. The film examines the ways in which efforts to profit from Latinos are shaping the Latino identity. Comedian George Lopez is the focus of the film, offering the viewer a behind-the-scenes look at the comedian's life and career and the ways in which he has advocated for Latinos in media and entertainment.

== Production ==
Phillip Rodriguez is a documentary filmmaker and veteran content provider for PBS. His last four films for public television have been broadcast in primetime to wide acclaim. He is the founder of City Projects, a production company whose films and educational programs challenge ideas about race and diversity in America. Rodriguez' documentary films bring to light the complexities of Latino culture, history, and identity at a time when our nation’s demographics reflect unprecedented growth in the Latino community and the concomitant demand for relevant storytelling.

=== Casting ===
George Lopez is an American comedian, actor, and talk show host who often examines race, class and other social issues in his work. Lopez, who is Mexican-American, often challenges the stereotypes of Latinos that persist in media and popular culture. Brown Is the New Green also features other Latino leaders and industry executives, including Hector Orcí , Bill Dana, Arlene Dávila, Alex Nogales, and Bruce Helford.

== Synopsis ==
Brown Is the New Green examines the ways in which the media and entertainment industry shape America's perception of Latinos. The documentary’s focal point is comedian George Lopez, an icon and advocate for Latinos’ move into the mainstream.

Brown Is the New Green offers rare behind-the-scenes access to Lopez’s life as he shares his struggles to represent Latinos in a manner true to their realities and aspirations. Lopez normalizes the image of Latinos in a way that delights and entertains. In contrast to Lopez's endeavors are the efforts of marketers intent on spinning Latinos as a wholly distinct subculture. The show also features conversations with members of the much-coveted Latino youth market, whose tastes and interests are far more eclectic than the marketers would have us believe.

== Awards ==
Brown Is the New Green won the Best Documentary for Television Imagen Award, 2008. The Imagen Foundation is an organization dedicated to promoting and encouraging positive and accurate portrayals of Latino characters and production storylines in film and television. The film was also nominated for a 2008 Alma Award.
