= The Revolt of the Cockroach People =

Book by Oscar Zeta Acosta

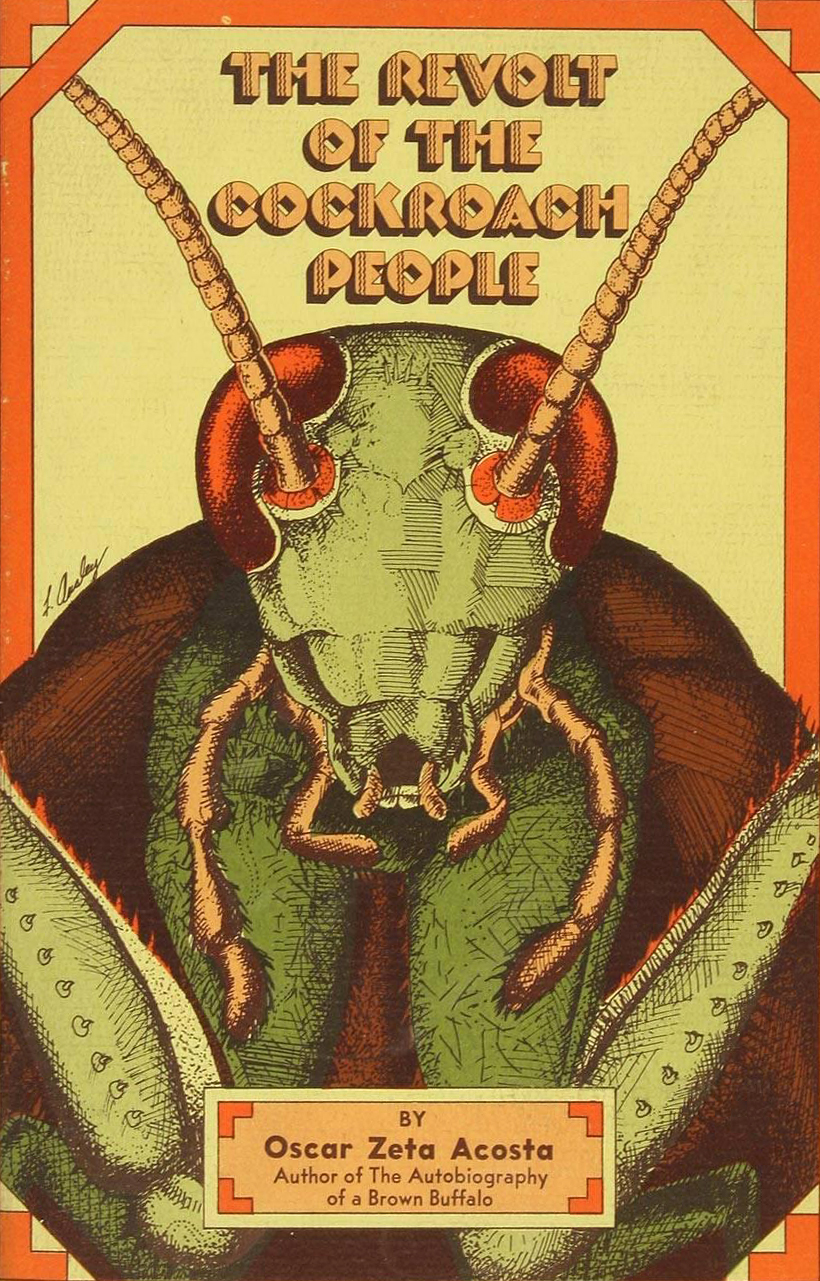
- First edition
- Author: Oscar Zeta Acosta
- Language: English
- Publisher: Straight Arrow Press
- Publication date: 1973
- Publication place: United States
- Pages: 258
- ISBN: 0-87932-060-5
- Preceded by: Autobiography of a Brown Buffalo

The Revolt of the Cockroach People is a novel by Oscar Zeta Acosta. It tells the story of a Chicano lawyer, "Buffalo Zeta Brown", fictionalizing events from Oscar Acosta's own life, including the East L.A. walkouts at Garfield High School, the founding of the Brown Berets, the Christmas protests at St. Basil's church, the Castro v. Superior Court decision of 1970, Acosta's run for sheriff of Los Angeles County later that year, the Chicano National Moratorium, and the death of Ruben Salazar, who is referred to as "Roland Zanzibar" in the novel. The novel is written in the style of Gonzo journalism, the conventions of which he helped codify with American journalist and friend Hunter S. Thompson. The story of Buffalo Z. Brown, a persona of the author, satirizes the East L.A. Chicano movement through the eyes of a participant observer. Acosta uses the historical events of the late 1960s and early 1970s "as the context for the construction of a Chicano identity and the realization of a revolutionary class consciousness."

Acosta frames Brown as a lawyer who understands the United States's legal system as both arbitrary and differential, and therefore comes to the realization that an "objective truth" can never materialize "either in the courtroom or elsewhere." Through the character of Brown, Acosta acknowledges that what is understood as "truth" is a social construct or cultural convention. This realization is destabilizing yet invigorating for Brown, who understands that law can function both "as a tool of repression but it may also be used to project a radically new form of legality that cannot be achieved within present institutions," as described by Mexican-American scholar Ramón Saldívar. Saldívar characterizes this as an important moment for Brown (and Acosta), as he understands that "ideological commitment to a cause" is not a matter of identifying "truth" or "falsehood" but an "issue of taking sides in a struggle between embattled groups."

== Plot Summary ==
Chapters 1-5

Continuing the events of the previous novel, Brown has moved to Los Angeles to participate in the Chicano Movement. The novel starts in medias res, during the 1969 Christmas protest at St. Basil Catholic Church. The demonstrators, many associated with the Chicano Militants, protest against the Church's perceived wealth and neglect of the poor, and specifically against the Cardinal McIntyre. The protestors carry religious objects and candles, and demand admission during the Christmas Mass. Brown accompanies other activists approaching the building, where they encounter ushers who refuse to allow them in.

One of the activists, Gilbert Rodriguez, attempts to persuade the ushers to open the doors, but the dispute turns violent when an usher strikes him. Other demonstrators get involved, and the police show up and attempt to force the activists from the church. The protestors attempt to appeal to the congregation and gain their support, while Brown identifies himself as the group's lawyer and confronts Sergeant Armas, a Mexican-American police officer in charge of the responding force. After witnessing the police use force on the protestors, Brown returns to this apartment to prepare statements for the press. He then gets a phone call from a journalist named Jesus, who explains that he had been following Brown's travels. Brown then recaps the situation, during which the narrative shifts back to 1968.

When Brown first arrives in Los Angeles in January 1968, he intends to go back to practicing law while writing a book about his experiences. After several years of travel, he is financially unstable and uncertain about the future. He stays with his sister in the San Fernando Valley and begins searching for work. Brown reflects on his unsuccessful attempts to establish himself after law school, including a brief stint at a legal aid office in East Oakland. He considers his own feelings of estrangement from both conventional American society and from his own identity as a Mexican-American. During this period, he reconnected with Manuel, an old friend from his hometown of Riverbank, California.

Manuel, a former athlete who failed to qualify for the Olympics, had become a teacher and a coach. The two meet at a restaurant in East Los Angeles and discuss professional ambition, and the status of Chicanos in society. Manuel criticizes Brown's unconventional lifestyle, and Brown questions Manuel's attachment to individual success. Their conversation leads Brown to remember his childhood in Riverbank, where he and several Chicano classmates considered organizing a protest against the discriminatory policies of their grammar school. Brown recalled how the students were initially on board with the protest, then abandoned the plan due to pressure from school authorities and their families. This connection reinforced Brown's frustration with discrimination in greater society and with organizing in general.

Three months after his initial arrival in L.A, Brown meets Gilbert Rodriguez, Risco, and Ruth at the headquarters of the Chicano Militants. The organization operates from the basement of an Episcopal church, in which members distribute political literature and plan demonstrations. Brown initially approaches the activists to gather material for an article he had hoped to write, with Gilbert and Risco expressing doubt about his intentions and background as both a writer and lawyer. Brown responded with his experience in defending criminal cases and expressed intrigue into the organization itself. The activists then invite Brown to join them at a student walkout at a local high school.

The next morning, Brown arrives at the school, where Chicano students are preparing to protest discriminatory educational conditions. As the students begin to leave, the school's faculty and officials attempt to thwart the demonstration. Gilbert, Risco, and the other organizers encourage the students to continue protesting, but the confrontation turns violent once the police arrive. Brown watches as the students resist the police, and the demonstration turns into a march throughout East Los Angeles. The demonstration quickly brings back the memory of his failed childhood protest in Riverbank. Although he initially intended to only attend the protest for writing purposes, Brown becomes increasingly sympathetic to the cause and considers joining on the side of the protestors.

In April 1968, Brown travels to Delano, California to meet Cesar Chavez, the leader of the farmworkers movement. Brown had admired Chavez during law school and considered becoming an attorney for the union. When he arrives, Chavez is recovering from a long fast to reaffirm his commitment to nonviolence. Chavez reveals that he knows about Brown's association with the Chicano Militants through Gilbert and Risco. Brown admits that he is uncertain about his role in the movement and questions whether the militant's more confrontational tactics are appropriate. Chavez explains that different forms of activism can help the greater cause and encourages Brown to use his legal experience to assist in the struggle.

The meeting profoundly affects Brown, who returns to Los Angeles reflecting on Chavez's words and dedication to the cause. Although he remains uncertain about his future, he is certain that his legal skills can assist the Chicano Movement. Brown establishes a law office out of a hotel and offers his services to the Chicano community. His business cards identify Brown specifically as a Chicano, provoking a reaction from a judge during a court appearance. Brown rebukes the judge's criticism, arguing that his ethnic identity does not impact his ability to practice law. This encounter further disillusions Brown with the discrimination within the justice system.

On May 31, 1968, Brown receives a call from Ruth informing him that the police had raised the Chicano Militants' headquarters. He proceeds to the church, where Gilbert, Risco, and several other activist have already been arrested. Brown learns that a L.A County grand jury had indicted thirteen members of the movement in charges connected to the school walkouts. He travels to the detention facility, where the activists initially underestimate the severity of the charges. Brown explains that he had learned that each of the defendants could face up to forty-five years in prison. The groups discusses the political circumstances surrounding their arrests, with the indictments coinciding with the presidential primary and the campaigns of Robert Kennedy and Eugene McCarthy.

Brown agrees to defend the activists in court but doubts his experience with such a politically charged case. The activists who avoided arrest discuss how to respond to the indictments, planning demonstrations, picketing, and a hunger strike. Gilbert proposes that Brown become the public face of the campaign, and the other activists support the idea. Brown meets with the other members of the movement, including Ruth and Black Eagle, to organize a protest outside of the detention facility. A large crowd gathers outside of the jail, with Brown leading the masses. He leads the crowd in a march towards the town square, beginning his emergence as a prominent leader in the Chicano Movement.

Chapters 6-10

Following his involvement in the movement and the legal defense of the Chicano Militants, Buffalo Zeta Brown receives financial support connected to the McCarthy campaign, but the check is returned before the payment is resolved. By this point Buffalo Brown became increasingly disillusioned with the stress around the trial, and of the life of an organizer. He travels with Gilbert and a few of the militants to Lake Elsinore for a drug and alcohol fueled getaway. While discussing internal doubts and disagreements, Gilbert proposes a "Brown Buffalo Party", an organization to establish Chicano political power. The excursion then turns to chaos as Brown beings intensely hallucinating threatening figures and nightmares of American imperialism.

After returning to Los Angeles, Brown supports efforts to build political support for the defendants arrested in connection to the walkouts. He and the activists secure a meeting with Mayor Sam Yorty, attended by the accused. Brown attempts to persuade the mayor to intervene in the prosecution, while the activists challenge the city's mistreatment of the Chicano community. The meeting deteriorates when Yorty accuses the activists of provoking the conflict themselves. Brown and the group leave City Hall empty handed, when they later encounter a group of Catholic law students attempting to arrange a meeting with Cardinal McIntyre about the Church's relationship to the Chicanos community. Their efforts are unsuccessful, and Brown becomes even more opposed to the Catholic establishment. The narrative then flashes forward to the Christmas Eve protest at St. Basil's

Back on Christmas Day in 1969, several hours after the confrontation at the church, Brown and other Chicano activists return to continue protesting. Reporters question Brown about the movement's objectives, while he argues that the protestors are against unfair political and economic influence rather than against religion itself. The controversy begins to attract national attention, and Brown receives calls from both supporters and critics. In addition to this, Brown begins to feel the pressure of his newfound political status, as well as the ongoing trial of the activists.

Brown and the Chicano Militants organize a hunger strike to further protest the Church, establishing a temporary encampment. Supporters show to sing and show solidarity, while the activists construct shelters and distribute information. Brown gradually becomes more aware of the physical pain of fasting and gets frustrated by the behavior of the participants. As the protest grows, Brown begins to doubt his own ability to maintain the serious town of a political leader.

The narrative then turns to the death of Robert Fernandez, a seventeen-year-old Mexican American whose family approaches Brown for legal assistance. The family explains that Robert died while in LAPD custody, and the authorities had classified the death as a suicide. The family believes this was done to hide the true nature of Robert's death, and that he had suspicious wounds on his body following his death. Brown believes the family's account and agrees to investigate the case.

Brown contacts officials in the Coroner's Office and examines the evidence surrounding Robert's death. Brown questions the initial judgement by the medical personnel and contacts an independent doctor for a second opinion. The report concluded that the evidence could not support either that the wounds were self-inflicted or the cause of homicide. This only serves to reinforce his suspicions, and Brown becomes determined to challenge the ruling. His investigation attracts the attention of the media, and the scrutiny of the authorities.

Brown questions medical experts and law enforcement officials associated with Robert's arrest and death evaluation. He challenges testimony around his injuries and his discovery in his cell. Brown also attacked the credibility of the officials at the scene. Although Brown fights passionately in the courtroom, the jury ultimately upholds the verdict of suicide. Brown remains convinced that Robert was murdered and that an important detail had been missed in the investigation.

Brown continues to spend time with Gilbert and the other activists, discussing politics and the possibility of achieving change through elections. Brown expresses interest in campaigning for the sheriff of Los Angeles County, as a way to achieve justice for the Chicano community. Although he had originally meant it as a joke, Brown and the group begin to seriously consider the possibility, and begin taking steps to prepare for a campaign.

Chapters 11-15

As Buffalo Zeta Brown prepares to campaign for sheriff, he appears on a Spanish-language television program hosted by Roland Zanzibar. Brown explains that his campaign will focus on police misconduct and the mistreatment of the Chicano community, while acknowledging that he lacks the money or support of the incumbent sheriff. Instead, he intends to use the election as a way to spread awareness for the Chicano movement. At the same time, Brown prepares to defend the activists involved in the St. Basil's protests in court. The trial is assigned to a Judge Nebron, who Brown clashes with over the jury selection, which Brown feels that is setting up for a rigged trial.

Through the proceedings, Brown frequently conflicts with the judge and prosecution while questioning witnesses about the events of the Christmas Mass protests, challenging testimony about protestor behavior and the police's use of force. Brown's confrontational behavior in court leads the judge to hold him in contempt of court, and that Brown and the defendants to be taken into custody. Brown himself is taken to the county jail, where he still continues to prepare his defense despite the detention.

The trial lasts about one month, during which Brown becomes a prominent figure in news coverage. The prosecution attempts to portray the defense as disruptive radicals, while Brown delivers an emotional speech to the jury, describing the colonial history of Mexico with the subsequent discrimination against Mexican Americans lasting to the modern day. He argues that the protestors sought recognition and equality, not just to cause violence. His address attracts enthusiastic supporters from the courtroom.

After deliberation, the jury comes to a mixed verdict, 15 defendants found guilty, while 6 are acquitted. Judge Nebron sentences several of the convicted to jail, but Brown still recognizes this as a partial victory. Brown later receives a call from one of the jurors and believes that her account could overturn the convictions. This arrangement becomes a personal relationship and ends up further complicating Brown's efforts in the trial and in his political campaign.

Brown's campaign further gains publicity as activists, political, and pop culture figures organize a rally at University of Southern California in support of the movement. Brown is introduced at the event but finds the growing publicity more and more uncomfortable. He is stuck by the dissonance between the celebrity appearances and the painful struggles against discrimination for the activists on a daily basis.

As the campaign continues, and more and more recognizable figures are attracted to Brown's movement, he questions students at UCLA on whether they believed that their expressions of solidarity would actually result in any concrete action. This disagreement with the audience reinforces Brown's feelings that the movement is becoming more superficial as it grows.

Brown ends up finishing second in the race for sheriff, and an appellate court intervened on behalf of some of the convicted. However, exhausted by the situation, he leaves L.A and heads to Acapulco to meet with his brother Jesus.

Brown reconnects with Jesus and spends time returning to drugs and alcohol, distancing himself from the political storm up north. While in the mountains, Jesus tells him the story of a local Indigenous leader who resisted the stealing of his people's land before being killed. Buffalo Brown draws similarities between the movement and the story yet remains reluctant to return to the United States. He later learns that the unrest has gotten worse, the journalist Roland Zanzibar had been killed, and more activists had been arrested.

Disturbed by this, Brown returns to Los Angeles, and back to the courtroom. He continues to challenge the law's depiction of the protestors as violent, and his aggressive courtroom tactics lead him to conflict with another judge, Alacran, who also threatens to hold Brown in contempt.

Brown later encounters Gibert Rodriguez and the other Chicanos again, who criticize Brown's leave during such a critical time, and if he even is committed to the movement. Brown responds defensively, explaining that his years of legal work have left him exhausted. The group visits the scene of the protests and discuss the ongoing prosecutions. Brown continues to express frustration with the movement's internal disagreements. To the group's disapproval, Brown discloses that once the trial is over, he wants to return to being a solely a writer.

Chapters 16-18

Brown's house in Los Angeles increasingly becomes a headquarters for militant activity, increasingly to his unease. In a private meeting with Corky Gonzales and the rest of the militants, Corky refuses to support direct confrontation, while still believing in self-defense. The discussion further exposes the disagreements that Brown has been uneasy about.

While the movement works out internal struggles, Brown continues the legal defense of the protestors, in which he achieved an appeal to question the Superior Court about the selection of the grand jury, and he prepares an army of witnesses. Brown calls judges and community experts to testify, proving the discrimination against Chicanos in the Los Angeles justice system. Brown rebukes the challenges from the prosecution by attacking their political affiliations and suspicious selection of a jury. Buffalo Brown argues that the jury selection deliberately excluded Mexican Americans, denying the defendants their right to a fair trial.

As the courtroom exchanges grow more heated between Brown, the judge, and the prosecution, he repeatedly is subject to warnings of contempt from the judge. Brown attempts to publish an account from the defendant's perspective in the local paper but is turned down due to a conflict of interest. The conflict with the judge comes to a head when Brown is again ordered into custody.

The trial continues with heated exchanges and striking testimonies, including from a police officer who infiltrated the movement under a false name, which Brown shuts down by saying that the LAPD had known about the militants' activities but never acted upon them. He then cites incidents of police brutality during the protests, connecting it to Zanizbar's death. Brown himself faces accusations of being a militant, but then Cesar Chavez appears as a character witness, attesting to his reputation and friendship.

Following closing deliberations, the jury acquits the Chicanos of all felony charges, only Corky is convicted of a misdemeanor with 40 days in county jail. Despite this seeming like a major victory, Brown remained angry at the discrimination within the justice system, and later, the militants conduct an attack on the Hall of Justice. While supporters celebrate the courtroom victory, and explosion is heard from the courthouse, and one man was found dead. Brown then leaves Los Angeles for San Francisco, recognizing the need to distance himself from the movement and go back to his personal dream of being a writer, describing all of this in his memoirs.

== Reception ==
As Marcial Gonzalez notes, "not all critics have shared a favorable opinion of Acosta's novel". Critics argued the novel gave shallow explorations of ethnicity, and exaggerates many aspects of the Chicano movement in East LA in a manner not representative to the real events. During this time, Chicano literature assisted in shaping the cultural tropes and concepts of Chicanismo, "creat[ing] socially engaged works fusing mimetic reflections of the socio-political conditions of Chicana/os with myths and symbols." Critics hold a shared interpretation that the novel satirizes aspects of Chicanismo and criticizes the contradictions within the movement. Marc Priewe argues that Acosta proposes a "reflexive nationalism," against essentialist attitudes of the Chicano movement. Some believe that reception from Chicano critics reject Acosta's novel because of its criticism of Chicano nationalism building at the time.

== See also ==
- Chicano Liberation Front
