= Los Angeles Now =

- Directed by: Phillip Rodriguez
- Produced by: Phillip Rodriguez
- Release date: November 23, 2004
- Country: United States

Los Angeles Now is a 60-minute documentary by producer/director Phillip Rodriguez. It first aired in November 2004 on PBS’s Independent Lens series.

The documentary examines the ways in which changing demographics in the City of Los Angeles have created one of the largest and most diverse cities on Earth and, yet in spite of this, the entertainment industry's representations of Los Angeles remain stale, often overlooking the city's vast cultural transformation. The film also ponders the ways in which Los Angeles serves as a diagnostic for other urban centers in the United States, particularly given the influx and influence of immigrants from around the world.

Several prominent Los Angeles figures are interviewed in the film, including actress Salma Hayek, philanthropist Eli Broad, author and essayist Richard Rodriguez, and Cardinal Roger Mahony.

== Reception ==
Los Angeles Now was screened at the Redcat (Roy and Edna Disney/CalARts Theatre), the Harvard Film Archives, the J. Paul Getty Museum and the Centre Pompidou in Paris, France.
