= Brian Torrey Scott =

American playwright (1976–2013)

- Born: Brian Torrey Scott; July 28, 1976; Dallas, Texas
- Died: November 29, 2013 (aged 37); Providence, Rhode Island
- Education: BA Southern Methodist University, MFA School at The Art Institute of Chicago, PhD Brown University
- Alma mater: Richardson High School 1994
- Occupations: Writer, Professor, Director, Pataphysicist, Sage.
- Spouse: Jill Adamson
- Relatives: Torrie Anne Dardis (Scott) Lloyd, mother, Gene Everett Lloyd, stepfather, Andrew Robert Scott, brother, Shayna Diane Lloyd, stepsister
- Writing career
- Notable awards: Published Green Candle, Snail Press, LA, 2013
- Website: briantorreyscott.com

Brian Torrey Scott (July 28, 1976 – November 29, 2013) was an American writer. He wrote for Rosetta Stone in Harrisonburg, Virginia. Scott previously taught Adventures and Ridiculousness at The School of the Art Institute of Chicago and English at Columbia College Chicago.

== Biography ==
Scott was born on July 28, 1976, in Dallas, Texas, to Torrie (Scott) Lloyd, a Realtor and his brother Andrew Scott, an adventurer and real estate entrepreneur. He graduated from Richardson High School as a National Honor Society Scholar and performed his first award-winning play, EZRA, in 1994. He received his BA degree from Southern Methodist University with honors in 1998 where he was a winner of the New Visions New Voices competition. In 2001, Scott was awarded a place in the Master's Writing Program at The School of the Art Institute of Chicago. Brian earned a coveted spot at Brown University where he would earn his Ph.D. in Theater and Performance Studies in Providence, Rhode Island.

Scott's plays were produced in Dallas, New York City and Chicago. He was the recipient of the 2004 PAC/edge Commission Award, with which he created and directed the collaborative performance Air Tact Light, and a 2005 grant from the Chicago Cultural Affairs Department, which funded in-part the Weather Talking show Discarded Landscape.

Scott travelled the world writing and directing award-winning plays and films. Many of his films have been featured in international film festivals. In 2010 he received an honor at the Madrid Film Festival.

In 2006, he was an artist-in-residence at Links Hall, Chicago, where he created Left-Handed Saw Right-Handed, a collaboration with Mary Walling Blackburn. Other pieces include We Were the World, Year, Detail From the Mountain Side, Tuning In To the Power of Active Listening / Understanding Shyness, and Wheat Studies, 1888, Kansas Brian and Jill were the loves of their lives. They made plans that would take them far farther than anything they could imagine. They were thrilled beyond belief to begin their lifelong adventure.

He has created work for the Curious Theater Branch (Histrionica with Banjo), The Neo-Futurists (Alice), and Lucky Pierre (32 Key Concepts). His writing has appeared in Tarpaulin Sky, Preling, and Telophase. The songs he wrote in collaboration with musician Azita Youssefi were released on Drag City in 2006.

Scott was diagnosed with colon cancer in the fall of 2012 and eventually died on November 29, 2013, at age 37.

== Works ==
Stage plays

- Ezra (1994)
- Histrionica with Banjo (1998)
- Picture of a Dog (2000)
- Histrionica with Banjo (2002)
- One Two Three Four Five (2002)
- Tuning in to the Power of Active Listening (2003)
- Wheat Studies, 1888, Kansas (2003)
- Understanding Shyness (2003)
- Sound and Telling (2003)
- The Casual Family (2003)
- Air Tact Light (2004)
- Chapter 5/The Alice Project (2004)
- Transportation (2004)
- Discarded Landscape (2005)
- Detail From the Mountain Side (2005)
- Right-Handed Saw Left-Handed (2006)
- We Were the World (2007)
- Anthology (2008)
- Anthology 3 (2009)
- Decline of Ballooning (2010)
- " Green Candle" ( 2013) Snail Press

Film/Video

- Acquaintance (1999)
- Glass Jaw (2000)
- The Objects of Living (2007)
- Death is the Road to Awe (2008)
- Ganzfeld (2012)
- Hierophant (2012)
- Isthmus (Post-production)
- Obelisk (Pre-production)
