= Autobiography of a Brown Buffalo =

1972 novel by Oscar Zeta Acosta

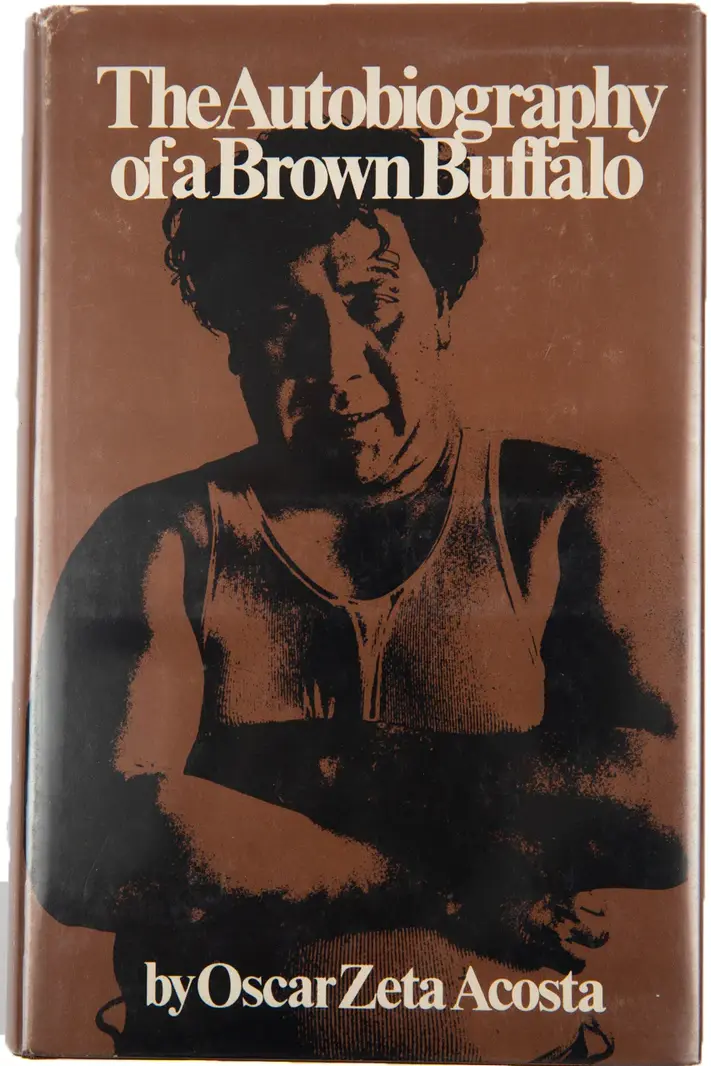
- First edition cover
- Author: Oscar Zeta Acosta
- Language: English
- Genre: Autobiographical novel
- Publisher: Straight Arrow Books
- Publication date: 1972
- Publication place: United States
- Media type: Print (paperback)
- ISBN: 0-87932-035-4
- OCLC: 508276
- Dewey Decimal: 978/.0046872/0092 B 21
- LC Class: CT275.A186 A3
- Followed by: The Revolt of the Cockroach People

Autobiography of a Brown Buffalo is the first novel by Oscar Zeta Acosta and it focuses on his own self-discovery in a fictionalized manner. An autobiography, the plot presents an alienated lawyer of Mexican descent, who works in an Oakland, California antipoverty agency, without any sense of purpose or identity.

== Plot summary ==
The main character survives on drugs, alcohol, and counseling sessions until he becomes a Chicano activist. At the end of the work, the protagonist takes the middle name "Zeta", a symbol that represents his Chicano and Mexican culture and roots. After traveling to his birthplace, the lost character discovers himself and learns lessons on the road as he reflects on his life.

Some copies of the book note, "Oscar Zeta Acosta was famous as a Robin Hood Chicano lawyer and notorious as the real-life model for Hunter S. Thompson's 'Dr. Gonzo', a character in the book and movie Fear and Loathing in Las Vegas.

=== Chapters 1–5 ===
The first five chapters take place on July 1, 1967; the narrative, however, is frequently broken up by flashbacks that explain the narrator’s relationship with various characters. The story begins in the morning as the narrator is preparing to go to work. Standing naked in front of the mirror, he reflects on his large brown body and his general health. He is both constipated and suffers from ulcers, which cause him to vomit. While looking in the mirror, he seeks advice from his “three favorite men”: Humphrey Bogart, James Cagney, and Edward G. Robinson. He also hears the voice of Dr. Serbin, his psychiatrist, who seems to be following him and who appears throughout the novel. The narrator masturbates in the shower while fantasizing about a friend's wife.

The narrator leaves his apartment in San Francisco and drives to Oakland, where he works as a legal aid lawyer. He has worked in the office since he passed the bar exam 12 months before. To get through the tedium of filing countless restraining orders for battered women and to deal with his inability to help the clients in a system that favors those with the money to pay high-priced lawyers, the narrator has spent the past year watching television, taking tranquilizers, and drinking.

When he arrives at work he avoids going into his office, unable to face the five women sitting in the waiting room. He assumes they have all been beaten by their husbands over the weekend. When he finally goes into his office, he learns that his secretary Pauline has died from cancer. Pauline has supported him in his job and has helped him negotiate the bureaucracy. The narrator did not know she was seriously ill. He decides that without Pauline's support he cannot continue in the job.

He leaves the office and heads back to San Francisco. On the drive, he talks to himself and Dr. Serbin. He remembers the time three years before when he was sick for months with mononucleosis. During this time he met a neighbor in his apartment building, Cynthia, who was the sister of his friend Charlie Fisher. Cynthia introduced the narrator to marijuana and LSD. Through Cynthia, he also met a couple, Alice and Ted Casey, a sailor. While he was bedridden, Alice and Cynthia cared for the narrator by bringing him soup. Later he became friends with Ted and Alice, regularly visiting their apartment. The friendship ended when the narrator tested Ted's liberal views on relationships by broaching the subject of his sleeping with Alice while Ted was away on one of his trips. Ted acted as though he was indifferent and that it was Alice's decision but later, through a friend, threatened to cut off the narrator's balls. This ended the friendship.

Returning to the central focus of the narrative, the narrator arrives at Ted Casey's house and rings the bell. No one is home. He then goes to the office of his psychiatrist. Although the psychiatrist is meeting with a patient the narrator bangs on the door. When the psychiatrist opens the door, the narrator tells him he is leaving. The psychiatrist patiently asks him to wait, but the narrator leaves.

Having stopped off to pick up some scotch and now drunk, the narrator goes to Trader JJ's, a San Francisco bar he frequents. He has packed his belongings and plans to store them in the bar's basement. Inside the bar, he talks with a mixed group of misfits who are his friends and form a community. They include Maria, a Jewish bisexual hustler, and Jose, a struggling homosexual artist. The patrons of the bar function by insulting each other. Maria teases the narrator about a former girlfriend, June MacAdoo. The two had dated for three months two years before. Shortly after June unexpectedly dumped the narrator, the narrator found out he failed the bar exam. He studied for three months and retook the exam. This time he passed. He was still heartbroken, however, and was no longer particularly interested in the law.

After leaving some of his belongings at the bar the narrator visits Maryjane and Bertha, two friends. He regards the women as friends, having found he could not sleep with them because of impotence brought on by his broken heart. At their apartment, the narrator finds not only the two women but Ted Casey. Ted is dressed in flashy clothes and is bossing the two, normally strong-willed, women, around. No longer a seaman, he has become a successful drug dealer. The narrator drinks most of a bottle of champagne that has been spiked with mescaline. The four drive-in Ted's Cadillac to an expensive Italian restaurant to eat. At the restaurant, Ted shows off his wealth and his power. The group eats and snorts coke.

After dinner the four drive to Trader JJ's. Maryjane and Ted leave the car but Bertha and the narrator stay behind. The narrator initiates a brief sexual encounter that ends when he quickly cums. Bertha is sympathetic. The two then join the others in the bar. In the bar, the narrator calls June, his ex-girlfriend. At first, she seems interested in seeing him but then tells him she is engaged. The narrator hangs up. More drinking and drunken revelry take place in the bar. The narrator eventually passes out, bringing an end to the day.

=== Chapters 6–11 ===
This section of the story takes place over the course of three days as the narrator drives away from San Francisco. Taking drugs and drinking while he drives, the narrator's thoughts focus on his childhood. He was born in El Paso but grew up from the age of five in Riverbank, a town of fewer than 4,000 people in California's Central Valley. His parents were both Mexican: his father was an “Indio” from Durango and his mother was from a poor family in Juarez. Together they crossed the border illegally to El Paso. His father was drafted into the Navy during WWII and on his discharge was granted citizenship. The family lived in a two-room shack. The father imposed strict discipline and order based on the regulations of the Navy's Seabee Manual.

In the small town of Riverbank, the narrator and his only brother, Bob, were outsiders. As Mexicans, they were picked on by the Okies. Other Mexicans also picked on the brothers because they were more recent immigrants. In addition to the Okies and the Mexicans, the third group in the town was the Americans, the relatively wealthy white families. Among the incidents from childhood, the narrator remembers is a childhood crush. Jane Addison was a new classmate and the daughter of the owner of the factory where the narrator's mom worked. He scratched her initials on the back of his hand as a loving gesture. He was deeply hurt when he showed her the nearly illegible lines, she laughed. Later she told the teacher in front of the class that the narrator stunk.

After driving for two days, the narrator sees a beautiful blond hitchhiker. Karin Wilmington is a rich hippie, on her way from Mexico to Colorado. The narrator recounts his life story to Karin, although he says he is Samoan and that his name is Henry Hawk. This is one of several times in the story where the narrator assumes different identities, one of which is an Indian chief. The narrator and Karin find they have a friend in common, Turk, a crazy biker. The narrator splits up from Karin in Ketchum, Idaho but she leaves him a note inviting him to meet her at her brother's house in nearby Wilmington. In Ketchum, the narrator visits Hemingway's grave.

The narrator continues reflecting on his childhood. In high school, he played clarinet in the school band, was a starter on the variety football team, and was Class President. Yet he never studied and spent most of his time drinking with a group of four friends. The friends also went to a whore house regularly. For over a year the narrator never went with any of the girls. Finally, his friends tricked him into sleeping with Ruby, the very attractive Portuguese madam.

During his Junior year in high school, the narrator fell in love with a Freshman named Alice Brown. Although she walked with a slight limp caused by polio, she was incredibly beautiful and the narrator was instantly attracted to her. The two began seeing each other but when her parents found out about the relationship they made her write the narrator a note saying she could not see him anymore. Alice tells the narrator that her stepfather, a Baptist minister, threatened to divorce Alice's mother if she allowed them to date. This was primarily because her stepfather hated Mexicans.

The narrator and Alice continued seeing each other discreetly. During his senior year, the narrator worked to have Alice crowned school queen. He was successful. At the winter dance where she was crowned, he danced with her; unfortunately, this led to her stepfather finding out about their relationship. When the narrator took her home from the dance the town sheriff was waiting at her house. He had brought the narrator's parents as well. Pressure from the sheriff forces the narrator to agree not to see Alice. However, Alice and the narrator did continue to see each other at school. Occasionally the narrator would have one of his white friends pick up Alice so they could attend a school dance together.

After graduation the narrator, not knowing what else to do and having to wait for Alice to finish high school so they could marry, joined the Air Force. He played in the Air Force band and was stationed at nearby locations in California. For a while, the two continued to see each other whenever the narrator had to leave but eventually he received a Dear John letter from her. During this time, a friend convinced the narrator to convert from Catholicism to the Baptist faith. The narrator adopted the religion enthusiastically. He began leading prayer groups and he impressed members of the local congregation with his ability to testify to sin.

Shortly thereafter, he was transferred to a post in Panama. In his free time, which was considerable, he worked as a missionary to an Indian tribe in a rural village. Gradually, however, his faith waned. He went through the gospels and wrote out a list in favor and a list against what he read. The con list was far longer and the narrator gave up his belief. Afraid of confusing the Indians if he went back on his preaching, he continued giving them sermons on general themes such as brotherly love. After two years in Panama, the narrator was honorably discharged from the Air Force. He went to New Orleans where drank and smoke and briefly considered committing suicide but decided that jumping from a window would be too painful.

In Wilmington, the narrator attends a Fourth of July party at a mansion with the rich friends of Karin. The party features peyote-spiked guacamole. The peyote and the drinking cause the narrator's ulcers to act up. He throws up and is comforted by Karin. She recommends that he continue what she calls “his search” by looking for Bobby Miller at the Daisy Duck bar in Alpine. The narrator says that what he really needs is a doctor to help him with his ulcers. The next day the narrator wakes up on Hemingway's grave. He does not remember how he got there. The section ends with him behind the wheel of his car, heading to Alpine.

=== Chapters 12–15 ===
The events of chapters 12–15 take place over, approximately, a week in Alpine. The narrator arrives in Alpine filled with self-pity. He finds that he has no one to blame and that by some measures he has been successful for someone who started where he did. Nonetheless, he is deeply dissatisfied.

The first thing the narrator does in Alpine is going to a motel and sleep for twenty-four hours. When he wakes up he heads to the Daisy Duck bar to look for Bobby Miller. At the bar, he finds Bobbi, a waitress, who is Bobby's girlfriend. The narrator talks and dances with her. Bobbi then introduces the narrator to Bobby and a man called the King, who has just come into the bar. The narrator is struck by Bobby's calm and gentle disposition. King on the other hand is a rough biker, who makes threatening remarks about running greasers out of town. Miller invites the narrator to crash at his place but the narrator decides to stay in the motel.

The narrator continues describing his life story. After his discharge from the Air Force, the narrator returned to Riverbank. He discovered that his brother had stolen all of his savings from a joint bank account. The narrator decided to attend a local community college. There he was influenced deeply by a creative writing professor, Doc Jennings. Doc Jennings encouraged the students to think for themselves and not to blindly accept conventional wisdom. At one point, the teacher called the narrator to his office to encourage him to leave school if he wants to be a writer. After a year of classes, the narrator finally took Doc Jennings's advice and left school. He went to Los Angeles and took the exam to enter the police department.

While driving in Los Angeles, the narrator was pulled over by an unmarked police car. The narrator, who was drunk, tried to drive away. Eventually, he was stopped by a roadblock. When the case came to court the narrator refused the public defender and decided to represent himself. Several judges tried to talk him out of going to trial. The narrator went ahead with the case and was able to convince the jury that he was not guilty because the police car was unmarked, and, therefore, it was natural for someone who grew up in a rough area to try to flee.

Immediately after the trial, the narrator went looking for his friend Al. He learned from the landlord that Al had been on a drinking binge for a full month. The narrator found Al passed out in his apartment. The floor was covered with eggshells; apparently, the only type of food Al had been eating. The narrator took Al to the county hospital but they would not admit him because he was drunk. Then the narrator took to Al to a psychiatric hospital next door. There the narrator had to convince the admitting doctor that Al was insane in order to have him admitted. During the observation period, Al's sister visited but she sneaked past the nurse when she came in. This caused the doctors to think Al was imagining he had visitors. As a result, Al had to serve two months in a criminal psychiatric hospital. The incident with Al and his arrest convinced the narrator to leave Los Angeles. The narrator went to San Francisco and enrolled at San Francisco State to study math and creative writing.

The narrator wrote a manuscript about his relationship with Alice and the fights between Mexicans and Oakies in his hometown. The narrator showed the manuscript to a supportive creative writing professor. The professor thought highly of the work but said that no one would publish a book about Mexicans. Giving up on writing, the narrator decided to go to law school. He attended night classes at San Francisco Law School and worked during the day as a copy boy at a newspaper. After five years he graduated from law school.

Shortly after arriving in Alpine, the narrator crashed his car. He had been smoking marijuana that Scott, a friend of Bobby, had brought from India. He had also mistakenly taken two tabs of acid that were in an aspirin bottle. When the narrator comes off his trip, he finds he is in King's basement. Exploring the basement, he finds some recording equipment and drugs. He takes the drugs and listens to music. When he comes to, he is sitting with King on the porch. King tells him the sheriff is looking for him. The narrator and King strike up a friendship. Both are serious about drinking. After talking and drinking for a while, the two head to town for more beer in spite of the risk of being spotted by the sheriff.

After picking up more beer at the local grocery store, they head to a park where a group of hippies are gathering after a protest at the house of Gene McNamara. At the gathering, the narrator gets into an altercation because the hippies think he is hassling a pair of nuns. Although the narrator does not know it, someone has written: “Fuck the Pope” on his back.

King takes the narrator to the bus station. While waiting for the bus to leave, King and the narrator continue talking. They have become friends and exchange symbolic gifts. Just before the bus leaves and King gives the narrator his phone number.

=== Chapter 16 ===
The final section, while comprising relatively few pages, covers a longer period than the other sections. The section is also different in that for the most part it does not contain flashbacks to previous events in the narrator's life. The section begins with the narrator stepping off the bus in Vail. Broke, he works in a series of low-paying jobs, repeatedly getting fired. In his free time he drinks, reads Dylan Thomas, reads Konrad Lorenz, and listens to Bob Dylan.

After several months in Vail, he decides to return to El Paso, where he was born, “to see if I could find the object of my quest.” In El Paso, he visits his old house and walks around his old neighborhood. Overcome by memories and sadness, he decides to go across the border to Juarez. In Juarez, he is moved to see so many Mexicans with their brown skin and, most of all, people speaking Spanish openly in public. He remembers an incident in elementary school when the principal told him and his brother they could not speak Spanish at school. For the first time in his life, he is attracted to Mexican women. His earlier loves fade to distant memories in the presence of so many beautiful brown-skinned women.

The narrator goes to a bar, which he observes is the same as any bar in any city in the United States. In the bar, he meets two prostitutes and spends a week with them, eating, drinking, and having sex, until his money runs out. The narrator gets into an argument with a clerk at the hotel after complaining about the lack of heat in his room. He winds up in jail. When he is brought before the judge he tries to explain in his broken Spanish that he is an attorney from the United States. The female judge lectures him on the behavior of Americans coming across the border to sleep with prostitutes and on his inability to speak proper Spanish. He accepts a fine and is allowed to leave. Feeling neither Mexican nor American the narrator heads back across the border. He does not have any papers but manages to convince the border guard that he is an American citizen.

Across the border, he pawns his few belongings and calls his brother. His brother tells him about the La Raza movement taking shape in East L.A. In a flash, the narrator sees this as his destiny. He immediately decides to head for Los Angeles. He imagines that he will call a meeting and becomes an organizer; he will start a movement of Brown Buffalos. After years of searching for an identity, he feels he has finally found his place. The story ends with the narrator arriving in Los Angeles, ready to become a revolutionary activist.
