= Distinction (sociology) =

Social force that assigns different values upon different people within a given society

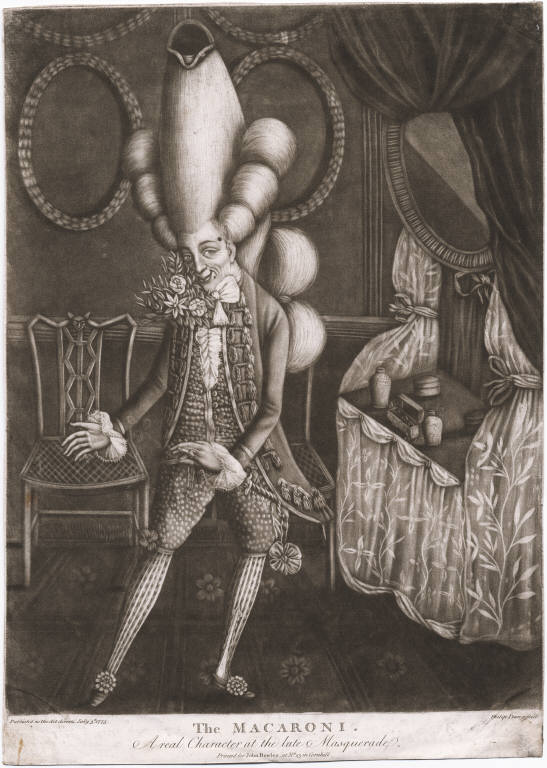
In the 18th-century, macaronis distinguished their wealth by excessive mentions of their travels, trendy fashions, and unusually sentimental behavior.

In sociology, distinction is a social force whereby people use various strategies—consciously or not—to differentiate and distance themselves from others in society, and to assign themselves greater value in the process. In Distinction: A Social Critique of the Judgement of Taste (La Distinction, 1979), Pierre Bourdieu described how those in power define aesthetic concepts like "good taste", with the consequence that the social class of a person tends to predict and in fact determine his or her cultural interests, likes, and dislikes.

Political and socio-economic, racial and gender distinctions, based upon social class, are reinforced in daily life within society. In The Rebel Sell: Why the Culture Can't be Jammed (2004), Joseph Heath and Andrew Potter describe "distinction" as a social competition in which the styles of social fashion are in continual development, and that the men and women who do not follow the development of social trends soon become stale, and irrelevant to their social-class stratum.

== Cultural distinction ==
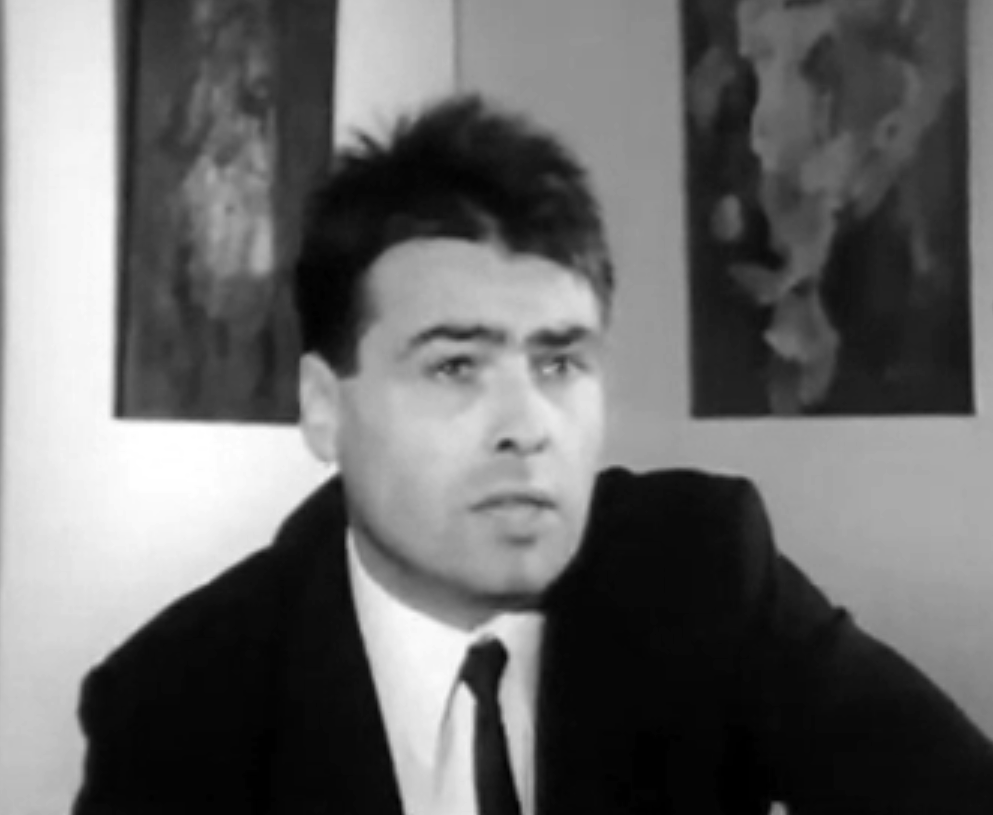
Sociologist Pierre Bourdieu, 1969.

Cultural distinction is expanded with the concept of cultural capital, which are the social assets of a person, and a key element of outward display of power or lack thereof.

Bourdieu proposes that those with a high volume of cultural capital – non-financial social assets, such as education, which promote social mobility beyond economic means – are most likely to be able to determine what constitutes taste within society. Those with lower volumes of overall capital accept this taste, and the distinction of high and low culture, as legitimate and natural, and thus accept existing restrictions on conversion between the various forms of capital (economic, social, cultural). Those with low overall capital are unable to access a higher volume of cultural capital because they lack the necessary means to do so. This could mean lacking the terminology to describe or methods of understanding classical artwork, due to features of their habitus, for example. The acceptance of 'dominant' forms of taste is, Bourdieu argues, a form of 'symbolic violence'. That is, the naturalization of this distinction of taste and its misrecognition as necessary denies the dominated classes the means of defining their own world, which leads to the disadvantage of those with less overall capital. Moreover, that even when the subordinate social classes might seem to have their own ideas about what is and what is not good taste, "the working-class ‘aesthetic’ is a dominated aesthetic, which is constantly obliged to define itself in terms of the dominant aesthetics" of the ruling class.

Bourdieu discussed an objectified cultural capital, where the visual aesthetic of people or objects is more important than the inner-meaning. Bourdieu argues that pictures that are not attractive become appealing because of the high levels of cultural capital. Giselinde Kuipers evaluated physical looks among four European countries. Her study found the relationship of social position and beauty for males was weakest, but for females was highest. This study reflected Bourdieu’s aesthetic disposition because Kuiper found that young and educated people are attracted to an original beauty. Kuipers’ research presents evidence of cultural capital being more transmissible. Such examples being younger generations having different aesthetic styles into traditional culture.

== Legal distinction ==
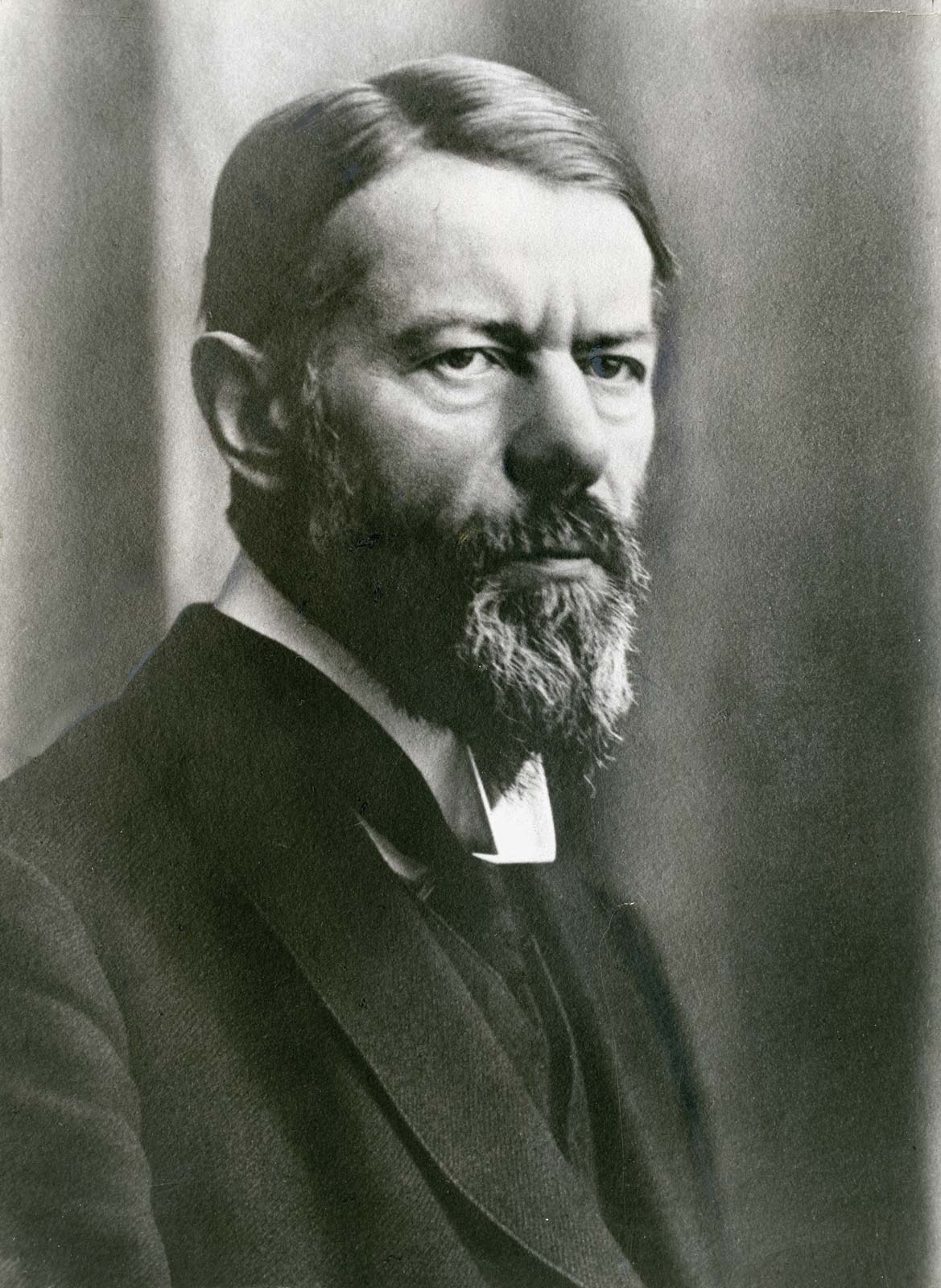
Sociologist Max Weber

Distinctions of legal societies, being internal and external perspectives, play a role on the way law communities are viewed. Legal distinction’s position in society is determined by a variety of factors such as culture, ideology, politics, economics, science, education and technology.

Sociologist Max Weber uses assessment of value judgments against socio-scholars. Sociology scholars, in law, are commonly viewed as fixers of law policies who give important guidance to the law makers. Weber argues that socio-scholars have to show passion for any value among society.

Law and morals should be separated according to the separation thesis. This thesis is criticized by many sociologists due to systems being separated from normative systems in society. Distinction in legal and social science is shown to be different from the normative order.

Roger Cotterrell argues law is made up of a communal network and the operations within are determined by intrinsic values. In Cotterrell’s argument, he concludes a dualistic view of law being symbolic and instrumental by socio-legal theory instead of legal theory to determine legal normativity.

== Military distinction ==
Military distinction deals with the roles of military personnel and society. Various differing roles in many countries could change the distinction military perceives to society.

Task changes in the military has changed the view on society for the role that is established. Soldiers are viewed as peacekeepers and identify with this role while also being in the role of a warrior. Terrorism is another factor that plays a role on military and their perception by society. Terrorism is a major threat that military deal with and are not typically tasks of police forces. Society sees the structural position of the military to be separate from police forces.

Civil-military divide influences roles of work force and military organization. The two groups interact by social, cultural, and educational differences. Roles are defined by relationships between military personnel and citizen-soldiers. Social actors, like threats to environment, cause tensions that could be brought into discussion for differing sectors of military.
