= Tax Freedom Day =

Measure of a country's overall tax burden

In the US, the tax burden surged in the 20th century but abated in the 21st century.

Tax Freedom Day is a concept developed and trademarked by American businessman Dallas Hostetler, which aims to calculate the first day of the year on which a nation as a whole has theoretically earned enough income to pay its taxes. Every dollar that is officially considered income by the government is counted, and every payment to the government that is officially considered a tax is counted. Taxes at all levels of government – local, state and federal – are included.

== History and methodology ==
The concept of Tax Freedom Day was developed in 1948 by Florida businessman Dallas Hostetler, who trademarked the phrase "Tax Freedom Day" and calculated it each year for the next two decades. In 1971, Hostetler retired and transferred the trademark to the Tax Foundation.

== United States ==
In the United States, the "Tax Freedom Day" is annually calculated by the Tax Foundation, a Washington, D.C.–based think tank. Their results are as follows:

Tax Freedom Days in the U.S. since 1900:
Year	Tax Freedom Day	Tax Burden
1900	January 22	5.9%
1910	January 19	5.0%
1920	February 13	12.0%
1930	February 12	11.7%
1940	March 7	17.9%
1950	March 31	24.6%
1960	April 11	27.7%
1970	April 19	29.6%
1980	April 21	30.4%
1990	April 21	30.4%
2000	May 1	33.0%
2010	April 9	26.9%
2011	April 12	27.7%
2012	April 13	29.2%
2013	April 18	29.4%
2014	April 21	30.2%
2015	April 24	31.2%
2016	April 22	30.9%
2017	April 23	30.9%
2018	April 19	29.7%
2019	April 16	29.0%

== Around the world ==
Many other companies and organizations in countries throughout the world now produce their own "Tax Freedom Day" analysis. According to the Tax Foundation, Tax Freedom Day reports are currently being published in eight countries. Due to the different ways that nations collect and categorize public finance data, however, Tax Freedom Days are not necessarily directly comparable from one country to another.

Tax Freedom Days for countries by date
Country	Day of year	% burden	Date of year	Updated	Source	Ref.
Switzerland	121	33%	May 1	2015	Deloitte	
India	74	20%	March 14	2000	Centre for Civil Society	
Australia	110	29%	April 20	2024	Centre for Independent Studies	
United States	114	31%	April 24	2015	Tax Foundation	
Estonia	114	31%	April 24	2007	Eesti Maksumaksjate Liit (Estonian Taxpayers Association)	
Lithuania	128	35%	May 15	2015	Lithuanian Free Market Institute	
Spain	181	50%	June 30	2016	Foundation for the Advancement of Liberty and Spanish Taxpayers' Union	
Uruguay	133	39%	May 13	2010	CPA Ferrere	
Hungary	140	38%^{*}	May 20	2008	Hungarian Central Statistic Institute	
New Zealand	127	35%*	May 7	2018	Staples Rodway	
South Africa	141	39%	May 22	2014	Free Market Foundation	
Bulgaria	124	36%	May 4	2018	Radio Bulgaria	
United Kingdom	161	41%	June 10	2024	Adam Smith Institute	
Brazil	153	41%	May 31	2014	Instituto Brasileiro de Planejamento Tributario	
Slovakia	155	42%	June 5	2017	Nadácia F.A.Hayeka	
Canada	164	45%	June 14	2019	Fraser Institute	
Belarus	135	37%	May 15	2016	The Public Association «Discussion and Analytical Society Liberal Club»	
Croatia	161	44%	June 10	2010	Adriatic Institute for Public Policy	
Czech Republic	152	42 %	June 1	2025	Liberální institut	
Slovenia	164	37%	June 13	2015	Svetilnik	
Belgium	218	54%	August 6	2018	Institut économique Molinari (IEM)	
Greece	169	46%	June 19	2012	Φορολογικό Παρατηρητήριο, Κέντρο Φιλελεύθερων Μελετών – Μάρκος Δραγούμης	
Poland	156	43%	June 6	2018	Centrum im. Adama Smitha	
Germany	192	52%	July 11	2015	Bund der Steuerzahler	
Israel	197	54%	July 14	2013	Jerusalem Institute for Market Studies	
Turkey	194	53%	July 14	2012	Liberal Democratic Party	
Norway	210	57%	July 29	2007	Skattebetalerforeningen	
France	208	57%	July 27	2018	Institut économique Molinari (IEM)	
Bosnia and Herzegovina	161	44%	June 10	2017	Centre for Policy and Governance «Centar za politike i upravljanje»	
Austria	216	59%	August 5	2019	Austrian Economics Center	
Italy	153	42%	June 2	2018	CGIA	
Mexico	177	48.6%	June 25	2024	Caminos de la Libertad	

=== European Union ===
A 2010 study published in L'Anglophone, a Brussels newspaper, compared the tax burdens of "Average Joes" in each of the 27 EU member states and projected the Tax Freedom Day for workers earning a typical wage. Income taxes, social security contributions (by the employee and the employer) and projected VAT contributions were included in the calculations.

Regarding the discrepancy between their calculation of August 3 as the typical Belgian worker's Tax Freedom Day and that of PriceWaterhouseCoopers (PWC), L'Anglophone's authors wrote:

[PWC's] figures count revenue from all taxes (including those on corporate profits, petrol, cigarettes, &c.) and thus present a more complete picture of the country’s total tax burden," adding that it is "an average applied to all Belgians – not all Belgian workers; in 2008, less than half of Belgium’s population (4.99 million working out of 10.67 million citizens) was legally working. Consequently, a huge share of Belgium’s tax burden is borne by the working population.

2010 Tax Freedom Days for the "Average Joe" in the European Union, as published in L'Anglophone
Country	Day of year	% burden	Date of year
Austria	191	52%	July 10
Belgium	215	59%	August 3
Bulgaria	145	40%	May 25
Cyprus	72	19%	March 13
Czech Rep.	165	45%	June 14
Denmark	168	46%	June 17
Estonia	150	41%	May 30
Finland	166	45%	June 15
France	207	56%	July 26
Germany	200	55%	July 19
Greece	164	45%	June 13
Hungary	218	59%	August 6
Ireland	117	32%	April 27
Italy	169	46%	June 18
Latvia	161	44%	June 10
Lithuania	167	45%	May 20
Luxembourg	135	37%	May 15
Malta	99	27%	April 9
Netherlands	184	50%	July 3
Poland	160	44%	June 9
Portugal	150	41%	May 30
Romania	178	49%	June 27
Slovakia	167	46%	June 16
Slovenia	164	45%	June 13
Spain	136	37%	May 16
Sweden	181	49%	June 30
United Kingdom	134	36%	May 13

== Criticism ==
In the book Filthy Lucre: Economics for People Who Hate Capitalism, philosopher Joseph Heath criticizes the idea that tax-paying is inherently different from consumption:

It would make just as much sense to declare an annual "mortgage freedom day", in order to let mortgage owners know what day they "stop working for the bank and start working for themselves". ...But who cares? Homeowners are not really "working for the bank"; they're merely financing their own consumption. After all, they're the ones living in the house, not the bank manager.

=== Mathematical ===
For Canada, the Fraser Institute also includes a "Personal Tax Freedom Day Calculator" that estimates a customized Tax Freedom Day based on additional variables such as age of household head, sex of household head, marital status and number of children. However, the Fraser Institute's figures have been disputed. For example, a 2005 study by Osgoode Hall Law Professor Neil Brooks argued that the Fraser Institute's Tax Freedom Day analysis includes flawed accounting, including the exclusion of several important forms of income and overstating tax figures, moving the date nearly two months later.

In America, while Tax Freedom Day presents an "average American" tax burden, it is not a tax burden typical for an American. That is, the tax burdens of most Americans are substantially overstated by Tax Freedom Day. The larger tax bills associated with higher incomes increases the average tax burden above that of most Americans.

The Tax Foundation defends its methodology by pointing out that Tax Freedom Day is the U.S. economy's overall average tax burden—not the tax burden of the "average" American, which is how it is often misinterpreted by members of the media. Tax Foundation materials do not use the phrase "tax burden of the average American", although members of the media often make this mistake.

Another criticism is that the calculation includes capital gains taxes but not capital gains income, thus overstating the tax burden. For example, in the late 1990s the US Tax Freedom Day moved later, reaching its latest date ever in 2000, but this was largely due to capital gains taxes on the bull market of that era rather than an increase in tax rates. In other words, variations in capital gains income and their associated taxes cause changes in the amount of taxes, but not in the income used in the calculation of Tax Freedom Day.

The Tax Foundation argues that the Tax Freedom Day calculation does not include capital gains as income because it uses income and tax data directly from the Bureau of Economic Analysis (BEA). BEA has never counted capital gains as income since they don't represent current production available to pay taxes, and so the Tax Foundation excludes them as well. Additionally, the Tax Foundation argues that the exclusion of capital gains income is irrelevant in most years since including capital gains would only shift Tax Freedom Day by 1 percent in either direction in most years. A 1 percent change would represent 3.65 days. From 1968 to 2019 the date has never left the 21-day range of April 13 to May 3.

== See also ==
- Earth Overshoot Day
- Equal Pay Day
- Government spending
- Laffer curve
- List of countries by tax rates
- List of countries by tax revenue as percentage of GDP
- Rahn curve
