= Iria ceremony =

Nigerian festival

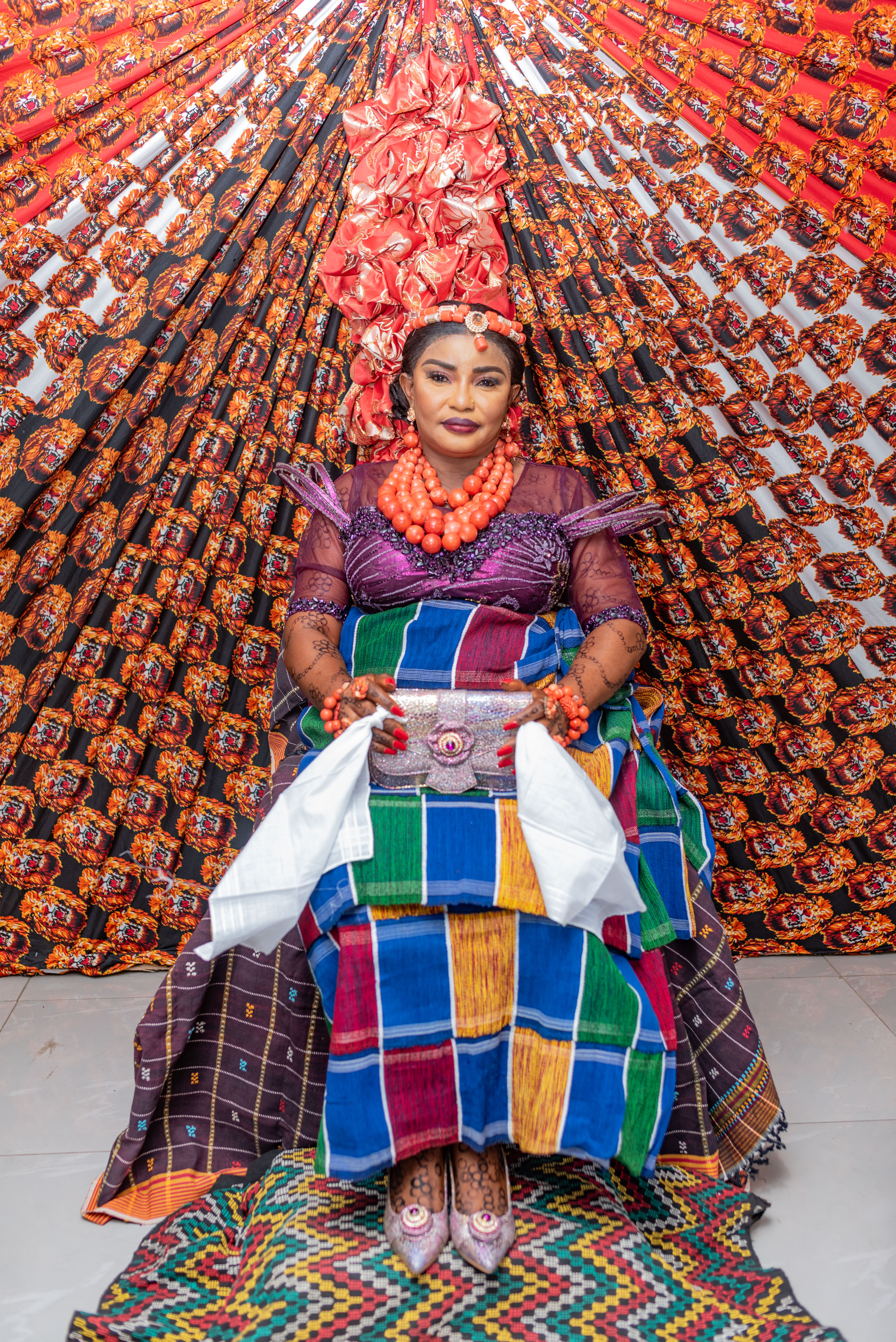
- Iriabo Stella Obomanu Womanhood Celebration
- Language: Ibani Ijaw

Origin
- Meaning: Womanhood Celebration
- Region of origin: Ibani Ijaw Region, Nigeria

Egeribite & Bibite Womanhood Celebration of Opobo Kingdom

The Iria ceremony is a festival celebrated by the Ijaw ethnic group in Rivers State, Nigeria. It is a significant cultural event that marks the transition of a woman from one stage of womanhood to another within the Ijaw community. The festival is primarily observed in the Ibani kingdoms located in the Bonny and Opobo-Nkoro Local Government Areas of Rivers State.

The first stage of the Iria ceremony is considered a rite of passage for young girls as they reach puberty and begin to mature physically. Prior to this stage, a girl child runs naked around the neighborhood, but once she reaches the age of puberty, her parents acquire a wrapper for her. The presentation of this wrapper to the girl marks a special day, and is celebrated with great enthusiasm. An Iria initiate is referred to in the Ibani language as an Iriabo.

The festival consists of three stages, each corresponding to different age groups. If any of the prior stages haven't been performed by a prospective initiate to the final Bibite stage, as sometimes occurs, they will each be done before proceeding to it:

1. Kala-Egerebite: The Kala-Egerebite stage is designated for girls aged between 12 and 15. On the day of the ceremony, the girls wear a single wrapper known as SUU on their chest, along with light beads as adornments.
2. Opu-Egerebite: This stage is meant for young ladies aged between 18 and 21, as well as those slightly older. During the Opu-Egerebite ceremony, the young women tie a waist wrapper called Ikaki, along with popo and damask fabrics, paired with matching blouses.
3. Bibite: The Bibite stage is reserved for women aged 40 and above. In this stage, the women wear traditional garments such as the intorica George wrapper and the lili-inji wrapper. The Bibite stage holds the highest level of honour and respect within the Iria ceremony in Bonny and Opobo, and it receives special attention and reverence.

== See more ==
- List of Festival in Nigeria
- Culture of Nigeria

== Gallery ==
Iriabo Womanhood Celebration

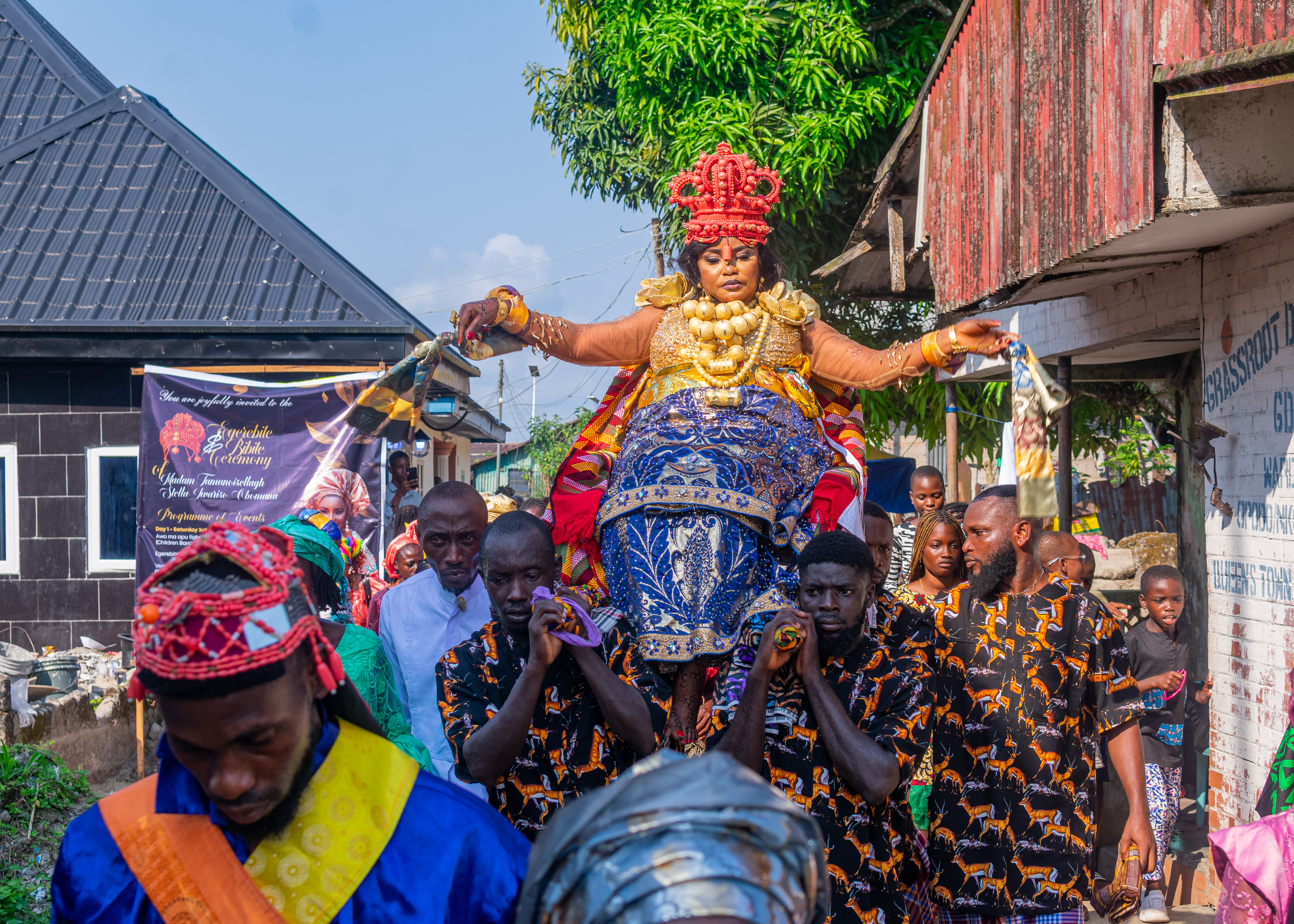
Iriabo Stella Obomanu Womanhood Celebration

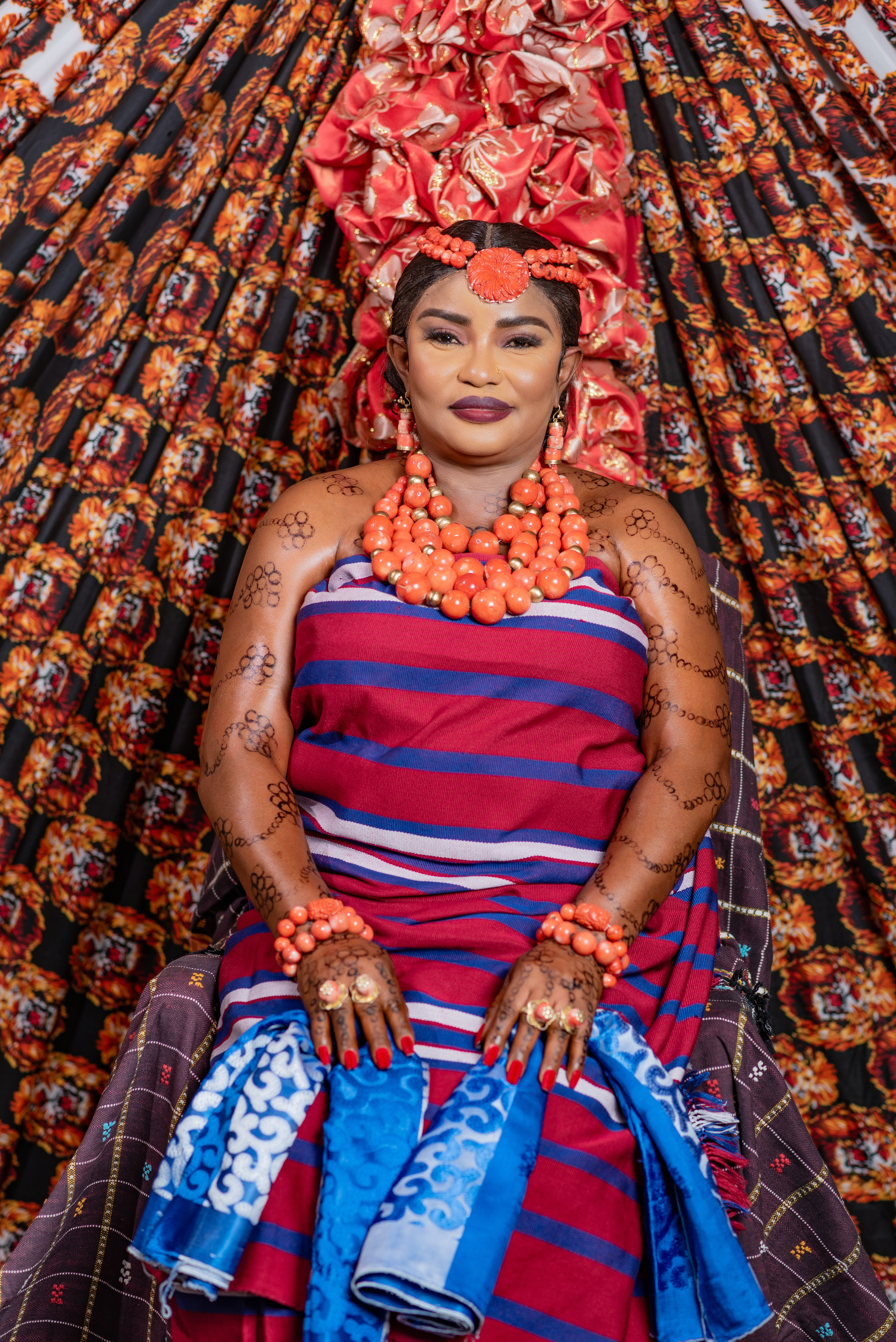
Iriabo Stella Obomanu Womanhood Celebration

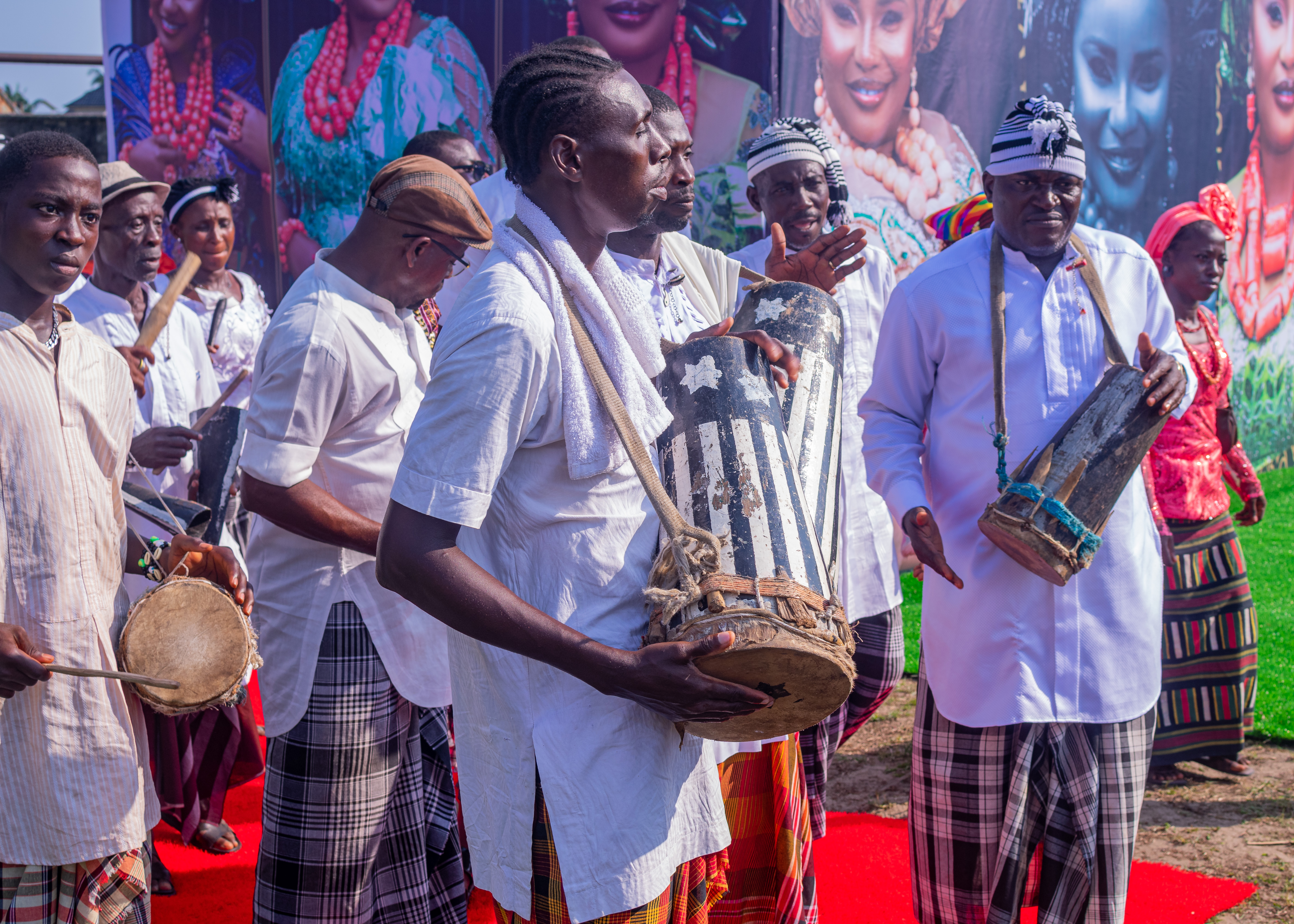
Iriabo Stella Obomanu Womanhood Celebration

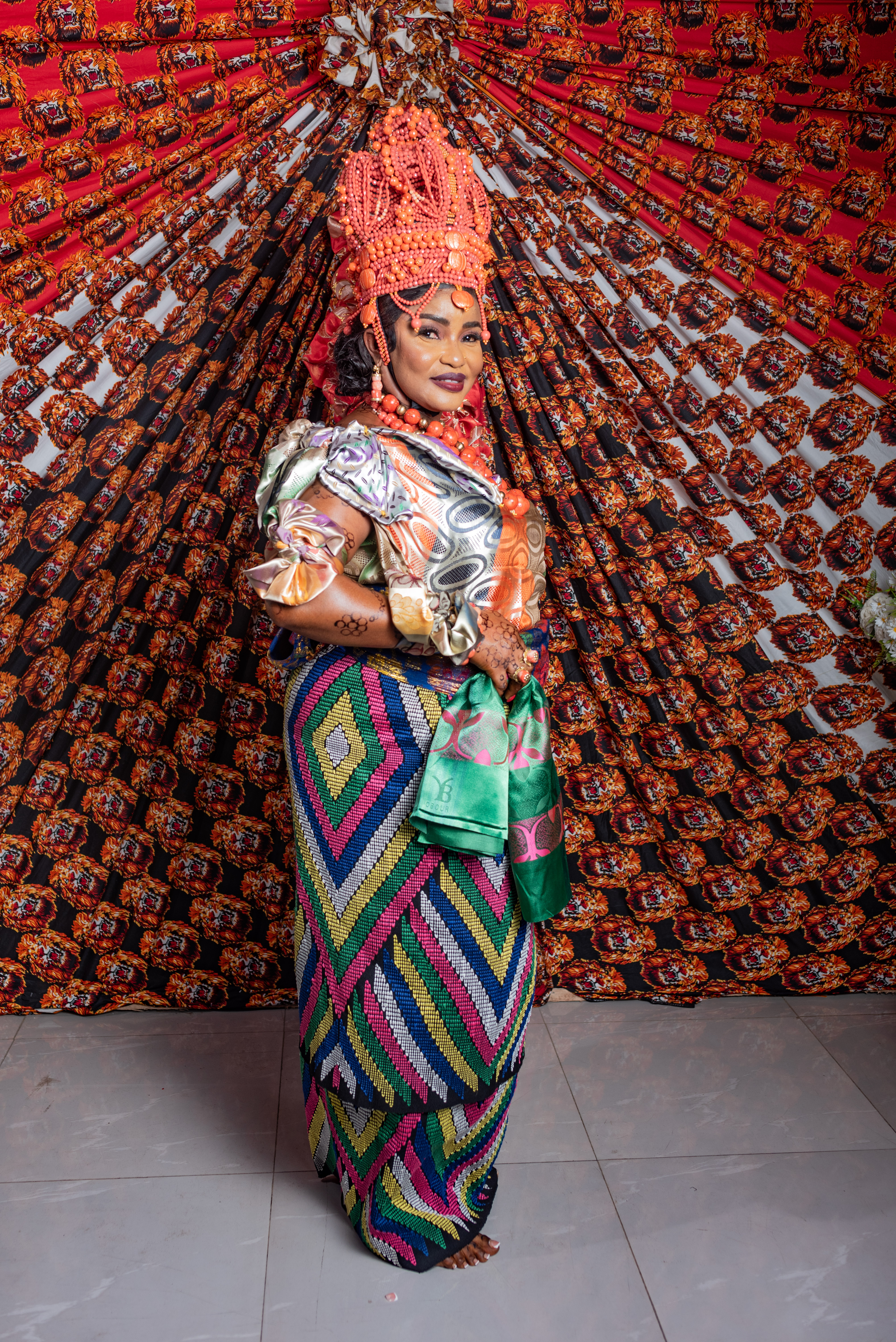
Iriabo Stella Obomanu Womanhood Celebration

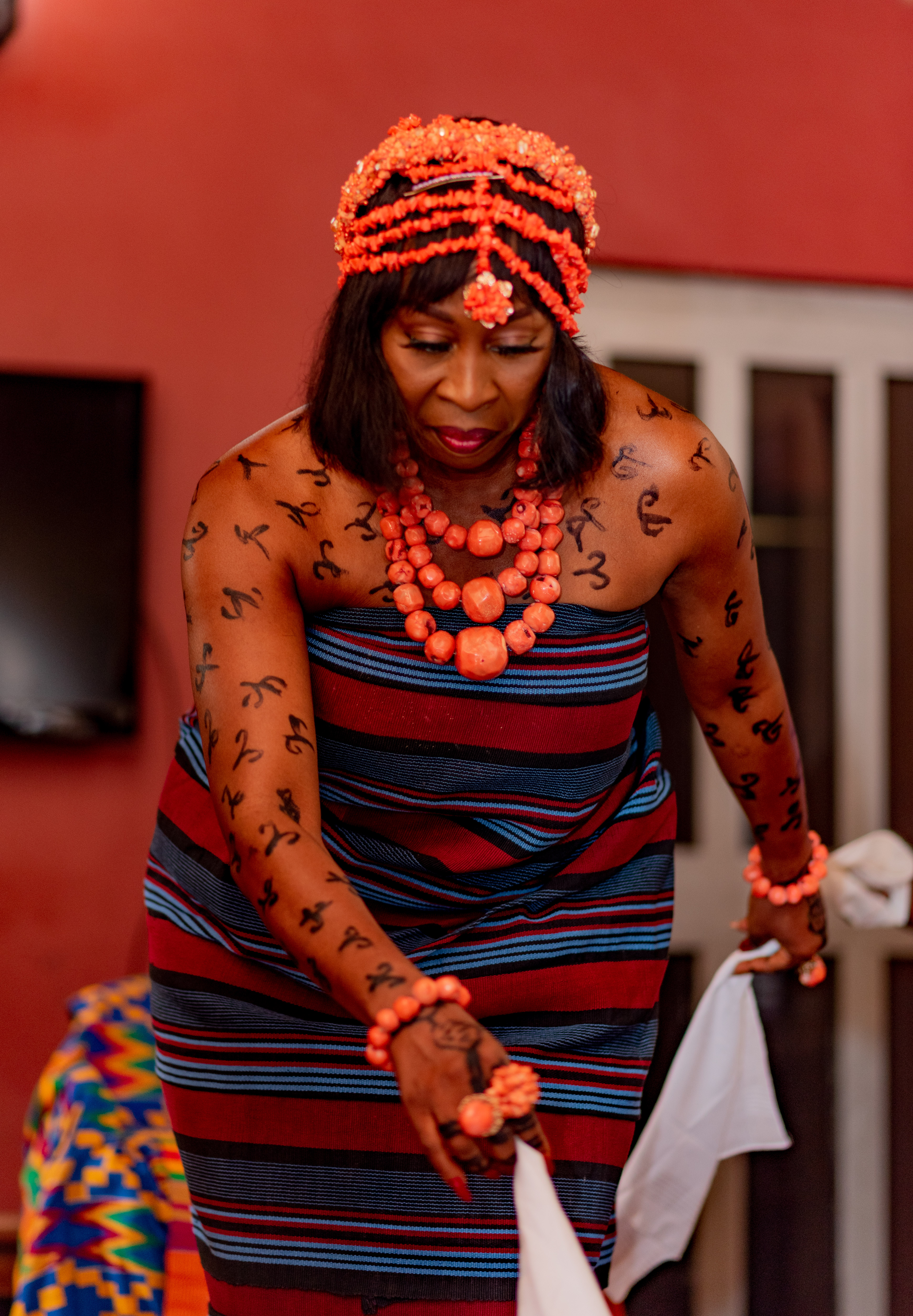
An older Iriabo, or initiate of the Iria ceremony, engaging in a ceremonial dance.

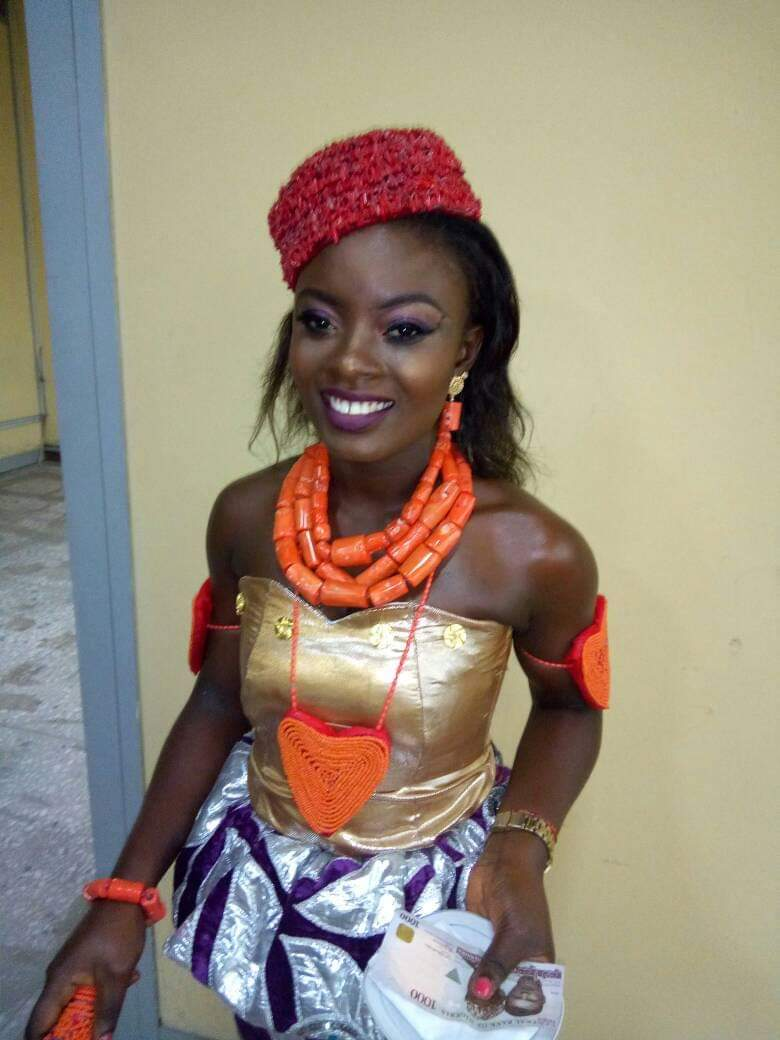
A young Iriabo.
