= Towell =

Towell is a surname. Notable people with the surname include:

- C. Towell (MCC cricketer) (active in late 18th century)
- David Towell (1937–2003), Nevada politician
- Larry Towell (born 1953), photographer
- Richie Towell (born 1991), Irish footballer

== See also ==
- Towel, material for drying
