= Joseph Heath =

Canadian philosopher

Joseph Heath FRSC
- Born: 1967 (age 58–59); Saskatoon, Saskatchewan, Canada
- Relatives: June Clark (stepmother)

Education
- Education: McGill University (BA); Northwestern University (MA, PhD)
- Thesis: Morality and Social Action (1995)
- Doctoral advisor: Thomas A. McCarthy

Philosophical work
- Institutions: Université de Montréal University of Toronto
- Language: English
- Notable works: The Efficient Society (2001); The Rebel Sell (2004); Filthy Lucre: Economics for People Who Hate Capitalism (2009); The Machinery of Government (2020)
- Notable ideas: Market failures approach to business ethics

Joseph Heath FRSC (born 1967) is a Canadian philosopher. He is professor of philosophy at the University of Toronto, where he was formerly the director of the Centre for Ethics. He has also taught at the Munk School of Global Affairs and Public Policy. According to his webpage at the University of Toronto, Heath's work "is all related, in one way or another, to critical social theory in the tradition of the Frankfurt School." His primary areas of specialization are political philosophy, business ethics, critical theory, and rational choice theory.

After earning his doctorate in philosophy from Northwestern University, Heath was a professor of philosophy at the Université de Montréal from 2001 to 2003. He has taught at the University of Toronto since 2003.

Heath is known for his work on practical rationality, philosophy and economics, and his development of the market failures approach to business ethics. His popular works include the bestselling The Rebel Sell, coauthored with Andrew Potter.

== Early life and education ==
Heath was born in Saskatoon, Saskatchewan in 1967. His father was Terrence Heath, a historian, writer, and arts administrator who was professor of history at the University of Saskatchewan. He attended the École St. Paul School and Nutana Collegiate.

Heath graduated from McGill University with a Bachelor of Arts in philosophy in 1990. As an undergraduate, he studied under the philosophers Charles Taylor and James Tully. Heath earned a MA in philosophy in 1994 and a PhD in philosophy in 1995 from Northwestern University, where he studied under Thomas A. McCarthy, who advised his doctoral thesis, and Jürgen Habermas.

== Academic career ==
Heath taught at Erindale College at the University of Toronto from 1996 to 2001, and at the Université de Montréal from 2001 to 2003 as Canada Research Chair in Ethics and Political Economy. At the Université de Montréal, he was a founding member of the Centre de recherche en éthique de l'Université de Montréal (CREUM). He has taught at University College at the University of Toronto since 2009.

Heath was elected Fellow of the Royal Society of Canada in 2013. He has held fellowships from the Pierre Elliott Trudeau Foundation and the National Research Council Canada. His popular book Enlightenment 2.0 won the Shaughnessy Cohen Prize for Political Writing in 2014. His book The Machinery of Government won the Donner Prize for Best Book on Public Policy in 2020.

== Philosophical work ==
=== Critique of counterculture ===
The central claim of The Rebel Sell is that counter-cultural movements have failed and that they all share a common fatal error in the way they understand society; hence, counter-culture is not a threat to "the system".

=== Market failures approach to business ethics ===
Heath advances the "market failures" or "Paretian" approach to business ethics which states that "the market is essentially a staged competition, designed to promote Pareto efficiency, and in cases where the explicit rules governing the competition are insufficient to secure the class of favoured outcomes, economic actors should respect the spirit of these rules and refrain from pursuing strategies that run contrary to the point of the competition". The approach is neither akin to the shareholder theory, the stakeholder theory, or a personal ethics framework.

Heath's market failures approach follows from his work in political economy. According to Heath, the market is not a system of natural justice. Instead, it is an imperfect but efficient institutional arrangement designed to maximize social welfare by way of an unresolved collective action problem. In other words, markets are "special-purpose institutions designed to promote efficiency", that need to be "embedded within the broader context of a welfare state, which engages in both market-complementing and redistributive policies to claim to be just."

Since these structured competitions are implemented "for the narrow reason" that, in a reasonably competitive market, they generate social benefits through positive externalities, "adversarial ethics" are acceptable in the circumscribed and limited role of markets. Indeed, economic actors engaged in market transactions "must be given a fairly broad exemption from the norms of equality or fairness".

However, they must be held accountable to the fundamental principles required for a competitive and efficiency-promoting market. Therefore, "the central role of business ethics is […] not to bring in 'outside' moral considerations to condemn the latest outrage, but to clarify and to correct the self-understanding of participants in the market economy […]. In order to do so, it has no need to appeal to normative standards beyond those that are already implicit in the institutions of a market economy."

Hence, "the overall set of profit-maximizing strategies is partitioned into three categories, separating out the immoral and the illegal strategies from the normatively acceptable ones. The efficiency standard can be used to make both cuts. The 'acceptable/unacceptable' distinction is imposed by the efficiency properties of the market system as a whole. The set of unacceptable strategies can then be subdivided into 'immoral/illegal' using a transaction cost or regulatory cost analysis." In other words, the "basic thrust of 'business ethics' is […] to discourage firms from taking advantage of market imperfections, even in cases where legal regulation is not feasible."

Thus, "the firm should behave as though market conditions were perfectly competitive, even though they may not in fact be. The following list of imperatives provides some examples of the restrictions that this would imply :

1. Minimize negative externalities
2. Compete only through price and quality
3. Reduce information asymmetries between firm and customers
4. Do not exploit diffusion of ownership
5. Avoid erecting barriers to entry
6. Do not use cross-subsidization to eliminate competitors
7. Do not oppose regulation aimed at correcting market imperfections
8. Do not seek tariffs or other protectionist measures
9. Treat price levels as exogenously determined
10. Do not engage in opportunistic behaviour toward customers or others firms"

=== "Public-economic" normative model of the welfare state ===
Heath advocates the "public-economic" normative model of the welfare state, that is to say, a normative standard of the appropriate division of labor between the public and the private sector, as superior to the "redistributive" or "Communitarianism" models. According to Heath, the "public-economic" normative model "provides both the best theoretical reconstruction of the existing configuration of welfare state services, as well as the most useful set of principles to guide any proposed expansion or modification of these services."

Heath describes the three models as such: "The three normative purposes most commonly cited as providing a justification for the scope of welfare state activity are equality, community, or efficiency. These give rise to a corresponding set of models, which I refer to as the redistributive, the communitarian, and the public-economic models of the welfare state. The first sees the central function of the welfare state to be the redistribution of resources, with the goal of making the outcomes produced by the market economy less unequal. The second considers the central problem, central function of the welfare state to be that of imposing limits on the scope of the market, in order to resist the commodification of certain domains of interaction. The last model regards the welfare state as playing a role essentially complementary to that of the market. According to this view, the welfare state corrects market failure, either through regulation, subsidization and taxation, or the direct provision of goods and services."

Heath further explains the "public-economic" model this way: "The “classical liberal” state creates the market economy through the institution of property rights and civil contract. The “welfare state” then emerges in those areas where liberal markets fail to produce optimal outcomes. This can take the form of regulatory agencies (in cases where the rules of marketplace competition need to be adjusted), state-owned enterprises (typically in sectors where efficient competition cannot be organized), and public services (in cases where a system of effective property rights cannot be instituted, or where the transaction costs associated with a system of voluntary exchange would be prohibitive). According to this view, the welfare state essentially does the same thing as the market – both are in the business of enabling mutually beneficial forms of cooperation to emerge – it merely organizes the transactions under somewhat different terms. [...] The economic model of the welfare state should therefore be interpreted as the view that the state should strive to resolve collective action problems in cases where it can do so more efficiently than other institutional forms." Heath advances that this model has "considerable explanatory power" for these state activities: 1) control of natural monopolies, 2) control of imperfections in existing markets, 3) public provision, 4) the social safety net, 5) minority public goods and 6) governance failures.

Heath notes that "there is nothing incoherent about a hybrid “redistribution and public goods” view of the welfare state. However, the amount of egalitarian redistribution in a typical welfare state is often dramatically overestimated. This is because many theorists treat the social safety net, which is essentially a set of government-run insurance programs, as a system of redistribution, and hence as governed by an egalitarian logic."

== Views ==
In 2021 Heath published an op-ed in the Globe and Mail which argued that the acronym BIPOC is problematic in the Canadian context, suggesting instead the acronym FIVM for "Francophone, Indigenous, and Visible Minority".

== Personal life ==
Heath's stepmother is June Clark.

== Publications ==
=== Popular books ===
- Heath, Joseph The Efficient Society: Why Canada is as Close to Utopia as it Gets Viking, 2001. ISBN 0670891495
- Heath, Joseph & Potter, Andrew The Rebel Sell: Why the Culture Can't be Jammed Capstone, 2005. ISBN 1841126543
- Heath, Joseph Filthy Lucre: Economics for People Who Hate Capitalism HarperCollins, 2009. ISBN 9781554683956. Also published under the title Economics Without Illusions: Debunking the Myths of Modern Capitalism Crown Publishing Group, 2010. ISBN 9780307590596
- Heath, Joseph Enlightenment 2.0: Restoring Sanity to Our Politics, Our Economy, and Our Lives HarperCollins, 2014. ISBN 9781443422529

=== Academic books ===
- Heath, Joseph Communicative Action and Rational Choice MIT, 2003. ISBN 9780262275156
- Heath, Joseph Following the Rules: Practical Reasoning and Deontic Constraint Oxford University Press, 2008. ISBN 9780195370294
- Heath, Joseph Morality, Competition, and The Firm: The Market Failures Approach to Business Ethics Oxford University Press, 2014. ISBN 9780199990481
- Heath, Joseph The Machinery of Government: Public Administration and the Liberal State Oxford University Press, 2020. ISBN 9780197509616
- Heath, Joseph Philosophical Foundations of Climate Change Policy Oxford University Press, 2021. ISBN 9780197567982
- Heath, Joseph Cooperation and Social Justice University of Toronto Press, 2022. ISBN 9781487525958
- Heath, Joseph Ethics for Capitalists: A Systematic Approach to Business Ethics, Competition, and Market Failure FriesenPress, 2023. ISBN 1039173985

=== Selected papers ===
- Heath, Joseph (1997). "Foundationalism and Practical Reason". Mind. 106.
- Heath, Joseph (1996). "Is Language a Game?". Canadian Journal of Philosophy. 26.
- Heath, Joseph (2001). "The Structure of Hip Consumerism". Philosophy and Social Criticism. 27.
- Heath, Joseph (2003). "The Transcendental Necessity of Morality". Philosophy and Phenomenological Research. 67.
- Heath, Joseph (2005). "Dworkin's Auction". Politics, Philosophy and Economics. 3.
- Heath, Joseph (2006). "The Benefits of Cooperation". Philosophy and Public Affairs. 34.
- Heath, Joseph (2009). "Three Evolutionary Precursors to Morality". Dialogue. 48.
- Heath, Joseph (2011). "Three Normative Models of the Welfare State". Public Reason. 3.
- Heath, Joseph (2013). "The Structure of Intergenerational Cooperation". Philosophy and Public Affairs. 41 (1).

=== Blog ===
Heath blogged at In Due Course from 2014 until 2019, and on Substack from 2023.

== Sources ==
- Heath, Joseph (2014). Morality, Competition, and the Firm : The Market Failures Approach to Business Ethics. Oxford University Press.
