= Tim Whiten =

Canadian artist (born 1941)

- Born: Grover Timothy Whiten; August 13, 1941 (age 85); Inkster, Michigan, U.S.
- Education: B.S. from Central Michigan University (1964), and a MFA from the University of Oregon (1966)
- Awards: member, Royal Canadian Academy of Arts; Faculty of Fine Arts Dean's Teaching Award, York University, Toronto (1999/2000)

Grover Timothy Whiten OC RCA (born August 13, 1941) is an American-born Canadian artist who works in the areas of sculpture, drawing, performance art, and multi-media installations, using a wide range of materials. He has also worked as an educator. Whiten, one of Canada's most important contemporary artists, engages with themes of ritual, myth, and alchemy in his work, exploring the transformations inherent in the human experience.

== Biography ==
Tim Whiten was born in Inkster, Michigan, on August 13, 1941. He graduated with a B.S. from Central Michigan University in 1964, and a M.F.A. from the University of Oregon in 1966. During his undergraduate years in CMU's School of Applied Arts and Sciences, he had sought to become a psychologist studying with Dr. Charles P. Poole [via personal correspondence between Dr. Poole's son and Whiten] and Dr. Oscar Oppenheimer. While in the School of Architecture and Allied Arts / Faculty of Graduate Studies at the UofO, he studied with noted Czech sculptor Jan Zach.

In 1968, after completing military service as a commissioned Officer in the U.S. Army, Whiten was successful in his application for a teaching position at York University in Toronto and was appointed to the Faculty of Arts in the Division of the Humanities. In 1970, he became one of the pioneer members of the newly formed Faculty of Fine Arts, having been appointed to the new faculty in the Department of Visual Arts with a cross-appointment to the Faculty of Arts. He served as Chair of the Department of Visual Arts between 1984 and 1986. In 2007, with 39 years of teaching at York University, long after having achieved the rank of Full Professor, he retired from full time teaching and currently holds the status of Professor Emeritus. Whiten's students include many accomplished artists, including Sandra Brewster, Michael Chambers, June Clark, Shabnam K.Ghazi, Francis LeBouthillier, and Larry Towell.

Whiten does not consider himself an artist but an "image maker who also creates cultural objects" and to this end, has studied Zen Buddhism and the Kabbala. His choice of materials comes from everyday experiences and many of his objects are either tools or toys. These objects, representing work and play, and which can include a broom, shovel, pickaxe, rolling pin, rocking horse, tricycle, and sled, are meant to take the viewer to another place. He considers the transcendental a key to his work. Whiten has used the human skull in his art since the 1970s. Rather than the skull representing memento mori, Whiten feels that in his work, it is "concerned with the potential in life and a reverence for those who proceed us." The focus of Whiten's artistic output is the "human condition and the interconnectivity of the body, the spirit and the earth." Whiten's work emphasizes the transformative potential of the human experience, exploring ancient forms of consciousness, myth, and ritual.

His work is represented by the Olga Korper Gallery, Toronto. In 2025, the Art Canada Institute published the monograph Tim Whiten: Life & Work by Carolyn Bell Farrell. Whiten lives in Toronto, Ontario.

== Selected solo exhibitions ==
Tim Whiten's work has often been shown in solo exhibitions at the Olga Korper Gallery, Toronto (from 1986 to 2019), the Tom Thomson Art Gallery, Owen Sound (2018), the Meridian Gallery, San Francisco (2010, 2004, 2001), the Art Gallery of Hamilton (2010), the Canadian Clay and Glass Gallery, Waterloo (2006), the Liane and Danny Taran Gallery, Saidye Bronfman Centre for the Arts, Montreal (1998), and the Koffler Gallery, Toronto (1997), among others. Tim Whiten: Tools of Conveyance, curated by Sandra Q. Firmin in 2021 for the Colorado University Art Museum in Boulder, Colorado, was organized around themes and processes that emerged in Whiten's work from the late 1960s to the present. In 2022, four exhibitions featuring the work of Whiten as part of a multi-venue collaborative project titled Elemental: Ethereal between the McMaster Museum of Art, Robert McLaughlin Gallery, Art Gallery of Peterborough, and the Art Gallery at York University celebrated his work regarding one of the four classical elements: air, water, fire and earth.

== Ritual installations ==
In 1976, Whiten acted as a collaborator and participant in Lectures on the Weather, written and directed by John Cage for the United States Bicentennial in 1976 and shown at the Albright-Knox Gallery in Buffalo and The Music Gallery, Toronto. He has done many site-specific works for galleries or art parks in New York, Toronto, Vancouver, Halifax, Sackville, and elsewhere.

== Selected group exhibitions ==
Whiten's work has been included in numerous group exhibitions, including exhibitions held at the Art Gallery of Ontario; Art Gallery of Hamilton; Art Gallery of Windsor; the Museum of Contemporary Art, Toronto;, the Agnes Etherington Art Centre, Kingston; The Robert McLaughlin Gallery, Oshawa; University of Buffalo Art Galleries, Buffalo; Art Museum, University of Toronto; Stewart Hall Art Gallery, Pont-Claire, Quebec; the Royal Ontario Museum, Toronto; the MacKenzie Art Gallery, Regina; Dalhousie University, Halifax; Leonard & Bina Ellen Art Gallery, Concordia University, Montreal; Art Gallery of Peterborough; the Tom Thomson Art Gallery, Owen Sound; the Textile Museum of Canada, Toronto, the Tree Museum, Bracebridge, Ontario; and the Institute of Contemporary Art, Boston.

== Public collections ==
Whiten's work has been collected in depth by the Art Gallery of Hamilton, Ontario, the Tom Thomson Art Gallery, Owen Sound, and the Art Museum, University of Toronto. His work can also be found in the National Gallery of Canada, Ottawa, the Art Gallery of Ontario, Toronto, the Art Gallery of Windsor, Ontario, Agnes Etherington Art Centre, Kingston, the Robert McLaughlin Gallery, Oshawa, the MacKenzie Art Gallery, Regina, the Museum of Contemporary Art, Toronto, as well as by the Fine Art Museums of San Francisco (both the de Young Museum and the Legion of Honor, Achenbach Foundation for the Graphic Arts). The extensive range of collections holding his work can be found in a list in his biography in A Dictionary of Canadian Artists, volume 9 (online only), by Anne Newlands and Judith Parker, National Gallery of Canada / Musée des beaux-arts du Canada.

== Commissions ==
In 1966, Whiten created a monumental sculpture (45 foot) erected in Jasper State Recreation Site, Oregon.

== Artist residencies ==
In 1974, Whiten participated in a residency at Pennsylvania State University, College Park, PA, and was made a Fellow of the Arts & Humanistic Studies program. In 1977, he created Morada, a site-specific installation with ritual at Artpark in Lewiston, NY. Between 2001 and 2002, Whiten participated in the Sacatar Residency Fellowship in Itaparica, Bahia, Brazil.

== Awards and memberships ==
In 1989, Tim Whiten received the Distinguished Leadership Award, for Extraordinary Service to the Arts, from the American Biographical Institute. He was given the 1999/2000 Faculty of Fine Arts Dean's Teaching Award, York University, Toronto. In 2008, Whiten was selected as a finalist for the Premier's Award for Excellence in the Arts, given by the Government of Ontario. He is a member of the Royal Canadian Academy of Arts.

In 2022, Whiten won the Gershon Iskowitz Prize at the AGO. In 2023, he was awarded the Governor General's Award in Visual and Media Arts for Artistic Achievement.

In 2026, he was named as an Officer of the Order of Canada. He lives in Toronto.
