= Jerusalem Institute for Market Studies =

Economic think tank

JIMS | Jerusalem Institute for Market Studies
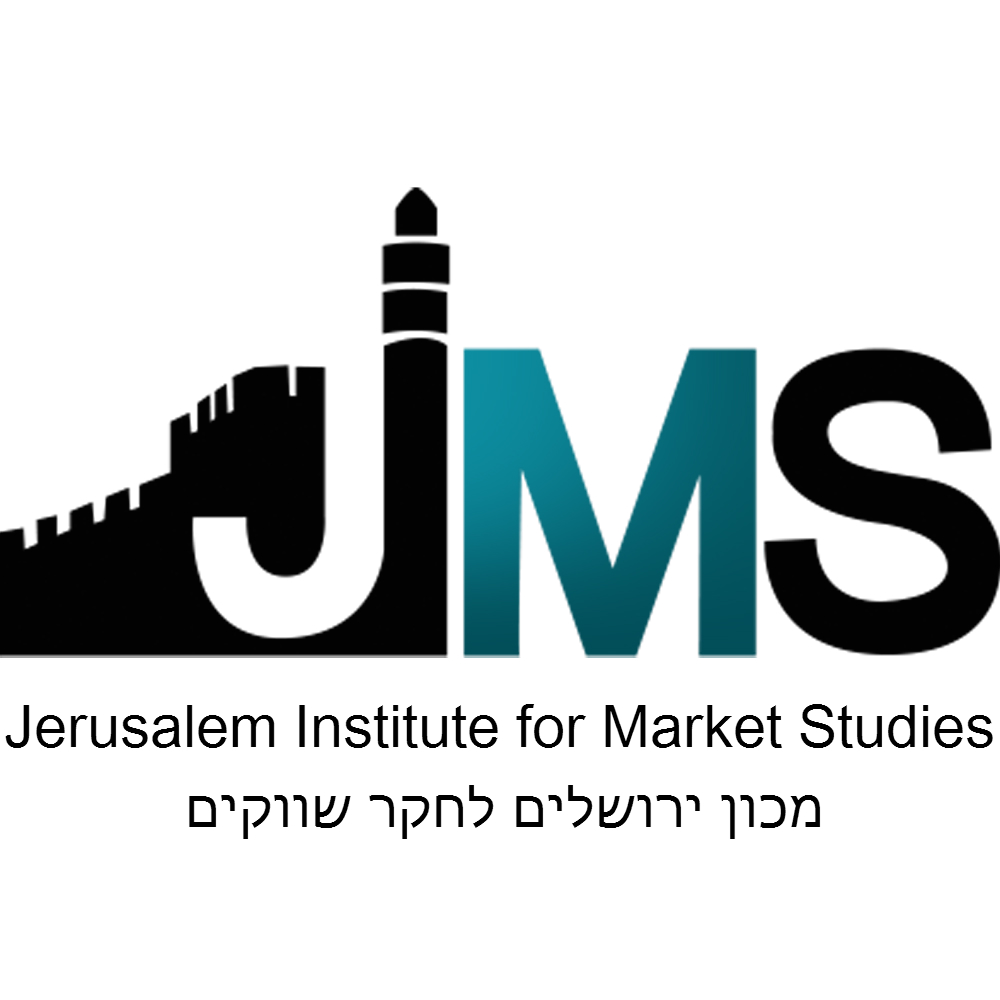
- Native name: מכון ירושלים לחקר שווקים
- Company type: Nonprofit organization
- Industry: Economics
- Founded: 2003
- Headquarters: Kovshei Katamon 9, Jerusalem, Israel
- Revenue: 812,919 new shekel (2020)
- Number of employees: 5 (2020)
- Website: jims-israel.org

The Jerusalem Institute for Market Studies (JIMS) is an independent, nonprofit economic policy think tank whose mission is to promote social progress in Israel through economic freedom and individual liberty. It advocates for free market reforms.

JIMS, founded in 2003, publishes economic policy papers and editorials, runs educational projects, and administers a national public opinion survey called the Israel Panel Study of Opinion Dynamics (IPSOD). It was cofounded by Corinne and Robert Sauer.

It is mostly funded by donations from individuals and grants from foundations in the United States.

== Research ==
JIMS houses three research centers, the Center for Data Analysis (CDA), the Center for Public Policy (CPP), and the Center for the Study of Judaism and Economics (CSJE).

- CDA calculates Israel Tax Freedom Day each year, publishes Israel's entry in the Economic Freedom of the World index, and administers the Israel Panel Study of Opinion Dynamics.
- CPP disseminates position papers to Israel's lawmakers and the general public on economic issues currently being debated in the Knesset. CPP's position papers are regularly cited in Knesset deliberations.
- CSJE is devoted to exploring the connection between Judaism and economic theory and policy. CSJE was inaugurated in November 2008 with a lecture on "Economics in the Talmud" by Professor Robert Aumann, the winner of the 2005 Nobel Prize in Economics.

== Education ==
JIMS runs an interdisciplinary seminar series on the principles of classical liberalism. Yearly fellowships are offered to university students that attend the seminars. In addition, JIMS has a monthly public lecture series and organizes workshops on economics and public policy for working professionals and high school students.
