= June Clark =

June Clark may refer to:

- June Clark (nurse) (1941–2025), British nurse, educator, and academic
- June Clark (artist) (born 1941), Canadian artist
- June Clark (musician) (1900–1963), American jazz trumpeter and cornetist
- June Clark (bowls) (born 1939), Australian Paralympic lawn bowls player
