= The Efficient Society =

The Efficient Society: Why Canada is as Close to Utopia as it Gets
- First edition
- Author: Joseph Heath
- Publisher: Viking Press
- ISBN: 0-670-89149-5

The Efficient Society: Why Canada is as Close to Utopia as it Gets is a book by Canadian philosopher and author Joseph Heath. First released in 2001, the book is Heath's attempt to explain why Canada 'works'. He argues that Canada's successes as a nation are largely attributable to its commitment to efficiency as a value. The book was released to positive reviews, and became a national best-seller.

== Overview ==
Drawing on rational choice and game theory, Heath argues that a vast array of social problems are in fact the result of prisoner's dilemmas and collective action problems. While capitalism as a means of production alleviates many of these (such as shirking), it creates many others. Government intervention in the economy can further help to relieve these collective action problems. Heath argues that the government should operate only in markets where a collective action problem occurs and not in markets where this problem is absent (where it is a race to the bottom not a race to the top). This is one of the reasons, Heath argues, that the United Nations Annual Human Development Report consistently ranks Canada as the best place in the world to live. Canadians throughout their history have shown greater tolerance for government intervention than their American counterparts and Heath argues that it is for this reason that Canada is "as close to utopia as its gets".

Heath also clarifies the book's optimistic title, stating that it is obviously an exaggeration. He claims that "as close to utopia as it gets" may in fact not be very close at all.

=== Health care ===
"Comparing health care provision in the United States and Canada (i.e., private versus public insurance schemes), Heath argues that while both systems have inherent problems, the greatest level of well-being with respect to health is to be found in welfare, not market-based, economies... Heath also argues that by maintaining physicians on a fee schedule, as opposed to letting the market establish the price of services, the Canadian health care system keeps the amount of gross domestic product spent on health care significantly lower than in the US."

== See also ==
- The Rebel Sell, co-authored by Joseph Heath
- Filthy Lucre: Economics for People Who Hate Capitalism
