= McGill Institute for the Study of Canada =

Canadian think tank

- Established: 1994
- Key people: Daniel Béland, Director
- Address: 840 ave du Docteur-Penfield, room 102
- Location: McGill University, Montreal, Quebec, Canada
- Website: mcgill.ca/misc

McGill Institute for the Study of Canada (MISC) is a nonpartisan Canadian academic institute established in 1994 with support from the Bronfman family and McGill University. Along with its academic programs, MISC hosts annual conferences and other large-scale activities that are open to the public. MISC research and public events focuses on topics of interest to Canadians.

== History ==
MISC was established in 1994 with support from the Bronfman family and McGill University with Desmond Morton as Founding Director.

== Mandate ==
According to its website, MISC's mission is "to enrich Canadian society in three primary ways. First, by convening conversations about matters that are important to Canadians. Second, by educating and engaging students to be active participants in Canada’s future. Finally, by promoting interdisciplinary scholarship about Canada."

== Key people ==
The Founding Director was Desmond Morton, who served from MISC's creation in 1994 until 2001. Past Directors include Antonia Maioni, who served from 2001 until 2011; Will Straw, who served from 2011 to 2016; and Andrew Potter who served from August 2016 until March 2017. Suzanne Morton, who is now an editor at Canadian Historical Review, served as Acting Director in 2014. Elsbeth Heaman served as the interim Director from April 2017 to April 2018. Daniel Béland is the current Director of MISC.

== Conferences ==
MISC holds an annual conference in Montreal at McGill University. The theme for the 2022 conference was "Comparing Immigration Policies: Canada and the World" and was held on October 27 and 28, 2022 in Montreal.

Past conferences have focused on taxation, federalism, Canadian exceptionalism, food policy, urban planning, and more.

== Selected publications ==
In his MISC study, University of Toronto's political science professor, Michael Donnelly, concluded that there is potential in Canada for an increase in intolerance and an anti-immigrate/refugee stance. Donnelly's used data from a January 18–27, 2017, Ipsos poll which surveyed 1,522 Canadians.

== The Andrew Potter affair ==
Andrew Potter resigned as MISC director in response to harsh criticism of his March 2017 article published in Maclean's describing an alleged malaise in Quebec society, some of which Potter later refuted. Potter's "sweeping and unflattering comments about Quebec society" went viral. Quebec's premier and finance minister along with the federal heritage minister, "decried" the article and called for Potter's removal as MISC Director. McGill University immediately "disavowed" the article. Potter admitted to "errors" and produced "corrigenda." In a March 2017 article in The Walrus, Jonathan Kay described how MISC, is faced with a difficult choice in choosing the next Director. Kay described how MISC will face challenges in dealing with topical issues because of its location within an elite university setting, with a long history of public research and numerous funding partners—corporate and government. The next MISC director could be based on the Straw model, Potter's or in-between—a "journalist with centrist, institutional tendencies". Len Findlay, from Ryerson University's Centre for Free Expression (CFE) noted errors were made by all parties and called on MISC to rehire Potter as Director and to "become as it claims to be, "no stranger to debate and controversy", to use "rebuttal, not reprisal".
