= Filthy Lucre: Economics for People Who Hate Capitalism =

2009 book by philosopher Joseph Heath

- Author: Joseph Heath
- Language: English
- Subject: Capitalism
- Publisher: HarperCollins
- Publication place: Canada
- ISBN: 978-1-55468-395-6

Filthy Lucre: Economics for People Who Hate Capitalism is a 2009 book by Canadian philosopher Joseph Heath.

The book is organized around what Heath claims are twelve fallacies or myths associated with economics, six of which are common on the left, and six of which are common on the right. It considers ideas like that the government should get out of the way of markets; that competition and Adam Smith’s invisible hand improve efficiency; the 'psychopathic' nature of corporations; and the inevitability of capitalism's collapse.

A United States edition of the book was released in 2010 under the title Economics without Illusions: Debunking the Myths of Modern Capitalism.

The book is one of an increased number on the topics of capitalism and finance that were published in the wake of global economic downturn beginning in 2008.

== Overview ==
The book is intended to clarify core ideas in economics which he feels are systematically misunderstood. As in his previous bestseller The Efficient Society, Heath argues that the government should operate only in markets where a collective action problem occurs and not in markets where this problem is absent (where it is a race to the bottom not a race to the top). In these good-competition markets Heath defends price gouging, outsourcing and free trade (criticizing price-fixing, trade protectionism and fair trade). In bad-competition markets Heath argues that by risk-pooling the government provides a natural and optimal solution for everyone. He defends the free market against the lump of labour argument, arguing that increases in efficiency are win-win situations despite job loss and other consequences. Likewise he describes international trade as non-exploitative. Trade specialization increases efficiency thereby increasing the price value of one's labour. This is because the price value of labour is a function of the efficiency of an economy.

In the book Heath criticizes the idea that tax-paying is inherently different from consumption, and that the idea of a tax freedom day is flawed:

It would make just as much sense to declare an annual "mortgage freedom day", in order to let mortgage owners know what day they "stop working for the bank and start working for themselves". ...But who cares? Homeowners are not really "working for the bank"; they're merely financing their own consumption. After all, they're the ones living in the house, not the bank manager.

== See also ==
- Freakonomics
- Predictably Irrational
