= The Rebel Sell =

2004 book by Joseph Heath and Andrew Potter

The Rebel Sell: Why the Culture Can't be Jammed
- First edition
- Authors: Joseph Heath; Andrew Potter
- Language: English
- Published: 2004
- Publisher: HarperCollins
- Publication place: Canada
- ISBN: 978-1-84112-654-8

The Rebel Sell: Why the Culture Can't be Jammed (released in the United States as Nation of Rebels: Why Counterculture Became Consumer Culture) is a non-fiction book written by Canadian authors Joseph Heath and Andrew Potter in 2004. The thesis of the book is that counter-cultural movements have failed to effect any progressive political or economic consequences; thus counter-culture is not a threat to "the establishment".

== Consumerism ==
Potter and Heath argue against the notion that consumerism is driven by conformity; instead, they state we are largely motivated by competitive consumption, which is an attempt to attain status distinction through the products we buy. They suggest it is the nonconformists, not the conformists, who are driving consumer spending. They claim this has led to the "rebel consumer". Since all goods depend on exclusivity for their value, a purchasing arms race is always in existence as consumers struggle to outdo one another: if you lag, you become mainstream. They note, the image of rebelliousness and critique of mass society has been one of the most powerful forces driving consumerism for the past forty years. Far from being 'subversive,' being a rebel consumer has had no political or economic consequences and is simply a form of status distinction.

== Conformity ==
Following their claim that conformity isn't something perpetuated by mainstream media, Potter and Heath identify other sources of conformity using work from Thomas Hobbes, Jean-Jacques Rousseau and Sigmund Freud. They describe conformity as the byproduct of simple market preferences, or alternatively, an attempt to resolve a collective action problem. For instance, they claim school uniforms successfully curb the fashion 'arms race' created between students when no restrictions are in place, and they are not utilized to remove individualism, as many counter-cultural figures have suggested. According to Potter and Heath, social customs provide security that saves us from a constant need to recalculate the significance of our surroundings. For example, thanks to rules of traffic, a pedestrian can generally safely stand on a sidewalk, without needing to calculate at each instance whether an oncoming bus might stay within its lane or whether it might hit the pedestrian. Thus, rules are by no means inherently oppressive: the undesirability of many facets of society (such as consumerism) are, if anything, caused from the 'bottom up'. Other researchers have called this effect Trickle-up fashion. To Potter and Heath, some rules may be beneficial, and some rules may be useful.

== Collective action problems ==
Heath and Potter state most of society's problems (and rules) are traceable to collective action problems, not to traits inherent in consumer culture. They assert culture jammers, attempts to disrupt the existing social order, are largely inconsequential. They further suggest, this 'subversive' action allows people to wrongly claim a political element to their lifestyle preferences, and in extreme cases, this can result in the glorification of criminality as a form of dissent.

The authors offer a number of solutions to these collective action problems. They recommend a simple legislative solution to problems such as consumerism, for example, through eliminating tax deductions for advertising. (The notion that top-down solutions are far more effective than the "think globally act locally" grassroots movement of the 1960s is a running theme). The authors also point, however, to the counterculture's tendency to reject institutional solutions, a mistake which merely allows the problem to remain intact.

== Criticism ==
In his review of the book, Derrick O'Keefe claims the book does not argue for "a more coherent and effective Left politics," but for a "strident defense of markets and capitalism." He accuses the authors of using strawman arguments, and misrepresenting people they criticize (he accuses them of oversimplifying Naomi Klein's No Logo and misrepresenting Antonio Gramsci's concept of cultural hegemony). O'Keefe also accuses the book of being racist, as it claims that Detroit's black population's participation in the 12th Street riot was the cause of the neighborhood's problems while omitting the many root causes of the riots entirely. He also cites the book "lumping political prisoner Mumia Abu-Jamal in with the likes of Lorena Bobbitt and the Columbine shooters." O'Keefe claims that the authors' defense of white rapper Eminem (while criticizing contemporary black hip-hop) shows their ignorance of the subject and ignores politically conscious black hip-hop artists.

A review of the book in The Guardian claims "the argument it makes is important and original" but says that "in places it is also unfair, light on evidence and repetitively polemical." It also claims the book "relies too heavily on setting up straw men," and finds that while the authors are pro-welfare and anti-unfettered business, their "dislike of the capitalist fixation with youth culture... comes close to a fogeyish distaste for youth culture itself" and they "sound as nostalgic as any conservative newspaper columnist for the world before the 60s." Additionally, the review claims the authors focus too much on North America, ignoring the "more paternalistic and less fashion-fixated" capitalism and non-commodified dissent in other parts of the world.

A review of the book from The A.V. Club claims the "prose... betrays a deep social conservatism," and the authors "frustratingly treat the concepts of gradual reform and a total revolution in human consciousness as an either/or proposition." It further claims the good ideas of the book were "borrowed wholesale from [Thomas] Frank and from Bobos in Paradise author David Brooks," but the book fails to have equal quality due to "the unsavory combo of faulty reasoning and weak arguments."

=== Authors Response ===
Heath and Potter responded to the criticisms made in interviews, lectures, and an epilogue added to later editions of the book. They gave their personal and political biographies to establish their left-wing credentials. They also acknowledged flaws in the explanation of some of their arguments. However, they also criticized their reviewers for confusing their attack on the ideals of counterculture as an attack on art or the Left in general.

== See also ==
- Culture jamming
- The Efficient Society – an earlier book by Joseph Heath
- Thomas Frank – an inspiration of the book
- Conspicuous consumption – social distinction
- Cool – a major topic in Rebel Sell
- The Theory of the Leisure Class – Thorstein Veblen's 1899 monograph on industrial culture
