= Larry Towell =

Canadian photographer, poet and oral historian (born 1953)

- Born: 1953 (age 72–73); Chatham-Kent, Ontario, Canada
- Occupations: Photographer, photojournalist
- Known for: Photojournalism
- Awards: World Press Photo of the Year; Leica Oskar Barnack Award; Henri Cartier-Bresson Foundation Award; Prix Nadar
- Website: larrytowell.com

Larry Towell (born 1953) is a Canadian photographer, poet, and oral historian. Towell is known for his photographs of sites of political conflict in Ukraine, Nicaragua, El Salvador, Standing Rock and Afghanistan, among others. In 1988, Towell became the only Canadian member of Magnum Photos.

== Early life and education ==
Towell was born in 1953, in Wallaceburg, Ontario (now part of the incorporated Chatham-Kent, Ontario) and grew up in a large family in rural Ontario, attending local schools. He studied visual arts at York University in Toronto, where his interest in photography first began. One of his teachers at York University was Tim Whiten, the acclaimed contemporary artist.

== Life and work ==
In 1976, Towell volunteered to work in Calcutta, India, where he became interested in questions about the distribution of wealth and issues of land and landlessness. Returning to Canada, he taught folk music and wrote poetry during the 1980s.

Towell became a freelance photographer in 1984. Towell's photographic projects are often long-form investigative pieces; this format allows him to connect with the subjects he depicts. His early work included a project on the Contra war in Nicaragua, in which he met civilians who the United States-backed Contras had persecuted, including landmine victims. He also photographed the civil war in El Salvador, American Vietnam War veterans who worked to rebuild Vietnam, and relatives of the "disappeared" in Guatemala - those presumed murdered by Guatemalan security forces. His book House on Ninth Street is a collection of his photos taken in Guatemala during this time.

In 1988, Towell joined the Magnum Photos agency, becoming the only Canadian associated with the group. His first magazine essay looked at the ecological damages from the Exxon Valdez oil spill. He has since had picture essays published in The New York Times, Life, Rolling Stone, and other magazines. His work has included documentation of the Palestinian-Israeli conflict, Mennonite migrant workers in Mexico, and a personal project on his family's farm in southern Ontario.

From 2008 to 2011, Towell traveled five times to Afghanistan to photograph the social effects of the Afghan civil war. Between 2013 and 2015, he photographed the above and underground construction work in Toronto's Union Station. In 2015, his photo Isaac's first swim was published by Canada Post as a stamp. In 2016, Towell photographed the Standing Rock protest in Standing Rock, North Dakota.

He works in both film and digital photography formats. He has said "Black and white is still the poetic form of photography. Digital is for the moment; black and white is an investment of time and love." He has also worked with panoramic cameras to document the impact of natural disasters such as Hurricane Katrina.

Towell has published books of photographs, poetry, and oral history. He has also recorded several audio CDs of original poetry and songs.

== Personal life ==
Towell lives in rural Lambton County, and sharecrops a 75-acre farm with his wife Ann and their four children.

== Publications ==
- Burning Cadillacs (1983)
- Gifts of War (1988)
- Somoza's Last Stand (1990)
- The Prison Poems of Ho Chi Minh (1992)
- House on Ninth Street (1994)
- El Salvador (1997)
- Then Palestine (1999)
- The Mennonites (2000)
  - Second edition. London: Gost, 2022. ISBN 978-1-910401-53-8. Re-edited, re-sequenced and with 40 new images.
- No Man's Land (2005)
- In the Wake of Katrina (2006)
- The World From My Front Porch (2008)
- The Cardboard House: MSF Peru - Action on Aids. Trolley Books. 2008. ISBN 978-1-904563-71-6.
- Ruins: Afghanistan (2009)

== Films ==
- Indecisive Moments: Video Diary of a Still Photographer (2007) – 40 minute video diary made in the Israeli-occupied territories.
- The Man I Left Behind (2024) - documentary film co-directed with Hubert Hayaud and Matthieu Rytz

== Awards ==
- 1991: Silver Medal, Canadian National Awards
- 1991: Grant of $2500 from the W. Eugene Smith Memorial Fund to make work about the Nahuas in El Salvador
- 1991/93: Gold Medal, Western Canada Magazine Awards
- 1993: 1st Prize, Daily Life Stories category, World Press Photo
- 1994: Winner, World Press Photo of the Year and General News Stories category
- 1994: 1st Prize, World Press Photo, Daily Life Stories category
- 1994: Picture of the Year, Canon Photo Essay Award
- 1994/95: Gold Medal, Canadian National Awards
- 1995: Photographers' work grant, The Ernst Haas Awards, Maine Photographic Workshops
- 1996: El Mundo Award
- 1996: Oskar Barnack Award
- 1997: Golden Light (Best Monograph Award)
- 1998: Society of Publication Designers, Merit Award, The New York Times Magazine
- 1998: Society of Publication Designers, Magazine of the Year, The New York Times
- 1998: Overseas Press Club, New York, Citation of Excellence
- 1998: Pictorial Prize, Pictures of the Year Foundation, University of Missouri
- 1998: 1st Prize, Portraiture Essay category, Alfred Eisenstaedt Awards for Magazine Photography, Columbia University Graduate School of Journalism
- 1999: Picture Of the Year (Best Use of Photography in Books)
- 1999: Roloff Beny Book Award
- 1999: Grant from the Hasselblad Foundation, Gothenburg, Sweden
- 2000: Society for News Design Award, La Nacion
- 2003: Henri Cartier-Bresson Foundation Award
- 2005: Prix Nadar, for the book No Man's Land
- 2007: Finalist, Alicia Patterson Award, USA
- 2007: Achievement In Filmmaking Award, New York International Independent Film and Video Festival
- 2009: Shortlisted, And/or Photography Book Award, Kraszna-Krausz Foundation, UK for The World From My Front Porch
- 2011: The Paul de Hueck and Norman Walford Career Achievement Award, Ontario Arts Foundation
- 2023: Inducted into the Chatham-Kent Cultural Hall of Fame for his contributions to the visual arts as a photographer and photojournalist

== Exhibitions ==
- 1991: Le Mois de la Photo - Maison de la Culture Plateau, Montreal, Quebec, Canada
- 1994: Carnets de Voyage - Canadian Museum of Contemporary Photography, Ottawa, Ontario, Canada
- 1994: Retrospective - Nieuwekerk, the Netherlands
- 1997: Circulo de Bellas Artes, Madrid, Spain
- 1997: Noorderlicht Photo Festival, Groningen, Netherlands
- 2001: Canadian Museum of Contemporary Photography, Ottawa, Ontario, Canada
- 2001: Scottish National Portrait Gallery, Edinburgh, UK
- 2005: No Man's Land - Fondation Henri Cartier-Bresson, Paris
- 2006: FOAM, Amsterdam, Netherlands
- 2008: George Eastman House, Rochester, New York
- 2012: Royal Ontario Museum, Toronto, Ontario, Canada
- 2025: "The Museum Collection" solo exhibition at Stephen Bulger Gallery, Toronto, Ontario, Canada
