= Andrew Potter =

Canadian pundit, philosopher, & editor

- Born: 1972 (age 53–54); Teulon, Manitoba, Canada
- Education: McGill University, University of Toronto, Glebe Collegiate Institute, Trent University, University of Montreal
- Occupations: Professor, Writer, Journalist
- Organization(s): McGill University, Ottawa Citizen, Maclean's
- Known for: Journalism

Andrew Potter is a Canadian author and associate professor at McGill University's Max Bell School of Public Policy in Montreal, Quebec. He is best known for co-authoring The Rebel Sell with Joseph Heath and for his 2010 book The Authenticity Hoax. He was formerly editor-in-chief of the Ottawa Citizen; and director of the McGill Institute for the Study of Canada.

== Early life, family and education ==
Potter was born in Teulon, Manitoba. He attended Glebe Collegiate Institute in Ottawa but graduated from McGill University with a BA in Philosophy. He subsequently earned his MA and Ph.D. degrees in philosophy at the University of Toronto. He also spent three years as an assistant professor at Trent University. Potter completed postdoctoral work at the Centre de recherches en éthique (CREUM) at the University of Montreal after graduation.

== Career ==
Potter taught philosophy at Trent University in Peterborough, Ontario, from 2001 to 2004. He left academia to become National Editor at the Ottawa Citizen, a daily newspaper. In 2010 Potter left the Ottawa Citizen, when he was appointed Features Editor at Canadian Business in Toronto. From 2007 to 2012, Potter wrote a column for the Canadian national weekly news magazine Maclean's. He also served as Director of the Montreal-based McGill Institute for the Study of Canada (MISC).

Potter returned to the Ottawa Citizen to become Managing Editor in 2011 and was promoted to Editor-In-Chief in December 2013. In 2013, Potter and the Ottawa Citizen were awarded the Michener Award for reporting that exposed the use of "robocalls" to mislead and harass voters during the 2011 federal election campaign.

In March 2017, Potter published an article in Maclean's in which he talks about the lack of solidarity within Quebec society. This article was decried and denounced at Quebec's provincial legislature. The McGill administration tweeted that Potter did not represent the university's views. A few days after his article's publication, Potter distanced himself from elements of it. Soon thereafter, he resigned from his position at MISC, while remaining an associate professor. Distinguished national affairs commentators including Paul Wells and former Maclean's national editor Andrew Coyne questioned or condemned the backlash, specifically the perceived yielding to political pressure by an academic institution.

== Academic interests ==
Potter's academic background is in metaphysics and political philosophy, post-secondary educational policy, branding, consumerism, and popular culture. He maintains an interest in technology and the future of the news media.

== Selected publications ==
- Heath, Joseph; Potter, Andrew (2004). The Rebel Sell: Why the Culture Can't be Jammed. (US title: Nation of Rebels: Why Counterculture Became Consumer Culture)
- Potter, Andrew (2010). The Authenticity Hoax: How We Get Lost Finding Ourselves.
- Potter, Andrew (20 March 2017). "How a snowstorm exposed Quebec's real problem: social malaise". Maclean's.
