= Thomas A. McCarthy =

American philosophy academic

Thomas A. McCarthy (born 1940) is an American philosopher who is John Shaffer Professor of Philosophy Emeritus at Northwestern University. Before joining Northwestern in 1985, he taught for four years at LMU Munich and for thirteen years at Boston University. After retiring from Northwestern in 2006, he served for three years as William H. Orrick Visiting Professor at Yale University. Over the course of his academic career, McCarthy's work was supported by grants and fellowships from the National Endowment for the Humanities, the Alexander von Humboldt Foundation, the American Council of Learned Societies, and the Guggenheim Foundation. Early in his career he wrote and taught principally in the philosophy of logic and mathematics and then in the philosophy of the social sciences. Subsequently, and for the bulk of his career, he worked in the general area of critical, social and political theory, and in particular on the work of Jürgen Habermas, of which he is widely regarded as one of the foremost English-language interpreters. During his last decade of teaching, McCarthy focused on theoretical issues in the history of racist and imperialist thought, and particularly on their interweaving in theories of progress and development.

== Critical theory ==
The phrases "critical theory" and "Frankfurt School" are commonly used to refer to a tradition of philosophy and social theory that emerged in Germany between the World Wars in response to what were perceived to be deep flaws in modern Western culture and society. Centered in Frankfurt, its first generation of thinkers included such figures as Max Horkheimer, Theodor Adorno, Herbert Marcuse, and Walter Benjamin; the preeminent representative of the second, post-World War II generation was Jürgen Habermas, who began his academic career as Adorno's assistant. The third generation of critical theorists, to which McCarthy belongs, was from the start rather more international in its makeup, and more global in its outlook.

McCarthy's contribution to this tradition of thought comprises, first, further development of its philosophical and methodological underpinnings, particularly on issues surrounding the putative universality of modern Western ideas, practices, and institutions; second, interpretation and elaboration of Habermas's ideas that brought them into closer contact with Anglo-American traditions of philosophy and social theory, especially American Pragmatism; and third, application of the critical-theoretical perspective so developed to issues of racism and imperialism, which had been relatively undertheorized in the work of the first two generations. These contributions, together with his general editorship of the series "Studies in Contemporary German Social Thought" (MIT Press, c. 100 volumes), and his graduate training of some two dozen members of the fourth generation of critical theorists, are the grounds upon which McCarthy is generally held to be a founding member of the American branch of critical, social and political theory.

== Race and empire ==
In the first decade of the present millennium, in a series of articles and papers that culminated in a book on Race, Empire, and the Idea of Human Development (Cambridge UP, 2009), McCarthy turned his attention to the ideologies of race and empire that generally accompanied the rise of the West, and to the particular versions thereof that were integral to shaping American culture and society. His organizing theme is that ideas of sociocultural development—civilization, progress, modernization, etc. -- have been the principal lens through which the relations of the West to the rest of the world have been viewed. Through that lens, differences have appeared to be hierarchically ordered along various lines, from talent and temperament to morals and aptitude for self-government. McCarthy develops this theme by examining both racial theories of difference—from Kant, through social Darwinism, to the cultural racism of the present—and universal histories of cultural development that underwrote imperialism and neoimperialism. He concludes that despite the depredations and dangers of ideologies of progress, we have no alternative in a rapidly globalizing world but to rethink our conceptions of development so as to accommodate the multiple modernities now taking shape, without however, renouncing the aspiration to unity-in-difference for which there is no sensible substitute.

== Selected bibliography ==
- The Critical Theory of Jürgen Habermas (MIT Press, 1978);
- Ideals and Illusions: On Reconstruction and Deconstruction in Contemporary Critical Theory (MIT Press, 1991);
- Critical Theory, coauthored with David Hoy (Blackwell, 1994);
- Race, Empire, and the Idea of Human Development (Cambridge University Press, 2009);
- General editor, Studies in Contemporary German Social Thought (MIT Press, 1981–2009);
- Pluralism and the Pragmatic Turn. Essays in Honor of Thomas McCarthy. W. Rehg & J. Bohman, eds. (MIT Press, 2001);
- Book Symposium in Symposia on Gender, Race, and Philosophy 8 (2012), online at http://sgrp.typepad.com/sgrp/2012/04/new-symposium-on-thomas-mccarthy-race-empire-and-the-idea-of-human-development-2009.html;
- Book Symposium in Neue Politische Literatur 57 (2012): 25–31, online at http://www.neue-politische-literatur.tu-darmstadt.de/index.php?id=3323&L=0.
