= Giselinde Kuipers =

Dutch sociologist

- Born: 1971 (age 54–55)

Academic background
- Education: Utrecht University (MA), University of Amsterdam (PhD)

Academic work
- Discipline: sociology
- Sub-discipline: sociology of humor, sociology of media
- Institutions: KU Leuven

Giselinde Kuipers (born 1971) is a Dutch sociologist and research professor at the Center for Sociological Research at KU Leuven University. She is an Affiliate of the Weatherhead Research Cluster on Comparative Inequality and Inclusion. Kuipers is known for her works on the sociology of humor.

== Books ==
- Good Humor, Bad Taste: A Sociology of the Joke, De Gruyter Mouton 2006
