= June Clark (artist) =

Canadian artist (born 1941)

- Born: 1941 (age 84–85); New York City, U.S.
- Other name: June Clark-Greenberg
- Education: York University
- Known for: Photographer; Sculptor; Installation artist
- Movement: Contemporary art
- Website: JuneClark.ca

June Clark (born 1941) is a Toronto-based artist working in photography, installation sculpture and collage. Formerly known as June Clark-Greenberg, Born in Harlem, New York, Clark immigrated to Canada in 1968 and subsequently made Toronto her home. The questions of identity formation and their connection to our points of origin fuel her practice. Clark explores how history, memory, and identity—both individual and collective—have established the familial and artistic lineages that shape her work.

== Early life and education ==
Born in the Harlem neighborhood of New York City, Clark immigrated to Toronto, Canada in 1968, leaving the United States during a turbulent period of protest and social change. Both cities influence her work, and Clark notes that upon first moving to Toronto, "It was both the discovery of the unfamiliar and memory of the known that captured my imagination." After the move, Clark completed first a BFA in 1988 and then two years later, an MFA. at York University. One of her teachers at York University was Tim Whiten, the acclaimed contemporary artist.

== Work ==
Best known for her photo etchings and sculptural assemblages, Clark's practice excavates her personal experiences to investigate themes of black diasporic identity, exile and memory work. She began developing her early photography work through the Baldwin Street Gallery of Photography, co-founding The Women's Photography Co-op there in the early 1970s. Since then, her work has been exhibited in New York, Paris, Toronto, Montréal, Kyiv and Quito, Ecuador.

Clark began making her large photo etchings in the 1980s, with Formative Triptych (1989) being among her most well known images from this period. In these works, Clark repurposes family photographs, snapshots and negatives from her own documentary work, juxtaposing them with texts recalled from her childhood or appropriated from literature. Commenting on this pairing, Clark has said:

I know I have violated the photos by adding text and by editing out parts of the images when I wipe the etching plates, but they aren't about photography or printmaking. The images have become symbols of the people who have said these things to me.

Similarly, with Family Secrets (1992), for the series of the nineteen black painderd filled series of nineteen black-painted cigar boxes filled with mementoes "are like a… residue, not that they’re leftovers, but the people they evoke are here." Following these works, Clark continued to create photographic and sculptural installations, exhibiting Streetwise and Harlem Quilt in 1997 at The Studio Museum in Harlem, and Once… After at the Women's Art Resource Centre (WARC) in Toronto in 2000. Then in 2004, Clark produced the mixed-media work Dirge, "a personal lament for her homeland and the erosion of the values that shaped her identity." Made from bits of rusted metal that she collected from highways, this iconic work is Clark's rendering of the American flag as symbol of social disintegration.

In addition to regularly presenting her work over the past five decades, Clark has taught fine art courses at several institutions including York University and the University of Guelph, and has served on the boards of the Toronto Arts Council and OCAD University. She has also acted as a jury member for the Toronto Arts Council, the Ontario Arts Council and The Canada Council for the Arts, and in 2007, she was a jury member for the Ontario Association of Art Galleries' 30th Anniversary Awards. Since 2000, Clark has worked as a Cultural Affairs Officer for the City of Toronto government.

== Exhibitions ==
Clark began exhibiting her work in the early 1970s in both New York and Toronto; early group exhibitions include shows at The James Van DerZee Institute in New York City and at Harbourfront Centre in Toronto in 1975 and the Oakville Art Gallery in 1979. In 1974, she had her first two solo exhibitions in Toronto, Portraits of Cuba at the Parkdale branch of the Toronto Public Library, and My Family at The Baldwin Street Gallery of Photography.

While Clark continued to participate in exhibitions throughout the 1980s, in the 1990s, her work was included in two major group exhibitions: The Creation... Of the African Canadian Odyssey at The Power Plant Contemporary Art Gallery in Toronto in 1992 and Just the Facts? Contemporary Documentary Approaches at The Canadian Museum of Contemporary Photography in Ottawa, part of the biennale Le Mois de la Photo à Montréal 1999. While living in Paris, Clark's work was also included in Le Mois de la Photo à Paris in 1994. She also had her first major solo show in a professional gallery, Mnemosyne at Mercer Union in 1990, where the Formative Triptych installation made its debut. Four years later, Clark had a second key solo show, Whispering City at The Koffler Gallery (now The Koffler Centre of the Arts), where work from the previous five years was on view.

In the mid-2000s, Clark participated in two further significant group exhibitions; in 2005, her work was presented in Tribute: The Art of African Canadians at both The Peel Art Gallery and The Art Gallery of Mississauga, and in 2006, Dirge (2004) was included in Fray, a collaborative exhibition between the Textile Museum of Canada and The Koffler Gallery. Most recently, Clark's work was on display in the 2016 exhibition Toronto: Tributes + Tributaries, 1971–1989 at the Art Gallery of Ontario as "a notable first-timer."

Clark's work was included in the 2025 exhibition Photography and the Black Arts Movement, 1955–1985 at the National Gallery of Art.

== Recognition ==
Earlier in her career, Clark was selected for The Studio Museum in Harlem Artist-in-Residence program from 1996 to 1997. Prior to that, she was also awarded The Canada Council Studio in Paris annually from 1993 to 1996. She has also received multiple grants from The Ontario Arts Council and Toronto Arts Council.

== Collections ==
- Art Gallery of Ontario, Toronto, ON
- National Gallery of Canada, Ottawa, ON
- The Robert McLaughlin Gallery, Oshawa, ON.
- Galerie du Jour – Agnès b., Paris, France
- Collection of Agnès b., Paris, France
