= List of people from Hayward, California =

This is a list of people from Hayward, California. People from Hayward who are strongly associated with the city include founder William Dutton Hayward, and the Ukrainian patriot and Greek Orthodox priest Agapius Honcharenko, who created a farm whose location is now a historic landmark. High-profile people from Hayward include football coach Bill Walsh, figure skater Kristi Yamaguchi, wrestler and film star Dwayne Johnson, and Treasurer of the United States Rosa Gumataotao Rios. Charles Plummer, prior to becoming Alameda County Sheriff, was the Police Chief of Hayward.

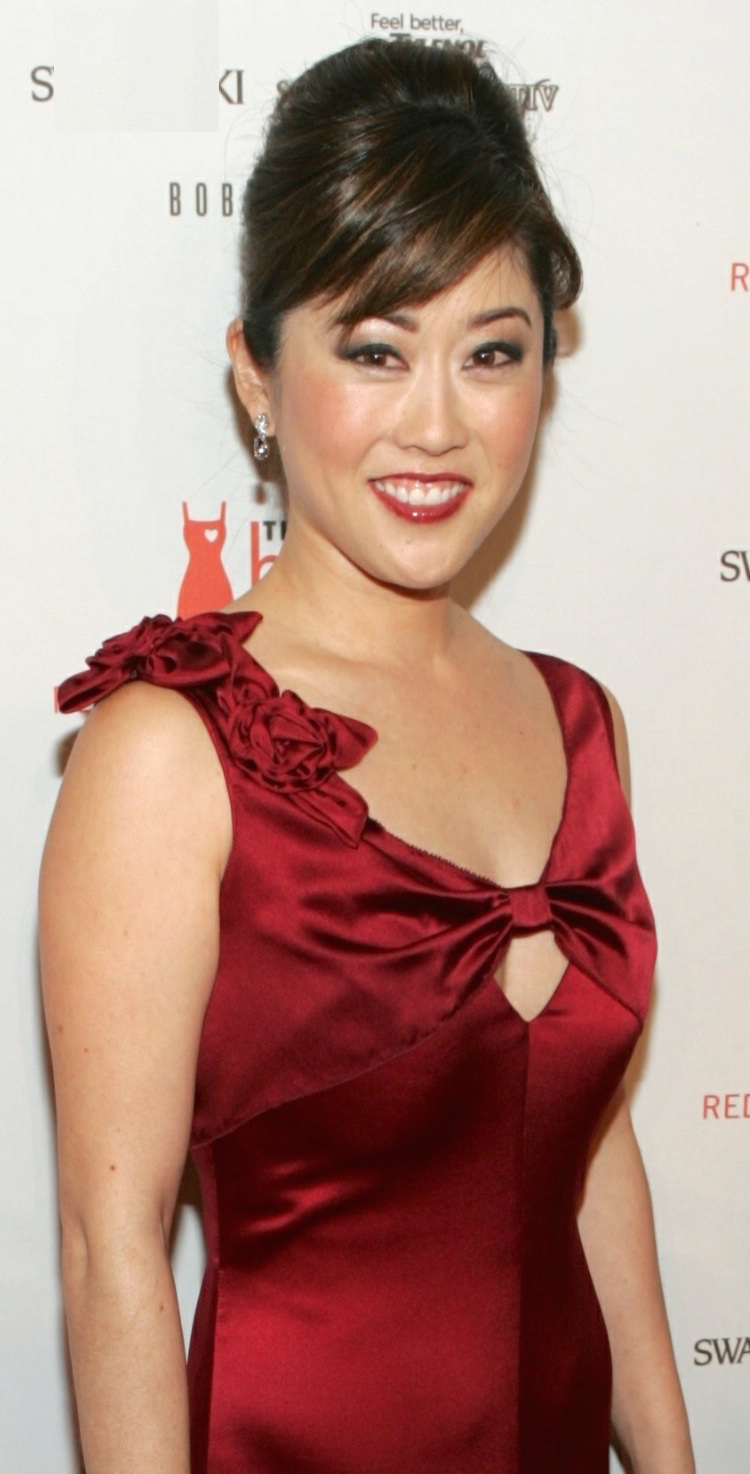
Kristi Yamaguchi

People born (b), raised (r) (including attending high school in Hayward), or who have lived as adults (a) in Hayward (bold names are current residents):

- Sena Acolatse (1990–) (b), hockey player
- Mahershala Ali (1974–) (r), Academy Award-winning actor
- Glen Alvelais (1968–) (b), heavy metal guitarist for Forbidden
- Max Baer (1909–1959) (a), boxer from the 1930s, Heavyweight Champion of the World, actor
- Chauncey Bailey (1949–2007) (r), murdered Oakland journalist
- Jeff Barnes (1955–) (r), National Football League linebacker
- Brian Beacock (1966–) (b), anime voice performer and actor
- Jeff Beal (1963–) (b), jazz instrumentalist, Emmy Award-winning film and television music composer
- John Beck (1981–) (b), National Football League quarterback with the Washington Redskins
- Davone Bess (1985–) (b), National Football League Miami Dolphins wide receiver
- Larry Bliss (1946–) (a), educator and former politician from Maine, now an administrator at California State University, East Bay
- Kimberlin Brown (1961–) (b), actress who played Sheila Carter on The Young and the Restless and The Bold and the Beautiful
- D. J. Carrasco (1977–) (r), baseball player
- Eddie Chacon (r), of the band Charles & Eddie, performers of the single "Would I Lie to You?"
- Julie Clark (1948–) (b), aerobatic air show pilot, daughter of the murdered pilot of Pacific Air Lines Flight 773
- James Graham Cooper (1830–1902) (a), surgeon, naturalist with the California Geological Survey, director of the California Academy of Sciences
- Brian Copeland (1974–) (r), playwright and author of Not a Genuine Black Man, a memoir of his experience growing up in the region
- Ellen Corbett (1954–) (a), California state senator
- Vanessa Curry (1990–) (r), dancer, member of the Pussycat Dolls
- Marco Dapper (1983–) (b), actor and model
- Jack Del Rio (1963–) (r), Oakland Raiders head coach, former head coach of Jacksonville Jaguars
- Glenn Dishman (1970–) (r), Major League Baseball pitcher
- Tommy Drake, real name Cory R. Carey (1979–) (a), professional wrestler
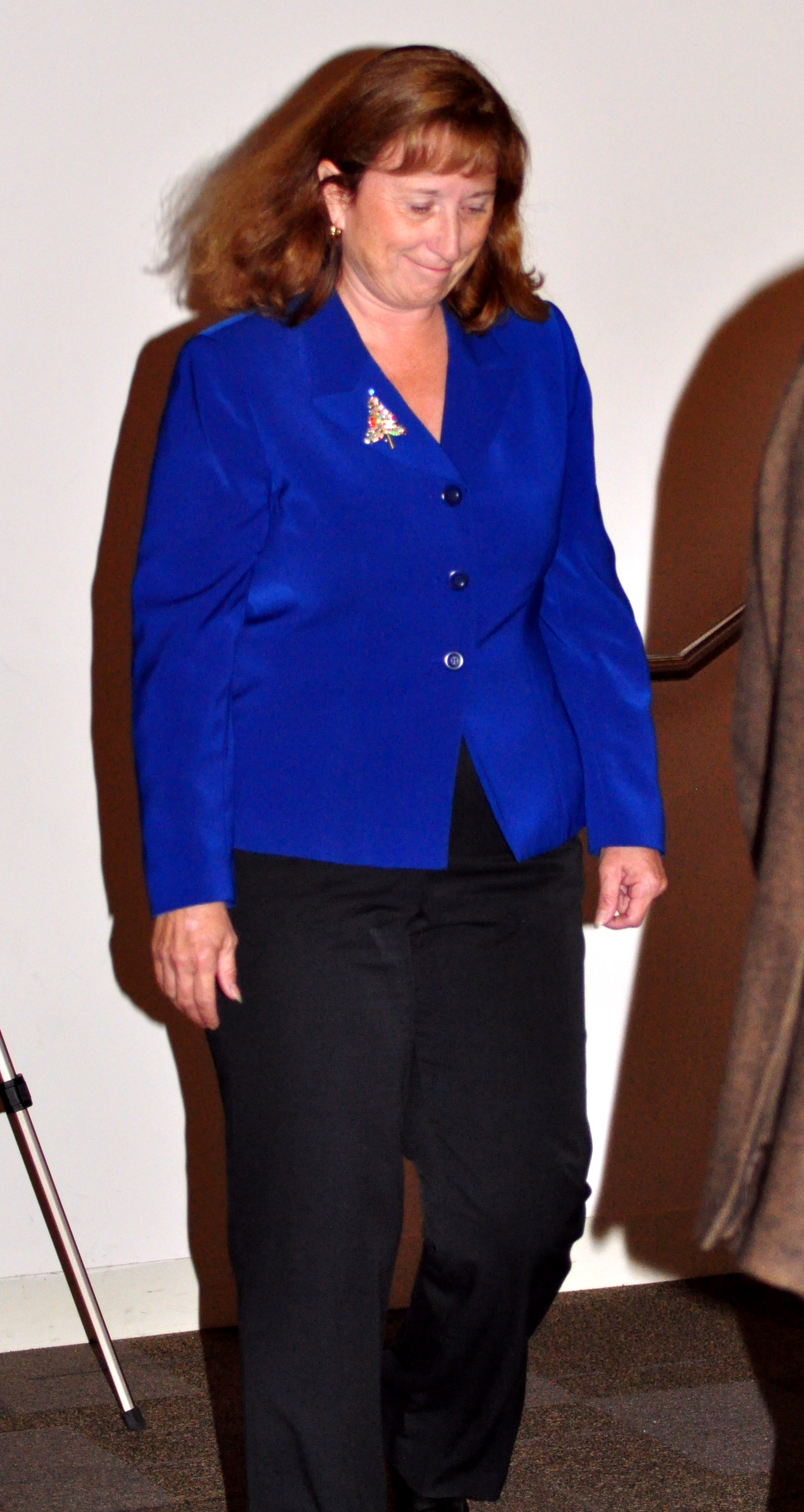
  Ellen Corbett
- Fateh Doe (r), rapper, Punjabi artist
- Chris Eckert (1986–), actor and member of The Groundlings
- Tom Eplin (1960–) (b), actor who played Jake McKinnon on the TV series Another World and As the World Turns
- Andy Ernst (a), music producer, operator of the Art of Ears Studio in Hayward
- Johnny Estrada (1976–) (b), Major League Baseball catcher
- Josh Ryan Evans (1982–2002) (b), actor who played Timmy Lenox on the TV series Passions
- Lewis J. Feldman (1945–) (r), professor at UC Berkeley
- Forrest Fezler (1949–) (b), professional golfer
- Ed Galigher (1950–) (b), National Football League defensive lineman with the San Francisco 49ers
- Michaela Garecht (1979) (b), missing abduction victim
- Oscar Grant (1986–2009) (r,a), victim of BART police officer shooting ruled controversially as involuntary manslaughter
- Chelsea Gray (1992–) (b), professional basketball player
- Ted Griggs, businessman
- Bud Harrelson (1944–2024) (r), Major League Baseball shortstop
- William Dutton Hayward (1815–1891), city founder and namesake

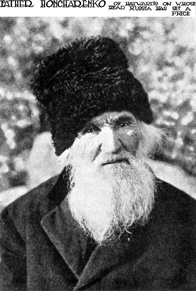
Agapius Honcharenko

- Agapius Honcharenko (1832–1916) (a), Ukrainian patriot and Greek Orthodox priest
- Eddie House (1978–) (r), National Basketball Association player for the Miami Heat
- James Monroe Iglehart (1974–) (b), actor and comic book writer
- J. J. Jelincic (1948–) (a), member of the California Public Employees' Retirement System (CalPERS) board and the past president of the California State Employees Association
- Charlton Jimerson (1979–) (r), Major League Baseball player
- Dwayne Johnson (1972–) (b), a.k.a. "The Rock", professional wrestler (ten-time world champion) and actor
- Tsuyako Kitashima (1918–2006) (b), activist for reparations to victims of the Japanese-American internment during World War II
- Claudia Kolb (1949–) (b), swimmer, Olympic gold medalist in the 1968 Summer Olympics
- Art Larsen (1925–2012) (b), eccentric tennis player, winner of the 1950 U.S. National Championships (now the US Open)
- Michelle Le (1984–2011), nursing student missing from, and allegedly killed at, Hayward's Kaiser Hospital
- Darren Lewis (1967–) (r), Major League Baseball player
- Wes Littleton (1982–) (b), Major League Baseball pitcher with the Seattle Mariners

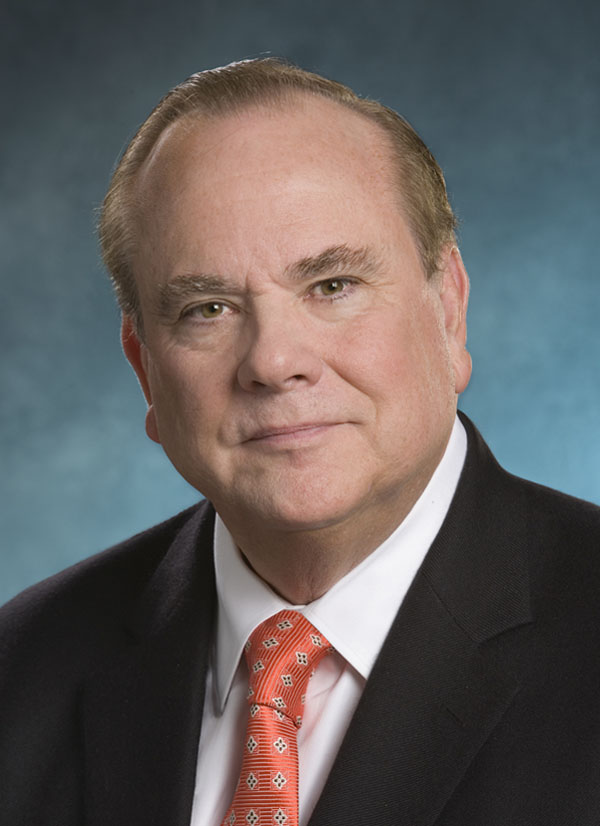
Bill Lockyer

- Bill Lockyer (1941–) (a), California politician, former attorney general, president pro tempore of the State Senate and state treasurer
- Thia Megia (1995–) (b), Filipino-American singer and guitarist, American Idol finalist
- Jon Miller (1951–) (r), ESPN and Major League Baseball announcer
- Amobi Okugo (1991–) (b), soccer player with Philadelphia Union in Major League Soccer
- Bill Owens (1938–) (a), photographer, author of Suburbia, 1976 Guggenheim fellow, founder of Buffalo Bill's Brewery
- Verónica Pérez (1988–) (b), Mexican-American forward for the Mexico women's national football (soccer) team
- Bill Quirk (1946–) (a), California state assemblyman, former Hayward City Council member
- Romesh Ratnesar (1975–) (b), journalist, author, former deputy managing editor at TIME magazine, member of the Council on Foreign Relations
- Mike Reilly (1944–2019) (b), Democratic Sonoma County supervisor

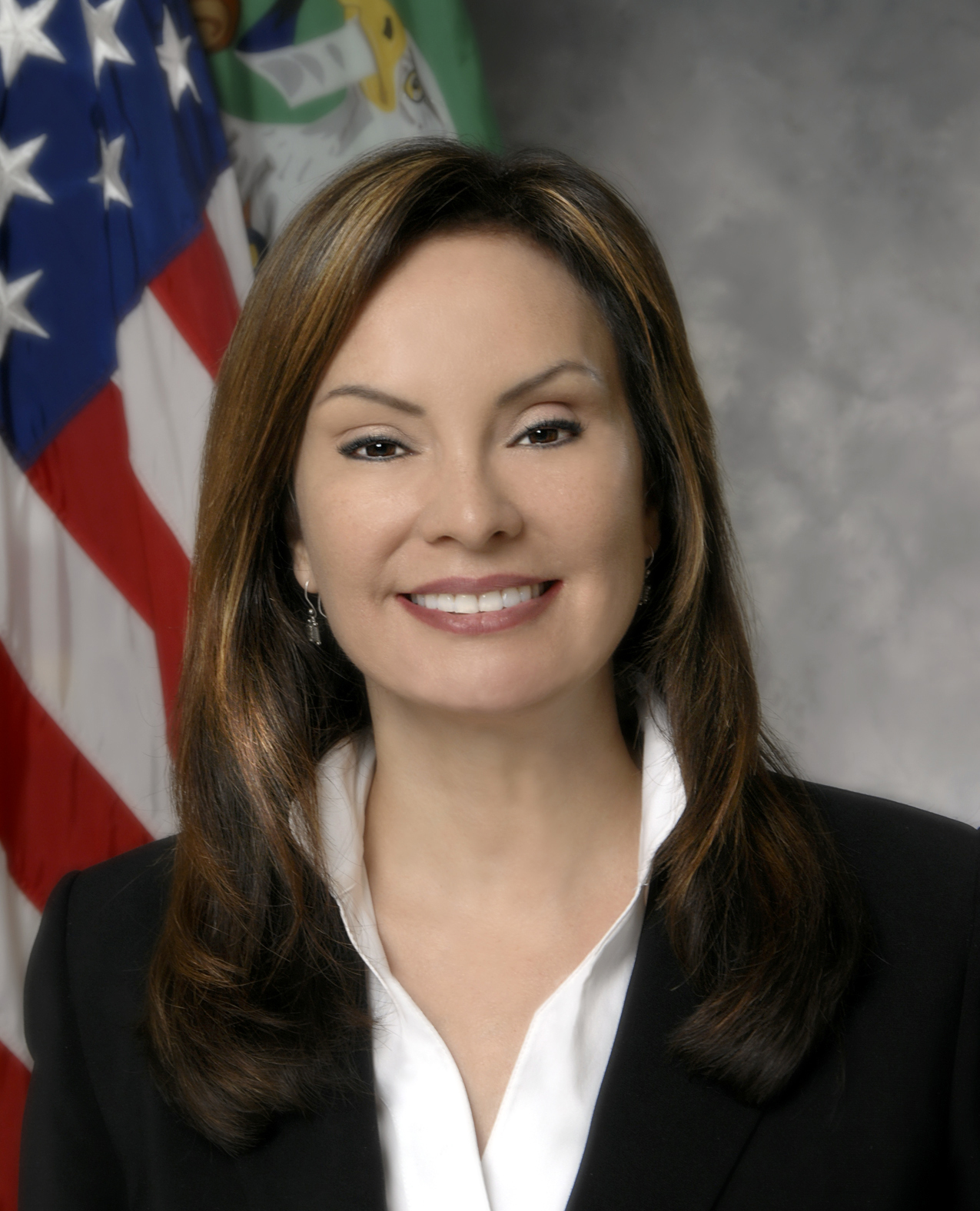
Rosa Gumataotao Rios

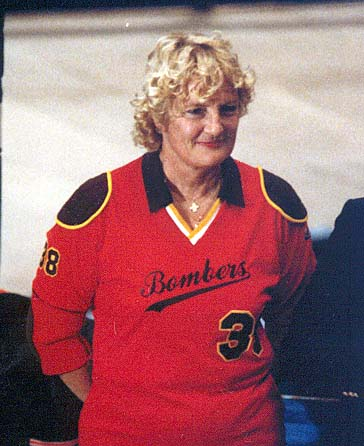
Joan Weston

- Faye Hutchison Resnick (1957–), O.J. Simpson murder trial figure, crowned the Maid of Hayward 1975
- Rosa Gumataotao Rios (1965–) (r), former Treasurer of the United States
- Maud Russell (b) (1893–1989), welfare worker, educator, author
- Steve Sapontzis (1945–), professor emeritus of philosophy at California State University, East Bay
- Saweetie, rapper
- Mary Thomford Sellmer (b. 1902) (b), the first female game warden in California.
- France Silva (1876–1951) (b), first U.S. Marine of Mexican-American and Hispanic heritage to receive the Medal of Honor
- Diamon Simpson (1987–) (r), basketball player in the Israel Basketball Premier League
- Tarik Skubal (1996–) (b), professional baseball pitcher for the Detroit Tigers
- Henry Snyder (1929–2016) (b), professor emeritus of history at the University of California, Riverside
- Sokei-an (1882–1945) (a), Japanese national, founder of the Rinzai Buddhist Society of America
- Spice 1 (1970–) (r), rap musician, active 1991 to present
- Shawn Stasiak (1970–) (b), professional wrestler, World Wrestling Federation / Entertainment fifteen time Hardcore Champion
- Bob Sweikert (1926–1956) (r), racing driver, Indianapolis 500 winner
- Isaiah Taylor (born 1994), basketball player in the Israeli Basketball Premier League
- Erick Threets (1981–) (r), Major League Baseball pitcher
- Don Wakamatsu (1963–) (r), Major League Baseball player and manager
- Bill Walsh (1931–2007) (r), NFL Hall of Fame coach
- Andre Ward (1984–) (r), boxer, light heavyweight gold medalist in the 2004 Olympics, and current WBA World Super Middleweight champion
- Joan Weston (1935–1997) (a), A.K.A. the "Blonde Bomber", famous personality in the original roller derby
- Buddy Woodward (1963–) (r), musician, composer, singer, actor and anime voice performer; member of The Dixie Bee-Liners
- Kristi Yamaguchi (1971–) (b), professional figure skater, Olympic gold medalist and inductee into the U.S. Olympic Hall of Fame
- Mike Young (1960–) (r), professional baseball player
- Hamza Yusuf (1958–) (a), American convert to Islam, Islamic scholar, co-founder of Zaytuna College originally located in Hayward, now in Berkeley
- Goto Zuigan (1879–1965) (a), Japanese Rinzai Buddhist, operated a strawberry farm in Hayward in the early 20th century
