= Flicker (novel) =

1991 novel by Theodore Roszak

- Flicker
- Author: Theodore Roszak
- Illustrator: Rachel McClain
- Language: English
- Genre: Novel
- Publisher: Chicago Review Press
- Publication date: 1991
- Publication place: United States
- Media type: Print (hardback & paperback)
- ISBN: 1-55652-577-X
- OCLC: 58441139

Flicker is a novel by Theodore Roszak published in 1991. The novel follows film scholar Jonathan Gates, whose academic investigations draw him into the world of esoteric conspiracy that underlies the work of the fictional B movie director Max Castle.

== Plot summary ==
Jonathan Gates is a student at UCLA in the early 1960s, where he begins his love affair with film at The Classic, a rundown independent movie theatre. He begins a romance with the theatre's owner Clarissa "Clare" Swann, who tutors him extensively in the study of film history over the course of their relationship. It is through Clare's pursuit of classic films to show at the theater that Gates stumbles upon the work of Max Castle, a German film director whose work uses subliminal imagery and unorthodox symbolism to achieve a powerful effect over the viewer.

Gradually, Gates rises through the academic ranks to achieve a professorial chair, becoming most respected as the rediscoverer and champion of Castle's work. Through Gates' extensive research and travels through Europe, the reader learns of Castle's considerable influence over the great films of his time culminating in an uncredited collaboration with Orson Welles to make the acclaimed movie Citizen Kane, followed by a failed attempt to adapt Conrad's novel Heart of Darkness to the silver screen. Also revealed, however, are Castle's shadowy connections with a religious group known as the Orphans of the Storm, as well as his disappearance in 1941 after being lost at sea and presumed dead in a Nazi U-boat attack during a trip to Europe.

Clare, meanwhile, has become a respected New York film critic, entrusting the Classic theatre to her one-time projectionist Don Sharkey, who stops showing artful films in favor of shallow entertainment for a new generation of moviegoers. Among the up-and-coming directors Sharkey showcases is 18-year-old Simon Dunkle, creator of ultra-low budget exploitation films of unprecedented gore and remarkable popularity among young people. Gates learns Dunkle belongs to the same religious sect as Max Castle. Gates begins to investigate the Orphans, despite their own attempts to stifle his research and the adverse effect that the constant viewing of Orphan-made films is having on his personality. He learns that the Orphans are Gnostic dualists, living in secrecy since the Catholic persecutions of Catharism in the Middle Ages. The Orphans have pioneered revolutionary film techniques, which they subtly employ throughout the film industry by training several generations of film editors. Gates begins to suspect that the Orphans are using their extensive influence in the film industry to subliminally promote their religion while they enact their plans to bring about the Apocalypse in the year 2014 via biological terrorism.

Eventually, Gates turns to his former lover Clare for help. She introduces him to a Father Angelotti. A defrocked Dominican priest, Angelotti was a member of Occulus Dei, a secretive group established by the Catholic Church to investigate and combat the surviving Cathars. Angelotti persuades Gates to 'infiltrate' the Orphans' church, so as to obtain the conclusive evidence that will allow Gates to publish what he has discovered. The Orphans put him on a private plane, ostensibly to meet the elders of their faith. En route, they drug his coffee and he later awakes, imprisoned on a small tropical island in the Indian Ocean. Gates realizes that Angelotti was a double agent, a loyal Cathar who had infiltrated the Catholic church. On the island Gates is fed and tended by a man and woman who seem to not speak English and are restocked by occasional supply boats, but otherwise is trapped without hope of escape.

Living in a nearby hut is none other than Max Castle himself, more than 30 years after his disappearance at the hands of the Cathar cultists. Gates and the film director he once idolised use scraps and castoffs from a waste-heap of old celluloid to splice together one final film, while they wait for Armageddon to come.

== Reception ==
Ty Burr, later film critic for The Boston Globe, reviewing the novel in 1991 for Entertainment Weekly, praised Roszak's writing: "Still best known for 1968's The Making of a Counter Culture, a book that sought to explain '60s youth to an older generation of intellectuals, the writer proves to be a spellbinder when it comes to fiction." The novel was ranked number 33 in Sight and Sound's "100 Great Novels About Cinema." Emphasizing its focus on film and the origins of academic film studies, Publishers Weekly reviewed Flicker as "a quirky, sexy, sprawling novel that combines a magical mystery tour of the history of cinema, an acid satire on Hollywood and what passes for today's cultural avant-garde."

== Potential film adaptation ==
Producers Robert Michael Geisler and John Roberdeau (Streamers, The Thin Red Line) optioned the rights in 1998 and commissioned a screenplay by Dan O'Bannon (Alien, Total Recall), but abandoned the project due to disappointment in the script.

In early 2003, Darren Aronofsky, director of the low-budget success indy production π, signed a three-year contract with Regency Enterprises. One of the first projects mentioned was an adaptation of Flicker. Jim Uhls (best known for his adaptation of Fight Club) was hired to adapt it. In 2006, Aronofsky moved to Universal, and the Flicker project was still in gestation.

The screenplay was reviewed by Mike White of Cashiers du Cinemart, who said that "Roszak's name is misspelled on the cover page. From there, things go downhill... Essentially, Uhls boils down Flicker to a talky tale of movies filled with subliminal signals to fight, fuck, or self-destruct."

== Unproduced stage adaptation ==
"Capering with Ken Campbell", an episode of the BBC Radio 4 program Archive Hour, revealed that Ken Campbell was working on a stage adaptation at the time of his death in 2008. He had previously produced the nine-hour stage adaptation of the cult Illuminatus! novel trilogy by Robert Shea and Robert Anton Wilson for the Royal National Theatre.
