= Robert Briggs (poet) =

American poet

Robert Reese Briggs
- Born: June 11, 1929; Omaha, Nebraska, United States
- Died: May 29, 2015 (aged 85); Portland, Oregon, United States
- Education: Columbia University
- Occupations: Writer, poet
- Years active: 1955–2015
- Movement: Beat Generation

Robert Briggs (1929–2015) was an American author and poet associated with the Beat Generation of San Francisco. He co-founded the San Francisco Book Company, and then Robert Briggs Associates, as a literary agent and small West Coast publisher. His work helped promote and preserve the cultural legacy of postwar American writing.

== Biography ==
Born in New Jersey, Briggs was scouted as a high school football receiver by Auburn University in Alabama. He briefly attended Auburn before leaving, reportedly due to romantic reasons, and was subsequently drafted into military service during the Korean War. He served as a second lieutenant toward the end of the conflict, when he witnessed an atom bomb test in Frenchman Flats, Nevada. (Filmmaker Chel White directed a short film about Briggs' atom bomb experience entitled, The Beats, the Bomb and the 1950s.)

Upon returning to the United States by ship, Briggs developed a lasting affection for the San Francisco Bay Area. Utilizing the benefits of the G.I. Bill, he enrolled at Columbia University in New York, where he formed a lifelong friendship with Peter Matson of Sterling Lazarus Books.

In the 1950s, he was a bookseller in Greenwich Village, New York, and then with Dell Books on the West Coast. Briggs read poetry in the Jazz Cellar in San Francisco in 1957, and said, "jazz is to music what poetry is to knowing." (He continued to give readings accompanied by jazz musicians up until 2012.) He later co-founded the San Francisco Book Company and, in the 1970s, established his own imprint, Robert Briggs Associates. The company was involved in a variety of nonfiction works, including Rolling Thunder: An Exploration into the Powers of an American Indian Medicine Man, by Doug Boyd; as well as works by Joseph Campbell, Colin Wilson, and Theodore Roszak.

He married Barbara Steele of Washington, D.C., in 1962, and the couple lived in San Francisco’s Mission District. Briggs had one daughter, Hillary, born in 1963. Rober and Barbara's marriage ended within a year, but Briggs remained an active and devoted father, residing in North Beach and Cow Hollow.

He met and married Diana Saltoon in the mid-1970s. The couple lived on a houseboat in the San Francisco Bay before relocating to Oregon City and later Scappoose, Oregon. The couple moved to Oregon in the 1980s, where Briggs began work on his book Ruined Time: the 1950s & the Beat. He and Saltoon became affiliated with the Zen community of Oregon, hosting community dinners and Zen gatherings. In 2011, Briggs and Saltoon moved to Mount Vernon, New York, to live with his daughter Hillary and her husband.

Briggs was later diagnosed with Alzheimer’s disease at the Veterans Administration in New York City. Due to his declining health and the challenges of the Northeastern climate, the family returned to Portland, Oregon. Briggs died in May 2015 at the age of 85, receiving in-home hospice care surrounded by close friends and family. He was buried with military honors at Willamette National Cemetery in Portland, Oregon, in recognition of his Korean War service.

== Books ==
=== As author ===
- — (February 1, 1989). The American Emergency: A Search for Spiritual Renewal in an Age of Materialism. Celestial Arts. ISBN 978-0890875469.
- — (January 1, 2006). Ruined Time: The 1950s and the Beat. RBA Publishing. ISBN 978-0931191213.
- —; Saltoon, Diana (2017). Wife, Just Let Go: Zen, Alzheimer's, and Love. Robert Briggs Associates. ISBN 978-0931191206.

=== As publisher ===
- Boyd, Doug (1974). Rolling Thunder: An Exploration into the Powers of an American Indian Medicine Man. ISBN 9780394488868. — published in association with Random House
- Campbell, Joseph (1973). Erotic irony and mythic forms in the art of Thomas Mann. Robert Briggs Associates. ISBN 9780931191091.
- Pelletier, Kenneth R (1976). Mind as Healer: a Holistic Approach to Preventing Stress Disorders. San Francisco: Robert Briggs. ISBN 0440555922. — published in association with Dell Publishing
- Roszak, Theodore (April 1986). Why Astrology Endures. Broadside Edition. Robert Briggs Associates. ISBN 978-0960985098.
- Roszak, Theodore (1988). Fool's Cycle/Full Cycle. Robert Briggs Associates. ISBN 0-931191-07-6.
- Saltoon, Diana (May 2004). Tea and Ceremony: Experiencing Tranquility. Robert Briggs Associates. ISBN 978-0931191183.
- Sätty (1973). Time Zone. ISBN 9780879320676. — published in association with Straight Arrow Books
- Wilson, Colin (1985). The Essential Colin Wilson. Robert Briggs Associates/Celestial Arts. ISBN 9780890874721.
- Wilson, Colin (June 1986). The Laurel & Hardy Theory of Consciousness. Robert Briggs Associates. ISBN 978-0931191046.
- Young, Arthur M. (1976). The Geometry of Meaning. Robert Briggs Associates.
- Young, Arthur M. (January 1985). The Foundations of Science: The Missing Parameter. Robert Briggs Associates. ISBN 978-0931191039.
- Young, Arthur M. (September 1987). The Shakespeare/Bacon Controversy. Broadside Editions. Robert Briggs Associates. ISBN 978-0931191053.

== Audio recordings ==
- Poetry and the 1950s: Homage to the Beat Generation (1999)
- Jazz and Poetry & Other Reasons – Opus One: The Beat Goes On (2007)
- Poetry: A Return to Greenwich Village (2012)
