= Straight Arrow Press =

American publishing company

- Status: Defunct
- Founded: 1967; 59 years ago
- Founders: Jann Wenner and Charles A. Reich
- Defunct: 1993; 33 years ago
- Successor: Wenner Media
- Country of origin: United States
- Headquarters location: (1967–1977) San Francisco, California (1977–1993) New York City
- Distribution: World
- Key people: Alan Rinzler
- Publication types: Magazines (1967–1993); Books (1971–1975)
- Nonfiction topics: Music, Counterculture, Politics
- Revenue: $100 million (1993)
- Owner: Jann Wenner

Straight Arrow Press (Straight Arrow Publishers, Inc.) was a publishing company that was known for the periodical Rolling Stone. Originally based in San Francisco, Straight Arrow published a few other magazines as well as operating a book publishing division in the 1970s, featuring authors such as Oscar Zeta Acosta, Ann Charters, David Dalton, Bob Dylan, Jerry Garcia, Bill Kaysing, Hunter S. Thompson, Roger L. Simon, and the Firesign Theatre.

The book publishing division — which operated from 1971 to c. 1975 — was headed by Alan Rinzler, formerly an editor at Macmillan Inc. The company's first list was partly financed by "selling paperback rights to Bantam before the books were completed."

The company moved from San Francisco to New York City in 1977.

In addition to Rolling Stone, Straight Arrow's publication division published Outside (launched in 1977; sold to another company in 1979), Us Weekly (acquired, in partnership with Lorimar-Telepictures, from The New York Times Company in 1986), Men's Journal (launched 1991), and Family Life (launched 1993).

In 1993, Straight Arrow Press changed its name to Wenner Media.

== Book titles (selected) ==
- Kenneth Anger (1975). Hollywood Babylon. — second U.S. edition; distributed by Simon & Schuster
- Oscar Zeta Acosta (1972). Autobiography of a Brown Buffalo.
- Oscar Zeta Acosta (1973). The Revolt of the Cockroach People.
- Ann Charters (1973). Kerouac.
- David Dalton (1974). James Dean: The Mutant King.
- Vine Deloria Jr. (1971). Of Utmost Good Faith.
- Anthony DeCurtis; James Henke; Holly George-Warren, eds. (1992). The Rolling Stone Album Guide (3rd ed.). New York City. ISBN 978-0679737292.
- Mark James Estren (1974). A History of Underground Comics. ISBN 978-0879320751. — distributed by Quick Fox; later re-published by Ronin Publishing
- The Firesign Theatre (1972). The Firesign Theatre's Big Book of Plays. ISBN 978-0-87932-028-7.
- The Firesign Theatre (1974). The Firesign Theatre's Big Mystery Joke Book.
- Jerry Garcia; Jann Wenner (1972). Garcia: A Signpost to New Space.— re-issued by Da Capo Press in 2003
- Bill Kaysing (1971). The Ex-urbanite's Complete & Illustrated Easy-does-it First-time Farmer's Guide: A Useful Book. OCLC 162589.
- Bill Kaysing (1973). The Ex-urbanite's Complete & Illustrated Easy-does-it First-time Farmer's Guide: A Useful Book (Revised ed.). ISBN 0-87932-047-8.
- Annie Leibovitz, ed. (1973). Shooting Stars: the Rolling Stones Book of Portraits.
- Bill Owens (1973). Suburbia.
- Bruce Rodgers (1972). The Queens' Vernacular – A Gay Lexicon. ISBN 0879320265. OCLC 508274.
- Sätty (1971). The Cosmic Bicycle. ASIN B0006D0CG8.
- Sätty (1973). Time Zone. ISBN 9780879320676. — published in association with Robert Briggs Associates
- Ze'ev Schiff (1974). A History of the Israeli Army (1870–1974). ISBN 0-87932-077-X.
- Roger L. Simon (1973). The Big Fix. ISBN 978-0879320485.
- Ralph Steadman (1974). America. — introduction by Hunter S. Thompson
- Hunter S. Thompson (1973). Fear and Loathing on the Campaign Trail '72. ISBN 978-0-87932-053-9. OCLC 636410.
- Jann Wenner (1971). Lennon Remembers: The Rolling Stone Interviews. ISBN 978-1859843765.
