= Theodore Roszak (scholar) =

American social historian, critic and writer

- Roszak, late 1960s
- Born: November 15, 1933; Chicago, Illinois, U.S.
- Died: July 5, 2011 (aged 77); Berkeley, California, U.S.
- Education: University of California, Los Angeles (BA); Princeton University (PhD)
- Occupations: Author; historian; professor
- Spouse: Betty Roszak
- Writing career
- Subjects: History; Counterculture of the 1960s
- Notable work: The Making of a Counter Culture

Theodore Roszak (November 15, 1933 – July 5, 2011) was an American academic and novelist who concluded his academic career as Professor Emeritus of history at California State University, East Bay. He is best known for his 1969 text The Making of a Counter Culture.

== Biography ==
Roszak was born in Chicago, Illinois in 1933 to Anton and Blanche Roszak. The name Roszak is of Polish origin. His parents were Roman Catholic; his father was a cabinet maker and his mother was a homemaker. Roszak attended Chicago public schools.

Roszak completed his B.A. from University of California, Los Angeles in 1955. He then received his Ph.D. in history from Princeton University in 1958 after completing a doctoral dissertation titled "Thomas Cromwell and the Henrican reformation."

His academic career began by teaching at Stanford University from 1958 to 1963 before joining Cal State Hayward. During the 1960s, he lived in London, where he edited the newspaper Peace News from 1964 to 1965. He also taught as a visiting professor at San Francisco State University in 1981 and Schumacher College in 1991. He was featured prominently in the "Alternative Lifestyles in California" episode of the 1977 BBC television series, The Long Search.

His writing career began in 1966 when he started contributing to The Nation and The Atlantic.

Theodore Roszak died at age 77 at his home in Berkeley, California, on July 5, 2011.

== Scholarship ==
Roszak first came to public prominence in 1969, with the publication of his The Making of a Counter Culture which chronicled and gave explanation to the European and North American counterculture of the 1960s. He is generally credited with the first use of the term "counterculture". According to historian Todd Gitlin, "People were trying to figure out, 'What is this thing that has come upon us?' He named it".

Other books include Where the Wasteland Ends, The Voice of the Earth (in which he coined the term for the budding field of Ecopsychology), Person/Planet, The Cult of Information, The Gendered Atom: Reflections on the Sexual Psychology of Science, and Longevity Revolution: As Boomers Become Elders. He also co-edited (with Mary Gomes and Allen Kanner) the anthology Ecopsychology: Healing the Mind, Restoring the Earth, and (with his wife Betty) the anthology Masculine/Feminine: Essays on Sexual Mythology and the Liberation of Women.

== Fiction ==
His fiction includes a cult novel on the "secret history" of the cinema titled Flicker (Simon and Schuster, Bantam Books and Chicago Review Press) and the award-winning Memoirs of Elizabeth Frankenstein (Random House and Bantam Books). In a 1995 interview with Publishers Weekly, Roszak said, "For me, nonfiction was a detour I took on the way to fiction," and "But writing fiction is like working without a net, and it took me a long time to write something that was good enough to be published. When opportunities to write nonfiction came along, I took them. [...] But if things had turned out the way I wanted, I would always have been a novelist." His final novel, published in 2003, is The Devil and Daniel Silverman.

== Awards and honors ==
- New York Open Center in 1999 for his "Prescient and Influential Analysis of American Culture"
- Guggenheim Fellow and was twice nominated for the National Book Award.
- 1995 Tiptree Award for The Memoirs of Elizabeth Frankenstein
- 2009 Grand prix de l'Imaginaire for Foreign Language Novel, The Crystal Child: A Story of the Buried Life

== Publications ==
=== Non-fiction ===
- The Dissenting Academy (1968)
- The Making of a Counter Culture (Doubleday & Company, 1969)
- Masculine/Feminine: Readings in Sexual Mythology and the Liberation of Women (1969)
- Where the Wasteland Ends (1972)
- Sources (1972)
- Unfinished Animal: The Aquarian Frontier and the Evolution of Consciousness (1975)
- Person/Planet: The Creative Disintegration of Industrial Society (1979)
- From Satori to Silicon Valley (1986)
- — (1986). The Cult of Information: The Folklore of Computers and the True Art of Thinking. University of California Press. ISBN 9780520085848.
- Why Astrology Endures. Broadside Editions. Robert Briggs Associates. 1986. ISBN 9780960985098.
- Fool's Cycle/Full Cycle (Robert Briggs Associates, 1988) ISBN 0-931191-07-6
- The Voice of the Earth (1992); 2nd edition (2001), Phanes Press, ISBN 978-1890482800
- The Cult of Information: A Neo-Luddite Treatise on High Tech, Artificial Intelligence, and the True Art of Thinking (1994) 2nd edition
- The Gendered Atom (1999)
- Kanner, Roszak, & Gomes. Ecopsychology: Restoring the Earth, Healing the Mind. Sierra Club Books (1995) ISBN 0-87156-406-8
- World Beware! American Triumphalism in an Age of Terror (Between The Lines, 2006, ISBN 1-897071-02-7)
- The Making of an Elder Culture: Reflections on the Future of America's Most Audacious Generation. (New Society Publishers, 2009) ISBN 978-0-86571-661-2

=== Essays ===
- "Birth of an Old Generation"
- "When the Counterculture Counted
- "Raging Against the Machine: In its '1984' Commercial, Apple Suggested that its Computers Would Smash Big Brother. But Technology Gave Him More Control." Los Angeles Times, January 28, 2004.

=== Fiction ===
- Pontifex (1974)
- Bugs (1981)
- Dreamwatcher (1985)
- Flicker (1991)
- The Memoirs of Elizabeth Frankenstein (1995)
- The Devil and Daniel Silverman (2003) Leapfrog. ISBN 0-9679520-7-7
- The Crystal Child: A Story of the Buried Life (2013). Posth.

== Sources ==
- Fantastic Fiction

Media offices
Preceded by Hugh Brock	Editor of Peace News; 1964–1965	Succeeded by Rod Prince
