= Mary Thomford Sellmer =

Game warden (born 1902)

Mary Hamilton Thomford Sellmer (born September 7, 1902) was the first female game warden in California.

== Early life ==
Mary Hamilton Thomford was born in Hayward, California, on September 7, 1902, the daughter of John William Thomford (December 15, 1866 - May 21, 1957) and Mary Hamilton.

== Career ==
On November 22, 1927, Mary Thomford Sellmer was appointed Deputy Game Warden of Marin County, becoming the first woman to be a game warden in California and the only one in the world in the 1920s. She acted under the supervision of her husband, Captain Walter B. Sellmer of the California Fish and Game Commission. She was not an "honorary officer" like other women before her, but a full-fledged game warden. In the first year after her appointment she arrested forty-seven violators of the game laws. She was an expert rifle and pistol shot.

In 1929 she was featured in the July number of American Forests.

She was a member of the Associated Sportsmen's Club of California and the Marin Rod and Gun Club.

== Personal life ==
On January 8, 1923, at Hayward, California, Mary Thomford married Captain Walter Bruno Sellmer (May 16, 1891 - August 20, 1982) and they had one son, William Ross Sellmer (1923-1984). Later Walter Sellmer became Sheriff of Marin County.

She lived at 230 Forest Ave., Fairfax, California.

In 1940 she filed for divorce on dual charges of desertion and extreme cruelty and asked custody of their 16-years-old son and $100 monthly alimony and support for the child.
