= Bill Owens (photographer) =

American photographer and brewer (born 1938)

- Born: September 25, 1938 (age 87); San Jose, California, U.S.
- Education: Chico State College
- Occupations: Photographer; photojournalist; brewer; editor; publisher
- Known for: Suburbia (1973)
- Awards: Guggenheim Fellowship (1976)
- Website: billowens.com

Bill Owens (born September 25, 1938) is an American photographer, photojournalist, brewer and editor living in Hayward, California. He is best known for his photographs of suburban domestic scenes taken in the East Bay and published in the book Suburbia (1973). Owens is the recipient of a Guggenheim Fellowship and two National Endowment for the Arts Grants.

According to The New York Sun, "Owens is uniquely associated with suburbanites living in the tract housing developments that absorbed 60 million Americans in the decades following World War II."

== Biography ==
Owens was born in San Jose, California and raised on a farm in Citrus Heights. He studied visual anthropology at San Francisco State College, dropped out and went on an around-the-world hitchhiking trip before finishing his education at Chico State College. He served in the Peace Corps in Jamaica and, upon returning to the US, lived and worked in the town of Livermore in the San Francisco Bay Area, as a staff photographer for a local newspaper.

In 1973, Owens released the book Suburbia, whose pictures showed American suburban life in Livermore. Art Seidenbaum wrote in the Los Angeles Times that the book was "a sort of black-and-white documentary which roused pity, contempt, laughter and self-recognition in me. Like Walker Evans' memorable photographic study of the Depression, you know these people are real. And what saves journalist Owens from being a snob or voyeur is that he includes himself in their middle-class midst." Ian Jeffrey later noted that "Owens's influence was immense during the 1970s, especially with respect to the kind of portraiture-by-agreement on show here." In 2001, Suburbia was included in Andrew Roth's The Book of 101 Books: Seminal Photographic Books of the Twentieth Century.

He has published other photography books, and his photographs have been exhibited internationally and are in the collections of the Museum of Modern Art, Berkeley Art Museum, Los Angeles County Museum of Art, San Francisco Museum of Modern Art, Los Angeles Museum of Contemporary Art, San Jose Museum of Art and the Getty Museum in Los Angeles.

Owens went on to become a well-known beer brewer and publisher of American Brewer magazine. He founded Buffalo Bill's Brewery in Hayward in 1983, one of the first brewpubs to open in California since prohibition. In 2003, he founded the American Distilling Institute, a professional membership organization, and publishing house "to promote and defend the art and enterprise of craft distilling." As the president of ADI, Owens has become one of the leading spokesmen of the craft distilling movement.

== Bibliography ==
- Suburbia. San Francisco: Straight Arrow, 1973. ISBN 978-0-87932-043-0, ISBN 978-0-87932-042-3
  - Suburbia. Revised and augmented. New York: Fotofolio, 1999. ISBN 978-1-881270-40-9.
- Our Kind of People: American Groups and Rituals. 1975. ISBN 978-0-87932-084-3, ISBN 978-0-87932-085-0.
- Working: I Do It for the Money. New York: Simon and Schuster, 1977. ISBN 978-0-671-22820-0, ISBN 978-0-671-22782-1
  - Working. Revised and augmented. New York: Fotofolio, 2009. ISBN 978-1-58418-125-5.
- Documentary Photography: A Personal View. Danbury, New Hampshire: Addison House, 1978. ISBN 978-0-89169-037-5.
- Publish Your Own Photo Book. Livermore, California: Morgan & Morgan, 1979. ISBN 978-0-9602462-0-5
- How to Build a Small Brewery: Draft Beer in Ten Days. 1982. ISBN 978-0-9602462-7-4.
- Leisure. New York: Fotofolio, 2005. ISBN 978-1-58418-074-6.
- Bill Owens. Anthology. Bologna: Damiani, 2008. By Claudia Zanfi, with an introduction by A. M. Homes and photographs and afterword by Owens. ISBN 978-88-6208-017-0.
- Craft of Whiskey Distilling. Hayward, California: American Distilling Institute, 2008. OCLC 1043326099.
  - Craft of Whiskey Distilling. Revised edition. Hayward, California: American Distilling Institute, 2013. ISBN 978-0-9824055-1-2
- The Village: Bill Owens – Jamaica Peace Corps Photographs 1964–66. True North, 2014. Edited by Geir Jordahl, Kate Jordahl, and John Thacker. With an introduction by Victoria Sheridan and an afterword by Geir Jordahl. ISBN 978-0-9899915-1-3.
- The Nano Distillery: The Future of Distilling. Hayward, California: White Mule, 2018. ISBN 978-1-7322354-0-3.
- Cars: A Completely American Reality. Bellingham, Washington: True North, 2012. ISBN 978-1-943013-23-4.
- Altamont to America: Bill Owens and the Legacy of Suburbia: Photographs 1964–2020. Bellingham, Washington: True North, 2018. ISBN 978-1-943013-16-6
- Altamont 1969. Bologna: Damiani, 2019. ISBN 978-88-6208-623-3.

== Awards ==
- 1976: Guggenheim Fellowship, John Simon Guggenheim Memorial Foundation
- Two National Endowment for the Arts Grants.

== Exhibitions ==
- San Jose Museum of Art, San Jose, CA. A retrospective
