= Buffalo Bill's Brewery =

Brewery in California

Buffalo Bill's
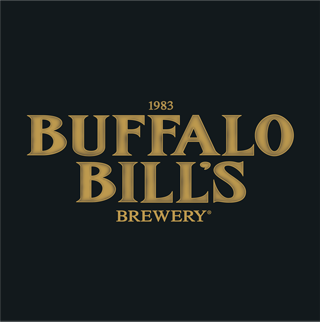
- Type: Private
- Industry: Alcoholic beverage
- Founded: 1983; 43 years ago
- Headquarters: Hayward, California
- Products: Beer
- Owner: Geoff Harries, Licensed to Alejandro Gamarra
- Website: buffalobillsbrewery.com

Buffalo Bill's Brewery is an American brewpub in Hayward, California, notable for being the first brewpub in America. Buffalo Bill's opened its doors on September 9, 1983, and brewed its first batch of beer on August 2, 1983. In 2018, Buffalo Bill's was inducted into the Smithsonian American History Museum as one of the most historic brewpubs in America.

== History and influence ==
Before 1983, it was illegal for a brewer to sell directly to the consumer. In 1982, Assemblyman Tom Bates wrote California Assembly Bill 3610, which would allow brewers to sell directly to consumers provided food was served. On January 1, 1983, it was signed into law, and the term "brewpub" was officially coined.

Buffalo Bill's was founded in 1983 by Bill Owens, a Guggenheim Fellowship photographer, and in 1994, the brewery was purchased by then brewer Geoff Harries.

Buffalo Bill's is credited with creating the beer styles Amber ale (Buffalo Amber, 1983), Pumpkin ale (1986), and Double IPA (Hearty Ale, 1987). Owens is also credited with creating one of the first craft IPAs in 1987, the Alimony Ale. Slogans for the Alimony Ale included "The Bitterest Beer in America" and "It's Irreconcilably Different". Buffalo Bill's impact on the burgeoning craft beer movement was noted in Playboy magazine: "[Owens has] taken a very ordinary beverage, brewed it in an offbeat manner, and come up with some highly select idiosyncratic beer. How about pumpkin ale made with mashed pumpkins? Or a beer he calls Tasmanian Devil because it's made with Tasmanian hops." Newsweek recognized Owen's efforts towards "legislation that could open the spigots for a nationwide surge of brewpubs and microbreweries."

Buffalo Bill's closed on June 2, 2022, due to rising business costs and the COVID-19 pandemic. The business reopened on August 7, 2023, under new ownership.

== Publications ==
Prior to opening Buffalo Bill's, Owens authored the book How to Build A Small Brewery in 1981. It was revised and expanded in 1989, and again in 1992 in collaboration with Harries. By this time it had sold over 30,000 copies. With the introduction of How to Build a Small Brewery, many home brewers switched from extract brewing to grain brewing—a significant advancement in homebrewing for its time. In addition to How to Build a Small Brewery, Owens also published American Brewer Magazine, Beer the Magazine, The Brewpub Manual, and a series of maps which chronicled the early craft beer movement in Northern California, from within Buffalo Bill's.

== See also ==
- List of California breweries
- Beer in the United States
- List of microbreweries
- Brewers Association
