= The Making of a Counter Culture =

1969 book by Theodore Roszak

- Author: Theodore Roszak
- Language: English
- Genre: Non-fiction
- Publisher: University of California Press
- Publication date: 1969
- Publication place: United States
- OCLC: 23039

The Making of a Counter Culture: Reflections on the Technocratic Society and Its Youthful Opposition is a work of non-fiction by Theodore Roszak originally published by Doubleday & Co. in 1969.

Roszak "first came to public prominence in 1969, with the publication of his The Making of a Counterculture" which chronicled and gave explanation to the European and North American counterculture of the 1960s. The term "counterculture" was first used by Roszak in this book.

The Making of a Counter Culture "captured a huge audience of Vietnam War protesters, dropouts, and rebels--and their baffled elders. Theodore Roszak found common ground between 1960s student radicals and hippie dropouts in their mutual rejection of what he calls the technocracy--the regime of corporate and technological expertise that dominates industrial society. He traces the intellectual underpinnings of the two groups in the writings of Herbert Marcuse and Norman O. Brown, Allen Ginsberg and Paul Goodman."
