= Wilfried Sätty =

German graphic artist (1939–1982)

Sätty
- Born: Wilfried Podriech; April 12, 1939; Bremen, Germany
- Died: January 31, 1982 (aged 42); 2141 Powell Street, San Francisco, California, United States
- Style: collage

Wilfried Sätty (German pronunciation: [ˈvɪlfʁiːt ˈzɛti]; born Wilfried Podriech; April 12, 1939 – January 31, 1982) was a German graphic artist best known for his black and white collage art.

== Biography ==
Born in Bremen, Germany, Sätty lived through multiple Allied bombings of Germany during World War II. Sätty moved to San Francisco in 1965 where he got a job at Bay Area Rapid Transit as a draftsman.

He released two collage volumes, The Cosmic Bicycle (Straight Arrow Books, 1971) and Time Zone (Straight Arrow Books, 1973), as well as a number of other collections.

He died in 1982 from "a fall from a ladder while inebriated." Sätty's final work was published in 2007 by the recipient of his estate, architect and art historian Walter Medeiros, as Visions of Frisco: an Imaginative Depiction of San Francisco during the Gold Rush & the Barbary Coast Era.

His works have been exhibited at the San Francisco Museum of Modern Art, the Museum of Modern Art, the Museum of Fine Arts, Boston, and the National Museum, Warsaw.
