= John Milton Yinger =

American sociologist

- Born: July 25, 1916; Quincy, Michigan
- Died: July 28, 2011 (aged 95); Oberlin, Ohio
- Occupation: American sociologist

John Milton Yinger (July 6, 1916 – July 28, 2011) was an American sociologist who was president of the American Sociological Association 1976–1977. Yinger received his Ph.D. from the University of Wisconsin, Madison, in 1942, and was emeritus Professor of Sociology at Oberlin College.

== Biography ==
Yinger was born in Quincy, Michigan, in 1916. His parents, George and Emma Bancroft Yinger, were both Methodist ministers. He grew up with five brothers and two sisters. Under the direction of his father, he and various combinations of his siblings sang in hundreds of concerts as the Yinger Singers. Yinger studied sociology at DePauw University, and continued to sing with his siblings. At university, was part of the athletics track team, running flat races and hurdles, at one point racing against Jesse Owens. After graduating from DePauw, Yinger received a master's degree from Louisiana State University and a doctorate from the University of Wisconsin. While he was a student at Wisconsin, he met his future bride, Winnie McHenry. There were married in 1941 and remained so for 61 years, until she died in 2002.

=== Career ===
Yinger began his professional career at Ohio Wesleyan University. He moved to Oberlin College in 1947 and remained there until he retired in 1987. In addition to being a professor of sociology and anthropology, Yinger was an author, writing 13 books and a number of journal articles. His textbook co-authored with George E. Simpson, Racial and Cultural Minorities, went through five editions and won the 1959 Anisfield-Wolf Book Award for the best scholarly work on race relations. The award was shared with Martin Luther King Jr. Yinger's writing appeared in the 1960 American Sociological Review, in which he originated the concept of a "contraculture". He defined this as a group whose values contain "as a primary element, a theme of conflict with the values of the total society." Yinger's work on this topic culminated with the 1982 publication of his book, Countercultures: The Promise and Peril of a World Turned Upside Down. Yinger was elected president of the American Sociological Association for 1976–77. He received honorary degrees from DePauw and Syracuse University and was a Guggenheim Fellow, a Fellow of the National Endowment for the Humanities, and a Fellow of Clare Hall at Cambridge University.

== Personal life ==
Yinger had three children: Susan, John, and Nancy. He had five grandchildren and four great-grandchildren. He died in Oberlin, Ohio on July 28, 2011, with his daughter, Susan, at his side. His son John McHenry Yinger is a professor of Economics and Public Administration and International Affairs at the Maxwell School of Citizenship and Public Affairs of Syracuse University.

== Works ==
- Religion in the Struggle for Power: a Study in the Sociology of Religion (1946) Durham, NC: Duke University Press.
- Religion, Society, and the Individual: an Introduction to the Sociology of Religion. (1957) New York : Macmillan.
- Toward A Field Theory of Behavior: Personality and Social Structure (1965) New York, McGraw-Hill.
- Countercultures: The Promise and Peril of a World Turned Upside Down (1982) New York: Free Press; London: Collier Macmillan Publisher.
- Racial and Cultural Minorities: An Analysis of Prejudice and Discrimination (1985). 5th ed. New York: Plenum Press. Co-authored with George Eaton Simpson.
- Ethnicity: Source of Strength? Source of Conflict? (1994) Albany, NY: State University of New York Press.

== See also ==
- Sociology of religion
- Structural functionalism
