= Suburbia (book) =

Book by Bill Owens

- First edition cover
- Author: Bill Owens
- Subject: photojournalism
- Publisher: Straight Arrow Press
- Publication date: 1973 (revised 1999)

Suburbia is a book by Bill Owens, a photojournalism monograph on suburbia, published in 1973 by Straight Arrow Press, the former book publishing imprint of Rolling Stone. A revised edition was published in 1999 by Fotofolio (ISBN 978-1-881270-40-9).

== Background ==
Owens primarily photographed residents of Livermore, California as a photographer for Livermore Independent News. Most of the images are black-and-white, shot with a wide-angle lens, and paired with captions drawn from the subjects' own words.

== Response ==
Art Seidenbaum wrote in the Los Angeles Times that the book was:

"a sort of black-and-white documentary which roused pity, contempt, laughter and self-recognition in me. Like Walker Evans' memorable photographic study of the Depression, you know these people are real. And what saves journalist Owens from being a snob or voyeur is that he includes himself in their middle-class midst."

Ian Jeffrey later noted that:

"Owens's influence was immense during the 1970s, especially with respect to the kind of portraiture-by-agreement on show here."

In 2001, Suburbia was included in Andrew Roth's The Book of 101 Books: Seminal Photographic Books of the Twentieth Century.
