= List of German artists =

Artists of Germany include:

== A ==
- Tomma Abts
- Heinrich Aldegrever
- Elisabeth von Adlerflycht
- Albrecht Altdorfer
- Kai Althoff
- Markus Amm
- Gerd Aretz
- Jean Arp
- Artists Anonymous
- Asam brothers
- Cosmas Damian Asam
- Egid Quirin Asam
- Isidor Ascheim
- Jim Avignon

== B ==
- Johannes Baader
- Caroline Bardua
- Michael Bauer
- Johann Wolfgang Baumgartner
- Barthel Beham
- Wilfried Behre
- Hans Bellmer
- Ella Bergmann-Michel
- Joseph Beuys
- Anna and Bernhard Blume
- Bärbel Bohley
- Eberhard Bosslet
- Erwin Bowien
- Pola Brändle
- Jörg Breu the Elder
- Jörg Breu the Younger
- Heinrich Brocksieper
- Philip Bußmann
- Hans Burgkmair
- Michael Buthe

== C ==
- Niclas Castello
- Dorothea Chandelle
- Johann Joseph Christian
- Shane Cooper
- Charles Crodel
- Paul Eduard Crodel

== D ==
- Dietmar Damerau
- Wilm Dedeke
- Christel Dillbohner
- Johann Melchior Dinglinger
- Otto Dix
- Louise Droste-Roggemann
- Albrecht Dürer
- Bernhard Dilling

== E ==
- Otto Eckmann
- Martin Eder
- Erwin Eisch
- Knut Ekwall
- Max Ernst
- Kota Ezawa

== F ==
- Ludwig Fahrenkrog
- Lyonel Feininger
- Feuchtmayer
- Johann Michael Feuchtmayer the Elder
- Franz Xaver Feuchtmayer the Younger
- Franz Joseph Feuchtmayer
- Franz Xaver Feuchtmayer
- Johann Michael Feuchtmayer
- Joseph Anton Feuchtmayer
- Michael Feuchtmayer
- Caroline Auguste Fischer
- Karl von Fischer
- Ferdinand Wolfgang Flachenecker
- Regina Frank
- Elsa von Freytag-Loringhoven
- Johnny Friedlaender
- Caspar David Friedrich
- Stephan Fritsch
- Daniel and Geo Fuchs
- David Füleki

== G ==
- Tatjana Gamerith
- Wolfgang Ganter
- Yishay Garbasz
- Heinrich Gätke
- Isa Genzken
- Sigfried Giedion
- Willi Glasauer
- Mathias Goeritz
- Ekkeland Götze
- Henry Gowa
- Carl Grossberg
- Dieter Grossmann
- Matthias Grünewald
- Ignaz Günther
- Matthäus Günther
- Andreas Gursky

== H ==
- Hans Haacke
- Karl Hagedorn (German-American painter)
- Alfred 23 Harth
- Kati Heck
- Wilhelm Heine
- Bettina Heinen-Ayech
- Carola Helbing-Erben
- Amalia von Helvig
- Ingrid Hermentin
- Augustin Hirschvogel
- Hannah Höch
- Heinrich Hoerle
- Hans Holbein the Elder
- Herbert Holzing
- Ottmar Hörl
- Rebecca Horn
- Karl Hubbuch
- JoKarl Huber
- Johann Erdmann Hummel
- Maria Innocentia Hummel
- Otto Hupp

== J ==
- Jaan Patterson
- Janosch
- Horst Janssen
- Wolfgang Joop

== K ==
- Johann Joachim Kändler
- Wolf Kahlen
- Leo Kahn
- Johannes Kahrs (artist)
- Hanns-Christian Kaiser
- Johanna Keimeyer
- Hans Kemmer
- George Kenner
- Georg Friedrich Kersting
- Ludwig Kieninger
- Martin Kippenberger
- Paul Klee
- Leo von Klenze
- Mario Klingemann
- Erich Klossowski
- August Klotz
- Käthe Kollwitz
- Thomas Köner
- Rudolf Kortokraks
- Michael Krebber
- Gerhard von Kügelgen
- Susanne Kühn
- Diether Kunerth
- Veit Laurent Kurz

== L ==
- Ulf Langheinrich
- Rainer Maria Latzke
- Andrea Lehmann
- Heinrich Leutemann
- Max Liebermann
- Elfriede Lohse-Wächtler
- Lore Lorentz
- Markus Lüpertz
- Bernd Luz
- Walter Lenck

== M ==
- August Macke
- Alfred Mahlau
- Eduard Magnus
- Franz Marc
- Leo Marchutz
- Master of the Housebook
- Master L. Cz.
- Petra Mattheis
- Christoph Meckel
- Ada Mee
- Johann Peter Melchior
- Adolph Menzel
- Gerhard Mevissen
- Alice Michaelis
- Amud Uwe Millies
- Paula Modersohn-Becker
- Una H. Moehrke
- Manfred Mohr
- Georg Mühlberg
- Wolfgang Müller
- Gabriele Münter

== N ==
- Georg Nees
- Renee Nele
- Gert Neuhaus
- Thomas Neumann
- Natias Neutert

== O ==
- Markus Oehlen
- Karl Oenike
- Méret Oppenheim

== P ==
- Constantin Prozorov
- Louise Pagenkopf
- Otto Pankok
- Bruno Paul
- Paul Eddie Pfisterer
- Otto Piene
- Friedrich Preller
- Paul Preuning
- Karin Putsch-Grassi

== R ==
- Neo Rauch
- Sandra Rauch
- Margaretha Reichardt
- Mirko Reisser (DAIM)
- Alfred Rethel
- Ottilie Reylaender
- Gerhard Richter
- Henry James Richter
- Hans Richter
- Tilman Riemenschneider
- Dieter Roth
- Christoph Ruckhäberle
- Julika Rudelius

== S ==
- August Sander
- Hanns Scharff
- Silke Schatz
- Caroline Friederike von Schlözer
- Ingrid Schmeck
- Walter Schönenbröcher
- Adolf Schreyer
- Simon Schubert
- Emil Schult
- Eberhard Schulze
- Thomas Schütte
- Simon Schwartz (artist)
- Kurt Schwitters
- Franz Wilhelm Seiwert
- Gert Sellheim
- Friederike Sieburg
- Zuzanna Skiba
- Florian Slotawa
- Conrad von Soest
- Virgil Solis
- Kathrin Sonntag
- Michael Sowa
- Franz Joseph Spiegler
- Bodo Sperling
- Hans Starcke
- Birgit Stauch
- Hans Steinbach
- Johannes Stenrat
- Veit Stoss
- Johann Baptist Straub
- Madeleine Strindberg
- Gunta Stölzl
- Peter Eduard Stroehling
- Erika Stürmer-Alex

== T ==
- Ruben Talberg
- Ulrike Theusner
- Elsa Thiemann
- Elisabeth Treskow
- Susanne Tunn
- Rosemarie Trockel

== U ==
- Ulay

== V ==
- van Ray
- Various & Gould
- Markus Vater
- Peter Vischer the Elder
- Wolf Vostell

== W ==
- Carl Wagner (painter)
- Grete Waldau
- Horst Walter
- Johann Jakob Walther
- Karl Walther
- Petrus Wandrey
- A. Paul Weber
- Karl Josef Weinmair
- Victor Weisz
- Ralf Winkler
- Adolf Wissel,
- Herma Auguste Wittstock
- Henry Otto Wix
- Gert Heinrich Wollheim
- Paul Wunderlich

== Y ==
- Barbara Yelin

== Z ==
- Gabriel Zehender
- Ernst Zehle
- Adolf Ziegler
- Gottfried and Thekla Zielke
- Hans Dieter Zingraff
- Johann Baptist Zimmermann
- Thomas Zipp
