= Henry Otto Wix =

German-born American painter (1866–1922)

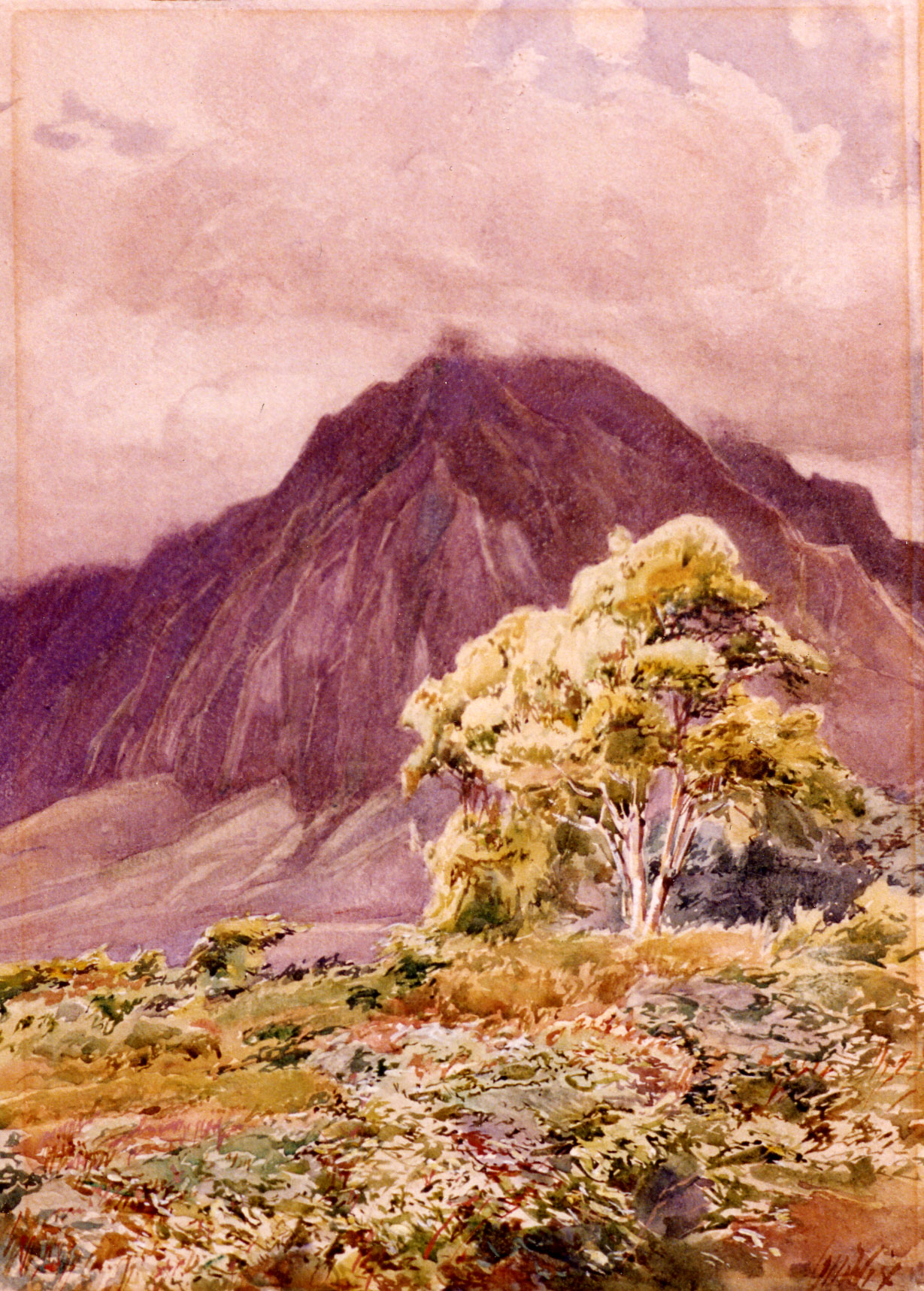
Kauai, watercolor painting on paper by Henry Otto Wix

Henry Otto Wix (1866 – March 13, 1922), also known as Otto Wix, was a German-born landscape and portrait painter who emigrated to the United States in the late 1890s. He studied in New York, but visited Hawaii in 1907 and 1908–1909. About 1910, he moved to San Francisco, but visited Hawaii again in 1912. He also made several sketching trips to Mexico. Wix's marriage ended in divorce, resulting in depression and alcoholism. He died by his own hand in Santa Barbara, California on March 13, 1922.

Wix is best known for his landscapes in watercolor. The Honolulu Museum of Art and the Smithsonian American Art Museum are among the public collections holding paintings by Wix.
