= Zuzanna Skiba =

German artist

Zuzanna Zita Skiba
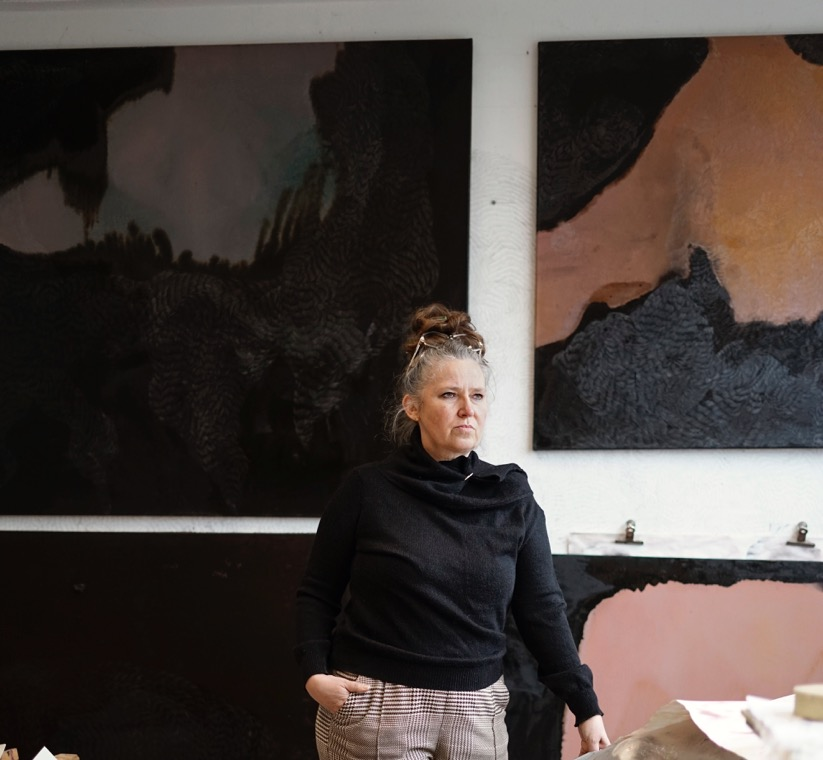
- Zuzanna Skiba in her studio (2021), portrayed by Maria Schöning
- Born: 1968 (age 57–58); Koszalin, Poland
- Website: www.zuzannaskiba.com

Zuzanna Zita Skiba (born 1968 in Koszalin, Poland) is a German artist. Her artistic media are primarily drawing and painting, but also photography, performance and video. She developed her own exhibition series as a curator under the theme Das verorte Verlangen_Kunst & Kartographie, as well as Hidden & Bad, Collier, tasty painting and Salon Philadelphia. Skiba is a member of the Deutscher Künstlerbund, Berufsverband Bildender Künstler*innen Berlin and the Verein der Berliner Künstlerinnen. She lives and works in Berlin.

== Life ==
Zuzanna Skiba was born in Koszalin in Poland in 1968 as the daughter of German Ukrainians. The family moved to Germany in 1977 and settled in Bielefeld.

In 1988 Zuzanna Skiba completed her training as a cartographer in the map department of the City of Bielefeld and at City Hall and State Survey for Aerial Photography in Bad Godesberg. The focus of her training was topographic and thematic cartography, as well as terrain cartography and hachure. There she met her mentor, the painter and cartographer Werner Drimecker (1928 - 2011). From 1990 to 1995 Zuzanna Skiba studied painting under Inge Dörries-Höher and free drawing under Karl-Heinz Meyer at the FH Design in Bielefeld. She received her diploma in painting from Inge Höher on the subject of colour flow as irritation, the abandoned perspective (Farbfluß als Irritation, die aufgegebene Perspektive). She then did post-graduate studies on painting at the Academie Minerva in Groningen (Netherlands) under Johan van Oord and Jaap Berghuis. 1997-1998 she was a guest student at the Berlin University of the Arts on philosophy under Robert Kudelka on Kant's Critique of Judgement, as well as a postgraduate student in on Art in Context (Kunst im Kontext) from 2013 to 2014.

== Work ==
In her artistic work Zuzanna Skiba deals with the theme of magnetic fields, which she visualises as subjective cartography in her paintings and drawings. Terrain hachure, a cartographic drawing key, is her central means of representation. In cartography, hachure is used to depict the topographical nature of a landscape. Short lines are placed next to each other, following alternating directions and with variable density and length, in order to visualise landscape elevations in the two-dimensional top view of a map.

Zuzanna Skiba conceptually transfers the terrain hachure to natural and emotional energies, which appear on canvas or paper in amorphous, seemingly flowing and formations. The dotted structures seem to obtain their shape through magnetic influence and to change fluidly. The origin of these magnetic fields are inner "landscapes" that are brought into the picture. Thus, the artistic process is a mental cartography that, in a state of continuous change, on the one hand feeds subjectively from the artist's memories and experiences, but on the other hand also refers to external contexts.

=== Work cycles ===
==== Drawn ====
Zuzanna Skiba's concept is particularly clear in the work cycle Drawn. In case of the pencil drawing, she works exclusively with the cartographic hachure of the terrain. Immersed in the process of her work, she places hachure line upon hachure line and creates a whole piece by piece without the lines touching. Through the flowing mobility of the surfaces, the magnetic fields develop a three-dimensional physicality that expands spatially into the depth of the picture. Skiba speaks here of painterly drawing.

==== Drawn on Painting ====
In the work cycle Drawn on Painting, Zuzanna Skiba places hachure with a light oil pencil on dark planes painted with oil paint, thus making the drawing float above the painting like a detached plane. She detaches her landscapes, which are primarily two-dimensional from above, and adds additional perspectives: from above, from below and from the middle. The result are multi-layered - both on canvas and thematically - views that depict the full spectrum of cartography.

==== Embedded ====
In the work cycle Embedded Zuzanna Skiba paints over drawings of magnetic fields with semi-transparent layers of paint. The results are organic forms in red, grey and brown hues, which embed the existing, hatched magnetic fields within themselves. Due to the multi-layered, glazing application of paint in gouache, acrylic varnish and originally also in food colour, these forms develop their dimensions.

==== Painted ====
Zuzanna Skiba's work cycle Painted is the implementation of her pictorial concept using a purely painterly technique. Primarily executed in oil on canvas, sometimes supplemented by other materials such as tar or gold pigment, these works appear like aerial views of imaginary islands and volcanoes, abstracted as energy fields. The artist's painting technique, which has always been impasto, emphasises the organic character of her paintings. The full crust of paint turns the pictures into landscapes themselves and refers back to the conceptual starting point of a cartographic art.
