= Grete Waldau =

German painter and mural artist

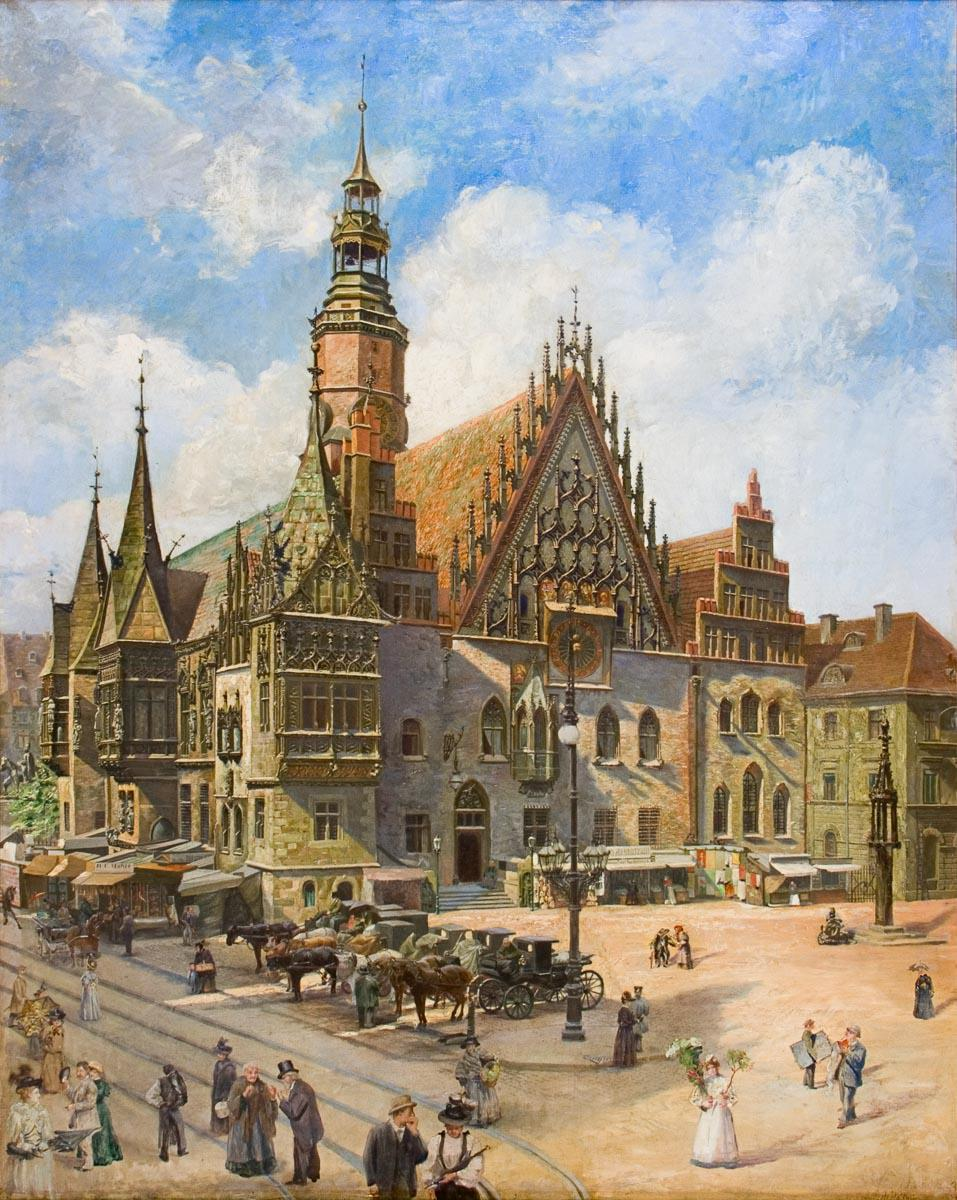
Breslauer Rathaus, 1900

Grete Waldau was a German painter and mural artist who specialized in architectural painting. Some of her works were owned by Carol I, the king of Romania, and Wilhelm II, the German emperor.

== Life and career ==
Waldau was born on 14 March 1868 in Breslau, Silesia, Kingdom of Prussia, now known as Wroclaw, Poland. She attended an art academy in Breslau, and later traveled to Nuremberg to study under an architectural painter. She studied under Berlin artists Karl Wilhelm Streckfuss and Carl Graeb. Around 1889, she made architectural pieces for the decoration of Geheimrat Heimann's villa dining room in Breslau.

A painting she made depicting Lorenz Church in Nuremberg was owned by the King of Romania, Carol I. She painted murals on the interior of the Oldenburg post office, for which she received a gold medal in art and science from the Grand Duke of Oldenburg.

After German emperor Wilhelm II took notice of her work, the German Empire commissioned two paintings from her for the 1900 Paris Exposition. According to American newspapers in 1905, this made her "the first woman in Germany to receive a commissions for works of art from the Government." The emperor later owned at least four of her paintings and awarded her the Order of Honor, making her the first female artist to receive one.

Four of her paintings were exhibited at the 1904 St. Louis World's Fair. Around 1904, she created and painted murals for the interior of the ship Kaiser Wilhelm II. Before 1905, she was commissioned by the city of Oldenburg to create a painting as a wedding gift for the German crown prince and princess.
