= Zingraff =

German artist

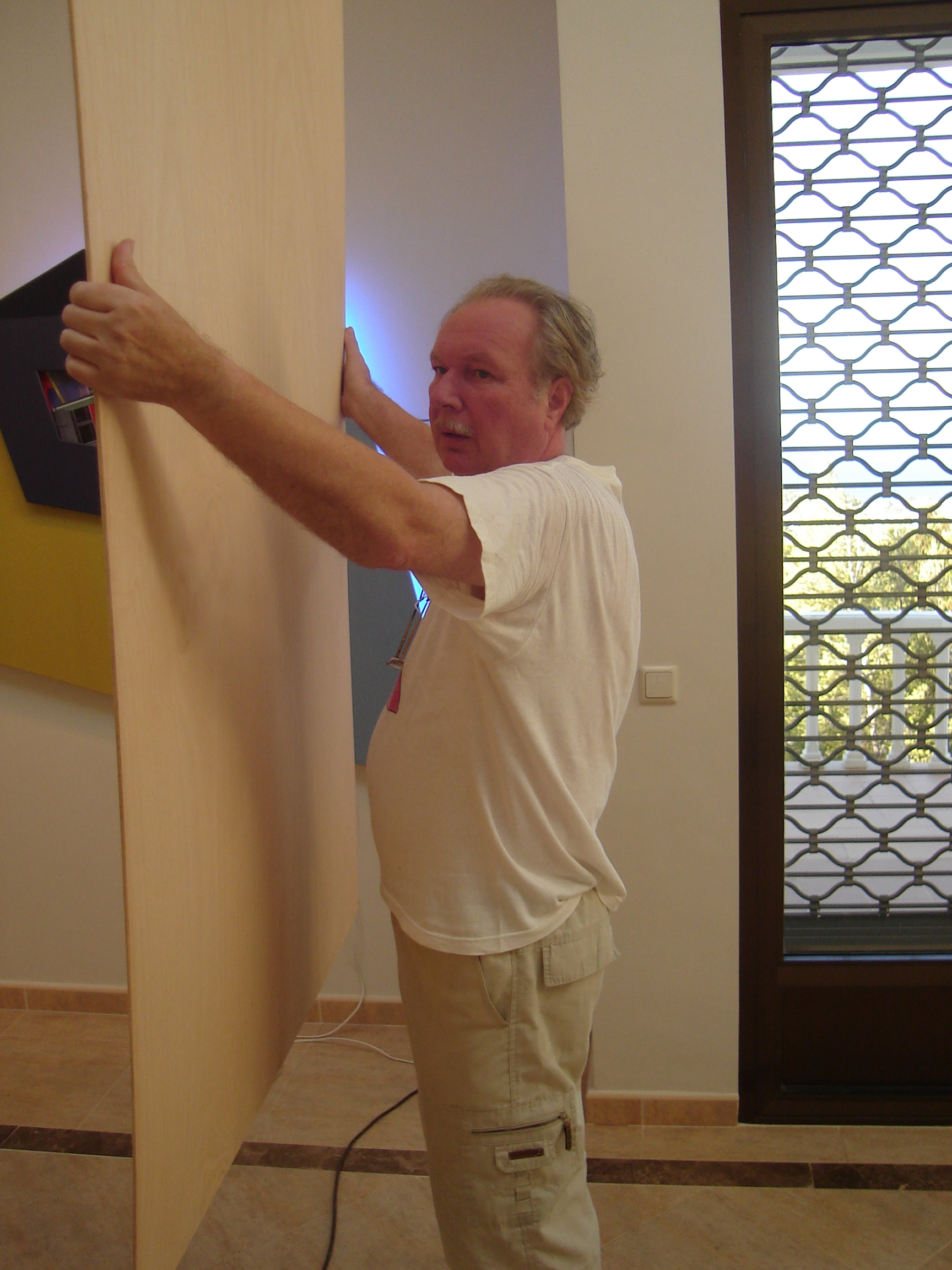

Hans Dieter Zingraff (born 1947 in Karlsruhe) is a German artist in constructivism. He was born in Karlsruhe, Germany in 1947 as the son of an electrical engineer. Zingraff showed an early interest in the arts, in particular in trompe-l'œil, the optical illusion technique.

== In Spain ==
In 1972 he moved to Dénia, Spain, creating a number of critically noticed works in the surrealist style. He continued to paint purely abstract including architectural still lives in mixed media collage. In 1984 he started experimenting on wood strip images, while conversely, seemingly glued pieces of photography were actually painted.

== The 1980s ==
In the years 1983 to 1985 Zingraff managed a crucial step in the current local art scene. As an absolute novice, in 1983 one of his pictures was selected by the jury of the 50th Salon de Otoño (Association of Spanish Painters and Sculptors) in Madrid. After a period of soft lines and shapes, he returned to the hard line.

== Zingraff's Constructivism ==
From 1996, Zingraff themed the removal of spatial continuity and visual ambiguity radically abstract. In 1999 he developed his personal style. He brought his compositions now effectively out of the area and out of the traditional format. Depth, volume and lighting are since there no longer painted illusions, but a tangible reality. Wall and space are included in the works, back-mounted lights give real light and shadow. Despite his many exhibitions Zingraff continuously creates new works. In recent years, his works were exposed in New York, Lima (Peru), Madrid, Berlin, artKarlsruhe, and Cairo.

== Awards and honors ==
1st Prize in the competition "Minicuadros, Elda (Alicante) in 1981 3rd Medal of the 51st Salon de Otoño (Association of Spanish Painters and Sculptors) in the Cultural Center of Madrid (Centro Cultural de la Villa de Madrid) in 1984 2nd Medal of the 52nd Salon de Otoño in 1985 "Galerias Preciado"-Price, 23 Exhibition of San Isidro, Madrid Medal of OMJET (Cairo) Artes Plasticas Convocatoria 2005 and 2006, Government of Alicante

== Works (selection) ==
Works in museums

- Foundation, Camilo José Cela, Iria Flavia, Padron. (A Coruña)
- Museum of Contemporary Art in Vilafamés
- Museum of Guinea Ecuatorial
- Museum of La Rioja, Logroño
- Museum of OMJET, Tunis
- Museum of Contemporary Art in Elx (Elche)
- Museum of Contemporary Graphic Art in Marbella
- Museum of Contemporary Art, Marbella
- Art Gallery of OMJET (Cairo)
- Exma. Diputación de Alicante, Alicante

Solo Exhibitions and International Art Fairs

- 1990: Quorum Gallery, Madrid; Gallery Sureste, Granada
- 1991: Gallery de Palau, Valencia (also 1998, 2003, 2006 and 2009)
- 1992: Gallery del Coleccionista, Madrid
- 1995: Gallery "Henry", Pau (France)
- 2001: Galeria Alahdros, Ibiza, Atlantica Gallery, A Coruña, Galicia
- 2003: Gallery Pilar Mulet, Madrid
- 2005: Government Alicante, Museo de Bellas Artes Gravina
- 2006: Castle d'Porto Mos, Portugal, Gallery Palais Munck, Karlsruhe, Town Hall of Calpe
- 2007: Egyptian Institute of Madrid, Gallery Carmen Carrión, Santander, Centro de Arte Atlantica, A Coruña
- 2008: Gezira Art Center, Cairo, Egypt; Center of Creativity, Alexandria, Egypt; Fiart, Valencia, Museum of the Government of Cáceres
- 2009: Santa Barbara Castle, Alicante; Art Karlsruhe, One man show

Joint exhibitions and competitions

- 1990: 1st Biennale of Almeria, Almería.
- 1991: Cultural Center "Conde Duque," Homage to the town hall of Madrid Camilo José Cela
- 1992: X. Bienal Internacional del Deporte en las Bellas Artes, Barcelona
- 1998: XVII Certamen de Pintura, "Eusebio Sempere," Art al `Hotel, Valencia, Galerie Palais Munck, Karlsruhe.
- 2001: Casa Vieira Guimaraes, Tomar, Cidade Templaria, Portugal
- 2002: MAI, Salamanca, European Capital of Culture
- 2003: Viaje de Papel (Para Cuba-dos), Universitat Politecnica de Valencia, Museum of Art & Culture de Lescar, Lescar, France
- 2004: Museum Cantanhede Exposición Quorum
- 2005: Grupo MAI, Galerie des Arenes, Bayonne, France, Painter of the Mediterranean, MUBAG, Alicante Provincial Government, National Museum, Lima, Peru, Lladro Museum, New York, 57th Street, Galerie & Edition René Steiner, Erlach, Switzerland * 2008: Colors and shapes, museum la Rioja, Logroño
- 2009: Gallery "La Caja China", Seville

== Literature ==
- Peter, Claudia (2005). Hans Dieter Zingraff. Center Cultural d'Alcoi. ISBN 978-84-95614-58-2.
- Schrade, Ewald Karl; Rigo Fay; Thomas Lindemann, eds. (2009). KARLSRUHE-one artist. Karlsruhe.
- Government of Extremadura, ed. (2008). Hans Dieter Zingraff - Contenido Geometrico. Tecnigraf, Cáceres. ISBN 978-84-9852-088-0.
- Alicante Provincial Government, ed. (2005). Hans Dieter Zingraff. Quinto Impresión. ISBN 84-96206-63-7.
- Alicante Provincial Government, ed. (2004). 15 artist of the Mediterranean. Diputación de Alicante. ISBN 84-96206-44-0.
- Fernández, Pastor Silvia (2002). Quién y por qué. Arte y Patrimonio. ISBN 84-607-3859-0.
- Adrián Espí Valdés; Dionisio Gázquez (2001). Alicante Provincial Government (ed.). Alicante province Painters 1900-2000. Graficas slides. ISBN 9788487032769.
- Alicantino Instituto de Cultura Juan Gil-Albert, ed. (2003). Art of the 20th Century in Alicante. Graficas Estilo. ISBN 84-7784-429-1.
