= Karl Josef Weinmair =

German artist

Moritatensänger an der Drehorgel, 1931

Karl Josef Weinmair (1906–October 1944), also known as Karl Weinmair, was an early twentieth century German artist. His lithographs during the period of the Weimar Republic express the resignation and despair of the poverty and unemployment of the time. Later cartoon style pen and ink work drawn secretly during the Nazi regime caricatures the Nazis. Weinmair was killed at the beginning of October 1944 by an airplane bombing attack.
