= Paul Preuning =

German artist

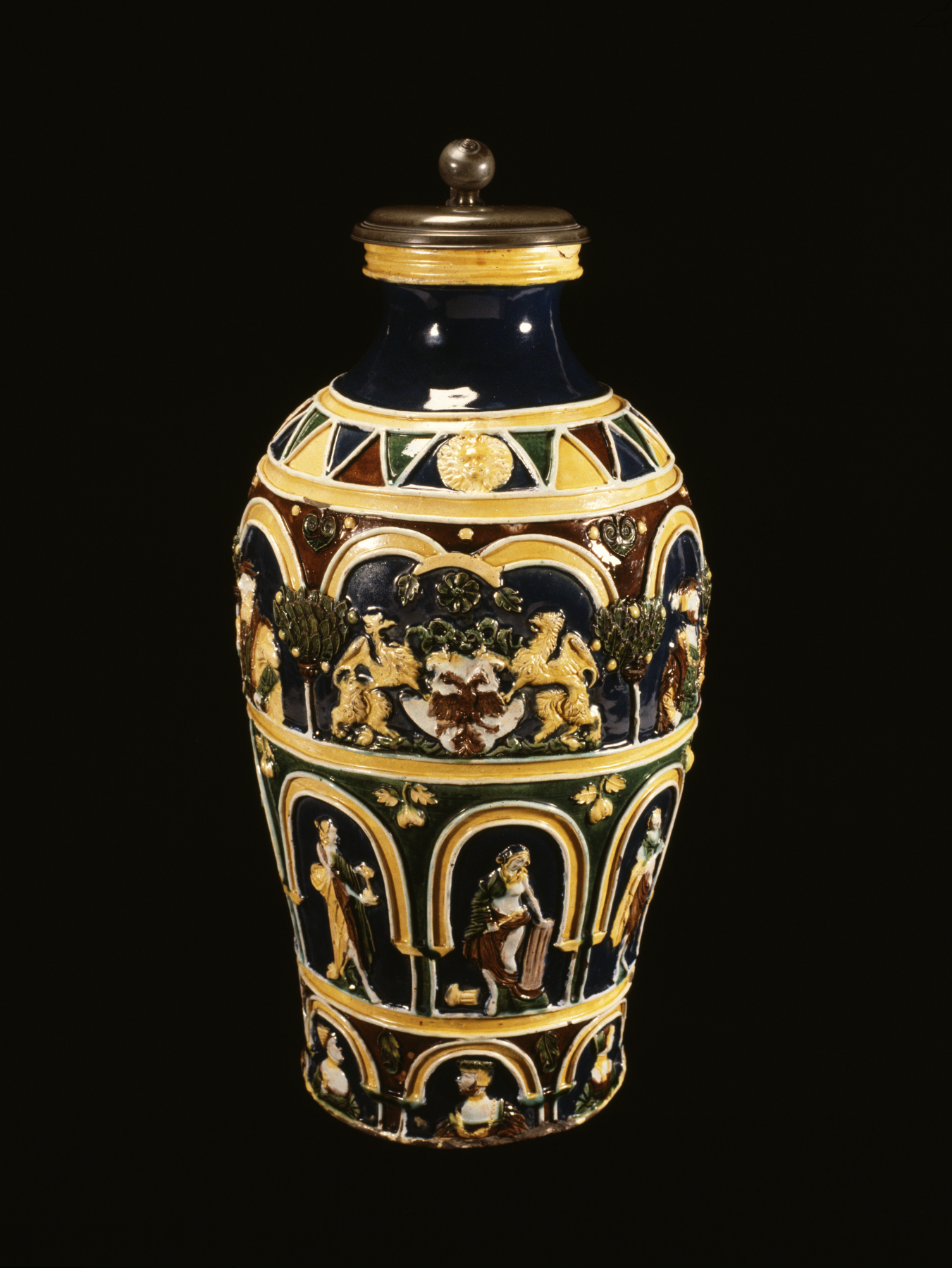
Large Jug produced by the workshop of Paul Preuning, Walters Art Museum, 1550-1560

Paul Preuning (fl. 1540–1550) was a German artist based in Nuremberg. The Preuning family of potters based in Nuremberg is recorded as making high class pottery at their workshop. He is best known for his Hafner ware: jugs and other vessels of a kind made by stove makers. Preuning primarily decorated his pottery using the cloisonné technique, utilizing colored glazes kept apart by threads of clay.
