= Caroline Auguste Fischer =

German writer and feminist

Caroline Auguste Fischer (born 9 August 1764 in Braunschweig – died 26 May 1842 in Frankfurt) was a German writer and women's rights activist. She began to write after her divorce from her first husband, who won custody of their son Rudolf. Her debut novel Gustav's Aberrations was published anonymously. This was followed by an epistolary novel, The Honeymonths, and later The Protege, and Margaret. She also wrote stories and newspaper articles. Fischer later got into financial difficulty and, in 1820, became the principal of a reform school in Heidelberg and a library book dealer in Frankfurt. In her later years, she suffered from depression and moved to Frankfurt to live with Albert, her son from her second marriage. Fischer died about 10 years later in 1842.

== Life ==
Caroline Auguste Venturini was born in Braunschweig on 9 August 1764. She was the daughter of Karl Venturini (1735–1801) a chamber musician at the ducal court in Braunschweig and Charlotty (née Köchy). On her father's side, Venturini's family was probably of Italian origin. Her brother Karl Heinrich Georg Venturini was a famous early-19th-century theologist and writer.

She married Pastor Cristoph Johann Rudolph Christiani(1761–1841) sometime on or before 1791. He was the German high priest in Copenhagen and ran a boys' school there, at which Caroline's brother Karl taught for several years. The couple had a son, the jurist and politician Rudolf Christiani(1797–1858) and a daughter who died in 1795, aged 3. During her time in Copenhagen, she rubbed shoulders with Danish and German artists. Among others, she was friendly with the writer Jens Immanuel Baggesen. In 1801, the couple divorced. Caroline she was deemed the guilty party in the divorce and therefore their son was left in his father's custody.

Caroline went to Dresden and began to write and soon became famous. She published her first novels as early as 1801. She lived with businessman and writer, and later professor in Würzburg, Christian August Fischer. The couple had a son, Albert, in 1803. They lived separately, but ended up marrying in 1808. They divorced after just 7 months of marriage in 1809. Fischer admitted to having been put off by her advanced age and overwhelmed by her fame. Fischer paid her alimony but Caroline got into financial difficulty. Fischer was then dismissed from the university and stopped paying alimony payments, meaning that Caroline had less and less time to dedicate to her writing.

Until 1820, she was still writing stories and newspaper articles. But after 1820, she made her living as the principal of a reform school in Heidelberg and as a library book dealer in Frankfurt. In her later years, she suffered from depression and was admitted to a care home for several weeks in 1832. She subsequently moved to Frankfurt to live with her son, Albert. After Albert's death two years later, little is known about her.

Completely impoverished, she died in the Frankfurt Hospice of the Holy Spirit in 1842.

== Work ==
After her divorce, Caroline Auguste Christiani began to write. In her work, which was probably also influenced by her own life, she depicted the tension between the genders, juxtaposing traditional female role models with new, alternative ways for women to live their lives, which mostly completely contradicted the idealistic view of the woman in the early 19th century. In line with her call for equality, which only existed for men in the French Revolution, she called for women's right to an independent way of life, which could also absolutely still be traditional marriage.

=== Gustav's Aberrations ===
Her debut novel Gustav's Aberrations was published anonymously. She narrated the story from the perspective of the male protagonist, detailing his feelings towards different women in his life. He repeatedly idealises them and is then repulsed when he discovers a real, independent person instead of his ideal. Gustav ashamedly recognises the societal gap between the genders. Chastened and suffering from a sexually transmitted disease he returns to his first true love. However, he then wants to get divorced because the ideal of their marriage cannot be fulfilled: they do not have any children and, as a consequence, he believes he will make his wife unhappy. Like the previous wives, the wife and her wishes are not part of his imagination. The book ends with Gustav's premature death and his widow's second marriage, which produces many children.

=== Honeymonths ===
Her epistolary novel The Honeymonths, which was written not long after her divorce, is a response to Wilhelmine Karoline von Wobeser's publication Elisa, or the wife as she should be, which was a bestseller at its time, and in which von Wobeser creates the ideal image of the selfless woman. In 1800, Caroline Auguste's partner Fischer had written an appendix for the fifth edition in which he outlined man's right to supremacy and demanded subservience from women. Caroline Auguste Christiani's The Honeymonths was released anonymously. The female protagonist, the virtuous and gentle Julie, is, like in Elisa, trapped in an unhappy marriage of convenience and actually willingly sacrifices herself for her selfish husband, who is described as unlikeable, instead of choosing to love another man. In contrast, her friend Wilhelmine repudiates the contemporary image of women, refuses an arranged marriage and instead demands a temporary marriage and women's right to keep their children after a divorce. She urges Julie to take a stand and warns her not to become like Elisa. Julie ends up remaining a widow, whereas Wilhelmine finds her love.

=== Protégé ===
In The Protégé, Fischer addresses the question of how women deal with power and how men deal with powerful women. The protagonist, the ruler Iwanova, resembles Catherine the Great. She is pitted against young Maria, the embodiment of the ideal woman in Rousseau's sense. Both women are connected to Prince Alexander from whose perspective the story unfolds. The prince rejects the ruler's love for two reasons: at first, he deems his career more important and later on he recognises the selfless love of Maria. Iwanova allows their marriage, but she murders the couple during their wedding night. Nevertheless, Iwanova is depicted positively, while Alexander is the one who does not get along with a strong woman.

=== Margaret ===
In the novel Margaret, two women opt against marriage. Rosamunde, who is a dancer, would prefer to dedicate her time for art and Margaret decides against the love of a prince and the upward mobility that would have come with the relationship. Instead, she dedicates herself to social work.

=== William ===
In her short story William the Negro, published in 1817, the protagonist is a black man. William, a freed slave living under the protection of Sir Robert, a rich Englishman, falls in love with Molly who is the daughter of an impoverished businessman. However, their love story fails, which has less to do with the prejudices from Molly's relatives than with Robert who actually wants to serve his friend as messenger of love but himself falls in love with Molly. William leaves Molly and becomes one of the leaders of the Haitian Revolution, turning the French colony Saint-Domingue into Haiti, the first state governed by black people. Although Fischer does not completely discard contemporary racism, she does clearly speak out against slavery and argues in favour of human rights for all people.

=== Other ===
Caroline Fischer published a few narratives in magazines between 1816 and 1820, but then stopped. Carl Wilhelm Otto August von Schindel wrote in his 1825 book German Female Writers of the 19th Century: "Rather than those of other people, she has been gathering her own thoughts about women for eighteen years now in order to put them together in a book. Considering her circumstances she has not been able to determine when and if the book will be released." It was never published.

== Publications ==
- Gustavs Verirrungen. Novel, 1801
- Vierzehn Tage in Paris. Fairy Tale, 1801
- Mährchen. In: Journal der Romane. St. 10. Berlin, 1802 (digital copy and full text in the German text archive)
- Krauskopf und Goldlöckchen. Fairy Tale, 1802
- Selim und Zoraïde. Fairy Tale, 1802
- Paridamia oder die Krebsscheeren. Fairy Tale, 1802
- Die Honigmonathe. Two Volumes. 1802 and 1804
- Der Günstling. 1809
- Margarethe. Novel, 1812
- Kleine Erzählungen und romantische Skizzen. 1819 (Content: Riekchen, William der Neger, Mathilde, Saphir and Marioh and Justin)

== Literature ==
- Lexikon deutschsprachiger Schriftstellerinnen 1800–1945. Munich: dtv, 1986. (S. 85 f.) – Statement says: „† 1834 in Frankfurt am Main“.
- Manfred R. W. Garzmann, Wolf-Dieter Schuegraf, Norman-Mathias Pingel: Braunschweiger Stadtlexikon. Ergänzungsband. Meyer, Brunswick 1996, ISBN 3-926701-30-7.
- Horst-Rüdiger Jarck, Günter Scheel (Hrsg.): Braunschweigisches Biographisches Lexikon. 19. und 20. Jahrhundert. Hahn, Hanover 1996, ISBN 3-7752-5838-8.
- Clementine Kügler: Caroline Auguste Fischer (1764–1842). Eine Werkbiographie. Diss. FU Berlin 1989.
- Elke Spitzer: Emanzipationsansprüche zwischen der Querelle des Femmes und der modernen Frauenbewegung: der Wandel des Gleichheitsbegriffs am Ausgang des 18. Jahrhunderts. Diss., Kassel Univ. Press, 2002, S. 123–163, Full text (PDF; 882 kB).
- Christine Touaillon: Der deutsche Frauenroman des 18. Jahrhunderts. Braumüller, Vienna and Leipzig 1919, S. 578–629 – Internet Archive.
