= Walter Schönenbröcher =

German photographer and filmmaker (born 1964)

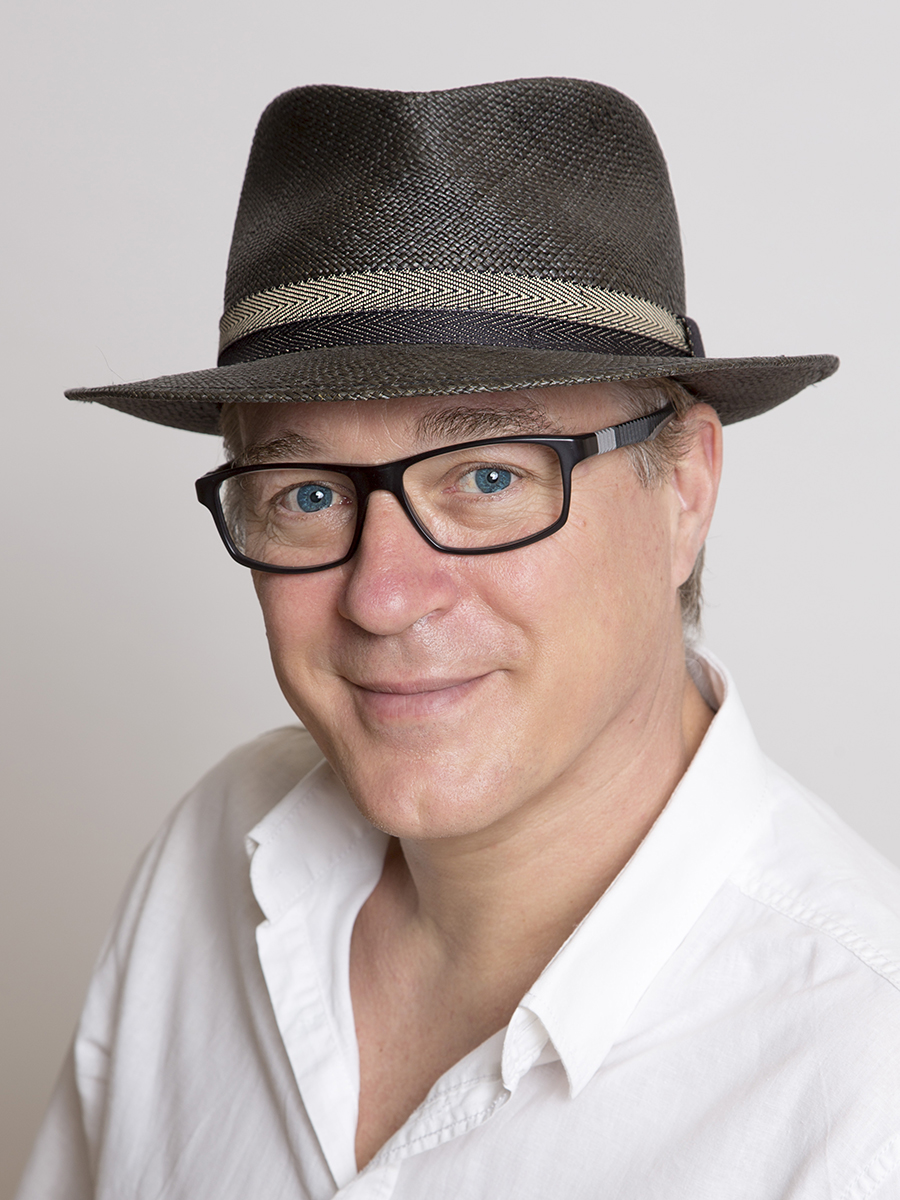
- by Anke Deckmann 2016
- Born: 1964 (age 61–62); Bergisch Gladbach, Germany
- Occupations: Photographer, Photoartist
- Spouse: Kathrin Clara Jantke (m. 2016)

Walter Schönenbröcher (born 1964) is a German photographer and filmmaker.

== Life and work ==
Walter Schönenbröcher was born in 1964 in Bergisch Gladbach and grew up in Cologne. From 1984 to 1990 he studied mathematics and economic sciences at RWTH Aachen and Technische Universität Berlin, which he stopped when he founded his first IT company. From 1988 to 2014 he was the managing partner of an internet group with several companies. In 2010 Walter Schönenbröcher took up photography. He moved from early nature and architectural photography to portrait photography, taking on jobs for public figures from film, music, politics, sports and business.

From 2010 to 2016 Walter Schönenbröcher grew his portfolio at Vogue Italia to over 230 pictures and his work was honored with a total of ten "BEST OF" titles.

In early 2011, in addition to other art projects, he started the historical documentation series HANDwerk, which documents rare and endangered trades. In 2016 the state of Brandenburg supported this photo spread with a national traveling exhibition in connection with the Brandenburg Year of Culture. The works will be displayed next in the Brandenburg state parliament as well as in several unique Brandenburg museums. The project now includes over 45 trades and more than 600 works.

In September 2016, he married German composer and singer Kathrin Clara Jantke.

In 2017, he began producing virtual reality film series and short films using stereoscopic 360° film technology. Among them is also the cinematic continuation of his contemporary historical documentary HANDwerk with which he received the insta360 Award in 2018 and 2019 nominations at international film festivals (Nashville Film Festival 2019, FIVARS 2019, nextreality.contest 2019, London Lift-Off Film Festival 2019).

Since 2018, Schönenbröcher has also been producing a virtual reality film series "Artists up close", in which he portrays art prize winners on film.

== Exhibitions (international) ==
- 2018: Art Nou Milenni, Barcelona (Spain): FotoExpo (Gruppenausstellung)
- 2017: Balkan Photo Festival, Sarajevo (Bosnia and Herzegovina):Finalist of the Balkan Photo Awards(Group exhibition)
- 2017: ST.ART, Strasbourg (France)
- 2017: ARTEHOS, Barcelona (Spain)
- 2015: New York Center for Photographic Art, New York (USA):Portraits(Group exhibition)
- 2014: Photography Now, London (Great Britain):Intagliotypy(Group exhibition)
- 2013: Art Gallery SATURA, Genoa (Italy):Architecture(Solo exhibition)
- 2012: Culture-Festival PENSA, Prodenone (Italy):Award Winners(Group exhibition)

== Exhibitions (Germany) ==
- 2018: City gallery "KUNSTGESCHOSS", Werder (Germany): Afterwards (Dual exhibition)
- 2017: Ironworks Museum, Peitz (Germany):Craftsmanship(Special exhibition)
- 2017: City Museum Pritzwalk, Pritzwalk (Germany):Craftsmanship(Special exhibition)
- 2017: Crafts fair, Cottbus (Germany):Craftsmanship(Solo exhibition)
- 2016: Parliament of Brandenburg, Potsdam (Germany): Craftsmanship (Solo exhibition)
- 2016: Museum at Frey Haus, Brandenburg a.d.H. (Germany): Craftsmanship (Solo exhibition)
- 2016: Museum of Schloss Doberlug (Germany): Craftsmanship (Solo exhibition)
- 2016: Old Gymnasium Neuruppin (Germany): Craftsmanship (Solo exhibition)
- 2016: Technische Hochschule Wildau (Germany): Craftsmanship (Solo exhibition)
- 2016: Kloster Neuzelle (Germany): Craftsmanship (Solo exhibition)
- 2016: Kleist-Theater Frankfurt (Oder) (Germany): Craftsmanship (Solo exhibition)
- 2016: Rathaus Schwedt/Oder (Germany): Craftsmanship (Solo exhibition)
- 2016: Rathaus Lübbenau/Spreewald (Germany): Craftsmanship (Solo exhibition)
- 2016: Chamber of Crafts Cottbus (Germany): Craftsmanship (Solo exhibition)
- 2016: Bank of Elbe-Elster, Finsterwalde (Germany):einBLICK.(Solo exhibition)
- 2015: Chamber of Crafts Cottbus (Germany): Craftsmanship (Solo exhibition)
- 2015: Neuberinhaus, Reichenbach at Vogtland (Germany):einBLICK.(Solo exhibition)
- 2014: Castle Vetschau (Germany):einBLICK.(Solo exhibition)
- 2011: Müritzeum Museum, Waren (Germany):Nature(Solo exhibition)
- 2011: Rathaus Malchow (Germany):einBLICK.(Solo exhibition)

== Publications ==
- Campus Galli, Cottbus 2016, 1st Edition, ISBN 978-3-9817962-1-6.
- CRAFTSMANSHIP, Cottbus 2016, 1st edition, ISBN 978-3-9817962-0-9.
- Klavierbau, Calvendo publishing house, Unterhaching 2016, 1st edition, ISBN 978-3-665-48679-2.
- Lausitzimpressionen, Calvendo publishing house, Unterhaching 2016, 1st edition, ISBN 978-3-665-49075-1.
- Faces of London, Calvendo publishing house, Unterhaching 2013, 3rd edition, ISBN 978-3-664-24416-4.
- Faces of London, Calvendo publishing house, Unterhaching 2013, 3rd edition, ISBN 978-3-664-24410-2.
- Rügen Art, Calvendo publishing house, Unterhaching 2013, 3rd edition, ISBN 978-3-664-35957-8.
- POP11 quer, Calvendo publishing house, Unterhaching 2012, 1st edition, ISBN 978-3-660-05947-2.
- POP11 high, Calvendo publishing house, Unterhaching 2012, 1st edition, ISBN 978-3-660-04966-4.
- Stilles Berlin, Calvendo publishing house, Unterhaching 2012, 3rd edition, ISBN 978-3-660-63201-9.
- POP2016 quer, Calvendo publishing house, Unterhaching 2012, 4th edition, ISBN 978-3-664-17023-4.
- POP2016 high, Calvendo publishing house, Unterhaching 2012, 4th edition, ISBN 978-3-664-17148-4.
- Kunstkalender quer, Calvendo publishing house, Unterhaching 2012, 4th edition, ISBN 978-3-664-17180-4.
- Art Calendar High, Calvendo publishing house, Unterhaching 2012, 4th edition, ISBN 978-3-664-17087-6.

== Art projects ==
- 2016:70 years of LR on the occasion of the jubilee of the Lausitzer Rundschau
- 2016:Kunst am BauMedia house in Cottbus
- 2015:The art of inclusionfor the life support association

== Awards ==
=== Photography ===
- 2016: Bosnia Herzegovina -Balkan Photo Festival
- 2015: Argentina -Federación Argentina de Fotografìa
- 2015: USA -New York Center for Photographic Art
- 2014: France -IIIème Salon Photographique International
- 2014: Bosnia Herzegovina -Univerzitetski Photo Club Banjaluka
- 2014: Spain -Agrupació Fotografica Setabense d'Aficionats Xàtiva
- 2014: India -JCM Circuit
- 2013: Germany -1. Bavarian International Circuit
- 2013: Germany -1. Bavarian International Circuit
- 2013: Argentina -2. Sálon International de Fotografía

=== Movies ===
- 2021: Germany– Continental Film Festival (Nomination)
- 2021: Germany – VRHAM! (Official Selection)
- 2021: India – Sun of the East Award (Winner)
- 2018: China – insta360 Award (Winner)
- 2019: USA – Nashville Film Festival 2019 (Nomination)
- 2019: Canada – FIVARS 2019 (Nomination)
- 2019: Germany – nextreality.contest 2019 (Nomination)
- 2019: United Kingdom – Lift-Off Film Festival London 2019 (Nomination)
- 2020: Niederlande – Ambacht in Beeld Film Festival Amsterdam 2020 (Official Selection)
- 2020: Germany – Lift-Off Film Festival Berlin 2020 (Official Selection)
- 2020: USA – Los Angeles Film Award 2020 (Winner Best Virtual Reality)
- 2020: India – Tagore International Film Festival 2020 (Winner Best VR/AR and 360° Film)
- 2020: Italy – Varese International Film Festival 2020 (Winner Best VR Project)
- 2020: Spain – Barcelona Planet Film Festival 2020 (Winner Best Virtual Reality/360°)>
- 2020: Buthan – Druk International Film Festival 2020 (Winner Best Virtual Reality Project°)
- 2020: Calcutta – L’Age d’Or International Arthouse Film Festival 2020 (Winner Best VR/AR and 360° Film)
- 2020: USA – New York Cinematography AWARDS (NYCA)(Semi Finalist Best VR/AR and 360° Film)
- 2020: Austria– Vienna Science Film Festival (Finalist Best VR/AR and 360° Film)
- 2020: India – Sand Dance International Film Festival 2020 (Sieger Best VR Project)
- 2020: Australia – SmartFone Flick Fest 2020 (Sieger SF360)
- 2020: USA – The Chico Independent Film Festival (Finalist Best VR/AR and 360° Film)
- 2020: USA – Gold Movie Awards (Semi-Finalist Best Series)
- 2021: Germany – VRHAM! (Official Selection)
- 2021: Germany – Continental Film Festival (Finalist Virtual Reality)
