= Louise Pagenkopf =

German painter (1856–1922)

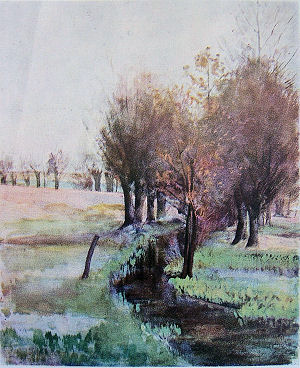
- April in Watercolor by Louise Pagenkopf
- Born: Louise Elisabeth Wilhelmine Pagenkopf; 3 March 1856; Fürstenberg/Havel, Kingdom of Prussia
- Died: 30 March 1922 (aged 66); Berlin, Germany
- Occupation: Painter

Louise Pagenkopf (née Louise Elisabeth Wilhelmine Pagenkopf; 3 March 1856 – 30 March 1922) was a German female landscape and flower painter. She is most known for her watercolor paintings, which have been featured and exhibited in several national and international art expeditions.

== Life ==
Louise Pagenkopf was born on 3 March 1856 in Fürstenberg/Havel, Kingdom of Prussia. She lived in Berlin from 1871, there she studied at The Royal School of Art in Berlin. She was a student of R. Warthemüller, Walter Leistikow and Walter Moras. From 1894 to 1899 she traveled to southern Germany, Paris (1895/96) and French-speaking Switzerland. She was a member of the artists' association in Berlin.

== Works ==
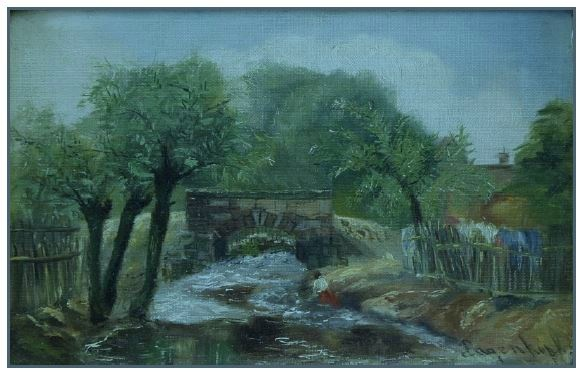
Laundress in front a stone bridge by Louise Pagenkopf

Pagenkopf's landscape watercolors were featured in contemporary reviews for the lightness of their style. The watercolor April, published in color print in the Mecklenburgische Monatshefte in 1927, is described as follows: As a tender landscape atmosphere from the first days of April ... the whole lightness of the original wafts towards us.

== Literature ==
- Grete Grewolls: Who was who in Mecklenburg-Western Pomerania. Edition Temmen, Bremen 1995.
- General lexicon of visual artists from antiquity to the present. Volume 26. Engelmann, Leipzig 1932.
- Spiritual Germany at the end of the 19th century . Volume 1. Röder, Leipzig 1898.
