= Van Ray =

German artist

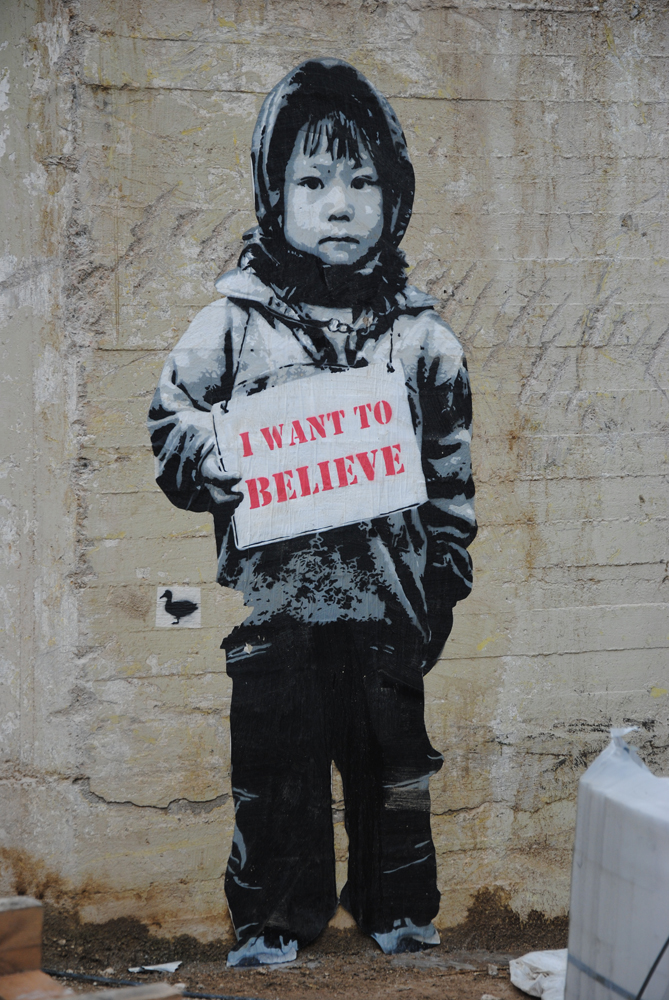
- "I want to believe" – paste-up by Van Ray
- Born: 1984 (age 41–42); Düsseldorf, North Rhine-Westphalia, Germany
- Movement: Street art

Van Ray (born 1984 in Düsseldorf) is a German artist. His art, mostly characterized as street art or urban art, makes use of various stencil techniques on vintage materials. Van Ray works from Düsseldorf, and is considered to be one of the most successful German urban art artists.

== Career ==
Van Ray's career began with public graffiti at the end of the 90s when he started using his art to communicate with the general public and to demonstrate social criticism. His works were based on various techniques (including stencils, stickers, paste-ups, and sculptures) and meant to express his view of Western society.

After moving to Cologne in 2007, Van Ray became the founder of the artist collaboration 'fancyroom' which concentrated on textile designs by combining elements of graffiti and graphic design. The results were used for own textile collections and by several fashion brands. The collaboration dissolved in 2010.

At this time the public art of Van Ray was attracting the attention of several gallery owners, offering him to present his street art in their exhibitions. Consequently, the artist finally agreed to a first gallery exhibition in the winter of 2010, presenting his "streets on wood"-series in the 30Works Gallery, Cologne. Due to his public work, several solo as well as group exhibitions, live shows, art festival appearances, and panel discussions, Van Ray has since then become one of the most famous German street artists.

In the course of the 25th anniversary of the fall of the Berlin Wall, he was invited by the Institut Pierre Werner to perform his art publicly during a live performance in Luxembourg.

== Techniques and themes ==
Van Ray's work is characterized by its detailed stencils on mostly rusty vintage materials such as iron sheets, vending machines and enamel signs or wooden slats. The works nowadays reflect a fusion of street art and pop art, retaining the basic elements of his distinctive artistic style without losing sight of his intended social criticism. On the relationship between art and protest, Van Ray commented:

"Rebellion does not derive from the use of a certain technique, but rather from the color of your tie."

His works are all signed with the "duck signature symbol".

== Selected exhibitions and fairs ==
- 2021 - Life is a fucking rainbow, (so), Venet-Haus Gallery, Ulm.
- 2021 - AFA Hamburg, (fa), Galerie Hegemann @ AFA Hamburg, Hamburg.
- 2021 - One Art Taipei, (fa), Gin Huang Gallery @ One Art Taipei, Taipei.
- 2021 - AFA NL, (fa), Venet-Haus Gallery @ AFA Netherlands, Amsterdam.
- 2021 - KIAF, (fa), Pigment Gallery @ Korean Int. Art Fair, Seoul.
- 2021 - Mixed, (gr), Christian Marx Gallery, Düsseldorf.
- 2021 - Fair for Art Vienna, (fa), Neue Kunst Gallery @ Kunstmesse Wien, Vienna.
- 2021 - Van Ray, (so), Art Gallery Wiesbaden, Wiesbaden.
- 2021 - Whaaaats Art Fair, (fa), Gin Huang Gallery @ Int. Art Fair, Taipei.
- 2021 - The Heist, (gr), Cafmeyer Gallery, Knokke.
- 2021 - Love on, (so), Neue Kunst Gallery, Karlsruhe.
- 2020 - Van Ray, (so), Gin Huang Gallery, Taipei.
- 2020 - Contemporary Istanbul (VR), (fa), Pigment Gallery @ Virtual CI, Istanbul.
- 2020 - X-Change, (gr.), Venet-Haus Gallery und Galerie Hegemann, Ulm/Munich.
- 2020 - Sympathy (feat. Patrizia Casagranda), (so), Neue Kunst Gallery, Karlsruhe.
- 2020 - Art Busan, (fa), Pigment Gallery @ Art Busan Korea, Busan.
- 2020 - Fair for Art Vienna, (fa), Neue Kunst Gallery @ Kunstmesse Wien, Vienna.
- 2020 - Popeye No3, (gr), Gallery Wolfsen, Aalborg.
- 2020 – Queens & Vandals (feat. Patrizia Casagranda), (gr), Art Gallery Wiesbaden, Wiesbaden.
- 2020 – Art Bodensee, (fa), Neue Kunst Gallery @ Art Bodensee, Dornbirn.
- 2020 – Wikam, (fa), Neue Kunst Gallery @ Wikam, Vienna.
- 2020 – Art Karlsruhe, (fa), Neue Kunst Gallery @ Art Karlsruhe, Karlsruhe.
- 2020 – London Art Fair, (fa), Venet-Haus Gallery @ London Art Fair, London.
- 2019 – Dare, (so), 30Works Gallery, Cologne.
- 2019 – AAF, (fa), Venet-Haus Gallery @ AAF, Hamburg.
- 2019 - Art Bodensee, (fa), Neue Kunst Gallery @ Art Bodensee, Dornbirn.
- 2019 - Popeye No 2, (gr), Galerie Wolfsen, Aalborg.
- 2019 - Metronome Festival, (li), Live Performance @ Metronome Festival, Prague.
- 2019 - Art Karlsruhe, (fa), Neue Kunst Gallery @ Art Karlsruhe, Karlsruhe.
- 2019 - Urban Works, (gr), Galerie Hegemann, Munich.
- 2019 - London Art Fair, (fa), Venet-Haus Gallery @ London Art Fair, London.
- 2018 - Never Let Idiots Ruin Your Day, (so), 30Works Gallery, Cologne.
- 2018 - 5 Years, (so), Venet-Haus Galerie, Ulm.
- 2018 - Fair for Art Vienna, (fa), Neue Kunst Gallery @ Kunstmesse Wien, Vienna.
- 2018 - Art Bodensee, (fa), Neue Kunst Gallery @ Art Bodensee, Dornbirn.
- 2018 - Art Karlsruhe, (fa), Neue Kunst Gallery @ Art Karlsruhe, Karlsruhe.
- 2018 - Rusted Reflections, (so), Neue Kunst Gallery, Karlsruhe.
- 2018 - London Art Fair, (fa), Venet-Haus Gallery @ London Art Fair, London.
- 2017 - One Dollar Bill, (so), 30Works Gallery, Cologne.
- 2017 - Sympathy for the Rebel, (so), Museum of Bergkamen.
- 2017 - Oxidated Optimism, (so), Ahoy Gallery, Palma.
- 2017 - Art Bodensee, (fa), Neue Kunst Gallery @ Art Bodensee, Dornbirn.
- 2017 - Fuck Boring, (so), Venet-Haus Gallery, Ulm.
- 2017 - Wikam, (fa), Neue Kunst Gallery @ Wikam, Vienna.
- 2017 - Art Karlsruhe, (fa), Neue Kunst Gallery @ Art Karlsruhe, Karlsruhe.
- 2017 - London Art Fair, (fa), Venet-Haus Gallery @ London Art Fair, London.
- 2016 - Diamonds & Rust, (so), 30Works Gallery, Cologne.
- 2016 - Art.Fair, (fa), 30Works Gallery @ Art.Fair, Cologne.
- 2016 - Wikam, (fa), Neue Kunst Gallery @ Wikam, Vienna.
- 2016 - Not Limits, (gr), Galerie Hegemann, Munich.
- 2016 - The Rust of Rebellion, (so), 30works Gallery, Cologne.
- 2016 - Limits are made to be broken, (so), Neue Kunst Gallery, Karlsruhe.
- 2016 - Art Karlsruhe, (fa), Neue Kunst Gallery @ Art Karlsruhe, Karlsruhe.
- 2015 - GrossArtig, (gr), Galerie Hegemann, Munich.
- 2015 - Art.Fair, (fa), 30Works Gallery @ Art.Fair, Cologne.
- 2015 – What if it's all a lie?, (so), 30Works Gallery, Cologne.
- 2015 – Stroke Art Fair, (fa), 30Works Gallery @ Stroke Art Fair, Munich.
- 2015 – Urban Beauty, (gr), Urban Art Gallery, Stuttgart.
- 2015 – Stealing graffiti is a crime, (gr), Galerie Kellermann, Düsseldorf.
- 2014 – Urban Art Festival, (gr), KuFa, Luxembourg.
- 2014 – Fuck You, (so), 30Works Gallery, Cologne.
- 2014 – Urban Art, (gr), Gallery Hegemann, Munich.
- 2014 – Street Art, (gr), Gallery am Dom, Kulturamt Wetzlar, Wetzlar.
- 2013 – Van Ray, (so), Gallery Wagner+Marks, Frankfurt.
- 2013 – Dirty Works # 04, (gr), 30Works Gallery, Cologne.
- 2012 – Expo for Mattia, (gr), Palazzo Filangieri, Naples.
- 2012 – to wild to die, (gr), Gallery Alexandra Grass, Bielefeld.
- 2012 – Dirty Works # 03, (gr), ATM Gallery Berlin, Berlin.
- 2011 – City Leaks, (gr), 30Works Gallery, Cologne.
- 2011 – Van Ray, (so), Plum Gallery, Shanghai.
- 2011 – Dirty Works # 02, (gr), 30Works Gallery, Cologne.

== Literature ==
- Van Ray – What if it's all a lie?, 30works Galerie Köln, 2015.
- What if it's all a lie?, Design Issue, 4/2015.
- Van Ray, Urban Shit, 5/2015.
- Street Art Cologne, Anne Scherer, 2014.
- Van Ray – Popup, 30Works Galerie Köln, 2014.
- Van Ray, Widewalls, Nina K, 7/2014.
- Mauerbotschafter, Letzebuerger Journal, 8/2014.
- Van Ray, Reflect, 3/2013.
- Auf der Straße kostenlos, in der Galerie teuer, Bild Zeitung, 9 December 2011.
- Fancy, um[laut] Magazin, 8/2010.
