= Markus Amm =

English artist

Markus Amm (born 1969, Stuttgart, West Germany) is an artist based in London.

He has shown work internationally in exhibitions including Finding Neverland at Patricia Low Contemporary in Gstaad, Alles in einer Nacht at Tanya Bonakdar in New York City, The Addiction at Gagosian Gallery in Berlin and New Party at The Breeder Projects in Athens.

His work is in the collection of the Hessel Museum of Art, the Los Angeles County Museum of Art, and the San Francisco Museum of Modern Art,
