= Paul Eddie Pfisterer =

German artist

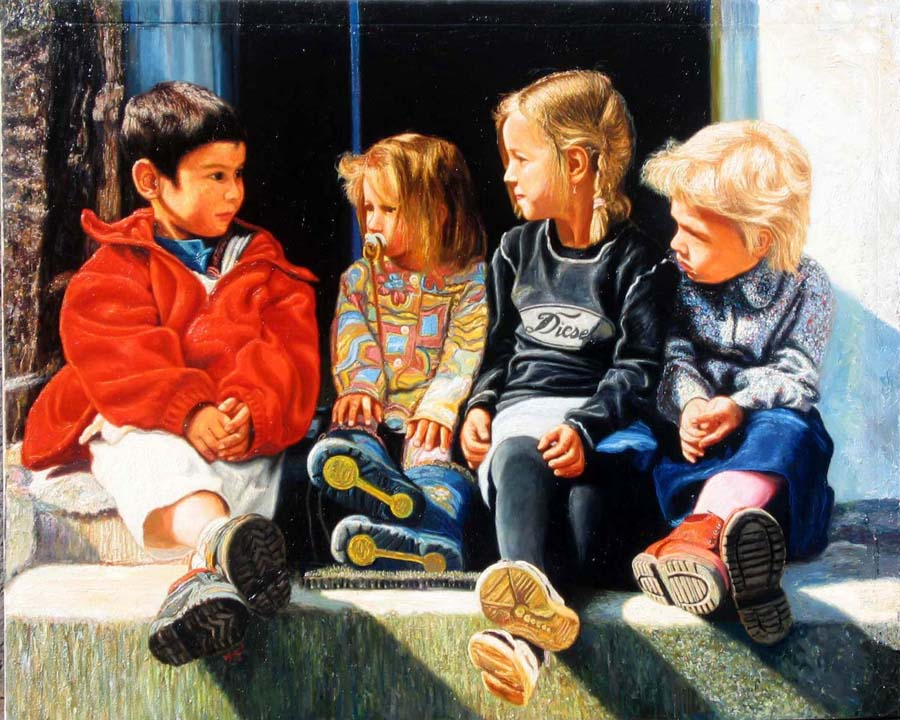
The Children at the Doorstep, 2002

Paul Eddie Pfisterer is a German music and visual artist. He works with oil painting, mixed technique, watercolor, etching, wood carving, sculpture and mural painting.

He developed his own techniques for etching, such as dry point engraving, magnet etching and the punch and flex technique. He invented a formula in color mixing which enabled him to paint a wide range of colours, including old master techniques.

He is also a professional musician and is therefore included in the Lexicon of German Rockbands and Interpreten Rock in Deutschland.

== Early life ==
Pfisterer was born in Waldenburg/Württemberg on 17 June 1951, the son of the painter Otto Pfisterer (Nördlingen/Nizza). In 1966, he trained in technical drawing. He studied in 1974 as a draftsman, painter and etcher under different artists.

== Career ==
From 1974 to 1981 he worked as a professional musician. In 1980, he owned a gallery in Steinau. In 1981, Pfisterer emigrated to Australia and returned to Germany. He lived in Berlin in 1985, and from 1986 to 1990 owned a gallery in Grebenau. In 1991, he moved to Hamburg. Then he settled and established himself in 2006 at Laubach, Germany and entitled as "Hofmaler des Grafen zu Solms-Laubach".

As a graphic artist, Pfisterer made art calendars (Greifenstein calendar, Wetterau-calendar, Brühl-Edition). He worked for banks, Lufthansa, Steigenberger Frankfurter Hof, Hotel Jäger, and Karstadt. He was an art editor for Walter De Gruyter, Scientific Edition. He wrote the Dictionary of Monograms 2 (1995) and Dictionary of Signatures (1999). Eight of his paintings were purchased in 1998 by Museum Würth in Künzelsau.

== Recognition ==
- 1st prize in graphic for the community of German forest protection.
- 1st prize Oberhessische art exhibitions.
- Almost 50 large formatted posters of the Saudi Arabian kings, portraits printed after the paintings of Pfisterer at airports and public buildings in Saudi Arabia. Purchased by Hessen region, different towns, museums and private collectors.
- 1991 entry in the Lexikon der Willingshäuser Malerschule (Lexicon of the Willingshausen school) and Malerschule Kleinsassen (J.Wollmann)
- Numerous Australian paintings and exhibitions.
- Entry in the book Hessen in der deutschen Malerei (Bantzer/Baumerth).
- Contributed works for Grimm brothers.
- Demonstrated etching technique on television (HR 3), radio interviews, newspaper reports and Museum exhibitions.
- Numerous auctions.

== Art dictionaries ==
He appeared in:

- Die Willingshäuser Malerkolonie und die Malerkolonie Kleinsassen (Wollmann)
- Hessen in der deutschen Malerei (Bantzer/Baumerth)
- Monogrammlexikon II (Pfisterer)
- Signaturenlexikon I (Pfisterer)
- Art Data Band 3 (Kierblewsky)
- ADEC 93 (Adec-Production/Eric Michel)
- ADEC 95 (Adec-Production/Eric Michel)
- Mayers
- Allgemeines Lexikon der Kunstschaffenden in Der bildenden Kunst des ausgehenden XX. Jahrhunderts Band 4 (Ziese/Kufferath/Demetz)
- Emanuel Benézit Künstlerlexikon (das Standardlexikon Frankreich!), in 3 Standardwerke der Kunstgeschichte!
- COMANDUCCI (das Standardlexikon für Italien!)
- Künstlerlexikon Hessen-Kassel 1777-2000 (Paul Schmaling)
- Kürschner 2004/5 (bedeutendes Standardwerk für bildende Künstler)
- Allgemeines Lexikon der Kunstschaffenden in Der Bildenden Kunst des ausgehenden XX. Jahrhunderts Band 4 (Ziese/Kufferath/Demetz) Nürnberg 1996

== Auction catalogs ==
- Antikhof Neuenstein, 9. Kunstauktion, 19 May 1990.
- Henry's Auktionen Nr. 41, 17 November 1990; Nr. 73 Samstag, 20 April 1991; Nr. 88, 31 October 1992; Nr. 48, Pos. Nr. 48 01218,
- Antiquitäten Auktionshaus Pöter Schloss Sulzheim, 25 June 1993.
- Arno Winterberg Auktion 34, 35, 40, 42, 44, 48, 51, 54.
- Auktionshaus Wendel, Rudolstadt, (c.1997)
- Tresor am Römer Katalog 33 (c.1986)

== Book illustrations ==
- Reise ins Märchenland (Freund, 1986), Bekanntmachung, Heiteres und Besinnliches (G. Freund 1984)
- 925 Jahre Breungeshain (W. Weitzel 1992), Ludwig Emil Grimm (Gerhard Freund 1990)
- Münzenberg Heimat im Schatten der Burg (Petra und Uwe Müller 1995, 575 S.)
- Märchen, Sagen und Schwänke aus Lauterbach und dem Vogelsbergkreis (Dr. U. Benzel 1991, with illustrations)

== Portfolio ==
- Kunstdruckmappe König Drosselbart (Märchenstraßenverlag 1983)

== Literature ==
- Wasmuth-Bulletin, Burlington Magazine, International Directory of Arts, The Art Bulletin, Art Journal, Frankfurter Rundschau, Neue Gesundheit.
- Graphische Kunst (Edition Curt Visel, Memmingen) Number 51 (1998) Biography and original woodcut supplement.
- Graphische Kunst (Edition Curt Visel, Memmingen) Number 52 (1999) with 16 pictures of his work, and two original supplements (etching and woodcut)

== Collection and museum representations ==
- Bad Homburg town collection, Wiesbaden, Borken
- Museum Steinau/Str., Museum Schotten, Museum Herbstein, Museum Butzbach
- Museum Willingshausen, Museum and collection Würth in Künzelsau
- Museum of Marbel, South Cotabato, Philippines
- A member of South Cotabato, Philippines Arts Council "Socskargen"
- Pronounced by the governor as an Honorary member to the South Cotabato Tourism, Culture and Arts Council

== Exhibitions ==
- Gallery Atelier Periscope
- Museum Schloß Steinau
- Gallery Moderna Bad Kissingen
- Gallery Bilderladen Westerburg
- Gallery Kurotel 2000 Bad Kissingen
- Cafe Theater Frankfurt
- Gallery Steinau, Rathaus Steinau, Ramada Hotel Frankfurt
- Museum Schloß Günderrode
- Märchenland Merkenfritz
- New Gallery Gosford
- Australien, Parramatta
- Box Hill Gallery Melbourne
- St.Marks Parish-Hall Australien
- Gallery Apollon Frei-Laubersheim, Steinau, Büdingen
- Gallery Gedern
- Museum Schloß Gündersrode Höchst, Nidda
- Ortenberg, Schlüchtern
- Gallery Fürstenbahnhof Bad Homburg, Wien
- Amtshaus Steinau, Frankfurt Book Fair 1985
- Gallery Bilderladen Neu-Kölln Berlin
- Gallery Grünberg
- Museum Castle Kolvenburg
- Fulda Artists in Herkules
- Gallery Gebenau
- Gedern
- Fulda Artists in Town Castle of Fulda 1988
- Gallery Kunsthaus Fulda
- Museum Freilichtmuseum Hessenpark 1989
- Gallery Wetzlar
- Cafeteria Karstadt Giessen, Worms
- Farben Jaenisch Frankfurt, sequence of pictures at Kreisanzeiger newspaper for a longer period
- Bad Nauheim
- Bielefeld, Bochum, Bonn
- Antikhof Neuenstein
- Art and Culture School of Konradsdorf
- Touristic Fair 1989 Frankfurt, Museum Fritzlar
- Gallery Basaltwerk Alten-Buseck
- Hersfeld, Giessen
- Gallery Posthof
- Museum Butzbach
- Museum of Schwalm in Willingshausen
- Town Gallery Mragowo/Polen
- Gallery Statt-Museum Herbstein
- Museum Condom South France
- Oberhessische Kunstausstellung Grünberg
- Gallery Reukauf Giessen
- Museum Marbel/Philippinen.
