= Herma Auguste Wittstock =

German performance artist

Herma Auguste Wittstock (born 1977 in Peine, Germany) is a German performance artist. She lives in Berlin. Wittstock has been compared to Marina Abramović in including pain and body exploitation in her work.

Wittstock studied Fine Arts at Braunschweig University of Art from 1999 to 2004 with professors Mara Mattuschka, performance artist Marina Abramović and film maker Birgit Hein. She is a member of Independent Performance Group (IPG).

Among Wittstock's performances is Counting, previously Counting Lesson, which involves counting of hairs on a person's head.
