= Wolfgang Ganter =

German visual artist

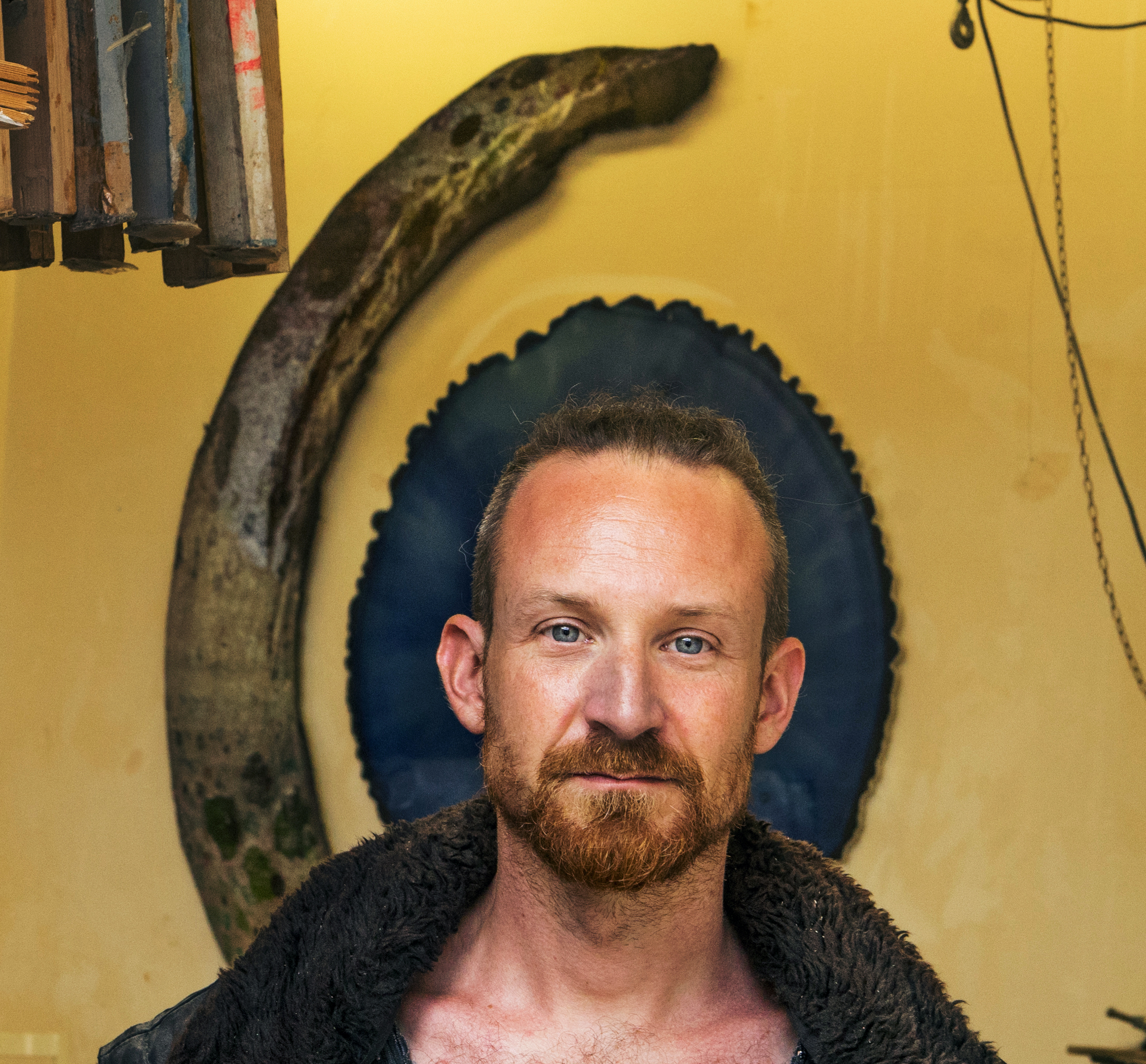
- Born: June 22, 1978 (age 48); Stuttgart, Germany
- Known for: Photographer, visual artist

Wolfgang Ganter (born June 22, 1978, in Stuttgart) is a German photographer and visual artist based in Berlin. He uses bacterial cultures, chemical process, dyes and time to transform the photos of renown artworks, which are then fixed and photographed in detail. His work is also included in permanent collections such as the Museum der Moderne Salzburg, Kunsthalle Mannheim, Futurium, Karolinska Institute and the Städtische Museen Heilbronn.

== Exhibitions (selection) ==
=== Solo exhibitions ===
2022

- Experimentum, Kunsthalle Brennabor, Brandenburg an der Havel, Germany
- Stoffwechsel, Kunstverein Schwäbisch Hall, Schwäbisch Hall, Germany

2019

- Tiny Supernova, Kunsthalle Mannheim, Mannheim, Germany
- Prima Materia, Kunstverein Kunsthaus Potsdam, Potsdam
- Parvus Miraculum, Olsson Gallery, Stockholm
- Afterglow, Burster Gallery, Berlin

2018

- Chef d’Euvre Brisé, Ambacher Contemporary, München
- Parvus Miraculum, Burster Gallery, Karlsruhe

2017

- Chef d’Euvre Brisé, Ambacher Contemporary, Paris
- Wolfgang Ganter, Rockefeller University, New York City
- Wolfgang Ganter, Gallery of the College of Staten Island, New York City

2016

- Regeneratio, Berlin Hyp, Berlin

2015

- Casus Coactus, Burster Gallery, Berlin

2014

- Bactereality, Städtische Galerie, Tuttlingen
- Afterglow, Reiter Gallery, Leipzig
- Six Masterpieces, Olsson Gallery, Stockholm

2013

- Decompositione, Kunststiftung Baden-Württemberg
- Misremember, Rathaus Stuttgart
- TransPORT, Westwerk, Hamburg

2012

- Misremember, Kunststiftung Baden-Württemberg
- Informell Logic, Eli Ridgway Gallery, San Francisco
- Bakterialiät, Olsson Gallery, Stockholm

2012

- Inside, Inside, Cultuurwerf, Vlissingen

2009

- Accidentanalysis, Maud Piquion Gallery, Berlin

2008

- Seasick, Baer Ridgway Exhibitions, San Francisco

2006

- Shake Hands, Förderkreis Kunst und Kultur Offenburg

2005

- 2005: Der Tod ist kein Beinbruch, Karl Heinz Meyer Gallery, Karlsruhe
