= Various & Gould =

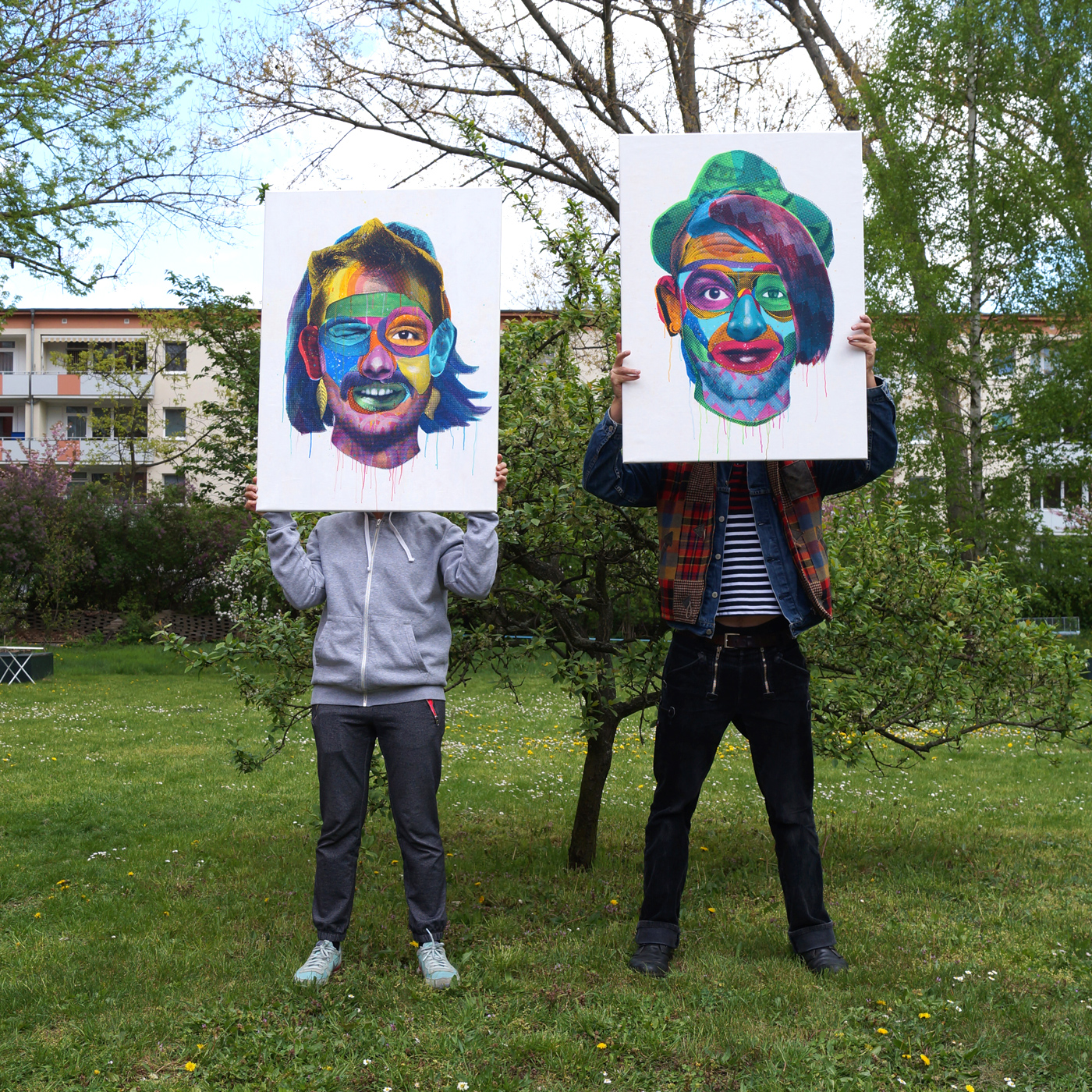
Portrait, 2015

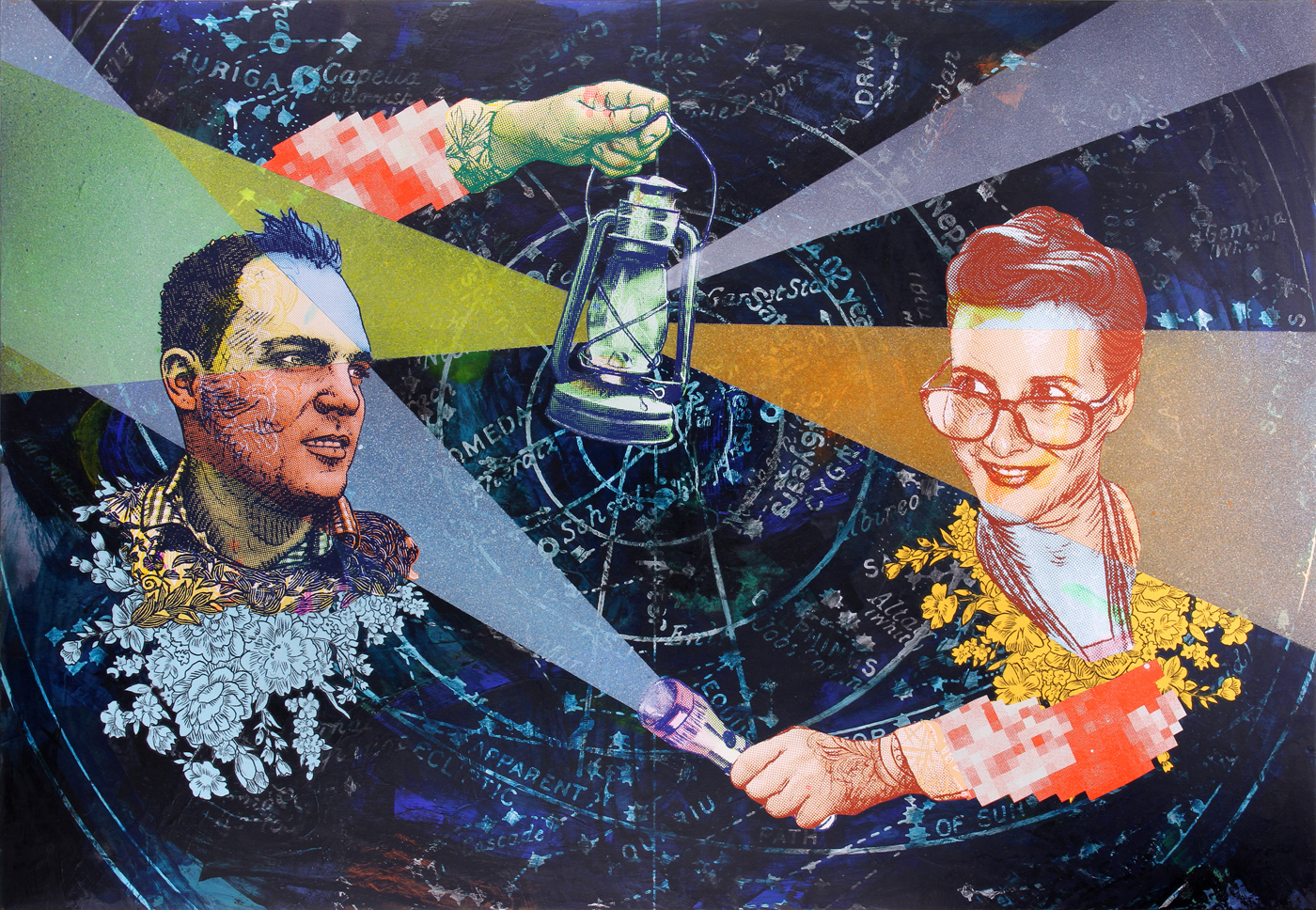
Dark Matter, 2016

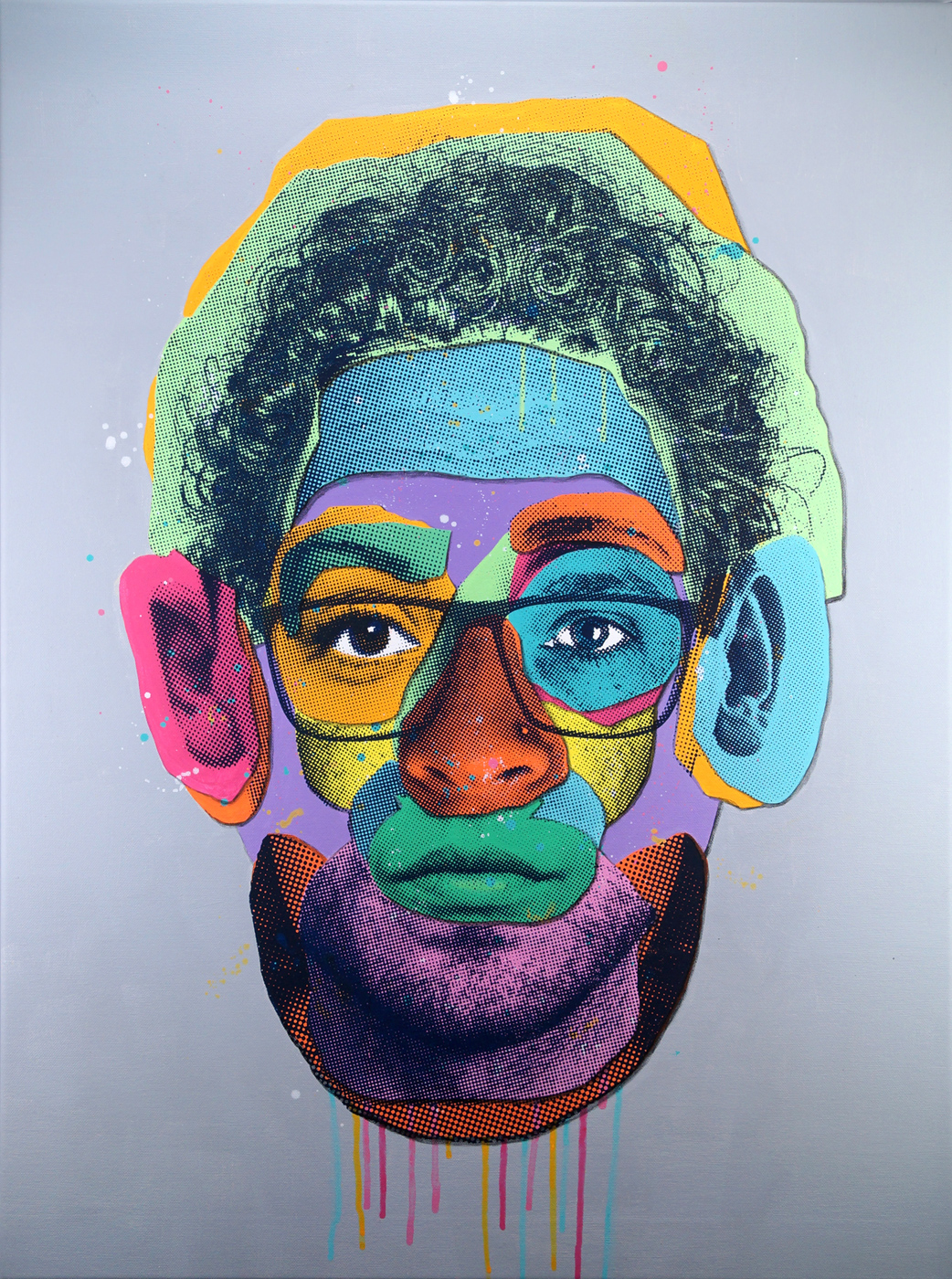
Face Time Canvas 05, 2015

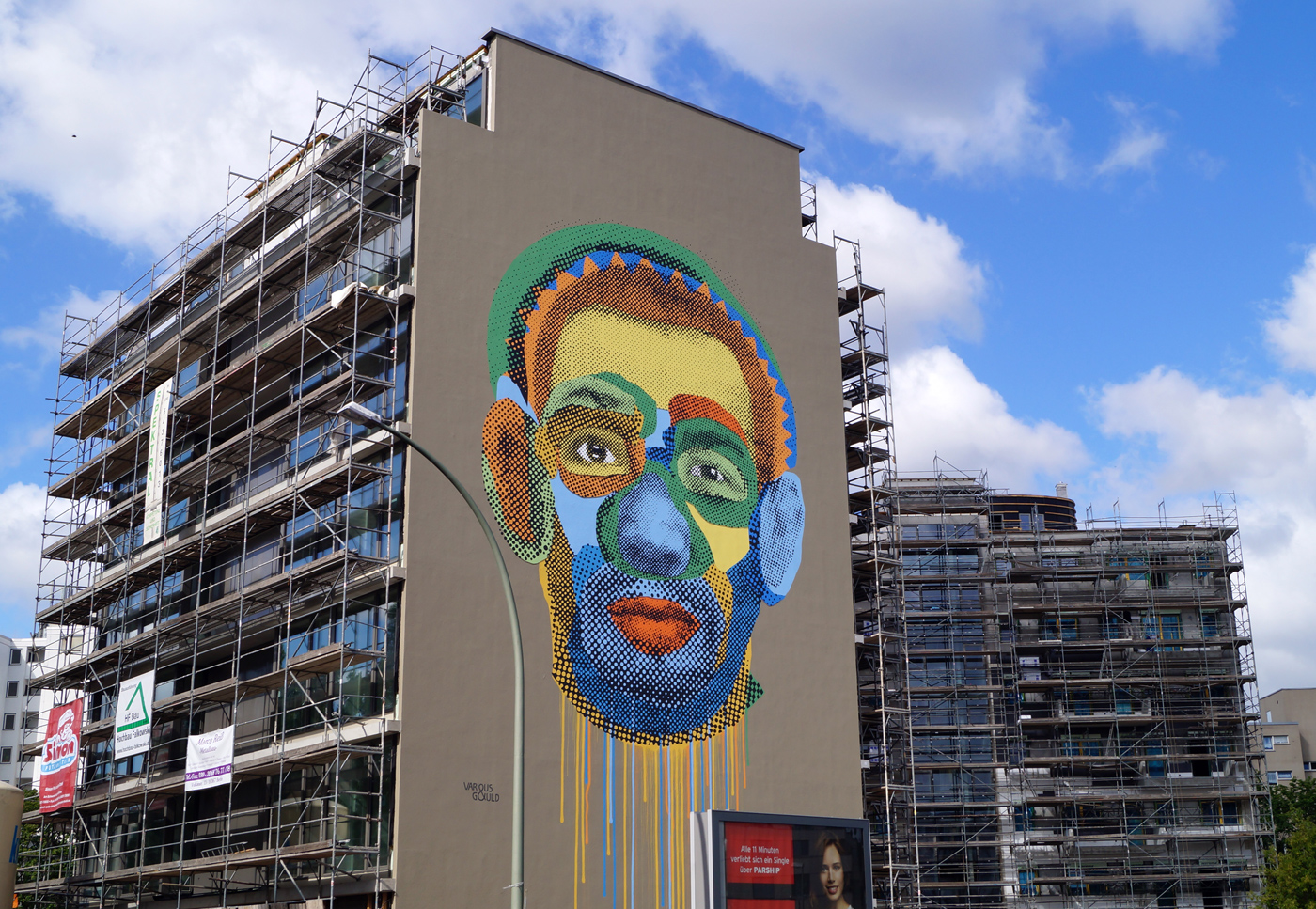
Face Time Mural, Berlin Kreuzberg, 2015

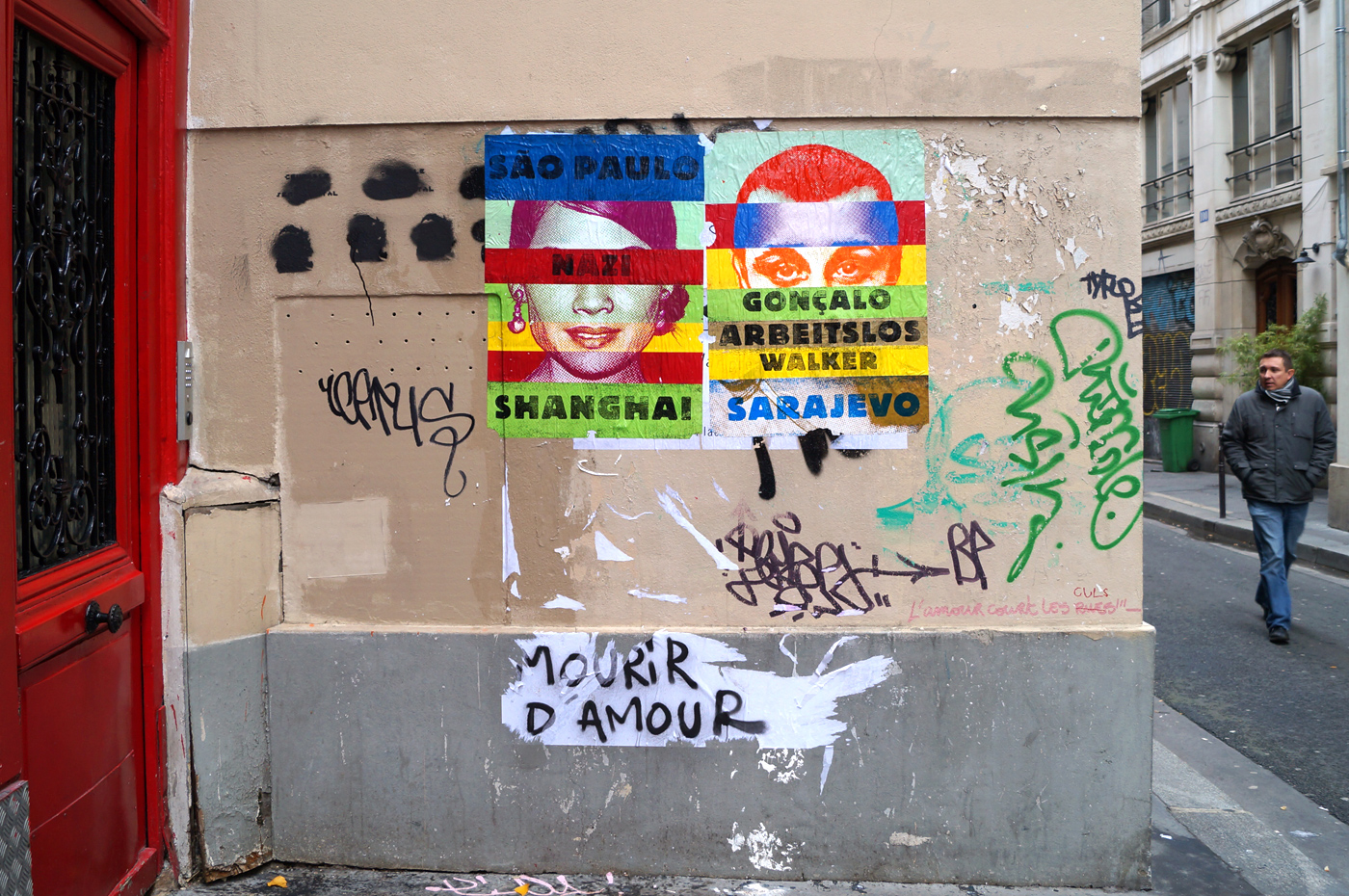
Indentikit, installation view, Paris 2014

Various & Gould is a Berlin-based artist duo.

== Life ==
The artist duo Various & Gould works in collaboration since 2005. After studying at the Berlin-Weissensee School of Art, the artists graduated under the tutelage of Prof Alex Jordan in 2010.

== Art ==
Various & Gould work in screen-printing and collage, but their art also emerges in public performances or installations.

The artist duo deals with socially prominent themes such as work, migration, (sexual) identity, death, religion or the financial crisis. Various & Gould's work is influenced by (political) poster graphics, Dada and Pop Art. Characteristics are vivid colors combined with typography and encrypted messages.

== Exhibitions (selection) ==
- 2020: Kollektive Signaturen, Kunstmuseum Dieselkraftwerk Cottbus, Cottbus, Germany
- 2019: Keine Ewigkeit für Niemand, Neurotitan, Berlin, Germany
- 2018: Imago – a history of portraits, Museum of Urban and Contemporary Art, Munich, Deutschland
- 2016: Permanently Improvised, Anno Domini, San Jose, USA
- 2016: 2te 11te Interventionale, Showroom IG Metall (+ HaL), Berlin, Deutschland
- 2016: Kunst/Plakat/Kunst, Landtag of Brandenburg (+ dkw.), Potsdam, Deutschland
- 2015: Made in Berlin, Galerie Mathgoth, Paris, France
- 2015: Backjumps 20+1, Kunstraum Kreuzberg/Bethanien, Berlin, Germany
- 2013: Wanted Witches - Witches Wanted, Open Walls Gallery, Berlin, Germany
- 2013: The Pressure of Printing, Open Walls Galerie, Berlin, Germany
- 2013: Kopf an Kopf, Kunstmuseum Dieselkraftwerk Cottbus, Germany
- 2012: Backjumps - Junior Issue 2, Kunstraum Kreuzberg/Bethanien, Berlin, Germany
- 2012: ReKOLLEKT V, Kunstraum Kreuzberg/Bethanien, Berlin, Germany
- 2012: Outside in, ALAN Galerie, Istanbul, Turkey
- 2012: Es geht UM die Welt, Kunstmuseum Dieselkraftwerk Cottbus, Germany
- 2012: Nostalgia, Rook & Raven Gallery, London, Great Britain
- 2011: Street Art Saved My Life, C.A.V.E. Gallery, Los Angeles, US
- 2010: Make it fit, Brooklynite Gallery, New York, US
- 2010: Wendezeiten, Kunstmuseum Dieselkraftwerk Cottbus, Germany
- 2010: Help! - Soziale Appelle im Plakat, Museum of Design, Zürich, Switzerland
- 2009: Identity Crisis, Shiv Gallery, London, Great Britain
- 2009: À chacun ses étrangers?, Cité nationale de l’histoire de l’immigration, Paris, France
- 2008: Time Machine, Brooklynite Gallery, New York, US

== Literature ==
- PERMANENTLY IMPROVISED – 15 Years of Urban Print Collage, seltmann+söhne, Berlin, 2019, ISBN 978-3-9466-8873-0
- Randgänge des Gesichts: Kritische Perspektiven auf Sichtbarkeit und Entzug, Trajekte, Zentrum für Literatur- und Kulturforschung Berlin, 2016, ISBN 978-3-7705-6064-6
- WILD, Urban Spree Books, Berlin, 2016
- The Art of Rebellion, Publikat Publishing, 2016, ISBN 978-3-939566-49-6
- Berlin What? – 102 Contemporary Artists, Verlag Ch. Schroer, Berlin, August 2013
- Es geht UM die Welt – Ausstellungskatalog, DKW, Cottbus, 2012
- Trespass 2012, Taschen Press, Cologne, 2011
- Street Art Cookbook, Dokument Verlag, Sweden, 2010
- Urban Interventions, Gestalten Press, Berlin, 2010
- Help! – Ausstellungskatalog, Museum für Gestaltung, Zurich, 2009
- Untitled II, Pro-Actif Communications, Darlington, 2009
- Street Art – Legenden zur Straße, Archiv der Jugendkulturen Verlag, Berlin, 2008/09
- 100 Beste Plakate 07 – Ausstellungskatalog, Verlag Hermann Schmidt, Mainz, 2008
- Urban Art Photography, Gestalten Press, Berlin, 2008
- Urban Illustration Berlin, Gingko Press, Hamburg, 2007
- Street Art – Die Stadt als Spielplatz, Archiv der Jugendkulturen Verlag, Berlin, 2006
