= Ingrid Hermentin =

Ingrid Hermentin (born 26 September 1951 in Löwenstein, West Germany) is an artist and pioneer of serial computer graphics.

== Life ==
From 1969 to 1979, Hermentin was trained in the medical field and worked at various hospitals in the Stuttgart area. In 1980, she spent several months in Canada and the US. Since 1981, Hermentin has lived and worked in Marburg. In 1983, she launched her career as an artist with several study trips to Italy. Her focus has been on computer graphics since 1990. She has since had numerous exhibitions in Germany and abroad.

== Concept ==
Linking people, computers, and art, Hermentin regards her works as "aesthetical reflections of a world organized through media. Our media experiences have become epistemological and pragmatic motivators and originators for our consciousness. Our existence, or our perception of it during an instant of experienced "reality", signifies itself as a synthetic image and is then expressed in a distanced fashion”. [translated from ] To show the ambivalent nature of the technical present and to give a form to the phenomena of signifiers, which are converted into information and stored, requires, according to Hermentin, the using of a distancing instrument: the computer. “The extension of thought through electronic distance must be read as a spontaneous and reflected creation. The significant aspect here is the representation of altered forms and the endlessness that becomes imaginable through a series. ... The desire for the imaginable but not for measurable space produces the sign. The resistance of the material is not broken by strength and destruction, but rather through calculation”. [translated from ] “The overlapping of intellectual patterns of thoughts in art, philosophy and science, in resonance and connection with the memory, knowledge and experience, make appear various forms of phenomena”. [translated from ]

== Technical development ==
While Hermentin with her "digital collages" in the inkjet print format up to Din-A3 laid the basis for her printed graphics (1991-1994), she also developed a serial inkjet printing method for producing large image formats based on Din-A3 prints (1993-1994). Simultaneously, she used the upcoming large format digital printing for serial works in the Din-A1 format (since 1992) or Din-A0 format (since 1994) and developed a glazing technique for her "synthetic images" in order to produce more brilliant colors, using a large format inkjet printer with non-fading colors since 1998.
