= Karin Putsch-Grassi =

German potter (born 1960)

Karin Putsch-Grassi is a potter.

== Biography ==
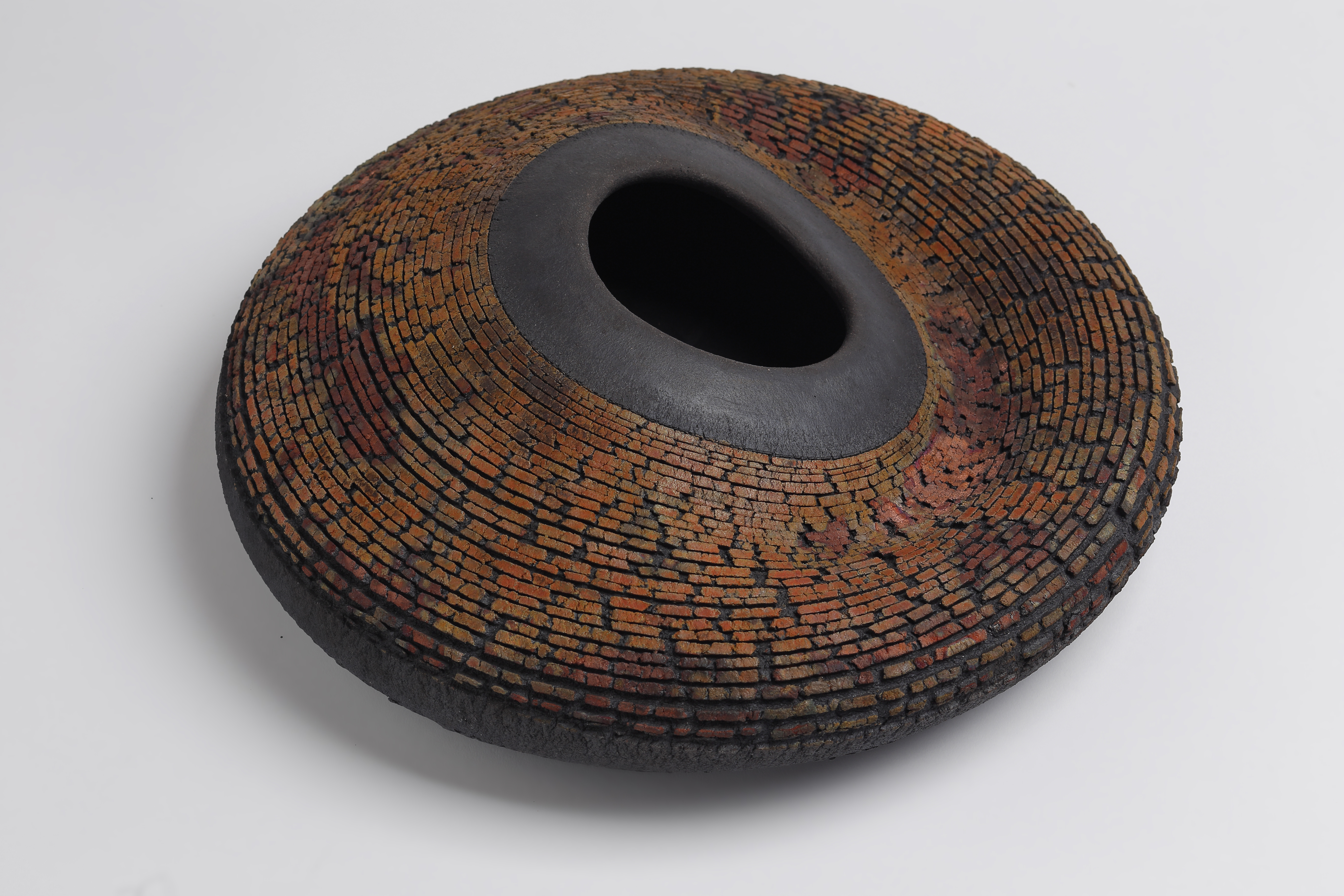
Work of Karin Putsch-Grassi

After an apprenticeship in the studio of Albrecht Kiedaisch in Tübingen Putsch-Grassi began her studies in ceramics 1982 at "Istituto statale d’Arte” in Florence with Salvatore and Stefano Cipolla.

Her most recent work follows a newly developed technique named "Figulinae", which consists of assembling soft raw stoneware or porcelain vessels and compressing them to form a new entity.

Putsch-Grassi's work has been exhibited in personal exhibitions in Italy, Germany, Poland and Japan as well as in numerous group exhibitions worldwide. Furthermore, her works are displayed in various museums. Putsch-Grassi is an elected member of the International Academy of Ceramics.

== Awards (selection) ==
- 2012 First Prize “Rassegna Internazionale di Ceramica Contemporanea”, Albissola Marittima
- 2016 Second Prize "Ceramic & Colours Award", Faenza
- 2021 Third Prize "Premio MIDeC per Design Ceramico", Cerro di Laveno Mombello

== Sources ==
- Website of the International Academy of Ceramics
- Flyer of Karin Putsch-Grassi's Personal Exhibion inside the Civiltà Contadina Museum in Figline Valdarno
- Catalog of Putsch-Grassi's Kyoto exhibition in 2016
- Ceramics Monthly, September 2015, (Statement of Putsch-Grassi and pictures of her work), p. 42
- La Ceramica Moderna & Antica”, no. 301, 2018 , ISSN 1123-816X, Coverstory, pp. 8–11
- S., Federico (September 2018). "Karin Putsch-Grassi: dalla Germania all'Italia nel nome della ceramica". Archived from the original on September 3, 2018.
- Ugo La Pietra. "Fittile. Artigianato artistico Italiano della ceramica contemporanea", p. 50

== Documentation in publications ==
- Ray Hemachandra, Jim Romberg: 500 Raku. Bold Explorations of a Dynamic Ceramics Technique, New York 2011, ISBN 978-1-60059-294-2
- Linda Kopp: The Best of 500 Ceramics. Celebrating a Decade in Clay, New York 2012, ISBN 978-1-4547-0141-5, p. 336
- Duncan Hooson, Anthony Quinn: The Workshop Guide to Ceramics: A Fully Illustrated Step-by-Step Manual. Techniques and Principles of Design, Barron's 2012, ISBN 978-0-7641-6461-3
- Edoardo Pilia. Ceramica Artistica: materiali, tecniche, storia, ISBN 9781718076907, pp. 98–99
- Duncan Hooson and Anthony Quinn. The Workshop Guide to Ceramics, Thames & Hudson, ISBN 0500516219, pp. 211, 218, 248
- Ray Hemachandra and Julia Galloway. 500 Vases: Contemporary Explorations of a Timeless Form, Lark Books, ISBN 9781600592461, pp. 68, 272
