= Shane Cooper (artist) =

American software developer

- Known for: Installation art
- Style: Internet interactive art

Shane Cooper is a visual effects software developer, and an installation artist specializing in Internet and interactive art.

As a visual effects developer, he has contributed work to such films as Avatar, the Lord of the Rings trilogy, Rise of the Planet of the Apes, Dawn of the Planet of the Apes, The Adventures of Tintin, and King Kong. In 2015, he was awarded an Academy Scientific and Technical Award by The Academy of Motion Picture Arts and Sciences.

As an artist, there are common themes emphasized in his works. Most of them feature interactivity with the viewer and computer learning. In many of his works, the actions of the viewer are somehow recorded and later used in the art itself. His work 'Remote Control' was made part of the permanent exhibition at The ZKM - Center for Art and Media Karlsruhe.

He has also worked with musicians, such as Devo in Santa Monica, California in 1996 and Graham Nash in Los Angeles, in 1995.

== Installation art ==
In Cooper’s 1999 art installation Remote Control, a television displays an anchorman that looks and sounds real, yet is completely computer-generated. The newscast being shown is generated in real-time, using live feeds from various Internet news sources. A remote control with two buttons, labeled “Truth 1” and “Truth 2”, allows the viewer to choose between two channels: one where the news being reported is true, and one where the facts have been reversed. This work is now in the permanent exhibition at The ZKM - Center for Art and Media Karlsruhe.

In Reflection (2002) (also known as “Parasight”), the viewer stands in front of a wall that has an image of another person, standing in a similar way as them, projected onto it. When the viewer moves in any way, the image projected on the screen changes to match the new way that the viewer is standing. The result is that the viewer sees their “reflection” on the screen, except that the reflection is in fact the image of a previous visitor. In addition, every viewer is also filmed and added to the database of images that can be projected. In this way, every new viewer adds to the exhibit, and increases the accuracy of the next viewer's reflection.

In Echo (2009), Cooper designed what was to be an heirloom that steadily acquires sounds in its environment, and plays them back years in the future - at the same yearly time and date they were recorded. Sounds that it absorbs may possibly be echoed back many times in the future, at the same exact time of day and day of year that they were originally recorded.

Feed (2006) and Life Support (2009) both examine ways in which art literally survives according human presence.

== Early internet art ==
Shane has also created several early Internet art works which still appear at his personal website.

Live (1998) is a simulated chatroom, which is actually full of bots. The bots learn new conversations from the humans that come into the room, which is another example of Cooper's recurring theme of the viewer leaving an impression on the artwork itself. It also features a “live webcam” that is actually a series of images that repeat over and over, with only the timestamp changing.

Caption (1998) is a black web page showing only an image and a string of text. Usually, the pair appears to have a meaning of some sort, making it seem like the text was written specifically to go with the image. However, the image and text are chosen completely at random. (This can be verified by simply reloading the page until the same image appears twice, in which case it will most likely be matched with a different text string.) The project serves to illustrate how the human mind will find a link between any two randomly matched items.

== Notable exhibitions ==
- Various items at F.I.L.E. Electronic Language International Festival in São Paulo 1999
- Various items atVisionNetwork in Tokyo 1999
- Remote Control, in net_condition , ZKM, Karlsruhe, Germany 1999-2001
- Remote Control, at GFT Creative Lab, Berlin 2001
- Remote Control in Graz, Austria 2001
- Reflection at Intermedium2, ZKM, Karlsruhe, Germany 2002
- Reflection at Volkswagen AG in Berlin 2002
- Remote Control in Vectors: Digital Art in our Time, New York Digital Salon, New York 2003
- Remote Control in Experimenta's House of Tomorrow, Melbourne 2003
- Reflection in Ciber:Art Bilbao 2004 in Bilbao Spain
- Remote Control in Reality Show, Aarau, Switzerland, 2005
- Live in Radiodays, De Appel Center for Contemporary Art, Amsterdam 2005
- Remote Control in Kunstfest Weimar, "Masterpieces of Art from the ZKM Karlsruhe Collection", The Bauhaus, Weimar, Germany, 2005
- Reflection at Ottawa School of Art, Ottawa, Canada, 2005
- Feed at Massey University, Wellington, New Zealand, 2006
- Feed at MOCA Taipei, Taiwan, 2007
- Relapse at Gallery 155B Ottawa, Canada, 2007
- Remote Control in YOU_ser. Das Jahrhundert des Konsumenten (The Century of the Consumer) Germany 2008
- Echo in Infinite Libraries, Crewest Gallery, Los Angeles 2009
- Life Support in Bouillants #1, Le Diapason (Université de Rennes 1 – Campus de Beaulieu) / Les Bouillants (Vern sur Seiche) / Le Volume (espace culturel de Vern sur Seiche) / La Station VasteMonde à Saint-Brieuc (espace de création dédié à l’art contemporain), France 2009
