= Gabriel Zehender =

German painter

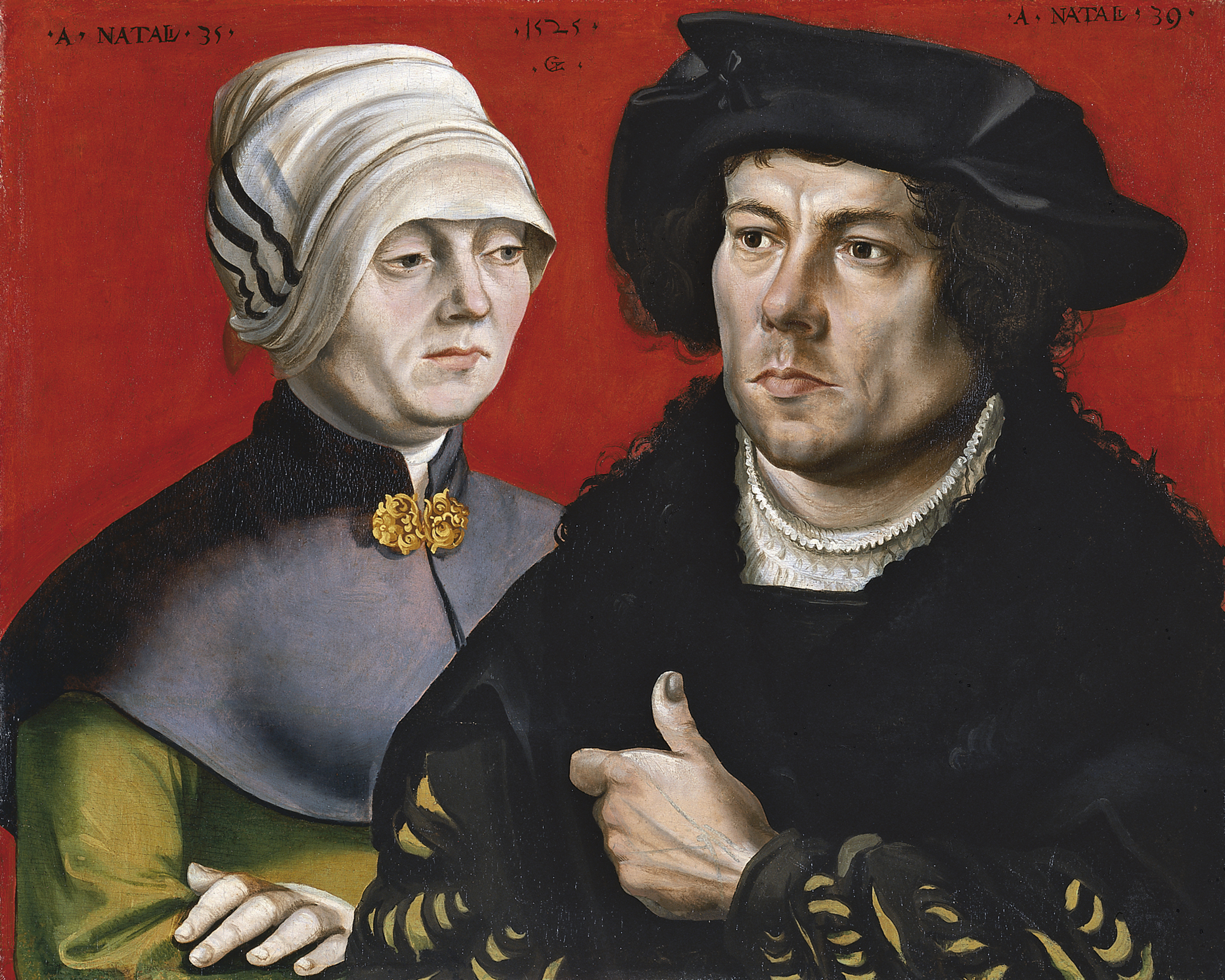
Portrait of a married couple by Gabriel Zehender, 1525

Gabriel Zehender was a German painter and printer believed to have been born in Grossmausdorf, and active in Basel. He has frequently been identified with the "monogrammist GZ", an artist known to have been active at about that time. He was mainly active from 1527 to 1535 although the woodcut "Christ on the Cross between the Virgin and Saint John", is believed to date from 1515.

Little is known of Zehender's life; records indicate that he was admitted to Basel's guild of painters in 1529, at which point he was granted citizenship. By 1534, however, his fortunes appear to have turned, for in that year his wife's property was seized; in 1535 he was listed as a fugitive in town records. Nothing further is known about him, and few works have been ascribed to his hand.
