= Friederike Sieburg =

German artist (1761–1835)

Friederike Sieburg (1761–1835) was a German pastellist.

Sieburg was born in Berlin. Daniel Chodowiecki encouraged her to show her work, and she exhibited pastel portraits at the academy in Berlin in 1788, 1793, and 1794. Her sister Philippine was also a painter.
