= Silke Schatz =

German artist (born 1967)

- Born: 1967 (age 58–59); Celle, West Germany
- Education: Braunschweig University of Art
- Occupation: Artist
- Children: 3

Silke Schatz (born 1967, Celle, West Germany) is a German artist based in Cologne.

== Life ==
From 1987 until 1995, she attended Hochschule für Bildende Künste Braunschweig (the Braunschweig Academy of Fine Arts), interrupted in 1991-92 by a stay in Chicago, where she studied at the School of Art Institute of Chicago. In 1995, she was a master student of Thomas Huber. From 2006 to 2007 she worked as a mentor in the Department of Fine Arts at the Hochschule Hannover.

Schatz makes drawings, sculptures, and installations. She has shown work internationally in exhibitions including Manifesta 5 in San Sebastien, Drawing on Space at Project Arts Centre in Dublin, International Paper at UCLA Hammer Museum and A Nova Geometria at Galeria Fortes Vilaca in São Paulo. She is represented by Meyer Riegger in Karlsruhe and Wilkinson Gallery in London.

She currently lives with her husband and three daughters in Cologne.
