= Dorothea Chandelle =

German pastellist (1784–1866)

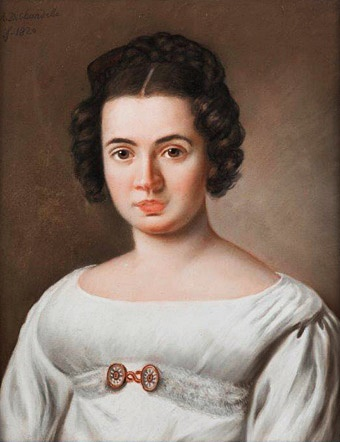
Frau Oberst Busch (portrait by Dorothea Chandelle, 1820)

Maria Dorothea Walpurgis Chandelle (22 July 1784 – 17 March 1866) was a German pastellist.

== Life ==
Chandelle was born on 22 July 1784 in Frankfurt am Main, the third daughter of eight children of the Frankfurt pastellist and postal official Andreas Joseph Chandelle (1763–1820) and his wife Anna Rosina née Wiesen (1752–1832). Matthäus Georg von Chandelle, the ennobled Bishop of Speyer, was her uncle. The Frankfurt sculptor Cornelius Andreas Donett (1683–1748) was one of her great-grandfathers.

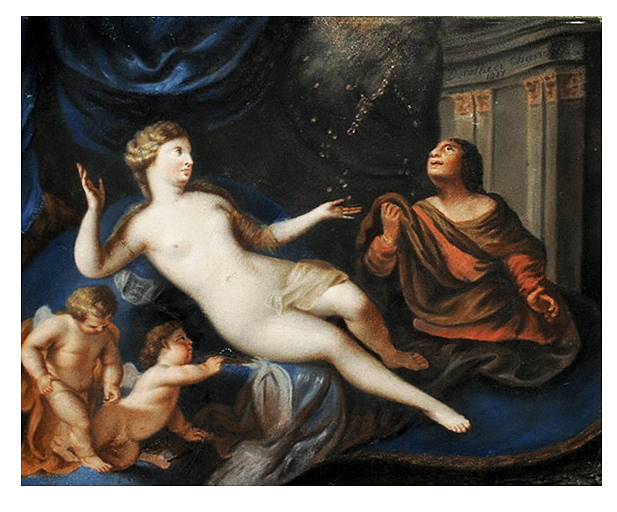
Danaë (1817)

Chandelle learned pastel drawing from her father and mainly created portraits, flower paintings, and religious depictions. In 1921, Lothar Brieger wrote in his work Das Pastell: "The most outstanding native Frankfurt pastel painters are Andreas Joseph Chandelle and his daughter Dorothea".

She died in 1866, almost blind and impoverished.
