= Ada Mee =

German artist (born 1946)

- Born: 1946 (age 79–80); Thuringia, Germany
- Occupations: Artist; photographer
- Children: 1
- Website: www.ada-mee.de/home

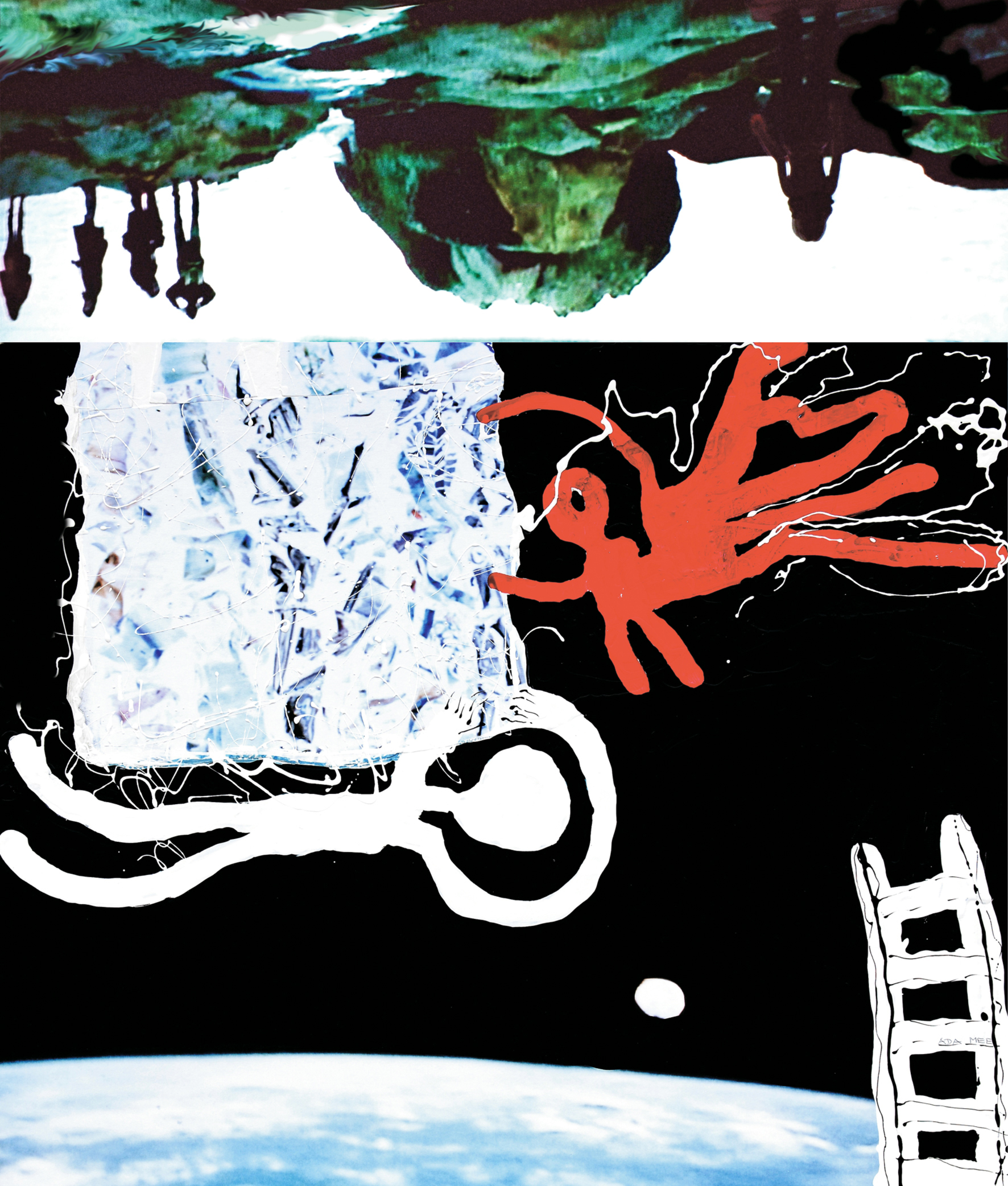
Antipoden by Ada Mee, 2015, lithography

Ada Mee (born 1946) is a German artist based in Heidelberg who works across various mediums, including painting, lithography and photography.

== Life ==
Ada Mee was born 1946 in Thuringia and lived in Jena until her escape to the Federal Republic of Germany in 1952. She grew up in Bremen, the Eifel, the Swabian Jura and Stuttgart, where she graduated from school. She studied architecture in Karlsruhe, finishing as a qualified engineer. She currently lives in Heidelberg and is married with one daughter.

== Career ==
Hommage an Charlie Hebdo by Ada Mee, 2015, staged photo art

Das Wunder von Puijiang and E-Mann by Ada Mee, 2013 and 2015, staged conceptual art

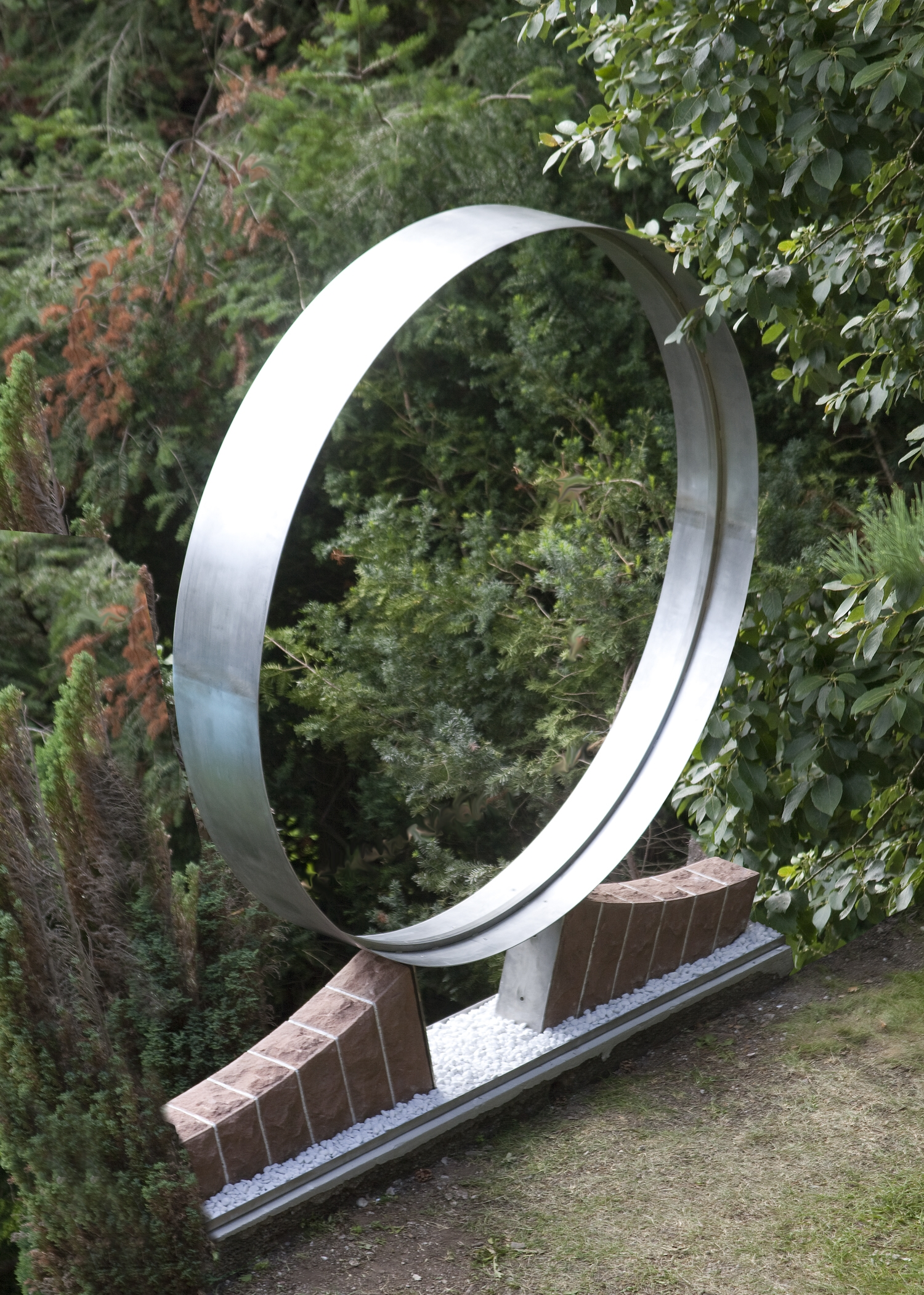
Der Ring zum Richard-Wagner-Jahr by Ada Mee, 2013, object made of two Neckar-Odenwald sandstone blocks with dummy joints, ring and pedestal made of V2A steel

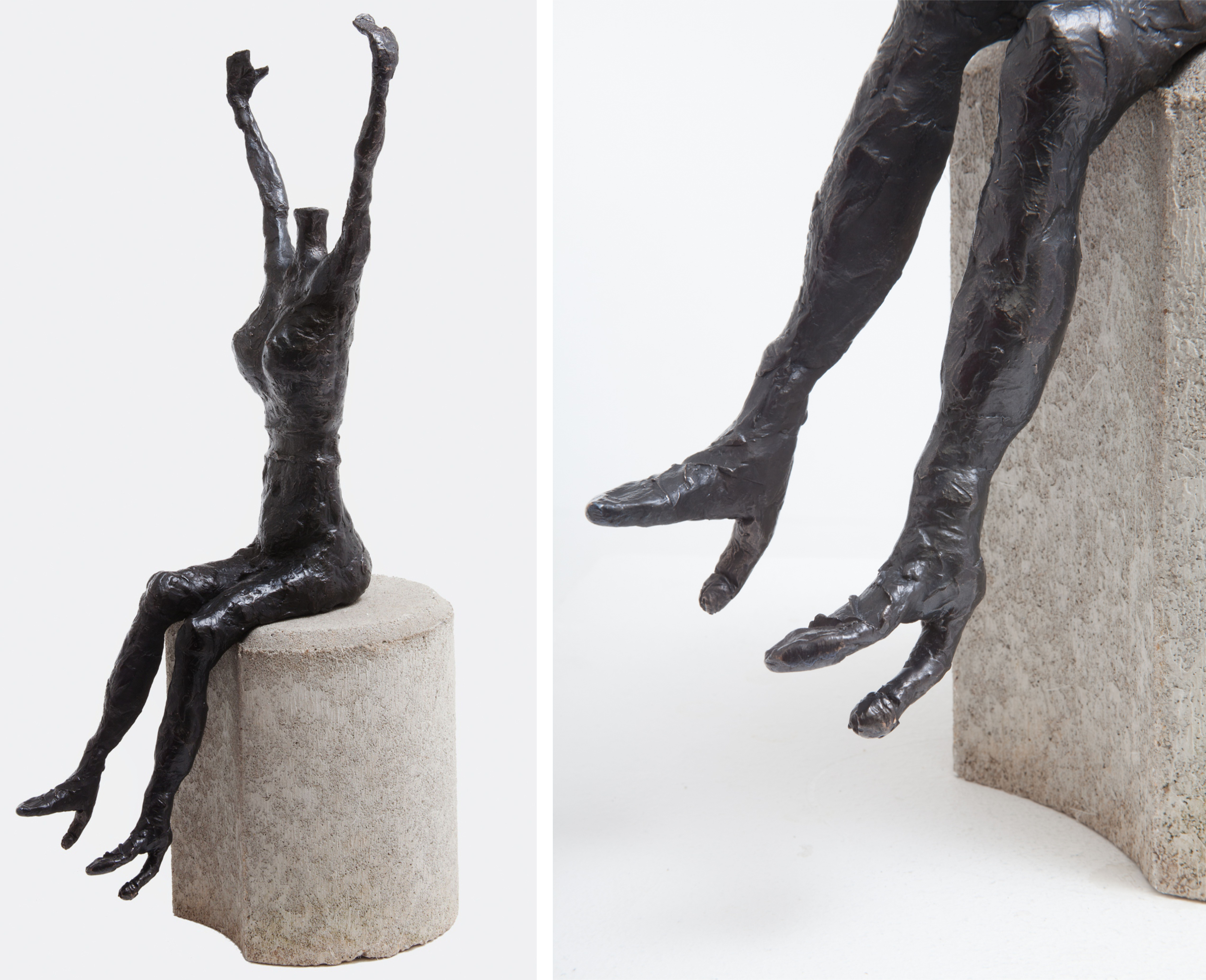
Conchita, unterwegs zwischen den Geschlechtern by Ada Mee, 2014, bronze, Karl Casper casting

Mee is a member of the Bundesverband Bildender Künstlerinnen und Künstler (German Association of Fine Artists), the Heidelberger Forum für Kunst (Arts Forum of Heidelberg) and the Kunsthöfle Gallery in Stuttgart-Bad Cannstatt.

Mee's materials include acrylic paint, watercolour, gouache, pencil, Indian ink on wood, card and various paper types. Mee refers to her photo art on canvas as "application art", which involves the artistic transformation of primary structures through painting and/or digital plots. In her process, Ada Mee combines painting with her own photographs.

=== Staged conceptual art ===
One example of her conceptual art is Das Wunder von Puijang ('The Wonder of Puijang'), which shows an infant born while the mother was squatting over a toilet who slipped into a waste tube and was saved by a cut in the tube.

== Recognition and awards ==
- 2023: nominated for the 29th Mainz Art Prize, Eisenturm
- 2019: nominated for the Perron Art Prize, Frankenthal
- 2013: election for HEISE Kunstpreis 2014
- 2009: promotion by Stiftungen Landesbank-Baden-Württemberg, Catalogue: Lithographien vom Stein
- 2008: promotion by Stiftungen Landesbank-Baden-Württemberg, Catalogue: Maroc mon amour. 1996, Malerei zur Ausstellung im Presseclub Bonn
- 2006: professional recognition "UnFAIRblümt", Haus der Demokratie und Menschenrechte, Berlin
- 2006: art prize of the county Alzey-Worms
- 2005: election for the graphical calendar by Johann Kasper Zeus, 2006, Kronach

== Exhibitions ==
=== International and supraregional group exhibitions ===
- 1993: Everarts gallery, Paris
- 1996: Presseclub Bonn, Maroc mon amour
- 2002, 1998: Foire Internationale Lac Luxembourg, Salon de Printemps, Letzeburger Artisten Center
- 2011, 2008, 2006, 2004, 1999: Wilhelm–Fabry–Museum Hilden
- 2013, 2005, 2004, 2003, 2002, 2001, 2000: Mini Print International of Cadaques, Spain
- 2000: City Museum Halle an der Saale, Halle und das Salz der Erde
- 2000: City Museum Pforzheim, Drogen
- 2014, 2006, 2002: Miniatur International Fürstenwalde, Spree
- 2004: international Licher photography prize
- 2005: Women Museum Bonn
- 2005: Museum van Bommeln van Dam, Venlo, Niederlande
- 2015, 2007, 2005: Kunstforum Rheinbach '99 e. V., Kunst auf dem Campus
- 2007: Castle Museum city of Schwarzenberg, art und figura
- 2008: Third Beijing International Art Biennale China, Peking
- 2008: Senckenberg Museum, Frankfurt am Main, Senckenberg-Brunnen
- 2012: Museum Zündorfer Wehrturm, Cologne
- 2014, 2013, 2012, 2009: Marler Kunststern, Marl
- 2014, 2013: Internationale Biennale Hamburg

=== Solo exhibitions (excerpt) ===
- 1991: Villa Meixner Brühl, collection of the KulturForums Europa, Schicksale
- 1992: town hall Heilbronn, Steindrucke
- 1993: Mettnau-Radolfzell, Menschen – Landschaften
- 1997: Adelfinger Gallery, Lampertheim, Gemalt-Gedruckt-Geformt
- 1999: Cas Karlsruhe, Positiv
- 2007: Bad Bergzaberner KunstSaison
- 2010: Galerie Kunsthöfle, Stuttgart, code 08-21
- 2011: 6th Bergzabener KunstSaison at the castle of the dukes of Zweibrücken
- 2013: Museum für ostdeutsche und osteuropäische Kunst, Sank Julian
- 2015: Galerie Kunsthöfle, Stuttgart, Mensch wer bist du?

=== Further supraregional exhibitions (excerpt) ===
- 2015: Inszenierung der Realität, Heidelberger Forum für Kunst
- 2015: Sportlich, Heidelberger Forum für Kunst
- 2014: Illustrierte Gedichte von Christian-Morgenstern, Werder (Havel)
- 2013: Wellen, QQTec, Hilden
- 2013: Heimat, Heise-Kunstpreis-Kalender 2014, Dessau
- 2012: genug ist genug, Heidelberger Forum für Kunst
- 2012: Wertschöpfung, Galerie Kunsthöfle, Stuttgart
- 2010: Nachts, Heidelberger Forum für Kunst
- 2009: Visionen, 10. Kunstkreuz Berlin-Kreuzberg
- 2008: Die Freiheit, die ich meine, 9. KunstKreuz Berlin-Friedrichshain
- 2008: SpielArt, Landesausstellung des Bundesverbandes Bildender Künstler
- 2008: Zirkus, VIII. Jesteburger Kunstwoche
- 2008: Im Namen der Lippischen Rose, Kunst- und Designpreis
- 2007: Überzeichnet, Heidelberger Forum für Kunst
- 2006: Schaufenster à la Art, Kunstpreis des Landkreises Alzey-Worms
- 2006: Die Kunst des Alterns, Caritas Altenhilfe, Berlin
- 2006: Bewegung, Dynamik und Kraft, Kunstpreis Wesseling
- 2006: wie die sachen oft querre gehen, Art Prize of the City of Augsburg
- 2005: Johann Kasper Zeus-Kalender 2006, Kronach
- 2005: Nibelungenlied, AmtsHausGalerie, Freudenberg
- 2004: Grenzfälle, VI. Kunstwoche Jesteburg
- 2004: Zeitgenössische bildende Kunst, Salzburg
- 2002: Reaktion-Bilder, Hermann Hesse Calw International
- 2002: Literarischer Simrock-Freiligrath-Weg, Bad Honnef
- 2001: Welde Galerie, Schwetzingen
- 2001: Kunst im Burgrafiat, Alzey
- 2000: Jubiläumsbilder, Gallery of the Sparkasse Karlsruhe
- 2000: Sichtweisen, Öhringer Schloss, Öhringen
- 2015, 2014, 2013, 2012, 2011, 2010, 2007: Heidelberger Forum für Kunst
