= Eberhard Schulze =

German mosaic artist

Eberhard Schulze is a German mosaic artist.

== Biography ==
He was known for his underground artwork with Hans Unger. These mosaic pieces are based on London sites and he has also done works of art by himself using resources such as slate and glass. Schulze was forced to give up mosaic-making, when a spinal injury forced him into early retirement. In 1965, Schulze and Unger created a large mosaic of the crucifixion for St Jude's Catholic church in Wigan. Between 1962 and 1970, Schulze designed several posters for London Transport.

He went on to develop a successful career as a specialist aquarist, becoming England's leading discus fish breeder. He has written a book on discus fish called Discus Fish - The King of all Aquarium Fish.

He now lives in Nonthaburi in Thailand.
