= National Register of Historic Places listings in Beaver County, Utah =

Location of Beaver County in Utah

This is a list of the National Register of Historic Places listings in Beaver County, Utah.

This is intended to be a complete list of the properties and districts on the National Register of Historic Places in Beaver County, Utah, United States. Latitude and longitude coordinates are provided for many National Register properties and districts; these locations may be seen together in a map.

There are 114 properties and districts listed on the National Register in the county. Another 3 sites in the county were once listed, but have since been removed.

This National Park Service list is complete through NPS recent listings posted July 10, 2026.

== Current listings ==
| | Name on the Register | Image | Date listed | Location | City or town | Description |
|---|---|---|---|---|---|---|
| 1 | John Ashworth House | John Ashworth House | November 29, 1983 (#83003830) | 110 S. 100 West; 38°16′21″N 112°38′36″W | Beaver | |
| 2 | John Ashworth House | John Ashworth House | November 29, 1983 (#83003828) | 115 S. 200 West; 38°16′21″N 112°38′39″W | Beaver | |
| 3 | James Atkin House | James Atkin House | September 17, 1982 (#82004075) | 260 W. 300 North; 38°16′43″N 112°38′46″W | Beaver | |
| 4 | Atkins and Smith House | Atkins and Smith House | April 15, 1983 (#83004390) | 390 N. 400 West; 38°16′46″N 112°38′53″W | Beaver | |
| 5 | Caleb Baldwin House | Caleb Baldwin House | November 30, 1983 (#83003834) | 195 S. 400 East; 38°16′18″N 112°38′03″W | Beaver | |
| 6 | William Barton House | William Barton House | September 17, 1982 (#82004076) | 295 N. 300 East; 38°16′41″N 112°38′09″W | Beaver | |
| 7 | Beaver City Library | Beaver City Library | April 15, 1983 (#83004391) | 55 W. Center St. 38°16′26″N 112°38′32″W | Beaver | |
| 8 | Beaver County Courthouse | Beaver County Courthouse | October 6, 1970 (#70000622) | 90 E. Center St. 38°16′26″N 112°38′23″W | Beaver | |
| 9 | Beaver Opera House | Beaver Opera House | February 11, 1982 (#82004078) | 55 E. Center St. 38°16′28″N 112°38′24″W | Beaver | |
| 10 | Beaver Relief Society Meetinghouse | Beaver Relief Society Meetinghouse | November 29, 1983 (#83003837) | 51 N. 100 East; 38°16′29″N 112°38′23″W | Beaver | |
| 11 | Edward Bird House | Edward Bird House | April 15, 1983 (#83004392) | 290 E. Center St. 38°16′26″N 112°38′11″W | Beaver | Pink stone, built in 1893 in vernacular Second Empire style. |
| 12 | John Black House | John Black House | September 17, 1982 (#82004079) | 595 N. 100 West; 38°16′55″N 112°38′36″W | Beaver | |
| 13 | Joseph Bohn House | Joseph Bohn House | September 17, 1982 (#82004080) | 355 S. 200 West; 38°16′09″N 112°38′40″W | Beaver | |
| 14 | Alexander Boyter House | Alexander Boyter House | April 15, 1983 (#83004393) | 590 N. 200 West; 38°16′55″N 112°38′40″W | Beaver | |
| 15 | James Boyter House | James Boyter House | April 15, 1983 (#83004394) | 90 W. 200 North; 38°16′38″N 112°38′34″W | Beaver | |
| 16 | James Boyter Shop | James Boyter Shop | April 15, 1983 (#83004395) | 50 W. 200 North; 38°16′37″N 112°38′32″W | Beaver | |
| 17 | George Albert Bradshaw House | George Albert Bradshaw House | November 29, 1983 (#83003839) | 265 N. 200 West; 38°16′40″N 112°38′43″W | Beaver | |
| 18 | William Burt House | William Burt House | November 30, 1983 (#83003841) | 503 E. Center St. 38°16′28″N 112°37′56″W | Beaver | |
| 19 | Enoch E. Cowdell House | Enoch E. Cowdell House | September 17, 1982 (#82004081) | 595 N. 400 West; 38°16′55″N 112°38′55″W | Beaver | |
| 20 | Silas Cox House | Silas Cox House | November 29, 1983 (#83003844) | 85 S. 400 East; 38°16′24″N 112°38′02″W | Beaver | |
| 21 | Alma Crosby House | Alma Crosby House | April 15, 1983 (#83004396) | 115 E. 100 North; 38°16′33″N 112°38′21″W | Beaver | |
| 22 | Charles A. Dalten House | Charles A. Dalten House | September 17, 1982 (#82004082) | 270 S. 100 West; 38°16′14″N 112°38′36″W | Beaver | |
| 23 | James Heber Dean House | James Heber Dean House | September 17, 1982 (#82004083) | 390 W. 500 North; 38°16′52″N 112°38′53″W | Beaver | |
| 24 | Erickson House | Erickson House | September 17, 1982 (#82004084) | 290 N. 300 West; 38°16′41″N 112°38′46″W | Beaver | |
| 25 | Julia P.M. Farnsworth Barn | Julia P.M. Farnsworth Barn | September 17, 1982 (#82004085) | 180 W. Center St. (rear); 38°16′28″N 112°38′39″W | Beaver | |
| 26 | Julia Farnsworth House | Julia Farnsworth House | September 17, 1982 (#82004086) | 180 W. Center St. 38°16′28″N 112°38′39″W | Beaver | |
| 27 | Dr. George Fennemore House | Dr. George Fennemore House | February 1, 1980 (#80003885) | 90 S. 100 West; 38°16′23″N 112°38′36″W | Beaver | |
| 28 | James Fennemore House | James Fennemore House | April 15, 1983 (#83004397) | 195 N. 200 East; 38°16′36″N 112°38′18″W | Beaver | |
| 29 | Edward Fernley House | Edward Fernley House | November 29, 1983 (#83003846) | 215 E. 200 North; 38°16′38″N 112°38′15″W | Beaver | |
| 30 | William Fernley House | William Fernley House | November 30, 1983 (#83003848) | 1083 E. 200 North; 38°16′38″N 112°37′21″W | Beaver | |
| 31 | Fort Cameron | Fort Cameron | September 9, 1974 (#74001932) | East of Beaver on State Route 153; 38°16′42″N 112°36′08″W | Beaver vicinity | |
| 32 | Caroline Fotheringham House | Caroline Fotheringham House | September 17, 1982 (#82004087) | 290 N. 600 East; 38°16′41″N 112°37′51″W | Beaver | |
| 33 | William Fotheringham House | William Fotheringham House | April 15, 1983 (#83004403) | 190 W. 100 North; 38°16′33″N 112°38′40″W | Beaver | |
| 34 | David L. Frazer House | David L. Frazer House | November 30, 1983 (#83003850) | 817 E. 200 North; 38°16′39″N 112°37′38″W | Beaver | |
| 35 | Thomas Frazer House | Thomas Frazer House | November 16, 1978 (#78002650) | 590 N. 300 West; 38°16′56″N 112°38′47″W | Beaver | |
| 36 | Frisco Charcoal Kilns | Frisco Charcoal Kilns | March 9, 1982 (#82004793) | West of Milford off State Route 21; 38°27′39″N 113°15′46″W | Milford vicinity | |
| 37 | Henry C. Gale House (495 N. 1st East) | Henry C. Gale House (495 N. 1st East) | November 29, 1983 (#83003851) | 495 N. 100 East; 38°16′51″N 112°38′24″W | Beaver | Probably built by Alexander Boyter. |
| 38 | Henry C. Gale House (500 North) | Henry C. Gale House (500 North) | April 15, 1983 (#83004404) | 95 E. 500 North; 38°16′52″N 112°38′24″W | Beaver | |
| 39 | William Greenwood House | William Greenwood House | September 17, 1982 (#82004088) | 190 S. 100 West; 38°16′18″N 112°38′36″W | Beaver | |
| 40 | Duckworth Grimshaw House | Duckworth Grimshaw House | February 1, 1980 (#80003886) | 95 N. 400 West; 38°16′31″N 112°38′55″W | Beaver | |
| 41 | John Grimshaw House | John Grimshaw House | September 17, 1982 (#82004089) | 290 N. 200 East; 38°16′41″N 112°38′15″W | Beaver | |
| 42 | Louis W. Harris Flour Mill | Louis W. Harris Flour Mill | September 17, 1982 (#82004090) | 915 E. 200 North; 38°16′38″N 112°37′32″W | Beaver | |
| 43 | Louis W. Harris House | Louis W. Harris House | April 15, 1983 (#83004405) | 55 E. 200 North; 38°16′38″N 112°38′25″W | Beaver | |
| 44 | Sarah Eliza Harris House | Sarah Eliza Harris House | April 15, 1983 (#83004406) | 375 E. 200 North; 38°16′38″N 112°38′06″W | Beaver | |
| 45 | William and Eliza Hawkins House | William and Eliza Hawkins House | November 29, 1983 (#83003852) | 95 E. 200 North; 38°16′37″N 112°38′23″W | Beaver | |
| 46 | House at 110 S. 3rd West | House at 110 S. 3rd West | November 30, 1983 (#83003861) | 110 S. 300 West; 38°16′21″N 112°38′49″W | Beaver | |
| 47 | House at 325 S. Main St. | House at 325 S. Main St. | November 30, 1983 (#83003862) | 325 S. Riverside Ln. 38°16′10″N 112°38′26″W | Beaver | |
| 48 | Joseph Huntington House | Joseph Huntington House | April 15, 1983 (#83004407) | 215 S. 200 West; 38°16′17″N 112°38′39″W | Beaver | |
| 49 | Samuel Jackson House | Samuel Jackson House | November 30, 1983 (#83003863) | 225 S. 200 East; 38°16′16″N 112°38′15″W | Beaver | |
| 50 | Jenner-Griffiths House | Jenner-Griffiths House | May 16, 1985 (#85001118) | 10 N. 300 East; 38°12′57″N 112°55′02″W | Minersville | |
| 51 | Thomas Jones House | Thomas Jones House | September 17, 1982 (#82004091) | 635 N. 400 West; 38°16′58″N 112°38′56″W | Beaver | |
| 52 | John Ruphard Lee House | John Ruphard Lee House | September 17, 1982 (#82004092) | 195 N. 100 West; 38°16′36″N 112°38′36″W | Beaver | |
| 53 | Lester Limb House | Lester Limb House | September 17, 1982 (#82004093) | 495 N. 400 West; 38°16′50″N 112°38′55″W | Beaver | |
| 54 | Low Hotel | Low Hotel | November 29, 1983 (#83003865) | 95 N. Main St. 38°16′31″N 112°38′30″W | Beaver | |
| 55 | Reinhard Maeser House | Reinhard Maeser House | November 29, 1983 (#83003871) | 285 E. 200 North; 38°16′38″N 112°38′12″W | Beaver | |
| 56 | Mansfield, Murdock and Co. Store | Mansfield, Murdock and Co. Store | November 29, 1983 (#83003868) | 1–11 N. Main St. 38°16′28″N 112°38′30″W | Beaver | |
| 57 | Mathew McEvan House | Mathew McEvan House | April 15, 1983 (#83004408) | 205 N. 100 West; 38°16′37″N 112°38′36″W | Beaver | |
| 58 | Meeting Hall | Meeting Hall | September 17, 1982 (#82004094) | 1st North and 300 East; 38°16′34″N 112°38′11″W | Beaver | |
| 59 | Minersville City Hall | Minersville City Hall | April 1, 1985 (#85000795) | 60 W. Main St. 38°12′57″N 112°55′27″W | Minersville | |
| 60 | William Morgan House | William Morgan House | April 15, 1983 (#83004409) | 110 W. 600 North; 38°16′57″N 112°38′36″W | Beaver | |
| 61 | Andrew James Morris House | Andrew James Morris House | September 17, 1982 (#82004095) | 445 E. 100 North; 38°16′33″N 112°38′02″W | Beaver | |
| 62 | William Moyes Jr. House | William Moyes Jr. House | November 29, 1983 (#83003873) | 395 N. 100 West; 38°16′46″N 112°38′36″W | Beaver | Brick house built c.1905 having great historic integrity (as of 1979) |
| 63 | Mud Spring | | June 4, 1985 (#85001231) | Address Restricted | Garrison vicinity | |
| 64 | David Muir House | David Muir House | November 25, 1980 (#80003887) | 295 N. 300 West; 38°16′40″N 112°38′49″W | Beaver | |
| 65 | Almira Lott Murdock House | Almira Lott Murdock House | November 29, 1983 (#83003878) | 85 W. 100 North; 38°16′31″N 112°38′33″W | Beaver | |
| 66 | John Riggs and Mary Ellen Wolfenden Murdock House | John Riggs and Mary Ellen Wolfenden Murdock House | November 29, 1983 (#83003884) | 90 W. 100 North; 38°16′33″N 112°38′34″W | Beaver | |
| 67 | Wilson G. Nowers House | Wilson G. Nowers House | November 29, 1983 (#83003876) | 195 E. 100 North; 38°16′33″N 112°38′18″W | Beaver | |
| 68 | Odd Fellows Hall | Odd Fellows Hall | November 29, 1983 (#83003885) | 33-35 N. Main St. 38°16′28″N 112°38′30″W | Beaver | |
| 69 | Frances A. Olcott House | Frances A. Olcott House | November 30, 1983 (#83003886) | 590 E. 100 North; 38°16′31″N 112°37′52″W | Beaver | |
| 70 | Jessie Orwin House | Jessie Orwin House | November 29, 1983 (#83003888) | 390 W. 600 North; 38°16′57″N 112°38′57″W | Beaver | |
| 71 | David Powell House | David Powell House | April 15, 1983 (#83004410) | 115 N. 400 West; 38°16′33″N 112°38′55″W | Beaver | |
| 72 | Ephraim Orvel Puffer House | Ephraim Orvel Puffer House | November 29, 1983 (#83003889) | 195 S. 200 East; 38°16′18″N 112°38′15″W | Beaver | |
| 73 | Sylvester H. Reeves House | Sylvester H. Reeves House | November 29, 1983 (#83003890) | 90 N. 200 West; 38°16′27″N 112°38′39″W | Beaver | |
| 74 | James E. Robinson House | James E. Robinson House | September 17, 1982 (#82004096) | 415 E. 400 North; 38°16′48″N 112°38′03″W | Beaver | |
| 75 | William Robinson House (State Route 153) | William Robinson House (State Route 153) | November 30, 1983 (#83003891) | East of Beaver on State Route 153; 38°16′37″N 112°36′40″W | Beaver | |
| 76 | William Robinson House (300 West) | William Robinson House (300 West) | April 15, 1983 (#83004411) | 95 N. 300 West; 38°16′30″N 112°38′49″W | Beaver | |
| 77 | Rollins-Eyre House | Rollins-Eyre House | January 30, 1995 (#94001626) | 113 W. Main St. 38°12′47″N 112°55′41″W | Minersville | |
| 78 | Ryan Ranch (42 BE 618) | | June 4, 1985 (#85001232) | Address Restricted | Beaver vicinity | |
| 79 | School House | School House | November 29, 1983 (#83003892) | 325 N. 200 West; 38°16′43″N 112°38′43″W | Beaver | |
| 80 | Dr. Warren Shepherd House | Dr. Warren Shepherd House | April 15, 1983 (#83004412) | 60 W. 100 North; 38°16′33″N 112°38′32″W | Beaver | |
| 81 | Harriet S. Shepherd House | Harriet S. Shepherd House | February 8, 1980 (#80003888) | 190 N. 200 East; 38°16′36″N 112°38′15″W | Beaver | |
| 82 | Horace A. Skinner House | Horace A. Skinner House | November 29, 1983 (#83003894) | 185 S. Main St. 38°16′18″N 112°38′29″W | Beaver | |
| 83 | Ellen Smith House | Ellen Smith House | November 29, 1983 (#83003896) | 395 N. 300 West; 38°16′45″N 112°38′49″W | Beaver | |
| 84 | Seth W. Smith House | Seth W. Smith House | September 17, 1982 (#82004097) | 190 N. 600 East; 38°16′36″N 112°37′50″W | Beaver | |
| 85 | William P. Smith House | William P. Smith House | November 29, 1983 (#83003898) | 190 E. Center St. 38°16′26″N 112°38′17″W | Beaver | |
| 86 | Mitchell M. Stephens House | Mitchell M. Stephens House | November 29, 1983 (#83003899) | 495 N. 200 East; 38°16′51″N 112°38′18″W | Beaver | |
| 87 | Robert W. Stoney House | Robert W. Stoney House | November 30, 1983 (#83003900) | 305 W. 300 North; 38°16′42″N 112°38′49″W | Beaver | |
| 88 | Robert Stoney House | Robert Stoney House | September 17, 1982 (#82004098) | 295 N. 400 West; 38°16′41″N 112°38′55″W | Beaver | |
| 89 | Structure at 490 E. 200 North | Structure at 490 E. 200 North | September 17, 1982 (#82004099) | 490 E. 200 North; 38°16′36″N 112°37′59″W | Beaver | |
| 90 | Henry M. Tanner House | Henry M. Tanner House | April 15, 1983 (#83004413) | 400 North and 300 East; 38°16′46″N 112°38′09″W | Beaver | |
| 91 | Jake Tanner House | Jake Tanner House | November 30, 1983 (#83003901) | 580 S. 200 West; 38°15′57″N 112°38′42″W | Beaver | |
| 92 | Sidney Tanner House | Sidney Tanner House | April 15, 1983 (#83004414) | 195 E. 200 North; 38°16′38″N 112°38′18″W | Beaver | |
| 93 | Joseph Tattersall House | Joseph Tattersall House | September 17, 1982 (#82004100) | 195 N. 400 West; 38°16′35″N 112°38′55″W | Beaver | |
| 94 | Mary I. Thompson House | Mary I. Thompson House | November 30, 1983 (#83003902) | 25 N. 400 East; 38°16′28″N 112°38′02″W | Beaver | |
| 95 | W.O. Thompson House | W.O. Thompson House | September 17, 1982 (#82004101) | 415 N. 400 West; 38°16′47″N 112°38′55″W | Beaver | |
| 96 | William Thompson House | William Thompson House | September 17, 1982 (#82004102) | 160 E. Center St. 38°16′26″N 112°38′19″W | Beaver | |
| 97 | William Thompson, Jr. House | William Thompson, Jr. House | September 17, 1982 (#82004103) | 10 W. 400 North; 38°16′47″N 112°38′30″W | Beaver | |
| 98 | Edward Tolton House | Edward Tolton House | September 17, 1982 (#82004104) | 210 W. 400 North; 38°16′47″N 112°38′43″W | Beaver | |
| 99 | J.F. Tolton Grocery | J.F. Tolton Grocery | November 29, 1983 (#83003905) | 25 N. Main St. 38°16′28″N 112°38′30″W | Beaver | |
| 100 | Walter S. Tolton House | Walter S. Tolton House | November 29, 1983 (#83003910) | 195 W. 500 North; 38°16′51″N 112°38′40″W | Beaver | |
| 101 | Ancil Twitchell House | Ancil Twitchell House | February 23, 1984 (#84002146) | 100 S. 200 East; 38°16′21″N 112°38′17″W | Beaver | |
| 102 | Daniel Tyler House | Daniel Tyler House | November 29, 1983 (#83003943) | 310 N. Main St. 38°16′42″N 112°38′28″W | Beaver | |
| 103 | Upper Beaver Hydroelectric Power Plant Historic District | Upper Beaver Hydroelectric Power Plant Historic District | April 20, 1989 (#89000282) | State Route 153 10 miles (16 km) east of Beaver; 38°16′02″N 112°29′00″W | Beaver | |
| 104 | US Post Office-Beaver Main | US Post Office-Beaver Main | November 27, 1989 (#89001992) | 20 S. Main St. 38°16′26″N 112°38′30″W | Beaver | |
| 105 | Charles Dennis White House | Charles Dennis White House | February 14, 1980 (#80003889) | 115 E. 400 North; 38°16′48″N 112°38′21″W | Beaver | |
| 106 | Maggie Gillies White House | Maggie Gillies White House | February 23, 1984 (#84002149) | 1591 E. 200 North; 38°16′38″N 112°36′42″W | Beaver | |
| 107 | Samuel White House | Samuel White House | November 29, 1983 (#83003944) | 315 N. 100 East; 38°16′43″N 112°38′23″W | Beaver | |
| 108 | William H. White House | William H. White House | February 23, 1984 (#84002153) | 510 N. 100 East; 38°16′52″N 112°38′21″W | Beaver | |
| 109 | Wildhorse Canyon Obsidian Quarry | | May 13, 1976 (#76001810) | Address Restricted | Milford vicinity | An archaeological site, the only known obsidian flow in Utah used by prehistoric peoples as a source of raw materials. |
| 110 | Charles Willden House | Charles Willden House | November 30, 1983 (#83003945) | 190 E. 300 South (rear); 38°16′47″N 112°38′43″W | Beaver | |
| 111 | Elliot Willden House | Elliot Willden House | November 30, 1983 (#83003946) | 340 S. Riverside Ln. 38°16′07″N 112°38′29″W | Beaver | |
| 112 | Feargus O'Connor Willden House | Feargus O'Connor Willden House | November 29, 1983 (#83003947) | 120 E. 100 South; 38°16′21″N 112°38′21″W | Beaver | |
| 113 | John Willden House | John Willden House | September 17, 1982 (#82004105) | 495 N. 200 West; 38°16′50″N 112°38′43″W | Beaver | |
| 114 | John Yardley House | John Yardley House | November 29, 1983 (#83003948) | 210 S. 100 West; 38°16′16″N 112°38′36″W | Beaver | |

== Former listings ==
| | Name on the Register | Image | Date listed | Date removed | Location | City or town | Description |
|---|---|---|---|---|---|---|---|
| 1 | Beaver High School | | September 17, 1982 (#82004077) | May 15, 2001 | 150 N. Main St. | Beaver | Demolished on April 29, 1997. |
| 2 | John Riggs and Mae Bain Murdock House | | November 29, 1983 (#83003883) | August 13, 1990 | 94 W. Center St. | Beaver | |
| 3 | James Whitaker House | | April 15, 1983 (#83004415) | August 13, 1990 | 395 N. 300 East | Beaver | |

== See also ==
- List of National Historic Landmarks in Utah
- National Register of Historic Places listings in Utah
