= Willden =

Willden is a surname. Notable people with the name include:

- Charles William Willden and his son Ellott, constructors of Willden Fort, Cove Creek, Utah in 1860
- Gordon Willden (1929–2019), a Canadian politician

== See also ==
- Elliot Willden House, Beaver, Utah, U.S.
- Feargus O'Connor Willden House, Beaver, Utah, U.S.
- John Willden House, Beaver, Utah, U.S.
