= Atkins House =

Atkins House may refer to:

- Atkins-Carter House, Louisa, Kentucky, listed on the National Register of Historic Places (NRHP) in Lawrence County
- Atkins-Johnson Farmhouse Property, Gladstone, Missouri, NRHP-listed
- Gridley-Howe-Faden-Atkins Farmstead, Kimball, Nebraska, NRHP-listed
- S. G. Atkins House, Winston-Salem, North Carolina, NRHP-listed
- Atkins and Smith House, Beaver, Utah, NRHP-listed in Beaver County
