= John Ashworth House =

John Ashworth House may refer to:

- John Ashworth House (100 West, Beaver, Utah), listed on the National Register of Historic Places (NRHP)
- John Ashworth House (200 West, Beaver, Utah), listed on the NRHP
