= John Ashworth House (200 West, Beaver, Utah) =

Historic house in Beaver, Utah, United States

- U.S. National Register of Historic Places
- John Ashworth House, 1981
- Location: 115 South 200 West (Note: The National Register of Historic Places Inventory/Nomination mistakenly lists the address as "155 S. 200 West", but the caption for the accompanying photos correctly indicates the house number as "115".); Beaver, Utah; United States
- Coordinates: 38°16′19″N 112°38′36″W
- Area: less than one acre
- Built: 1875
- Architectural style: Cottage
- MPS: Beaver MRA
- NRHP reference No.: 83003828
- Added to NRHP: November 29, 1983

The John Ashworth House a historic residence in Beaver, Utah, United States, that is listed on the National Register of Historic Places (NRHP).

== Description ==
The house is located at 115 South 200 West and was built in 1875. The house was built by John Ashworth, then mayor of Beaver, probably for William Ashworth, one of his sons. It was deemed

significant because it is an interesting combination of two of the most popular house types in Beaver during the 1875-1890 period, namely, the Hall & Parlor (north section) and the Cross-wing (south section) types. This marriage of house designs produces an interesting effect, for while the house is perfectly consistent with house planning principles found during this period of Beaver's history, it also becomes at once a house which is both common (the Hall & Parlor house with rear extension) and rare (the double cross-wing or H-plan). For a further discussion of the double cross-wing house in Utah, see the nomination form for the Charles E. Davies house, Provo, Utah (National Register listing January 1983).

John Ashworth lived in the large house to the east on the same block (the John Ashworth House, also NRHP-listed).

The structure was listed on the NRHP November 29, 1983. The listing include four contributing buildings.

== See also ==
- National Register of Historic Places listings in Beaver County, Utah
