= Cowdell =

Cowdell is a surname. Notable people with the surname include:

- John Cowdell (born 1953), Australian politician
- Patrick Cowdell (born 1953), British boxer

== See also ==
- Enoch E. Cowdell House, in Beaver, Utah
