= David L. Frazer House =

- U.S. National Register of Historic Places
- Location within Utah Location within the United States
- Location: 817 E. 200 North, Beaver, Utah
- Coordinates: 38°16′37″N 112°37′35″W
- Area: less than one acre
- Built: 1880
- Built by: Frazer, Thomas & David Ingles
- MPS: Beaver MRA
- NRHP reference No.: 83003850
- Added to NRHP: November 30, 1983

The David L. Frazer House, at 817 E. 200 North in Beaver, Utah, was built in 1880. It was listed on the National Register of Historic Places in 1983.

It was built in several stages, starting in 1880, by Thomas Frazer, a stonemason born in Scotland, and his son David Ingles Frazer, born in Utah.

A couple ends of what would be gables are cut off by jerkinheads.

== See also ==
- Thomas Frazer House, also NRHP-listed in Beaver
