= Edward Fernley House =

- U.S. National Register of Historic Places
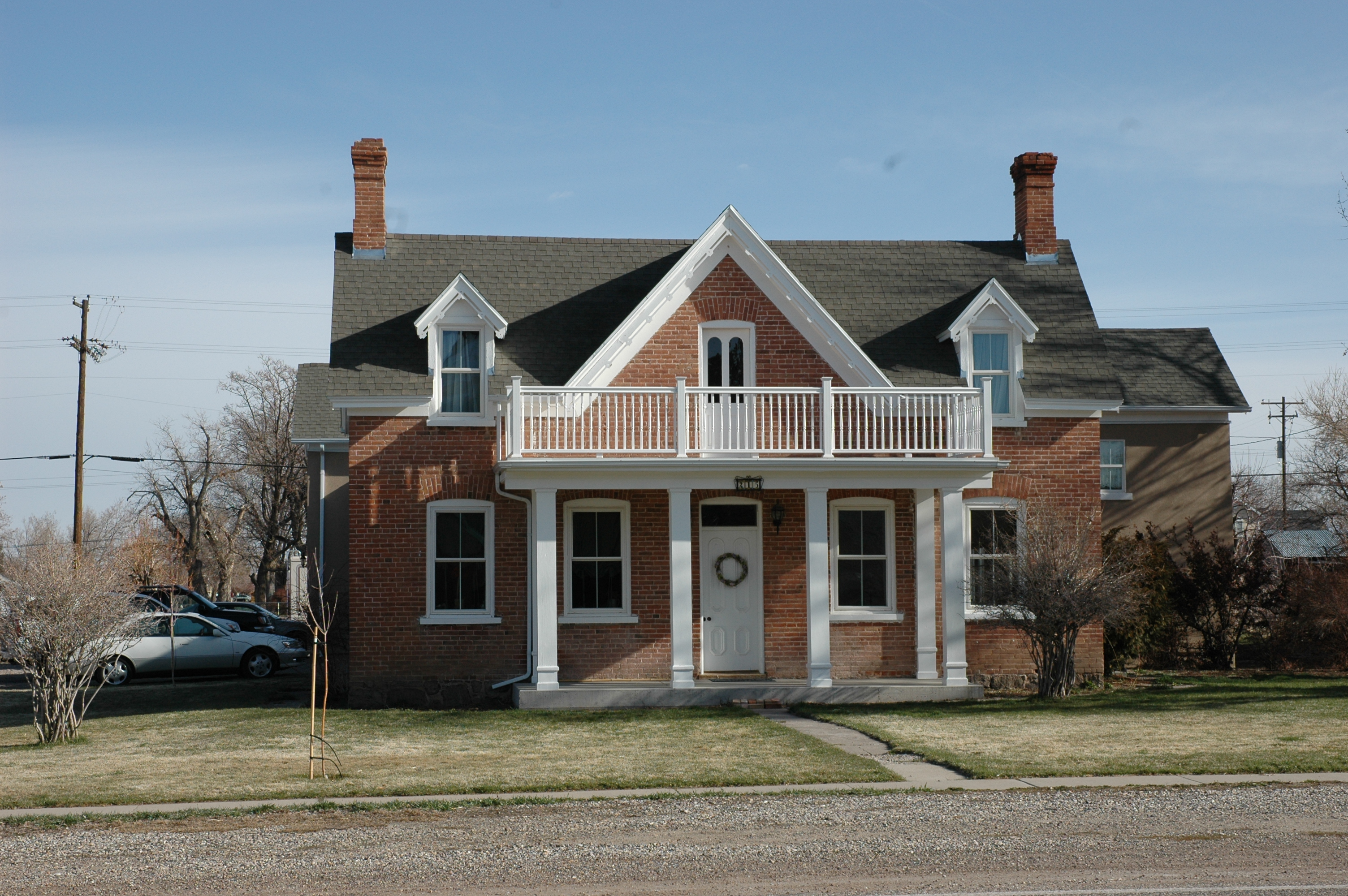

- Location within Utah
- Location: 215 E. 200 North, Beaver, Utah
- Coordinates: 38°16′38″N 112°38′11″W
- Area: less than one acre
- Built: c.1885
- Architectural style: Gothic Revival, Central-passage house
- MPS: Beaver MRA
- NRHP reference No.: 83003846
- Added to NRHP: November 29, 1983

The Edward Fernley House, at 215 E. 200 North in Beaver, Utah was listed on the National Register of Historic Places in 1983.

It is a one-and-a-half-story brick house with some element of Gothic Revival styling, built around 1885. A one-story rear extension dates from around 1890.

It was deemed "architecturally significant for several reasons. First, it remains a well preserved example w of upper-middle class domestic architecture from Beaver's principal years of x growth, c. 1875–1900. Second, its central passageway plan documents one of several important dwelling types found in 19th century Utah. Finally, the large central cross gable with flanking wall dormers house design is unique to the Beaver-Iron County area of Utah, a design which perhaps can be traced to the work of the Beaver builder-architect, Thomas Frazer.
