= William Barton House =

- U.S. National Register of Historic Places
- Location within Utah Location within the United States
- Location: 295 N. 300 East, Beaver, Utah
- Coordinates: 38°16′38″N 112°38′11″W
- Area: less than one acre
- Built: 1876, c.1900
- MPS: Beaver MRA
- NRHP reference No.: 82004076
- Added to NRHP: September 17, 1982

The William Barton House, at 295 N. 300 East in Beaver, Utah, is a historic house built in 1876. It was listed on the National Register of Historic Places in 1982.

It was built as a log house in 1876 and expanded in about 1900. The log portion with its notching is visible on the west side of the house. The house is upon a rubble rock foundation.
