= William Greenwood House =

- U.S. National Register of Historic Places
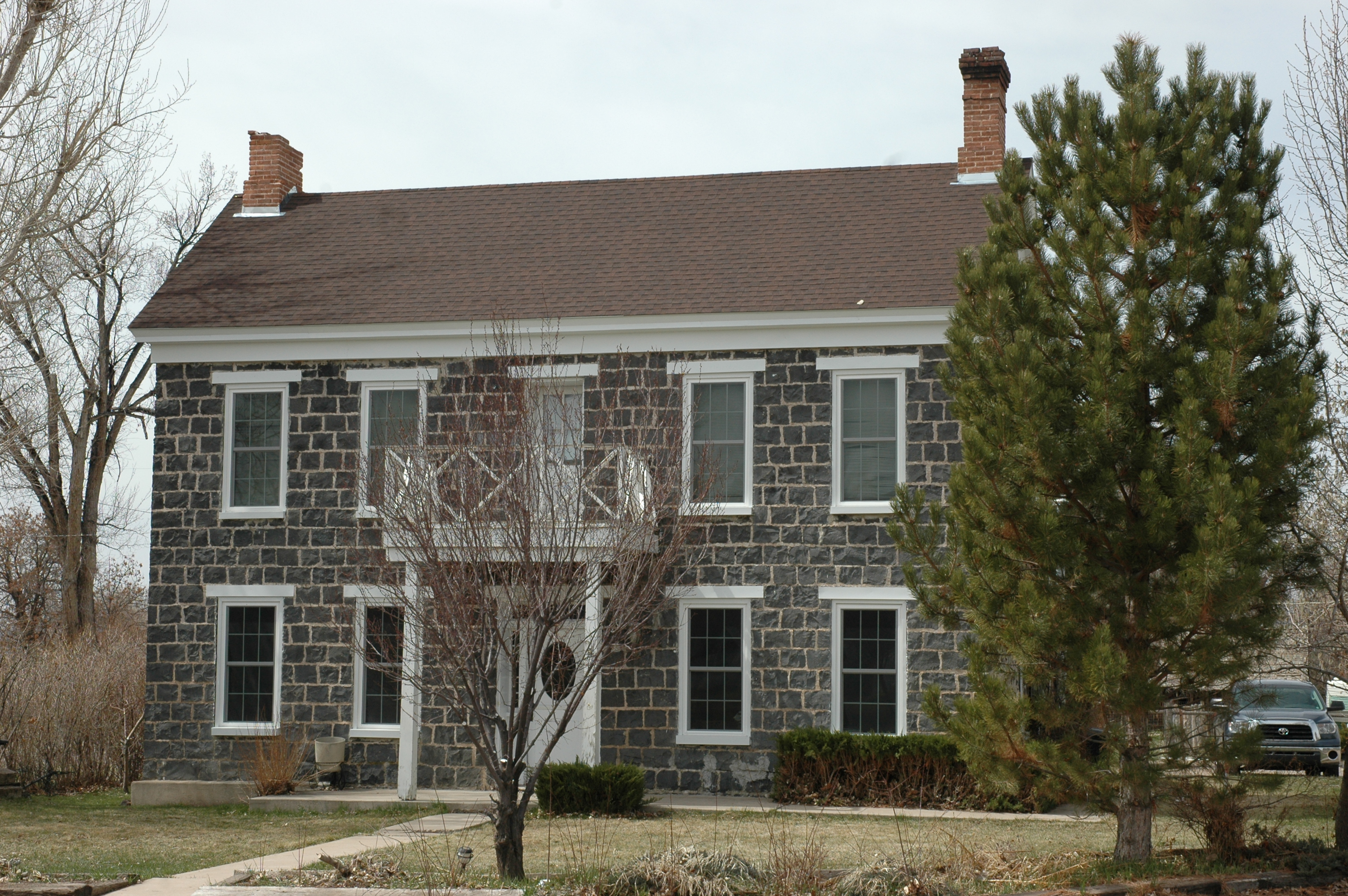

- Location within Utah Location within the United States
- Location: 190 S. 1st West, Beaver, Utah
- Coordinates: 38°16′19″N 112°38′36″W
- Area: less than one acre
- Built: 1878
- MPS: Beaver MRA
- NRHP reference No.: 82004088
- Added to NRHP: September 17, 1982

The William Greenwood House, at 190 S. 1st West in Beaver, Utah, was built in 1878. It was listed on the National Register of Historic Places in 1982.

It is two stories high, which is unusual for a black rock (basalt) building in Beaver. However it was originally constructed as a lean-to.

It was built for, and possibly by, William Greenwood, who was born in Hopinstal, England. It is similar to other buildings by stonemason Thomas Frazer but is probably not a work of his.
