= James Heber Dean House =

- U.S. National Register of Historic Places
- Location within Utah Location within the United States
- Location: 390 W. 500 North, Beaver, Utah
- Coordinates: 38°16′54″N 112°38′49″W
- Area: less than one acre
- Built: 1911
- Built by: Pierson, Bill; Frazer, Jack
- MPS: Beaver MRA
- NRHP reference No.: 82004083
- Added to NRHP: September 17, 1982

The James Heber Dean House, at 390 W. 500 North in Beaver, Utah, was built in 1911. It was listed on the National Register of Historic Places in 1982.

It is described positively, in 1979, by L.L. Bonar in its Utah State Historical Society review:

This home was built in 1911 and its style was definitely influenced by high style architecture rather than the local vernacular. It has a cruciform plan with the front facade in one of the long ends of the cross. All four ends have a gable and each is decorated with a full return cornice and fancy shinglework. On the front facade, the corners of the building have been bevelled, a trait common in some of the Victorian styles of architecture but quite rare in Beaver. At the top of each of these bevelled corners are decorative wooden elements that complete the cut-off corner. This woodwork is the most decorative of any found on the house and it is quite well done. Also for decorative effect are the voussoir/pendant motifs above the windows and doors done in brick. The home is well maintained and the grounds are lovely.

The house's brickwork was done by mason Bill Pierson; stone foundation was laid by Jack Frazer.
