= George Albert Bradshaw House =

Historic house in Utah, United States

- U.S. National Register of Historic Places
- Location within Utah Location within the United States
- Location: 265 N. 200 West, Beaver, Utah
- Coordinates: 38°16′38″N 112°38′42″W
- Area: less than one acre
- Built: 1885
- Architectural style: log cabin
- MPS: Beaver MRA
- NRHP reference No.: 83003839
- Added to NRHP: November 29, 1983

The George Albert Bradshaw House, at 265 N. 200 West in Beaver, Utah, was built in 1885. It was listed on the National Register of Historic Places in 1983.

It was built by Yorkshire, England-born George Albert Irving Bradshaw. It was deemed significant as a rare log house surviving in Beaver, and being in "excellent condition", and "having board-and-batten siding in the gables" and having more symmetry than most earlier cabins.
