= William Burt House (Beaver, Utah) =

Historic house in Utah, United States

- U.S. National Register of Historic Places
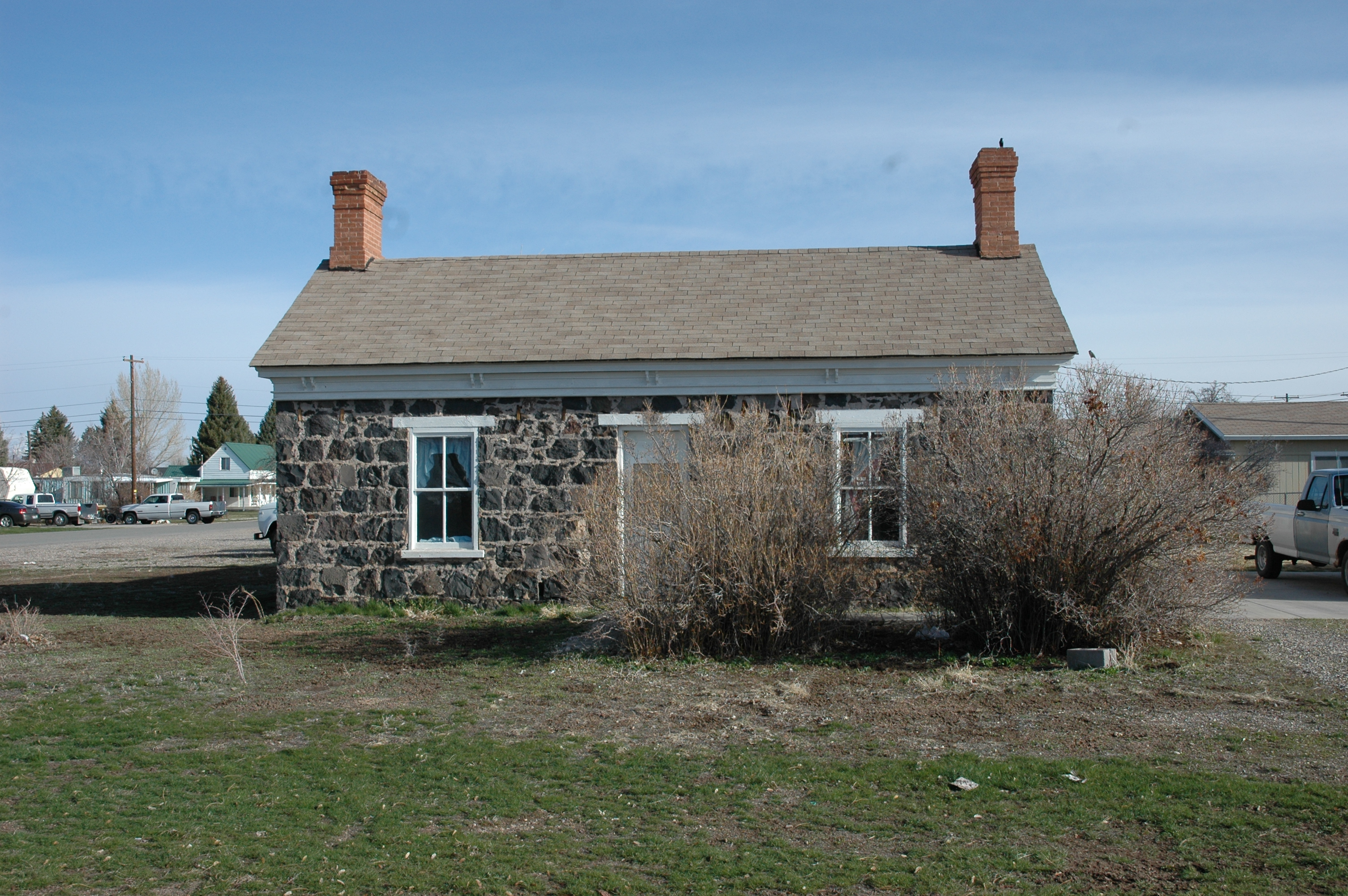
- South facade

- Location within Utah Location within the United States
- Location: 503 E. Center St., Beaver, Utah
- Coordinates: 38°16′29″N 112°37′50″W
- Area: less than one acre
- Built: 1875
- Architect: Burt, William
- Architectural style: Vernacular Hall & Parlor
- MPS: Beaver MRA
- NRHP reference No.: 83003841
- Added to NRHP: November 30, 1983

The William Burt House in Beaver, Utah was built in 1875. It was listed on the National Register of Historic Places in 1983.

Its original portion is a black rock (basalt) hall and parlor house.
