= Silas Cox House =

- U.S. National Register of Historic Places
- Location within Utah Location within the United States
- Location: 1st South and 4th East, Beaver, Utah
- Coordinates: 38°16′19″N 112°38′03″W
- Area: less than one acre
- Built: c.1901
- Built by: Cox, Silas
- Architectural style: Late Victorian, T/L Cottage
- MPS: Beaver MRA
- NRHP reference No.: 83003844
- Added to NRHP: November 29, 1983

The Silas Cox House, at 85 S. 400 East in Beaver, Utah, is a historic house built around 1901. It was listed on the National Register of Historic Places in 1983.

It is a one-and-a-half-story brick L-shaped house with an unusual entrance inset at the joint of the L.

It was built by Silas Cox, who bought the property in 1892, and who made and burned all the brick for the home.
