= William and Eliza Hawkins House =

- U.S. National Register of Historic Places
- Location within Utah Location within the United States
- Location: 95 E. 200 North, Beaver, Utah
- Coordinates: 38°16′38″N 112°38′23″W
- Area: less than one acre
- Built: 1880
- Architectural style: Hall & Parlor Vernacular
- MPS: Beaver MRA
- NRHP reference No.: 83003852
- Added to NRHP: November 29, 1983

The William and Eliza Hawkins House, at 95 E. 200 North in Beaver, Utah, United States, was built in 1880. It was listed on the National Register of Historic Places in 1983.

It was built as a vernacular hall and parlor cottage. The Hawkins added a brick lean-to addition in 1885; this portion was rebuilt in the 1970s.

The property includes a granary which was once used as an assay office for miners; this was deemed non-contributing however.
