= John Yardley House =

- U.S. National Register of Historic Places
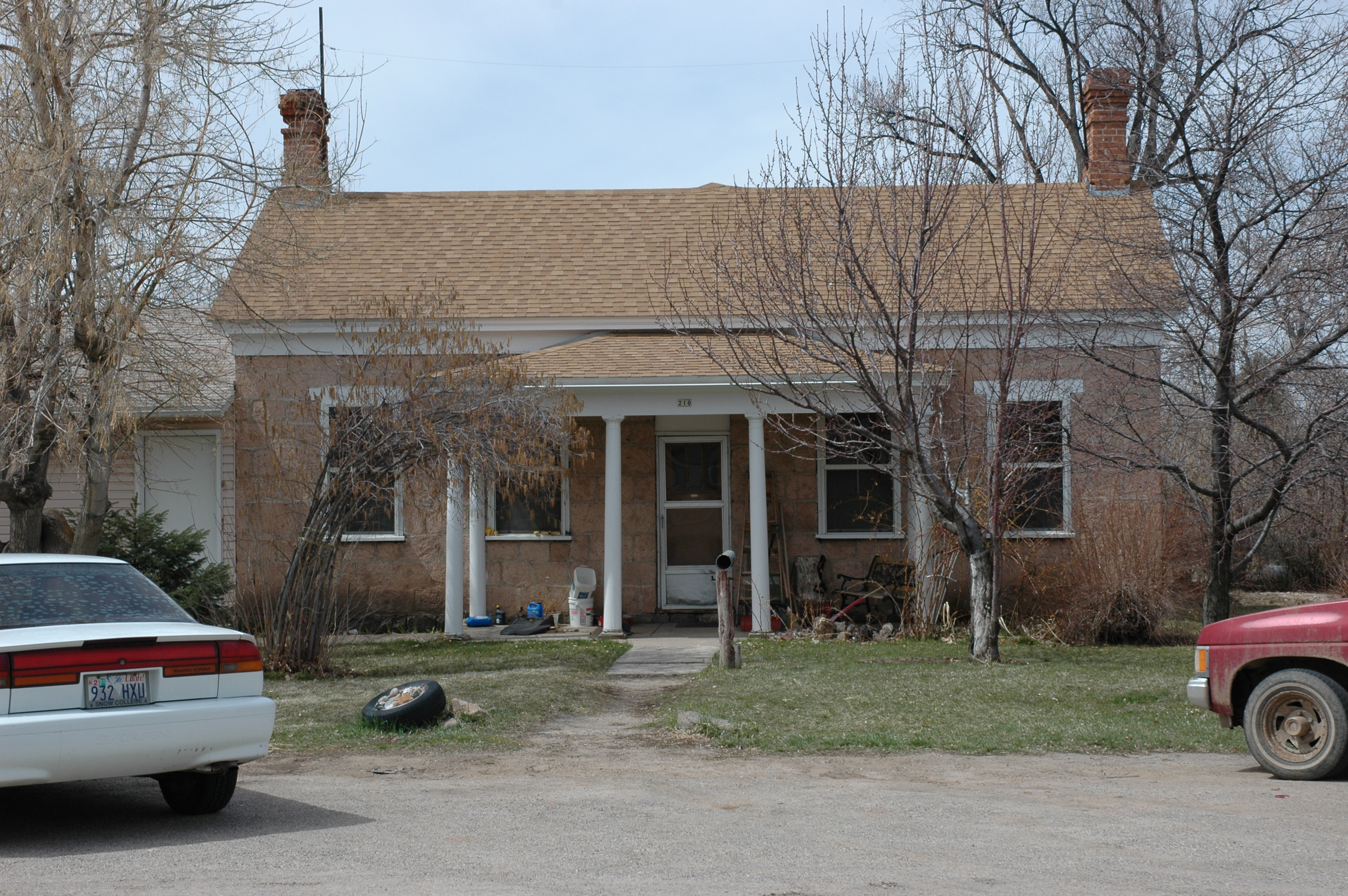

- Location within Utah Location within the United States
- Location: 210 S. 1st West, Beaver, Utah
- Coordinates: 38°16′14″N 112°38′36″W
- Area: less than one acre
- Built: c. 1880
- Architectural style: Hall & Parlor; Classical
- MPS: Beaver MRA
- NRHP reference No.: 83003948
- Added to NRHP: November 29, 1983

The John Yardley House, at 210 S. 1st West in Beaver, Utah, was built around 1880. It was listed on the National Register of Historic Places in 1983.

It is a one-story hall and parlor plan stone house with gable-end chimneys, built of tuff (pink rock). It has a rear ell which is part of the original, and a hipped roof porch which was added c.1890-1900. It is overall Classical in style, with a symmetric five-opening front facade, a plain entablature and stylized Tuscan columns.
