= William Moyes Jr. House =

- U.S. National Register of Historic Places
- Location within Utah Location within the United States
- Location: 395 N. 100 West, Beaver, Utah
- Coordinates: 38°16′43″N 112°38′36″W
- Area: less than one acre
- Built: c.1905
- Architectural style: Hall & Parlor Vernacular
- MPS: Beaver MRA
- NRHP reference No.: 83003873
- Added to NRHP: November 29, 1983

The William Moyes Jr. House, at 395 N. 100 West in Beaver, Utah, was built around 1905. It was listed on the National Register of Historic Places in 1983.

It is a brick house with vernacular architecture, and was built originally with a hall and parlor plan. A rear T-shaped extension was added during 1910–20. Its front facade has symmetry: two windows, the front door, and two windows, with decorative brick arches above each. It has decorative shingles in the gable ends and a cornice with a full return.

It was deemed "significant because of its historic date and its unimpaired historic integrity. Its design is interesting because it is representative of a style of architecture that provided a transition between traditional vernacular styles and the more universal styles of architecture that became popular in the 20th Century. The shingled gables, the complete return cornice, the Jerkin head, etc. are all examples of characteristics common to this more progressive style of architecture. The hall andparlor plan with the bilateral symmetry of the front facade harken back to the more traditional styles."
