= Charles A. Dalten House =

Historic house in Beaver, Utah, US

- U.S. National Register of Historic Places
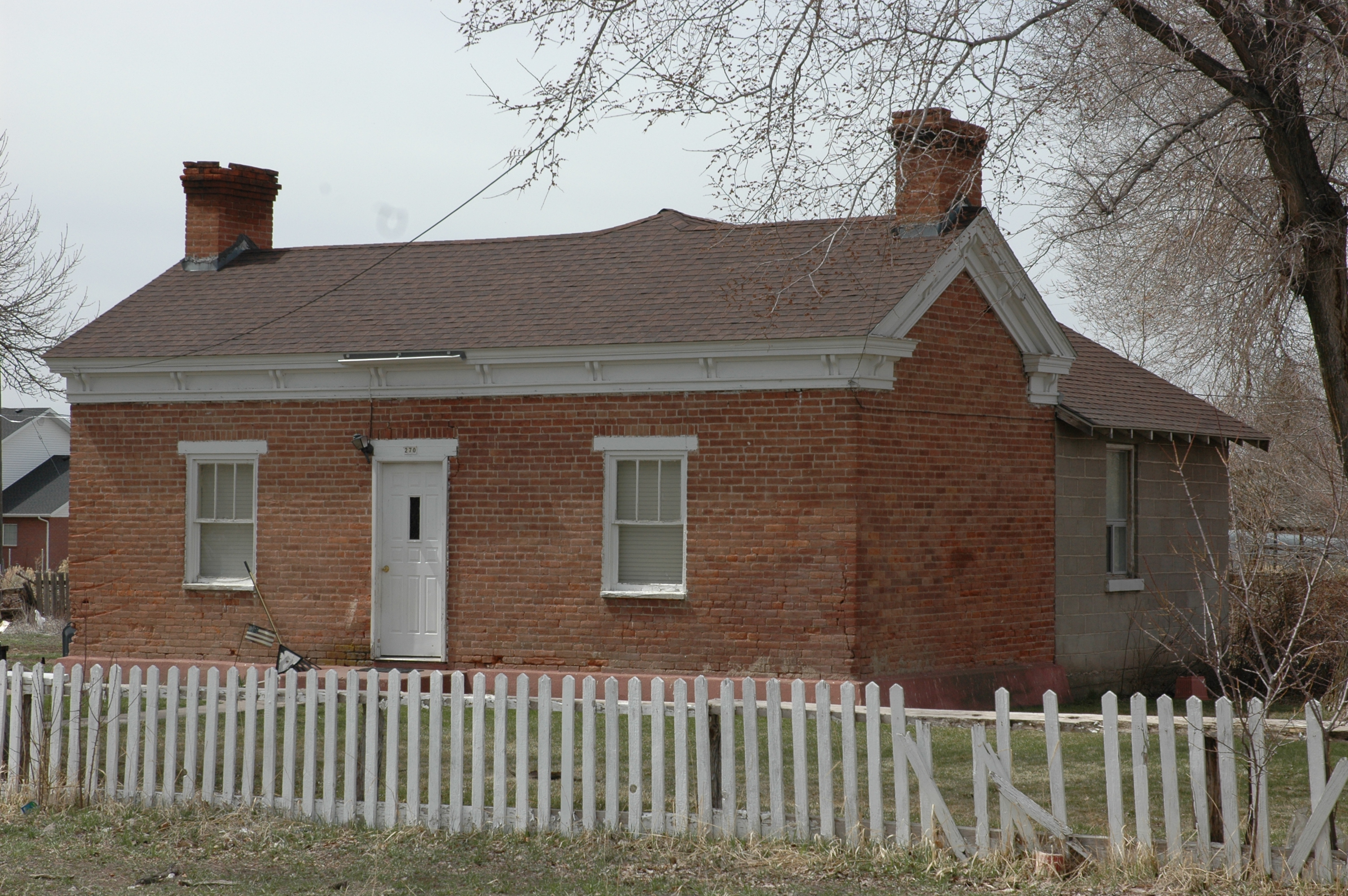

- Location within Utah Location within the United States
- Location: 270 S. 1st West, Beaver, Utah
- Coordinates: 38°16′14″N 112°38′36″W
- Area: less than one acre
- Built: 1868
- MPS: Beaver MRA
- NRHP reference No.: 82004082
- Added to NRHP: September 17, 1982

The Charles A. Dalten House, at 270 S. 1st West in Beaver, Utah, was built in 1868. It was listed on the National Register of Historic Places in 1982.

It is notable as "A very early brick residence in Beaver, of which there were several built in Plat A during the late 1860s and 1870s. These homes were all very similar and they may have been built by the same contractor/builder. Andrew Patterson supplied the burned brick and perhaps the lime for this house as he did for several other early homes in Beaver. Though most of these similar brick homes have been altered today, at one time they all displayed two to four windows across the front facade, symmetrically placed on either side of a central door. All these houses were one story tall, with end-wall chimneys and they were finished with a Greek Revival style cornice with paired brackets. In May of 1868, Elder George A. Smith reported: '...much improvement is going on at this place; several new burnt-brick houses are going up." ("Manuscript History of the Church,' L.D.S, Church Office Library, Salt Lake City, Utah), and it is likely that these similar houses were the ones Elder Smith was speaking of."
