= Beaver City Library =

Historic library building in Utah, United States

- U.S. National Register of Historic Places
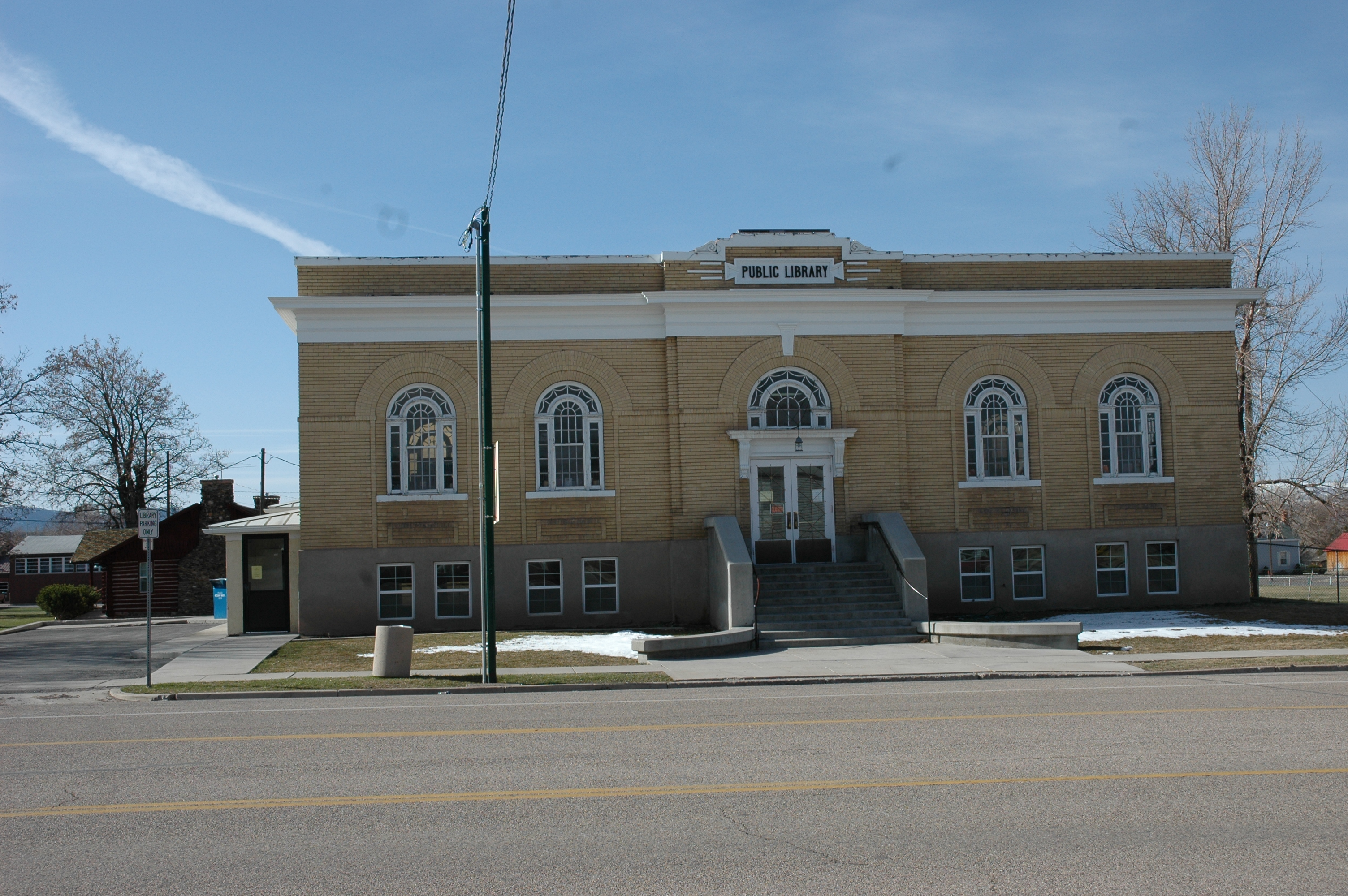

- Location within Utah Location within the United States
- Location: 50 W. Center St., Beaver, Utah
- Coordinates: 38°16′24″N 112°38′29″W
- Area: less than one acre
- Built: c.1917
- Architectural style: Federalist Revival
- MPS: Beaver MRA
- NRHP reference No.: 83004391
- Added to NRHP: April 15, 1983

The Beaver City Library in Beaver, Utah was built around 1917. It was listed on the National Register of Historic Places in 1983.

It is a brick Carnegie library.

It was deemed significant in 1979 as "an excellent example of the Federalist Revival Style and is the only building designed so clearly in this style in Beaver. The building is one of a series of small town libraries built to enhance the cultural and educational life of rural areas by the Carnegie family. That it has remained totally unaltered until 1979 is a tribute to its excellent design and workmanship."
