= Alma Crosby House =

- U.S. National Register of Historic Places
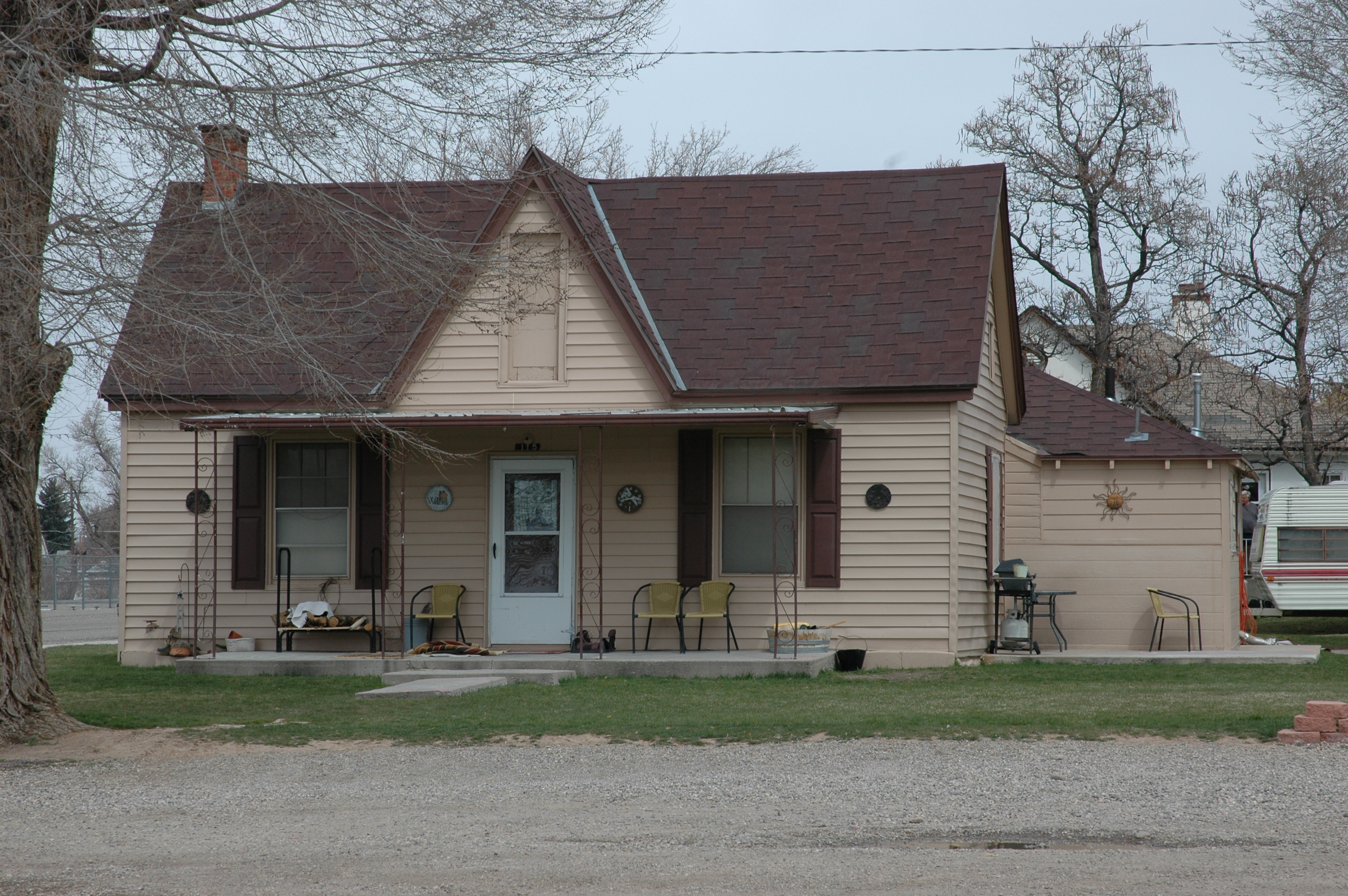

- Location within Utah Location within the United States
- Location: 115 E. 1st North, Beaver, Utah
- Coordinates: 38°16′34″N 112°38′17″W 115 E. 100 North 38°16′34″N 112°38′17″W
- Area: less than one acre
- Built: 1867
- Built by: Crosby, Johathan; Crosby, Alma
- MPS: Beaver MRA
- NRHP reference No.: 83004396
- Added to NRHP: April 15, 1983

The Alma Crosby House, at 115 E. 1st North in Beaver, Utah, was built in 1867. It was listed on the National Register of Historic Places in 1983.

It was built as a one-and-a-half-story "T"-plan house. It was deemed "significant because of its early date (for Beaver), its nearly unaltered appearance and its construction materials. The home was built by Jonathan Crosby and his son Alma, as Alma's residence. The walls are made of mud concrete and adobe brick and it was an early permanent residence by Beaver standards, being built in 1867. / Alma Crosby's daughter Mae (she is 99 years old [in 1978]) reports that Alma was a farmer and did not have very much time to work on his home, so his father Jonathan helped him a great deal. Jonathan was a carpenter, who made furniture, but he was also able to make the adobe bricks that went into the house. The diaries of Jonathan and his wife Caroline are on microfilm at the office building of the Church of Jesus Christ of Latter-day Saints' headquarters in Salt Lake City."
