= Caleb Baldwin House =

- U.S. National Register of Historic Places
- Location within Utah Location within the United States
- Location: 195 S. 400 East, Beaver, Utah
- Coordinates: 38°16′17″N 112°37′59″W
- Area: less than one acre
- Built: c.1885, c.1900
- Architectural style: Hall & Parlor; T-plan
- MPS: Beaver MRA
- NRHP reference No.: 83003834
- Added to NRHP: November 30, 1983

The Caleb Baldwin House, at 195 S. 400 East in Beaver, Utah, is a historic hall and parlor plan house built around 1885. It was listed on the National Register of Historic Places in 1983.

It was built of pink rock, including pink rock lintels above its door and windows. Its walls are 18 inches (0.46 m) thick. It has elements of Greek Revival style including symmetry of two windows, door, and two windows across its front facade, and Greek Revival-style cornice. The house has a T-plan extension to the rear, and a further pink rock addition to the rear added in c.1900, plus a shed roof frame addition of c.1910.
