= William Morgan House (Beaver, Utah) =

- U.S. National Register of Historic Places
- Location within Utah Location within the United States
- Location: 110 W. 600 North, Beaver, Utah
- Coordinates: 38°16′57″N 112°38′36″W
- Area: less than one acre
- Built: 1910
- MPS: Beaver MRA
- NRHP reference No.: 83004409
- Added to NRHP: April 15, 1983

The William Morgan House, at 110 W. 600 North in Beaver, Utah, was built in 1910. It was listed on the National Register of Historic Places in 1983.

It is a brick house, with brick laid in common bond, upon a black rock foundation. It was built in vernacular style but reflects influences of Queen Anne, including its irregular massing. It has gables with decorative shingle work and full return cornices. It was built in a transitional period between common usage of traditional vernacular architecture and adoption of high styles that became common in Beaver after 1915.
