= Louis W. Harris House =

- U.S. National Register of Historic Places
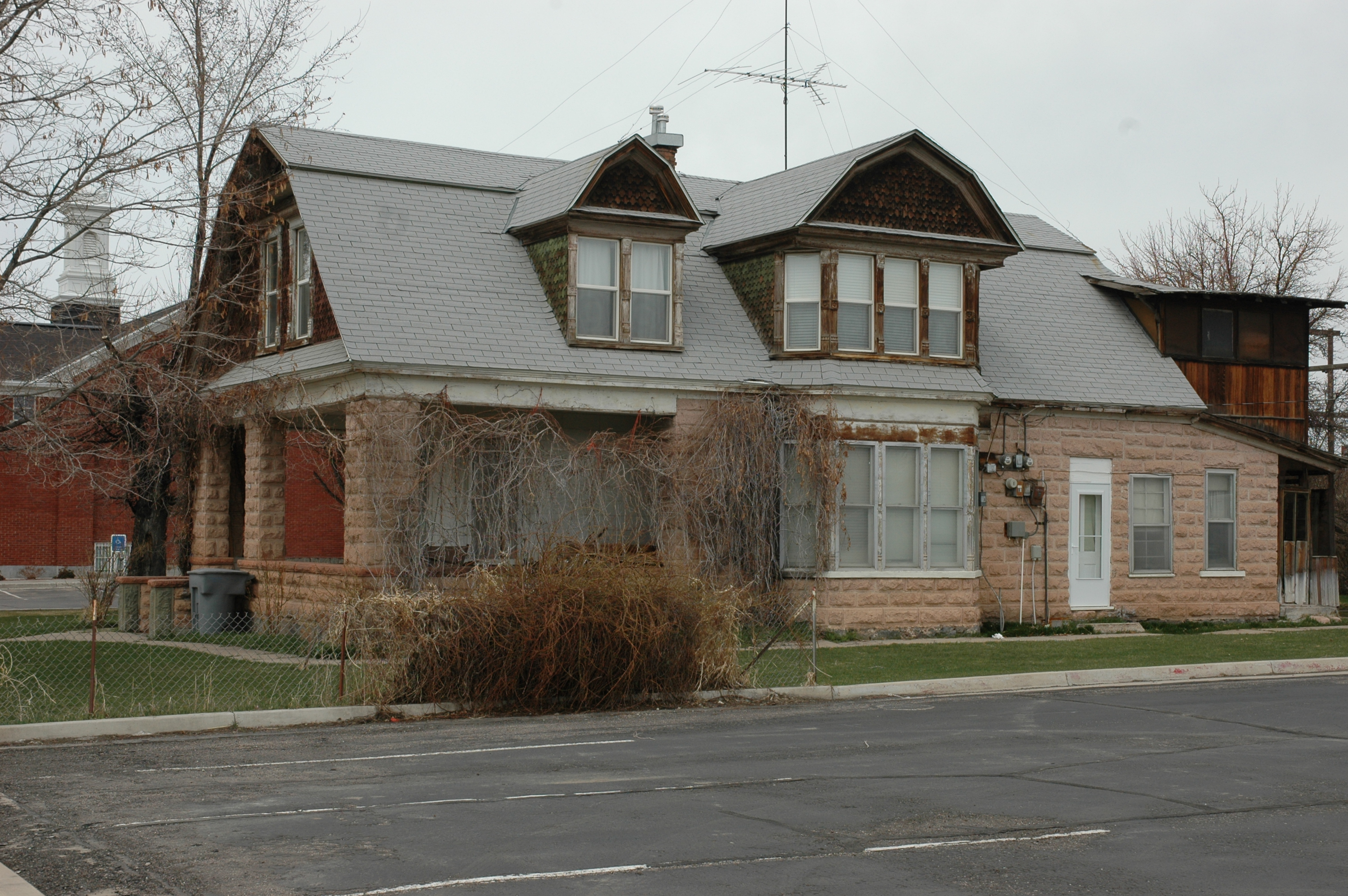

- Location within Utah Location within the United States
- Location: 55 E. 200 North, Beaver, Utah
- Coordinates: 38°16′39″N 112°38′03″W
- Area: less than one acre
- Built: 1905
- Built by: Louis W. Harris
- MPS: Beaver MRA
- NRHP reference No.: 83004405
- Added to NRHP: April 15, 1983

The Louis W. Harris House, at 55 E. 200 North in Beaver, Utah, was built in 1905. It was listed on the National Register of Historic Places in 1983.

It was built by stonemason Louis W. Harris for himself and his family.

== See also ==
- Louis W. Harris Flour Mill, also National Register-listed
