= Samuel White House =

- U.S. National Register of Historic Places
- Location within Utah Location within the United States
- Location: 315 N. 100 East, Beaver, Utah
- Coordinates: 38°16′43″N 112°38′23″W
- Area: Less than one acre
- Built: 1869
- Built by: Samuel Orson White
- Architectural style: Single Cell Crosswing
- MPS: Beaver MRA
- NRHP reference No.: 83003944
- Added to NRHP: November 29, 1983

The Samuel White House, at 315 N. 100 East in Beaver, Utah, was built in 1869. It was listed on the National Register of Historic Places in 1983.

The original house was built in 1869-70 by Samuel Orson White and his three brothers. A cross-wing addition was added over about four years starting in 1887. The house is considered significant as it retains the original one-story section of the house, which was one of the very early permanent homes in Beaver.

Samuel White was born in Nauvoo, Illinois in 1844. He married Ellen Gudgeon. White was a farmer and a firefighter. He reported that the materials for the house cost $86.
