= Fort Cameron =

- U.S. National Register of Historic Places
- U.S. National Historic Site
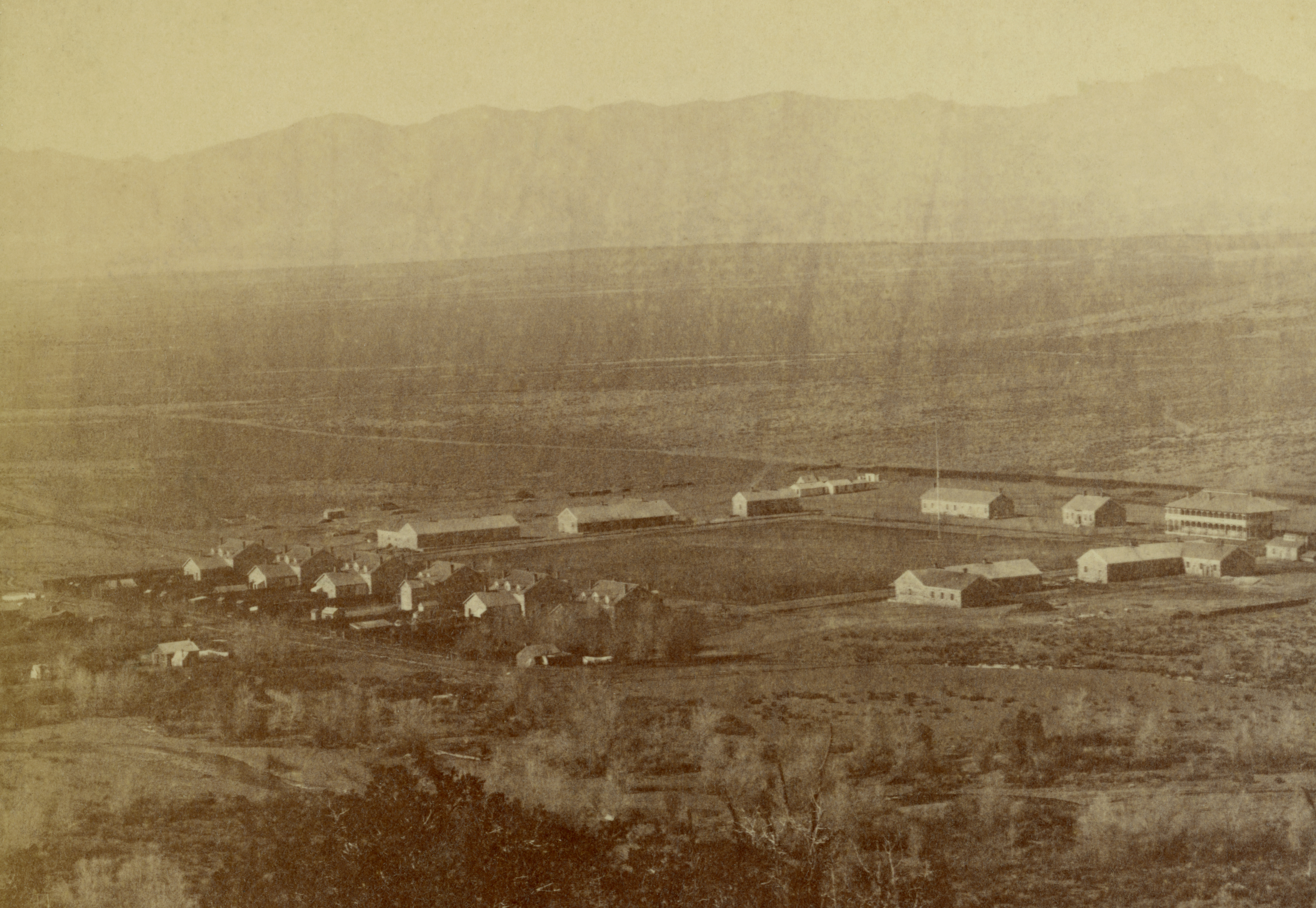
- The fort as seen from the nearby hills

- Location within Utah Location within the United States
- Location: Utah State Route 153
- Nearest city: Beaver, Utah
- Coordinates: 38°16′44″N 112°36′2″W
- Area: less than one acre
- Built: 1872
- Built by: United States Army
- NRHP reference No.: 74001932
- Added to NRHP: September 9, 1974

Fort Cameron was a United States Military installation, located east of Beaver, Utah, and was active from 1872 to 1883. It was demolished in the early 20th century.

== History ==
The fort was established on May 25, 1872 by the 8th Infantry, commanded by Major John D. Wilkins. Located on the north side of the Beaver River, many of the buildings were constructed with a distinctive black rock sourced from the nearby mountains. The new fort included four company barracks, a guardhouse, commissary, hospital, and officers’ quarters. Originally called the Post of Beaver, it was renamed Fort Cameron on July 1, 1874 in honor of Colonel James Cameron, who was killed at the First Battle of Bull Run in 1861.

The fort was active for 11 years until May, 1883. It was originally established to protect settlers of central Utah from local American Indians and to keep an eye on possible Mormon rebellions. The fort had the only hospital within a 150-mile (240 km) radius. Though primarily meant to treat soldiers, it also provided medical care to local civilians.

Cyrus M. Hawley, an associate justice of the Utah Territorial Supreme Court, believed the fort's establishment would lead to the 1857 Mountain Meadows Massacre case being brought to trial, as it would allow witnesses to testify under the protection of the US government. Only one man, John D. Lee, was convicted.

After the fort was decommissioned, the remaining military personnel were reassigned to Fort Douglas in Salt Lake City, and the Fort Cameron buildings were sold to two locals: John R. Murdock and Philo T. Farnsworth. The men helped organize Murdock Academy, which was the Beaver branch of the Brigham Young Academy in Provo (now Brigham Young University). The academy lasted from 1898 to 1922. After the Utah State Legislature passed a law requiring counties to offer tuition-free schools, the LDS Church closed the school and sold the property. All but one of the fort's buildings were razed, and most of the property is now a golf course.

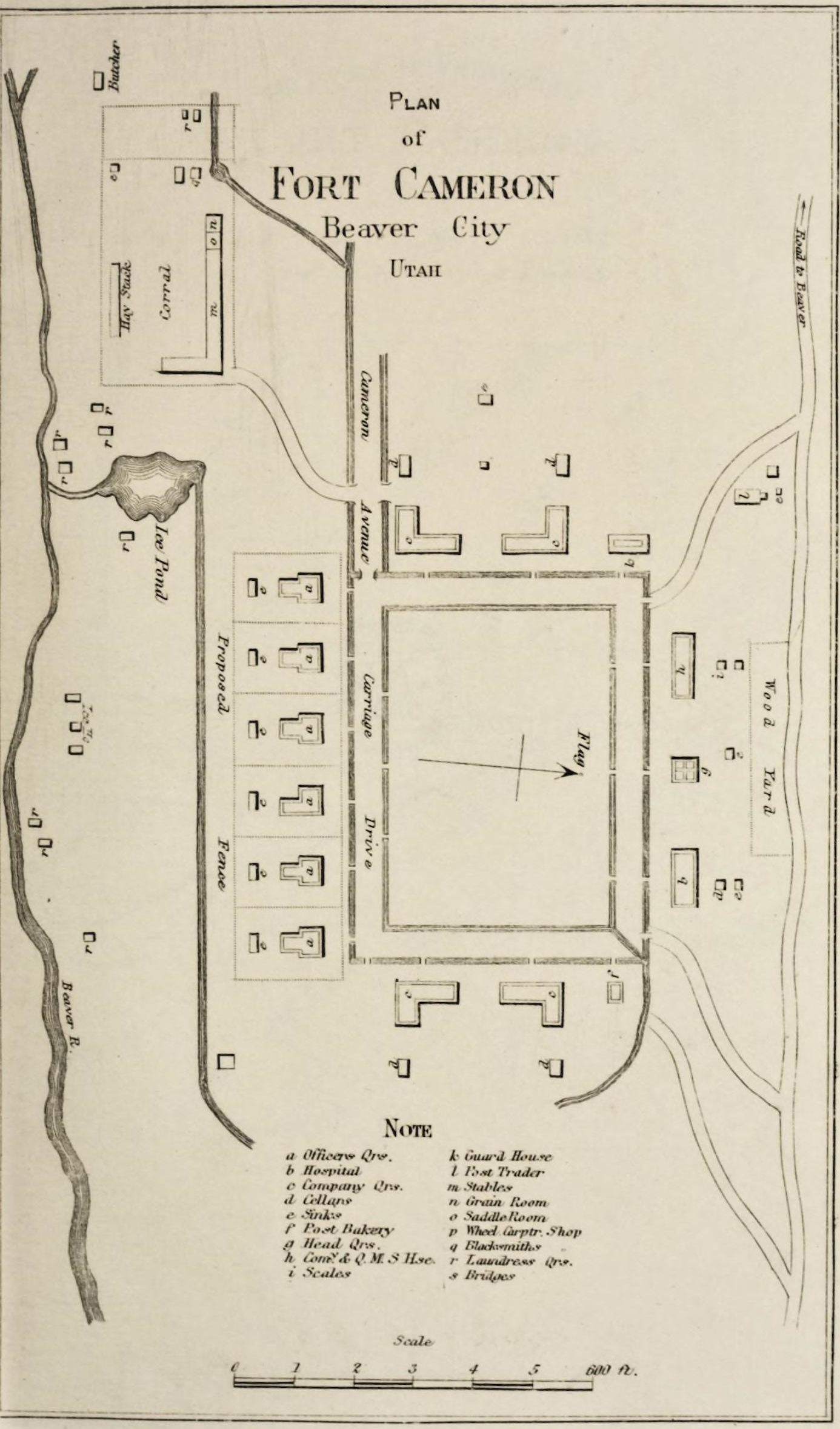
Plan of Fort Cameron, 1870s

== See also ==
- National Register of Historic Places listings in Beaver County, Utah
- Utah War
