= Odd Fellows Hall (Beaver, Utah) =

- U.S. National Register of Historic Places
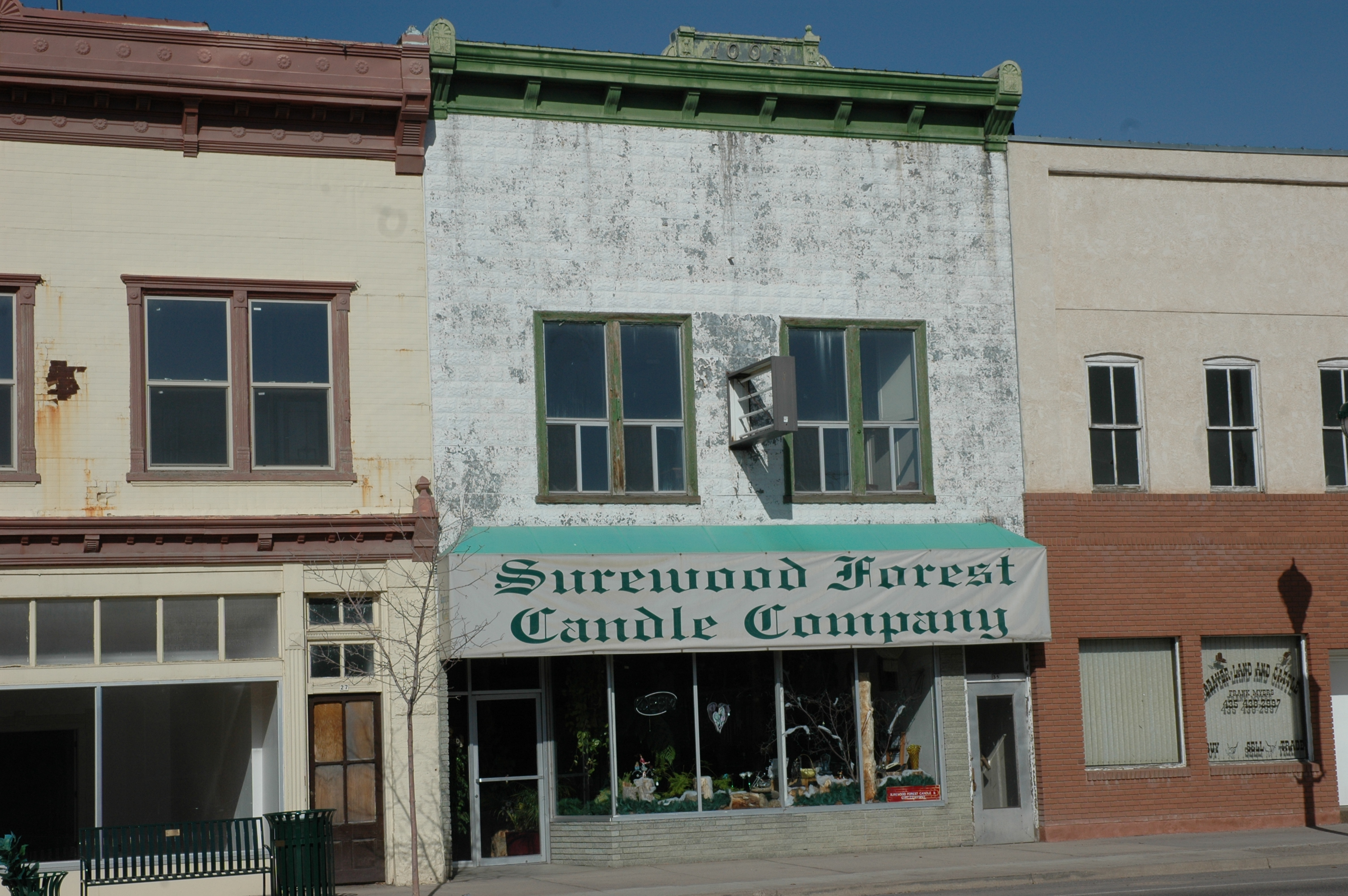
- Building in April 2010

- Location within Utah Location within the United States
- Location: 33-35 N. Main St., Beaver, Utah
- Coordinates: 38°16′29″N 112°38′29″W
- Area: less than one acre
- Built: 1903
- Architect: Woodhouse, Charles C.
- Architectural style: Early Commercial
- MPS: Beaver MRA
- NRHP reference No.: 83003885
- Added to NRHP: November 29, 1983

The Odd Fellows Hall in Beaver, Utah was built in 1903 in Early Commercial architecture style. Its original owner was probably Charles C. Woodhouse. It served historically as a clubhouse, as a meeting hall of Odd Fellows, and as a specialty store. It was listed on the National Register of Historic Places in 1983.

It is a two-story brick commercial building, one of only four surviving-with-integrity historic commercial buildings on Beaver's Main Street. Its first floor is a storefront with display windows and an indented entry; its second floor is mad eof pressed metal made to resemble stone. It has a pressed metal cornice with "IOOF" initials of the International Order of Odd Fellows.
