= Atkins and Smith House =

Historic house in Beaver, Utah, United States

- U.S. National Register of Historic Places
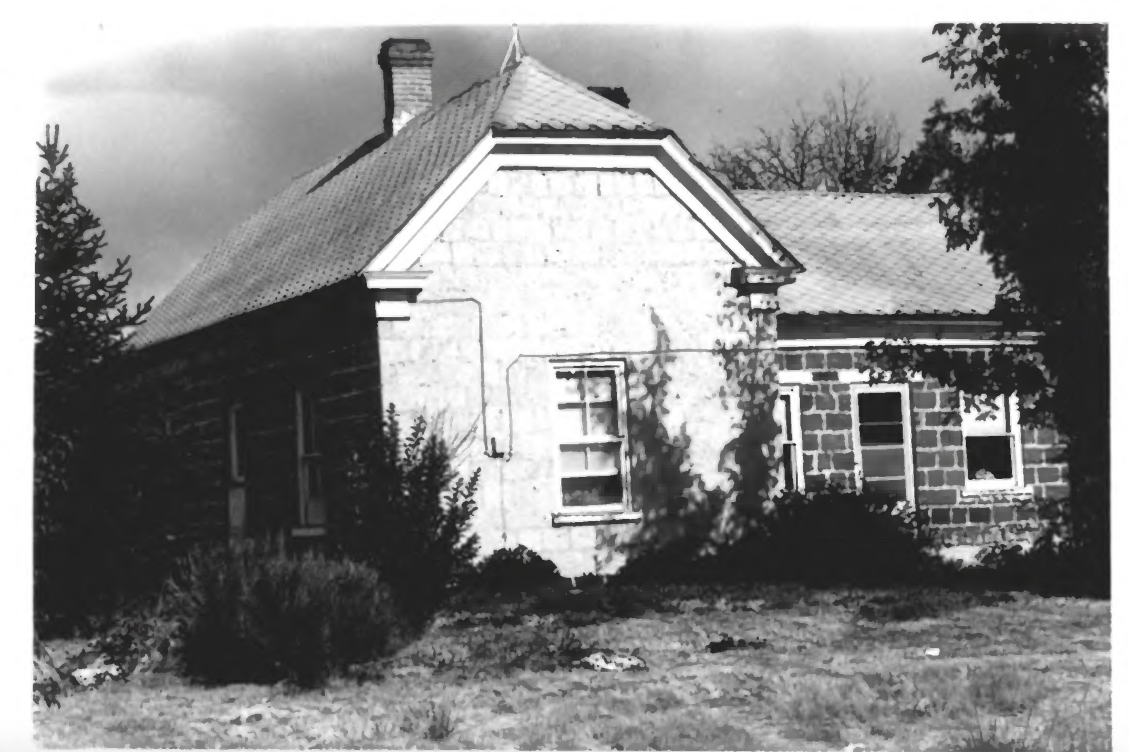
- Atkin and Smith House, 1981

- Location within Utah Location within the United States
- Location: 390 North 400 West; Beaver, Utah; United States
- Coordinates: 38°16′43″N 112°38′49″W
- Area: less than one acre
- Built: 1873, c. 1890
- Built by: Thomas Frizer
- MPS: Beaver MRA
- NRHP reference No.: 83004390
- Added to NRHP: April 15, 1983

The Atkins and Smith House, is a historic house in Beaver, Utah, United States, that is listed on the National Register of Historic Places (NRHP).

== Description ==
The house is located at 390 North 400 West and was built in 1873.

It was built in two parts, probably both by Thomas Frazer, the Scottish-born local stonemason. The first part was a one-room black rock cottage, with a symmetric window-door-window front facade, with ashlar stonework, and with wood lintels and a Greek Revival style cornice. It was one of the first "permanent" houses in Beaver, and was probably built for James Atkins. The second part of the house is a pink rock one-and-a-half-story addition built around 1890 on the north side of the original cottage, with jerkinheads and a broad cornice. Its windows and doors have pink rock lintels. It was built for John A. Smith, then the new owner. The house is significant for its "unaltered, historic design."

The structure was listed on the NRHP April 15, 1983.

== See also ==
- National Register of Historic Places listings in Beaver County, Utah
