= Sarah Eliza Harris House =

Historic house in Utah, United States

- U.S. National Register of Historic Places
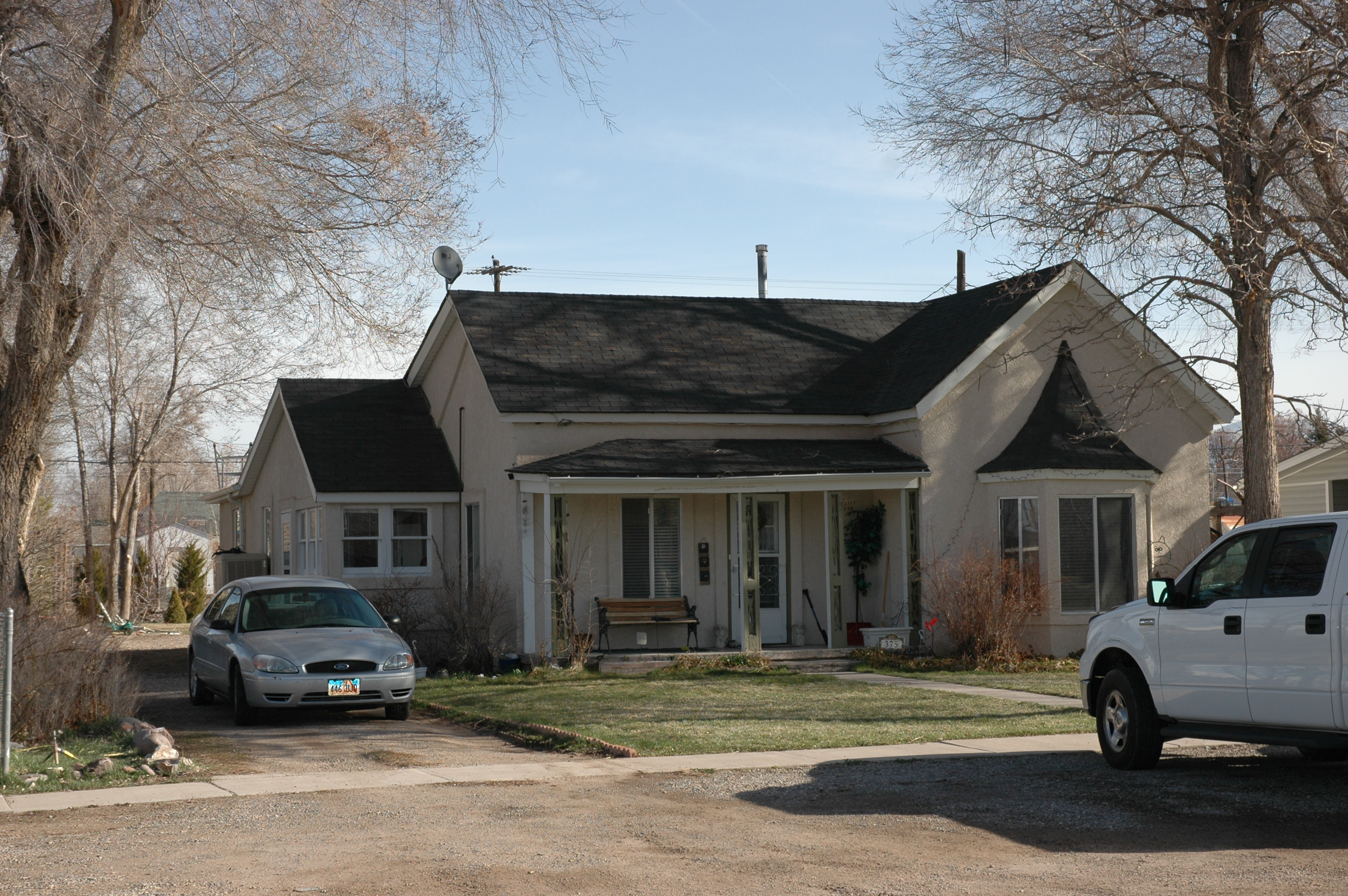
- House in 2010

- Location within Utah Location within the United States
- Location: 375 E. 200 North, Beaver, Utah
- Coordinates: 38°16′39″N 112°38′3″W
- Area: less than one acre
- Built: c. 1865, c.1874 and 1895
- MPS: Beaver MRA
- NRHP reference No.: 83004406
- Added to NRHP: April 15, 1983

The Sarah Eliza Harris House, located at 375 E. 200 North in Beaver, Utah, is a historic house built up around an original adobe cabin from c. 1865. The main part was built c. 1874; an east addition with an unusual bay window was built c. 1895 (probably built by mason Louis W. Harris who owned it during 1884–1897, and probably incorporating brick underneath stucco). It is significant because of its age, its use of adobe in its 16-inch (0.41 m) thick walls, and its generally unaltered condition since 1895.

It was listed on the National Register of Historic Places in 1983.
