= William H. White House =

- U.S. National Register of Historic Places
- Location within Utah Location within the United States
- Location: 510 N. 100 East, Beaver, Utah
- Coordinates: 38°16′54″N 112°38′17″W
- Area: less than one acre
- Built: c.1882
- Architectural style: Late Victorian
- MPS: Beaver MRA
- NRHP reference No.: 84002153
- Added to NRHP: February 23, 1984

The William H. White House, at 510 N. 100 East in Beaver, Utah, is a historic house built around 1882. It was listed on the National Register of Historic Places in 1984.

It is a one-and-a-half-story house on a black rock foundation. It was later extended to the rear with an addition that made the house T-shaped.

The property also includes a black rock granary.
