= Ancil Twitchell House =

- U.S. National Register of Historic Places
- Location within Utah Location within the United States
- Location: 100 S. 200 East, Beaver, Utah
- Coordinates: 38°16′19″N 112°38′10″W
- Area: less than one acre
- Built: 1888
- Architectural style: Greek Revival
- MPS: Beaver MRA
- NRHP reference No.: 84002146
- Added to NRHP: February 23, 1984

The Ancil Twitchell House, at 100 S. 200 East in Beaver, Utah was listed on the National Register of Historic Places in 1984.

It was built for Ancil Twitchell in 1888 as a one-and-a-half-story house with end-wall chimneys, upon a black rock (basalt) foundation. It has elements of Greek Revival in its decoration, including in the wooden pediments above windows and the front door, and in the cornice along the eaves. A one-story brick extension to the rear was added c.1909-11.

It was deemed "significant because it helps to document the pervasive nature of this house form, a house considered by local residents an appropiate [sic] symbol of prosperity and achievement."
