= Samuel Jackson House =

- U.S. National Register of Historic Places
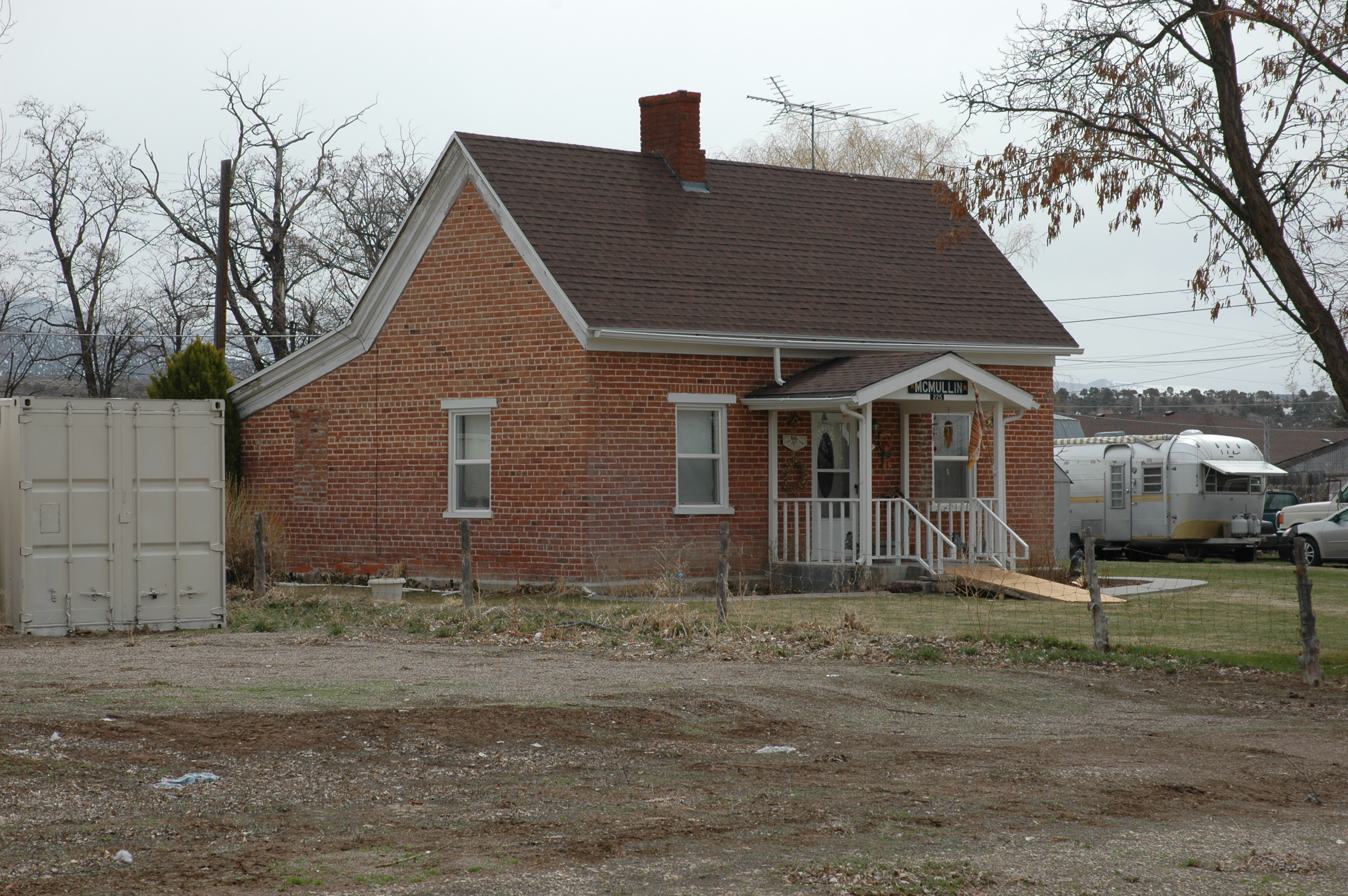

- Location within Utah Location within the United States
- Location: 215 S. 2nd East, Beaver, Utah
- Coordinates: 38°16′14″N 112°38′10″W
- Area: less than one acre
- Built: 1878
- Architectural style: Hall & Parlor Vernacular
- MPS: Beaver MRA
- NRHP reference No.: 83003863
- Added to NRHP: November 30, 1983

The Samuel Jackson House, at 215 S. 2nd East in Beaver, Utah, was built in 1878 and listed on the National Register of Historic Places in 1983.

It is a brick, one-story, central chimney hall and parlor plan house. It was deemed significant because:

its age and architectural design reflect the first major period of Beaver's growth and development. During the 1870s the small log cabins of the initial years of settlement were replaced by small two and three room homes built of brick and stone. The basic one story hall and parlor house type, here represented by the Samuel Jackson house, was an important early form because it was attractive but affordable for the average Beaver resident. These factors, coupled with its traditional nature, made the hall and parlor house the most common and typical house found in 19th century Beaver.
