= John Ashworth House (100 West, Beaver, Utah) =

Historic house in Beaver, Utah, United States

- U.S. National Register of Historic Places
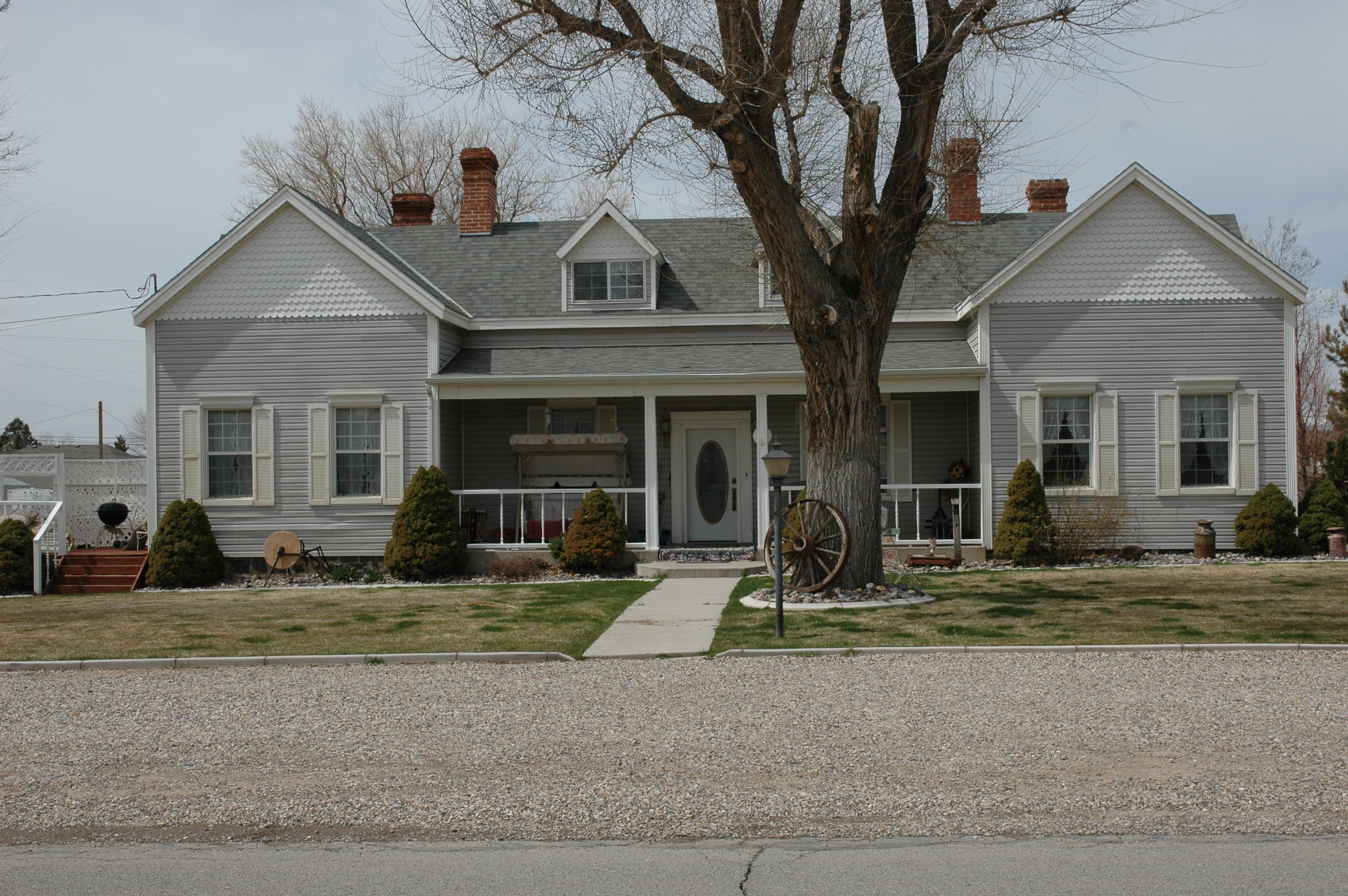
- John Ashworth House, April 2010

- Location within Utah Location within the United States
- Location: 110 South 100 West; Beaver, Utah; United States
- Coordinates: 38°16′19″N 112°38′36″W
- Area: less than one acre
- Built: 1880
- Architectural style: hall & parlor, cross-wing
- MPS: Beaver MRA
- NRHP reference No.: 83003830
- Added to NRHP: November 29, 1983

The John Ashworth House is a historic residence in Beaver, Utah, United States, that is listed on the National Register of Historic Places (NRHP).

== Description ==
The house is located at 110 South 100 West and was built in 1880. (Note: The original exterior of the house was brick. However, sometime between 1981 and August 2008 the exterior was covered with vinyl siding substantially changing its appearance. Another alteration during that same time period was the removal of the exterior doorway on the north side.) It was built for John Ashworth, who was born in England and who was the first manager-superintendent of the Beaver Woolen Mills, and who also served as Beaver's second mayor, during 1880–82. It is a hall and parlor plan house with a shed extension to the rear, built in 1880.

The structure was listed on the NRHP November 29, 1983.

== See also ==
- National Register of Historic Places listings in Beaver County, Utah
