= Enoch E. Cowdell House =

- U.S. National Register of Historic Places
- Location within Utah Location within the United States
- Location: 595 N. 4th West, Beaver, Utah
- Coordinates: 38°16′54″N 112°38′54″W
- Area: less than one acre
- Built: c.1873
- MPS: Beaver MRA
- NRHP reference No.: 82004081
- Added to NRHP: September 17, 1982

The Enoch E. Cowdell House, at 595 N. 4th West in Beaver, Utah, was built around 1873. It was listed on the National Register of Historic Places in 1982.

It was built as a hall and parlor plan house with end wall chimneys, and was expanded by two rear additions in the historic era. It is notable in part for its construction of black rock (basalt).
