= Thomas Frazer House =

- U.S. National Register of Historic Places
- Location within Utah Location within the United States
- Location: 590 N. 300 West, Beaver, Utah
- Coordinates: 38°16′56″N 112°38′47″W
- Area: less than one acre
- Built: 1870, 1872, c.1890
- Built by: Thomas Frazer
- NRHP reference No.: 78002650
- Added to NRHP: November 16, 1978

The Thomas Frazer House, at 590 N. 300 West in Beaver, Utah, was built in 1870 and modified in 1872 and around 1890. It was listed on the National Register of Historic Places in 1978.

It was a work of Scotland-born sculptor and stonemason Thomas Frazer.

At listing date, it was home of NRHP nominator Linda L. Bonar and her husband.
