= Gridley–Howe–Faden–Atkins Farmstead =

- U.S. National Register of Historic Places
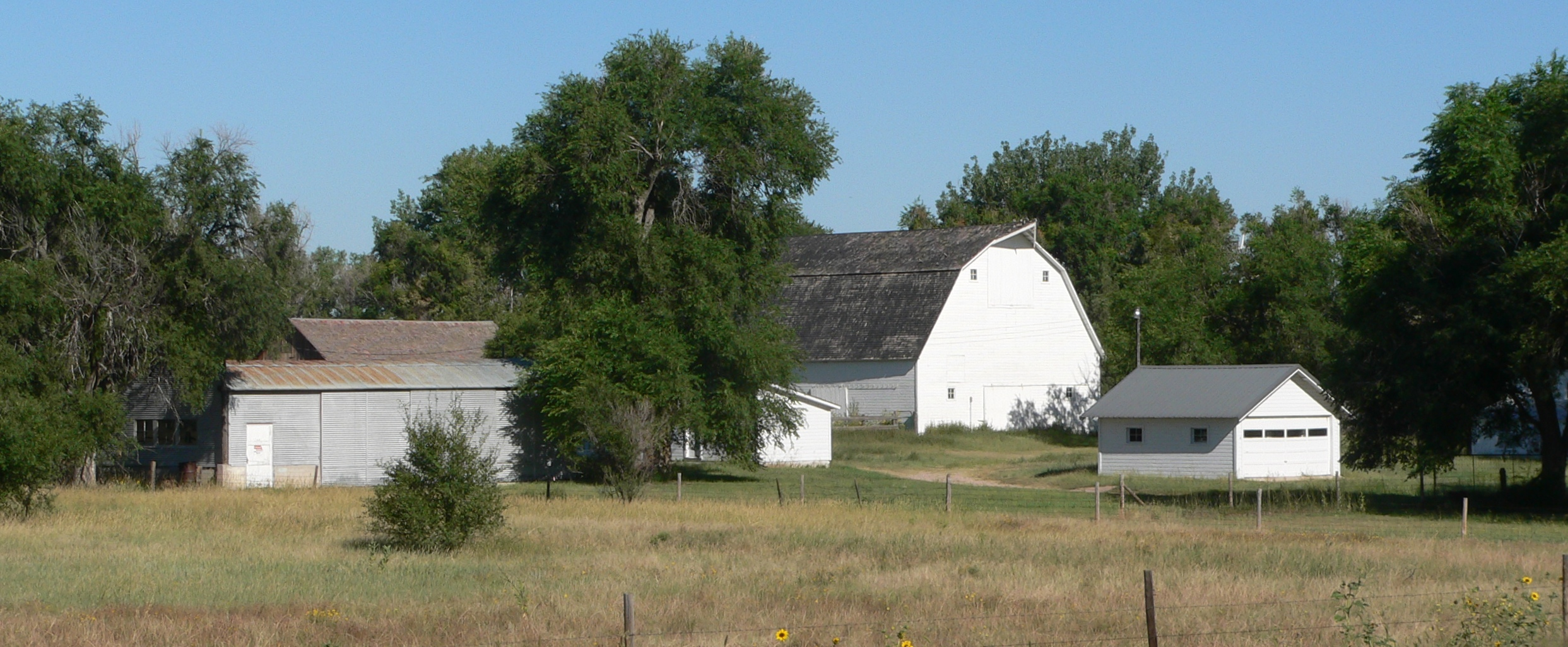

- Location within Nebraska Location within the United States
- Nearest city: Kimball, Nebraska
- Coordinates: 41°14′48″N 103°39′48″W
- Area: 8 acres (3.2 ha)
- Built: 1899
- Built by: Howe, Henry, et al.
- NRHP reference No.: 97000727
- Added to NRHP: July 9, 1997

The Gridley–Howe–Faden–Atkins Farmstead, also known as Brookside Farm, in Kimball County, Nebraska near Kimball, is a historic, well-preserved farmstead. It has buildings and structures dating from 1899 when Henry H. Howe built a 38-by-38-foot (12 m × 12 m) one-story limestone house until 1947 when the last structure on the property was built. The property claim had been proven by James Gridley in 1891, at which time the property was irrigated, but Gridley moved on to Utah, and Howe obtained the farm.

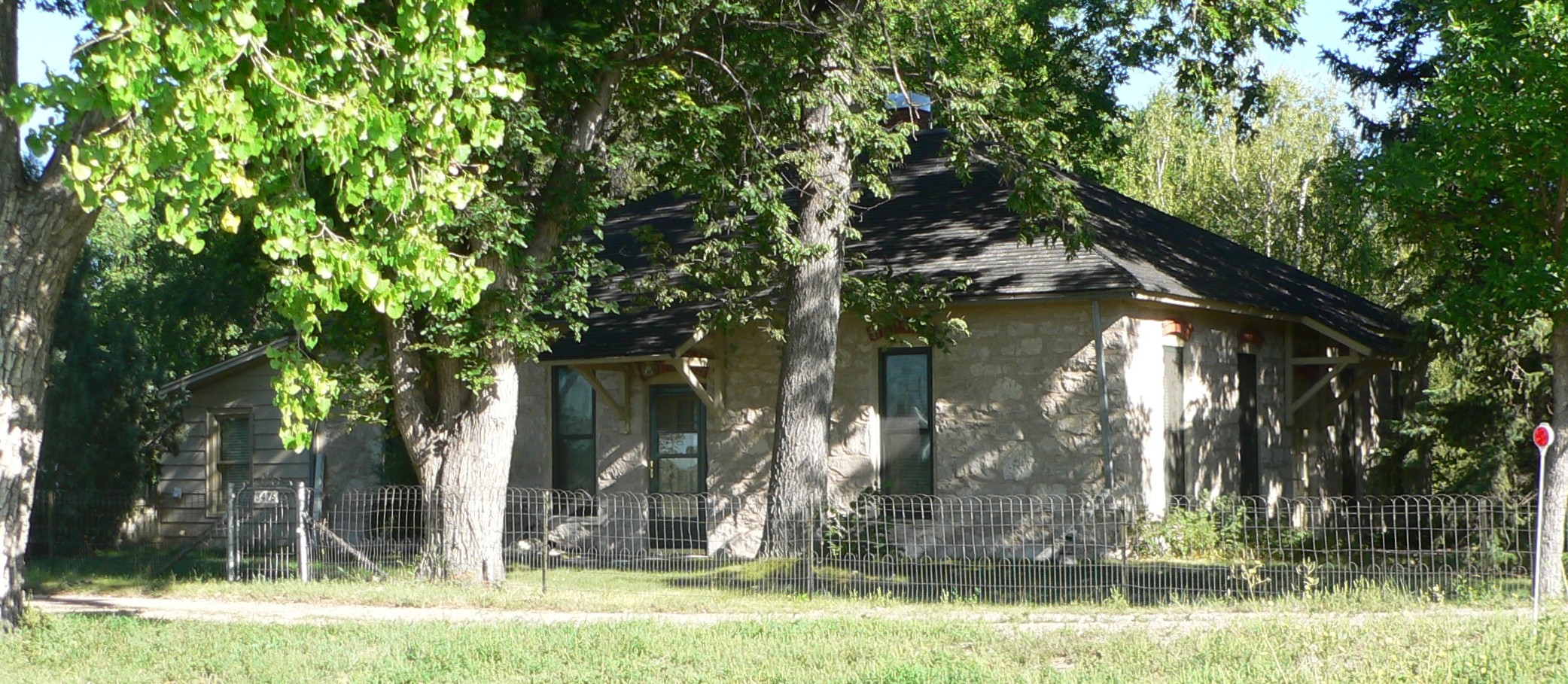
Stone farmhouse, built in 1899

It was listed on the National Register of Historic Places in 1997. The listing included seven contributing buildings and four contributing structures on 8 acres (3.2 ha). It was deemed significant as "a rare, well preserved collection of buildings and structures which reflect changes in agriculture from timber claim to 20th century technology and small scale farm diversification."
