= Elliot Willden House =

- U.S. National Register of Historic Places
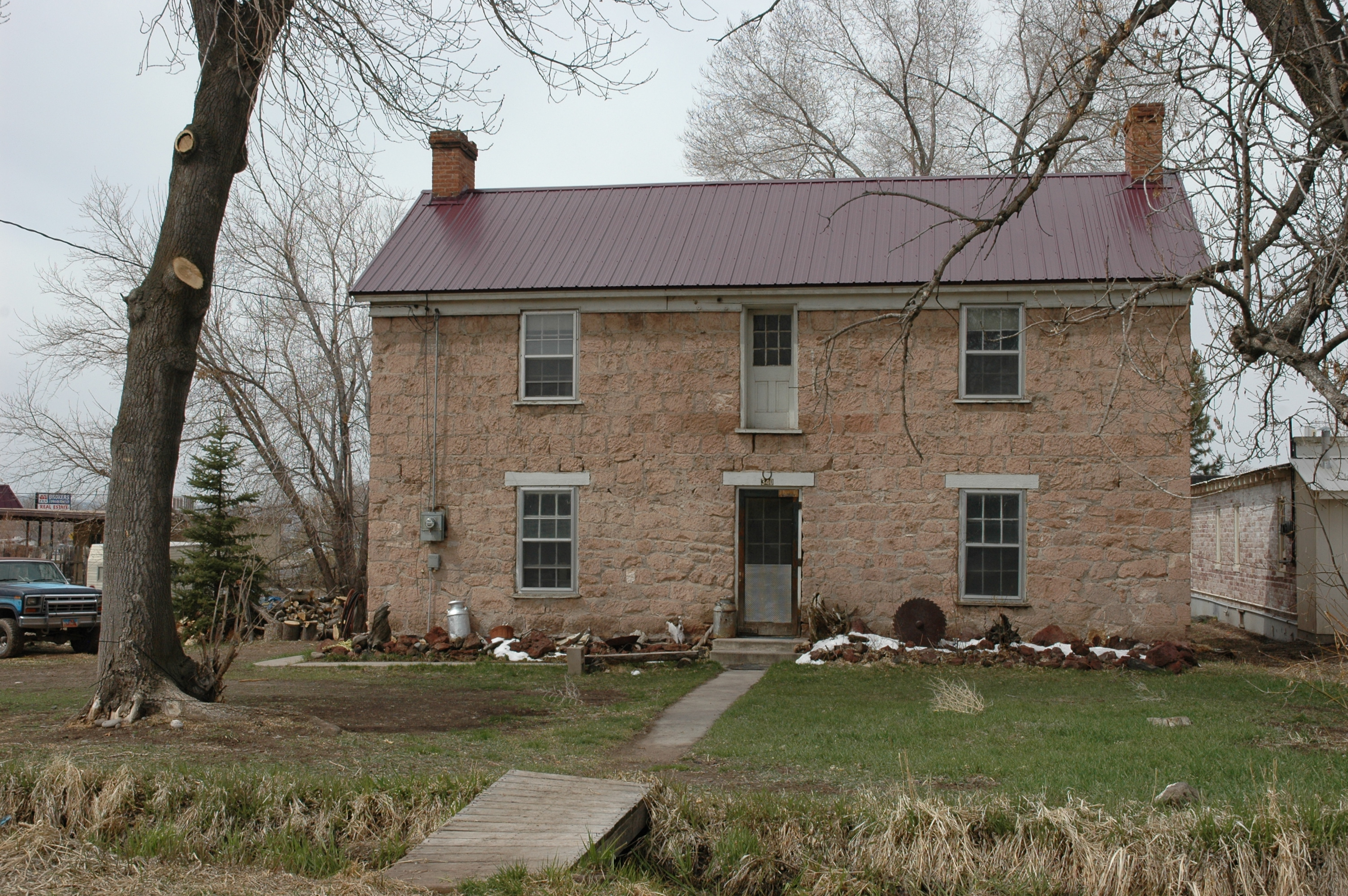

- Location within Utah Location within the United States
- Location: 340 S. Main St., Beaver, Utah
- Coordinates: 38°16′03″N 112°38′28″W
- Area: less than one acre
- Built: c.1885
- Architectural style: Greek Revival, Central Passageway
- MPS: Beaver MRA
- NRHP reference No.: 83003946
- Added to NRHP: November 30, 1983

The Elliot Willden House, at 340 S. Riverside Lane in Beaver, Utah, is a historic stone house built in c.1885, expanding on an older stone cabin. It was listed on the National Register of Historic Places in 1983.

The 1885 house facade is built of pink rock and has elements of Greek Revival style; the older cabin portion, to the rear, is made of black rock.
