= Atkins–Carter House =

- U.S. National Register of Historic Places
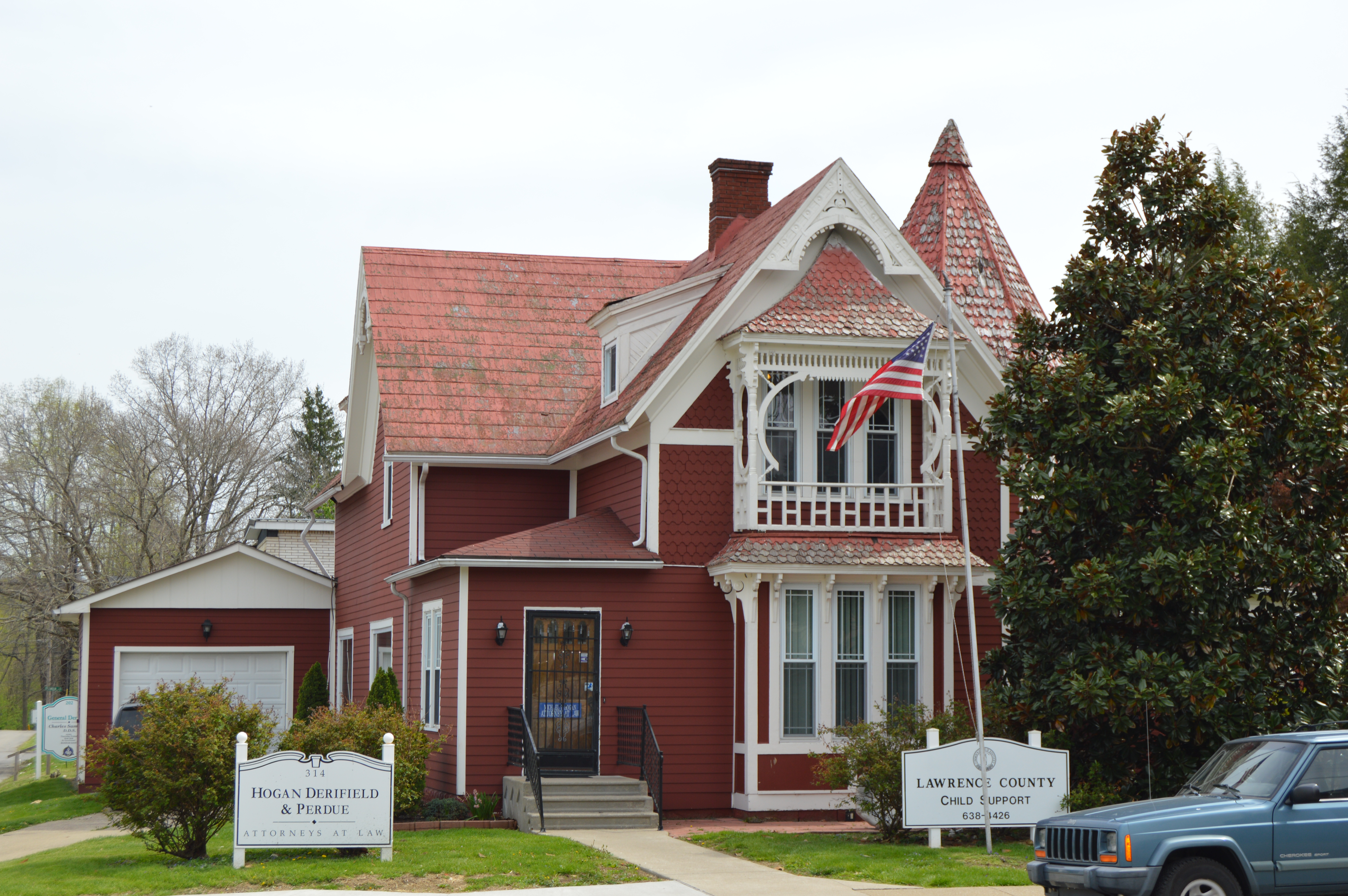

- Location within Kentucky Location within the United States
- Location: 314 E. Madison St., Louisa, Kentucky
- Coordinates: 38°06′54″N 82°36′06″W
- Area: less than one acre
- Built: 1890
- Architectural style: Queen Anne
- MPS: Louisa MRA
- NRHP reference No.: 88002044
- Added to NRHP: November 1, 1988

The Atkins–Carter House, at 314 E. Madison St. in Louisa in Lawrence County, Kentucky, was built in 1890. It was listed on the National Register of Historic Places in 1988.

It is Queen Anne in style, and also has been known as the Sarah E. Atkins House.

It was deemed notable as the "best interpretation of the Queen Anne style in Louisa and probably the entire county."
