= Feargus O'Connor Willden House =

- U.S. National Register of Historic Places
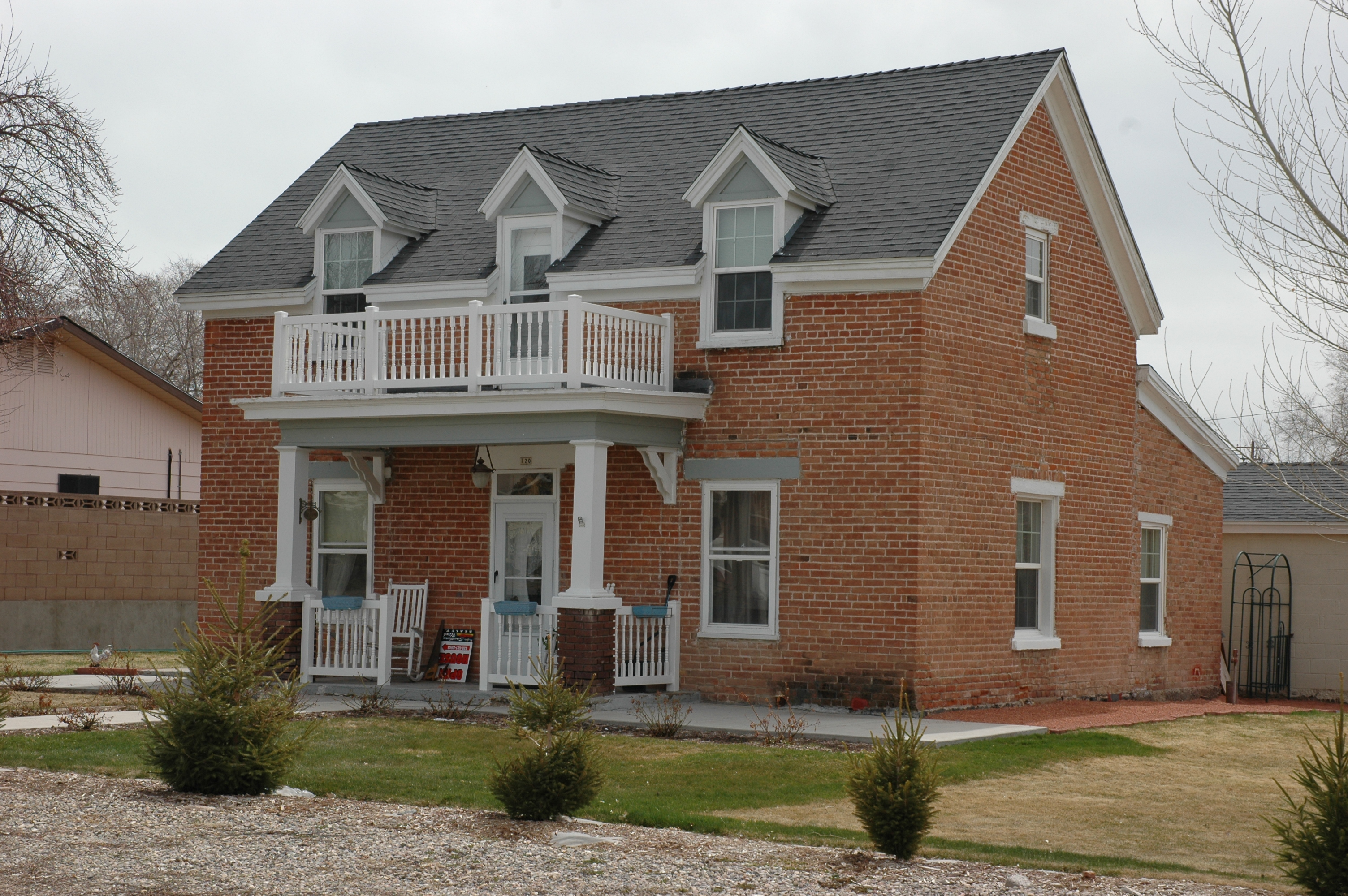

- Location within Utah
- Location: 120 E. 1st South, Beaver, Utah
- Coordinates: 38°16′19″N 112°38′16″W
- Area: less than one acre
- Built: c.1884
- Built by: James Boyter; Feargus O. Willden
- Architectural style: Late Victorian, Hall & Parlor
- MPS: Beaver MRA
- NRHP reference No.: 83003947
- Added to NRHP: November 29, 1983

The Feargus O'Connor Willden House, at 120 E. 1st South in Beaver, Utah, was built in 1884. It was listed on the National Register of Historic Places in 1983.

It is a two-story hall and parlor plan brick house built mostly by stonemason James Boyter and finished by Feargus O'Connor Willden.
