= John Willden House =

- U.S. National Register of Historic Places
- Location within Utah Location within the United States
- Location: 495 N. 200 West, Beaver, Utah
- Coordinates: 38°16′47″N 112°38′43″W
- Area: less than one acre
- Built: 1875
- Built by: Frazer, Thomas
- MPS: Beaver MRA
- NRHP reference No.: 82004105
- Added to NRHP: September 17, 1982

The John Willden House, at 495 N. 200 West in Beaver, Utah, is a historic stone house built in 1875. It was listed on the National Register of Historic Places in 1982.

It is a one-story hall and parlor plan black rock cottage built by Thomas Frazer for John Willden. It has a Greek Revival-style cornice. It has brown granite lintels above its front facade's door and four windows.
