= Beaver, Utah =

City in Utah, United States

- City
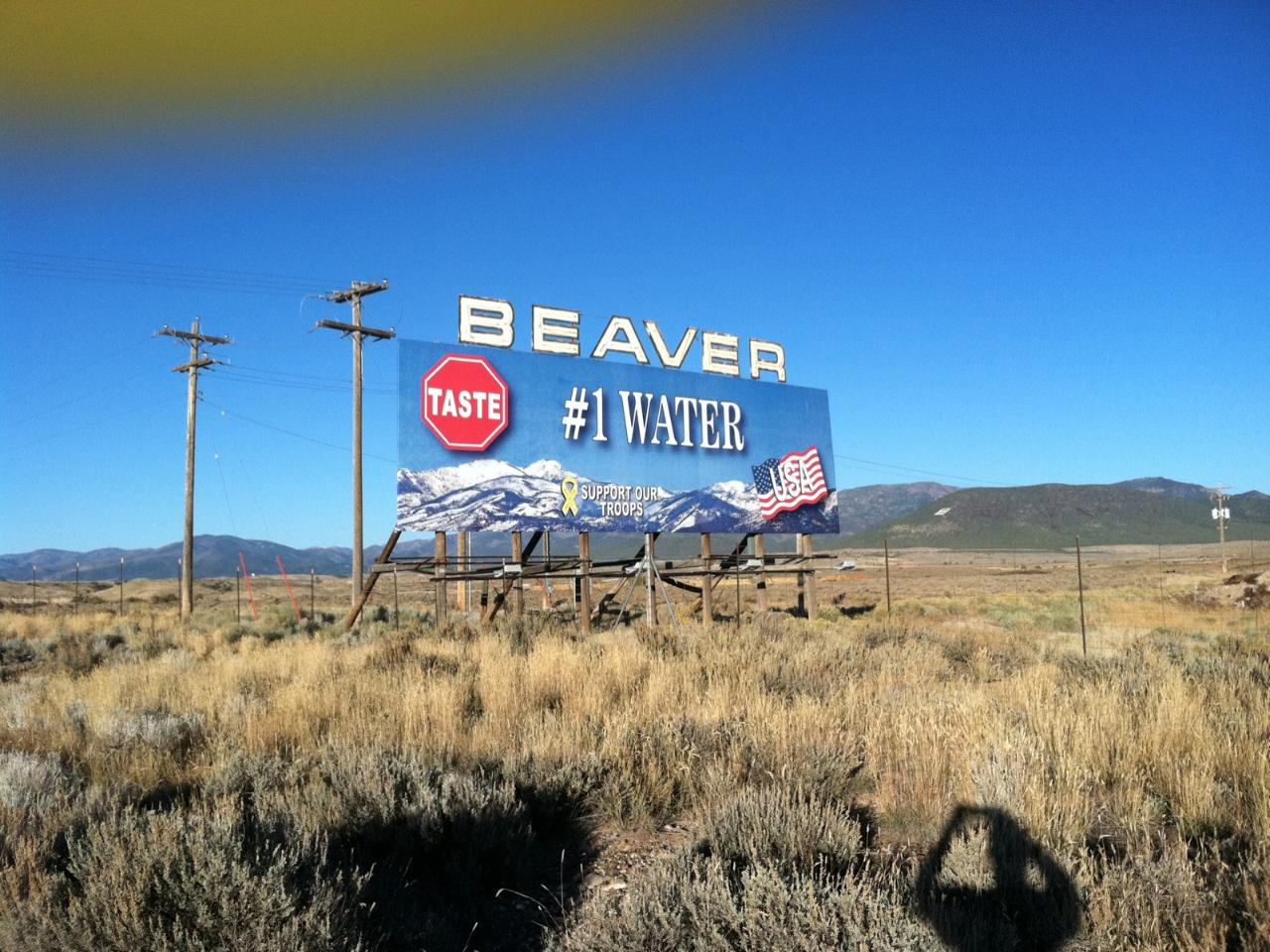
- Welcome sign for Beaver, November 2011

- Location in Beaver County and the state of Utah

- Location of Utah in the United States

- Location in Utah Beaver (the United States) Beaver (North America)
- Coordinates: 38°16′30″N 112°38′20″W
- Country: United States
- State: Utah
- County: Beaver
- Settled: February 6, 1856
- Incorporated: January 10, 1867
- Named for: Beaver River

Government
  - Type: City council

Area
  - Total: 6.68 sq mi (17.30 km^{2})
  - Land: 6.68 sq mi (17.30 km^{2})
  - Water: 0 sq mi (0.00 km^{2})
- Elevation: 5,909 ft (1,801 m)

Population (2020)
  - Total: 3,592
  - Density: 537.8/sq mi (207.6/km^{2})
- Time zone: UTC-7 (MST)
  - Summer (DST): UTC-6 (MDT)
- ZIP code: 84713
- Area code: 435
- FIPS code: 49-04060
- GNIS feature ID: 2409807
- Website: beavercityut.gov

Beaver is a city in Beaver County in southwestern Utah, United States. It is the county seat of Beaver County. The population was 3,592 at the 2020 census, up from the 2010 figure of 3,112.

== History ==
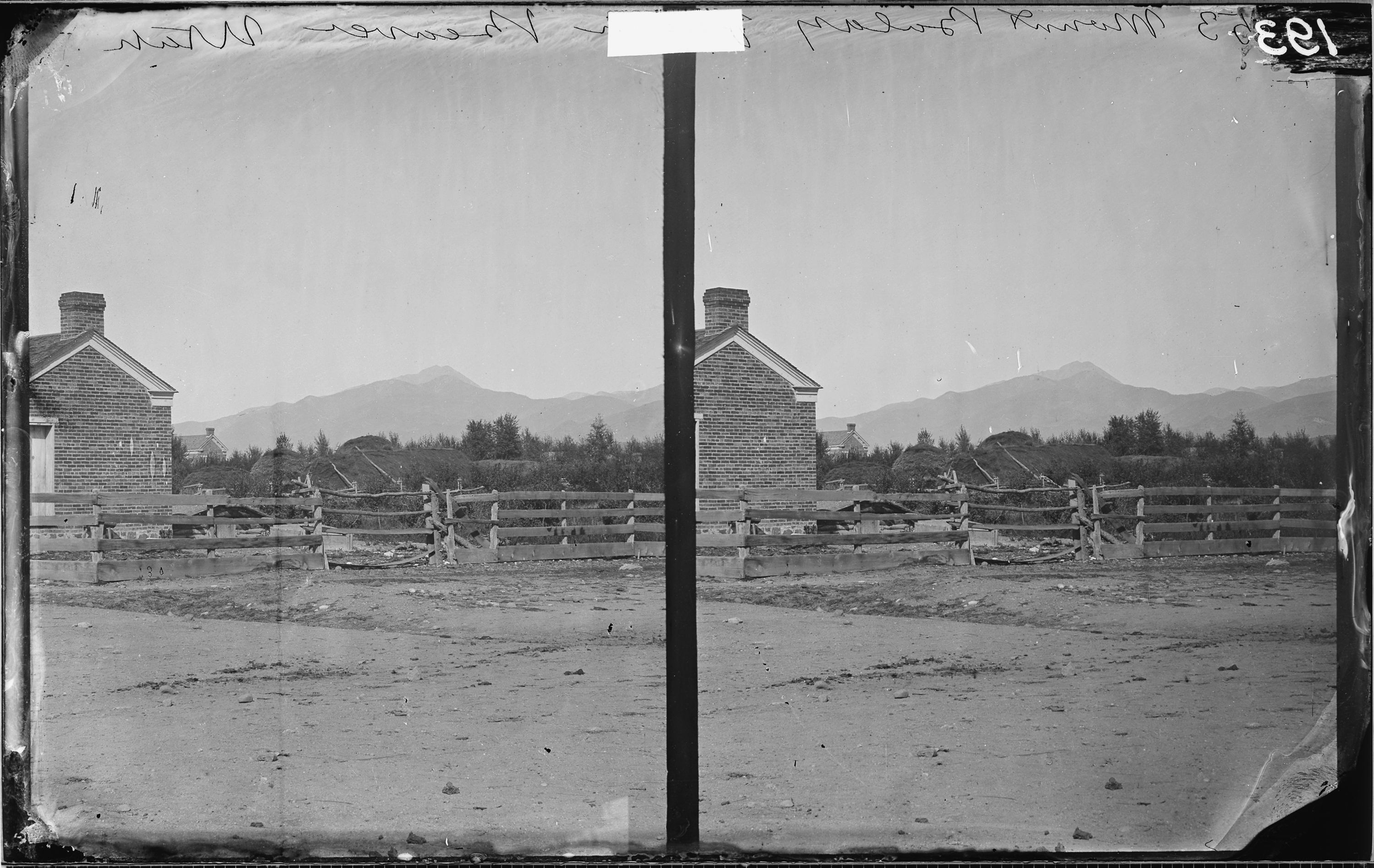
Mt. Baldy viewed from Beaver, photographed by William Bell during the 1872 Wheeler Survey

Indigenous peoples lived in the area for thousands of years, as demonstrated by archeological evidence. A number of identified prehistoric sites have been found in Beaver County, dating to the Archaic and Sevier Fremont periods. A prehistoric obsidian quarry site has been identified in the nearby Mineral Mountains.

The historic Southern Paiute inhabited the region well before encountering the first European explorers. The 1776 Dominguez–Escalante Expedition is the first known European exploration in this area.

In 1847–1848, Mormons from the United States developed a trade route through the Beaver River valley between their new settlements at Salt Lake City in the Utah Territory and Los Angeles, which was still part of Alta California, Mexico. The original route crossed the river three miles downstream from Beaver at the site that later was developed as Greenville. This route became known during the California Gold Rush as the Southern Route of the California Trail. Later called the Mormon Road or California Road, it passed over the Black Mountains between the crossing and Muley Point. Following the United States' victory in the Mexican–American War (1846–1848), it took over California and the Southwest.

In 1855, as part of improvements, the Mormon Road over the Black Mountains was realigned eastward. It was routed from the site that developed as Beaver to Muley Point through more wagon-friendly terrain in Nevershine Hollow and over Beaver Ridge into the canyon of Fremont Wash, rejoining the original road above Muley Point. This road became a winter commercial wagon road, known in California as the Los Angeles – Salt Lake Road, and in Mormon settlements in Utah and Arizona Territory (now southern Nevada) as the California Road.

Beaver was settled in 1856 by Mormon pioneers traveling this road; it was one of a string of Mormon settlements along the road through Utah. By design, these settlements were located a day's ride on horseback apart, which explains the regularity of their spacing. They were generally 30 miles (48 km) apart. Where intervening settlements failed or were absorbed, they became 60 miles (97 km) apart. Beaver was developed between the settlements in the Pahvant Valley and those in the Parowan Valley.

In 1873 the US Army established Fort Cameron, two miles from Beaver, because of Indian raids on the area Mormon settlements. To serve this isolated area, the territorial government placed the Second Judicial Court of the Utah Territory in Beaver from 1870 until 1896, when Utah became a state. Also included in this court's jurisdiction were Iron, Washington, Kane, Garfield, and Piute counties.

In 1856, Mormons migrated to the Beaver Valley from Parowan to the south. George A. Smith called a council meeting in February 1856, and Simeon F. Howd was elected as presiding elder and Edward W. Thompson as clerk. In 1858, numerous migrants from San Bernardino, California, settled here. In December 1859, W. W. Willis and P. K. Smith were authorized by the council to build a sawmill and gristmill on North Creek, and given control of all water on the mill site. By 1869, the Mormon settlers in Beaver were numerous enough to organize a stake. The first stake president was John Murdock.

During the 1870s, settlers made an effort to establish a woolen mill, a tannery, and a dairy industry. Most were engaged in stock raising.

Beaver was the first town in Utah to be electrified. A hydroelectric generation plant was constructed on the Beaver River early in the 20th century. The plant continues to provide a large part of Beaver's power requirements today. Although, contrary to popular belief, it is not locally referred to as "Beaver Dam!"

In 2006, Beaver won a contest for best tasting rural water in the United States. In 2010, Beaver took top honors in the world for best tasting water. Its welcome billboards along I-15 highlight the water quality.

== Geography ==
Beaver is located in eastern Beaver County, along Interstate 15, the main artery for the state. To the east of Beaver lie the Tushar Mountains. The peaks in these mountains rise to over 12,000 ft (3,700 m). The Beaver River flows out of the mountains and through the city of Beaver, passing south of downtown before continuing west towards Minersville and the Escalante Desert basin. The Mineral Mountains rise to the west of Beaver, and the South Hills are to the south.

Interstate 15 runs along the western edge of Beaver, with access from exits 109 and 112. I-15 leads north 22 mi (35 km) to the western end of Interstate 70 at Cove Fort, 55 mi (89 km) to Fillmore, and 199 mi (320 km) to Salt Lake City and south 53 mi (85 km) to Cedar City, 104 mi (167 km) to St George, and 223 mi (359 km) to Las Vegas. Utah State Route 153 heads east from Beaver across the Tushar Mountains 40 mi (64 km) to Junction, and Utah State Route 21 runs west through the Beaver River Valley 17 mi (27 km) to Minersville.

The American Discovery Trail runs through Beaver. An important Beaver landmark is the hillside letter B, which is visible from the freeway (38°15′52.26″N 112°34′57.2″W).

According to the United States Census Bureau, the city has a total area of 6.5 sq mi (16.8 km^{2}), all land.

=== Climate ===
Beaver has a typical Intermountain Region cool semi-arid climate (Köppen BSk), bordering on a humid continental climate (Dfb), with summers characterized by hot days and chilly nights, and cold winters with moderate snowfall.

During the summer, days are hot and usually dry, though on occasions, as in July 1936 – the wettest month on record with 5.76 inches or 146.3 millimeters – monsoonal weather can bring heavy thunderstorms from the Gulf of California. Summer nights are much cooler than in Salt Lake City or Ogden during this season due to Beaver's distance from bodies of water. The hottest recorded temperature in Beaver is 102 °F or 38.9 °C, which has occurred twice on June 21, 1913, and July 26, 1931, and 23.3 days will on average top 90 °F or 32.2 °C, although the hottest monthly mean minimum is only 62.0 °F or 16.7 °C in July 1968.

Winters are cold, though not severe, and generally dry, with the city's intermountain valley location making it sufficiently dry that only 34.1 inches or 0.87 meters of snowfall can be expected each winter. Typically temperatures fall below freezing on all but six nights during winter and on 193.7 nights during an entire year; however maxima will top freezing on all but 14.3 afternoons. Temperatures below 0 °F or −17.8 °C occur on 9.8 nights per winter, and the coldest temperature on record is −34 °F or −36.7 °C on February 9, 1933, during an exceptionally cold western winter. The most snowfall has been at least 80.50 inches (2.0 m) between July 1948 and June 1949, and the most in a month 33.5 inches (0.85 m) during the notoriously cold January 1949 which averaged a record low 9.9 °F or −12.3 °C with mean minimum as low as −2.1 °F or −18.9 °C; by way of contrast, no measurable snow fell during the mild, dry winter of 1962–63. The wettest calendar year has been 1936 with 20.78 inches (527.8 mm) and the driest 1956 with 5.82 inches (147.8 mm); the most in one day being 2.17 inches (55.1 mm) on September 20, 1911.

Climate data for Beaver Canyon, Utah, 1991–2020 normals, 1980–2021 extremes: 7,275 feet or 2,217 meters
Month	Jan	Feb	Mar	Apr	May	Jun	Jul	Aug	Sep	Oct	Nov	Dec	Year
Record high °F (°C)	59 (15)	60 (16)	71 (22)	80 (27)	89 (32)	96 (36)	98 (37)	92 (33)	90 (32)	82 (28)	71 (22)	57 (14)	98 (37)
Mean maximum °F (°C)	53.3 (11.8)	54.0 (12.2)	63.1 (17.3)	70.1 (21.2)	79.8 (26.6)	87.7 (30.9)	91.3 (32.9)	87.5 (30.8)	83.4 (28.6)	74.8 (23.8)	64.4 (18.0)	52.0 (11.1)	91.7 (33.2)
Mean daily maximum °F (°C)	36.9 (2.7)	39.8 (4.3)	47.0 (8.3)	52.8 (11.6)	63.4 (17.4)	74.8 (23.8)	79.7 (26.5)	77.7 (25.4)	71.0 (21.7)	58.0 (14.4)	45.1 (7.3)	35.9 (2.2)	56.8 (13.8)
Daily mean °F (°C)	26.3 (−3.2)	28.4 (−2.0)	34.9 (1.6)	40.3 (4.6)	49.6 (9.8)	59.6 (15.3)	65.6 (18.7)	64.3 (17.9)	57.3 (14.1)	45.4 (7.4)	34.4 (1.3)	25.9 (−3.4)	44.3 (6.8)
Mean daily minimum °F (°C)	15.6 (−9.1)	17.0 (−8.3)	22.8 (−5.1)	27.7 (−2.4)	35.8 (2.1)	44.5 (6.9)	51.5 (10.8)	51.0 (10.6)	43.5 (6.4)	32.7 (0.4)	23.8 (−4.6)	15.8 (−9.0)	31.8 (−0.1)
Mean minimum °F (°C)	−1.5 (−18.6)	−1.0 (−18.3)	6.6 (−14.1)	15.4 (−9.2)	22.7 (−5.2)	33.0 (0.6)	45.1 (7.3)	45.0 (7.2)	30.8 (−0.7)	16.5 (−8.6)	5.2 (−14.9)	−3.1 (−19.5)	−5.4 (−20.8)
Record low °F (°C)	−17 (−27)	−17 (−27)	−4 (−20)	7 (−14)	16 (−9)	27 (−3)	38 (3)	34 (1)	20 (−7)	−3 (−19)	−9 (−23)	−10 (−23)	−17 (−27)
Average precipitation inches (mm)	1.87 (47)	1.82 (46)	2.09 (53)	2.17 (55)	1.86 (47)	0.82 (21)	1.96 (50)	1.64 (42)	1.26 (32)	1.74 (44)	1.27 (32)	1.72 (44)	20.22 (513)
Average snowfall inches (cm)	22.3 (57)	23.7 (60)	19.6 (50)	14.9 (38)	3.7 (9.4)	0.9 (2.3)	0 (0)	0 (0)	0 (0)	5.4 (14)	11.2 (28)	18.8 (48)	120.5 (306.7)
Average extreme snow depth inches (cm)	23 (58)	30 (76)	29 (74)	14 (36)	1 (2.5)	0 (0)	0 (0)	0 (0)	0 (0)	3 (7.6)	7 (18)	15 (38)	31 (79)
Average precipitation days (≥ 0.01 in)	7.4	7.8	7.3	7.0	6.4	3.5	7.7	8.7	5.4	6.1	5.1	6.6	79
Average snowy days (≥ 0.1 in)	6.8	6.6	6.1	4.3	1.3	0.3	0.0	0.0	0.0	1.3	3.7	5.8	36.2
Source 1: NOAA
Source 2: XMACIS2 (records, monthly max/mins & 1991-2020 snow depth)

== Government ==
=== Local Government ===
Beaver uses a city council with five council members and a mayor. The city also has a city manager who runs day-to-day business affairs.

The current city mayor, council members, and city manager are:

- Mayor: Matt Robinson
- Council Members: Lance Cox, Tyler Schena, Alison Webb, Hal Murdock, Robin Bradshaw
- City manager: Jason Brown.

== Demographics ==
Historical population
Census	Pop.	Note	%±
1860	785		—
1870	1,207		53.8%
1880	1,732		43.5%
1890	1,752		1.2%
1900	1,822		4.0%
1910	2,085		14.4%
1920	2,226		6.8%
1930	1,673		−24.8%
1940	1,808		8.1%
1950	1,685		−6.8%
1960	1,548		−8.1%
1970	1,453		−6.1%
1980	1,792		23.3%
1990	1,998		11.5%
2000	2,454		22.8%
2010	3,112		26.8%
2020	3,592		15.4%
U.S. Decennial Census

=== 2020 census ===
As of the 2020 census, Beaver had a population of 3,592. The median age was 32.9 years. 30.6% of residents were under the age of 18 and 13.2% of residents were 65 years of age or older. For every 100 females there were 125.5 males, and for every 100 females age 18 and over there were 132.9 males age 18 and over.

0.0% of residents lived in urban areas, while 100.0% lived in rural areas.

There were 1,094 households in Beaver, of which 38.9% had children under the age of 18 living in them. Of all households, 57.8% were married-couple households, 18.7% were households with a male householder and no spouse or partner present, and 20.8% were households with a female householder and no spouse or partner present. About 24.9% of all households were made up of individuals and 12.6% had someone living alone who was 65 years of age or older.

There were 1,284 housing units, of which 14.8% were vacant. The homeowner vacancy rate was 1.9% and the rental vacancy rate was 6.8%.

Racial composition as of the 2020 census
Race	Number	Percent
White	3,013	83.9%
Black or African American	23	0.6%
American Indian and Alaska Native	46	1.3%
Asian	23	0.6%
Native Hawaiian and Other Pacific Islander	6	0.2%
Some other race	295	8.2%
Two or more races	186	5.2%
Hispanic or Latino (of any race)	524	14.6%

=== 2010 census ===
As of 2010, the total population of Beaver was 3,112, which is 26.81% more than it was in 2000. The population growth rate is higher than the state average rate of 23.77% and is much higher than the national average rate of 9.71%. The Beaver population density is 479.56 people per square mile, which is much higher than the state average density of 32.56 people per square mile and is much higher than the national average density of 81.32 people per square mile. The most prevalent race in Beaver is white, which represent 88.37% of the total population. The average Beaver education level is lower than the state average and is lower than the national average.

=== 2000 census ===
As of the census of 2000, 2,454 people, 856 households, and 653 families resided in the city. The population density was 535.5 people per square mile (206.9/km^{2}). The 1,021 housing units averaged 222.8 per square mile (86.1/km^{2}). The racial makeup of the city was 94.74% White, 0.53% Native American, 0.16% Asian, 3.06% from other races, and 1.51% from two or more races. Hispanics or Latinos of any race were 5.05% of the population.

Of the 856 households, 41.0% had children under the age of 18 living with them, 65.0% were married couples living together, 7.9% had a female householder with no husband present, and 23.6% were not families. About 21.4% of all households were made up of individuals, and 10.6% had someone living alone who was 65 years of age or older. The average household size was 2.84, and the average family size was 3.33.

In the city, the age distribution of the population shows 32.9% under the age of 18, 9.0% from 18 to 24, 23.3% from 25 to 44, 19.7% from 45 to 64, and 15.0% who were 65 years of age or older. The median age was 32 years. For every 100 females, there were 93.5 males. For every 100 females age 18 and over, there were 92.5 males.

The median income for a household in the city was $33,646, and for a family was $37,933. Males had a median income of $29,485 versus $17,159 for females. The per capita income for the city was $14,412. About 6.7% of families and 8.6% of the population were below the poverty line, including 9.0% of those under age 18 and 6.4% of those age 65 or over.

== Notable people ==
- Butch Cassidy, outlaw of the Wild West
- Betty Compson, actress
- Philo Farnsworth, inventor of electronic television and the Farnsworth–Hirsch fusor
- Abe Murdock, U.S. senator and representative from Utah
- Ida Hunt Udall, diarist and homesteader

== See also ==
- List of cities and towns in Utah
