= Black House =

A blackhouse is a traditional type of thatched house in the Scottish Highlands.

Black House or Blackhouse may refer to:

== Miscellaneous ==
- Blackhouse (band), a Christian industrial band
- Black House (novel), a 2001 horror novel by Stephen King and Peter Straub
- The Blackhouse (novel), a 2011 novel by Peter May
- Black House (film), a 2007 South Korean film, based on a Japanese book of the same name
- Black House (Church of Satan), historic headquarters of the Church of Satan
- Black House, Lviv, a Renaissance building on Lviv Market Square in Ukraine
- Black House (MMA), a martial arts team and gym in Rio de Janeiro, Brazil
- Headquarters of the British Union of Fascists
- The Black House, a 1981 story collection by Patricia Highsmith
- The Black House (album), a 2003 album by black metal band Krieg
- Black House (artistic community), a community of artists in Germany

== Places ==
=== United Kingdom ===
- Blackhouse, Aberdeenshire, a United Kingdom location

=== United States ===
- Hugo Black House, Ashland, Alabama, listed on the National Register of Historic Places (NRHP)
- Arthur F. Black House, Kingman, Arizona, NRHP-listed
- Benjamin Clayton Black House, Searcy, Arizona, NRHP-listed
- William Black Family House, Brinkley, Arkansas, NRHP-listed
- William Black House (La Jolla, California), NRHP-listed
- Mary C. W. Black Studio House, Monterey, California, NRHP-listed
- Samuel M. Black House, Salinas, California, NRHP-listed
- Black House (Church of Satan), headquarters of the Church of Satan in San Francisco, California
- Dr. John A. Black House Complex, Pueblo, Colorado, NRHP-listed in Pueblo County
- Grant-Black House, New Orleans, Louisiana, NRHP-listed in Orleans Parish
- Black Mansion, Ellsworth, Maine, NRHP-listed
- William L. Black House, Hammonton, New Jersey, NRHP-listed in Atlantic County
- J.C. Black House, Carthage, North Carolina, NRHP-listed
- Black-Cole House, Eastwood, North Carolina, NRHP-listed
- George Black House and Brickyard, Winston-Salem, North Carolina, NRHP-listed
- Joseph Black Farmhouse, Circleville, Ohio, NRHP-listed in Pickaway County
- Philip J. Black House, Loudonville, Ohio, NRHP-listed in Ashland County
- Haller–Black House, Seaside, Oregon, NRHP-listed in Clatsop County
- Dr. Walter Black House, Lake Oswego, Oregon, NRHP-listed in Clackamas County
- William Black Homestead, New Cumberland, Pennsylvania, NRHP-listed
- Black House (McMinnville, Tennessee), NRHP-listed
- Thomas C. Black House, Murfreesboro, Tennessee, NRHP-listed
- John M. Black Cabin, Ten Mile, Tennessee, NRHP-listed in Meigs County
- E. B. Black House, Hereford, Texas, NRHP-listed in Deaf Smith County
- John Black House, Beaver, Utah, NRHP-listed in Beaver County
- Alfred L. Black House, Bellingham, Washington, NRHP-listed in Whatcom County
- Merritt Black House, Kaukauna, Wisconsin, NRHP-listed

=== Elsewhere ===
- Baan Dam Museum, also known as the Black House, in Chiang Rai, Thailand
