= Henry C. Gale House =

Henry C. Gale House may refer to:

- Henry C. Gale House (495 N. 1st East, Beaver, Utah), listed on the National Register of Historic Places (NRHP)
- Henry C. Gale House (500 North, Beaver, Utah), listed on the National Register of Historic Places in Beaver County, Utah
