= Black House (artistic community) =

Historic group of artists in Solingen, Germany

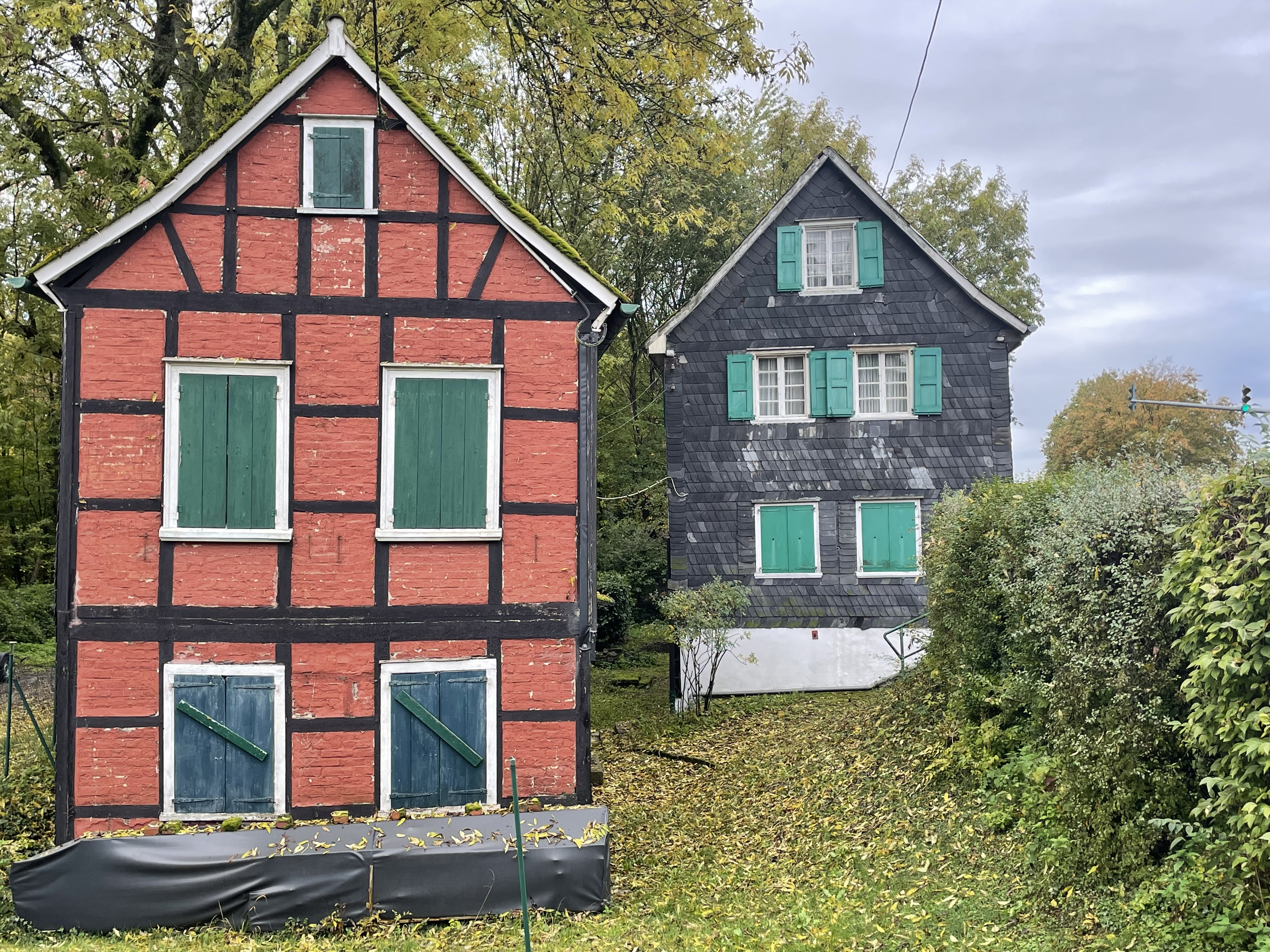
The Red and the Black House – studio houses for the Solingen artists' colony

The Artists' Colony Solingen, known as the "Black House", refers to a group of painters consisting of Erwin Bowien, Bettina Heinen-Ayech, and Amud Uwe Millies, who formed an artistic community in Solingen (Germany) after the Second World War.

== Location ==
The origins of the colony lie in the literary and cultural salon hosted by Erna Heinen‑Steinhoff (1898–1969) and her husband, the poet and journalist Hanns Heinen (1895–1961). Their home attracted prominent intellectuals, among them the Nobel Prize laureate Sigrid Undset and the philosopher Rabindranath Tagore. In the late 1920s, the painter Erwin Bowien joined their circle. In 1932, the Heinens acquired two historically significant half-timbered houses in the Solingen district of Höhscheid. Known as the "Red House" and the "Black House", the buildings developed over the following nine decades into meeting places for artists, writers, and intellectuals, and served as studio houses.

== Artists ==
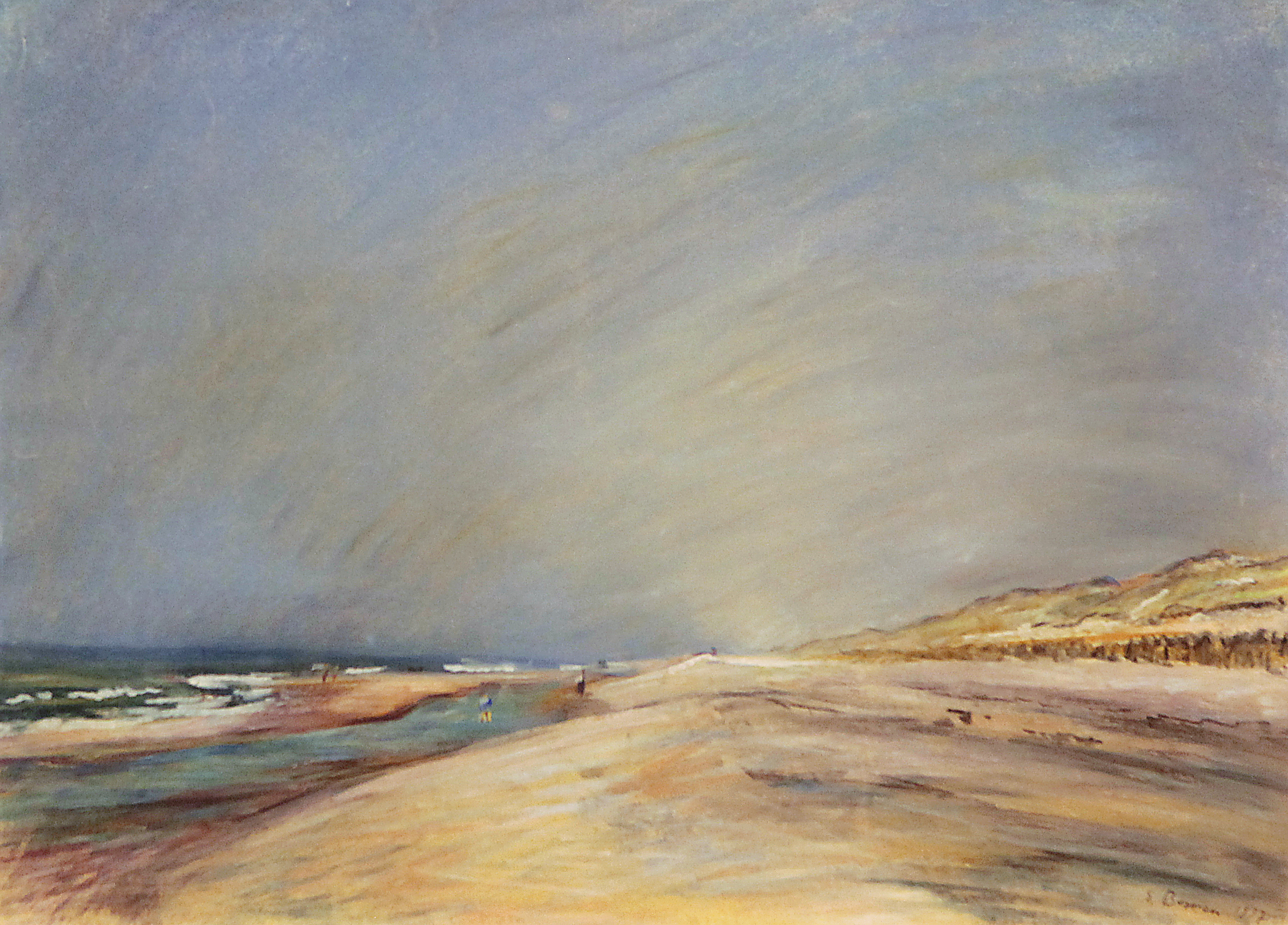
Egmond aan Zee, by Erwin Bowien (1937)

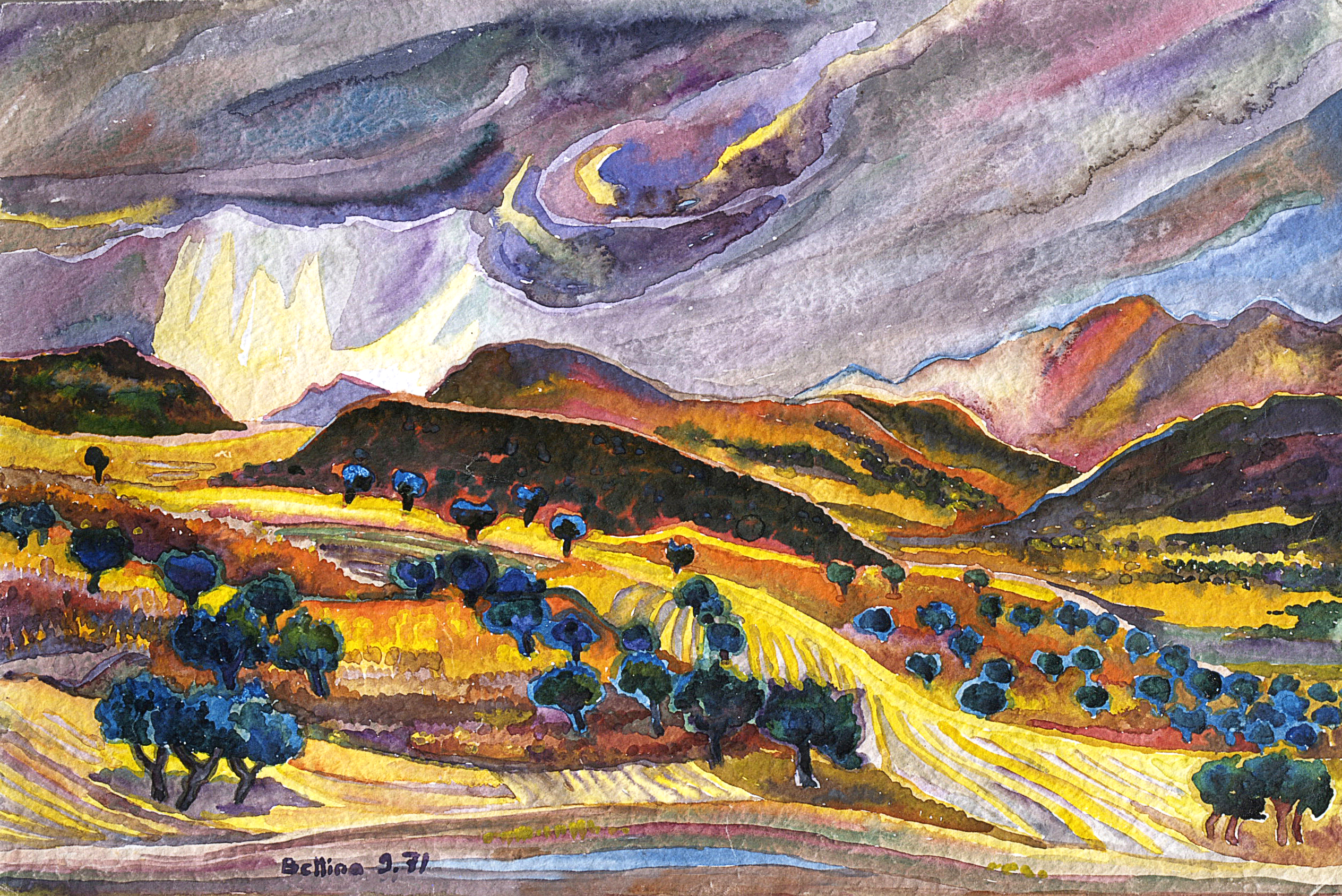
Summer thunderstorm in Algeria, by Bettina Heinen-Ayech (1971)

Bowien, Heinen‑Ayech, and Millies became known as Solingen's "triumvirate of painters". Contrary to the prevailing artistic trends of their time, which favoured abstraction, the three focused primarily on portraiture, landscapes, cityscapes, and scenes of everyday life.

Erwin Bowien also shaped the colony's intellectual outlook. He regarded himself early on as a European, sought dialogue with other cultures, spoke several languages, and actively promoted international understanding. Bettina Heinen‑Ayech, married to an Algerian, spent many years in her husband's homeland and created extensive bodies of work depicting the Algerian landscape. From the mid‑1960s onward, Uwe Millies travelled through Eastern Europe, the Far East, and the Americas. During a journey to Egypt he received the additional name Amud ("staff"). The three artists also travelled widely together across Europe: "The trio undertook many painting journeys together. Although they belonged to different generations, they were personally very close." The two houses in Solingen and the surrounding Bergisches Land remained the central anchor of their activities.

== Legacy ==
In 2020, a memorial plaque for Heinen-Ayech and the members of the artists' colony was installed on the 'Schwarzes Haus'.

In January 2022, the non‑profit 'Bettina Heinen-Ayech Foundation - Foundation for Art, Culture and International Dialogue' was established. The foundation preserves the legacy of the artists of the colony.

In 2023, the "Black House" was admitted to the European Federation of Artists' Colonies and later included in the Council of Europe's cultural route "Impressionisms Routes". Since then, the work of the artists of the Solingen Artists' Colony has been presented in various exhibitions, including at the Gemäldegalerie Dachau, at Wasserburg Haus Graven e.V., and at the Kunstraum Churfranken in Klingenberg am Main.

With reference to the Solingen "Black House" artists' colony, the Center for Rhineland Studies at Heinrich Heine University Düsseldorf organized the conference "Artists' Colonies and Politics" in 2025, held in Simonskall and Zerkall.

== Exhibitions ==
- 2024 Gemäldegalerie Dachau (31 October 2024 to 27 April 2025): In der Welt unterwegs: Die Künstlerkolonie Solingen
- 2025 Georgsmarienhütte, Museum Villa Stahmer (18 May to 29 June)
- 2026, Klingenberg am Main: Kunstraum in Churfranken (21 March to 31 May 2026)
- 2026 Langenfeld, Wasserburg Haus Graven: Bettina Heinen-Ayech and the Solingen Artists' Colony (12 Apri to 5 July 2026 )

== Literature ==
- Ayech, Haroun; Cohen, Laura (eds.). Travelling the World: The Solingen Artists' Colony. Zweckverband Dachauer Galerien und Museen, 2024. ISBN 978-3-949683-07-7.
- Battenfeld, Beate. "The History of the Steigerhaus in Solingen-Höscheid, Germany." Bettina: Magazine for Art, Culture and International Dialogue, no. 37 (2024). ISSN 2751-8469.
