= Alexander Boyter =

American stonemason and builder

Alexander Thomas "Scotty" Boyter (c. 1848 – September 15, 1926) was an American stonemason and builder who was active in Beaver, Utah. He is known for his use of local "pink tuff" rock, and several of his works are listed on the National Register of Historic Places. His brother James Boyter also was a mason and they sometimes worked together.

== Biography ==
Boyter was born in Dundee, Scotland in 1848 or 1849. He served as a soldier at Fort Cameron, Utah, and returned to Scotland after being discharged from the Army in 1875. Along with his brother James and their mother, Boyter settled in Beaver, Utah in the late 1870s.

In 1879, Boyter was married to Alice Bryant (Davey) Boyter, a native of Wales born in 1858. They had several children, including Rosella Sophia (born Oct. 1880), Mary Davey (born August 1883), Georgina (born 1885), William (born 1887), Arreta (born November 1889), Carlisle (born March 1893), Alexander, Jr. (born March 1897), and George Davey (born c. 1900).

== Work as a stonemason ==
Working as a stonemason, Boyter built a number of houses in Beaver using local bricks and "pink tuff" rock from nearby hills. He sometimes worked on construction projects with his brother James, though James devoted most of his efforts to carving monuments, many of which are found in the Beaver cemetery. Henry Boyter and Philo Boyter also worked as stonemasons in and around Beaver. A number of Boyter's works are listed on the U.S. National Register of Historic Places ("NRHP"). In the NRHP nomination form for his Alexander Boyter House (built 1882), the nominator described Boyter's stonework as "fabulous." In the NRHP nomination for his Henry C. Gale House, the nominator noted that Boyter's style was "characterized by a herringhone chisel pattern on the smoothed rock faces and raised, square mortar joints."

== List of works ==
Works attributed to Boyter and/or his brother James Boyter include (with attribution):

- James Atkin House, 260 W. 300 North, Beaver, Utah (Boyter, Alexander), NRHP-listed
- John Black House, 595 N. 100 West, Beaver, Utah (Boyter, Alexander), NRHP-listed
- Alexander Boyter House, built 1882, at 590 N. 200 West, Beaver, Utah (Boyter, Alexender), NRHP-listed
- James Boyter House, 90 W. 200 North, Beaver, Utah (Boyter, James), NRHP-listed
- James Boyter Shop, 50 W. 200 North, Beaver, Utah (Boyter, James), NRHP-listed
- Erickson House, 290 N. 300 West, Beaver, Utah (Boyter, Alexander), NRHP-listed
- Henry C. Gale House, 495 N. 1st East, Beaver, Utah (Boyter, Alexander), NRHP-listed
- Low Hotel, 95 N. Main St., Beaver, Utah (Boyter, Alexander & Henry), NRHP-listed
- Dr. Warren Shepherd House, 50 W. 1st North, Beaver, Utah (Boyter Brothers), NRHP-listed
- Mitchell M. Stephens House, 495 N. 200 East, Beaver, Utah (Boyter, Alexander), NRHP-listed
- Feargus O'Connor Willden House, 120 E. 1st South, Beaver, Utah (Boyter, James), NRHP-listed
