= Abraham and Mary Walton Hogeland House =

Historic house in Montana, United States

- U.S. National Register of Historic Places
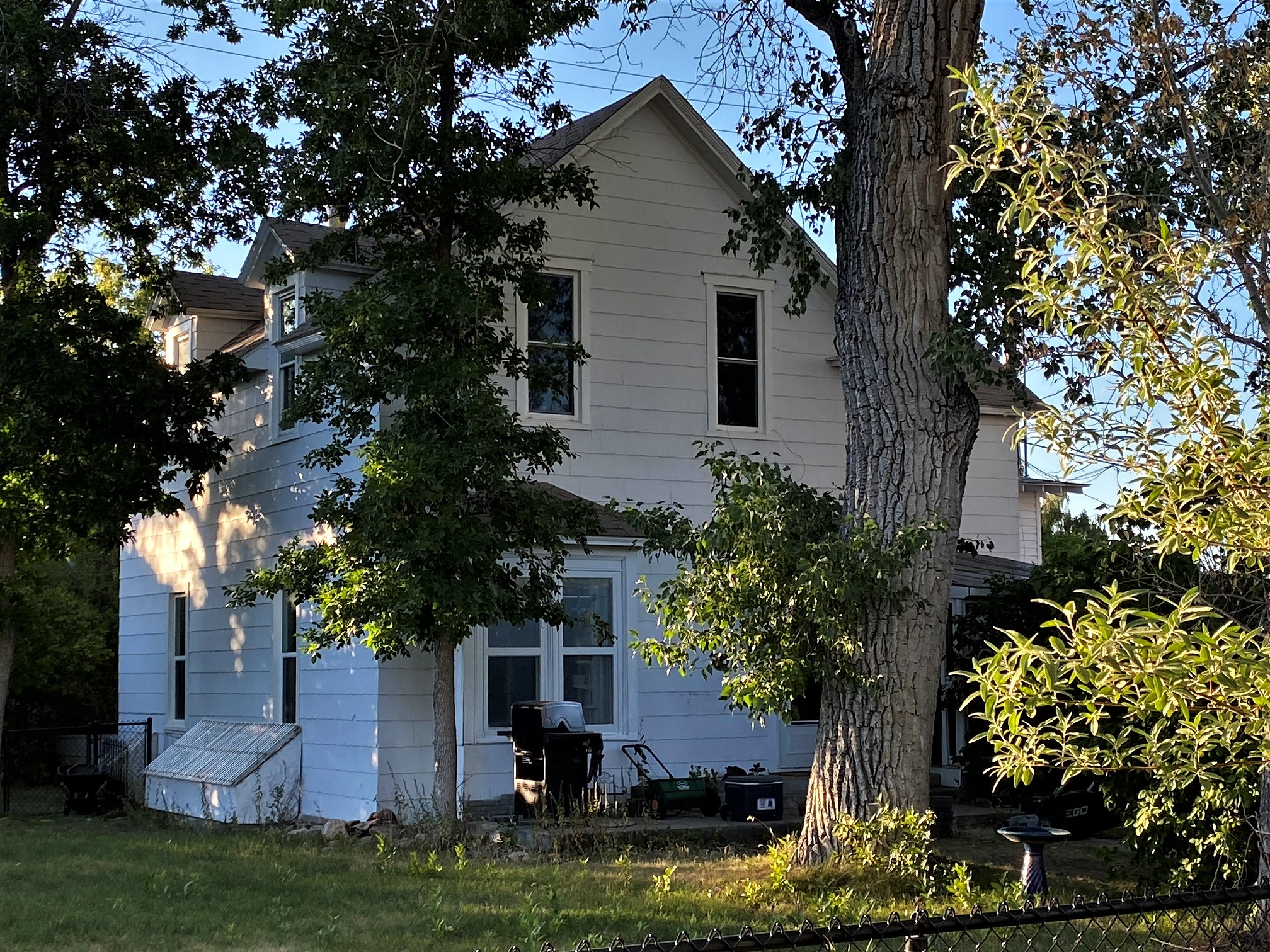

- Location within Montana Location within the United States
- Location: 620 W. Montana St. Lewistown, Montana
- Coordinates: 47°03′55″N 109°25′57″W
- Area: less than one acre
- Built: c. 1900
- Built by: William Cruse
- Architectural style: Late Victorian, Folk Victorian
- MPS: Lewistown MRA
- NRHP reference No.: 07000465
- Added to NRHP: May 24, 2007

The Abraham and Mary Walton Hogeland House, at 620 W. Montana St. in Lewistown, Montana, was built in c. 1900. It has also been known as the Frank and OlaMay Hogeland House. It was listed on the National Register of Historic Places in 2007.

It is an L-shaped two-story building with a gable-front and wing, and an intersecting gable roof. It was originally covered with wood clapboard, but front and sides were covered with asbestos shingle siding in 1942. It has boxed eaves, with full gable returns and raking molding. It occupies a corner lot; its gable front faces southeast onto W. Montana St.; its southwest side is along 7th Ave. The southwest side has two dormers breaking the roofline, and another dormer faces southeast from the wing which extends to the northeast. A c. 1945 wood-frame garage is directly behind the house, relative to the street corner, connecting at the north corner of the house. (Note: The garage was built by Frank Hogeland, son of Abraham and Mary. The NRHP nomination mentions the garage as a two-story c.1945 building on its second page, and the c.1945 date is supported on page 5, although the garage is described as a one-and-a-half-story building constructed c.1960 on page 6.)

The building originally served as the Fort Maginnis Bachelor Officer's Quarters, at Fort Maginnis, which closed in the late 1800s. Abraham Hogeland bought this and another one of its buildings, dismantled them, and had them reconstructed in Lewistown in 1900.

The house reflects the Hogeland's decision to move to town from their ranch, and was deemed significant as a representation of local trends. Specifically "the property is representative of the transition of Lewistown from a trading post to thriving social, economic, and civil center." Also, the "historic alterations in design and materials to the building are significant representations of economic and design trends through the first half of the twentieth century."

It is Late Victorian in style. It was built by carpenter William Cruse.

A historic plaque was placed on the sidewalk in front of the house in 2013.
