= Amud Uwe Millies =

German painter

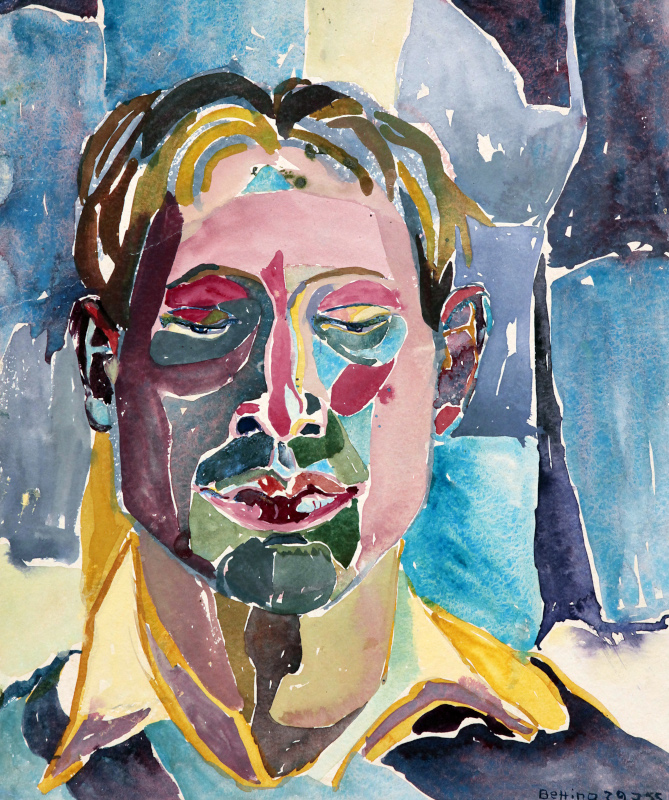
Portrait of Amud Uwe Millies in the Solingen artists’ colony, painted by Bettina Heinen-Ayech, 1955, watercolor on paper

Amud Uwe Millies (January 7, 1932 – November 10, 2008) was a German artist associated with late Expressionism. He became known for his paintings created during extensive travels, which depict nature, architecture, and people’s ways of life. He was an active member of the Solingen artists’ colony known as the Black House, a group founded after World War II that consisted of his mentor Erwin Bowien, Bettina Heinen-Ayech, and himself.

== Early life and education ==
Uwe Millies was born in Hamburg as Uwe Millies, the son of Johannes Max Millies, who had established a bottle cap manufacturing company in Hamburg-Wandsbek. The family's ancestors came from Emilia-Romagna in Italy and migrated to Protestant Mecklenburg after the Reformation. His father’s pacifist and anti-militarist stance, along with his Hanseatic merchant values, strongly shaped Millies’ character. His mother, Elsbeth Anne Marie (née Neven), combined Northern German roots from her father, a ship’s engineer who traveled the world, and the artisan legacy of her grandfather Friedrich Wilhelm Stock from Eisenach, a ducal armorer.

From 1939 to 1946, the family took refuge on a farm near Holzkirchen in Upper Bavaria, escaping the bombing of Hamburg during WWII. In 1946, they returned to the devastated city. Millies attended high school from 1946 to 1950 and began painting trips in 1949 to Bavaria and Sylt, where he met painter Bettina Heinen-Ayech and his lifelong teacher and friend Erwin Bowien. Bowien’s influence sparked Uwe’s desire to paint outdoors in nature, and his early works reflect Bowien's style.

In 1953, he earned a journeyman’s certificate in mechanical engineering from the Hamburg Chamber of Commerce, complying with the wishes of his parents, who had planned for him to join the family business.

== Career ==
From 1955 to 1967, he lived and worked in the Black House artists’ colony in Solingen with Heinen-Ayech and Bowien.

During this time, he undertook numerous long painting trips across Germany and abroad – including France, the Netherlands, Denmark, Norway, Switzerland, Italy, and Yugoslavia. In 1961, his daughter, Diana Millies, was born.

In 1973, Millies left Europe for the first time and painted in Turkey. Following a trip to Egypt, he adopted the name Amud Uwe Millies. Many further journeys followed – some lasting several months. He saw himself as a preserver of the cultures he visited, frequently depicting cities and cultural landmarks as a form of documentation. One particularly evocative cycle is titled "Execution of a Barn", comprising ten pastel works showing the demolition of a medieval barn near Bad Oldesloe. In 1974, Millies purchased the so-called Swiss House at Tralau Castle near Bad Oldesloe.

His painting travels continued throughout Germany and abroad until his death, including trips to Yugoslavia (1972), Turkey (1973), Denmark (1977), Norway (1979), Mallorca (1980), Nepal (1982), Egypt, Denmark, and Norway (1984), Sri Lanka and Norway (1986), Bali (1987), France (1988), Gran Canaria (1989), Nepal (1990), Spain and India (1991), Peru and Alaska (1992), Ecuador and Peru (1993), Egypt and Mexico (1994), Nepal (1995), Peru (1997), Russia and Greece (1998), Denmark (1999), Greece (2001), Tunisia (2002), South Africa (2003), Tunisia (2004), Turkey and Greece (2006), Portugal (2007), and finally once again to Greece in 2008.

Amud Uwe Millies died on November 10, 2008 in his home in Hamburg (Germany). Alongside his artworks, he left behind many letters and travel journals, documenting and often critically reflecting on the transition from traditional rural societies to modernity

== Art ==
Millies worked with oil paints, pastels, and watercolors. Furthermore, he created graphic art, drawings and sketches, ceramic tiles, and pottery. In an era dominated by abstraction, Millies pursued a figurative style rooted in late Expressionism. His subjects were drawn from his travels – landscapes, cityscapes, architecture, portraits, and paintings of flowers. He was a proponent of bright, luminous plein air painting – often painting in the open air, akin to artists from colonies in Fontainebleau, Ahrenshoop, or Dachau.

Luisa Reiblich noted in her essay “A Global Seeker and an Expressionist on Perpetual Travel” that Millies had a distinctive technique, applying oil paint in a delicate and thin manner to achieve a soft coloration. At first glance, his works often appear to be pastels, though most are in fact oil paintings.

His artistic vision was shaped by a longing for international dialogue, which he sought and found on his travels. Millies saw himself as a global citizen – a perspective that deeply shaped his art and remains strikingly relevant today.

== Exhibitions (selection) ==
Since the late 1950s, his artistic work has been presented in numerous solo and group exhibitions, both within Germany and internationally. His exhibitions span a wide geographical range, including venues across Europe and beyond. The breadth of his exhibition history is notably documented in the catalog accompanying the Dachau exhibition of 2025.

Key museum exhibitions include:

- 1957: Nordfriesland Museum Nissenhaus, Husum
- 1958: Städtisches Museum, Hannoversch-Münden
- 1967 Solingen, Deutsches Klingenmuseum, together with Emma Stern und Alfred Wrabetz
- 1982 Kathmandu (Nepal), Nationalgalerie
- 1985: Torhaus Wellingsbüttel, Hamburg
- 1986: National Museum of Kandy, Sri Lanka
- 2025: Gemäldegalerie Dachau (together with Bettina Heinen-Ayech und Erwin Bowien)
- 2025: Museum Villa Stahmer, Georgsmarienhütte (together with Bettina Heinen-Ayech und Erwin Bowien)
