= Black Building =

Black Building may refer to:

- Black Building (Fargo, North Dakota), listed on the National Register of Historic Places (NRHP) in Cass County
- H. Black and Company Building, Cleveland, Ohio, NRHP-listed in Cleveland
- A. H. Black and Company Building, Myrtle Point, Oregon, NRHP-listed in Coos County

== See also ==
- Black Building Workers Act, 1951, also known as "Native Building Workers Act, 1951", legislation of South Africa
- Black House (disambiguation)
