= James Atkins =

James Atkins may refer to:

- James Atkins (baseball) (1921–2009), American baseball pitcher
- James Atkins (offensive tackle) (born 1970), American football offensive tackle
- James Atkins (defensive tackle) (born 1978), American football defensive tackle
- James Atkins (nurseryman) (1804–1884), known for being a galanthophile
- James Atkins (artist) (born 1978), American artist

== See also ==
- James Atkin, Baron Atkin (1867–1944), British lawyer and judge
- James Atkin, British musician in the band EMF
- James Atkin House, a historic home in Beaver, Utah, U.S.
- Jim Adkins, American musician in the band Jimmy Eat World
