= Baandam Museum =

Private art museum in Chiang Rai, Thailand

Baandam museum
- บ้านดำ
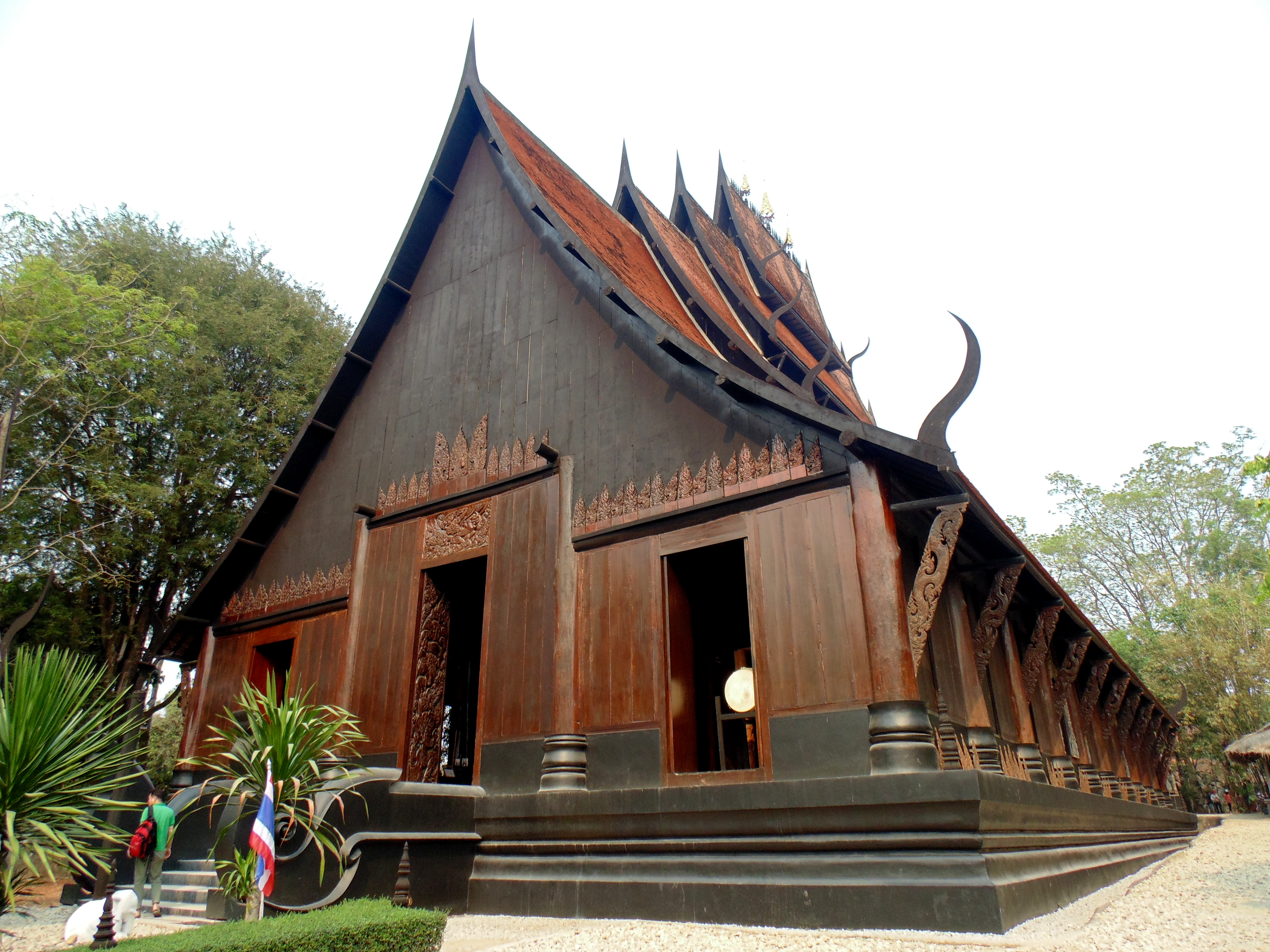

Religion
- Affiliation: Theravada Buddhism
- Province: Chiang Rai

Location
- Location: Mueang Chiang Rai, Chiang Rai, Thailand
- Interactive map of Baandam museum
- Coordinates: 19.9921°N 99.8607°E

Architecture
- Architect: Thawan Duchanee
- Style: Thai Modern Architecture; Lanna Architecture
- Founder: Thawan Duchanee
- Completed: 1996

Website
- thawan-duchanee.com

Baandam Museum (Thai: พิพิธภัณฑ์บ้านดำ, RTGS: ban dam, lit. 'black house'), also known in English as the Black House Museum, is a private art museum comprising a mixture of traditional northern Thai buildings with unconventional and contemporary architecture, designed by Thawan Duchanee.

== History ==
Since 1975, Baan Dam Museum has been constantly curated for more than 40 years. Many art institutes in Thailand and overseas have offered scholarships to researchers who have lived near Baan Dam for the past 25 years.

== Buildings ==
The museum covers an area of about 160,000 square meters, consisting of over 40 different structures scattered around the site. Each building has its own unique name and the.

=== Cathedral ===
The Cathedral (Art Museum Building; Thai: มหาวิหาร), was designed by Thawan Duchanee and built by Baan Dam's engineers in 1999 - 2009. It took 7 years to build. The inspiration of the cathedral is the combination of wood cultures such as form, shape, philosophy etc. with contemporary creativity, Buddhist art and modern architecture. The purpose of the cathedral is for activities such as drawing and recalling the doctrine of Buddhism.

The cathedral is a large single-story rectangular building with an east-west alignment, raised from the ground about 2.8 meters on brick. The structure is wood with Thai style decor named Bua pattern at the base each of 44 large wooden pillars. The roof is steeply pitched with four-tiers in Lanna style covered with unglazed clay tiles and decorated with Thai and Lanna features such as swan tail (Thai:หางหงส์), balalee (Thai:บราลี), tiered (Thai:ฉัตร), and There are three large doors at the east and west ends with stairs leading up to them. The side is a sliding door. The building is 20.30 meters wide, 44 meters long and 44 meters high. The interior has exhibits of various forms of visual arts created by Thawan Duchanee.

=== Small temple ===
The small temple, also designed by Thawan Duchanee, was built in 1992. It took a year and a half to build. The inspiration of the small temple is a combination of Lanna Thai style such as Thai Yai wood carving (Thai: ไม้แกะสลักไทยใหญ่), indigenous terracotta roof (Thai: หลังคาดินขอพื้นเมือง), tiered roof(Thai: ลดชั้น), tiered (Thai:ฉัตร), balalee(Thai:บราลี), and gable apex(ช่อฟ้า). It is a rectangular building on an east–west axis with 6 wooden pillars and has stairs on both the east and west sides. To set the landscape of a small temple leading to the cathedral.

The small temple is a one-story building raised from the ground about 1 meter based on mortar. The building structure is wooden with 6 pillars. The small temple has a triangular roof with a four-tiers of Lanna style covered with an indigenous terracotta roof and decorated in Thai and Lanna style with swan tail(Thai:หางหงส์), balalee(Thai:บราลี), tiered(Thai:ฉัตร), and There are two doors on east and west, and the sides have 2 windows. The Small Temple is 2.34 meters wide, 5.20 meters long and 9.34 meters high. Inside there is a carved wooden Buddha and the arch is in Thai and Burmese style.

=== East pavilion ===
The east pavilion was also designed by Thawan Duchanee and built in 1994. It took 1 year to build. The inspiration of the east pavilion is the mansard Thai Lanna style roof. It is a rectangular building with an east–west axis, and has multiple purposes including a guest room.

The east pavilion is a one-story building on a mortar base. The structure is in wood with 6 pillars. The east pavilion uses glass instead of a wall, and has a triangular mansard Lanna style roof covered with indigenous terracotta tiles. It is 3.60 meters wide, 5.60 meters long, and 9.00 meters high. Inside there is one large wooden table of 3 x 2 meters, and displays of indigenous art, indigenous hill tribe instruments, etc.

=== Tri Phum (Triangle House) ===
Tri Phum, (ไตรภูมิ), was constructed in 1976 - 1977, formed a triangle shape on January 1, 1977. It took a total of seven years to build and restore because it was destroyed three times by storms. The building is triangular, laid along the east–west axis. There are terraces on both sides and stairs to go up and down. 2 sides are east and west, with 25 wooden pillars supporting the entire building structure and 6 pillars supporting the front and back decks. For creating a medium-sized figure. This building is the source of all Thawan Duchanee's paintings in museums across the world. It's also utilized as a writer's and student's apartment.

It is a single-story building raised about 1.80 meters from the ground. The building has all wooden structure supported by wooden pillars. The roof is triangular with pan-kled wood.{{clarify}pan-kled?}} The top is next to the Galae below is decorated with a swan's tail. There is a large door on two sides. It has windows on both sides top light glass. The inside is divided into three parts. There are two bedrooms and one central utility room for general use.

== Visiting ==
The museum is open to the public.

== Gallery ==
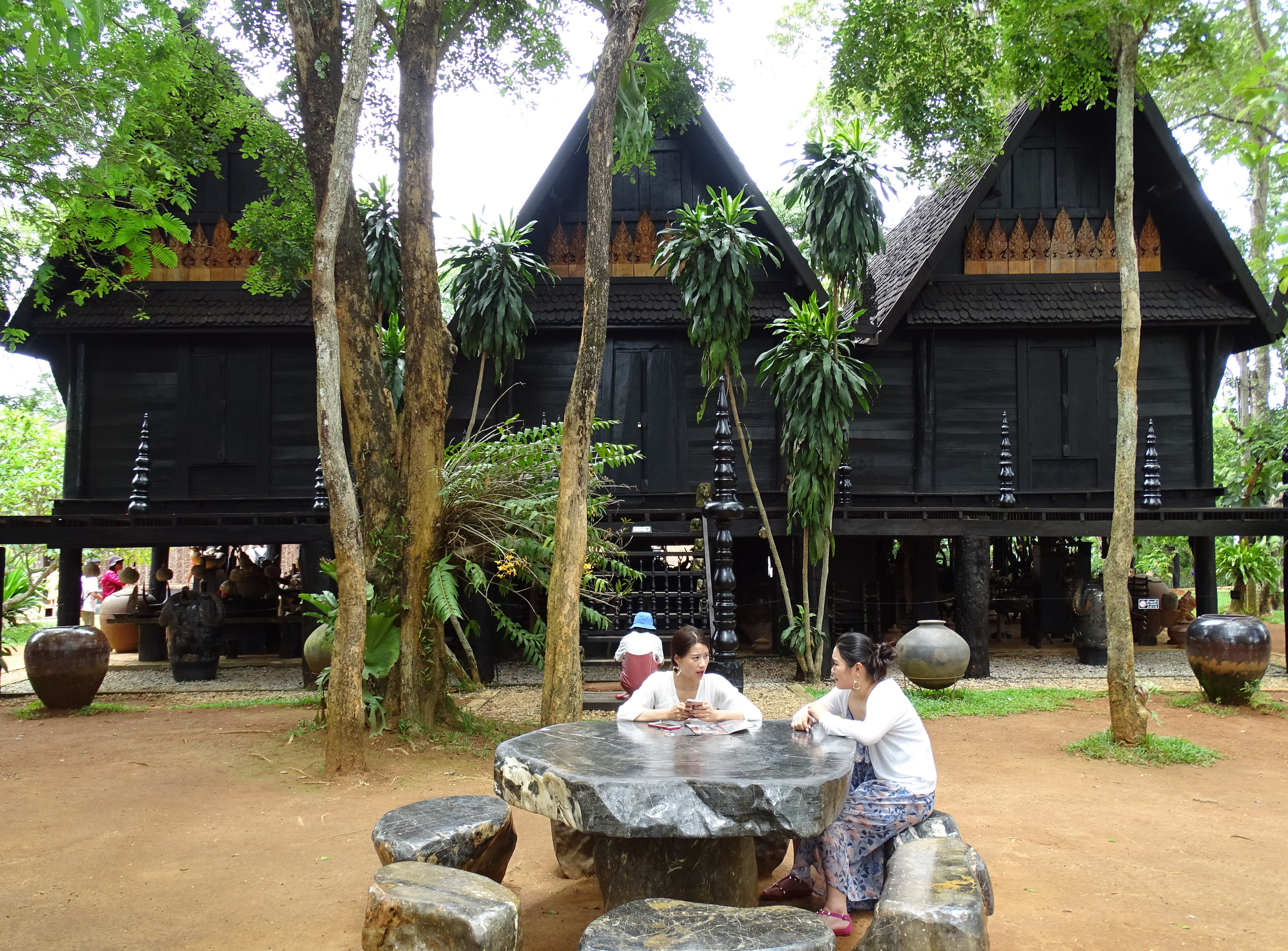

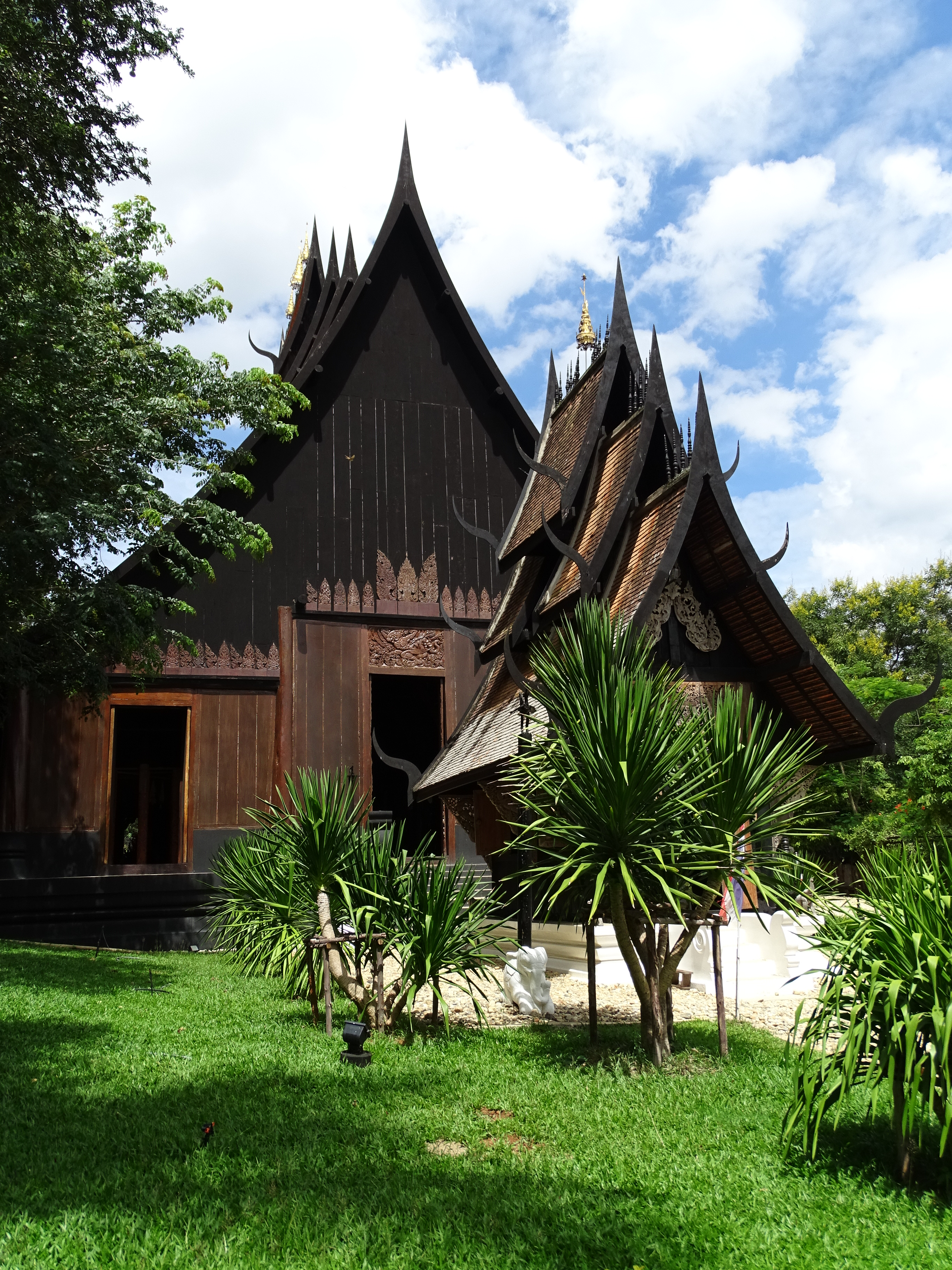

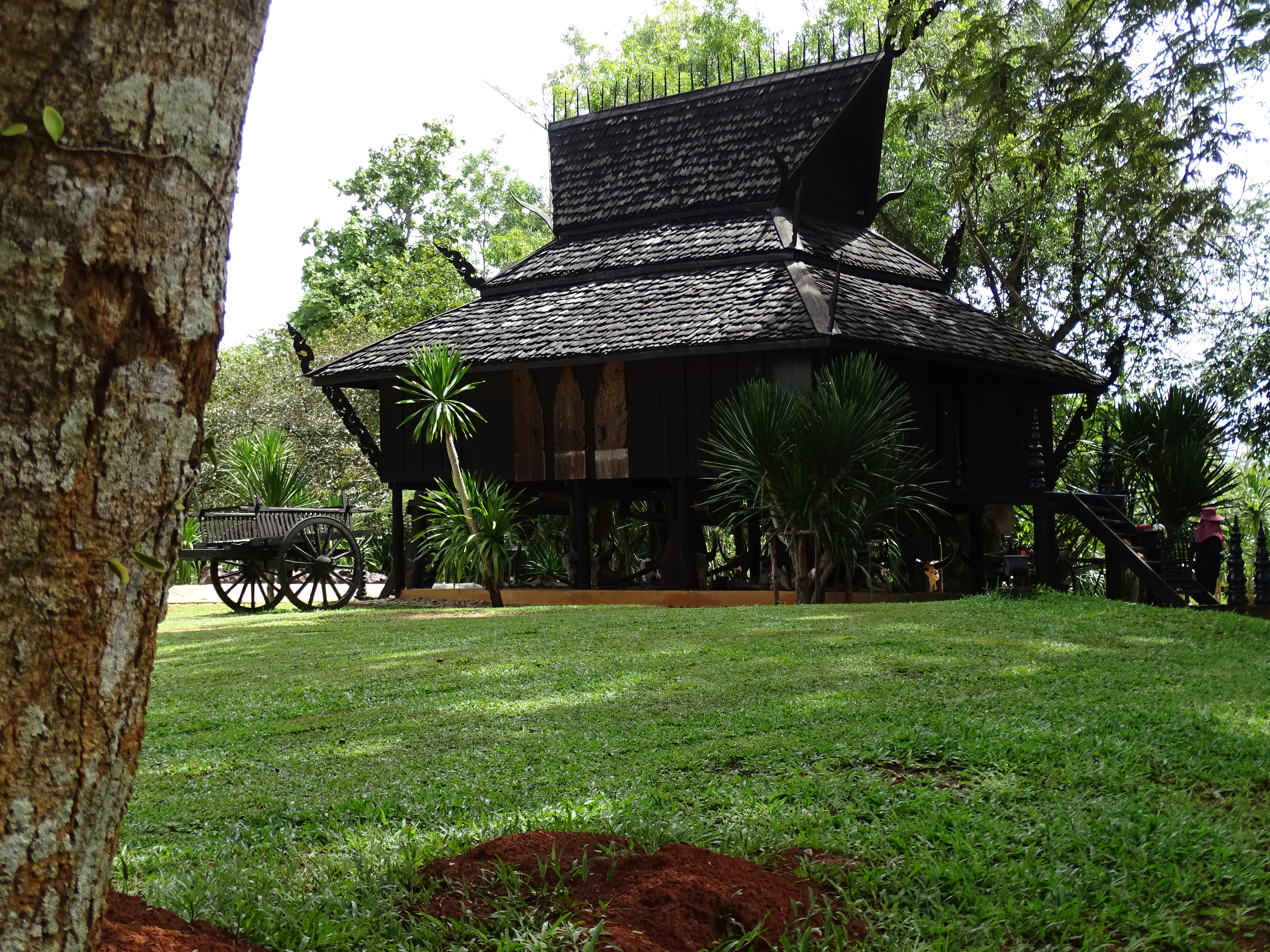

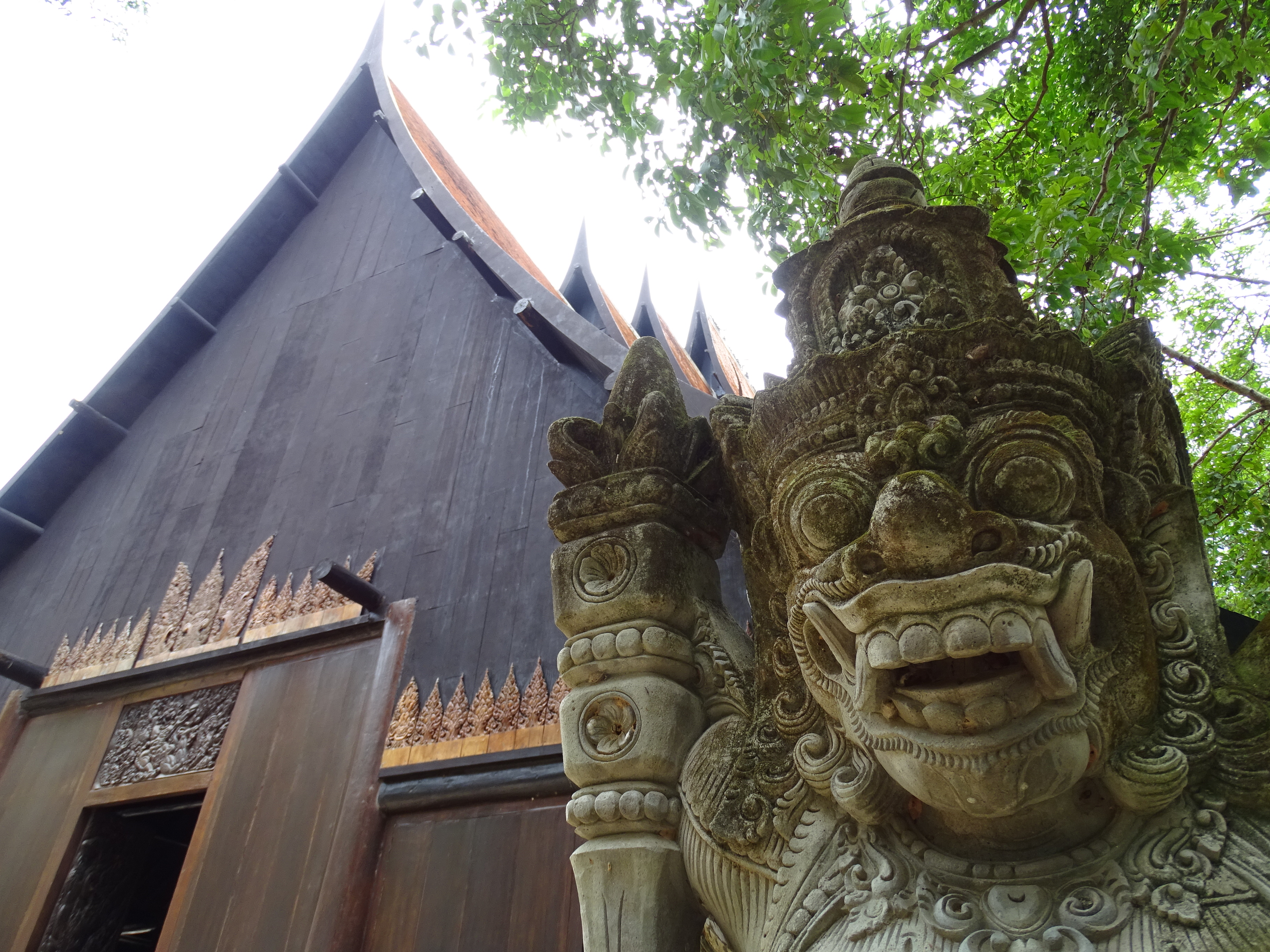

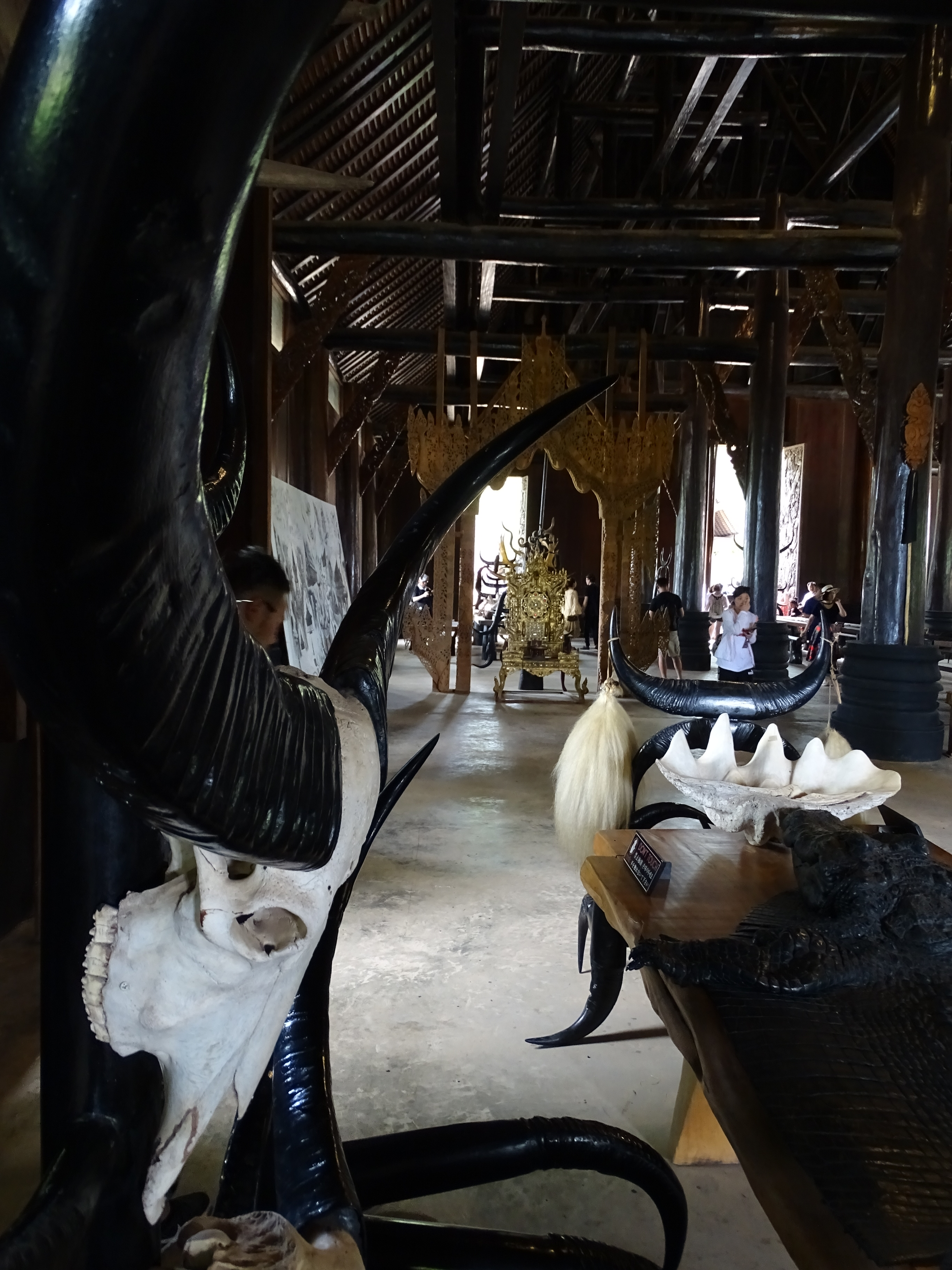

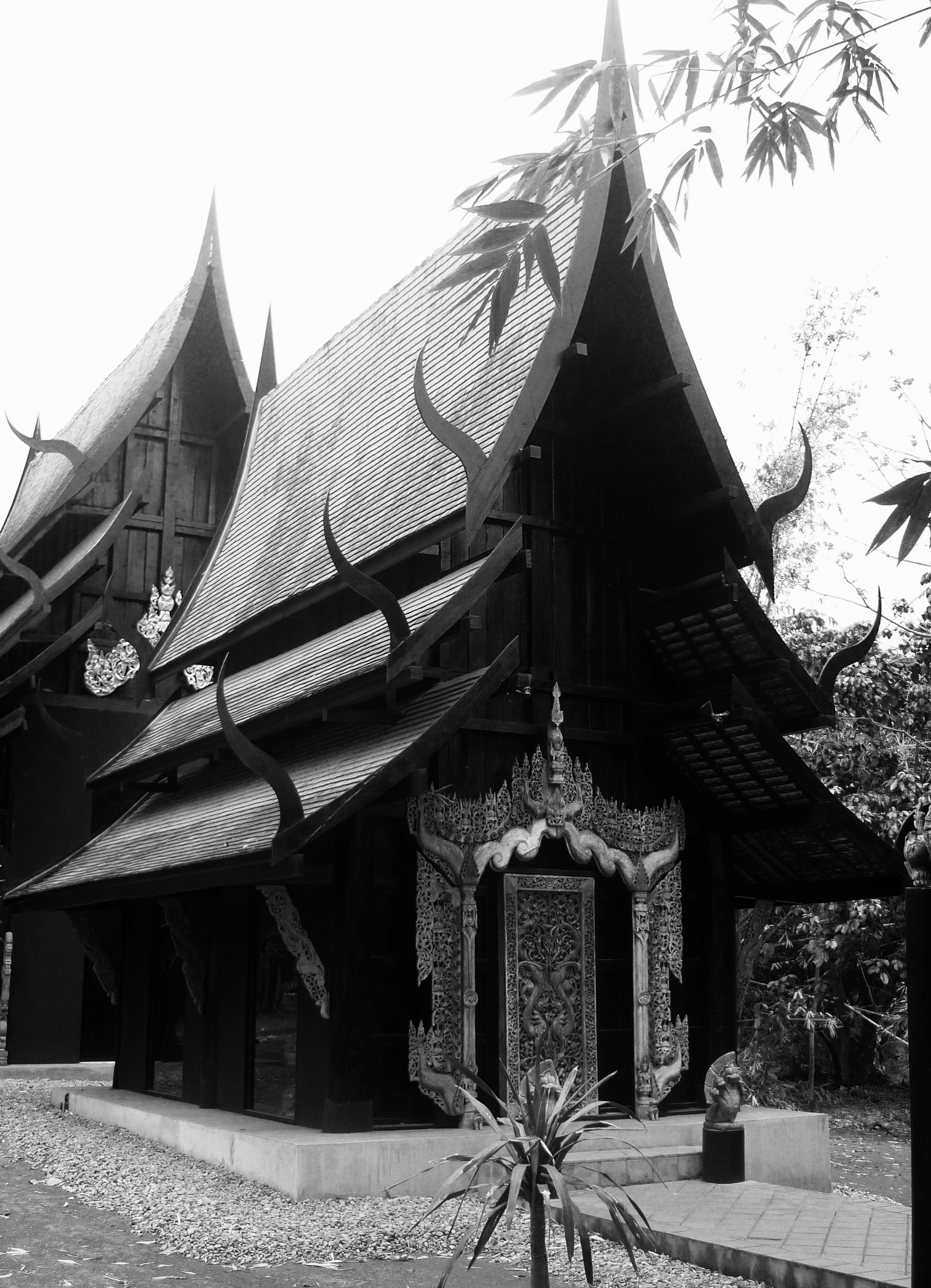
