= Erickson House =

- U.S. National Register of Historic Places
- Erickson House, Beaver, UT
- Location within Utah Location within the United States
- Location: 290 N. 300 West, Beaver, Utah
- Coordinates: 38°16′38″N 112°38′42″W
- Area: less than one acre
- Built: c.1900
- Built by: Alexander Boyter
- MPS: Beaver MRA
- NRHP reference No.: 82004084
- Added to NRHP: September 17, 1982

The Erickson House, at 290 N. 300 West in Beaver, Utah, was built around 1900. It was listed on the National Register of Historic Places in 1982.

It is a one-and-a-half-story black rock cottage which was built by Alexander Boyter.
