= Alexander Boyter House =

Historic house in Utah, United States

- U.S. National Register of Historic Places
- Location within Utah Location within the United States
- Location: 590 N. 200 West, Beaver, Utah
- Coordinates: 38°16′54″N 112°38′36″W
- Area: less than one acre
- Built: 1882
- Built by: Boyter, Alexender
- MPS: Beaver MRA
- NRHP reference No.: 83004393
- Added to NRHP: April 15, 1983

The Alexander Boyter House at 590 N. 200 West, Beaver, Utah was built in 1882 by Alexander Boyter and was his home. It was expanded twice. According to a 1979 historic site evaluation of the house, the stonework in its original construction is "fabulous".

The house was listed on the National Register of Historic Places in 1983.
