= James Boyter House =

Historic place in Utah, United States

- U.S. National Register of Historic Places
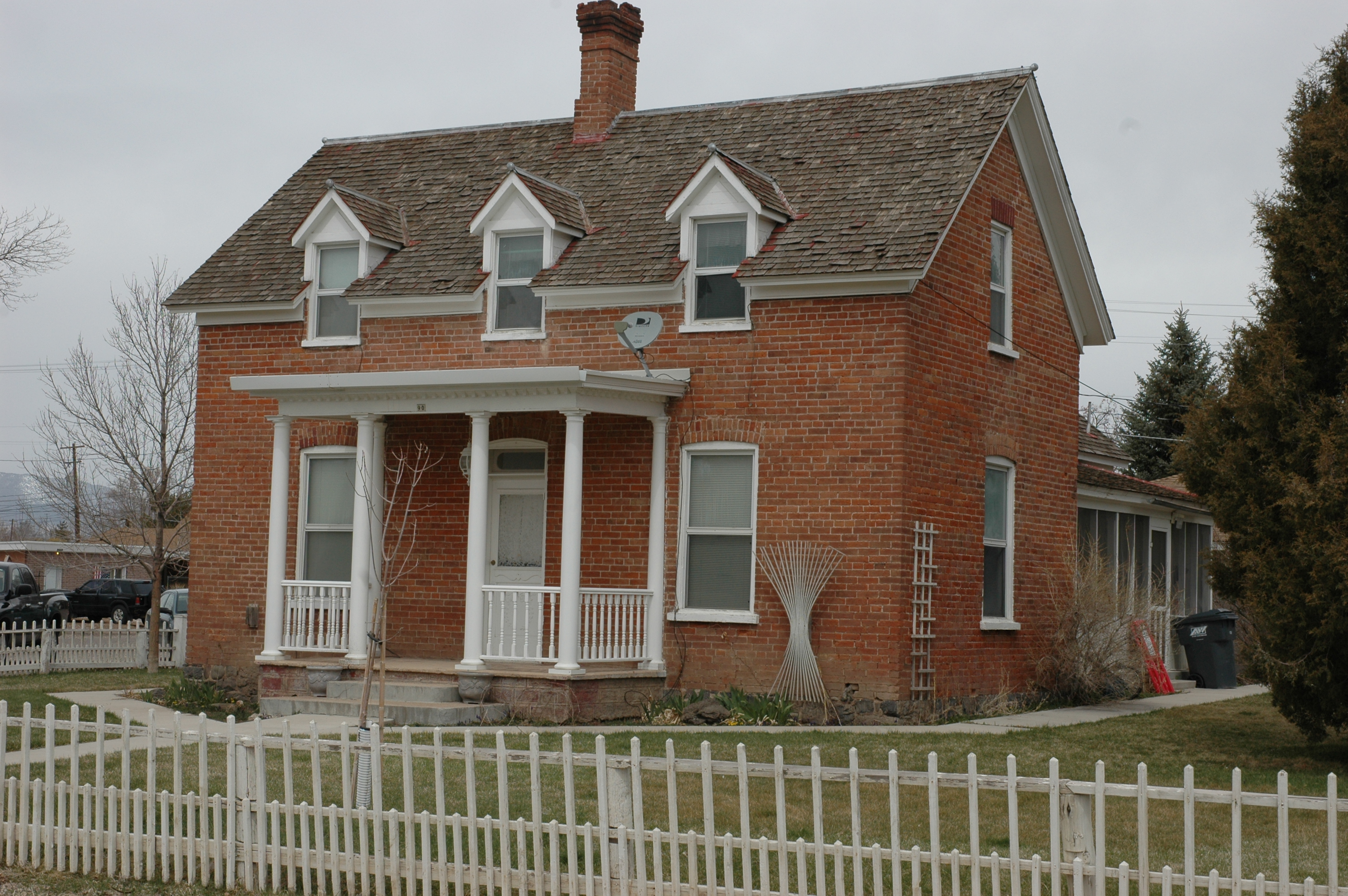

- Location within Utah Location within the United States
- Location: 90 W. 200 North, Beaver, Utah
- Coordinates: 38°16′38″N 112°38′29″W
- Area: less than one acre
- Built: 1883
- Built by: James Boyter
- MPS: Beaver MRA
- NRHP reference No.: 83004394
- Added to NRHP: April 15, 1983

The James Boyter House, at 90 W. 200 North in Beaver, Utah, was built in 1883. It was listed on the National Register of Historic Places in 1983.

It is a 1 1/2-story house with three dormer windows.

It was built by James Boyter, a stonemason and brother of Alexander Boyter.

== See also ==
- James Boyter Shop, at 50 W. 200 North, also National Register-listed
