= John Black House =

- U.S. National Register of Historic Places
- Location within Utah Location within the United States
- Location: 595 N. 100 West, Beaver, Utah
- Coordinates: 38°16′06″N 112°38′38″W
- Area: less than one acre
- Built: c.1910
- Built by: Alexander Boyter
- MPS: Beaver MRA
- NRHP reference No.: 82004079
- Added to NRHP: September 17, 1982

The John Black House, at 595 N. 100 West in Beaver, Utah, was built around 1910. It was listed on the National Register of Historic Places in 1982.

It was built as a one-and-a-half-story two-room brick cottage with a hall and parlor plan, and a symmetric window-door-window front. It has an end-wall chimney, and was built on a block rock foundation. The masonry work is "excellent", characteristic of stonemason Alexander Boyter's work.

It has decorative wrought iron roof cresting about the bay window on its south side, which is believed to be the only example in Beaver. It has eaves with a broad cornice and boxed returns in both gable ends.

The house was deemed significant "because of its historic date, its relatively unaltered appearance and its builder. Alexander Boyter built mostly with the pink rock and the brick, and the most common trait amongst all of his homes is the fine masonry work. The style of this home is also interesting because it is most influenced by the traditional vernacular styles in Beaver. However, c. 1910 was a relatively late date to build a house in this style because by then the vernacular building methods and traditional styles were breaking down in Beaver."

Later additions are to the rear and do not detract very much.
