= Alfred L. Black House =

- U.S. National Register of Historic Places
- Location within Washington (state)
- Location: 158 S. Forest St Bellingham, Washington
- Coordinates: 48°44′07″N 122°29′38″W
- Built: 1903
- Architect: Alfred Lee
- Architectural style: Queen Anne
- NRHP reference No.: 80004012
- Added to NRHP: December 4, 1980

The Alfred L. Black House, also known as the Wahl House, is a historic residence located at 158 S. Forest St in Bellingham, Washington. The house was finished in 1903. It consists of four stories and includes 10 bedrooms, six bathrooms, a library, a billiard room, a music room, a ballroom, and a wrap around porch. The interior wood consists of fir. It is approximately 13,500 square feet.

== Background ==
The house was built by Alfred L. Black in 1903. Black was the last mayor of the town of Fairhaven before the city of Bellingham was established in 1903. After a special election to determine the mayor of the new city in December of that year, Alfred Black was voted as the first mayor of Bellingham. The building was designed by Alfred Lee, who also was the architect of the Whatcom Museum of History and Art and the Bellingham Carnegie Public Library.

== History ==
In 1917, the house was bought by J. B Wahl. Whal was the founder of Wahl's Department Store which was located downtown Bellingham until 1972. The house remained in the Wahl family until 1957 when it was sold to the Sisters of St. Joseph, who operated the house as a retreat. While in use by the sisters, the music room was used as a chapel. The basement was also remodeled into a dining room that could hold over 100 people.

The sisters later sold the house to John and Jackie Mumma in 1963. The Mummas lived in the house until about 1978 when it was sold to Floyd and Becky Svensoon The house was added to the National Register of Historic Places on December 4, 1980.

By 2008, the house was owned by Ron Weden. In August 2017, the house was damaged by fire.
