= Henry C. Gale House (495 N. 1st East, Beaver, Utah) =

Historic house in Utah, United States

- U.S. National Register of Historic Places
- Location within Utah Location within the United States
- Location: 495 N. 1st East, Beaver, Utah
- Coordinates: 38°16′48″N 112°38′23″W
- Area: less than one acre
- Built: c. 1889
- Built by: Alexander Boyter
- Architectural style: Greek Revival, Hall and parlor
- MPS: Beaver MRA
- NRHP reference No.: 83003851
- Added to NRHP: November 29, 1983

The Henry C. Gale House at 495 N. 1st East, Beaver, Utah was built in 1889, of pink rock. It has had three additions since its construction. It is believed to have been built by local Scots stonemason Alexander Boyter. It was listed on the National Register of Historic Places in 1983.

Originally it was a one-and-a-half-story hall and parlor plan cottage. It has a Greek Revival-style cornice.

== See also ==
- Henry C. Gale House (500 North)
