= James Boyter Shop =

- Boyter, James, Shop
- U.S. National Register of Historic Places
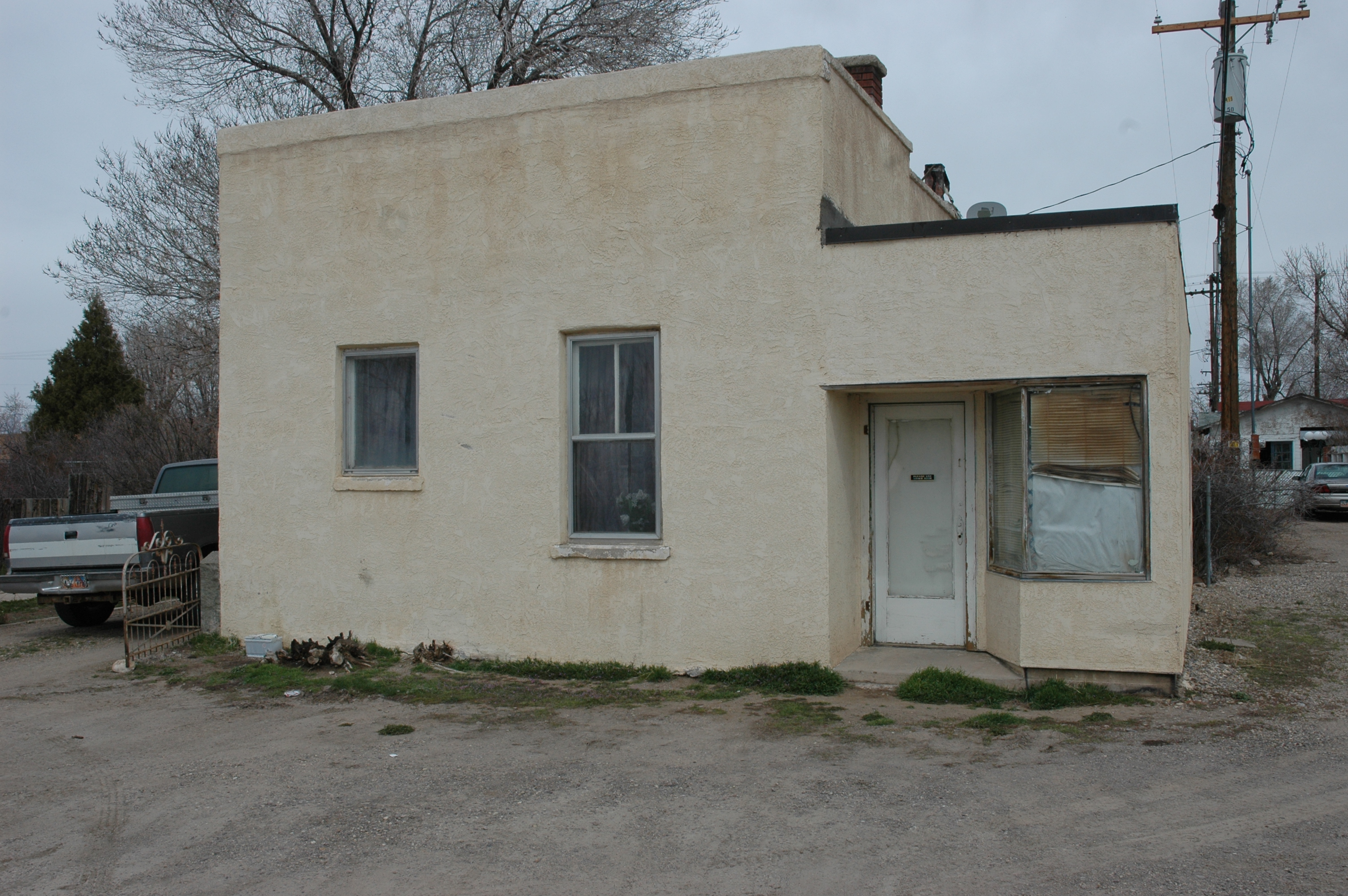
- Location: 50 W. 200 North, Beaver, Utah
- Coordinates: 38°16′38″N 112°38′29″W
- Area: less than one acre
- Built: 1911
- Built by: Boyter, James
- MPS: Beaver MRA
- NRHP reference No.: 83004395
- Added to NRHP: April 15, 1983

The James Boyter Shop, at 50 W. 200 North in Beaver, Utah, was built in 1911. It was listed in the National Register of Historic Places in 1983.

It was originally used as a shop for James Boyter's monument-carving. Boyter was a sculptor and carved headstones for cemeteries in the area, working with pink stone tuff and white marble brought from the mining town of Newhouse, Utah. His works often featured lambs. He also was a stonemason and helped his brother Alexander Boyter in construction work.

== See also ==
- James Boyter House
