= Black-Cole House =

Historic house in North Carolina, United States

- U.S. National Register of Historic Places
- Location within North Carolina Location within the United States
- Location: NW of Eastwood, near Eastwood, North Carolina
- Coordinates: 35°16′3″N 79°29′16″W
- Area: 5 acres (2.0 ha)
- Built: c. 1815
- Built by: Mr. Black
- Architectural style: Greek Revival, Federal
- NRHP reference No.: 78001967
- Added to NRHP: September 18, 1978

The Black-Cole House (also known as the John B. Kelly House) is a historic plantation house located near Eastwood, Moore County, North Carolina.

== Description and history ==
It is dated to about 1815, and is a one-story, four-bay, frame dwelling with Federal/Greek Revival style design elements. The house rests on a brick pier foundation, has a clipped gable roof, and full-width engaged front porch. It has a low, three-bay hip-roof rear wing added in the mid-19th century.

It was added to the National Register of Historic Places on September 18, 1978.
