= James Atkin House =

- U.S. National Register of Historic Places
- Location within Utah Location within the United States
- Location: 260 W. 300 North, Beaver, Utah
- Coordinates: 38°16′43″N 112°38′43″W
- Area: less than one acre
- Built: 1911
- Built by: Boyter, Alexander
- MPS: Beaver MRA
- NRHP reference No.: 82004075
- Added to NRHP: September 17, 1982

The James Atkin House, at 260 W. 300 North in Beaver, Utah, was built in 1911. It was listed on the National Register of Historic Places in 1982.

It is a one-and-a-half-story brick house, with high quality brickwork, upon a foundation of squared black rock. Many of the doorways and windows are surmounted by brick voussoirs.

It was built for James Atkin in 1911, possibly with Atkin's help, with brickwork probably by the Scottish mason Alexander Boyter. It was deemed "architecturally significant because it is an example of a style of building that forms the transition between traditional folk building and the more universal styles of the 20th century. Characteristic of this style are: shingle work in the gable, complete returns of the cornice across the gable, a steeply pitched roof, etc."
