= Benjamin Clayton Black House =

Historic house in Arkansas, United States

- U.S. National Register of Historic Places
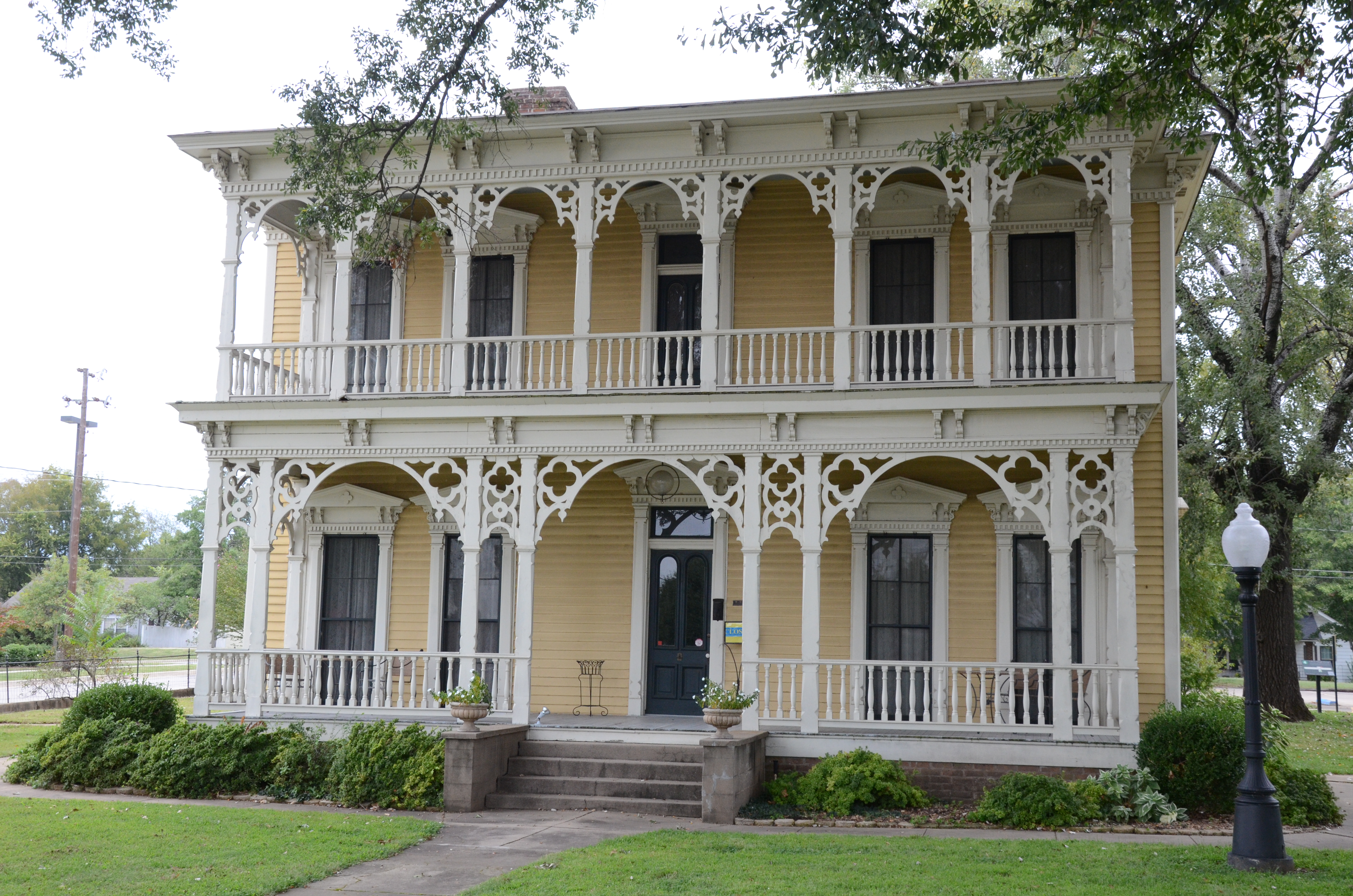

- Location within Arkansas Location within the United States
- Location: 300 E. Race Street, Searcy, Arkansas
- Coordinates: 35°15′36″N 91°44′1″W
- Area: less than one acre
- Built: 1859
- Architectural style: Late Victorian
- NRHP reference No.: 74000505
- Added to NRHP: November 20, 1974

The Benjamin Clayton Black House (also known as the Black House) is a historic house located at 300 East Race Street in Searcy, Arkansas.

== Description and history ==
Built shortly before the American Civil War and extensively updated in 1872, it is one of the earliest examples of Queen Anne architecture surviving in the state. Originally constructed as a single-story two-room structure, it was expanded by the Black family, adding a third room to the rear and a complete second story, and adorning the building with period woodwork. This is most evident in the two-story front porch, which exhibits ornamental latticework, turned posts, and brackets.

The house was listed on the National Register of Historic Places on November 20, 1974.

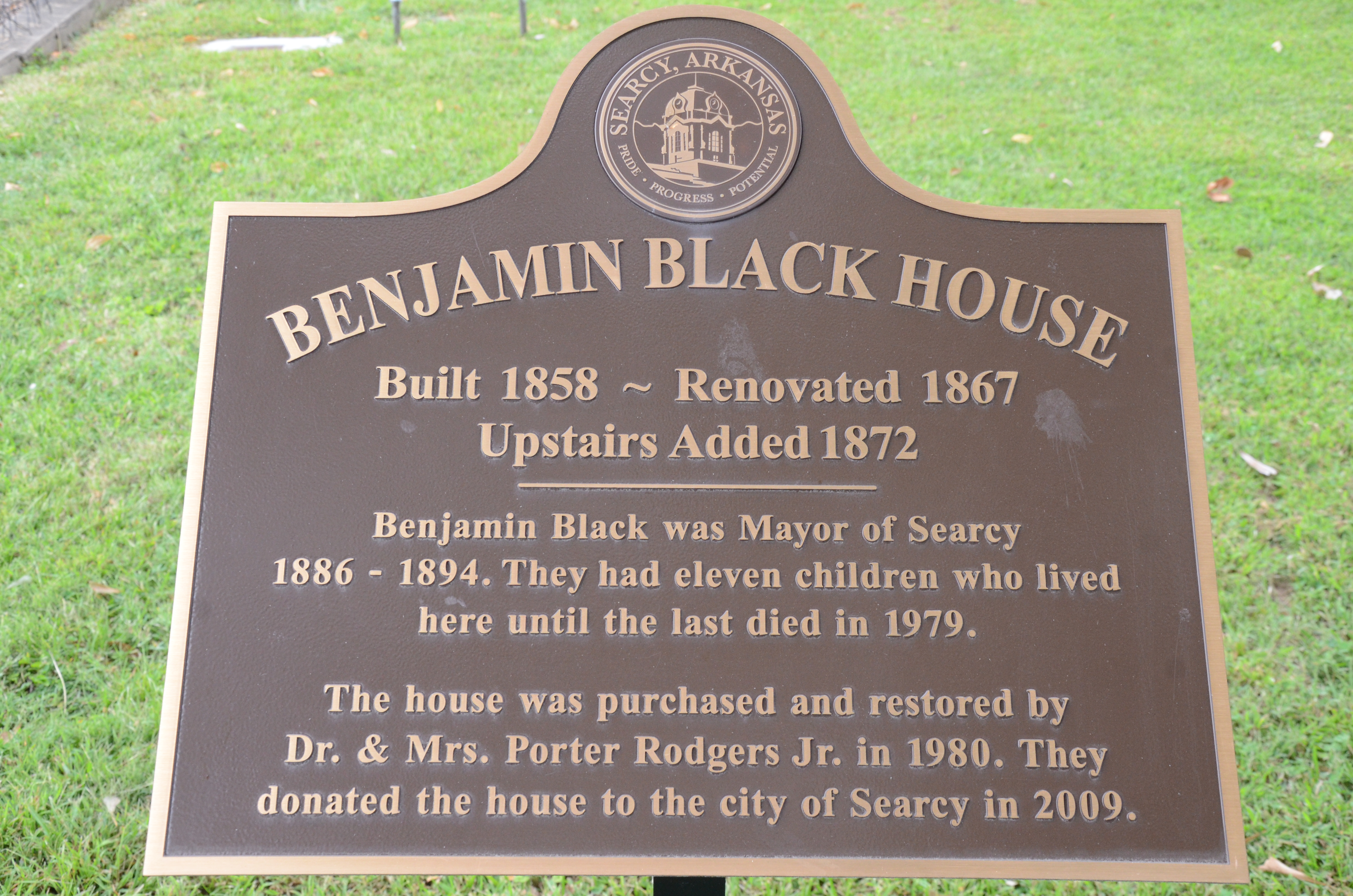
Historical marker on house grounds

== See also ==
- National Register of Historic Places listings in White County, Arkansas
