= Thawan Duchanee =

Thai painter, architect, and sculptor (1939–2014)

- ถวัลย์ ดัชนี
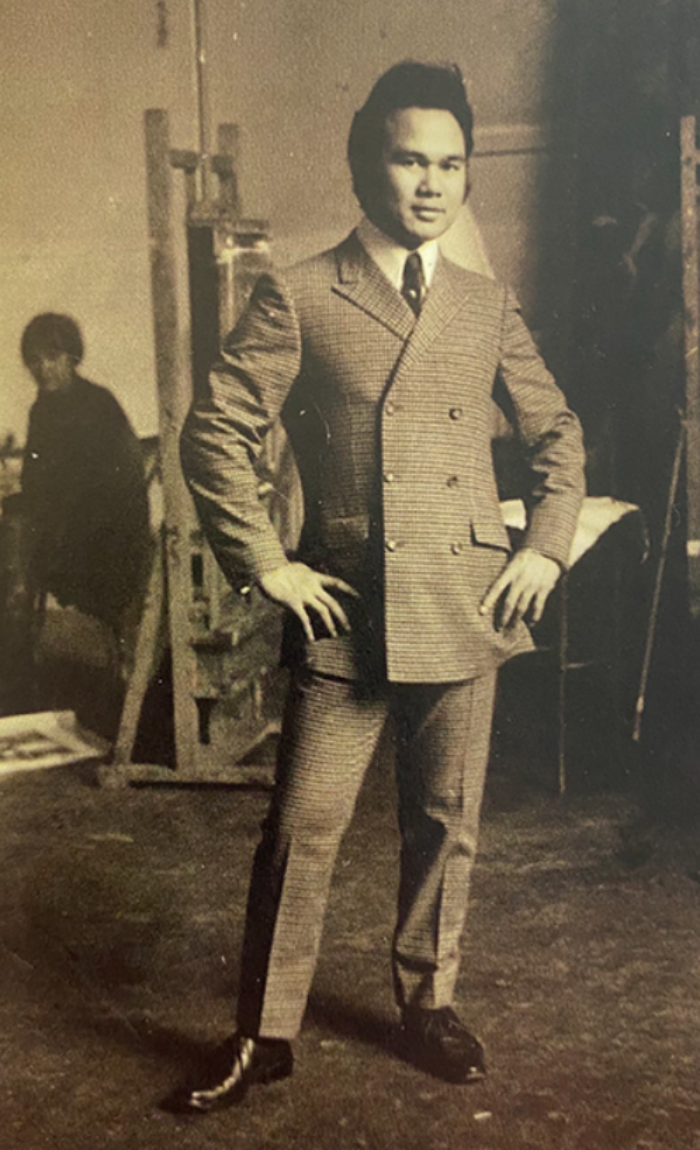
- Thawan circa. 1963 - 69
- Born: September 27, 1939; Chiang Rai, Thailand
- Died: September 3, 2014 (aged 74); Bangkok, Thailand
- Occupations: Painter; architect; sculptor
- Years active: 1939–2014

Thawan Duchanee (Thai: ถวัลย์ ดัชนี; September 27, 1939 – September 3, 2014) was a renowned Thai contemporary painter, architect, and sculptor with an international reputation. In 2001, he was honored by the Office of the National Culture Commission of Thailand as a National Artist in Fine Arts (Visual Arts).

Thawan was born and raised in Chiang Rai, Thailand, and began his art studies at the age of fifteen at the Art and Craft College on a scholarship from the Ministry of Education of Thailand. In 1958, he continued his studies in the Department of Painting, Sculpture, and Graphic Arts at Silpakorn University.

== Biography ==
=== Early life and education ===
Thawan appeared to be a prodigiously gifted artist from childhood. In his youth, he developed a deep and consuming passion for Buddhism, which later became a central influence in his art. However, his attitude toward artistic practice changed significantly during his studies at Silpakorn University, where he belonged to the last generation of students taught by Silpa Bhirasri.

Although Thawan consistently received high grades for his drawing work throughout his university studies, he earned a low grade in Silpa Bhirasri’s drawing class. When questioned, his teacher explained, “Your fish have no fishy smell, your birds cannot fly through the air, and your horses cannot be ridden or made to run. You are merely a copier, not a true artist.”

This critique became a turning point in Thawan’s artistic development. From that moment on, he began working in a radically different way, eventually emerging as one of the most outstanding students of his generation.

=== Illness and death ===
After three months of hospitalizations because of complications from hypertension and diabetes. Thawan died of liver failure on September 3, 2014, at the age of 74.

The funeral was held at Wat Debsirindrawas in Bangkok. The honoured cremation was bestowed by Her Royal Highness Princess Maha Chakri Sirindhorn.

== Work philosophy ==
Buddhist references have played an important role in Thawan’s works. According to one of notable works, a series of Ramayana paintings he presented all of the characters in his own interpretation. Thawan earned a worldwide reputation as a Thai contemporary artist from these buddhist painting.

“Art is beyond nature and intellect” Thawan said. He gave priority to human artistic creativity in artworks.

== Style and media ==
Thawan was the first engraver using a new technique. He used special ballpoint pen to create engravings containing millions of strokes. After working in this way for a while, a doctor suggested him to stop because the way he worked had a disastrous effect on his health.

Thawan also created the painting by Zen brush in order to present a Zen philosophy in artistic form.

The unique characteristic of Thawan’s painting including not only form and religious story but also the colour he used. After learning about Chinese, Indian and Japanese artworks which characteristic is monochrome painting, He was inspired to paint in black and white in order to precisely express inner feelings.

Thawan is not only famous for his paintings but also architecture. His architectural masterpiece is the Black House. It was the residence for Thawan for the rest of his life.

== List of major works ==
=== Paintings ===
- The Dhammapada
- The Battle of Mara
- The Last Ten Lives of the Buddha
- Seeing what is Visible

=== Buildings ===
- Buddhist Meditation Room
- The Biggest Work of the Painter is not a Painting

== Critical responses ==
His artworks are not widely accepted in the first place. A group of student demonstration destroyed his works because they considered them as religious insults. His paintings, however, eventually are mastered and valued as can be seen nowadays.

His artworks has been compared with the artworks of Chalermchai Kositpipat, a fellow-Chiang Rai junior artist. There is a saying "Chalerm Sawan, Thawan Narok" (เฉลิมสวรรค์ ถวัลย์นรก; "Chalerm the Heaven, Thawan the Hell"), because Chalermchai's works focus on elevating the mind, cleanliness, Buddhism or spiritual stories. While Thawan's works are powerful, focusing on the dark side or passion in the human mind.
