= Bettina Heinen-Ayech =

German artist (1937–2020)

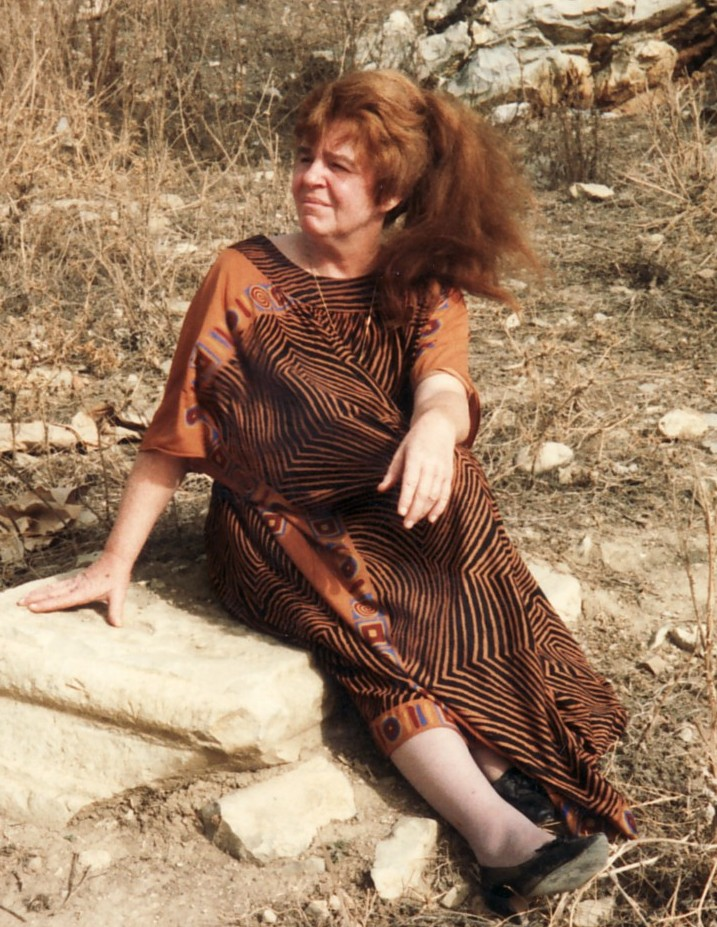
- Bettina Heinen-Ayech in Algeria, 1989
- Born: 3 September 1937; Solingen, Free State of Prussia, Nazi Germany
- Died: 7 June 2020 (aged 82); München, Bavaria, Germany
- Occupation: painter

Bettina Heinen-Ayech (3 September 1937 – 7 June 2020) was a German painter. She became known for her colorful landscape views of Algeria. Between 1955 and 2017 she had many exhibitions worldwide and won several prizes. Heinen-Ayech died on 7 June 2020.

== Biography ==
Bettina Heinen was the daughter of Johann Jakob Josef "Hanns" Heinen (1895–1961), a journalist born in Bauchem, Germany. For many years he was editor-in-chief of the Solinger Tageblatt and the industry newspaper Eberswalder Offertenblatt. He was also active as a lyricist and playwright. Her mother Erna Steinhoff-Heinen (1898–1969), was born in Düsseldorf and came from a Westphalian family from the Soest area. Bettina Heinen had three siblings, two brothers and a sister; the children grew up in a Solingen, Germany home characterized by art and openness. The family lived in an old half-timbered house in the district of Höhscheid, former pit for a lead mine there, which Heinen continued to live in during stays in her hometown until her old age.

During World War II, Bettina Heinen lived with her mother and sister in Kreuzthal-Eisenbach near Isny in Allgäu from 1942, later joined by the painter and family friend Erwin Bowien (1899–1972), who had returned to Germany in 1942 after a ten-year stay in the Netherlands and was on constant flight from Nazi authorities. Her father Hanns Heinen followed in 1944, after publishing an article on the real state of Germany. Warrants for him and Bowien arrest arrived in Kreuzthal, which "tore the postmistress apart," as Heinen later said.

From 1948 to 1954, Bettina went to Solingen's August Dicke Girls' High School, where a teacher recognized and encouraged her talent. She received her first artistic training from Bowien, who remained her mentor until his death.[3] From 1954 she visited the Cologne Werkschulen and there Otto Gerster's class for monumental mural painting, during which she was given three preliminary classes. In 1955 works by Bettina Heinen - 20 watercolors and drawings - were exhibited for the first time in the Kursaal in Bad Homburg. Paintings by the then 18-year-old Bettina Heinen were included by the Frankfurt gallery owner Hanna Bekker vom Rath in the group exhibition Deutsche Kunst der Gegenwart (1955/56), in which they were shown alongside artworks by Karl Schmidt-Rottluff, Paul Klee, Max Beckmann, Max Ernst, Ernst Ludwig Kirchner, and Käthe Kollwitz on a tour to South America, Africa, and Asia. Schmidt-Rottluff advised her, "Bettina, stay true to yourself!"

This was followed by studies with Hermann Kaspar at the Munich Art Academy and journey to Ticino in Switzerland. From 1958 Bettina studied at the Royal Danish Academy of Art in Copenhagen and made the first of several trips to Norway, where she bought a hut at the foot of the Seven Sisters. In 1959 and 1962 Bettina Heinen received grants from the Ministry of Culture of Nordrhein-Westfalen. This was followed by painting stays on Sylt, in Ticino and Norway, as well as in Paris. In 1962 Bettina Heinen made her first trip to North Africa, when she was invited to Cairo by the German Cultural Institute. She was also invited to the German Cultural Institute in Cairo.

In Paris, Bettina met her future husband, the Algerian Abdelhamid Ayech (1926–2010), at the Jardin du Luxembourg in 1960, when she was there painting with Bowien. Two years after the birth of daughter Diana in 1961, the family moved to Guelma, Ayech's hometown in Algeria, which had since become independent from France. Her Son Haroun was born in 1969. In the decades that followed, Bettina Heinen-Ayech switched between Solingen and Algeria, where she became a familiar sight in search of subjects in her car, "a vehicle that was once a R4," with "the inevitable cigarette holder in the corner of her mouth." Her love for Algeria was also based on her love for her husband Hamid, a "free and courageous man," according to Heinen.

In 1968 Bettina Heinen-Ayech's first works were purchased by the National Museum in Algiers (Musée National des beaux-arts d'Alger), and in 1976 she was awarded the Grand Prix de la ville d'Alger. In the same year she became president of the Circle of Friends of Erwin Bowien (Bowien had died in 1972). In 1992, a retrospective of 120 of her paintings was exhibited at the Musée National des beaux-arts d'Alger. In 1993 she received the cultural award of the Solingen civic foundation Baden. In 2004, a second large retrospective of her works was shown in Algiers, the exhibition was under the patronage of the then Algerian Minister of Culture, Khalida Toumi; in 2006, Bettina was again honored by the Algerian government. In the same year, during her absence, her house in Solingen was broken into; six paintings by Erwin Bowien were deliberately stolen.

Until 2018, Heinen-Ayech's paintings had been shown in over 100 solo and numerous group exhibitions in Europe, America, and in Africa. Her first name "Bettina" was established as her artist name, also in the Arabic spelling بتينا. . Bettina Heinen-Ayech's life and work have been published in books and films. In 2012, she returned for the first time after the war to Kreuzthal in the Allgäu region of Germany, and was accompanied by a television crew from Bayerischer Rundfunk.

Bettinia Heinen-Ayech died in Munich on June 7, 2020, at the age of 82. In 2020, a memorial plaque to her and her friends from an artists' colony was erected at the house where she grew up, known as the "Black House."

=== Places of activity ===
Bettina Heinen-Ayech's artistic life was shaped by a wide range of European and North African landscapes. Solingen, where she grew up and lived in the so-called “Black House”, remained an important point of reference throughout her life. Even after moving to Algeria, she continued to work there regularly. Until her death, the house remained a centre of the artists' community shaped by Erwin Bowien. At the same time, Guelma in northeastern Algeria, the hometown of her husband Abdelhamid Ayech, became one of the principal places of her artistic activity from the 1960s onwards.

Among the European locations where Heinen-Ayech worked were Norway, Sylt, the Ticino region and Paris. She made repeated visits to Norway as early as the 1950s and also worked in the Ticino region; later, further painting trips took her to various European landscapes. Paris likewise became a recurring place of residence and work. These journeys were closely connected with the tradition of landscape painting associated with the Solingen artists’ colony.

After moving to Algeria, Heinen-Ayech extended her artistic activities beyond Guelma to other regions of the country. Biskra and the landscapes on the edge of the Sahara, in particular, became recurring subjects in her work. The landscapes of Guelma and eastern Algeria, together with the works she later produced in other countries of the Mediterranean region, reflect the broad geographical range of her oeuvre.

Alongside these two long-standing centres of her life and work, Heinen-Ayech created paintings in numerous other places. Among the European landscapes that played an important role in her artistic development were Norway, the island of Sylt, and Ticino. Paris also became a recurring place of work and residence. Her travels and extended stays in different locations broadened the geographical scope of her painting and took her beyond Germany to other parts of Europe at an early stage of her career.

The geographical scope of Heinen-Ayech's artistic work thus extends from Central Europe through France and Scandinavia to North Africa and the Mediterranean region. Solingen and Guelma nevertheless remained the two principal long-term points of reference in her life and artistic work.

== Work ==
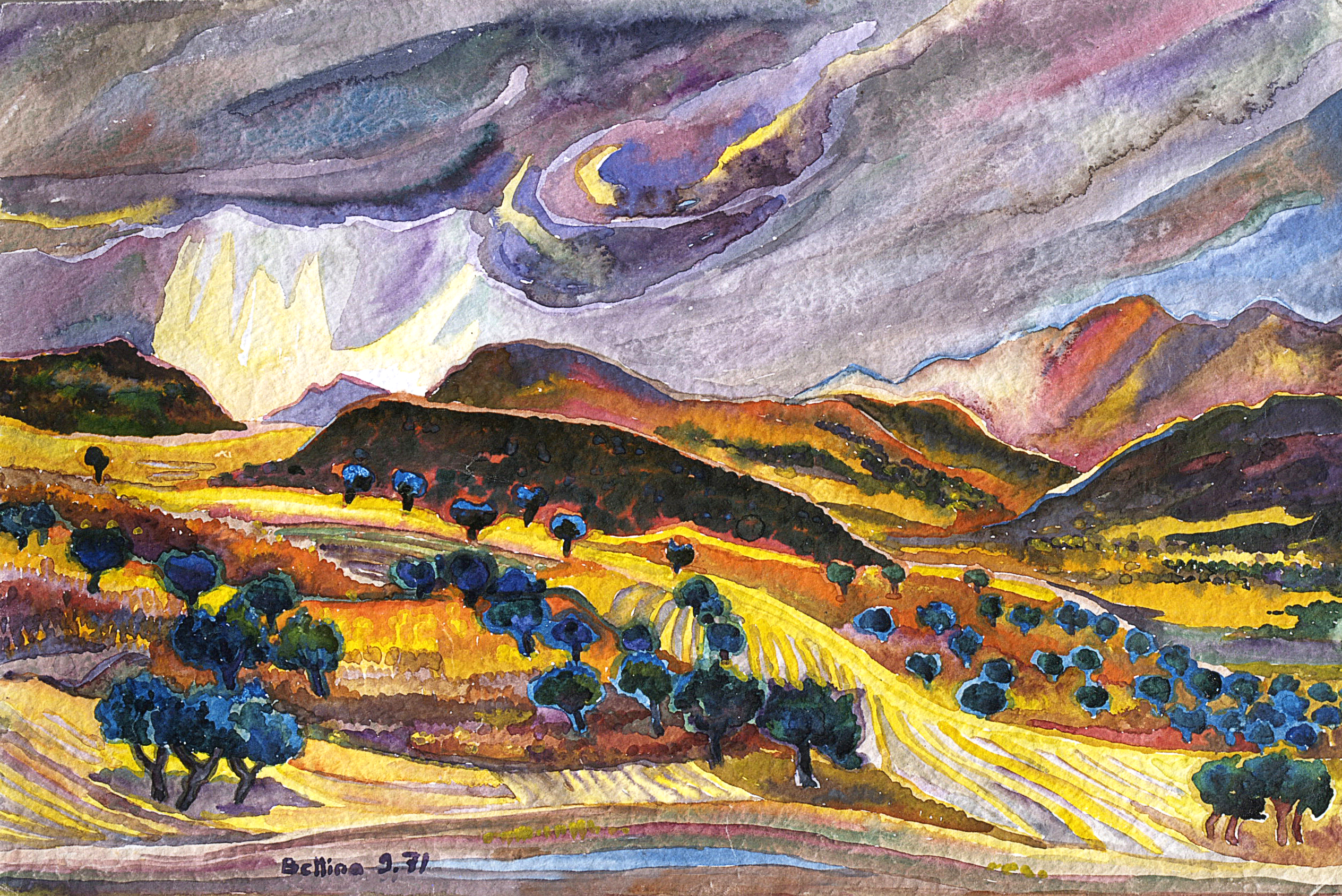
Summer thunderstorm in Algeria in 1974

Bettina Heinen-Ayech learned all techniques of painting, but puts her emphasis on watercolor painting. As an outdoor painter she created numerous landscapes, more rarely portraits. Through her stays in Algeria, she developed her own technique: because of the dry air in Guelma, the watercolors there would not run into each other as in Europe, but dry quickly. From this she developed her own approach: "I put the strong colors together like a mosaic, color stroke by color stroke," says Bettina Heinen-Ayech. When combined, the intense colors create a vivid image of the landscapes and light in Algeria. During the years of terrorism in the 1990s through the 2000s, she said, she was only able to paint portraits, still lifes, and after looking out of the window in Algeria because she was unable to travel around. In Algeria, however, Heinen-Ayech was not able to paint portraits or still lifes.

In Algeria, however, not only her technique changed, but also her personality, according to Bettina Heinen-Ayech. She moved away from her "European prejudices" and "listened" to the beautiful nature in Guelma: "The southern mountain, the Mahouna, its fields, captivate and captivate all my senses and preserve my fantasies. I paint this region in spring, while the green of the fields dotted with red - poppies - glows in all its tones, far from the dense green of Europe; in summer, when its blue and purple peaks rise above the wonderful gold of its wheat fields; in winter, when the red of the earth has an incredible power that is so difficult to represent!"

In 1967, journalist Max Metzker wrote about Bettina Heinen-Ayech in the Düsseldorfer Nachrichten: "She is able to make a landscape accessible even to those who do not know it. The portraits are not only images of people, but at the same time descriptions of the soul that plumb the depths."

=== Gallery of selected works ===
Bettina Heinen-Ayech: Forest Fire in Ticino (Switzerland), Watercolor 1959 (102 × 73 cm)

Bettina Heinen-Ayech: Ticino Gorge (Switzerland), Mixed Media on paper, 1959 (21,5 × 15,5 cm)

Bettina Heinen-Ayech: Jeder frisst jeden (Everyone Devours Everyone), Charcoal on paper, 1960 (73 × 102 cm)

Bettina Heinen-Ayech: The Sleeping Baker, Watercolor, 1963 (48 × 36 cm)

Bettina Heinen-Ayech: Blue Landscape (Valley of Guelma Algeria), Watercolour on paper, 1972 (32 × 36 cm)

Bettina Heinen-Ayech: Desert Town of Oumache (Algeria), Watercolor, 1991 (36 × 48 cm)

== "Black House" Artists' Colony ==
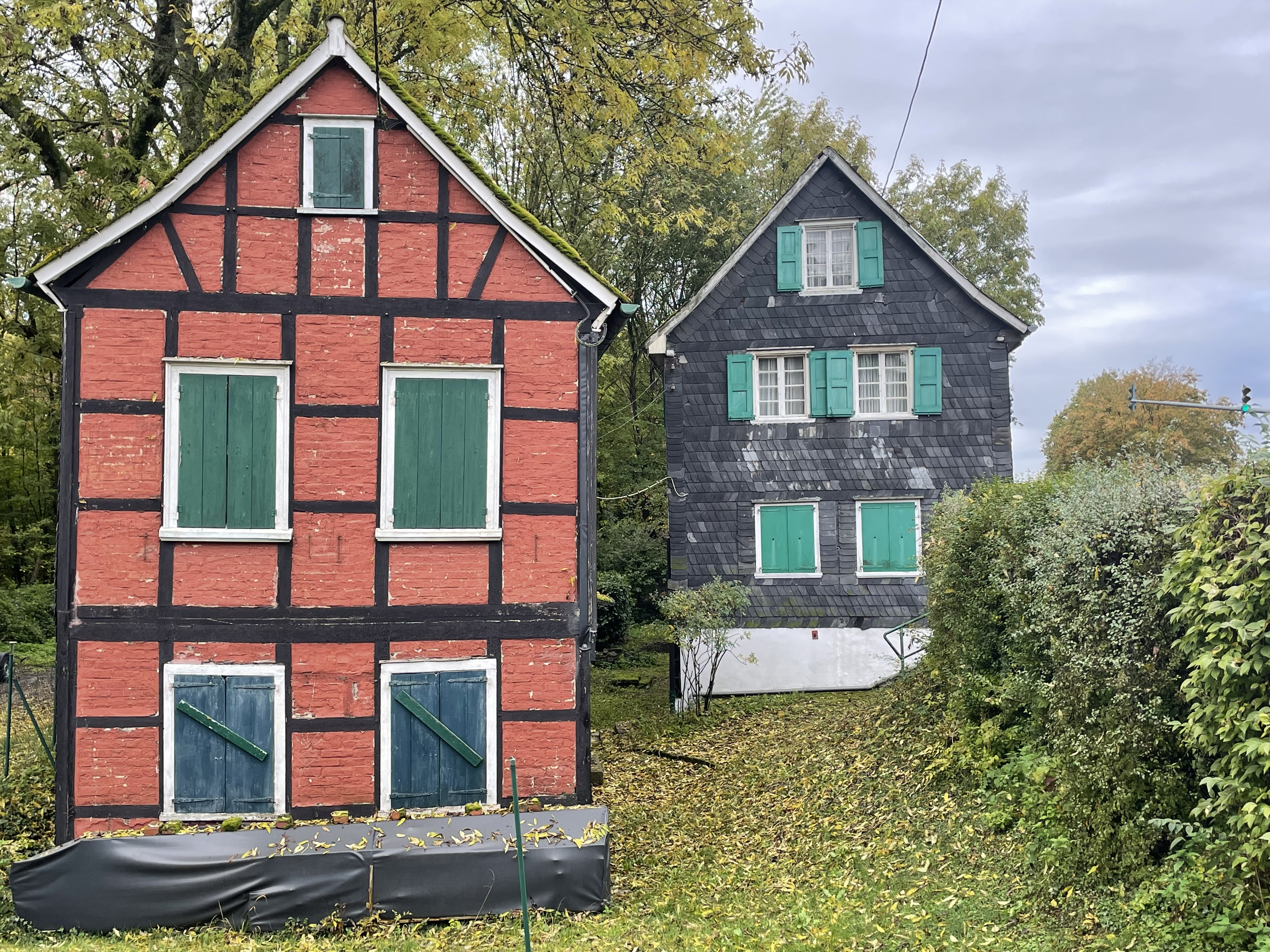
The Red and the Black House – studio houses for the Solingen artists' colony

In 2020, a memorial plaque to her and her friends from an Artists' Colony was placed on her parents' house, the so-called "Black House". In January 2022, the non-profit Bettina Heinen-Ayech Foundation for Art, Culture and International Dialogue was established. The Foundation looks after the artist's legacy.

Since Bettina Heinen-Ayech's death, her son, the Munich doctor Haroun Ayech, has been working to honour her memory and that of her artist colleagues. The artist herself lived until the end of her life in the so-called 'Black House', the former mine head's house of the Höhscheid lead mine, which Heinen's father had bought in 1932. After the Second World War, Erwin Bowien moved into the neighbouring house, the "Red House". Ayech established the Bettina Heinen-Ayech Foundation - Foundation for Art, Culture and International Dialogue. The foundation in turn initiated the "Black House" Artists' Colony project in Solingen.

In February 2023, the "Schwarzes Haus" Artists' Colony was accepted into the "European Federation of Artists' Colonies" and shortly afterwards into the "Impressionism Routes" of the Council of Europe.

== Exhibitions (selection) ==
- 1955 Kursaal of Bad Homburg
- 1957 North Frisia Museum. Nissenhaus Husum; Copenhagen, German Club
- 1958 Guelph Castle Münden
- 1961 Bern, Gallery Schneider
- 1962 Cairo, German Cultural Institute
- 1963 Solingen, German Blade Museum
- 1966 Düsseldorf, International Educational Institute Die Brücke
- 1970 Tunis, exhibition at the Salon des Arts
- 1972 Hamburg, Gallery for Contemporary Art
- 1973 Springe, Museum at Burghof; Rabat, Goethe Institute; Casablanca, Goethe Institute
- 1976 Gladbeck, Museum Schloss Wittringen
- 1980 Remscheid, Municipal Museum, Museum of Local History Museum Hasten
- 1984 Damascus, Goethe-Institut; The National Museum Damascus makes purchases; Aleppo, Musée National
- 1986 El Oued, Maison de la Culture
- 1990 Würzburg, Otto-Richter-Halle, Freunde Mainfränkischer Kunst und Geschichte e. V.; Paris, Centre Culturel Algérien
- 1992 Arundel, Little Gallery
- 1993 Algiers, Large retrospective with over 120 paintings at the Musée National des Beaux Arts d'Alger. The museum makes purchases
- 1998 Solingen, August-Dicke-Gymnasium, for its 125th anniversary
- 2000 Solingen, Baden Art Museum; Paris, City Hall
- 2002 Algiers, German-Algerian Society
- 2003 Aachen, Centre Culturel Français in the framework of the Algerian cultural year in France
- 2004 Algiers, second large retrospective of 100 paintings at the National Museum of Algiers under the patronage of the Minister of Culture Khalida Toumi
- 2008 Angers, Angers Castle
- 2013 Algier, Musée National des Beaux-Arts d’Alger: „Equinoxe féminin“
- 2017 Georgsmarienhütte, Museum Villa Stahmer
- 2022 Algiers, Musée National des Beaux-Arts d´Alger: „Algerien im Blick internationaler Maler“
- 2024 Gemäldegalerie Dachau (31 October 2024 to 27 April 2025): In der Welt unterwegs: Die Künstlerkolonie Solingen - together with Erwin Bowien and Amud Uwe Millies
- 2025 Kunstverein Coburg (25 January to 11 May): Bettina Heinen-Ayech von Solingen in den Orient
- 2025 Georgsmarienhütte, Museum Villa Stahmer (18 May to 29 June) - together with Erwin Bowien and Amud Uwe Millies
- 2025 Städtische Galerie Schwalenberg (6 July to 7 September): Zwischen den Welten – Bettina Heinen-Ayech
- 2026 Kunstraum in Churfranken (21 March to 31 May): Solingen meets Churfranken - About the Solingen Artist Colony
- 2026 Langenfeld, Wasserburg Haus Graven (12 April to 5 July): Bettina Heinen-Ayech amnd the Solingen Artists' Colony

== Honors ==
- 1976 Bettina Heinen-Ayech receives the Grand Prix de la ville d'Alger
- 1993 Culture prize of the Bürgerstiftung Baden, Solingen
- 1998 The city of Constantine in Algeria honors the artist with a Prix d'honneur
- 2003 Algerian State Prize, presented by the Minister of Culture, Mrs. Khalida Toumi, as a tribute to the artist's entire body of work
- 2006 Official honor by the Algerian Ministry of Culture
- 2024 Honoured in the FrauenOrte NRW project FrauenOrte NRW

== Publications ==
- (editor) Hanns Heinen: From the Fullness of Life. Poems. U-Form, Solingen
- (editor) Erwin Bowien: The Beautiful Game between Spirit and World - My Painter's Life. ISBN 3-88234-101-7
- (editor) Erwin Bowien. Catalog Raisonné - List of works, U-Form, Solingen 1999, ISBN 3-88234-103-3

== Literature ==
- Eduard Fallet-von Castelberg: Bettina Heinen, Kleiner, Bern 1967 (German/French)
- Ali Elhadj-Tahar/Hans Karl Pesch: Bettina Heinen-Ayech. U-Form Verlag, Solingen 1982
- Marianne Kopatz: Bettina Heinen-Ayech, Watercolors and Drawings from Algeria. Published by: Stadtsparkasse Solingen. 1985
- Malika Bouabdellah/Diana Millies/Bernard Zimmermann: Bettina Heinen-Ayech Retrospective 1951–1992. Ed.: Stadtsparkasse Solingen, 1992
- Malika Bouabdellah: "Bettina" Catalogue for the retrospective at the Musée National des Beaux-Arts, 1993
- Hans Karl Pesch: Bettina, Collection Klaus Wiens. 1999, ISBN 3-88234-106-8 [transfer title to Citavi project using this ISBN]
- Dalila Mahammed Orfali: "Bettina". Catalog for the retrospective at the Musée National des Beaux-Arts, 2005
- Taieb Larak: Bettina, la rencontre d'un peintre et d'un pays. Bettina Heinen-Ayech et l'Algérie, 2007
- Ali Elhadj-Tahar/Dr. Haroun Ayech: "Bettina". Galerie Dar El Kenz, Alger, 2016.
- Taieb Larak, Bettina. Die Begegnung einer Malerin mit einer Landschaft. Bettina Heinen-Ayech und Algerien. En-Nakhla, Algier, 2018, (ISBN 978-9947-0-5382-9)
- Dr. Claudia Schöning-Kalender; Bettina Heinen-Ayech: Bewegung, Farbe, Licht. Das Künstlerische Vermächtnis einer Malerin. Art Profil, Magazin für Kunst, Heft-Nr. 144–2021

== Movies ==
- 1992 Bettina Heinen-Ayech, Lettre à Erwin Bowien, artist portrait. Hassan Bouabdellah, Visualis Production, Algiers 1992. German version : Bettina Heinen-Ayech, Letter to Erwin Bowien. Visualis Production in collaboration with Avalon Film+TV-Produktion, Solingen 1992
- 2002 Bettina Heinen-Ayech, Hymne à la nature. Boualem Aissaoui, CYM Audiovisuel, Algiers
- 2010 Vanishing Point in the Allgäu - The Art of Memory, Erwin Bowien in the Kreuzthal. 2015, Bavarian Radio, Director: Georg Bayerle
