= Hugo Black House =

Historic house in Alabama, United States

- U.S. National Register of Historic Places
- The house in 1972

- Location within Alabama Location within the United States
- Location: S. 2nd St., E. (AL 77), Ashland, Alabama
- Coordinates: 33°15′44″N 85°50′0″W
- Area: 1 acre (0.40 ha)
- NRHP reference No.: 73000334
- Added to NRHP: October 9, 1973

The Hugo Black House was a historic house in Ashland, Alabama, United States. The one-and-a-half-story, wood-frame residence was purchased by William LaFayette and Martha Black in 1893. They were the parents of politician and U.S. Supreme Court jurist Hugo Black, who grew up in the house. The house was added to the National Register of Historic Places on October 9, 1973.

It has since been destroyed. (Note: "It was torn down many, many years ago after it had become a dilapidated structure." Donna J. Bennett Asst. City Clerk City of Ashland)
