= Arthur F. Black House =

Historic house in Arizona, United States

- U.S. National Register of Historic Places
- Location within Arizona Location within the United States
- Location: 707 Cerbat Avenue, Kingman, Arizona
- Coordinates: 35°11′41″N 114°3′30″W
- Built: 1925
- Architectural style: Spanish Colonial Revival
- NRHP reference No.: 93001324
- Added to NRHP: December 9, 1993

Arthur F. Black House is a historic house in Kingman, Arizona. It was built in 1925 and listed on the National Register of Historic Places in 1993.

== History ==
The house was built in 1919, and a second floor was added in 1933. The house is in the style of Spanish Colonial Revival. Cecil E. Chilton was the first contractor and Mr. Black did the building of the second floor. The house has a native stone wall and an open veranda and balcony. The lumber for the 1933 addition came from an original high school gym.

Mr. Black was the mining foreman at the Golconda Mine for about 4 years, a railroad engineer for 3 years, and partner in Kingman Motor Co. (Ford Dealership). He started the Boulder Dam Line, Kingman to Las Vegas line and adding to Phoenix; it handled passengers and freight. He is known as the Father of U. S. Route 93 and helped in creating U. S. Route 66 from the Old Trails Highway. He also formed the first cab company in Kingman, called Kingman Cab Co.
