= Henry C. Gale House (500 North, Beaver, Utah) =

- U.S. National Register of Historic Places
- Location within Utah
- Location: 95 E. 500 North, Beaver, Utah
- Coordinates: 38°16′54″N 112°38′23″W
- Area: less than one acre
- Built: 1897
- Built by: Henry Gale
- MPS: Beaver MRA
- NRHP reference No.: 83004404
- Added to NRHP: April 15, 1983

The Henry C. Gale House at 95 E. 500 North in Beaver, Utah was built in 1897. It was listed on the National Register of Historic Places in 1983.

It was built by Henry Gale, who was not known as a stonemason, although he built one other house. Gale may have quarried the stone for this house.

== See also ==
- Henry C. Gale House (495 N. 1st East)
