= Eave return =

An eave return (also a cornice return) is an element in Neoclassical architecture where the line of roof eave on a gable end comes down to a point, then doubles back briefly. There is a classical version and simpler substitutes.

An eve (or cornice) return is in contrast to a full pediment, which spans the full width of the gable.

Among the types are: boxed return, boxed gable return, gable end return (or full gable return) or simply gable return are variations, or synonyms.

== See also ==
- Cornice return
