= Erwin Bowien =

German painter (1899–1972)

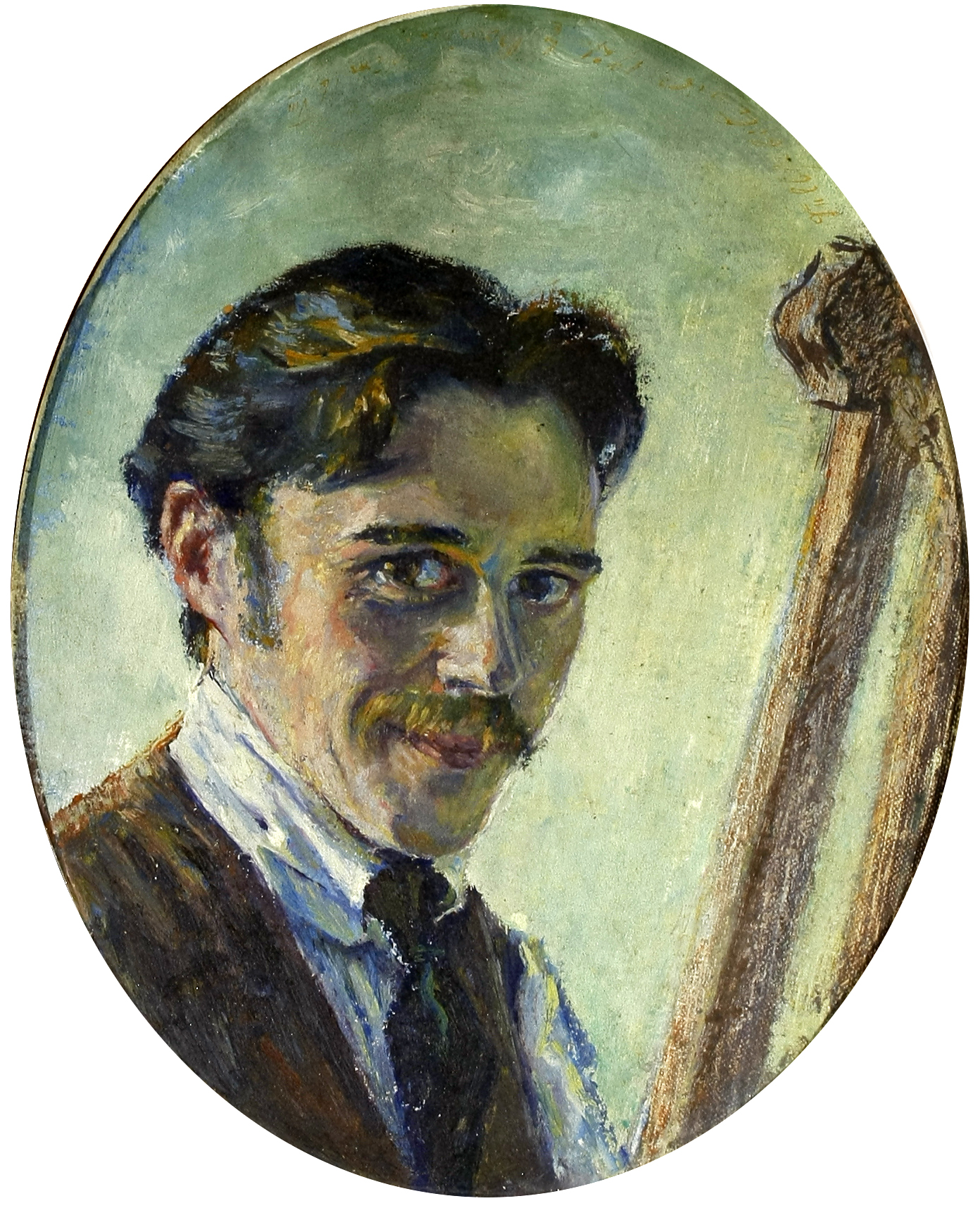
Erwin Bowien, self-portrait. 1920s

Erwin Johannes Bowien (3 September 1899 – 3 December 1972) was a German painter and author.

== Biography ==
Bowien was a born in to a family of a construction engineer from East Prussia. His mother also came from there and was descended from a family that had moved to East Prussia in the 18th century.

Bowien went to school in Berlin, attended a gymnasium and studied at the "Ecole professionelle" in Neuchâtel (Switzerland). After the First World War he studied at the Munich Art Academy, the Dresden Art Academy, and the Berlin Art Academy. He then taught himself for four years and gave lectures on art history for the Volkshochschule in Solingen.

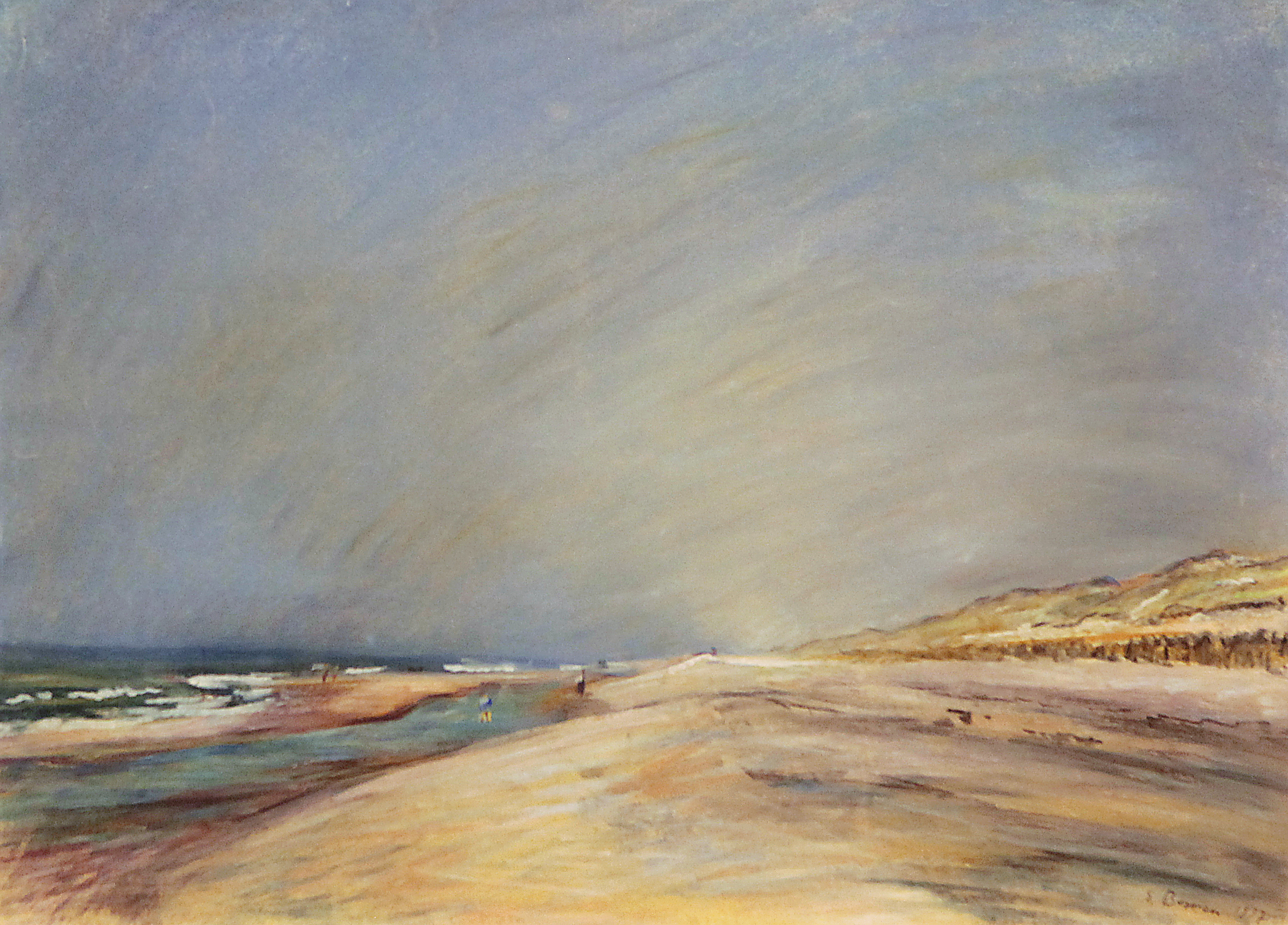
Catalog of Works 1141 - Dutch coast Strand in Egmont in summer, 1937

After the Nazi seizure of power, Bowien who was an opponent of the party, left for the Netherlands. He lived from 1933 to 1942 as a freelance artist in Egmond aan den Hoef, North Holland, in the former home of the philosopher René Descartes. When Princess Beatrix was born in 1938, Bowien came up with the idea of portraying children in Egmond aan den Hoef who saw the light of day in 1938. The paintings have been transferred by the municipality of Egmond to the Royal Household Archives.

After the German occupation of the Netherlands, Bowien was arrested and jailed for three days. He received information from Germany that his colleagues were willing to hide him. He took advantage of that offer and ended up in a small village in Bavaria where he remained unnoticed by the authorities until the end of the war. After the Second World War he visited Norway, Switzerland, among others. Exhibitions of his work have been organized in many major cities in Germany, but also in Copenhagen and Paris, and his work can be seen in several museums.

Bowien died December 3, 1972, in the house in Weil am Rhein. On October 20, 1976, the Erwin Bowien eV Friendship Association was founded in the Deutsches Klingenmuseum in Solingen.

=== Places of Activity ===
Erwin Bowien’s art consistently emerged during his many journeys and stays at various places of activity, both within Germany and abroad. Bowien and the artists of the Solingen artists’ colony were, as Laura Cohen, curator and director of the Gemäldegalerie Dachau, described it, “out in the world.”

For Erwin Bowien, travelling — being on the move — was an essential condition of his artistic practice. It accompanied him throughout his entire life, as Cohen writes. “Bowien, Heinen-Ayech and Millies never painted as visitors, as observers from the outside, but as part of the life in which they found themselves at that moment.”

== Erwin Bowien – Art‑historical Classification ==
Erwin Bowien (1899–1972) represents an independent, representational painting of the 20th century that developed largely outside the avant‑garde movements of his time. At the center of his extensive oeuvre are landscape, cityscape, and portrait. His painting combines precise observation of nature with a sense of color shaped by atmosphere and light.

From an art‑historical perspective, Bowien can most appropriately be situated within the broader context of a representational painting influenced by late Impressionism. His engagement with the Dutch landscape tradition, as well as his numerous journeys and extended stays in Europe and North Africa, shape the distinctly international character of his work.

Bowien is an artist who continued the tradition of European landscape and portrait painting under the conditions of the 20th century. His particular position is also documented by the extensive reception of his work.

== Gallery of selected works ==
Erwin Bowien: Sunset over Sylt (Germany), Pastel on paper 1951 (15.5 × 21.5 cm)

Erwin Bowien: A Still Life in Chur (Switzerland), Oil on canvas, 1959 (92 × 80 cm)

Erwin Bowien: Trondheim Cityscape (Norway), Oil on canvas, 1967 (92 × 80 cm)

Erwin Bowien: Cologne Cathedral (Germany), Oil on canvas, 1971 (136 × 147 cm)

== Exhibitions ==
Throughout his life, Erwin Bowien exhibited widely both in Germany and abroad. His first documented exhibition took place in 1917 in Neuchâtel, Switzerland, at the Rose d’Or gallery. In 1927, 1928, and 1929 he presented works at the Solinger Casino-Gesellschaft. From 1933 to 1941 he held a series of exhibitions in the Netherlands (Hoorn, Egmond, Gorinchem, Schoorl, and The Hague). After World War II, Bowien participated repeatedly - between 1947 and 1959 - in the Bergische Kunstausstellungen at the Deutsches Klingenmuseum. Other significant museum presentations include two exhibitions at the Nordfriesland Museum (Nissenhaus) in Husum in 1951 and 1957. In 1958 Bowien exhibited at Welfenschloss in Hannoversch Münden. Further exhibitions followed in Solingen at the Deutsches Klingenmuseum in 1960 and 1970. In 1968 and 1969 his works were shown at the town hall in Freiburg im Breisgau and at the Trompeterschloss in Bad Säckingen.

Bowien’s work continued to be represented in major exhibitions after his death. In 1974 the Goethe-Institut in Rabat, Morocco, presented a retrospective. Additional exhibitions at the Deutsches Klingenmuseum in Solingen (1975, 1982, 1984), at the Städtische Galerie Stapflehus in Weil am Rhein (1984 and 1999), at the Goethe-Institut in Algiers (1985), and at the Museum am Lindenplatz in Weil am Rhein (2013–2014) testify to his lasting artistic significance. Exhibitions followed at Museum Villa Stahmer in Georgsmarienhütte (2015 and 2025), at the Gemäldegalerie Dachau (2024), at the Museum van Egmond (2025), at the Städtische Galerie Schwalenberg (2025), and at the Kunstraum Churfranken in Klingenberg (2026). These presentations confirm his artistic significance in Germany and internationally well into the present day.
