= Farnsworth (surname) =

Farnsworth is a surname which may refer to:

== People ==
- Alice Hall Farnsworth (1893–1960), American astronomer
- Anna Marie Farnsworth (1895–1991), American chemist
- Bill Farnsworth (1887–1966), Australian rugby league footballer, brother of Viv
- Charles S. Farnsworth (1862–1955), American general in World War I, Chief of Infantry
- Christopher Farnsworth (born 1971), American novelist and screenwriter
- Daniel D. T. Farnsworth (1819–1892), American politician, briefly second Governor of West Virginia
- Dave Farnsworth (born 1951), American politician
- David Farnsworth, American Loyalist and British agent during the American Revolutionary War, hanged for attempting to undermine the American economy by counterfeiting money
- Dr. Dean Farnsworth, developer of the Farnsworth Lantern Test, used to screen for color blindness
- E. Allan Farnsworth (1928–2005), American legal scholar
- E. L. Farnsworth (1863–1940), American politician
- Eddie Farnsworth, American politician who first assumed office in 2001
- Edward Farnsworth (1880–1937), American college football player and US Army officer
- Elizabeth Farnsworth (born 1943), correspondent and former substitute anchor of the PBS NewsHour with Jim Lehrer
- Elon Farnsworth (Michigan Attorney General) (1799–1877), American lawyer, politician and Michigan Attorney General
- Elon J. Farnsworth (1837–1863), Union cavalry general in the American Civil War
- Emma Justine Farnsworth (1860–1952), American photographer
- Philo Taylor Farnsworth (1906-1971), "The father of television", American inventor and pioneer who was granted the first patent for the television by the United States Government
- Henry Weston Farnsworth (1890–1915), American soldier, writer, and journalist
- Herbert E. Farnsworth (1834–1908), American Civil War soldier awarded the Medal of Honor
- Jeff Farnsworth (born 1975), Major League Baseball pitcher in 2002
- Joe Farnsworth (born 1968), American jazz drummer
- John F. Farnsworth (1820–1897), American politician and Union Army general in the Civil War
- John Semer Farnsworth (1893–1952), former US Navy officer convicted of spying for Japan from 1932 to 1934
- Kyle Farnsworth (born 1976), American former Major League Baseball pitcher
- Linsey Farnsworth, British politician
- Paul R. Farnsworth (1899–1978), American music psychologist
- Philo Farnsworth (1906–1971), American inventor of the electronic television camera
- Philo Judson Farnsworth (1832–1909), American physician and professor
- Robert M. Farnsworth (1929–2022), Professor Emeritus of English at the University of Missouri and author
- Richard Farnsworth (1920–2000), American actor
- Richard Farnsworth (politician), member of the Maine House of Representatives (1996–1998, 2012–2020)
- Richard Farnsworth (Quaker) (fl. second half of 17th century), one of the early leaders of the Society of Friends (Quakers)
- Terry Farnsworth (born 1942), Canadian Olympic judoka
- Thomas J. Farnsworth, President of the West Virginia Senate from 1883 to 1885
- Tyler Farnsworth, American politician
- Viv Farnsworth (1889–1953), Australian rugby league footballer, brother of Bill
- Walter K. Farnsworth (1870–1929), American attorney and politician, Lieutenant Governor of Vermont
- Ward Farnsworth (born 1967), American law professor and dean of the University of Texas School of Law
- Wilton S. Farnsworth (1885–1945), American sports writer, editor and boxing promoter

== Fictional characters ==
- Astrid Farnsworth, a special agent in the television series Fringe
- Cubert Farnsworth, Hubert J. Farnsworth's 12-year-old clone (also from the television series Futurama)
- Hubert J. Farnsworth, a main character in the television series Futurama, named after Philo Farnsworth
- Jerry Farnsworth and his family, characters in Robert A. Heinlein's novel Job: A Comedy of Justice
- Leo Farnsworth is one of the characters played by Warren Beatty in the 1978 movie Heaven Can Wait
- Oliver V. Farnsworth, an attorney from The Man Who Fell to Earth
- Rudolph Farnsworth, a Kim Possible villain

== See also ==
- Farnworth (surname)
