= CIO50 =

CIO50 is an annual list compiled and published by CIO magazine since 2016. The purpose is to list the Australia's 50 top 50 technology and digital chiefs who are influencing rapid technology-driven change and innovation across their organisations.

== CIO50 lists ==
Below is the top 50 for each year since the list's inception.

=== 2016 ===
This is the 2016 List

2016
No.	Recipient	Title	Company
1	(Australia) Mark Gay	Chief information officer	ME Bank
2	(Australia) Wayne McMahon	Chief information officer	Domino's Pizza Enterprises
3	(Australia) Tim Thurman	Chief information officer	Australian Securities Exchange
4	(Australia) Bill Le Blanc	Chief information officer	SA Health
5	(Australia) Alastair Sharman	Chief information officer	Children's Health Queensland Hospital
6	(Australia) Scott Collary	Chief information officer	Australia & New Zealand Banking Group
7	(Australia) Leigh Berrell	Chief information officer	Yarra Valley Water
8	(Australia) Rob James	Chief information officer	William Hill
9	(Australia) Kim Wenn	Chief information officer	Tabcorp
10	(Australia) William Daniel Confalonieri	Chief information officer	Deakin University
11	(Australia) Roger Burgess	Executive Director, Operations & Technology	Scentia
12	(Australia) Christian Mc Gilloway	Head of Digital	Retail Zoo
13	(Australia) Dr Malcolm Thatcher	Chief Executive Office, CIO	eHealth Queensland
14	(Australia) Dayle Stevens	Divisional CIO, Support Services	ME Bank
15	(Australia) Kenneth Edwards Udas	Deputy Vice-Chancellor, Chief information officer	University of Southern Queensland
16	(Australia) Chris Ford	Chief information officer	SA Power Networks
17	(Australia) Christopher Johnson	Asia-Pacific IT Director	20th Century Fox
18	(Australia) Tom Clark	Global Chief Technology Officer & Chief information officer	Corporate Travel Management
19	(Australia) Hilda Clune	Chief information officer	PricewaterhouseCoopers
20	(Australia) Grainne Kearns	Group Chief information officer	Jetstar
21	(Australia) Anastasia Cammaroto	Chief information officer	BT
22	(Australia) Scott Andrews	Director, Product & Digital Strategy	Manheim
23	(Australia) Michelle Beveridge	Chief information officer	Intrepid Group
24	(Australia) John Sutherland	Chief information officer	Ramsay Health Care
25	(Australia) Andrew Clowes	Head of IT	JLL
26-50	(Australia) Berys Amor	Director of Technology	Corrs Chambers Westgarth
26-50	(Australia) Mark Ballinger	Director, Products and Technology	Progressclaim
26-50	(Australia) Richard Burns	General Manager, Customer Experience and Technology	Aussie Home Loans
26-50	(Australia) Julie Canepa	Chief information officer	Cisco
26-50	(Australia) Therese Chakour-West	IT Manager	Stihl
26-50	(Australia) Rick Coenen	Chief information officer	Sussan
26-50	(Australia) Aidan Coleman	Chief Technology Officer	Charter Hall
26-50	(Australia) Veronica Frost	Chief information officer	Australian Red Cross
26-50	(Australia) Steve Godbee	Chief information officer	IBM
26-50	(Australia) Elizabeth Harpe	Chief information officer	GHD
26-50	(Australia) Richard Host	Chief information officer	NSW Department of Finance, Service & Innovation
26-50	(Australia) Ryan Klose	General Manager, Technology and Innovation	National Pharmacies
26-50	(Australia) Timothy Larcos	Chief information officer, Private Clients	PricewaterhouseCoopers
26-50	(Australia) Cameron McFie	Chief Technology Officer	Rhipe
26-50	(Australia) Andrew Mitchell	Chief information officer, Director of National Operations	Griffith Hack
26-50	(Australia) Chris Nurse	Head of Technology Transformation	Telethon Kids Institute
26-50	(Australia) Claudine Ogilvie	Chief information officer	Ridley Corporation
26-50	(Australia) Kevin O'Hara	Group Chief information officer	Tulla Private Equity Group
26-50	(Australia) Ritesh Patel	Chief information officer	Office Brands
26-50	(Australia) Simon Ralk-Allen	Chief Technical Advisor	MYOB
26-50	(Australia) Many Ross	Chief information officer	Tatts Group
26-50	(Australia) Dave Rumsey	Chief information officer	Tourism Australia
26-50	(Australia) Mark Sheppard	General manager and chief commercial officer, Asia Pacific	General Electric
26-50	(Australia) Melanie Sinton	Chief information officer	Racing and Wagering Western Australia
26-50	(Australia) Joanne Stubbs	Chief information officer	Bakers Delight

=== 2017 ===
2017
No.	Recipient	Title	Company
1	Bill Le Blanc	Chief information officer	SA Health
2	Kim Wenn	Chief information officer	Tabcorp
3	Sami Yalavac	Chief information officer	Bupa
4	Clive Dickens	Chief digital officer	Seven West Media
5	Paul Keen	Chief technology officer	Airtasker
6	Rob Craig	Chief operating officer	icare
7	Steve Hodgkinson	Chief information officer	Victorian Department of Health & Human Services
8	Kerry Holling	Chief information and digital officer	Western Sydney University
9	Simon Noonan	Chief information officer	Sportsbet
10	David Hackshall	Chief information officer	Cochlear
11	Jeff Murray	Chief information officer	University of Tasmania
12	Alastair Sharman	Chief information officer	Children's Health Queensland Hospital and Health Service
13	George Lymbers	Chief information officer	Thomas Holt Group
14	William Confalonieri	Chief digital officer, CIO and vice-president	Deakin University
15	Chris Ford	Chief information officer and general manager of business improvement	SA Power Networks
16	Sam Charmand	Chief information officer and executive manager innovation	Qantas Loyalty
17	Hilda Clune	Chief information officer	PricewaterhouseCoopers
18	Jeremy Hubbard	Head of digital and technology	UBank
19	Farid Jarrar	Chief information officer, APAC & North Americas	Stellar
20	Francoise Russo	Group chief information officer	Toll Group
21	Greg Booker	Chief information officer	Royal Automobile Club of Queensland
22	Peter Auhl	Chief information officer	City of Adelaide
23	Aidan Coleman	Chief technology officer	Charter Hall
24	Ani Paul	Chief information officer	ING Australia
25	Christian McGilloway	Chief technology innovation officer	Retail Zoo
26-50	Jason Blackman	Chief information officer	Carsales
26-50	Joshua Bovell	Chief information officer	Toxfree
26-50	Julie Canepa	Chief information officer Australia and New Zealand	Cisco
26-50	Andrew Clowes	Head of IT	JLL
26-50	Angela Coble	Director, business technology	Johnson & Johnson
26-50	Rick Coenen	Chief information officer	Sussan
26-50	Mark Cohen	Chief technology officer	Domain
26-50	Vinnie D’Alessandro	Head of technology	Silver Chef
26-50	Gordon Dunsford	Chief information officer	WaterNSW
26-50	Colin Fairweather	Chief information officer	City of Melbourne
26-50	Brett Ferguson	General manager of technology	Carlisle Homes
26-50	Andrew Flannery	Executive general manager, corporate travel	Flight Centre
26-50	Mathews George	Chief information officer	Energy Action
26-50	Suzanne Hall	ICT manager	VincentCare Victoria
26-50	Senthu Jegadheesan	Chief information officer	TravelEdge Group
26-50	Cameron McFie	Chief technology officer	Rhipe
26-50	Richard McPartlin	Chief information officer	Ingham's Group
26-50	Kevin O'Hara	Group chief information officer	Tulla Private Equity Group
26-50	Darren Oliver	National director, business and technology solutions	Herron Todd White
26-50	van Ortiz	Head of technology	Ubet
26-50	Roisin Parkes	Chief technology officer	Gumtree
26-50	Rohan Penman	Head of technology	Adairs Retail Group
26-50	Ursula Phillips	Chief information officer	PepsiCo
26-50	Shane Riddle	Chief information officer	The Heart Foundation
26-50	Shaune Rosser	Chief information officer	Sydney Motorway Corporation
Ones to watch	John Boyd	Chief information officer	Mad Mex
Ones to watch	Lina Lim	Head of technology	National Stock Exchange
Ones to watch	William Payne	Chief information officer	Boral

=== 2018 ===
2018
No.	Recipient	Title	Company
1	George Hunt	General manager, digital business and CIO	Sydney Water
2	Steve Hodgkinson	Chief information officer	Victorian Department of Health and Human Services
3	Aidan Coleman	Chief technology officer	Charter Hall
4	Dr Zoran Bolevich	Chief executive, eHealth NSW and chief information officer, NSW Health	NSW Health
5	Rebecca Kerr	General manager, technology	Roy Hill
6	Peter Auhl	Chief information officer	City of Adelaide
7	Gerard Florian	Group executive, technology	Australia & New Zealand Banking Group
8	Chris Ford	Chief information officer	SA Power Networks
9	Jeremy Hubbard	Head of digital and technology	UBank
10	Jason Blackman	Chief information officer	Carsales
11	Ani Paul	Chief information officer	ING Australia
12	Bruce Winzar	Executive director innovation and digital services	Bendigo Health
13	Sarah Harland	Chief information officer	Suncorp
14	Ryan Klose	Executive general manager, corporate	National Pharmacies
15	Brett Winn	Chief information officer	Blackmores
16	Christian McGilloway	Chief technical innovation officer	Retail Zoo
17	Damian Madden	General manager, digital	The Woolmark Company
18	Tomas Varsavsky	Chief engineer	REA Group
19	Rowan Dollar	Chief information officer	Northern Territory Department of Primary Industry and Resources
20	Jeff Murray	Chief information officer	University of Tasmania
21	Simon Noonan	Chief information officer	Sportsbet
22	Willam Payne	Chief information officer	Boral
23	Mark Allen	Head of customer experience and operations technology	Qantas
24	Aidan McCarthy	Chief information officer	Catholic Education of Western Australia
25	Shane Lenton	Chief information officer	Cue Clothing Co
26-50	Jithma Beneragama	Director, digital engagement and innovation	Department of Premier and Cabinet (Victoria)
26-50	Michelle Beveridge	Chief operating officer	Intrepid Group
26-50	Christine Burns	Chief information officer	University of Technology Sydney
26-50	Julie Canepa	Chief information officer	Cisco Systems
26-50	Mark Cohen	Chief technology officer	Domain Group
26-50	William Confalonieri	Chief Digital & Information Officer	Deakin University
26-50	Vinnie D’Alessandro	Head of technology	Silver Chef
26-50	Linda da Silva	General manager of business integration, group technology	BT
26-50	Nina Du Thaler	Group executive, digital and technology	UnitingCare Queensland
26-50	Rishi Dutta	Chief information officer	Public Transport Victoria
26-50	Angela Goodsir	Chief technology and systems operations officer	Multi Channel Network
26-50	Matthew Leary	Chief information officer	Tassal Group
26-50	Anthony Molinia	Chief information officer	University of Newcastle
26-50	Robin Phua	Director, digital experience and CIO	State Library of New South Wales
26-50	Phil Ridley	Chief information officer	Mojo Power
26-50	Simon Smith	Group chief technology officer	Vocus Group
26-50	Dawn Stephenson	General manager, technology, Lotteries and Keno	Tabcorp
26-50	John Sutherland	Chief information officer	Ramsay Health Care
26-50	Ben Tabell	Chief information officer	HSBC
26-50	Christopher Topp	Director of IT	Luther College
26-50	Darrel van Dort	Chief information officer	Merivale
26-50	David Wong	Assistant director-general, information technology and CIO	National Library of Australia
26-50	Andy Wood	Executive director, corporate services	Department of Finance (WA)
26-50	Trevor Woods	Chief information officer	Monash University
26-50	Clarence Yap	Chief information officer	Smartgroup Corporation

=== 2019 ===
2019
No.	Recipient	Title	Company
1	Roger Sniezek	Chief information and digital officer	Coles Group
2	Shane Lenton	Chief information officer	Cue Clothing Co
3	Greg Booker	Chief information officer	Royal Automobile Club of Queensland
4	Rob Bollard	Chief information officer and general manager, innovation and technology group	IP Australia
5	Dr Zoran Bolevich	Chief information officer	NSW Health
6	Simon Button	Chief information officer	RSL Queensland
7	Pete Steel	Chief digital officer	Commonwealth Bank
8	Ursula Phillips	Group chief information officer	Real Pet Food Company
9	Dr Steve Hodgkinson	Chief information officer	Department of Health and Human Services (Victoria)
10	Gary Adler	Chief digital officer	MinterEllison
11	Viv Da Ros	Chief information officer	Caltex Australia
12	Rob Pickering	Head of IT and digital	Cbus Super
13	Tomas Varsavsky	Chief engineer	REA Group
14	Simon Herbert	Director, operations	NSW Data Analytics Centre
15	Alex Twigg	Chief information officer and co-founder	Judo Bank
16	Vincent ten Krooden	General manager - technology	Mortgage Choice
17	Damian Madden	General manager - digital	The Woolmark Company
18	Angela Coble	Director, business technology	Johnson & Johnson
19	Julie Wright	General manager for business and digital transformation	Porter Davis
20	Andrew Cann	Chief information officer	Western Australia Police
21	Brett Wilson	Chief information officer	MJH Group
22	Chris Locke	Chief information officer	Flight Centre
23	Fiona Rankin	Director of information and technology services	University of Wollongong
24	Raju Varanasi	Chief information officer and director, data intelligence	Catholic Education Diocese of Parramatta
25	Bradley Blyth	Chief technology officer	flybuys
26-50	Kerrie Campbell	Chief information officer	Flinders University
26-50	Julie Canepa	Chief information officer	Cisco Systems
26-50	Therese Chakour-West	Head of IT	Stihl
26-50	Jason Davey	Head of experience technology	Ogilvy
26-50	Mauro di Pietro Paolo	Chief information officer	Foxtel
26-50	Gordon Dunsford	Chief information and technology officer	New South Wales Police Force
26-50	David Dzienciol	Executive vice president of technology and chief customer officer	NextDC
26-50	Michael Grant	Deputy chief operating officer and director, IT services	Murdoch University
26-50	Anna Leibel	Chief delivery and information officer	UniSuper
26-50	Andy Luiskandl	Chief information officer	Only About Children
26-50	Sam McCready	Chief information officer	Racing & Wagering Western Australia
26-50	David McGrath	Chief digital officer	Clubs Australia
26-50	Maria Milosavljevic	Chief data officer	Department of Human Services (Australia)
26-50	Anthony Molinia	Chief information officer	University of Newcastle
26-50	Phil Morgan	Chief information officer	Jaxsta
26-50	Russell Morris	Chief information officer	TransGrid
26-50	Nathan Pilgrim	Chief information officer	Gallagher Bassett Australia
26-50	Simon Reiter	Chief information officer	Defence Health
26-50	Mike Rogers	Chief technology officer and co-founder	SiteMinder
26-50	Oliver Schmill	Chief information officer	Mercedes-Benz
26-50	Michael Snell	Service strategy manager	Airservices Australia
26-50	Andrew Todd	Chief technology officer	Iress
26-50	Peter Whitfield	Chief technology officer	Cashwerkz
26-50	Elizabeth Wilson	Chief information officer	Department of Education and Training (Victoria)
26-50	David Wong	Chief information officer	National Library of Australia
Ones to watch	Ivan Bate	Technology transformation manager	Western Earthmoving
Ones to watch	Brett Raven	Group chief information officer	The Big Red Group

=== 2024 ===
2024
No.	Recipient	Title	Company
1	Kurt Brissett	Chief Technology and Innovation Officer	Transport for NSW
2	Nicola Dorling	Group Chief Information Officer	Downer
3	Gary Adler	Chief Digital Officer	Minter Ellison
4	John Vohradsky	Chief Information Officer	IRT Group
5	Senthu Jegadheesan	Chief Technology Officer	Pen CS
6	Alan Sharvin	Chief Information Officer	Tabcorp
7	Alex Ji	Chief Information Officer	New Aim
8	Eglantine Etiemble	Chief Technology Officer	PEXA
9	Bradley Blyth	Chief Information Officer	Kmart
10	Suzanne Hall	Chief Information Officer	Baptcare
11	Paul Joseph	Chief Digital Officer	RSM Australia
12	Warren Havemann	Chief Information Officer	Aveo Group
13	Arul Arogyanathan	Chief Information Officer	Village Roadshow
14	Andrew Dome	Chief Digital Information Officer	Uniting
15	Alan Pritchard	Director EMR and ICT Services	Austin Health
16	Damian Madden	Director Digital Transformation and Consumer Experience	Pernod Ricard Winemakers
17	Russell Morris	Chief Information Officer	APA
18	Jeremy Hubbard	Chief Technology and Data Officer	Rest
19	Tom Gao	Chief Technology and Digital Services Officer	City of Sydney
20	Mary Criniti	Chief Technology Officer	Qantas Loyalty
21	Howard Phung	Group Director of Digital, Data and Technology	Pro-Invest Group
22	David Alia	Chief Product & Technology Officer	PropHero
23	Rohan Khana	Group Executive, Technology	Probe CX
24	Stevie-Ann Dovico	Chief Information Officer	Beyond Bank
25	Darrel van Dort	Chief Information Officer	Beerfarm
26-50	Rosalie Adriano	Head of IT, Oceania	Nestlé
26-50	Hani Arab	Chief Information Officer	Seymour White
26-50	Miles Ashton	Chief Technology Officer	Export Finance Australia
26-50	Nazih Battal	Chief Information Officer	Rashays
26-50	Selina Beauchamp	Director – Organisational Transformation	Wesley Mission Queensland
26-50	Fiona Caldwell	Chief Information Officer	Estia Health
26-50	Vince Condina	Chief Information Officer	The University of Adelaide
26-50	Andrew Cresp	Former Chief Information Officer	Bendigo and Adelaide Bank
26-50	Marcelo Dantas	Chief Information Officer	Automic Group
26-50	Clive Dickens	Vice President – TV, Content & Product Development	Optus
26-50	Gordon Dunsford	Executive General Manager Digital	AEMO
26-50	Sinan Erbay	Chief Information Officer	RMIT University
26-50	Melanie Evans	Group Executive, Digital Services	Ventia
26-50	Ben Fitzgerald	Chief Information Officer	MYER
26-50	Laurent Fresnel	Group Chief Technology & Innovation Officer	The Star Entertainment Group
26-50	Farid Jarrar	Chief Information and Digital Officer	CPA Australia
26-50	Milad Kruze	Executive General Manager – Information Technology	The Salvation Army
26-50	Sandip Kumar	Executive Director and Chief Digital Officer	Gold Coast Hospital and Health Service
26-50	Anthony Molinia	Chief Digital & Information Officer	University of Newcastle
26-50	Geoff Quattromani	Head of Technology, ANZ	Johnson&Johnson MedTech
26-50	Brett Reedman	Chief Information Officer	Catholic Healthcare
26-50	Rachael Sandel	Chief Information Officer	Orica
26-50	Noel Toal	Chief Information Officer	DPV Health
26-50	Warren Willis	Chief Transformation & Technology Office	P&N Group
26-50	Brett Wilson	Chief Information Officer	Australian Red Cross
