= Robert Ferguson (executive) =

Robert Alexander "Rob" Ferguson (2 December 1945 – 31 August 2024) was an Australian investment banker who served as the chief executive of Bankers Trust Australia (BTA) from 1985 to 1999, and as its chairman until 2001.

== Early life and education ==
Born in Camperdown, Sydney, Ferguson grew up in Padstow and attended East Hills Boys High School. His parents were Hector "John" Ferguson, a company secretary and financial controller, and June Ferguson, a clerk. He experienced lung problems from birth. He later reflected that his parents' contentious relationship fostered in him a "compromiser, mediator attitude."

In 1968, he married Jenny Jarvis and completed his honours degree in Economics. A student trip to China during the Cultural Revolution in 1967 sparked his interest in Geopolitics and economics.

== Career ==
Ferguson began his commercial career in 1969 at the stockbroking firm William Tilley Hudson Evans, which posted him to Hong Kong in 1970. He considered this period formative, providing him with confidence and an understanding of economic trends and business analysis.

=== Bankers Trust Australia (BTA) ===
Upon returning to Sydney in 1972, Ferguson joined Ord BT Co., which was later renamed Bankers Trust Australia. He became chief executive in 1985, at the onset of Australia's financial deregulation. Alongside his mentor Chris Corrigan, Ferguson positioned BTA as an aggressive competitor to what he saw as complacent, established institutions. Under his tenure, BTA became highly successful, with rival Alan Moss of Macquarie Bank later describing it as their "number one rival" and "most formidable competitor."

=== Post-BTA career ===
After leaving BTA, Ferguson served on the boards of several major companies, including Westfield and the GPT. He was also involved in public discourse as chair and later deputy chair of The Sydney Institute and as a director of the Sydney Writers' Festival.

== Personal life ==
Ferguson and his wife Jen had one daughter, Rachel (1971–2018). In the 1980s, he helped establish his wife's restaurant, You & Me.

He was an avid horse racing enthusiast and was involved in breeding and owning several Thoroughbreds, including nine Group 1 winners such as Ha Ha (Golden Slipper), Row of Waves (Doncaster), and Gypsy Goddess (Queensland Oaks).
