= Farnworth (disambiguation) =

Farnworth is a town in Greater Manchester, England. It may also refer to:

== People ==
- Farnworth (surname), a surname of English origin

== Places ==
- Farnworth, Cheshire, an area of Widnes, Cheshire, England

== Other uses ==
- Farnworth & Bold railway station, a former railway station in Farnworth, Widnes, Cheshire
- Farnworth (UK Parliament constituency), a former constituency in Lancashire, later in Greater Manchester
- Farnworth Grammar School, a former school in Farnworth in Greater Manchester
- Farnworth railway station, a railway station serving Farnworth in Greater Manchester
- Municipal Borough of Farnworth, the former local authority for the town of Farnworth, now in Greater Manchester
- SS Farnworth, the original name used for a steamship between 1917 and 1924

== See also ==
- Farnsworth (disambiguation)
