= Donald Marquis =

Donald or Don Marquis may refer to:

- Don Marquis (1878–1937), American humorist, journalist and author
- Don Marquis (philosopher) (1935–2022), American moral philosopher
- Donald Marquis (psychologist) (1908–1973), president of the American Psychological Association
