= Farnsworth =

Farnsworth may refer to:

== Places ==
- Farnsworth, Indiana, a ghost town
- Farnsworth, Texas, an unincorporated community in the Texas Panhandle
- Farnsworth Peak, a mountain located west of Salt Lake City, Utah

== People ==
- Farnsworth (surname), a list of people and fictional characters
- Farnsworth Donald (1952), American artist, inventor, papermaker
- Farnsworth Wright (1888–1940), editor of the pulp magazine Weird Tales

== Other uses ==
- Farnsworth Art Museum, Rockland, Maine
- Farnsworth House (disambiguation), various places
- Farnsworth Lantern Test, used to screen for color blindness
- Farnsworth Middle School, Guilderland Central School District, Guilderland, New York
- Farnsworth Metropark, near Toledo, Ohio
- Farnsworth method of learning Morse code
- Farnsworth, a diesel engine in the 1991 movie The Little Engine that Could

== See also ==
- Gen. Charles S. Farnsworth County Park, located in Altadena, California
- Farnworth (disambiguation)
