= Farnsworth House (disambiguation) =

The Farnsworth House is a Ludwig Mies van der Rohe-designed house in Plano, Illinois, US.

Farnsworth House also may refer to:

== United States ==
- Samuel Farnsworth House, West Hartford, Connecticut, listed on the National Register of Historic Places
- Farnsworth House (North Bridgton, Maine), listed on the National Register of Historic Places
- The Farnsworth House Inn, Gettysburg, Pennsylvania
- Julia Farnsworth House, Beaver, Utah, listed on the National Register of Historic Places

== See also ==
- Farnsworth Homestead, Rockland, Maine, listed on the National Register of Historic Places
- Julia P. M. Farnsworth Barn, Beaver, Utah, listed on the National Register of Historic Places
- Farnsworth Apartments, Ogden, Utah, listed on the National Register of Historic Places
- Farnsworth Art Museum
