= Annual Review of Psychology =

- Discipline: Psychology
- Language: English
- Edited by: Susan T. Fiske

Publication details
- History: 1950–present
- Publisher: Annual Reviews (United States)
- Frequency: Annually
- Open access: Subscribe to Open
- Impact factor: 41.8 (2025)

Standard abbreviations
- ISO 4: Annu. Rev. Psychol.

Indexing
- CODEN: ARPSAC
- ISSN: 0066-4308 (print); 1545-2085 (web)
- OCLC no.: 909903176

Links
- Journal homepage

The Annual Review of Psychology is a peer-reviewed academic journal that publishes review articles about psychology. First published in 1950, its longest-serving editors have been Mark Rosenzweig (1969–1994) and Susan Fiske (2000–present). As of 2023, Annual Review of Psychology is being published as open access, under the Subscribe to Open model. As of 2026, Journal Citation Reports gives the journal a 2025 impact factor of 41.8, ranking it first of 93 journal titles in the category "Psychology" and first of 222 titles in the category "Psychology, Multidisciplinary" .

== History ==
Annual Reviews (AR) is a nonprofit organization whose stated mission is to synthesize knowledge "for the progress of science and the benefit of society." In 1947, AR's board of directors asked a number of psychologists if it would be useful to have a journal that published an annual volume of review articles that summarized recent developments in the field. Responses were very positive, so in September 1947 they announced that the first volume of the Annual Review of Psychology would be published in 1950. Previous attempts to establish such a journal in the early 1940s were stymied by World War II, which hampered international scientific communication. Its first editor was Calvin Perry Stone. As of 2020, it was published both in print and electronically. Some of its articles are available online in advance of the volume's publication date.

== Scope and indexing ==
The Annual Review of Psychology defines its scope as covering various aspects of psychology, including human behavioral ecology, sensation and perception, cognition, animal learning and behavior, clinical psychology, psychopathology, developmental psychology, social psychology, personality, environmental psychology, and community psychology. It is abstracted and indexed in Scopus, Science Citation Index Expanded, Social Sciences Citation Index, and Academic Search, among others.

== Editorial processes ==
The Annual Review of Psychology is helmed by the editor. The editor is assisted by the editorial committee, which includes associate editors, regular members, and occasionally guest editors. Guest members participate at the invitation of the editor, and serve terms of one year. All other members of the editorial committee are appointed by the AR board of directors and serve five-year terms. The editorial committee determines which topics should be included in each volume and solicits reviews from qualified authors. Unsolicited manuscripts are not accepted. Peer review of accepted manuscripts is undertaken by the editorial committee.

=== Editors of volumes ===
Dates indicate publication years in which someone was credited as a lead editor or co-editor of a journal volume. The planning process for a volume begins well before the volume appears, so appointment to the position of lead editor generally occurred prior to the first year shown here. An editor who has retired or died may be credited as a lead editor of a volume that they helped to plan, even if it is published after their retirement or death.

- Calvin Perry Stone (1950–1954)
- Paul R. Farnsworth (1955–1968)
- Paul H. Mussen and Mark Rosenzweig (1969–1974)
- Rosenzweig and Lyman W. Porter (1975–1994)
- Janet T. Spence (1995–1999)
- Susan Fiske (2000–present)

== See also ==
- Annual Review of Clinical Psychology
