= Mark Rosenzweig (psychologist) =

American research psychologist

- Born: September 12, 1922; Rochester, New York, U.S.
- Died: July 20, 2009 (aged 86); Berkeley, California, U.S.
- Education: University of Rochester; Harvard University
- Occupation: Psychologist
- Employer: University of California, Berkeley
- Spouse: Janine Chappat
- Children: 2 daughters and 1 son

Mark Richard Rosenzweig (September 12, 1922 – July 20, 2009) was an American research psychologist whose research on neuroplasticity in animals indicated that the adult brain remains capable of anatomical remodelling and reorganization based on life experiences, overturning the conventional wisdom that the brain reached full maturity in childhood.

== Early life and education ==
Rosenzweig was born on September 12, 1922, in Rochester, New York, to Jews of Eastern European origin, in which his bilingual parents (his lawyer father and homemaker mother spoke both English and German) helped foster an interest in language and learning. He attended the University of Rochester there planning to major in history, but ended up switching to psychology and receiving a bachelor's degree in 1943 and a master's degrees in 1944 with a focus on auditory perception.

Following the completion of his studies in 1944, he enlisted in the United States Navy, initially serving as a radar technician at the Anacostia Naval Station. He was later relocated to Tsingtao in China, where he was stationed on the seaplane tender USS Chincoteague.

He attended Harvard University after completing his military service in 1946, and was awarded a Ph.D. in 1949. His thesis showed that the connections between the cochlea and the cerebral cortex could be monitored using electrodes placed on the scalp, without requiring cranial surgery.

== University of California, Berkeley ==
Rosenzweig was hired by the University of California, Berkeley in 1949 as an assistant professorship in physiological psychology, and remained on its faculty until he retired in 1991. Dissatisfied with existing textbooks in biological psychology, he and colleague Arnold Leiman wrote a textbook in the 1980s that is still in print.

Rosenzweig initiated experimental research upon enriched environment and the brain. Donald O. Hebb, in 1947, had found that rats raised as pets performed better on problem solving tests than rats raised in cages. But his research did not investigate the brain directly nor use standardized impoverished and enriched environments. Mark Rosenzweig with his colleagues David Krech, Edward Bennett and Marian Diamond started this research in the late 1950s by comparing single rats in normal cages, and those placed in ones with toys, ladders, tunnels, running wheels in groups. They found that growing up in enriched environments affected activity of the enzyme cholinesterase in the brain. This work led in 1962 to the discovery that environmental enrichment increased cerebral cortex volume. He published details of his research in the book Enriched and Impoverished Environments: Effects on Brain and Behavior in 1987.

These findings contradicted the prevailing scientific theory that the brain's structure was fixed before adulthood and that later learning and experience did not affect its structure. Later research confirmed that the changes occurred in adulthood and were not tied to differences in diet. Neurobiologist James McGaugh credited Rosenzweig's research with having "laid to rest the idea that the brain is fixed in terms of its composition; that's now regarded as nonsense" with the subject of research changing to how, not if, the brain changes based on experience.

Rozenzweig was the co-editor of the Annual Review of Psychology with Paul H. Mussen from 1969 to 1974 and with Lyman Porter from 1975 to 1994.

Rosenzweig retired from UC Berkeley in 1991. The American Psychological Association recognized him with its Distinguished Scientific Contribution Award in 1982.

== Personal life and death ==
A resident of Berkeley, California, Rosenzweig died at his home at age 86 of renal failure on July 20, 2009. He was survived by two daughters, a son, six grandchildren and four great-grandchildren. He married his French-born wife, the former Janine Chappat, in the summer of 1947. She had studied anthropology and education at the University of Oxford and had been visiting the United States when they met. She died in April 2008 after they had been married for 60 years.
