= William Thompson Jr. House =

- U.S. National Register of Historic Places
- Location within Utah Location within the United States
- Location: 10 W. 400 North, Beaver, Utah
- Coordinates: 38°16′48″N 112°38′29″W
- Area: less than one acre
- Built: c.1880
- Built by: Thomas Frazer
- MPS: Beaver MRA
- NRHP reference No.: 82004103
- Added to NRHP: September 17, 1982

The William Thompson Jr. House, at 10 W. 400 North in Beaver, Utah, was built around 1880 by Scottish-born local stonemason Thomas Frazer. It was listed on the National Register of Historic Places in 1982.

It was built as a one-story black rock cottage with two rooms, and a symmetric window-door-window front facade.. It has endwall chimneys. It displays three of Frazer's characteristic elements: use of ashlar stonework on the front facade, use of beaded white mortar joints, and use of a Greek Revival-style cornice.

According to its Utah State Historical Society information form:

This home is significant because of its historic date, its nearly unaltered appearance, its black rock construction materials and its builder. / Thomas Frazer was a folk architect in pioneer Beaver who built scores and scores of structures. All of the commercial and industrial ones have been razed and many of the residential ones are gone too. Of all Frazer T s buildings, the ones to survive in the largest quantity are the more elaborate houses. The more modest residences, like this home under discussion, have often been razed or "modernized". That is why this home is so interesting - it has survived nearly unaltered. The additions, which are also of a historic date, extend backwards from the rear of the house, leaving the original two room rock cottage with unimpared architectural integrity. Even the interior, with its high ceilings and hard grained woodwork, has not been altered. / It is important to find an example of Frazer's more modest residential architecture because it is also illustrative of his early architecture. He frequently built two room rock cottages, with medium-pitched roofs and Greek Revival style cornices. These cottages also had the ashlor stonework and the white mortar joints, but few of them are still extant. Thus the Thompson house is of further significance because it is very similar - if not a duplicate - of many of Frazer's early homes.

The property includes a small wood-frame building, probably built around 1890, which was a saloon in downtown Beaver. It was moved to this property before 1912 by William Thompson, Jr.

The property also has a root cellar, with a dirt roof, that could appear to be historical, but the owner in 1979 said he had built that recently.

== See also ==
- William Thompson House (Beaver, Utah), also NRHP-listed
