= Joseph Bohn House =

Historic house in Utah, United States

- U.S. National Register of Historic Places
- Location within Utah Location within the United States
- Location: 355 S. 200 West, Beaver, Utah
- Coordinates: 38°16′6″N 112°38′38″W
- Area: less than one acre
- Built: 1872
- Architect: Thomas Frazer
- MPS: Beaver MRA
- NRHP reference No.: 82004080
- Added to NRHP: September 17, 1982

The Joseph Bohn House, in Beaver, Utah, was built in 1872. It was listed on the National Register of Historic Places in 1982. It was designed and built by Thomas Frazer. It was at one time the home of Butch Cassidy's grandmother Jane Gillies, and many Beaver residents believe Butch Cassidy was born on the property, although not in this house, which was built after his birth.
