= Chief information officer =

Information technology executive

- Synonyms: CIO, CDIO

A chief information officer (CIO), chief digital information officer (CDIO), or information technology (IT) director is a job title commonly given to the most senior executive in an enterprise who works with information technology and computer systems, in order to support enterprise goals.

Normally, the CIO reports directly to the Managing Director. In military organizations, the CIO reports to the commanding officer. The role of chief information officer was first defined in 1981 by William R. Synnott, former senior vice president of the Bank of Boston, and William H. Gruber, a former professor at the Massachusetts Institute of Technology Sloan School of Management. A CIO will sometimes serve as a member of the board of directors.

== The need for CIOs ==
CIOs and CDIOs play an important role in businesses that use technology and data because they provide a critical interface between the business needs, user needs, and the information and communication technology (ICT) used in the work. In recent years it has become increasingly understood that knowledge limited to just business or just IT is not sufficient for success in this role. Instead, CIOs need both kinds of knowledge to manage IT resources and to manage and plan "ICT, including policy and practice development, planning, budgeting, resourcing and training." Also, CIOs are playing an increasingly important role in helping to control costs and increase profits via the use of ICT, and to limit potential organizational damage by setting up appropriate IT controls and planning for IT recovery from possible disasters.

These objectives also demand a combination of personal skills. Computer Weekly magazine highlights that "53% of IT leaders report a shortage of [IT managers] with a high-level of personal skills, such as communication and leadership" in the workplace. Because information technologies and digital tools evolve so quickly, organizations are sometimes challenged to find staff with the necessary combination of skills in the marketplace, and may look to train existing staff to mitigate skill shortages. CIOs are needed to bridge the gap between IT and non-IT professional roles to support effective working relationships.

== Roles and responsibilities ==
The chief information officer of an organization is responsible for several business functions. First and most importantly, the CIO must fulfill the role of a business leader. The CIO makes executive decisions regarding matters such as the purchase of IT equipment from suppliers or the creation of new IT systems. Also as a business leader, the CIO is responsible for leading and directing the workforce of their specific organization. A CIO is typically "required to have strong organizational skills." This is particularly relevant for the chief information officer of an organization who must balance roles and responsibilities in order to gain a competitive advantage, whilst keeping the best interests of the organization's employees in mind. CIOs also have the responsibility of recruiting, so it is important that they work proactively to source and nurture the best employees possible.

CIOs are required to map out both the ICT strategy and ICT policy of an organization. The ICT strategy covers future-proofing, procurement, and the external and internal standards laid out by an organization. Similarly, the CIO must develop the ICT policy, which details how ICT is utilized and applied. Both are needed for the protection of the organization in the short and long term and the process of strategizing for the future. Paul Burfitt, former CIO of AstraZeneca, also outlines the role of the CIO in IT governance, which he refers to as the "clarifying [of] accountability and the role of committees".

In recent years, CIOs have become more closely involved in customer-facing products. With the rising awareness in organizations that their customers are expecting digital services as part of their relationship with an organization, CIOs have been tasked with more product-oriented responsibilities.

== Risks involved ==
The CIO faces a rather high risk of error and failures, as a result of the challenging nature of the role, along with a large number of responsibilities – such as the provision of finance, recruitment of professionals, establishing data protection and development of policy and strategy. The CIO of U.S company Target was forced into resignation in 2014 after the theft of 40 million credit card details and 70 million customer details by hackers. CIOs that are knowledgeable about their industry are able to adapt and thereby reduce their chances of error.

With the introduction of legislation such as the General Data Protection Regulation (GDPR), CIOs have now become increasingly focused on how their role is regulated and can lead to financial and reputational damage to a business. However, regulations such as GDPR have also been advantageous to CIOs, enabling them to have the budget and authority in the organization to make significant changes to the way information is managed. Sabah Khan-Carter of Rupert Murdoch's News Corp described GDPR as "a really big opportunity for most organizations".

== Educational background and technology skills ==
Many candidates have a Master of Business Administration degree or a Master of Science in Management degree. More recently, CIOs' leadership capabilities, business acumen, and strategic perspectives have taken precedence over technical skills. It is now quite common for CIOs to be appointed from the business side of the organization, especially if they have project management skills.

Despite the strategic nature of the role, a 2017 survey, conducted by Logicalis, of 890 CIOs across 23 countries found that 62% of CIOs spend 60% or more of their time on day to day IT activities.

In 2012, Gartner Executive Programs conducted a global CIO survey and received responses from 2,053 CIOs from 41 countries and 36 industries. Gartner reported that survey results indicated that the top ten technology priorities for CIOs for 2013 were analytics and business intelligence, mobile technologies, cloud computing, collaboration technologies, legacy modernization, IT management, customer relationship management, virtualization, security, and enterprise resource planning.

CIO magazine's "State of the CIO 2008" survey asked 558 IT leaders whom they report to, and the results were: CEO (41%), CFO (23%), COO (16%), corporate CIO (7%) and other (13%).

Typically, the CIO is involved with driving the analysis and re-engineering of existing business processes, identifying and developing the capability to use new tools, reshaping the enterprise's physical infrastructure and network access, and identifying and exploiting the enterprise's knowledge resources. Many CIOs head the enterprise's efforts to integrate the Internet into both its long-term strategy and its immediate business plans. CIOs are often tasked with either driving or heading up crucial IT projects that are essential to the strategic and operational objectives of an organization. A good example of this would be the implementation of an enterprise resource planning (ERP) system, which typically has wide-ranging implications for most organizations.

Another way that the CIO role has changed is an increasing focus on service management. As SaaS, IaaS, BPO and other flexible delivery techniques are brought into organizations the CIO usually manages these 3rd party services. In essence, a CIO in the modern organization needs business skills and the ability to relate to the organization as a whole, as opposed to being a technological expert with limited functional business expertise. The CIO position is as much about anticipating technology and usage trends in the market place as it is about ensuring that the business navigates these trends with expert guidance and strategic planning aligned to the corporate strategy.

A review of CIO vacancy positions and requirements in higher education between April 2009 and May 2010 from the Chronicle of Higher Education, Educause and HigherEdJobs.com found that only 44.30% of the positions required a graduate degree as a requirement. Brown speculates that position postings that do state a graduate degree requirement are simply attempting to create a larger pool of candidates. Brown reported that 79% of CIOs (who responded to his survey) have graduate degrees, and this percentage has been steadily increasing since 2007. According to Brown's 2010 survey, 58% of CIOs have master's degrees while 21% have a doctorate. Of those possessing a doctorate, these CIOs were working in all types of institutions ranging from doctoral-granting institutions to those with a special focus. About one third of these CIOs were working at a Master's institutions while another third were working at a doctoral-granting institution. In contrast, his survey showed that the majority of CIOs with a master's degree as their highest level of academic preparation were working at institutions granting only associate degrees. In terms of degree majors for CIO positions, Brown found that 40% of the job postings did not identify the major preferred and another 44% requested a computer related major, or in IT or business. 46% of CIOs and 48% of members of the institution management team believed that the degree major was not important. On a related note, the top four degree majors for technology leaders which comprised 70% of the responses were technology, business, education and administration.

== Distinction between CIO, CDO, and CTO ==
The roles of chief information officer, chief digital officer and chief technology officer are often mixed up. It has been stated that CTOs are concerned with technology itself, often customer-facing, whereas CIOs are much more concerned with its applications within the business and how they can be managed.

More specifically, CIOs oversee a business's IT systems and functions, create and deliver strategies and policies, and focus on internal customers. In contrast to this, CTOs focus on the external customers to the organization and how technology can make the company more profitable.

The traditional definition of CTOs focused on using technology as an external competitive advantage now includes CDOs who use the power of modern technologies, online design and big data to digitize a business.

== CIO Councils ==
CIO Councils bring together a number of CIOs from different organizations which aim to work together, for example across healthcare or across government. Examples include the UK public sector's CIO Council, the London CIO Council for the healthcare sector, and the Chief Information Officers Council in the USA.

== In higher education ==
A chief information officer in higher education is the senior executive who is responsible for information and communications technology in the university, college or other higher education institution. The position may not necessarily be called a CIO in some institutions. The CIO title is often coupled with Vice President/Vice Chancellor of information technology, is primarily used at doctoral/research institutions, while the titles of Director or Dean are more common at the other five types of Carnegie Classification of Institutions of Higher Education; MA I, MA II, BA Liberal Arts, BA General, and AA. In addition, the CIO title used at different institutions may represent unique positions with differing roles and responsibilities. Ultimately, there is no one definition for a CIO; it has a variety of meanings, functions, areas of purview, reporting structures, and required qualifications. Some traditional executive and administrative positions in higher education, such as a chief financial officer position or chief academic officer/provost have been in existence for a long time and typically have a definite career path. In contrast, the position of CIO in higher education, which has only been around for about 35 years, has no single career path nor single model to explain what can be expected of CIOs in higher education, which makes it a challenge and an opportunity for those interested in preparing for such a role (Brown, 2009; Cash & Pearlson, 2004; Nelson, 2003). Brian L. Hawkins (2004), former president of Educause concluded:

There is no defined career path for CIOs, nor is there any certification, degree, or even a common body of knowledge that such a ::person should have mastered in order to fulfill this kind of position effectively…finding the right CIO is more about aligning ::personal traits, skills, professional orientation, proven success, and vision with a given campus culture and climate. (p. 100)

== Awards and recognition ==
It is not uncommon for CIOs to be recognized and awarded annually, particularly in the technology space. These awards are commonly dictated by the significance of their contribution to the industry and generally occur in local markets only. Awards are generally judged by industry peers, or senior qualified executives such as the chief executive officer, chief operating officer or chief financial officer. Generally, awards recognize substantial impact to the local technology market.

In Australia, the top 50 CIOs are recognized annually under the CIO50 banner. In the United States of America, United Kingdom and New Zealand CIOs are recognized under the CIO100 banner.

== See also ==
- Chief information security officer
- Chief technology officer
- Chief AI officer
- Chief digital officer
- Chief executive officer
- Chief financial officer
- Chief operating officer
- Chief investment officer
- Chief idea officer
- Chief knowledge officer
- Chief accessibility officer
- Public information officer
