= Paul R. Farnsworth =

American music psychologist

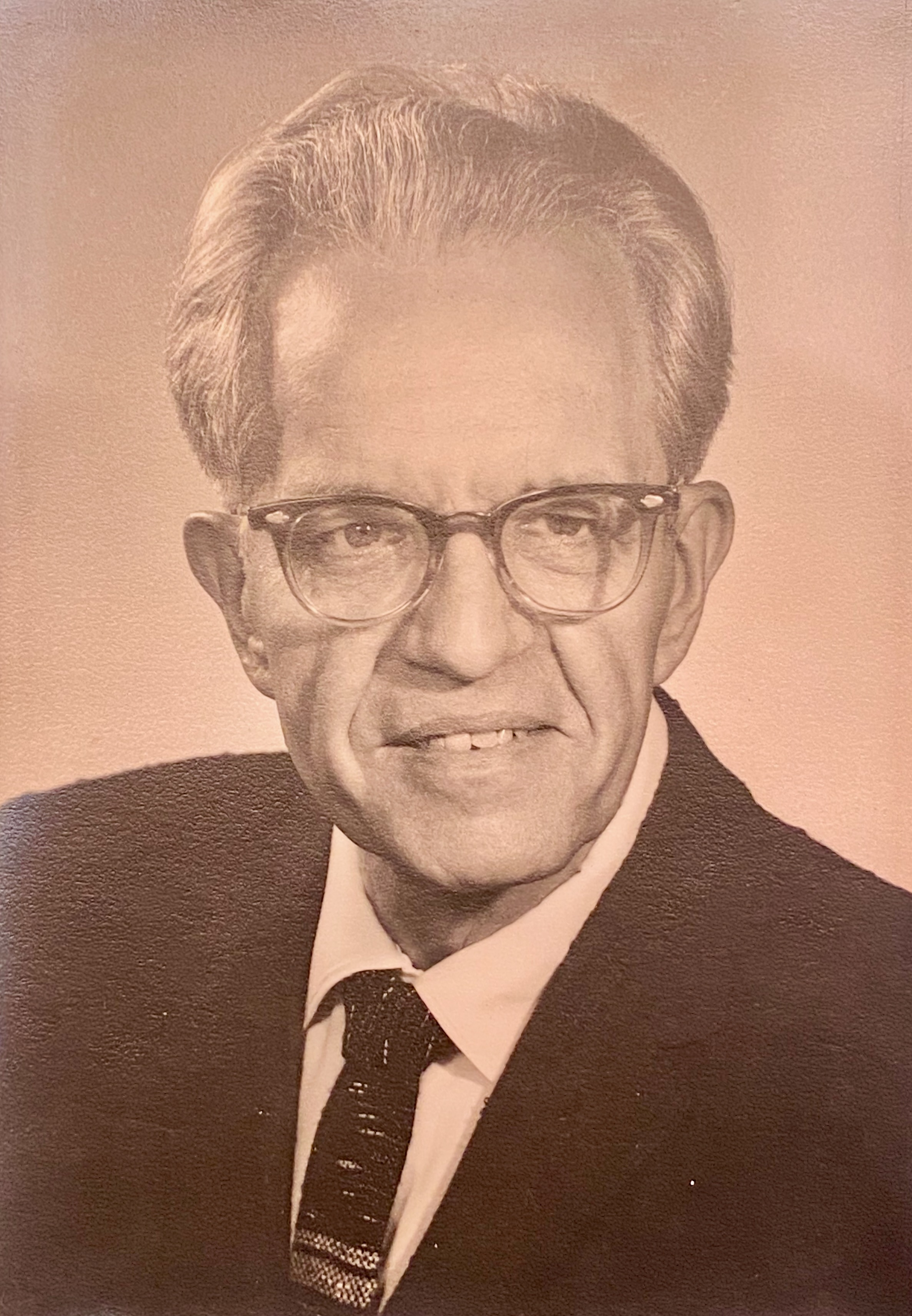
- Paul R. Farnsworth, circa 1960s
- Born: August 15, 1899; Waterbury, Connecticut, United States
- Died: October 27, 1978 (aged 79); Stanford, California
- Education: Ohio State University
- Partner: Helen née Cherington
- Children: 2
- Scientific career
- Institutions: Stanford University
- Thesis: Ending preferences and apparent pitch of a combination of tones (1925)
- Doctoral advisor: Albert Paul Weiss

Paul R. Farnsworth (August 15, 1899 – October 27, 1978) was an American music psychologist. He had a forty-year career at Stanford University where he researched the psychology of music preference. In addition to authoring three books, he was the editor of the Annual Review of Psychology from 1955 to 1968.

== Early life and education ==
Paul Randolph Farnsworth was born in Waterbury, Connecticut, on August 15, 1899 to parents Hiland R. and Elizabeth M. Farnsworth. He grew up in Ohio, and attended Sandusky High School. He then attended the Ohio State University, where he majored in psychology. He remained at Ohio State to complete a master's degree and a PhD, graduating in 1925 under advisor Albert Paul Weiss.

== Career ==
In 1925, Farnsworth accepted a teaching position at Stanford University. He largely remained at Stanford for the rest of his career, aside from brief visiting scholar stints at Ohio State University, the University of Chicago, and the University of Wisconsin. During World War II, he served as the acting chair of the psychology department. During his research career, he studied the formation of music preference. He retired from Stanford in 1964.

Farnsworth was the editor of the Annual Review of Psychology from 1955 to 1968. He authored three books: Social Psychology (1936), Musical Taste: Its Measurement and Cultural Nature (1950), and The Social Psychology of Music (1958). The last title was translated into Japanese and German, and was republished in two editions, the last in 1969.

== Personal life and death ==
Farnsworth married Helen née Cherington soon after getting hired at Stanford. Helen earned a PhD in economics at Stanford and became a professor in their Food Research Institute in 1929. The Farnsworths became one of the first married couples employed as regular faculty members at Stanford. They had two children.

Farnsworth played the violin throughout his life. He was frequently in poor health—in his younger years, he was afflicted by chronic amoebic dysentery. In later life, he had angina. He died of cancer on October 27, 1978, at his home in Stanford, California.
