= Claude-Mathias Phaneuf =

Kidnap victim in colonial North America (1690–1773)

- Born: Matthias Farnsworth III; 6 August 1690; Groton, Massachusetts Bay
- Died: August 7, 1773 (aged 83); Saint-Antoine-sur-Richelieu
- Known for: Kidnapped by Abenaki Indians as a teen; Progenitor of the Phaneuf name
- Children: 4 daughters and 8 sons
- Parent(s): Matthias Farnworth Jr, Sarah Nutting Farnsworth
- Relatives: Claude de Ramezay (godfather)

Claude-Mathias Phaneuf (1690–1773), born Matthias Farnsworth III, is a Canadian historical figure who was an English prisoner of war as a teenager, became a French citizen, and is the source and progenitor of the family name Phaneuf in North America. He was abducted from near his home in Groton, Massachusetts, in 1704 by Abenaki warriors and taken to Montreal during Queen Anne's War.

== Biography ==
=== Early life and family ===
Montreal street sign named in honor of Claude-Mathias Phaneuf

The Farnsworth family originated from England. Matthias Farnsworth is believed to have emigrated and was first recorded settled in Lynn, Massachusetts in 1657. Although the exact timeline is unclear, he married Mary Farr of Lynn before moving to Groton in 1660. He died in 1689 at "about 77 years of age". His son, Matthias Farnsworth, Jr. married Sarah Nutting in Groton and had 4 children before he died in 1693. Matthias Jr. participated in the Siege of Brookfield under Major Willard.

Matthias Farnsworth III was born in Groton in 1690.

=== Kidnap victim ===
In 1704, around the time of his 14th birthday, Matthias III was kidnapped near his home in Groton, Massachusetts by an Abenaki Indian raiding party and brought to Montreal.

Matthias III's nephew Ebenezer was similarly taken from Charlestown, New Hampshire along with Susannah Willard Johnson and is featured in her memoir A Narrative of the Captivity of Mrs. Johnson. During Matthias III's lifetime, Groton was subjected to numerous Indian attacks, and multiple other children were abducted, including Lydia Longley.

=== Life in Canada ===
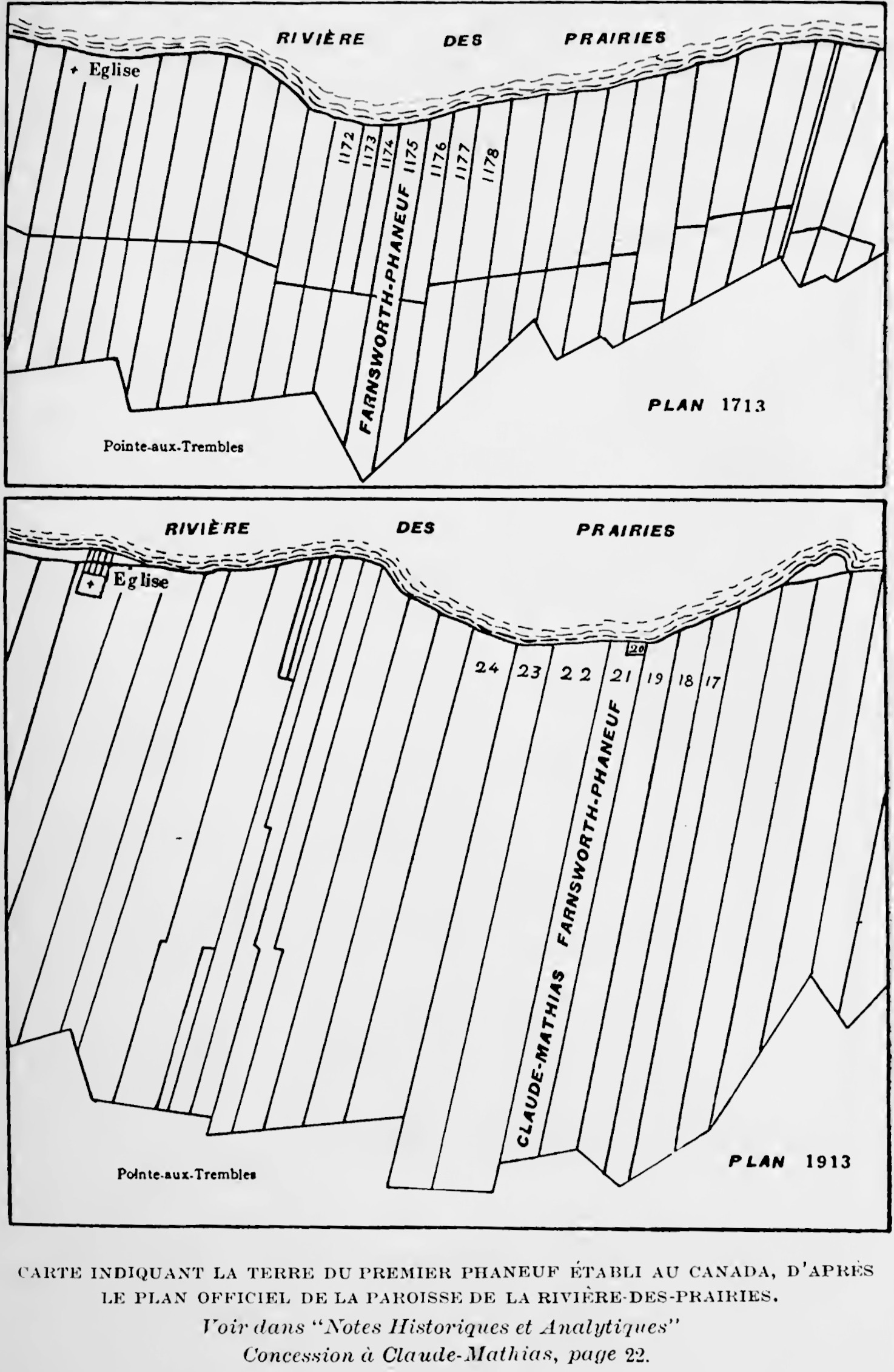
A map of the land concession to Claude-Mathias Phaneuf parcel

Late in 1704, Matthias arrived in Sault-au-Recollet and was admitted to the mission at Fort Lorette by François Vachon de Belmont. At the mission, boys were educated by Sulpician missionaries while the girls were educated by the sisters of the Congregation of Notre Dame. For most children taken to Sault-au-Recollet, it was a temporary stay until they could be returned to their families. Matthias stayed at the mission and converted to Catholicism, just as Lydia Longley had done 10 years before.

Matthias was baptized Mathias-Claude Farneth on Jan 10, 1706, and had as his godfather Claude de Ramezay and as his godmother Elisabeth Souart, wife of Charles le Moyne de Longueuil, Baron de Longueuil. Although it was usually the case that children would live with their godparents, Mathias remained at the mission. In October, 1706 he petitioned the crown for naturalization under the name Mathieu Claude Farnets. In 1711, he was given a land grant of 40 arpents by the Sulpicians, the grant citing his service at the mission. He was given a ribbon farm on the north end of the island, adjacent to Jean Carpentier and his family.

In September 1713, Mathias signed a contract to marry Catherine Charpentier, his neighbor's daughter, as Claude Mathias Fanef. The contract was also signed by Claude de Ramezay and Vachon de Belmont as witnesses. They married a month later at St Joseph's parish with Fr Robert Gay presiding. They had 12 children. Later in life, they moved to Saint-Antoine-sur-Richelieu where Mathias died in 1773. His tombstone reads Claude-Mathias Phaneuf.

=== Variations on the name ===
The numerous spellings of his name come from a combination of the original pronunciation of Farnsworth, his presumed illiteracy at 14, and the language barrier with the French. The original pronunciation of his name was roughly FAR-noth, which was transliterated in New France as Farneth. It transformed over time and was spelled in various records as Farnets, Fanef, Faneuf, and Phaneuf.

Claude-Mathias is known today as the ancestor of all Phaneufs in Canada and the United States.
