= Thomas Frazer (stonemason) =

Scottish-born American architect

Thomas Frazer (August 8, 1821 in Lortny, Scotland – March 16, 1904 in Beaver, Utah) was an American mason known for his work in Beaver, Utah. Born in Lortny, Scotland, he created many works that are listed on the U.S. National Register of Historic Places.

== Early history ==
Thomas Frazer was born in 1821, 25 miles northwest of Dundee, Scotland in the small mill town of Lortny. After a stint as a worker in a weaving factory, Frazer became a stonemason, working with a gang of masons on a number of construction projects. In 1861 at the age of 40, Frazer married and, alongside his new bride, relocated to the Utah Territory in the United States to join the Church of Jesus Christ of Latter-day Saints.

He worked on the new temple in Salt Lake City, before being sent to help settle the town of Lehi, Utah. The town primarily used adobe as its main building material, and was unlikely to have appealed to the stonemason. After spending seven years in Lehi, he was given the opportunity to direct a building project in Beaver, Utah, located 150 miles southwest of Lehi.

== Beaver ==
Frazer arrived in 1868 and started work on industrial structures, none of which remain. He built almost exclusively with basalt at that time, a black or grey rock available in the local hills. Basalt is a hard volcanic rock, it weathers very well, but is somewhat difficult to cut. Frazer and his team of masons split and chiseled the stone, making a roughly squared face. These blocks were set in courses on the building facades that faced the streets. The blocks were then finished around the edges with black-dyed mortar and joined by a white mortar joint, giving a squared look to the slightly irregular edges. The dressed stone, known as Ashlar masonry, was used only for the outer shell of the stone walls. The rest of the wall was made of infilled rubble stone, forming a wall with a total thickness of about 18 inches. In 1881, after a quarry for volcanic tuff, also known as pink rock, opened, Frazer switched to that softer, easier to work material.

Thomas Frazer became the most prolific stonemason in Beaver and the only builder in town to make a full-time living from construction. While most of his non-residential buildings have been removed or replaced in the 20th century, many of the houses still remain.

He died on March 16, 1904.

== Works ==
Works (credits) include:

- Joseph Bohn House, 355 S. 200 West, Beaver, UT (Frazer, Thomas) NRHP-listed
- Julia P. M. Farnsworth Barn, 180 W. Center St. (rear), Beaver, UT (Frazer, Thomas) NRHP-listed
- Julia Farnsworth House, 180 W. Center St., Beaver, UT (Frazer, Thomas) NRHP-listed
- David L. Frazer House, 817 E. 200 North, Beaver, UT (Frazer, Thomas & David Ingles) NRHP-listed
- Thomas Frazer House, 590 N. 300 West, Beaver, UT (Frazer, Thomas) NRHP-listed
- Duckworth Grimshaw House, 95 N. 400 West, Beaver, UT (Frazer, Thomas) NRHP-listed
- Thomas Jones House, 635 N. 400 West, Beaver, UT (Frazer, Thomas) NRHP-listed
- Mathew McEvan House, 205 N. 100 West, Beaver, UT (Frazer, Thomas) NRHP-listed
- David Powell House, 115 N. 400 West, Beaver, UT (Frazer, Thomas) NRHP-listed
- School House, 325 N. 200 West, Beaver, UT (Frazer, Thomas) NRHP-listed
- Robert Stoney House, 295 N. 400 West, Beaver, UT (Frazer, Thomas) NRHP-listed
- Joseph Tattersall House, 195 N. 400 West, Beaver, UT (Frazer, Thomas) NRHP-listed
- William Thompson, Jr., House, 10 W. 400 North, Beaver, UT (Frazer, Thomas) NRHP-listed
- Edward Tolton House, 210 W. 400 North, Beaver, UT (Frazer, Thomas) NRHP-listed
- Charles Dennis White House, 115 E. 400 North St., Beaver, UT (Frazer, Thomas) NRHP-listed
- Charles Willden House, 180 E. 300 South, Beaver, UT (Frazer, Thomas) NRHP-listed
