= Duckworth Grimshaw House =

- U.S. National Register of Historic Places
- Location within Utah Location within the United States
- Location: 95 N. 400 West, Beaver, Utah
- Coordinates: 38°16′29″N 112°38′54″W
- Area: less than one acre
- Built: 1877
- Built by: Frazer, Thomas
- NRHP reference No.: 80003886
- Added to NRHP: February 1, 1980

The Duckworth Grimshaw House, at 95 N. 400 West in Beaver, Utah, was built in 1877. It was listed on the National Register of Historic Places in 1980.

It is a one-and-a-half-story I-house built of black rock (basalt). It has walls 18 inches (0.46 m) thick and is 36 by 20 feet (11.0 m × 6.1 m) in plan.

It was a work of stonemason Thomas Frazer.
