= Donald Marquis (psychologist) =

American psychologist (1908–1973)

- Born: June 22, 1908; Two Harbors, Minnesota
- Died: February 17, 1973 (aged 64); Boston, Massachusetts
- Known for: Past president, American Psychological Association
- Scientific career
- Fields: Psychology
- Institutions: University of Michigan

Donald George Marquis (June 22, 1908 – February 17, 1973) was an American psychologist and a past president of the American Psychological Association (APA). He was best known for his tenure as a department chair and professor at the University of Michigan.

== Early life ==
Marquis was born in Two Harbors, Minnesota. His father taught at Bellingham State Teachers' College in Bellingham, Washington, and Marquis attended the college for a year. He completed an A.B. at Stanford University in 1928. Marquis pursued graduate study at Stanford for two years, before his advisors, Calvin Perry Stone and Lewis Terman, encouraged him to finish his graduate education at another institution. He transferred to Yale University. In 1931, Marquis married Dorothy Postle, a postdoctoral fellow at Yale. He completed a Ph.D. at Yale in 1932.

== Career ==
Before he assumed his role at the University of Michigan, Marquis was a professor and department chair at Yale and he worked for the National Research Council. Marquis co-wrote Theories of Learning with Ernest Hilgard in 1940. He took over as chairman of the psychology department at Michigan in 1945. That year he gave the first congressional testimony from an APA officer; he was serving as secretary and speaking in favor of a piece of neuropsychiatric legislation. Marquis served as APA president in 1948. With Robert S. Woodworth, he co-wrote a textbook, Psychology: A Study of Mental Life. With Hilgard, he also wrote Hilgard and Marquis' Conditioning and Learning.

== Later life ==
In 1969, Marquis joined the faculty of the Massachusetts Institute of Technology. He became the David Sarnoff Professor of Technology Management in the MIT Sloan School of Management in the fall of 1972. He died of a heart attack on February 17, 1973. He was survived by a wife and two children.

The Marquis Award is given to the University of Michigan doctoral student with the best dissertation in psychology. The D.G. Marquis Behavioral Neuroscience Award is given for the best paper each year in the journal Behavioral Neuroscience.

== Selected publications ==
- Hilgard, Ernest Ropiequet, and Donald George Marquis. Conditioning and learning. (1940).
- Gruber, William H., and Donald G. Marquis, eds. Factors in the Transfer of Technology. (1969).
- Myers, Summwe, and Donald G. Marquis. Successful industrial innovation. Institute of Public Administration, 1969.

Articles, a selection:

- Marquis, Donald G. "The anatomy of successful innovations." Innovation 1.7 (1969): 28-37.
