= Paul H. Mussen =

American developmental psychologist

- Born: March 21, 1922; Paterson, New Jersey, United States
- Died: July 7, 2000 (aged 78); Berkeley, California
- Education: Connecticut State College; Stanford University; Yale University
- Partner: Ethel née Foladare
- Children: 2
- Scientific career
- Institutions: United States Navy; University of Wisconsin; Ohio State University; University of California, Berkeley

Paul Henry Mussen (March 21, 1922–July 7, 2000) was an American developmental psychologist who described stages of child psychological development. He was co-editor of the Annual Review of Psychology from 1969–1974.

== Early life and education ==
Paul Henry Mussen was born on March 21, 1922, in Paterson, New Jersey, though grew up in Willimantic, Connecticut. His parents, Harry and Tauve Mussen, were Jewish immigrants from Russia. Harry Mussen worked in silk manufacturing but was also a published poet. He had a brother, Irwin. Paul Mussen initially attended Connecticut State College (what is now the University of Connecticut) at the age of sixteen before getting a scholarship to Stanford University in 1939. At Stanford, he completed his bachelor's and master's degrees In 1944, he joined the United States Navy, where he was assigned to the US Navy Japanese Language School in Boulder, Colorado. He then served as a naval intelligence officer in Washington, D.C., Hawaii, and San Francisco. Following his time in the Navy, he attended Yale University for his PhD, graduating in 1949.

== Career ==
After completing his doctoral studies, he accepted a teaching position at the University of Wisconsin, where he worked from 1949 to 1951. This was followed by a job teaching at the Ohio State University until 1955. He received a fellowship from the Ford Foundation to work as a postdoctoral researcher at the University of California, Berkeley, which was followed by an offer to stay at Berkeley as an instructor. He remained at Berkeley for the rest of his career. Mussen was considered an expert in the field of developmental psychology and authored and edited many books on the subject, including Child Development and Personality, The Psychological Development of the Child, and Handbook of Research Methods in Child Development; the Handbook of Child Psychology. Child Development and Personality, first published in 1956, became a widely read text: more than one million copies were sold; it was translated into ten other languages; and it was republished in seven editions in the forty years after its initial publication. Along with Mark Rosenzweig, he was the co-editor of the Annual Review of Psychology from 1969–1974.

Mussen was one of the first psychologists to integrate the biological, social, and psychological development of children. In addition to defining stages of development, he also provided detail and continuity for how one stage transitioned into the next.

== Awards and honors ==
Mussen was the fist recipient of the Society for Research in Child Development's Award for Distinguished Contributions to Education in Child Development.

== Personal life and death ==
He met Ethel née Foladare during his time at Ohio State University; she was a graduate student in the speech and communications department. They married and had a daughter, Michele, and a son, Jim. Mussen died on July 7, 2000, in Berkeley, California, from prostate cancer.
