= Phaneuf =

Phaneuf is a French-Canadian surname, gallicized from the English surname Farnworth. Most carriers of this surname descend from Matthias Farnsworth, an English colonist from Groton, Massachusetts, who was captured in 1704 by Abenaki Indians in a raid during Queen Anne's War, and brought to Montreal, where he was converted to Catholicism. Notable people with the surname Phaneuf include:

- Al Phaneuf (born 1944), Canadian Football League player
- Cynthia Phaneuf (born 1988), Canadian figure skater
- Dion Phaneuf (born 1985), Canadian ice hockey player
- Jean-Luc Phaneuf (1955–2021), Canadian ice hockey player
- Joseph-Émery Phaneuf (1863–1935), Canadian politician
- Madeleine Phaneuf (born 1995), American biathlete
- Ryan S. Phaneuf (1989–2020), U.S. Air Force pilot

Additionally, American actor Christopher Meloni is descended from Matthias Farnsworth on his mother's side.
