= School House (Beaver, Utah) =

- U.S. National Register of Historic Places
- Location within Utah Location within the United States
- Location: 325 N. 200 West, Beaver, Utah
- Coordinates: 38°16′43″N 112°38′43″W
- Area: less than one acre
- Built: c. 1870s
- Built by: Thomas Frazer
- MPS: Beaver MRA
- NRHP reference No.: 83003892
- Added to NRHP: November 29, 1983

The School House in Beaver, Utah, at 325 N. 200 West, was built probably in the 1870s by Scottish-born local stonemason Thomas Frazer. It was listed on the National Register of Historic Places in 1983.

It has also been known as the District #3 School House. It is a one-and-a-half-story building, made of black rock, which displays three of Frazer's stylistic characteristics: it uses ashlar stonework on the front facade, it has square-pointed mortar joints that were dyed white, and it has a Greek Revival-style cornice.

The building was converted to a house in the 1890s, with a frame extension to the rear then being added. Also a cinderblock shed was added, projecting to the rear, in the 1950s.
