= William H. Gruber =

American organizational theorist

William H. Gruber (born March 6, 1935) is an American organizational theorist, former professor at MIT, Boston College and Northeastern University, consultant and author, known for his work in the field of computer technology in business in the 1980s.

== Life and work ==
Gruber obtained his BS from the University of Pennsylvania in 1956, and his PhD in economics from Massachusetts Institute of Technology in 1965 with the thesis, entitled "Productivity. Education and Changes In the Labor Force."

Gruber had started his career in finance at the General Electric Company. After his graduation at MIT he became associate professor of accounting at Northeastern University, and started the consulting firm Research and Planning Institute in West Newton, Massachusetts. In 1971 at the Northeastern University's School of Business Administration, he became director of the university's Northeastern University Research Program on the Management of Science and Technology. He also held research positions at the M.I.T. Sloan School of Management and at Harvard Business School.

In the 1980s he moved to the MIT Sloan School of Management, where he was appointed assistant professor of management, and was "economic consultant to the study contractor for the research on government patent policy sponsored by the Committee on Government Patent Policy."

In the 1990s he was appointed as the chief information officer (CIO) at the Risk Management Foundation (RMF) of the Harvard Medical Institutions, sold his consultancy firm to AppNet Systems, Inc., and founded the Cambridge Innovation research (CIR). Gruber's experience in pharmaceutical industry strategy, management, and systems includes 25 years of consulting with Pfizer Pharmaceuticals in strategic information and public affairs.

Synnott and Gruber (1981) are credited to have coined the term chief information officer (CIO), and Gruber is credited to have coined the term global information officer (GIO).

== Selected publications ==
- Gruber, William H., and Donald G. Marquis, eds. Factors in the Transfer of Technology. MIT Press, 1969.
- Gruber, William H., and John S. Niles. "The New Management: Line Executive and Staff Professional in the Future Firm." McGraw Hill, 1976.
- Synnott, William R., and William H. Gruber. Information resource management: opportunities and strategies for the 1980s. John Wiley & Sons, Inc., 1981.
- Gruber, William H. "The Strategic Integration of Corporate Research and Development," New York American Management Association, 1981.
- Gruber, William H. "The Utilization of Specialists by Company Presidents," New York: The Presidents Association, 1975.

Articles, a selection

- Gruber, William H., and Raymond Vernon. "The technology factor in a world trade matrix." The technology factor in international trade. UMI, 1970. 233–302.
- Gruber, William H., and John S. Niles. "Problems in the utilization of management science/operations research: a state of the art survey." Interfaces 2.1 (1971): 12–19.
- Gruber, William., and Hoewing Raymond. "The New Management in Corporate Public Affairs," Public Affairs Review, 1980.
- Glenn, Martha CG., Gruber, William H. and Rabin, Kenneth A. "Using Computers in Corporate Public Affairs," Public Relations Review, 1982.
- Gruber, William H."Planning for the Next Market Break," Institutional Investor, December 1988.
- Gruber, William H. "Beyond Telecommuting: A New Paradigm for the Effect of Telecommunications and Travel,"(Report on Dr. Gruber's study of telemedicine), US Department of Energy, 1994.
- Gruber, William H. and Rosenthal, David S. "Managed Care has been good medicine; we don’t need micromanaged care", The Boston Globe, June 23, 1997.
- Gruber, William H., and David J. Hunter. "Transforming Osteoarthritis Care in an Era of Health Care Reform." Clinics in Geriatric Medicine, 2010. Volume 26, Issue 3, 433–444.
- Gruber, William H., Adam C. Powell, and John B. Torous. "The power of capturing and using information at the point of care." Healthcare, 2016.
