= Charles Dennis White House =

- U.S. National Register of Historic Places
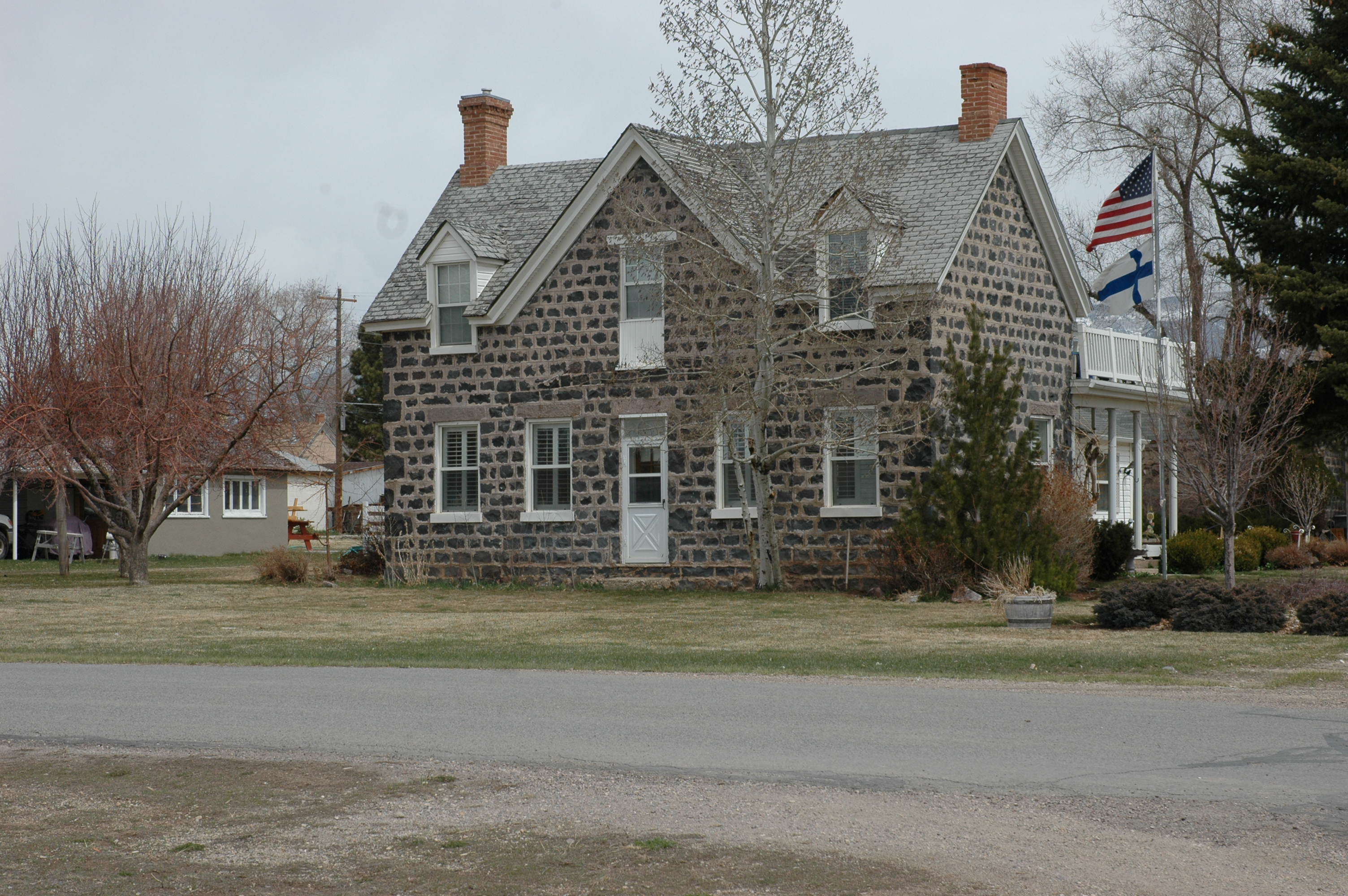

- Location within Utah Location within the United States
- Location: 115 E. 400 North St., Beaver, Utah
- Coordinates: 38°16′47″N 112°38′21″W
- Area: less than one acre
- Built: c.1882
- Built by: Thomas Frazer
- NRHP reference No.: 80003889
- Added to NRHP: February 14, 1980

The Charles Dennis White House, at 115 E. 400 North St. in Beaver, Utah, was built around 1882. It was listed on the National Register of Historic Places in 1980.

It was a work of stonemason Thomas Frazer. It is built of black rock (basalt) with gray granite lintels above doors and windows. Its front facade is symmetric with window-window-door-window-window openings. It has noticeably large quoins.

It is notable as the largest surviving work by Frazer. It has five of the six architectural elements common to Frazer's buildings: "dormer windows, a center gable, ashlar stonework, bargeboard along the eaves and dormers, and white-painted mortar joints." Inside, there is hand-painted graining on French doors to a music room. The property also includes an original granary.

It was built for one of polygamist Charles Dennis White's two families. White was a prominent citizen in Beaver, being a successful farmer and cattle and sheep herdsman, as well as superintendent of the large Beaver Co-op Store.
