= William R. Synnott =

American organizational theorist

- Born: December 29, 1929; Fall River, Massachusetts, United States
- Died: November 13, 2010 (aged 80)
- Other name: Bill Synnott
- Education: Boston University, Rutgers University, Harvard Business School
- Occupations: Organizational theorist, banker, and author
- Known for: Work in the field of computer technology in business and coining the term Chief Information Officer

William R. "Bill" Synnott (December 29, 1929 – November 13, 2010) was an American organizational theorist, Vice President of Bank of Boston, author, consultant and lecturer, known for his work in the field of computer technology in business in the 1980s.

== Early life ==
Born in Fall River, Massachusetts, to William and Marie (Labrie) Synnott in 1929, Synnott obtained his BA from Boston University, his MA from the Stonier Graduate School of Banking at Rutgers University, and his MBA at Harvard Business School in the 1950s.

== Career ==
Synnott came into prominence in the 1980s when he was head of Management Information Systems at the Bank of Boston, now BankBoston, where he coined the term chief information officer (CIO). In 1994 he retired at the Bank of Boston as vice president, and continued to work as consultant and lecturer, especially in Asia. At the Hong Kong Polytechnic University he developed their first MBA program.

In the 1980s Synnott became known for his work on computer technology in business. He wrote two books and a series of articles, and chaired the Boston Chapter of the Society for Information Management in 1982.

== Works ==
=== Total customer relationship, 1978 ===
In the 1978 article on "Total customer relationship." in MIS Quarterly Synnott argued that the "rapid growth of international banking in recent years has been accompanied by the growing problem of how to control the flow of vital management information, both customer and financial. The First of Boston's answer to this problem has been to develop, as a vital part of its international distributed processing network, a worldwide corporate MIS called the Total Customer Relationship system (TCR). TCR provides management with easily accessible, comprehensive information on dealings with multinational corporate customers around the world. This article describes the background and development of TCR, as well as the consolidated reports produced by the system."

=== Chief Information Officer ===
In the 1981 book "Information resource management" Synnott and Gruber (1981) coined the term chief information officer (CIO), and this concept became a popular management topic in the early 1980s. They had described the CIO as the "senior executive responsible for establishing corporate information policy, standards, and management control over all corporate information resources."

In their vision the CIO was "a senior-level executive responsible for overseeing network and data processing operations, and crafting an information systems strategy that would help a corporation achieve its business objectives through the innovative use of technology."

In 1989 Eckerson noticed, that "only about 10% of Fortune 500 companies have put in place a ClO- type executive, according to William Gruber."

=== The Information Weapon, 1987 ===
In the 1987 book "The Information Weapon: Winning Customers and Markets With Technology" Synnott wanted to show "how to use information technology as a competitive strategy instead of just a back shop cost-cutting tool and describes how information systems managers and chief information officers can help lead this change. Provides over 65 information weapon strategies that readers can use in their own companies."

Furthermore, "by presenting frameworks for planning and strategic systems models, the book teaches readers to search for and identify 'weapon' opportunities and shows how companies in the service industries can use information technology as a revenue generator. Unlike any other text on the subject, it describes what information resource architecture is all about and lends a clearer understanding of what the new chief information officer role entails. Essentially, the book offers a framework for thinking that will help managers search for technological opportunities within their area and then win with that technology."

=== Business architecture ===
Information Resource Management architecture by Synnott, 1987

In the 1987 The Information Weapon, Synnott was one of the first to describe and picture the concept of business architecture. He defined business architecture as:

"... the foundation upon which the IRM architecture rests. The architectural model consists of a set of building-blocks of linked architectures which together form the basis for the technology infrastructure of the firm."

In this context Synnott also spoke about the role of data architecture and communication architecture. He explained, that:

"... data architecture and communication architecture are shown as horizontal bars because these are corporate-wide information resource components. They serve all business units. The four vertical resource components are business specific. The resources can be divided according to the business units they serve. That us, data and communication might be centralizes resources, whereas human resources (professional systems staffs), computers, user-computing, and systems could all be decentralized resources to one degree or another."

== Selected publications ==
- Synnott, William R., and William H. Gruber. Information resource management: opportunities and strategies for the 1980s. John Wiley & Sons, Inc., 1981.
- Synnott, William R. The information weapon: winning customers and markets with technology. John Wiley & Sons Inc, 1987.

Articles, a selection:

- Synnott, W. R. "Total customer relationship." MIS Quarterly(1978): 15–24.
- Synnott, William R. "Changing roles for information managers." Computerworld 15.38 (1981): 19–28.
- Synnott, William R. "The information weapon." Winning Customers and Markets with Technology (1987).
- Synnott, William R. "The emerging chief information officer." Information Management Review 3.1 (1987): 21–35.
