= Farnworth (surname) =

Farnworth is a surname of English origin. It is of connected origin to the surname Farnsworth, but has been dated back further than that of the latter. The oldest known record for the name appeared in Lancashire in 1185 in modern-day Farnworth, known then as Farnworth with Kearsley. The first chief for the Farnworth family clan, was a nobleman named Leinsig de Farnworth who came from Germany and was granted land by King Henry II of England.

The word Farnworth is a combination of two words; the old-English word fearn (which refers to ferns such as bracken) and worth (meaning a settlement). The full meaning of the surname is described as settlers from a place where ferns are abundant.

As of the British Census of 1881, its occurrence was high in Lancashire, Cumbria, Cheshire and Northumberland. In all other British counties, its frequency was --and still is--very low.

== People ==
- John Farnworth (born 1988), English football freestyler
- Mike Farnworth (born 1959), Canadian politician
- Norman Farnsworth (1930–2011), American pharmacognosist, pharmacologist, and author
- Oliver Farnworth (born 1982), English actor who found fame through Hollyoaks
- Philo Farnsworth (1906-1971), American inventor
- Richard Farnworth (died 1666), English Quaker minister and writer
- Simon Farnworth (born 1963), English football goalkeeper who played for Lancashire clubs

== Places ==
- Farnworth, a small town near Bolton, Greater Manchester

== Other ==
- Farnworth parliament constituency, a defunct county constituency in Lancashire

== See also ==
- Farnworth, Greater Manchester
- Phaneuf (surname)
