= Julia P. M. Farnsworth Barn =

- U.S. National Register of Historic Places
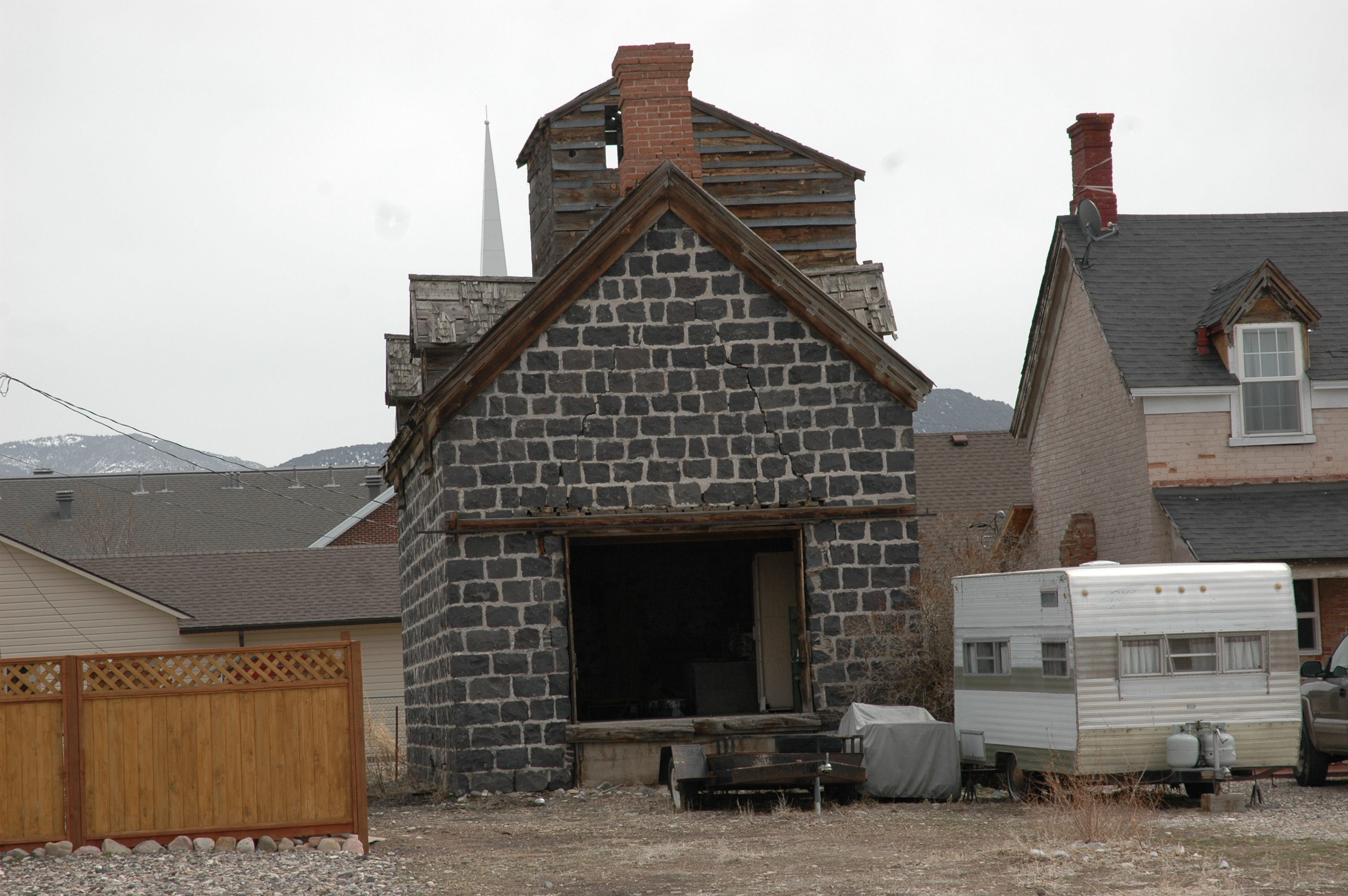

- Location within Utah Location within the United States
- Location: 180 W. Center St. (rear), Beaver, Utah
- Coordinates: 38°16′28″N 112°38′36″W
- Area: 0.1 acres (0.040 ha)
- Built: 1880
- Built by: Thomas Frazer
- MPS: Beaver MRA
- NRHP reference No.: 82004085
- Added to NRHP: September 17, 1982

The Julia P.M. Farnsworth Barn, at the rear of 180 W. Center St. in Beaver, Utah, was built around 1880. It was listed on the National Register of Historic Places in 1982, as was the Julia Farnsworth House at the front of the property.

It is a work of local black rock stonemason Thomas Frazer, who possibly also built the house in front. In 1982 the barn was in excellent condition. It is notable as the only stone barn in Beaver, and further

It is quite large and not only is its craftsmanship of the highest caliber, but its design is quite pleasing. While stone granaries are very common in Beaver, a stone barn is very unusual. It is a barn built by Thomas Frazer, the local Scots stonemason, and it displays four of the six characteristics commonly employed by Frazer in his work: 1) ashlar stonework, 2) dormer windows 3) white Dainted beaded mortar joints, 4) bargeboard around the eaves and dormers.

Its Utah State inventory document further reports:

This black stone barn is exceptional for many reasons: 1) the stone has been cut and laid up in courses on all four sides, rather than the customary two sides; 2) it is one of the few buildings in Beaver to display any Gothic motifs; 3) its original function was a barn, yet it has dormer windows and decorative Gothic Revival bargeboard; 4) the stonework is excellent and displays the "Frazer characteristics", i.e. beaded mortar joints that were once painted white and finely hewn black rock blocks (basalt) that were put up with black dyed mortar around the edges to give them an even squarer appearance. Oddly, the chimney on the barn, which appears to have been original due to the type of brick and style, does not connect to a flue or fireplace of any sort.

It was later used as a grain mill, "where grain was chopped and ground by R.C. Murdock."

== See also ==
- Julia Farnsworth House, also NRHP-listed
