= Emma Justine Farnsworth =

American photographer (1860–1952)

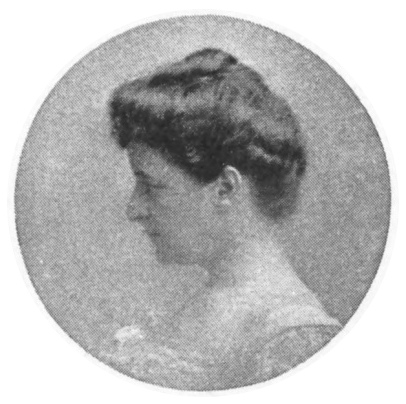
- Born: November 16, 1860; New York, U.S.
- Died: January 23, 1952 (aged 91); Albany, New York, U.S.
- Known for: Photography

Emma Justine Farnsworth (October 16, 1860–January 23, 1952) was an American photographer from Albany, New York known for her pictorialist photogravures and scenes illustrating children's literature.

== Biography ==
Born in New York, Farnsworth was the daughter of Civil War general, Jonathan Gosman Farnsworth, and Sara Visscher Gourlay.

== Career ==
Farnsworth had training in the arts. After receiving her first camera as a gift in 1890, she began photographing seriously within a few months. She joined the Society of Amateur Photographers in New York City since the local amateur groups in Albany did not allow women as members.

As a member of The Camera Club of New York, Farnsworth's photographs were featured in In Arcadia (1892), a book of figure studies accompanied by Classical verse, published by another member, George M. Allen. Her photographs were exhibited at the World's Columbian Exposition (1893). Before the end of the decade, she had been awarded almost 30 medals at various exhibitions in the world, and her work appeared frequently in the noted periodical Camera Notes, the journal of the Camera Club of New York, edited primarily by Alfred Stieglitz.

Her photographs were displayed in 1893 at the Sixth Joint Annual Exhibition (which presented work by 187 photographers from New York, Boston, and Philadelphia) at the Pennsylvania Academy of Fine Arts. In a review of the exhibition from the American Amateur Photographer, Stieglitz remarked that Farnsworth was one of only a few American photographers who received a medal for her submissions. He regarded them highly, writing that "Every one of her pictures is full of life and artistic quality, bold in conception and execution." Stieglitz further characterized Farnsworth's photos as "unaffected and full of individuality." Her work was included in the Paris Exposition (1900). Her specialties were genre and figure studies, especially children and animals. She exhibited internationally, and was included in the show, American Women Photographers, organized by Frances Benjamin Johnston, and presented at the Paris Exposition in 1900. She died in Albany, New York on January 23, 1952, aged 92.

"My work is generally in the open air, with having to go miles sometimes for the proper backgrounds, wind, time of day and sun—all to be considered—and the right model."

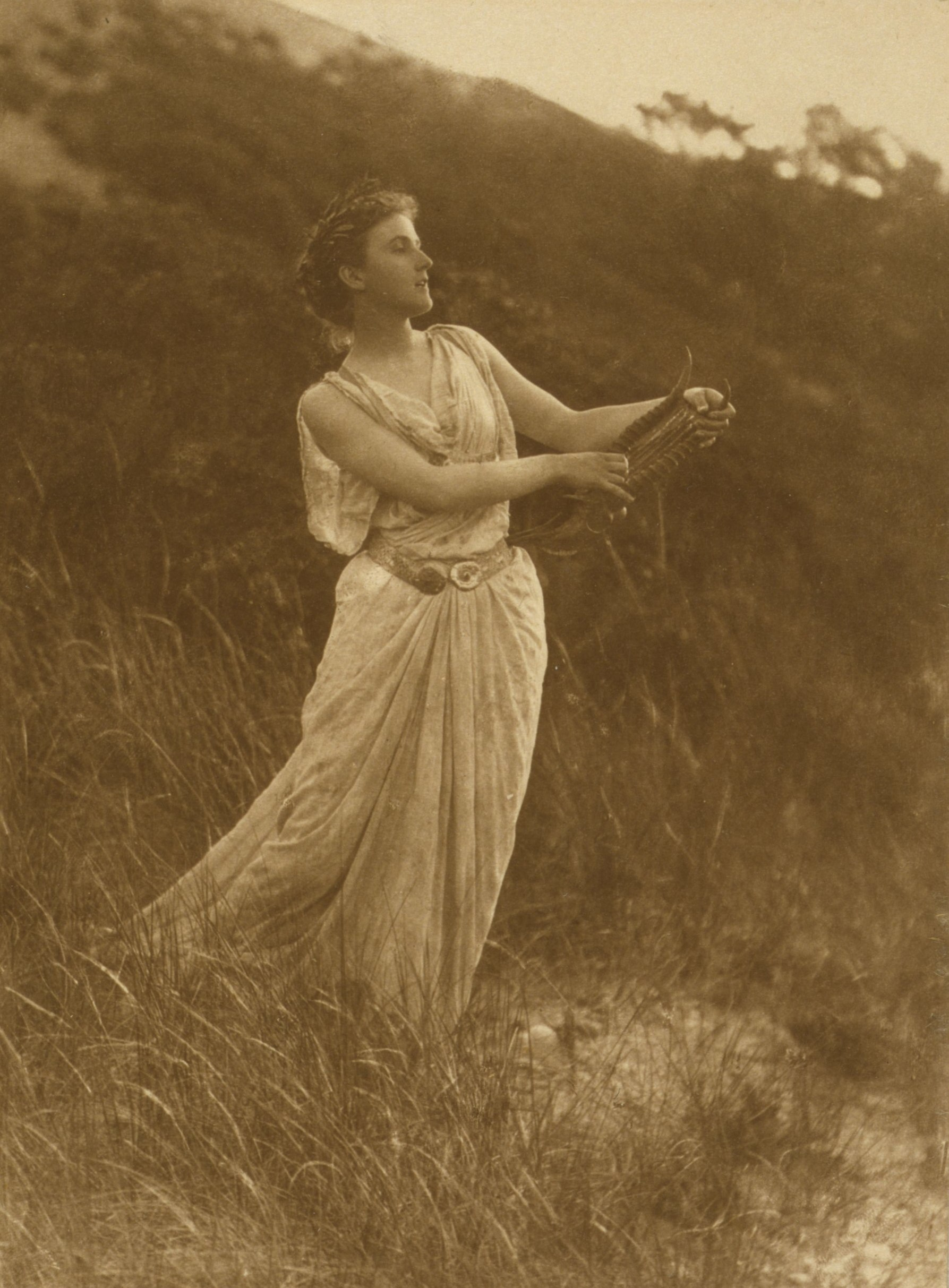
To a Greek Girl

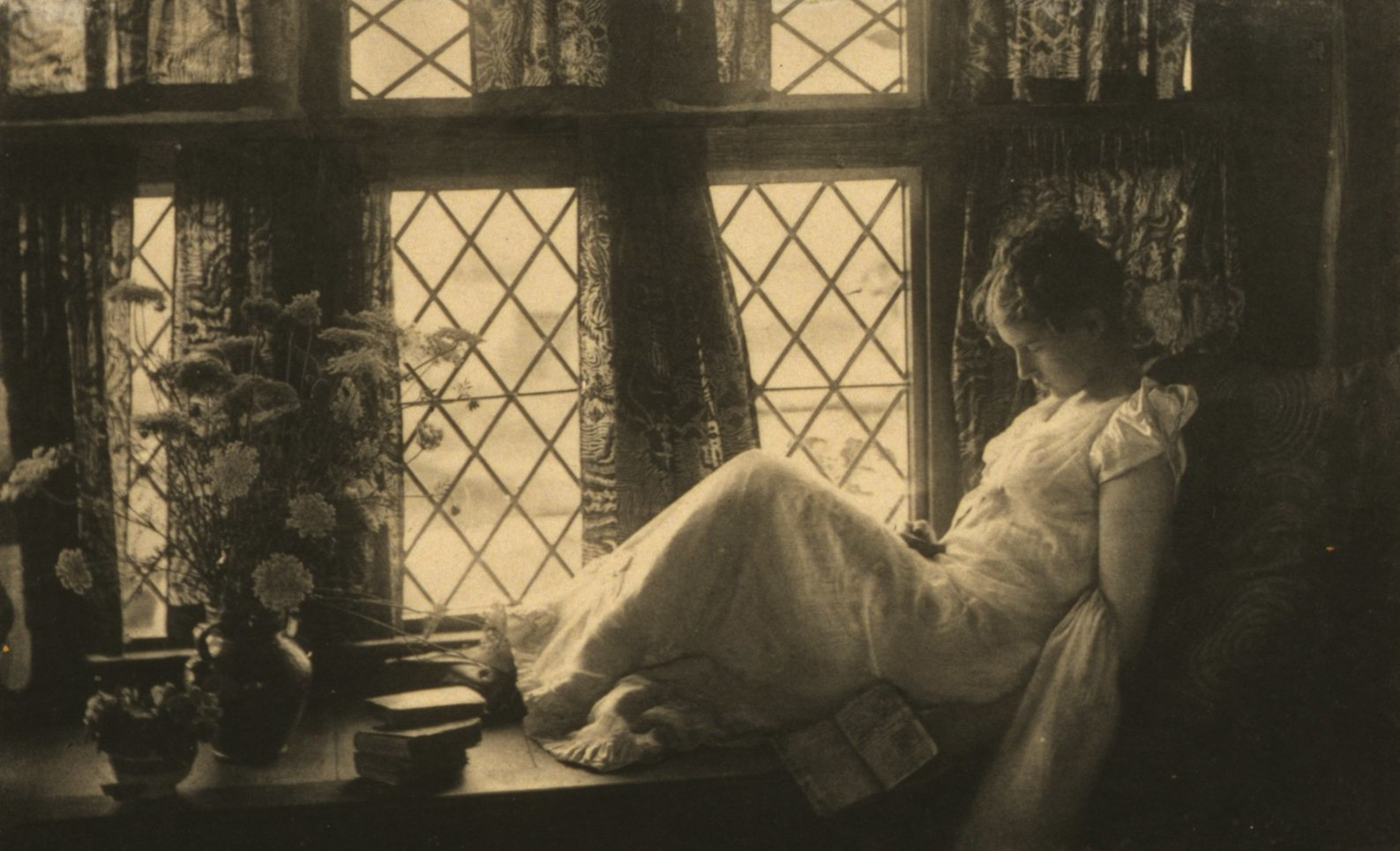
At Dusk

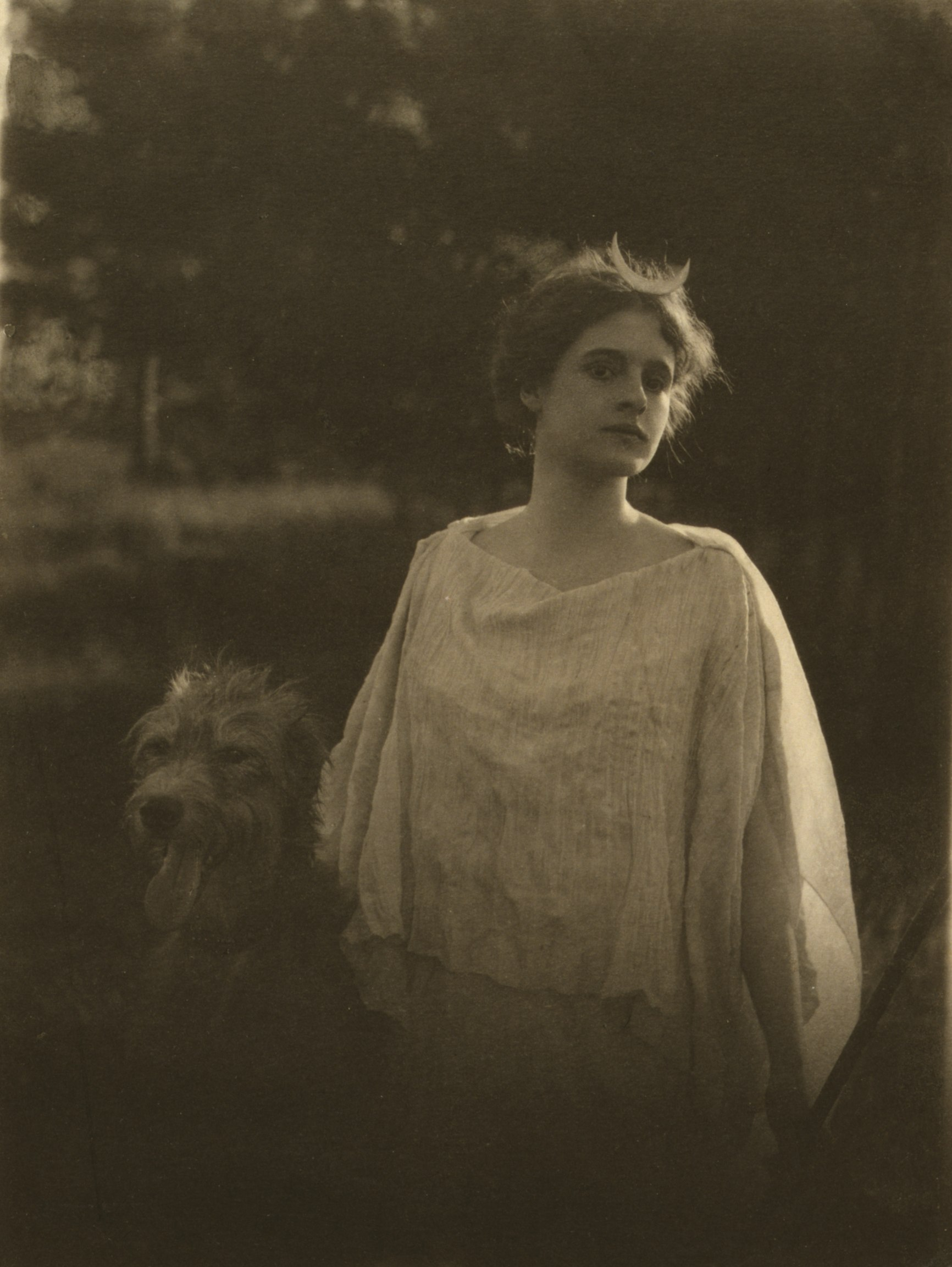
Diana
