= Albert Paul Weiss =

German American behavioral psychologist

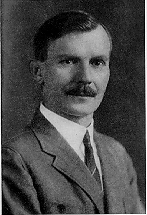
- Born: September 15, 1879; Steingrund, Germany
- Died: April 3, 1931 (age 51)
- Education: University of Missouri
- Occupation: Professor of Experimental Psychology
- Known for: behaviorism and linguistics

Albert Paul Weiss (September 15, 1879 – April 3, 1931) was a German American behavioral psychologist, theorist, scientist, and experimentalist. He was born in Steingrund, Germany. His family moved to the United States shortly after his birth and lived in St. Louis, MO. He was raised in a household of scholarly and philosophical interests although neither of his parents were highly educated. He attended University of Missouri for both undergraduate and graduate school and eventually earned his PhD there in 1916. Weiss initially planned on majoring in physics, mathematics, and philosophy until he was inspired by his professor Max Meyer to become a psychologist. After earning his PhD, he went to Ohio State University where he did research and taught up until his death. While in school, Weiss became interested in the physiological and sociological aspects of philosophy. He was interested in the role of language in human behavior and used biology, physics, and chemistry to examine human behaviors. He died of heart disease in 1931.

== Professional accomplishments ==
As a scientist, Weiss emphasized the importance of applying scientific methods to studying non-physical concepts. He used his scientific background to change how psychological research methods were previously done. Weiss redefined the subject manner and problem being studied in more scientific terms. His language studies were one of the first of the time and as a result he is highly regarded by the Linguistic Society of America. In 1918 he was named Professor of Experimental Psychology, a title that he held until his death. He became the president of the Ohio Academy of Science in 1922 and also went on to become president of the Midwestern Psychological Association in 1929. He was a member of many academic societies including Phi Beta Kappa, Sigma Xi, Phi Delta Kappa, and Alpha Psi Delta. He was also an associate editor for The Journal of General Psychology.

== Role in behavioral psychology ==
Weiss published A Theoretical Basis of Human Behavior in 1925 and went on to publish a second edition in 1929. He was interested in studying human achievement and how people respond to external stimuli. His method of studying human behavior was considered to be overzealous and radical in comparison to traditional behaviorists. He defined human behaviorism as the reason for human achievement. This is why he believed the study of human behavior needed to be done in a carefully constructed scientific manner. He found previous traditional forms of psychological research methods to be insufficient. Weiss believed the current psychological methodology of his time unfitting to study behaviorism because the main focus was physical and mental phenomena instead of the biological and social aspects that he thought were more important. His unparalleled attention to detail in his behavior studies is one of the main reasons why people today regard him as a radical behaviorist.

Weiss wanted to understand human behavior through a materialist and monist perspective. Specifically, he thought that human behavior and achievement could be combined to create one physical element. One of the ways he did this was by conducting biophysical and biosocial experiments to determine if there were physical changes in the body when a person had a biosocial response to external stimuli. He explained that biosocial responses were different from biophysical because it referred to one’s social (as opposed to physical) response to a stimulus. He further analyzed the results of his studies on an atomic level to further support his monist theories.

=== Language ===
Even though Weiss is considered to be a behaviorist, he did not want to call himself or any of his students one because of its limiting title. The most notable contribution Weiss made to behaviorism is his studies on language. Weiss found language to be the ultimate form of behavior because it combines mental thought processes with physical processes occurring in the nervous system. Weiss found that when responding to a stimulus, a vocal response is produced. The system of vocal responses is what makes language according to Weiss. Language acts as a way for people to relay their nervous system responses to each other. For Weiss, it is impossible to study behavior without language because they interconnected. Language lends to characteristics and interactions that are a reflection of what is happening in one’s nervous system. Since Weiss was a materialist, he wanted to prove that language, a non-tactile thing, does have material origins.

== Role in other sciences ==
=== Biological sciences ===
Weiss started his behavioral studies by examining the human bodies and embryos. Before him, no other researcher questioned what was parts of the nervous system were inherited and which (if any) were developed later on. He examined the anatomical central nervous system of various embryos to compare to human ones. He found that all human infants are born with the same sensori-motor pathways that make up the nervous system. However, the pathways that do not deal with mental functioning such as breathing or digestion mature later on.

Weiss also compared the anatomical structures of humans and animals in order to establish proof that the reason why human and animals have different behaviors is because of their anatomy. He concluded that humans are capable of having biosocial responses and animals are not. Animals are unable to have biosocial responses due to limitations in their sensory organs.

=== Physics ===
In order to explain the production of language, Weiss looked at the production of sound coming from the nervous system’s “speakers." Weiss was one of the first to extensively study the role of acoustics in psychology. He and a group of graduate students designed an apparatus meant to produce pure tones, control tone intensity, and control phase relations. The purpose of experiments using this apparatus was to determine how different types of sounds are produced and how they relate to each other. He also wanted to determine the threshold (limen) for intensities that can be perceived while measuring the amplification of the intensity.

== Philosophies ==
=== Mind-body problem ===
Before becoming a scientist, Weiss was interested in philosophy. He sought to use his materialist and monist views to explain questions regarding the mind that were still being debated. He criticized psychologists for avoiding the mind-body problem and believed that using psychology was not enough to fully understand it. He used mechanics as an analogy to explain his understanding of the mind-body problem. He compared the mind to the pressure of a car steering wheel, which is able to change directions when the car is in motion. From there, he realized that there were internal and external conditions that were beyond our capabilities to perceive.

=== Consciousness ===
Weiss narrowed consciousness down to three elements: sensations, images, and feelings. These elements had psychical properties that were able to attribute to physical properties. The elements of physical properties were quality, intensity, extent and duration. Very few psychologists agreed with Weiss' physical elements. Weiss believed defining consciousness as experience was lacking because there was no way to expand upon this definition. Weiss proposed that consciousness was a motion, tying back into his automobile analogy.

== Publications ==
Weiss has been widely published on a national and global scale. His first published work, A Theoretical Basis of Human Behavior, consisted mostly of his theoretical essays. After its publication, Weiss felt it was incomplete and later came out with a second edition of A Theoretical Basis of Human Behavior in 1929 which was an expansion and revision on the first edition. His studies have also been published in Journal of General Psychology, where he was an associate editor, and The Psychologies of 1930. He also published Psychological Monograph, which discussed his work in acoustics and included the patents of his sound apparatus. After observing infant anatomy, he wrote The Behavior of the Newborn Infant. One of the most unusual works that Weiss wrote was Psychological Principles of Automotive Driving, based on his studies done on human-machine relationships.
