= Lyman W. Porter =

American psychologist (1930–2015)

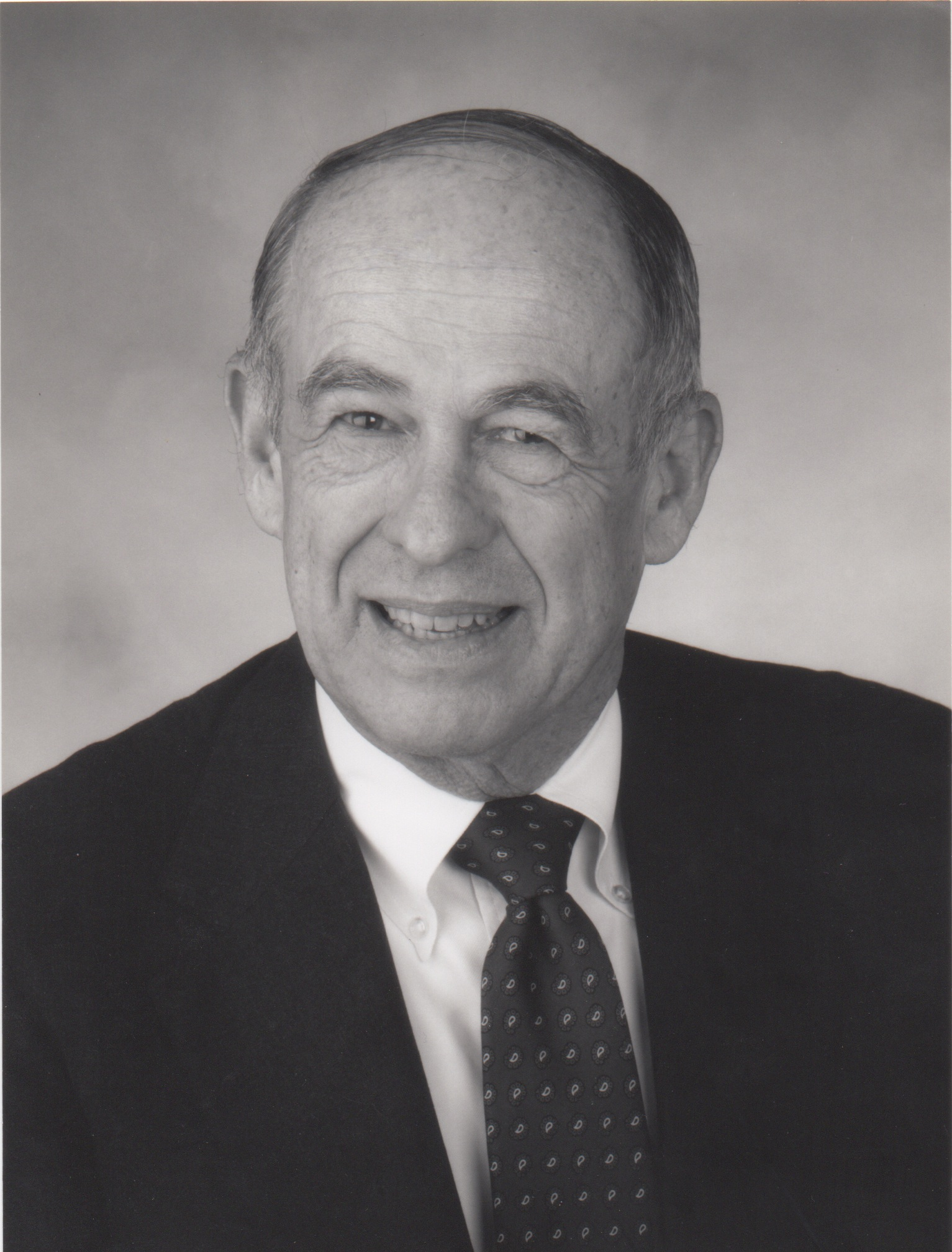
- Born: 1930; Lafayette, Indiana, U.S.
- Died: July 2, 2015; Newport Beach, California, U.S.
- Spouse: Meredith Anne
- Children: 1 son, 1 daughter
- Parent(s): Charles Lyman Porter; Mary Allen

Academic background
- Education: Northwestern University; Yale University
- Thesis: A Study Of The Effects Of Rewards On Associative Connections (1956)
- Doctoral advisor: Carl Hovland

Lyman William Porter (c. 1930 – July 2, 2015) was an American academic administrator. He was the dean of the Paul Merage School of Business at the University of California, Irvine from 1972 to 1983. He was the co-author of many books of management, and "one of the primary founders of the study of organizational behavior."

== Early life ==
Lyman William Porter was born in 1930 in Lafayette, Indiana. His father, Charles Lyman Porter, was a professor of biology at Purdue University.

Porter graduated from Northwestern University, where he earned a bachelor's degree in 1952, and he received a Ph.D. in psychology from Yale University in 1956.

== Career ==
Porter began his career in the Psychology department at the University of California, Berkeley. He joined the University of California, Irvine as assistant dean of its Paul Merage School of Business in 1967, and served as the dean from 1972 to 1983.

Porter was the president of the Society for Industrial and Organizational Psychology from 1975 to 1976. With Mark Rosenzweig, he was the co-editor of the Annual Review of Psychology from 1974 to 1994. He was a founding trustee of the American University of Armenia.

Porter was "one of the primary founders of the study of organizational behavior," and he "played a major role in ensuring that organizational behavior would become an important component of modern business education." He retired from academia in 1992.

== Personal life, death and legacy ==
Porter married Meredith Anne; they had one son and a daughter. They resided in Newport Beach, California.

Porter died on July 2, 2015, in Newport Beach, California, at the age of 85. He is the namesake of the Dr. Lyman W. Porter Colloquium Room at UC Irvine.

== Selected works ==
- Haire, Mason; Ghiselli, Edwin E.; Porter, Lyman W. (1966). Managerial Thinking: An International Study. New York: Wiley. OCLC 229602.
- Porter, Lyman W.; Lawler, Edward E. III (1968). Managerial Attitudes and Performance. Homewood, Illinois: R. D. Irwin. OCLC 243614.
- Porter, Lyman W.; Lawler, Edward E. III; Hackman, J. Richard (1974). Behavior in Organizations. New York: McGraw-Hill. ISBN 9780070505278. OCLC 898052.
- Steers, Richard M.; Porter, Lyman W. (1975). Motivation and Work Behavior. New York: McGraw-Hill. ISBN 9780070609402. OCLC 1121255.
- Hackman, J. Richard; Lawler, Edward E. III; Porter, Lyman W., eds. (1977). Perspectives on Behavior in Organizations. New York: McGraw-Hill. ISBN 9780070254138. OCLC 2542495.
- Mowday, Richard T.; Lyman, Porter W.; Steers, Richard M. (1982). Employee-organization Linkages: The Psychology of Commitment, Absenteeism, and Turnover. New York: Academic Press. ISBN 9780125093705. OCLC 7924834.
- Porter, Lyman W.; McKibbin, Lawrence E. (1988). Management Education and Development: Drift or Thrust into the 21st Century?. New York: McGraw-Hill. ISBN 9780070505216. OCLC 17551842.
- Porter, Lyman W.; Angle, Harold L.; Allen, Robert W., eds. (2003). Organizational Influence Processes. Armonk, New York: M.E. Sharpe. ISBN 9780765611345. OCLC 50638478.
- Hitt, Michael A.; Black, Stewart; Porter, Lyman W. (2005). Management. Upper Saddle River, New Jersey: Pearson Prentice Hall. ISBN 9780130088475. OCLC 56413645.
