= E. L. Farnsworth =

American politician

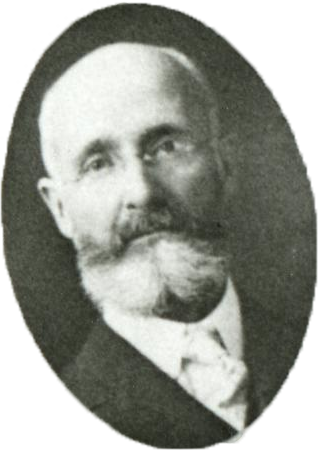
- Farnsworth in 1913

Member of the Washington House of Representatives from the 16th district
- In office 1909–1919

Personal details
- Born: January 8, 1863 Sanilac County, Michigan, United States
- Died: January 7, 1940 (aged 76) Olympia, Washington, United States
- Party: Democratic

Edward Lewis Farnsworth (January 8, 1863 – January 7, 1940) was an American politician in the state of Washington. He served in the Washington House of Representatives.
