= Julia Farnsworth House =

- U.S. National Register of Historic Places
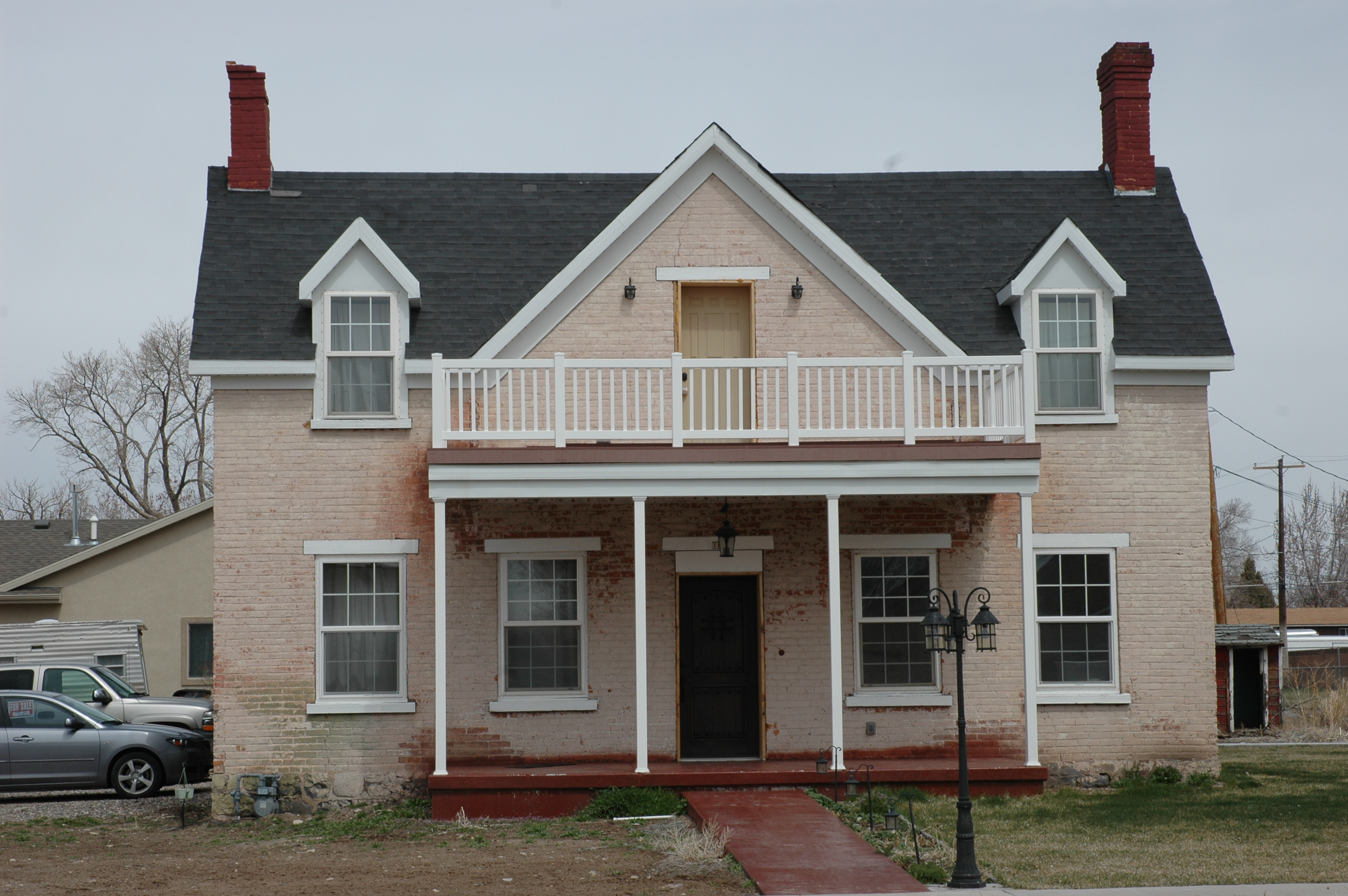

- Location within Utah Location within the United States
- Location: 180 W. Center St., Beaver, Utah
- Coordinates: 38°16′28″N 112°38′36″W
- Area: less than one acre
- Built: c.1885
- Built by: Thomas Frazer
- MPS: Beaver MRA
- NRHP reference No.: 82004086
- Added to NRHP: September 17, 1982

The Julia Farnsworth House, at 180 W. Center St. in Beaver, Utah, was built around 1885. It was listed on the National Register of Historic Places in 1982.

It is a brick house, with brick laid in common bond, with dormer windows and eaves trimmed by bargeboards. Its windows are large, 6 panes over 6 panes, and have wooden lintels. It was built as a T-shaped house, and altered later by addition of porches on its northeast and northwest sides. The original transom over the front door has been blocked up.

It was probably built by Thomas Frazer, a local stonemason who is more known for his work with black rock, including the Julia P.M. Farnsworth Barn just behind. The house does have three of six characteristics associated with Frazer's works, in that it has dormer windows, bargeboard and a center gable.

The house was deemed significant for its historic age, its relatively unaltered condition, and as "an excellent example of a nicely designed vernacular house."

== See also ==
- Julia P.M. Farnsworth Barn, also NRHP-listed
