= Calvin Perry Stone =

American psychologist

- Born: February 28, 1892; Jay County, Indiana
- Died: December 28, 1954 (aged 62)
- Scientific career
- Fields: Psychology

Calvin Perry Stone (February 28, 1892 – December 28, 1954) was an American psychologist, known for his work in comparative and physiological psychology. He was also a past president of the American Psychological Association (APA) and a member of the National Academy of Sciences (NAS).

== Early life ==
Stone was born on February 28, 1892, on a farm in Jay County, Indiana. He was the seventh of Ezekiel and Emily Brinkerhoff Stone's eight children, the youngest boy. Stone's father died when he was 5 years old, and while the family was at the funeral, their house burned down. This resulted in years of struggle for his family, teaching Stone the potential that can result from great effort.

While the only book in the family library was the Bible, Stone and his siblings received encouragement to pursue higher learning from family and the social environment, as well as practical support from their mother. Stone began school at the age of 6, and by age 15 began studying at Valparaiso University. He obtained his bachelor of science in 3 years (1910), and began teaching at a local high school. While teaching he continued to take summer courses and obtained a bachelor of arts in classics from the same university (1913).

== Education and military service ==
Stone earned his master's, under the guidance of Melvin Haggerty, at Indiana University Bloomington. Haggerty then encouraged Stone to join him in his move to the University of Minnesota, where Stone began his doctoral work. During his early years as a doctoral student Stone also accepted a position as director of research at the Indiana State Reformatory, which he held until his entrance into the Army. During this time Stone also married his wife, Minnie Ruth Kemper, whom he had met at Valparaiso.

Stone entered Officer's Candidate School in August 1917, where his knowledge of Psychology was quickly recognized. He became a psychological examiner at Camp Taylor in Louisville, Kentucky, where he caught the attention of Robert Yerkes. Stone went on to become that adjunct and assistant director of training at Camp Greenleaf in Chattanooga Tennessee, eventually being discharged having attained the rank of captain.

After leaving the Army Stone returned to the University of Minnesota to complete his doctoral work. However, he was then under the advisement of Karl Lashley, while also working with A.T. Rasmussen, a professor of Anatomy. He received his Ph.D. in 1921, and during that time he also had 2 sons James (1918) and Robert (1920).

== Academic career ==
Shortly after obtaining his Ph.D. Stone began teaching at the University of Minnesota, but within a year received an offer from the chairman of the psychology department to begin teaching at Stanford University.

Stone remained primarily at Stanford for the remainder of his career. While he did receive other offers, Stone remained committed to teaching and research. His course on Freudian Psychology at Stanford was the first comprehensive class of its kind in an American University.

Stone's research interests focused around the nervous system and glandular mechanisms, his main contributions relating to the relationship between physiological mechanisms and reproductive behavior. He was known to be incredibly thorough in his research, exploring all facets of his research questions. His interest in linking abnormal behavior to physiological psychology led to a number of animal and human studies. His experiments ranged from maze learning in rats to exploration of physical and mental development in humans during puberty. One of his final studies was to study the effects of electroconvulsive shock, a technique he had seen during one of his sabbatical periods.

== Additional opportunities ==
In 1928 Stone took a sabbatical year and spent time at the Institute for Juvenile Research in Chicago, Illinois. He also took a trip to Europe to attend the 1932 International Congress of Psychology in Oxford. In 1945, he spent the year in New York at the Psychiatric Institute, where he began his research on electroconvulsive shock.

One of his main contributions to psychology on a national level was his participation on the seven-member Subcommittee on Survey and Planning of the Emergency Committee. This opportunity arose from his time spent working with the chair of the committee, Robert Yerkes, in World War I. This committee proposed the unification of psychology at the national level, suggesting an Intersociety Constitutional Convention, that resulted in a meeting in 1943. That convention, under the leadership of E.G. Boring, concluded that the American Psychological Association should remain the overall national organization, however, also suggested a divisional structure to introduce a certain level of independence for a number of specialized interests.

== Appointments and honors ==
· 1931-1932: President of Western Psychological Association

· 1938-1939: Vice President of the American Association for Advancement of Science

· 1941-1942: President of APA

· 1943: Elected to the National Academy of Science

=== Editor ===
· 1947-1950: Journal of Comparative & Physiological Psychology

· 1950–1954: Annual Review of Psychology

· 1951: Comparative Psychology

=== Publications ===
Master's Thesis (1921): “Notes on light discrimination in the dog”

Doctoral Dissertation (1921): “An experimental analysis of the congenital sexual behavior of the male Albino rat”

Between 1922 and 1946 Stone and his research associates published 34 reports on sexual and maternal behavior in the albino rat. During this period Stone also conducted studies on learning, maturation, and incentive motivation using mazes and an apparatus to study discrimination.

Stone also published 8 papers between 1927 and 1939 addressing the physical and mental development in humans during puberty and adolescence.

Fourteen papers were published between 1946 and 1956, including one posthumously, on Stone's work on the effects of electroconvulsive shock.
