= BT (wealth management) =

Australian financial services company

Coordinates: 33.866318°S 151.204190°E

BT Financial Group
- Type: Subsidiary of Westpac
- Industry: Wealth Management
- Founded: 1969
- Headquarters: Sydney, Australia
- Area served: Australia, New Zealand
- Products: Wealth management
- AUM: A$46 billion (2022)
- Website: www.bt.com.au

BT, formerly BT Financial Group, is a financial-services company based at Tower Two, International Towers, Sydney, with operations in both Australia and New Zealand.

In 1969, BT began as the Australian subsidiary of the Bankers Trust Company of New York, Bankers Trust Australia.

In 2002, Principal Financial Group sold BT Financial Group for $900 million to Westpac, an Australian banking and financial services company.

== See also ==
- Banking in Australia
- List of banks in Australia
