= Meeting Hall (Beaver, Utah) =

Historic church in Utah, United States

- U.S. National Register of Historic Places
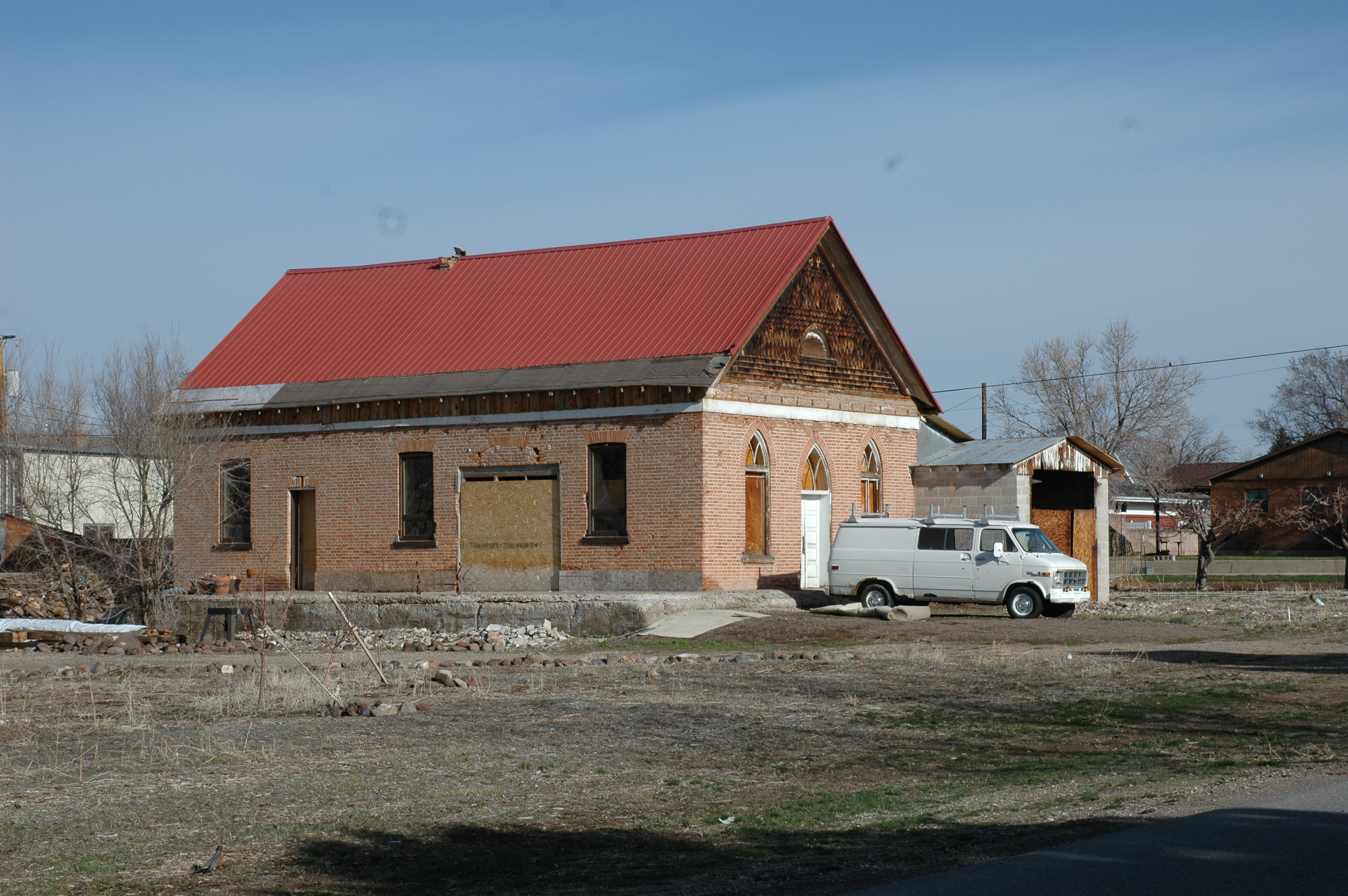

- Location within Utah Location within the United States
- Location: 1st North and 3rd East, Beaver, Utah
- Coordinates: 38°16′34″N 112°38′10″W
- Area: less than one acre
- Built: 1909
- MPS: Beaver MRA
- NRHP reference No.: 82004094
- Added to NRHP: September 17, 1982

The Meeting Hall is a building at 1st North and 3rd East in Beaver, Utah, that was built in 1909. It was property of the Beaver Relief Society.

It was listed on the National Register of Historic Places in 1982. At the time of its listing it was "in great need of maintenance" yet "still very interesting": it is a brick building with an unusual-for-Beaver Flemish bond pattern, and has other unusual characteristics, according to its historic site nomination.

This building is different from the Beaver Relief Society Meetinghouse, located nearby at 35 N. 1st East. That building is also NRHP-listed and currently serves as the town's firehouse.
