= Beaver Relief Society Meetinghouse =

- U.S. National Register of Historic Places
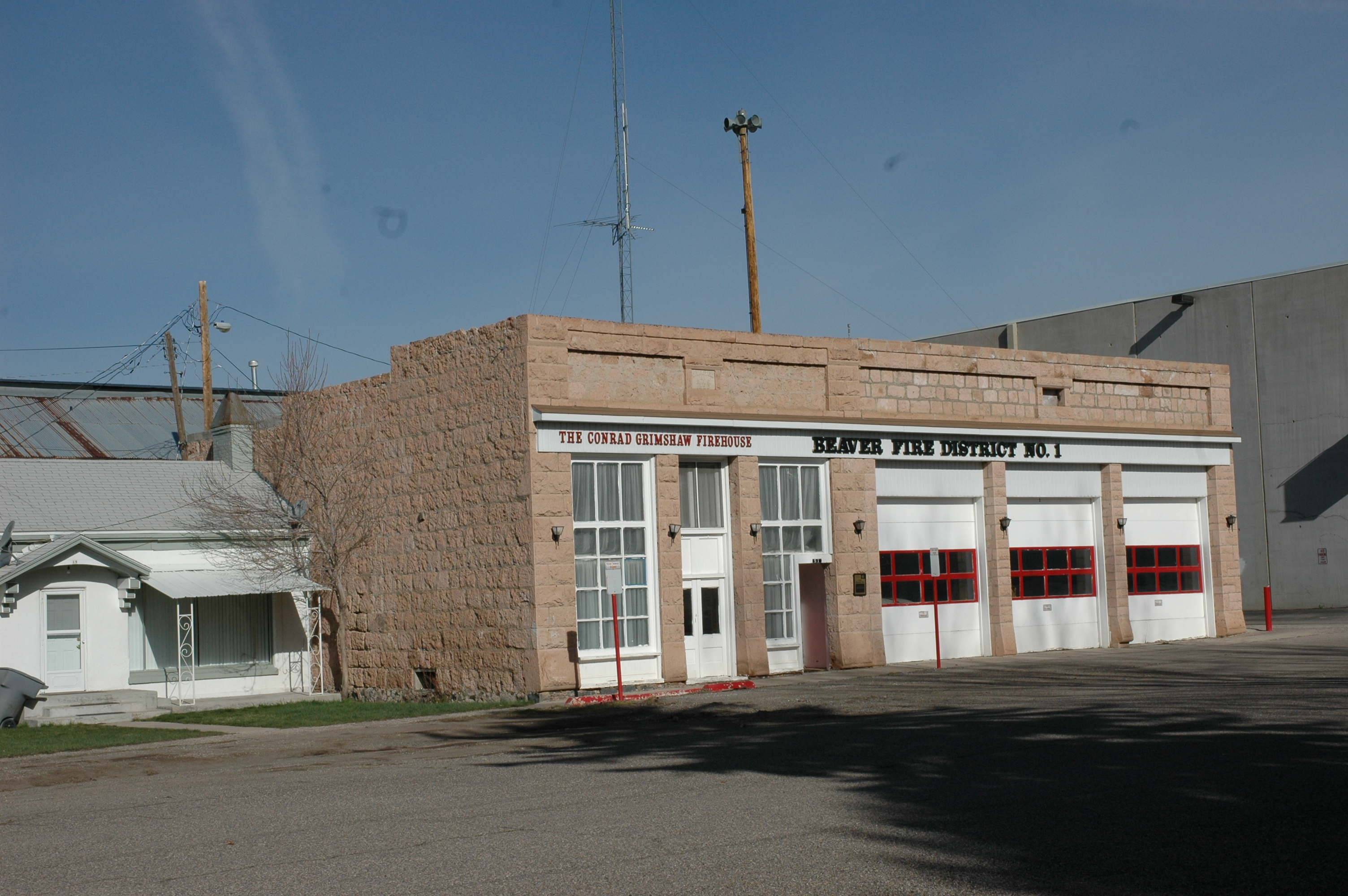

- Location within Utah Location within the United States
- Location: 35 N. 1st East, Beaver, Utah
- Coordinates: 38°16′29″N 112°38′23″W
- Area: less than one acre
- Built: 1896
- MPS: Beaver MRA
- NRHP reference No.: 83003837
- Added to NRHP: November 29, 1983

The Beaver Relief Society Meetinghouse, located at 35 N. 1st East in Beaver, Utah, was built in 1896. It has served as a religious structure, a meeting hall, and a civic building. Since 1977, it has served as Beaver's fire station.

It is a tallish building made of tuff (pink rock) that was built for the Beaver Relief Society, the women's organization of the Church of Jesus Christ of Latter-day Saints. It was listed on the National Register of Historic Places (NHRP) in 1983.

It is a different building from the Beaver Relief Society's Meeting Hall, which is located nearby and which is also on the NHRP.
