= James Fennemore House =

- U.S. National Register of Historic Places
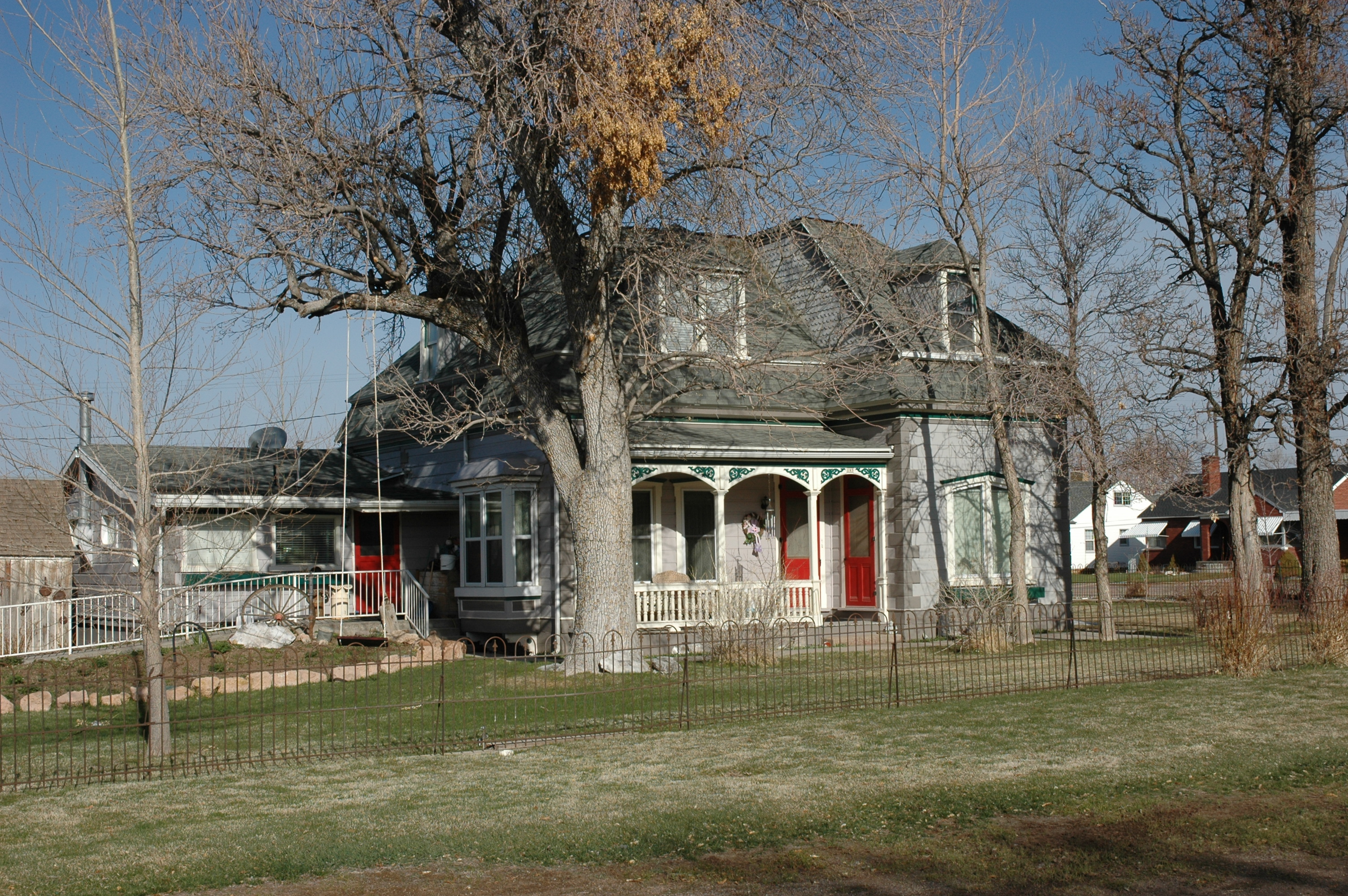
- James Fennemore House, Beaver, Utah

- Location within Utah Location within the United States
- Location: 195 N. 2nd East, Beaver, Utah
- Coordinates: 38°16′34″N 112°38′17″W
- Area: less than one acre
- Built: 1887
- MPS: Beaver MRA
- NRHP reference No.: 83004397
- Added to NRHP: April 15, 1983

The James Fennemore House, at 195 N. 2nd East in Beaver, Utah, was built in 1887. It was listed on the National Register of Historic Places in 1983.

It is a one-and-a-half-story house with a mansard roof, which somewhat gives it a Second Empire appearance.

== See also ==
- Dr. George Fennemore House
