= Dr. George Fennemore House =

- U.S. National Register of Historic Places
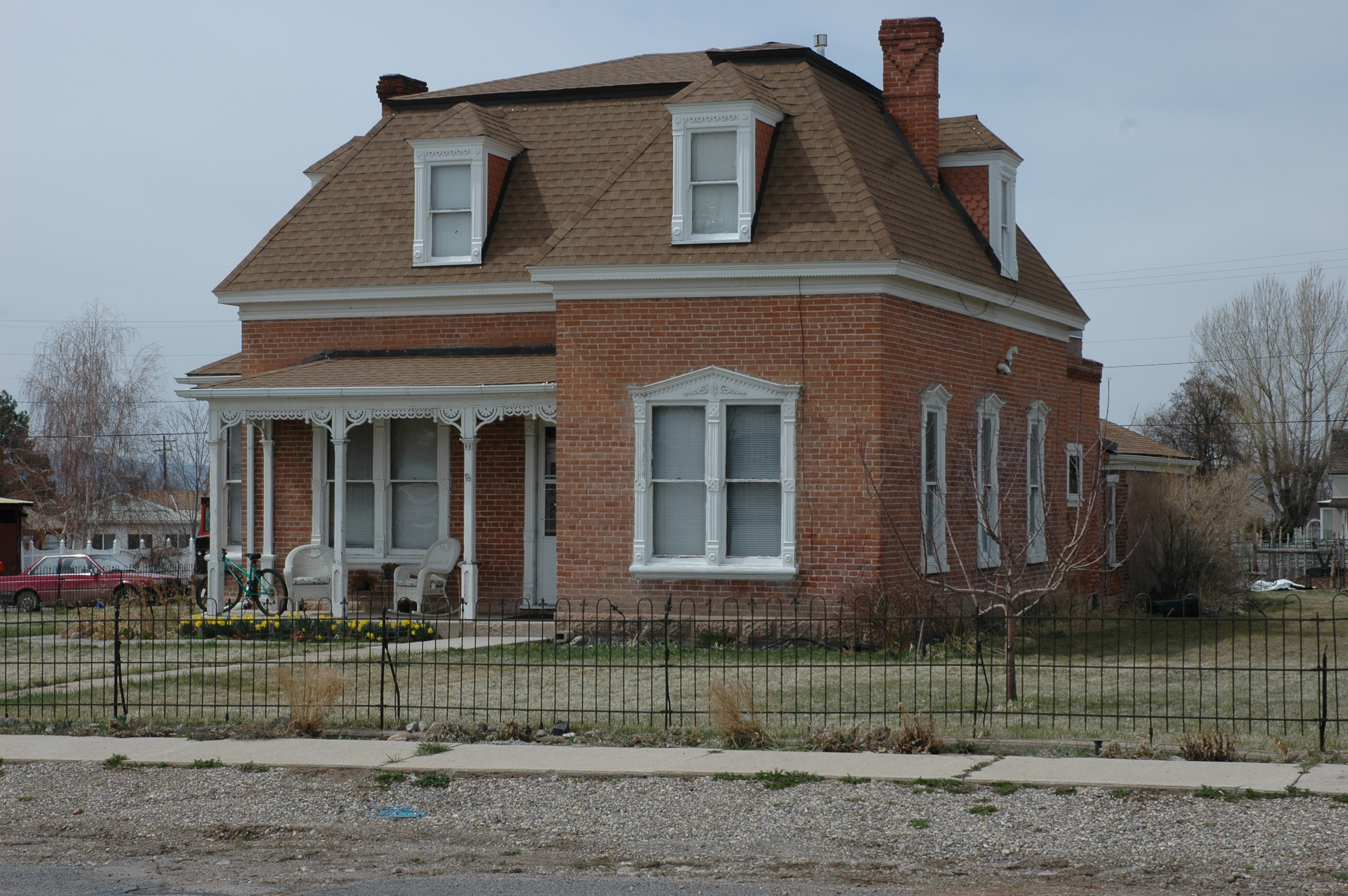

- Location within Utah Location within the United States
- Location: 90 S. 100 West, Beaver, Utah
- Coordinates: 38°16′23″N 112°38′35″W
- Area: less than one acre
- Built: 1898
- Architectural style: Second Empire, Vernacular
- NRHP reference No.: 80003885
- Added to NRHP: February 1, 1980

The Dr. George Fennemore House, at 90 S. 100 West in Beaver, Utah, was built in 1898. It was listed on the National Register of Historic Places in 1980.

It is vernacular in style, but it has a mansard roof, suggestive of Second Empire style.

== See also ==
- James Fennemore House
