= Edward Bird House =

- U.S. National Register of Historic Places
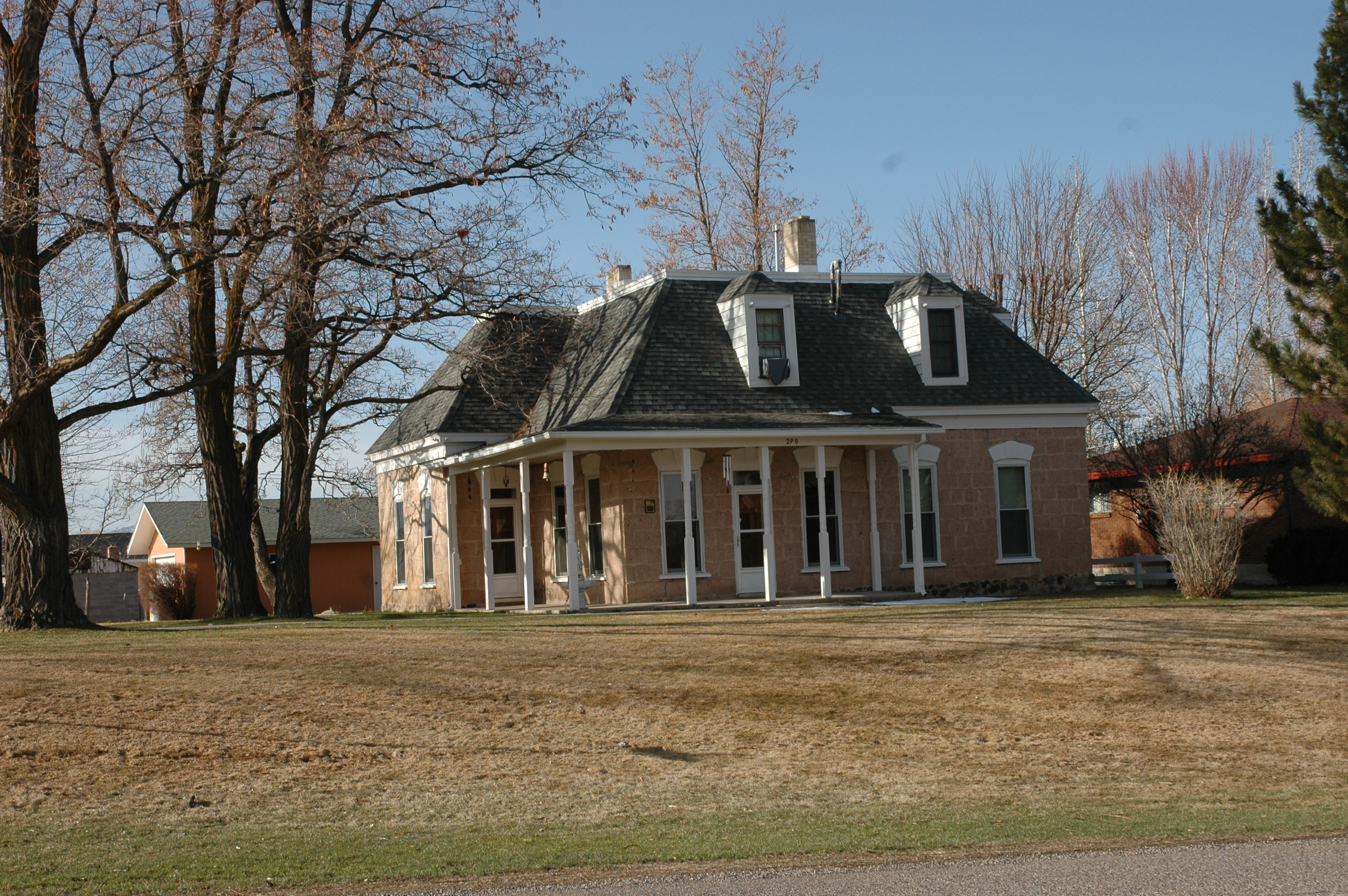

- Location within Utah Location within the United States
- Location: Center and 300 East, Beaver, Utah
- Coordinates: 38.273942°N 112.636432°W
- Area: less than one acre
- Built: 1893
- MPS: Beaver MRA
- NRHP reference No.: 83004392
- Added to NRHP: April 15, 1983

The Edward Bird House, at 290 E. Center St. in Beaver, Utah, was listed on the National Register of Historic Places in 1983.

Built of pink stone in 1893, it was deemed “an excellent example” of how Second Empire architecture was adapted in Beaver.

It is at the corner of Center St. and S. 300 East.

== See also ==
- Ellen Smith House, also Second Empire in Beaver
