= Ellen Smith House =

- U.S. National Register of Historic Places
- Location within Utah Location within the United States
- Location: 395 N. 300 West, Beaver, Utah
- Coordinates: 38°16′43″N 112°38′49″W
- Area: less than one acre
- Built: 1894
- Architectural style: Second Empire
- MPS: Beaver MRA
- NRHP reference No.: 83003896
- Added to NRHP: November 29, 1983

The Ellen Smith House, at 395 N. 300 West in Beaver, Utah, was built in 1894. It was listed on the National Register of Historic Places in 1983.

It is a one-and-a-half-story house with mansard roof and perhaps some other styling "inspired" by the Second Empire style.

== See also ==
- Compare Edward Bird House, also Second Empire, in Beaver
