= List of corporate titles =

Corporate titles or business titles are given to company and organization officials to show what job function, and seniority, a person has within an organisation. The most senior roles, marked by signing authority, are often referred to as "C-level", "C-suite" or "CxO" positions because many of them start with the word "chief". Many positions at this level report to a president or chief executive officer, or to a company's board of directors. People in senior executive positions of publicly traded companies are often offered stock options so it is in their interest that the price value of the company's shares increases over time, in parallel with being accountable to investors.

== List of corporate titles ==
- Chief administrative officer (CAO) - A top-tier executive who supervises the daily operations of a business and is ultimately responsible for its performance
- Chief analytics officer (CAO) - The senior manager responsible for the analysis of data within an organization
- Chief brand officer (CBO) - Officer responsible for a brand's image, experience, and promise
- Chief business development officer (CBDO) - Identifies new opportunities for the corporation and develops strategies to pursue those opportunities
- Chief business officer (CBO) - A position that allocates a company's resources to meet strategic and financial goals.
- Chief collection officer (CCO) - Officer responsible for outstanding debts owed to a company.
- Chief commercial officer (CCO) - Officer responsible for the commercial strategy and the development of an organization
- Chief communications officer (CCO) - The head of communications, public relations, and public affairs in an organization
- Chief compliance officer (CCO) - Person primarily responsible for overseeing and managing regulatory compliance issues within an organization
- Chief content officer (CCO) - Responsible for the digital media creation and multi-channel publication of the organization's content (text, video, audio, animation, etc.)
- Chief creative officer (CCO) - Officer who directs a company's creative output, developing the artistic design strategy that defines the company's brand
- Chief customer officer (CCO) - Responsible in customer-centric companies for the total relationship with an organization's customers
- Chief data officer (CDO) - Responsible for enterprise-wide governance and utilization of information as an asset, via data processing, analysis, data mining, information trading and other means
- Chief design officer (CDO) - Typically responsible for overseeing all design and innovation aspects of a company's products and services, including product design, graphic design, user experience design, industrial design, and package design
- Chief digital officer (CDO) - An individual who helps an organization drive growth by converting "analog" businesses to digital ones using the potential of modern online technologies and data (i.e., digital transformation), and at times oversees operations in digital sectors like mobile applications, social media and related applications, virtual goods, as well as web-based information management and marketing
- Chief diversity officer (CDO) - An organization's executive-level diversity and inclusion strategist
- Chief executive officer (CEO) - The most senior corporate, executive, or administrative officer in charge of managing an organization
- Chief experience officer (CXO) - Executive responsible for the overall experience of an organization's products and services
- Chief financial officer (CFO) - Primarily responsible for managing the company's finances, including financial planning, management of financial risks, record-keeping, and financial reporting
- Chief gaming officer (CGO) - Executive in charge of heading both the game development and the online and offline publishing functions of a company
- Chief genealogical officer (CGO) - Maintains the genealogical integrity of an organization
- Chief growth officer (CGO) - Identifies areas where the company can grow, maintain a sustained grow, measured in revenue, or user/subscriber base or equivalent
- Chief human resources officer (CHRO) - A corporate officer who oversees all aspects of human resource management and industrial relations policies, practices, and operations for an organization
- Chief information officer (CIO) - Alongside the CTO, often the most senior executive in an enterprise who works with information technology and computer systems, in order to support enterprise goals. Generally they focus on the internal technology requirements, leaving strategy, product and customer-facing issues with the CTO.
- Chief information officer (higher education) (CIO) - The senior executive who is responsible for information and communications technology in the university, college or other higher education institution
- Chief information security officer (CISO) - The senior-level executive within an organization responsible for establishing and maintaining the enterprise vision, strategy, and program to ensure information assets and technologies are adequately protected
- Chief innovation officer (CINO) - A person in a company who is primarily responsible for managing the process of innovation and change management in an organization, as well as being in some cases the person who "originates new ideas but also recognizes innovative ideas generated by other people"
- Chief quality officer (CQO) - A person in charge to oversee and manage all aspects of quality within the organization to ensure that products, services, and processes meet or exceed established quality standards and customer expectations. This person plays a critical role in fostering a culture of quality and ensuring that the organization delivers products and services that meet high standards of excellence.
- Chief investment officer (CIO) - The one whose purpose is to understand, manage, and monitor their organization's portfolio of assets, devise strategies for growth, act as the liaison with investors, and recognize and avoid serious risks, including those never before encountered
- Chief knowledge officer (CKO) - Officer responsible for managing intellectual capital and the custodian of knowledge management practices in an organization
- Chief learning officer (CLO) - The person in charge of learning management, be it corporate or personal training
- Chief legal officer (CLO) - The officer in charge of all an organization's legal affairs
- Chief marketing officer (CMO) - Corporate executive responsible for marketing activities in an organization
- Chief operating officer (COO) - The COO is responsible for the daily operation of a company
- Chief people officer (CPO) - Person in charge of every aspect of the employee life cycle in an organization
- Chief privacy officer (CPO) - Officer responsible for managing risks related to information privacy laws and regulations
- Chief process officer (CPO) - An executive responsible for business process management at the highest level of an organization
- Chief product officer (CPO) - An executive responsible for various product-related activities in an organization
- Chief reputation officer (CRO) - A CRO is responsible for reputation, brand, public relations and public affairs
- Chief research officer (CRO) - Officer responsible for research that supports enterprise goals
- Chief restructuring officer (CRO) - A senior officer of a company given broad powers to renegotiate all aspects of a company's finances to deal with an impending bankruptcy or to restructure a company following a bankruptcy filing
- Chief revenue officer (CRO) - A corporate officer responsible for all revenue generation processes in an organization
- Chief risk officer (CRO) - The executive accountable for enabling the efficient and effective governance of significant risks, and related opportunities, to a business and its various segments. Risks are commonly categorized as strategic, reputational, operational, financial, or compliance-related.
- Chief scientific officer (CSO) - A position at the head of scientific research operations at an organizations or company performing significant scientific research projects
- Chief security officer (CSO) - Senior executive accountable for the development and oversight of compliance, operational, strategic, financial and reputation security risk policies and programs intended for the mitigation and reduction of strategies relating to the protection of people, intellectual assets and tangible property
- Chief services officer (CSO) - Responsible for developing processes and tools, both internally and externally, for producing maximum value to all stakeholders with intelligent and efficient use of potentially fluctuating human resources
- Chief solutions officer (CSO) - Executive responsible for the identification, development and delivery of business solutions and services
- Chief strategy officer (CSO) - Responsible for developing strategy, managing the strategic planning process, and optimizing the corporate portfolio through M&A and divestitures
- Chief supply chain officer (CSCO) - Involves the movement and storage of raw materials, of work–in–progress inventory, and of finished goods from point of origin to point of consumption
- Chief sustainability officer (CSO) - Corporate executive in charge of a corporation's "environmental" programmes
- Chief technical officer (CTO) - A variation of chief technology officer
- Chief technology officer (CTO) - CTOs make decisions for the overarching technology infrastructure that closely align with an organization's goals, and tend to be more focused on strategic and customer facing or product issues. While CIOs focus more on internal infrastructure of a company and work alongside an organization's IT staff members to perform everyday operations.
- Chief technology security officer (CTSO) - The senior-level executive within an organization responsible for establishing and maintaining the enterprise security technical vision, controls, and program to ensure information assets and technologies are adequately protected. Some organizations have both a CISO and a CTSO.
- Chief visibility officer (CVO) - An individual appointed to oversee all aspects of performance across retail stores, corporations or organizations
- Chief visionary officer (CVO) - Officer responsible of creating a forward vision for a company
- Chief web officer (CWO) - Person in charge of an organisation's Internet presence, including all Internet and intranet sites
- President (corporate title) - Person in charge of more larger and complex organisations; a second-in-command to the chief executive officer
