= Chief officer =

A chief officer can refer to any of various leaders:

== Military ==
- Chief petty officer
- Chief warrant officer

== Marine occupation ==
- Chief mate

== Corporate title ==
Collectively referred to as being part of the C-suite:

=== Business ===
- Chief executive officer
- Chief operating officer
- Chief information officer
- Chief technical officer
- Chief accounting officer
- Chief accessibility officer
- Chief administrative officer
- Chief analytics officer
- Chief compliance officer
- Chief communications officer
- Chief creative officer
- Chief content officer
- Chief customer officer
- Chief data officer
- Chief financial officer
- Chief governance officer
- Chief information security officer
- Chief knowledge officer
- Chief learning officer
- Chief legal officer
- Chief marketing officer
- Chief networking officer
- Chief process officer
- Chief procurement officer
- Chief risk officer
- Chief security officer
- Chief science officer
- Chief strategy officer
- Chief solutions officer
- Chief sustainability officer
- Chief technology officer
- Chief visionary officer

=== Education ===
- Chief academic officer
- Chief business officer

=== Government ===
- Chief Dental Officer (disambiguation)
- Chief District Officer
- Chief Electoral Officer (disambiguation)
- Chief fire officer
- Chief firearms officer
- Chief Medical Officer
- Chief police officer
- Chief Veterinary Officer
