= Corporate title =

Titles given in an organization to show what duties and responsibilities a person has

Corporate titles or business titles are given to corporate officers to show what duties and responsibilities they have in the organization. Such titles are used by publicly and privately held for-profit corporations, cooperatives, nonprofit organizations, educational institutions, partnerships, and sole proprietorships that also confer corporate titles.

== Variations ==
There are considerable variations in the composition and responsibilities of corporate titles.

Within the corporate office or corporate center of a corporation, some corporations have a chairman and chief executive officer (CEO) as the top-ranking executive, while the number two is the president and chief operating officer (COO); other corporations have a president and CEO but no official deputy. Typically, senior managers are "higher" than vice presidents, although many times a senior officer may also hold a vice president title, such as executive vice president and chief financial officer (CFO). The board of directors is technically not part of management itself, although its chairman may be considered part of the corporate office if he or she is an executive chairman.

A corporation often consists of different businesses, whose senior executives report directly to the CEO or COO, but that depends on the form of the business. If organized as a division then the top manager is often known as an executive vice president (EVP). If that business is a subsidiary which has considerably more independence, then the title might be chairman and CEO.

In many countries, particularly in Europe and Asia, there is a separate executive board for day-to-day business and supervisory board (elected by shareholders) for control purposes. In these countries, the CEO presides over the executive board and the chairman presides over the supervisory board, and these two roles will always be held by different people. This ensures a distinction between management by the executive board and governance by the supervisory board. This seemingly allows for clear lines of authority. There is a strong parallel here with the structure of government, which tends to separate the political cabinet from the management civil service.

In the United States and other countries that follow a single-board corporate structure, the board of directors (elected by the shareholders) is often equivalent to the European or Asian supervisory board, while the functions of the executive board may be vested either in the board of directors or in a separate committee, which may be called an operating committee (J.P. Morgan Chase), management committee (Goldman Sachs), executive committee (Lehman Brothers), executive council (Hewlett-Packard), or executive board (HeiG) composed of the division/subsidiary heads and senior officers that report directly to the CEO.

=== India ===
Section 149 of the Companies Act 2013 mandates a board of directors for each company regardless of its size. The same act mandates that the share certificates must be signed by two officers with titles specified by law (e.g. a two directors or a director and company secretary).

=== United States ===
State laws in the United States traditionally required certain positions to be created within every corporation, such as president, secretary and treasurer. Today, the approach under the Model Business Corporation Act, which is employed in many states, is to grant corporations discretion in determining which titles to have, with the only mandated organ being the board of directors.

Some states that do not employ the MBCA continue to require that certain offices be established. Under the law of Delaware, where most large US corporations are established, stock certificates must be signed by two officers with titles specified by law (e.g. a president and secretary or a president and treasurer). Every corporation incorporated in California must have a chairman of the board or a president (or both), as well as a secretary and a chief financial officer.

Limited liability company (LLC)-structured companies are generally run directly by their members, but the members can agree to appoint officers such as a CEO or to appoint "managers" to operate the company.

American companies are generally led by a CEO. In some companies, the CEO also has the title of "president". In other companies, a president is a different person, and the primary duties of the two positions are defined in the company's bylaws (or the laws of the governing legal jurisdiction). Many companies also have a CFO, a COO and other senior positions such as chief legal officer (CLO), chief strategy officer (CSO), chief marketing officer (CMO), etc. that report to the president and CEO. The next level, which are not executive positions, is middle management and may be called "vice presidents", "directors" or "managers", depending on the size and required managerial depth of the company.

=== United Kingdom ===
In British English, the title of managing director is broadly synonymous with that of chief executive officer. Managing directors do not have any particular authority under the Companies Act in the UK, but do have implied authority based on the general understanding of what their position entails, as well as any authority expressly delegated by the board of directors.

=== Japan and South Korea ===
In Japan, corporate titles are roughly standardized across companies and organizations; although there is variation from company to company, corporate titles within a company are always consistent, and the large companies in Japan generally follow the same outline. These titles are the formal titles that are used on business cards. Korean corporate titles are similar to those of Japan.

Legally, Japanese and Korean companies are only required to have a board of directors with at least one representative director. In Japanese, a company director is called a torishimariyaku (取締役) and a representative director is called a daihyō torishimariyaku (代表取締役). The equivalent Korean titles are isa (이사, 理事) and daepyo-isa (대표이사, 代表理事). These titles are often combined with lower titles, e.g. senmu torishimariyaku or jōmu torishimariyaku for Japanese executives who are also board members. Most Japanese companies also have statutory auditors, who operate alongside the board of directors in supervisory roles.

Under the commercial code in Japan, Jugyōin (従業員) meaning the "employee", is different from Kaishain (会社員), meaning the "stockholders".

The typical structure of executive titles in large companies includes the following:

English gloss	Kanji (hanja)	Japanese	Korean	Comments
Chairman	会長 (會長)	Kaichō	Hoejang (회장)	Often a semi-retired president or company founder. Denotes a position with considerable power within the company exercised through behind-the-scenes influence via the active president.
Vice chairman	副会長 (副會長)	Fuku-kaichō	Bu-hoejang (부회장)	At Korean family-owned chaebol companies such as Samsung, the vice-chairman commonly holds the CEO title (i.e., vice chairman and CEO)
President	社長	Shachō	Sajang (사장)	Often CEO of the corporation. Some companies do not have the "chairman" position, in which case the "president" is the top position that is equally respected and authoritative.
Deputy president or senior executive vice president	副社長	Fuku-shachō	Bu-sajang (부사장)	Reports to the president
Executive vice president	専務	Senmu	Jŏnmu (전무)	
Senior vice president	常務	Jōmu	Sangmu (상무)	
Vice president or general manager or department head	部長	Buchō	Bujang (부장)	Highest non-executive title; denotes a head of a division or department. There is significant variation in the official English translation used by different companies.
Deputy general manager	次長	Jichō	Chajang (차장)	Direct subordinate to buchō/bujang
Manager or section head	課長	Kachō	Gwajang (과장)	Denotes a head of a team or section underneath a larger division or department
Assistant manager or team leader	係長 (代理)	Kakarichō	Daeri' (대리)	
Staff	社員	Shain	Sawon (사원)	Staff without managerial titles are often referred to without using a title at all

Personnel
Classification		English gloss	Kanji	Japanese
管理監督者 商人 使用者	Administrator or merchant	Chairman	会長	Kaichō
管理監督者 商人 使用者	Administrator or merchant	Vice chairman	副会長	Fuku-kaichō
管理監督者 商人 使用者	Administrator or merchant	President	会社長	Kaishachō
管理監督者 商人 使用者	Administrator or merchant	Vice president	副社長	Fuku-shachō
管理監督者 商人 使用者	Administrator or merchant	Senior director and managing director (precedence depends on company and their roles)	専務	Senmu
管理監督者 商人 使用者	Administrator or merchant	Senior director and managing director (precedence depends on company and their roles)	常務	Jōmu
管理職 商業使用人 使用者	Manager or mercantile servant	General manager	本部長	Hon-buchō
管理職 商業使用人 使用者	Manager or mercantile servant	Department manager	部長	Buchō
管理職 商業使用人 使用者	Manager or mercantile servant	Deputy department manager	次長	Jichō
管理職 商業使用人 使用者	Manager or mercantile servant	Section manager	課長	Kachō
管理職 商業使用人 使用者	Manager or mercantile servant	Assistant section manager	課長補佐	Kachō-hosa
管理職 商業使用人 使用者	Manager or mercantile servant	Team leader or team manager	係長	Kakarichō
従業員 労働者 被用者 被雇用者	Senior staff or chief (staff)		主任	Shunin
従業員 労働者 被用者 被雇用者	Staff			

Executives
Classification		English gloss	Kanji	Japanese
役員	Executive	Director	取締役	Torishimariyaku
役員	Executive	Statutory auditor	監査役	Kansayaku
役員	Executive	Accounting advisor	会計参与	Kaikei-Sanyo
役員等	Executives and etcetera	Executive director	執行役	Shikkōyaku
役員等	Executives and etcetera	Accounting auditor	会計監査人	Kaikei-kansanin

The top management group, comprising jomu/sangmu and above, is often referred to collectively as "cadre" or "senior management" (幹部 or 重役; kambu or juyaku in Japanese; ganbu or jungyŏk in Korean).

Some Japanese and Korean companies have also adopted American-style titles, but these are not yet widespread and their usage varies. For example, although there is a Korean translation for "chief operating officer" (최고운영책임자, choego unyŏng chaegimja), not companies have yet adopted it with the exception of a few multi-nationals such as Samsung and CJ (a spin-off from Samsung), while the CFO title is often used alongside other titles such as bu-sajang (SEVP) or Jŏnmu (EVP).

Since the late 1990s, many Japanese companies have introduced the title of shikkō yakuin (執行役員) or 'officer', seeking to emulate the separation of directors and officers found in American companies. In 2002, the statutory title of shikkō yaku (執行役) was introduced for use in companies that introduced a three-committee structure in their board of directors. The titles are frequently given to buchō and higher-level personnel. Although the two titles are very similar in intent and usage, there are several legal distinctions: shikkō yaku make their own decisions in the course of performing work delegated to them by the board of directors, and are considered managers of the company rather than employees, with a legal status similar to that of directors. Shikkō yakuin are considered employees of the company that follow the decisions of the board of directors, although in some cases directors may have the shikkō yakuin title as well.

== Senior management ==
The highest-level executives in senior management usually have titles beginning with "chief" and ending with "officer", forming what is often called the "C-suite", or "CxO", where "x" is a variable that could be any functional area (not to be confused with CXO). The traditional three such officers are CEO, COO, and CFO. Depending on the management structure, titles may exist instead of, or be blended/overlapped with, other traditional executive titles, such as president, various designations of vice presidents (e.g. VP of marketing), and general managers or directors of various divisions (such as director of marketing); the latter may or may not imply membership of the board of directors.

Certain other prominent positions have emerged, some of which are sector-specific. For example, chief audit executive (CAE), chief procurement officer (CPO) and chief risk officer (CRO) positions are often found in many types of financial services companies. Technology companies of all sorts now tend to have a chief technology officer (CTO) to manage technology development. A chief information officer (CIO) oversees information technology (IT) matters, either in companies that specialize in IT or in any kind of company that relies on it for supporting infrastructure.

Many companies now also have a chief marketing officer (CMO), particularly mature companies in competitive sectors, where brand management is a high priority. A chief value officer (CVO) is introduced in companies where business processes and organizational entities are focused on the creation and maximization of value. Approximately 50% of the S&P 500 companies have created a chief strategy officer (CSO) in their top management team to lead strategic planning and manage inorganic growth, which provides a long range perspective versus the tactical view of the COO or CFO. This function often replaces a COO on the C-Suite team, in cases where the company wants to focus on growth rather than efficiency and cost containment. A chief administrative officer (CAO) may be found in many large complex organizations that have various departments or divisions. Additionally, many companies now call their top diversity leadership position the chief diversity officer (CDO). However, this and many other nontraditional and lower-ranking titles are not universally recognized as corporate officers, and they tend to be specific to particular organizational cultures or the preferences of employees.

=== Specific corporate officer positions ===
Chairman of the board – presiding officer of the corporate board of directors. The chairman influences the board of directors, which in turn elects and removes the officers of a corporation and oversees the human, financial, environmental and technical operations of a corporation.

- The CEO may also hold the title of "chairman", resulting in an executive chairman. In this case, the board frequently names an independent member of the board as a lead director. The C-suite is normally led by the CEO.
- Executive chairman – the chairman's post may also exist as an office separate from that of CEO, and it is considered an executive chairman if that titleholder wields influence over company operations, such as Vince McMahon of WWE, Steve Case of AOL Time Warner, and Douglas Flint of HSBC. In particular, the group chairmanship of HSBC is considered the top position of that institution, outranking the chief executive, and is responsible for leading the board and representing the company in meetings with government figures. Prior to the creation of the group management board in 2006, HSBC's chairman essentially held the duties of a chief executive at an equivalent institution, while HSBC's chief executive served as the deputy. After the 2006 reorganization, the management cadre ran the business, while the chairman oversaw the controls of the business through compliance and audit and the direction of the business.
- Non-executive chairman – also a separate post from the CEO, unlike an executive chairman, a non-executive chairman does not interfere in day-to-day company matters. Across the world, many companies have separated the roles of chairman and CEO, often resulting in a non-executive chairman, saying that this move improves corporate governance.
- Chief business officer is a corporate senior executive who assumes full management responsibility for the company's deal making, provides leadership and executes a deal strategy that will allow the company to fulfill its scientific/technology mission and build shareholder value, provides managerial guidance to the company's product development staff as needed.
- Chief of staff is a corporate director level manager who has overall responsibility for the staff activity within the company who often would have responsibility of hiring and firing of the highest level managers and sometimes directors. They can work with and report directly to managing directors and the chief executive officer.
- Commissioner
- Financial control officer, FCO or FC, also comptroller or controller – supervises accounting and financial reporting within an organization
- Director or member of a board of directors – high-level official with a fiduciary responsibility of overseeing the operation of a corporation and elects or removes officers of a corporation; nominally, directors, other than the chairman are usually not considered to be employees of the company per se, although they may receive compensation, often including benefits; in publicly held companies. A board of directors is normally made up of members (directors) who are a mixture of corporate officials who are also management employees of the company (inside directors) and persons who are not employed by the company in any capacity (outside directors or non-executive directors). In privately held companies, the board of directors often only consists of the statutory corporate officials, and in sole proprietorship and partnerships, the board is entirely optional, and if it does exist, only operates in an advisory capacity to the owner or partners. Non-profit corporations' governing board members may be called directors like most for-profit corporations, or an alternative like trustees, governors, etc.
- Director – a manager of managers within an organization who is often responsible for a major business function and who sometimes reports to a vice president (in some financial services companies the title vice president has a different meaning). Often used with name of a functional area; finance director, director of finance, marketing director, and so on. Not to be confused with a member of the board of directors, who is also referred to as a director. This is a middle management and not an executive level position, unless it is in the banking industry. Alternatively, a manager of managers is often referred to as a "senior manager' or as an "associate vice president", depending upon levels of management, and industry type.
- President – legally recognized highest "titled" corporate officer, and usually a member of the board of directors. There is much variation; often the CEO also holds the title of president, while in other organizations if there is a separate CEO, the president is then second highest-ranking position. In such a case the president is often the COO and is considered to be more focused upon daily operations compared to the CEO, who is supposed to be the visionary. If the corporate president is not the COO (such as Richard Parsons of Time Warner from 1995 to 2001), then many division heads report directly to the CEO themselves, with the president taking on special assignments from the CEO.
- Secretary or company secretary – legally recognized "titled" corporate officer who reports to the board of directors and is responsible for keeping the records of the board and the company. This title is often concurrently held by the treasurer in a dual position called secretary-treasurer; both positions may be concurrently held by the CFO. Note, however, that the secretary has a reporting line to the board of directors, regardless of any other reporting lines conferred by concurrent titles.
- Treasurer – legally recognized corporate officer entrusted with the fiduciary responsibility of caring for company funds. Often this title is held concurrently with that of secretary in a dual role called secretary-treasurer. It can also be held concurrently with the title of CFO or fall under the jurisdiction of one, though the CFO tends to oversee the finance department instead, which deals with accounting and audits, while the treasurer deals directly with company funds. Note, however, that the treasurer has a reporting line to the board of directors, regardless of any other reporting lines conferred by concurrent titles.
- Superintendent
- Owner (sometimes proprietor or sole proprietor, for sole proprietorships)
- Partner – Used in many different ways. This may indicate a co-owner as in a legal partnership or may be used in a general way to refer to a broad class of employees or temporary/contract workers who are often assigned field or customer service work. Associate is often used in a similar way.
- Vice chair or vice chairman – officer of the board of directors who may stand in for the chairman in his or her absence. However, this type of vice chairman title on its own usually has only an advisory role and not an operational one (such as Ted Turner at Time Warner). An unrelated definition of vice chair describes an executive who is higher ranking or has more seniority than executive vice president. Sometimes, EVPs report to the vice chair, who in turn reports directly to the CEO (so vice chairs in effect constitute an additional layer of management), other vice chairs have more responsibilities but are otherwise on an equal tier with EVPs. Executive vice chairman are usually not on the board of directors. Royal Bank of Canada previously used vice chairs in their inner management circle until 2004 but have since renamed them as group heads.

== List of chief officer (CO) titles ==
Title	Abbreviation	Explanation
Chief academic officer	CAO	Responsible for academic administration at universities and other higher education institutions
Chief accessibility officer	CAO	Responsible for overseeing accessibility and inclusion for people with disabilities and seniors
Chief accounting officer	CAO	Responsible for overseeing all accounting and bookkeeping functions, ensuring that ledger accounts, financial statements, and cost control systems are operating effectively
Chief administrative officer	CAO	Responsible for business administration, including daily operations and overall performance
Chief analytics officer	CAO	Responsible for data analysis and interpretation
Chief architect	CA	Responsible for designing systems for high availability and scalability, specifically in technology companies. Often called enterprise architects (EA).
Chief audit executive	CAE	Responsible for the internal audit
Chief brand officer	CBO	Responsible for a brand's image, experience, and promise, and propagating it throughout all aspects of the company, overseeing marketing, advertising, design, public relations and customer service departments
Chief business officer	CBO	Responsible for the company's deal making, provides leadership and execute a deal strategy that will allow the company to fulfill its scientific/technology mission and build shareholder value, provides managerial guidance to the company's product development staff as needed.
Chief business development officer	CBDO	Responsible for business development plans, design and implementation of processes to support business growth
Chief commercial officer	CCO	Responsible for commercial strategy and development
Chief communications officer	CCO	Responsible for communications to employees, shareholders, media, bloggers, influencers, the press, the community, and the public. Practical application of communication studies
Chief compliance officer	CCO	Responsible for overseeing and managing regulatory compliance.
Chief content officer	CCO	Responsible for developing and commissioning content for broadcasting channels and multimedia exploitation
Chief creative officer	CCO	In one sense of the term, responsible for the overall look and feel of marketing, media, and branding. In another sense, similar to chief design officer.
Chief customer officer	CCO	Responsible for customer relationship management
Chief data officer	CDO	Responsible for enterprise-wide governance and utilization of information and data as assets, via data processing, data analysis, data mining, information trading, and other means
Chief delivery officer	CDO	Responsible for leading the project management office for project coordination, and facilitating product deliveries among clients worldwide
Chief design officer	CDO	Responsible for overseeing all design aspects of a company's products and services, including product design, graphic design, user experience design, industrial design, and package design, and possibly aspects of advertising, marketing, and engineering
Chief development officer	CDO	Responsible for activities developing the business, usually through added products, added clients, markets or segments
Chief digital officer	CDO	Responsible for adoption of digital technologies, digital consumer experiences, the process of digital transformation, and devising and executing social strategies
Chief diversity officer	CDO	Responsible for diversity and inclusion, including diversity training and equal employment opportunity
Chief engineering officer	CEngO	Similar to the more common chief technology officer (CTO); responsible for technology/product R & D and manufacturing issues in a technology company, oversees the development of technology being commercialized
Chief executive officer	CEO	Responsible for the overall vision and direction of an organization, making the final decisions over all of the corporation's operations. The highest-ranking management officer; often also the chairman of the board. Usually called CEO in the United States, chief executive or managing director in the United Kingdom, Commonwealth of Nations, and some other countries.
Chief experience officer	CXO	Responsible for user experience, overseeing user experience design and user interface design. CXO is not to be confused with CxO, a term commonly used when referring to any one of various chief officers.
Chief financial officer	CFO	Responsible for all aspects of finances
Chief gaming officer	CGO	Responsible for both the game development and the online and offline publishing functions of a company that makes video games
Chief government relations officer	CGRO	Responsible for all aspects of government relations and lobbying
Chief human resources officer	CHRO	Responsible for all aspects of human resource management and industrial relations
Chief idea officer	CIdO	Responsible for idea management and front end innovation
Chief information officer	CIO	Responsible for IT, particularly in IT companies or companies that rely heavily on an IT infrastructure
Chief information security officer	CISO	Responsible for information security
Chief information technology officer	CITO	Responsible for information technology. Often equivalent to chief information officer (CIO) and, in a company that sells IT, chief technology officer (CTO).
Chief innovation officer	CINO	Responsible for innovation
Chief investment officer	CIO	Responsible for investment and for the asset liability management (ALM) of typical large financial institutions such as insurers, banks and/or pension funds
Chief knowledge officer	CKO	Responsible for managing intellectual capital and knowledge management
Chief learning officer	CLO	Responsible for learning and training
Chief legal officer	CLO	Responsible for overseeing and identifying legal issues in all departments and their interrelation, as well as corporate governance and business policy. Often called general counsel (GC) or chief counsel.
Chief marketing officer	CMO	Responsible for marketing; job may include sales management, product development, distribution channel management, marketing communications (including advertising and promotions), pricing, market research, and customer service.
Chief medical informatics officer	CMIO	Responsible for the effective use of health information technology and clinical information systems to support patient care, clinical workflows, data analysis, and medical decision-making. Typically serves as a liaison between clinical staff and information technology teams.
Chief medical officer	CMO	Responsible for scientific and medical excellence, especially in pharmaceutical companies, health systems, hospitals, and integrated provider networks. The title is used in many countries for the senior government official who advises on matters of public health importance. In the latter sense compare also chief dental officer.
Chief networking officer	CNO	Responsible for social capital within the company and between the company and its partners
Chief nursing officer	CNO	Responsible for nursing
Chief operating officer	COO	Responsible for supervising office administration and maintenance, business operations, including operations management, operations research, and (when applicable) manufacturing operations; role is highly contingent and situational, changing from company to company and even from a CEO to their successor within the same company. Often called "director of operations" in the nonprofit sector.
Chief privacy officer	CPO	Responsible for all the privacy of the data in an organization, including privacy policy enforcement
Chief process officer	CPO	Responsible for business processes and applied process theory, defining rules, policies, and guidelines to ensure that the main objectives follow the company strategy as well as establishing control mechanisms
Chief procurement officer	CPO	Responsible for procurement, sourcing goods and services and negotiating prices and contracts
Chief product officer	CPO	Responsible for all product-related matters. The CPO is to the business's product what the CTO is to technology. The responsibilities of the CPO are inclusive of product vision, product strategy, user experience, product design, product development, and product marketing.
Chief quality officer	CQO	Responsible for quality and quality assurance, setting up quality goals and ensuring that those goals continue to be met over time
Chief research officer	CRO	Responsible for research
Chief research and development officer	CRDO	Responsible for research and development
Chief revenue officer	CRO	Responsible for measuring and maximizing revenue
Chief risk officer	CRO	Responsible for risk management, ensuring that risk is avoided, controlled, accepted, or transferred and that opportunities are not missed. Sometimes called chief risk management officer (CRMO).
Chief sales officer	CSO	Responsible for sales
Chief science officer	CSO	Responsible for science, usually applied science, including research and development and new technologies. Sometimes called chief scientist.
Chief security officer	CSO	Responsible for security, including physical security and network security
Chief software officer	CSO	Responsible for the overall software strategy, roadmap, engineering, and user experience
Chief solutions officer	CSO	Responsible for the development and delivery of reliable and innovative business and technology solutions
Chief strategy officer	CSO	Responsible for all aspects of strategy and strategic planning, including enterprise portfolio management, corporate development, and market intelligence
Chief sustainability officer	CSO	Responsible for environmental/sustainability programs
Chief system engineer	CSE	Responsible for the whole system specification, validation, and verification in development processes. Usually using as the manager of other sub-system engineers.
Chief technology officer (or "Chief technical officer")	CTO	Responsible for technology and research and development, overseeing the development of technology to be commercialized. For an information technology company, the subject matter would be similar to the CIO's; however, the CTO's focus is technology for the firm to sell versus technology used for facilitating the firm's own operations. This position is sometimes called "Chief technical officer", and often has the responsibility of managing the "technical issues" related to products or services in organizations that are not necessarily focused on technology. This is relatively common in NGOs and the development aid sector when the CEO or Project Director is not a person with a strong technical background related to the aid program focus such as economic development, renewable energy, human rights, agriculture, WASH, emergency responses, etc. The CTO provides guidance and advice to the program implementation team related to technical things. In some development aid programs, this position is similar to the technical director.
Chief value officer	CVO	Ensure that all programs, actions, new products, services and investments create and capture customer value.
Chief visionary officer	CVO	Responsible for defining corporate vision, business strategy, and working plans
Chief web officer	CWO	Responsible for the web presence of the company and usually for the entire online presence, including intranet and Internet (web, mobile apps, other)

== Middle management ==
- Supervisor
- Foreman
- General manager or GM
- Manager
- Of counsel – A lawyer working on a part-time or temporary basis for a company or law firm.
- Vice president – Middle or upper manager in a corporation. They often appear in various hierarchical layers such as executive vice president, senior vice president, associate vice president, or assistant vice president, with EVP usually considered the highest and usually reporting to the CEO or president. Many times, corporate officers such as the CFO, COO, CSO, CIO, CTO, secretary, or treasurer will concurrently hold vice president titles, commonly EVP or SVP. Vice presidents in small companies are also referred to as chiefs of a certain division, such as vice president for finance, or vice president for administration. In some financial contexts, the title of vice president is actually subordinate to a director.

== See also ==
- Corporate liability
- Identification with corporation
- International Executive Resources Group
- List of corporate titles
- Outline of management
