= Title =

Prefix or suffix added to someone's name

A title is one or more words used before or after a person's name, in certain contexts. It may signify their generation, official position, military rank, professional or academic qualification, or nobility. In some languages, titles may be inserted between the first and last name (for example, Graf in German or clerical titles such as Cardinal in Catholic usage – Richard Cardinal Cushing). Some titles are hereditary.

== Types ==
Titles include:

- Honorific titles or styles of address, a phrase used to convey respect to the recipient of a communication, or to recognize an attribute such as:
  - Imperial, royal and noble rank
  - Academic degree
  - Social title, prevalent among certain sections of society due to historic or other reasons.
  - Other accomplishment, as with a title of honor
- Title of authority, an identifier that specifies the office or position held by an official

== Titles in English-speaking areas ==
=== Common titles ===
- Mr. – All males
- Ms. – Adult women
- Mrs. – Married women (includes widows and divorcées)
- Miss – Unmarried women and girls (form of address)
- Madam (also Madame and Ma'am) – Formal form of address for an adult woman. Also used with an official position, similar to "Mister" for men, e.g. "Madam/Mister Ambassador"

==== Controversy around usage of common titles ====
Some people object to the usage of titles to denote marital status, age or gender. In 2018, a campaign named GoTitleFree was launched to encourage businesses to stop requesting, storing and using marital status titles in their registration forms, and when speaking with customers, launched on the grounds that titles often lead to assumptions about a woman's age or availability for marriage, and exclude non-binary people (though various titles, such as Mx., are increasingly used in some countries). This is in line with established practice advocated by the World Wide Web Consortium and the Government Digital Service, which sets the standard for UK government online services. This in turn means that titles are optional on UK passports and driving licences.

==== Familial ====
Family titles in English-speaking countries include:

- Uncle – one's parent's brother (may also include great uncles)
- Cousin – son or daughter of either parent's brother or sister
- Aunt or Aunty – one's parent's sister (may also include great aunts)
- Granny, Gran, Grandma or Nana – one's grandmother (may also include great-grandmothers)
- Pop, Grandpa, Gramps or Grandad – one's grandfather (may also include great-grandfathers)

=== Legislative and executive titles ===
- Hon. (Honourable), for younger sons and daughters of barons, and Rt. Hon. (Right Honourable), for Privy Councillors, used in the United Kingdom

Some job titles of members of the legislature and executive are used as titles.

- MP, for members of the Parliament (usually the lower house)
- MYP, for members of the UK Youth Parliament
- MSYP, for members of the Scottish Youth Parliament
- Representative
- Senator, for members of the American or Australian upper house
- Speaker, for speaker of Parliament
- President (from which comes such titles as Deputy President, Executive Vice President, Lord President of the Council, and Vice President)
- Councillor, for member of a council
- Youth Councillor (YC)
- Alderman/Selectman
- Delegate
- Mayor and related terms such as Lady Mayoress and Lord Mayor
- Governor and Lieutenant Governor
- Prefect
- Prelate
- Premier
- Burgess
- Ambassador
- Envoy
- Secretary, Cardinal Secretary of State, Foreign Secretary, General Secretary, Secretary of State, and other titles in the form "Secretary of..." in which Secretary means the same thing as Minister
- Attaché
- Chargé d'affaires
- Provost
- Minister (from which comes such titles as Prime Minister and Health Minister)

=== Aristocratic titles ===
- Prince/Princess – From the Latin princeps, meaning 'first person' or 'first citizen'. The title was originally used by Augustus at the establishment of the Roman Empire to avoid the political risk of assuming the title Rex ('King') in what was technically still a republic. In modern times, the title is often given to the sons and daughters of ruling monarchs. Also a title of certain ruling monarchs under the Holy Roman Empire and its subsidiary territories until 1918 which is still used in Liechtenstein (Monaco still uses the title Prince to this day, even though it was not a part of the Holy Roman Empire), and in Imperial Russia before 1917. The German title is Fürst ('first'), a translation of the Latin term; (Note: From the Old High German furisto, 'the first', a translation of the Latin princeps) the equivalent Russian term is князь (knyaz).
- Archduke/Archduchess – A title derived from the Greek Archon ('ruler; higher') and the Latin Dux ('leader'). It was used most notably by the Habsburg Dynasty, who ruled Austria and Hungary until 1918.
- Grand Duke/Grand Duchess – 'Big; large' + Latin Dux ('leader'). A variant of Archduke, used particularly in English translations Romanov Dynasty Russian titles. Also used in various Germanic territories until World War I. Still survives in Luxembourg.
- Duke/Duchess – From the Latin Dux, a military title used in the Roman Empire, especially in its early Byzantine period when it designated the military commander for a specific zone.
- Marquis, Marquess/Marquise, or Marchioness – From the French marchis, literally 'ruler of a border area' (from the Old French marche meaning 'border'; exact English translation is 'March Lord', or 'Lord of the March'.
- Count/Countess - From the Latin comes meaning 'companion'. The word was used by the Roman Empire in its Byzantine period as an honorific with a meaning roughly equivalent to modern English peer. It became the title of those who commanded field armies in the Empire, as opposed to Dux, which commanded locally based forces.
- Earl (used in the United Kingdom instead of Count, but the feminine equivalent is Countess) – From the Germanic jarl, meaning 'chieftain', the title was brought to the British Isles by the Anglo-Saxons and survives in use only there, having been superseded in Scandinavia and on the European continent.
- Viscount/Viscountess - From the Latin vicarius ('Deputy; substitute'. Hence vicar and prefix vice-) appended to Latin comes. Literally translates as 'Deputy Count'.
- Baron/Baroness - From the Late Latin Baro, meaning 'man, servant, soldier'. The title originally designated the chief feudal tenant of a place, who was in vassalage to a greater lord.

In the United Kingdom, Lord and Lady are used as titles for members of the nobility. Unlike titles such as Mr and Mrs, they are not used before first names except in certain circumstances, for example as courtesy titles for younger sons, etc., of peers. In Scotland, Lord of Parliament and Lady of Parliament are the equivalents of Baron and Baroness in England.

- Lord – From the Old English hlāford, hlāfweard, meaning, literally, 'bread-keeper', from hlāf ('bread') + weard ('guardian, keeper') and by extension 'husband, father, or chief'. (From which comes modified titles such as First Sea Lord and Lord of the manor.) The feminine equivalent is Lady from the related Old English hlǣfdīġe meaning, literally, "bread-kneader", from hlāf ("bread") + dīġe ("maid"), and by extension wife, daughter, or mistress of the house. (From which comes First Lady, the Second Lady, etc.)
- Emperor/Empress – From the Latin Imperator, meaning 'he/she who holds the authority to command (imperium)'.
- King/Queen – Derived from Old Norse/Germanic words. The original meaning of the root of king apparently meant 'leader of the family' or 'descendant of the leader of the family', and the original meaning of queen meant 'wife'. By the time the words came into English they already meant 'ruler'.
- Tsar/Tsarina (Tsaritsa) – Slavonic loan-word from Latin.
- Caesar – The name of Julius Caesar taken by his heir Augustus and thereafter by Augustus' successors as Roman Emperor through the fall of Constantinople in 1453. Loaned into German as Kaiser.
- Leader – From Old English lædan, meaning "to guide". The head of state of North Korea is titled Great Leader. The de facto head of state of Iran is titled Supreme Leader.
- Chief – A variation of the English "Prince", used as the short form of the word "Chieftain" (except for in Scotland, where "Chieftain" is a title held by a titleholder subordinate to a chief). Generally used to refer to a recognised leader within a chieftaincy system. From this come the variations paramount chief, clan chief and village chief. The feminine equivalent is Chieftess.

Male version	Female version	Realm	Adjective	Latin	Examples
Pope	n/a (Note: Popess, the title of a character found in Tarot cards, is based upon the Pope of the Roman Catholic Church. As the Bishop of Rome is an office always forbidden to women, there is no formal feminine of Pope, which comes from the Latin word papa (an affectionate form of the Latin for "father"). The legendary female Pope Joan is also referred to as Popess. Nonetheless, some European languages, along with English, have formed a feminine form of the word pope, such as the Italian papessa, French papesse, Portuguese papisa, and German Päpstin.)	Papacy	Papal	Papa	Monarch of the Papal States and later Sovereign of the State of Vatican City
Emperor	Empress	Empire	Imperial; Imperial and Royal (Austria)	Imperator (Imperatrix)	Roman Empire, Byzantine Empire, Ottoman Empire, Holy Roman Empire, Russia, First and Second French Empire, Austria, Mexican Empire, Empire of Brazil, German Empire (none left in Europe after 1918), Empress of India (ceased to be used after 1947 when India was granted independence from the British Empire), Japan (the only remaining enthroned emperor in the world).
King	Queen	Kingdom	Royal	Rex (Regina)	Common in larger sovereign states
Viceroy	Vicereine	Viceroyalty	Viceroyal, Viceregal	Proconsul	Historical: Spanish Empire (Peru, New Spain, Rio de la Plata, New Granada), Portuguese Empire (India, Brazil), British Empire
Grand Duke	Grand Duchess	Grand duchy	Grand Ducal	Magnus Dux	Today: Luxembourg; historical: Lithuania, Baden, Finland, Tuscany et al.
Archduke	Archduchess	Archduchy	Archducal	Arci Dux	Historical: Unique only in Austria, Archduchy of Austria; title used for member of the Habsburg dynasty
Prince	Princess	Principality, Princely state	Princely	Princeps	Today: Monaco, Liechtenstein, Asturies, Wales; (Note: Prince of Wales is a title granted, following an investiture, to the eldest son of the Sovereign of the United Kingdom – he is not a monarch in his own right.) Andorra (Co-Princes). Historical: Albania, Serbia
Duke	Duchess	Duchy	Ducal	Dux	Duke of Buccleuch, Duke of York, Duke of Devonshire et al.
Count	Countess	County	Comital	Comes	Most common in the Holy Roman Empire, translated in German as Graf; historical: Portugal, Barcelona, Brandenburg, Baden, numerous others
Baron	Baroness	Barony	Baronial	Baro	There are normal baronies and sovereign baronies, a sovereign barony being comparable to a principality; however, this is an historical exception: sovereign barons no longer have a sovereign barony, but only the title and style
Chief	Chieftainess	Chiefdom, Chieftaincy	Chiefly	Capitaneus	The clan chiefs of Scotland, the grand chiefs in the Papua New Guinean honours system, the chief of the Cherokee nation, the chiefs of the Nigerian chieftaincy system, numerous others

=== Titles used by knights, dames, baronets and baronetesses ===
- Sir – Used by knights and baronets
- Dame – Used by dames and baronetesses

Both the titles "Sir" and "Dame" differ from titles such as "Mr" and "Mrs" in that they can only be used before a person's first name, and not immediately before their surname. Neither "Sir" or "Dame" confer nobility upon the titleholder.

- Chevalier (French)
- Cavaliere (Italian)

=== Judicial titles ===
- Advocate
- Advocate General (AG)
- Attorney
- Bailiff
- Barrister
- Chancellor (C) (of the High Court)
- Judge and Admiralty Judge
- Justice (J)
  - Chief Justice or Lord Chief Justice (CJ) (of the judiciary)
  - Lord Justice Clerk
  - Lord Justice of Appeal (LJ) (of the Court of Appeal)
  - Justice of the Peace
- Magistrate and Promagistrate
- Master of the Rolls (MR) (of the Court of Appeal)
- Member and Chairman, for members of quasi-judicial boards
- Mufti and Grand Mufti
- Notary
- President (P) (of the Queen's/King's Bench Division) or President (P) (of the Family Division)
  - Lord President of the Court of Session
- Privy Counsellor (or Privy Councillor) (PC) (of Her Majesty's Most Honourable Privy Council)
- Queen's Counsel (QC) (King's Counsel (KC) when monarch is male)
- Solicitor

==== Historical ====
- Lictor
- Reeve
- Seneschal
- Tribune

=== Ecclesiastical titles (Christian) ===
Titles are used to show somebody's ordination as a priest or their membership in a religious order. Use of titles differs between denominations.

==== Religious ====
- Abbess
- Abbot
- Brother – also for monks
- Friar
- Mother, Mother Superior, and Reverend Mother
- Reverend
- Sister – for religious sisters and nuns

==== Priests ====
Christian priests often have their names prefixed with a title similar to The Reverend.

- Bishop (from which come Archbishop, Boy Bishop, Lord Archbishop, Metropolitan Bishop, and Prince Bishop)
- Presbyter
- Priest (from which comes High Priest. The feminine equivalent is Priestess.)
- Father (Fr.)
- Patriarch
- Pope
- Catholicos
- Vicar
- Chaplain
- Canon
- Pastor
- Prelate
- Primate
- Dom – from Latin: Dominus, 'Lord'. Used for Benedictine monks in solemn religious vows, but reserved for abbots among the Trappists. In Brazil, it is used for bishops.
- Cardinal
- Ter (title) – Used by Armenian priests.

==== Used for deceased persons only ====
- Servant of God
- Venerable
- Blessed
- Saint (abbreviated S. or St.)

==== Other ====
- Christ – Greek translation of the Hebrew מָשִׁיחַ (or 'Messiah'), commonly used to refer to Jesus of Nazareth
- Deacon and Archdeacon
- Acolyte
- Dean
- Elder
- Minister
- Monsignor
- President (in the Church of Jesus Christ of Latter-day Saints)
- Reader
- Almoner and Lord High Almoner (Christian)
- Apostle
- Prophet
- Teacher
- Seventy
- Evangelist
- High Priest

=== Academic titles ===
- Dr. – Short for doctor, a title used by those with doctoral degrees, such as PhD, DPhil, MD, DO, DDS, EdD, DCN, DBA, DNP, PharmD, DVM, and LLD. Those with JD degrees, although technically allowed, do not use this as a title by convention.
- Prof. – Professor
- Doc. – Docent
- EUR ING – Short for European Engineer, an international professional qualification and title for highly qualified engineers used in over 32 European countries.

=== Military titles ===
Military ranks are used before names.

- Admiral (from which come Grand Admiral, Fleet Admiral, Lord High Admiral, Rear Admiral, and Vice Admiral)
- Brigadier
- Captain (from which comes Group Captain)
- Colonel (from which comes Lieutenant Colonel)
- Commander (from which come Commander-in-Chief, Lieutenant Commander, and Wing Commander)
- Commodore (from which comes Air Commodore)
- Corporal (from which come Lance Corporal and Staff Corporal)
- General is usually used as a sort of shorthand for "general military commander". The term's far-reaching connotation has provoked its use in a very broad range of titles, including Adjutant General, Attorney General, Captain General, Colonel General, Director General, Generalissimo, General of the Army, Governor General, Lieutenant General, Lord Justice General, Major General, Resident General, Secretary General, Solicitor General, Surgeon General and Vicar General
- Lieutenant (from which come First Lieutenant, Flight Lieutenant and Lord Lieutenant)
- Major
- Marshal (from which comes Air Chief Marshal, Air Marshal, Air Vice Marshal and Field Marshal)
- Mate, more often titled as Chief Mate or First Mate
- Officer, a generic sort of title whose use has spread in recent years into a wide array of mostly corporate and military titles. These include Air Officer, Chief Academic Officer, Chief analytics officer, Chief Business Development Officer, Chief Credit Officer, Chief Executive Officer, Chief Financial Officer, Chief Information Officer, Chief Information Security Officer, chief knowledge officer, Chief Marketing Officer, Chief Operating Officer, Chief Petty Officer, Chief Risk Officer, Chief Security Officer, Chief Strategy Officer, Chief Technical Officer, Chief Warrant Officer, Corporate officer, Customs officer, Field officer, First Officer, Flag Officer, Flying Officer, General Officer, Intelligence Officer, Junior Warrant Officer, Master Chief Petty Officer, Master Warrant Officer, Officer of State, Petty Officer, Pilot Officer, Police Officer, Political Officer, Revenue Officer, Senior Officer, Ship's Officer, Staff Officer, and Warrant Officer.
- Private, and many equivalent ranks depending on regiment.
- Sergeant (from which come Sergeant at Mace and Sergeant at Arms).

=== Maritime titles ===
The names of shipboard officers, certain shipping line employees and Maritime Academy faculty/staff are preceded by their title when acting in performance of their duties.

- Captain – a ship's highest responsible officer acting on behalf of the ship's owner (Master) or a person who is responsible for the maintenance of the vessels of a shipping line, for their docking, the handling of cargo and for the hiring of personnel for deck departments (Port Captain).
- Chief – a licensed mariner in charge of the engineering (Chief Engineer) or deck (Chief Mate or Officer) department
- Mate – licensed member of the deck department of a merchant ship (see Second Mate & Third Mate)
- Cadet – unlicensed trainee mate/officer or engineer under training

=== Law enforcement ===
The names of police officers may be preceded by a title such as "Officer" or by their rank.

- Constable (from which come Lord High Constable and Senior Constable)
- Agent
- Sergeant
- Officer
- Chief

=== Protected professional titles ===
In several jurisdictions, the use of some professional titles is restricted to people holding a valid and recognised license to practice. Unqualified individuals who use these reserved titles may be fined or jailed. Protected titles may be limited to those professions that require a bachelor's degree or higher and a state, provincial, or national license.

Usage varies between countries. For example, in the United Kingdom nutritionist and psychologist, titles protected in many countries, are not protected, and anybody can so describe themselves, while dietitian and clinical psychologist (and many specialist professional psychologists) are protected. An international survey on the different protection of terms for psychologists found wide differences in regulations across different jurisdictions.

- Professional Engineer, Registered Engineer, Engineer (in Quebec)
- Professional Nurse, Registered Nurse, Nurse

=== Other organizations ===
Some titles are used to show a person's role or position in a society or organization.

- Principal
- Nanny
- Coach
- Wizard, such as the Grand Wizard and Imperial Wizard of the Ku Klux Klan
- Brother or Sister, often used, in particular, to signify membership of some religious orders
- Father, often used to identify a priest
- Chief Scout (The Scout Association) – the head of The Scout Association
- King's Scout – title conferred upon a scout upon achieving highest attainable award achievable in the Scouting movement
- Queen's Guide – title conferred upon a guide upon highest attainable award for members of the Girl Guiding movement
- Scout, Eagle Scout
- Grandmaster
- Doctor is often used to identify a person as a physician, but is also an honorific for anyone holding a doctorate in any field.

Some titles are used in English to refer to the position of people in foreign political systems

- Citizen, First Citizen
- Comrade

== Non-English speaking areas ==
=== Default titles in other languages ===
	French	German	Dutch	Spanish	Italian	Swedish	Portuguese	Greek	Hindi
Male	Monsieur	Herr	Meneer	Señor	Signor	Herr	Senhor	Κύριος-ε (Kyrios)	Śrīmān/Śrī
Female	Madame	Frau	Mevrouw	Señora	Signora	Fru	Senhora	Κυρία	Śrīmatī
Unmarried female	Mademoiselle	Fräulein	Juffrouw/Mejuffrouw	Señorita	Signorina	Fröken	Senhorita	Δεσποινίς	Suśrī

In many of those languages the title for unmarried female is considered to be antiquated and may be considered as legally improper.

=== Martial arts ===
- Sensei - used for martial arts instructors
- Senpai - used for junior karate instructors and karate instructors in training
- Karate-ka - used for karate students
- Judge - used for the judges and referees at martial arts tournaments
- Master - used for kung-fu instructors or people who have studied the art their entire life

=== Academic ===
- Docent
- Doctorandus, abbreviated as drs.

=== Religious ===
- Ayatollah
- Seghatoleslam
- Bodhisattva
- Bhagat
- Druid and Archdruid
- Granthi
- Guru
- Hakham
- Buddha
- Hajji
- Imam
- Jathedar
- Jathedarni
- Kohen
- Lama and the related Dalai Lama and Panchen Lama
- Mahatma
- Mahdi
- Mullah
- Mawlana
- Mawlawi
- Nath
- Pastor
- Pujari
- Rabbi
- Rebbe
- Reverend
- Rosh HaYeshiva
- Rishi
- Saoshyant
- Sadhu
- Sadhvi
- Sardar
- Sardarni
- Tirthankar
- Vardapet
- Yogi
- Yogini

=== Honorary titles ===
- Mahatma
- Oknha
- Pandit
- Sant
- Sheikh
- Swami
- Ustad

=== Rulers ===
- Chancellor (from which come Lord Chancellor and Vice-Chancellor)
- "Dear Leader" and "Supreme Leader" referred to Kim Jong-il as chief of North Korea. The title now refers to his son and successor Kim Jong-un. (친애하는 지도자, ch'inaehanŭn jidoja)
- Elder
- Emir/Emira – Arabic Prince/Princess
- Eze
- Maharajah
- Rajah
- Rai
- Babu
- Dato
- Mwami
- Nizam
- Oba
- Obi
- Sultan/Sultana (title) – Arabic for 'powerful ruler'
- Chief – origin of Chief of Staff, Chieftain, Clan Chief, Hereditary Chief, and War Chief. The present head of Samoa is titled a Paramount Chief
- Vizier and Grand Vizier
- Stadtholder

==== Historical titles for heads of state ====
The following are no longer officially in use, though some may be claimed by former regnal dynasties.

===== Appointed =====
- Caesar (an honorific family name passed through Roman emperors by adoption)
- Legate
- Satrap
- Tetrarch

===== Elected or popularly declared =====
- Archon
- Augustus (title)
- Caudillo
- Consul
- Decemvir
- Doge
- Duce
- Führer
- Imperator
- Lord Protector
- Roman dictator
- Triumvir

===== Hereditary =====
- Basileus
- Caliph
- Khagan
- Khan
- King-Emperor (the feminine equivalent is Queen-Empress)
- Malik
- Maharajah
- Rajah
- Rai
- Mikado
- Mirza
- Nawab
- Negus
- Patil
- Pharaoh
- Regina (the masculine form is Rex)
- Saopha
- Sapa Inca
- Shah
- Tsar

When a difference exists below, male titles are placed to the left and female titles are placed to the right of the slash.

- Africa
  - Almamy – Fulani people of west Africa
  - Asantehene – Ashanti, title of the King of the Ashanti People in Ghana
  - Eze – Igbo people of Nigeria
  - Kabaka – Baganda people of Buganda in Uganda
  - Mwami – Kings of Rwanda and Burundi
  - Negus – Ethiopia
  - Oba – Yoruba people of Nigeria
  - Omukama – Bunyoro, title of some Emperors/kings in Uganda
  - Pharaoh – ancient Egypt
- Asia
  - Arasan/Arasi – Tamil Nadu (India), Sri Lanka
  - Arqa/Thagavor – King of Armenia
  - Bayin – The title given to the king of pre colonial Burma
  - Maharajah/ Rajah/ Rai/ Chakarwarti Raja – India Sri Lanka
  - Chogyal – 'Divine Ruler – ruled Sikkim until 1975
  - Datu – pre-colonial Philippines
  - Druk Gyalpo – hereditary title given to the king of Bhutan
  - Engku or Ungku – Malaysia, to denote particular family lineage akin to royalty
    - Hari – Filipino title for king
  - Huángdì – Imperial China (Emperor)
    - Hwangje – Self-styled Korean "emperor"; states that unified Korea
    - Hoang De – Self-styled Vietnamese "emperor"; unified Vietnam
  - Maha raja/feminine form is Maharani – Emperor, Empress India, Sri Lanka
  - Meurah – Aceh before Islam
  - Mirza, Persian/Iranian, Indian and Afghanistan and Tajikistan King
    - Beg (Begzada or Begzadi, son-daughter of Beg), Baig or Bey in Under Mirza and using King or Military title.
  - Patil – meaning 'head' or 'chief'; an Indian title. The Patil is in effect the ruler of this territory as he was entitled to the revenues collected therefrom.
  - Phrabat Somdej Phrachaoyuhua – King of Thailand (Siam), the title literally means 'the feet of the Greatest Lord who is on the heads (of his subjects)'. This royal title does not refer directly to the king himself but to his feet, according to traditions.
    - Racha – Thailand, same meaning as Raja
    - Raja – pre-colonial Philippines
    - Raja – Malaysia, Raja denotes royalty in Perak and certain Selangor royal family lineages, is roughly equivalent to Prince or Princess
    - Raja/Rani – Nepal King
    - Rani – Nepali Queen
  - Patabenda – Sub-king of Sri Lanka
  - Preah Karuna Preah Bat Sâmdech Preah Bâromneath – King of Cambodia Khmer, the title literally means 'The feet of the Greatest Lord who is on the heads (of his subjects)' (referring not directly to the king himself but to his feet, according to tradition)
  - Qaghan – Central Asian Tribes
  - Saopha – Shan, king of Shan, today as a part of Myanmar
  - Shahinshah or Padshah or Badshah- Persian/Iranian, 'King of Kings' or Persian rulers in Hindustan(India)
    - Shah – Persian/Iranian and Afghanistan and Tajikistan King
  - Sheikh – Arabic traditional regional leader, principalities of (Bahrain, Kuwait, Qatar, UAE)
  - Sultan/Sultana – Arabic King (present Oman and former Ottoman Empire)
    - Aceh, Brunei, Java, Oman, Malaysia, Sultan is the title of seven (Johor, Kedah, Kelantan, Pahang, Perak, Selangor, and Terengganu) of the nine rulers of the Malay states.
  - Susuhanan – the Indonesian princely state of Surakarta until its abolition
  - Seyed – Islamic World, descendants of the Islamic prophet Muhammad
  - Tennō or Mikado – Japan
    - Shōgun – Japanese military dictator
    - Sumeramikoto, Okimi – Japan, king
  - Tengku – Malaysia, Indonesia, Tengku (also spelled Tunku in Johor), Negeri Sembilan, Kedah and Deli Sultanate of Indonesia is roughly equivalent to Prince or Princess
  - Veyndhan, ko/Arasi – Tamil Nadu(India)
  - Wang (King) – pre-Imperial China. In China, 'king' is the usual translation for the term wang, 王.
    - Wang – States of Korea that did not have control over the entire peninsula.
    - Vuong – States in Vietnam that did not control the entire realm.
  - Yang di-Pertuan Agong – Monarch of Malaysia, elected each five years among the reigning Sultan of each Malaysian state
- Europe
  - Autocrator – Greek term for the Byzantine Emperor
  - Basileus – Greek ruler
  - Despot, a Byzantine court title, also granted in the states under Byzantine influence, such as the Latin Empire, Bulgaria, Serbia, and the Empire of Trebizond.
  - Domn (in Romanian)/Gospodar (in Old Slavonian) – Medieval Romania (Moldova, Wallachia)
  - Fejedelem – Ancient/Medieval Hungarian
  - Germanic king
  - Großbürger/Großbürgerin (English: Grand Burgher) – historical German title acquired or inherited by persons and family descendants of the ruling class in autonomous German-speaking cities and towns of Central Europe, origin under the Holy Roman Empire, ceased after 1919 along with all titles of German nobility.
  - Kaiser/Kaiserin – Imperial rulers of Germany and of Austria-Hungary
  - Kniaz'/Knyaginya/Knez/Knjeginja (generally translated as 'prince') – Kievan Rus'/Serbia
  - Kunigaikshtis (Kunigaikštis) – Lithuanian, duke as in Grand Duchy of Lithuania.
  - Rí, Rí túaithe, Ruiri, Rí ruireach, and Ard Rí – King, local king, regional overking, (provincial) king of overkings, and High King in Gaelic Ireland, also Scotland
  - Tsar/Tsarina – the ruler of Imperial Russia
  - Tsar/Tsaritsa – Bulgaria, pre-imperial Russia, Serbia
  - Vezér – Ancient Hungarian
  - Vojvoda (Serbian)/Vajda (Hungarian) – Serbian/Hungarian/Romany title
  - Župan, sometimes Veliki Župan (Grand Župan) – Serbia, Croatia
- Oceania
  - Chieftain – Leader of a tribe or clan.
  - houʻeiki, matai, aliʻi, tūlafale, tavana, ariki – usually translated as 'chief' in various Polynesian countries.
  - Mo'i – normally translated as King, used by Hawaiian monarchs since unification in 1810. The last person to hold the title was Queen Lili'uokalani.
  - Tuʻi or tui – there were/are also kings in Oceania (i.e. Samoa, Tonga, Wallis and Futuna, Nauru)

=== Aristocratic ===
==== Historical ====
- Russian:
  - Boyarin
  - Dyak
  - Knyaz (and Veliky Knyaz)
  - Namestnik
  - Okolnichy
  - Posadnik
  - Voyevoda
- German:
  - Burggraf
  - Graf
  - Freigraf
  - Landgraf
  - Markgraf
  - Pfalzgraf
  - Reichsgraf
- Spanish:
  - Don
  - Hidalgo
- Others:
  - Augusta (feminine equivalent of Augustus)
  - Bitwoded (translates as 'beloved')
  - Comes
  - Concubine (the Chinese imperial system, for instance, had a vastly complex hierarchy of titled concubines and wives to the emperor)
  - Dejazmach (translates as 'Commander of the Gate')
  - Fitawrari (translates as 'Leader of the Vanguard')
  - Gentleman (used as a title in such forms as Gentleman at Arms, Gentleman of the Bedchamber, and Gentleman Usher. The feminine equivalent is Gentlewoman, or, in some circumstances, Lady.)
  - Gerazmach (translates as 'Commander of the Left')
  - Kenyazmach (translates as 'Commander of the Right')
  - Ras (translates as 'Head')
  - Sahib

== Other ==
- Commissioner (from which come First Church Estates Commissioner and High Commissioner)
- Comptroller (from which Comptroller General and Comptroller of the Household)
- Courtier
- Curator
- Doyen
- Edohen
- Ekegbian
- Elerunwon
- Forester or Master Forester
- Headman
- Intendant (and the related Superintendent)
- Lamido
- Marcher or Lady Marcher
- Matriarch or Patriarch
- Prior, Lord Prior
- Pursuivant
- Rangatira
- Ranger
- Registrar (in a variant spelling in the title Lord Clerk Register)
- Seigneur (from which come Monsignor and the French common polite term Monsieur, equivalent to Mister)
- Sharif
- Shehu
- Sheikh
- Sheriff (from which comes High Sheriff)
- Subaltern
- Subedar
- Sysselmann
- Timi
- Treasurer, Master Treasurer and Secretary Treasurer
- Verderer
- Warden, Hereditary Warden, Lord Warden
- Woodman
- Bearer, such as Hereditary Banner Bearer, Standard Bearer, or Swordbearer
- Sayyid
- Apprentice
- Journeyman
- Adept
- Akhoond
- Arhat
- Bwana
- Goodman and Goodwife
- Grand Bard
- Mullah
- Sri
- Baba
- Effendi
- Giani or Gyani
- Guru
- Siddha
- Pir, Murshid

=== Historical ===
- Abuna
- Aedile
- Ali'i
- Aqabe sa'at (translates as Guardian of the Church Hours)
- Balambaras (translates as Fortress Commander)
- Bán
- Baig
- Bey
- Boyar
- Castellan
- Cellarer
- Censor
- Centurion
- Circuitor
- Commissar, often as People's Commissar
- Conquistador
- Daimyō
- Dey
- Dux
- Elector
- Gauleiter
- Guardian
- Ichege
- Infirmerer
- Inquisitor and Grand Inquisitor
- Jemadar
- Kitchener
- Mage
- Magister Militum
- Majordomo
- Maid – archaic title denoting an unmarried woman, such as the character Maid Marian. Should not be confused with the general term for a young domestic worker/housemaid.
- Margrave
- Naib
- Officium
- Pasha
- Palatine (Ancient Rome, the Roman Catholic Church, Hungary (nádor), etc.)
- Pontiff and Pontifex Maximus
- Praetor
- Prebendary
- Quaestor
- Sacrist
- Samurai
- Shōgun
- Stadtholder
- Steward
- Thakore
- Voivode
- Viceroy (the feminine equivalent is Vicereine)

== Post-nominal letters ==
Members of legislatures often have post-nominal letters expressing their membership.

- Member of Congress: MC
- Member of Parliament: MP
- Member of the European Parliament: MEP
- Member of the Scottish Parliament: MSP
- Member of the Scottish Youth Parliament: MSYP
- Member of the Youth Parliament: MYP
- Member of Provincial Parliament: MPP
- Member of the National Assembly: MNA
- Member of the House of Keys: MHK
  - Speaker of the House of Keys: SHK
- Member of the Legislative Council: MLC
- Member of the Legislative Assembly: MLA
- Member of the House of Representatives: Rep.
- Member of the House of Assembly: MHA

=== University degrees ===
- Associate
  - AA – Associate of Arts
  - AAS – Associate of Applied Science
  - AS – Associate of Science
- Bachelor
  - BA – Bachelor of Arts
  - BArch – Bachelor of Architecture
  - BBA – Bachelor of Business Administration
  - BSBA – Bachelor of Science of Business Administration
  - BBiotech – Bachelor of Biotechnology
  - BDS / BChD – Bachelor of Dental Surgery
  - BDentTech – Bachelor of Dental Technology
  - BDes – Bachelor of Design
  - BD / BDiv – Bachelor of Divinity
  - BEd – Bachelor of Education
  - BEng – Bachelor of Engineering
  - BEnvd – Bachelor of Environmental Design
  - BFA – Bachelor of Fine Arts
  - LLB – Bachelor of Laws
  - BMath – Bachelor of Mathematics
  - MB, ChB / MB, BS / BM, BCh / MB, BChir – Bachelor of Medicine, Bachelor of Surgery
  - BMus – Bachelor of Music
  - BN – Bachelor of Nursing
  - BPhil – Bachelor of Philosophy
  - STB – Bachelor of Sacred Theology
  - BSc – Bachelor of Science
  - BSN – Bachelor of Science in Nursing
  - BSW – Bachelor of Social Work
  - BTh / ThB – Bachelor of Theology
  - BVSc – Bachelor of Veterinary Science
- Designer [Dz]
- Doctor
  - DA – Doctor of Arts
  - DBA – Doctor of Business Administration
  - D.D. – Doctor of Divinity
  - Ed.D. – Doctor of Education
  - EngD or DEng – Doctor of Engineering
  - DFA – Doctor of Fine Arts
  - DMA – Doctor of Musical Arts
  - D.Min. – Doctor of Ministry
  - D.Mus. – Doctor of Music
  - D.Prof – Doctor of Professional Studies
  - DPA – Doctor of Public Administration
  - D.Sc. – Doctor of Science
  - JD – Doctor of Jurisprudence
  - LL.D. – Doctor of Laws
  - MD – Doctor of Medicine
  - DO – Doctor of Osteopathic Medicine
  - Pharm.D. – Doctor of Pharmacy
  - Ph.D. / D.Phil. – Doctor of Philosophy
  - PsyD – Doctor of Psychology
  - SJD – Doctor of Juridical Science
  - Th.D. – Doctor of Theology
  - Doctorates within the field of medicine:
    - DC
    - DDS – Doctor of Dental Surgery
    - DMD – Doctor of Dental Medicine
    - O.D.
    - DPT
    - DPM
    - DVM
- Master
  - MArch – Master of Architecture
  - MA – Master of Arts
  - MAL – Master of Liberal Arts
  - MBA – Master of Business Administration
  - MPA – Master of Public Administration
  - MPS – Master of Public Service
  - MPl – Master of Planning
  - MChem – Master in Chemistry
  - MC – Master of Counselling
  - M. Des – Master of Design
  - M.Div. – Master of Divinity
  - MDrama – Master of Drama
  - MDS – Master of Dental Surgery
  - MEd – Master of Education
  - MET – Master of Educational Technology
  - MEng – Master of Engineering
  - MFA – Master of Fine Arts
  - MHA – Master of Healthcare Administration
  - MHist – Master of History
  - MLitt - Master of Letters
  - LL.M. – Master of Law
  - MLA – Master of Landscape Architecture
  - MMath – Master of Mathematics
  - MPhil – Master of Philosophy
  - MRes – Master of Research
  - MSc – Master of Science
  - MScBMC – Master of Biomedical Communications
  - MPhys – Master of Physics
  - MPharm – Master of Pharmacy
  - MPH – Master of Public Health
  - MSBA - Master of Science in Business Analytics
  - MSE – Master of Science in Engineering
  - MSRE – Master of Science in Real Estate
  - MSN – Master of Science in Nursing
  - MSW – Master of Social Work
  - Magister – Magister
  - S.T.M. – Master of Sacred Theology
  - MTh/Th.M. – Master of Theology
  - MURP – Master of Urban and Regional Planning

== See also ==
- Byzantine aristocracy and bureaucracy
- Corporate title
- Ethiopian aristocratic and religious titles
- False titles of nobility
- Hereditary title
- Honorific
- Index of religious honorifics and titles
- List of titles
- Military rank
- Nobility
- Peerage
- Political institutions of Rome
- Post-nominal letters
- Pre-nominal letters
- Royal and noble ranks
- Royal and noble styles
- Suffix (name)
- Style (manner of address)
- Title of honor

== Bibliography ==
- African Kings by Daniel Lainé
- Keepers of the Kingdom by Alastair Bruce, Julian Calder, and Mark Cator
- Master and Commander, film directed by Peter Weir
