= CDO =

CDO or cdo may refer to:

== Job titles ==
- Chief data officer
- Chief Dental Officer (disambiguation)
- Chief design officer
- Chief digital officer
- Chief diversity officer
- Command duty officer, on a naval ship

== Places ==
- Cagayan de Oro, a city in Mindanao, Philippines
- Canyon del Oro High School, in Arizona, US
- Cardonald railway station, Glasgow, Scotland, station code CDO

== Science and technology ==
=== Biology and chemistry ===
- Cadmium oxide (CdO)
- Cysteine dioxygenase (CDO), an enzyme

=== Computing ===
- Climate Data Operators, command line computer software suite for climate data
- Collaboration Data Objects, a Microsoft API for data access
- Connected Data Objects, in the Eclipse Modeling Framework

=== Meteorology ===
- Central dense overcast, feature seen in tropical cyclones

== Other uses ==
- CDO Foodsphere, a Philippine meat processing company
- Collateralized debt obligation, a structured finance product
- Community dial office, a small telephone exchange in a rural area
- Conservative Democratic Organisation, a grouping in the British Conservative Party
- Continuous duty overnight, an airline crew scheduling term
- Eastern Min language, ISO 639-3 language code cdo
