= MSBA =

MSBA is a four-letter initialism standing for:

- Maryland State Bar Association
- Master of Science in Business Analytics
- Master of Science in Business Administration is dual degree option which enables students to combine the MS program with the MBA program. See Master of Science or Master of Business Administration.
- Medway and Swale Boating Association, and association the exits to promote and protect boating on the tidal Medway and Swale
- Minnesota State Bar Association, the state bar in Minnesota
- Metropolitan Suburban Bus Authority, now known as Nassau Inter-County Express, a bus operator in Nassau County, New York
