= Business executive =

Person responsible for running a business, or an aspect of it

A business executive is a person responsible for running an organization, although the exact nature of the role varies depending on the organization.

Executives run companies or government agencies. They create plans to help their organizations grow. Becoming an executive usually takes years of promotions and hard work since the qualifications of this role needs hard working individuals with years of experience in multiple facets of the business.

== Occupations ==
The business executive occupation covers many jobs. These positions include chief executive officer, department store manager, and small business operator. Executives are in charge of their organization. They create and review goals for the company. They work closely with a team of upper-level staff or assistants. This team may make both long- and short-range plans to achieve these goals. Once the plans are set, executives make sure the company follows the changes. They do this by meeting with the managers of all the departments and getting progress reports. Executives are typically elected by the organization's owners, shareholders, and board of directors. The term usually refers to the person running the organization or someone involved in the upper-level management role of a corporation, company, as opposed to being the founder, owner, or majority shareholder of the organization.

== Duties ==
Executives' duties depend on how many people are on their staff. Some executives oversee general managers in different areas. In larger organizations, they may direct one area, such as marketing, finance, or legal services. For example, in the financial area, executives may direct the buying or selling of land or other investments. Other executives get more involved. They may hire and train new staff. They may direct staff on what tasks need to be done. They may choose computer systems to record data, such as budgets. When complaints arise, executives may direct investigations to resolve what occurred in the agency or between staff members.

A large part of an executive's job is developing relationships with people outside the organization. These people may be customers or contributors. One way executives create relationships is by giving speeches at conferences. Executives may also serve on the boards of community groups. These activities promote the company and its leader.

In addition, executives oversee budgets. They use budgets to analyze how well the organization is running. They make suggestions about where to cut expenses. Executives may also suggest where improvements could be made. Executives also negotiate contracts with outside agencies. They need good persuasion skills to keep costs down.

== Government executives ==
Government executives oversee agencies that develop laws and regulations. They meet regularly with their citizens. They learn how voters feel about the issues. Officials need to do these reality checks to see if they have the citizens' support. Executives also promote economic growth within their communities. They plan and organize different activities to help meet these goals. Government executives make connections between the United States and other countries. They help to promote international trade.

The government executive occupation also covers many jobs. They range from city council member, mayor, and governor, all the way up to President or head of state. Some of these positions are elected. Other officials are appointed to their jobs. In smaller communities, many of these jobs may be volunteer positions. Sometimes these jobs run through only part of the year.

== See also ==
- Chief executive officer (CEO)
- International Executive Resources Group
