= Chief digital information officer =

A chief digital information officer may refer to either:

- Chief digital officer
- Chief information officer
