= RootsTech =

Family history conference and trade show

- Status: Active
- Genre: Family history and technology, genealogy
- Venue: Salt Palace Convention Center
- Location: Salt Lake City, Utah
- Country: United States
- Inaugurated: 2011
- Attendance: 28,000 (2018)
- Organizer: FamilySearch International
- Website: www.rootstech.org

RootsTech is an annual genealogy and family history conference organized by FamilySearch and sponsored by The Church of Jesus Christ of Latter-day Saints. Since its start in 2011, it has grown into the world's largest family history technology event, highlighting the latest innovations in genealogy research. The event is held annually in Salt Lake City, Utah, and features keynote speakers, informational workshops, Q/A sessions, and an expo hall showcasing genealogical products and services from around the world.

== History ==
While some state that RootsTech is an outgrowth of three former conferences, the Conference on Computerized Family History and Genealogy, the Family History Technology Workshop and the FamilySearch Developers Conference, these three conferences were invited to participate in the original 2011 RootsTech, but some of them remain in existence today. The RootsTech conference was an entirely new and different event.

Rootstech began as a concept discussed by former CEO of FamilySearch, Jay Verkler and FamilySearch Chief Genealogical Officer David Rencher to help draw attention to the development problems faced in the world of genealogy. In July 2010, Anne Teerlink, AG©, CG® (formerly Anne Roach) was asked to design, roadmap, and develop the conference from scratch and have it ready by the beginning of February 2011. She was brought in to work on the conference because of her experience in both the fields of technology and genealogy. From the beginning of her work on the 2011 Conference, Teerlink stated she was designing it to operate without her and that she had no plans to continue as the conference chair in the future. She prepared the original budget plans, did user testing to come up with the name of the conference, selected the chairs for each element of the conference, met with and selected the venue designers and food vendors, designed and created the entire roadmap for RootsTech, and incorporated elements not currently present in any genealogy conference in the world.

According to Teerlink, she designed RootsTech after the JavaOne conference, including the elements of unconferencing, gaming and fun in the expo hall, competitions and prizes offered to developers for solving genealogy-related problems, and primarily unpaid presenters. In order to help meet the initial desired attendee numbers, Teerlink met with Brigham Young University's (BYU) manager of conferences and workshops and offered remuneration for the use of the mailing list for its genealogy conference attendees. In return, John Best who worked for BYU's conferences and workshops organized and printed the syllabus for RootsTech 2011 and Teerlink named Best as co-chair of RootsTech 2011.

Teerlink was already working closely with Gordon Clarke who held an annual FamilySearch Developer's Conference, a small-scale yet important event directed only at developers using the FamilySearch Platform. The FamilySearch Developer's Conference was incorporated into RootsTech since Clarke became a part of bringing in software developers who trusted him to participate in RootsTech. Clarke was at the inaugural RootsTech and developed the initial call-for-papers system for speakers.

Teerlink had previously worked with Christophe Giraud-Carrier, who chaired the annual Family History Technology Workshop. Teerlink invited the students and developers from that conference to present their new developments and receive awards at the inaugural RootsTech 2011. As of 2023, the Family History Technology Workshop continues to operate separate from RootsTech.

Teerlink built a business model for RootsTech that was not common in 2011, forever changing the face of genealogy conferences. She knew that the best way to boost the number of conference attendees was to provide a free sample of the sessions by broadcasting select sessions for free. "Sometimes the only way to sell a delicious peach pie is to give everyone a free sample so that they want to buy more," Teerlink said, using Chick-fil-A as a model. Teerlink worked with speaker coordinator and session chair, Devon Ashby, and monitored the enrollment of each course. She chose to stream those sessions with the highest enrollment in order to provide the best possible experience for skeptics of the new conference. The free live-streaming of sessions has continued to be a successful element of RootsTech.

Working with FamilySearch's strategic relations team, Teerlink helped define sponsor packages at Silver, Gold and Platinum packages. These included sponsors for prizes, speaker gifts, and special events that were not common to genealogy conferences. To the delight of conference attendees Novell donated hundreds of bags and allowed Teerlink to select remnants from its previous conferences. Novell also added the RootsTech logo to the bags. Microsoft set up a gaming station working with Expo Hall chair Carol Smith and offered free operating systems and prizes for drawings. iPads were hot items that were offered as prizes for conference attendees. A blogger's booth was established for the first time in genealogy history, using genealogy bloggers as a primary source of communicating the events surrounding RootsTech 2011.

Chris Van der Kuyl of BrightSolid sponsored an evening event at the Clark Planetarium. Matthew and Brian Monahan, owners of Inflection offered leather journals and pens as speaker gifts. Additional sponsors for luncheons and other items included Ancestry.com, Federation for Genealogical Societies, New England Historic Genealogical Society, SharingTime.com and BYU's computer science department. Cash prizes were also available for student computer science contests. Class tracks included Technology Users (TU) and Technology Creators (TC) although anyone was welcome to attend either track. Also, since technology submitted up to a year in advance can become outdated, the "unconferencing sessions" allowed anyone to sign up the morning of each conference day to present their newest cutting-edge technologies and methodologies presented in 15 minute speed sessions.

Meetingplaces were set up in the expo hall where genealogists and software developers could meet on equal ground to try to find solutions together. Computer labs, scanning stations, and research consultants were also incorporated in the expo hall to allow attendees to use the FamilySearch Library without leaving the conference. Keynote speakers included Hewlett–Packard's executive vice president and chief strategy and technology officer Shane Robison, Internet archive founder Brewster Kahle, Allen County Public Library Historical Genealogy department manager Curt B. Witcher, and FamilySearch International CEO Jay Verkler. The 2011 conference was emceed by Teerlink.

The first RootsTech conference was held in Salt Lake City in February 2011, drawing around 3,000 people. It was held again in 2012, drawing 4,500 people. In 2013, it drew 6,700 registered attendees with over 13,600 remote attendees and many attendees and vendors coming from other countries around the world. RootsTech had become the largest genealogy and family history conference held in North America. The 2014 event was held at the Salt Palace where nearly 13,000 attended in person with over 100,000 remote participants. At the 2015 RootsTech conference, Laura Bush and her daughter were keynote speakers. Over 25,000 people were reported to have attended the 2016 RootsTech from 50 US states and 30 countries. In 2019 paid attendees dropped by 10% and live stream views dropped by 28% compared to 2018.

In October 2019, RootsTech held a conference in London, with almost 10,000 people attending.

RootsTech Connect 2021 was transitioned to a free virtual experience hosted online in 11 languages. It was attended by over 1 million participants from 242 countries who were able to watch approximately 2,000 genealogical class sessions on-demand taught by experts, archivists and companies. The 2021 conference included a Genetic Genealogy track, a song contest and a virtual expo hall with 85 exhibitors.

RootsTech 2025 continued to feature a hybrid of online and in-person events. The main speakers were Mylo Fowler, Lindsay Fulton, and Victor Wooten.
