= Juan Bernabe Moreno =

Spanish computer scientist and technology executive

Juan Bernabé-Moreno
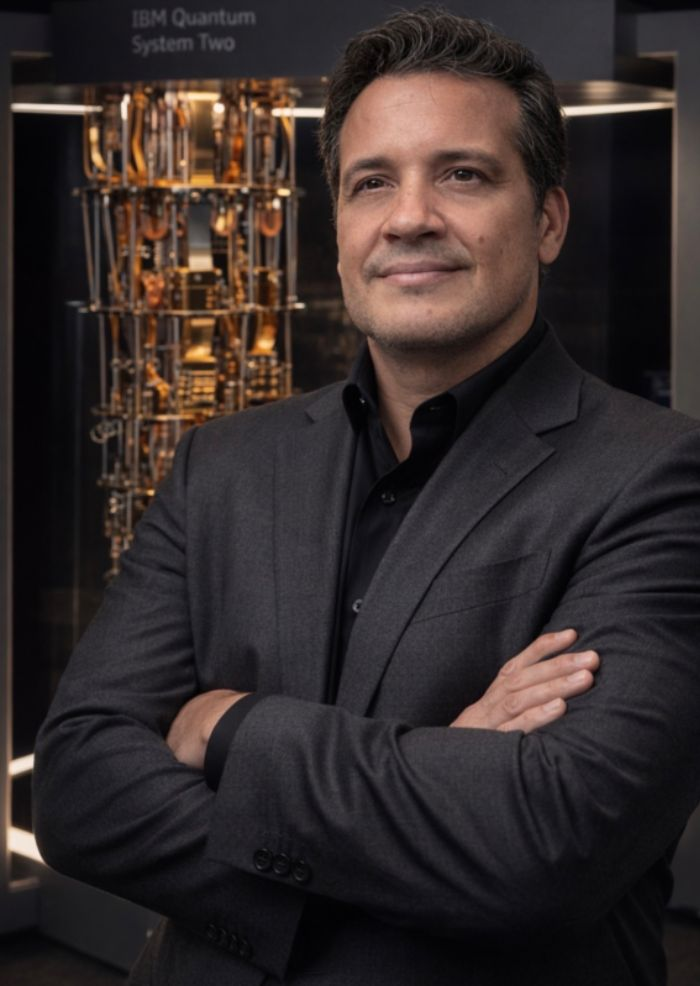
- Bernabé-Moreno in 2026
- Education: University of Granada
- Occupations: Computer scientist; technology executive
- Employer: IBM Research
- Known for: Artificial intelligence; quantum computing; sustainability research

Juan Bernabé-Moreno is a computer scientist and technology executive. As a director of IBM Research Europe for the United Kingdom and Ireland, he leads industrial and academic research initiatives in artificial intelligence, quantum computing, hybrid cloud technologies, and sustainability science.

== Biography ==
Bernabé-Moreno graduated from the University of Granada with both a Master’s degree and a Ph.D.. His academic training focused on data science, artificial intelligence, and information systems.

== Career ==
Bernabé-Moreno began working in data analytics and AI research, later taking leadership roles within the telecommunications industry. He held senior positions at Telefónica Digital and Telefónica Germany, where he led advanced analytics and data science teams focused on large-scale consumer and network data. He subsequently served as chief data officer and Global Head of Analytics and Artificial Intelligence at E.ON, an international energy company. In this role, he led enterprise-wide AI strategy and applied advanced analytics to support the energy transition, grid optimization, and sustainability initiatives. Bernabé-Moreno later joined IBM, where he became Director of IBM Research Europe for the UK and Ireland. He oversees research teams working on artificial intelligence, quantum computing, hybrid cloud platforms, climate change mitigation, and sustainability.

Bernabé-Moreno’s research interests include artificial intelligence, machine learning, data analytics, quantum computing, and applied optimization. He has contributed to research that connects theoretical advances with real-world industrial applications, particularly in large-scale data systems and decision intelligence. He has authored numerous peer-reviewed research papers, holds multiple patents related to data analytics and AI technologies, and has presented at international conferences.
