= Digital strategy manager =

Executive position

A Digital Strategy Manager is a senior management position in a company or organisation. The postholder will have technological knowledge and aim to grow the organisation's digital industry. A digital strategy manager collaborates with marketing, business development, and organizational management teams within the company or organization and uses leadership skills to build strategic partnerships.

The position focuses on a corporation’s digital brand by leading, building and maintaining their presence in the digital world. The person in the position is accountable for prioritizing technology infrastructure for digital advertising continuity across all multimedia platforms. The person in the post manages related IT departments and functions as a link between digital presence and all advertising and/or marketing activities. The employee consults with internal managers to strategize their marketing needs, incorporating a digital technology structure.

Digital strategy manager has become a key post in some museums.

A character in Haterz (2015), a novel by James Goss, says of the post, '"No one really knows what [the job] is, but it involves buying things from Apple geniuses and drinking a lot of coffee".

== See also ==
- Chief digital officer
- Chief innovation officer
- Chief data officer
- Chief marketing officer
