= International Executive Resources Group =

- Abbreviation: IERG
- Formation: 1997; 29 years ago
- Type: Non-profit
- Purpose: Support and development of professionals in international business
- Location: Headquartered in New York City, United States
- Region served: Worldwide
- Members: 400+ (as of May 2011)
- Official language: English
- Website: www.iergonline.com

The International Executive Resources Group (IERG) is an international non-profit professional association for corporate executive-level professionals working in diverse industries whose careers include broad experience in the global arena by having worked in at least two countries and speaking at least two languages. IERG accumulates and distributes expertise and information related to the conduct of global business.

== Organization ==
=== Membership ===
IERG members have extensive international experience. To join the organization, a prospect must demonstrate that he or she has worked for three or more years in a market outside his country of origin. Membership is only by invitation and sponsorship, and application is followed by a screening interview.

Most members are fluent in two or more languages. Members have lived, or now live, in all major geographical or geo-political regions, including Abu Dhabi, Australia, Bangladesh, Brazil, China, Denmark, France, Germany, Hong Kong, Hungary, India, Japan, the Netherlands, Singapore, South Korea, Switzerland, United Kingdom, and the United States.

In addition, prospective members must have held an executive level position. Current IERG members include CEOs, CFOs, CIOs, CMOs, and division presidents from both large and small companies.

IERG encourages senior executives and business people from all functional specializations and a broad range of industries to join. Current members come from the auto industry, energy, banking, financial services, insurance, advertising, fast-moving consumer goods, mining, information technology, and many other industries.

According to a recent survey of members, almost 40% of members joined 7 or more years ago.

=== Structure ===
IERG is governed by a Board of Directors. Many of its routine activities are organized by members who volunteer their time.

IERG has six chapters in the US:

- Boston
- Chicago
- Connecticut
- Dallas
- New York
- Philadelphia
- Southern California

Member-led special interest groups (SIGs) operate across industries and geographic boundaries. SIGs have been founded in:

- China
- Financial Services
- Private Equity
- Premium Consumer Goods

=== Partnerships ===
The Princeton Executive Network (PEN), an association of senior executives living or working within commuting distance of Princeton, NJ, welcomes IERG members to its normally invitation-only meetings.

The British American Business Council (BOAC, www.babcoc.org) of Orange County, CA welcomes participation of IERG members to its invitation-only functions.

=== Programs ===
IERG organizes monthly meetings for its members through each of its chapters. In addition, IERG presents periodic webinars on subjects related to international business, including discussion of current trends in trade, economic and political policy, and multicultural communications. IERG periodically invites accomplished professionals and distinguished personalities (Chairmen, CEOs, authors, and thought leaders) as guest speakers.
