= Chief experience officer =

Corporate officer responsible for overall user experience

A chief experience officer (CXO) is an executive responsible for the overall experience of an organization's products and services. As user experience (UX) is quickly becoming a key differentiator in the modern business landscape, the CXO is charged with bringing holistic experience design to the boardroom and making it an intrinsic part of the company's strategy and culture.

== Responsibilities ==
A CXO's responsibilities include:

- Corporate leadership in UX strategy
- Software and hardware design management
- Creative reviews and concept development
- Intellectual property positioning and protection

In a piece in UX Magazine, Lis Hubert said the goal of having a CXO is "to have someone responsible for curating and maintaining a holistic user-, business-, and technology-appropriate experience" at the C-level. Authors Claudia Fisher and Christine Vallaster state that a CXO or chief marketing officer is a good idea when "the brand is seen as a strategic driver of the organization."

=== In Healthcare ===
Howard Larkin wrote that in healthcare, the CXO is "responsible for making sure every aspect of a complex delivery system consistently meets basic patient and human needs" and what it calls "operationalizing the patient experience mission."

== Perception of title ==
In 2006 the New York Times discussed the role of the chief experience officer in the context of a number of "unconventional" and "wacky" titles being created by Madison Avenue firms with the intent to "signal a realization by an advertiser or agency that in a rapidly changing marketing and media landscape, the time for the tried and true has come and gone".

Management academics of the Wharton Business School have called the proliferation of roles in the C-Suite "Title Inflation."

Corporate futurists Herman and Giola have warned about the "dangerous side effects" of "job title invention."

STLX, the 3,000 member Meetup group created for user experience and service design professionals, holds an annual conference. In 2014 speaker Chris Feix, in his talk titled "Why UX #Fails", argued that any software company that doesn't demonstrate a C-Level investment in UX is doomed to fail.

== Related positions ==
In a 2012 publication, it was reported that "chief customer officer" (30%) and "chief client officer" (15%) were more commonly used for the role than "chief experience officer" (10%), with 45% utilizing other variations.

== See also ==
- User experience
- Experience design
- Customer experience
