= Chief visibility officer =

A chief visibility officer (CVO) or director of visibility is an individual appointed to oversee all aspects of performance across retail stores, corporations or organizations as part of the C-Suite of executives. The role of the CVO emerged to manage the integration of ideas, disciplines, technologies and people focused on elevating retail enterprise visibility. The title is commonly associated with retail loss prevention leaders and professionals who maintain the highest position in security management and maintain the security operations in the store to achieve a high level of visibility.

== Role ==
The CVO is focused on security systems as they contribute to higher profits and elevated store performance levels. The importance of the CVO position has risen as criminals and organized retail crime grows more sophisticated in thwarting security solutions. According to the Centre for Retail Research Global Retail Theft Barometer 2011 study, Total global shrink in 2011 cost retailers $119.092 billion, an average of 1.45% of global retail sales. The shrinkage rate was an average of 6.6% higher than 2010. The losses are said to cost each family $199.89 per that year. Working with security integrators to achieve maximum visibility into what takes place in a retail store on a daily basis allows the CVO to impact not only shrinkage numbers, but also to improve store operations. This approach was cited by the University of Leicester study on Effective Retail Loss Prevention, 10 Ways to Keep Shrinkage Low where it was noted that among the keys to reducing shrinkage in an organization included establishing a senior management commitment, ensuring organisational ownership, embedding loss prevention into the business and providing strong leadership.

== Challenges ==
Shrinkage can occur in a number of different areas for a retailer: employee theft, including sweethearting shoplifting/organized retail crime, administrative error and vendor fraud. The goal of a CVO is to maximize business profits by reducing losses. To accomplish this objective, CVOs analyze the full spectrum of store operations from employee and customer behavior to vendor and supplier patterns and supply chains. Integrated technologies can provide a comprehensive picture of customer behavior, staffing needs and merchandising trends, in addition to preventing losses for the store. The CVO must be in touch with core challenges across an organization to implement and integrate security solutions tailored to protect its unique vulnerabilities. According to securitysales.com retailers are looking beyond standalone technology like electronic article surveillance (EAS) systems or cameras and access control and aiming to have visibility across the demand and supply chain.
