= Ashok Srivastava =

American data scientist

Ashok N. Srivastava is an American business executive and data scientist. He is senior vice president and chief data officer at Intuit, and an adjunct professor of electrical engineering at Stanford University. He is a member of the board of directors of the University of Colorado Foundation, and having joined in 2026, of The Motley Fool. He was named a Fellow of the American Association for the Advancement of Science (AAAS) in 2012, Fellow of the Institute of Electrical and Electronics Engineers (IEEE) in 2014 for his contributions to data mining in the enhancement of the safety of aerospace systems, and Fellow of the American Institute of Aeronautics and Astronautics (AIAA) in 2015.
