= Continuous duty overnight =

Regional airline crew scheduling term

Continuous duty overnights (CDOs) are also referred to as "stand-ups", "naps", or "high-speeds" is a scheduling practice used in regional airline operations to circumvent, or "outsmart" government flight crew minimum rest requirements. A few major airlines may also use them.

A crew working a CDO will generally operate the last flight out at night, have on duty time on the ground (anywhere from 0–8 hours) at the destination and then operate the first flight back in the morning. Since the break between flights is not sufficient to qualify as a free from duty rest period, the crewmembers remain continuously on duty, even though they may have been provided with a hotel room for rest. Crew members would normally require a specific amount of resting hours in between shifts based on their countries and airlines but by using the term continuous duty, they are able to go beyond the specified rest period due to being on duty. Another factor is delays. Because of this set up; delays taken throughout the day that result in a delay the last flight (first flight of a CDO) do not impact the first flight the next day. It would simply reduce the amount of time the crew are on the ground.

The continuous duty overnight schedule could be flown 3–5 times consecutively (i.e., back-to-back).

== Examples ==
- Flight crew report to the airport at 2040 (8:40 pm), which means the crew will have to arrive earlier to park, clear airport security, and get to their operations office to check in. Then they would fly from 2147 to 0037 (2-hour, 50-minute flight). Once at their destination they have 6 hours 13 minutes on the ground. In that time they have to ride to and check in (about 20 minutes) at the hotel. They would get to their hotel room about 0100 and have to be awake at 0530 (30 minutes to get ready) for the 0600 shuttle to the airport, leaving the crew about 4 hours and 30 minutes of “rest”. A 0650 departure and 2-hour, 18-minute return trip gets them to the gate at 0908. After unloading they would be released (still at the aircraft) at 0923. That is a total of 12 hours and 43 minutes on duty, and 5 hours and 8 minutes of flying.
- Flight crew report at 2100, fly from 2200 to 2300, "stand-up" on duty overnight from 2315 to 0515, then fly 0600 to 0700, followed by a rest period from 0700 to 1700. The flight crew would then report at 1700, fly 1800 to 1900, "stand-up" on duty 1915 to 0115, and then fly 0200 to 0300. This example involves only one-hour flights, which are less than the times and number of segments that might typically be flown.

== Other issues ==
Some crews are not provided a hotel by their airline or want to make the most of their time on the ground and resort to sleeping on board in the crew rest compartment or other rest facility. Pilots take off their ties and hang up their shirts. "You don't want to look unprofessional after sleeping in an aircraft," another pilot said. "There are some people that bring sleeping bags and pillows and their own blankets so they don't have to use the airline blankets." In airline slang, this is called 'a camp out.'

== Incidents and accidents from CDOs ==
Runway incursion at Cleveland Hopkins International

Runway incursion at Baltimore-Washington International Airport

Broke 10,000 speed restriction near DTW

Takeoff from the wrong runway at La Crosse

Crew taxied to the incorrect runway at Jacksonville

Low altitude on an ILS approach at Akron-Canton

Takeoff without clearance at Cincinnati

Takeoff in the wrong aircraft at La Crosse

Takeoff without required fuel at Atlanta

Lined up to land on the wrong runway at Chicago O'Hare

Runway incursion at Dallas Fort Worth

Takeoff in the wrong aircraft in Denver

Runway incursion at Kalamazoo
