= Chief Dental Officer =

Chief Dental Officer may refer to:

- Chief Dental Officer (Canada)
- Chief Dental Officers (United Kingdom)
