= Chief solutions officer =

Corporate title

A chief solutions officer (CSO) is a corporate title referring to an executive responsible for the identification, development and delivery of business solutions and services. The primary focus of a chief solutions officer and general manager is to drive growth for the company by creating value for his or her stakeholders. Most often the position reports to the chief executive officer.

== Responsibilities ==
The chief solutions officer is responsible for the identification and design of new products, services and technologies, the development of strategies, capabilities and the inception of programs and projects to exploit those opportunities.

== See also ==
- Chief product officer
- Chief services officer
- Chief technology officer
- Chief information officer
- Chief digital officer
