= Chief architect =

Chief architect may refer to:

- Architecture
  - Chief Dominion Architect
  - Chief Government Architect of the Netherlands
  - Chief architect (Sri Lanka)
- Software architect

== See also ==
- Chief Architect Software
- State architect
