= Climate Data Operators =

Computer software suite

CDO
- Stable release: 2.5.1
- Written in: C
- Operating system: IBM, AIX, CRAY, NEC, Linux, MacOS, FreeBSD, Windows
- License: BSD-3-Clause
- Website: CDO

CDO (Climate Data Operators) is a command line computer software suite providing more than 600 operators for manipulating and analysing climate data.

Supported data formats are:

- netCDF 3/4
- GRIB 1/2
- SERVICE
- EXTRA
- IEG

== Scripting interfaces ==
CDO offers a scripting interface for Ruby and Python.
