= Chief accessibility officer =

C-suite executive position

The chief accessibility officer (CAO) is a C-suite executive position within an organization. The role exists in organizations to improve accessibility for people with physical or mental disabilities.

Key responsibilities of the CAO include ensuring the organization provides accessible products, services and employment for people with disabilities. An organization with a CAO may choose to extend accessibility efforts beyond compliance and assert accessibility as a core business value. Organizations that have adopted a CAO include IBM (2014) and Microsoft (2010) along with the Swedish Public Employment Service (2020).

According to JJ Hanley of JJ's List, the CAO is "somebody who is simultaneously intimately familiar with the company’s product or service offerings and how consumers experience those offerings". The name was first introduced as a position in 2014.

== Implementation ==
In 2010, Microsoft's Robert Sinclair was the first to use the title. In July 2014, IBM appointed Frances West to serve as its first CAO. Other companies have implemented CAO positions.

In June 2019, the Accessible Canada Act established the role of Chief Accessibility Officer within the Government of Canada to provide advice to the Minister of Accessibility and to monitor systemic and emerging accessibility issues. Stephanie Cadieux was appointed to this role in 2022.

== Responsibilities ==
A CAO's responsibilities may include:

- setting an accessibility policy and strategic goals
- managing legal responsibilities associated with risk mitigation
- championing inclusion within other departments, especially human resources and procurement
- working with suppliers and clients to improve practices
- connecting business units to eliminate silos and compartmental thinking
- engaging active stakeholder management with governments and other interest groups

The role can entail a cultural change for organizations, embedding the inclusion of customers with a disability in business models. Accessibility can be seen as a sustainability, branding, or ethical business approach, ensuring the organization serves all customers and employees, including people with disabilities or illiteracy. Working with a broader range of requirements can lead to playing a role in business innovation and transformation. The CAO can be responsible for managing relationships with internal and external stakeholders with a disability.

Requirements of the role include familiarity with accessibility best practice for physical and digital environments.

A familiarity with the barriers that people with disabilities face can be helpful. Other skills might include change management, problem solving, and ability to persuade business entities and departments to embrace accessibility in their culture.

== Alternative titles ==
- Chief Information Accessibility Officer
- Head of Accessibility and Digital Inclusion
- Global Head of Accessibility
- Chief IT Accessibility Officer
