= Chief business officer =

Top operating executive of a company or institution

- Synonyms: CBO

A chief business officer (CBO) is a position of the top-operating executive of growing commercial companies or an academic/research institution (such as a university, college, institute, or teaching hospital). In the commercial space, CBO shows leadership in deal-making experience with a clear record of results and ultimate transactional responsibility. In higher education, the titles of vice president, associate dean, assistant dean, and director are also used for the role of the chief business officer. The CBO generally reports to the chief executive officer (CEO).

== Academics and research institutes ==
The titles of executive vice president and senior vice president are found most often in a university’s central administration office, and a hierarchical relationship does not necessarily exist between those positions and the chief business officer position of a university-affiliated institute or center, which is often at an equivalent level. Several large public school districts in the United States now employ chief business officers to oversee the business operations of the school district as well as the work of individual school business managers. Independent schools increasingly use the chief business officer title to identify the school finance director or school business manager. The chief business officer position in education should not be confused with the unrelated chief commercial officer or chief business development officer positions in other industries. Additionally, the title chief business development officer title is often shortened to chief business officer in biotechnology, information technology, and startup companies.

A CBO is responsible for the administrative, financial, and operations management of the organization, often combining the roles of chief administrative officer (CAO), chief financial officer (CFO), and chief operating officer (COO). As a result, the executive holding the CBO position, by definition, will usually possess a broader range of experience and a more extensive skill set than individuals serving in those C-level positions.

As one of the highest-ranking executives in an academic or research organization, the CBO may oversee strategic planning in addition to budgeting, financial management, contracts, human resources, procurement, compliance, real estate, facilities, information technology, and risk management. At many colleges and universities, sustainability and green building initiatives fall under the purview of the CBO, while other institutions include community and local government relations in the CBO's responsibilities .

== Qualifications ==
Many CBOs typically hold advanced academic degrees (MBA, PhD, etc.) or leading professional credentials and continue to participate in academic research or consulting projects in their areas of expertise. Job experience for the CBO role is generally gained on the job at the department, unit, or program level prior to advancing into a CBO role, although business officers at all levels are sometimes hired from private industry, government, or other non-profit organizations.

Educational requirements for the CBO position vary among different commercial companies and institutions .

== See also ==
- Chief administrative officer
- Chief financial officer
- Chief operating officer
- Chief strategy officer
