= Chief commercial officer =

Corporate executive role

- Synonyms: CCO

The chief commercial officer (CCO) (sometimes referred to as the chief business officer) is an executive-level role, with the holder being responsible for the commercial management and the development of an organization.

It typically involves activities relating to marketing, sales, logistics, product development and customer service to drive business growth and market share.

As a corporate officer position, the CCO generally reports directly to the chief executive officer (CEO) and is primarily concerned with ensuring the integrated commercial success of an organization. The role typically must combine technical knowledge of the relevant field with strong marketing and business development skills.

A CCO is responsible for the customer and the customer interface with the product or service offering, making sure that all functions of the organization are aligned to meet its strategic commercial objectives. This means that they are closely linked to the organization's strategic management function, in drafting, implementing and evaluating cross-functional decisions that will enable an organization to achieve its long-term objectives.
