= Chief networking officer =

The chief networking officer (CNO) is a business networking position in a company or organization. The term refers less commonly to a technical executive position in the computer industry.

== Business networking ==
In the business networking context, a chief networking officer manages the social capital of a company. The CNO connects people and businesses within the company, with other companies, and with consumers. The CNO's mission is to facilitate know-how transfer and information flow, fostering innovation, safeguarding diversity, and facilitating profit growth. Chief networking officers are responsible for creation and cultivation of new communities and acquisition of pre-existing communities. Other definitions, such as one by the Wharton Global Business Forum in India, include managing outreach, communication and logistics, usually in partnership with the chief operating officer."

As the CNO position builds on soft skills culturally common to women, it can advance women’s careers in areas such as public policy and large-scale business development.

== Responsibilities ==
A Chief Networking Officer (CNO) is the corporate business networks portfolio manager. The Chief Networking Officer centrally manages the business networks' environment. Their responsibility is to solve conflicts in ways that serve mutual best interests. The CNO is a direct contact, although not primary, and should be able to assume the management of any partnership with any stakeholders during primary network manager absence. This professional maps out and organizes all resources available inside the network, i.e., contacts, experiences, success stories, knowledge, competences and business opportunities. They set up long-term partnerships with mutually beneficial gains with each stakeholder inside all business networks.

The CNO is concerned with the self-development of each member of the internal network, and qualifying them to reach their goals. The CNO can only directly impact the employees network. All others are outside their direct control. The CNO achieves recognition of peers from various networks, creating interdependence among all parties. The CNO is the business networks' portfolio strategist, acting as coach and trainer during implementation of related projects during transition from existing and traditional model towards a virtual agile global networking enterprise. To successfully implement this project, the CNO must have cooperation from all departments.

The CNO position requires negotiation experience, knowledge of the company, and knowledge of the marketplace plus an understanding of coaching methodology is useful.

== Computer networking ==
In computer networking, the chief networking officer is "responsible for network strategy, advanced network product development, and translation to line products of future networking and distributed computing technologies."
