= Master of Science in Business Analytics =

Graduate degree

A Master of Science in Business Analytics (MSBA) is an interdisciplinary STEM graduate professional degree that blends concepts from data science, computer science, statistics, business intelligence, and information theory geared towards commercial applications. Students generally come from a variety of backgrounds including computer science, engineering, mathematics, economics, and business. University programs mandate coding proficiency in at least one language. The languages most commonly used include R, Python, SAS, and SQL. Applicants generally have technical proficiency before starting the program. Analytics concentrations in MBA programs are less technical and focus on developing working knowledge of statistical applications rather than proficiency.

Business analytics (BA) refers to the skills, technologies, practices for continuous iterative exploration and investigation of past business performance to gain insight and drive business planning.^{[1]} Business analytics focuses on developing new insights and understanding of business performance based on data and statistical methods. In contrast, business intelligence traditionally focuses on using a consistent set of metrics to both measure past performance and guide business planning, which is also based on data and statistical methods. Business analytics can be used to leverage prescriptive analytics towards automation.

== Origin ==
The MSBA was a response to the increasing need of complex data analysis beyond traditional use of spreadsheets such as Microsoft Excel. Since 2001, the increasing volume (amount of data), velocity (speed of data in and out), and variety (range of data types and sources) has created a vacuum for talent. Harvard Business Review noted: “Much of the current enthusiasm for big data focuses on technologies that make taming it possible, including Hadoop (the most widely used framework for distributed file system processing) and related open-source tools, cloud computing, and data visualization,” the article says. “While those are important breakthroughs, at least as important are the people with the skill set (and the mind-set) to put them to good use. On this front, demand has raced ahead of supply. Indeed, the shortage of data scientists is becoming a serious constraint in some sectors.”

== See also ==
- Big Data
- Machine Learning
- Data Mining
- Predictive Analytics
- Decision Theory
- ETL
- Data Management
- Data Warehouse
- Operations research
- Network science
- Agile
