= Chief genealogical officer =

Chief genealogical officer, or CGO is an individual who maintains the genealogical integrity of an organization.

== Notable CGOs ==
- Dr. Edward MacLysaght, who was named chief genealogical officer in the 1940s as part of the Irish Heraldic Authority.
- David Rencher, AG®, CG®, FUGA, FIGRS, FNGS, was named CGO of FamilySearch on May 10, 2009. The purpose of his appointment was to ensure genealogical soundness of products and services offered by FamilySearch.
- Megan Smolenyak Smolenyak held a similar position at Ancestry.com as the Chief Family Historian.
