= Chief Dental Officer (Canada) =

The Chief Dental Officer is an official position created by the Government of Canada to improve the oral health status of Canadians and to increase awareness about the prevention of oral diseases. They report to the Assistant Deputy Minister of the First Nations and Inuit Health Branch and to the deputy minister of health. The first chief dental officer was Peter Cooney. This position was established in 2004.

They are involved in many programs including:

- Oral Health and the Canadian Health Measures Survey: this is used to associate the effect of oral health on major health concerns such as diabetes, respiratory and cardiovascular diseases
- Federal, Provincial, Territorial Dental Director's Working Group: a group in which public dental health programs will be evaluated for effectiveness
- Children's Oral Health Initiative was developed to analyse the difference in oral health of Inuit children and the mainstream population
