= Chief learning officer =

Corporate title

A chief learning officer (CLO) is the highest-ranking corporate officer in charge of learning management. CLOs may be experts in corporate or personal training, with degrees in education, instructional design, business or similar fields.

Qualified CLOs should be able to drive the corporate strategy and align the development of people with the business goals of the organization. A complement of skills, including business analytics, technology, learning theory, performance consulting and scientific inquiry, are important for success.

The CLO may report directly to the CEO, but may also report to the Head of HR or Chief Talent Officer.

== Background ==
In the 1990s, Jack Welch, then CEO of GE, made Steve Kerr his CLO, making GE the first company to have such an officer. Kerr also became the CLO and managing director for Goldman Sachs.

=== Promotion ===
In 2012, Emma Cunis, executive director of the Chartered Institute of Management Accountants spoke at a CLO summit held in Mumbai. Cunis was part of a panel that discussed the cost of not investing in executive learning and development. She quoted former General Electric CEO Jack Welch to make her case: "The Jack Welch of the future cannot be like me. I spent my entire career in the United States. The next head of General Electric will be someone who spent time in Bombay, in Hong Kong, in Buenos Aires…. We have to send our best and brightest overseas and make sure they have the training that will allow them to be global leaders who will make GE flourish in the future."

== Learning techniques ==
There are four types of learning techniques that may be employed by CLOs (Elkeles & Phillips, 2007):

Coaching
Coaching refers to the training and development process wherein the CLO will support and train an individual or team in achieving a specific skill, competence, or goal. The individual or team receiving the coaching may be referred to as the coachee(s) (Flaherty, 2010).
The higher value for a CLO, relative to coaching, is to create a culture of coaching. All managers should become proficient coaches, and data on personal performance and contribution should be available to them. The more informed they are, the better coaches they can be.
Engagement
Engagement refers to the process of being psychologically invested in the learning process. It is often seen as an indicator of success in learning and the CLO will often attempt to maximize engagement of students and measure engagement during a variety of different learning tasks in order to rate their effectiveness (Christenson et.al., 2012).
Many CHROs have found the engagement surveys to be less than useful, because: they capture only a point in time, you tend to only find out what's wrong, the cycle time from survey to action is often long enough to make taking action irrelevant.
Mentoring
Mentoring refers to a personal development relationship in which one more experienced individual will assist a less experienced learning in acquiring a new skill, ability, or competency. This process involves communication and is relationship based. It may be said to include formal transfers of knowledge, social capital, and psychological support (Clutterbuck & Garvey, 2006).
Management training
Management training activities are those activities which specifically relate to improving the management of people. CLOs may also be responsible for providing training and measuring success of skills and competencies related to management functions (Bonner, 2000).

== Measurement techniques ==
Measurement techniques refer to how CLOs measure learning outcome success. These may take several forms and can include standardized tests, one-to-one interviews and discussions with individuals receiving learning assistance, surveys and questionnaires, and measured competency at various tasks before and after the learning activity (Rani, 2004; Rauner & Maclean, 2008). The aim of the use of these measurement techniques is to quantify the success of the learning activity. This allows the CLO to adapt learning activities in future to increase the level of successful outcomes (Jonassen et al., 2008).

== Technology used ==
A wide variety of different technologies may be used by CLOs in order to meet their learning objectives. Popular technologies used include the use of computer software to deliver lessons and tests. Additionally, internet based learning may be used to provide learning at remote locations and enable students to engage with lessons remotely (Iskander, 2008; Facer, 2011).

== Doctoral program ==
The University of Pennsylvania has their own Doctoral Program under their Graduate School of Education called the PennCLO Executive Doctoral Program. It specially prepares the Chief Learning Officers and other senior-level Human Capital Executives for success in their role as learning and talent development leaders.

Additionally, in 2017, Vanderbilt University's Peabody College of Education and Human Development launched an online Doctor of Education in Leadership and Learning and Organizations which aims to train current and prospective Chief Learning Officers and learning leaders in the following three areas:

- Leadership and Organizational Development
- Data and Analytics
- Learning and Design

== Data ==
There is scant data when it comes to the CLO position, considering that the position has only existed since 1991. In terms of salary, Indeed.com reports that the average salary is roughly $81,000 per year, as of May 2015. According to a CLO survey conducted in April 2015, roughly 45% of CLOs are female, which is a remarkably strong number for female representation in the c-suite. As a comparison, just 3% of CEOs are female, according to Pricewaterhouse Coopers.

== Sources ==
- Bonner, D., 2000. Leading Knowledge Management and Learning: Seventeen Case Studies from the Real World of Training, American Society for Training and Development. Available at: Leading Knowledge Management and Learning: Seventeen Case Studies from the Real World of Training
- Christenson, S.L., Reschly, A.L. & Wylie, C., 2012. Handbook of Research on Student Engagement, Springer Science & Business Media. Available at: Handbook of Research on Student Engagement
- Clutterbuck, D. & Garvey, B., 2006. Mentoring in Action: A Practical Guide for Managers, Kogan Page Publishers. Available at: Mentoring in Action: A Practical Guide
- Elkeles, T. & Phillips, J.J., 2007. The Chief Learning Officer (CLO), Routledge. Available at: The Chief Learning Officer (CLO)
- Facer, K., 2011. Learning Futures: Education, Technology and Social Change, Taylor & Francis. Available at: Learning Futures: Education, Technology and Social Change
- Flaherty, J., 2010. Coaching: Evoking Excellence in Others, Routledge. Available at: Coaching
- Iskander, M., 2008. Innovative Techniques in Instruction Technology, E-learning, E-assessment and Education, Springer Science & Business Media. Available at: Innovative Techniques in Instruction Technology, E-learning, E-assessment and Education
- Jonassen, D. et al., 2008. Handbook of Research for Educational Communications and Technology: A Project of the Association for Educational Communications and Technology, Routledge. Available at: Handbook of Research on Educational Communications and Technology
- Rani, J.S., 2004. Educational Measurement and Evaluation, Discovery Publishing House. Available at: Educational Measurement and Evaluation
- Rauner, F. & Maclean, R., 2008. Handbook of Technical and Vocational Education and Training Research, Springer Science & Business Media. Available at: Handbook of Technical and Vocational Education and Training Research
