= Chief diversity officer =

Company executive position

The Chief Diversity Officer (CDO) is the highest corporate officer charged with the management of diversity and inclusion in an organization.

The CDO role may involve: addressing discrimination in the workplace, launching initiatives to change organizational culture, and increasing the range of backgrounds and the representation of staff. Roughly 52% of Fortune 500 companies employ diversity officers.

== Historical background ==
The chief diversity officer serves in an executive level leadership role. According to Billy E. Vaughn, a history of cultural diversity pioneer work conducted by university professors, cultural diversity consultants, and human resource officers precedes the chief diversity officer. Less than 20 percent of Fortune 500 companies employed diversity officers in 2005, but that number had grown to 53 percent in 2022. Only recently has there been a discussion about the appropriate background education and credentials the diversity officer needs. In the business sector, the role remains tied to human resource management functions. Higher education chief diversity officers tend to have doctoral degrees.

== Credentialing ==
Diversity Certification refers to credential training that provides professionals with knowledge and skills for maintaining non-discriminatory and inclusive business practices.

== See also ==
- Diversity (business)
