= Chief analytics officer =

Job title

Chief analytics officer (CAO) is a job title for the senior manager responsible for the analysis of data within an organization, such as a listed company or an educational institution. The CAO often reports to the chief executive officer.

This position, along with that of chief information officer has risen to prominence due to the rise in information technology and data acquisition. The two positions are similar in that both deal with information, but the CIO focuses on the infrastructure required for maintaining and communicating information while the CAO focuses on the infrastructure required for generating and analyzing information. A similar position is that of the chief data officer (CDO); while the CDO focuses on data processing and maintenance, the CAO focuses on providing input into operational decisions on the basis of the analysis. As such, the CAO requires experience in statistical analysis and marketing, finance, or operations. The CAO may be a member of the board of directors of the organization, but this is dependent on the type of organization.

No specific qualification is typical of CAOs in general. Many have advanced degrees in mathematics, statistics, economics, or econometrics but this is by no means universal. Many were analysts in the past.
