= Chief process officer =

A chief process officer (CPO) is an executive responsible for business process management at the highest level of an organization. CPOs usually report directly to the CEO or board of directors. They oversee business process activities and are responsible for defining rules, policies, and guidelines to ensure that the main objectives follow the company strategy as well as establishing control mechanisms.

The CPO defines the process management strategy and related objectives for the company; develops, documents, and introduces the process model; and monitors process compliance.
