= Chief security officer =

Company executive role

A chief security officer (CSO) is an organization's most senior executive accountable for the development and oversight of policies and programs intended for the mitigation and/or reduction of compliance, operational, strategic, financial and reputational security risk strategies relating to the protection of people, intellectual assets and tangible property.

== Responsibilities ==
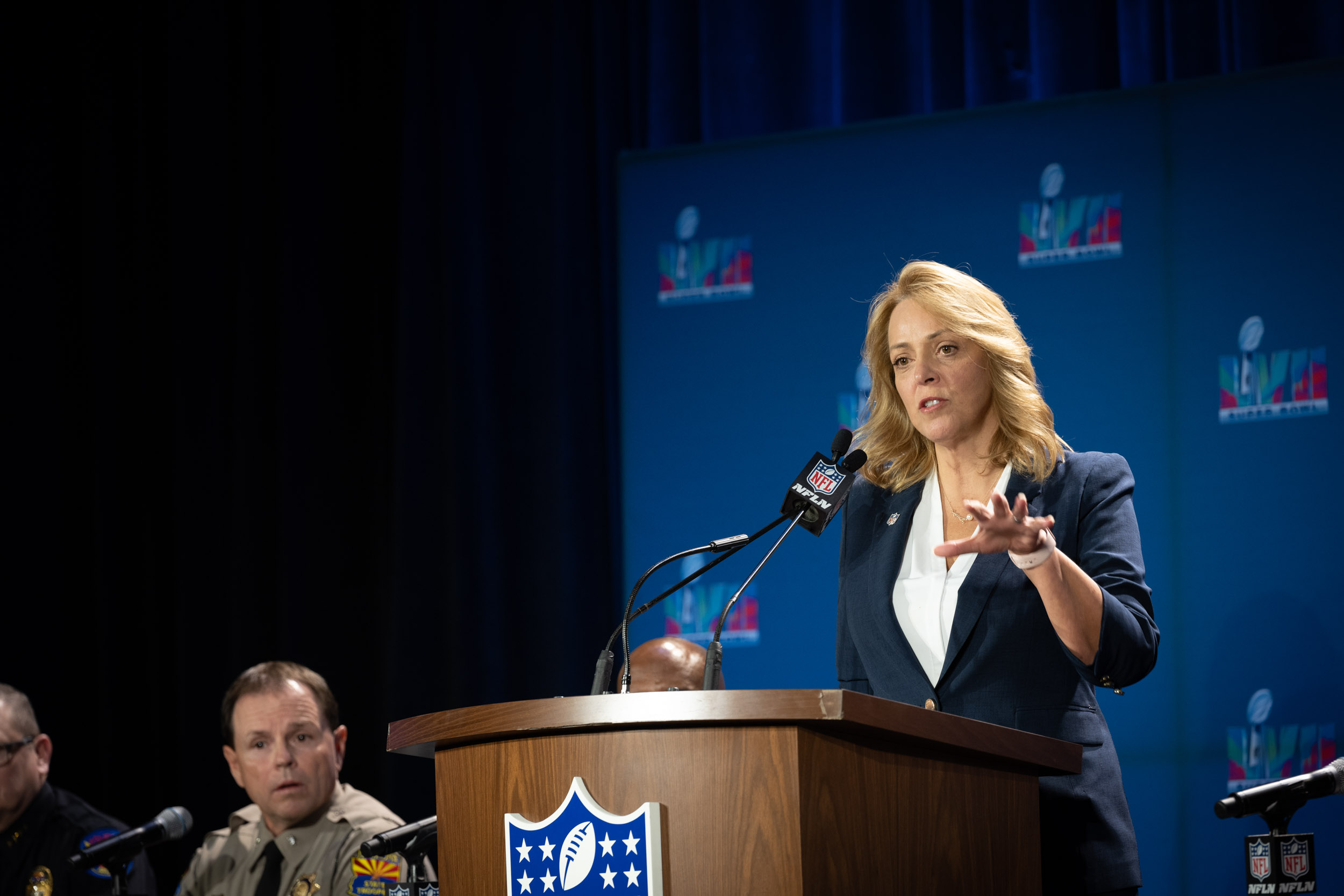
Cathy Lanier, chief security officer for the National Football League

The accountabilities of the CSO include, but are not necessarily limited to:

- In cooperation with the organization’s executive leadership team(s), directs the development of an effective strategy to assess and mitigate risk (foreign and domestic), manage crises and incidents, maintain continuity of operations, and safeguard the organization.
- Directs staff in identifying, developing, implementing, and maintaining security processes, practices, and policies throughout the organization to reduce risks, respond to incidents, and limit exposure and liability in all areas of information, financial, physical, personal, and reputational risk.
- Ensures the organization’s compliance with the local, national, and international regulatory environments where applicable to the accountability of this role (i.e. privacy, data protection, and environmental, health and safety).
- Researches and deploys state-of-the-art technology solutions and innovative security management techniques to safeguard the organization’s personnel and assets, including intellectual property and trade secrets. Establishes appropriate standards and associated risk controls.
- Develops relationships with high-level officials in law enforcement (and international counterparts) to include in-country security (and international security agencies), intelligence, and other relevant governmental functions as well as private sector counterparts [worldwide].
- Through other internal policy committees, personnel and/or other external resources, coordinates and implements site security, operations, and activities to ensure protection of executives, managers, employees, customers, stakeholders, visitors, etc., as well as all physical and information assets, while ensuring optimal use of personnel and equipment.

== Relationship to information security ==
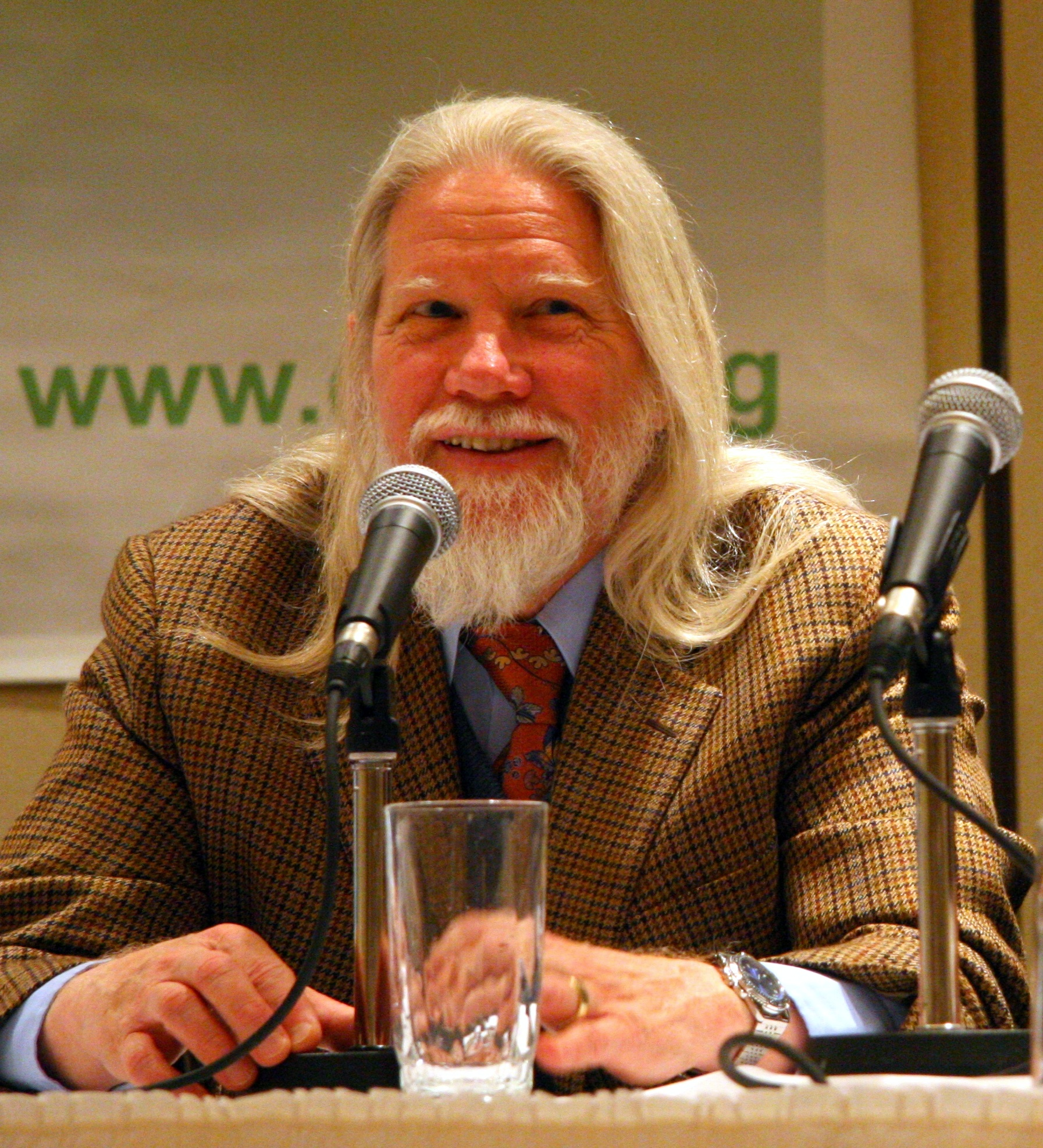
Whitfield Diffie, former chief security officer for Sun Microsystems

Information security, also called digital, cyber, or IT security, is closely related to an organization's security in general. Some organizations have combined various elements of security programs within a chief information security officer (CISO) role. IT security typically addresses security-related risk issues across all layers of an organization's technology stack. This may include:

- Identity and access management
- Incident and crisis management
- Information and privacy protection
- Risk and compliance management
- Security architecture
- Organizational resiliency programs and assessments
- Threat, intelligence and vulnerability management
- Emerging technologies and market trends
