= Chief data officer =

Top information processor in a corporation

A Chief Data Officer (CDO) is a corporate officer responsible for enterprise-wide governance and utilization of information as an asset, via data processing, analysis, data mining, information trading and other means. CDOs usually report to the chief executive officer (CEO), although depending on the area of expertise this can vary. The CDO is a member of the executive management team and manager of enterprise-wide data processing and data mining.

Recently, countries like Canada, Estonia, France, Spain and the United States have established this position of Chief Data Officer. There are ongoing efforts advocating for this role to be more prevalent within government structures to oversee the data strategy and ecosystem of the respective nations.

== Role definition ==
The chief data officer title shares its abbreviation with the chief digital officer, but the two are not the same job. The chief data officer has a significant measure of business responsibility for determining what kinds of information the enterprise will choose to capture, retain and exploit and for what purposes. However, the similar-sounding chief digital officer or chief digital information officer often does not bear that business responsibility, but rather is responsible for the information systems through which data is stored and processed. A chief data officer's purpose is to connect the technological results to the needed business results. Various other roles entail having an understanding of the business value. It means using data to derive business outcomes. It can be achieved by knowing the team members and activities performed, the stakeholder values and understanding customer needs. Some responsibilities include governance, advising & monitoring enterprise data. In terms of operations, it means enabling data usability along with efficiency and availability. They have to innovate which means driving the business towards digital transformation innovation, cost reduction, and revenue generation. Their role is also to provide supporting analytics with reports on products, customers, operations, and markets. They need to protect the data and eliminate data territorialism while also promoting data ethics.

== History and evolution ==
The role of manager for data processing was not elevated to that of senior management prior to the 1980s. As organizations have recognized the importance of information technology as well as business intelligence, data integration, master data management and data processing to the fundamental functioning of everyday business, this role has become more visible and crucial. This role includes defining strategic priorities for the company in the area of data systems and opportunities, identifying new business opportunities pertaining to data, optimizing revenue generation through data, and generally representing data as a strategic business asset at the executive table.

With the rise in service-oriented architectures (SOA), large-scale system integration, and heterogeneous data storage/exchange mechanisms (databases, XML, EDI, etc.), it is necessary to have a high-level individual, who possesses a combination of business knowledge, technical skills, and people skills, guide data strategy. Besides the revenue opportunities, acquisition strategy, and customer data policies, the chief data officer is charged with explaining the strategic value of data and its important role as a business asset and revenue driver to executives, employees, and customers. This contrasts with the older view of data systems as mere back-end IT systems.

More recently, with the adoption of data science the chief data officer is sometimes looked upon as the key strategy person either reporting to the chief strategy officer or serving the role of CSO in lieu of one. This person has the responsibility of measuring along various business lines and consequently defining the strategy for the next growth opportunities, product offerings, markets to pursue, competitors to look at etc. This is seen in organizations like Chartis, AllState and Fidelity. The role of CDOs is broadly accepted in 2019, 67.9% of major companies reported to have appointed a CDO, up from 12.0% in 2012.

== Early CDO appointments ==
- Cathryne Clay Doss of Capital One was appointed chief data officer in 2002.
- Sanket doshi, CDO of Oracle
- Usama Fayyad, chief data officer and senior vice president of Yahoo! in 2005.

== Notable example CDOs ==
- Philip Bourne is associate director for data science at the National Institutes of Health
- Usama Fayyad was the first CDO for Yahoo! in 2004-2009 and also the CDO of Barclays in London from 2013 to 2016. He showed how the role can generate value by creating a $500 million new revenue source based on behavioral Targeting of Ads for Yahoo! in 2008.
- Ashok Srivastava is the chief data officer of Intuit leading artificial intelligence and machine learning at the company.

== Industry and geographic trends in CDOs ==
Following the 2008 credit crisis, many major banks and insurance companies created the CDO role to ensure data quality and transparency for regulatory and risk management as well as analytic reporting. CDOs were originally appointed to focus more executive attention outside the traditional compass of the chief information officer (CIO). During the COVID-19 pandemic the chief data officers demonstrated that navigating the changing situation is important. Businesses need to adapt and innovate in order to continue maintaining profits and survive. Laying out a roadmap is necessary during any disruptions in the business world as the environment changes. The trend is to optimise the use of applied analytics to maximise the business opportunities and innovate. In 2020, the chief data officers worked closely with other executives and focused more on automation. The goal was to reduce the analytic cycle time while also reducing the number of data errors. The liability reduces and gives space to more opportunities and creates a competitive edge. The CDOs find it critical to keep up to date with governance regulations as there are different types of data with various locations. The data-centric laws keep on updating and CDOs should be updated with the laws in the market in which the organization operates and gathers data.
