= Chief business development officer =

Company position title

A chief business development officer (CBDO) is a position within a company established beside the other executive positions reporting to CEO and COO. The title is used to define a high-ranking position alongside the CEO. The CBDO is expected to have a broad and comprehensive knowledge of all matters related to the business of the organization with an eye towards identifying new sales prospects and driving business growth and requirements for product development that will be coordinated with R&D functions.

Responsibilities can include:

- Elaborate business development plans, design and implement processes to support business growth, through customer and market definition.
- Facilitate business growth by working together with clients as well as business partners (suppliers, subcontractors, JV partners, technology providers, etc.).
- Build and maintain high-level contacts with current and prospective customer and other business and project partners.
- Drive prospects through to contract award (including identifying new customers and markets, developing approaches to the market, identifying prospects, proposal preparation, etc.)
- Develop marketing strategy, manage proposal teams and client account managers.
- Develop Applications and other Systems.
