= Chief marketing officer =

Highest ranking executive-level position focusing on marketing

A chief marketing officer (CMO), also called a chief brand officer (CBO), is a C-suite corporate executive responsible for managing marketing activities in an organization. The CMO leads brand management, marketing communications (including advertising, promotions and public relations), market research, product marketing, distribution channel management, pricing, customer success, and customer service.

The CMO typically reports to the chief executive officer and may be reported to by senior vice presidents, vice presidents, directors, and other senior marketing managers. Historically, some jurisdictions have conferred legal responsibility upon marketing chiefs, but the use of modern-day titles typically does not correspond to a legally defined role.

A study from consulting firm Spencer Stuart in 2021 showed that women made up 47% of CMO positions in 2020, an increase from the 43% reported in 2019. 13% of CMOs had a racially or ethnically diverse background in 2020, down from 14% in 2019.

== Responsibilities ==
As part of the senior management, the CMO is involved in developing and adjusting company strategy and plans based on market conditions and competitive dynamics. CMOs may be involved in departments such as production, information technology, corporate communications, documentation, public relations, law, human resources, and finance. One Gartner analyst predicted that in the future CMOs will spend more on IT than their counterpart CIOs, with many modern CMOs handling increasing amounts of customer-facing technology implementations. According to McKinsey, few senior-executive positions will be subject to as much change over the next few years as that of the chief marketing officer.

The CMO is responsible for facilitating growth, sales and marketing strategy. They work towards objectives such as revenue generation, cost reduction, or risk mitigation. The CMO completes tasks that fall into three different categories: Analytical tasks, such as pricing and market research; creative tasks, such as graphic design, advertising and product, and service promotion; and interpersonal tasks, such as coordinating with other company executives in creating alignment on strategy and execution plans.

CMOs see customer loyalty as their top priority in the digital era; their second priority is to design experiences for tablets and mobile apps.

== Challenges ==
The unpredictable effect of marketing efforts and the need to drive profits often leads to a short tenure for most CMOs. Consulting firm Spencer Stuart revealed average CMO tenure in 2020 was 40 months, which was the lowest in a decade. In comparison, the average CEO tenure is 7 years.

In a CMO mapping study done by Raines, CMOs are losing influence. A proportion of CMOs don't feel valued, and many CMOs don't have clear alignment with their CEOs on key performance metrics.

== See also ==
- Digital strategy manager
- Chief web officer
