= Chief customer officer =

Executive position in a company

A chief customer officer (CCO) is the executive responsible in customer-centric companies for the total relationship with an organization’s customers. This position was developed to provide a single vision across all methods of customer contact. The CCO is often responsible for influencing corporate activities of customer relations in the call centre, sales, marketing, user interface, finance (billing), fulfillment and post-sale support. The CCO typically reports to the chief executive officer, and is potentially a member of the board of directors.

Chief Customer Officers may be known by many titles; however, according to the Chief Customer Officer Council, the CCO is properly defined as "an executive who provides the comprehensive and authoritative view of the customer and creates corporate and customer strategy at the highest levels of the company to maximize customer acquisition, retention, and profitability."

Today's customer requires access in many forms of media to meet their preferences and lifestyle, such as traditional voice agent, outsourced/offshored voice agent, automated voice (interactive voice response or IVR), Email, traditional mail, web chat, web collaboration, web co-browse, text, point of presence (PoP) such as sales register or kiosk, faxes, etc.

A consistent customer experience across all methods of access is required by customers, who often choose to change vendors if they do not get the support they require to meet their expectations.

A 2010 study by the Chief Customer Officer Council documented that there are approximately 450 executives worldwide with the CCO title or having comparable authority and responsibilities under a different title. While growing from fewer than 30 in 2003, CCOs are the newest, and by far the smallest, component of the C-suite. With an average tenure of just 29 months, the chief customer officer has the shortest lifespan among all C-suite executives.

Because the CCO role is still so new, there is as yet no executive MBA program or even a Harvard Business Review treatise about becoming a CCO. Jeanne Bliss, who was the Chief Customer Officer for Lands' End, Microsoft, Mazda, Coldwell Banker and Allstate Corporations has written multiple books on the role of the Chief Customer Officer based on her twenty five years' experience in the role.

While not a requirement that the CCO be a board-level position, to be effective, the Chief Customer Officer Council advises that the CCO must be one of the senior-most executives of the company. Chief Customer Officers typically report directly to the CEO, although there are some exceptions.

A 2009 study of over 860 corporate executives revealed that companies that had increased their investment in customer experience management over the previous three years reported higher customer referral rates and customer satisfaction (Strativity Group, 2009).

In 2011, the Customer Experience Professionals Association was created to support and encourage the growth of the customer experience profession and the role of the Chief Customer Officer. CXPA is a by-members, for-members professional association composed of several thousand customer experience professionals worldwide. CXPA created the Certified Customer Experience Professional (CCXP) credential.
