= Chief administrative officer =

Corporate title

A chief administrative officer (CAO) is the top-ranking officer with overall management over a major intergovernmental organization (IGO). CAOs are appointed by the CEO and report directly to them or the Board of Directors.

== Government and non-profit ==
A CAO is responsible for administrative management of private, public or governmental organizations and the de facto head of the organization.

In a municipal context, the title is usually used as an alternative for city manager, county administrator, or county executive, particularly in cases where the position does not include powers such as the authority to appoint or dismiss department heads.

In the United Kingdom, CAOs of public companies must be chartered secretaries (Institute of Chartered Secretaries and Administrators), lawyers, certified/chartered accountants, or others with equivalent experience.

== Non-government corporations ==
The CAO is one of the highest-ranking members of an organization, managing daily operations and usually reporting directly to the chief executive officer. In some companies, the CAO is also the president. It is very similar to a chief operating officer but is not the same as a chief executive officer, which is a more senior title in for-profit corporations. It is typical for a company that does not manufacture a physical product to have a CAO in place of a COO, particularly in technology organizations.

== United Nations ==
The Secretary-General of the United Nations is the de facto head of the United Nations and, according to the United Nations Charter, is chief administrative officer. The United Nations describes the secretary-general's role as: Equal parts diplomat and advocate, civil servant and CEO, the secretary-general is a symbol of United Nations ideals and a spokesman for the interests of the world's peoples, in particular the poor and vulnerable among them. The charter also empowers the secretary-general to "bring to the attention of the Security Council any matter which in his opinion may threaten the maintenance of international peace and security". These guidelines both define the powers of the office and grant it considerable scope for action. One of the most vital roles played by the secretary-general is the use of his "good offices", steps taken publicly and in private, drawing upon his independence, impartiality and integrity, to prevent international disputes from arising, escalating or spreading.

The secretary-general appoints all staff at the United Nations.

== History ==
In Brunei, chief administrative officer was the highest rank of governmental officers in Japanese occupied Brunei under the Japanese governor. The first chief administrative officer was Inche Ibrahim (known later as Pehin Datu Perdana Menteri Dato Laila Utama Awang Haji Ibrahim), a former secretary to the British resident, Ernest Edgar Pengilly.
