= Chief knowledge officer =

A chief knowledge officer (CKO) is a loosely defined role in some organizations that achieved some prominence during the 1990s and 2000s that supervises knowledge management. In general, their duties involve intellectual capital and organizing preservation and distribution of knowledge in an organization. The position sometimes overlaps with the title of "chief information officer"; CIOs tend to be more focused on information technology within an organization (computer systems and the like), while CKOs have more nebulous portfolios including matters such as overseeing patent applications, internal training and documentation, knowledge sharing, and promoting innovative research.

CKOs are frequently directly appointed by the CEO given their broad domains, since their responsibilities generally cut across organizational boundaries. As a result, exactly what a CKO works on can vary greatly from organization to organization.

By the 2010s, the role became less common; while knowledge management programs are still an important part of corporations and other organizations, a direct officer called chief knowledge officer has fallen out of favor somewhat.
