= Chief strategy officer =

Corporate title

A chief strategy officer (CSO) is an executive that usually reports to the chief executive officer (CEO) and has primary responsibility for strategy formulation and management, including developing the corporate vision and strategy, overseeing strategic planning, and leading strategic initiatives, including mergers and acquisitions, transformation, partnerships, and cost reduction. Some companies give the title of chief strategist or chief business officer to its senior executives who are holding the top strategy role.

The need for a CSO position may be a result of CEOs having less time to devote to strategy along with uncertain and increasingly complex global environments. This increases the need for professional strategy development. As a result, the position can be seen in fast moving tech companies, as well in academic, and nonprofit organizations. In recent years, the CSO position increased in popularity in highly professional companies with significant growth and scalability ambitions, which is reflected by the high number of US tech companies (nearly 50% of S&P 500 firms) who created CSO positions in their top management teams. According to a 2013 IBM survey, 67% of CEOs named the CSO as a crucial role–second only to the CFO, and more recent examples and studies by major recruiting firms have shown that CSOs had the highest growth in C-Suite positions being directly elevated to the CEO position.

== Responsibilities ==
The CSO is an advisory and a deal making role; both a leader and doer, with the responsibility for defining the corporate vision and architecting the corporate strategy, ensuring that it maximizes financial value and is achievable from an operational point of view. They are often responsible for the inorganic plan and execution, including M&A as well as ensuring that the corporate portfolio of businesses are optimized to support the strategy. They often lead cross-business strategic initiatives. The CSO must see the issues confronting the company from as broad a perspective as the chief executive does, and the CSO is often heavily involved in operational day-to-day projects working close together with key staff on business critical initiatives in order to utilise proven leadership capabilities and support less senior team members with coaching and deliver based on the CSO's high capacity project management and execution engine. This unique background takes a multitude of different operating experiences, and must include being both a creative thinker and influential collaborator. In quite a few cases, CSOs may be charged with overall business development including identifying gaps in the business or capabilities portfolios. They then make build, buy, or partner decisions to best fill those gaps. The Chief Strategy Officer oversees the company's M&A agenda, strategic partnerships, joint ventures, and divestitures. M&A responsibilities include not only identifying, evaluating, structuring and executing deals, but also managing or supporting related aspects to the deal such as financing and post-merger integration. The business development role can also encompass licensing deals and venture capital investments that support the strategic agenda. CSOs are often executives who have worn many hats at a variety of companies before taking on CSO position.

Typical CSO responsibilities include:

- Develop a comprehensive, inclusive strategic plan and growth strategy by collaborating with the CEO, senior leadership and the board of directors, which determines the enterprise's overall vision, evaluates the overall business portfolio, and M&A plan
- Analyze macroeconomic factors, competitive dynamics, market share changes, organization capabilities (e.g., product line performance), government regulation, and strategic risks
- Identify and often execute important capital projects, joint ventures, potential M&A targets and other strategic partnership opportunities.
- Driving decision-making that creates medium- and long-term improvement.
- Establish and reviewing key strategic priorities and translating them into a comprehensive strategic plan, and monitor the execution of the strategic plan.
- Lead capital allocation and long range planning tied to the strategic plan
- Facilitate and driving key strategic initiatives through inception phases
- Actively support the CEO and BoD on strategic initiatives and inorganic investments
- Oversees the company's M&A agenda and developing and negotiating strategic partnerships and/or divestments.
- Ensure departmental/unit strategic planning projects reflect organizational strategic priorities.
- Partner with institutional leadership, special committees, and consultants to support execution of key initiatives.

As a senior strategic leader, collaborate with other functions within the organization, specifically:

- Collaborate with the communications function and investor relations to message a company's strategy internally and externally
- Collaborate the R&D and operations organization by evaluating low-key and pragmatic testing of new tech products from a customer perspective.
- Collaborate with the CFO to develop a capital plan in line with the organization's strategy, investment policies, and fund raising plans for acquisitions.

In terms of the CSO's role, which varies significantly from organization to organization and evolves over time, the two basic roles strategy developer and strategy implementer are observable. This dichotomy can be further divided into four CSO archetypes.

- Strategic Advisor: focused almost exclusively on strategy formulation, portfolio management and leading strategic initiatives, and is often the primary archetype associated with the CSO.
- Financial Advisor: have specialized capital markets deal related skills that are not otherwise present within an organization that can be used to implement inorganic strategic changes. (e.g., M&A, investments, JV, corporate development)
- Coach: work to provide information to strategy creators and facilitate communication between teams, team members and stakeholders.
- Change Agents: facilitate and enable transformation. This archetype and the coach has evolved into a new c-suite role called a chief transformation officer or overlaps with the chief operating officer role.

== Qualifications ==
CSOs often hold more advanced degrees, commonly a Master of Business Administration (MBA). Many executives holding the top strategy spot have had extensive experience in strategy development often at top management consulting firms, where they can obtain strategy experience across a broad spectrum of industries, c-suite teams, and strategic problems. In addition, many chief strategy officers also have backgrounds outside of strategy such as P&L management, operations, or corporate development in addition to their strategy experience. An HBR study found that the most successful CSOs have some planning, functional, or line-management skills in addition to their core strategy skills before assuming the top strategy role. They tend to have previous work experience at top management consulting firms or strategy-related work at other companies.

== Chief global strategist ==
A chief global strategist (CGS) is one of the highest-ranking corporate officers, administrators, corporate administrators, executives, or executive officers, in charge of the global strategy and the domestic and international expansion of a corporation, company, organization, or agency.

The position is relatively new in the private sector, and a reflection of the influence of globalization upon companies and other organizations that seek to expand their influence, whether as a matter of necessity to survive, or the exploration of an opportunity.

A prominent example of a CGS is Howard Schultz of Starbucks Corporation who was chairman and CEO; however, in 2000 he left the position of CEO to become the chief global strategist. Schultz returned to his previous role as CEO on January 18, 2008.
