= Chief digital officer =

Highest-ranking officer over digital operations

A chief digital officer (CDO) or a chief digital information officer (CDIO) is an individual who helps a company, a government organization or a city drive growth by converting traditional "analog" businesses to digital ones using the potential of modern online technologies and data (i.e., digital transformation), and at times oversees operations in the rapidly changing digital sectors like mobile applications, social media and related applications, virtual goods, as well as web-based information management and marketing.

== Responsibilities ==
The responsibilities of an organization's CDO are varied and still evolving as the future of a CIO for digital businesses. The CDO is not only a digital expert, but may also be a seasoned general manager. As the role frequently is transformational, CDOs generally are responsible for the adoption of digital technologies across a business. As with most senior executive titles, the responsibilities are set by the organization's board of directors or other authority, depending on the organization's legal structure. The CDO is responsible not just for digital consumer experiences across all business touchpoints, but also for the whole process of digital transformation.

== Role prevalence ==
According to a study by Gartner, a predicted 25% of businesses will have created and filled the chief digital officer title by 2015. Research by PwC in 2020 indicates that 21% of large public enterprises had created such a role by 2020, with growth decelerating.

== See also ==
- Digital strategy manager
