= Garbage theft (disambiguation) =

Garbage theft may refer to:

- Dumpster diving, the practice of sifting through trash to find discarded items that may be useful
- Return fraud, a type of crime involving returning goods to a retailer in exchange for money or other goods
- Garbage theft, the practice of sifting through people's trash on private property to profit from items that can be resold or traded for a cash refund and for the purposes of identity theft and fraud.
