= Alfonso de Borbón =

Alfonso de Borbón may refer to:

- Alfonso XII of Spain
- Alfonso XIII of Spain
- Infante Alfonso, Duke of Calabria (1901–1964)
- Alfonso, Prince of Asturias (1907–1938)
- Alfonso, Duke of Anjou and Cádiz (1936–1989)
- Infante Alfonso of Spain (1941–1956)
- Alfonso de Borbón y Borbón (1866–1934)

== See also ==
- Alfonso de Bourbon
