= ShipHero =

American logistics technology company

ShipHero is an American logistics technology company that develops warehouse management software (WMS). It is based in New York.

== History ==
ShipHero was founded in 2013 by Aaron Rubin as a warehouse management system for e-commerce shippers.

In May 2020, ShipHero expanded its operations to include physical fulfillment, opening its first warehouse facility. During the early stages of the COVID-19 pandemic later in 2020, its fulfillment division opened a 200,000-square-foot third-party logistics warehouse in North Las Vegas, Nevada.

In 2021, ShipHero raised US$50 million in a funding round led by Riverwood Capital, resulting in a valuation of US$225 million. In 2022, ShipHero completed five acquisitions, and expanded its footprint to 1.1 million square feet. Acquisitions included Utah-based Golden Egg Solutions, Florida-based Cargo Cove, and the Richmond Hill, Ontario-based provider Delivery Net. The acquisition of Delivery Net in May 2022 added 250,000 square feet of warehousing in the Toronto area.

In August 2024, ShipHero separated its fulfillment business into a dedicated third-party logistics subsidiary named LVK, with Maggie Barnett appointed as chief executive officer.

== Operations ==
ShipHero is based in New York and develops warehouse management software while its subsidiary LVK manages five warehouses in the United States and two in Canada.

== Platform ==
ShipHero platform is a cloud-based warehouse management software developed for e-commerce and 3PL providers. Its main features include order and returns management, mobile-enabled pick and pack workflows, real-time carrier rate generation, and inventory reporting.
