= Package redirection scam =

Form of e-commerce fraud

A package redirection scam is a form of e-commerce fraud, where a malicious actor manipulates a shipping label, to trick the mail carrier into delivering the package to the wrong address. This is usually done through product returns to make the merchant believe that they mishandled the return package, and thus provide a refund without the item being returned. It can also be done by the seller, generally by creating fraudulent online stores or creating fake listings on sites such as eBay or Mercari. This makes it very hard to perform a chargeback, as the tracking shows the item has been delivered. This is also known as an FTID scam, standing for Fake Tracking ID. When this scam is successful, the tracking number will show that the package has been delivered to the correct address, when the package was instead delivered to a different address. This package is generally empty or filled with garbage. However, this scam has mostly been “patched” via new technology provided by the various couriers globally. It is estimated the scam cost retailers £18,000,000,000 in lost revenue.

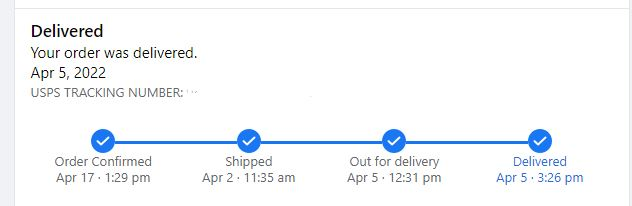
An example of a successful FTID scam on Facebook Marketplace. Note the order date being after the "delivery" date.

== Methods ==
Multiple methods are used to trick the carrier into misdelivering the package. Usually, the scammer will edit the label. Various edits are possible, for example, changing the shipping address, removing barcodes, removing any indication that the package is a return, or printing certain parts of the label in disappearing ink. The scammer would then contact the company some weeks after the package is delivered, and demand a refund. As the company has no record of the return, a refund may be provided without the items being returned, as the company believes they mishandled the return. However, an edited label, if recovered, can prove that a package redirection scam occurred.

Some scammers may put the return label on an advertisement and remove all shipping information except for the barcode. This may cause the company to throw out the 'return', thinking it is junk mail. This serves the same purpose as a package redirection scam; the company believes they mismanaged the return and refunds the scammer's money.

It is also possible to remove the label after shipping the item. In February of 2021, a Canadian man was arrested for a return fraud scheme, where he would place devices that would remove the label after shipping the return. This resulted in the package being delivered to the wrong address, or lost entirely. Police recovered $20,000 in stolen merchandise and $25,000 in cash. 28 year old Christopher Lim was charged with 23 counts of public mischief, 12 counts of fraud under $5,000, and 18 counts of possession of property obtained through a crime.

There is also a similar scam where a low value item is ordered on a site such as AliExpress, and shipped to a different address in the seller's ZIP code in place of a return. Some merchants may provide a refund upon seeing the item delivered to the same ZIP code; however this is generally used by fake online stores when selling items. This scam exploits a flaw in the tracking system; online tracking will usually only show the ZIP code the package was delivered to, instead of the full address.

== Lost in transit scam ==
The lost in transit scam is similar to the FTID scam, but instead of the package being redirected, it is intentionally lost in transit. As the package is lost, the shipping insurance will pay out, and the scammer will get their refund. Methods used to accomplish this can range from disappearing ink, thin paper, corrosive substances used to destroy the box after shipping, or even package bombs.

== "Refunding" fraud ==
On the internet, there are illegal services that allow you to receive a fraudulent refund, and keep the item you ordered. These are known as "Refunders". When hired, refunders will impersonate you and socially engineer the company into providing a refund. The "refunders" will then take a cut of the refund, usually 10-40%. The main method used by these Refunders is the package redirection scam.

== Prevention ==
This scam is particularly difficult to prevent. While the merchant may know the package was never delivered, the return tracking may allow the fraudster to win a chargeback claim. In the case of marketplaces such as eBay, the site is programmed to automatically refund the money within 2 days of return package delivery. This can be very hard to reverse, especially if the scammer closes their account or cancels the card used to purchase the item.

When the postal carrier marks an item as delivered, the GPS coordinates of the delivery are recorded. If these coordinates do not match the intended delivery address, this can serve as evidence of fraud. The person who received the fraudulent return may also choose to retain the package and hand it to the authorities. The weight of the package can also be used to prove fraud, as scammers generally use an empty envelope. However, some scammers may place garbage in the package to match the weight of the item, complicating the process.

== See also ==
- Return fraud
- Retail loss prevention
- fraud
- Organized retail crime
- Shoplifting
