= The Devil Is a Part-Timer! season 1 =

2013 Japanese anime series Season 1

The Devil Is a Part-Timer!
- Season 1
- Cover of the sixth and final Blu-ray volume released by Pony Canyon in Japan on December 4, 2013.
- No. of episodes: 13

Release
- Original network: Tokyo MX
- Original release: April 3 – June 29, 2013

Season chronology
- Next → Season 2

The Devil Is a Part-Timer! is a 2013 Japanese anime series based on the light novels of the same name written by Satoshi Wagahara. The anime is produced by White Fox and directed by Naoto Hosoda, with series composition by Masahiro Yokotani, character designs by Atsushi Ikariya, art direction by Yoshito Takamine and sound direction by Jin Aketagawa. The thirteen episode series premiered between April 4 and June 27, 2013, on Tokyo MX and was later aired on KBS, SUN-TV, BS Nittele, TV Aichi and AT-X. Pony Canyon released the series in Japan on six Blu-ray and DVD volumes starting on July 3, 2013. The anime was acquired by Funimation for streaming in North America. Manga Entertainment later licensed the series for distribution in the United Kingdom. This was followed by an acquisition by Siren Visual for home media distribution in Australia and New Zealand and online streaming on AnimeLab in 2014.

The opening theme is "ZERO!!" by Minami Kuribayashi, while the ending theme is "Gekka" (月花; lit. 'Moon Flower') by Nano Ripe. Other ending themes by Nano Ripe include "Star Chart" (スターチャート) used in episode 5 and "Tsumabiku Hitori" (ツマビクヒトリ) used in episode 13.

== Episode list ==
No. overall	No. in season	Title (Note: All English titles are taken from Funimation.)	Original release date (Note: The Devil Is a Part-Timer! premiered in Tokyo MX's Thursday 22:00 (10:00 pm JST) time slot.)	Ref.
1	1	"The Devil Arrives in Sasazuka"; Transliteration: "Maō, Sasazuka ni Tatsu" (Japanese: 魔王、笹塚に立つ)	April 4, 2013	
In another dimension where magic exists, the Dark Lord Satan wages a campaign with his four generals, Adramelech, Lucifer, Alciel, and Malacoda, to conquer the continent of Ente Isla and annex the human population under his realm of darkness. However, a brave Hero appears and leads the human armies against the dark forces, pushing them back to their stronghold. Here, Satan faces off against the Hero, but with neither able to decisively defeat the other and his armies crumbling, the Dark Lord retreats, and along with Alciel, opens a dimensional portal and leaves their world, vowing to return and conquer Ente Isla one day. The portal exits in modern-day Sasazuka, Japan, and, in addition to being shocked by their new human forms, Satan and Alciel are taken to the nearest police station, where Satan learns a bit about this new world, which lacks magic. As events progress, Satan and Alciel, get new identities: Sadao Maō and Shirō Ashiya respectively, secure a residence, open a bank account and go job hunting in order to survive, while agreeing that Sadao would work while Shirō takes care of their domestic needs. Some time later, on his way to his part-time job at a MgRonald franchise, Sadao encounters a beautiful scarlet-haired girl at a crosswalk and offers her his umbrella to shield from the rain. While at MgRonald, Sadao not only experiences a seemingly random mild earthquake, but faces a dilemma on whether to use his remaining magic to repair the broken fryers, eventually not getting the chance to. Nonetheless, while impressing his fellow co-worker Chiho Sasaki with his people skills as well as the higher-ups through his dedication, Sadao is able to secure a permanent position. As he excitedly pedals his bicycle home to tell Shirō, he is once again confronted by the scarlet-haired girl who is revealed to be the Hero from their dimension, Emilia Justina.
2	2	"The Hero Stays at the Devil's Castle for Work Reasons"; Transliteration: "Yūsha, Shigoto Yūsen de Maōjō ni Tomaru" (Japanese: 勇者、仕事優先で魔王城に泊まる)	April 11, 2013	
In the wake of Satan and Alciel's departure from Ente Isla, Emilia and her comrades give chase. Back in present-day Japan, Sadao tries to reason with Emilia; now under the identity Emi Yusa, although she ignores and tries to attack him. Afterwards, they are both arrested and brought to a police station for questioning where the officer in charge mistakes them for having a couple's quarrel, much to Emi's protest. On their way home, Emi threatens Sadao although he just shrugs. The following day while feeling angry that she isn't living a better lifestyle than Sadao, Emi pays them a visit. Shirō, in shock, locks her out but lets her in after Sadao casually explains her circumstances. After commenting on Sadao's lifestyle, she explains that she along with Archbishop Olba Meiyā were going to follow them through the portal before it disappeared but she ended up being the only one transported. Over the next few days, Emi begins stalking Sadao and Shirō around town and learns that they are living good humble lives. This prompts her to ask him after work if he had considered staying in the human world, to which he boldly states that he will return to conquer Ente Isla. Just then, they both come under a magical attack from a sniper and hurriedly escape. Sadao realizes they may have a common enemy and blames Emi before leaving for the night. Emi however shows up again at his apartment much to his suspicion and awkwardly asks if she could stay the night since she lives a distance away and lost her wallet while they were escaping. Sadao casually gives her sanctuary again to Shirō's shock while Emi tearfully ponders to herself how she got herself into that situation. That night, Sadao receives a mysterious text from Chiho warning that more earthquakes are on the way while asking for his advice.
3	3	"The Devil Goes on a Date with His Junior in Shinjuku"; Transliteration: "Maō, Shinjuku de Kōhai to Dēto Suru" (Japanese: 魔王、新宿で後輩とデートする)	April 18, 2013	
The following morning the national news broadcasts a report mentioning the attack that Emi and Sadao were involved in while Chiho excitedly prepares for her date with Sadao. Meanwhile Emi receives an anonymous call at work from the same enemy who shot at them, who explains that killing both her and Satan would be in Ente Isla's best interests. Later, the police track down Sadao from his bicycle left at the scene and Emi is forced to vouch for his identity while afterwards warning him about their common enemy. Later, Sadao meets Chiho for their date which, unbeknownst to them are followed by a cautious Shirō and a suspicious Emi, the latter of whom drags Shirō into the cafe to eavesdrop on Sadao. During the date, Chiho explains to Sadao that she had been hearing a strange language recently (the language of Ente Isle unknown to her). She further explains that the speakers were trying to contact someone and made references to a large earthquake soon to occur. Sadao realizes that the phenomena was a magical communication system called "Idea Link" and that the earthquakes were most likely caused by a Sonar Spell trying to detect him and Emi. At this time a shocked Sadao notices Emi walk into the cafe and before Chiho can confess to him, she is interrupted by Emi. Chiho misunderstands Emi's reasoning for her interruption and they get into a loud argument, just as a large earthquake suddenly strikes. When Chiho briefly awakens, surrounded by devastation, she reconciles with Emi who again warns her about Sadao before knocking her out with a Sleep Spell. Emi then calls out to Satan who appears from some debris in his demonic form. Emi ponders killing him right there with her remaining magic but Satan shocks her by stating he will get them out of the collapsed mall, leaving Emi to wonder why he would help them.
4	4	"The Hero Experiences Human Warmth"; Transliteration: "Yūsha, Kokoro no Atatakasa ni Fureru" (Japanese: 勇者、心の温かさに触れる)	April 25, 2013	
Satan continues to use his magic to clear the debris while keeping everyone in the mall out of harm's way. While outside the destroyed mall, Emi has a flashback showing her carefree days with her father on Ente Isla when she was younger until she was summoned by the Church to begin training with a magical sword to slay demons. Soon after, her father was killed by Satan's forces when their village was attacked, leaving her with resolve to kill him. Back in the present, Sadao learns and informs Emi that Chiho received magical feedback from the spell he cast on her father, Inspector Sasaki when he first arrived in Japan. Sadao further explains to her that the earthquake was a deliberate attack on their lives before they both leave. Afterwards Emi spends the night at her co-worker, Rika Suzuki's place where Rika explains to her how human nature can change in the face of adversity by referencing the Kobe earthquake she experienced as a child. The next day, Emi visits Sadao and falls down his apartment building's stairs. Sadao tries to treat Emi's injuries but his uncharacteristic kindness upsets her and she reveals her reason for wanting him dead. Sadao laments his inability to understand people's feelings until they are interrupted by Shirō and Chiho. Chiho misunderstands Emi and Sadao being a couple and runs away with a broken heart. Just then, Sadao's landlady, Miki Shiba comes in, and advises they chase after Chiho while referencing her connection to the Sonar and Idea Link Spells. While tearfully making her way through the street, Chiho encounters a strange person who manifests black wings in front of the passersby. As Sadao, Emi and Shirō approach from afar, an explosion occurs and the winged person takes to the air. As Sadao and co. climb the rubble, Sadao acknowledges the person as his Demon General, Lucifer.
5	5	"The Devil and the Hero Save Sasazuka"; Transliteration: "Maō to Yūsha, Sasazuka o Sukuu" (Japanese: 魔王と勇者、笹塚を救う)	May 2, 2013	
Emi asks Lucifer how he survived their previous battle on Ente Isla but Sadao deduces that he was aided by her former comrade Olba Meiyā who had promised to return Lucifer to Heaven in exchange for his help, while Olba reveals himself to Emi's shock. Lucifer proceeds to attack Sadao and co. with Shirō taking a hit. As the group flee, Sadao explains to Emi that Lucifer draws his magic from negative emotions and hence was responsible for the string of muggings in Sasazuka. As they get cornered, Sadao teleports himself and Emi to the crowded Sasazuka Station. Here, the dumbstruck crowd looks on as Lucifer seemingly kills Sadao with a magical bullet and then destroys the overhead transport bridge. The debris head to crush Emi and Chiho but Satan emerges in his demonic form and using the negative emotions of the onlookers to fuel his magic, saves Emi and Chiho. After, Satan sets up a magical barrier, knocking all of the civilians unconscious while Emilia calls forth her magic and engages Lucifer in aerial combat. Alciel then shows up, healed, in his demonic form and joins the battle. Chiho looks on at the incredible scene at which point Satan finishes Olba and then Lucifer with a multi-layered magical punch. In the aftermath, Sadao and co. officially introduce themselves to Chiho. Just then Emi's comrades from Ente Isla, Emeralda Etūva and Albertio Ende arrive through a portal, reunite with Emi and explain the corrupt state of the Church back on Ente Isla. Afterwards at Sadao's apartment, Albertio explains he used the Sonar and Idea Link Spells which were intercepted by Chiho. Meanwhile, Satan uses his remaining magic to restore the city along with erasing the civilian's minds. Later, at MgRonald, Sadao explains to Chiho that he has enough left to erase her mind causing her to yell at him.
6	6	"The Devil Climbs the Stairway to School"; Transliteration: "Maō, Gakkō no Kaidan o Noboru" (Japanese: 魔王、学校の階段を昇る)	May 9, 2013	
At the Church's Headquarters on Ente Isla a report is made by a girl stating that the Archbishop Olba's previous report that he killed the Dark Lord, Emilia, Emeralda and Albertio was false and they discuss the consequences of letting the truth leak to the rest of the church that they remain alive. Meanwhile, back in Japan, Lucifer, now wanted by the police in connection with the recent muggings, moves in with Sadao and Shirō under the name Hanzō Urushihara, while becoming proficient using the internet. Through the internet, Hanzō learns of a rumor that paranormal activity in the form of portal activations to Ente Isla occur in an abandoned classroom at a local high school which turns out to be Chiho's school. Sadao and Shirō decide to investigate in the hopes of harvesting magic power from the portal. That night, along with Chiho, the group goes into the school but are followed by Emi who claims she has to keep an eye on Sadao, despite she being able to return to Ente Isla at any time, although Sadao and co. try and fail to abandon Emi which results her accidentally destroying a science model. Eventually the group reaches the abandoned classroom, it turns out that had been the base of operations for both Hanzō and Olba prior to their respective betrayals and alliance. Hanzō then asks that Sadao to retrieve his PSVita game console while he is there, which he had left by accident. This angers the group although Hanzō claims that he merely neglected to tell them that he had lived there. Later, while the group is outside, the same girl who made the report to the Church of Ente Isla is seen through the classroom window, indicating she had opened a portal. Later, a new tenant moves into Sadao's apartment building and Sadao catches her as she falls down the stairs and passes out.
7	7	"The Devil's Budget Is Saved by Neighborliness"; Transliteration: "Maō, Kinjozukiai de Kakei o Tasukerareru" (Japanese: 魔王、近所付き合いで家計を助けられる)	May 16, 2013	
Suzuno Kamazuki who had fallen down their apartment building's stairs comes to introduce herself to Sadao, Shirō and Hanzō the next morning and gives them a box of udon noodles as a friendly gesture. Elsewhere, Emi receives a box containing bottles of a sacred power boosting drink from Emeralda. As she continues to stalk Sadao's apartment, Emi spots Suzuno helping Hanzō with chores and goes to covertly investigate, although she is caught when Suzuno exits the apartment and Emi falls down the stairs while fleeing. Back in Sadao's apartment, Suzuno introduces herself to Emi and thinks that she and Sadao are in some kind of relationship because of their unreserved manner when speaking to each other, which she denies. Emi then speaks with Suzuno outside and seemingly misunderstands that Suzuno might like Sadao, prompting her to warn Suzuno not to get close to Sadao. Although Suzuno already knows who Emi is, being from Ente Isla herself (unbeknownst to Emi). As Sadao leaves for work where he is made Shift Supervisor, Suzuno gives him a handmade boxed lunch. While Emi stakes out, outside MgRonald, Emeralda calls to ask the results of the magic drink, and relays that there is peace on Ente Isla for now while rumors are being spread. Emeralda further adds that the Church is currently looking for the missing Olba, warning that people may be looking for her as well. As Sadao takes his break at MgRonald, Chiho gets jealous of the packed lunch given to him by Suzuno. Meanwhile, while buying food at a convenience store, Emilia is attacked by a masked man wielding a large scythe and using Magic which nullifies her Holy Sword in a counterattack. In the aftermath while wondering who the masked man was, Emi receives a call from Chiho, venting her jealousy over Sadao's boxed lunch.
8	8	"The Hero Enters the Fray"; Transliteration: "Yūsha, Shuraba ni Totsunyū Suru" (Japanese: 勇者、修羅場に突入する)	May 23, 2013	
Chiho and Emi visit Sadao's apartment and are surprised to find Suzuno still helping Sadao and co. with their domestic chores, much to Chiho's shock. Later, as Sadao walks Chiho home, she confesses her feelings for him while depreciating the fact that he is a demon, since she already fell for him. Just then, Suzuno overhears Chiho's confession, causing Chiho to run away in embarrassment. Suzuno follows up by asking Sadao about his own response to being loved by people and is visibly surprised by his sincere response. Afterwards Suzuno meets Emi at the Sasazuka Station and they both inadvertently reveal their misunderstood intentions towards Sadao over the events of the past few days. Afterwards Suzuno introduces herself as a resident of Ente Isla, Crestia Bell and informs Emi that she was sent under orders by the Church of Ente Isla to investigate any leads on the missing Olba Meiyā. Suzuno further asks that Emi return to Ente Isla to confront the Church about the cover-up regarding Olba's traitorous actions, after defeating Satan. Although Emi remains hesitant in trusting Suzuno since the actions of her superior put the lives of everyone in the underground mall in danger just to kill her and Sadao. Before she leaves, Emi advises Suzuno to be leery of Sadao and co. finding out her true agenda. Meanwhile, a new fast food restaurant, Sentucky Fried Chicken boldly opens up across the street from MgRonald and its manager, Mitsuki Sarue pops into MgRonald to apparently check out the competition, although Sadao counters by having Shirō do some spying of their own. Finally, Suzuno waits for Emi after work and expresses a desire to visit Sadao's workplace at MgRonald, while Rika misunderstands the interaction between Suzuno and Emi as a lover's quarrel over Sadao, much to Emi's irritation.
9	9	"The Hero Experiences a Fray"; Transliteration: "Yūsha, Shuraba o Keiken Suru" (Japanese: 勇者、修羅場を経験する)	May 30, 2013	
Rika, Emi and Suzuno make their way over to Hatagaya to discover the Tanabata Festival in full gear. Rika, still fully enthusiastic over her perceived Lover's Quarrel between Emi and Suzuno, suggests that she first learn all of the details of the "conflict" by stopping for a bit inside the newly opened Sentucky Fried Chicken. Here, as Emi frantically tries to reject Rika's notion of her and Sadao being a couple, she starts verbally insulting Sadao, but is stopped by an irritated Shirō who had been nearby doing reconnaissance on Sentucky for Sadao. After brief introductions, and a bit of chatting, Ashiya is able to clear up Rika's misunderstanding between Emi and Sadao, by using a metaphor to describe the history between them. Meanwhile, as MgRonald's business begins losing to Sentucky for the festival, Sadao struggles to decide what to do, but eventually decides to have his employees keep themselves busy until an opportune moment for business shows itself. Later, Shirō, Emi, Suzuno and Rika visit MgRonald, with Rika, having a less than favorable first impression of Sadao much to his irritation. Afterwards, Sadao tries and fails in various schemes to market MgRonald to the festival's patrons, but then comes up with an ingenious idea of having the franchise be part of the festival itself. Sadao then calls up a friend to deliver some bamboo plants for display in front of the franchise and has his staff decorate it. Finally revealing that they will allow the festival's patrons to hang wishes on the plants and offer a free drink to whoever does so, a plan which successfully gets MgRonald flooded with customers. While this is happening, Suzuno notices a strange purple aura hanging over the crowd in front of MgRonald, adding to her suspicion of Sadao.
10	10	"The Devil and the Hero Take a Break from the Daily Routine"; Transliteration: "Maō to Yūsha, Itsumo to Chigatta Nichijō o Sugosu" (Japanese: 魔王と勇者、いつもと違った日常を過ごす)	June 6, 2013	
Following the success of the previous day's business, Mayumi informs Sadao that she has selected him based on a request by the MgRonald branch at the Fushima Park to assist them with business during a fair. That night, Hanzō informs Sadao that they might be able to harvest magic off people's fear by investigating the advertised haunted house at the fair, while Suzuno eavesdrops on their conversation, which she relays to Emi as a precaution. Later, Chiho invites Emi to the fair, who also brings along Suzuno after being suspicious of Sadao and co.'s intentions. While Sadao continues being busy with his work at the park's MgRonald and impressing its manager, Chiho tries and fails to get Sadao's attention. Afterwards the girls decide to check out the rest of the fair, visiting the haunted house, which proves to be too much for them, followed by the reptile exhibit where both Emi and Chiho reveal their fear of reptiles although Suzuno remarks on having eaten them before as a delicacy in the southern part of Ente Isla, before she is stopped by Emi. While exploring the exhibit, Emi bumps into a maintenance worker causing him to drop his keys. These keys are subsequently picked up by an escaped circus monkey, humorously called "Sadao" much to Sadao's irritation. Before being found it is revealed that the monkey had unlocked the crocodile exhibit. This allows the beasts to escape and sneak into the water park. As the crowd erupts into a panic Emi, Chiho and a stunned Suzuno watch as Satan absorbs their fear and chants a spell to calm the beasts, thus saving the fair and leaving Suzuno to echo Emi's previous thoughts of why he would save the humans. Afterwards, as the girls head home, Suzuno feels the presence of a white-winged being watching her which disappears when she turns to look.
11	11	"The Hero Stays True to Her Convictions"; Transliteration: "Yūsha, Onore no Shinnen o Tsuranuku" (Japanese: 勇者、己の信念を貫く)	June 13, 2013	
Shirō continues to suffer from his illness while Miki sends boxes of merchandise she imported from Hawaii for Sadao and co. to sell at a bazaar in the shopping district. Meanwhile, Suzuno has a flashback which shows her job as an executioner of the Church to kill members of the rebelling Allied Knight Order. Eventually Chiho and Emi show up at Sadao's apartment building and along with Suzuno, help him move all of the merchandise over to the shopping district before he leaves for his shift at MgRonald. Here, Suzuno leaves the group and has a meeting with a hooded person involving her mission to kill Sadao to which she shows hesitation. Another flashback shows her eavesdropping on the Church's leaders during a meeting on Ente Isla where they conspire to use inconspicuous means to kill their enemies, to which Crestia laments that she didn't want to kill anyone. Back in the present, Suzuno reveals her true nature to Chiho and tries to justify her intentions of killing Sadao. Chiho, brought to tears, vehemently defends Sadao because of his kindness. Emi interjects and remains against killing Sadao instead, striving to fight for a world where everyone can live in peace, a statement which visibly enrages Suzuno who abruptly walks off. While Emi and Chiho walk home and ponder what happened, they are attacked by the masked man with the scythe from before, who reveals himself to be a fallen angel Sariel before managing to overwhelm Emilia in battle. Chiho tries to call Sadao, but is knocked unconscious by Crestia. At the same time, Sadao learns from Chiho's mother that Chiho didn't arrive home and has Hanzō track Emi's location via GPS but instead finds Suzuno moving rapidly towards the City Hall. Also learning that Mitsuki Sarue's identity is a forgery, Sadao hurriedly heads to the City Hall to rescue Chiho while Olba regains consciousness in the hospital.
12	12	"The Devil Carries Out His Duties"; Transliteration: "Maō, Onore no Shokuseki o Hatasu" (Japanese: 魔王、己の職責を果たす)	June 20, 2013	
Shirō steps out of his hospital room for a bit and notices an unconscious police officer. While investigating, he is violently punched into submission by the newly awakened Olba, who learns of Sadao's residence from Shirō's insurance card. Atop City Hall, Sariel sadistically begins torturing Emilia in order to obtain the Better Half, although it refuses to manifest in his presence. Meanwhile, Satan arrives and destroys Sariel's barrier using his remaining magic. At that moment, Crestia attacks him with a magical mallet and is surprised to learn that Satan and his fellow demons had known about her since she first moved into the Villa Rosa. Not having any magic, Satan takes a beating from Crestia but gets up nonetheless to rescue Chiho from Sariel, leaving Crestia to realize that unlike Satan, she had abandoned her friends. At the same time, Olba visits Lucifer and seeks to reestablish their contract. As Sariel begins to reveal a perverted nature, Emilia claims that Satan will show up to save Chiho because of his natural instinct to protect his coworkers, which is mocked by Sariel. Much to Chiho and Emilia's relief Satan does arrive but is easily overwhelmed by Sariel due to his lack of magic. Elsewhere, Olba replenishes his magic with Emilia's drink and casts a spell which enlarges the Moon, which increases Sariel's magic while subsequently throwing the city into mass panic. The panic grants Satan an enormous magical boost but Sariel remains confident in his power, even as Crestia decides to side with Satan. Elsewhere, Lucifer knocks Olba out, cancelling the Moon spell, after deceiving him into throwing the city into panic for Satan's advantage. Finally Satan and Sariel engage in an epic aerial battle which destroys half of the city and ultimately ends with Sariel's defeat to Satan's demon sword.
13	13	"The Devil and the Hero Do Some Honest Hard Work"; Transliteration: "Maō to Yūsha, Mattō ni Shigoto ni Hagemu" (Japanese: 魔王と勇者、真っ当に仕事に励む)	June 27, 2013	
Chiho has a strange dream where Satan leaves Earth and returns to Ente Isla, leaving her behind much to her agony. While recalling the dream to Sadao the next day he confirms that he doesn't have enough magic to return since he used it all repairing the city from his and Sariel's battle the previous day. At the same time, they discover Sariel in MgRonald's freezer since Sadao's magical bamboo had redirected his portal. Sariel immediately falls head over heels for Mayumi much to her disgust. Meanwhile, Emi also has a strange dream where Satan conquers Sasakuza. As she goes to visit Sadao and co. Shirō asks Sadao for some time off which makes her suspicious, causing her to enlist Emeralda to see what they might be up to. Later, Emi notices numerous boxes being delivered to Sadao's apartment and grows even more suspicious. At work, Sadao suddenly asks Mayumi for a shift change which causes Chiho to fear that he might return to Ente Isla, but Sadao apologetically keeps their motives hidden from her. Chiho and Emi decide to follow Sadao the next day to find out what they have been up to and discover that he along with Shirō had taken extra jobs to pay for Hanzo's GPS trackers which had saved them from Sariel. As Emi questions Sadao on the boxes, they return to the Villa Rosa to discover that Hanzo had been caught in a purchasing scam whereby he was tricked into buying useless items. Sadao and Emi head over to the retailer to claim a refund, and discover that Shirō had been working there, along with a threatening manager who refuses a refund due to a contract Hanzo had signed. Emi is able to solve the situation via a cooling-off period. Eventually Shirō and Sadao celebrate their success by going out to a restaurant, while everyone goes back to living normally in the human world. In the epilogue, Sadao is forced to walk home through the rain after work. While waiting at the crosswalk, Emi approaches and gives him a new umbrella as a replacement for the one he had lent her. Sadao thanks her and she welcomes him with a smile.

== Home media ==
Pony Canyon began releasing the series in Japan on Blu-ray and DVD volumes starting on July 3, 2013. The complete series was released on Blu-ray and DVD format by Funimation on July 22, 2014, Siren Visual on September 17, 2014 and Manga Entertainment on October 27, 2014. These releases contained English and Japanese audio options and English subtitles.

Pony Canyon (Region 2 - Japan)
Vol.	Episodes	Blu-ray / DVD artwork	Notable bonus material	Release date	Ref.
1	1, 2	Sadao, Emi and Chiho	Light Novel Volume 5.5	July 3, 2013	
2	3, 4	Sadao, Chiho and Shiro	Drama CD	August 7, 2013	
3	5, 6	Olba, Hanzo and Emilia	—	September 4, 2013	
4	7, 8	Suzuno and Sadao	—	October 16, 2013	
5	9, 10	Emi and Chiho	—	November 6, 2013	
6	11, 12, 13	All main characters	Light Novel Volume 2.8	December 4, 2013	

Funimation (Region 1 - North America)
Vol.	Episodes	BD / DVD artwork	BD / DVD Release date	Ref.
1	1-13	Sadao, Alciel & Lucifer	July 22, 2014	

Siren Visual (Region 4 - Australia / New Zealand)
Vol.	Episodes	DVD artwork	BD / DVD Release date	BD Ref.	DVD Ref.
1	1-13	Sadao, Emi & Chiho	September 17, 2014		

Manga Entertainment (Region 2 - United Kingdom)
Vol.	Episodes	Blu-ray / DVD artwork	BD / DVD Release date	BD Ref.	DVD Ref.
1	1-13	Sadao, Alciel & Lucifer	October 27, 2014		
