= The Devil Is a Part-Timer! season 2 =

2013 Japanese anime series Season 2

The Devil Is a Part-Timer!!
- Season 2
- No. of episodes: 24

Release
- Original network: Tokyo MX, BS11
- Original release: July 14, 2022 – September 28, 2023

Season chronology
- ← Previous; Season 1

The Devil Is a Part-Timer! is a Japanese anime television series based on the light novels of the same name written by Satoshi Wagahara. A second season was announced at Kadokawa's Light Novel Expo on March 6, 2021, with the main cast reprising their roles. The second season, titled The Devil Is a Part-Timer!!, is animated by 3Hz, with Daisuke Chikushi directing, Ydai Iino designing the characters, Yoshihiro Takeda serving as chief animation director and the rest of the staff returning from the first season. The second season premiered between July 14 and September 29, 2022, on Tokyo MX and BS11 and simultaneously released on Disney+'s Star content hub in Japan. The opening theme is "With" by Minami Kuribayashi, while the ending theme is "Mizukagami no Sekai" (水鏡の世界; lit. 'The World in the Water's Reflection') by Marina Horiuchi.

A sequel was announced following the conclusion of the second season. It was later confirmed to be the second part of Season 2, which aired from July 13 to September 28, 2023. (Note: The second part is formally considered the "second season" of season 2 in Japan, as the actual second season is treated as a sequel series to the first in promotional material.) The opening theme is "Hikari no Nai Machi" (光のない街; lit. "Town Without Light") performed by nano.RIPE, while the ending theme is "Bloomin" performed by Liyuu.

== Episode list ==
No. overall	No. in season	Title	Original release date
Part 1
14	1	"The Devil Screams in Sasazuka"; Transliteration: "Maō, Sasazuka ni Sakebu" (Japanese: 魔王、笹塚に叫ぶ)	July 14, 2022
In the demon realm, a mysterious woman enters the abandoned Devil King's castle, and sends the lone remaining plant to Earth. Meanwhile, Maou, Alciel, and Urushihara get into one of their usual arguments, with Emi mocking their poorness while visiting Suzuno. After Maou goes to his shift at MgRonald's, Alciel attempts to teach Urushihara how to clean up the house, where they sense a weird presence nearby, which later starts to attack them. After their shift, Chiho wants to visit Maou's place, which he reluctantly agrees after it starts raining and they share an umbrella. The "thing" is revealed to be a cockroach, which freaks everyone out until Suzuno disposes of it. Suddenly, a gate opens up above the building, with a large apple emerging from it. Maou and Emi get into an argument, leading Emi to attack him with her Holy Sword, only for hands to emerge from the apple to stop it. The apple transforms into a young girl which they take inside. She tells them her name is Alas Ramus, and when asked who her papa and mama are, she points at Maou and Emi, completely throwing everyone into shock.
15	2	"The Devil and the Hero Inconceivably Become Parents"; Transliteration: "Maō to Yūsha, Mi ni Oboenaku Oya ni Naru" (Japanese: 魔王と勇者、身に覚えなく親になる)	July 21, 2022
After the revelation, the group try to figure out what to do about Alas Ramus, theorizing she isn't directly connected to the angels, due to her having an Ente Islan name. Maou agrees to let her stay at their place and take care of her. Later, Chiho buys baby supplies for Alas Ramus to help make herself useful, still partially anxious over not yet receiving an answer from Maou after her confession. Emi talks to Suzuki about the situation between her, Maou, and Alas Ramus, so she's given tickets to the amusement park Tokyo Big-Egg Town to go together. Chiho and Suzuno take Alas Ramus to see Maou at work, causing a slight scandal due to a misunderstanding. The manager, Kisaki, speaks with Maou and Chiho, telling them to be more careful regarding their appearances. Maou thanks Chiho for her help, while apologizing he can't give an answer yet to her confession, which she is okay with. Kisaki gives Maou tickets to Tokyo Big-Egg Town, giving the group a total of 6. Emi reluctantly agrees to go to the park with Maou and Alas Ramus at the girl's insistence. On the day of the trip, Alciel, Chiho, and Suzuki decide to secretly follow the three on their "date". Elsewhere, an angel with the intention of restoring the "Tree of Life" enters through a gate with his army, which Urushihara senses.
16	3	"The Devil and the Hero Go to the Amusement Park as Advised"; Transliteration: "Maō to Yūsha, Susume ni Shitagai Yuenchi ni Iku" (Japanese: 魔王と勇者、勧めに従い遊園地に行く)	July 28, 2022
At the amusement park, Emi questions Maou's intentions regarding Alas Ramus and his remaining troops in the demon realm, receiving a vague answer that confuses her. When watching a hero show, a crescent on Alas Ramus' forehead suddenly re-appears, forcing them to leave. After Maou steps away, the mysterious white-haired woman appears, and using a ring helps remove the pain from Alas Ramus. Emi is skeptical of her, but she claims to be an ally, and tells her to be wary of "Gabriel", before disappearing when Maou returns. Emi takes him onto the ferris wheel to confront him about the truth behind Alas Ramus. He reveals that the white-haired woman is actually an angel who saved him from death due to being the first demon she's ever seen cry, telling him about the human realm and giving him a crescent shaped seed to take care of; this seed being planted and grown into Alas Ramus. He further realizes that Alas Ramus is a reincarnation of "Yesod", a fragment of the Tree of Life. Meanwhile, Suzuki, Alciel, and Chiho get separated from tailing the three, with the former two ending up on the ferris wheel themselves, flustering Suzuki. Maou and Emi get a call from Suzuno and Urushihara, having been captured by Gabriel and his army of angels, intending to take back Alas Ramus and Emi's Holy Sword. Gabriel decimates Maou with his power until he's stopped by Chiho, who tearfully begs him to be spared. Gabriel reluctantly gives them until tomorrow when they'll return. Figuring out what to do, Maou states his insistence on fighting back somehow, telling Emi to stay at their place for the night.
17	4	"The Devil Learns the Pain of Losing Something Precious"; Transliteration: "Maō, Taisetsu na Mono o Ushinau Kurushimi o Shiru" (Japanese: 魔王、大切なものを失う苦しみを知る)	August 4, 2022
After Suzuno explains to the group the Yesod's role in the Tree of Life, and the angels' belief that its disappearance will result in a catastrophe, Emi agrees to stay the night with Maou and Alas Ramus. To get her to sleep, Maou tells Alas Ramus a bedtime story in the form of a loose re-telling of his backstory; Emi tries to use this to question Maou's decision to invade Ente Isla, but he brushes it off. The next morning, Emi wakes up to find Gabriel waiting, still intending to take Alas Ramus and her sword, revealing it contains a Yesod fragment. Maou begs Gabriel to let her stay, causing him to retaliate. Alas Ramus defends Maou, calling all the gods "liars", and proceeding to power herself up and attack Gabriel in the sky, with Emi following suit. In the scuffle, Emi's sword is broken by Gabriel's sword. Maou arrives to try and help, just as Alas Ramus asks Emi if she will always be with Maou, which she says she will. Alas Ramus saves Maou from falling to his death, before seemingly disappearing in the sky. Emi transforms, overpowering Gabriel enough to force him to reluctantly retreat. She returns to the group, with everyone believing Alas Ramus was taken away. However, Emi reveals to Chiho that during the battle, Alas Ramus fused with her Holy Sword, causing her to become intrinsically linked to her, and deceived Maou to make him understand the pain of losing something important. Upon seeing how devastated he is by her disappearance, Emi returns her to him, which he is overjoyed by. Later, Gabriel vents with Sariel about his failure, as the latter tells him they should investigate the one who stole the Yesod to begin with, Lailah, Emilia's mother.
18	5	"The Devil Is at Sea After Losing His Home and His Job"; Transliteration: "Maō, Ie mo Shigoto mo Ushinai Tohōnikureru" (Japanese: 魔王、家も仕事も失い途方に暮れる)	August 11, 2022
Maou is hit with the sudden reveal of a temporary suspension of his job at MgRonald's due to renovations, as well as needing to move out of their apartment for repairs. Maou, accompanied by Emi, visits Chiho's house to watch a video tape sent by his landlord, Shiba, who informs him her niece is looking for workers for a beach hut in Chōshi with pay plus room and board; Maou calls her to accept. After seeing how much Chiho wants to join and help them, her mom agrees to let her under certain circumstances. Later, Maou and Chiho encounter Sariel, who reveals he turned down Gabriel's proposition to work with him and that he's aware of the sacred sword's location. Chiho then talks to Maou about how she wants to become stronger so that she can support him as both Maou and the Devil King, as well as make it so everyone can be happy together. She decides to join Emi, Suzuno, and Alas Ramus on the trip to Chōshi, with the girls intending to help/keep watch over the boys. They meet Amane Ohguro, who introduces them to the dishevelled beach hut they have to run. Maou takes charge and works to renovate it to make it more appealing. Later that night, the group sees shining lights on the horizon, leading Amane to discuss a legend about the "Mouren Yassa", where ghosts appear to sink more ships to join them. Suddenly, a foreboding fog appears, forcing everyone inside, causing Amane to feel uneasy, while a large figure begins to emerge from it.
19	6	"The Hero Helps the Devil Reequip His Workplace"; Transliteration: "Yūsha, Maō no Shokuba no Dai Kaizō ni Kyōryoku Suru" (Japanese: 勇者、魔王の職場の大改造に協力する)	August 18, 2022
As the fog begins to pick up, Amane leaves to take the girls to their inn while the boys head to their room. They start to hear noises and shadowy figures outside, discovering them to be a cyclops and minotaur. Before they can learn more the two demons are swallowed up a tornado. Another demon then appears, who Maou recognizes as Camio, the general he left in charge of his forces in the demon realm when he invaded Ente Isla. They take him inside before he too can be attacked by the tornado and begins to recover from his injury, transforming into a small bird. The next day, the boys get to work at running the beach hut with Amane. They start to fall under the pressure of the workload, but the girls show up to help leviate their stress. During a break, Urushihara asks Emi about Olba, who was arrested by the Japanese police after their previous battle, but they believe won't stop him from returning. He goes on to explain how he joined with him on the promise that he could help get him back up to Heaven, and provides his theory that he was aware Emi's Holy Sword contained a Yesod fragment so that he could eventually use her as a bargaining chip for Heaven. Maou introduces Emi and Chiho to Camio to learn about what he is doing in Japan. After Amane quickly pops in to check on them, Camio reveals that she was the one who attacked him and the other demons the previous night, and possesses a power greater than any human he's seen.
20	7	"The Devil Learns That Choshi (and the World) Are Bigger than He Knew"; Transliteration: "Maō, Chōshi to Sekai no Hiro-sa o Shiru" (Japanese: 魔王、銚子と世界の広さを知る)	August 25, 2022
Later that night, Emi meets up with Maou and his group at the lighthouse to explain everything she learned from Camio. They reveal that Olba travelled to the demon realm and spurred discourse among the demons by informing them of the sacred sword in Tokyo, and how it will allow them to rule over all, giving them a Yesod fragment to help track it down; these hardliners being led by a demon known as Barbariccia. Emi also reveals that a group of hardliners is about to show up at their location, and adds they chose to keep it a secret from Amane due to her unknown immense power, and their intention to resolve things without killing. The hardliners, demons known as the Malebranche, led by Ciriotta, arrive through a gate and Emi goes to fight them. Amane then appears to hand Maou his sword, putting her trust in them to get the job done. Emi confronts Ciriotta, struggling while holding back against them, until a fully powered Maou appears to put the demons in their place. He commands the army to return to the demon realm, claiming to have the sacred sword already in his possession, and that he is building power until his return. Amane uses the lighthouse to send the demons and Camio back to the demon realm, and Maou and Emi use their remaining strength to close the Gate, washing up on the shore soon after. The next morning, Amane relieves the group of their job, as they discover the beach is actually a safe spot for souls to recover and their presence has caused them to start to lose their human shape. After revealing herself to be the daughter of Earth's "Binah", she tells them to find and restore the "Daath" of their world, and with a snap, she and the beach hut vanish, leaving behind everyone's payslips and a tourbook. As the group sightsee around Chōshi, Maou marvels at human's ingenuity and how he wants to rule over them too. He gives Emi the Yesod fragment from his sword and declares his intention to conquer everyone, leading to a freak-out from Emi and Chiho.
21	8	"The Devil Begins Farming"; Transliteration: "Maō, Shūnō Suru" (Japanese: 魔王、就農する)	September 1, 2022
Chiho learns that due to an incident at her family's farm, they need workers for the summer harvest, so she invites Maou, Alciel, and Urushihara to join them to work. They arrive at the Sasaki's family farm in Nagano with Chiho and her mom where they meet Chiho's grandmother, her aunt and uncle, her cousin, his wife, and their child. The three are also overblown to discover the amount of land the family owns, as well as how big their house is. After working them for the day, they are taken to a nearby hot springs to clean-up when they suddenly run into Emi, Suzuno, and Alas Ramus. The girls come up with an explanation for Alas Ramus and why they are there, before Emi offers up her services to work on the farm, to Maou and Chiho's shock. Later that night, a flustered Chiho takes Maou outside to talk, where she tells him that Emi is there because of her mixed feelings about Maou working on a farm, due to their history, and reiterating her dream that they can all be happy together someday. As harvest time starts, Emi wakes the boys up to work, with her and Maou paired up to pick eggplants. After explaining the farming process, she states her personal feelings about Maou working on the farm and not intending to forgive or accept his regret for his actions, but still encourages him to work for the Sasaki's sake. After being relieved, Maou and Alciel make themselves useful by taking the child, Hitoshi, to see his mom, however they are all startled by the appearance of a growling black bear, which soon notices them after Hitoshi starts to cry.
22	9	"The Devil and the Hero Rise Up to Defend the Sasakis"; Transliteration: "Maō to Yūsha, Sasaki-ke o Mamoru Tame ni Tachiagaru" (Japanese: 魔王と勇者、佐々木家を守るために立ち上がる)	September 8, 2022
Maou and Emi prepare to distract the bear to let the others escape, however an incoming SUV spooks the bear into charging, forcing Emi to use her strength to take it down. The news quickly spreads around town about the "bear-slayer", incredibly embarrassing Emi and forcing her to hide inside. After Maou and Alciel return from working the fields, they learn from the neighbours that there have been frequent attacks on the nearby farms by thieves stealing the livestock. The group determine that the Sasaki farm will be the next target, and realizing the SUV that scared the bear earlier was also them, plan for some way to catch them. Chiho's grandmother overhears their conversation, but tells them she has no intention to pry into their secrets, and gives them information on the farm's geography, leading them to figure out they will be targeting the family's solar panels. The thieves show up as expected, and Alciel stops them from stealing the panel, taking out one of them as the others escape in their car, which Emi and Suzuno soon halt. One of them manages to make a getaway, but is cornered by Maou, who after transforming into his demon form, berates him for his actions and that he will spend the rest of his time paying for his mistakes, just like he has. After returning home, the group receives boxes of vegetables as an added bonus and thanks, as well as learn the fate of the thieves on the news. Elsewhere, Emi receives a call from Emeralda asking if she's made contact with Lailah, which shocks Emi upon hearing she's her mother.
23	10	"The Devil Adamantly Insists on Buying a TV"; Transliteration: "Maō, Terebi Kōnyū o Kyōkō ni Shuchō Suru" (Japanese: 魔王、テレビ購入を強硬に主張する)	September 15, 2022
Maou argues with Alciel about wanting to get a television in their room, for both personal and practical reasons, and is able to convince him after haggling down the price to an appropriate amount. That night, Emi and Suzuno discuss their worries about what would happen if the Devil King's army returns to force Maou back to the demon realm. She then receives a call from Suzuki, revealing that Alciel invited her to accompany them on their TV quest, absolutely baffling her. The stress over the two of them going out on a "date" distracts Emi enough for her to be relieved at her job for the day, so decides to use the time to investigate the Yesod fragment. Meanwhile, Gabriel, who has since been living in a manga cafe relieved from Yesod duty, visits Urushihara while he's home alone, questioning him about his decision to remain a NEET with Maou. He asks about Devil King Satan's "treasures", and after receiving enough information, warns Urushihara that another angel has arrived to cause trouble. While thinking about the Yesod fragments, Emi remembers back to her conversation with Emerealda about Lailah, her supposed mother, distressing her due to never having met her before. She also learns that a war is about to erupt in Ente Isla, but can't return lest the Hero disrupt things further. Later after returning home from school, Chiho turns on her television, where a giant flash of light suddenly appears, causing her to pass out.
24	11	"The Devil Preaches Human Interaction"; Transliteration: "Maō, Hito to no Kakawari o Toku" (Japanese: 魔王、人との関わりを説く)	September 22, 2022
Suzuki takes Alciel, Maou, and Suzuno to a udon shop to discuss what are the best TVs to look for, due to all of their inexperiences with modern technology. Before leaving, Maou stops an altercation with a supposed American tourist causing a scene in the shop. Meanwhile, Emi follows the Yesod trail which takes her to the hospital, where she encounters Chiho's mom, discovering Chiho to be in a coma. While purchasing the TVs, Maou is able to deduce that Suzuki has a crush on Alciel, and discusses this with Suzuno. She warns Maou that it would bad for her due to their secrets, with him suggesting telling her the truth and letting her decide. All the TVs in the store suddenly explode just as Emi calls the group to reveal Chiho's comatose state due to magic poisoning, as a result of being exposed to a celestial sonar. Suzuno also figures out that the sonar has resulted in turning Chiho's life force into magical energy. When another sonar goes off, an arriving Urushihara reveals it to be the cause of "Raguel the Watcher", an angel who judges other angels and has been using the TV broadcasts to send out the sonar. They also realize Chiho was effected due to having already been caught in the middle of a sonar pulse previously. Emi deduces that the angels' main goal is tracking down Lailah, and Maou decides to find and defeat Raguel as revenge for Chiho getting hurt. At this time, Lailah disguised as a nurse visits Chiho, putting her ring on her finger, saying she can become the mother of the next Daath.
25	12	"The Devil and The Hero Focuses on Whats happening Right Now"; Transliteration: "Maō to Yūsha, Toriaezu Me no Mae no Dekigoto ni Shūchū Suru" (Japanese: 魔王と勇者、とりあえず目の前の出来事に集中する)	September 29, 2022
Deducing that Raguel is sending out the sonar pulses through one of the two TV satellites, the group splits up with Emi checking out one while Maou and Alciel investigate the other, with Suzuno and Urushihara standing by as back-up. Later that night, Emi discovers Gabriel also waiting on her tower, leading to a quick confrontation. She asks what the angels want with her mother, leading him to explain that Emi being the child of an angel and human proves that angels are more human than not, which they believe will disrupt the natural order of Heaven. He also further reveals that her father, Nord Justina, is actually alive and on Earth, shocking her. Meanwhile, Chiho wakes up from her coma, empowered by the ring given to her by Lailah, and is guided by the woman toward the towers. While Suzuno fights off the Heavenly Regiment, Chiho uses her powers to shoot an arrow into the sky, creating an aurora of magic that envelops the area. Maou and Alciel discover that Raguel is the "American tourist" he met earlier, and thanks to the magic regains his full strength, ready to fight him. Gabriel shows up, telling him what he just revealed to Emi, and holds them off while Raguel tries to escape. Meanwhile a distressed Emi, unsure of her reasoning for fighting anymore if her father is still alive, regains her drive thanks to Alas Ramus, and rejoins the fight against the two angels. Chiho appears and manages to knock Raguel out, leading Gabriel to retreat. Chiho proceeds to use her remaining magic to restore the magical balance of the world, after Emi attempts to speak with her mother through her. The next day, Maou visits Chiho in the hospital, learning that she's since inherited some of Lailah's memories of Maou as a child, right as a premade message from Lailah possesses her body via the ring to speak to Maou. She tells him her intention to restore Ente Isla, Heaven, and the demon realm to how it should be, and entrusts him and Emi to find the Daath on Earth. Maou returns back to the apartment as everyone watches TV, contemplating his future.
Part 2
25.5	12.5	"Recap Special: From Sasazuka to Ente Isla!"; Transliteration: "SP Sasazuka～Ente・Isura e！" (Japanese: SP 笹塚～エンテ・イスラへ！)	July 6, 2023
Recap of the first part of season 2.
26	13	"The Devil Returns to the Workplace"; Transliteration: "Maō, Shokuba ni Fukki Suru" (Japanese: 魔王、職場に復帰する)	July 13, 2023
27	14	"The Devil and the Hero Question Their Daily Routine"; Transliteration: "Maō to Yūsha, Nichijō ni Madō" (Japanese: 魔王と勇者、日常に惑う)	July 20, 2023
28	15	"The Devil and the Hero Take the First Steps toward a New Dream"; Transliteration: "Maō to Yūsha, Aratana Yume no Ichi ho o Fumidasu" (Japanese: 魔王と勇者、新たな夢の一歩を踏み出す)	July 27, 2023
29	16	"The Devil and the Hero Go Futon Shopping"; Transliteration: "Maō to Yūsha, wo Futon wo Kai ni" (Japanese: 魔王と勇者、お布団を買いに)	August 3, 2023
30	17	"The Hero Says Good-Bye for a Time"; Transliteration: "Yūsha, Shibashi no Itomagoi wo Suru" (Japanese: 勇者、しばしの暇乞いをする)	August 10, 2023
31	18	"The Devil Gets Off to a Late Start"; Transliteration: "Maō, Deokureru" (Japanese: 魔王、出遅れる)	August 17, 2023
32	19	"The Hero Weeps"; Transliteration: "Yūsha, Naku" (Japanese: 勇者、泣く)	August 24, 2023
33	20	"The Hero Questions Her Hometown"; Transliteration: "Yūsha, Kokyō ni Madō" (Japanese: 勇者、故郷に惑う)	August 31, 2023
34	21	"The Devil Vomits"; Transliteration: "Maō, Haku" (Japanese: 魔王、吐く)	September 7, 2023
35	22	"The Devil Loses His Standing"; Transliteration: "Maō, Tachiba o Ushinau" (Japanese: 魔王、立場を失う)	September 14, 2023
36	23	"The Hero Dances on the Battlefield"; Transliteration: "Yūsha, Senjin ni Odoru" (Japanese: 勇者、戦陣に踊る)	September 21, 2023
37	24	"The Devil and the Hero Witness Change in Ente Isla"; Transliteration: "Maō to Yūsha, Ente Isura no Henkaku ni Tachiau" (Japanese: 魔王と勇者、エンテ・イスラの変革に立ち会う)	September 28, 2023
