= UPS Capital =

Financial services division of UPS

- Company type: Division
- Founded: 1998
- Headquarters: Atlanta, Georgia
- Number of locations: Over 21 locations worldwide
- Parent: United Parcel Service Inc
- Website: upscapital.com

UPS Capital is a financial services division of UPS that offers traditional and non-traditional financial services and insurance products.

== History ==
UPS Capital was created in 1998 as a financial services division within UPS.

UPS Capital at first leveraged an existing UPS product, collect on delivery (C.O.D.), as its core service offering, but the traditional C.O.D. model was improved with financial benefits designed to help accelerate and secure the flow of funds between UPS shippers and their customers. The success of these enhancements led to other financial products and services, including asset-based lending (ABL), equipment leasing, domestic and international factoring, a UPS Capital-branded credit card for small businesses and employees, and electronic bill presentment and payment, which still serve UPS customers today.

Also at this time, UPS Capital began opening offices in the United Kingdom, Taiwan, Hong Kong, and Norway to build an international network that supports customers’ trade finance needs.

== CEO ==
UPS Capital's President is Archita Prasad.

== Headquarters ==
UPS Capital is headquartered in Atlanta, Georgia.

=== Company Services ===
UPS Capital serves the following industries as of June 2017:

- Automotive
- Healthcare
- High Tech
- Industrial Manufacturing
- Professional Services
- Retail
- Cargo Insurance
- Economy

== Office Locations ==
These are UPS Capital's office locations.

- Austria
- Belgium
- Brazil
- Canada
- China
- France
- Germany
- Italy
- Japan
- Korea
- Malaysia
- Mexico
- Netherlands
- Singapore
- Spain
- Switzerland
- Taiwan
- Thailand
- United Kingdom
- United States
- Vietnam

== See also ==
- Shipping insurance

== Official Website ==
- UPS Capital website
