= Curb mining =

Salvaging objects discarded on the street

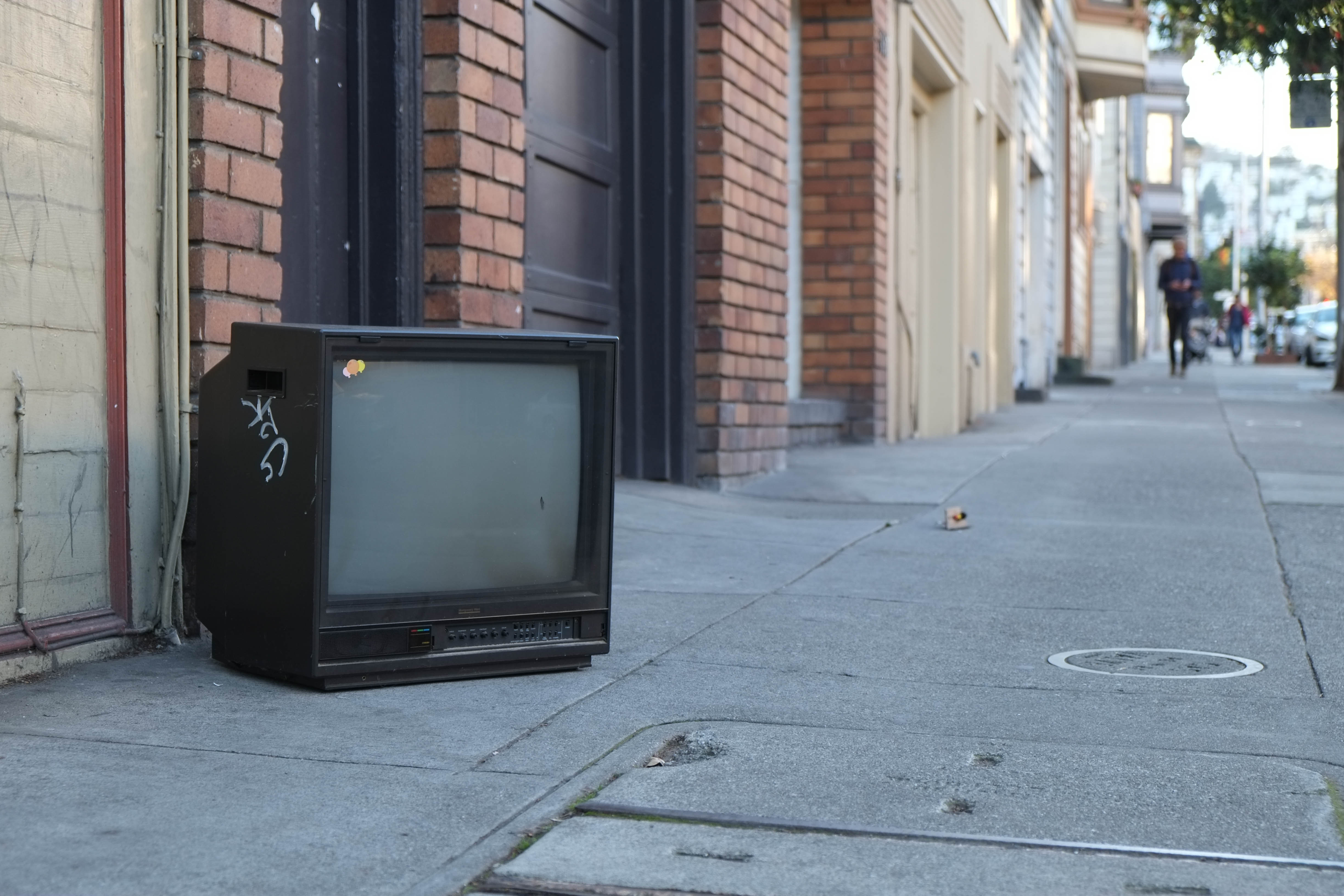
A television set discarded on a sidewalk

Curb mining is the act of salvaging appliances, electronics, furniture and art discarded on the street ("curbside"). In cities around the world, people often dispose of furniture and other unwanted items by leaving them on the sidewalk for others to take.

== Description ==
Curb mining is the act of salvaging appliances, electronics, furniture and art discarded on the street ("curbside"). In cities around the world, people often dispose of furniture and other unwanted items by leaving them on the sidewalk for others to take.

== Terminology ==
Terms similar to curb mining include "dumpster diving" and "freeganism". In June 2007, The New York Times wrote:

"Freegans" are scavengers of the developed world, living off consumer waste in an effort to minimize their support of corporations and their impact on the planet, and to distance themselves from what they see as out-of-control consumerism. They forage through supermarket trash and eat the slightly-bruised produce or just-expired canned goods that are routinely thrown out, and negotiate gifts of surplus food from sympathetic stores and restaurants. They dress in castoff clothes and furnish their homes with items found on the street.

— Steven Kurutz,

== Re-use and recycling ==
In many jurisdictions, ownership of domestic waste changes once it is placed into a container for collection. It is thus illegal (although rarely enforced) to skip dive. Curb mining gets round this because the items offered are not yet placed (in a legal sense) into the "waste" stream, thus their ownership has not yet been transferred. It is often legal to curb mine, but illegal to skip dive.

Some countries—notably Germany, Japan, and much of Western mainland Europe—have a long tradition that items placed outside are intended specifically for re-use by others. There may be a designated day of the week or month, distinct from normal refuse collections, to encourage this.

== Marketing ==
The urban phenomenon of curb mining has been used by various companies for experimental marketing. The strategy is to create awareness of a product by handing it out for free. In 2009, advertising agency Mono and modern furniture designer Blu Dot created an experiment to see what would happen if they left 25 Blu Dot chairs on the street for "curb miners" to find. They attached GPS devices to the chairs, which were activated once the chairs were picked up and taken. The chairs were then tracked back to the new owners' homes where a handful of them were interviewed for a documentary.
