= Dive! (film) =

- Directed by: Jeremy Seifert
- Produced by: Jeremy Seifert
- Cinematography: Jeremy Seifert
- Edited by: Jeremy Seifert
- Music by: Timothy Vatterott
- Release date: February 5, 2010 (Oxford)
- Running time: 42 minutes
- Country: United States
- Language: English

Dive! is an American documentary film directed by Jeremy Seifert.

== Premise ==
The film follows director Jeremy Seifert and his friends as they dumpster dive behind several grocery stores in the Los Angeles area to demonstrate the massive amount of food that is wasted each year in America. After showing that much of the food found in dumpsters is perfectly edible, Seifert confronts the managers of the stores to question why they don't donate more of it to local food banks, especially in light of the 1996 Federal Bill Emerson Good Samaritan Food Donation Act, which protects them from liability for such donations. The legality and ethics of dumpster diving are discussed when the stores begin locking up their dumpsters. Finally, Seifert considers the waste created by individual consumers when they throw out food that is only partly bad or just past its expiration date.

== Release ==
Dive! premiered in October 2009 at the Gig Harbor Film Festival, where it won the Audience Choice Award. It has gone on to win awards at many other film festivals, including Best Documentary at the DC Independent Film Festival and Best Film at the Dutch Environmental Film Festival.
