= Dumpster diving =

Taking items from waste piles for personal use

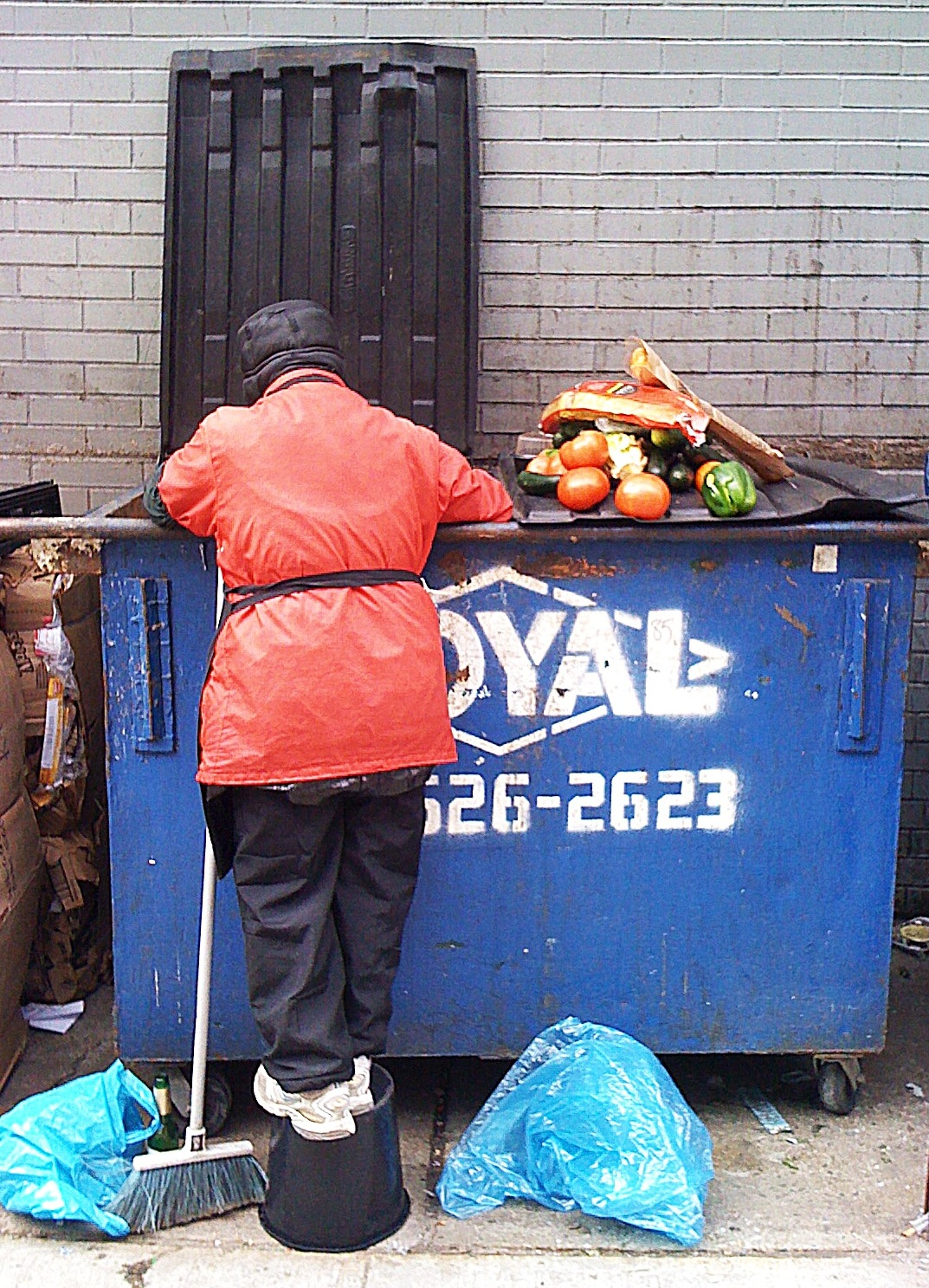
A person dumpster diving

Video of impoverished individuals "dumpster diving" at a neighborhood trash dump in Kabul

Dumpster diving (also totting, skipping, skip diving, or skip salvage) is salvaging from large commercial, residential, industrial and construction containers for unwanted items discarded by their owners but deemed useful to the picker. It is not confined to dumpsters and skips, and may cover standard household waste containers, curb sides, landfills or small dumps.

Different terms are used to refer to different forms of this activity. For picking materials from the curbside trash collection, expressions such as curb shopping, trash picking or street scavenging are sometimes used. In the UK, if someone is primarily seeking recyclable metal, they are scrapping, and if they are picking the leftover food from farming left in the fields, they are gleaning. In such instances, unpackaged and hence lower quality food waste is commonly termed scree.

People dumpster dive for clothing, furniture, food, or for various items deemed usable. Many dumpster dive out of necessity due to poverty; others might do it for ideological reasons, professionally, academically, for profit (legal and illegal), or even fun.

== Etymology ==
The term "dumpster diving" emerged in the 1980s, combining "diving" with "dumpster", a large commercial trash bin. The term "Dumpster" itself comes from the Dempster Dumpster, a brand of bins manufactured by Dempster Brothers beginning in 1937. "Dumpster" became genericized by the 1970s. According to the Oxford English Dictionary, the term "dumpster diving" is chiefly found in American English and first appeared in print in 1983, with the verb "dumpster-dive" appearing a few years later. In British English, the practice may be known as "skipping", from skip, another term for this type of container.

Alternative names for the practice include bin-diving, containering, D-mart, dumpstering, totting, and skipping. In Australia, garbage picking is called "skip dipping."

== Participants ==
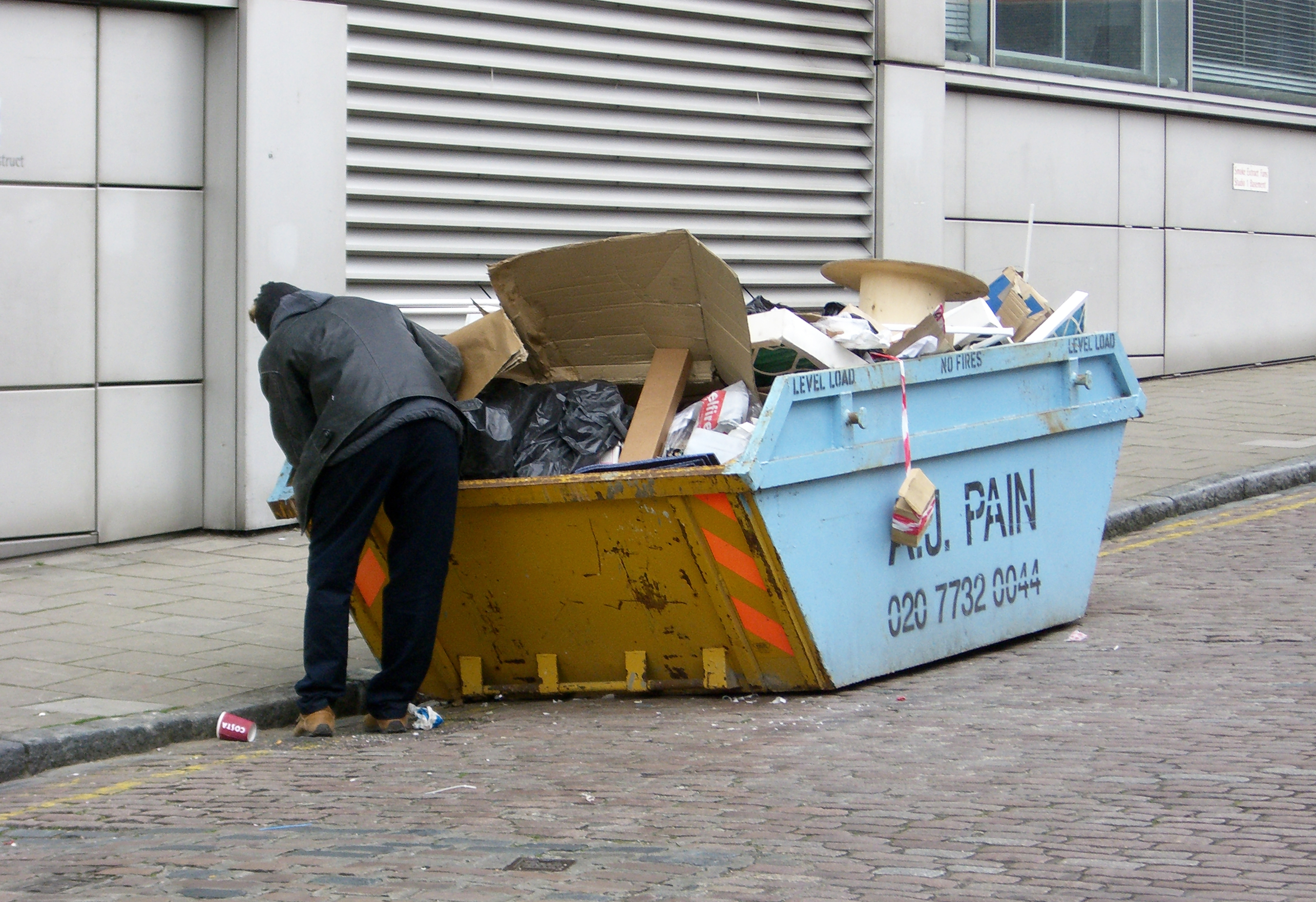
A man rummaging through a skip at the back of an office building in Central London

The term "binner" is often used to describe individuals who collect recyclable materials for their deposit value. For example, in Vancouver, British Columbia, binners, or bottle collectors, search garbage cans and dumpsters for recyclable materials that can be redeemed for their deposit value. On average, these binners earn about $40 a day for several garbage bags full of discarded containers. Some are scammers seeking receipts to use in committing return fraud.

Karung guni, Zabbaleen, the rag and bone man, waste picker, junk man or bin hoker are terms for people who make their living by sorting and trading trash. A similar process known as gleaning was practised in rural areas and some ancient agricultural societies, where the residue from farmers' fields was collected.

Some dumpster divers, who self-identify as freegans, aim to reduce their ecological footprint by living from dumpster-dived-goods, sometimes exclusively.

== Overview ==
The activity is performed by people out of necessity in the developing world. Some scavengers perform in organized groups, and some organize on various internet forums and social networking websites. By reusing, or repurposing, resources destined for the landfill, dumpster diving is sometimes considered to be an environmentalist endeavor, and is thus practiced by many pro-green communities. The wastefulness of consumer society and throw-away culture compels some individuals to rescue usable items (for example, computers or smartphones, which are frequently discarded due to the extensive use of planned obsolescence in the technology industry) from destruction and divert them to those who can make use of the items.

A wide variety of things may be disposed while still repairable or in working condition, making salvage of them a source of potentially free items for personal use, or to sell for profit. Irregular, blemished or damaged items that are still otherwise functional are regularly thrown away. Discarded food that might have slight imperfections, near its expiration date, or that is simply being replaced by newer stock is often tossed out despite being still edible. Many retailers are reluctant to sell this stock at reduced prices because of the risks that people will buy it instead of the higher-priced newer stock, that extra handling time is required, and that there are liability risks. In the United Kingdom, cookery books have been written on the cooking and consumption of such foods, which has contributed to the popularity of skipping. Artists often use discarded materials retrieved from trash receptacles to create works of found objects or assemblage.

Students have been known to partake in dumpster diving to obtain high tech items for technical projects, or simply to indulge their curiosity for unusual items. Dumpster diving can additionally be used in support of academic research. Garbage picking serves as the main tool for garbologists, who study the sociology and archeology of trash in modern life. Private and government investigators may pick through garbage to obtain information for their inquiries. Illegal cigarette consumption may be deduced from discarded packages.

Dumpster diving can be hazardous, due to potential exposure to biohazardous matter, broken glass, and overall unsanitary conditions that may exist in dumpsters. In January 2012, in La Jolla, Swiss-American man Alfonso de Bourbon was killed by a truck while dumpster diving.

=== Dumpster diving with criminal intentions (Garbage theft) ===
The unauthorized taking of materials from a dumpster or other waste disposal container is commonly referred to as "garbage theft". Dumpster diving is a different idiom. Due to the typical low value of the stolen goods, garbage theft is not typically recognized as a serious crime, with laws against it frequently focusing on combating identity theft instead. Depending on the state or nation's rules surrounding low-level crime, garbage theft may be considered a form of petty theft and subject to a penalty that often entails a brief period of incarceration, a modest fine, or both. As a privacy violation, discarded medical records as trash led to a $140,000 penalty against Massachusetts billing company Goldthwait Associates and a group of pathology offices in 2013 and a $400,000 settlement between Midwest Women's Healthcare Specialists and 1,532 clients in Kansas City in 2014.

Identity theft has historically been carried out through garbage theft, with thieves utilizing bank and credit card statements discovered in trash to assume the identity of a victim or access their credit.

Criminals have been known to dumpster dive for cash receipts as part of a scheme to steal items and return them for cash, a form of return fraud known as "shoplisting." Police investigating shoplifting in Bellingham, Washington, found dozens of receipts from retailers such as The Home Depot, Rite Aid and Fred Meyer, along with a list of items on the receipts. Suspects believed to have taken receipts from trash receptacles near Walmart locations were arrested for return fraud in 2016 in Madison, Wisconsin.

== Legal status ==
Since dumpsters are usually located on private premises, divers may occasionally get in trouble for trespassing while dumpster diving, though the law is enforced with varying degrees of rigor. Some businesses may lock dumpsters to prevent pickers from congregating on their property, vandalism to their property, and to limit potential liability if a dumpster diver is injured while on their property.

Police searches of discarded waste as well as similar methods are also generally not considered violations of privacy rights; evidence seized in this manner has been permitted in many criminal trials. In the United States this has been affirmed by numerous courts including and up to the Supreme Court, in the decision California v. Greenwood. The doctrine is not as well established in regard to civil litigation.

Companies run by private investigators specializing in such techniques have emerged as a result of the need for discreet, undetected retrieval of documents and evidence for civil and criminal trials. Private investigators have also written books on "P.I. technique" in which dumpster diving or its equivalent "wastebasket recovery" figures prominently.

=== By country ===
==== Belgium ====
In 2009, a Belgian dumpster diver and eco-activist nicknamed Ollie was detained for a month for removing food from a garbage can and was accused of theft and burglary. On February 25, 2009, he was arrested for removing food from a garbage can at an AD Delhaize supermarket in Bruges. Ollie's trial evoked protests in Belgium against restrictions from taking discarded food items.

==== Canada ====
In Ontario, Canada, the Trespass to Property Act—legislation dating back to the British North America Act 1867—grants property owners and security guards the power to ban anyone from their premises, for any reason, permanently. This is done by issuing a notice to the intruder, who will only be breaking the law upon return. Similar laws exist in Prince Edward Island and Saskatchewan. A recent case in Canada, which involved a police officer who retrieved a discarded weapon from a trash receptacle as evidence, created some controversy. The judge ruled the policeman's actions as legal although there was no warrant present, which led some to speculate the event as validation for any Canadian citizen to raid garbage disposals.

==== United Kingdom ====
Skipping in England and Wales may qualify as theft within the Theft Act 1968 or as common-law theft in Scotland, though there is very little enforcement in practice.

==== Germany ====
In Germany, dumpster diving is referred to as "containern", and a waste container's contents are regarded as the property of the container's owner. Therefore, taking items from such a container is viewed as theft. However, the police will routinely disregard the illegality of garbage picking since the items found are generally of low value. There has only been one known instance where people were prosecuted. In 2009 individuals were arrested on assumed burglary as they had surmounted a supermarket's fence which was then followed by a theft complaint by the owner; the case was suspended.

==== United States ====
In the United States, the fourth amendment protects against certain searches by the government without a warrant. The 1988 California v. Greenwood case in the U.S. Supreme Court held that there is no common law expectation of privacy for discarded materials, and that therefore the police did not require a warrant to search through trash.

There are, however, limits to what can legally be taken from a company's refuse.

===== Notable cases =====
In a 1983 Minnesota case involving the theft of customer lists from a garbage can, Tennant Company v. Advance Machine Company (355 N.W.2d 720), the owner of the discarded information was awarded $500,000 in damages.

In 1991, Stephen Slesinger, Inc., filed a lawsuit against Disney which alleged that Disney had breached their 1983 agreement by again failing to accurately report revenue from Winnie the Pooh sales. Though the Disney corporation was sanctioned by a judge for destroying forty boxes of evidentiary documents, the suit was later terminated by another judge when it was discovered that Slesinger's investigator had rummaged through Disney's garbage to retrieve the discarded evidence. Slesinger appealed the termination and, on 26 September 2007, a three-judge panel upheld the lawsuit dismissal.

== Items ==
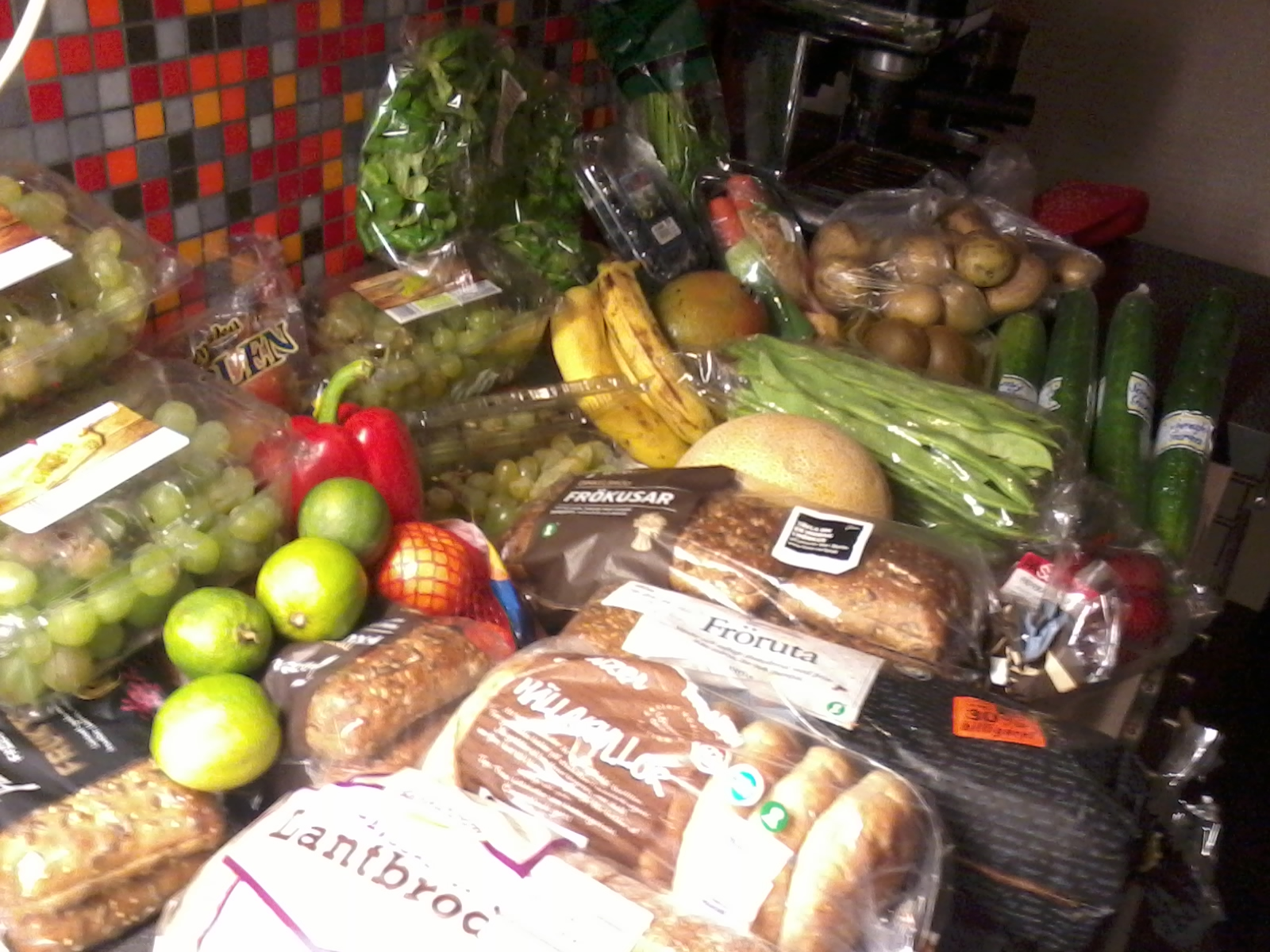
Food obtained by dumpster diving in Linköping, Sweden

Dumpster diving is practiced differently in developed countries than in developing countries.

- Food. In many developing countries, food is rarely thrown away unless it is rotten as food is scarce in comparison to developed nations. In countries like the United States, where 40 to 50 percent of food is wasted, the trash contains a lot more food to gather. In many countries, charities collect excess food from supermarkets and restaurants and distribute it to impoverished neighbourhoods. Trash pickers, Karung guni, Zabaleen, and rag and bone men in these countries may concentrate on looking for usable items or scrap materials to sell rather than food items. In the United States, Canada, and Europe, some bakeries, grocery stores, or restaurants will routinely donate food according to a Good Samaritan Food Donation Act, but more often, because of health laws or company policy, they are required to discard food items by the expiration date, because of overstock, being overly ripened, spoiled, cosmetically imperfect, or blemished.
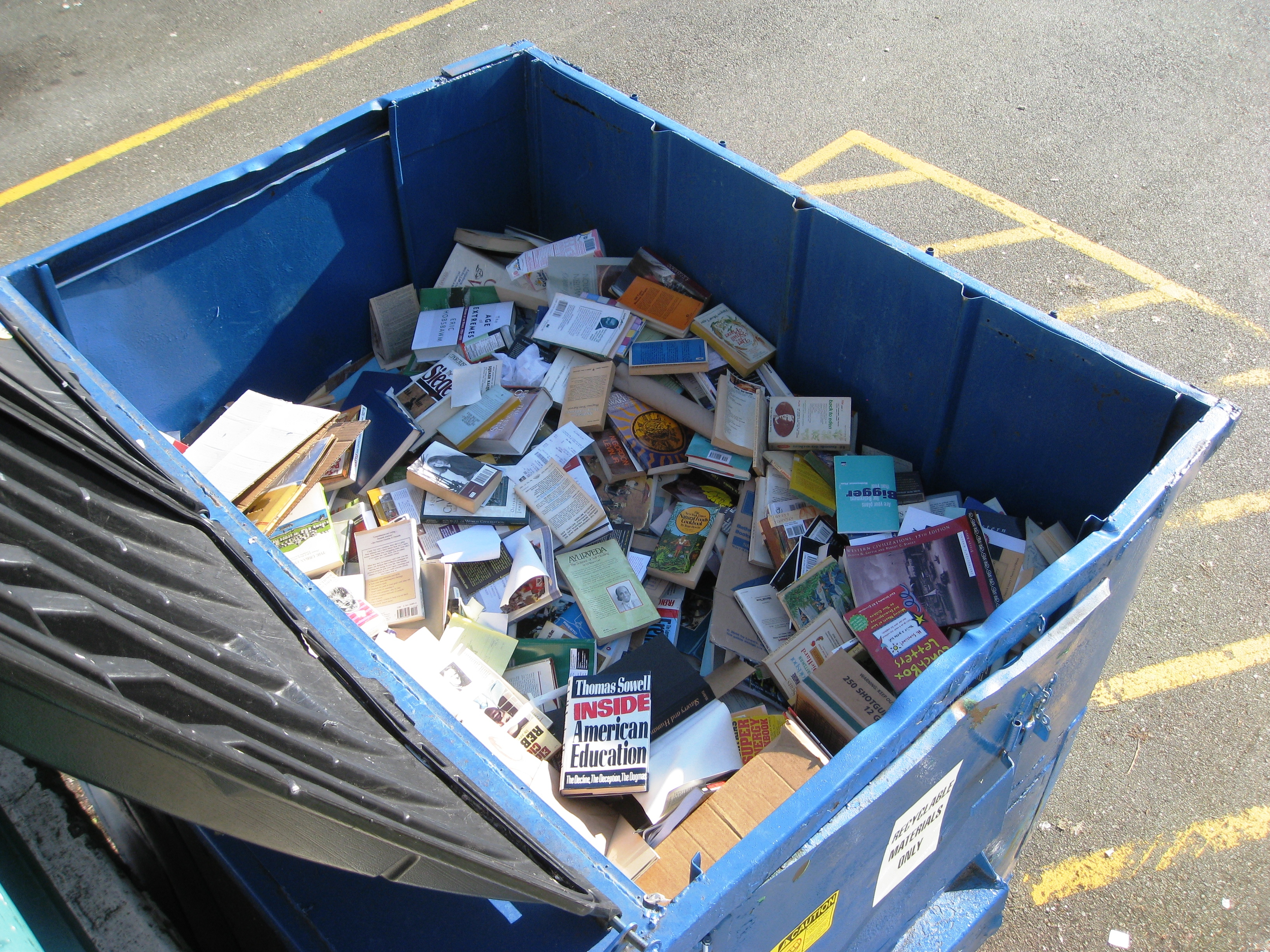
  Unsold books from a bookstore near the University of Washington are piled into a dumpster.
- Books and periodicals. As proof to publishing houses of unsold merchandise, booksellers will routinely remove the front covers of printed materials to render them destroyed prior to disposing of their remains in the garbage. Though readable, many damaged publications have disclaimers and legal notices against their existence or sale.
- Irregular or damaged goods. Offices, factories, department stores, and other commercial establishments may equally throw out non-perishable items that are irregular, were returned, have minor damages, or are replaced by newer inventory. Many items tend to be in such a state of disrepair or so cosmetically flawed that they will require some work to be made usable. For this reason, employees will at times intentionally destroy their items prior to being discarded to prevent them from being reused or resold.
- Returned items. Manufacturers often find it cheaper to routinely discard items returned as defective under warranty instead of repairing them, although a device is often repairable or usable as a source of spare parts to repair other, similar discarded devices.
- School supplies. At the end of each school year many perfectly useful supplies like pencils, pens, notebooks and art supplies are thrown away.
- Electronic waste. Some consumer electronics are dumped because of their rapid depreciation, obsolescence, cost to repair, or expense to upgrade. Owners of functional computers may find it easier to dump them rather than donate because many nonprofit organizations and schools are unable, or unwilling, to work with used equipment. Occasionally, vendors dispose of unsaleable, non-defective new merchandise as landfill. The Atari video game burial in Alamogordo, New Mexico, after the video game crash of 1983 is a well-known example; a 2014 excavation recovered about 1300 games for curation as museum exhibits or auction.

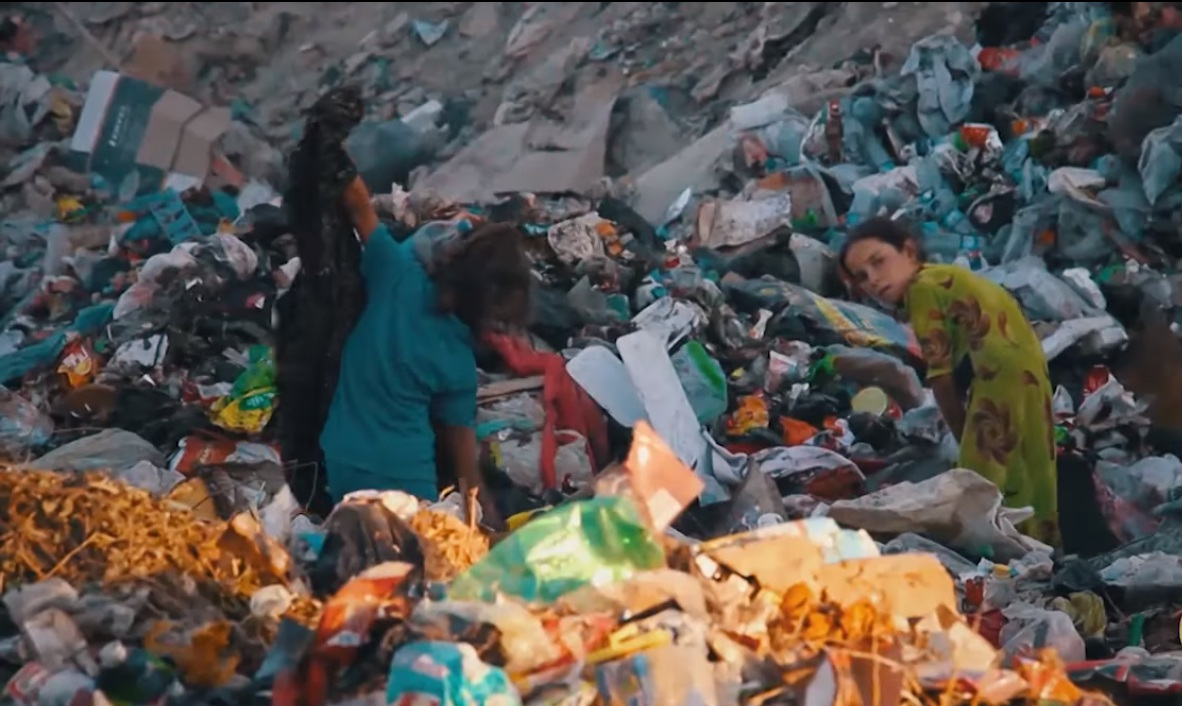
Two Iraqi girls pick up a cloth from garbage, Al-Fathel neighborhood of Baghdad.

- Clothing. While thrift stores routinely refuse used goods which they cannot cheaply and easily resell, the items which they do accept cost them nothing. There is therefore no shrinkage cost associated with discarding mendable garments, repairable appliances or even working donated items which are overstock or find no buyer after some arbitrary length of time.
- Metal. Sometimes waste may contain recyclable metals and materials that can be reused or sold to recycling plants and scrap yards. The most common recyclable metals found are steel and aluminum.
- Wood. Called urban lumberjacking, to salvage wood either for home heating, or home construction projects.
- Empty cans and bottles. Several countries, particularly in Northern Europe have enforced a system in which empty cans and bottles can be returned to stores for money. Usually the amount received per can/bottle is relatively low, so many simply discard them in dumpsters.
- Personal information: Cyber attackers may engage in dumpster diving to gather sensitive data, including IP addresses, bank account details, and Social Security numbers, by sifting through discarded mail or retrieving items disposed of in bins. Moreover, perpetrators may endeavor to broaden their contact databases by resorting to dumpster diving at corporate premises, aiming to obtain access to confidential and sensitive data, including phone lists or records.

=== Other sources ===
- Residential buildings. Clothing, furniture, appliances, and other housewares may be found at residential buildings.
- College dormitories. Items may be found at colleges with dormitories at the end of the semester when students throw away many items such as furniture, clothes and electronics.

== Notable instances ==
In the 1960s, Jerry Schneider, using recovered instruction manuals from The Pacific Telephone & Telegraph Company, used the company's own procedures to acquire hundreds of thousands of dollars' worth of telephone equipment over several years until his arrest.

The Castle Infinity videogame, after its shutdown in 2000, was brought back from the dead by a fan rescuing its servers from the trash.

In October 2013, in North London, three men were arrested and charged under the 1824 Vagrancy Act when they were caught taking discarded food: tomatoes, mushrooms, cheese and cakes from bins behind an Iceland supermarket. The charges were dropped on 29 January 2014 after much public criticism as well as a request by Iceland's chief executive, Malcolm Walker.

In 1996, the source code for the Atari 7800's BIOS and some of its games were discovered in the dumpster of the Atari office when the company closed.

== In popular culture ==
=== Books ===
- Author John Hoffman wrote two books based on his own dumpster-diving exploits: The Art and Science of Dumpster Diving (1993; ISBN 978-1-58160-550-1) and Dumpster Diving: The Advanced Course: How to Turn Other People's Trash into Money, Publicity, and Power (2002; ISBN 978-1-58160-369-9), and was featured in the documentary DVD The Ultimate Dive, which was directed by Suzanne Girot and described by the Internet Movie Database as a "tongue-in-cheek how-to film on the art and science of dumpster diving".
- In 2001, dumpster diving was popularized in the book Evasion, published by CrimethInc.
- In Kim Stanley Robinson's science fiction novel Fifty Degrees Below (2005), the character Frank Vanderwal joins, for a time, a group of freegans (referred to as "fregans" in the novel) who frequently prepare feasts culled from dumpsters; kind-hearted restaurateurs aid them by setting aside foods which have not been touched by the public.
- Jeff Ferrell, Professor of Sociology at Texas Christian University, is the author of Empire of Scrounge: Inside the Urban Underground of Dumpster Diving, Trash Picking, and Street Scavenging (2005; ISBN 978-0-81472-738-6).
- Cory Doctorow integrated garbage picking characters into the plots of his novels Someone Comes to Town, Someone Leaves Town and Pirate Cinema.
- David Boarder Gilles' A Mass Conspiracy to Feed People: Food Not Bombs and the World-class Waste of Global Cities (2021) is an ethnography of this global movement of grassroots soup kitchens that recover wasted grocery surpluses and redistribute them to those in need.

=== Television programs ===
- British television shows have featured home renovations and decoration using salvaged materials. Changing Rooms (1996–2004) is one such show, broadcast on BBC One.
- TLC's Extreme Cheapskates and Extreme Couponing featured people who regularly dumpster dive to avoid spending money on different items—in the case of the latter, unwanted newspapers and newspaper inserts containing coupons were the subject of dumpster diving.

=== Films ===
- Surfing the Waste: A Musical Documentary About Dumpster Diving, a film by Paul Aflalo, Sandra Lombardi and Tomoe Yoshihara, with music composed by Alden Penner and Nic Boshart.
- Dumpster Wars: Reno's Trash Politics (2008)
- I Love Trash (2007), a 30-minute documentary by David Brown and Greg Mann. OCLC's WorldCat provided a synopsis: "I Love Trash is a documentary about the art of dumpster diving. Starting with an empty apartment, only the clothes they were wearing and a flashlight, David and Greg find everything they might otherwise buy, in trash cans and dumpsters. All their food, clothes, electronics, art materials and entertainment, all out of the trash." Accolades: Skyfest Film and Script Festival, (won 2nd place for Documentary Films); and Lake Michigan Film Competition, (won 3rd place for Documentary films).
- The 2010 documentary film Dive!, a short documentary written and directed by Jeremy Seifert, investigates dumpster diving in the Los Angeles area. Dive! premiered in October 2009 at the Gig Harbor Film Festival, where it won the Audience Choice Award. It has gone on to win awards at many other film festivals, including Best Documentary at the DC Independent Film Festival and Best Film at the Dutch Environmental Film Festival.
- Spoils: Extraordinary Harvest. A short film/mystery film and documentary by Alex Mallis. (2012) Accolades: Official Selection, New Orleans Film Festival. Official Selection, Independent Film Festival of Boston. Official Selection, DOC NYC.
- The Leftovers: A Documentary about People Who Eat Trash (2008), a 28-minute Swedish documentary by Michael Cavanagh and Kerstin Übelacker. Mykel Bently, Paul Hood, Krystal Trickey, Nick Gill, and Sofia Arborelius (the latter two were exchange students) joined for this dumpster diver adventure.
- From Dumpster To Dinner Plate (2011), an award-winning New Zealand short documentary directed by Vanessa Hudson. "As the cost of food reaches record highs an underground movement of dumpster divers is rapidly gaining momentum fuelled by consumers who are forced to find creative ways to feed themselves."

== See also ==
- Salvage
  - Salvage data, the process of extracting data from damaged, failed, corrupted, or inaccessible primary storage media
  - Salvage archaeology, an archaeological survey and excavation carried out in areas threatened by construction or development
- Curb mining
- Dump digging
- Food
  - Food loss and waste
  - Food rescue
  - Pagpag
- Hunger
- Hunter-gatherer
- Information diving
  - Benjamin Pell
- Vermiculture
- Waste minimisation
