= Shipping insurance =

Service which may reimburse senders for lost parcels

Shipping insurance is a service which may reimburse senders whose parcels are lost, stolen, and/or damaged in transit.

In Canada and the US, shipping insurance is offered by postal services, courier companies, and shipping-insurance companies. Not all insurers will insure all goods. For example, postal services may not insure certain economy-class parcels for free, and some items cannot be insured.

First-party shipping-insurance services offered by postal services and courier companies may have many more restrictions than third-party shipping-insurance services. First-party insurance services may not pay out on claims unless the item was packed very carefully. Claimants also may need to provide proof of an item's value.

When practical, self-insurance is normally more economical than paying for insurance; see Limited consumer benefits.

== See also ==
- Cargo insurance
- UPS Capital
- Aviation insurance
- Lost in transit scam
