= Alfonso de Bourbon =

Swiss-American eccentric who claimed to be a descendant of the Spanish Royal Family

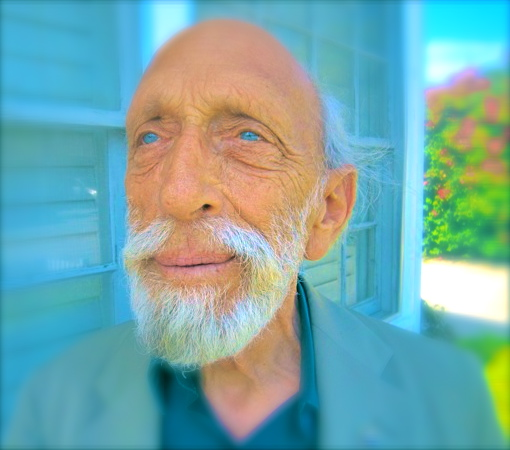
Alfonso de Bourbon in 2011

Alfonso de Bourbon Sampedro (born Leon Shafferman; 22 October 1932 – 10 January 2012), known as The Count, was a Swiss-American eccentric who claimed to be a descendant of the Spanish Royal Family and a first cousin of King Juan Carlos. Bourbon became one of the most recognizable residents of La Jolla, an affluent neighborhood of San Diego, California, where he lived for several decades. He was killed when a dumpster truck driver pinned him while he was dumpster diving.

== Background ==
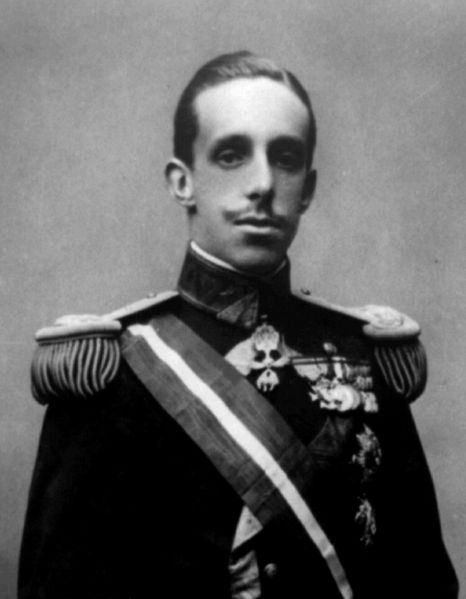
King Alfonso XIII in his youth

Alfonso de Bourbon was born Leon Shafferman in the south of Switzerland, but changed his name in 1968. His family came from Egypt. Morris Shafferman, his adopted father, was also an eccentric, and changed his name to Patrick Stewart. Bourbon attributed his lack of fingers to frostbite. In an interview with the Spanish historian José María Zavala, he claimed to have been born in Lausanne, Switzerland, and left there in the care of Roman Catholic nuns, who informed him that he was the illegitimate son of Alfonso, Count of Covadonga. The Count of Covadonga was the eldest son of King Alfonso XIII of Spain and Victoria Eugenie of Battenberg, and was heir apparent to the Spanish throne under the title of Prince of Asturias until he renounced his succession rights. Bourbon wrote a book about his alleged royal lineage. His physical resemblance to the King, polyglotism, manners, and ceremoniousness convinced many of his acquaintances that he was, in fact, of royal heritage.

Bourbon claimed to have learned Spanish, English, French, German, and Italian while at boarding school. He said he studied political science at the University of Paris and the Heidelberg University, and that he then worked as an interpreter for the United Nations in New York City. He explained that his father died in a car crash in Florida in 1938, and that he lived in Paris, Germany, and New York. In January 1969, The New York Times reported that Bourbon bid on La Peregrina pearl, which once belonged to the Spanish royal family:

An unsuccessful bidder was Prince Alfonso de Bourbon Asturias. In an interview later, he said: "I had telephoned-in a bid to $20,000. I didn't think it was going to reach $37,000. I wanted to make a gift of it to Queen Victoria Eugenia of Spain, in homage to her."

Bourbon was outbid by the actor Richard Burton, who bought it as 37th-birthday present to his wife, the actress Elizabeth Taylor. Bourbon's friends claimed that the Queen, who died later that year, left him enough money to sustain him for life. Nevertheless, Bourbon never laid claim to any inheritance to which he would have been entitled as a member of the royal family, and never contacted King Juan Carlos, his supposed first cousin.

== Life in La Jolla ==
In 1975, Bourbon moved from New York to La Jolla, a neighborhood in San Diego, California. Having quickly become one of the most recognizable residents of the neighborhood, where he owned a condominium apartment, Bourbon was a regular guest at fundraising parties for civic and social organizations, including the San Diego Opera. In the 1990s, Bourbon played a key role in establishing the sister city relationship between San Diego and the Spanish town of Alcalá de Henares. In 2010, he donated an historic map titled "The Spanish Heritage and Contribution to the American Independence 1512–1823" to the University of California, San Diego in celebration of Columbus Day and Hispanic Heritage Month, as well as in honor of the institution's 50th anniversary. He served as Navy League of the United States ambassador in 2011, and was also president of the San Diego-Alcalá de Henares Sister City Society, and led a few tourist trips to Alcalá de Henares.

Bourbon was known for his flirtatiousness. While living in La Jolla, he became involved with the socialite Magda Gabor, the eldest of the three Gabor sisters. Advised by her sisters, Gabor turned down his marriage proposal. He claimed to have been married once, but that the marriage was short-lived.

== Death ==
In his old age, Bourbon often cadged food and clothes from his neighbours. He was dumpster diving when he died around 6 p.m. on 10 January 2012; a tractor-trailer reversed and pinned him between a dumpster and a loading dock wall behind a market. The driver was unaware that Bourbon was there. The market employee who identified his body described him as "a colorful part of La Jolla" and "a nice man". A memorial service took place on 20 January at Mary Star of the Sea Catholic Church. On 21 February 2012, his remains were cremated and the ashes sent to the sea, which he had prepaid. The cremation and deposition of ashes was delayed because Bourbon's next of kin had to be notified, although they never responded. Bourbon's first cousin, living in Miami, explained that Bourbon's family cut contact with him 50 years earlier due to his eccentricity.

== Bibliography ==
- Zavala, José María. Bastardos y Borbones (Bastards and Bourbons). ISBN 978-84-01-38992-4.
