= Mary Star of the Sea Catholic Church, San Pedro, California =

Mary Star of the Sea Catholic Church
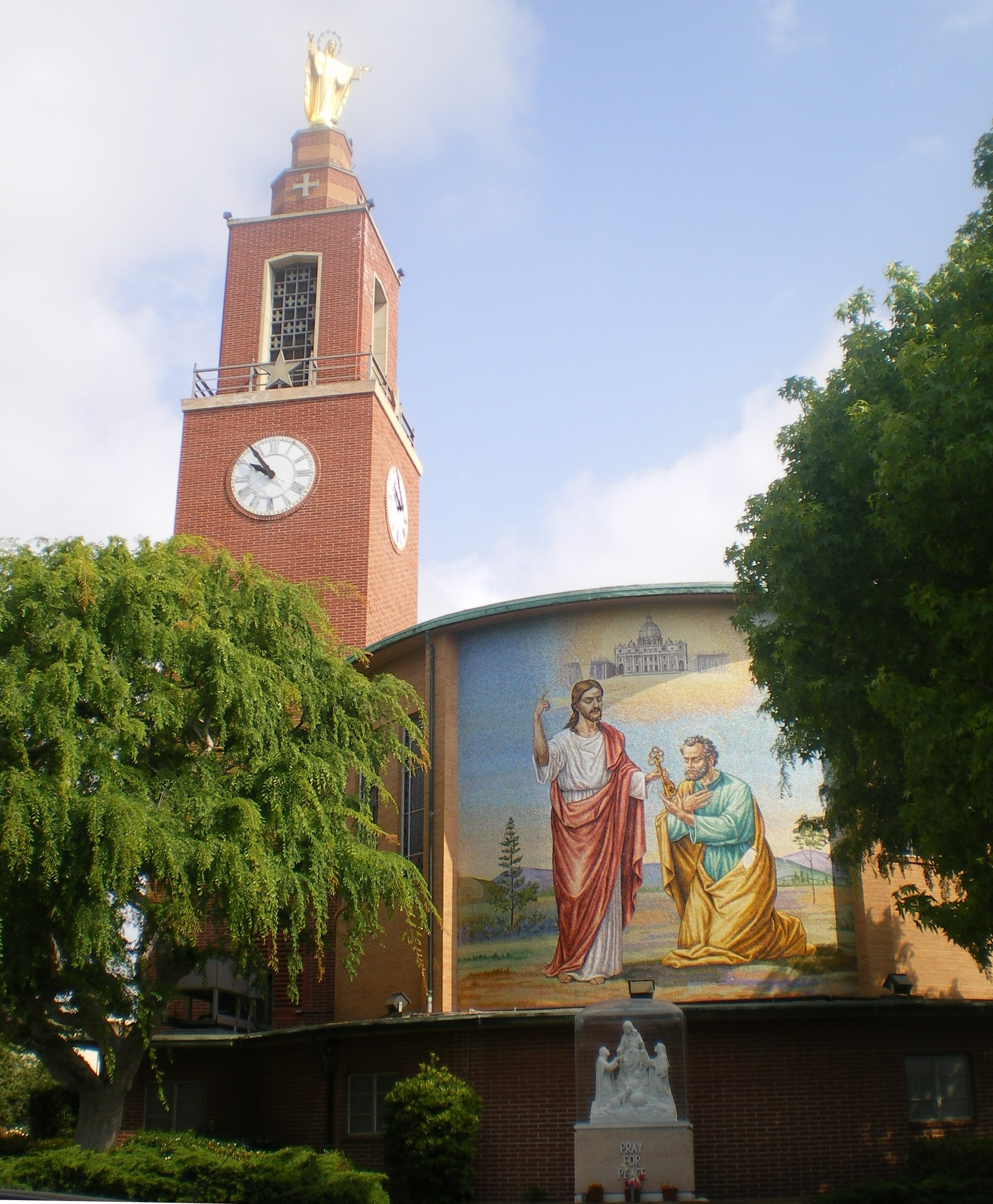
- Mary Star of the Sea Catholic Church
- 33.73744°N 118.29649°W
- Location: 870 W. 8th Street; San Pedro, California 90731
- Country: USA
- Denomination: Roman Catholic
- Website: www.marystar.org

History
- Founded: 1889
- Dedicated: 1958 (current church building)

Administration
- Division: San Pedro Pastoral Region
- Diocese: Archdiocese of Los Angeles

Clergy
- Archbishop: José Horacio Gómez
- Bishop: Oscar A. Solis
- Pastor: Rev. Maurice Harrigan

Mary Star of the Sea Catholic Church is a Roman Catholic parish located in San Pedro, California, dedicated to Our Lady, Star of the Sea. Located on a hill overlooking the Port of Los Angeles, Mary Star of the Sea has sometimes been known as the "Fishermen’s Parish" because of its close ties with the fishing and cannery community in San Pedro. Established in 1889, the parish is one of the oldest in the Los Angeles Archdiocese. The present church, built in 1958, is the third church to serve the parish.

Mary Star of the Sea serves approximately 5,500 registered families. For many decades, the parish community was made up largely of Croatian and Italian fishermen, ethnic groups that remain large presences in the parish, along with more recently arrived groups from Latin America and Asia, especially the Philippines.

== History ==
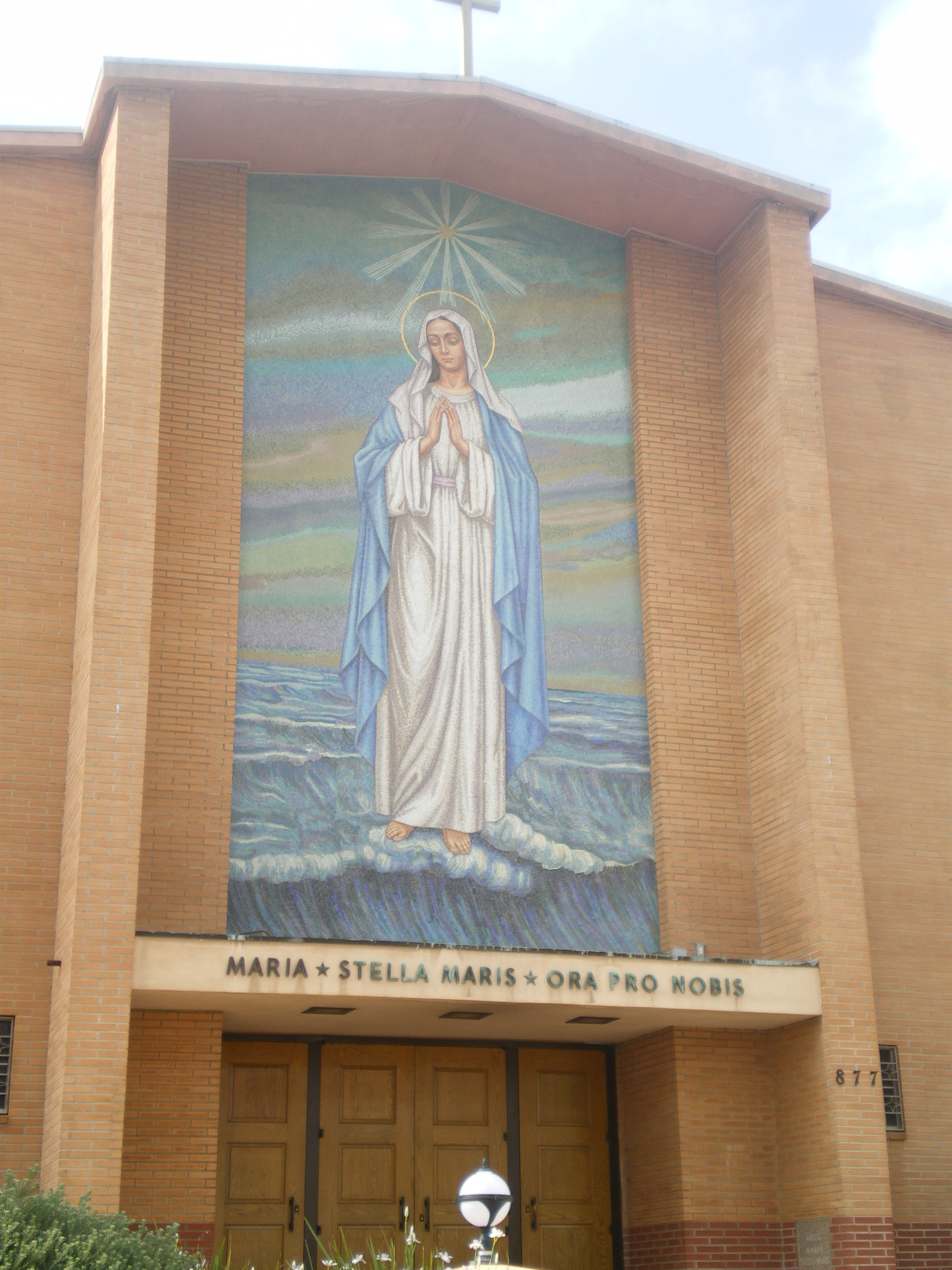
Front entrance, Mary Star of the Sea

San Pedro was incorporated as a city in 1888, and Mary Star of the Sea parish was formed one year later in 1889. The original church, built in the 1890s, was a small wooden structure on West Ninth Street. In 1905, a larger church was built on Vinegar Hill (NW corner 9th St and Centre St). An elementary school opened in 1914, under the direction of the Sisters of the Immaculate Heart of Mary.

Father Maximus Benso, a native of Italy, purchased the land in 1919 that eventually accommodated the church and school. Father Benso died in 1981 at age 96, having served the church for more than 70 years.

Father James McLaughlin, the parish's eighth pastor and a native of Ireland, established the "Apostleship of the Sea," a Catholic organization for the merchant marine.

For nearly 30 years from 1946 to 1975, Msgr. George M. Scott was the pastor. When Msgr. Scott arrived, the parish community included 10,000 Croatians and 5,000 Italians, mostly fishermen, cannery workers, and their families. Msgr. Scott oversaw the construction of the current church in 1958, as well as a new convent, an elementary school and high school. In September, 1951, Mary Star of the Sea High School opened with classes initially being held in the elementary school. Msgr. Scott also served as the national president of the Apostleship of the Sea.

When Msgr. Scott retired in 1975, Msgr. Thomas Kiefer became the pastor and also served as Port Chaplain until 1984.

Msgr. Patrick Gallagher served as the pastor from 1984 until his death in April 2008. Seven months before his death, Msgr. Gallagher celebrated the opening of the new Mary Star of the Sea High School after overseeing the development and construction for 13 years. When the new high school was dedicated, Msgr. Gallagher said: "[T]here were lots of challenges. We just faced them and went on. I never, never doubted the high school would be built. That's not my personality to give up." Msgr. Gallagher also directed the establishment of the Perpetual Adoration Chapel located at the front of the church. Interviewed in 2003, Msgr. Gallager said, "This parish is the center of my life, really. I am happy serving here. I find great fulfillment here and I find great support with the people. I really love these people."

== "Fishermen's Parish" ==
Mary Star of the Sea's renown comes principally from its relationship with the port and San Pedro's fishing community. The bronze statue of Mary atop the bell tower, lit up at night, has been a beacon for fishermen since 1958.

=== Close ties between fishermen and church ===
In a July 2001, the Los Angeles Times published a feature article on San Pedro, noting the central and longstanding role played by Mary Star of the Sea in the community:

Croatian, Portuguese and Italian fishing families, many of them Catholic, founded San Pedro. Content with the beauty of the hills rising from the harbor, they built their homes, their church, their businesses and dutifully produced large families to do the same. More than 100 years later, some of their children and grandchildren and great-grandchildren live in those family homes, work still on the docks or in town and worship still at Mary Star of the Sea. The town's population has remained steady for the last two decades, and there is a sense of continuity that is palpable in this town, an intimacy--among the people, and between the people and the place.

=== Hard times for the fishing community ===
The San Pedro fishing industry reached its peak in the 1940s, and fell into decline by the 1980s with the closure of canneries and increased foreign competition. For many years, the annual blessing of the fleet, seeking God's blessing for a bountiful harvest and for the fleet's safety, drew large crowds to San Pedro. At its peak the blessing of the fleet drew 100,000 people and 200 fishing boats. However, by 1987, the crowd gathered for the blessing had dwindled to 200 people and 16 fishing boats, as the Los Angeles Times reported that the poor turnout was "a sad reminder of the story of the San Pedro fishing industry," which had "fallen upon stormy economic seas." The blessing ceremony was also accompanied for many years by a festival that attracted up to 250,000 visitors in the late 1960s, and included a boat parade that was reportedly the second most photographed event in the nation, trailing only Pasadena's Rose Parade. In 1985, Mary Star of the Sea began to offer a special fishermen's Mass on the same day as the blessing of the fleet. At the 1987 fishermen's Mass, Msgr. Gallagher told the congregation: "Times have changed. The fishing industry is not what it used to be. But yet we've seen this remnant of people . . . who adjust to the changing conditions, who persevere in the face of adversity. We pray in a very special way for the abundance of the fish of the sea, for the fishermen, that they will truly have a great catch."

=== "Miracle" of the giant fish ===
The fishermen's prayers may have been answered in 1989, as a record tuna catch brought an infusion of prosperity to San Pedro's fishermen and also to Mary Star of the Sea. The catch that year included 767 of the biggest Pacific blue fin tuna ever taken by a commercial fishing fleet, each fish weighing 300 to 1,000 pounds—a size never seen or caught before. The giant tuna generated "the biggest excitement in years for San Pedro's fishing fleet." One San Pedro fisherman referred to the unusual catch as "God's gift to the San Pedro fishermen," and another called it "a miracle." At the time, the Los Angeles Times did a feature article on the giant fish, focusing on the tight relationship between the fishermen and Mary Star of the Sea. The article noted that the fishermen and cannery workers of San Pedro had provided most of the funding to build the new Mary Star of the Sea Catholic Church in the 1950s. Msgr. Gallagher, interviewed by the Times, noted that the church, too, had benefited from the fishermen's good fortune: "Our collections the last couple of months are noticeably higher than usual. I think you can thank those big fish."

== Bronze statue of Mary ==
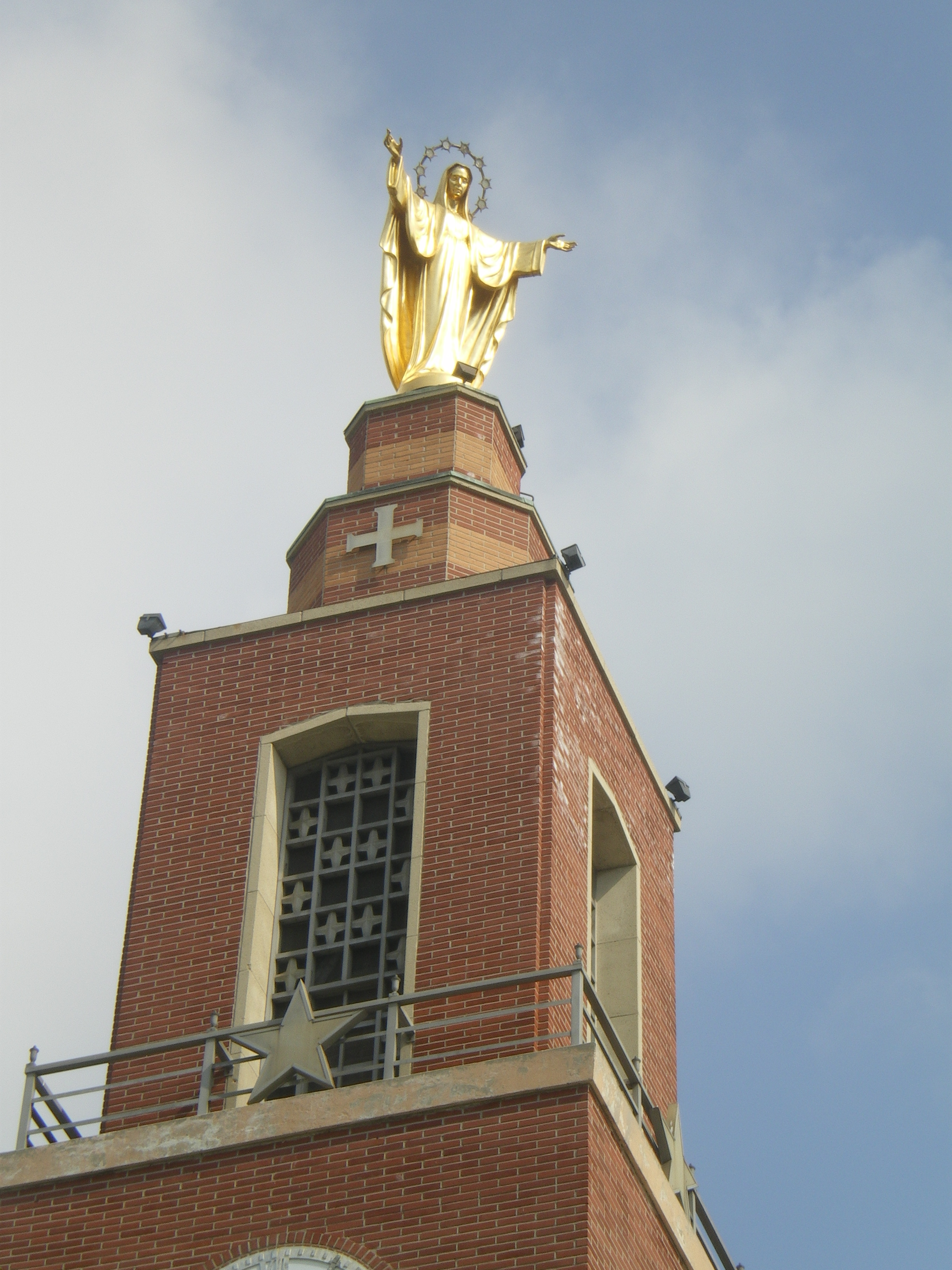
Ten-foot bronze statue of Mary looking out over the Port of Los Angeles from atop the bell tower

The symbol of Mary Star of the Sea is the 10-foot bronze statue of Mary mounted on top of the church's bell tower, her arms outstretched toward the Port of Los Angeles. The bronze statue was a gift of the parish's fisherman. In a 1961 interview, Msgr. Scott noted that the parish's fisherman had set aside $7,000 from their "often meager tuna-catch earnings" to pay for the statue. Msgr. Scott encouraged the fishermen in his parish to build altars on fishing ships and asked fleet skippers to pass along their religious beliefs to their crews.

In 1989 the new pastor, Msgr. Gallagher, noted the importance of the bronze statue: "Our parish gets its name from the fishermen - the Virgin Mary guiding and protecting them when they are at sea. The statue of Mary on top of the church on the hill overlooking the harbor is lit every night so the fishermen can see her when they enter or leave the harbor on their boats."

Other elements of the church also carry out the fishing fleet theme. Prominent among those elements is the large statue of Mary standing over the altar, cradling a tuna clipper in her arms. There is also a large mosaic of Mary standing on the ocean waves above the church's front entrance. Below the mural, the word "Stella Maris" are written, words used as a sign of hope since the fifth century in liturgical literature. In the 12th century St. Bernard offered this prayer: "If the winds of temptation arise…look to the star. If you are tossed upon the waves…look to the star; call on Mary." Finally, a large stained-glass window to the right of the altar depicts Jesus in a boat speaking to the fisherman.

== Controversy over pregnant teen's participation in graduation ceremony ==
In 1986, Mary Star of the Sea drew media attention when a 17-year-old, straight-A honor student and student council vice president, Lisa Martinez, was barred from graduation at the parish high school because she was 6-1/2 months pregnant. After the action drew protests from students and criticism in the press, Archbishop Roger Mahony overruled the school's decision. Archbishop Mahony praised the girl for "resisting the pressure to conform to the unacceptable 'abortion option.'" He said the church should assist, not alienate, pregnant girls. "She has chosen to respect the dignity of the human life she now carries and nurtures," the Archbishop said. When the Archbishop's statement was read at a special assembly held in the church, students applauded, screamed and jumped out of their seats. In his statement, Mahony noted that the parish's pastor, Msgr. Gallagher, and the school's principal "were following in total good faith" the guidelines of the archdiocese, but suggested that the school board formulate new guidelines. Mahony emphasized that he was not condoning premarital sex, but recognizing that "wounded human nature is vulnerable to failure and to sinfulness."

== Pastors ==
- Father Charles Tanquerey, 1889-
- Father Michael Conneally, - 1912
- Father Maximus Benso
- Father Anthony Jacobs, 1930–1934
- Father James McLaughlin, 1934–1946
- Msgr. George M. Scott, 1946–1975
- Msgr. Thomas Kiefer, 1975–1984
- Msgr. Gallager, 1984–2008
- Father John Provenza 2008-2012
- Father Brian Nunes Administrator Pro Tem 2012-2014
- Reverend Father Maurice Harrigan, 2014–Present
