= Cooling-off period (consumer rights) =

Time when a consumer may cancel a purchase or return goods

In consumer rights legislation and practice, a cooling-off period is a period of time following a purchase when the purchaser may choose to cancel a purchase, and return goods which have been supplied, for any reason, and obtain a full refund.

== Laws ==
Many nations have passed laws that create cooling off periods for specific transactions, although the conditions under which they may apply and the transactions covered by the laws varies significantly by jurisdiction. For example, within the United States, the federal government imposes 72-hour cooling-off periods for many consumer transactions completed at home or away from the seller's traditional place of business. Many U.S. states impose versions of those cooling-off period laws, and offer similar laws for an additional range of transactions, such as time share purchases and health club contracts. For example, California provides cooling-off periods for many consumer transactions, including insurance purchases, car warranties, dental services, and weight-loss services. The European Union allows residents of member states to seek refunds for goods and services purchased outside of a shop, such as by telephone, mail order or in response to a door-to-door sales pitch, to cancel the transaction, return any purchase and obtain a refund within fourteen days.

== Refund policies ==
Although not technically cooling off periods, many retailers voluntarily grant purchasers a defined period of time during which they may return products that have not been damaged and remain in salable condition.

Some jurisdictions require retailers to offer return policies. For example, in the European Union the Consumer Rights Directive of 2011 obliges member states to give purchasers the right to return goods or cancel services purchased from a business away from a normal commercial premises, such as online, mail order, or door-to-door, with limited exceptions, within two weeks or one year if the seller did not clearly inform the purchaser of their rights from the receipt of the goods, for a full refund. The Consumer Rights Directive is implemented in the United Kingdom by the Consumer Contracts (Information, Cancellation and Additional Charges) Regulations 2013. These regulations extended the cooling-off period in the UK from seven calendar days to 14 days.

== Experimental economics ==
The effects of cooling-off periods have been studied in experimental economics in the context of the so-called ultimatum game. In this game, one party makes an offer to divide a pie (say, 10 dollars). Then another party can accept or reject the offer. When the offer (say, 8 dollars for the first party and 2 dollars for the second party) is accepted, the parties get the respective payments. When the offer is rejected, both parties get zero. Cooling-off periods can reduce the rejection rates of unfair offers when the parties perceive the stakes to be large.

== See also ==
- Buyer's remorse
- Consumer protection
