= Product return =

Return of a purchased product for a refund

The return policy posted at a Target store

In retail, a product return (PR) is the process of a customer taking previously purchased merchandise back to the retailer, and in turn receiving a refund in the original form of payment, exchange.

Many retailers will accept returns provided that the customer has a receipt as a proof of purchase, and that certain other conditions, which depend on the retailer's policies, are met. These may include the merchandise being in a certain condition (usually resellable if not defective), no more than a certain amount of time having passed since the purchase, and sometimes that identification be provided (though usually only if a receipt is not provided). In some cases, only exchanges or store credit are offered, again usually only without a receipt, or after an initial refund period has passed. Some retailers charge a restocking fee for non-defective returned merchandise, but typically only if the packaging has been opened.

There are various reasons why customers may wish to return merchandise. These include a change of one's mind (buyer's remorse), quality of the merchandise, personal dissatisfaction, or a mistaken purchase of the wrong product. For clothing or other sized items, it may be a lack of a correct fit. Sometimes, there may be a product recall in which the manufacturer has requested (or been ordered) that the merchandise be brought back to the store. Also, gift receipts are offered sometimes when an item is purchased for another person, and the recipient can exchange this item for another item of comparable value, or for store credit, often on a gift card.

== Legislation ==
While retailers are not usually required to accept returns, laws in many places require retailers to post their return policy in a place where it would be visible to the customer prior to purchase. Legislation exists in various parts of the world giving consumers the right to return goods in as-supplied condition for a full refund, within a set period of time, known as a cooling-off period. Sometimes this legislation only applies to distance sales such as e-commerce.

In certain countries, such as Australia, consumer rights dictate that under certain situations consumers have a right to demand a refund. These situations include sales that relied on false or misleading claims, defective goods, and undisclosed conditions of sale.

== Economic impact ==
In the US, an estimated 8–10% of in-store sales is returned whereas online sales may result in 25–40% returns. In Asia and Europe, less than 5 percent of purchases are returned. US shoppers returned $396 billion worth of purchases in 2018 – brick-and-mortar and online, according to the National Retail Federation (NRF). To fight high return rates in e-commerce, a realistic product visualization is needed. Next to imagery and video content, 3D technology like augmented reality and virtual reality, but also simply 3D in the browser can enhance the shopping experience and lower return rates.

In the UK, logistics costs for returns are estimated at between £20bn and £60bn per year. Figures show that 33% of retailers had to increase prices to counter rising returns volumes whilst 31% of retailers said managing returns impacts their profits. For some companies the costs of accepting returns amounts to as much as 5% of their annual turnover. Companies who have imposed charges for returning goods include Zara, Mango and Uniqlo.

Return windows (the time allowed by a retailer during which a return will be permitted) vary between companies and countries. A University of Bamberg survey found that German companies allow longer return windows, 53.5 days on average, than those allowed in other European countries, averaging only 29.6 days.

== Accounting ==
In accounting, sales returns are goods or merchandise that are sent back to the seller, as well as discounts taken from defective products. To complete a return using GAAP, revenue is not reduced when doing a sales refund. Instead refunds are debited as sales return and allowance and credited as cash or accounts receivable, depending on whether the customer paid on account. Additionally, one must debit cost of goods sold and credit inventory.

== Issues ==
=== Fraudulent returns ===
In the United States, various abuses using the return process allegedly cost retailers more than $9 billion annually.

One common practice is the use of the system in order to "borrow" the merchandise at no charge. The customer who engages in this practice purchases the item for temporary use, then returns it when finished. Examples include an article of clothing worn for a single occasion, or a book that is returned after it has been read. This practice is called "wardrobing". Stores such as Macy's and Ross put large "do not remove" tags on women's dresses to try to defeat this, not accepting returns or exchanges for any items that do not have the tag. Many stores also refuse to refund certain items like reading materials, inflatable airbeds (Target and Walmart), and even portable heaters (Dollar General).

Another problem is when customers legitimately purchase an item, then re-enter the store with the receipt, take an identical item off the shelf, and approach the customer service desk requesting a refund. In the process, they essentially receive the item for free, and may be charged with shoplifting or another similar crime if caught.

Others have been reported to print fake receipts which they use to return stolen merchandise for a cash refund. However, this is nearly impossible now that most stores use individually numbered receipts. Scanning the receipt's barcode at the cash register links legitimate returns to a database that validates the original purchase. (Despite this, some stores that have had such systems for years still refuse to accept a photocopy of a legitimate receipt where the original may have been misplaced, or obscured due to the store's use of cheap thermal paper or very light ink.)

=== Denying returns ===
Some retailers have turned to a practice in which customers who return or exchange items excessively (beyond the guidelines set by a retailer) may be prevented from making a return or exchange with that particular company.

In the United States, a company called The Retail Equation (formerly The Return Exchange) collects data from participating retailers via a swipe of a driver's license, or most other types of government issued photo identification. The information found on the license is collected into a database, and other stores operated by that particular retail company can use this information to deny a return. This system can be used to prevent various problems, such as return fraud. These controversial practices of collecting information have been addressed by privacy rights advocates and spurred a movement for boycotting chains that collect consumers' private information and allow third party sources to use it.

The request for a form of identification for returning products and collecting the information has stirred controversy, especially if the customer that purchased the product was a minor (under the age of 18). Immigrant rights groups have voiced serious concern over the practice since most illegal immigrants do not have a state ID or a drivers license and this practice could potentially be used to discriminate against them, however, all of the stores that are associated with The Retail Equation, accepts all types of government issued photo identification, including, but not limited to, driver's licences (regardless of issuing state), state identification card (regardless of issuing state), passports (regardless of issuing country), Mexican matricula consular documents, concealed carry firearm permits (regardless of issuing state), and uniformed services identification cards.

== History ==
Product returns were first used in business strategies in the 1960s and 1970s.

== See also ==
- Cooling-off period (consumer rights)
- Lemon law
- Money back guarantee
- Package redirection scam
- Return merchandise authorization
- Reverse logistics
- Warranty
