= Return fraud =

Act of defrauding a retail store via the product return process

Return fraud is the act of defrauding a retail store by means of the return process, returning goods ineligible for refund to a retailer in exchange for money or other goods. There are various ways in which this crime is committed. For example, the offender may return stolen merchandise to secure cash, steal receipts or receipt tape to enable a falsified return, or use somebody else's receipt to try to return an item picked up from a store shelf.

A report by Deloitte and the loss-prevention software company Appriss Retail estimated that US retailers lost $103 billion to fraudulent returns and claims in 2024, about 15% of the returns projected for that year. Return fraud and theft have been reported to lead to price increases for shoppers. The National Retail Federation's 2025 returns report, produced with Happy Returns, found that 9% of all returns were fraudulent. Some stores create strict return policies such as "no receipt, no return" or impose return time restrictions.

== Types ==
Some examples of return fraud include:

- Bricking: Purchasing a working electronic item, deliberately damaging or stripping it of valuable components to render it unusable, then returning the item for profit.
- Cross-retailer return: Returning or exchanging an item purchased at another retailer (usually at a lower price) for cash, store credit, or a similar, higher-priced item at another retailer.
- Employee fraud: Obtaining assistance from employees in the return of stolen goods for their retail price.
- Open-box fraud: Purchasing an item from a store and returning it opened with the intent to re-purchase it at a lower price under the store's open-box policies. A variation of price-switching.
- Price arbitrage: Purchasing differently priced, but similar-looking merchandise and returning the cheaper item as the expensive one.
- Price switching: Placing a higher-priced label on purchased merchandise with the intention of returning the item at a higher price than was paid for the purchase.
- Receipt fraud: Utilizing reused, stolen, or falsified receipts to return merchandise for profit.
- Returning stolen or discarded merchandise: Shoplifting with the objective to return the item(s) for full price, plus any sales tax.
- Switch fraud: Purchasing a working item, and returning a damaged or defective identical item that was already owned, or simulated merchandise in the original product packaging.

Return policies have historically served as the primary way for retailers to combat return fraud and abuse; the challenge is keeping policies from being overly restrictive or inconsistently interpreted, both of which may discourage loyal customers and affect purchases. Automated solutions have also been developed to help combat return fraud and abuse, including software programs that detect such behavior and help retailers determine whether a return is valid.

== Wardrobing ==
Wardrobing, purchasing merchandise for short-term use with the intent to return the item, has been described by industry advocates as a form of return fraud. Wardrobing is a form of return fraud where an item is purchased, used, and then returned to the store for a refund.

Wardrobing is most often done with expensive clothing, hence the name. Customers purchase the clothing, wear it with the price tags and if necessary the ink tag, but then return the used item demanding a product return refund of some sort. This type of retail fraud may be a social phenomenon, for example when the customer wants to wear stylish outfits. This type of return fraud is also common with tools, electronics, and even computers. To prevent this practice, some stores make certain items unreturnable, or place conspicuous tags on clothing while prohibiting returns once those tags are removed.

== Responses ==
Some stores automatically flag a customer who returns over a certain number of items within a set amount of time. When available, footage of the flagged customer may be reviewed by the retailer's loss prevention department for evidence of unlawful activity.

Where store credit is given without a receipt, the credit may be "section limited". For example, if someone returns children's clothing without a receipt, they may be given a credit valid only for children's clothing.

Some stores apply unique serial numbers to their items, embedded into a bar code or hidden elsewhere on the item. If a serial number on an item to be returned does not match the serial number associated with the sale, the retailer can refuse the refund.

== See also ==
- Shoplifting
