= Francesco Barberino Benici =

Italian mathematician

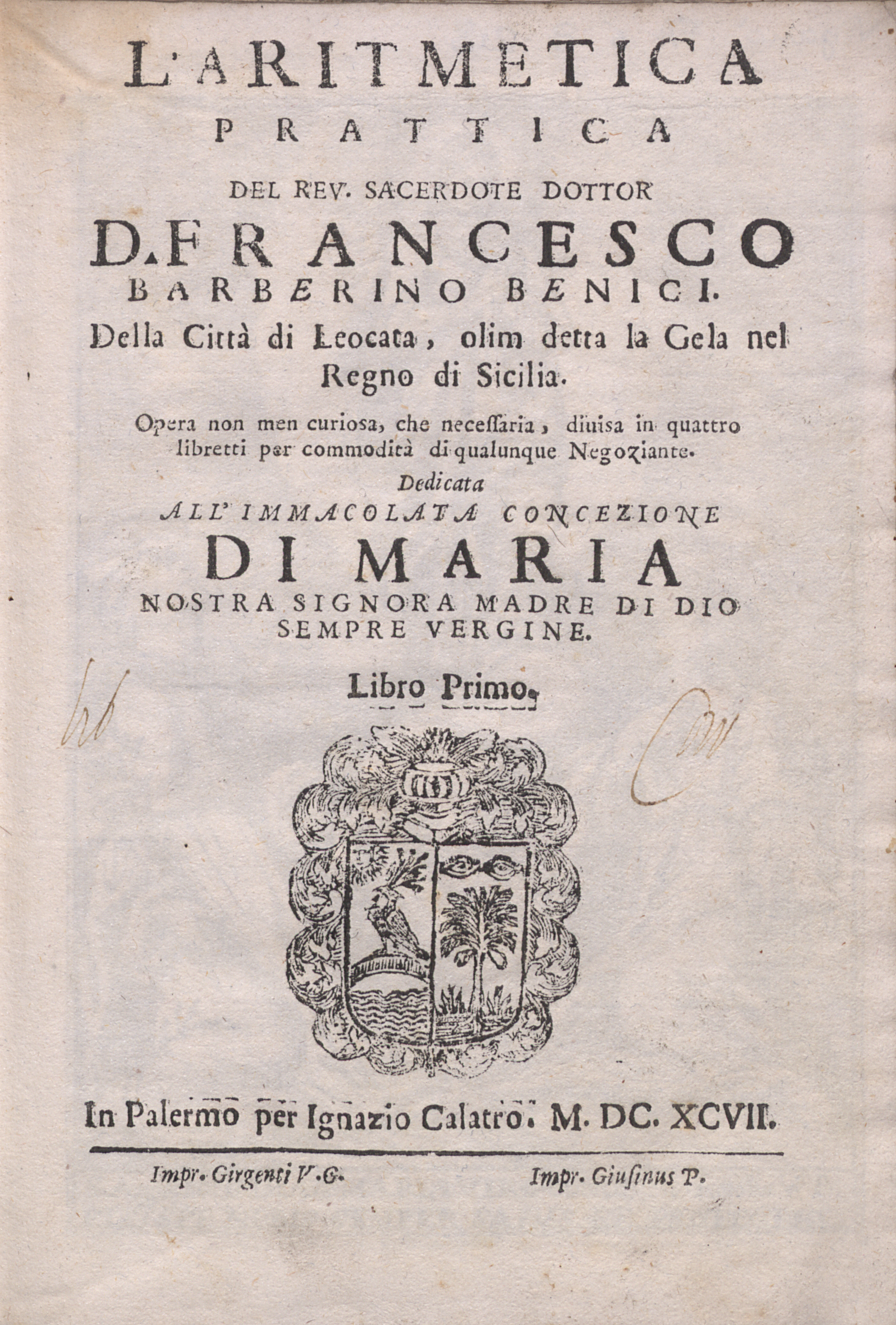
Aritmetica prattica (1697)

Francesco Barberino Benici (3 December 1642 – 26 September 1702) was an Italian mathematician.

He was among the first popularizers of mathematics for shopkeepers, along with Elia Del Re, Christopher Clavius, and Domenico Griminelli.

== Works ==
- Aritmetica prattica (in Italian). Palermo: Ignazio Calatro. 1697.
