= Tom Coughlin (Walmart executive) =

American businessman

- Born: June 6, 1949
- Died: April 1, 2016 (aged 66); Bentonville, Arkansas
- Education: California State University
- Occupation: Businessman
- Employer: Wal-Mart Stores, Inc.
- Spouse: Cynthia Coughlin
- Children: 3

Thomas Martin Coughlin (June 6, 1949 – April 1, 2016) was an American businessman who served as vice chairman of Wal-Mart Stores, Inc. and confidant of founder Sam Walton.

Coughlin was a native of Cleveland, Ohio. He attended California State University, and earned a bachelor's degree in political science.

== Early life ==
Coughlin grew up in Cleveland and was the son of a police detective. He attended St. Edward High School in Lakewood, Ohio, a western suburb of Cleveland, and graduated in 1967. He graduated from California State University in 1972 and earned a bachelor's degree in political science. While attending Cal State, he played football.

Coughlin began his career with R. H. Macy's West Coast division as a store detective. After several years in various loss prevention positions with Cook United in Cleveland, Coughlin interviewed at Wal-Mart.

== Career with Walmart ==
Coughlin began his career with the retailer in 1978 in the company's security division and eventually became vice president of loss prevention. He later became vice president of human resources. From January 1998 to January 1999, he was executive vice president and chief operating officer of the flagship Wal-Mart Stores Division. The next year, he headed the Wal-Mart Stores Division.

In January 2001, Coughlin was elected to the board of directors for ChoicePoint, a publicly traded data aggregation firm. That same year, he was elected to the Walmart board of directors. In August 2002, he was also given the title of CEO for Sam's Club USA. The following April, he became executive vice president and vice chairman of Wal-Mart Stores, Inc.

On December 6, 2004, Walmart announced that Coughlin would retire effective January 24, 2005. When Coughlin's retirement was announced, Walmart praised Coughlin for his longtime success at the corporation. Walmart CEO Lee Scott said in a company-issued press release, "Tom Coughlin has achieved one of the most successful business careers that anyone could imagine".

Walmart Chairman Rob Walton, added that "I particularly respect the special relationship that he has built with our associates in the field. This says a lot about how well Tom Coughlin represents the Walmart culture".

== Legal troubles ==
In March 2005, Walmart announced that Coughlin had resigned from the board of directors as a result of an internal investigation. The investigation alleged that the use of corporate-owned gift cards and personal reimbursements estimated to be in the range of $100,000 to $500,000.

Beginning in July 2005, he was the subject of a United States Department of Justice investigation, as well as a lawsuit by Walmart, and was reviewed by a federal grand jury over misuse of company gift cards. When the charges first surfaced in April 2005, Coughlin claimed the money he embezzled was being used to pay bribes to trade union officials not to organize at Walmart locations and to identify pro-union Walmart workers.

He pleaded guilty to five counts of wire fraud and one count of filing a false tax return related to embezzlement and theft from Walmart while serving as a member of its board. U.S. Attorney Robert Balfe told reporters the investigation had found no evidence backing Coughlin's earlier claims that the money he took was reimbursement for anti-union activities.

Coughlin was sentenced on August 11, 2006, at Fort Smith, Arkansas, to 33 months in home detention after pleading guilty to stealing money, merchandise and gift cards from the retailer. He avoided any prison detention, but was ordered to serve five years probation, and pay a $50,000 fine and about $411,000 in restitution to Wal-Mart Stores, Inc., and the Internal Revenue Service. He also was sentenced to 27 months of home detention.

A physician stated in court that Coughlin was in poor health, suffering from diabetes, cardiac disease, sleep apnea, arterial blockage, and other ailments.

=== Other lawsuits ===
Certain former Walmart employees filed lawsuits against Coughlin for their purportedly inadvertent roles in his embezzlement of Walmart funds. Former Administrative Manager Patsy Stephens deposited Walmart money into her personal bank account and then wrote checks for her immediate supervisor (Robert Hey), for Coughlin, and for cash. She claimed she thought these practices were for the benefit of the company. She was convicted on eight counts of wire fraud by a federal jury in November 2007.

== Personal life ==
Coughlin was close friends and hunting companion to Walmart's founder, Sam Walton.

Coughlin died on April 1, 2016.
