= Store detective =

Plainclothes worker in retail loss prevention

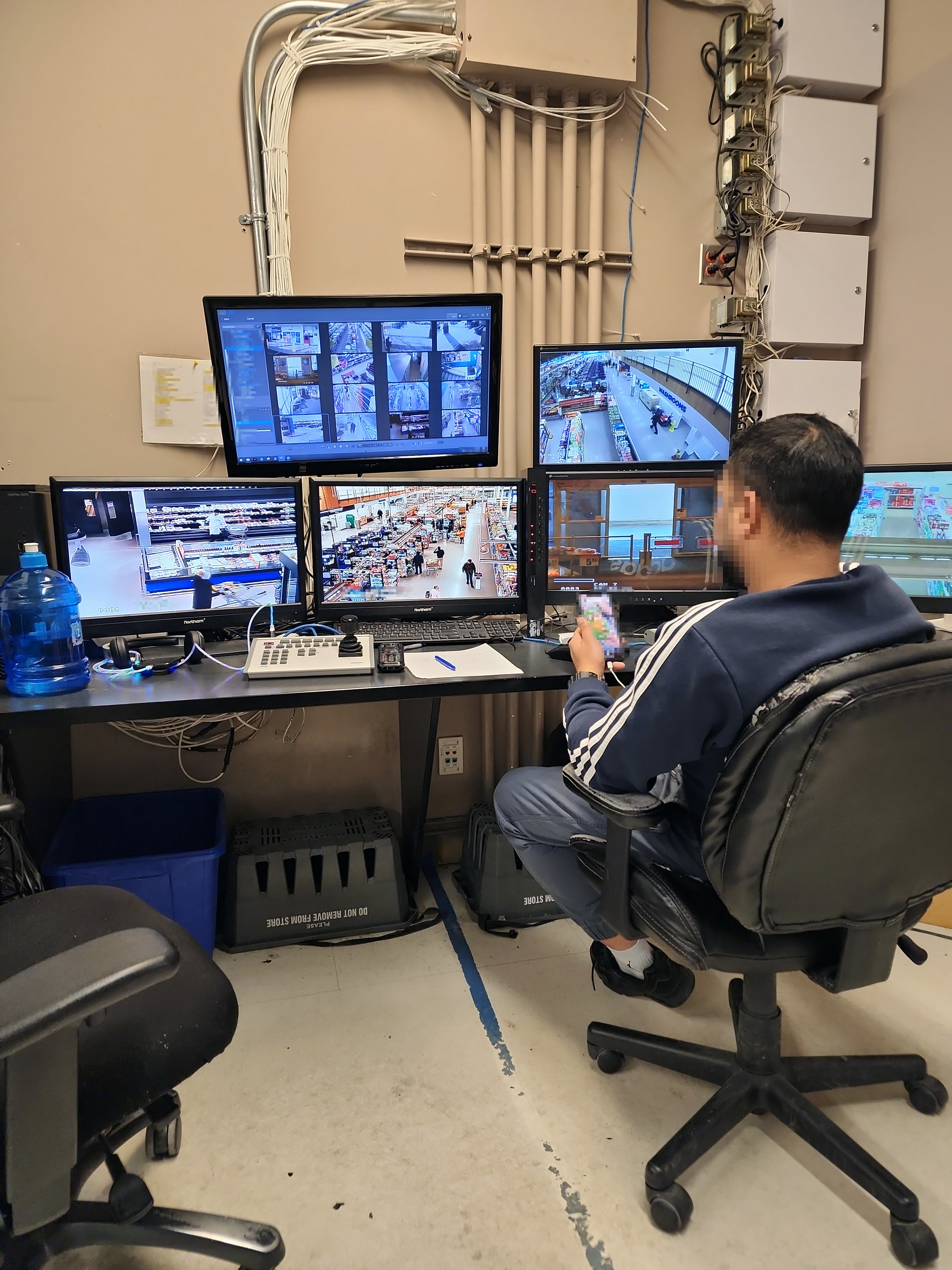
- A store detective monitoring security cameras

Occupation
- Synonyms: asset protection investigator, asset protection specialist, loss prevention detective
- Activity sectors: Law enforcement, Security

Description
- Related jobs: Private investigator, Security guard, Detective

A store detective (also known as asset protection investigator, asset protection specialist, or loss prevention detective) is a person employed by a company as part of their loss prevention or asset protection department. They detect and prevent retail theft, reduce shrink, and help manage the security and safety of a store.

Store detectives detect and prevent theft by monitoring CCTV and patrolling the store in plain clothes to identify individuals who are attempting to shoplift. They also work to find ways to reduce operational and internal shrink through process improvement.

Store detectives are used in many big-box stores and department stores. Some companies, like Target and Macy's, employ both undercover store detectives and uniformed security guards.

== Overview ==
Store detectives may be self-employed on a contract basis, but most are employees of the retailer, a security firm that has an outsourcing arrangement with the retailer, or of an agency with a similar agreement.

The key difference between a store detective and a security guard is that a store detective's role is covert, and usually prioritizes apprehending an individual after they have committed a theft instead of actively deterring theft from taking place. A store detective's job usually involves monitoring the store via CCTV surveillance or physical presence on the sales floor to watch for shoplifters. Most retailers require store detectives to observe an individual enter the store or department, select merchandise, conceal the merchandise they had selected if such is to occur, and attempt to exit the store without making any attempt to purchase the item or items they have selected before intervening. If all of these steps are observed, they may attempt to detain the individual as they exit the store.

Laws vary greatly from jurisdiction to jurisdiction regarding how a suspect may be detained or arrested. In Canada, detectives may perform a Citizen's arrest on an individual, utilizing powers given to them by the Criminal Code. In the United States, shopkeeper's privilege laws that allow the detainment of shoplifters often vary by state. Store detectives often work closely with local law enforcement to help apprehend shoplifters and prevent theft.

It is standard practice that stores require their detectives to have stable work histories and no criminal record. Common backgrounds include the armed services, fire and rescue services, security and policing. In the UK, distance learning courses in store detection are offered by many organizations and the store detective must be in receipt of an SIA (Security Industry Agency) license. Training in security management studies is available from numerous training providers at various levels. In the US, many states require store detectives to be licensed security officers.

== Additional responsibilities ==
Many retail companies assign the task of investigating check and credit card fraud activity as well as internal or employee theft activity to the store detective. Companies sometimes also assign the store detective the task of searching employee lockers and bags at random.

== Techniques ==
Keen observational skills, the use of CCTV, and the ability to "blend in" with regular shoppers can help a store detective to identify individuals engaged in potential theft. Store detectives are also expected to have a clear understanding of the law as it applies to their role.

Most store detectives are unarmed. Some are trained in arrest and restraint techniques, depending on the policies of their employer and local laws. In the late 2010s, many retailers began adopting a "hands-off" policy barring store detectives from physically restraining individuals suspected of shoplifting.

== In popular culture ==
- The 2012 TruTV reality series Caught Red Handed follows contracted loss prevention officers.
- In the 2021 comedy film Queenpins, Paul Walter Hauser portrays a corporate loss prevention officer for a grocery chain who pursues a pair of women running a coupon scam ring.
- In the 1980 film Stir Crazy, Gene Wilder portrays a store detective who gets fired after falsely accusing a woman of shoplifting.

== See also ==
- Hotel detective
- Retail loss prevention
- Security guard
