= Citizen's arrest =

Arrest made by a private citizen

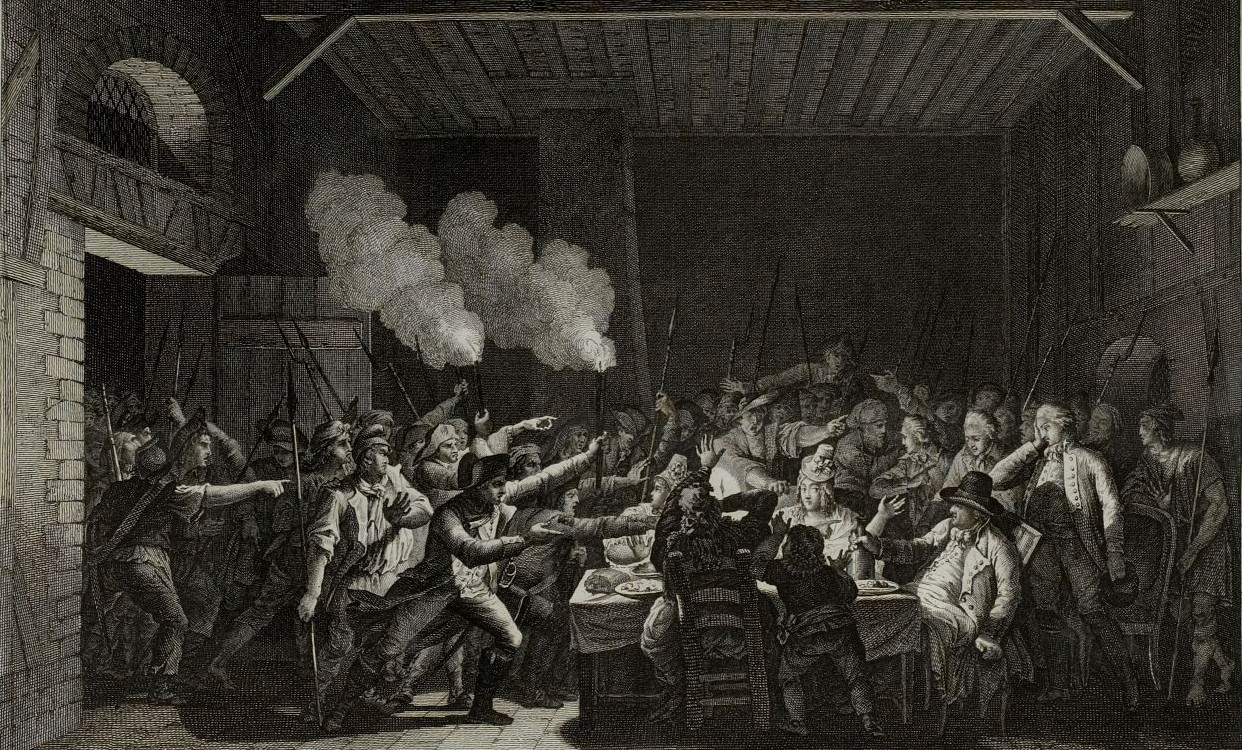
Louis XVI arrested during his Flight to Varennes in 1791

A citizen's arrest is an arrest made by a private citizen – a person who is not acting as a sworn law-enforcement official. In common law jurisdictions, the practice dates back to medieval England and the English common law, in which sheriffs encouraged ordinary citizens to help apprehend law breakers.

== Legal and political aspects ==
Anyone who makes a citizen's arrest can find themselves facing possible lawsuits or criminal charges (e.g. charges of false imprisonment, unlawful restraint, kidnapping, or wrongful arrest) if the wrong person is apprehended or a suspect's civil rights are violated. This is especially true when police forces are attempting to determine who an aggressor is. Private citizens do not enjoy the same immunity from civil liability when making arrests on other private citizens as police officers do.

The level of responsibility that a person performing a citizen's arrest may bear depends on the jurisdiction. For instance, in France and Germany, a person stopping a criminal from committing a crime, including crimes against belongings, is not criminally responsible as long as the means employed are in proportion to the threat. In both countries, this results from a different legal norm, "aid to others in immediate danger", which is concerned with prevention, not prosecution, of crimes.

== Laws by region ==
=== Australia ===
In Australia, the power to arrest is granted by both federal and state legislation; however, the exact power granted differs depending on jurisdiction. The power to arrest for a federal offence is granted by section 3Z of the Crimes Act 1914. Under the Act, a person who is not a police constable may, without warrant, arrest another person if they believe on reasonable grounds that:

- the other person is committing or has just committed an indictable offence; and
- proceedings by summons against the other person would not: ensure the appearance of the person before a court in respect of the offence; prevent a repetition or continuation of the offence or the commission of another offence; prevent the concealment, loss or destruction of evidence relating to the offence; prevent harassment of, or interference with, a person who may be required to give evidence in proceedings in respect of the offence; prevent the fabrication of evidence in respect of the offence; or would not preserve the safety or welfare of the person.

A person who arrests another person must, as soon as practicable after the arrest, arrange for the other person, and any property found on the other person, to be delivered into the custody of a constable.

Generally speaking, as regards the law in Australia: Where it is clear on the evidence that a private citizen, or security officer, in detaining a suspect, acted reasonably and the suspect unreasonably, then it is likely that the court will find in favour of the citizen or security officer and against the suspect if that suspect chooses, later, to sue the citizen for assault or false imprisonment. In other circumstances where, e.g. a property owner (or an agent) arrests a thief in a manner, and in circumstances, disproportionate to the likely harm to the victim, and in clear defiance of the rights of the suspect (for example, to be taken forthwith to a police station), then the court is very likely to find in favour of the suspect (guilty or otherwise). The courts may order compensation for such suspects in appropriate circumstances.

==== New South Wales ====
In the Australian state of New South Wales, the power to arrest is granted to anyone who is not a police officer by section 100 of the Law Enforcement (Powers and Responsibilities) Act 2002 (NSW). Under the Act, a person may, without a warrant, arrest another person if:

- the person is in the act of committing an offence under any Act or statutory instrument, or
- the person has just committed any such offence, or
- the person has committed a serious indictable offence for which the person has not been tried.

Section 231 of the Act allows the use of such force as is "reasonably necessary to make the arrest or to prevent the escape of the person after arrest". A person who arrests another person under section 100 must, as soon as is reasonably practicable, take the person, and any property found on the person, before a magistrate to be dealt with according to law. The magistrate will also decide whether or not the force applied in making the arrest was reasonable under the circumstances.

According to the Law Society of New South Wales, the arresting person should:

- inform the person that they are under arrest and
- inform the person of the reasons for the arrest.

==== Queensland ====
In the Australian state of Queensland, the power to arrest is granted by section 546 of Schedule 1 to the Criminal Code Act 1899 (Qld). Under the Act, any person who finds another committing an offence may, without warrant, arrest the other person. The power to arrest in Queensland also allows for arrest on suspicion of an offence:

If the offence has been actually committed–it is lawful for any person who believes on reasonable ground that another person has committed the offence to arrest that person without warrant, whether that other person has committed the offence or not.

Section 260 of the Act also provides a power to arrest in preventing a breach of the peace:

It is lawful for any person who witnesses a breach of the peace to interfere to prevent the continuance or renewal of it, and to use such force as is reasonably necessary for such prevention and is reasonably proportioned to the danger to be apprehended from such continuance or renewal, and to detain any person who is committing or who is about to join in or to renew the breach of the peace for such time as may be reasonably necessary in order to give the person into the custody of a police officer.

Following the arrest, the person arrested must, without delay, be handed over to a justice of the peace or police officer, in accordance with section 552 of the Criminal Code. Legal advice should then be sought to avoid any possible legal action for wrongful arrest, false imprisonment or assault.

==== South Australia ====
Section 271 of the Criminal Law Consolidation Act 1935 (SA) grants arrest powers to a person in South Australia.

s271(3): A person is liable to arrest and detention under this section if the person is in the act of committing, or has just committed an indictable offence; or theft (whether the theft is a summary or indictable offence); or an offence against the person (whether the offence is summary or indictable); or an offence involving interference with, damage to or destruction of property (whether the offence is summary or indictable).

==== Tasmania ====
Under the Police Offences Act 1935 (Tas), section 55(3), any person may arrest any other person whom they find committing an offence, where they have reasonable grounds to believe that the conduct will create or may involve substantial injury to another person, serious danger of such injury, loss of property or serious injury to property. Section 55(5) states "For the purposes of this section, a person is said to be 'found offending' if he does any act, or makes any omission, or conducts or behaves himself, and thereby causes a person who finds him reasonable grounds for believing that he has, in respect of such act, omission, or conduct, committed an offence against this Act." There are further provisions in section 301 of the Criminal Code Act 1924 (Tas) that appear to allow a sliding scale of force in executing an arrest.

==== Victoria ====
In the Australian state of Victoria, the power to arrest is granted in section 458 of the Crimes Act 1958 (Vic). It states that a person may, without a warrant, arrest a person that they find committing an offence for one or more of the following reasons:

- to ensure the appearance of the offender in court, and/or
- to preserve public order, and/or
- to prevent the continuation or repetition of the offence, or the commission of a further offence, and/or
- for the safety or welfare of the public or the offender.

A person may also arrest another person if they are instructed to do so by a member of the police force, or if they believe on reasonable grounds that the offender is escaping legal custody.

Section 461 states that if an arrest is made under section 458 of the Crimes Act, and is later proven to be false, then the arrest itself will not be considered unlawful if it was made on reasonable grounds. Section 462A allows any person the right to use force "not disproportionate to the objective as he believes on reasonable grounds to be necessary to prevent the commission, continuance or completion of an indictable offence or to effect or assist in effecting the lawful arrest of a person committing or suspected of committing any offence".

==== Western Australia ====
It was only in 2004 that the Western Australian parliament repealed the provisions of the former section 47 of the Police Act 1892 which allowed any person to arrest without a warrant "any reputed common prostitute, thief, loose, idle or disorderly person, who, within view of such person apprehending, shall offend against this Act, and shall forthwith deliver him to any constable or police officer of the place where he shall have been apprehended, to be taken and conveyed before a Justice, to be dealt with according to law ..." A private citizen would have found it rather difficult to interpret the terms "loose" or "idle" with any degree of legal certainty. Citizen's arrest powers are now in section 25 of the Criminal Investigation Act 2006 (WA).

==== The Territories ====
Northern Territory
Under section 441(2) of the Criminal Code of the Northern Territory, any person can arrest another whom (s)he finds committing an offence or behaving such that he or she believes on reasonable grounds that the offender has committed an offence and that an arrest is necessary for a range of specified reasons.

Australian Capital Territory
See the Crimes Act 1900 (ACT), section 218, which permits a citizen's arrest.

=== Austria ===
In Austria, citizen's arrests (Anhalterecht Privater) can be made under § 80 Abs 2 StPO (code of penal procedures). The person making the arrest is allowed to hold the arrestee solely for the purpose of turning him over to a proper legal authority such as the police.

=== Brazil ===
In Brazil, a Federal law allows any person to arrest a suspect criminal found in flagrante delicto or fleeing from the crime scene. The person has to, at his/her own judgment, have the physical power to keep the suspect detained, has to verbally explain what (s)he is doing to the arrestee and has to call the police. Both have to wait for the arrival of the police. The person who makes a citizen's arrest has to sign the police forms as a witness and explain the facts. Typically it will lead to a time burden of at least two hours. If the facts cannot be verified the person who realizes the citizen's arrest might be sued by the arrestee.

=== Canada ===
==== Federal law ====
Canada's blanket arrest authorities for crimes or violations of federal statutes are found in the Criminal Code. In Canada, a criminal offence is any offence that is created by a federal statute—there are no "provincial crimes".

Criminal offences are divided into three groups: indictable, dual procedure, and summary conviction. For the purposes of arrest, dual procedure offences are considered to be indictable.

The Criminal Code provisions related to citizen arrests were changed in 2012, by the Citizen's Arrest and Self-defence Act. As a consequence, it is now possible to make a citizen's arrest in Canada in circumstances where a "reasonable" amount of time has lapsed between the commission of a property-related offence and the arrest.

CRIMINAL CODE
Arrest without warrant by any person

494. (1) Any one may arrest without warrant

- (a) a person whom he finds committing an indictable offence; or
- (b) a person who, on reasonable grounds, he believes
  - (i) has committed a criminal offence, and
  - (ii) is escaping from and freshly pursued by persons who have lawful authority to arrest that person.

Arrest by owner, etc., of property

(2) The owner or a person in lawful possession of property, or a person authorized by the owner or by a person in lawful possession of property, may arrest a person without a warrant if they find them committing a criminal offence on or in relation to that property and

- (a) they make the arrest at that time; or
- (b) they make the arrest within a reasonable time after the offence is committed and they believe on reasonable grounds that it is not feasible in the circumstances for a peace officer to make the arrest.

Delivery to peace officer
(3) Any one other than a peace officer who arrests a person without warrant shall forthwith deliver the person to a peace officer.

For greater certainty
(4) For greater certainty, a person who is authorized to make an arrest under this section is a person who is authorized by law to do so for the purposes of section 25.

==== Provincial law ====
There are several arrest authorities found through the various provincial statutes. The most notable citizen's arrest authority in Ontario is found in the Trespass to Property Act, but there are others found in the Highway Traffic Act, the Liquor Licence Act, and many others.

TRESPASS TO PROPERTY ACT
Arrest without warrant on premises
9. (1) A police officer, or the occupier of premises, or a person authorized by the occupier may arrest without warrant any person he or she believes on reasonable and probable grounds to be on the premises in contravention of section 2.

Delivery to police officer
(2) Where the person who makes an arrest under subsection (1) is not a police officer, he or she shall promptly call for the assistance of a police officer and give the person arrested into the custody of the police officer.

=== China ===
Chinese criminal procedure law empowers any citizen to make citizen's arrest:

Article 82. Under any of the following circumstances, a person may be immediately taken by any citizen to a public security authority, a people's procuratorate, or a people's court for handling:

- (1) the person is committing a crime or is discovered immediately after committing a crime;
- (2) the person is wanted;
- (3) the person has escaped from incarceration; and
- (4) the person is being pursued for capture.

=== Czech Republic ===
In the Czech Republic, pursuant to § 76 (2) of the Code of Criminal Procedure ("Zákon č. 141/1961 Sb. o trestním řízení soudním (trestní řád)"), the personal liberty of a person caught in the act of committing a crime or immediately afterwards may be restricted by anyone if necessary to establish the person's identity, prevent their escape or secure evidence. The arrester shall, however, be obliged to hand that person over immediately to the police authority; The arrester may also hand over a member of the armed forces to the nearest armed forces unit or garrison administrator. If such a person cannot be handed over immediately, the restriction of that person's personal liberty shall be notified without delay to one of those authorities.

=== Denmark ===
In Denmark, pursuant to § 755 (2) of the Administration of Justice Act, anyone may arrest a person caught in the act of committing a crime or in direct connection to a crime if the criminal act is subject to public prosecution. The arrestee must as soon as possible be turned over to the police with information about the time of and reasons for the arrest.

=== Ethiopia ===
In Ethiopia, any private person may arrest without warrant a person who has committed a flagrant offence as defined in Art. 19 and 20 of the Criminal Procedure Code where the offence is punishable with simple imprisonment for not less than three months. In addition where the police call for assistance in making an arrest with or without warrant there shall be a duty to assist where assistance can be given without risk. The Criminal Procedure Code also provides that where an arrest is made the person making the arrest shall without unnecessary delay hand over the person so arrested to the nearest police station.

=== Finland ===
In Finland, Coercive Measures Act 22.7.2011/806 gives a right to apprehend someone in the act of committing a crime (in flagrante delicto) or fleeing from the crime scene, if punishment for the crime might be imprisonment or the crime is petty assault, petty theft, petty embezzlement, petty unauthorized use, petty stealing of a motor vehicle for temporary use, petty damage to property or petty fraud. A person wanted by the police (arrest warrant) can be apprehended by anyone. After the apprehension, the detainee must be handed over to the police as soon as possible. If the criminal is resisting or tries to escape, the law gives a citizen the right to use an amount of force considered necessary, when considering the nature of the crime, the behavior of the apprehended and the situation as a whole.

=== France ===
French law allows any civilian to arrest a person caught in flagrante delicto committing a felony or misdemeanor punishable by a jail sentence, with the obligation to immediately bring that person before the nearest officer of the police judiciaire. In modern practice, one would detain the perpetrator and immediately call the nearest police, then hand over the perpetrator and any evidence to the first police officers to arrive at the scene. Use of force is not authorised.

=== Georgia ===
Article 29 of the Georgian Penal Code provides that "A person shall not be considered to have acted unlawfully if he/she seizes the offender to bring him/her before public authorities without exceeding the measures required for this purpose. Exceeding the measures required for seizing an offender shall mean clear incompatibility of this measure with the gravity of the crime committed by the person to be seized and the circumstances relating to seizure."

=== Germany ===
Citizen's arrests (in German: Jedermann-Anhalte- und -Festnahmerecht) can be made under § 127 I 1 StPO (code of penal procedures) if the arrestee is caught in flagrante delicto and either the identity of the person cannot be otherwise established immediately or they are suspected to try to flee. The person making the arrest is allowed to hold the arrestee solely for the purpose of turning them over to a proper legal authority such as the police. German law does not establish that the crime has to be serious, nor that the person making the arrest has to actually be a citizen of Germany. The use of force is authorized, but the force must be proportional (verhältnismäßig) to the circumstances and the suspected crime.

=== Hong Kong ===
Citizen's arrest is known as the "101 power". Under the Criminal Procedure Ordinance (cap. 221 of the Laws of Hong Kong), section 101(2) provides that "Any person may arrest without warrant any person whom he may reasonably suspect of being guilty of an arrestable offence" using "force as is reasonable and proportionate in the circumstances". Once an arrest is made, the suspect must be delivered to a police office as soon as possible for court proceedings. "Arrestable offence" is defined as any crimes that can be sentenced for more than 12 months of jail time.

=== Hungary ===
According to article 273 of Act XC. of 2017 concerning Penal Procedure, anyone may arrest a person caught committing a felony, but is obliged to hand the person over to the "investigative authorities" immediately; if this is not possible, the police must be informed.

=== India ===
Section 40, of the Bharatiya Nagarik Suraksha Sanhita states that:

1. Any private person may arrest or cause to be arrested any person who in his presence commits a non-bailable and cognizable offence, or any proclaimed offender, and, without unnecessary delay, but within six hours from such arrest, shall make over or cause to be made over any person so arrested to a police officer, or, in the absence of a police officer, take such person or cause him to be taken in custody to the nearest police station.
2. If there is reason to believe that such person comes under the provisions of sub-section (1) of section 35, a police officer shall take him in custody.
3. If there is reason to believe that he has committed a non-cognizable offence, and he refuses on the demand of a police officer to give his name and residence, or gives a name or residence which such officer has reason to believe to be false, he shall be dealt with under the provisions of section 39; but if there is no sufficient reason to believe that he has committed any offence, he shall be at once released

According to this section any private person may arrest or cause to be arrested

1. A person committing a non bailable and cognizable offence in his presence or
2. Any proclaimed offender he shall without unnecessary delay take such person over to a police officer or to the nearest police station.

=== Iran ===
The Code of Criminal Procedure allows private citizens to detain those suspected of crimes in order to prevent their escape, so long as the crime in question is on the list of crimes subjected to citizens' arrest, the crime is evident, and law enforcement is absent from the scene.

=== Ireland ===
The term "citizen's arrest" is colloquially used for arrest, without an arrest warrant, made by someone other than a member of the Garda Síochána. Despite the colloquial name, non-Irish citizens have performed such arrests. The law of the Republic of Ireland, being derived from English law, inherited the common law power for private individuals to arrest for felony or breach of the peace. The Criminal Law Act 1997 abolished the common-law distinction between felonies and misdemeanours and instead distinguishes "arrestable" and "non-arrestable" offences; arrestable offences are those punishable by at least five years' imprisonment, and private individuals may arrest those in flagrante, having committed, or about to commit an arrestable offence.

Several other statutes which define offences likewise state "any person may arrest" someone committing the offence; relevant offences include making off without payment, hawking revenue stamps, and property damage — this last permits arrest for a past crime as well as one in progress. In addition, the Criminal Law (Jurisdiction) Act 1976 schedules offences associated with the Troubles in Northern Ireland, and authorises anyone to arrest someone for committing or having committed such an offence, whether in the Republic of Ireland or Northern Ireland. The 1976 act, and a similar Westminster act giving reciprocal extraterritorial jurisdiction, obviated the need for extradition between the jurisdictions, which would have been more controversial.

If the arrester lacks reasonable cause to believe the arrested person to have committed the offence, the latter may sue the former for defamation, wrongful arrest, or trespass. For most offences, a private individual can only make such an arrest if the suspect would otherwise evade arrest by a Garda, and the arrester must surrender the suspect to Garda custody as soon as practicable. An exception is that stamp hawkers must be brought before the District Court. Citizen's arrests are rare; most often they are made by store detectives on shoplifting suspects.

=== Israel ===
An Israeli law allowing anyone to arrest a suspect whom they witnessed carrying out a felony was repealed in 1996 and replaced by a new law allowing the detention of a suspect by another person under certain conditions. Section 75 of the Criminal Procedure Law (Enforcement Powers – Arrest) of 1996 allows anyone to detain a person who is witnessed carrying out certain suspected crimes. The crimes include the following: a felony, theft, a crime of violence and a crime which has caused serious damage to property. A person using these detention powers may use reasonable force if their request is not met as long as they do not cause the suspect bruising. They must hand the suspect over to the police immediately and no later than three hours. A citizen's arrest cannot be performed on persons whose identity is known or who are not suspected of fleeing. The law can be used by both private individuals and private security.

=== Italy ===
Any private citizen can, according to article 383 of the Italian Code of Criminal Procedure, arrest another person, provided they are caught "in flagranza di reato" (In flagrante delicto) and the felony they are caught committing includes mandatory arrest from the police and is "perseguibile d'ufficio", meaning that the judicial authority, once received the "notitia criminis" (a crime report), has the duty to commence prosecution, without a party necessarily filing a complaint. The person making the arrest is legally required to hand to police the arrested person and the corpus delicti to the judicial authority, failure to do so could result in the person making the arrest committing a crime.

=== Japan ===
In Japan, Section 213 of the Code of Criminal Procedure allows anyone from civilians to firefighters witnessing any crime in progress to make an arrest. This is called genkouhan (現行犯, meaning in flagrante delicto). Most criminals who attempt to flee, or refuse to identify themselves, can be held until police arrive. However, making a citizen's arrest to prevent petty crime (e.g. illegal assembly, accidental injury, accidental trespass, defamation of character, leaving a parking lot without paying) is false imprisonment per Section 220 of the Criminal Code.

=== Latvia ===
Criminal Procedure Law in Latvia gives a right to any person to apprehend someone in the act of committing a crime (in flagrante delicto) or fleeing from the crime scene, if punishment for the crime might be imprisonment. Also a person wanted by the police, for whom there is an arrest warrant, can be arrested by anyone at any time. A person stopping a criminal from committing a crime is not criminally responsible as long as the means employed are in proportion to the threat. The arrested person must be handed over to the police immediately.

CRIMINAL PROCEDURE LAW
Section 265. Detention Procedures
(3) If there is a clear connection between a person and a committed criminal offence regarding which a punishment related to the deprivation of liberty may be applied, and such person is located at the location where the criminal offence was committed or flees from such site, or if a search for the person regarding the committing of such criminal offence has been announced, such person may be detained by anyone and shall immediately be transferred to the nearest police employee.

THE CRIMINAL LAW Section 31. Detention Causing Personal Harm

- (1) Detention causing personal harm is an act which is directed against such person as is committing or has committed a criminal offence. Criminal liability for this act shall not apply if the harm allowed to be effected to the person is not evidently disproportionate to the character of the offence, non-compliance or resistance.
- (2) A person who, in carrying out detention, has violated conditions regarding the detention, shall be liable for violating such conditions.
- (3) If the acts by which harm has been caused to the person to be detained have not been necessary for his or her arrest, liability on a general basis applies for the harm caused.
- (4) The causing of harm to the detained person through negligence shall not be criminally punishable.

=== Malaysia ===
Section 27(1) of the Criminal Procedure Code allows for a private person to arrest a person who, in his view, has committed a seizable offence or a non-bailable offence:

Any private person may arrest any person who, in his view, commits a non-bailable and seizable offence or who has been proclaimed under section 44 and shall without unnecessary delay hand over the person so arrested to the nearest police officer or, in the absence of a police officer, take that person to the nearest police station.

Sub-section 5 further allows the arrest of a person who commits an offence on or with respect to the property of another by any person who is using the property to which the injury is done, or by the servant of either of those persons or by any person authorized by or acting in aid of either of those persons:

Any person who commits an offence on or with respect to the property of another may if his name and address are unknown be apprehended by the person injured or by any person who is using the property to which the injury is done, or by the servant of either of those persons or by any person authorized by or acting in aid of either of those persons, and may be detained until he gives his name and address and satisfies such person that the name and address so given are correct or until he can be delivered into the custody of a police officer.

A "seizable offence" is defined as an offence in which a police officer may ordinarily arrest without warrant as per defined by the Code.

=== Mexico ===
Article 16 of the 1917 Constitution of Mexico allows any person to arrest a criminal found in flagrante delicto. A non-police officer doing so must immediately bring them to the nearest civil authority. A person who fails to do so may be found guilty of illegal deprivation of liberty, a crime similar to kidnapping that can result in a prison sentence for the perpetrator. In 2006, the celebrity bounty hunter Duane 'Dog' Chapman was charged with unlawful deprivation of liberty for arresting an American fugitive in Mexico and attempting to take him across the border to California without consulting police.

=== Nepal ===
Section 9(8) of The National Criminal Procedure (Code) Act, 2017 states : "If the police is not available for the time being at the time of commission of any offence, any person who is present at the time of commission of that offence or who is eye witness thereto may prevent the person committing such offence from going away or escaping and hand him or her over to the nearby police office."

=== New Zealand ===
In New Zealand, some legal protection exists to those making a citizen's arrest as provided in the Crimes Act 1961 in that there may be justification or protection from criminal responsibility. Justification of the arrest ensures the arresting person is not guilty of an offence and is not liable to any civil proceeding. Protection from criminal responsibility means those who make the arrest are not liable to any criminal proceedings. They are however liable for civil proceedings. The legislation is carefully worded and only applies to offences covered in the Crimes Act 1961, not other offences such as those covered in the Summary Offences Act 1981.

Specifically, the Crimes Act 1961 states that everyone (not just New Zealand citizens) is justified in arresting without warrant:

- Any person found committing any offence against this Act which the maximum punishment is not less than 3 years' imprisonment; or
- Any person found at night (9pm till 6am) committing any offence against this Act.

Other situations where members of the public are protected from criminal responsibility when involved in arresting where:

- They have been asked by a police officer to help arrest any person believed or suspected to have committed any offence unless they know that there is no reasonable ground for the belief or suspicion.
- They witness a breach of the peace, and therefore are justified in interfering to prevent its continuance or renewal, and may detain any person committing it, in order to hand them over to a police officer provided that the person interfering does not use more force than is reasonably necessary to prevent the continuance or renewal of the breach of the peace, or than is reasonably proportionate to the danger to be apprehended from its continuance or renewal. Similar legislation applies to suppressions of riots by members of the public.
- They believe, on reasonable and probable grounds, someone has committed an offence against the Crimes Act 1961 and is fleeing and is being pursued by any one they believe can arrest that person for the offence (such as a police officer). This applies whether or not the offence has in fact been committed, and whether or not the arrested person committed it.
- The person making the arrest is entitled to perform a search on the suspect, provided (s)he is not working for the place of arrest (e.g. a security guard in a hospital).

In all cases a person making a citizens arrest must hand over the suspect to a police officer at the earliest possible time.

=== Nigeria ===
The Administration of Criminal Justice Act (2015) allows private citizens to arrest a person who commits a criminal offense in their presence or a person who they reasonably suspect of having committed a crime for which a police officer would be legally entitled to arrest them without a warrant. Property owners are entitled to arrest those found damaging their private property and to authorize people working for them to arrest anyone damaging their property as well. Anyone damaging public property may be arrested by a private citizen. Private citizens who make arrests are legally obligated to immediately hand over the suspect to a police officer, or, in the absence of a police officer, to turn the suspect over to the nearest police station. After turning in the suspect, the private person who made the arrest must give a formal witness statement on the circumstances of the arrest.

=== Norway ===
In Norway, pursuant to § 176 of the Criminal Procedure Act any person may arrest a suspect caught at the scene or pursued from it. The arrestee must be handed over to the police immediately.

=== Peru ===
The Code of Criminal Procedure allows private citizens to arrest persons caught in flagrante delicto in the commission of a crime. Private citizens who make an arrest are obligated to immediately turn over the detainee to the police.

=== Philippines ===
In the Philippines, this provision is supported by the Revised Penal Code, which allows any person to arrest another when an offense has occurred and the person making the arrest has reasonable ground to believe that the person to be arrested has committed it.

Barangay officials, particularly tanods, play a crucial role in local governance and community safety, often acting as first responders in incidents within their jurisdiction. Their authority to conduct an arrest without a warrant is derived from specific conditions stipulated in Philippine law. These include instances when the person to be arrested has committed, is actually committing, or is attempting to commit an offense in their presence. This is aligned with Rule 113 of the Rules of Court, which governs warrantless arrests.

Moreover, Barangay officials must adhere to proper legal procedures when performing a warrantless arrest. This includes the immediate turnover of the arrested person to the nearest police station or judicial authority within a prescribed period. This protocol ensures that the rights of the arrested individual are safeguarded, including the right to legal counsel and the right against self-incrimination.

It is imperative that Barangay officials also respect the principles of proportionality and necessity, avoiding excessive force and ensuring the dignity of the person arrested is maintained throughout the process. The emphasis should be on de-escalation and ensuring public safety, rather than punitive measures.

Citizen's arrest and the role of Barangay officials in warrantless arrests are integral to the Philippine legal system, providing mechanisms for community involvement in law enforcement while ensuring that legal standards and human rights are upheld. However, it is essential that both citizens and officials understand the legal boundaries and responsibilities involved in such actions to prevent abuse and potential legal repercussions.https://www.respicio.ph/commentaries/legal-framework-for-citizens-arrest-and-the-role-of-barangay-officials-in-the-philippines

=== Poland ===
In Poland anyone has the right to apprehend a person caught in the act of committing an offence, or seized in a pursuit undertaken directly following the commission of an offence, if it is feared that such person may go into hiding or if his identity cannot be established. The apprehended person should be surrendered to the police without delay.

=== Portugal ===
In Portugal one is not civilly liable for restraining another person as long as one has used proportional force in order to defend themselves or someone else or anyone's property, under Articles 336, 337 and 339 of the Portuguese Civil Code (self defense, necessity and alike), and as long as there is an impossibility to resort to law enforcement. The main requirement of proportionality is that one does not give way to property rights over personal rights, the latter prevailing at all costs. There is also an exception to the proportionality principle which applies when, even though the defensive violence was excessive, it was triggered by a legitimate fear of the offended.

With regards to the criminal aspects of the citizen's arrest, Article 255 of the Portuguese Code of Criminal Procedure gives any person the right to detain another in flagrante delicto if and only if the latter's conduct in question is punishable with imprisonment by law and the criminal procedure does not require private complaint, and no law enforcement authority is available in due time. The arrester must immediately bring the detainee into the custody of law enforcement.

=== Russia ===
In Russia, any person is allowed to arrest someone in the act of committing a crime pursuant to articles 37 and 38 of the Criminal Code of Russia and the Ruling of the Plenum of the Supreme Court of Russia of 27 September 2012 if the person performing the arrest is certain that the arrestee has committed a crime. The arrest must be carried out with applying as little force as required for the apprehension and the arrestee should be surrendered to the police without delay.

=== Serbia ===
In Serbia anybody can arrest somebody in the act of committing a crime that the arrested would otherwise be pursued after in official capacity, provided that the police are notified.

=== Singapore ===
Under section 66(1) of the Criminal Procedure Code, a citizen's arrest may be performed under two conditions: that the offense must have been committed in the view or presence of the individual making the arrest, and that the offense must be an arrestable and non-bailable offense (an offense for which a police officer may make an arrest without a warrant). Additionally, a citizen's arrest may be performed even for an arrestable and non-bailable offense against anyone who commits an offense against the individual making the arrest or their property, provided that the name and residential address of the offender are not known. Anyone who performs a citizen's arrest must hand over the arrested person to the police without delay.

=== Spain ===
In Spain, any person is allowed to arrest someone trying to commit a crime or already in the act of committing a crime or a fugitive as described in article 490 of the Criminal Procedure Law, and must be delivered to a judge within 24 hours (article 496).

=== Sweden ===
In Sweden, any person may arrest someone in the act of committing a crime, or fleeing from the crime scene, if the crime committed is punishable by imprisonment. A person wanted by the police, for whom there is an arrest warrant, can be arrested by anyone at any time. After the arrest, the police must be contacted as soon as possible.

Security guards and others working with preventing crime but are not police officers, have this law as justification to arrest thieves and other they encounter. It is enough that imprisonment is mentioned by law as possible punishment for the crime, it does not have to be the likely punishment for what was done, such as low value theft or fraud.

=== Switzerland ===
According to the Swiss Criminal Procedure Code § 218, private individuals have the right to arrest a person when there is insufficient time to obtain police assistance, provided that

1. they have caught the person in the act of committing a felony or misdemeanour or they have encountered the person immediately after committing such an offence; or
2. the public have been requested to assist in tracing of the person concerned.

When making an arrest, private individuals may only use force as a last resort and any force used must be reasonable. Arrested persons must be handed over to the police as quickly as possible.

=== Taiwan ===
An arrest without a warrant is explicitly forbidden by the Article 8 in the Constitution of the Republic of China, "except in case of flagrante delicto as provided by law", as shown below:

The Code of Criminal Procedure
Article 88: Arrest without a Warrant

- A person in flagrante delicto may be arrested without a warrant by any person.
- A person in flagrante delicto is a person who is discovered in the act of committing an offense or immediately thereafter.
- A person is considered to be in flagrante delicto under one of the following circumstances:
  - (1) One is pursued with cries that he is an offender;
  - (2) One is found in possession of a weapon, stolen property, or other items sufficient to warrant a suspicion that he is an offender or his body, clothes and the like show traces of the commission of an offense sufficient to warrant such suspicion.

However, the first additional circumstance, i.e. "pursued with cries" has been considered ambiguous in recent years, leading to many ongoing discussions and controversies of whether this would cause an infringement of the personal freedom.

=== Turkey ===
Turkish Criminal Procedure Code states:

Article 90 – (1) In the instances listed below, any individual is entitled to make an arrest of another person temporarily without a warrant:

- a) If the other person was seen committing an offense,
- b) If the other person was under pursuit after committing an offense, if there is the possibility of escape of the person under pursuit after committing an offense or, if the establishment of his identity right away is not possible.

=== United Kingdom ===
==== England and Wales ====
A citizen's arrest can be lawfully carried out on any person under section 24A of the Police and Criminal Evidence Act 1984 for an indictable offence (which by virtue of the Interpretation Act 1978 includes an either way offence), but with some exceptions listed below.

A few examples of indictable and either way offences are theft, criminal damage, sexual assault, burglary, assault occasioning actual bodily harm, possession of an offensive weapon in a public place, and possession of a controlled substance. Further examples of either-way offences are listed under Schedule 1 of the Magistrates Court Act 1980. It is thus permissible for any person to arrest without warrant:

- anyone who is in the act of committing an indictable offence, or whom the arrestor has reasonable grounds for suspecting to be in the act of committing an offence, or
- where an indictable offence has been committed, anyone who is guilty of that offence or whom the arrestor has reasonable grounds for suspecting to be guilty of it.

However, both of following two conditions must also be satisfied:

- it appears to the person making the arrest that it is not reasonably practicable for a (police) constable to make the arrest instead, and
- the arrestor has reasonable grounds for believing that the arrest is necessary to prevent one or more of the following:
  - the person causing physical injury to themself or others,
  - the person suffering physical injury,
  - the person causing loss of or damage to property, or
  - the person absconding before a constable can assume responsibility for them.

Where an arrest is made after an offence has been committed, the person who makes the arrest must actually know, not simply suspect that an offence has actually been committed. If it later turns out that an offence had not been committed (which will often be found to be the case when the defendant is acquitted), such an arrest would be unlawful.

"Any person" powers can be used to arrest before an offence occurs as long as the offence in question falls within the Criminal Attempts Act 1981. This act creates the offence of an attempted offence, as long as the offence being attempted is an indictable. For this to apply, the offence must actually be in the process of being attempted—preparatory steps are not sufficient.

A citizen's arrest cannot be made:

- inside a polling station, on a person who commits or is suspected of committing an offence of personation (that is, pretending to be someone else in order to vote in an election); or
- in relation to an offence of stirring up racial hatred or stirring up religious hatred or hatred based on sexual orientation

In addition to an arrest without a warrant, where an arrest warrant is issued by a court, the warrant may name people (other than police officers) who are able to use it to arrest the person against whom it has been issued.

===== Other powers =====
A citizen's arrest is a form of lawful custody and anyone attempting to flee may be guilty of attempting to escape from lawful custody. Furthermore, the offence of assault with intent to resist arrest under Section 38 of the Offences Against the Person Act 1861 may apply if the arrestee assaulted the arrestor, provided the arrest itself is lawful. Both assault with intent to resist arrest/lawful apprehension and escaping from lawful custody are indictable, the former being so by statute, the latter as a common law offence and therefore indictable only. Therefore, these offences, whether fully carried out or merely attempted (an attempt being triable by the same mode as the completed offence), are arrestable in themselves.

A person who is not a constable cannot make a citizen's arrest before an offence takes place. They may, however, use the power provided by section 3 of the Criminal Law Act 1967 to use reasonable force for the prevention of crime or to effect or assist the arrest of a suspected offender. This would not allow a citizen's arrest before an offence takes place in this sense but would allow any person to use reasonable force to prevent an offence from occurring; for example, restraining a person who raised a brick in their hand in order to imminently smash a window. What constitutes a "crime" and hence an "offender" for this purpose was clarified in R v Jones to be any domestic crime in England and Wales, i.e. excluding crimes against international or foreign law. Kent Police have released a brief yet comprehensive guide on reasonable force.

Although not technically citizen's arrest powers, any person also has the power to arrest for a common law breach of the peace which also provides any person with a power of entry.Section 3 Criminal Justice Act 1967 also provides any person the power to apprehend a person unlawfully at large e.g. an offender on a recall to prison or in the circumstances where someone has managed to escape from lawful custody.

Until 2006, there was an "any person" power of arrest under part of the Theft Act 1968 in England and Wales that related to poaching, which was used by private water bailiffs (as opposed to Environment Agency bailiffs). This ceased to have effect as a result of a general repeal of such arrest powers by the Serious Organised Crime and Police Act 2005. An officer or agent of certain companies may seize and detain any person who has committed an offence against the provisions of the Companies Clauses Consolidation Act 1845 whose name and residence shall be but unknown to such officer or agent, and take them before a justice of the peace, who "shall proceed with all convenient dispatch to the hearing and determining of the complaint against such offender". In Northern Ireland in 2007, this power was restricted to only the company's officers.

Under the Standing Orders of the House of Commons of the United Kingdom, the Serjeant at Arms has the power to take into custody any member of the public who is in a Members-only area of the House, or who misconducts themselves, or who fails to leave when the House sits in private.

Court security officers in England and Wales have the additional power to restrain and remove persons from court buildings under section 53 of the Courts Act 2003, as well as powers of search and seizure of certain articles.

==== Northern Ireland ====
Similar provisions apply to Northern Ireland as to England and Wales, implemented through the Police and Criminal Evidence (Northern Ireland) Order 1989 (SI 1989/1341) as amended by the Police and Criminal Evidence (Amendment) (Northern Ireland) Order (SI 2007/288).

==== Scotland ====
While no statutory provision for citizen's arrest exists in Scots law, there is a common law position that anyone committing an offence can be arrested using minimum force if necessary with consideration to what is reasonable in the relevant circumstances. The offence must be a serious one and not merely for a breach of the peace. The person exercising the power must have witnessed the offence occurring therefore they cannot act upon information from another person.

A statement approved in a series of cases from the High Court of Justiciary, the highest criminal court in Scotland, outlines that:

"A private citizen is entitled to arrest without warrant for a serious crime he has witnessed, or perhaps where, being the victim of the crime, he has information equivalent to personal observation, as where the fleeing criminal is pointed out to him by an eye witness".

As confirmed in Wightman v. Procurator Fiscal the meaning of, "information equivalent to personal observation" extends to, being aware of circumstances which are strongly indicative of a crime having been committed. But it also says that the rule of personal observation should not be departed from lightly and should not extend to suspicion of an offence and that the question in each case becomes one of degrees and whether the information relied upon in the circumstances leads to the conclusion that a crime has been committed.

=== United States ===
In the United States, a private person may arrest another without a warrant for a crime occurring in their presence. However, the crimes for which this is permitted vary by state.

==== Common law ====
Most states have codified the common law rule that a warrantless arrest may be made by a private person for a felony, misdemeanor, or "breach of peace". "Breach of peace" covers a multitude of violations in which the Supreme Court has even included a misdemeanor seatbelt violation punishable only by a fine. The term historically included theft, "nightwalking", prostitution, and playing card and dice games. Texas courts have defined and interpreted the term "breach of the peace" to mean an act that disturbs or threatens to disturb the tranquility enjoyed by the citizens.

==== State statutes ====
Consider, for an example of this codification, California Penal Code section 837:

837. A private person may arrest another:

1. For a public offense committed or attempted in his/her presence.
2. When the person arrested has committed a felony, although not in his/her presence.
3. When a felony has been in fact committed, and he or she has reasonable cause for believing the person arrested to have committed it.

"Public offense" is read similarly as breach of peace in this case and includes felonies, misdemeanors, and infractions. There is generally no provision for an investigative detention by a private person under the law. With certain exceptions (see below), an arrest must be made. "Holding them until the police get there" is simply a form of arrest. The officer is accepting the arrest and processing the prisoner on behalf of the private person.

In the case of felonies, a private person may make an arrest for a felony occurring outside their presence, but the rule is that a felony must have, in fact, been committed. For example, consider a suspect that has been seen on surveillance video vandalizing a building to the extent that the arrestor believes it rises to a felony due to the damage. If they find the suspect and make the arrest but it later turns out that it was misdemeanor damage, the arrestor is liable for false arrest because a felony had not, in fact, been committed.

Because most states have codified their arrest laws, there are many variations. For example, in Pennsylvania, the courts have been clear that a non-law enforcement officer cannot make an arrest for a "summary offense". In North Carolina, there is no de jure "citizen's arrest". Although it is essentially the same, North Carolina law refers to it as a "detention". The state of Georgia repealed its citizen's arrest law amid accusations that it had the potential for abuse and racial bias after the murder of Ahmaud Arbery and replaced it with a narrower law applying only to business owners, inspectors, security guards, and private investigators.

Other states seem to allow only arrests in cases of felonies, but court decisions have ruled more broadly. For example, in Virginia, the statute appears to only permit warrantless arrests by officers listed in the Code. However, Virginia courts have upheld warrantless arrests by non-law enforcement personnel for breach of the peace misdemeanors. Other non-police persons are granted arrest authority by statute, in the case of those who are state-certified, armed security officers: "A registered armed security officer of a private security services business while at a location which the business is contracted to protect shall have the power to effect an arrest for an offense occurring (i) in his presence on such premises or (ii) in the presence of a merchant, agent, or employee of the merchant the private security business has contracted to protect" and "For the purposes of § 19.2-74, a registered armed security officer of a private security services business shall be considered an arresting officer."

==== Use of force ====
In general, a private person is considered to be justified in using non-deadly force upon another if they reasonably believe that: (1) such other person is committing a felony, or a misdemeanor amounting to a breach of the peace; and (2) the force used is necessary to prevent further commission of the offense and to apprehend the offender. The force must be reasonable under the circumstances to restrain the individual arrested. This includes the nature of the offense and the amount of force required to overcome resistance. In Texas, a civilian may use reasonable force, including deadly force if reasonable, to prevent an escape from a lawful citizen's arrest.

==== Shopkeeper's (merchant's) privilege ====
In some states of the United States, the courts recognize a common law shopkeeper's privilege under which a shopkeeper is allowed to detain a suspected shoplifter on store property for a reasonable period of time, so long as the shopkeeper has cause to believe that the person detained in fact committed, or attempted to commit, theft of store property. The purpose of this detention is to recover the property and make an arrest if the merchant desires.

==== Differing liability from police ====
Private persons are occasionally granted immunity from civil or criminal liability, like the police are, when arresting others. While the powers to arrest are similar, police are entitled to mistake of fact in most cases, while civilians can be held to a stricter liability depending on the individual state. Police can also detain anyone upon reasonable suspicion. However, ordinary citizens cannot claim "qualified immunity" to attempt to defend against a civil complaint for false arrest.

== See also ==
- R. v. Asante-Mensah
- Shopkeeper's privilege
- Individuals with powers of arrest
- Powers of the police in England and Wales
- Breach of the peace (England/Wales)
- Neighborhood watch
- Hue and cry
