= False imprisonment =

Illegal restraint of a person in a bounded area without justification or consent

False imprisonment or unlawful imprisonment occurs when a person intentionally restricts another person's movement within any area without legal authority, justification, or the restrained person's permission.

Actual physical restraint is not necessary for false imprisonment to occur. A false imprisonment claim may be made based upon private acts, or upon wrongful governmental detention.

For detention by the police, proof of false imprisonment provides a basis to obtain a writ of habeas corpus.

Under common law, false imprisonment is both a crime and a tort.

== Imprisonment ==
Within the context of false imprisonment, an imprisonment occurs when a person is restrained from moving from a location or bounded area, as a result of a wrongful intentional act, such as the use of force, threat, coercion, or abuse of authority.

== Detention that is not false imprisonment ==
Not all acts of involuntary detention amount to false imprisonment. For example, an accidental detention will not support a claim of false imprisonment since false imprisonment requires an intentional act. The law may privilege a person to detain somebody else against their will. A legally authorised detention does not constitute false imprisonment. For example, if a parent or legal guardian of a child denies the child's request to leave their house, and prevents them from doing so, this would not ordinarily constitute false imprisonment.

== By country ==
=== United States ===
Under United States law, police officers have the authority to detain individuals based on probable cause that a crime has been committed and the individual was involved, or based on reasonable suspicion that the individual has been, is, or is about to be engaged in a criminal activity.

==== Elements ====
To prevail under a false imprisonment claim, a plaintiff must prove:

1. Willful detention in a bounded area
2. Without consent; and
3. Without authority of lawful arrest. (Restatement of the Law, Second, Torts)

==== Shopkeeper's privilege ====
Many jurisdictions in the United States recognize the common-law principle of shopkeeper's privilege, under which a person is allowed to use reasonable force to detain a suspected shoplifter on store property for a reasonable period of time. A shopkeeper, who has cause to believe that the detainee has committed or attempted a theft of store property, is allowed to ask the suspect to demonstrate that they have not been shoplifting. The purpose of the shopkeeper's privilege is to discover if the suspect is shoplifting and, if so, whether the shoplifted item can be reclaimed.

The shopkeeper's privilege is not as broad as police officer's privilege to arrest. The shopkeeper may only detain the suspect for a comparatively short period of time. If a shopkeeper unreasonably detains the suspect, uses excessive force to detain the suspect, or fails to notify the police within a reasonable time after detaining the suspect, then the detention may constitute false imprisonment and may result in an award of damages. In jurisdictions without the privilege, detention must meet the jurisdiction's standards for a citizen's arrest.

===== Rationale =====
This privilege has been justified by the very practical need for some degree of protection for shopkeepers in their dealings with suspected shoplifters. Absent such privilege, a shopkeeper would be faced with the dilemma of either allowing suspects to leave without challenge or acting upon their suspicion and risk making a false arrest.

===== Requirement =====
In order for a customer to be detained, the shopkeeper must:

1. Conduct the investigation on the store premises, or immediately near the premises.
2. Have reasonable cause to believe the person detained was shoplifting.
3. Use reasonable (non-excessive) force to detain the suspected individual.
4. Not prolong the detention longer than a reasonable amount of time needed to gather all the facts.

==== Examples ====
===== Colorado =====
In Enright v. Groves, a woman sued a police officer for false imprisonment after being arrested for not producing her driver's license. The plaintiff was in her car when she was approached by the officer for not leashing her dog; she was arrested after being asked to produce her driver's license and failing to do so. She won her claim, despite having lost the case of not leashing her dog. The court reasoned that the officer did not have proper legal authority in arresting her, because he arrested her for not producing her driver's license (which itself was legal) as opposed to the dog leash violation.

===== Indiana =====
In a Clark County, Indiana Circuit Court case, Destiny Hoffman was jailed for 154 days, during which "no hearing was conducted to determine the validity of such sanction and the defendant was not represented by counsel" according to deputy county prosecutor Michaelia Gilbert. An order by Judge Jerry Jacobi in the Clark County Circuit Court case was supposed to be a 48-hour jail stay for Hoffman, pending drug evaluation and treatment, "until further order of the court." After a motion by Prosecutor Gilbert, Special Judge Steve Fleece ordered Hoffman released and said Hoffman's incarceration was "a big screw up".

===== Louisiana =====
In a Louisiana case in the United States, a pharmacist and his pharmacy were found liable by a trial court for false imprisonment. They stalled for time and instructed a patient to wait while simultaneously and without the patient's knowledge calling the police. The pharmacist was suspicious of the patient's prescription, which her doctor had called in previously. When the police arrived, they arrested the patient. While the patient was in jail, the police verified with her doctor that the prescription was authentic and that it was meant for her. After this incident, the patient sued the pharmacy and its employees. She received $20,000 damages. An appeals court reversed the judgment, because it believed the elements of false imprisonment were not met.

=== United Kingdom ===
This tort falls under the umbrella term "trespass to the person" alongside "battery and assault". The definition of false imprisonment under UK law and legislation is the "Unlawful imposition or constraint of another's freedom of movement from a particular place." False imprisonment is where the defendant intentionally or recklessly, and unlawfully, restricts the claimant's freedom of movement totally. During which there is no time limit, false imprisonment could occur for seconds and still be false imprisonment.

Any restraint of the liberty of a free man will be an imprisonment.

— Lord Denman CJ

==== Elements ====
===== Intentional or reckless =====
An example of reckless imprisonment may be a janitor locking up a school for the night, knowing that someone might still be inside, but without bothering to check. Whereas, regarding intention, intention to imprison a person is what matters and not necessarily an intention to falsely imprison someone. For example, in R v Governor of Brockhill Prison, ex p Evans, it did not matter if the decision to imprison the claimant was in good faith, or considered lawful, it still constituted false imprisonment.

False imprisonment does not require a literal prison, but a restriction of the claimant's freedom of movement (complete restraint). According to the Termes de la Ley, 'imprisonment is the restraint of a man's liberty, whether it be in the open field, or in the stocks, or in the cage in the streets or in a man's own house, as well as in the common gaole'. Imprisonment does not have to involve seizure of the claimant; touching and informing him that he is under arrest are sufficient. Tagging and an imposed curfew can be false imprisonment. The restriction must also be total, meaning that the claimant is restricted to an area delimited by the defendant. The larger the area, the less likely the claimant will be deemed to be imprisoned. For example, confining a person to a house would constitute the tort of false imprisonment. However, confining someone to the land mass of the USA would not.

Therefore, false imprisonment is not just about locking someone within a room, the following examples have all been found to constitute false imprisonment:

- Where a defendant might position themselves in a doorway to prevent someone leaving a room, as in Walker v Commissioner of the Police of the Metropolis [2014].
- Where a defendant might threaten violence if the claimant leaves, which could thus be both false imprisonment and assault.
- Where a defendant ensures someone stays in a room simply by asserting their authority, as in Harnett v Bond and Meering v Grahame-White Aviation.

Finally, where a claimant accedes to authority that does not necessarily mean they consent to being detained, as in Warner v Riddiford (1858).

===== Complete restraint =====
'Imprisonment is, as I apprehend, a total restraint of the liberty of the person, for however, short a time, and not a partial obstruction of his will, whatever inconvenience it may bring on him.' There must be complete restraint, therefore, if there are alternative routes that can be taken this is not false imprisonment. Such as in Bird v Jones [1845] where the claimant wanted to walk over Hammersmith bridge but the defendant had cordoned off the public footpath, however, this did not constitute false imprisonment because, through using a longer route, the claimant could have still reached their destination.

Therefore, if there is a means of escape, this is not false imprisonment. There must be no reasonable means of escape and you may be compensated for any damages caused in order for you to escape reasonably. However, if you have not taken a reasonable route of escape/reasonable action you will not be awarded damages.

===== Awareness =====
It is still false imprisonment even where the claimant does not know at the time. So secretly locking someone in a room is false imprisonment. It may also be false imprisonment where a person is rendered unconscious, for example, by being punched (also a battery), or when their drink is spiked by drugs (also wilful harm or negligence), because their freedom of movement is thereby restricted. For example, in the case of Meering v Grahame-White Aviation [1918] the claimant was told to stay in an office because property was going missing and if they tried to leave the office they would have been stopped. This was held to be a false imprisonment even though the claimant did not know they were being imprisoned.

===== Omission =====
In the majority of circumstances/generally, the tort of false imprisonment cannot be committed by omission (a failure to act). Yet, in certain circumstances defendants may still be found liable if they are under a positive obligation to release the claimant and the claimant has the legal right to be released. In the case of Prison Officer's Association v Iqbal where a defendant could not leave their cell due to the prison officers being on strike, it was held at [61] that:

'It seems to me that the general rule that an omission or refusal to release the claimant from confinement will not amount to false imprisonment should not be overridden save in circumstances where the claimant has a legal right to be released and the defendant is under a positive obligation to release the claimant.'

Thus, the defendants were liable for omission under the tort of false imprisonment.

Moreover, in the case of R v Governor of Brockhill Prison, ex p Evans, where the claimant should be released from prison but due to a genuine mistake they were instead held in prison for longer, this was still held to be false imprisonment.

===== Lawful imprisonment =====
====== Performance of a contract ======
This can be looked at as consent, therefore, the imprisonment is not unlawful nor false imprisonment, for example, when flying, you consent to be on the plane for that duration of time through contract. The courts have said it is not unlawful to refuse to open a train door when the train is on a bridge, even though the passenger is thereby restricted inside the train. Likewise, a master of a ship, or the pilot of a plane can detain people during a voyage or flight when they have a reasonable cause or grounds to believe it necessary for the safety of their other passengers. Suddenly saying "I would like to leave now" is dangerous and thus, they have no reason to let you leave, moreover, you are contractually obligated to remain onboard. Therefore, this would not constitute false imprisonment.

Additionally, when a claimant is following a work contract the employer may not be held for false imprisonment for not allowing them to leave early due to a breach of contract and potential losses that could result from them leaving. In the case of Herd v Weardale Steel Coal where the claimant was in a mine, they were working and they wanted to leave the mine. The employer refused to let them leave at that time and the court held that the employer was under no obligation to allow them to do so.

====== Police ======
Under English law, police have the right to arrest under a warrant issued by a magistrate, and following conditions set out in PACE Code G. Or without a warrant, police may make an arrest pursuant to the Police and Criminal Evidence Act 1984: 'anyone who is about to commit, is committing or has committed an offence or is so suspected on reasonable grounds may be arrested.' Also, arrest may be lawful if the police have reason to believe that the person arrested poses an imminent risk of harm to themselves or others. Private citizens can also make an arrest for crimes being committed/that have been committed but only in relation to indictable offences ('citizen's arrest'). When a prisoner is lawfully held, it is not false imprisonment just because the conditions are unsanitary such as in the case of R v Deputy Governor of Parkhurst Prison, 'although this may instead be found to be negligence or the tort of misfeasance in a public office.'

Another example would again be the case of Austin v Commissioner of Police of the Metropolis [2007], a case concerning the alleged unlawful detention of hundreds of members of the public during the May Day riots of 2001 in London, England. The police, using the tactic of "kettling", held a large crowd in Oxford Circus without allowing anyone to leave. Lois Austin, a peaceful protester who had not broken the law, and Geoffrey Saxby, an innocent passer-by who was not involved in the demonstration, claimed that they were falsely imprisoned by the London Metropolitan Police and that their detention was in breach of the European Convention of Human Rights. The pair lost their court action in 2005, when the High Court ruled that the police had not acted unlawfully. An appeal against the ruling also failed in 2007. A ruling by the House of Lords declared that 'even in the case of an absolute right, the High Court was entitled to take the "purpose" of the deprivation of liberty into account before deciding if human rights law applied at all.'

== Defences ==
Defences for false imprisonment include consent and performance of a contract. Moreover, the defence of illegality may also apply. If the victim was acting illegally, locking them in a room to protect oneself whilst calling the police is a legitimate defence. However, if the use of force or in this case imprisonment was unreasonable, this would not be a viable defence, as is shown in the case of Revil v Newbery where a homeowner fired a shotgun to the burglar and ended up injuring him, this was held to be an unreasonable use of force and thus, the defence of illegality was void.

== Damages ==
If the false imprisonment was for a minimal amount of time, the claimant could be entitled to nominal damages, as this tort is actionable per se. In Walker v Commissioner of the Police of the Metropolis [2014] where someone was stopped in a doorway for a couple of seconds this was still held to be false imprisonment. Additionally, if the applicant was injured through trying to escape using reasonable methods they may be entitled to compensatory damages. When law enforcement authorities violate the fundamental rights enshrined in the constitution by detaining people without sufficient reason or disregarding due process, then it undermines the country's judicial system. Such actions violate individuals' rights while gravely damaging public trust in the criminal justice process. Finally, if the claimant suffered an 'affront to their dignity', they may be awarded aggravated damages (these are very rare). For example, in the case of Hook v Cunard Steamship Co Ltd the sailor was confined to his quarters and accused of child molestation but with 'no vestige of grounds in support', this was held to be false imprisonment and aggravated damages were available due to this causing humiliation and injury to the claimant's feelings.

== See also ==
- Wrongful detention – Detention without evidence or likelihood of crime, or without due process
- Damages – Legal term for compensation awarded for loss or injury
- Child abduction – Unauthorized removal of a minor
- False accusations – Claim or allegation of wrongdoing that is untrue
- False arrest – Unlawful arrest of an individual
- Hostage – Person seized by abductor to compel action by another party
- Kidnapping – Unlawful abduction of someone and holding them captive
- List of long-term false imprisonment cases
- Police brutality – Use of excessive force by a police officer
- Ransom – Illegal method for gain from release of prisoners
- Political violence – Violence conducted with political goals
- Battery (tort)
