= Assault with intent to resist arrest =

Statutory offence of aggravated assault

Assault with intent to resist arrest is a statutory offence of aggravated assault in England and Wales and Northern Ireland and the Republic of Ireland.

== England and Wales ==
This offence is created by section 38 of the Offences against the Person Act 1861 which provides:

Whosoever ... shall assault any person with intent to resist or prevent the lawful apprehension or detainer of himself or of any other person for any offence, shall be guilty of a misdemeanor, and being convicted thereof shall be liable, at the discretion of the court, to be imprisoned for any term not exceeding two years, ...

=== Repeals ===
The words omitted in the first place were repealed by section 64(3) of, and Part I of Schedule 10 to, the Police Act 1964 and section 10(2) of, and Part III of Schedule 3 to, the Criminal Law Act 1967. The words omitted at the end were repealed by section 1(2) of the Criminal Justice Act 1948.

=== Lawful apprehension or detainer for any offence ===
R v Self clarifies that where no offence was committed (such as when they are acquitted of it and no one else could have committed it), their citizen's arrest after the suspected offence was unlawful, and thus the offence of assault with intent to resist lawful arrest is not made out.

See arrest.

=== Misdemeanour ===
See the Criminal Law Act 1967.

=== Visiting forces ===
This offence is an offence against the person for the purposes of section 3 of the Visiting Forces Act 1952.

=== Mode of trial ===
This offence is triable either way.

=== Sentence ===
A person guilty of this offence is liable, on conviction on indictment, to imprisonment for a term not exceeding two years, or, on summary conviction, to imprisonment for a term not exceeding six months, or to a fine not exceeding the prescribed sum, or to both.

There is also a general power to fine on indictment.

== Northern Ireland ==
This offence is created by section 7(1) of the Criminal Justice (Miscellaneous Provisions) Act (Northern Ireland) 1968 (c. 28 (N.I.)), which replaces the corresponding provision in section 38 of the Offences against the Person Act 1861.

== Republic of Ireland ==
This offence is created by section 19(1)(c) of the Criminal Justice (Public Order) Act, 1994, which replaces the corresponding provision in section 38 of the Offences against the Person Act 1861.

History

As to the summary trial of offences under section 38 of the Offences against the Person Act 1861, see section 2 of, and paragraph 9 of the First Schedule to, the Criminal Justice Act, 1951.
