= Domenico Griminelli =

Italian mathematician and priest

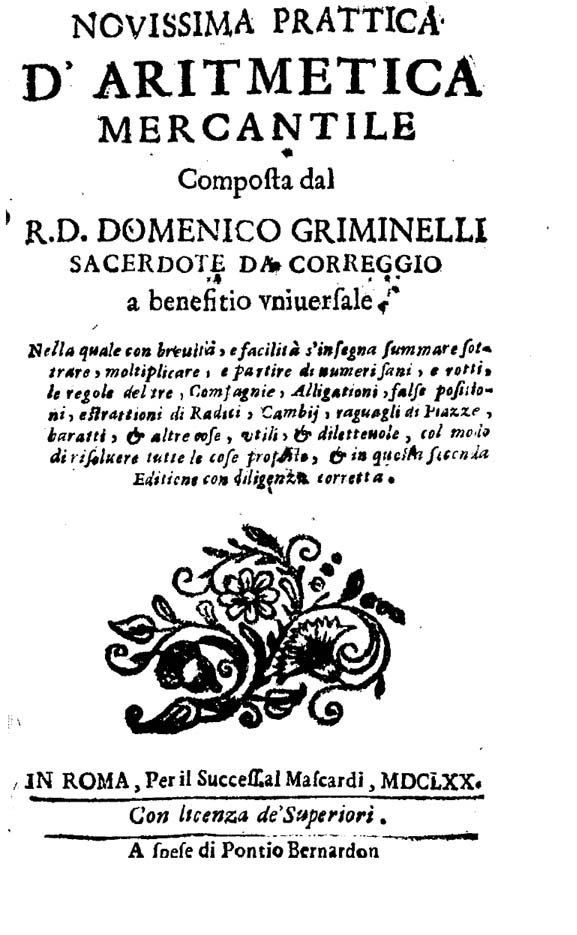
Novissima prattica d'aritmetica mercantile, title page (1670)

Domenico Griminelli was a 17th-century Italian mathematician and Catholic priest from Correggio, Emilia-Romagna.

He published in 1656 a tutorial book on arithmetic for shopkeepers and merchants, Novissima prattica d'aritmetica mercantile ("Brand-new practice of mercantile arithmetic"), also known outside Italy and reprinted for two centuries. The book's introduction echoed Plato in declaring numbers to be a divine gift, without which civilization would vanish, and dedicated the work to cardinal Girolamo Gastaldi, the General Treasurer of the Apostolic Camera.

== Works ==
- Novissima prattica d'aritmetica mercantile. Roma: Vitale Mascardi eredi & Ponzio Bernardon. 1670. Archive.org
