= Criminal Justice (Public Order) Act 1994 =

The Criminal Justice (Public Order) Act 1994 is legislation that covers public order offences in Ireland. It is the main legislation on the matter of public order, deals with how people behave in public places and provides for crowd control at public events. Gardaí have powers to arrest people without warrant for most offences under the act. In particular, someone suspected of committing a public order offence may be asked their name and address, and arrested without warrant upon refusal.

== Offences ==
=== Intoxication in a public place ===
Intoxication in a public place is an offence under section 4 of the act. If a Garda suspects a person of being intoxicated they can confiscate any intoxicating substance from them.

The penalty is either a fixed charge of €100 or a maximum class E fine of €500 if the Gardaí decide to prosecute and there is a conviction.

=== Disorderly conduct in a public place ===
It is an offence to engage in offensive conduct between the hours of midnight and 7am or at any time if a Garda asks you to.

Offensive behaviour is unreasonable behaviour likely to cause serious offence or annoyance to other people. This is to deal with disorderly behaviour that falls short of threatening behaviour but which could still adversely affect people's lives.

An example is people shouting loudly after leaving a night club, which could annoy local residents.

The penalty for this is either a fixed charge fine of €140 or the maximum class D fine if the Gardaí prosecute and there is a conviction.

A person must give their name and address when asked for them if they want this offence treated as a fixed charge offence. Someone who doesn't give their name and address can be arrested without warrant and convicted of a summary offence for which the maximum fine is a class C fine.

=== Threatening, abusive or insulting behaviour in a public place ===
It is an offence to engage in threatening, abusive or insulting behaviour in a public place with the intent of breaching the peace.

An example is someone trying to provoke a fight with someone else using insults.

If found guilty of such an offence, someone can be given a class D fine and prison sentence of up to three months.

=== Begging in an intimidating or threatening manner ===
It is an offence to beg in an intimidating or threatening manner. Someone found guilty of this offence is liable on summary conviction to a class E fine or up to one month in prison or both.

Gardaí can direct someone to leave certain areas if they are begging there - e.g. a shop entrance or at an ATM.

It is also an offence to organise or direct someone else to beg. A summary conviction can mean a class A fine, up to 12 months in prison or both.

=== Distributing or displaying threatening, abusive, insulting or obscene material in a public place ===
It is an offence to distribute or display threatening, abusive, insulting or obscene material in a public place. A conviction can result in a class D fine, a prison sentence of up to three months or both.

Because the interpretation of something being obscene may be subjective, courts will apply the "ordinary man" test when deciding whether material is obscene or not.

=== Failure to comply with the direction of a member of the Garda Síochána ===
It is an offence to not comply with a Garda's request to stop behaving in a way that the Garda believes endangers the safety of others, their property or the public peace. Gardaí can ask people to "move on" to avert potential trouble.

It is an offence not to comply with these directions without a reasonable excuse or lawful authority to do so. Anyone convicted is liable on summary conviction to a class D fine, a maximum prison term of six months or both.

=== Wilful obstruction ===
It is an offence to prevent a person or their vehicle from passing freely in a public place without legal authority or a reasonable excuse. The penalty is a fine of up to €400.

Gardaí do not have a power to arrest for this offence, they can direct people to stop the obstruction. Failure to comply with the direction is an offence.

=== Entering a building with intent to commit an offence ===
It is an offence to enter a building or its vicinity with the intent to commit an offence or interfere with property. It suffices to be on the property as this offence is defined, but the prosecution must prove intent.

Anyone convicted will, on summary conviction, be liable for a class C fine, a maximum prison term of 6 months or both.

=== Trespass ===
It is an offence to trespass in a way that is likely to cause fear in someone else. This does not include any intent to commit crime or interfere with property. Someone found guilty of this crime is liable on summary conviction to a class C fine, a maximum term of imprisonment of 12 months or both.

A Garda can direct anyone they fine trespassing in such a manner to leave the area in a peaceable and orderly manner. Failure to comply with such a direction without a reasonable excuse or lawful authority is an offence. Anyone found guilty of this offence is liable to a class D fine, a maximum of six months imprisonment or both.

=== Riot ===
Riot is one of the most serious public order offences.

It is defined as when:

- 12 or more people use or threaten to use violence
- with common purpose
- their conduct would cause a reasonable person to fear for their safety or for that of someone else
- they actually used violence.

This offence can be committed in a public or private place. It can be used in situations where people assemble in protest and their behaviour becomes unlawful violence. The penalty is an unlimited fine, a period of imprisonment for up to 10 years or both.

=== Violent disorder ===
Violent disorder is a similar offence to riot, but is of a lesser degree. It is defined as when:

- 3 or more people are gathered at a place
- they use or threaten to use violence
- their conduct would cause someone of reasonable firmness who was present to fear for their own safety or that of someone else.

Apart from the number of people involved the differences between riot and are that violence must have been used in riot but not in violence disorder and that in riot the group must share a common purpose which violent disorder does not require.

The penalty is an unlimited fine, a period of imprisonment for up to 10 years or both.

=== Affray ===
This offence is when two or more people use or threaten to use unlawful violence between each other and their conduct would cause someone of reasonable firmness who was present to fear for their own safety or that of someone else. The violence must be between those involved and not aimed at innocent third parties. It requires unlawful violence, threats alone do not suffice.

The penalty is an unlimited fine, a period of imprisonment for up to 5 years or both.

=== Blackmail, extortion and demanding money with menaces ===
It is an offence for a person to make unwarranted demands with menaces to make personal gains for themselves or someone else or with the intent to cause a loss for someone else. An exception exists if:

- the person making the demands believes they have reasonable grounds for making them
- they believe the use of menaces is a proper way of enforcing the demand.

The courts have held that "menaces" are to be interpreted broadly.

The penalty is an unlimited fine, a period of imprisonment for up to 14 years or both.

=== Assault with intent to cause bodily harm or commit an indictable offence ===
While the main law that deals with assault is the Non-Fatal Offences Against the Person Act 1997, section 18 of this act creates another offence of assault with intent to cause bodily harm or to commit an indictable offence. It covers aggravated assaults when there is intent to injure or commit an indictable offence.

The penalty is an unlimited fine, a period of imprisonment for up to 5 years or both.

=== Assault or obstruction of a peace officer ===
It is an offence to threaten a peace officer or someone providing medical services at a hospital. Peace officers are:

- members of the Garda Síochána
- members of the Fire Brigade
- Ambulance personnel
- Prison officers
- members of the Defence Forces.

This covers assaults on:

- a peace officer or someone providing medical services at a hospital
- anyone assisting a peace officer or someone providing medical services.

It is also an offence to assault such people to prevent the lawful arrest or detention of someone for an offence.

The penalty is an unlimited fine, a period of imprisonment for up to 7 years or both.

Someone could also be guilty of this offence for obstructing:

- a peace officer or someone providing medical services at a hospital
- anyone assisting a peace officer or someone providing medical services.

Someone found guilty of this crime is liable on summary conviction to a class C fine, a maximum term of imprisonment of 6 months or both.
