= In flagrante delicto =

Legal term

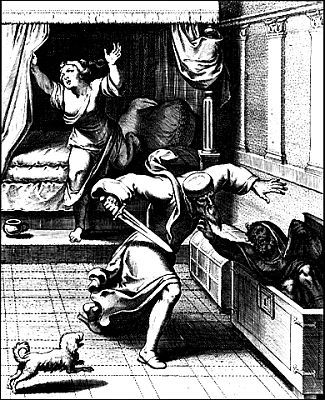
in Flagranti, Antwerp 1607

In flagrante delicto (Latin for "in blazing offence"), sometimes simply in flagrante ("in blazing"), is a legal term used to indicate that a criminal has been caught in the act of committing an offence (compare corpus delicti). The colloquial "caught red-handed" is an English equivalent.

Aside from the legal meaning, the Latin term is often used colloquially as euphemism for someone being caught in the midst of sexual activity.

== Etymology ==
The phrase combines the present active participle flagrāns (flaming or blazing) with the noun dēlictum (offence, misdeed, or crime). In this term the Latin preposition in, not indicating motion, takes the ablative. The closest literal translation would be "in blazing offence", where "blazing" is a metaphor for vigorous, highly visible action.

== Worldwide ==
=== Latin America ===
In many Latin American countries, being caught in flagrante (Spanish: en flagrancia, Portuguese: em flagrante) is a common legal requirement for both detention and search and seizure. Naturally, being caught in flagrante makes convictions easier to obtain; in some jurisdictions where the police are not adept at investigation and the use of forensic science is not widespread, it may be difficult to get a conviction any other way. On occasion, governments with such constitutional requirements have been accused of stretching the definition of in flagrante in order to carry out illegal arrests. In Brazil, a member of the National Congress cannot be arrested unless caught in flagrante delicto of a non-bailable crime, and whether or not a member's detention should continue is decided by their parliamentary peers.

=== Japan ===
In Japan, the phrase's translation, Genkōhan (現行犯), is used to refer to citizen's arrest, and is listed under Section 213 of the Code of Criminal Procedure as such.

== See also ==
- Probable cause
- Smoking gun
