= R v Governor of Brockhill Prison, ex p Evans =

UK legal case

Regina v Governor of Her Majesty's Prison Brockhill, ex parte Evans (No 2)
- Court: House of Lords
- Decided: 27 July 2000
- Citation: [2001] 2 AC 19, [2000] 3 WLR 843, [2000] 4 All ER 15, [2000] UKHRR 836

Court membership
- Judges sitting: Lord Browne-Wilkinson, Lord Hobhouse of Woodborough, Lord Hope of Craighead, Lord Slynn of Hadley, Lord Steyn

R v Governor of Brockhill Prison, ex parte Evans (No 2) is an English case decided by the House of Lords on appeal from the Court of Appeal. It has been called "important".

It involved the unlawful detention of a prisoner. The governor had sentenced the prisoner on the basis of an interpretation of a statute which had originally been supported by the courts, but which had subsequently been held to be wrong. It was clear that the governor was blameless, but the sentence raised questions as to whether the new interpretation of the statute should apply prospectively only. The majority of the Law Lords held that, on the facts of this case, it was not appropriate for the interpretation to apply prospectively only, but all of them also accepted that the development of a rule might, in appropriate circumstances, apply prospectively. Lord Slynn of Hadley reasoned that "there may be decisions in which it would be desirable, and in no way unjust, that the effect of judicial rulings should be prospective or limited to certain claimants."

== Court of Appeal ==
Regina v Governor of Her Majesty's Prison Brockhill, ex parte Evans (No 2)
- Court: Court of Appeal of England and Wales
- Decided: 19 June 1998
- Citation: [1999] 1 QB 1043, [1999] 1 WLR 103, [1998] 4 All ER 993

Court membership
- Judges sitting: Lord Woolf MR, Lord Roch LJ, Lord Judge LJ

The Court of Appeal decision was made in 1998 by the Civil Division of the Court of Appeal, on appeal from the Queen's Bench Division of the High Court.
