= Shrinkage (accounting) =

When a retailer has fewer items in stock than in the inventory list

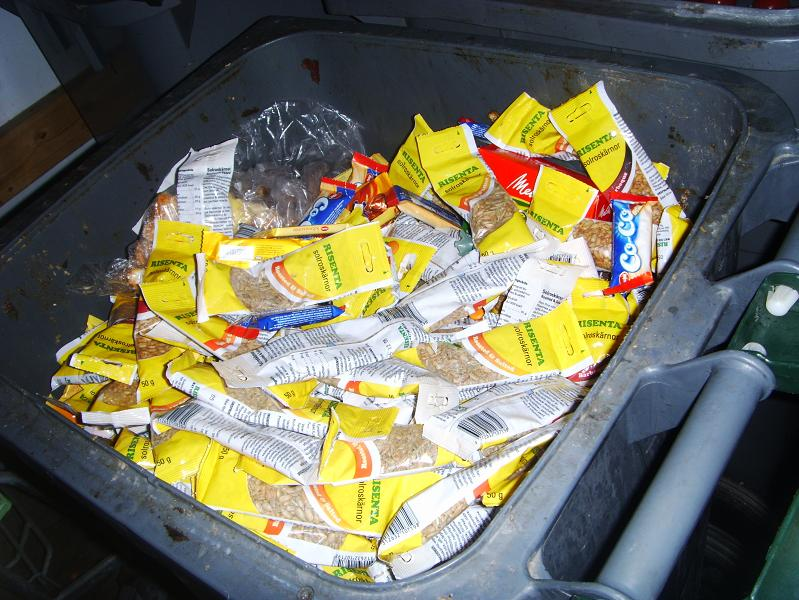
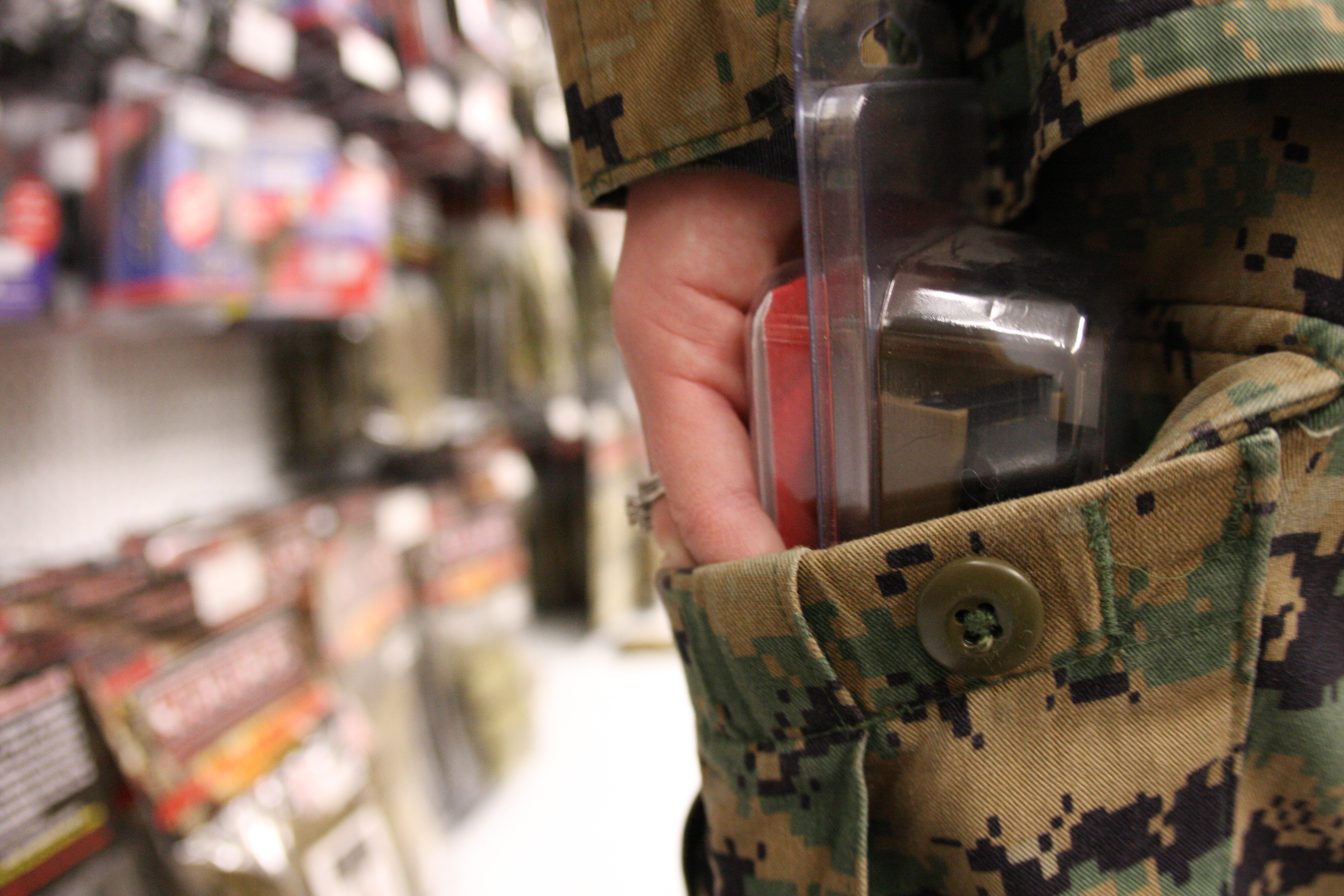
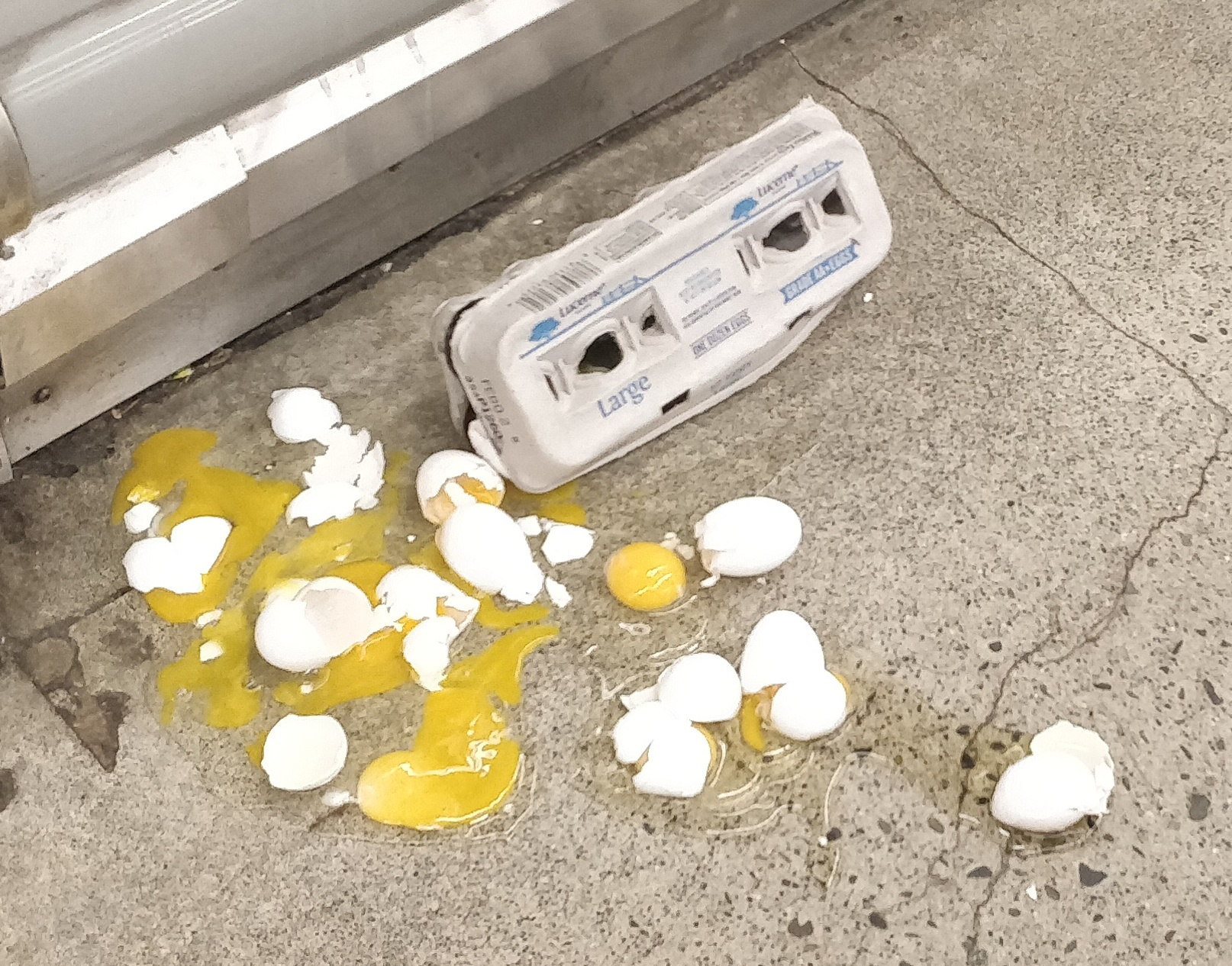
Food spoilage, shoplifting, spills and damage to items can cause shrinkage.

In accounting, shrinkage or shrink occurs when a retailer has fewer items in stock than were expected by the inventory list. This can be caused by clerical error or by goods being damaged, lost, or stolen between the point of manufacture (or purchase from a supplier) and the point of sale. High shrinkage can adversely affect a retailer's profit.

In 2008, the retail industry in the United States experienced shrinkage rates of around 1.52% of sales. During the same year, retailers in Europe and Asia Pacific reported average shrinkage of about 1.27% and 1.20% of sales, respectively.

== Causes ==
According to the 2008 National Retail Security Survey conducted at the University of Florida, a shrinkage rate of 1.51% translates to $36.3 billion in annual loss ($15.5 billion to employee theft and $12.9 billion to shoplifters). Theft, both internal and external to the company, continues to be the driving force behind retail inventory shrinkage, at 78.3% of all shrinkage in 2008. Of that portion, 42.7% is attributed to employee (also known as internal) theft and 35.6% was due to external theft, known as shoplifting.

The prevention of this type of shrinkage is one reason for security guards, cameras and security tags. Other causes of shrinkage include:

- Administrative errors such as shipping errors, warehouse discrepancies, and misplaced goods
- Cashier or price-check errors in the customer's favour
- Damage in transit or in the store
- Paperwork errors
- Perishable goods not sold within their shelf life
- Vendor fraud
- Recalled items
- Returns and exchanges especially if the item returned or exchanged is not resellable

=== Loss at the POS terminal ===
Shrinkage in retail that is caused by employee actions typically occurs at the point of sale (POS) terminal. There are different ways to manipulate a POS system, such as a cashier giving customers unauthorized discounts, creating fraudulent returns, or simply removing cash from the register. These questionable transactions are called POS exceptions. Traditionally, POS fraud is fought by surveillance staff monitoring a POS terminal or manually searching surveillance video recordings. Modern POS systems can have automatic alerts when specific exceptions are detected. Also exception reports and listings based on employees, refunds, price overrides, terminals etc. are possible to detect with modern systems. Modern networked-based POS systems can also include network video to POS exception listings, giving quick access to detailed information of what has happened.

In the United States, the National Retail Security Survey is published annually as part of the Security Research Project at the University of Florida. The Security Research Project endeavors to study various elements of workplace-related crime and deviance with a special emphasis on the retail industry. Since theft is hidden, no study can be completely accurate.

Inventory management systems allow for better control over inventory and will inform companies of the source of the inventory shrinkage, saving costs associated with stock-outs or excess inventory.

Shrinkage figures can be calculated by:

- Beginning Inventory + Purchases − (Sales + Adjustments) = Booked (Invoiced) Inventory
- Booked Inventory − Physical Counted Inventory = Shrinkage
- Shrinkage/Total Sales × 100 = Shrinkage Percent

== See also ==
- Acceptable loss
- Breakage, used for items which remain in inventory, but go unsold
- Retail loss prevention
