= Retail loss prevention =

Practices to reduce loss of goods in retail stores

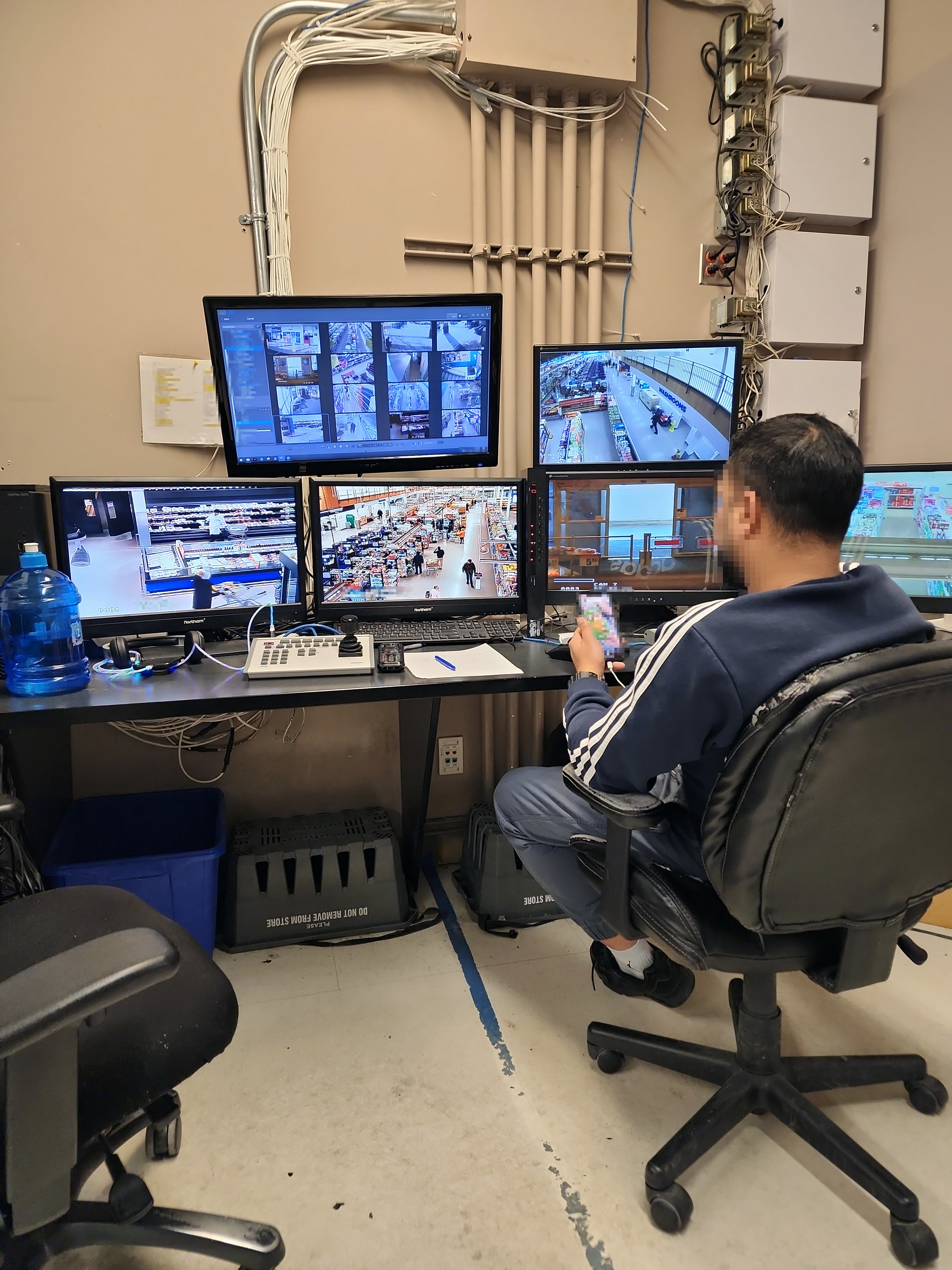
A loss prevention agent was monitoring cameras for potential shoplifters from their workstation.

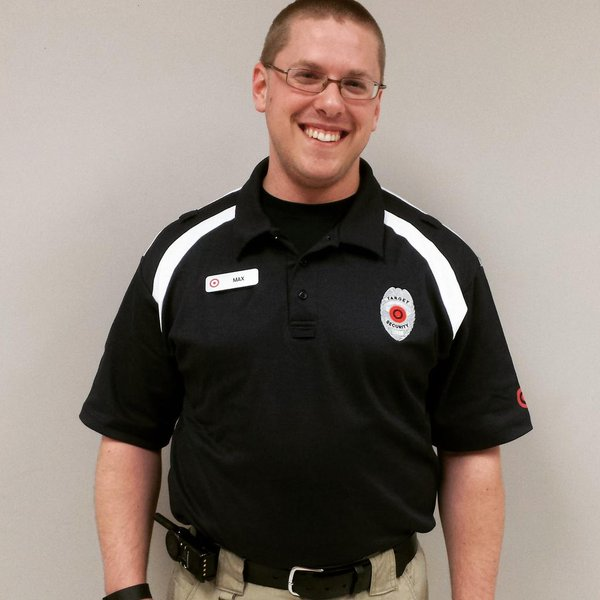
A uniformed retail loss prevention employee for Target. Known as a Target Security Specialist.

Retail loss prevention (also called retail asset protection) is the practice of identifying and addressing causes of inventory shrinkage, including theft, fraud, and mistakes in store operations.

These practices are most common in the retail sector but are also applied in other industries. Individuals working in this field are often called loss prevention officers, asset protection officers, or store detectives.

Historically, many retailers relied on security staff to apprehend shoplifters, but modern loss prevention strategies increasingly include data analysis, staff training, and technological systems such as CCTV and electronic article surveillance.

== Shrink ==
Items unaccounted for compared to what the inventory system believes the store should have are losses or "shrink". Shrink is caused by operational errors, internal theft, and external theft. Retail loss prevention is responsible for identifying these causes and following up with training, preventing, investigating, responding to and resolving them.

In the 2018 National Retail Security Survey (reflecting data from 2017), responding retailers reported shrink averaging 1.33 % of sales. More recent surveys suggest this figure has risen — for example, the 2023 survey (for FY 2022) reports an average rate of 1.6 %.

=== Global shrink rates ===
Average global shrink rates as a table by region, ranging from a high of 1.85% in the US to a low of 1.75% in the Asia-Pacific.

Region	Shrinkage, 2018-2018 (%)
USA	1.85
Europe	1.83
Latin America	1.81
Asian Pacific	1.75
Global	1.82

== Types of loss ==
=== Operational errors ===
Operational errors are inadvertent human errors that occur when workers do not follow existing business best practices and policies or a company lacks the proper best practices and policies to ensure work is performed with minimal human error. Operational errors also occur due to a lack of proper training for workers.

=== External theft ===
External theft is when customers intentionally cause shrink by theft, fraud, or vandalism. Also known as shoplifting, thefts that occur in retail settings are done during business hours and involve the lack of security and prevention measures. Theft prevention can be done by reducing the opportunity to steal in the store through placing prevention mechanisms in place.

Some reports note that shoplifters and organized retail criminals may act aggressively, creating potential risks of injury to employees and shoppers, and raising concerns within communities about apprehension policies. Large retailers have policies regarding apprehension of shoplifters: In the USA, about 40% of retailers indicate that no employees are authorized to apprehend shoplifters. CCTV and other identification evidence are turned over to local law enforcement for possible off-site apprehension.

=== Internal theft ===
Internal theft occurs when employees cause shrinkage through theft, fraud, vandalism, waste, abuse, or misconduct. Because employees may have access to facilities outside of business hours, such cases can result in significant long-term losses for the company.

Internal theft is typically identified through reporting systems, firsthand visual/CCTV surveillance or tips from coworkers. It frequently occurs via dishonest operation of the Point of Sale (POS) system.

Internal theft traditionally causes more loss to a business than external theft due to the increased opportunity available to internal staff members. "A well-informed security superintendent of a nationwide chain of retail stores has estimated that it takes between forty and fifty shoplifting incidents to equal the annual loss caused by one dishonest individual inside an organization."

=== Internal loss ===
Internal loss is caused by associates including internal theft. Examples of such losses include staff members stealing products, cashiers not ringing sales through the tills and keeping the payment for themselves, package pilferage, staff selling products at discounted prices as a third-party distributor, "sweethearting" by giving products for free to other parties by staff, colluding with maintenance staff or external contractors to steal products, and under-ringing merchandise on the tills for other parties so they end up paying less for the items.

Internal loss, as with other forms of shrinkage, can be classified as either "malicious" or "non-malicious". Malicious internal loss is shrinkage caused by individuals within the business such as staff members, cleaning staff and anyone else involved internally. Internal shrinkage accounted for 35 percent of shrinkage to businesses in 2011. Non-malicious shrinkage can result from a number of operational failures within the business structure. The processing of returned or damaged stock, for example, can cause articles to be removed from inventory and discarded (which contributes directly to shrinkage) rather than sold at a discount, donated, returned to vendors for credit, or otherwise removed from inventory in a manner that minimizes financial loss.

== Loss prevention methods ==
=== Apprehensions and recoveries ===
Many large retailers have in-store loss prevention employees trained to reduce shoplifting. This can come in the form of uniformed security officers, undercover security, or both. In the USA, each state allows stores to apprehend and detain shoplifters under shopkeeper's privilege laws. Apprehensions are typically a last resort after attempts to recover merchandise fail. An attempt to recover merchandise is known as a recovery or a "burn" and is generally one of the primary job duties of loss prevention associates. Many retailers operate in-store loss prevention teams including Target, Walmart, Macy's, JCPenney, Nordstrom, and Sephora. Teams generally have 1–15 individuals depending on location.

=== Surveillance and security tags ===
Electronic article surveillance (EAS) is a magnetic device attached to merchandise that triggers an alarm if the item is removed from the store without deactivation. Its introduction has been associated with higher theftarrest rates, although some cases are dismissed due to insufficient evidence or lack of direct observation. A subsequent strategy, known as "benefit denial" (Hayes), aims to reduce incentives for theft by making improperly removed items unusable, for example through the use of ink tags or dye packs.

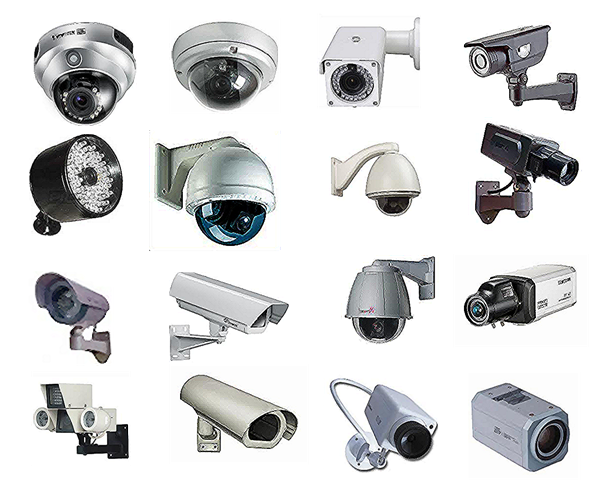
Different types of CCTV

=== CCTV ===
CCTV (closed-circuit television) is a surveillance system used to record theft or misconduct. It is widely used internationally and has been associated with reductions in certain types of crime. It is used to strengthen the central control, responsiveness and crime combating capacity which increases the efficiency and effectiveness of the retail loss prevention methods and strategies.

In the UK, several major supermarket chains have begun installing overhead cameras at self-service checkouts that display a live or replayed feed of customers when items are not scanned correctly or when certain actions (e.g. putting unpaid items in the bagging area) are detected. For example, Tesco has introduced “VAR-style” cameras above some self-checkouts that show a video replay on the checkout screen accompanied by messages like “The last item wasn’t scanned properly. Remove from bagging area and try again.” Similarly, Sainsbury’s has placed screens above hundreds of its self-checkout tills showing customers a feed of themselves, purportedly “to keep customers and colleagues safe,” which has met criticism that the setup is intrusive, with concerns about privacy and exposure of PIN pads.

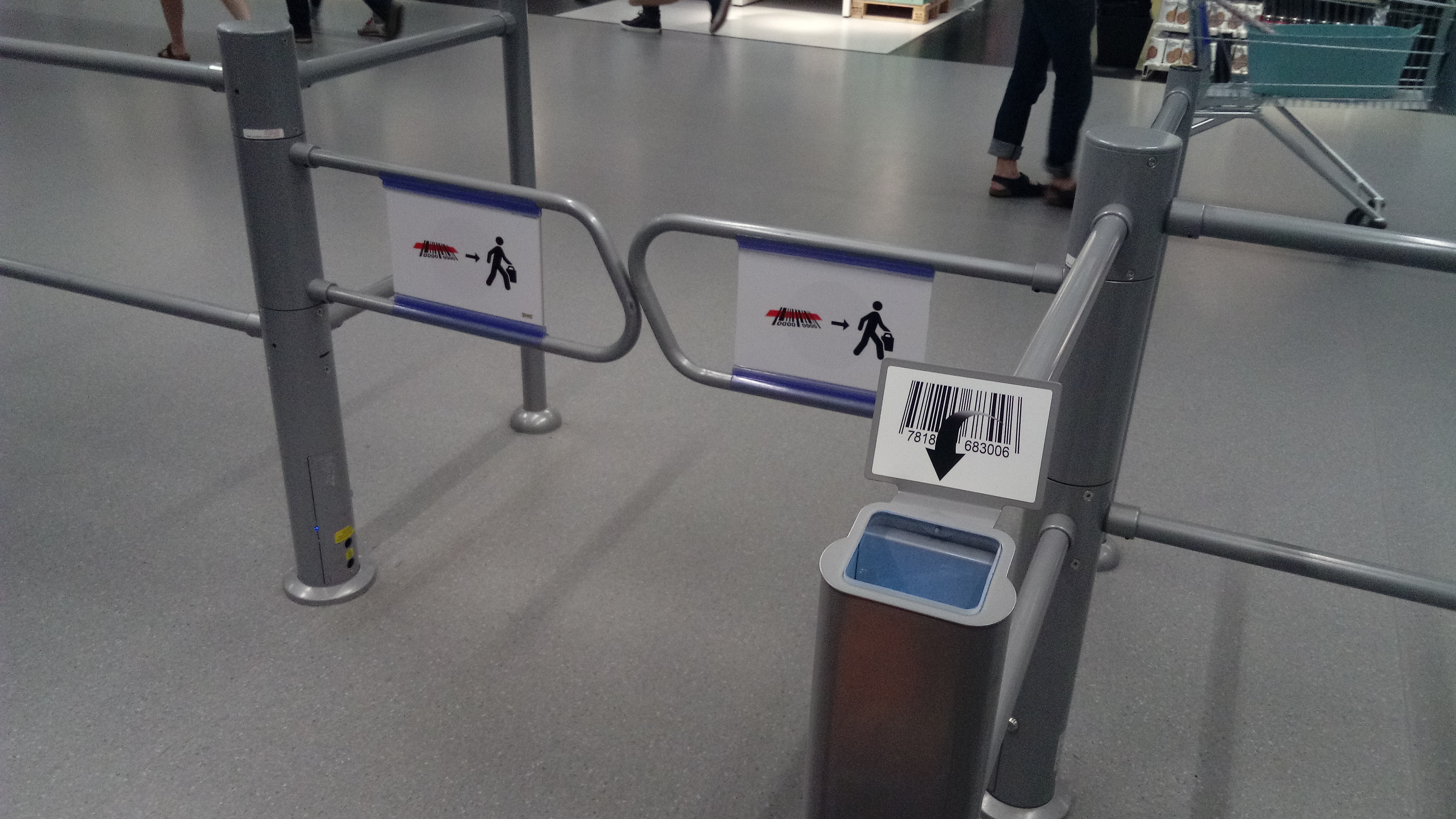
A receipt scanner gate at an IKEA store in the Netherlands

=== Receipt checks ===
==== Physical checks ====
Many retailers require customers to show their receipt to an employee to confirm they paid for the merchandise. This can be done by loss prevention officers, as at Target, or store employees, as at Walmart and Costco. Fred Meyer, an Oregon-based hypermarket, has begun to contract external security to perform receipt checks.

Certain membership stores, including Costco, require customers to comply with receipt checks as a term of their membership.

==== Receipt scanners ====
Some retailers now require customers to scan their printed receipt on an optical scanner before they can exit the store. Customers are held within a barriered area, and an automatic gate is opened by scanning the receipt as proof of purchase, allowing the customer to leave. Some supermarkets in the United Kingdom introduced receipt scanners in 2022-23, following a 22% increase in shoplifting linked to the cost-of-living crisis, but the systems proved unpopular with customers and attracted some negative public reaction.

== See also ==
- Package pilferage
- Package theft
- Retail
- Revenue protection
- Shopkeeper's privilege
- Shoplifting
- Store detective
- Tamperproofing
- Marge Be Not Proud, eleventh episode of the seventh season of the American animated television series The Simpsons, which deals with this subject.
