= Shopkeeper's privilege =

Law recognized in the United States

Shopkeeper's privilege or merchant's privilege is a law recognized in the United States under which a shopkeeper is allowed to detain a suspected shoplifter on store property for a reasonable period of time, so long as the shopkeeper has cause to believe that the person detained in fact committed, or attempted to commit, theft of store property.

== Limits ==
The privilege to detain, although recognized in many jurisdictions, is not as broad as a police officer's privilege to arrest. If the shopkeepers exceed the bounds of this privilege and make an arrest, the lawfulness of their action will be determined by the jurisdiction's rules governing arrest by a private citizen. The shopkeepers' privilege is for the purpose of investigation only; if, after reasonable detention and investigation, the shopkeepers mistakenly conclude that the suspects are guilty and have them arrested, the shopkeepers may become liable for these acts just as they would have been had they committed the acts without undertaking a prior detention and investigation. Statutes in many states have modified and in some cases broadened the common law privilege, for example, by expressly permitting detention of the suspect until the police arrive. In other cases, case precedent has provided shopkeepers with similar tools. The practical effect of these extensions is to give the shopkeeper the same privilege as a police officer to make an arrest on reasonable grounds.

== Rationale ==
This privilege has been justified by the practical need for some degree of protection for shopkeepers in their dealings with suspected shoplifters. Absent such privilege, a shopkeeper would be faced with the dilemma of either allowing suspects to leave without challenge or acting upon their suspicion and risking a false arrest.

The privilege for the most part is to be able to return the stolen goods by determining ownership. The shopkeeper may not force a confession. The shopkeeper's privilege does not include the power of search. Some courts, however, have expanded this original common law privilege to also include the detention of criminal trespassers: "[t]he detention and removal of a criminal trespasser is an essential power of any shopkeeper or other property owner[.]"

== Requisite conditions ==
In seeking to avail themself of the shopkeeper's privilege, the proprietor or agent thereof must ensure:

1. The investigation is conducted near or on the premises; the detention itself should be effected either on the store premises or in the immediate vicinity thereof. The privilege likely would not apply to after-the-fact questioning of a suspected thief who had left the store's property. While the common law does permit the owner of goods acting on fresh pursuit to use reasonable force to recapture their goods from one who actually took them wrongfully, in doing so the property owner acts at their own peril. Moreover, the investigation must be to determine ownership of the property, not to force a confession.
2. The shopkeeper has reasonable grounds to suspect the particular person detained is shoplifting.
3. Only reasonable, nondeadly force is used to effect the detention. Such force being justified when the suspect is in immediate flight or violently resists detention.
4. The detention itself lasts only the time necessary to make a reasonable investigation of the facts. Fifteen minutes may be too long where all that is necessary is to ask the cashier whether the detainee has paid.

In cases where a shopkeeper fails to satisfy the aforementioned requisite conditions, they lose the privilege and may face liability under local criminal statutes and civil torts. However, so long as these conditions are established, the shopkeeper is immune from liability for false arrest, battery, etc., even when it is discovered after the investigation that the person detained was innocent of any wrongdoing.

== Statutory analogs ==
The common law shopkeeper's privilege has been superseded in most states by so-called shoplifting statutes, or merchant's statutes, that allow merchants, their employees, and their agents to detain suspected shoplifters for: the investigation of merchandise or property ownership, the recovery of unpurchased merchandise or property, and the summoning of a police officer.

== See also ==
- Retail loss prevention
