= Shopkeeper =

One who owns or operates a small store or shop

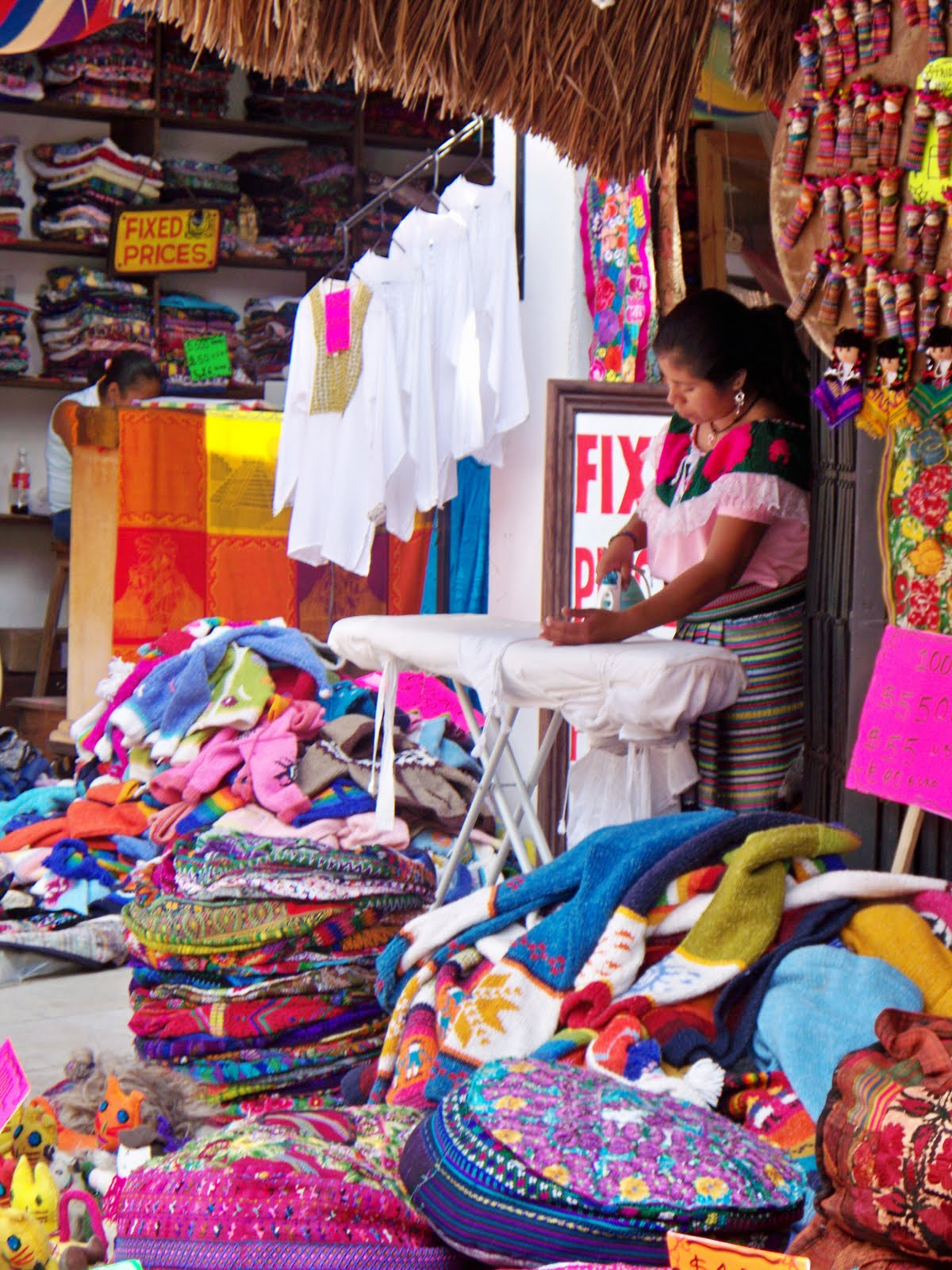
A shopkeeper in Cancún, Quintana Roo, Mexico

A shopkeeper is a retail merchant or tradesman; one who owns or operates a small store or shop. Generally, shop employees are not shopkeepers, but are often incorrectly referred to as such. At larger companies, a shopkeeper is usually referred to as a manager, since the owner is not able to manage the business being a single shopkeeper, so this term could apply to larger firms (in particular, multiple shops) generally and be a separate duty.

== Job descriptions ==
Shopkeepers may manage their own independent corner shop or run a franchise store on behalf of a retail chain (see Dealer (franchising)). Unlike store managers who usually work for a large retailer, shopkeepers normally have overall responsibility for a store. Independent shopkeepers include (but are not limited to) grocers, corner shopkeepers, newsagents, butchers, bakers, booksellers, florists, and antique dealers.

A shopkeeper may serve clients at a counter and carry out other duties such as taking customer payments, giving change, helping customers, and wrapping gifts and purchases. Most of the time, shopkeepers answer customer's enquiries, give advice about products, and listen to customers' needs and requests, which can indicate new sales opportunities. They also calculate daily takings, prepare wages, deposit cash at the bank, book-keep and take stock to ensure that the stocks are available all the time.

A shopkeeper also orders stock from wholesalers, manufacturers, agents, and importers.

== See also ==
- Family business
- Shopkeeper's privilege
- Small business
- Store manager
