= Indictable offence =

Offence which can only be tried on an indictment after a preliminary hearing

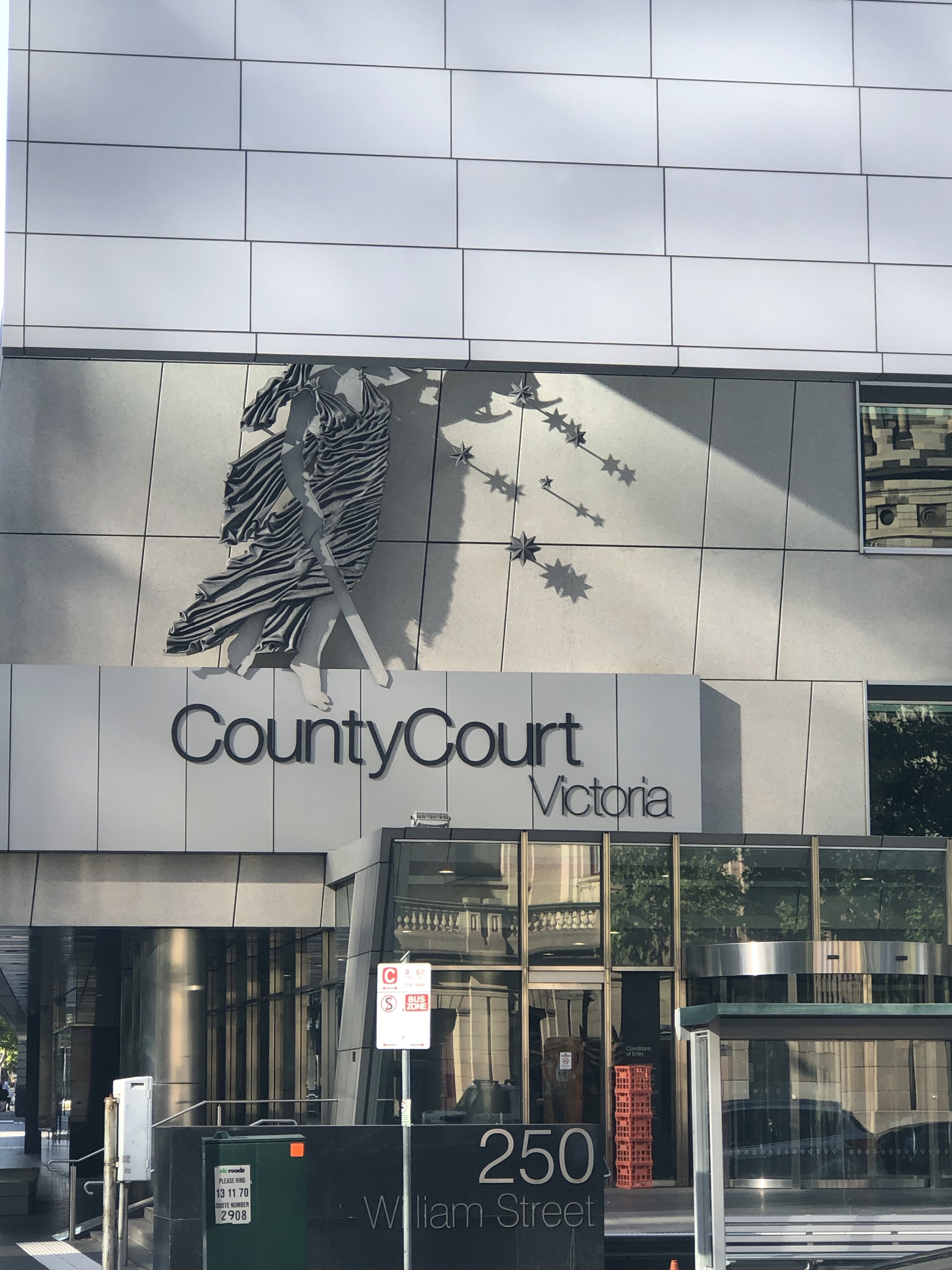
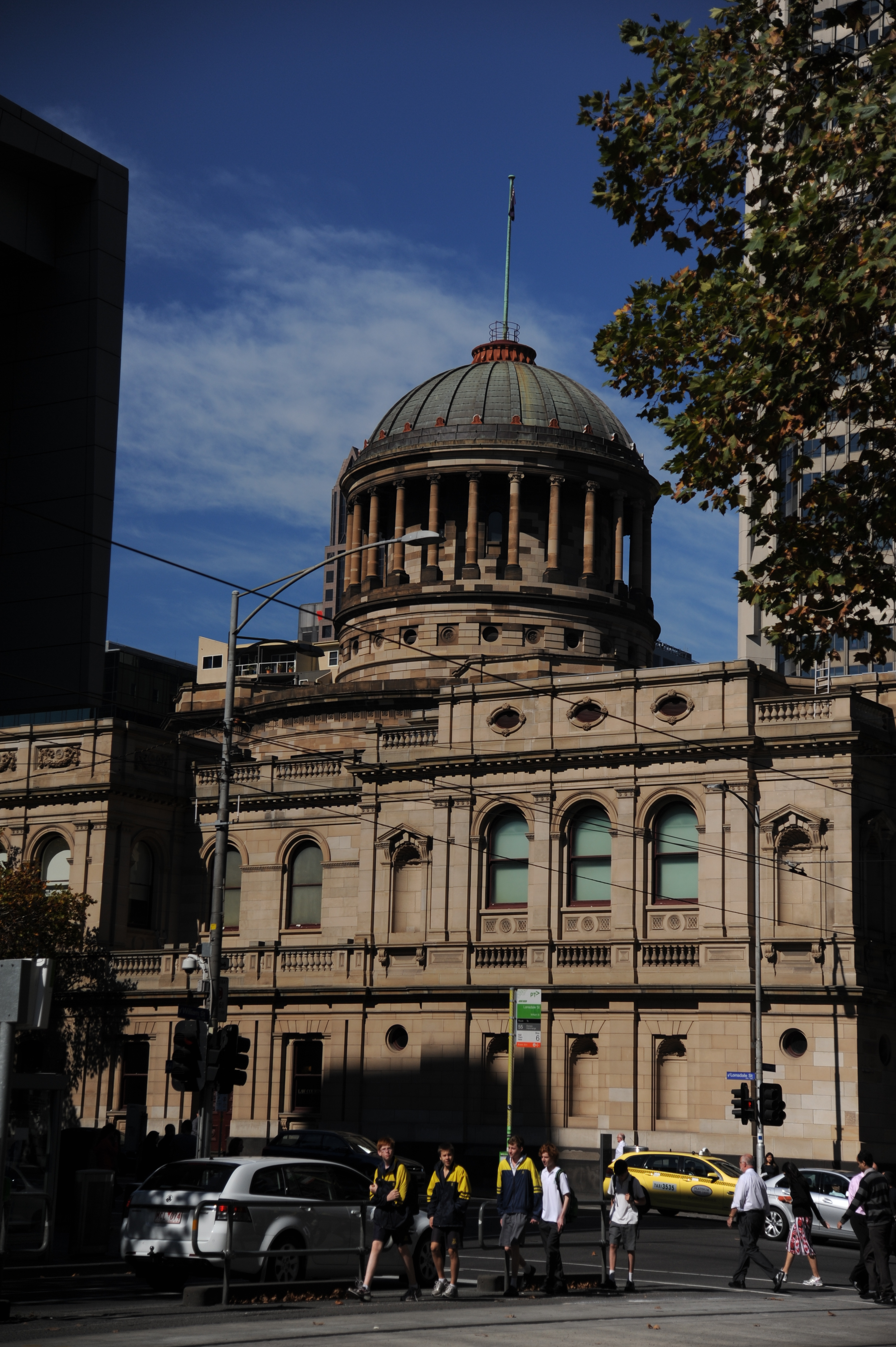
In Victoria, Australia, indictable offences are heard in either the County Court of Victoria (left) or the Supreme Court of Victoria, the latter hearing the more serious offences.

In many common law jurisdictions (e.g., England and Wales, Ireland, Canada, Hong Kong, India, Australia, New Zealand, Malaysia, Singapore), an indictable offence is an offence which can only be tried on an indictment after a preliminary hearing to determine whether there is a prima facie case to answer or by a grand jury (in contrast to a summary offence). A similar concept in the United States is known as a felony, which for federal crimes, also requires an indictment. In Scotland, which is a hybrid common law jurisdiction, the procurator fiscal will commence solemn proceedings for serious crimes to be prosecuted on indictment before a jury.

== Australia ==
In Australia, an indictable offence is more serious than a summary offence, and one where the defendant has the right to trial by jury. They include crimes such as murder, rape, and threatening or endangering life. The system is underpinned by various state and territory acts and the Commonwealth Crimes Act 1914.

In South Australia, New South Wales, and Queensland, indictable offences are further split into two categories: major indictable offences (including murder, rape, and threatening or endangering life) are heard in the state's Supreme Court, while minor indictable offences are heard in the District Court. In South Australia, minor indictable offences are generally heard in magistrates courts, although the defendant may elect to be heard in the District Court.

== Canada ==
In Canada, an indictable offence is a crime that is more serious than a summary offence. Examples of indictable offences include theft over $5,000, breaking and entering, aggravated sexual assault, and murder. Maximum penalties for indictable offences are different depending on the crime and can include life in prison. There are minimum penalties for some indictable offences.

== England and Wales ==
In relation to England and Wales, the expression indictable offence means an offence which, if committed by an adult, is triable on indictment, whether it is exclusively so triable or triable either way; and the term indictable, in its application to offences, is to be construed accordingly. In this definition, references to the way or ways in which an offence is triable are to be construed without regard to the effect, if any, of section 22 of the Magistrates' Courts Act 1980 on the mode of trial in a particular case.

An either-way offence allows the defendant to elect between trial by jury on indictment in the Crown Court and summary trial in a magistrates' court. However, the election may be overruled by the magistrates' court if the facts suggest that the sentencing powers of a magistrates' court would be inadequate to reflect the seriousness of the offence.

In relation to some indictable offences, for example criminal damage, only summary trial is available unless the damage caused exceeds £5,000.

A youth court has jurisdiction to try all indictable offences with the exception of homicide and certain firearms offences, and will normally do so provided that the available sentencing power of two years' detention is adequate to punish the offender if found guilty.

=== History ===
See section 64 of the Criminal Law Act 1977.

Grand juries were abolished in 1933.

=== Offences triable only on indictment ===
Some offences such as murder and rape are considered so serious that they can only be tried on indictment at the Crown Court where the widest range of sentencing powers is available to the judge.

The expression indictable-only offence was defined by section 51 of the Crime and Disorder Act 1998, as originally enacted, as an offence triable only on indictment. Sections 51 and 52 of, and Schedule 3 to, that Act abolished committal proceedings for such offences and made other provisions in relation to them.

When the accused is charged with an indictable-only offence, he or she will be tried in the Crown Court. The rules are different in England and Wales in respect of those under 18 years of age.

See also section 14(a) of the Criminal Law Act 1977.

== New Zealand ==
Similarly in New Zealand, a rape or murder charge will be tried at the High Court, while less serious offences such as theft will be tried at the District Court. However, the District Court can hold both jury and summary trials.

== United States ==
In the United States, federal felonies always require an indictment from a grand jury before proceeding to trial. In contrast, while misdemeanors may proceed to trial on indictment, this is not required, as they may also proceed on information or complaint. Different states have different policies; since the requirement of an indictment by grand jury is not incorporated against the states, in many states, an indictment is not required for a felony case to proceed. However, some states do still use grand jury indictments for felony-level offenses and may use other terminology. For instance, in New Jersey, whose constitution requires all "crimes" to be charged by indictment but allows lesser "offenses" not to be, felony-level offenses are commonly called "indictable offenses", including in the New Jersey Penal Code, to avoid confusion between the narrow technical definition of the word "crime" from the state's constitutional jurisprudence and the broader sense.

== See also ==
- Federal crime in the United States
- Felony
- Indictment
- Summary offence
