= James Willie (Texas politician) =

American lawyer and politician (1823–1863)

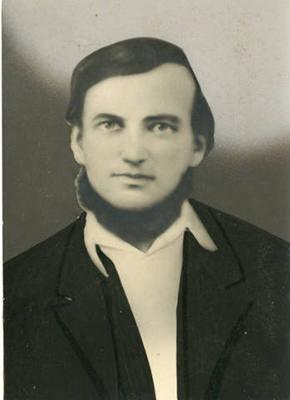

Texas Attorney General
- In office 1856–1858
- Preceded by: Thomas J. Jennings
- Succeeded by: Malcolm D. Graham

Member of the Texas House of Representatives from the Washington County district
- In office February 17, 1846 – December 13, 1847
- Preceded by: District established
- Succeeded by: Jerome B. Robertson
- In office December 13, 1847 – November 5, 1849
- Preceded by: Jerome B. Robertson
- Succeeded by: Jerome B. Robertson

Personal details
- Born: January 5, 1823 Washington, Georgia, US
- Died: 1863 (aged 39–40) Houston, Texas, US
- Resting place: Old Independence Cemetery
- Party: Democratic
- Other political affiliations: Independent
- Occupation: Lawyer, politician

Military service
- Allegiance: Confederate States of America
- Branch/service: Confederate States Army
- Years of service: 1860–1863
- Battles/wars: American Civil War

James Willie (January 5, 1823 – 1863) was an American lawyer and politician. A Democrat, he was the Texas Attorney General, as well as an independent member of the Texas House of Representatives.

== Early life ==
Willie was born on January 5, 1823, in Washington, Georgia, the son of James Willie and Caroline (née Hoxey) Willie. His brother was Asa H. Willie. He received a rudimentary education. Orphaned as a child, he moved near Independence, Texas in the early 1840s, where he lived with his uncle, Asa Hoxey.

== Career ==
Willie was an independent politician. He represented Washington County in the Texas House of Representatives, from February 17, 1846, to December 13, 1847, and again from December 13, 1847, to November 5, 1849. While serving, he was a member of the Committees on Engrossed Bills; on Finance; on Internal Improvements; on the Judiciary; on Paper Money Issued by the Republic of Texas; on Public Lands; and on Rules.

In 1847, Willie entered law partnership with his brother, in Brenham. From 1856 to 1858, he was the Texas Attorney General, now a Democrat. In 1856, Governor Elisha M. Pease appointed he, along with John Woods Harris and Oliver C. Hartley, to write Texas Penal Code, Willie being the principal author. From 1860 to 1863, during the American Civil War, he was an officer in the Confederate States Army.

== Personal life and death ==
On July 20, 1845, Willie married Sally Johnson. He fell ill in 1863, due to which he resigned from the Army. He then returned to Houston, dying there the same year, aged 39 or 40. However, The Political Graveyard states he died in 1865, which would make him aged approximately 42. He was buried at the Old Independence Cemetery. In 1936, a commemorative plaque was installed in Independence.
