= John Woods Harris =

American lawyer and politician (1810–1887)

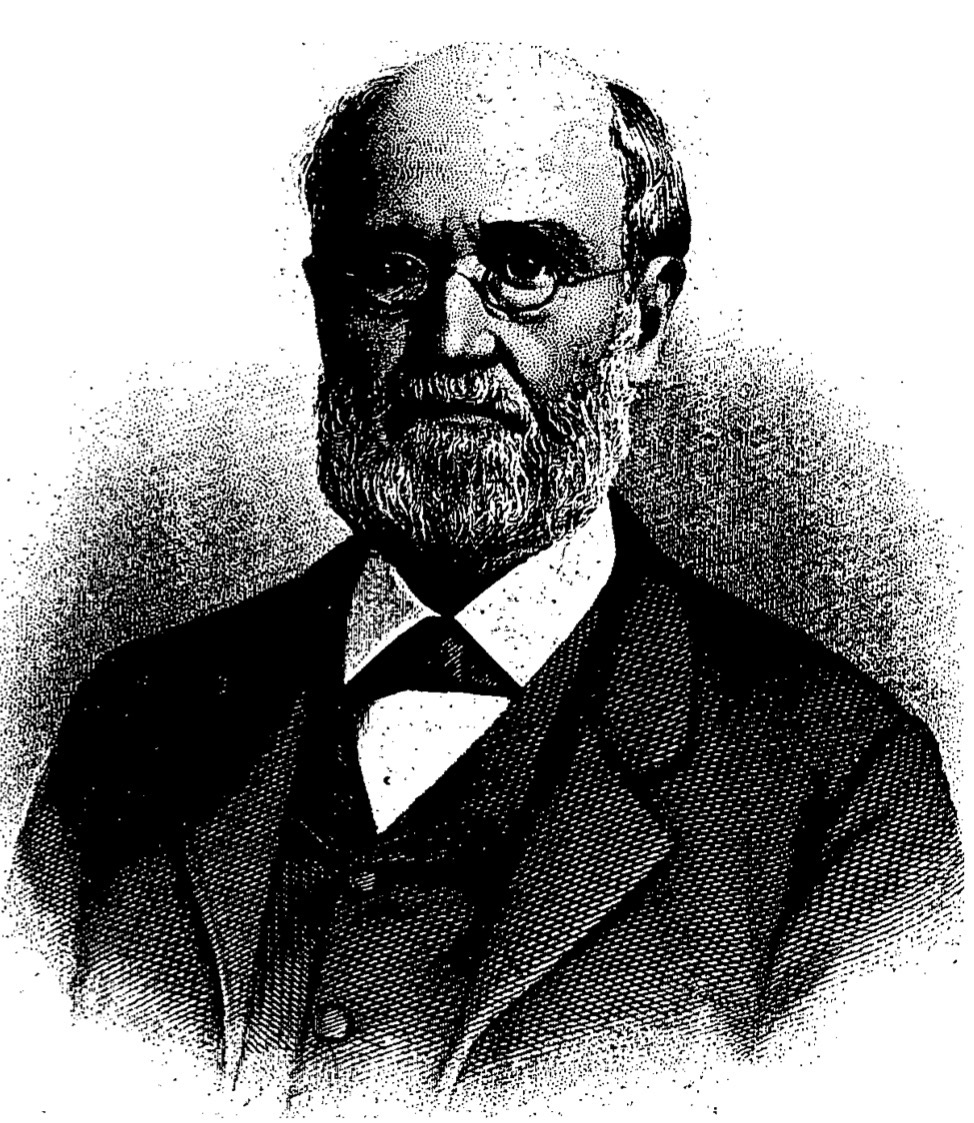
- Harris in 1885

Texas Attorney General
- In office 1846 – October 30, 1849
- Preceded by: Volney Howard
- Succeeded by: Henry Percy Brewster

Member of the Republic of Texas House of Representatives from the Brazoria County district
- In office 1839–?

Member of the Texas House of Representatives from the 12th district
- In office January 13, 1874 – April 18, 1876
- Preceded by: John Adriance
- Succeeded by: Thomas H. Young

Personal details
- Born: November 1, 1810 Nelson County, Virginia, US
- Died: April 1, 1887 (aged 76) Galveston, Texas, US
- Party: Democratic
- Relations: Samuel Rhoads Fisher (father-in-law)
- Occupation: Lawyer, politician

John Woods Harris (November 1, 1810 – April 1, 1887) was an American lawyer and politician. A Democrat, he was the Texas Attorney General, and a member of the Republic of Texas and Texas State House of Representatives.

== Early life and education ==
Harris was born on November 1, 1810, in Nelson County, Virginia, the son of English-born parents. He was educated at local rural schools. From 1829 to 1831, he studied at Washington and Lee University. He then studied at the University of Virginia, from September 1832 until 1836, graduating from six departments, including the University of Virginia School of Law.

== Career ==
In fall 1837, Harris moved to Brazoria County, Texas. By January 1 of the following year, he was in a law partnership with John A. Wharton and Elisha M. Pease. The partnership continued through Wharton's death in 1839, up until Pease was elected Governor. By dividing their work along geographical halves of Texas, the two were able to participate in all the state's most important cases, including the State Supreme Court cases.

Harris was a Democrat. In 1839, he was elected to represent Brazoria County in the Republic of Texas House of Representatives. In 1840, he introduced a bill which abolished Mexican law from Texas.

Harris served in the Texas House of Representatives, from January 13, 1874, to April 18, 1876, representing the 12th district. During his second term, he was chairman of the House Judiciary Committee, as well as a member of the Committees on Constitutional Amendments; on Federal Relations; on Internal Improvements; on Printing and Contingent Expenses; and on Rules. He was also a member of the Joint Committee on Judicial Districts.

Harris was the Texas Attorney General from 1846, until his resignation on October 30, 1849, being appointed by J. Pinckney Henderson and reappointed by George Tyler Wood. He afterwards became counsel to the Supreme Court of the United States regarding the Republic of Texas. In 1854, Governor Pease appointed he, alongside Oliver C. Hartley and James Willie, to write the Texas Penal Code. He was a Unionist and thought the American Civil War to be unnecessary, though still supported the Confederate States of America during it.

== Later career and personal life ==
Following the war, Harris moved to Galveston, where he practiced law in partnership with Marcus F. Mott, later with Branch T. Masterson. He practiced law until his death. In 1852, he married Annie Pleasants Dallam, daughter of Samuel Rhoads Fisher. They had four children together, with him also adopting a daughter of Dallam's, born prior to their marriage. He died on April 1, 1887, aged 76, in Galveston, from cardiovascular disease.
