= Ink tag =

Shoplifting prevention device

An ink tag on a pair of jeans

Ink tags are a form of retail loss prevention that is commonly used in clothing stores. These tags contain glass vials filled with permanent ink and have a thick plastic cover. The tags are attached to the items they protect with a magnetic lock which requires a special tool to remove. When forcibly removed from the item the vials of ink will shatter, releasing the ink and irreparably damaging the fabric. The tags typically have warning labels to discourage tampering. Ink tags fall into the loss prevention category called benefit denial. As the name suggests, an ink tag discourages theft by denying the shoplifter any benefit for their efforts. Ink tags are most effective if used together with another anti-shoplifting system; indeed, some ink tags contain an integrated electronic article surveillance tag.

== History ==
Ink tags were invented in 1986 by Arthur J. Minasy as an additional retail loss prevention method most often used in conjunction with another type of tag such as an RF tag. The strategy of deterring rather than preventing theft was an innovation in retail security.

== Benefits and drawbacks ==
An ink tag that has been unlocked and separated, showing the pin connector

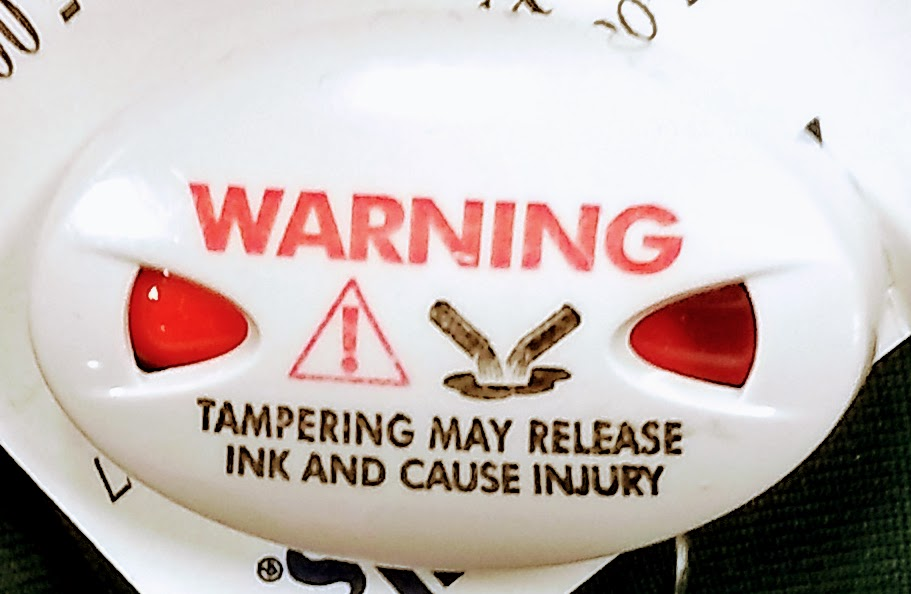
An ink tag used for retail loss prevention. It is attached to clothing, with a paper price tag underneath.

Although the use of ink tags does not prevent the theft of an item, it does strongly discourage it by decreasing the benefit received by the shoplifter. Ink tags lack the benefits of other forms of loss prevention such as RFID tags, which can prevent theft of the item by alerting the retailer. Ink tags are, however, significantly cheaper.

Shoplifters have found ways to get around ink tags by developing their own removal systems.

== See also ==
- Dye pack
- Electronic article surveillance
