= Henry Brewster =

Henry Brewster may refer to:

- Henry C. Brewster (1845–1928), U.S. Representative from New York
- Henry Percy Brewster (1816–1884), lawyer, statesman, and soldier from Texas
