= Spider wrap =

Retail security device

Spider wrap device

Spider wrap (or alarming wrap; sometimes a spider) is an electronic article surveillance device used by many retailers. It is a wired alarm that is attached to products to prevent theft. If the wire is cut, the alarm sounds. The wire is retractable, allowing the strings to be wrapped tightly around different-sized items.

== See also ==
- Ink tag
- Tattle-Tape
