= StopLift =

Retail theft prevention system

StopLift is a checkout vision system designed to prevent shoplifting and employee theft in retail businesses. StopLift, Inc., also known as StopLift Checkout Vision Systems, is the company which developed the system. StopLift, Inc. is headquartered in Cambridge, Massachusetts.

StopLift is stated to be first such system capable of successfully detecting sweethearting between cashiers and customers. ("Sweethearting" is when cashiers pretend to scan or ring up some items for favored customers, usually family or friends, while actually not charging the customer.)

Video surveillance of checkouts is common, but reviewing the resulting tapes manually is often prohibitively expensive. The new system attempts to detect unusual and possibly fraudulent behavior on the part of the cashier, such as blocking the bar code, stacking items up and just scanning the bottom item, and directly bagging the merchandise without ever scanning it. The system then highlights the place on the video where the possible theft had occurred, so that a human need only review a short segment.

In practice, many of the problems the software catches seem to be employee errors rather than intentional fraud. Some customers are using it to train or reassign employees who prove more prone to such errors.

Several grocery chains are now using the system, and others are testing it and may install it. The system is being offered on a subscription rather than a purchase basis, reducing up-front costs.

Malay Kundu, founder of StopLift Inc, began researching theft from retailers while attending Harvard Business School.
