= Timothy Pilsbury =

American politician

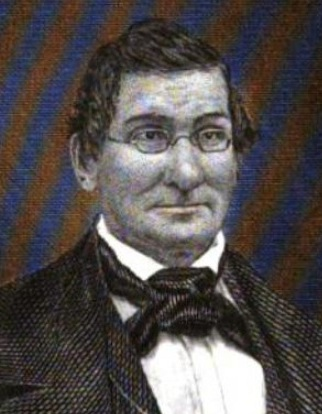

Member of the U.S. House of Representatives from Texas's 2nd district
- In office March 30, 1846 – March 3, 1849
- Preceded by: District established
- Succeeded by: Volney Howard

Member of the Maine House of Representatives
- In office 1825–1826

Personal details
- Born: April 12, 1789 Newburyport, Massachusetts, U.S.
- Died: November 23, 1858 (aged 69) Henderson, Texas, U.S.
- Party: Democratic

Timothy Pilsbury (April 12, 1789 – November 23, 1858) was a United States representative from Texas. He was born in Newburyport, Massachusetts, where he attended the common schools. He was employed in a store for about two years before he became a sailor. During the War of 1812, he commanded the privateer Yankee. After the war, he engaged in shipping and settled in Eastport, Maine.

Pilsbury served as a member of the Maine House of Representatives in 1825 and 1826 and a member of the executive council 1827–1836. He was an unsuccessful candidate for election in 1836 to the Twenty-fifth Congress. He moved to Ohio and thence to New Orleans, Louisiana, and later to Brazoria, Texas.

Pilsbury was a member of the House of Representatives of the Republic of Texas in 1840 and 1841 and served in the Senate of that Republic in 1842. He was also the chief justice of the county court and judge of probate for Brazoria County, Texas. He was again a member of the Texas Senate in 1845.

Upon the admission of Texas as a State into the Union, he was elected as a Democrat to the Twenty-ninth and Thirtieth Congresses and served from March 30, 1846, to March 3, 1849. Pilsbury was an unsuccessful candidate for reelection in 1848 to the Thirty-first Congress. He died in Henderson, Texas, in 1858 and was buried in the City Cemetery.

U.S. House of Representatives
Preceded by District created	Member of the U.S. House of Representatives from Texas's 2nd congressional district March 30, 1846 – March 3, 1849	Succeeded by Volney E. Howard
