= Yomango =

Yomango (In Spanish slang, "yo mango" means "I steal") is a shoplifting movement that originated in Barcelona (Spain) in 2002. It is billed as an anti-consumer lifestyle.

It gained publicity when clothes were stolen from a store, put on and worn back to the store in a "fashion show". Some people claim that it is intended to be a parody of the Mango clothing line popular in Europe. However, Yomango consider themselves as an informal community aimed at diffusing practices of social disobedience. The kind of shoplifting promoted by Yomango may even be a tactics of direct re-appropriation and redistribution of wealth. Yomango is connected with the European movement against labor and social instability.

== See also ==
- Illegalism
- Individual reclamation
