= Volney Howard =

American lawyer, statesman, and jurist (1809–1889)

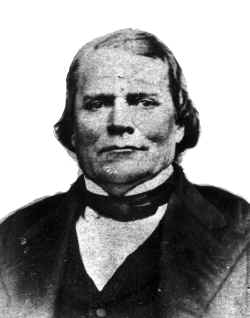

Member of the U.S. House of Representatives from Texas's 2nd district
- In office March 4, 1849 – March 3, 1853
- Preceded by: Timothy Pilsbury
- Succeeded by: Peter Hansborough Bell

Member of the Mississippi House of Representatives
- In office 1836

Personal details
- Born: Volney Erskine Howard; October 22, 1809 Norridgewock, Maine, U.S.
- Died: May 14, 1889 (aged 79) Santa Monica, California, U.S.
- Party: Democratic
- Children: 2

Volney Erskine Howard (October 22, 1809 – May 14, 1889) was an American lawyer, statesman, and jurist.

== Career ==
Volney Erskine Howard was born in Norridgewock, Somerset County, Maine on October 22, 1809, to Richard Howard, a prosperous farmer. He attended Bloomfield Academy, Skowhegan, Maine and Waterford College. At the age of 22, Howard traveled to Mississippi to study law and he commenced law practice in Brandon, Mississippi. He was a member of the Mississippi House of Representatives in 1836; reporter of the supreme court of the State of Mississippi; unsuccessful Democratic Party candidate for election in 1840 to the Twenty-seventh Congress; and editor of the Mississippian, a Democratic newspaper published at Vicksburg, Mississippi.

After his unsuccessful run in 1840, he moved to New Orleans, practicing law there until December 1844, and then moved to San Antonio to serve in the Republic of Texas. He was appointed the first Attorney General of the State of Texas in 1846 by Governor J. Pinckney Henderson, but he declined the appointment. He represented Texas's District 2 in the U.S. Congress from 1849 to 1853 but lost a third re-election bid to Peter Hansborough Bell.

Appointed attorney to the Land Commission of California by President Franklin Pierce, Howard left Texas to move to California. He resigned after a few months to practice law in San Francisco.

In 1856, he was appointed Adjutant General of California, following the resignation of William T. Sherman during the time of the San Francisco Committee of Vigilance. His attempt to oppose the Committee by force quickly failed, and he moved the same year to Sacramento.

In 1858, he moved to Oakland to resume his law practice in San Francisco, but by 1861, he decided to leave northern California entirely for Los Angeles due to lingering enmity from supporters of the Vigilance Committee.

In Los Angeles, Howard soon rose to prominence and was elected to four two-year terms as District Attorney, serving in that role from 1864 to 1867 and again from 1873 to 1876. He later served as a delegate to the second California constitutional convention in 1878–1879 and may have been its most prominent member. After the California Constitution's adoption, he and Ygnacio Sepulveda were subsequently elected in 1879 as the first two judges of the newly-created Los Angeles County Superior Court.He served only one term on the bench, due to ill health. He was later nominated to a seat on the United States Supreme Court but declined because of failing health.

In private practice, Howard's law firm included two of his lawyer sons, Charles Howard (killed in a gunfight with Daniel B. Nichols, son of a former mayor of Los Angeles, in 1869 in a saloon) and Frank H. Howard, who served as city attorney of Los Angeles. Howard was also a charter member and the vice president of the first Los Angeles Bar Association in 1878.

Howard died in Santa Monica, California on May 14, 1889 and was buried at Fort Hill Cemetery in Los Angeles, California. Howard County, Texas was named in his honor.

Legal offices
Preceded by New Position	Texas Attorney General; 1846	Succeeded by John Woods Harris
U.S. House of Representatives
Preceded by Timothy Pilsbury	Member of the U.S. House of Representatives from Texas's 2nd congressional district 1849–1853	Succeeded by Peter H. Bell
