= Booster bag =

Shoplifter's tool

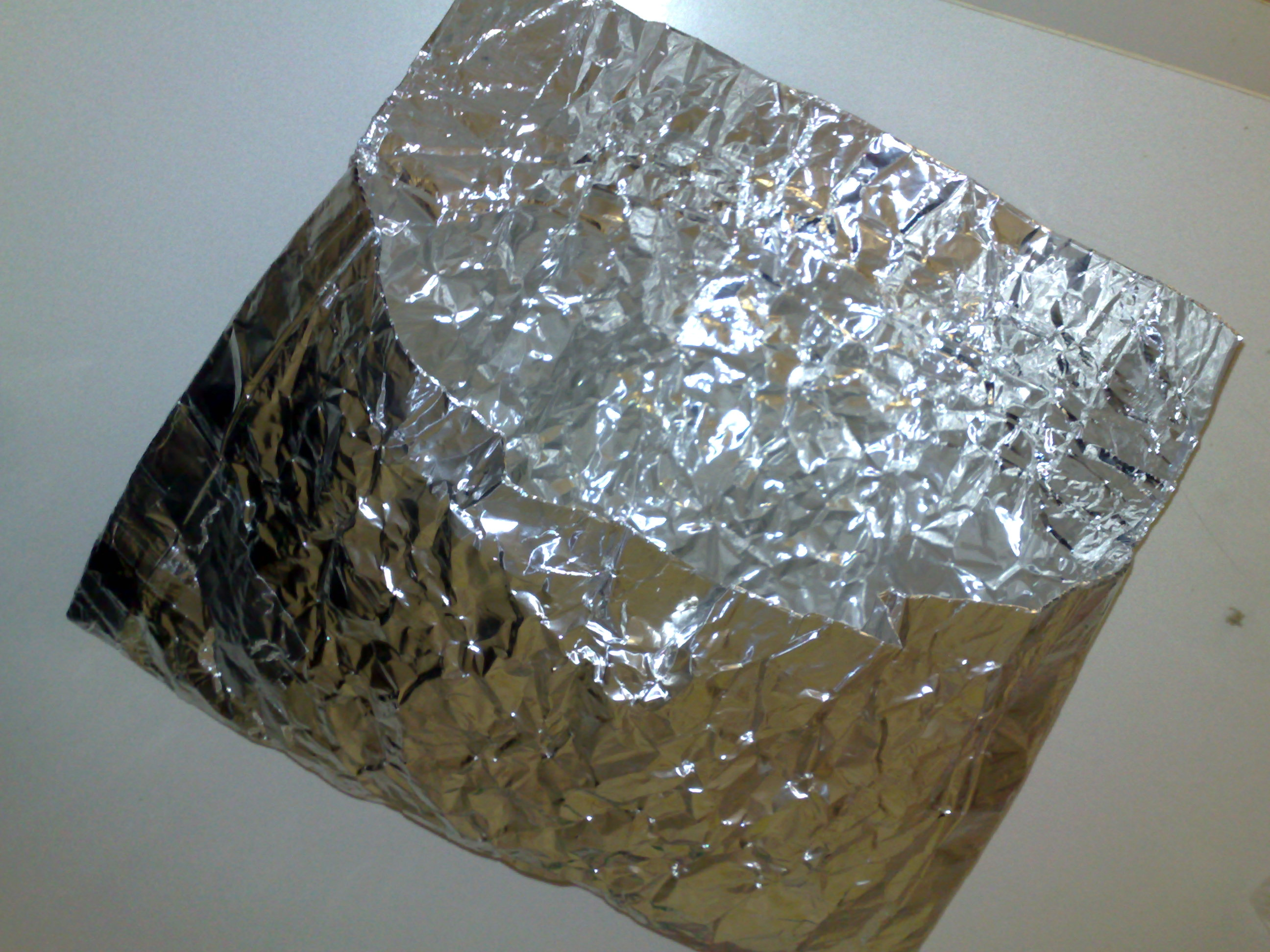
Aluminium foil bag used for shoplifting

A booster bag is a handmade bag used to shoplift, typically from retail stores, libraries, and any other location employing electronic security detectors to deter theft. The booster bag can be an ordinary shopping bag, backpack, pocketed garment, or other inconspicuous container whose inside is lined with a special conductive material, typically multiple layers of aluminium foil.

An item is placed inside the booster bag (effectively a Faraday cage). This provides electromagnetic shielding, with the result that electronic security tags inside the bag may not be detected by security coils in the detector antennas at the store exit.

Booster bags have been used by professional shoplifters for several years. Once a bag has been successfully tested, a shoplifter can steal dozens of items with very little effort. However, as electronic article systems improve, shoplifters are turning to high efficiency tag removal devices.

The name "booster bag" comes from "boost" in the slang sense of "to shoplift".

== See also ==
- Electronic article surveillance
