= Arthur Minasy =

American engineering inventor

Arthur Minasy (1925 – 9 May 1994) was an American inventor. His most famous invention was in 1966, when he invented surveillance tags that could be attached to items in stores to prevent shoplifting.

The tag is removed by a cashier once it has been paid for. If the tag is not removed, an alarm is set off when the person leaves the store.

Following the success of this, Minasy set up his own security company, The Knogo Corporation, which has produced numerous other security related items.

== Education ==
Minasy graduated from New York University with an engineering degree in 1949 and a master's degree in industrial engineering in 1952.

== See also ==
- Shop lifting
