= Electronic article surveillance =

Shoplifting prevention mechanism

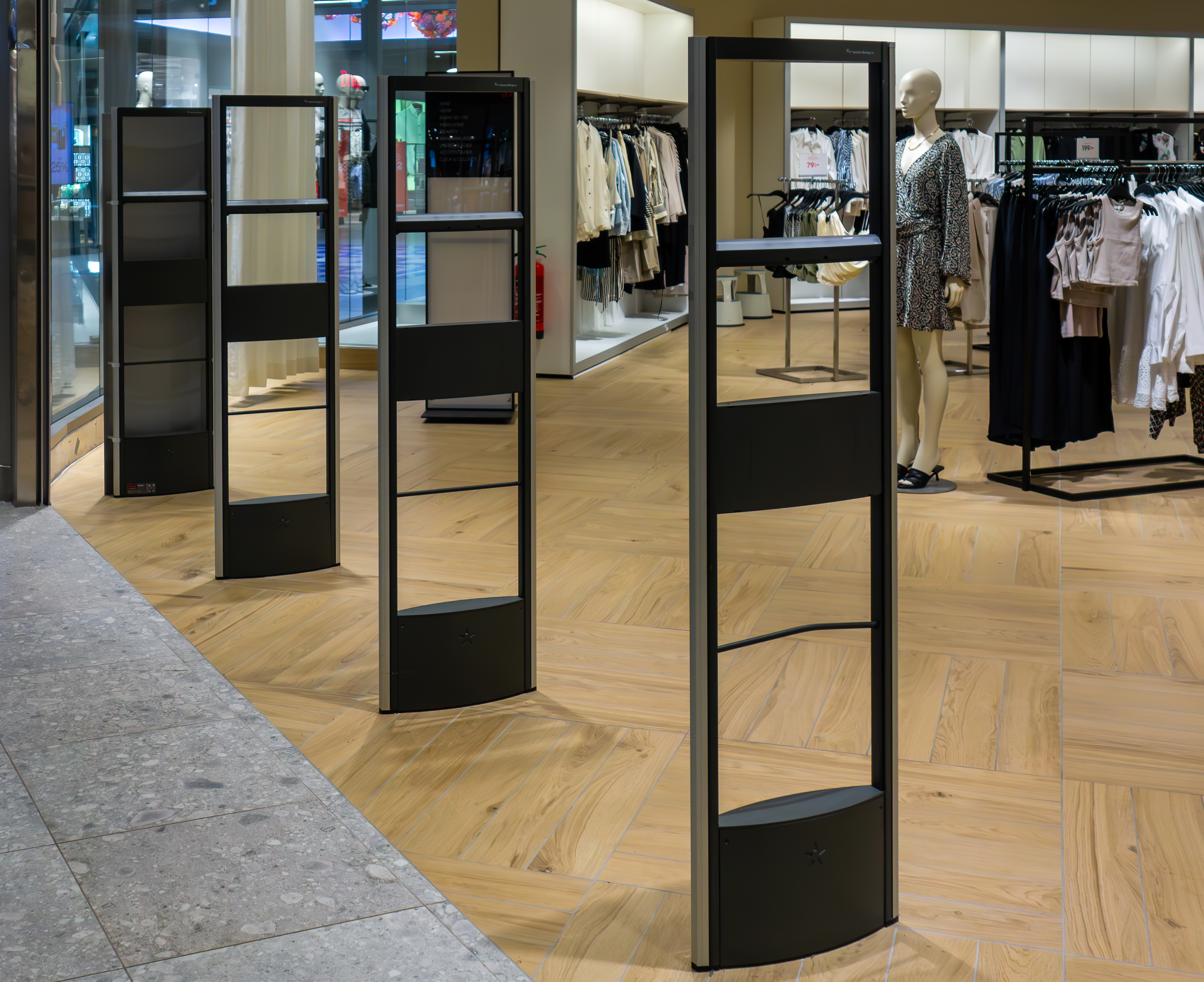
Electronic article surveillance antennas at an H&M store in Torp shopping mall, Sweden

Electronic article surveillance (EAS) is a type of system used to prevent shoplifting from retail stores, pilferage of books from libraries, or unwanted removal of property from office buildings. EAS systems typically consist of two components: EAS antennas (colloquially anti-theft detectors or towers) and EAS tags or labels (security tags or hard tags)

EAS tags are attached to merchandise; these tags should only be removed or deactivated by employees when the item is properly purchased or checked out. If merchandise bearing an active tag passes by an antenna installed at an entrance or exit, an alarm sounds alerting staff that merchandise is leaving the store unauthorized. Tags may also contain ink. Some stores also have antennas at entrances to restrooms to deter shoppers from taking unpaid-for merchandise into the restroom where they could remove the tags.

== History ==
Arthur Minasy's original patent for electronic article surveillance

EAS tags that could be attached to items in stores were invented by Arthur Minasy in 1964. He filed a patent for his "Method and Apparatus for Detecting the Unauthorized Movement of Articles" in 1965 with the patent being granted in 1970.

== Technologies ==
There are several major types of electronic article surveillance (EAS) technologies, each designed to detect unauthorized removal of merchandise or materials using different electromagnetic or acoustic principles:

- Acousto-magnetic (AM EAS; also magnetostrictive) – Uses vibrating metal strips that resonate at a specific frequency (typically 58 kHz) when exposed to an AM signal; widely used in retail stores, especially for items requiring high detection reliability.
- Electromagnetic (EM EAS; also magneto-harmonic) – Via the Barkhausen effect, uses amorphous metal strips that respond to low-frequency magnetic fields; particularly suited for libraries, pharmacies, and applications involving small or metallic items.
- Microwave EAS – Less common today, uses microwave energy combined with RF fields to detect tagged items; generally more expensive and were mostly deployed in niche applications.
- Radio frequency (RF EAS) – Detects resonant circuits within tags, usually operating at 8.2 MHz; commonly used in clothing stores, supermarkets, and environments with less metallic or liquid interference.

Except for microwave EAS, the detection rate depends on tag orientation relative to the detection loops. For a pair of planar loops forming a Helmholtz coil, magnetic field lines will be approximately parallel in their center. Orienting the tag so that no magnetic flux from the coils crosses them will prevent detection, as the tag will not be coupled to the coils. This shortcoming, documented in the first EAS patents, can be solved by using multiple coils or by placing them in another arrangement such as a figure-of-eight. Sensitivity will still be orientation-dependent but detection will be possible at all orientations.

=== Acousto-magnetic ===
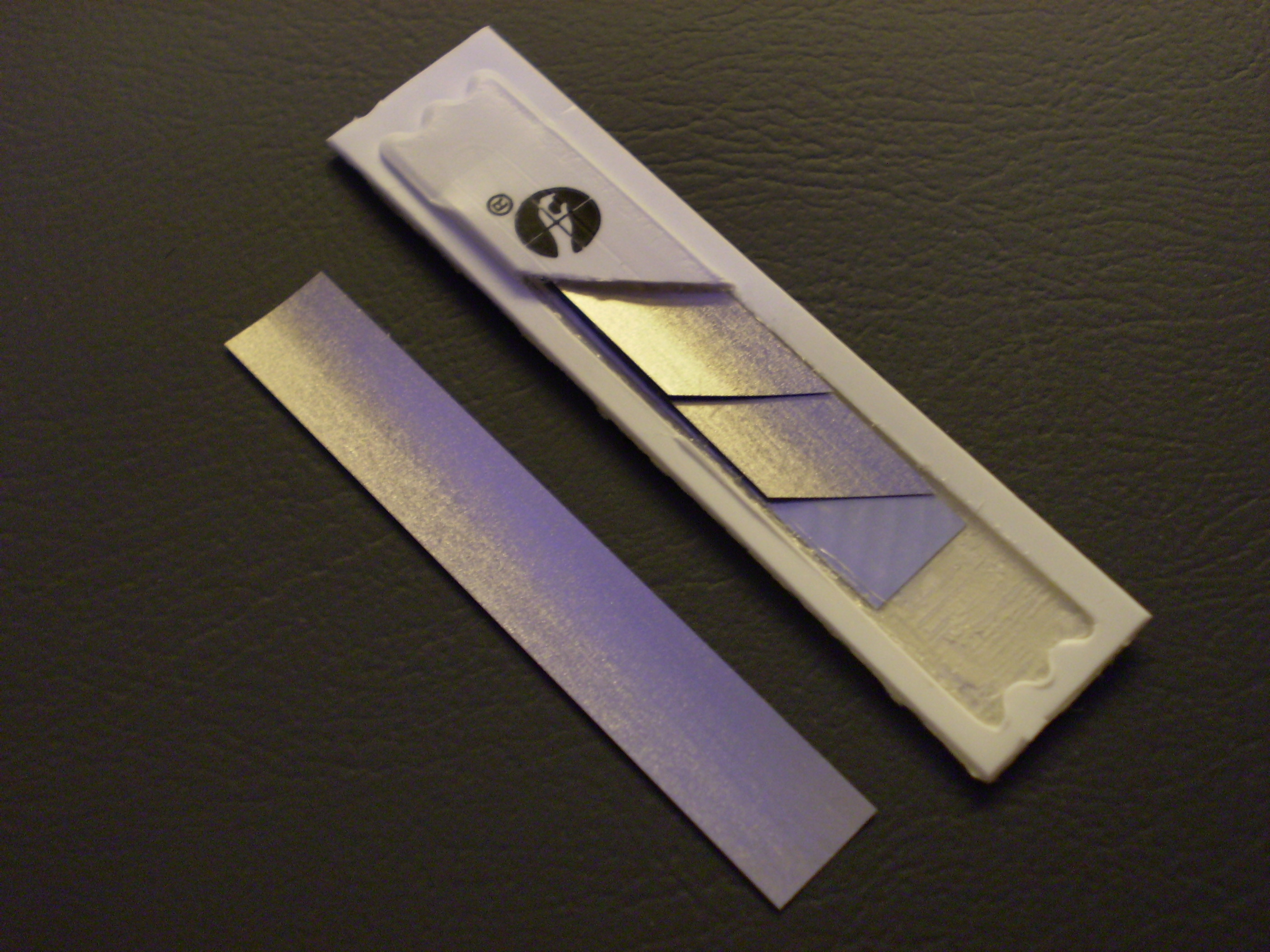
A cutaway image of an acousto-magnetic tag.

Acousto-magnetic or magnetostrictive systems are similar to magnetic tags in that they are made of two strips: a strip of magnetostrictive, ferromagnetic amorphous metal and a strip of a magnetically semi-hard metallic strip, which is used as a biasing magnet (to increase signal strength) and to allow deactivation. These strips are not bound together but free to oscillate mechanically.

Amorphous metals are used in such systems due to their good magnetoelastic coupling, as they can efficiently convert magnetic energy into mechanical vibrations.

The detectors for such tags emit periodic tonal bursts at about 58 kHz, the same as the resonance frequency of the amorphous strips. This causes the strip to vibrate longitudinally by magnetostriction, and it continues to oscillate after the burst is over. The vibration causes a change in magnetization in the amorphous strip, which induces an AC voltage in the receiver antenna. If this signal meets the required parameters (correct frequency, repetition, etc.), the alarm is activated.

When the semi-hard magnet is magnetized, the tag is activated. The magnetized strip makes the amorphous strip respond much more strongly to the detectors, because the DC magnetic field given off by the strip offsets the magnetic anisotropy within the amorphous metal. The tag can also be deactivated by demagnetizing the strip, making the response small enough so that it will not be detected by the detectors.

AM tags are three-dimensional plastic tags, much thicker than electro-magnetic strips, and are thus seldom used for books.

=== Electromagnetic ===
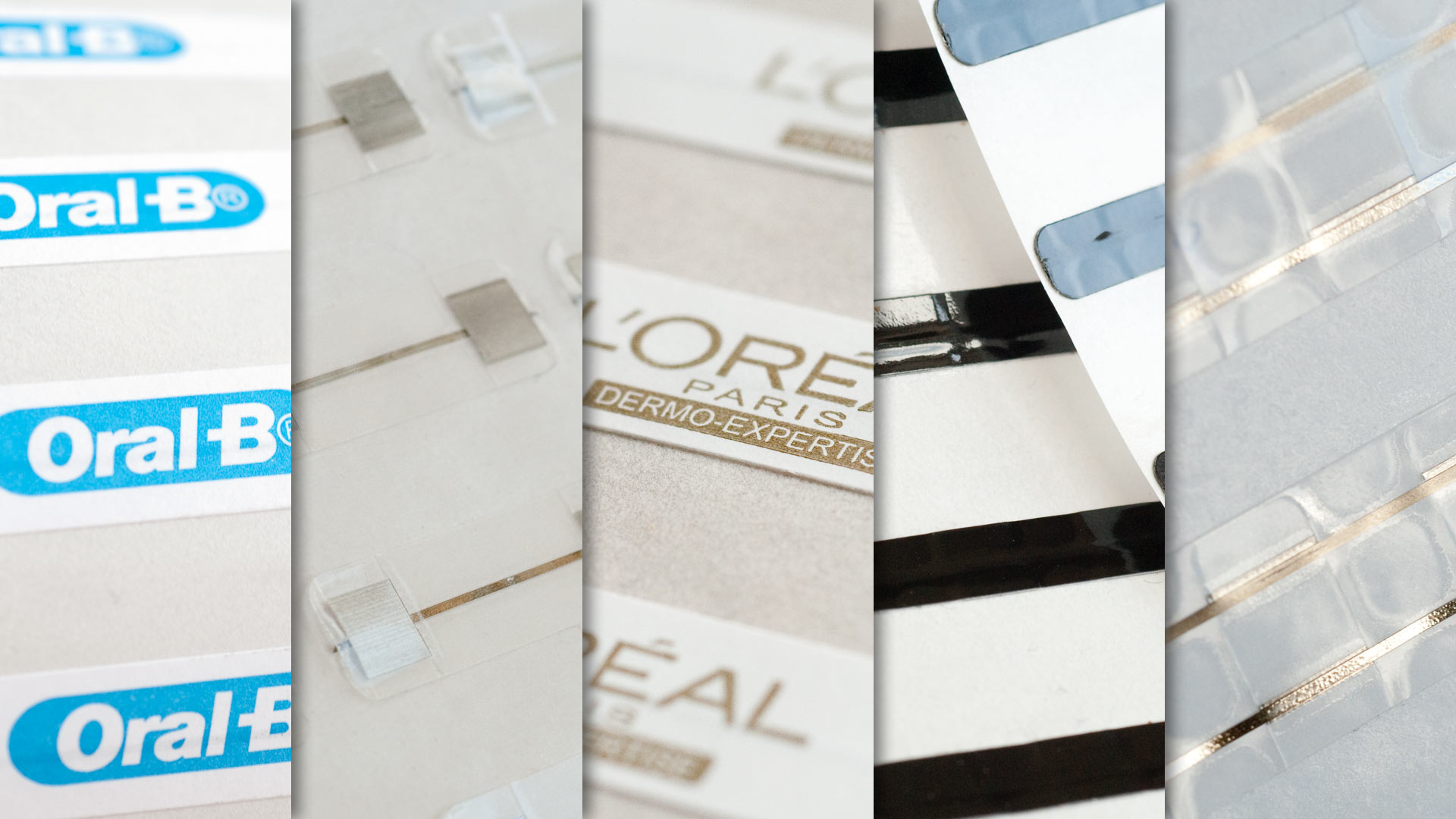
EM labels in different sizes and colors.

Electromagnetic article surveillance (EM EAS) tags use a strip of amorphous metal (typically Metglas) paired with a layer of ferromagnetic material. This design allows repeated activation and deactivation.

When exposed to low-frequency alternating magnetic fields (10–1,000 Hz), the tag emits harmonic signals due to its nonlinear magnetic behavior. These signals are detected by antennas placed at exits or secure zones.

Magnetizing the ferromagnetic layer biases the amorphous strip into saturation, which suppresses signal generation and deactivates the tag. Demagnetizing it restores detectability. EM EAS systems function reliably on metal surfaces, foil packaging, and small or curved items, in environments where other technologies, such as RF or RFID, may perform less effectively.

Electromagnetic (EM) EAS systems are widely used in libraries to secure books with tattle tapes, DVDs, and other media items. These systems support high-frequency reactivation and deactivation cycles, making them ideal for frequent circulation environments. Tattle tapes are thin electromagnetic security strips embedded in or attached to media, triggering alarms if items are removed without proper checkout.

In retail environments, EM EAS tags provide effective protection for a broad range of products, including small, curved, or metallic items such as cosmetics, infant formula cans, pharmaceuticals, DIY tools, and household appliances. EM technology is particularly effective in detecting items concealed within foil-lined bags or metal briefcases, helping to counter sophisticated shoplifting techniques such as booster bag theft.

Document protection is another key application: EM elements can be embedded in Security paper to protect sensitive hardcopy materials such as trade secrets or classified government files. These embedded microwires are detectable by EM gates or metal detectors, and some printers are configured to work only with certified paper.

=== Microwave ===
These permanent tags are made of a non-linear element (a diode) coupled to one microwave and one electrostatic antenna. At the exit, one antenna emits a low-frequency (about 100 kHz) field, and another one emits a microwave field. The tag acts as a mixer re-emitting a combination of signals from both fields. This modulated signal triggers the alarm. These tags are permanent and somewhat costly. They are mostly used in clothing stores and have practically been withdrawn from use.

=== Radio frequency ===
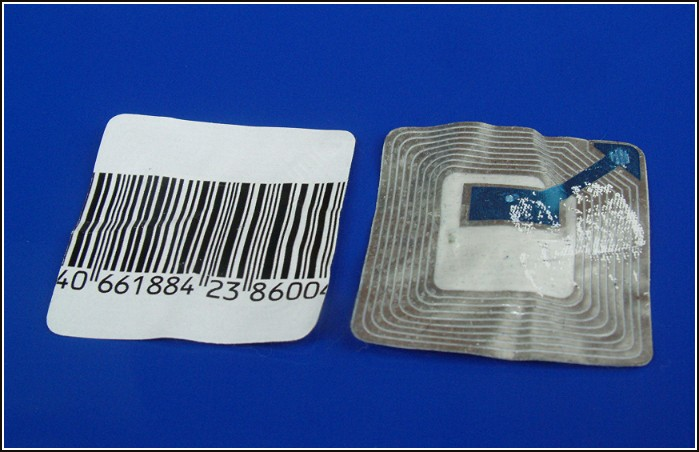
RF label

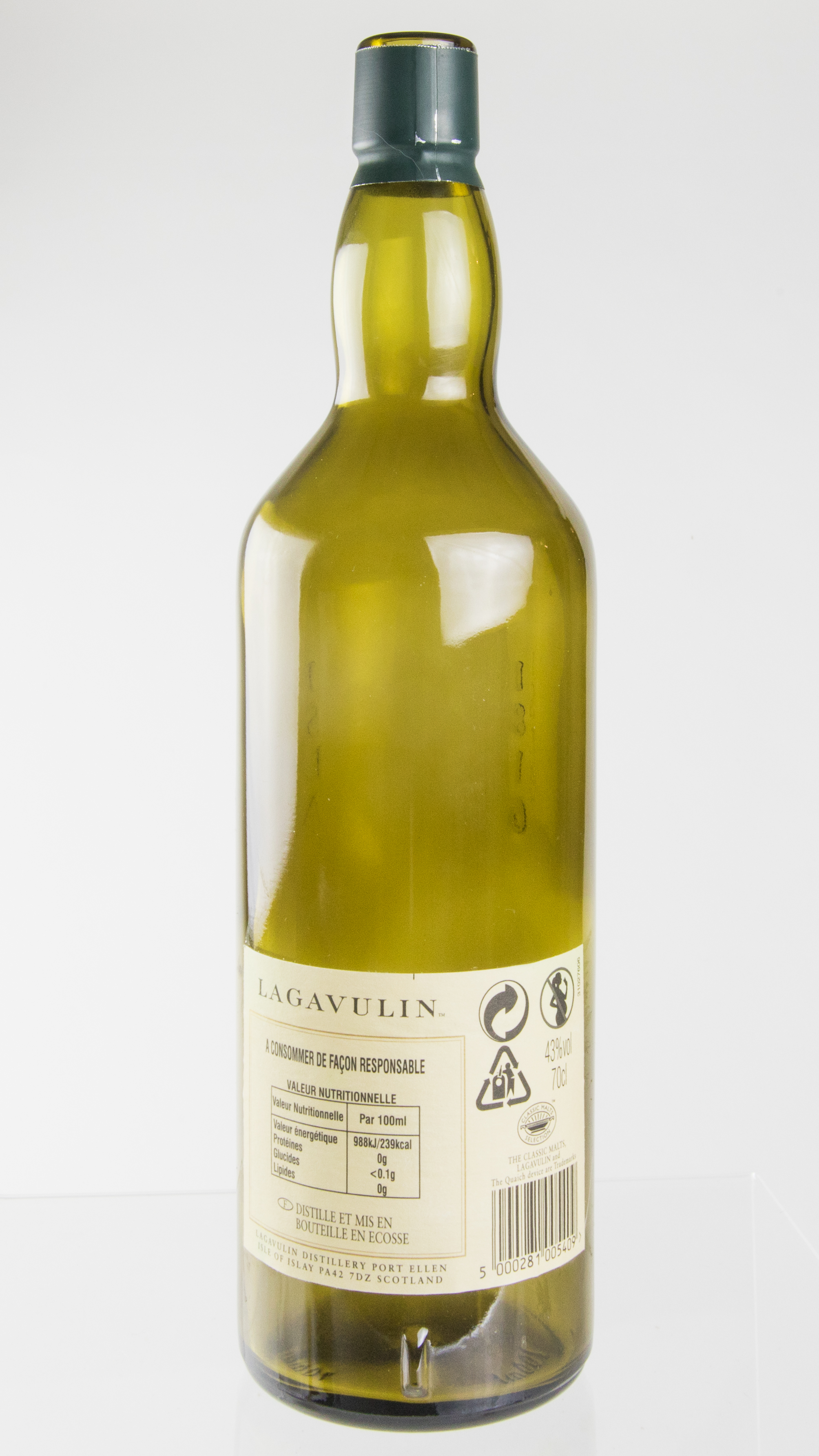
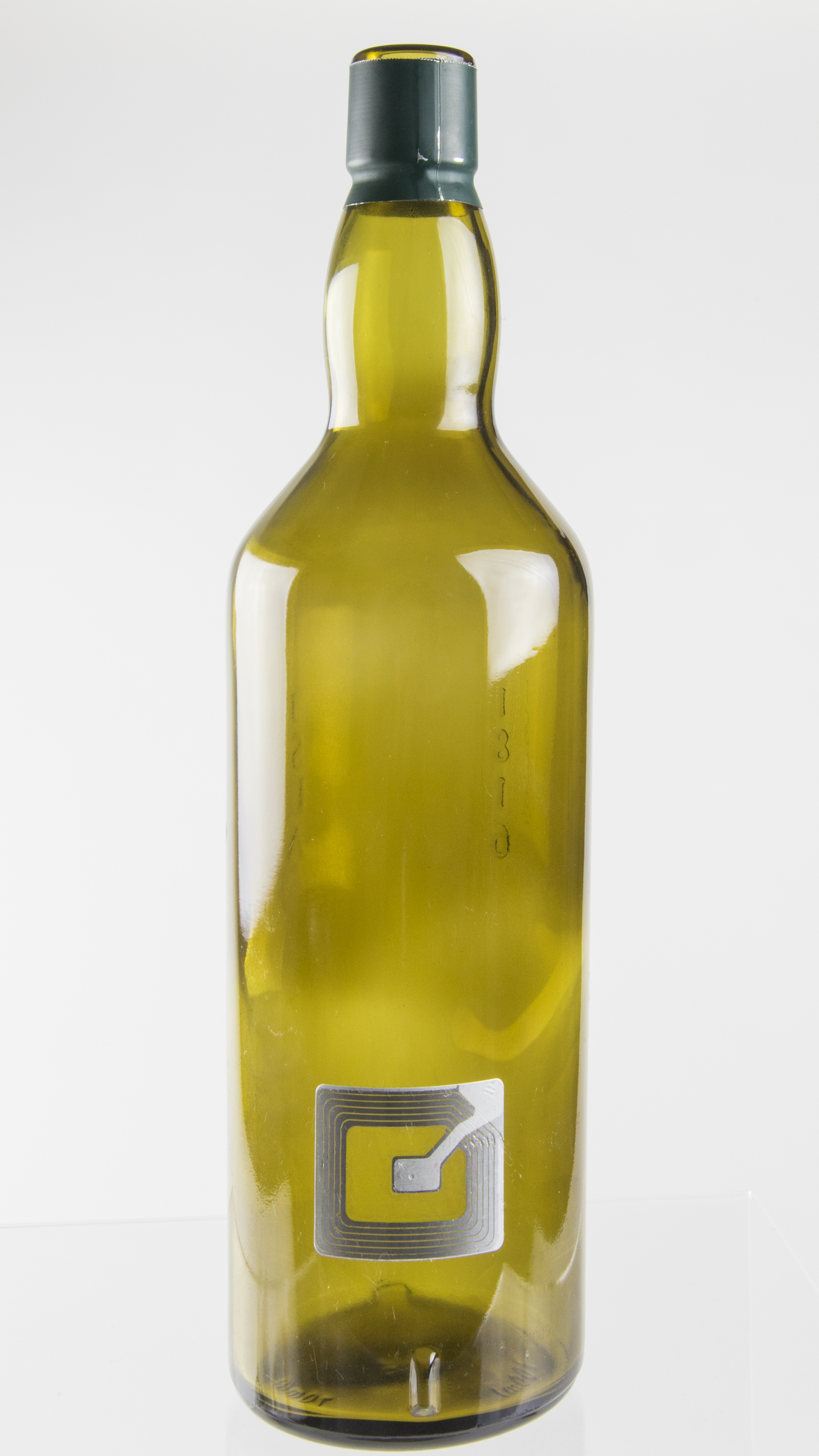
RF tag placed under the label of a liquor bottle

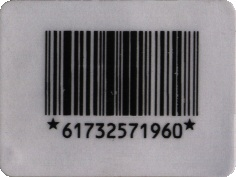
Series 304 RF EAS label

These tags are essentially an LC tank circuit (L for inductor, C for capacitor) that has a resonance peak anywhere from 1.75 MHz to 9.5 MHz. The standard frequency for retail use is 8.2 MHz. Sensing is achieved by sweeping around the resonant frequency and detecting the dip.

Deactivation for 8.2 MHz label tags is typically achieved using a deactivation pad. In the absence of such a device, labels can be rendered inactive by punching a hole, or by covering the circuit with a metallic label, a "detuner". The deactivation pad functions by partially destroying the capacitor. Though this sounds violent, in reality, both the process and the result are unnoticeable to the naked eye. The deactivator causes a micro short circuit in the label. This is done by submitting the tag to a strong electromagnetic field at the resonant frequency, which induces voltages exceeding the capacitor's breakdown voltage.

In terms of deactivation, radio frequency is the most efficient of the three technologies (RF, EM, AM – there are no microwave labels) given that the reliable "remote" deactivation distance can be up to 30 cm (11.8 in). It also benefits the user in terms of running costs, since the RF de-activator only activates to send a pulse when a circuit is present. Both EM and AM deactivation units are on all the time and consume considerably more electricity. The reliability of "remote" deactivation (i.e. non-contact or non-proximity deactivation) capability makes for a fast and efficient throughput at the checkout.

Deactivation of RF labels is also dependent on the size of the label and the power of the deactivation pad (the larger the label, the greater the field it generates for deactivation to take place. For this reason very small labels can cause issues for consistent deactivation). It is common to find RF deactivation built into barcode flat and vertical scanners at the POS in food retail especially in Europe and Asia where RF EAS technology has been the standard for nearly a decade. In apparel retail deactivation usually takes the form of flat pads of approx. 30x30 cm.

== Detectors ==
EAS antennas are also known as anti-theft detectors or "towers".

=== Concealed systems ===
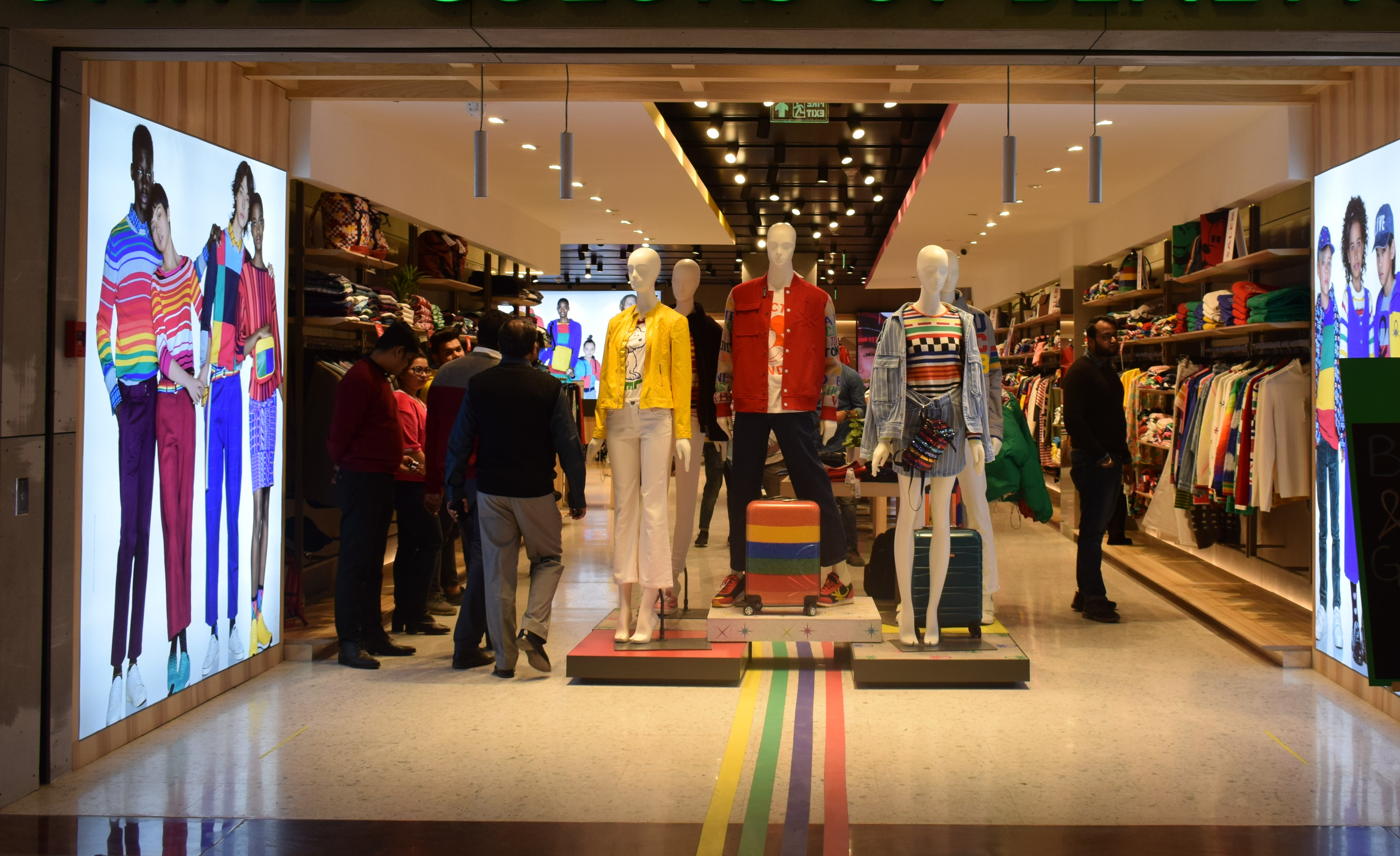
A concealed EAS system with antennas hanging above the entrance

Concealed EAS systems have no visible pedestals or hindrance in the store facade. These systems are built into floors, door frames, or shelving, or dropped from the ceiling. There are site conditions and other parameters which enable them to be installed, but often malls insist on concealed system as a mandate to improve the shopping experience. They are used in high-end retail and aesthetic-sensitive environments.

=== Installation costs ===
A single EAS detector, suitable for a small shop, is accessible to all retail stores, and should form a part of any coherent loss or profit protection system.

Disposable tags cost a matter of cents and may have been embedded during manufacture. More sophisticated systems are available, which are more difficult to circumvent. These solutions tend to be product category specific as in the case of high value added electronics and consumables; consequently they are more expensive.

== Labels ==
=== Electro-magnetic activation and deactivation ===
Deactivation of magnetic tags is achieved by straightforward magnetization using a strong magnet. Magneto-acoustic tags require demagnetization. However, sticking a powerful magnet on them will bias disposable magnetic tags and prevent resonance in magneto-acoustic tags. Similarly, sticking a piece of metal, such as a large coin on a disposable radio-frequency tag will shield it. Non-disposable tags require stronger magnets or pieces of metal to disable or shield since the strips are inside the casing and thus further away.

== Tags ==
A pile of EAS hard tags

Larger, re-usable tags known as "hard tags" (sometimes "benefit denial tags") are common in retail environments.

=== Alarms ===
Tags such as spider wrap can be equipped with a built-in alarm which sounds when the tag detects tampering or unauthorized removal from the store. The tag not only triggers the store's electronic article surveillance system, but also sounds an alarm attached to the merchandise. The local alarm continues to sound for several minutes after leaving the store, attracting attention to the shopper carrying the merchandise.

=== Detaching ===
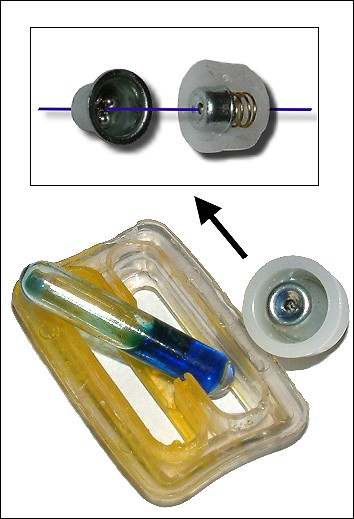
A pin mechanism inside of a hard tag

A detacher is used to remove re-usable hard tags, while the type will depend on the type of tag.

There are a variety of detachers available, with the majority using powerful magnets. Many hard tags and ink tags are secured with a pin held in place by bearing balls, which are kept under tension by a spring. A magnet strong enough to overcome the force of the spring will compress it, freeing the balls and allowing the pin to move.

Any store that uses an anti-shoplifting system and has a detacher should take care to keep it secured such that it cannot be removed. Some detachers have security tags inside them to alert store personnel of them being removed from (or brought into) the store. With increasing prevalence, stores have metal detectors at the entrance that can warn against the presence of booster bags or detachers.

=== Source tagging ===
Source tagging is the application of EAS security tags at the source, the supplier or manufacturer, instead of at the retail side of the chain. For the retailer, source tagging eliminates the labor expense needed to apply the EAS tags themselves, and reduces the time between receipt of merchandise and when the merchandise is ready for sale. For the supplier, the main benefit is the preservation of the retail packaging aesthetics by easing the application of security tags within product packaging. Source tagging allows the EAS tags to be concealed and more difficult to remove.

The high-speed application of EAS labels, suited for commercial packaging processes, was perfected via modifications to standard pressure-sensitive label applicators. Today, consumer goods are source tagged at high speeds with the EAS labels incorporated into the packaging or the product itself.

The most common source tags are AM strips and 8.2 MHz radio frequency labels. Most manufacturers use both when source tagging in the USA. In Europe there is little demand for AM tagging given that the Food and Department Store environments are dominated by RF technology.

=== Tag pollution ===
One significant problem from source tagging is something called "tag pollution" caused when non-deactivated tags carried around by customers cause unwanted alarms, decreasing the effectiveness and integrity of the EAS system. The problem is that no store has more than one system. Therefore, if a store actually has an anti-shoplifting system to deactivate a label they will only deactivate the one that is part of their system. If a store does not use an EAS system, they will not deactivate any tags at all. This is often the reason why people trigger an alarm entering a store, which can cause great frustration for both customers and staff.

=== Types of tags ===
Hard tags exist in many different formats. Electronic merchandise security systems allow phones and tablets to be used securely in the store before purchase. All of these require specific detachers or electronic keys at the point-of-sale desk. They have the advantages of being reusable, strong visual deterrents to potential theft.

==== Bottle tag ====
A bottle tag or bottle cap tag is designed to fit over the top of a bottle of wine or other drink.

==== Ink tag ====
An ink tag that has been unlocked and separated, showing the pin connector

EAS technology can be combined with ink tags, which spill permanent dye when broken apart.

==== Safer ====
A "safer" or safer box (sometimes called an anti-theft box or a "keeper") is a transparent plastic secure box or tube that completely encloses the article to be protected. Other varieties may be adjustable in order to fit around various products, or made to fit specific items such as CDs or DVDs. Safers may include an integrated tab to hang on a peg hook.

==== Spider wrap ====
Spider wrap or alarming wrap features cables that go around the packaging which are connected to a wired alarm; if the wire is cut, the alarm sounds.

==== Sports ====
Specialized tags that fit around baseball bats, golf clubs, and tennis racquets are produced for sports retailers.

== Shoplifting ==
=== Occasional versus professional shoplifters ===
EAS systems can provide a solid deterrent against casual theft. The occasional shoplifter, not being familiar with these systems and their mode of operation, will either get caught by them, or preferably, will be dissuaded from attempting any theft in the first place.

Informed shoplifters are conscious of how tags can be removed or deactivated. A common method of defeating RF tags is the use of so-called booster bags. These are typically large paper bags that have been lined with multiple layers of aluminium foil to effectively shield the RF label from detection, much like a Faraday cage. A similar situation would be the loss of signal that a cell phone suffers inside an elevator: The electro-magnetic, or radio waves are effectively blocked, reducing the ability to send or receive information.

However, they may miss some tags or be unable to remove or deactivate all of them, especially if concealed or integrated tags are used. As a service to retailers, many manufacturers integrate security tags in the packaging of their products, or even inside the product itself, though this is rare and not especially desirable either for the retailer or the manufacturer. The practical totality of EAS labels are discarded with the product packaging. This is of particular application in everyday items that consumers might carry on their person to avoid the inconvenience of potentially live reactivated EAS tags when walking in and out of retail stores.

Hard tags, typically used for clothing or ink tags, known as benefit denial tags, may reduce the rate of tag manipulation. Also, shoplifters deactivating or detaching tags may be spotted by the shop staff.

Shoplifting tools are illegal in many jurisdictions, and can, in any case, serve as evidence against the perpetrators. Hence, informed shoplifters, although they decrease their risk of being caught by the EAS, expose themselves to much greater judicial risks if they get caught with tools, booster bags, or while trying to remove tags, as this shows intent to steal.

The possession of shoplifting tools (e.g. lined bags or wire cutters to cut bottle tags) can lead to the suspect being arrested for suspicion of theft or "Going equipped for stealing, etc." within the UK judicial system.

In summary, while even the least expensive EAS systems will catch most occasional shoplifters, a broader range of measures are still required for an effective response that can protect profits without impeding sales.

=== Shielding ===
Most systems can be circumvented by placing the tagged goods in a bag lined with aluminum foil. The booster bag will act as a Faraday cage, shielding the tags from the antennas. Although some vendors claim that their acousto-magnetic systems cannot be defeated by bags shielded with aluminum foil, a sufficient amount of shielding (in the order of 30 layers of standard 20 μm foil) will defeat all standard systems.

Although the amount of shielding required depends on the system, its sensitivity, and the distance and orientation of the tags relative to its antennas, total enclosure of tags is not strictly necessary. Indeed, some shoplifters use clothes lined with aluminum foil. Low-frequency magnetic systems will require more shielding than radio-frequency systems due to their use of near-field magnetic coupling. Magnetic shielding, with steel or mu-metal, would be more effective, but also cumbersome and expensive.

The shielding technique is well known amongst shoplifters and store owners. Some countries have specific laws against it. In any case, possession of such a bag demonstrates a prior-intent to commit a crime, which in many jurisdictions raises shoplifting from misdemeanor to felony status, because they are considered a "burglary tool."

To deter the use of booster bags, some stores have add-on metal detector systems which sense metallic surfaces.

=== Jamming ===
Like most systems that rely on transmission of electromagnetic signals through a hostile medium, EAS sensors can be rendered inoperative by jamming. As the signals from tags are very low-power (their cross-section is small, and the exits are wide), jamming requires little power. Evidently, shoplifters will not feel the need to follow radio transmission regulations; hence crude, easy-to-build transmitters will be adequate for them. However, due to their high frequency of operation, building a jammer can be difficult for microwave circuits; these systems are therefore less likely to be jammed. Although jamming is easy to perform, it is also easy to detect. A simple firmware upgrade should be adequate for modern DSP-based EAS systems to detect jamming. Nevertheless, the vast majority of EAS systems do not currently detect it.

== Interference and health issues ==
All electronic article surveillance systems emit electromagnetic energy and thus can interfere with electronics.

Magneto-harmonic systems need to bring the tags to magnetic saturation and thus create magnetic fields strong enough to be felt through a small magnet. They routinely interfere with CRT displays. Demagnetization-remagnetization units also create intense fields. Acousto-magnetic systems use less power but their signals are pulsed in the 100 Hz range. Radio-frequency systems tend to be the least interfering because of their lower power and operating frequency in the MHz range, making it easy to shield against them.

A March 2007 study by the Mayo Clinic in Rochester, Minnesota, reported instances where acousto-magnetic EAS systems located at the front of retail stores caused a pacemaker to fail and a defibrillator to trigger, shocking the persons in which they were implanted.

There are also concerns that some installations are intentionally reconfigured to exceed the rated specifications by the manufacturer, thereby exceeding tested and certified magnetic field levels.

== See also ==
- Active packaging
- Barkhausen effect
- Evaluation of binary classifiers
- Ink tag
- Radio-frequency identification
- Spider wrap
- Tattle-Tape
