= Henry Percy Brewster =

American politician

Henry Percy Brewster (also Persy; November 22, 1816 – December 28, 1884) was a lawyer, statesman, and soldier from Texas. He fought in the Texas Revolution, and as a colonel in the Confederate Army during the Civil War.

== Biography ==
Brewster was born in Laurens County, South Carolina. He read for the law and began his practice there. In 1836, while visiting New Orleans, he volunteered to serve in the nascent Texas Army. When Brewster arrived in Velasco, Texas, he was detached from his company to serve as secretary to General Sam Houston. The only action he was in was the Battle of San Jacinto. After that battle he accompanied Houston, who was wounded, to New Orleans.

When he returned to Texas later in 1836 he served briefly as the interim Secretary of War and Navy for President David G. Burnet. In the fall of that year, he established a legal practice at Brazoria. In 1840 he was appointed the District Attorney for the Second Judicial District of Texas, a post he held until 1843. Six years later, Governor of Texas George Tyler Wood appointed him Attorney General of the state of Texas. In 1855 Brewster moved to Washington, D.C. to practice international law.

When the Civil War erupted he returned to Texas, where he was commissioned a captain in the Confederate Army and was appointed adjutant general to General Albert Sidney Johnston on September 11, 1861. The next spring he became Johnston's chief of staff and was with the general when Johnston was killed at the Battle of Shiloh in April 1862. Afterwards he served on the staff of John Bell Hood, where he rose to the rank of colonel.

At the close of the war in 1865, he returned to Texas and practiced law in San Antonio. In 1881 Governor John Ireland appointed him commissioner of insurance, statistics, and history, a position he held until his death in Austin. His body was taken to Galveston and buried in the Gulf of Mexico.

== Honors ==
Brewster County, Texas, was named in his memory in 1887.

Legal offices
Preceded by John Woods Harris	Attorney General of Texas; 1850	Succeeded by Andrew Jackson Hamilton
