= Old Independence Cemetery =

- Interactive map of Old Independence Cemetery

Details
- Location: Independence, Texas
- Country: United States
- Coordinates: 30°19′43″N 96°21′40″W
- Find a Grave: Old Independence Cemetery

Old Independence Cemetery was founded in 1823. It is located in Independence, Texas, on land donated by Medora Coles McCrocklin, a daughter of Judge J. P. Coles, one of the Old Three Hundred from the Austin Colony. The cemetery was an early community graveyard used by Anglo-American pioneers of Texas. It is commemorated by a state historical marker.

Numerous prominent figures of the Republic of Texas are buried here, along with founders of Baylor University, which had its first campus in Independence.

Gravestones were cut from native limestone and some are decorated with seashells. There are a number of false crypts in the cemetery.

The nearby "Liberty Cemetery" was used by African-American members of this historic community.

== Notable burials ==
- Moses Austin Bryan (1843–1895)
- Tacitus Thomas Clay (1824–1868) – Built Clay Castle
- Ira Randolph Lewis (1800–1867) – Early settler
- Sam Houston, Jr. (1843–1894) – First son of Sam Houston

== See also ==
- National Register of Historic Places in Washington County, Texas
