= Tattle-Tape =

Security item for libraries

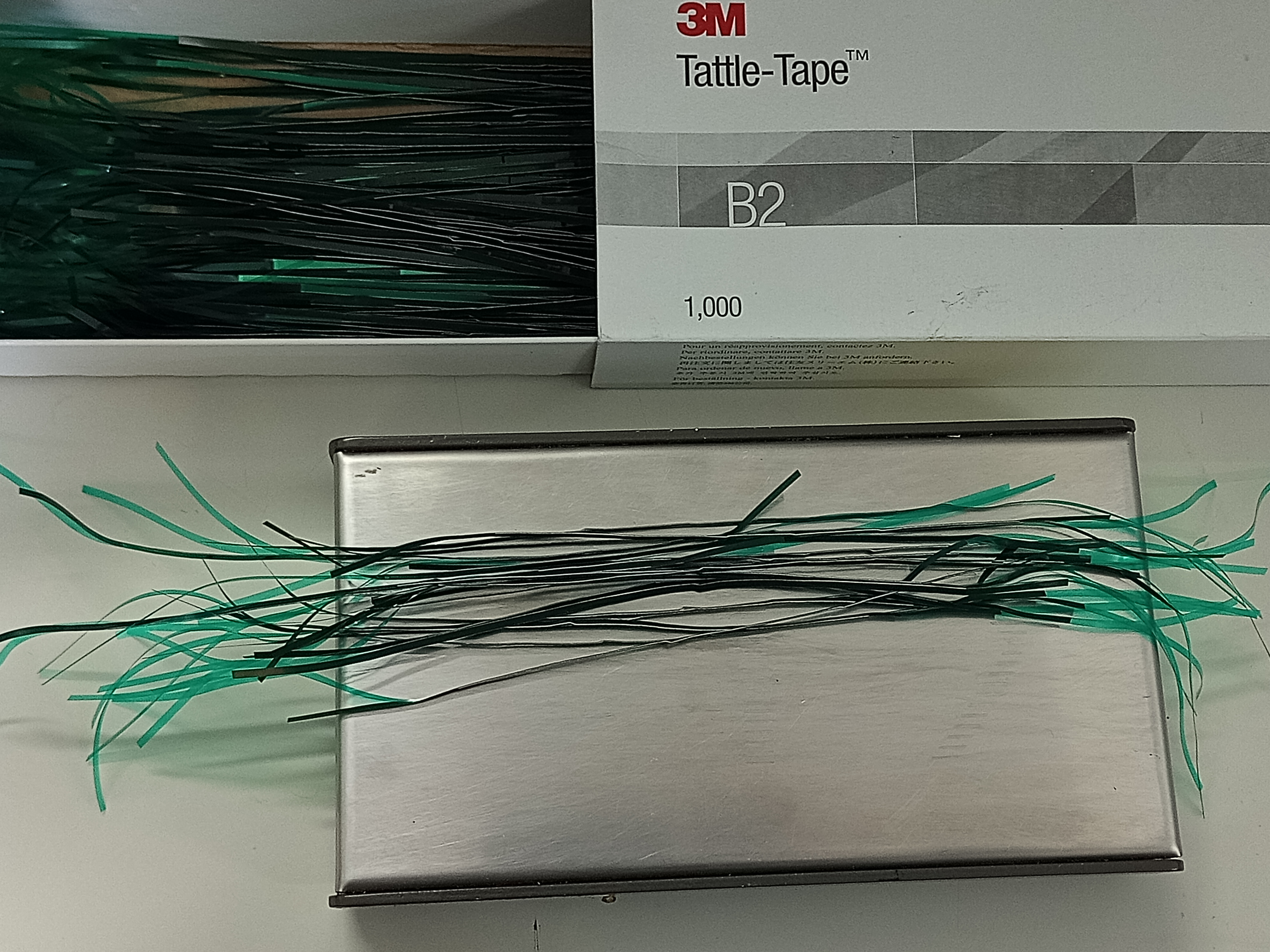
A box of Tattle-Tapes still on their protective plastic strips, with some resting on top of a magnet block used for 'desensitizing' them, allowing a book to be taken out of the library without alarms.

Tattle-Tape is a security system used in libraries to prevent theft of library materials. The tape consists of a magnetic metal strip embedded in a strip of thick, clear adhesive tape. This tape is usually affixed deep between the pages of a paperback book, or between the spine and binding for a hardcover book. When the magnetic strip in the tape is sensitized, an alarm will sound when the item passes through a special gate, typically near the exit. Thus, the items require desensitization by library staff before being given to the library patron to leave. When the book is returned, the tape is re-sensitized by library staff.

Tattle-Tape was designed by 3M and was first used at the Saint Paul Public Library in 1970. In 2015, Bibliotheca purchased 3M's Library Systems business and acquired the assets of its remaining global business.

== See also ==
- Electronic article surveillance
- Metglas
