= Shoplifting =

Theft of goods from a retail establishment

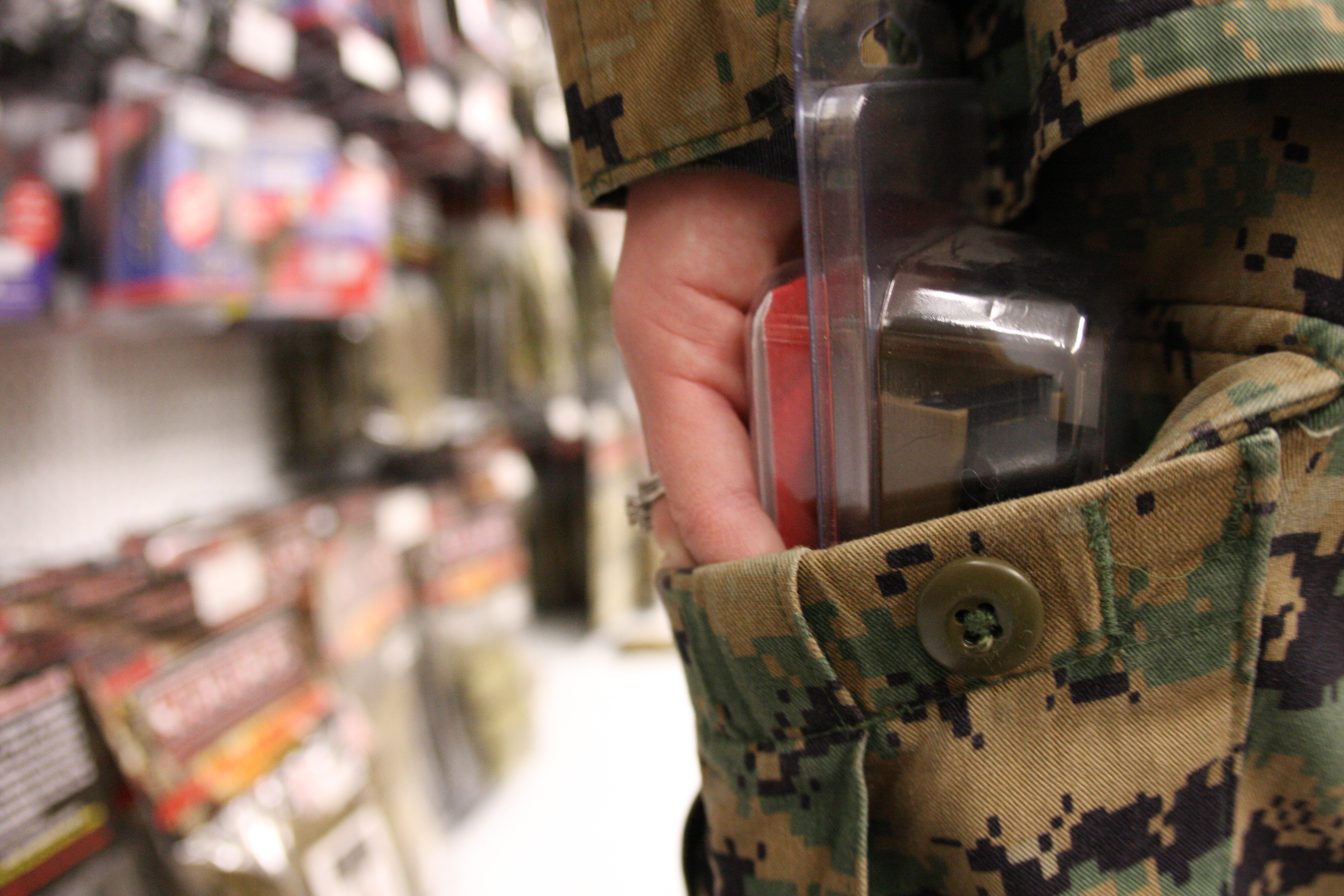
A person in a store slipping an item into his pocket

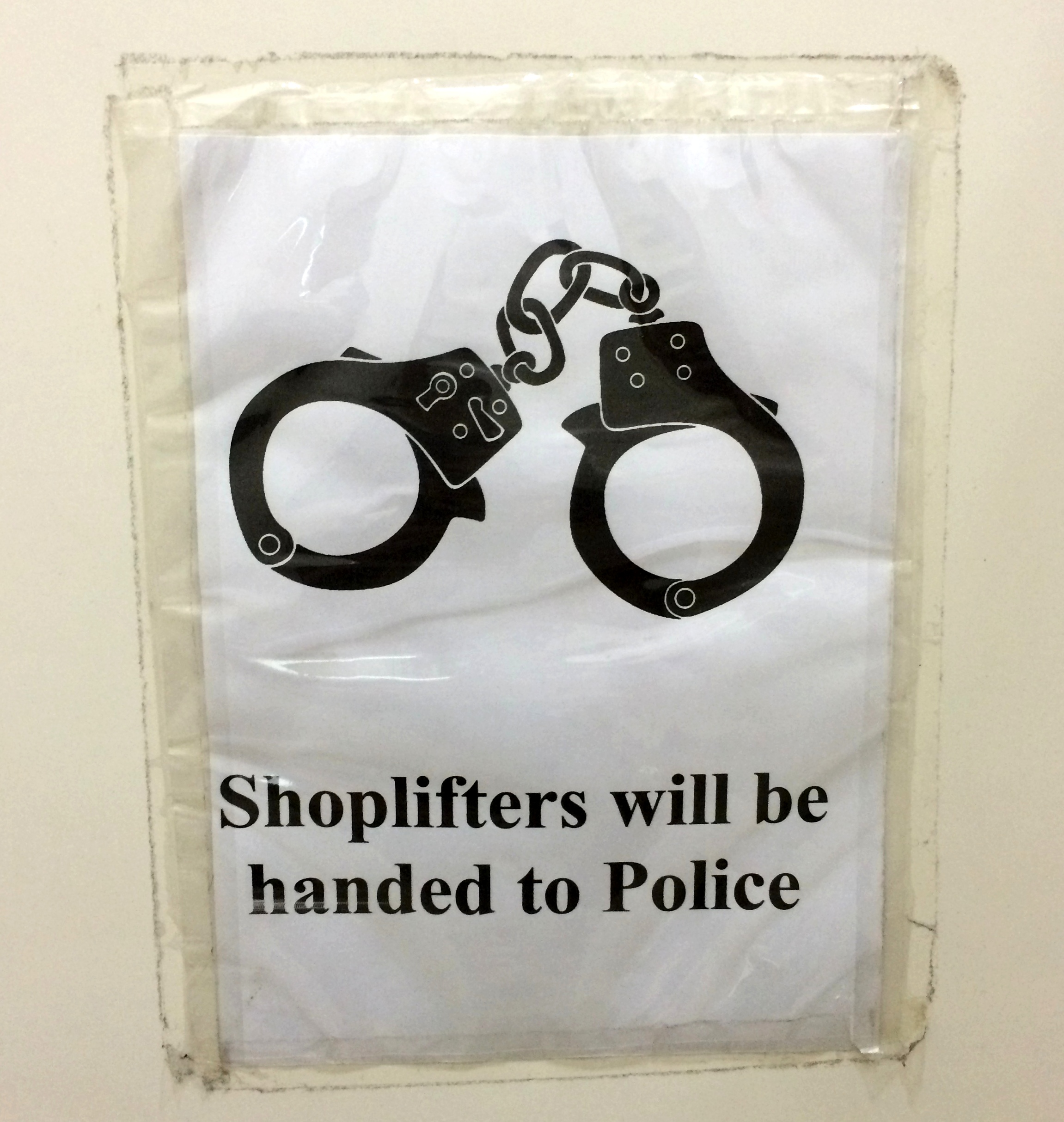
Notice warning shoplifters of potentially being arrested in Subang Parade, Malaysia

Shoplifting (also known as shop theft, shop fraud, retail theft, retail fraud or microlooting) is the theft of goods from a retail establishment during business hours. The terms shoplifting and shoplifter are not usually defined in law, and generally fall under larceny. In the retail industry, the word shrinkage (or shrink) is used to refer to merchandise often lost by shoplifting. The term five-finger discount is a euphemism for shoplifting, humorously referencing stolen items taken "at no cost" with the five fingers.

The first documented shoplifting started to take place in 16th century London. By the early 19th century, shoplifting was believed to be primarily a female activity. In the 1960s, shoplifting began to be redefined again, this time as a political act. Researchers divide shoplifters into two categories: boosters (professionals who resell what they steal), and snitches (amateurs who steal for their personal use). Shoplifters range from amateurs acting on impulse to career criminals who habitually engage in shoplifting as a form of income. Career criminals may use several individuals to shoplift, with some participants distracting store employees while another participant steals items. Amateurs typically steal products for personal use, while career criminals generally steal items to resell them on the black market. Other forms of shoplifting include swapping the price labels or barcodes of items so the item can be fraudulently purchased at a lower price, return fraud, or consuming food and drink at a grocery store without paying for it. Commonly shoplifted items are those with a high price in proportion to their size, such as disposable razor blades, electronic devices, vitamins, alcoholic beverages, and cigarettes.

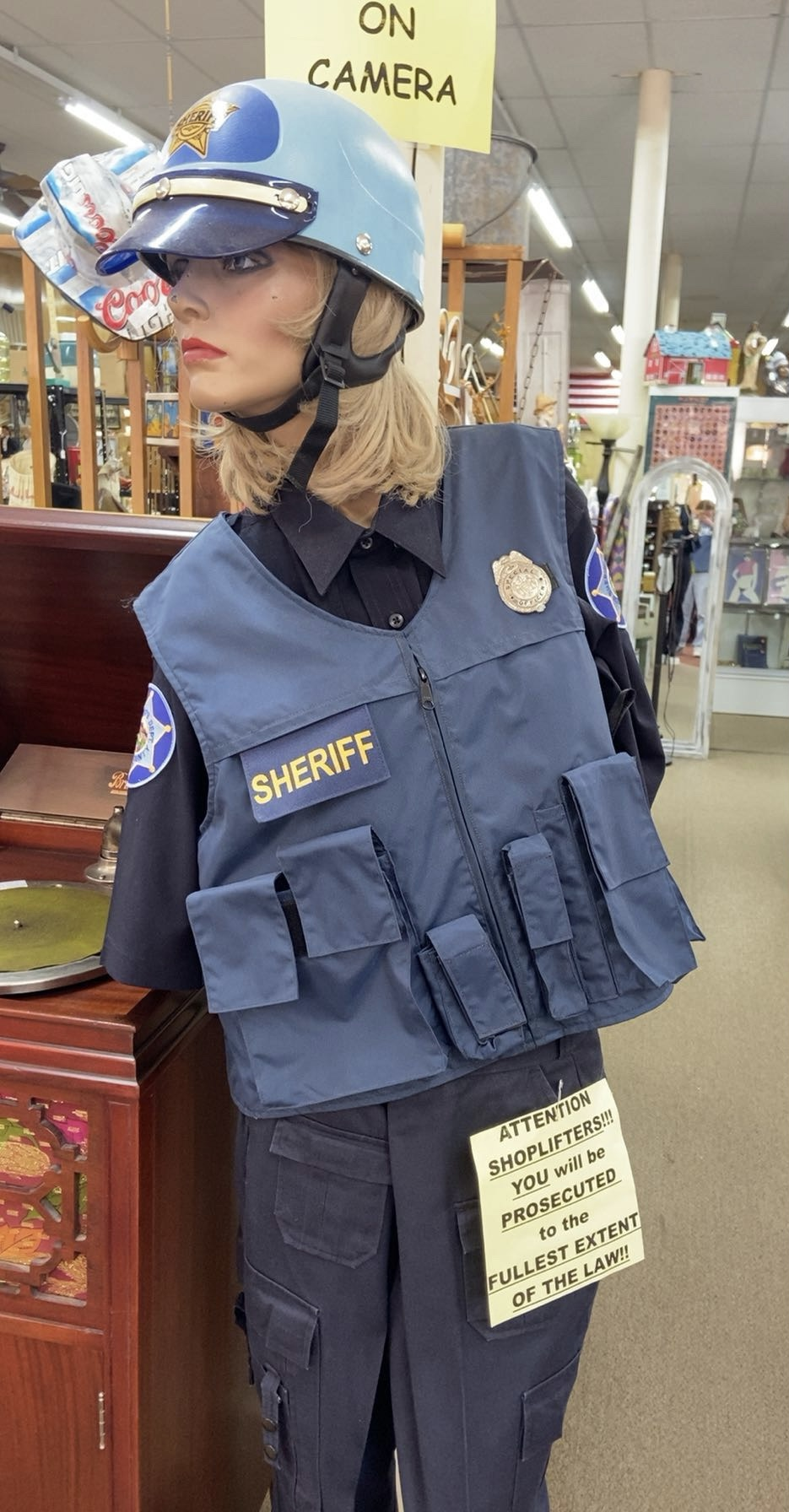
Campy anti-shoplifting mannequin in an antique store

Stores use a number of strategies to reduce shoplifting, including storing small, expensive items in locked glass cases; chaining or otherwise attaching items (particularly expensive ones) to shelves or clothes racks; attaching magnetic or radio sensors or dyepacks to items; installing curved mirrors mounted above shelves or video cameras and video monitors, hiring plainclothes store detectives and security guards, and banning the bringing in of backpacks or other bags. Large stores may offer storage of bags at a customer service desk in the front, with the customer handed a number tag or other identifier to be given back in exchange for their bag when they leave the store. Some stores have security guards at the exit, who search backpacks and bags and check receipts. Stores also combat shoplifting by training employees how to detect potential shoplifters.

== Definition ==
Shoplifting is the act of knowingly taking goods from an establishment in which they are displayed for sale, without paying for them. Shoplifting usually involves concealing items on the person or an accomplice, and leaving the store without paying. However, shoplifting can also include price switching (swapping the price labels or barcodes of different goods so the item can be fraudulently purchased at a lower price, often at self-checkout machines), refund fraud, and "grazing" (eating or sampling a store's goods while in the store). Retailers report that shoplifting has a significant effect on their bottom line - for instance, in 2022, Target reported $400 million in profit losses due to inventory shrink, and said organized retail theft was the primary cause for the loss.

Generally, criminal theft involves taking possession of property illegally. In self-service shops, customers are allowed by the property owner to take physical possession of the property by holding or moving it. This leaves areas of ambiguity that could criminalize some people for simple mistakes, such as accidentally putting a small item in a pocket or forgetting to pay. For this reason, penalties for shoplifting are often lower than those for general theft. Few jurisdictions have specific shoplifting legislation with which to differentiate it from other forms of theft, so reduced penalties are usually at a judge's discretion. Most retailers are aware of the serious consequences of making a false arrest, and will only attempt to apprehend a person if their guilt is beyond a reasonable doubt. Depending on local laws, arrests made by anyone other than law enforcement officers may also be illegal.

In England and Wales, theft is defined as "dishonestly appropriate[ing] property belonging to another with the intention of permanently depriving the other of it; and "thief" and "steal" shall be construed accordingly." It is one of the most common crimes. Shoplifting peaks between 3:00 and 4:00 p.m., and is lowest from 6:00 a.m. to 7:00 a.m. In the United States, shoplifting increases during the Christmas season, and arrest rates increase during spring break. Rutgers University criminologist Ronald V. Clarke says shoplifters steal "hot products" that are "CRAVED", an acronym he created that stands for "concealable, removable, available, valuable, enjoyable, and disposable".

== History ==
Shoplifting, originally called "lifting", is as old as shopping. The first documented shoplifting started to take place in 16th-century London, and was carried out by groups of men called lifters. In 1591, playwright Robert Greene published a pamphlet titled The Second Part of Cony Catching, in which he described how three men could conspire to shoplift clothes and fabric from London merchants. When it was first documented, shoplifting was characterized as an underworld practice: shoplifters were also con artists, pickpockets, pimps, or prostitutes.

In the late 17th century, London shopkeepers began to display goods in ways designed to attract shoppers, such as in window displays and glass cases. This made the goods more accessible for shoppers to handle and examine, which historians say led to an acceleration of shoplifting.

The word shoplift (then, shop-lift) first appeared at the end of the 17th century in books like The Ladies Dictionary, which, as well as describing shoplifting, provided tips on losing weight and styling hair. Female shoplifters of this period were also called "Amazons" or "roaring girl". Notorious female shoplifters in London included Mary Frith, the pickpocket and fence also known as Moll Cutpurse, pickpocket Moll King, Sarah McCabe whose shoplifting career spanned twenty years, and Maria Carlston (also known as Mary Blacke), whose life was documented by diarist Samuel Pepys, who was eventually executed for theft, and who for years shoplifted clothing and household linens in London with one or more female accomplices.

In 1699, the English Parliament passed The Shoplifting Act, part of the Bloody Code that punished petty crimes with death. People convicted of shoplifting items worth more than five shillings would be hanged in London's Tyburn Tree (known as the "Tyburn jig") with crowds of thousands watching, or would be transported to the North American colonies or to Botany Bay in Australia. Some merchants found The Shoplifting Act overly severe, jurors often deliberately under-valued the cost of items stolen so convicted shoplifters would escape death, and reformist lawyers advocated for the Act's repeal, but The Shoplifting Act was supported by powerful people such as Lord Ellenborough, who characterized penal transportation as "a summer airing to a milder climate" and the archbishop of Canterbury, who believed that strong punishment was necessary to prevent a dramatic increase in crime. As England began to embrace Enlightenment ideas about crime and punishment in the 18th century, opposition to the Bloody Code began to grow. The last English execution for shoplifting was carried out in 1822, and in 1832 the House of Lords reclassified shoplifting as a non-capital crime.

By the early 19th century, shoplifting was believed to be primarily a female activity, and doctors began to redefine some shoplifting as what Swiss doctor André Matthey had then newly christened "klopemania" (kleptomania), from the Greek words "kleptein" (stealing) and "mania" (insanity). Kleptomania was primarily attributed to wealthy and middle-class women, and in 1896 was criticized by anarchist Emma Goldman as a way for the rich to excuse their own class from punishment, while continuing to punish the poor for the same acts.

In the 1960s, shoplifting began to be redefined again, this time as a political act. In his 1970 book Do It: Scenarios of the Revolution, American activist Jerry Rubin wrote "All money represents theft...shoplifting gets you high. Don't buy. Steal," and in The Anarchist Cookbook, published in 1971, American author William Powell offered tips for how to shoplift. In his 1971 book Steal This Book, American activist Abbie Hoffman offered tips on how to shoplift and argued that shoplifting is anti-corporate. In her book The Steal: A Cultural History of Shoplifting, social historian Rachel Shteir described how shoplifting from companies disliked by individuals is considered by some activist groups, such as some freegans, decentralized anarchist collective CrimethInc, the Spanish anarchist collective Yomango and the Canadian magazine Adbusters, to be a morally defensible act of corporate sabotage.

== Common targets ==
Commonly shoplifted items are usually small and easy to hide, such as groceries, especially steak and instant coffee, razor blades and cartridges, small technology items such as vapes, smartphones, USB flash drives, earphones, gift cards, cosmetics, jewelry, multivitamins, pregnancy tests, electric toothbrushes, and clothing. The most commonly shoplifted item used to be cigarettes until stores started keeping them behind the cash register.

== Methods ==
=== Concealing ===
Shoplifters may conceal items in their pockets, under their clothes, in bags, or in a personal item they are carrying (for example, a box) or pushing (for example, a stroller) or, if at a shopping center/mall, a bag from another store in that center. The use of backpacks and other bags to shoplift has led some stores to not allow people with backpacks in the store, often by asking the person to leave their backpack at a store counter. With clothes, shoplifters may put on the store clothing underneath their own clothes and leave the store.

=== Walkout/pushout ===
Some shoppers fill a shopping cart with unconcealed merchandise, and walk out of the store without paying. Loss prevention workers often refer to this method as a "walkout" or "pushout". With clothing, some shoplifters may simply put on a coat or jacket from the store and walk out wearing the item. This tactic is used because busy employees may simply not notice a person pushing a cart out without paying or walking out wearing a store-owned coat. Some "pushout" shoplifters purposefully exit quickly to avoid detection, as this gives employees less time to react.

Many stores instruct employees other than those directly involved in theft prevention or security to confront someone only verbally to avoid any possibility of being held liable for injury or unwarranted detention. While that may allow stolen goods to not be recovered, the loss of revenue may be judged to be acceptable in light of the cost of a potential lawsuit or an employee being injured by a fleeing shoplifter.

== Offenders ==
Offenders can be broken into two general categories: individuals who shoplift for personal gain, and professionals who shoplift for purposes of resale.

=== Individuals ===
Some shoplifters are amateurs who do not steal regularly from stores and who do not use shoplifting as a form of income (e.g., by reselling stolen goods). Researchers call these amateurs "snitches," as they are stealing items for their personal use. In several countries, criminal flash mobs, primarily made up of teenagers and young adults, enter stores with the intention of stealing merchandise while accomplices distract staff.

=== Professionals and criminal organizations ===
Some people and groups make their living from shoplifting. They tend to be more skilled career criminals who use more sophisticated shoplifting tactics. Some researchers call professional thieves "boosters," as they tend to resell what they steal on the black market.

Regional gangs and international crime organizations may create and coordinate shoplifting rings. These rings may involve multiple shoplifters, diversions, and the complicity of employees in a targeted business. Some shoplifting rings focus on stealing items included on lists provided by the criminal leaders. Some organized theft groups engage in labor trafficking, smuggling undocumented individuals into a country and then requiring them to steal in order to pay off fees and debts associated with their being smuggled across the border.

== Motivation ==
Motivations for shoplifting are controversial among researchers, although they generally agree that shoplifters are driven by either economic or psychosocial motives. Psychosocial motivations may include peer pressure, a desire for thrill or excitement, impulse, stealing because judgment is clouded by intoxication, or doing so because of a compulsion. Depression is the psychiatric disorder most commonly associated with shoplifting. Shoplifting is also associated with family or marital stress, social isolation, having had a difficult childhood, alcoholism or drug use, low self-esteem, eating disorders, and pathological gambling.

Researchers have found that the decision to shoplift is associated with pro-shoplifting attitudes, social factors, opportunities for shoplifting and the perception that the shoplifter is unlikely to be caught. Researchers say that shoplifters justify their shoplifting through a variety of personal narratives, such as believing they are making up for having been victimized, that they are unfairly being denied things they deserve, or that the retailers they steal from are untrustworthy or immoral. Sociologists call these narratives neutralizations, meaning mechanisms people use to silence values within themselves that would otherwise prevent them from carrying out a particular act.

Developmental psychologists believe that children under the age of nine shoplift to test boundaries, and that tweens and teenagers shoplift mainly for excitement or the thrill, are "acting out" (or depressed), or are being pressured by their peers.

== Economics ==
Economists say shoplifting is common because it is a relatively unskilled crime with low entry barriers that can be fitted into a normal lifestyle. People of every nation, race, ethnicity, gender and social class shoplift. Originally, analysis of data about apprehended shoplifters and interviews with store detectives suggested that females were almost twice as likely as males to shoplift. However, since 1980, the data suggest that males are equally or more likely to shoplift than females. The average shoplifter first did it at the age of ten: shoplifting tends to peak in adolescence then steadily declines thereafter. People of all races shoplift equally, and poor people shoplift only slightly more than rich people. Men tend to shoplift using bags, and women using strollers. When caught, a shoplifter has on average $200 worth of unpaid merchandise.

=== Economic impact ===
According to a report from Tyco Retail Solutions, the global retail industry lost an estimated $34 billion in sales in 2017 to shoplifting, which is approximately 2 percent of total revenue. Shoplifting is the largest single reason for loss of merchandise.

Retailers report that shoplifting has a significant effect on their bottom line, stating that about 0.6% of all inventory disappears to shoplifters. According to the 2012 National Retail Security Survey, shoplifting costs American retailers approximately $14B annually. In 2001, it was claimed that shoplifting cost US retailers $25 million a day. Observers believe that industry shoplifting numbers are over half employee theft or fraud and the rest by patrons. Of course, if apprehended during the shoplifting the merchandise is generally recovered by the retailers and there is often no loss to the store owner when the merchandise is surrendered to the store by the suspects. In addition, in many states retailers have the right to recover civil damages to cover the cost of providing security.

According to a December 23, 2008, article in the Pittsburgh Post-Gazette, Dimperio's Market, the only full-service grocery store in the Hazelwood neighborhood of Pittsburgh, Pennsylvania, closed because of shoplifters. Walgreens reported that it closed 10 stores in the San Francisco area between 2019 and 2020, primarily due to a surge in theft.

In mid-October of 2021, Walgreens announced the closure of five stores in San Francisco due to an increase in retail theft in San Francisco.

== Differences by geography ==
Researchers say that around the world, in countries including the United States, Canada, Australia, Brazil, Mexico, South Africa, Japan, and India, people tend to shoplift the same types of items, and frequently even the same brands.

But there are also differences in shoplifting among different countries that reflect those countries' general consumption habits and preferences. In Milan, saffron, an expensive component of risotto alla Milanese, is frequently shoplifted, and throughout Italy, parmigiano reggiano is often stolen from supermarkets. In Spain, jamón ibérico is a frequent target. In France, the anise-flavoured liqueur ricard is frequently stolen, and in Japan, experts believe that manga comics, electronic games and whisky are most frequently stolen. Bookstores and magazine sellers in Japan have also complained about what they call "digital shoplifting", which refers to the photographing of material in-store for later reading. Packaged cheese has been the most frequently shoplifted item in Norway, with thieves selling it afterwards to pizza parlours and fast food restaurants.

== Consequences ==
Shoplifting is a form of theft. Retailers may ban from their premises those who have shoplifted from stores.

=== United States ===
In most cases in the United States, store employees and managers have certain powers of arrest. Store officials may detain for investigation (for a reasonable length of time) the person whom they have probable cause to believe is attempting to take or has unlawfully taken merchandise (see shopkeeper's privilege). Store employees may also have citizen's arrest powers, but absent a statute granting broader authority, a citizen's arrest power is normally available only for felony offenses, while shoplifting is usually a misdemeanor offense.

In the United States, store employees who detain suspects outside of and inside the store premises are generally granted limited powers of arrest by state law, and have the power to initiate criminal arrests or civil sanctions, or both, depending upon the policy of the retailer and the state statutes governing civil demands and civil recovery for shoplifting as reconciled with the criminal laws of the jurisdiction.

In the United States, shoplifting is a felony or a misdemeanor depending on how much the stolen items are worth, and each state sets its own dollar limit. Since 2000, at least 37 states have raised that limit, partly because prices have gone up over time. A 2017 study by the Pew Charitable Trusts looked at 30 states that raised the limit between 2000 and 2012; it found no change in theft or other property crime rates, and crime fell by about the same amount in states that did not. In California, Proposition 47 (2014) changed some thefts and drug crimes of $950 or less from felonies to misdemeanors, and it made shoplifting its own misdemeanor. A 2024 study by the Public Policy Institute of California found that some property crime went up after Prop 47 and the COVID-19 pandemic, including burglary (2.9%), car theft (1.7%), and larceny, a type of theft (1.1%). In November 2024, California voters passed Proposition 36, which makes theft of $950 or less a felony for people with two or more earlier convictions for certain thefts, such as shoplifting. Retail industry groups supported rolling back Prop 47, saying the higher limit encouraged repeat thieves, while opponents of Prop 36 said it was like a return to the war on drugs. Data from the Council on Criminal Justice show that reported shoplifting in its study cities was 4% lower in the first half of 2025 than in the first half of 2019, though the council warns that police reports can undercount shoplifting.

=== England and Wales ===
In England and Wales, an offence involving shoplifting may be charged under Section 1 of the Theft Act 1986; alternatively, if the goods stolen are worth less than £200, a person may be charged under Section 176 of the Anti-Social Behaviour, Crime and Policing Act. Upon conviction, the maximum penalty is a fine or up to six months in prison if the goods stolen are worth less than £200; if they are worth more than £200, the maximum penalty is seven years in prison.

=== Middle East ===
In the Islamic legal system called Sharia, hudud ("limits" or "restrictions") calls for sariqa ("theft") to be punished by amputation of the thief's right hand. This punishment is categorized as hadd, meaning a punishment that restrains or prevents further crime. Sariqa is interpreted differently in different countries and by different scholars, and some say it does not include shoplifting. In Saudi Arabia, shoplifters' hands may be amputated, though.

== Prevention ==
Shoplifting may be prevented and detected. Closed-circuit television (CCTV) monitoring is an important anti-shoplifting technology. Electronic article surveillance (EAS) is another method of inventory protection. Radio-frequency identification (RFID) is an anti-employee-theft and anti-shoplifting technology used in retailers such as Walmart, which already heavily use RFID technology for inventory purposes. Loss prevention personnel can consist of both uniformed officers and plain-clothed store detectives. Large department stores will use both and smaller stores will use one or the other depending on their shrink strategy. Store detectives will patrol the store acting as if they are real shoppers. Physical measures include implementing a one-way entry and exit system, protected with devices such as "shark teeth" gates to ensure trolleys can only pass through one way.

=== Closed-circuit television ===
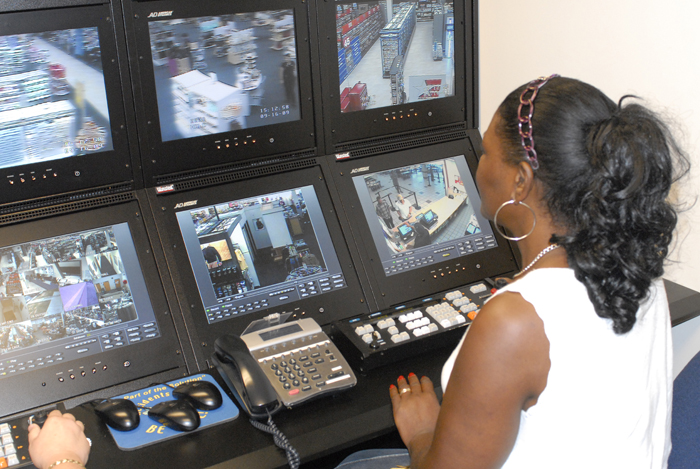
A retail loss prevention employee watches a store's CCTV cameras.

Closed-circuit television (CCTV) monitoring is an important anti-shoplifting technology. Retailers focusing on loss prevention often devote most of their resources to this technology. Using CCTVs to apprehend shoplifters in the act requires full-time human monitoring of the cameras. Sophisticated CCTV systems discriminate the scenes to detect and segregate suspicious behaviour from numerous screens and to enable automatic alerting. However, the attentiveness of the surveillance personnel may be threatened by false reliance on automation. CCTV is more effective if used in conjunction with electronic article surveillance (EAS) systems. The EAS system will warn of a potential shoplifter and the video may provide evidence for prosecution if the shoplifter is allowed to pass checkout points or leave store premises with unbought merchandise.

Many stores will use public-view monitors in the store to show people there that they are being recorded. That is intended as a deterrent to shoplifting. Some stores use inexpensive dummy cameras. Even though these fake cameras cannot record images, their presence may deter shoplifting.

=== Electronic article surveillance ===
Electronic article surveillance (EAS) are magnetic or radio-frequency tags that sound an alarm if a shoplifter leaves a store with store items that have not been paid for. EAS methods are second only to CCTV in popularity amongst retailers looking for inventory protection. EAS refers to the electronic security tags that are attached to merchandise and cause an alarm to sound on exiting the store. Some stores also have detection systems at the entrance to the restrooms that sound an alarm if someone tries to take unpaid merchandise with them into the restrooms. Regularly, even when an alarm does sound, a shoplifter walks out casually and is not confronted if no guards are present because of the high number of false alarms, especially in malls, due to "tag pollution" whereby non-deactivated tags from other stores set off the alarm. This can be overcome with newer systems and a properly trained staff. Some new systems either do not alarm from "tag pollution" or they produce a specific alarm when a customer enters the store with a non-deactivated tag so that store personnel can remove or deactivate it so it does not produce a false alarm when exiting the store. However, spider wrap may be used instead of tags.

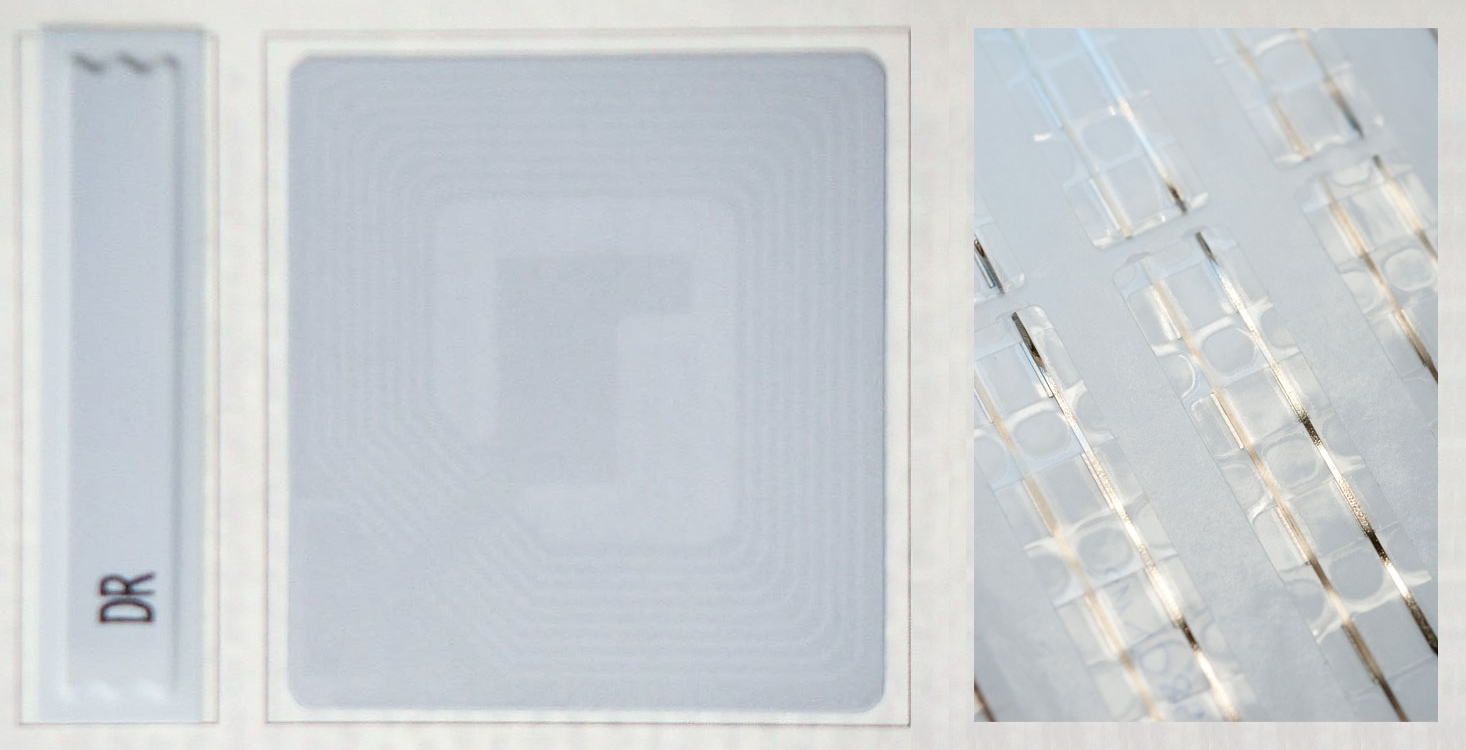
Electronic article surveillance tags. From left to right: acousto-magnetic (tall white rectangle), RF (white square), electromagnetic (long metallic strips).

Some tags are stuck onto merchandise with glue (rather than being superimposed on); the shoplifter can easily scrape off the tag in their pocket. Pedestal EAS covers, which are made of durable vinyl, offer a cost-effective means of adding a marketing tool at every entrance to a store; they are also custom-manufactured to fit any pedestal and can be printed to highlight specific brands or seasonal promotions. They do not interfere with the performance of the EAS systems and are easily cleaned or changed. Some shoplifters may employ jammer devices to prevent EAS tags from triggering, or magnets to remove the tags. Stores may employ technology to detect jammers and magnets.

Radio-frequency identification (RFID) is an anti-employee-theft and anti-shoplifting technology used in retailers such as Walmart, which already heavily use RFID technology for inventory purposes. If a product with an active RFID tag passes the exit scanners at a Walmart outlet, not only does it set off an alarm, but it also tells security personnel exactly what product to look for in the shopper's cart.

=== Exit inspections ===
In the United States, shoppers are under no actual obligation to accede to such a search unless the employee has reasonable grounds to suspect shoplifting and arrests the customer or takes or looks at the receipt from the customer without violating any laws or if the customer has signed a membership agreement which stipulates that customers will subject themselves to inspections before taking the purchased merchandise from the store. In the cases of Sam's Club and Costco, the contracts merely say that it is their policy to check receipts at the exit or that they "reserve the right." That wording does not specify the results of non-compliance by the customer, and since they did not have a right to re-check receipts in the first place, it may not be legally binding at all. The purchaser who holds the receipt owns the merchandise. Employees who harass, assault, touch, or detain customers or take their purchased merchandise may be committing torts or crimes against the customers.

=== Display cases ===
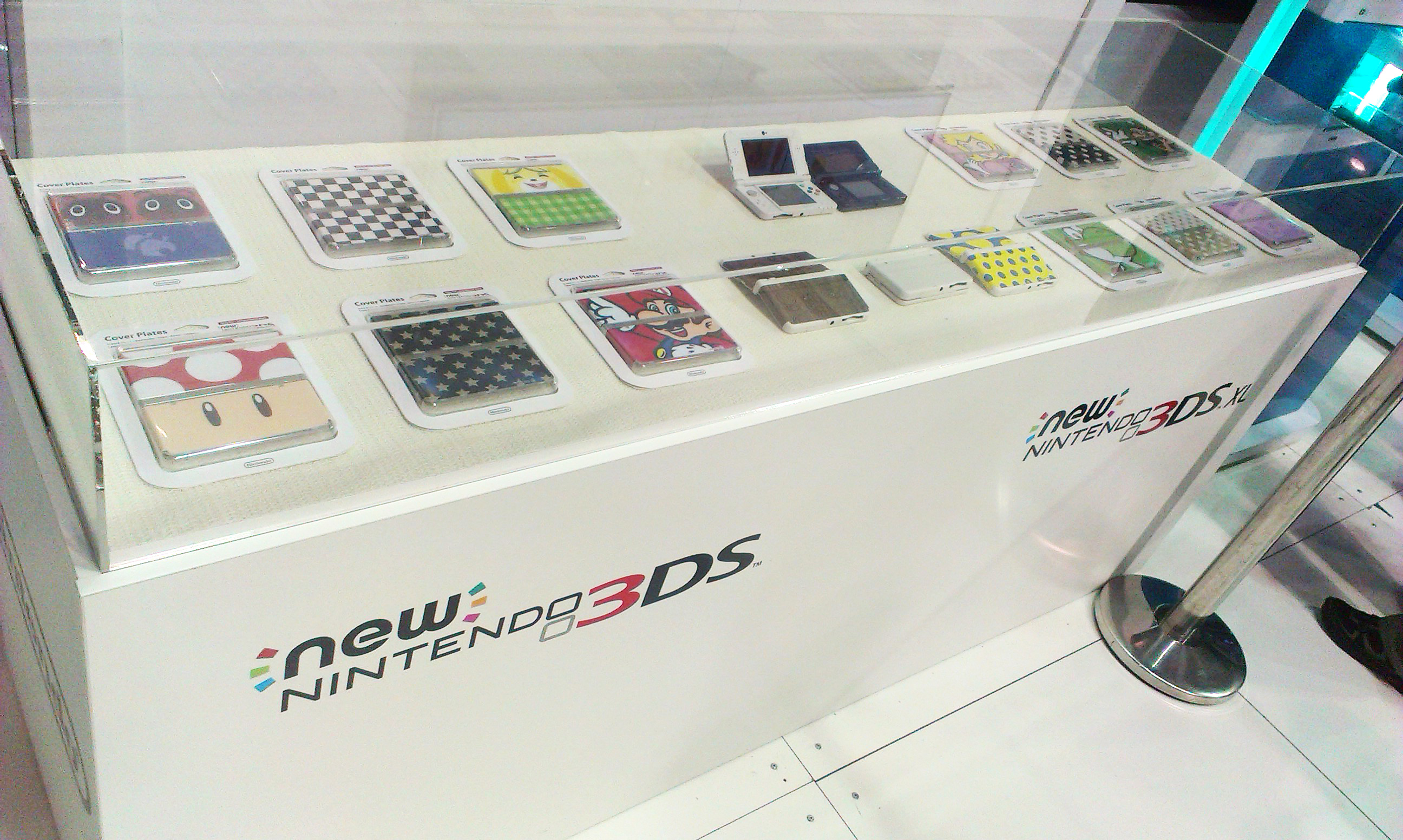
New Nintendo 3DS decorative cases and consoles in a locked display case.

Some expensive merchandise will be in a locked case requiring an employee to get items at a customer's request. The customer is either required to purchase the merchandise immediately or it is left at the checkout register (under the supervision of a cashier) for the customer to purchase when finished shopping. This prevents the customer from having a chance to conceal the item.

== See also ==
- Civil recovery
- Dine and dash
- Evasion, an autobiography detailing one man's shoplifting and dumpster diving-supported travels
- Exit control lock
- Fence (criminal)
- John Papworth
- Kleptomania
- Larceny
- Library theft
- Organized retail crime
- Package pilferage
- Receipt of stolen property
- Retail loss prevention
- StopLift, a checkout vision system
- Sweethearting
- Yomango
