= Sweethearting =

Internal theft technique

In the retail industry, sweethearting is a form of theft by employees at the cash register, where they give away merchandise to a "sweetheart" customer (such as a friend, family member or fellow employee). Cashiers are able to do this in numerous ways, including:

- Scan avoidance
- Price overrides
- Refund fraud, gift card fraud
- Void fraud
- Invoicing scams

Sweethearting is the most common type of employee theft.

== Countermeasures ==
Most methods of stopping sweethearting include physical supervision of the cashier or installation of software that detects sweethearting, which can be difficult to do. Common countermeasures include use of CCTV surveillance cameras and security guards checking customer receipts at exits. A modern, well-implemented and tightly managed retail management system enables store management to track which cashiers may ring up unusually high amounts of merchandise known to be attractive to thieves.
