= Oliver C. Hartley =

American politician

Oliver Hartley

Member of the Texas House of Representatives from the 34th district
- In office November 3, 1851 – November 7, 1853

Personal details
- Born: Oliver Cromwell Hartley; March 31, 1823 Bedford County, Pennsylvania, U.S.
- Died: January 13, 1859 (aged 35) Galveston, Texas, U.S.
- Education: Franklin & Marshall College (BA)

Oliver Cromwell Hartley (March 31, 1823 – January 13, 1859) was an American lawyer and politician from Galveston, Texas, who served as a member of the Texas House of Representatives.

== Early life and education ==
Hartley was born in Bedford County, Pennsylvania, in 1823. He earned a Bachelor of Arts degree from Franklin & Marshall College and was admitted to the Pennsylvania Bar Association in 1841.

== Career ==
Hartley served as the reporter for the Supreme Court of Texas from 1846 to 1859 and published the first codification of state laws in A Digest of the Laws of Texas in 1850. In 1854, Governor Elisha M. Pease appointed him to a commission that codified state laws.

Hartley also served in the Texas House of Representatives for one term, from November 3, 1851, to November 7, 1853.

== Personal life ==
Hartley died in Galveston on February 13, 1859. Hartley County, Texas, is named for him and his brother, Rufus K. Hartley.
